= 2018–19 Stade Rennais FC season =

Rennes
2018–19 season
- Chairman: Olivier Létang
- Head coach: Sabri Lamouchi (until 3 December); Julien Stephan (from 3 December)
- Stadium: Roazhon Park
- Ligue 1: 10th
- Coupe de France: Winners
- Coupe de la Ligue: Quarter-finals
- UEFA Europa League: Round of 16
- Top goalscorer: League: M'Baye Niang (11); All: M'Baye Niang (14)
- Highest home attendance: 29,205 vs Paris Saint-Germain (23 September 2018)
- Lowest home attendance: 19,300 vs Angers (18 August 2018)
Home colours	Away colours	Third colours

The 2018–19 Stade Rennais season was the 117th professional season of the club since its creation in 1901. During this campaign, the club competed in Ligue 1, the Coupe de France, the Coupe de la Ligue and the UEFA Europa League, the latter being Rennes' first participation in European competition since making the qualifying rounds of the 2008–09 UEFA Cup.

Rennes won a third Coupe de France title, and a first since 1971, after defeating Paris Saint-Germain in the final.

== Players ==
=== First-team squad ===
Note: Flags indicate national team as defined under FIFA eligibility rules; some limited exceptions apply. Players may hold more than one non-FIFA nationality.

No.	Pos.	Nation	Player
2	DF	ALG	Mehdi Zeffane
3	DF	FRA	Damien Da Silva
4	DF	MOZ	Mexer
6	MF	SWE	Jakob Johansson
7	FW	SEN	Ismaïla Sarr
8	MF	FRA	Clément Grenier
9	FW	FRA	Jordan Siebatcheu
10	MF	FRA	Rafik Guitane
11	FW	SEN	M'Baye Niang (on loan from Torino)
12	MF	FRA	James Lea Siliki
14	MF	FRA	Benjamin Bourigeaud
15	DF	ALG	Ramy Bensebaini
16	GK	SEN	Abdoulaye Diallo
18	FW	FRA	Hatem Ben Arfa (vice-captain)

No.	Pos.	Nation	Player
20	DF	FRA	Gerzino Nyamsi
21	MF	FRA	Benjamin André (captain)
22	MF	FRA	Romain Del Castillo
23	MF	FRA	Adrien Hunou
24	DF	GUF	Ludovic Baal
26	DF	FRA	Jérémy Gelin
27	DF	MLI	Hamari Traoré
28	MF	FRA	Denis-Will Poha
29	DF	FRA	Romain Danzé
30	GK	LTU	Edvinas Gertmonas
35	MF	FRA	Nicolas Janvier
36	DF	FRA	Namakoro Diallo
40	GK	CZE	Tomáš Koubek

=== Out on loan ===
Note: Flags indicate national team as defined under FIFA eligibility rules; some limited exceptions apply. Players may hold more than one non-FIFA nationality.

No.	Pos.	Nation	Player
17	MF	FRA	Faitout Maouassa (on loan to Nîmes)
—	MF	FRA	Stéphane Diarra (on loan to Le Mans)
—	FW	SEN	Diafra Sakho (on loan to Bursaspor)

No.	Pos.	Nation	Player
—	FW	FRA	Armand Laurienté (on loan to Orléans)
—	FW	FRA	Jordan Tell (on loan to Orléans)
—	FW	ESP	Brandon Thomas (on loan to Osasuna)

== Competitions ==
=== Ligue 1 ===
==== League table ====
Pos	Team	Pld	W	D	L	GF	GA	GD	Pts	Qualification or relegation
8	Reims	38	13	16	9	39	42	−3	55	
9	Nîmes	38	15	8	15	57	58	−1	53	
10	Rennes	38	13	13	12	55	52	+3	52	Qualification to Europa League group stage (Note: Rennes qualified for the Europa League group stage by winning the 2018–19 Coupe de France.)
11	Strasbourg	38	11	16	11	58	48	+10	49	Qualification to Europa League second qualifying round (Note: Strasbourg qualified for the Europa League second qualifying round by winning the 2018–19 Coupe de la Ligue.)
12	Nantes	38	13	9	16	48	48	0	48	

Source: Ligue 1 and Soccerway
Rules for classification: 1) Points; 2) Goal difference; 3) Head-to-head points; 4) Head-to-head goal difference; 5) Head-to-head goals scored; 6) Head-to-head away goals scored; 7) Goals scored; 8) Away goals scored; 9) Most goals scored in single league match; 10) Fairplay ranking.

==== Results summary ====
Overall								Home						Away					
Pld	W	D	L	GF	GA	GD	Pts	W	D	L	GF	GA	GD	W	D	L	GF	GA	GD
38	13	13	12	55	52	+3	52	8	7	4	27	18	+9	5	6	8	28	34	−6

Source: Competitive matches

==== Results by round ====
Round	1	2	3	4	5	6	7	8	9	10	11	12	13	14	15	16	17	18	19	20	21	22	23	24	25	26	27	28	29	30	31	32	33	34	35	36	37	38
Ground	A	H	A	H	A	H	A	H	A	A	H	A	H	A	H	A	H	A	H	A	H	A	H	H	A	H	A	H	A	H	A	H	A	H	A	H	A	H
Result	L	W	D	W	L	L	L	D	W	D	L	W	D	D	L	W	W	L	W	W	D	L	W	W	L	D	L	W	D	L	D	D	L	D	D	D	W	W
Position	15	12	13	6	9	13	17	16	11	11	14	12	12	13	14	13	10	8	8	8	9	10	9	7	11	9	10	8	8	10	11	11	11	11	13	12	10	10

Source: Results
A = Away; H = Home; W = Win; D = Draw; L = Loss

==== Matches ====
11 August 2018 1	Lille	3–1	Rennes	Villeneuve-d'Ascq
20:00 CEST (UTC+02:00)	Mothiba 45'; Pépé 54'; Bamba 68'; Dabila (yellow card) 88'	Report	Grenier 43'	Stadium: Stade Pierre-Mauroy; Attendance: 25,708; Referee: Willy Delajod

18 August 2018 2	Rennes	1–0	Angers	Rennes
20:00 CEST (UTC+2)	Gelin (yellow card) 58'; Sarr 81'	Report	Kanga (yellow card) 43'; Fulgini (yellow card) 90+3'	Stadium: Roazhon Park; Attendance: 19,300; Referee: Olivier Thual

26 August 2018 3	Marseille	2–2	Rennes	Marseille
21:00 CEST (UTC+02:00)	Kamara (yellow card) 20'; Ocampos 54'; Bensebaini 72' (o.g.)	Report	Bourigeaud 38' (pen.); Sarr 45+1'; André (yellow card) 90'	Stadium: Stade Vélodrome; Attendance: 55,525; Referee: Antony Gautier

2 September 2018 4	Rennes	2–0	Bordeaux	Rennes
17:00 CEST (UTC+02:00)	André 12'; Bensebaini 16'	Report	Poundjé (yellow card) 49'; Lerager (yellow card) 55'; Sankharé (yellow card) 60'	Stadium: Roazhon Park; Attendance: 23,817; Referee: Benoît Bastien

14 September 2018 5	Nice	2–1	Rennes	Nice
19:00	Hérelle (yellow card) 40'; Dante (yellow card) 60'; Attal (yellow card) 74'; Saint-Maximin 77'; Tameze (yellow card) 79'; Lees-Melou 89'	Report	Léa Siliki (yellow card) 45+1'; M. Sarr 58' (o.g.)	Stadium: Allianz Riviera; Attendance: 16,887; Referee: Jérôme Miguelgorry

23 September 2018 6	Rennes	1–3	Paris Saint-Germain	Rennes
15:00 CEST (UTC+2)	Rabiot 11' (o.g.); Bensebaini (yellow card) 19'; Traoré (yellow card) 90+1'	Report	Draxler (yellow card) 19'; Di María 45'; Meunier 61'; Bernat (yellow card) 63'; Rabiot (yellow card) 76'; Choupo-Moting 83'	Stadium: Roazhon Park; Attendance: 29,205; Referee: Hakim Ben El Hadj

26 September 2018 7	Amiens	2–1	Rennes	Amiens
19:00	Gnahoré 51'; Gouano 66'	Report	Gelin (yellow card) 17', (red card) 61'; Bensebaini (yellow card) 39'; Grenier 81'	Stadium: Stade de la Licorne; Attendance: 7,605; Referee: Johan Hamel

30 September 2018 8	Rennes	1–1	Toulouse	Rennes
15:00	André (yellow card) 59'; Niang 70' (pen.)	Report	Sangaré (yellow card) 28'; Leya Iseka (yellow card) 43', (red card) 43'; Todibo (yellow card) 69', (goal) 88'	Stadium: Roazhon Park; Attendance: 21,173; Referee: Thomas Leonard

7 October 2018 9	Monaco	1–2	Rennes	Fontvieille, Monaco
17:00 CEST (UTC+02:00)	Raggi (red card) 45+1'; Falcao 49'; Jemerson (yellow card) 60'; Tielemans (yellow card) 65'; Glik (yellow card) 75'; Golovin (yellow card) 79'; Sidibé (yellow card) 85'	Report	Da Silva 14', (yellow card) 66'; Ben Arfa 77'	Stadium: Stade Louis II; Attendance: 6,268; Referee: Olivier Thual

21 October 2018 10	Saint-Étienne	1–1	Rennes	Saint-Étienne
17:00 CEST (UTC+2)	Khazri 4' (pen.); Diony (yellow card) 89'	Report	Sarr 34'; Bensebaini (yellow card) 45'	Stadium: Stade Geoffroy-Guichard; Attendance: 29,557; Referee: Clément Turpin

28 October 2018 11	Rennes	0–2	Reims	Rennes
15:00 CEST (UTC+2)	Sarr (yellow card) 25'; Bensebaini (yellow card) 59'; Bourigeaud (yellow card) 74'	Report	Oudin 16', 53', (yellow card) 72'; Foket (yellow card) 90+2'	Stadium: Roazhon Park; Attendance: 22,710; Referee: Benoît Millot

3 November 2018 12	Caen	1–2	Rennes	Caen
20:00 CET (UTC+1)	Guilbert (yellow card) 10'; Mbengue (yellow card) 34'; Crivelli 90+1'	Report	Grenier (yellow card) 26'; Hunou 60'; Sarr 69'; Del Castillo (yellow card) 84'	Stadium: Stade Michel d'Ornano; Attendance: 17,284; Referee: Amaury Delerue

11 November 2018 13	Rennes	1–1	Nantes	Rennes
17:00 CET (UTC+1)	Johansson 8'; Zeffane (yellow card) 51'; André (yellow card) 53'; Bensebaini (yellow card) 59'; Grenier (yellow card) 64'	Report	A. Touré (yellow card) 7'; Sala 16'; Kwateng (yellow card) 21'; Diego (yellow card) 56'	Stadium: Roazhon Park; Attendance: 23,270; Referee: Karim Abed

25 November 2018 14	Montpellier	2–2	Rennes	Montpellier
15:00 CET (UTC+1)	Le Tallec (yellow card) 24'; Congré (yellow card) 37'; Delort 45+1', 49'; Pedro Mendes (yellow card) 85'	Report	Ben Arfa 5'; Mexer (yellow card) 33'; Bourigeaud 71' (pen.)	Stadium: Stade de la Mosson; Attendance: 10,761; Referee: Jérôme Brisard

2 December 2018 15	Rennes	1–4	Strasbourg	Rennes
17:00 CET (UTC+1)	Sarr 9'; Bensebaini (yellow card) 26'; Da Silva (yellow card) 30'; Mexer (yellow card) 50'	Report	Sissoko (yellow card) 15'; Thomasson 20'; Martin 32' (pen.), 51' (pen.); Martinez 77'	Stadium: Roazhon Park; Attendance: 19,867; Referee: Eric Wattellier

5 December 2018 16	Lyon	0–2	Rennes	Décines-Charpieu
19:00 CET (UTC+1)	Marcelo (yellow card) 61'	Report	Ben Arfa 41'; Siebatcheu 43'	Stadium: Parc Olympique Lyonnais; Attendance: 47,278; Referee: Johan Hamel

8 December 2018 17	Rennes	2–0	Dijon	Rennes
20:00 CET (UTC+1)	Bourigeaud 69'; Zeffane (yellow card) 78'; Ben Arfa 90'	Report	Ciman (yellow card) 22'; Jeannot (yellow card) 71'	Stadium: Roazhon Park; Attendance: 16,975; Referee: Nicolas Rainville

16 December 2018 18	Guingamp	Postponed	Rennes	Guingamp
				Stadium: Stade de Roudourou

22 December 2018 19	Rennes	4–0	Nîmes	Rennes
21:00 CET (UTC+1)	André 6'; Bourigeaud 14'; Siebatcheu 47', 67'; Traoré (yellow card) 80'	Report	Briançon (yellow card) 34'; Paquiez (yellow card) 88'	Stadium: Roazhon Park; Attendance: 22,430; Referee: Jeremy Stinat

13 January 2019 20	Nantes	0–1	Rennes	Nantes
15:00 CET (UTC+1)	Girotto (yellow card) 38'; Pallois (yellow card) 85'; Lucas Lima (yellow card) 90'; Waris (yellow card) 90+1'; Fábio (yellow card) 90+1'	Report	Da Silva 13'; André (yellow card) 32'; Grenier (yellow card) 45'; Niang (yellow card) 52'	Stadium: Stade de la Beaujoire; Attendance: 31,195; Referee: Ruddy Buquet

16 January 2019 18	Guingamp	2–1	Rennes	Guingamp
19:00 CET (UTC+1)	Coco (yellow card) 3'; Eboa Eboa 40'; Deaux 59'; Blas (yellow card) 90+3'	Report	Traoré (yellow card) 47'; André (yellow card) 81'; Niang 86'; Zeffane (yellow card) 90+2'	Stadium: Stade de Roudourou; Attendance: 14,179; Referee: Clément Turpin

20 January 2019 21	Rennes	0–0	Montpellier	Rennes
15:00 CET (UTC+1)	Da Silva (yellow card) 50'; Sarr (yellow card) 74'	Report	Aguilar (yellow card) 41'; Hilton (yellow card) 53'	Stadium: Roazhon Park; Attendance: 23,990; Referee: Jérôme Miguelgorry

27 January 2019 22	Paris Saint-Germain	4–1	Rennes	Paris
21:00 CET (UTC+1)	Cavani 7', 71'; Di María 60'; Mbappé 66'; Silva (yellow card) 80'	Report	Niang 28', (yellow card) 35'; Traoré (yellow card) 62'	Stadium: Parc des Princes; Attendance: 43,307; Referee: Karim Abed

2 February 2019 23	Rennes	1–0	Amiens	Rennes
20:00 CET (UTC+1)	Ben Arfa (yellow card) 79'; Zeffane 82'	Report	Blin (yellow card) 63'; Lefort (yellow card) 70'; Konaté (yellow card) 79'	Stadium: Roazhon Park; Attendance: 17,783; Referee: Olivier Thual

10 February 2019 24	Rennes	3–0	Saint-Étienne	Rennes
17:00 CET (UTC+1)	Niang 21'; Ben Arfa 87' (pen.); Hunou 90+1'	Report	Hamouma (yellow card) 57' (yellow-red card) 90+3'; Subotić (yellow card) 66'; Perrin (yellow card) 86'	Stadium: Roazhon Park; Attendance: 24,230; Referee: Johan Hamel

17 February 2019 25	Reims	2–0	Rennes	Reims
17:00 CET (UTC+1)	Dia 3'; Oudin 68'; Chavalerin (yellow card) 86'	Report	Bensebaini (yellow card) 70'	Stadium: Stade Auguste Delaune; Attendance: 14,792; Referee: Clément Turpin

24 February 2019 26	Rennes	1–1	Marseille	Rennes
17:00 CET (UTC+1)	André 7', (yellow card) 34'; Bourigeaud (yellow card) 73'; Sarr (yellow card) 79'; Gelin (yellow card) 84'	Report	Balotelli (yellow card) 38'; Germain 56', (yellow card) 67'; Lopez (yellow card) 79'; Amavi (red card) 90+4'	Stadium: Roazhon Park; Attendance: 28,014; Referee: Mikael Lesage

2 March 2019 27	Nîmes	Postponed	Rennes	Nîmes
20:00 CET (UTC+1)				Stadium: Stade des Costières
Note: Match postponed to allow Rennes to prepare for Europa League match versus Arsenal.

10 March 2019 28	Rennes	3–1	Caen	Rennes
17:00 CET (UTC+1)	Bourigeaud 39'; Grenier (yellow card) 42'; Hunou 58'; Niang 62'; Bensebaini (yellow card) 81'	Report	Ninga 20'; Armougom (yellow card) 25' (yellow-red card) 35'; Fajr (yellow card) 45+3'; Oniangué (yellow card) 69'	Stadium: Roazhon Park; Attendance: 23,676; Referee: Benoît Millot

17 March 2019 29	Bordeaux	1–1	Rennes	Bordeaux
17:00 CET (UTC+1)	Jovanović (yellow card) 29'; Kamano 59'; Bašić (yellow card) 68'	Report	Bourigeaud (yellow card) 14'; Da Silva (yellow card) 56'; Traoré (yellow card) 85'; Niang 90+2'	Stadium: Matmut Atlantique; Attendance: 19,807; Referee: Eric Wattellier

29 March 2019 30	Rennes	0–1	Lyon	Rennes
20:45 CET (UTC+1)	Hunou (yellow card) 45+1'; Zeffane (yellow card) 82'	Report	Marcelo (yellow card) 78'; Aouar (yellow card) 83'; Terrier 86'; Ndombele (yellow card) 90+2'	Stadium: Roazhon Park; Attendance: 27,094; Referee: Antony Gautier

6 April 2019 31	Angers	3–3	Rennes	Angers
20:00 CEST (UTC+2)	Reine-Adélaïde 47', 90+3'; Bahoken 52'; Tait (yellow card) 61'; Mangani (yellow card) 72'; Butelle (yellow card) 90+5'	Report	Ben Arfa 35', 75' (pen.); André (yellow card) 50'; Niang (yellow card) 58', (goal) 59'; Sarr (yellow card) 64'; Traoré (yellow card) 69'	Stadium: Stade Raymond Kopa; Attendance: 12,378; Referee: Nicolas Rainville

9 April 2019 27	Nîmes	3–1	Rennes	Nîmes
19:00 CEST (UTC+2)	Ripart 24'; Lybohy (yellow card) 31'; Ferri (yellow card) 37'; Briançon (red card) 45+2'; Bouanga 55'; Bobichon 72'	Report	André (yellow card) 23' (yellow-red card) 45+5'; Lybohy 40' (o.g.)	Stadium: Stade des Costières; Attendance: 13,142; Referee: Clément Turpin
Note: Rescheduled from 2 March 2019.

14 April 2019 32	Rennes	0–0	Nice	Rennes
15:00 CEST (UTC+2)	Traoré (yellow card) 43'; Mexer (yellow card) 61'	Report	Lees-Melou (yellow card) 51'	Stadium: Roazhon Park; Attendance: 23,706; Referee: Mikael Lesage

19 April 2019 33	Dijon	3–2	Rennes	Dijon
19:00 CEST (UTC+2)	Aguerd 20', (yellow card) 79'; Jeannot 55', (yellow card) 70'; Saïd 83'	Report	Grenier (yellow card) 37'; Hunou 52'; Sarr (yellow card) 57'; Niang 61', (yellow card) 77'	Stadium: Stade Gaston Gérard; Attendance: 12,751; Referee: Olivier Thual

1 May 2019 34	Rennes	2–2	Monaco	Rennes
19:00 CEST (UTC+2)	Hunou 3', 9'; Bensebaini (yellow card) 45'; Bourigeaud (yellow card) 86'	Report	Aholou (yellow card) 35'; Falcao (yellow card) 64', (goal) 69', 75'	Stadium: Roazhon Park; Attendance: 28,285; Referee: Eric Wattellier

5 May 2019 35	Toulouse	2–2	Rennes	Toulouse
15:00 CEST (UTC+2)	Sidibé (yellow card) 21'; Sanogo (yellow card) 30'; Durmaz 41' (pen.); Sangaré (yellow card) 42'; Dossevi 51'	Report	Grenier (yellow card) 28'; Niang (yellow card) 31', (goal) 35'; Sarr 59' (pen.); Léa Siliki (yellow card) 90+2'	Stadium: Stadium Municipal; Attendance: 16,794; Referee: Willy Delajod

12 May 2019 36	Rennes	1–1	Guingamp	Rennes
15:00 CEST (UTC+2)	Sarr 15'; Bourigeaud (yellow card) 21'; Nyamsi (yellow card) 23' (yellow-red card) 79'	Report	Blas (yellow card) 33'; Mendy 87'	Stadium: Roazhon Park; Attendance: 26,119; Referee: Karim Abed

18 May 2019 37	Strasbourg	0–2	Rennes	Strasbourg
21:00 CEST (UTC+2)	Caci (yellow card) 22'	Report	Bourigeaud 24'; Camavinga (yellow card) 45'; Koubek (yellow card) 83'; Hunou 90'	Stadium: Stade de la Meinau; Attendance: 25,086; Referee: Thomas Leonard

24 May 2019 38	Rennes	3–1	Lille	Rennes
21:05 CEST (UTC+2)	Sarr (yellow card) 15', (goal) 60'; Niang 16' (pen.), 71'	Report	Rémy (yellow card) 15', (goal) 35'; Soumaoro (yellow card) 15'; Luiz Araújo (red card) 90'	Stadium: Roazhon Park; Attendance: 28,185; Referee: Olivier Thual

=== Coupe de France ===
6 January 2019 Round of 64	Rennes	2–2 (a.e.t.) (5–4 p)	Brest	Rennes
14:15 CET (UTC+1)	Hunou 41'; Sarr 49'	Report	Chardonnet (yellow card) 21'; Charbonnier 24', 39', (yellow card) 36'	Stadium: Roazhon Park; Attendance: 12,554; Referee: Antony Gautier
	Penalties
	Poha (penalty missed); Del Castillo (penalty scored); Bourigeaud (penalty missed); Sarr (penalty scored); Siebatcheu (penalty scored); Da Silva (penalty scored); Zeffane (penalty scored)		(penalty scored) Chardonnet; (penalty scored) Belkebla; (penalty scored) Ayasse; (penalty missed) Diallo; (penalty missed) Butin; (penalty scored) Court; (penalty missed) Weber

23 January 2019 Round of 32	Saint-Pryvé Saint-Hilaire FC	0–2	Rennes	Orléans
18:30 CET (UTC+1)	Seye (yellow card) 34'; Moutiapoulle (yellow card) 56'	Report	Siebatcheu 39'; Hunou 51'; Grenier (yellow card) 65'	Stadium: Stade de la Source; Attendance: 3,805; Referee: Benoît Millot

6 February 2019 Round of 16	Rennes	2–1	Lille	Rennes
21:05 CET (UTC+1)	Traoré (yellow card) 44'; Bourigeaud (yellow card) 51'; Mexer (yellow card) 56'; Zeffane (yellow card) 71'; Siebatcheu 74', 90+1'	Report	Soumaoro (red card) 19'; Maignan (yellow card) 19'; Xeka (yellow card) 47'; Pépé 65'	Stadium: Roazhon Park; Attendance: 7,228; Referee: Mikael Lesage

27 February 2019 Quarter-finals	Rennes	2–0	Orléans	Rennes
18:30 CET (UTC+1)	Niang (yellow card) 16', (goal) 71'; Bourigeaud 65'; Bensebaini (yellow card) 75'	Report	Benkaid (yellow card) 21'; Lopy (yellow card) 35'; Demoncy (yellow card) 45+3'; Pinaud (yellow card) 54'	Stadium: Roazhon Park; Attendance: 9,357; Referee: Amaury Delerue

2 April 2019 Semi-finals	Lyon	2–3	Rennes	Décines-Charpieu
21:10 CEST (UTC+2)	Traoré 47'; Dubois (yellow card) 66'; Dembélé 75' (pen.)	Report	Niang 40'; Mexer (yellow card) 53'; André 55'; Ben Arfa (yellow card) 69'; Grenier (yellow card) 75'; Bensebaini 81'	Stadium: Parc Olympique Lyonnais; Attendance: 47,195; Referee: Benoît Bastien

27 April 2019 Final	Rennes	2–2 (a.e.t.) (6–5 p)	Paris Saint-Germain	Saint-Denis
21:00 CEST (UTC+2)	Grenier (yellow card) 24'; Kimpembe 40' (o.g.); Mexer 66', (yellow card) 68'; Bourigeaud (yellow card) 71'; André (yellow card) 97'; Niang (yellow card) 107'; Bensebaini (yellow card) 112'; Léa Siliki (yellow card) 118'	Report	Dani Alves 13'; Neymar 21', (yellow card) 44'; Verratti (yellow card) 29'; Di María (yellow card) 55'; Paredes (yellow card) 95'; Mbappé (red card) 118'	Stadium: Stade de France; Attendance: 75,000; Referee: Ruddy Buquet
	Penalties
	Niang (penalty scored); Ben Arfa (penalty scored); Grenier (penalty scored); Léa Siliki (penalty scored); Bensebaini (penalty scored); Sarr (penalty scored)		(penalty scored) Cavani; (penalty scored) Dani Alves; (penalty scored) Paredes; (penalty scored) Bernat; (penalty scored) Neymar; (penalty missed) Nkunku

=== Coupe de la Ligue ===
19 December 2018 Round of 16	Rennes	2–1	Nantes	Rennes
21:05 CET (UTC+1)	Traoré (yellow card) 51'; Bourigeaud (yellow card) 55'; Mexer 60'; Da Silva 89'	Report	Waris (yellow card) 26' (goal) 49'; Kwateng (yellow card) 43'	Stadium: Roazhon Park; Attendance: 19,435; Referee: Benoît Bastien

9 January 2019 Quarter-finals	Monaco	1–1 (8–7 p)	Rennes	Monaco
18:45 CET (UTC+1)	Lopes (yellow card) 24', (goal) 54'; Serrano (yellow card) 29'; Tielemans (yellow card) 50'	Report	Bourigeaud 30'; Bensebaini (yellow card) 74'	Stadium: Stade Louis II; Attendance: 6,022; Referee: Amaury Delerue
	Penalties
	Pelé (penalty scored); Tielemans (penalty missed); Aït Bennasser (penalty scored); Isidor (penalty scored); Glik (penalty missed); Naldo (penalty missed); Diop (penalty scored); Lopes (penalty scored); Serrano (penalty scored); Henrichs (penalty scored); L. Badiashile (penalty scored)		(penalty scored) Niang; (penalty scored) Grenier; (penalty missed) Ben Arfa; (penalty scored) André; (penalty missed) Zeffane; (penalty missed) Da Silva; (penalty scored) Sarr; (penalty scored) Bourigeaud; (penalty scored) Mexer; (penalty scored) Traoré; (penalty missed) Koubek

=== UEFA Europa League ===
==== Group stage ====
Pos	Team	Pld	W	D	L	GF	GA	GD	Pts	Qualification	DKV	REN	AST	JAB
1	(Ukraine) Dynamo Kyiv	6	3	2	1	10	7	+3	11	Advance to knockout phase	—	3–1	2–2	0–1
2	(France) Rennes	6	3	0	3	7	8	−1	9	Advance to knockout phase	1–2	—	2–0	2–1
3	(Kazakhstan) Astana	6	2	2	2	7	7	0	8		0–1	2–0	—	2–1
4	(Czech Republic) Jablonec	6	1	2	3	6	8	−2	5		2–2	0–1	1–1	—

Source: UEFA
Rules for classification: Group stage tiebreakers

20 September 2018 1	Rennes (France)	2–1	(Czech Republic) Jablonec	Rennes, France
18:55 CEST (UTC+2)	Sarr 31'; André (yellow card) 83'; Ben Arfa 90+1' (pen.)	Report	Trávník 54'; Jovović (yellow card) 69'; Považanec (yellow card) 70'; Holeš (yellow card) 90'	Stadium: Roazhon Park; Attendance: 20,628; Referee: Ole Hobber Nilsen (Norway)

4 October 2018 2	Astana (Kazakhstan)	2–0	(France) Rennes	Astana, Kazakhstan
16:50 CEST (UTC+2) (20:50 ALMT)	Zaynutdinov (yellow card) 37', (goal) 64'; Muzhikov (yellow card) 88'; Erić (yellow card) 88'; Pedro Henrique (yellow card) 89'; Tomasov 90+1'	Report	Niang (yellow card) 41'; Bensebaini (yellow card) 62'	Stadium: Astana Arena; Attendance: 25,302; Referee: Mattias Gestranius (Finland)

25 October 2018 3	Rennes (France)	1–2	(Ukraine) Dynamo Kyiv	Rennes, France
21:00 CEST (UTC+2)	Grenier 41'; Sarr (yellow card) 53'; Da Silva (yellow card) 70'	Report	Mykolenko (yellow card) 11'; Kędziora 21'; Harmash (yellow card) 25'; Shepelyev (yellow card) 38' (yellow-red card) 85'; Buyalskyi 89', (yellow card) 90+1'; Boyko (yellow card) 90+6'	Stadium: Roazhon Park; Attendance: 28,001; Referee: Tamás Bognár (Hungary)

8 November 2018 4	Dynamo Kyiv (Ukraine)	3–1	(France) Rennes	Kyiv, Ukraine
18:55 CET (UTC+1) (19:55 EET)	Verbič 13'; Mykolenko 68'; Shaparenko 72'	Report	Nyamsi (yellow card) 29'; Traoré (yellow card) 32'; Léa Siliki (yellow card) 55'; Siebatcheu 89'	Stadium: NSC Olimpiyskiy Stadium; Attendance: 24,402; Referee: John Beaton (Scotland)

29 November 2018 5	Jablonec (Czech Republic)	0–1	(France) Rennes	Jablonec nad Nisou, Czech Republic
21:00 CET (UTC+1)	Sobol (yellow card) 53'; Považanec (yellow card) 83'	Report	André (yellow card) 34'; Grenier 55'; Niang (yellow card) 65'; Johansson (yellow card) 80'	Stadium: Stadion Střelnice; Attendance: 4,712; Referee: Tiago Martins (Portugal)

13 December 2018 6	Rennes (France)	2–0	(Kazakhstan) Astana	Rennes, France
18:55 CET (UTC+1)	Bourigeaud (penalty missed) 68'; Sarr 68', 73'	Report	Zaynutdinov (yellow card) 52'; Aničić (yellow card) 67'	Stadium: Roazhon Park; Attendance: 24,535; Referee: Serdar Gözübüyük (Netherlands)

==== Knockout phase ====
===== Round of 32 =====
14 February 2019 First leg	Rennes (France)	3–3	(Spain) Real Betis	Rennes, France
18:55 CET (UTC+1)	Hunou 2'; García 10' (o.g.); André (yellow card) 31'; Da Silva (yellow card) 32'; Ben Arfa 45+3' (pen.); Traoré (yellow card) 63'	Report	Junior (yellow card) 16'; Lo Celso 32', (yellow card) 74'; Sidnei 62'; Lainez 90'	Stadium: Roazhon Park; Attendance: 28,656; Referee: Anastasios Sidiropoulos (Greece)

21 February 2019 Second leg	Real Betis (Spain)	1–3 (4–6 agg.)	(France) Rennes	Seville, Spain
21:00 CET (UTC+1)	Sidnei (yellow card) 35'; Lo Celso 41'; Carvalho (yellow card) 75'; Joaquín (yellow card) 79'	Report	Bensebaini 22'; Hunou 30'; Niang (yellow card) 58', (goal) 90+4'; Traoré (yellow card) 82'; Zeffane (yellow card) 90+2'	Stadium: Benito Villamarín; Attendance: 43,623; Referee: Viktor Kassai (Hungary)

===== Round of 16 =====
7 March 2019 First leg	Rennes (France)	3–1	(England) Arsenal	Rennes, France
18:55 CET (UTC+1)	Bourigeaud (yellow card) 38', (goal) 42'; Monreal 65' (o.g.); Zeffane (yellow card) 87'; Sarr 88'	Report	Iwobi 4'; Papastathopoulos (yellow card) 34' (yellow-red card) 41'; Xhaka (yellow card) 61'	Stadium: Roazhon Park; Attendance: 29,100; Referee: Ivan Kružliak (Slovakia)

14 March 2019 Second leg	Arsenal (England)	3–0 (4–3 agg.)	(France) Rennes	London, England
21:00 CET (UTC+1)	Aubameyang 5', 72', (yellow card) 72'; Maitland-Niles 15'; Lacazette (yellow card) 31'; Mkhitaryan (yellow card) 77'; Kolašinac (yellow card) 90+3'	Report	Mexer (yellow card) 18'; Grenier (yellow card) 55'; Bourigeaud (yellow card) 81'; Traoré (yellow card) 90+5'	Stadium: Emirates Stadium; Attendance: 59,453; Referee: Andris Treimanis (Latvia)

== Statistics ==
=== Appearances and goals ===
No.	Pos	Nat	Player	Total		Ligue 1		Coupe de France		Coupe de la Ligue		UEFA Europa League	
No.	Pos	Nat	Player	Apps	Goals	Apps	Goals	Apps	Goals	Apps	Goals	Apps	Goals
Goalkeepers
1	GK	(France) FRA	Loïc Badiashile	0	0	0	0	0	0	0	0	0	0
16	GK	(Senegal) SEN	Abdoulaye Diallo	9	0	6	0	0	0	0	0	3	0
30	GK	(Lithuania) LTU	Edvinas Gertmonas	0	0	0	0	0	0	0	0	0	0
40	GK	(Czech Republic) CZE	Tomáš Koubek	48	0	32+1	0	6	0	2	0	7	0
Defenders
2	DF	(Algeria) ALG	Mehdi Zeffane	31	1	14+6	1	3	0	1+1	0	5+1	0
3	DF	(France) FRA	Damien Da Silva	49	3	32+1	2	4	0	2	1	10	0
4	DF	(Mozambique) MOZ	Mexer	43	2	29	0	5	1	2	1	7	0
5	DF	(Ivory Coast) CIV	Souleyman Doumbia	9	0	7	0	0+2	0	0	0	0	0
15	DF	(Algeria) ALG	Ramy Bensebaini	39	3	24+1	1	4	1	1	0	7+2	1
20	DF	(France) FRA	Gerzino Nyamsi	11	0	6+2	0	1+1	0	0	0	1	0
24	DF	(French Guiana) GUF	Ludovic Baal	3	0	1+1	0	0	0	0	0	1	0
26	DF	(France) FRA	Jérémy Gelin	33	0	12+10	0	2+2	0	0	0	3+4	0
27	DF	(Mali) MLI	Hamari Traoré	49	0	33+1	0	4+1	0	2	0	8	0
29	DF	(France) FRA	Romain Danzé	0	0	0	0	0	0	0	0	0	0
33	DF	(France) FRA	Sacha Boey	1	0	0+1	0	0	0	0	0	0	0
36	DF	(France) FRA	Namakoro Diallo	0	0	0	0	0	0	0	0	0	0
Midfielders
6	MF	(Sweden) SWE	Jakob Johansson	22	1	7+9	1	1	0	1	0	2+2	0
8	MF	(France) FRA	Clément Grenier	48	4	29+4	2	5	0	1	0	9	2
10	MF	(France) FRA	Rafik Guitane	0	0	0	0	0	0	0	0	0	0
12	MF	(France) FRA	James Léa Siliki	34	0	14+10	0	2+1	0	0+1	0	3+3	0
14	MF	(France) FRA	Benjamin Bourigeaud	52	9	28+6	6	6	1	2	1	7+3	1
21	MF	(France) FRA	Benjamin André	46	4	28+2	3	6	1	2	0	8	0
22	MF	(France) FRA	Romain Del Castillo	36	0	15+14	0	1+1	0	1	0	2+2	0
23	MF	(France) FRA	Adrien Hunou	29	11	14+5	7	3+1	2	0	0	3+3	2
35	MF	(France) FRA	Nicolas Janvier	1	0	0+1	0	0	0	0	0	0	0
39	MF	(France) FRA	Eduardo Camavinga	7	0	4+3	0	0	0	0	0	0	0
Forwards
7	FW	(Senegal) SEN	Ismaïla Sarr	50	13	32+3	8	5	1	1	0	9	4
9	FW	(France) FRA	Jordan Siebatcheu	23	7	7+8	3	1+2	3	1+1	0	2+1	1
11	FW	(Senegal) SEN	M'Baye Niang	44	14	19+10	11	3+1	2	1+1	0	5+4	1
18	FW	(France) FRA	Hatem Ben Arfa	41	9	23+3	7	4	0	2	0	6+3	2
19	FW	(France) FRA	Armand Laurienté	2	0	0+1	0	0+1	0	0	0	0	0
Players transferred out during the season
28	MF	(France) FRA	Denis-Will Poha	6	0	0+2	0	0+2	0	0	0	2	0

Source: Competitions
