= 2020–21 Stade Rennais FC season =

Rennes
2020–21 season
- President: Nicolas Holveck
- Head coach: Julien Stéphan (until 1 March); Bruno Génésio (from 4 March)
- Stadium: Roazhon Park
- Ligue 1: 6th
- Coupe de France: Round of 64
- UEFA Champions League: Group stage
- Top goalscorer: League: Serhou Guirassy (10); All: Serhou Guirassy (13)
Home colours	Away colours	Third colours

The 2020–21 season was the 119th season in the existence of Stade Rennais and the club's 27th consecutive season in the top flight of French football. In addition to the domestic league, Rennes participated in this season's edition of the Coupe de France and entered the UEFA Champions League for the first time in the group stage as a result of finishing in third place during the previous Ligue 1 season. The season covered the period from 1 July 2020 to 30 June 2021.

== Players ==
=== First-team squad ===
As of 1 February 2021.

Note: Flags indicate national team as defined under FIFA eligibility rules; some limited exceptions apply. Players may hold more than one non-FIFA nationality.

No.	Pos.	Nation	Player
1	GK	FRA	Romain Salin
3	DF	FRA	Damien Da Silva (captain)
4	DF	FRA	Gerzino Nyamsi
5	DF	BRA	Dalbert (on loan from Inter Milan)
6	DF	MAR	Nayef Aguerd
7	FW	FRA	Martin Terrier
8	MF	FRA	Clément Grenier
9	FW	FRA	Serhou Guirassy
10	MF	FRA	Eduardo Camavinga
11	FW	SEN	M'Baye Niang
12	MF	FRA	James Léa Siliki
14	MF	FRA	Benjamin Bourigeaud
15	MF	FRA	Steven Nzonzi (on loan from Roma)
16	GK	SEN	Alfred Gomis

No.	Pos.	Nation	Player
17	DF	FRA	Faitout Maouassa
18	FW	BEL	Jérémy Doku
19	MF	FRA	Yann Gboho
20	MF	FRA	Flavien Tait
22	FW	FRA	Romain Del Castillo
23	MF	FRA	Adrien Hunou
27	DF	MLI	Hamari Traoré
28	MF	FRA	Jonas Martin
30	GK	COD	Pépé Bonet
31	DF	FRA	Adrien Truffert
34	DF	FRA	Brandon Soppy
36	DF	FRA	Namakoro Diallo

==== Out on loan ====
Note: Flags indicate national team as defined under FIFA eligibility rules; some limited exceptions apply. Players may hold more than one non-FIFA nationality.

No.	Pos.	Nation	Player
—	DF	FRA	Sacha Boey (on loan to Dijon)
—	DF	FRA	Jérémy Gelin (on loan to Royal Antwerp)
—	DF	FRA	Lilian Brassier (on loan to Brest)
—	MF	FRA	Rafik Guitane (on loan to Marítimo)

No.	Pos.	Nation	Player
—	MF	FRA	Hakim El Mokeddem (on loan to Sète)
—	FW	TUR	Metehan Güçlü (on loan to Valenciennes)
—	FW	USA	Jordan Siebatcheu (on loan to Young Boys)

== Transfers ==
=== In ===
No.	Pos	Player	Transferred from	Fee	Date	Source
21	FW	(France) Martin Terrier	Lyon	€12M	6 July 2020	
6	DF	(Morocco) Nayef Aguerd	Dijon	Undisclosed	14 August 2020	
18	FW	(France) Serhou Guirassy	Amiens	€15M	27 August 2020	
16	GK	(Senegal) Alfred Gomis	Dijon	€15M	29 September 2020	
5	DF	(Brazil) Dalbert	(Italy) Inter Milan	Loan	3 October 2020	
24	DF	(Italy) Daniele Rugani	(Italy) Juventus	Loan	3 October 2020	
18	FW	(Belgium) Jérémy Doku	(Belgium) Anderlecht	Undisclosed	5 October 2020	

=== Out ===
No.	Pos	Player	Transferred to	Fee	Date	Source
15	DF	(Madagascar) Jérémy Morel	Lorient	Free	1 July 2020	
16	GK	(Senegal) Édouard Mendy	(England) Chelsea	€26M	24 September 2020	
7	MF	(Brazil) Raphinha	(England) Leeds United	Undisclosed	5 October 2020	

== Pre-season ==
Win Draw Loss

16 July 2020 Friendly	Rennes	3–0	Châteauroux	Rennes, France
18:00 CEST (UTC+2)	Terrier 15'; Raphinha 62'; Rutter 64'	Report	Cissé (yellow card) 83'	Stadium: Centre d’entraînement Henri-Guérin; Attendance: 0 Referee: Amaury Delerue

1 August 2020 Friendly	Angers	0–1	Rennes	Vannes, France
18:00 CEST (UTC+2)		Report	Da Silva (yellow card) 39'; Traoré (yellow card) 70'; Pavlović 89' (o.g.)	Stadium: Stade de la Rabine; Attendance: 0 Referee: François Letexier

4 August 2020 Friendly	Lorient	1–1	Rennes	Lorient, France
18:00 CEST (UTC+2)	Diarra 10'	Report	Martin 86' (pen.); Traoré (yellow card) 90+2'	Stadium: Stade du Moustoir; Attendance: 0 Referee: Mikael Lesage

8 August 2020 Friendly	Brest	1–2	Rennes	Vannes, France
18:00 CEST (UTC+2)	Saïd 82'	Report	Tait 76'; Gelin 85'	Stadium: Stade de la Rabine; Attendance: 0

12 August 2020 Friendly	Rennes	3–0	Saint-Étienne	Rennes, France
19:00 CEST (UTC+2)	Bourigeaud (yellow card) 6'; Niang 29'; Terrier 83'; Del Castillo 85'	Report		Stadium: Roazhon Park; Attendance: 0

15 August 2020 Friendly	Nice	3–2	Rennes	Nice, France
19:00 CEST (UTC+2)	Dolberg 43' (pen.), 62' (pen.); Thuram 45'	Report	Aguerd 31'; Terrier 88' (pen.)	Stadium: Allianz Riviera; Attendance: 0 Referee: Florent Batta

5 September 2020 Friendly	Benfica	2–0	Rennes	Lisbon, Portugal
20:00 CEST (UTC+2)	Pizzi 33' (pen.); Gabriel 64'	Report		Stadium: Estádio da Luz; Attendance: 0

9 October 2020 Friendly	Rennes	2–0	Lorient	Rennes, France
16:00 CEST (UTC+2)	Bourigeaud 13' (pen.); Gboho 16'	Report		Stadium: Roazhon Park; Attendance: 0 Referee: Bartolomeu Varela

== Competitions ==
=== Overall record ===
Competition	First match	Last match	Starting round	Final position	Record							
Competition	First match	Last match	Starting round	Final position	Pld	W	D	L	GF	GA	GD	Win %
Ligue 1	22 August 2020	23 May 2021	Matchday 1	6th	38	16	10	12	52	40	+12	42.11
Coupe de France	11 February 2021		Round of 64	Round of 64	1	0	0	1	1	2	−1	0.00
UEFA Champions League	20 October 2020	8 December 2020	Group stage	Group stage	6	0	1	5	3	11	−8	0.00
Total					45	16	11	18	56	53	+3	35.56

Last updated: 23 May 2021
Source: Soccerway

=== Ligue 1 ===
==== League table ====
Pos	Team	Pld	W	D	L	GF	GA	GD	Pts	Qualification or relegation
4	Lyon	38	22	10	6	81	43	+38	76	Qualification for the Europa League group stage (Note: Since the winners of the 2020–21 Coupe de France, Paris Saint-Germain, qualified for European competition based on league position, the Europa League group stage spot reserved for the cup winners was passed to the fifth-placed team, and the Europa Conference League play-off round spot was passed to the sixth-placed team.)
5	Marseille	38	16	12	10	54	47	+7	60	Qualification for the Europa League group stage
6	Rennes	38	16	10	12	52	40	+12	58	Qualification for the Europa Conference League play-off round
7	Lens	38	15	12	11	55	54	+1	57	
8	Montpellier	38	14	12	12	60	62	−2	54	

Source: Ligue 1
Rules for classification: 1) Points; 2) Goal difference; 3) Goals scored; 4) Head-to-head goal difference; 5) Fairplay ranking.

==== Results summary ====
Overall								Home						Away					
Pld	W	D	L	GF	GA	GD	Pts	W	D	L	GF	GA	GD	W	D	L	GF	GA	GD
38	16	10	12	52	40	+12	58	9	4	6	26	21	+5	7	6	6	26	19	+7

Last updated: 23 May 2021.
Source: Ligue 1

==== Results by round ====
Round	1	2	3	4	5	6	7	8	9	10	11	12	13	14	15	16	17	18	19	20	21	22	23	24	25	26	27	28	29	30	31	32	33	34	35	36	37	38
Ground	A	H	A	H	A	H	A	H	H	A	H	A	H	A	H	A	H	A	H	A	H	A	H	A	H	A	H	A	H	A	A	H	A	H	A	H	A	H
Result	D	W	W	W	W	D	D	L	W	L	L	D	L	W	W	W	W	D	D	W	L	L	D	D	L	L	L	L	W	W	D	W	W	W	L	D	L	W
Position	7	4	2	2	1	1	3	3	3	3	6	7	9	8	6	5	4	4	5	5	5	5	5	5	5	8	9	10	8	7	7	7	7	7	7	7	7	6

Source: Ligue 1
A = Away; H = Home; W = Win; D = Draw; L = Loss

==== Matches ====
The league fixtures were announced on 9 July 2020.

22 August 2020 1	Lille	1–1	Rennes	Villeneuve-d'Ascq
21:00 CEST (UTC+2)	Bamba 40'; Mandava (red card) 43'	Report	Boey (red card) 35'; Da Silva 74'; Tait (yellow card) 88'	Stadium: Stade Pierre-Mauroy; Attendance: 3,975; Referee: Clément Turpin

29 August 2020 2	Rennes	2–1	Montpellier	Rennes
17:00 CEST (UTC+2)	Le Tallec 22' (o.g.); Nzonzi (yellow card) 53'; Da Silva (yellow card) 56'; Bourigeaud (yellow card) 71'; Terrier (red card) 73'; Camavinga 77'	Report	Mollet (red card) 43'; Savanier (yellow card) 45+1'; Ristić (yellow card) 60'; Laborde 90+1'	Stadium: Roazhon Park; Attendance: 4,100; Referee: Willy Delajod

13 September 2020 3	Nîmes	2–4	Rennes	Nîmes
15:00 CEST (UTC+2)	Cubas 36'; Denkey (yellow card) 50'; Ferhat 55'; Ripart (yellow card) 72'	Report	Guirassy 12', 39'; Maouassa (yellow card) 27'; Camavinga (yellow card) 60'; Nzonzi (yellow card) 60'; Aguerd 72'; Bourigeaud (yellow card) 79', (goal) 90+7'; Da Silva (yellow card) 85'; Salin (yellow card) 90+5'	Stadium: Stade des Costières; Attendance: 3,467; Referee: Mikaël Lesage

19 September 2020 4	Rennes	2–1	Monaco	Rennes
21:00 CEST (UTC+2)	Nzonzi 81'; Truffert 90+1'; Terrier (yellow card) 90+4'	Report	Ben Yedder 28'; Disasi (yellow card) 68'; Geubbels (yellow card) 76'	Stadium: Roazhon Park; Attendance: 4,986; Referee: Jérôme Miguelgorry

26 September 2020 5	Saint-Étienne	0–3	Rennes	Saint-Étienne
17:00 CEST (UTC+2)	Neyou (yellow card) 90+4'	Report	Aguerd 33'; Guirassy 53'; Nzonzi (yellow card) 68'; Hunou 89'	Stadium: Stade Geoffroy-Guichard; Referee: Benoît Bastien

4 October 2020 6	Rennes	2–2	Reims	Rennes
17:00 CEST (UTC+2)	Raphinha 24'; Da Silva (yellow card) 35', (goal) 37'; Tait (yellow card) 38'; Camavinga (yellow card) 54'; Aguerd (yellow card) 90+3'	Report	Abdelhamid 11'; Faes (yellow card) 40'; Chavalerin (yellow card) 57'; Dia 66'; Munetsi (yellow card) 71'	Stadium: Roazhon Park; Referee: Florent Batta

16 October 2020 7	Dijon	1–1	Rennes	Dijon
19:00 CEST (UTC+2)	Ndong (yellow card) 5'; Baldé 53'; Chafik (yellow card) 58'; Allagbé (yellow card) 70'; Diop (yellow card) 82'	Report	Terrier 24'; Dalbert (yellow card) 86'; Rugani (yellow card) 88'	Stadium: Stade Gaston Gérard; Referee: Bastien Dechepy

23 October 2020 8	Rennes	1–2	Angers	Rennes
21:00 CEST (UTC+2)	Nzonzi (yellow card) 11'; Hunou 17'; Da Silva (yellow card) 44'	Report	Boufal 26'; Fulgini 56'	Stadium: Roazhon Park; Referee: Jérémie Pignard

31 October 2020 9	Rennes	2–1	Brest	Rennes
17:00 CET (UTC+1)	Dalbert (yellow card) 32'; Da Silva 66'; Aguerd 70'	Report	Honorat 57', (yellow card) 64'; Perraud (yellow card) 72'; Charbonnier (yellow card) 90+2'	Stadium: Roazhon Park; Attendance: 0 Referee: Stéphanie Frappart

7 November 2020 10	Paris Saint-Germain	3–0	Rennes	Paris
21:00 CET (UTC+1)	Herrera (yellow card) 4'; Kean 11'; Di María 21', 73'; Dagba (yellow card) 49'; Kurzawa (yellow card) 86'	Report		Stadium: Parc des Princes; Attendance: 0 Referee: Benoît Bastien

20 November 2020 11	Rennes	0–1	Bordeaux	Rennes
19:00 CET (UTC+1)	Tait (yellow card) 70'; Truffert (yellow card) 71'	Report	Ben Arfa 36'; Kalu (yellow card) 47'; Kwateng (yellow card) 66'	Stadium: Roazhon Park; Attendance: 0 Referee: Karim Abed

27 November 2020 12	Strasbourg	1–1	Rennes	Strasbourg
21:00 CET (UTC+1)	Thomasson 24'; Mitrović (red card) 40'	Report	Hunou 61'	Stadium: Stade de la Meinau; Attendance: 0 Referee: Benoît Millot

5 December 2020 13	Rennes	0–2	Lens	Rennes
17:00 CET (UTC+1)	Nzonzi (yellow card) 87'	Report	Gradit (yellow card) 20'; Kalimuendo 28'; Badé (yellow card) 42'; Cahuzac (yellow card) 42'; Ganago 78'	Stadium: Roazhon Park; Attendance: 0 Referee: Johan Hamel

13 December 2020 14	Nice	0–1	Rennes	Nice
13:00 CET (UTC+1)	Nsoki (yellow card) 71'; Gouiri (yellow card) 90+5'	Report	Niang 28'; Traoré (yellow card) 63'	Stadium: Allianz Riviera; Attendance: 0 Referee: Amaury Delerue

16 December 2020 15	Rennes	2–1	Marseille	Rennes
21:00 CET (UTC+1)	Traoré 63'; Hunou (yellow card) 72', (goal) 83'	Report	Gueye (yellow card) 11' (yellow-red card) 36', (goal) 24'; Balerdi (yellow card) 42'; Cuisance (yellow card) 80'	Stadium: Roazhon Park; Attendance: 0 Referee: Clément Turpin

20 December 2020 16	Lorient	0–3	Rennes	Lorient
17:00 CET (UTC+1)	Delaplace (yellow card) 74'	Report	Da Silva 23'; Maouassa (yellow card) 48'; Truffert (yellow card) 66'; Bourigeaud 70'; Terrier 76'	Stadium: Stade du Moustoir; Attendance: 0 Referee: Eric Wattellier

23 December 2020 17	Rennes	1–0	Metz	Rennes
19:00 CET (UTC+1)	Bourigeaud (yellow card) 42'; Grenier 52'	Report	Yade (yellow card) 26'	Stadium: Roazhon Park; Attendance: 0 Referee: Florent Batta

6 January 2021 18	Nantes	0–0	Rennes	Nantes
19:00 CET (UTC+1)	Coulibaly (yellow card) 13'; Traoré (yellow card) 68'	Report	Grenier (yellow card) 25'; Bourigeaud (yellow card) 55'	Stadium: Stade de la Beaujoire; Attendance: 0 Referee: Jérémie Pignard

9 January 2021 19	Rennes	2–2	Lyon	Rennes
21:00 CET (UTC+1)	Grenier 20'; Bourigeaud 55', (yellow card) 87'	Report	Aouar (yellow card) 14'; Paquetá (yellow card) 54'; Depay 79'; Denayer 82'	Stadium: Roazhon Park; Attendance: 0 Referee: Mikael Lesage

17 January 2021 20	Brest	1–2	Rennes	Brest
13:00 CET (UTC+1)	Honorat 4'; Hérelle (yellow card) 84'	Report	Bourigeaud 7', (yellow card) 56'; Grenier 77' (pen.)	Stadium: Stade Francis-Le Blé; Attendance: 0 Referee: Ruddy Buquet

24 January 2021 21	Rennes	0–1	Lille	Rennes
17:00 CET (UTC+1)	Nzonzi (yellow card) 22'; Grenier (yellow card) 40'	Report	David 16'; Çelik (yellow card) 34'; André (yellow card) 90+1'	Stadium: Roazhon Park; Attendance: 0 Referee: Eric Wattellier

3 February 2021 23	Rennes	1–1	Lorient	Rennes
19:00 CET (UTC+1)	Terrier 14'; Soppy (yellow card) 79'; Martin (yellow card) 90'	Report	Boisgard 83'; Chalobah (yellow card) 87'	Stadium: Roazhon Park; Attendance: 0 Referee: Hakim Ben El Hadj

6 February 2021 24	Lens	0–0	Rennes	Lens
21:00 CET (UTC+1)	Doucouré (yellow card) 46'; Cahuzac (yellow card) 90+2'	Report	Traoré (yellow card) 21'; Camavinga (yellow card) 90+1'; Martin (yellow card) 90+3'; Maouassa (yellow card) 90+4'	Stadium: Stade Bollaert-Delelis; Attendance: 0 Referee: Jérémy Stinat

14 February 2021 25	Rennes	0–2	Saint-Étienne	Rennes
15:00 CET (UTC+1)	Doku (yellow card) 37'; Da Silva (yellow card) 48'; Guirassy (yellow card) 57'; Aguerd (yellow card) 63'; Traoré (yellow card) 77'	Report	Bouanga 27'; Debuchy (yellow card) 33'; Nordin 71'; Abi (yellow card) 80'	Stadium: Roazhon Park; Attendance: 0 Referee: Florent Batta

21 February 2021 26	Montpellier	2–1	Rennes	Montpellier
13:00 CET (UTC+1)	Mavididi 17', 27'; Savanier (yellow card) 23', (penalty missed) 51'	Report	Da Silva (yellow card) 64'; Guirassy 78'; Maouassa (yellow card) 89'	Stadium: Stade de la Mosson; Attendance: 0 Referee: Clément Turpin

26 February 2021 27	Rennes	1–2	Nice	Rennes
21:00 CET (UTC+1)	Terrier 39'	Report	Gouiri 19' (pen.); Nsoki (yellow card) 37'; Todibo (yellow card) 56'; Daniliuc 58'	Stadium: Roazhon Park; Attendance: 0 Referee: Johan Hamel

3 March 2021 28	Lyon	1–0	Rennes	Décines-Charpieu
19:00 CET (UTC+1)	Caqueret (yellow card) 41'; Aouar 74'	Report	Martin (yellow card) 54'; Grenier (yellow card) 61'; Traoré (yellow card) 76'	Stadium: Parc Olympique Lyonnais; Attendance: 0 Referee: Ruddy Buquet

10 March 2021 22	Marseille	1–0	Rennes	Marseille
19:00 CET (UTC+1)	Ćaleta-Car (yellow card) 32'; Kamara (yellow card) 79'; Cuisance 88'	Report	Camavinga (yellow card) 33'; Aguerd (yellow card) 41'; Nyamsi (yellow card) 45+1'	Stadium: Stade Vélodrome; Attendance: 0 Referee: Jérémie Pignard
Note: The match was originally scheduled for 30 January 2021, but was postponed after violent supporter protests occurred at the Marseille training center.

14 March 2021 29	Rennes	1–0	Strasbourg	Rennes
15:00 CET (UTC+1)	Bourigeaud 25'	Report	Koné (yellow card) 22'; Bellegarde (yellow card) 31'	Stadium: Roazhon Park; Attendance: 0 Referee: Bastien Dechepy

20 March 2021 30	Metz	1–3	Rennes	Metz
13:00 CET (UTC+1)	Yade 90'	Report	Doku 18', (red card) 51'; Terrier 38' (pen.); Gomis (yellow card) 84'; Guirassy 88', (yellow card) 90+1'	Stadium: Stade Saint-Symphorien; Attendance: 0 Referee: Willy Delajod

4 April 2021 31	Reims	2–2	Rennes	Reims
15:00 CEST (UTC+2)	Chavalerin (yellow card) 39'; Dia 60'; Faes (yellow card) 74'; Konan 81'; Rajković (yellow card) 84'; Cassamá (red card) 85'	Report	Bourigeaud (yellow card) 39'; Terrier (yellow card) 67'; Guirassy 75' (pen.), 83'; Nzonzi (yellow card) 76'	Stadium: Stade Auguste-Delaune; Attendance: 0 Referee: Karim Abed

11 April 2021 32	Rennes	1–0	Nantes	Rennes
13:00 CEST (UTC+2)	Aguerd (yellow card) 19'; Da Silva (yellow card) 36'; Salin (yellow card) 41'; Guirassy (yellow card) 43'; Terrier 52'; Camavinga (yellow card) 57'; Tait (yellow card) 68'	Report	Simon (yellow card) 40'; Castelletto (yellow card) 90+2'	Stadium: Roazhon Park; Attendance: 0 Referee: Amaury Delerue

17 April 2021 33	Angers	0–3	Rennes	Angers
12:45 CEST (UTC+2)	Amadou (yellow card) 45+2'; Traoré (yellow card) 66'	Report	Doku 45+1'; Terrier 63'; Guirassy 90+1'	Stadium: Stade Raymond Kopa; Attendance: 0 Referee: Thomas Léonard

25 April 2021 34	Rennes	5–1	Dijon	Rennes
15:00 CEST (UTC+2)	Terrier 16', 71'; Nyamsi (yellow card) 18', (goal) 81'; Truffert (yellow card) 40'; Camavinga (yellow card) 57'; Nzonzi (yellow card) 59'; Tait 72'; Dalbert (yellow card) 76'; Del Castillo (yellow card) 86'; Grenier 90+1'	Report	Benzia 9' (pen.); Panzo (yellow card) 43'; Coulibaly (yellow card) 81'; Celina (yellow card) 86'	Stadium: Roazhon Park; Attendance: 0 Referee: Jérémy Stinat

2 May 2021 35	Bordeaux	1–0	Rennes	Bordeaux
13:00 CEST (UTC+2)	Mara 11'; Lacoux (yellow card) 69'; Benito (yellow card) 76'; Sissokho (yellow card) 82'; Mexer (yellow card) 90+1'	Report	Nzonzi (red card) 8'; Tait (yellow card) 74'	Stadium: Matmut Atlantique; Attendance: 0 Referee: Antony Gautier

9 May 2021 36	Rennes	1–1	Paris Saint-Germain	Rennes
21:00 CEST (UTC+2)	Aguerd (yellow card) 45+4'; Guirassy 70'; Diouf (yellow card) 80'; Del Castillo (yellow card) 89'; Tait (yellow card) 90+1'	Report	Neymar 45+5' (pen.); Herrera (yellow card) 57'; Kimpembe (red card) 87'	Stadium: Roazhon Park; Attendance: 0 Referee: Ruddy Buquet

16 May 2021 37	Monaco	2–1	Rennes	Monaco
21:00 CEST (UTC+2)	Ben Yedder 16'; Badiashile (yellow card) 18'; Golovin 29'; Maripán (yellow card) 31'	Report	Bourigeaud (yellow card) 61'; Disasi 67' (o.g.); Aguerd (yellow card) 70'; Da Silva (red card) 85'	Stadium: Stade Louis II; Attendance: 0 Referee: Benoît Bastien

23 May 2021 38	Rennes	2–0	Nîmes	Rennes
21:00 CEST (UTC+2)	Guirassy 24'; Bourigeaud 51'; Ugochukwu (yellow card) 89'	Report		Stadium: Roazhon Park; Attendance: 0 Referee: Willy Delajod

=== Coupe de France ===
11 February 2021 Round of 64	Angers	2–1	Rennes	Angers
21:00 CET (UTC+1)	Fulgini 4', 14' (pen.); Thomas (yellow card) 26'; Thioub (yellow card) 81'	Report	Maouassa (yellow card) 15'; Guirassy 53'; Gboho (yellow card) 74'; Salin (yellow card) 85'	Stadium: Stade Raymond Kopa; Attendance: 0 Referee: Benoît Bastien

=== UEFA Champions League ===
==== Group stage ====
The group stage draw was held on 1 October 2020.

Pos	Team	Pld	W	D	L	GF	GA	GD	Pts	Qualification	CHE	SEV	KRA	REN
1	(England) Chelsea	6	4	2	0	14	2	+12	14	Advance to knockout phase	—	0–0	1–1	3–0
2	(Spain) Sevilla	6	4	1	1	9	8	+1	13	Advance to knockout phase	0–4	—	3–2	1–0
3	(Russia) Krasnodar	6	1	2	3	6	11	−5	5	Transfer to Europa League	0–4	1–2	—	1–0
4	(France) Rennes	6	0	1	5	3	11	−8	1		1–2	1–3	1–1	—

Source: UEFA
Rules for classification: Group stage tiebreakers

20 October 2020 1	Rennes (France)	1–1	(Russia) Krasnodar	Rennes, France
21:00 CEST (UTC+2)	Traoré (yellow card) 44'; Guirassy 56' (pen.); Camavinga (yellow card) 63'; Tait (yellow card) 88'	Report	Olsson (yellow card) 15'; Ramírez 59', (yellow card) 90+2'	Stadium: Roazhon Park; Attendance: 4,973; Referee: Anastasios Sidiropoulos (Greece)

28 October 2020 2	Sevilla (Spain)	1–0	(France) Rennes	Seville, Spain
21:00 CET (UTC+1)	Torres (yellow card) 31'; Acuña (yellow card) 53'; De Jong 56'	Report	Léa Siliki (yellow card) 58'; Martin (yellow card) 62'; Da Silva (yellow card) 87'	Stadium: Ramón Sánchez Pizjuán; Attendance: 0 (Note: Due to the COVID-19 pandemic in Europe, the match was played behind closed doors.); Referee: Cüneyt Çakır (Turkey)

4 November 2020 3	Chelsea (England)	3–0	(France) Rennes	London, England
21:00 CET (UTC+1)	Werner 10' (pen.), 41' (pen.); Kanté (yellow card) 26'; Ziyech (yellow card) 32'; Abraham 50'; Jorginho (yellow card) 65'; Kovačić (yellow card) 79'	Report	Dalbert (yellow card) 9' (yellow-red card) 40'; Del Castillo (yellow card) 89'	Stadium: Stamford Bridge; Attendance: 0 Referee: Felix Zwayer (Germany)

24 November 2020 4	Rennes (France)	1–2	(England) Chelsea	Rennes, France
18:55 CET (UTC+1)	Guirassy 85'; Grenier (yellow card) 87'; Bourigeaud (yellow card) 90+3'	Report	Hudson-Odoi 22'; Giroud 90+1'	Stadium: Roazhon Park; Attendance: 0 Referee: Björn Kuipers (Netherlands)

2 December 2020 5	Krasnodar (Russia)	1–0	(France) Rennes	Krasnodar, Russia
18:55 CET (UTC+1)	Ramírez (yellow card) 23'; Wanderson (yellow card) 28'; Berg 71'	Report	Nzonzi (yellow card) 22'; Léa Siliki (yellow card) 54'	Stadium: Krasnodar Stadium; Attendance: 8,747; Referee: Willie Collum (Scotland)

8 December 2020 6	Rennes (France)	1–3	(Spain) Sevilla	Rennes, France
21:00 CET (UTC+1)	Traoré (yellow card) 23'; Grenier (yellow card) 45'; Da Silva (yellow card) 62'; Soppy (yellow card) 72'; Rutter 86' (pen.)	Report	En-Nesyri (yellow card) 23', (goal) 45+2', 81'; Koundé 32'; Rekik (yellow card) 50'	Stadium: Roazhon Park; Attendance: 0 Referee: Bartosz Frankowski (Poland)

== Statistics ==
=== Appearances and goals ===
No.	Pos	Nat	Player	Total		Ligue 1		Coupe de France		UEFA Champions League	
No.	Pos	Nat	Player	Apps	Goals	Apps	Goals	Apps	Goals	Apps	Goals
Goalkeepers
1	GK	(France) FRA	Romain Salin	17	0	15	0	0	0	2	0
16	GK	(Senegal) SEN	Alfred Gomis	29	0	24	0	1	0	4	0
30	GK	(Democratic Republic of the Congo) COD	Pépé Bonet	0	0	0	0	0	0	0	0
Defenders
3	DF	(France) FRA	Damien Da Silva	37	4	30	4	1	0	6	0
4	DF	(France) FRA	Gerzino Nyamsi	17	1	10+4	1	1	0	2	0
5	DF	(Brazil) BRA	Dalbert	18	0	3+10	0	0+1	0	3+1	0
6	DF	(Morocco) MAR	Nayef Aguerd	40	3	35	3	1	0	2+2	0
17	DF	(France) FRA	Faitout Maouassa	26	0	13+10	0	1	0	1+1	0
27	DF	(Mali) MLI	Hamari Traoré	42	1	34+1	1	1	0	6	0
31	DF	(France) FRA	Adrien Truffert	34	1	23+6	1	0	0	2+3	0
34	DF	(France) FRA	Brandon Soppy	12	0	5+5	0	0	0	2	0
36	DF	(France) FRA	Namakoro Diallo	0	0	0	0	0	0	0	0
Midfielders
8	MF	(France) FRA	Clément Grenier	28	4	12+11	4	0	0	2+3	0
10	MF	(France) FRA	Eduardo Camavinga	39	1	28+7	1	0	0	4	0
12	MF	(France) FRA	James Lea Siliki	12	0	3+4	0	0+1	0	3+1	0
14	MF	(France) FRA	Benjamin Bourigeaud	43	6	29+8	6	1	0	5	0
15	MF	(France) FRA	Steven Nzonzi	39	1	33+1	1	0	0	5	0
19	MF	(France) FRA	Yann Gboho	15	0	2+8	0	0+1	0	1+3	0
20	MF	(France) FRA	Flavien Tait	26	1	16+7	1	0	0	0+3	0
23	MF	(France) FRA	Adrien Hunou	24	4	5+15	4	1	0	1+2	0
28	MF	(France) FRA	Jonas Martin	14	0	6+6	0	1	0	1	0
32	MF	(France) FRA	Andy Diouf	1	0	0+1	0	0	0	0	0
33	MF	(France) FRA	Chimuanya Ugochukwu	3	0	1+2	0	0	0	0	0
Forwards
7	FW	(France) FRA	Martin Terrier	38	9	30+4	9	0+1	0	3	0
9	FW	(France) FRA	Serhou Guirassy	32	13	19+8	10	0+1	1	4	2
18	FW	(Belgium) BEL	Jérémy Doku	37	2	26+4	2	1	0	4+2	0
22	FW	(France) FRA	Romain Del Castillo	31	0	5+21	0	1	0	1+3	0
35	MF	(France) FRA	Matthis Abline	1	0	0+1	0	0	0	0	0
Players transferred out during the season
16	GK	(Senegal) SEN	Édouard Mendy	1	0	1	0	0	0	0	0
2	DF	(France) FRA	Sacha Boey	2	0	2	0	0	0	0	0
24	DF	(France) FRA	Lilian Brassier	0	0	0	0	0	0	0	0
24	DF	(Italy) ITA	Daniele Rugani	2	0	1	0	0	0	1	0
26	DF	(France) FRA	Jérémy Gelin	0	0	0	0	0	0	0	0
7	MF	(Brazil) BRA	Raphinha	6	1	5+1	1	0	0	0	0
43	MF	(France) FRA	Hakim El Mokeddem	0	0	0	0	0	0	0	0
9	FW	(France) FRA	Theoson Siebatcheu	0	0	0	0	0	0	0	0
11	FW	(Senegal) SEN	M'Baye Niang	12	1	4+5	1	0	0	1+2	0
25	FW	(France) FRA	Armand Laurienté	0	0	0	0	0	0	0	0
32	FW	(France) FRA	Lucas Da Cunha	0	0	0	0	0	0	0	0
35	FW	(France) FRA	Georginio Rutter	5	1	0+4	0	0	0	0+1	1

Last updated: 23 May 2021
Source: Competitions

=== Goalscorers ===
As of 23 May 2021

Rank	No.	Pos.	Nat.	Name	Ligue 1	Coupe de France	Champions League	Total
1	18	FW	(France)	Serhou Guirassy	10	1	2	13
2	21	FW	(France)	Martin Terrier	9	0	0	9
3	14	MF	(France)	Benjamin Bourigeaud	6	0	0	6
4	3	DF	(France)	Damien Da Silva	4	0	0	4
4	23	MF	(France)	Adrien Hunou	4	0	0	4
6	6	DF	(Morocco)	Nayef Aguerd	3	0	0	3
6	8	MF	(France)	Clément Grenier	3	0	0	3
8	18	FW	(Belgium)	Jérémy Doku	2	0	0	2
9	4	DF	(France)	Gerzino Nyamsi	1	0	0	1
9	7	MF	(Brazil)	Raphinha	1	0	0	1
9	10	MF	(France)	Eduardo Camavinga	1	0	0	1
9	11	FW	(Senegal)	M'Baye Niang	1	0	0	1
9	15	MF	(France)	Steven Nzonzi	1	0	0	1
9	20	MF	(France)	Flavien Tait	1	0	0	1
9	27	DF	(Mali)	Hamari Traoré	1	0	0	1
9	31	DF	(France)	Adrien Truffert	1	0	0	1
9	35	FW	(France)	Georginio Rutter	0	0	1	1
Own goals					2	0	0	2
Totals					52	1	3	56

== See also ==
- Stade Rennais FC
- Stade Rennais FC Training Centre
