= 2019 Coupe de France final =

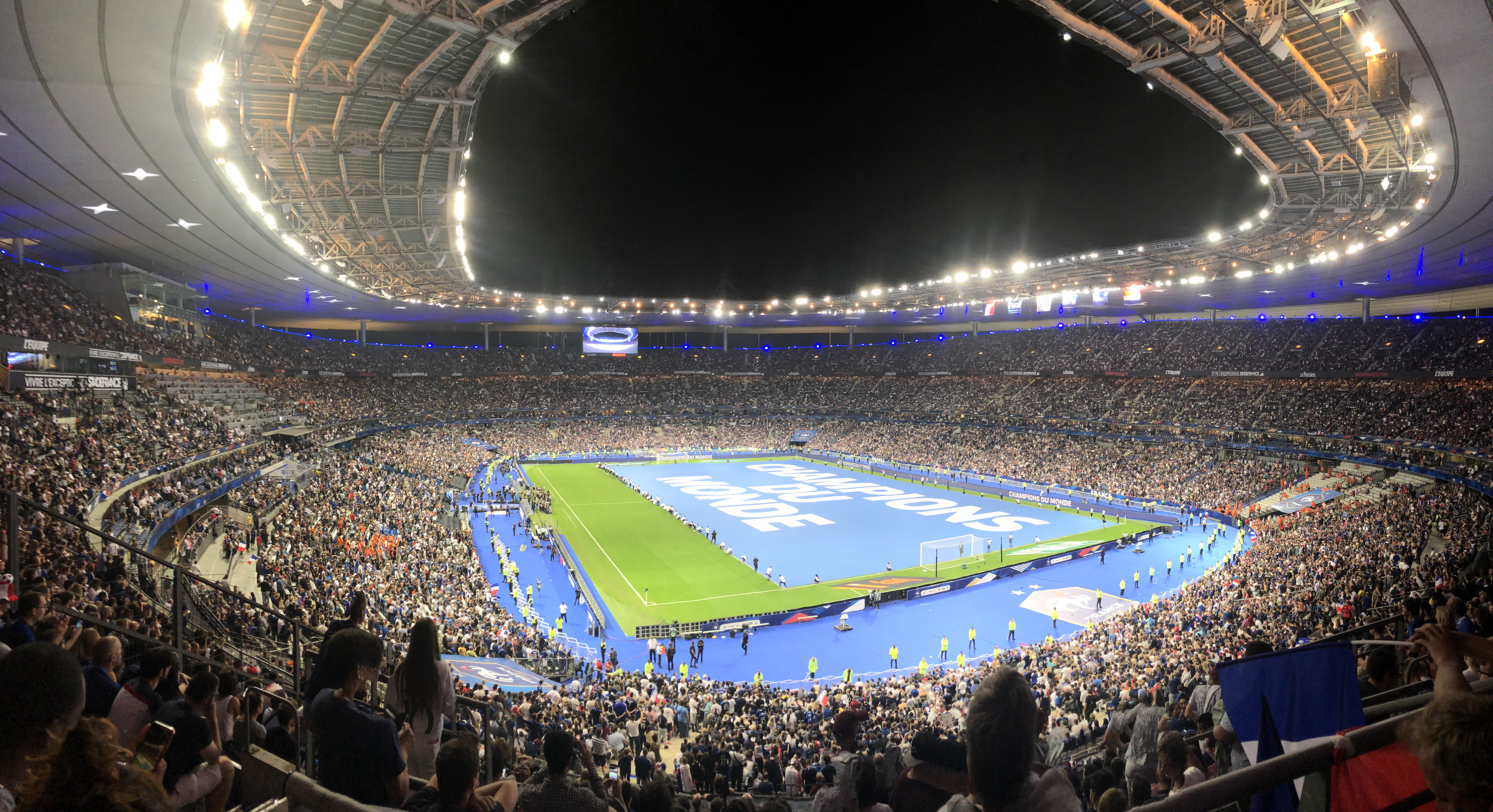
- The Stade de France hosted the final
- Event: 2018–19 Coupe de France
Rennes	Paris Saint-Germain
Ligue 1	Ligue 1
2	2
- After extra time Rennes won 6–5 on penalties
- Date: 27 April 2019
- Venue: Stade de France, Saint-Denis
- Referee: Ruddy Buquet
- Attendance: 75,000

The 2019 Coupe de France final was a football match between Rennes and Paris Saint-Germain to decide the winner of the 2018–19 Coupe de France, the 102nd season of the Coupe de France. Rennes won the cup, their first since 1971, after a penalty shoot-out following a 2–2 draw in extra time.

== Route to the final ==
Rennes		Round	Paris Saint-Germain
Opponent	Result	2018–19 Coupe de France	Opponent	Result
Brest	2–2 (5–4 pen.) (H)	Round of 64	Pontivy	4–0 (A)
Saint-Pryvé	2–0 (A)	Round of 32	Strasbourg	2–0 (H)
Lille	2–1 (H)	Round of 16	Villefranche	3–0 (a.e.t.) (A)
Orléans	2–0 (H)	Quarter-finals	Dijon	3–0 (H)
Lyon	3–2 (A)	Semi-finals	Nantes	3–0 (H)

Note: H = home fixture, A = away fixture

== Match ==
=== Details ===
27 April 2019
21:00 CEST

Rennes	2–2 (a.e.t.)	Paris Saint-Germain
Kimpembe 40' (o.g.); Mexer 66'	Report	Dani Alves 13'; Neymar 21'
Penalties
Niang (penalty scored); Ben Arfa (penalty scored); Grenier (penalty scored); Léa Siliki (penalty scored); Bensebaini (penalty scored); Sarr (penalty scored)	6–5	(penalty scored) Cavani; (penalty scored) Dani Alves; (penalty scored) Paredes; (penalty scored) Bernat; (penalty scored) Neymar; (penalty missed) Nkunku

Stade de France, Saint-Denis
Attendance: 75,000
Referee: Ruddy Buquet

Rennes	Paris Saint-Germain

GK	40	(Czech Republic) Tomáš Koubek
RB	27	(Mali) Hamari Traoré
CB	3	(France) Damien Da Silva
CB	4	(Mozambique) Mexer	(yellow card) 68'
LB	15	(Algeria) Ramy Bensebaini	(yellow card) 112'
CM	21	(France) Benjamin André (c)	(yellow card) 97'
CM	8	(France) Clément Grenier	(yellow card) 24'
RW	7	(Senegal) Ismaïla Sarr
AM	18	(France) Hatem Ben Arfa
LW	14	(France) Benjamin Bourigeaud	(yellow card) 71'	(substituted off) 106'
CF	11	(Senegal) M'Baye Niang	(yellow card) 107'
Substitutes:
GK	16	(Senegal) Abdoulaye Diallo
DF	2	(Algeria) Mehdi Zeffane
DF	26	(France) Jérémy Gelin
MF	6	(Sweden) Jakob Johansson
MF	12	(Cameroon) James Léa Siliki	(yellow card) 118'	(substituted on) 106'
MF	22	(France) Romain Del Castillo
MF	23	(France) Adrien Hunou
Manager:
(France) Julien Stephan

GK	16	(France) Alphonse Areola
RB	31	(France) Colin Dagba		(substituted off) 106'
CB	5	(Brazil) Marquinhos (c)
CB	3	(France) Presnel Kimpembe
LB	14	(Spain) Juan Bernat
DM	6	(Italy) Marco Verratti	(yellow card) 29'
CM	13	(Brazil) Dani Alves
CM	23	(Germany) Julian Draxler		(substituted off) 91'
RF	11	(Argentina) Ángel Di María	(yellow card) 55'	(substituted off) 75'
CF	7	(France) Kylian Mbappé	(red card) 118'
LF	10	(Brazil) Neymar	(yellow card) 44'
Substitutes:
GK	1	(Italy) Gianluigi Buffon
DF	20	(France) Layvin Kurzawa
MF	8	(Argentina) Leandro Paredes	(yellow card) 95'	(substituted on) 75'
MF	24	(France) Christopher Nkunku			(substituted on) 120+1'
FW	9	(Uruguay) Edinson Cavani		(substituted on) 91'
FW	17	(Cameroon) Eric Maxim Choupo-Moting
FW	27	(France) Moussa Diaby		(substituted on) 106'	(substituted off) 120+1'
Manager:
(Germany) Thomas Tuchel

Assistant referees:
Guillaume Débart
Julien Pacelli
Fourth official:
Jérôme Miguelgorry
Video assistant referee:
Clément Turpin
Assistant video assistant referee:
Thomas Léonard

Match rules

- 90 minutes.
- 30 minutes of extra time if necessary.
- Penalty shoot-out if scores still level.
- Seven named substitutes.
- Maximum of three substitutions, with a fourth allowed in extra time.
