= Gerzino Nyamsi =

Cameroonian footballer (born 1997)

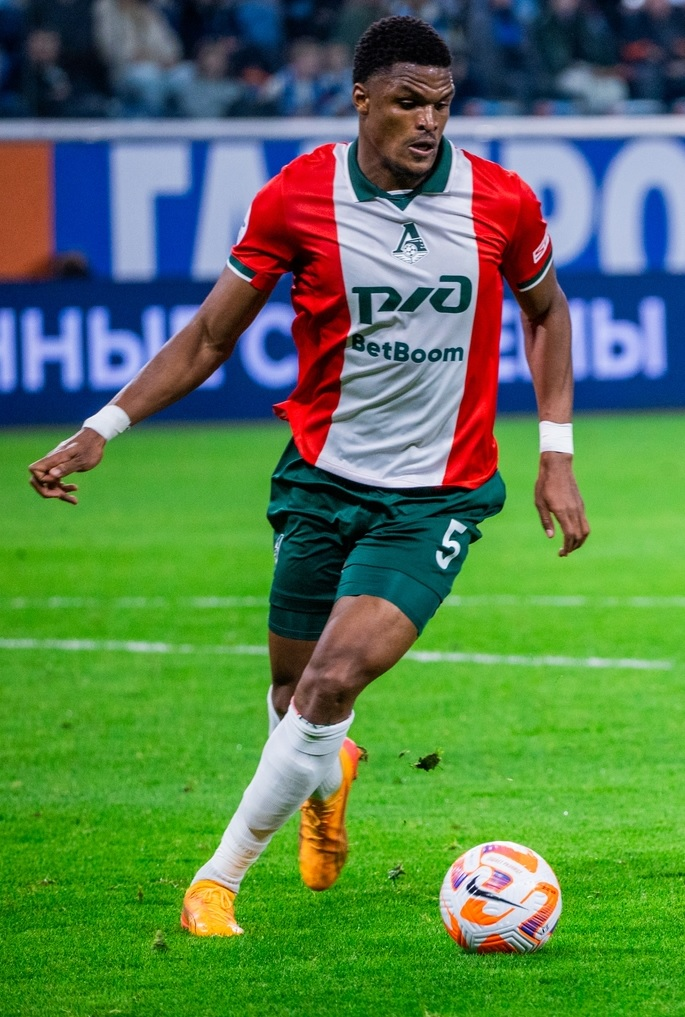
- Nyamsi with Lokomotiv Moscow in 2024

Personal information
- Date of birth: 22 January 1997 (age 29)
- Place of birth: Saint-Brieuc, France
- Height: 1.95 m (6 ft 5 in)
- Position: Centre-back

Team information
- Current team: Lokomotiv Moscow
- Number: 5

Youth career
- –2017: Rennes

Senior career*
Years	Team	Apps	(Gls)
2015–2020	Rennes B	40	(3)
2017–2021	Rennes	29	(1)
2018	→ Châteauroux (loan)	12	(1)
2021–2024	Strasbourg	67	(1)
2024–	Lokomotiv Moscow	52	(5)

International career^{‡}
2018	France U20	3	(0)
2025–	Cameroon	2	(0)
- * Club domestic league appearances and goals as of 25 October 2026 ‡ National team caps and goals as of 23:05, 31 December 2025 (UTC)

Gerzino Nyamsi (born 22 January 1997) is a professional footballer who plays as a centre-back for Russian club Lokomotiv Moscow. Born in France, he plays for the Cameroon national team.

== Club career ==
Nyamsi is a youth exponent from Stade Rennais. He made his Ligue 1 debut on 10 September 2017 against Marseille. He played the full game.

On 30 August 2021, he signed a four-year contract with Strasbourg.

On 1 February 2024, Nyamsi moved to the Russian Premier League club Lokomotiv Moscow and signed a contract until June 2027.

== International career ==
Nyamsi appeared in three friendlies for the France Under-20 team in 2018.

He was included in the squad of Cameroon for the 2025 Africa Cup of Nations.

== Personal life ==
Nyamsi was born in France and is of Cameroonian descent.

== Career statistics ==
=== Club ===
As of match played 25 October 2026

Appearances and goals by club, season and competition
Club	Season	League			Cup		League cup		Europe		Other		Total	
Club	Season	Division	Apps	Goals	Apps	Goals	Apps	Goals	Apps	Goals	Apps	Goals	Apps	Goals
Rennes B	2016–17	CFA	19	1	—		—		—		—		19	1
Rennes B	2017–18	CFA	10	1	—		—		—		—		10	1
Rennes B	2019–20	National 3	1	0	—		—		—		—		1	0
Rennes B	2020–21	National 3	1	1	—		—		—		—		1	1
Rennes B	Total		31	3	—		—		—		—		31	3
Châteauroux (loan)	2017–18	Ligue 2	12	1	—		—		—		—		12	1
Stade Rennais	2017–18	Ligue 1	3	0	0	0	0	0	—		—		3	0
Stade Rennais	2018–19	Ligue 1	8	0	1	0	0	0	1 (Note: Appearances in UEFA Europa League)	0	—		10	0
Stade Rennais	2019–20	Ligue 1	4	0	0	0	1	0	2	0	0	0	7	0
Stade Rennais	2020–21	Ligue 1	14	1	1	0	—		2 (Note: Appearances in UEFA Champions League)	0	—		17	1
Stade Rennais	Total		29	1	2	0	1	0	5	0	0	0	37	1
Strasbourg	2021–22	Ligue 1	34	0	1	0	—		—		—		35	0
Strasbourg	2022–23	Ligue 1	20	1	1	0	—		—		—		21	1
Strasbourg	2023–24	Ligue 1	11	0	0	0	—		—		—		11	0
Strasbourg	Total		67	1	2	0	—		—		—		69	1
Lokomotiv Moscow	2023–24	Russian Premier League	8	0	1	0	—		—		—		9	0
Lokomotiv Moscow	2024–25	Russian Premier League	22	4	8	0	—		—		—		30	4
Lokomotiv Moscow	2025–26	Russian Premier League	14	1	8	0	—		—		—		22	1
Lokomotiv Moscow	2026–27	Russian Premier League	8	0	2	0	—		—		—		10	0
Lokomotiv Moscow	Total		52	5	19	0	—		—		—		71	5
Career total			189	11	23	0	1	0	5	0	0	0	218	11

=== International ===
As of match played 31 December 2025

Appearances and goals by national team and year
National team	Year	Apps	Goals
Cameroon	2025	2	0
Total		2	0

== Honours ==
Rennes

- Coupe de France: 2018–19
