= Sacha Boey =

French footballer (born 2000)

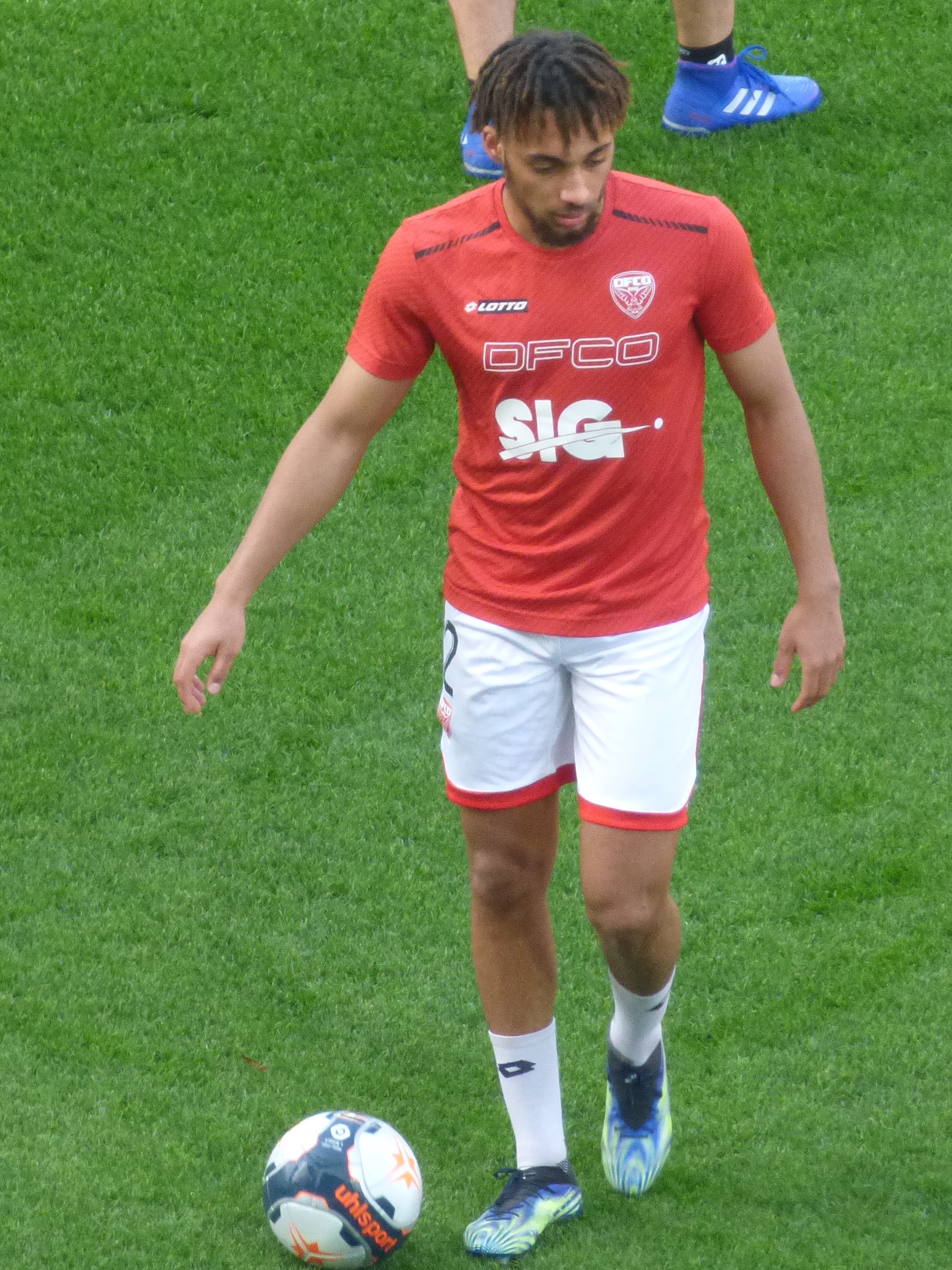
- Boey with Dijon in 2021

Personal information
- Full name: Sacha Boey
- Date of birth: 13 September 2000 (age 26)
- Place of birth: Montreuil, Seine-Saint-Denis, France
- Height: 1.78 m (5 ft 10 in)
- Positions: Right-back; wing-back

Team information
- Current team: Bayern Munich
- Number: 23

Youth career
- 2011–2012: Romainville
- 2012–2014: Red Star
- 2014–2019: Rennes

Senior career*
Years	Team	Apps	(Gls)
2018–2021	Rennes II	29	(2)
2019–2021	Rennes	8	(0)
2020–2021	→ Dijon (loan)	24	(0)
2021–2024	Galatasaray	63	(2)
2024–	Bayern Munich	27	(0)
2026	→ Galatasaray (loan)	11	(1)

International career
2017	France U17	1	(0)
2018	France U18	1	(0)
2019	France U20	1	(0)
- * Club domestic league appearances and goals as of 16:28, 7 November 2026 (UTC)

Sacha Boey (born 13 September 2000) is a French professional footballer who plays as a right-back and wing-back for Bundesliga club Bayern Munich.

== Club career ==
=== Rennes ===
Boey made his professional debut with Rennes in a 2–2 Ligue 1 tie with Toulouse FC on 5 May 2019.

==== Loan to Dijon ====
On 5 October 2020, Boey joined Dijon on a season-long loan.

=== Galatasaray ===
On 26 July 2021, Galatasaray announced that a contract valid until the end of the 2024–25 season was signed with Boey. On 5 August, he scored a goal on his debut in a 1–1 draw against St Johnstone in the Europa League third qualifying round.

Boey became the champion in the Süper Lig in the 2022–23 season with the Galatasaray team. Defeating Ankaragücü 4–1 away in the match played in the 36th week on 30 May 2023, Galatasaray secured the lead with two weeks before the end and won the 23rd championship in its history. He scored his first Champions League goal for the club in a 2–2 draw against Copenhagen on 20 September 2023.

=== Bayern Munich ===
On 28 January 2024, Bundesliga club Bayern Munich announced the signing of Boey on a contract until 30 June 2028. The transfer was valued at approximately €30 million with an additional €5 million in potential add-ons. The agreement also included a clause for a percentage of any future sale and two friendly matches, with half of the profits from these matches allocated to Galatasaray. On 3 February, he made his debut, coming off the bench to replace Noussair Mazraoui, in a 3–1 victory over Borussia Mönchengladbach. Later that month, he sustained a hamstring injury, followed by a torn muscle a month later which sidelined him for the rest of the season. In the first match of the 2024–25 Bundesliga season, Boey provided the assist for Bayern Munich's first goal of season, passing the ball to Jamal Musiala who slotted in from close range. On 15 June 2025, he scored his first goal for the club in a 10–0 win over Auckland City in the FIFA Club World Cup.

==== Loan to Galatasaray ====
On 5 February 2026, Boey returned to Galatasaray, on loan for the remainder of the season. The agreement included a €500,000 loan fee and an option to purchase the player for approximately €15 million. As part of the agreement, Galatasaray also took over the payment of Boey's remaining net salary, estimated at €1.75 million.

== International career ==
Born in France, Boey is also eligible to play for Cameroon by descent. He was a youth international for France in the under-17, under-18 and under-20 age groups.

Boey was selected in the initial Cameroon squad for the 2021 Africa Cup of Nations, but was omitted from the final squad. In March 2022, Boey was included in the initial squad for Cameroon's 2022 FIFA World Cup qualification match against Algeria, but was once again omitted from the actual squad.

Cameroon manager Rigobert Song stated in September 2022 that Boey had been contacted, but that the Cameroon national team would not "wait around every day" for the player to make a decision on his international future.

On 31 May 2023, Boey has been selected for France national under-21 football team squad to play in Euro U-21 championship. A few weeks later, on 14 June, he was removed from the U21 squad and replaced by Valentin Gendrey due to an ankle injury and missed the U21 championship.

== Career statistics ==
As of match played 7 November 2026

Appearances and goals by club, season and competition
Club	Season	League			National cup (Note: Includes Turkish Cup, DFB-Pokal)		League cup (Note: Includes Coupe de la Ligue)		Europe		Other		Total	
Club	Season	Division	Apps	Goals	Apps	Goals	Apps	Goals	Apps	Goals	Apps	Goals	Apps	Goals
Rennes	2018–19	Ligue 1	1	0	0	0	0	0	–		—		1	0
Rennes	2019–20	Ligue 1	5	0	0	0	1	0	2 (Note: Appearances in UEFA Europa League)	0	1 (Note: Appearance in Trophée des Champions)	0	9	0
Rennes	2020–21	Ligue 1	2	0	—		–		—		—		2	0
Rennes	Total		8	0	0	0	1	0	2	0	1	0	12	0
Dijon (loan)	2020–21	Ligue 1	24	0	0	0	–		–		—		24	0
Galatasaray	2021–22	Süper Lig	13	0	0	0	–		6	1	—		19	1
Galatasaray	2022–23	Süper Lig	31	1	2	0	–		–		—		33	1
Galatasaray	2023–24	Süper Lig	19	1	0	0	–		12 (Note: Appearances in UEFA Champions League)	1	—		31	2
Galatasaray	Total		63	2	2	0	–		18	2	—		83	4
Bayern Munich	2023–24	Bundesliga	2	0	–		–		0	0	–		2	0
Bayern Munich	2024–25	Bundesliga	13	0	1	0	–		3	0	3 (Note: Appearances in FIFA Club World Cup)	1	20	1
Bayern Munich	2025–26	Bundesliga	10	0	2	0	–		3	0	1 (Note: Appearance in Franz Beckenbauer Supercup)	0	16	0
Bayern Munich	2026–27	Bundesliga	2	0	1	0	–		1	0	0	0	4	0
Bayern Munich	Total		27	0	4	0	–		7	0	4	1	42	1
Galatasaray (loan)	2025–26	Süper Lig	11	1	2	0	–		4	1	–		17	2
Career total			133	3	8	0	1	0	31	3	5	1	170	7

== Honours ==
Galatasaray

- Süper Lig: 2022–23, 2025–26

Bayern Munich

- Bundesliga: 2024–25
- Franz Beckenbauer Supercup: 2025
