= Hakim El Mokeddem =

French footballer (born 1999)

Personal information
- Date of birth: 15 February 1999 (age 27)
- Place of birth: Montpellier, France
- Height: 1.70 m (5 ft 7 in)
- Position: Midfielder

Team information
- Current team: Colomiers

Youth career
- 2007–2008: ASC Las-Cobas Perpignan
- 2008–2011: AS Perpignan
- 2011–2018: Toulouse

Senior career*
Years	Team	Apps	(Gls)
2015–2019	Toulouse II	44	(10)
2018–2019	Toulouse	2	(0)
2019	Laval	5	(1)
2019–2021	Rennes	0	(0)
2019–2020	→ Laval (loan)	0	(0)
2020–2021	→ FC Sète 34 (loan)	5	(0)
2021–2022	Balma	19	(3)
2022–2023	Aubagne	2	(1)
2023–2024	Toulon	13	(0)
2024–	Colomiers	3	(1)

International career^{‡}
2015	France U16	7	(1)
2015–2016	France U17	12	(1)
2016	France U18	5	(0)
2017–2018	France U19	3	(0)
2018	France U20	1	(0)
- * Club domestic league appearances and goals as of 23 November 2024 ‡ National team caps and goals as of 09:34, 20 September 2020 (UTC)

Hakim El Mokeddem (born 15 February 1999) is a French footballer who plays as a midfielder for Championnat National 3 club Colomiers.

== Early life ==
El Mokkedem was born in Montpellier, in the south of France. He is of Algerian descent.

== Club career ==
El Mokeddem joined Toulouse at the age of 12, and eventually made his senior debut for Toulouse in a 1–1 Ligue 1 tie with AS Monaco FC on 15 September 2018.

Released by Toulouse at the end of his contract in the summer of 2019, El Mokeddem signed initially for Laval on a one-year deal in July 2019. As soon as September of the same year he was signed by Rennes on a three-year deal, and loaned back to Laval for the remainder of the season.

El Mokeddem moved to FC Sète 34 on loan for the 2020–21 season in September 2020.

== International career ==
El Mokeddem is a former youth international for France. He played for the France U17s at the 2016 UEFA European Under-17 Championship.
