= Romain Del Castillo =

French footballer (born 1996)

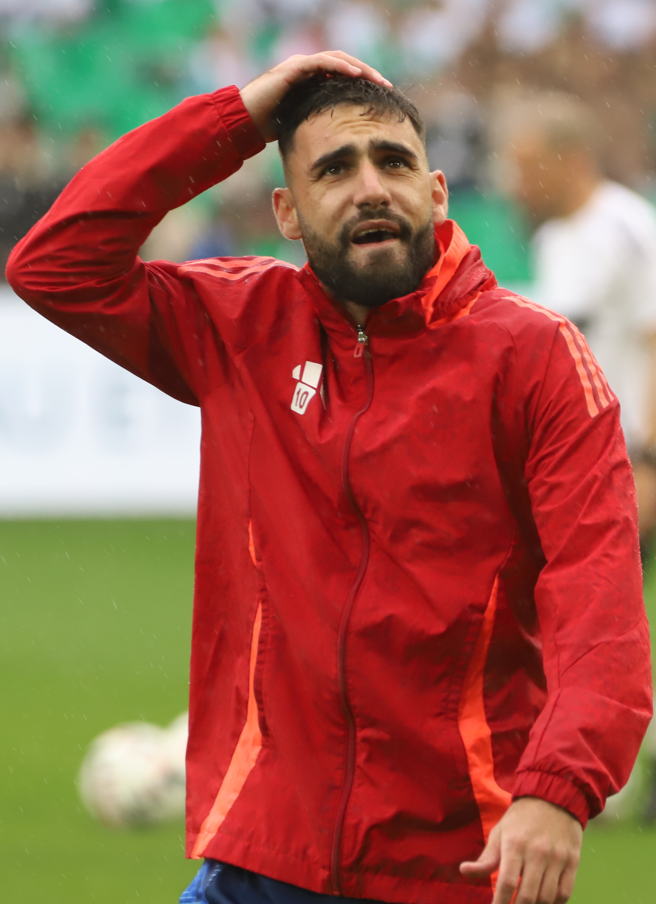
- Del Castillo in 2025

Personal information
- Date of birth: 29 March 1996 (age 30)
- Place of birth: Vénissieux, France
- Height: 1.72 m (5 ft 8 in)
- Positions: Attacking midfielder; right winger

Team information
- Current team: Osasuna

Youth career
- 2002–2007: Mions FC
- 2007–2010: Saint-Priest
- 2010–2011: US Vénissieux
- 2011–2012: FC Lyon
- 2012–2015: Lyon

Senior career*
Years	Team	Apps	(Gls)
2014–2017	Lyon B	55	(4)
2015–2018	Lyon	2	(0)
2016–2017	→ Bourg-Péronnas (loan)	37	(5)
2017–2018	→ Nîmes (loan)	31	(4)
2018–2021	Rennes	79	(3)
2021–2026	Brest	139	(30)
2026–	Osasuna	0	(0)

International career
2018–2019	France U21	10	(0)
- * Club domestic league appearances and goals as of 29 August 2026

Romain Del Castillo (born 29 March 1996) is a French professional footballer who plays as an attacking midfielder or right winger for La Liga club Osasuna.

== Club career ==
=== Lyon ===
Del Castillo is a youth exponent from Lyon. He made his Ligue 1 debut on 20 November 2015 against Nice replacing Sergi Darder after 64 minutes in a 3–0 away defeat.

Del Castillo was loaned to Bourg-Péronnas for the 2016–17 season, and after a successful season was loaned again to Nîmes in September 2017 for the 2017–18 season.

=== Rennes ===
On 20 June 2018, Del Castillo signed a four-year deal with fellow Ligue 1 side Rennes who agreed a €2 million transfer fee with Lyon. On 26 August 2021, he scored his first goal in European competitions in a 3–1 away win over Rosenborg during the Europa Conference League play-off round.

=== Brest ===
On 31 August 2021, Del Castillo signed with fellow Breton side Brest. In November 2023, he extended his contract until 2027. In the 2023–24 season, he contributed to his club's impressive campaign, being their top scorer with 8 goals, as they secured a third-place finish in the league and first ever qualification to the UEFA Champions League.

=== Osasuna ===
On 1 September 2026, Del Castillo signed with La Liga side Osasuna for a fee of € 1 million, plus 450,000 on variables.

== International career ==
Del Castillo was born in France, and is of Spanish descent through his paternal grandparents. He is a youth international for France, and represented the France U21s in a 2–0 win over the Montenegro U21s on 27 March 2018.

== Career statistics ==
=== Club ===
As of match played 29 August 2026

Appearances and goals by club, season and competition
Club	Season	League			Cup		League Cup		Europe		Other		Total	
Club	Season	Division	Apps	Goals	Apps	Goals	Apps	Goals	Apps	Goals	Apps	Goals	Apps	Goals
Lyon	2015–16	Ligue 1	2	0	0	0	0	0	0	0	0	0	2	0
Bourg en Bresse (loan)	2016–17	Ligue 2	37	5	0	0	1	0	—		—		38	5
Lyon B	2017–18	National 2	3	0	—		—		—		—		3	0
Nîmes (loan)	2017–18	Ligue 2	31	4	3	0	0	0	—		—		34	4
Rennes	2018–19	Ligue 1	29	0	2	0	1	0	4 (Note: Appearances in UEFA Europa League)	0	—		36	0
Rennes	2019–20	Ligue 1	21	2	5	0	1	0	5	0	1 (Note: Appearance in Trophée des champions)	0	33	2
Rennes	2020–21	Ligue 1	25	0	1	0	—		4 (Note: Appearances in UEFA Champions League)	0	—		30	0
Rennes	2021–22	Ligue 1	3	0	0	0	—		2 (Note: Appearances in UEFA Conference League)	1	—		5	1
Rennes	Total		78	2	8	0	2	0	15	1	1	0	104	3
Rennes B	2019–20	National 3	1	1	—		—		—		—		1	1
Brest	2021–22	Ligue 1	19	0	0	0	—		—		—		19	0
Brest	2022–23	Ligue 1	27	6	0	0	—		—		—		27	6
Brest	2023–24	Ligue 1	33	8	3	0	—		—		—		36	8
Brest	2024–25	Ligue 1	26	6	1	0	—		7	0	—		34	6
Brest	2025–26	Ligue 1	32	9	1	0	—		—		—		33	9
Brest	2026–27	Ligue 1	2	1	0	0	—		—		—		2	1
Brest	Total		139	30	5	0	—		7	0	—		151	30
Osasuna	2026–27	La Liga	0	0	0	0	—		—		—		0	0
Career total			291	42	16	0	3	0	22	1	1	0	333	43

== Honours ==
Rennes

- Coupe de France: 2018–19

Individual

- Ligue 1 top assist provider: 2023–24 (joint)
