= Abdoulaye Diallo =

Senegalese footballer (born 1992)

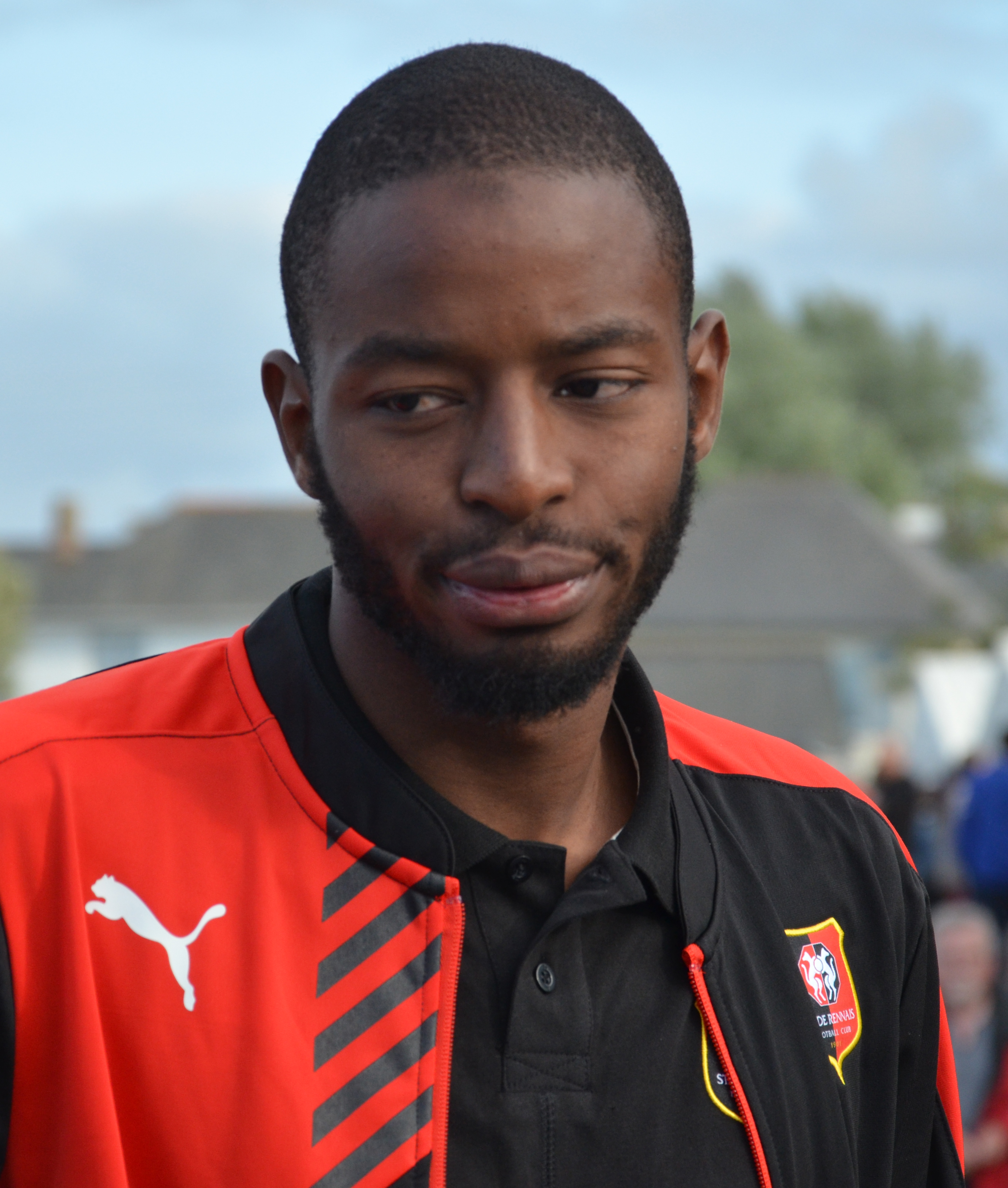
- Diallo with Rennes in 2015

Personal information
- Full name: Abdoulaye Diallo
- Date of birth: 30 March 1992 (age 34)
- Place of birth: Reims, France
- Height: 1.91 m (6 ft 3 in)
- Position: Goalkeeper

Youth career
- 1999: AS Française
- 1999–2002: Tinqueux
- 2002–2007: Reims
- 2004–2007: Clairefontaine
- 2007–2009: Rennes

Senior career*
Years	Team	Apps	(Gls)
2009–2019	Rennes	18	(0)
2010–2016	Rennes II	41	(0)
2014–2016	→ Le Havre (loan)	50	(0)
2016–2017	→ Çaykur Rizespor (loan)	19	(0)
2019–2020	Gençlerbirliği	4	(0)
2020–2021	Nottingham Forest	0	(0)
2022–2023	Nancy	2	(0)
Total		134	(0)

International career^{‡}
2010–2011	France U19	10	(0)
2011–2012	France U20	10	(0)
2015–2019	Senegal	17	(0)
Medal record
Men's football
Representing Senegal
Africa Cup of Nations
Runner-up	2019 Egypt
- * Club domestic league appearances and goals as of 26 May 2023 ‡ National team caps and goals as of 13:02, 12 June 2019 (UTC)

Abdoulaye Diallo (born 30 March 1992) is a former professional footballer who plays as a goalkeeper. He is a graduate of the Clairefontaine Academy and joined Rennes in 2007. Diallo made his professional debut, at the age of 17, on 29 November 2009, in a league match against Lyon. Born in France, he represented that nation's under-20 team, before switching to Senegal, representing his parents' country of birth.

== Club career ==
=== Early career ===
Diallo began his football career playing for his hometown club Stade Reims, joining the club as a youth player. In 2004, he was selected to attend the Clairefontaine academy and spent three years at the facility training at the academy during the weekdays and playing for Reims on the weekend. He was the youngest player in his class and the only one born in 1992. Prior to leaving Clairefontaine, Diallo agreed to join the nationally recognized youth academy of Stade Rennais on an aspirant (youth) contract. Rennes had been scouting the player since 2004.

=== Rennes ===
Diallo joined Rennes and was among a host of internationally recognized youth talents the club had comprised. These talents included youth internationals Elliot Sorin, Wesley Yamnaine, Jérémy Helan, who played for Manchester City in England, Abdoulaye Doucouré, and Axel Ngando. Diallo initially joined the club's under-18 team who were playing in their own league, the under-18 Championnat National. Rennes finished in 4th-place position, missing out on the playoffs. The 2008–09 season saw Diallo earn a place in the club's Coupe Gambardella team with the club attempting to defend their title from the previous season. In the tournament, the goalkeeper appeared in three matches and conceded four goals. Rennes suffered elimination in the Round of 16 losing to Le Havre.

Diallo was promoted to the club's Championnat de France amateur team for the 2009–10 season. He made his debut on 15 August 2009, earning a clean sheet in the team's 2–0 victory over US Sénart-Moissy. Diallo appeared in four more matches, before earning a call-up to the senior team on 20 November by manager Frédéric Antonetti for their league match against Le Mans in place of injured backup goalkeeper Cheikh N'Diaye. Antonetti preferred the 17-year-old ahead of Patrice Luzi and Florent Petit, the third and fourth goalkeeper, respectively. Diallo appeared on the bench in the Le Mans match, with Rennes earning a 2–1 victory. The following week, Diallo was named the starting goalkeeper for the club's league match against Lyon, almost an hour before the match was set to be played, due to an injury picked up by starting goalkeeper Nicolas Douchez the previous day. Diallo started the match and played the entire 90 minutes in a 1–1 draw, making spectacular saves, including an important save in the 88th minute off a shot by Bafétimbi Gomis.

On 18 April 2010, Diallo signed his first professional contract, agreeing to a three-year deal.

=== Gençlerbirliği ===
On 28 June 2019, Diallo signed with Turkish club Gençlerbirliği.

=== Nottingham Forest ===
Following his release from Gençlerbirliği, Diallo joined EFL Championship side Nottingham Forest on 14 September 2020.

== International career ==
Diallo was called up to the Senegal national team for the first time in March 2015, for the friendly matches against Ghana and Le Havre on 28 March and 31 March 2015.

In May 2018, Diallo was named in the Senegal national team's 23-man squad for the 2018 FIFA World Cup in Russia. He also participated in the 2017 and 2019 Africa Cup of Nations.

== Career statistics ==
=== Club ===
As of match played 26 May 2023

Appearances and goals by club, season and competition
Club	Season	League			National Cup		League Cup		Other		Total	
Club	Season	Division	Apps	Goals	Apps	Goals	Apps	Goals	Apps	Goals	Apps	Goals
Rennes II	2010–11	CFA	18	0	—		—		—		18	0
Rennes II	2012–13	CFA 2	10	0	—		—		—		10	0
Rennes II	2013–14	CFA 2	8	0	—		—		—		8	0
Rennes II	2015–16	CFA 2	3	0	—		—		—		3	0
Rennes II	2018–19	Championnat National 3	2	0	—		—		—		2	0
Rennes II	Total		41	0	—		—		—		41	0
Rennes	2009–10	Ligue 1	1	0	0	0	0	0	—		1	0
Rennes	2010–11	Ligue 1	0	0	0	0	0	0	—		0	0
Rennes	2011–12	Ligue 1	1	0	0	0	1	0	1 (Note: Appearances in UEFA Europa League)	0	3	0
Rennes	2012–13	Ligue 1	0	0	1	0	1	0	—		2	0
Rennes	2013–14	Ligue 1	0	0	0	0	0	0	—		0	0
Rennes	2014–15	Ligue 1	0	0	0	0	0	0	—		0	0
Rennes	2015–16	Ligue 1	7	0	0	0	2	0	—		9	0
Rennes	2016–17	Ligue 1	0	0	0	0	0	0	—		0	0
Rennes	2017–18	Ligue 1	3	0	1	0	4	0	—		8	0
Rennes	2018–19	Ligue 1	6	0	0	0	0	0	3	0	9	0
Rennes	Total		18	0	2	0	8	0	4	0	32	0
Le Havre (loan)	2013–14	Ligue 2	16	0	0	0	0	0	—		16	0
Le Havre (loan)	2014–15	Ligue 2	34	0	0	0	1	0	—		35	0
Le Havre (loan)	Total		50	0	0	0	1	0	—		51	0
Çaykur Rizespor (loan)	2016–17	Süper Lig	19	0	0	0	—		—		19	0
Gençlerbirliği	2019–20	Süper Lig	4	0	1	0	—		—		5	0
Nottingham Forest	2020–21	Championship	0	0	0	0	0	0	—		0	0
Nancy	2022–23	Championnat National	2	0	0	0	—		—		2	0
Career total			134	0	3	0	9	0	4	0	150	0

=== International ===
As of 12 June 2019

Appearances and goals by national team and year
National team	Year	Apps	Goals
Senegal	2015	5	0
Senegal	2016	4	0
Senegal	2017	6	0
Senegal	2018	2	0
Total		17	0

== Honours ==
Rennes

- Coupe de France: 2018–19

France U19

- UEFA European Under-19 Football Championship: 2010

Senegal

- Africa Cup of Nations runner-up: 2019
