= Mexer =

Mozambican footballer (born 1988)

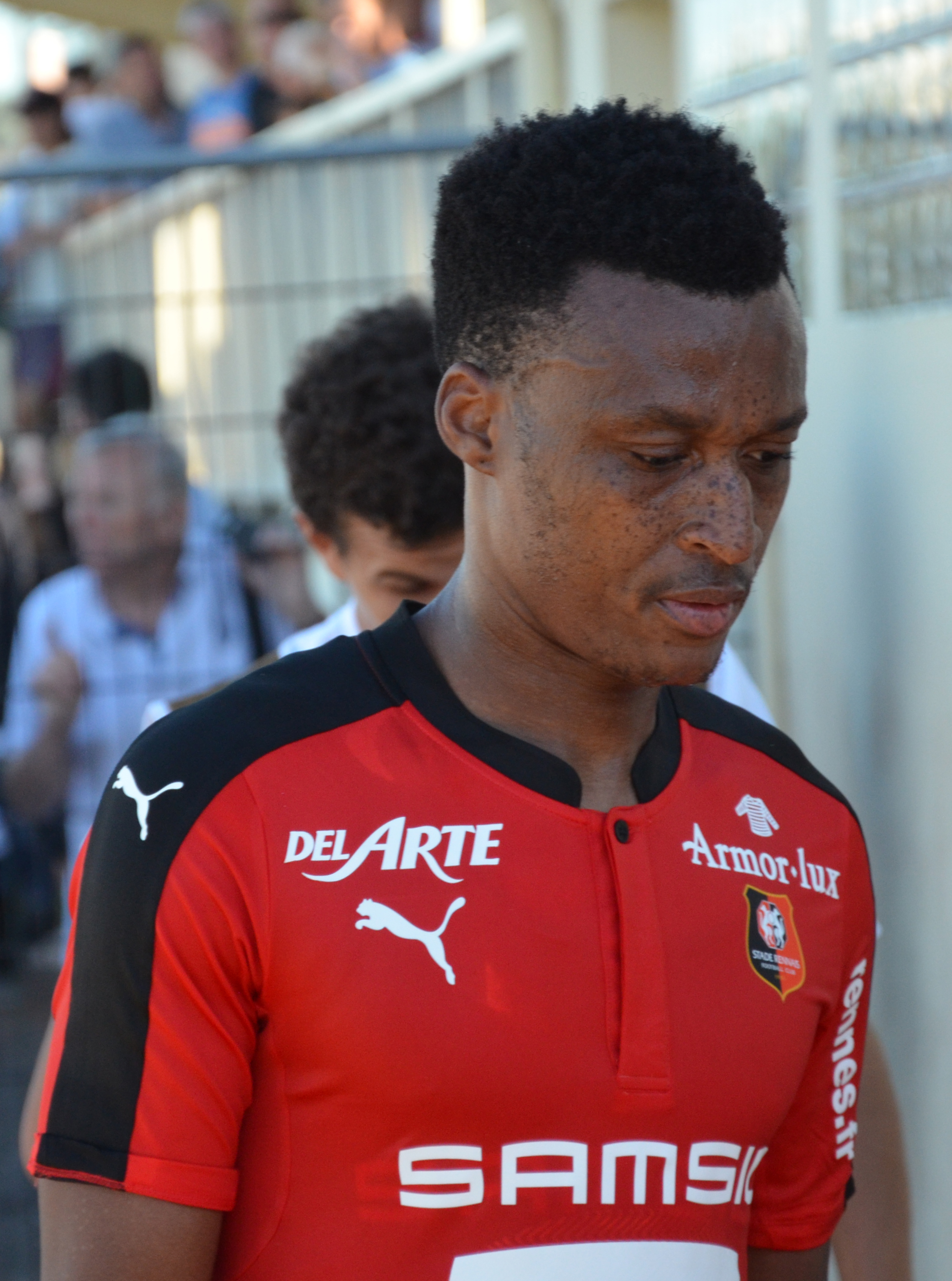
- Mexer with Rennes in 2016

Personal information
- Full name: Edson André Sitoe
- Date of birth: 8 September 1988 (age 38)
- Place of birth: Maputo, Mozambique
- Height: 1.88 m (6 ft 2 in)
- Position: Centre-back

Senior career*
Years	Team	Apps	(Gls)
2006–2010	Desportivo Maputo	97	(3)
2010–2012	Sporting CP	0	(0)
2010–2012	→ Olhanense (loan)	39	(0)
2012–2014	Nacional	57	(2)
2014–2019	Rennes	120	(5)
2016	Rennes B	1	(0)
2019–2022	Bordeaux	44	(1)
2022–2023	Estoril	14	(0)
2023–2025	Bandırmaspor	62	(1)
2025–2026	Keçiörengücü	19	(0)

International career^{‡}
2007–	Mozambique	77	(3)
- * Club domestic league appearances and goals as of 5 May 2026 ‡ National team caps and goals as of 13:02, 6 January 2026 (UTC)

Edson André Sitoe (born 8 September 1988), known as Mexer, is a Mozambican professional footballer who plays as a centre-back for the Mozambique national team.

Brought to Europe by Sporting CP in 2010, he played 110 Primeira Liga games for Olhanense, Nacional and Estoril. He also spent several years in the French Ligue 1, making 164 appearances for Rennes and Bordeaux and winning the Coupe de France with the former in 2019.

A full international for Mozambique with over 75 caps since 2007, Mexer represented the country at the 2010, 2023 and 2025 Africa Cup of Nations.

== Club career ==
=== Portugal ===
Born in Maputo, Mexer began his career with Desportivo de Maputo. In November 2009, he and compatriot defender Zainadine Júnior had trials at Sporting CP in Portugal; at the start of the new year he signed for a fee of €173,000 and agreed a 2 1/2-year contract with the option of a further three.

On 24 February 2010, Mexer made his debut with a Sporting jersey in a reserve team match against Belenenses in the Liga Intercalar. In August, 50% interests on any future transfer revenue received by Sporting were sold to Traffic Group for €87,000, and he spent the 2010–11 season on loan to fellow Primeira Liga side Olhanense, making his competition debut on 11 September 2010 and playing six minutes in a 0–0 draw at precisely Sporting.

Mexer also played the 2011–12 campaign with the Algarve club, still owned by the Lions, and only missed six league matches as his team again managed to retain their status. In May 2012, he moved to Nacional also in the Portuguese top tier on a four-year deal. He scored his first professional goal the following 12 January, equalising in a 3–2 home win over Braga.

=== Rennes ===
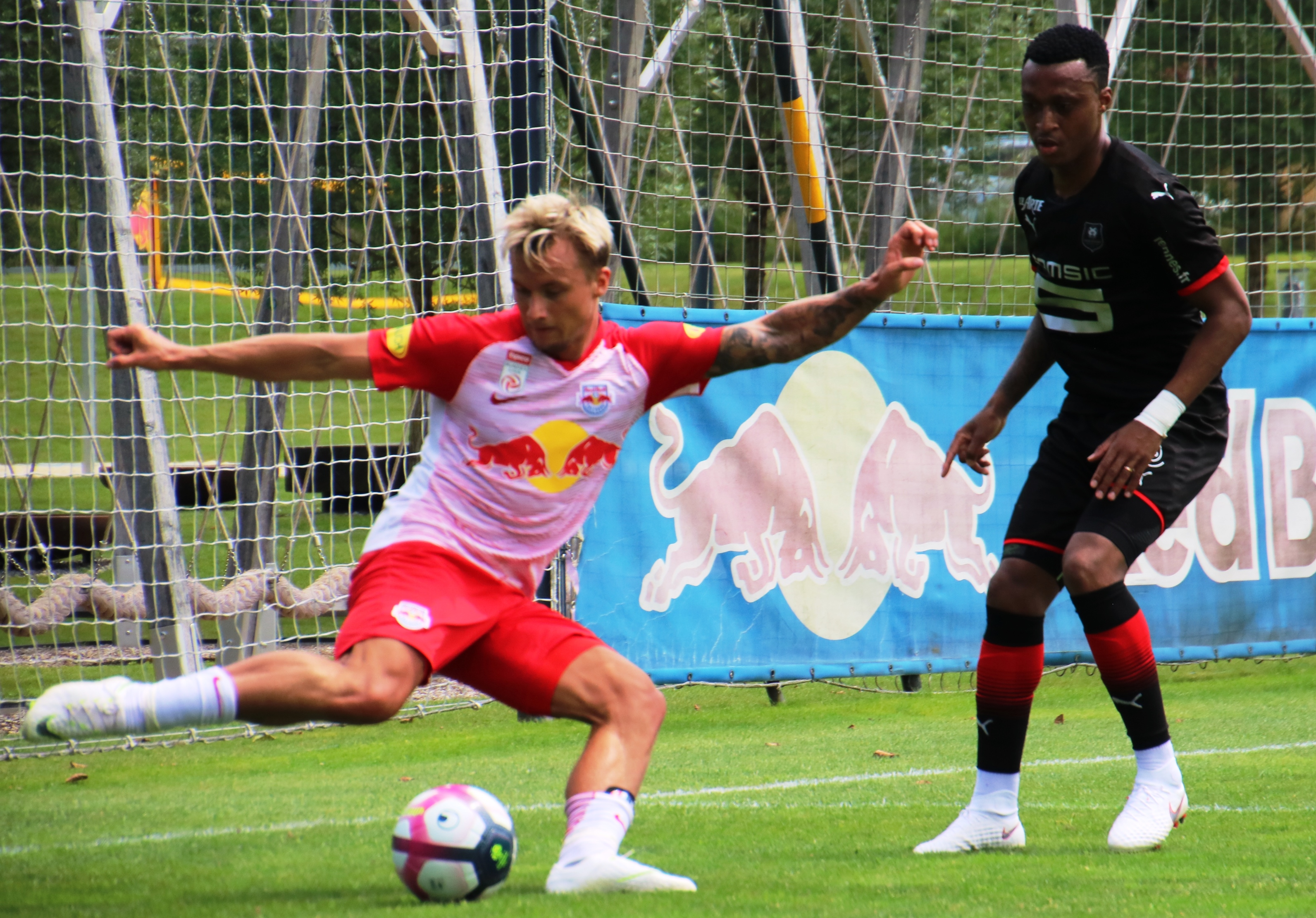
Mexer (right) in a July 2018 friendly against Red Bull Salzburg

On 19 June 2014, after a failed transfer to the French club in January, Mexer signed with Rennes on a three-year deal. In only his second appearance in Ligue 1, on 16 August, he contributed two goals in a 6–2 home victory over Evian.

In February 2016, despite consistent injuries, Mexer extended his contract until the summer of 2019. He took part in his first European competition in the 2018–19 UEFA Europa League, reaching the last 16.

Mexer played the full 120 minutes and scored the 2–2 equaliser against Paris Saint-Germain in the final of the Coupe de France on 27 April 2019, helping his team win the competition for the third time in their 118-year history after being down 2–0.

=== Bordeaux ===
After the expiration of his Rennes contract, Mexer was the subject of interest from Rangers of the Scottish Premiership, and met with manager Steven Gerrard. However, he opted to remain in France, signing a four-year deal at Bordeaux on 9 May 2019. In 2020–21, he was limited by recurrent thigh injuries.

On 26 September 2021, Mexer scored his first goal for the Girondins, a late equaliser in a 1–1 home draw against his previous club.

=== Later career ===
Mexer returned to Portugal in August 2022 eight years after leaving, with the 34-year-old agreeing to a one-year contract at Estoril. On 25 July 2023, he joined Bandırmaspor of the Turkish TFF 1. Lig on a two-year deal.

== International career ==
Mexer made his debut for Mozambique on 29 September 2007, in a 3–0 loss to Zambia in the semi-finals of the COSAFA Cup. In the following year's edition, he was part of the squad that came runners-up, but did not play in the final against South Africa. He represented the nation at the 2010 Africa Cup of Nations, a group stage elimination in Angola.

On 18 May 2014, Mexer scored his first international goal in a 5–0 home rout of South Sudan in the first leg of the first round of 2015 Africa Cup of Nations qualification.

=== International goals ===
As of 14 November 2019
Scores and results list Mozambique's goal tally first, score column indicates score after each Mexer goal.

List of international goals scored by Mexer
No.	Date	Venue	Opponent	Score	Result	Competition
1	18 May 2014	Estádio do Zimpeto, Maputo, Mozambique	South Sudan	2–0	5–0	2015 Africa Cup of Nations qualification
2	13 October 2018	Estádio do Zimpeto, Maputo, Mozambique	Namibia	1–0	1–2	2019 Africa Cup of Nations qualification
3	14 November 2019	Estádio do Zimpeto, Maputo, Mozambique	Rwanda	1–0	2–0	2021 Africa Cup of Nations qualification

== Honours ==
Desportivo Maputo

- Moçambola: 2006

Rennes

- Coupe de France: 2018–19

Mozambique

- COSAFA Cup runner-up: 2008
