= Namakoro Diallo =

French footballer (born 1996)

Personal information
- Date of birth: 29 March 1996 (age 30)
- Place of birth: Saint-Denis, France
- Height: 1.78 m (5 ft 10 in)
- Position: Left-back

Team information
- Current team: Bordeaux

Youth career
- 2003–2011: Sarcelles A.A.S
- 2011–2016: Rennes

Senior career*
Years	Team	Apps	(Gls)
2013–2021	Rennes B	80	(1)
2016–2021	Rennes	0	(0)
2019–2020	→ Avranches (loan)	8	(0)
2022	Romorantin	12	(0)
2022–2023	Boulogne	23	(0)
2023–2024	Nîmes	32	(0)
2024–2026	Quevilly-Rouen	46	(1)
2026–	Bordeaux	0	(0)

International career
2015	France U20	1	(0)
- * Club domestic league appearances and goals as of 23 June 2026

Namakoro Diallo (born 29 March 1996) is a French professional footballer who plays as a left-back for Régional 1 club Bordeaux.

== Early life ==
Diallo was born in Saint-Denis, in the northern suburbs of Paris, to Malian parents. He acquired French nationality on 11 December 2008, through the collective effect of his parents' naturalization.

== Club career ==
Diallo first appeared for the reserve team in 2014, and signed his first professional contract with his youth club Rennes. He made his professional debut for Rennes in a 7–0 Coupe de la Ligue loss to Monaco on 14 December 2016. On 24 January 2018, Diallo fractured his tibia which required surgery.

In August 2019, Rennes loaned Diallo to Championnat National side Avranches until the end of the 2019–20 season.

On 30 September 2024, Diallo signed a two-year deal with Quevilly-Rouen.

On 16 October 2026, Diallo joined Régional 1 club Bordeaux.

== International career ==
Diallo made one appearance for the France U20s in a 2–0 friendly win over the Netherlands U20s on 7 September 2015.
