= 2019–20 Stade Rennais FC season =

Rennes
2019–20 season
- President: Olivier Létang
- Head coach: Julien Stephan
- Stadium: Roazhon Park
- Ligue 1: 3rd
- Coupe de France: Semi-finals
- Coupe de la Ligue: Round of 16
- Trophée des Champions: Runners-up
- UEFA Europa League: Group stage
- Top goalscorer: League: M'Baye Niang (10); All: M'Baye Niang (15)
- Highest home attendance: 28,896 (vs Marseille, 10 January 2020)
- Lowest home attendance: 20,677 (vs Amiens, 10 November 2019)
- Average home league attendance: 25,333
- Biggest win: Rennes 5–0 Montpellier
- Biggest defeat: Celtic 3–1 Rennes
Home colours	Away colours	Third colours

The 2019–20 season was Stade Rennais's 118th season in existence and the club's 26th consecutive season in the top flight of French football. In addition to the domestic league, Rennes participated in this season's editions of the Trophée des Champions, the Coupe de la Ligue, the UEFA Europa League and the Coupe de France. The season covered the period from 1 July 2019 to 30 June 2020.

== Players ==
=== Squad ===
As of 1 February 2020.

Note: Flags indicate national team as defined under FIFA eligibility rules; some limited exceptions apply. Players may hold more than one non-FIFA nationality.

No.	Pos.	Nation	Player
1	GK	FRA	Romain Salin
3	DF	FRA	Damien Da Silva (captain)
4	DF	FRA	Gerzino Nyamsi
6	MF	SWE	Jakob Johansson
7	MF	BRA	Raphinha
8	MF	FRA	Clément Grenier
9	FW	FRA	Jordan Siebatcheu
10	MF	FRA	Rafik Guitane
11	FW	SEN	M'Baye Niang
12	MF	FRA	James Léa Siliki
14	MF	FRA	Benjamin Bourigeaud
15	DF	MAD	Jérémy Morel
16	GK	SEN	Édouard Mendy
17	DF	FRA	Faitout Maouassa

No.	Pos.	Nation	Player
18	MF	FRA	Eduardo Camavinga
19	FW	TUR	Metehan Güçlü
20	MF	FRA	Flavien Tait
21	DF	FRA	Joris Gnagnon (on loan from Sevilla)
22	FW	FRA	Romain Del Castillo
23	MF	FRA	Adrien Hunou
25	MF	FRA	Steven Nzonzi (on loan from Roma)
26	DF	FRA	Jérémy Gelin
27	DF	MLI	Hamari Traoré
28	MF	FRA	Jonas Martin
30	GK	COD	Pépé Bonet
31	DF	FRA	Sacha Boey
32	FW	FRA	Lucas Da Cunha
34	MF	FRA	Yann Gboho
—	GK	COD	Riffi Mandanda

==== Out on loan ====
Note: Flags indicate national team as defined under FIFA eligibility rules; some limited exceptions apply. Players may hold more than one non-FIFA nationality.

No.	Pos.	Nation	Player
—	DF	FRA	Lilian Brassier (on loan to Valenciennes)
—	DF	FRA	Namakoro Diallo (on loan to Avranches)
—	MF	FRA	Denis-Will Poha (on loan to Vitória SC)

No.	Pos.	Nation	Player
—	DF	CIV	Souleyman Doumbia (on loan to Angers)
—	FW	FRA	Armand Laurienté (on loan to Lorient)
—	FW	FRA	Jordan Tell (on loan to Caen)

==== Reserve team ====
As of 10 September 2019.

Note: Flags indicate national team as defined under FIFA eligibility rules; some limited exceptions apply. Players may hold more than one non-FIFA nationality.

No.	Pos.	Nation	Player
--	GK	FRA	Théo Louis
--	GK	FRA	Guillaume Veinante
--	DF	FRA	Rayane Doucouré
--	DF	FRA	Brandon Soppy
--	DF	FRA	Justin Gru
--	DF	FRA	Matthieu Huard
--	DF	FRA	Maxime Bernauer
--	DF	FRA	Warmed Omari
--	MF	FRA	Billal Mehadji

No.	Pos.	Nation	Player
--	MF	FRA	Mathis Picouleau
--	MF	FRA	Baptiste Gautier
--	MF	FRA	Alexis Trouillet
--	FW	FRA	Georginio Rutter
--	FW	FRA	Adrien Truffert
32	FW	FRA	Lucas Da Cunha
--	FW	FRA	Arnaud Tattevin
--	FW	FRA	Isaac Matondo
--	FW	FRA	Alan Kerouedan

== Pre-season and friendlies ==
Win Draw Loss

13 July 2019 Friendly	Celtic	0–0	Rennes	Glasgow, Scotland
15:00 BST (UTC+1)		Report		Stadium: Celtic Park; Referee: Willie Collum

23 July 2019 Friendly	Brest	1–0	Rennes	Plouvorn, France
19:00 CEST (UTC+2)	Court (yellow card) 32'; Osei 81'; Genty (yellow card) 86'	Report	Trouillet (yellow card) 65'; Gelin (yellow card) 90'	Stadium: Stade Guy de Reals

26 July 2019 Friendly	RB Leipzig	2–0	Rennes	Markranstädt, Germany
18:00 CEST (UTC+2)	Orbán 52'; Martel (yellow card) 90'; Ilsanker (yellow card) 96'; Poulsen 134'	Report	Grenier (yellow card) 79'; Morel (yellow card) 111'	Stadium: Stadion am Bad Großfeld; Attendance: 3,047

== Competitions ==
=== Overview ===
Competition	First match	Last match	Starting round	Final position	Record							
Competition	First match	Last match	Starting round	Final position	Pld	W	D	L	GF	GA	GD	Win %
Ligue 1	10 August 2019	8 March 2020	Matchday 1	3rd	28	15	5	8	38	24	+14	53.57
Coupe de France	4 January 2020	5 March 2020	Round of 64	Semi-finals	5	3	1	1	11	6	+5	60.00
Coupe de la Ligue	18 December 2019		Round of 16	Round of 16	1	0	0	1	2	3	−1	0.00
Trophée des Champions	3 August 2019		Final	Runners-up	1	0	0	1	1	2	−1	0.00
Europa League	19 September 2019	12 December 2019	Group stage	Group stage	6	1	1	4	5	8	−3	16.67
Total					41	19	7	15	57	43	+14	46.34

Source: Soccerway

=== Ligue 1 ===
==== League table ====
Pos	Team	Pld	W	D	L	GF	GA	GD	Pts	PPG	Qualification or relegation
1	Paris Saint-Germain (C)	27	22	2	3	75	24	+51	68	2.52	Qualification for the Champions League group stage
2	Marseille	28	16	8	4	41	29	+12	56	2.00	Qualification for the Champions League group stage
3	Rennes	28	15	5	8	38	24	+14	50	1.79	Qualification for the Champions League group stage
4	Lille	28	15	4	9	35	27	+8	49	1.75	Qualification for the Europa League group stage (Note: Since the winners of the Coupe de France and the Coupe de la Ligue, Paris Saint-Germain, qualified for the Champions League, the spot given to the Coupe de France winners (Europa League group stage) was passed to the fifth-placed team and the spot given to the Coupe de la Ligue winners (Europa League second qualifying round) was passed to the sixth-placed team.)
5	Nice	28	11	8	9	41	38	+3	41 (Note: Nice finished ahead of Reims on head-to-head points: Nice 2–0 Reims, Reims 1–1 Nice.)	1.46	Qualification for the Europa League group stage

Source: Ligue 1
Rules for classification: 1) Points per game; 2) Head-to-head points; 3) Head-to-head goal difference; 4) Goal difference; 5) Goals scored; 6) Fairplay ranking.
(C) Champions

==== Results summary ====
Overall								Home						Away					
Pld	W	D	L	GF	GA	GD	Pts	W	D	L	GF	GA	GD	W	D	L	GF	GA	GD
28	15	5	8	38	24	+14	50	9	2	3	25	14	+11	6	3	5	13	10	+3

Source: Ligue 1

==== Results by round ====
Round	1	2	3	4	5	6	7	8	9	10	11	12	13	14	15	16	17	18	19	20	21	22	23	24	25	26	27	28	29	30	31	32	33	34	35	36	37	38
Ground	A	H	A	H	A	H	A	A	H	A	H	A	H	A	H	A	H	A	H	H	A	H	A	H	A	H	A	H	A	H	A	A	H	H	A	H	A	H
Result	W	W	W	L	D	D	L	D	L	L	W	W	W	L	W	W	W	W	W	L	D	W	L	D	L	W	W	W	C	C	C	C	C	C	C	C	C	C
Position	8	3	1	2	2	4	9	8	10	12	9	14	10	11	10	7	4	4	3	3	3	3	3	3	3	3	3	3	3	3	3	3	3	3	3	3	3	3

Source: Ligue 1
A = Away; H = Home; W = Win; D = Draw; L = Loss; C = Cancelled

==== Matches ====
The Ligue 1 schedule was announced on 14 June 2019. The Ligue 1 matches were suspended by the LFP on 13 March 2020 due to COVID-19 until further notices. On 28 April 2020, it was announced that Ligue 1 and Ligue 2 campaigns would not resume, after the country banned all sporting events until September. On 30 April, The LFP ended officially the 2019–20 season.

10 August 2019 1	Montpellier	0–1	Rennes	Montpellier
20:00 CEST (UTC+2)	Souquet (yellow card) 18'; Chotard (yellow card) 49'; Delort (yellow card) 90+4'	Report	Morel 6'; Maouassa (yellow card) 34'; Tait (red card) 69'; Siebatcheu (yellow card) 90+4'; Grenier (yellow card) 90+6'	Stadium: Stade de la Mosson; Attendance: 15,212; Referee: Willy Delajod

18 August 2019 2	Rennes	2–1	Paris Saint-Germain	Rennes
21:00 CEST (UTC+2)	Niang 44'; Del Castillo 48'; Siebatcheu (yellow card) 85'	Report	Cavani 36', (yellow card) 88'; Draxler (yellow card) 42'; Meunier (yellow card) 54'; Verratti (yellow card) 58'; Bernat (yellow card) 67'	Stadium: Roazhon Park; Attendance: 28,596; Referee: Antony Gautier

25 August 2019 3	Strasbourg	0–2	Rennes	Strasbourg
17:00 CEST (UTC+2)	Koné (yellow card) 14'; Djiku (yellow card) 27'; Ndour (yellow card) 56' (yellow-red card) 84'	Report	Grenier 16'; Maouassa (yellow card) 22'; Bourigeaud (yellow card) 45+3'; Niang 54'	Stadium: Stade de la Meinau; Attendance: 24,951; Referee: Ruddy Buquet

1 September 2019 4	Rennes	1–2	Nice	Rennes
15:00 CEST (UTC+2)	Lloris 25' (o.g.); Camavinga (yellow card) 81'; Traoré (yellow card) 88'	Report	Burner (yellow card) 28'; Srarfi (yellow card) 49'; Cyprien 63' (pen.); Lees-Melou (yellow card) 85'; Coly 90+2'	Stadium: Roazhon Park; Attendance: 26,721; Referee: Johan Hamel

14 September 2019 5	Brest	0–0	Rennes	Brest
20:00 CEST (UTC+2)	Autret (yellow card) 50'; Court (yellow card) 90+1'	Report	Da Silva (yellow card) 21'; Martin (yellow card) 90+2'	Stadium: Stade Francis-Le Blé; Attendance: 14,937; Referee: Clément Turpin

22 September 2019 6	Rennes	1–1	Lille	Rennes
15:00 CEST (UTC+2)	Raphinha (yellow card) 6'; Mendy (yellow card) 42'; Hunou 68'	Report	Çelik (yellow card) 10'; André (yellow card) 45'; Ikoné 47'	Stadium: Roazhon Park; Attendance: 25,772; Referee: Jérôme Brisard

25 September 2019 7	Nantes	1–0	Rennes	Nantes
19:00 CEST (UTC+2)	Fábio (yellow card) 22'; Lafont (yellow card) 32'; Touré 77' (pen.)	Report	Léa Siliki (yellow card) 56'; Hunou (yellow card) 59'; Morel (yellow card) 75'; Raphinha (yellow card) 88'	Stadium: Stade de la Beaujoire; Attendance: 26,952; Referee: Antony Gautier

29 September 2019 8	Marseille	1–1	Rennes	Marseille
21:00 CEST (UTC+2)	Ćaleta-Car 52'; Strootman (yellow card) 59'; Radonjić (yellow card) 86'; Perrin (yellow card) 90+3'; Sakai (yellow card) 90+4'	Report	Niang 19'	Stadium: Stade Vélodrome; Attendance: 44,281; Referee: Frank Schneider

6 October 2019 9	Rennes	0–1	Reims	Rennes
17:00 CEST (UTC+2)	Gelin (yellow card) 14'	Report	Disasi (yellow card) 45'; Dia 49'; Oudin (yellow card) 73'; Suk (yellow card) 84'	Stadium: Roazhon Park; Attendance: 20,950; Referee: Stéphanie Frappart

20 October 2019 10	Monaco	3–2	Rennes	Monaco
17:00 CEST (UTC+2)	Ben Yedder 3', 90+3'; Slimani (yellow card) 54', (goal) 57'; Glik (yellow card) 90'	Report	Maouassa 12'; Hunou 49'; Camavinga (yellow card) 57'; Gnagnon (yellow card) 59'; Grenier (yellow card) 90+1'	Stadium: Stade Louis II; Attendance: 6,763; Referee: Hakim Ben El Hadj

27 October 2019 11	Rennes	3–2	Toulouse	Rennes
15:00 CET (UTC+1)	Niang 3'; Hunou 6'; Bourigeaud (yellow card) 65'; Gboho 90+2'	Report	Moreira (yellow card) 36'; Dossevi 41'; Amian (yellow card) 79'; Gradel 84'	Stadium: Roazhon Park; Attendance: 22,918; Referee: Antony Gautier

10 November 2019 13	Rennes	3–1	Amiens	Rennes
15:00 CET (UTC+1)	Gboho (yellow card) 16'; Bourigeaud (yellow card) 16'; Hunou 39'; Niang 62'; Raphinha 79' (pen.); Del Castillo (yellow card) 83'	Report	Kakuta (yellow card) 19'; Guirassy 35'; Monconduit (yellow card) 45+1'; Gnahoré (yellow card) 51'; Calabresi (yellow card) 68'	Stadium: Roazhon Park; Attendance: 20,677; Referee: Benoît Bastien

23 November 2019 14	Dijon	2–1	Rennes	Dijon
20:00 CET (UTC+1)	Ndong (yellow card) 67'; Sammaritano 70'; Chouiar 83'	Report	Hunou (yellow card) 20'; Raphinha 59'; Traoré (yellow card) 62'	Stadium: Stade Gaston Gérard; Attendance: 12,084; Referee: Jérôme Brisard

1 December 2019 15	Rennes	2–1	Saint-Étienne	Rennes
17:00 CET (UTC+1)	Raphinha 25'; Niang (yellow card) 40'; Da Silva 90+4'	Report	Diony 19'; Youssouf (yellow card) 29'; Kolodziejczak (yellow card) 69'; Palencia (yellow card) 84'	Stadium: Roazhon Park; Attendance: 26,738; Referee: Eric Wattellier

4 December 2019 16	Metz	0–1	Rennes	Metz
19:00 CET (UTC+1)	Ambrose (yellow card) 69'; Delaine (yellow card) 80'	Report	Hunou 39'	Stadium: Stade Saint-Symphorien; Attendance: 14,214; Referee: Karim Abed

7 December 2019 17	Rennes	2–1	Angers	Rennes
20:00 CET (UTC+1)	Niang 25', 79'; Da Silva (yellow card) 26'; Traoré (yellow card) 44'; Camavinga (yellow card) 67'	Report	Thomas (yellow card) 45+1'; Alioui 90+3'	Stadium: Roazhon Park; Attendance: 25,656; Referee: Amaury Delerue

15 December 2019 18	Lyon	0–1	Rennes	Décines-Charpieu
17:00 CET (UTC+1)	Traoré (yellow card) 54'; Andersen (yellow card) 56'; Caqueret (yellow card) 90+1'	Report	Niang (yellow card) 45'; Bourigeaud (yellow card) 76'; Gnagnon (yellow card) 82'; Camavinga 89'	Stadium: Parc Olympique Lyonnais; Attendance: 45,010; Referee: Benoît Bastien

21 December 2019 19	Rennes	1–0	Bordeaux	Rennes
20:45 CET (UTC+1)	Niang 82'	Report	Bašić (yellow card) 32'; Benito (yellow card) 47'; Otávio (yellow card) 74'	Stadium: Roazhon Park; Attendance: 26,403; Referee: Thomas Leonard

10 January 2020 20	Rennes	0–1	Marseille	Rennes
20:45 CET (UTC+1)	Traoré (yellow card) 32'; Da Silva (yellow card) 83'	Report	Sarr (yellow card) 30'; Ćaleta-Car (yellow card) 35'; Kamara (yellow card) 50'; Payet (yellow card) 79'; Strootman 84'; Sanson (yellow card) 89'	Stadium: Roazhon Park; Attendance: 28,896; Referee: Benoît Millot

15 January 2020 12	Nîmes	0–1	Rennes	Nîmes
19:00 CET (UTC+1)	Fomba (yellow card) 19'	Report	Traoré (yellow card) 15'; Hunou 64'; Salin (yellow card) 84'; Siebatcheu (yellow card) 89'	Stadium: Stade des Costières; Attendance: 12,388; Referee: Willy Delajod
Note: Match originally scheduled for 2 November, but postponed due to heavy rains, and rearranged for 15 January 2020.

24 January 2020 21	Nice	1–1	Rennes	Nice
20:45 CET (UTC+1)	Dolberg 48'	Report	Léa Siliki (yellow card) 65'; Tait 81'	Stadium: Allianz Riviera; Attendance: 15,199; Referee: Hakim Ben El Hadj

31 January 2020 22	Rennes	3–2	Nantes	Rennes
20:45 CET (UTC+1)	Maouassa (yellow card) 32'; Del Castillo (yellow card) 59'; Raphinha (yellow card) 60', (goal) 71', 90+7'; Bourigeaud 90+5'; Camavinga (yellow card) 90+10'; Boey (yellow card) 90+10'	Report	Appiah (yellow card) 18'; Da Silva 47' (o.g.); Emond (yellow card) 53'; Lafont (yellow card) 60'; Simon 80'; Bamba (yellow card) 90+1'	Stadium: Roazhon Park; Attendance: 27,836; Referee: Benoît Millot

4 February 2020 23	Lille	1–0	Rennes	Villeneuve-d'Ascq
19:00 CET (UTC+1)	Rémy 4', (yellow card) 56'; Ikoné (yellow card) 44'; Sanches (yellow card) 83'	Report	Traoré (yellow card) 54'	Stadium: Stade Pierre-Mauroy; Attendance: 35,030; Referee: Johan Hamel

8 February 2020 24	Rennes	0–0	Brest	Rennes
20:00 CET (UTC+1)	Morel (yellow card) 46'; Léa Siliki (yellow card) 50'	Report	Court (yellow card) 23'; Charbonnier (yellow card) 50'; Autret (yellow card) 74'; Lasne (yellow card) 88'	Stadium: Roazhon Park; Attendance: 28,436; Referee: Ruddy Buquet

16 February 2020 25	Reims	1–0	Rennes	Reims
17:00 CET (UTC+1)	Cassamá (yellow card) 59'; Touré 72' (pen.)	Report	Raphinha (yellow card) 82'	Stadium: Stade Auguste Delaune; Attendance: 13,026; Referee: Florent Batta

23 February 2020 26	Rennes	2–1	Nîmes	Rennes
17:00 CET (UTC+1)	Niang 7', 89'	Report	Roux 1'; Briançon (red card) 53'; Paquiez (yellow card) 67'	Stadium: Roazhon Park; Attendance: 28,084; Referee: Stéphanie Frappart

29 February 2020 27	Toulouse	0–2	Rennes	Toulouse
20:00 CET (UTC+1)	Sangaré (yellow card) 23'; Vainqueur (yellow card) 33'; Diakité (yellow card) 45'	Report	Bourigeaud 3'; Traoré (yellow card) 29'; Maouassa 83'	Stadium: Stadium de Toulouse; Attendance: 13,301; Referee: Jérémy Stinat

8 March 2020 28	Rennes	5–0	Montpellier	Rennes
17:00 CET (UTC+1)	Maouassa 9'; Hunou 28', 87' (pen.); Léa Siliki (yellow card) 57'; Tait 68'; Del Castillo 73' (pen.); Bourigeaud (yellow card) 77'	Report	Savanier (yellow card) 25'; Sambia (yellow card) 77'; Mendes (yellow card) 86'	Stadium: Roazhon Park; Attendance: 24,818; Referee: Jérémie Pignard

29	Bordeaux	Cancelled	Rennes	Bordeaux
--:-- CEST (UTC+2)				Stadium: Matmut Atlantique; Attendance: 0

30	Rennes	Cancelled	Lyon	Rennes
--:-- CEST (UTC+2)				Stadium: Roazhon Park; Attendance: 0

31	Amiens	Cancelled	Rennes	Amiens
--:-- CEST (UTC+2)				Stadium: Stade de la Licorne; Attendance: 0

32	Saint-Étienne	Cancelled	Rennes	Saint-Étienne
--:-- CEST (UTC+2)				Stadium: Stade Geoffroy-Guichard; Attendance: 0

33	Rennes	Cancelled	Metz	Rennes
--:-- CEST (UTC+2)				Stadium: Roazhon Park

34	Rennes	Cancelled	Strasbourg	Rennes
--:-- CEST (UTC+2)				Stadium: Roazhon Park

35	Angers	Cancelled	Rennes	Angers
--:-- CEST (UTC+2)				Stadium: Stade Raymond Kopa

36	Rennes	Cancelled	Dijon	Rennes
--:-- CEST (UTC+2)				Stadium: Roazhon Park

37	Paris Saint-Germain	Cancelled	Rennes	Paris
--:-- CEST (UTC+2)				Stadium: Parc des Princes

38	Rennes	Cancelled	Monaco	Rennes
--:-- CEST (UTC+2)				Stadium: Roazhon Park

=== Coupe de France ===
4 January 2020 Round of 64	Rennes	0–0 (a.e.t.) (5–4 p)	Amiens	Rennes
18:00 CET (UTC+1)	Da Silva (yellow card) 90'	Report	Talal (yellow card) 60'	Stadium: Roazhon Park; Attendance: 13,525; Referee: Mikael Lesage
	Penalties
	Siebatcheu (penalty scored); Hunou (penalty scored); Gboho (penalty missed); Traoré (penalty missed); Del Castillo (penalty scored); Gnagnon (penalty scored); Silva (penalty scored)		(penalty scored) Chedjou; (penalty missed) Talal; (penalty scored) Ghoddos; (penalty scored) Aleesami; (penalty missed) Gnahoré; (penalty scored) Diabaté; (penalty missed) Dibassy

19 January 2020 Round of 32	Athlético Marseille	0–2	Rennes	Fos-sur-Mer
17:15 CET (UTC+1)	Nagui (yellow card) 35'; Bangre (yellow card) 59'	Report	Traoré 23'; Raphinha 45+2'	Stadium: Stade Parsemain; Attendance: 5,098; Referee: Amaury Delerue

28 January 2020 Round of 16	Angers	4–5 (a.e.t.)	Rennes	Angers
18:30 CET (UTC+1)	Petković (yellow card) 37'; Thioub 52', 85', (yellow card) 100'; Fulgini (yellow card) 60'; Bahoken 89' (pen.); Pereira Lage 105+1'	Report	Maouassa (yellow card) 32'; Léa Siliki 37'; Da Silva (yellow card) 39'; Niang 42', 61' (pen.); Del Castillo (yellow card) 66'; Grenier (yellow card) 72'; Gnagnon (yellow card) 88'; Gboho 101'; Gelin 110'	Stadium: Stade Raymond Kopa; Attendance: 9,821; Referee: Thomas Léonard

11 February 2020 Quarter-finals	ASM Belfort	0–3	Rennes	Montbéliard
20:55 CET (UTC+1)	Magassouba (yellow card) 45'; Tahiri (yellow card) 57'; Umbdenstock (yellow card) 77'; Grasso (yellow card) 82'	Report	Raphinha 23'; Niang (yellow card) 26', (goal) 71' (pen.); Léa Siliki (yellow card) 35'; Camavinga (yellow card) 83'; Siebatcheu 90+1'	Stadium: Stade Auguste Bonal; Attendance: 19,506; Referee: Amaury Delerue

5 March 2020 Semi-finals	Saint-Étienne	2–1	Rennes	Saint-Étienne
20:55 CET (UTC+1)	Kolodziejczak 43'; Camara (yellow card) 68'; Boudebouz 90+4'	Report	Camavinga (yellow card) 19'; Traoré (yellow card) 28'; Niang 33' (pen.); Del Castillo (yellow card) 56'	Stadium: Stade Geoffroy-Guichard; Attendance: 30,535; Referee: Antony Gautier

=== Coupe de la Ligue ===
18 December 2019 Round of 16	Amiens	3–2	Rennes	Amiens
21:05 CET (UTC+1)	Zungu 35', (yellow card) 38'; Mendoza 42'; Cornette (yellow card) 89'; Monconduit 90+1'	Report	Bourigeaud 27' (pen.); Hunou 73'; Raphinha (yellow card) 89'	Stadium: Stade de la Licorne; Attendance: 4,883; Referee: Stéphanie Frappart

=== Trophée des Champions ===
3 August 2019 Final	Paris Saint-Germain	2–1	Rennes	Shenzhen, China
19:30 UTC+8	Meunier (yellow card) 7'; Bernat (yellow card) 23'; Mbappé 57', (yellow card) 90+3'; Di María 73', (yellow card) 74'; Sarabia (yellow card) 90'	Report	Hunou 13'; Bourigeaud (yellow card) 45+2'; Léa Siliki (yellow card) 72'	Stadium: Shenzhen Universiade Sports Centre; Attendance: 22,045; Referee: Benoît Bastien

=== UEFA Europa League ===
==== Group stage ====
Pos	Team	Pld	W	D	L	GF	GA	GD	Pts	Qualification	CEL	CLJ	LAZ	REN
1	(Scotland) Celtic	6	4	1	1	10	6	+4	13	Advance to knockout phase	—	2–0	2–1	3–1
2	(Romania) CFR Cluj	6	4	0	2	6	4	+2	12	Advance to knockout phase	2–0	—	2–1	1–0
3	(Italy) Lazio	6	2	0	4	6	9	−3	6		1–2	1–0	—	2–1
4	(France) Rennes	6	1	1	4	5	8	−3	4		1–1	0–1	2–0	—

Source: UEFA
Rules for classification: Group stage tiebreakers

19 September 2019 1	Rennes (France)	1–1	(Scotland) Celtic	Rennes, France
18:55 CEST (UTC+2)	Traoré (yellow card) 35'; Niang 38' (pen.); Raphinha (yellow card) 60'	Report	Édouard (yellow card) 21'; Brown (yellow card) 23'; Christie 59' (pen.), (yellow card) 90+4'; Bayo (yellow card) 89' (yellow-red card) 90+2'	Stadium: Roazhon Park; Attendance: 27,026; Referee: José María Sánchez Martínez (Spain)

3 October 2019 2	Lazio (Italy)	2–1	(France) Rennes	Rome, Italy
21:00 CEST (UTC+2)	Cataldi (yellow card) 9'; Milinković-Savić 64'; Immobile 75'	Report	Gnagnon (yellow card) 41'; Morel 55'	Stadium: Stadio Olimpico; Attendance: 13,072; Referee: Serhiy Boyko (Ukraine)

24 October 2019 3	Rennes (France)	0–1	(Romania) CFR Cluj	Rennes, France
21:00 CEST (UTC+2)	Mendy (red card) 5'; Niang (yellow card) 9'; Raphinha (yellow card) 23'; Camavinga (red card) 46'; Maouassa (yellow card) 51'	Report	Deac 9'; Sušić (yellow card) 17' (yellow-red card) 82'; Arlauskis (yellow card) 90+1'	Stadium: Roazhon Park; Attendance: 27,330; Referee: Aleksei Eskov (Russia)

7 November 2019 4	CFR Cluj (Romania)	1–0	(France) Rennes	Cluj-Napoca, Romania
18:55 CET (UTC+1)	Traoré (yellow card) 30'; Rondón 87', (red card) 90'	Report	Gnagnon (yellow card) 16'; Gboho (yellow card) 84'; Grenier (yellow card) 90+2'; Siebatcheu (yellow card) 90+4'	Stadium: Stadionul Dr. Constantin Rădulescu; Attendance: 11,067; Referee: Tiago Martins (Portugal)

28 November 2019 5	Celtic (Scotland)	3–1	(France) Rennes	Glasgow, Scotland
21:00 CET (UTC+1)	Morgan 22'; Christie (yellow card) 36', (goal) 45+1'; Brown (yellow card) 55'; Johnston 74'; Taylor (yellow card) 83'	Report	Siebatcheu (yellow card) 10'; Nyamsi (yellow card) 61'; Bourigeaud (yellow card) 77'; Hunou 89'	Stadium: Celtic Park; Attendance: 56,172; Referee: Espen Eskås (Norway)

12 December 2019 6	Rennes (France)	2–0	(Italy) Lazio	Rennes, France
18:55 CET (UTC+1)	Gnagnon 31', 87'; Nyamsi (yellow card) 47'; Salin (yellow card) 58'	Report	Luis Alberto (yellow card) 58'; Jony (yellow card) 84'; Cataldi (yellow card) 89'	Stadium: Roazhon Park; Attendance: 25,082; Referee: Srđan Jovanović (Serbia)

== Statistics ==
=== Appearances and goals ===
No.	Pos	Nat	Player	Total		Ligue 1		Coupe de France		Coupe de la Ligue		Trophée des Champions		Europa League	
No.	Pos	Nat	Player	Apps	Goals	Apps	Goals	Apps	Goals	Apps	Goals	Apps	Goals	Apps	Goals
Goalkeepers
1	GK	(France) FRA	Romain Salin	7	0	4	0	0	0	1	0	0	0	2	0
16	GK	(Senegal) SEN	Édouard Mendy	33	0	24	0	5	0	0	0	0	0	4	0
30	GK	(Democratic Republic of the Congo) COD	Pépé Bonet	1	0	0	0	0	0	0	0	0	0	0+1	0
40	GK	(Democratic Republic of the Congo) COD	Riffi Mandanda	0	0	0	0	0	0	0	0	0	0	0	0
Defenders
3	DF	(France) FRA	Damien Da Silva	32	1	25	1	3	0	0	0	1	0	3	0
4	DF	(France) FRA	Gerzino Nyamsi	7	0	0+4	0	0	0	1	0	0	0	2	0
15	DF	(Madagascar) MAD	Jérémy Morel	27	2	20+1	1	2	0	1	0	0	0	3	1
21	DF	(France) FRA	Joris Gnagnon	32	2	14+5	0	3+2	0	1	0	1	0	6	2
26	DF	(France) FRA	Jérémy Gelin	18	1	10+4	0	3	1	0	0	1	0	0	0
27	DF	(Mali) MLI	Hamari Traoré	37	1	27	0	5	1	0+1	0	0	0	4	0
31	DF	(France) FRA	Sacha Boey	9	0	1+4	0	0	0	1	0	0+1	0	2	0
Midfielders
6	MF	(Sweden) SWE	Jakob Johansson	0	0	0	0	0	0	0	0	0	0	0	0
8	MF	(France) FRA	Clément Grenier	17	1	10+1	1	0+1	0	0	0	1	0	4	0
10	MF	(France) FRA	Rafik Guitane	4	0	0+2	0	0	0	0	0	0	0	1+1	0
12	MF	(France) FRA	James Léa Siliki	29	1	12+8	0	4+1	1	0	0	1	0	2+1	0
14	MF	(France) FRA	Benjamin Bourigeaud	36	3	21+4	2	3+1	0	1	1	1	0	4+1	0
17	MF	(France) FRA	Faitout Maouassa	32	3	23	3	4+1	0	0	0	1	0	3	0
18	MF	(Angola) ANG	Eduardo Camavinga	36	1	24+1	1	3+2	0	1	0	1	0	2+2	0
20	MF	(France) FRA	Flavien Tait	26	2	9+8	2	3	0	1	0	1	0	4	0
23	MF	(France) FRA	Adrien Hunou	34	11	13+10	8	2+3	0	1	1	1	1	2+2	1
25	MF	(France) FRA	Steven Nzonzi	7	0	4+1	0	2	0	0	0	0	0	0	0
28	MF	(France) FRA	Jonas Martin	5	0	1+2	0	0	0	0	0	0	0	2	0
34	MF	(France) FRA	Yann Gboho	17	2	2+6	1	1+3	1	1	0	0+1	0	1+2	0
Forwards
7	FW	(Brazil) BRA	Raphinha	30	7	20+2	5	3	2	0+1	0	0	0	3+1	0
9	FW	(France) FRA	Jordan Siebatcheu	21	1	4+10	0	0+2	1	0	0	0	0	2+3	0
11	FW	(Senegal) SEN	M'Baye Niang	36	14	24+2	10	4+1	4	0	0	0	0	4+1	0
19	FW	(Turkey) TUR	Metehan Güçlü	0	0	0	0	0	0	0	0	0	0	0	0
22	FW	(France) FRA	Romain Del Castillo	33	2	14+7	2	5	0	1	0	0+1	0	3+2	0
32	FW	(France) FRA	Lucas Da Cunha	5	0	1+1	0	0	0	0+1	0	0	0	1+1	0
Players transferred out during the season
40	GK	(Czech Republic) CZE	Tomáš Koubek	1	0	0	0	0	0	0	0	1	0	0	0
5	DF	(Ivory Coast) CIV	Souleyman Doumbia	3	0	1	0	0	0	0	0	0	0	2	0

Last updated: 8 March 2020
Source: Soccerway
