= 2019 Trophée des Champions =

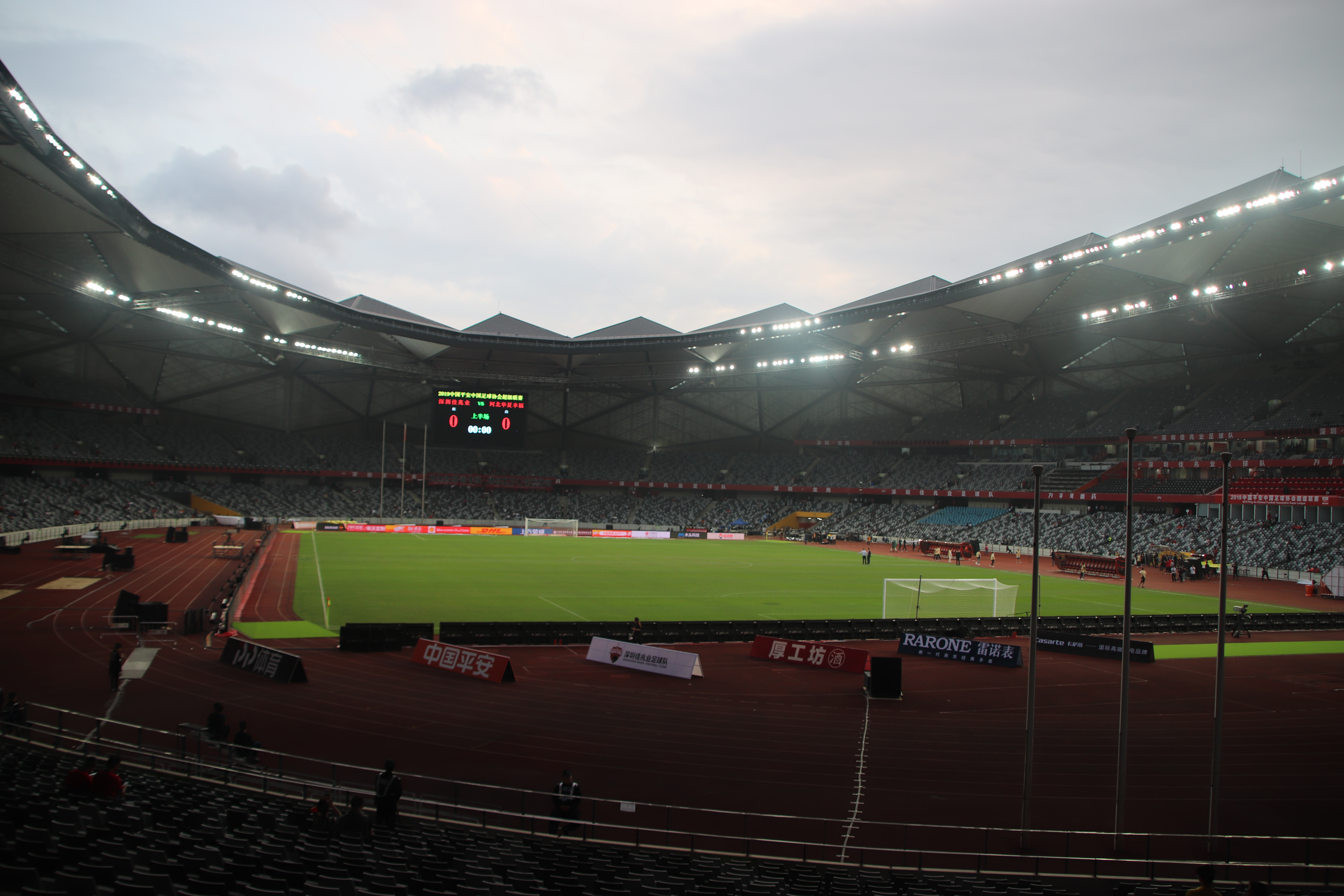
- The Shenzhen Universiade Sports Centre in Shenzhen hosted the match
- Event: Trophée des Champions
Paris Saint-Germain	Rennes
2	1
- Date: 3 August 2019
- Venue: Shenzhen Universiade Sports Centre, Shenzhen, China
- Man of the Match: Kylian Mbappé (Paris Saint-Germain)
- Referee: Benoît Bastien
- Attendance: 22,045

The 2019 Trophée des Champions (transl. 2019 Champions Trophy) was the 24th edition of the French super cup. The match was contested by the winners of the 2018–19 Ligue 1, Paris Saint-Germain and Coupe de France champions, Rennes. The match was played at the Shenzhen Universiade Sports Centre in Shenzhen, China.

Paris Saint-Germain were the six-time defending champions, having beat Monaco in the 2018 edition, and they won the match 2–1 for their seventh consecutive and ninth overall Trophée des Champions title.

== Match ==
=== Details ===
3 August 2019
19:30 CST

Paris Saint-Germain	2–1	Rennes
Mbappé 57'; Di María 73'	Report	Hunou 13'

Shenzhen Universiade Sports Centre, Shenzhen
Attendance: 22,045
Referee: Benoît Bastien

Paris Saint-Germain	Rennes

GK	16	(France) Alphonse Areola
RB	12	(Belgium) Thomas Meunier	(yellow card) 7'	(substituted off) 80'
CB	4	(Germany) Thilo Kehrer
CB	22	(France) Abdou Diallo
LB	14	(Spain) Juan Bernat	(yellow card) 23'
RM	21	(Spain) Ander Herrera		(substituted off) 61'
CM	5	(Brazil) Marquinhos (c)		(substituted off) 78'
LM	6	(Italy) Marco Verratti
RW	19	(Spain) Pablo Sarabia	(yellow card) 90'
CF	9	(Uruguay) Edinson Cavani
LW	7	(France) Kylian Mbappé	(yellow card) 90+3'
Substitutes:
GK	1	(Germany) Kevin Trapp
DF	2	(Brazil) Thiago Silva		(substituted on) 80'
DF	20	(France) Layvin Kurzawa
DF	31	(France) Colin Dagba
DF	37	(France) Arthur Zagre
MF	8	(Argentina) Leandro Paredes		(substituted on) 78'
FW	11	(Argentina) Ángel Di María	(yellow card) 74'	(substituted on) 61'
Manager:
(Germany) Thomas Tuchel

GK	40	(Czech Republic) Tomáš Koubek
RB	14	(France) Benjamin Bourigeaud	(yellow card) 45+2'	(substituted off) 68'
CB	26	(France) Jérémy Gelin
CB	3	(France) Damien Da Silva (c)
CB	21	(Madagascar) Jérémy Morel
LB	17	(France) Faitout Maouassa
RM	12	(France) James Léa Siliki	(yellow card) 72'	(substituted off) 84'
CM	8	(France) Clément Grenier
LM	18	(France) Eduardo Camavinga
CF	23	(France) Adrien Hunou		(substituted off) 46'
CF	20	(France) Flavien Tait
Substitutes:
GK	1	(France) Romain Salin
DF	4	(France) Gerzino Nyamsi
DF	31	(France) Sacha Boey		(substituted on) 46'
MF	6	(Sweden) Jakob Johansson
MF	22	(France) Romain Del Castillo		(substituted on) 84'
MF	34	(France) Yann Gboho		(substituted on) 68'
FW	32	(France) Lucas Da Cunha
Manager:
(France) Julien Stéphan

Man of the Match:
Kylian Mbappé (Paris Saint-Germain)

Assistant referees:
Frédéric Haquette
Hicham Zakrani
Fourth official:
Mikael Lesage

Match rules

- 90 minutes.
- Penalty shoot-out if scores level.
- Seven named substitutes, of which up to three may be used.

== See also ==
- 2019–20 Ligue 1
- 2019–20 Coupe de France
- 2019–20 Paris Saint-Germain FC season
- 2019–20 Stade Rennais FC season
