= Mandanda =

Mandanda is a Congolese surname especially bore by a French-Congolese professional football goalkeeper's siblings with :

- Steve Mandanda (born 1985), French national team and Olympique de Marseille (French Ligue 1) goalkeeper
- Parfait Mandanda (born 1989), Congolese national team and Hartford Athletic (USL Championship) goalkeeper
- Riffi Mandanda (born 1992), Stade Rennais (French Ligue 1) third goalkeeper
- Over Mandanda (born 1998), US Créteil-Lusitanos (French Championnat National 2) reserve team goalkeeper.
