= 2016–17 Stade Rennais FC season =

Rennes
2016–17 season
- Chairman: René Ruello
- Manager: Christian Gourcuff
- Stadium: Roazhon Park
- Ligue 1: 9th
- Coupe de France: Round of 32
- Coupe de la Ligue: Round of 16
Home colours	Away colours	Third colours

The 2016–17 Stade Rennais season is the 116th professional season of the club since its creation in 1901.

== Players ==
French teams are limited to four players without EU citizenship. Hence, the squad list includes only the principal nationality of each player; several non-European players on the squad have dual citizenship with an EU country. Also, players from the ACP countries—countries in Africa, the Caribbean, and the Pacific that are signatories to the Cotonou Agreement—are not counted against non-EU quotas due to the Kolpak ruling.

=== Current squad ===
As of 2 February 2017.

Note: Flags indicate national team as defined under FIFA eligibility rules; some limited exceptions apply. Players may hold more than one non-FIFA nationality.

No.	Pos.	Nation	Player
1	GK	FRA	Benoît Costil
2	DF	ALG	Mehdi Zeffane
4	DF	MOZ	Mexer
5	DF	POR	Pedro Mendes (captain)
6	MF	SUI	Gélson Fernandes
7	FW	COD	Ndombe Mubele
8	MF	FRA	Clément Chantôme
11	FW	FRA	Wesley Saïd
13	FW	CIV	Giovanni Sio
14	FW	FRA	Aldo Kalulu (on loan from Lyon)
15	DF	ALG	Ramy Bensebaini
16	GK	ALG	Raïs M'Bolhi
17	DF	ALB	Ermir Lenjani
18	MF	FRA	Morgan Amalfitano
19	DF	FRA	Dimitri Cavaré

No.	Pos.	Nation	Player
21	MF	FRA	Benjamin André
22	DF	FRA	Sylvain Armand
23	MF	FRA	Adrien Hunou
24	DF	GUF	Ludovic Baal
25	DF	POR	Afonso Figueiredo
26	MF	BIH	Sanjin Prcić
28	MF	FRA	Yoann Gourcuff
29	DF	FRA	Romain Danzé
30	GK	LTU	Edvinas Gertmonas
31	FW	FRA	Adama Diakhaby
32	DF	CIV	Joris Gnagnon
33	MF	FRA	James Lea Siliki
34	MF	FRA	Denis-Will Poha
35	MF	FRA	Nicolas Janvier

=== Out on loan ===
Note: Flags indicate national team as defined under FIFA eligibility rules; some limited exceptions apply. Players may hold more than one non-FIFA nationality.

No.	Pos.	Nation	Player
—	GK	SEN	Abdoulaye Diallo (on loan to Çaykur Rizespor)
—	DF	FRA	Séga Coulibaly (on loan to Sedan)
—	MF	FRA	Sébastien Salles-Lamonge (on loan to Le Havre)

No.	Pos.	Nation	Player
—	MF	MLI	Yacouba Sylla (on loan to Montpellier)
—	FW	RSA	Kermit Erasmus (on loan to Lens)
—	FW	FRA	Anthony Ribelin (on loan to Paris FC)

== Transfers ==
=== Summer ===
In:

No.	Pos.	Nation	Player
8	MF	FRA	Clément Chantôme (from (France) Bordeaux)
16	GK	FRA	Paul Nardi (on loan from Monaco)
25	DF	POR	Afonso Figueiredo (from (Portugal) Boavista)
27	MF	FRA	Anthony Ribelin (from (France) Montpeller)
—	FW	AUT	Philipp Hosiner (loan return from (Germany) Köln)

Out:

No.	Pos.	Nation	Player
3	DF	SEN	Cheikh M'Bengue (to (France) Saint-Étienne)
14	DF	SEN	Fallou Diagne (to (Germany) Werder Bremen)
17	MF	FRA	Jérémie Boga (loan return to (England) Chelsea, later loaned to (Spain) Granada)
23	FW	FRA	Ousmane Dembélé (to (Germany) Borussia Dortmund)
—	DF	MKD	Gjoko Zajkov (to (Belgium) Charleroi, previously on loan)
—	FW	AUT	Philipp Hosiner (to (Germany) Union Berlin)

=== Winter ===
In:

No.	Pos.	Nation	Player
14	FW	FRA	Aldo Kalulu (on loan from (France) Lyon)
16	GK	ALG	Raïs M'Bolhi (from (Turkey) Antalyaspor)
18	MF	FRA	Morgan Amalfitano (from (France) Lille)

Out:

No.	Pos.	Nation	Player
7	MF	FRA	Paul-Georges Ntep (to (Germany) Wolfsburg)
—	GK	FRA	Paul Nardi (loan return to (France) Monaco, later loaned to (Belgium) Cercle Brugge)
—	FW	POL	Kamil Grosicki (to (England) Hull City)

== Competitions ==
=== Ligue 1 ===
==== League table ====
Pos	Team	Pld	W	D	L	GF	GA	GD	Pts
7	Nantes	38	14	9	15	40	54	−14	51
8	Saint-Étienne	38	12	14	12	41	42	−1	50
9	Rennes	38	12	14	12	36	42	−6	50
10	Guingamp	38	14	8	16	46	53	−7	50
11	Lille	38	13	7	18	40	47	−7	46

Source: Ligue 1, Soccerway
Rules for classification: 1) Points; 2) Goal difference; 3) Goals scored; 4) Head-to-head goal difference; 5) Fairplay ranking.

==== Results summary ====
Overall								Home						Away					
Pld	W	D	L	GF	GA	GD	Pts	W	D	L	GF	GA	GD	W	D	L	GF	GA	GD
38	12	14	12	36	42	−6	50	10	6	3	26	15	+11	2	8	9	10	27	−17

Last updated: 20 May 2017.

==== Results by round ====
Round	1	2	3	4	5	6	7	8	9	10	11	12	13	14	15	16	17	18	19	20	21	22	23	24	25	26	27	28	29	30	31	32	33	34	35	36	37	38
Ground	A	H	A	H	A	H	A	H	H	A	H	A	H	H	A	H	A	H	A	H	A	H	A	A	H	A	H	A	H	A	H	A	H	A	A	H	A	H
Result	L	W	D	W	L	W	L	W	D	W	W	L	D	W	L	W	L	L	D	L	D	D	D	D	D	L	W	D	D	D	D	L	W	D	L	W	W	L
Position	17	9	12	6	10	8	11	7	7	6	5	5	6	4	6	4	5	7	7	7	8	9	9	8	10	10	8	8	9	8	11	11	9	9	9	10	9	9

A = Away; H = Home; W = Win; D = Draw; L = Loss

==== Matches ====
14 August 2016 1	Nice	1–0	Rennes	Nice
17:00 CET	Sarr 60'	Report	Mendes (yellow card) 32'	Stadium: Allianz Riviera; Attendance: 19,075; Referee: Antony Gautier

20 August 2016 2	Rennes	2–0	Nancy	Rennes
20:00 CET	Gourcuff 23'; Sio (yellow card) 40', (goal) 81'; André (yellow card) 58'; Pedro Henrique (yellow card) 62'; Fernandes (yellow card) 67'	Report	Muratori (yellow card) 21'; Cétout (yellow card) 28'	Stadium: Roazhon Park; Attendance: 20,703; Referee: Mikael Lesage

27 August 2016 3	Montpellier	1–1	Rennes	Montpellier
20:00 CET	Congré 22'; Vanden Borre (yellow card) 38'	Report	Saïd (yellow card) 41'; Mendes (yellow card) 59'; Diakhaby 64'	Stadium: Stade de la Mosson; Attendance: 9,163; Referee: Benoît Millot

11 September 2016 4	Rennes	2–0	Caen	Rennes
17:00 CET	Fernandes (yellow card) 23'; Saïd 47'; Gourcuff (yellow card) 59'; Prcić 90+3'	Report	Genevois (yellow card) 84'	Stadium: Roazhon Park; Attendance: 20,584; Referee: Amaury Delerue

17 September 2016 5	Monaco	3–0	Rennes	Monaco
17:00 CET	Falcao 42'; Traoré (yellow card) 52'; Lemar 90', 90+2'	Report	Sio (yellow card) 52'	Stadium: Stade Louis II; Attendance: 4,000; Referee: Frank Schneider

21 September 2016 6	Rennes	3–2	Marseille	Rennes
21:00 CEST (UTC+02:00)	Fernandes (yellow card) 26'; Sio 41'; Grosicki 86' (pen.); Hunou 89'	Report	Gomis 44' (pen.), 50'; Machach (yellow card) 56' (yellow-red card) 65'; Cabella (yellow card) 90+2'	Stadium: Roazhon Park; Attendance: 21,583; Referee: Ruddy Buquet

24 September 2016 7	Dijon	3–0	Rennes	Dijon
20:00 CEST (UTC+02:00)	Diony 7', 78'; Varrault (yellow card) 13'; Marié 19'	Report	Prcić (yellow card) 34'	Stadium: Stade Gaston Gérard; Attendance: 8,148; Referee: Sébastien Moreira

30 September 2016 8	Rennes	1–0	Guingamp	Rennes
20:45 CEST (UTC+01:00)	Diakhaby 90+2'	Report		Stadium: Roazhon Park; Attendance: 26,118; Referee: Nicolas Rainville

16 October 2016 9	Rennes	1–1	Bordeaux	Rennes
15:00 CET (UTC+1)	Contento 4' (o.g.); André (yellow card) 81'	Report	Pallois (yellow card) 45', (goal) 66'; Ounas (yellow card) 45'	Stadium: Roazhon Park; Attendance: 22,962; Referee: Benoît Millot

22 October 2016 10	Nantes	1–2	Rennes	Nantes
20:00 CEST (UTC+02:00)	Thomasson (yellow card) 28'; Sala 42'	Report	Ntep (yellow card) 16'; Grosicki 58', 75'; Hunou (yellow card) 81'; André (yellow card) 90+1'	Stadium: Stade de la Beaujoire; Attendance: 29,015; Referee: Johan Hamel

29 October 2016 11	Rennes	1–0	Metz	Rennes
17:00 CEST	Saïd 56'	Report		Stadium: Roazhon Park; Attendance: 20,874; Referee: Saïd Ennjimi

6 November 2016 12	Paris Saint-Germain	4–0	Rennes	Paris
20:45 CET (UTC+1)	Fernandes 31' (o.g.); Cavani 43'; Marquinhos (yellow card) 61'; Rabiot 67'; Verratti 79'	Report	Mendes (yellow card) 48'; Pedro Henrique (yellow card) 51'	Stadium: Parc des Princes; Attendance: 42,002; Referee: Amaury Delerue

29 October 2016 13	Rennes	1–1	Angers	Rennes
20:00 CEST (UTC+01:00)	Sio 22'; Gourcuff (yellow card) 69'; Mendes (yellow card) 74'	Report	Andreu (yellow card) 35'; Manceau (yellow card) 56'; Thomas (red card) 58'; Pépé 82'; N'Doye (red card) 90+2'	Stadium: Roazhon Park; Attendance: 23,142; Referee: Mikael Lesage

25 November 2016 14	Rennes	1–0	Toulouse	Rennes
20:45 CET (UTC+01:00)	Gourcuff 1'; Andre (yellow card) 38'; Pedro Henrique 90+1'; Mendes 90+3'	Report	Yago (yellow card) 39'; Ninkov (yellow card) 63'; Jullien (red card) 90+1'; Toivonen (yellow card) 90+3'	Stadium: Roazhon Park; Attendance: 17,016; Referee: Fredy Fautrel

29 November 2016 15	Lorient	2–1	Rennes	Lorient
19:00	Mvuemba (yellow card) 21'; Ciani 28'; Waris 46'	Report	Sio 32'; Baal (yellow card) 89'	Stadium: Stade du Moustoir; Attendance: 10,082; Referee: Stéphane Lannoy

4 December 2016 16	Rennes	2–0	Saint-Étienne	Rennes
15:00 CET (UTC+1)	Fernandes (yellow card) 51'; Ntep 54'; André (yellow card) 65'; Sio (yellow card) 73'; Grosicki 90'	Report	Veretout (yellow card) 57'; Selnæs (yellow card) 83'	Stadium: Roazhon Park; Attendance: 19,618; Referee: Amaury Delerue

11 December 2016 17	Lyon	1–0	Rennes	Décines-Charpieu
15:00 CEST (UTC+2)	Valbuena 28'; Rafael (yellow card) 43'; Yanga-Mbiwa (yellow card) 52'; Darder (yellow card) 90+3'	Report	Bensebaini (red card) 74'	Stadium: Parc Olympique Lyonnais; Attendance: 33,901; Referee: Benoît Millot

17 December 2016 18	Rennes	1–2	Bastia	Rennes
20:00 CET (UTC+1)	Fernandes (yellow card) 45'; Sio 71'	Report	Crivelli 59'; Danic 63'	Stadium: Roazhon Park; Attendance: 22,637; Referee: Clément Turpin

21 December 2016 19	Lille	1–1	Rennes	Villeneuve d'Ascq
20:45 CET (UTC+1)	De Préville 71'	Report	Hamouma 17'; Dabo (yellow card) 32'; Polomat (yellow card) 44'; Veretout (yellow card) 65'	Stadium: Stade Pierre-Mauroy; Attendance: 36,879; Referee: Mikaël Lesage

14 January 2017 20	Rennes	0–1	Paris Saint-Germain	Rennes
17:00 CET (UTC+1)		Report	Verratti (yellow card) 29'; Draxler 39'; Motta (yellow card) 62'	Stadium: Roazhon Park; Attendance: 29,054; Referee: Benoît Bastien

21 January 2017 21	Guingamp	1–1	Rennes	Guingamp
20:00 CET (UTC+01:00)	Diallo (yellow card) 8', (goal) 39'; Fernando Marçal (yellow card) 58'	Report	Prcić (yellow card) 4' (yellow-red card); Kalulu (yellow card) 14'; Gourcuff 46'; Mexer (yellow card) 66'	Stadium: Stade de Roudourou; Attendance: 16,028; Referee: Tony Chapron

28 January 2017 22	Rennes	1–1	Nantes	Rennes
20:00 CET (UTC+1)	Gnagnon 87'	Report	Iloki 45'	Stadium: Roazhon Park; Attendance: 23,664; Referee: Mikael Lesage

4 February 2017 23	Bordeaux	1–1	Rennes	Bordeaux
20:00 CET (UTC+1)	Ménez 56'; Pallois (yellow card) 80'	Report	Baal (yellow card) 27'; Gourcuff 69'	Stadium: Nouveau Stade de Bordeaux; Attendance: 16,588; Referee: Sébastien Desiage

8 February 2017 24	Angers	0–0	Rennes	Angers
19:00 CEST (UTC+2)	Diédhiou (yellow card) 39'; Thomas (yellow card) 78'	Report	André (yellow card) 52'; Baal (red card) 85'	Stadium: Stade Raymond Kopa; Attendance: 10,897; Referee: Clément Turpin

12 February 2017 25	Rennes	2–2	Nice	Rennes
15:00 CET (UTC+1)	Amalfitano 7'; Sio 21'; Mendes (yellow card) 90'	Report	Donis 59'; Eysseric 81'; Belhanda (yellow card) 83'; Baysse (yellow card) 90'	Stadium: Roazhon Park; Attendance: 25,665; Referee: Johan Hamel

18 February 2017 26	Marseille	2–0	Rennes	Marseille
20:45 CEST (UTC+2)	N'Jie 59'; Vainqueur (yellow card) 61'; Thauvin 64'	Report		Stadium: Stade Vélodrome; Attendance: 45,395; Referee: Mikael Lesage

25 February 2017 27	Rennes	1–0	Lorient	Rennes
20:00 CET (UTC+1)	Sio 19'	Report	Touré (yellow card) 2'; Peybernes (yellow card) 80'; Waris (yellow card) 90+3'	Stadium: Roazhon Park; Attendance: 25,791; Referee: Nicolas Rainville

4 March 2017 28	Metz	1–1	Rennes	Metz
19:00 CET (UTC+1)	Diabaté (yellow card) 18', (goal) 45+1'; Falette (yellow card) 62'; Balliu (yellow card) 76'	Report	Gnagnon (yellow card) 11'; Gourcuff (yellow card) 34'; Sio (yellow card) 56'; Saïd 90'	Stadium: Stade Saint-Symphorien; Attendance: 16,151; Referee: Benoît Millot

11 March 2017 29	Rennes	1–1	Dijon	Rennes
20:00 CET (UTC+1)	Bensebaini (yellow card) 41'; Saïd 58'; Danzé (yellow card) 85'	Report	Chafik (yellow card) 3'; Tavares 42'	Stadium: Roazhon Park; Attendance: 19,067; Referee: Olivier Thual

18 March 2017 30	Toulouse	0–0	Rennes	Toulouse
20:00 CET (UTC+01:00)	Blin (yellow card) 56' (red card) 62'; Sylla (yellow card) 86'	Report	Bensebaini (yellow card) 45'; Sio (yellow card) 78'	Stadium: Stadium Municipal; Attendance: 15,635; Referee: Sébastien Desiage

2 April 2017 31	Rennes	1–1	Lyon	Rennes
15:00 CEST (UTC+2)	Bensebaini (red card) 5'; Danzé (yellow card) 60'; Mubele 82'	Report	Lacazette (penalty missed) 5'; Cornet 53'; Yanga-Mbiwa (yellow card) 90+2'	Stadium: Roazhon Park; Attendance: 23,673; Referee: Antony Gautier

8 April 2017 32	Nancy	3–0	Rennes	Tomblaine
20:00 CET (UTC+1)	Muratori (yellow card) 1'; Dalé 11'; Cuffaut (yellow card) 33'; Dia 51', 65'	Report	Diakhaby (yellow card) 67'	Stadium: Stade Marcel Picot; Attendance: 18,009; Referee: Jérôme Brisard

15 April 2017 33	Rennes	2–0	Lille	Rennes
20:00 CEST (UTC+02:00)	Mubele 3'; Sio 29'; Chantôme (yellow card) 84'	Report	Béria (yellow card) 55'; Bissouma (yellow card) 76'	Stadium: Roazhon Park; Attendance: 24,056; Referee: Karim Abed

23 April 2017 34	Saint-Étienne	1–1	Rennes	Saint-Étienne
17:00 CEST (UTC+2)	Berić 40'; Malcuit (yellow card) 85'	Report	Bensebaini (yellow card) 9'; Prcić (yellow card) 16'; Mexer (yellow card) 23', (goal) 45'	Stadium: Stade Geoffroy-Guichard; Attendance: 0 Referee: Ruddy Buquet

29 April 2017 35	Bastia	1–0	Rennes	Fos-sur-Mer
20:00 CEST (UTC+2)	Cahuzac (yellow card) 64'; Crivelli 68'	Report	Bensebaini (yellow card) 71'	Stadium: Stade Parsemain; Attendance: 0 Referee: Jérôme Miguelgorry

7 May 2017 36	Rennes	1–0	Montpellier	Rennes
15:00 CEST (UTC+02:00)	Mendes (yellow card) 42'; Baal (yellow card) 72'; Mubele 80'; Fernandes (yellow card) 83'	Report	Congré (yellow card) 26'; Boudebouz (yellow card) 83'	Stadium: Roazhon Park; Attendance: 18,308; Referee: Sébastien Desiage

14 May 2017 37	Caen	0–1	Rennes	Caen
21:00 CEST (UTC+02:00)	Da Silva (yellow card) 66'; Diomande (yellow card) 87'	Report	Sio (yellow card) 43', (goal) 68'	Stadium: Stade Michel d'Ornano; Attendance: 16,273; Referee: Benoît Millot

20 May 2017 38	Rennes	2–3	Monaco	Rennes
21:00 CEST (UTC+2)	Diakhaby 69', 90+1' (pen.)	Report	Fabinho 42'; Jemerson 48'; Jorge 78'	Stadium: Roazhon Park; Attendance: 26,565; Referee: Saïd Ennjimi

=== Coupe de France ===
8 January 2017 Round of 64	JA Biarritz	0–6	Rennes	Biarritz
17:00 CET	Merlou (yellow card) 70'; Ugartemendia (yellow card) 82'	Report	Ugartemendia 29' (o.g.); Saïd 31'; Diakhaby 33'; Gnagnon 39'; Habibou 67'; Mexer 74'; Prcić (yellow card) 86'	Stadium: Parc des Sports Aguiléra; Attendance: 8,442; Referee: Johan Hamel

1 February 2017 Round of 32	Rennes	0–4	Paris Saint-Germain	Rennes
21:00 CET	Cavaré (yellow card) 23'; Mendes (yellow card) 74'	Report	Draxler 27', 68'; Lucas 38'; Ben Arfa (yellow card) 50', (goal) 90'	Stadium: Roazhon Park; Attendance: 21,524; Referee: Jérôme Miguelgorry

=== Coupe de la Ligue ===
26 October 2016 Third round	Rennes	3–2	Lorient	Rennes
21:05 CET	Pedro Henrique 16', 90+5', (yellow card) 90+6'; Saïd 59'; Prcić (yellow card) 61'; Armand (yellow card) 86'	Report	Ben Khémis (yellow card) 45+2'; Mazikou (yellow card) 65'; Waris 87' (pen.); Lautoa 90+3'	Stadium: Roazhon Park; Attendance: 26,954; Referee: Clément Turpin

14 December 2016 Round of 16	Monaco	7–0	Rennes	Monaco
21:05 CET	Mbappé 11', 21', 62'; Boschilia 35', 79'; Jean 83'; Cavaré 84' (o.g.)	Report		Stadium: Stade Louis II; Attendance: 5,539; Referee: Frank Schneider
