= 2017–18 Stade Rennais FC season =

Rennes
2017–18 season
- Chairman: René Ruello (until 3 Nov 2017); Olivier Létang (from 3 Nov 2017)
- Manager: Christian Gourcuff (until 7 Nov 2017); Sabri Lamouchi (from 8 Nov 2017)
- Stadium: Roazhon Park
- Ligue 1: 5th
- Coupe de France: Round of 64 vs. PSG
- Coupe de la Ligue: Semi-finals vs. PSG
- Top goalscorer: League: Benjamin Bourigeaud (10); All: Benjamin Bourigeaud (12)
Home colours	Away colours	Third colours

The 2017–18 Stade Rennais season was the 116th professional season of the club since its creation in 1901. During this campaign the club competed in the following competitions: Ligue 1, Coupe de France, Coupe de la Ligue. Rennes had one of their best seasons in recent memory, finishing 5th and qualifying for the 2018-19 Europa League, the club's first European appearance since reaching the qualifying rounds of the 2008-09 UEFA Cup.

== Players ==
Note: Flags indicate national team as defined under FIFA eligibility rules; some limited exceptions apply. Players may hold more than one non-FIFA nationality.

No.	Pos.	Nation	Player
1	GK	SEN	Abdoulaye Diallo
2	DF	ALG	Mehdi Zeffane
3	DF	FRA	Damien Da Silva
4	DF	MOZ	Mexer
7	FW	SEN	Ismaïla Sarr
8	MF	FRA	Clément Grenier
9	FW	FRA	Theoson Siebatcheu
12	MF	FRA	James Lea Siliki
14	MF	FRA	Benjamin Bourigeaud
15	DF	ALG	Ramy Bensebaini
17	MF	FRA	Faitout Maouassa
21	MF	FRA	Benjamin André (captain)
22	MF	FRA	Sabri Toufiqui
23	MF	FRA	Adrien Hunou
24	DF	GUF	Ludovic Baal

No.	Pos.	Nation	Player
25	FW	SEN	Diafra Sakho
26	DF	FRA	Jérémy Gelin
27	DF	MLI	Hamari Traoré
28	MF	FRA	Denis-Will Poha
29	DF	FRA	Romain Danzé
30	GK	LTU	Edvinas Gertmonas
35	MF	FRA	Nicolas Janvier
36	DF	FRA	Namakoro Diallo
40	GK	CZE	Tomáš Koubek
-	MF	FRA	Clément Chantôme
-	MF	FRA	Romain Del Castillo
-	MF	FRA	Rafik Guitane
-	MF	FRA	Anthony Ribelin

== Competitions ==
=== Ligue 1 ===
==== League table ====
Pos	Team	Pld	W	D	L	GF	GA	GD	Pts	Qualification or relegation
3	Lyon	38	23	9	6	87	43	+44	78	Qualification for the Champions League group stage
4	Marseille	38	22	11	5	80	47	+33	77	Qualification for the Europa League group stage (Note: Since the winners of the 2017–18 Coupe de France and the 2017–18 Coupe de la Ligue, Paris Saint-Germain, qualified for European competition based on league position, the spot awarded to the Coupe de France winners (Europa League group stage) was passed to the fourth-placed team and the spot awarded to the Coupe de la Ligue winners (Europa League third qualifying round) was passed to the sixth-placed team. The fifth-placed team received the spot in Europa League third qualifying round originally designated to the fourth-placed team.)
5	Rennes	38	16	10	12	50	44	+6	58	Qualification for the Europa League group stage
6	Bordeaux	38	16	7	15	53	48	+5	55	Qualification for the Europa League second qualifying round
7	Saint-Étienne	38	15	10	13	47	50	−3	55	

Source: Ligue 1 and Soccerway
Rules for classification: 1) Points; 2) Goal difference; 3) Head-to-head points; 4) Head-to-head goal difference; 5) Head-to-head goals scored; 6) Head-to-head away goals; 7) Goals scored; 8) Away goals scored; 9) Most goals scored in one league match; 10) Fair-play points

==== Results summary ====
Overall								Home						Away					
Pld	W	D	L	GF	GA	GD	Pts	W	D	L	GF	GA	GD	W	D	L	GF	GA	GD
38	16	10	12	50	44	+6	58	8	4	7	21	22	−1	8	6	5	29	22	+7

Last updated: 19 May 2018.

==== Results by round ====
Round	1	2	3	4	5	6	7	8	9	10	11	12	13	14	15	16	17	18	19	20	21	22	23	24	25	26	27	28	29	30	31	32	33	34	35	36	37	38
Ground	A	H	H	A	A	H	A	H	A	H	A	H	A	H	A	H	A	H	A	H	A	H	A	H	A	A	H	A	H	A	H	A	H	A	H	H	A	H
Result	D	L	D	L	W	L	D	L	L	W	W	W	L	W	W	W	D	L	L	L	W	W	L	L	W	D	W	W	D	W	D	D	L	D	W	W	W	D
Position	11	14	17	19	14	15	15	16	16	16	14	10	11	9	8	6	6	7	9	10	9	8	8	10	8	7	7	5	6	5	5	5	5	7	6	5	5	5

A = Away; H = Home; W = Win; D = Draw; L = Loss

==== Matches ====
5 August 2017 1	Troyes	1–1	Rennes	Troyes
20:00 CEST (UTC+02:00)	Grandsir 46'; Obiang (yellow card) 53'	Report	Tell 69'	Stadium: Stade de l'Aube; Attendance: 9,968; Referee: Karim Abed

11 August 2017 2	Rennes	1–2	Lyon	Rennes
20:45 CEST (UTC+02:00)	Bensebaini (yellow card) 15'; Bourigeaud 86'	Report	Marçal (yellow card) 9'; Depay 57'; Tousart (yellow card) 68'; Mariano 74'; Darder (yellow card) 84'	Stadium: Roazhon Park; Attendance: 24,944; Referee: Benoît Millot

19 August 2017 3	Rennes	2–2	Dijon	Rennes
20:00 CEST (UTC+02:00)	Mubele 14', 46'; Benjamin André (yellow card) 69'	Report	Yamberé (yellow card) 32'; Kwon 50'; Chafik (yellow card) 66'; Tavares (yellow card) 87', (goal) 90+2' (pen.); Haddadi (yellow card) 90+3'	Stadium: Roazhon Park; Attendance: 16,888; Referee: Thomas Léonard

26 August 2017 4	Toulouse	3–2	Rennes	Toulouse
20:00 CEST (UTC+02:00)	Diop (yellow card) 8', (goal) 58'; Durmaz 35' (pen.), 71' (pen.), (yellow card) 43'; Cahuzac (yellow card) 36'; Delort (yellow card) 52'	Report	Mubele 7'; Amalfitano (yellow card) 25' (yellow-red card) 70'; Mubele (yellow card) 26'; Bourigeaud (yellow card) 41'; Sarr 65'; Bensebaini (yellow card) 87'	Stadium: Stadium Municipal; Attendance: 10,626; Referee: Frank Schneider

10 September 2017 5	Marseille	1–3	Rennes	Marseille
21:00 CEST (UTC+02:00)	Sanson (yellow card) 15', (goal) 87'; Évra (yellow card) 27'; Rami (yellow card) 29'; Abdennour (yellow card) 61'; Sertic (yellow card) 88'; Rolando (yellow card) 90'	Report	Khazri 2'; Bourigeaud 10'; Gnagnon 70'; André (yellow card) 84'	Stadium: Stade Vélodrome; Attendance: 40,343; Referee: Antony Gautier

17 September 2017 6	Rennes	0–1	Nice	Rennes
17:00 CEST (UTC+02:00)	Prcić (yellow card) 35'	Report	Saint-Maximin (yellow card) 45+2'; Jallet (yellow card) 49'; Seri (yellow card) 69'; Balotelli 79'; Lees-Melou (yellow card) 85'; (yellow card) 90+3' Arnaud Souquet	Stadium: Roazhon Park; Attendance: 24,892; Referee: Nicolas Rainville

24 September 2017 7	Saint-Étienne	2–2	Rennes	Saint-Étienne
15:00 CEST (UTC+02:00)	Dioussé (yellow card) 3'; Théophile-Catherine (yellow card) 31'; Janko (yellow card) 34'; Gabriel Silva 45+2', (red card) 90+4'; Bamba 70' (pen.)	Report	Benjamin Bourigeaud 41'; Khazri 54' (pen.); Amalfitano (yellow card) 59'; André (yellow card) 69'; H. Traoré (yellow card) 75'	Stadium: Stade Geoffroy-Guichard; Attendance: 31,043; Referee: Jérôme Miguelgorry

30 September 2017 8	Rennes	0–1	Caen	Rennes
20:00 CEST (UTC+02:00)	Bensebaini (yellow card) 1'; H. Traoré (yellow card) 24'; Khazri (yellow card) 45+1'; Bourigeaud (yellow card) 75'	Report	Santini (yellow card) 21'; Bensebaini 34' (o.g.)	Stadium: Roazhon Park; Attendance: 18,689; Referee: Amaury Delerue

14 October 2017 9	Guingamp	2–0	Rennes	Guingamp
20:00 CEST (UTC+02:00)	Diallo (yellow card) 17', (goal) 57'; Benezet (yellow card) 38'; Briand 89'; Didot (yellow card) 90+2'	Report	H. Traoré (yellow card) 5'; Léa Siliki (yellow card) 45+2'; Danzé (yellow card) 62'; Khazri (yellow card) 66' (yellow-red card) 66'; Figueiredo (yellow card) 89'	Stadium: Stade de Roudourou; Attendance: 15,902; Referee: Frank Schneider

21 October 2017 10	Rennes	1–0	Lille	Rennes
20:00 CEST (UTC+02:00)	Bourigeaud 6'; Bensebaini (yellow card) 78'	Report	Mendes (yellow card) 20'; Ballo-Touré (yellow card) 38'; Mendyl (red card) 85'	Stadium: Roazhon Park; Attendance: 21,852; Referee: Olivier Thual

28 October 2017 11	Montpellier	0–1	Rennes	Montpellier
20:00 CEST (UTC+02:00)	Aguilar (yellow card) 4'; Skhiri (yellow card) 55'; Mbenza (yellow card) 61'; Congré (yellow card) 90+6'	Report	Brandon 59'; Maouassa (yellow card) 25'; Bourigeaud (yellow card) 66'	Stadium: Stade de la Mosson; Attendance: 11,788; Referee: Benoît Bastien

3 November 2017 12	Rennes	1–0	Bordeaux	Rennes
20:45 CET (UTC+1)	André (yellow card) 43'; Khazri (yellow card) 80'; Toulalan 12' (o.g.)	Report	Otávio (yellow card) 41'; Kamano (yellow card) 47' de Préville (yellow card) 68'; Jovanović (yellow card) 70'; Sankharé (yellow card) 90'	Stadium: Roazhon Park; Attendance: 24,547; Referee: Ruddy Buquet

18 November 2017 13	Strasbourg	2–1	Rennes	Strasbourg
20:00 CET (UTC+1)	Blayac 28'; Bahoken (yellow card) 61', (goal) 82'	Report	Amalfitano (red card) 63'; Hunou 88'	Stadium: Stade de la Meinau; Attendance: 22,707; Referee: Tony Chapron

25 November 2017 14	Rennes	2–1	Nantes	Rennes
17:00 CET (UTC+1)	H. Traoré (yellow card) 3'; Léa Siliki (yellow card) 67'; Khazri 51', 88', (yellow card) 90+4'	Report	Nakoulma (yellow card) 31'; Dubois (yellow card) 40'; Pallois (yellow card) 51' (yellow-red card) 57'; Carlos (yellow card) 59'; Sala 73' (pen.); Thomasson (yellow card) 82'	Stadium: Roazhon Park; Attendance: 26,151; Referee: Ruddy Buquet

29 November 2017 15	Angers	1–2	Rennes	Angers
19:00 CET (UTC+1)	Toko Ekambi 37'	Report	H. Traoré (yellow card) 43'; Hunou 51'; André 84'	Stadium: Stade Raymond Kopa; Attendance: 10,364; Referee: Nicolas Rainville

2 December 2017 16	Rennes	2–0	Amiens	Rennes
20:00 CET (UTC+1)	Léa Siliki (yellow card) 59'; Khazri 72'; André 84'	Report	Monconduit (yellow card) 27'; Zungu (yellow card) 40'; Cissokho (yellow card) 50'; Manzala (yellow card) 52'; Avelar (yellow card) 56'	Stadium: Roazhon Park; Attendance: 23,051; Referee: Thomas Léonard

9 December 2017 17	Metz	1–1	Rennes	Metz
20:00 CET (UTC+1)	Diagne (yellow card) 5'; Philipps (yellow card) 34'; Mollet 41'; Niane (yellow card) 73'	Report	Hunou (yellow card) 16'; Léa Siliki (yellow card) 28'; Gnagnon (yellow card) 56'; Mubele 87'	Stadium: Stade Saint-Symphorien; Attendance: 11,239; Referee: Karim Abed

16 December 2017 18	Rennes	1–4	Paris Saint-Germain	Rennes
17:00 CET (UTC+1)	H. Traoré (yellow card) 32'; Mubele 53'; André (yellow card) 54' (yellow-red card) 63'; Khazri (yellow card) 78'	Report	Neymar 4', 76'; Mbappé 17'; Kimpembe (yellow card) 42' (yellow-red card) 89'; Lo Celso (yellow card) 73'; Cavani 75'	Stadium: Roazhon Park; Attendance: 29,194; Referee: Antony Gautier

20 December 2017 19	Monaco	2–1	Rennes	Monaco
20:50 CET (UTC+1)	Falcao 20'; Baldé 81'	Report	H. Traoré (yellow card) 32'; André (yellow card) 54' (yellow-red card) 63'; Khazri 59' (pen.), (yellow card) 78'	Stadium: Stade Louis II; Attendance: 7,542; Referee: Benoît Bastien

13 January 2018 20	Rennes	0–3	Marseille	Rennes
17:00 CET (UTC+1)	André (yellow card) 36'	Report	Germain 35'; Morgan Sanson 45', (yellow card) 65'; Luiz Gustavo (yellow card) 63'; 82' Thauvin	Stadium: Roazhon Park; Attendance: 23,700; Referee: Clément Turpin

17 January 2018 21	Lille	1–2	Rennes	Villeneuve-d'Ascq
19:00 CET (UTC+1)	Alonso 41', (yellow card) 90+4'	Report	Léa Siliki 85'; André 89'	Stadium: Stade Pierre-Mauroy; Attendance: 27,816; Referee: Mikaël Lesage

20 January 2018 22	Rennes	1–0	Angers	Rennes
20:00 CET (UTC+1)	André (yellow card) 6'; Bensebaini (yellow card) 8'; H. Traoré (yellow card) 25'; Bourigeaud 84' (pen.)	Report	Pavlović (yellow card) 0'; Oniangué (yellow card) 31' (yellow-red card) 39'; Mangani (yellow card) 43'; Andreu (yellow card) 75'	Stadium: Roazhon Park; Attendance: 21,186; Referee: Sébastien Moreira

26 January 2018 23	Dijon	2–1	Rennes	Dijon
20:45 CET (UTC+1)	Balmont (yellow card) 13', (goal) 30'; Rosier (yellow card) 43'; Mehdi Abeid (yellow card) 52'; Tavares 65'	Report	Khazri (yellow card) 34'; Sarr 41'; Benjamin André (yellow card) 89'	Stadium: Stade Gaston Gérard; Attendance: 10,091; Referee: Jérôme Brisard

4 February 2018 24	Rennes	0–1	Guingamp	Rennes
15:00 CET (UTC+1)	Gnagnon (yellow card) 10'; H. Traoré (yellow card) 27'; Abeid (yellow card) 52'	Report	Eboa Eboa (yellow card) 4'; Coco (yellow card) 31'; Kerbrat (yellow card) 47'; Briand (yellow card) 87'; Yeni Ngbakoto 90+2'	Stadium: Roazhon Park; Attendance: 28,705; Referee: Ruddy Buquet

11 February 2018 25	Lyon	0–2	Rennes	Décines-Charpieu
21:00 CET (UTC+1)	B. Traoré (yellow card) 58'; Fekir (yellow card) 58'	Report	Khazri 5'; H. Traoré (yellow card) 7'; Léa Siliki 90+3'	Stadium: Parc Olympique Lyonnais; Attendance: 39,188; Referee: Amaury Delerue

17 February 2018 26	Caen	2–2	Rennes	Caen
20:00 CET (UTC+1)	Crivelli 6'; Diomandé (yellow card) 58'; Da Silva 84'; Crivelli (yellow card) 88'	Report	Sakho 9', 21'	Stadium: Stade Michel d'Ornano; Attendance: 16,083; Referee: Sandro Schärer (Switzerland)

24 February 2018 27	Rennes	2–0	Troyes	Rennes
20:00 CET (UTC+1)	Khazri 47' (pen.); Sarr (yellow card) 56'; Sanjin Prcić 72', (yellow card) 57'; Benjamin André (yellow card) 78'	Report	Bellugou (yellow card) 43'; C. Traoré (red card) 90+3'	Stadium: Roazhon Park; Attendance: 17,536; Referee: Thomas Léonard

3 March 2018 28	Amiens	0–2	Rennes	Amiens
20:00 CET (UTC+1)	L. Traoré (yellow card) 14'; Ielsch (yellow card) 39'	Report	Léa Siliki (yellow card) 2'; Khazri 41', (yellow card) 78'; Sarr 86'; H. Traoré (yellow card) 90+2'	Stadium: Stade de la Licorne; Attendance: 10,241; Referee: Nicolas Rainville

10 March 2018 29	Rennes	1–1	Saint-Étienne	Rennes
20:00 CET (UTC+1)	Sarr 86'	Report	Subotić 35'; Hamouma (yellow card) 56'; Dioussé (yellow card) 75'; Debuchy (yellow card) 77'; Perrin (yellow card) 89'	Stadium: Roazhon Park; Attendance: 25,655; Referee: Benoît Bastien

17 March 2018 30	Bordeaux	0–2	Rennes	Bordeaux
17:00 CET (UTC+1)	Pablo (yellow card) 34' de Préville (yellow card) 71'	Report	André (yellow card) 45+1'; Sarr 49'; Gourcuff 86'	Stadium: Nouveau Stade de Bordeaux; Attendance: 32,626; Referee: Mikael Lesage

4 April 2018 31	Rennes	1–1	Monaco	Rennes
18:45 CEST (UTC+02:00)	Gnagnon 20'	Report	Lopes 29'; Jemerson (yellow card) 75'; N'Doram (yellow card) 88'	Stadium: Roazhon Park; Attendance: 17,448; Referee: Amaury Delerue

8 April 2018 32	Nice	1–1	Rennes	Nice
15:00 CEST (UTC+02:00)	Pléa 17'; Souquet (yellow card) 37'; Lees-Melou (yellow card) 69'; Le Marchand (yellow card) 78'; Dante (yellow card) 90+5'	Report	Gelin (yellow card) 9'; Bourigeaud 27'; Khazri (yellow card) 45'; Sarr (yellow card) 82'; André (yellow card) 90+3'	Stadium: Allianz Riviera; Attendance: 23,827; Referee: Jérôme Brisard

14 April 2018 33	Rennes	1–2	Metz	Rennes
20:00 CEST (UTC+02:00)	Bourigeaud 27'; Bensebaini (yellow card) 90+3'	Report	Rivierez (yellow card) 15'; Selimović (yellow card) 48'; Roux 52', 57'; Rivière (yellow card) 62'; Palmieri (yellow card) 74'	Stadium: Roazhon Park; Attendance: 22,855; Referee: Hakim Ben El Hadj

20 April 2018 34	Nantes	1–1	Rennes	Nantes
19:30 CEST (UTC+02:00)	Nakoulma (yellow card) 29'; Sala (yellow card) 40' (yellow-red card) 46'; Thomasson 42', (yellow card) 43'; Girotto (yellow card) 44'; Ngom (yellow card) 90+1'	Report	Sakho (yellow card) 68'; Prcić (yellow card) 71'; Pallois 81' (o.g.)	Stadium: Stade de la Beaujoire; Attendance: 32,431; Referee: Benoît Bastien

29 April 2018 35	Rennes	2–1	Toulouse	Rennes
15:00 CEST (UTC+02:00)	Lea Siliki 39', (yellow card) 50' (yellow-red card) 70'; Bourigeaud 47'	Report	Gnagnon 18' (o.g.); Gradel (yellow card) 50'	Stadium: Roazhon Park; Attendance: 20,138; Referee: Stéphane Jochem

6 May 2018 36	Rennes	2–1	Strasbourg	Rennes
17:00 CEST (UTC+02:00)	Bourigeaud 14' (pen.); Danzé (yellow card) 54'; Hunou 59'	Report	Koné (yellow card) 12'; Liénard 66'	Stadium: Roazhon Park; Attendance: 23,554; Referee: Benoît Millot

12 May 2018 37	Paris Saint-Germain	0–2	Rennes	Paris
21:00 CEST (UTC+2)	Kimpembe (yellow card) 49'	Report	Bourigeaud 52' (pen.); Hunou 71'	Stadium: Parc de Princes; Attendance: 47,352; Referee: Jérôme Brisard

19 May 2018 38	Rennes	1–1	Montpellier	Rennes
21:00 CEST (UTC+02:00)	Hunou 13'	Report	Mbenza 17'; Porsan-Clémenté (yellow card) 53'	Stadium: Roazhon Park; Attendance: 28,126; Referee: Karim Abed

=== Coupe de France ===
7 January 2018 Round of 64	Rennes	1–6	Paris Saint-Germain	Rennes
21:00 CET (UTC+1)	Bourigeaud 66' (pen.)		Mbappé 9', 74'; Neymar 17', 43'; Di María 24', 76'	Stadium: Roazhon Park; Attendance: 19,777; Referee: Amaury Delerue

=== Coupe de la Ligue ===
25 October 2017 Third round	Dijon	1–2	Rennes	Dijon
21:05 CEST (UTC+02:00)	Jeannot (yellow card) 2'; Sammaritano 15'; Balmont (yellow card) 88'		Khazri 43'; Hunou 87'; Brandon (yellow card) 88'	Stadium: Stade Gaston Gérard; Attendance: 10,507; Referee: Jérôme Brisard

13 December 2017 Round of 16	Rennes	2–2 (4–3 p)	Marseille	Rennes
18:45 CET (UTC+01:00)	André 23'; Traoré (yellow card) 44'; Khazri 57'		Mitroglou 13'; Amavi (yellow card) 42'; Germain 80'; Rolando (yellow card) 83'; Ocampos (yellow card) 85'	Stadium: Roazhon Park; Attendance: 22,906; Referee: Johan Hamel
	Penalties
	Khazri (penalty scored); André (penalty scored); Gnagnon (penalty scored); Gelin (penalty missed); Bourigeaud (penalty scored)		(penalty scored) Germain; (penalty scored) Mitroglou; (penalty missed) Ocampos; (penalty missed) Sarr; (penalty scored) Sanson

9 January 2018 Quarter-finals	Rennes	4–2	Toulouse	Rennes
18:45 CEST (UTC+01:00)	Yago 21' (o.g.); Bourigeaud 42'; Bensebaini (yellow card) 69'; Hunou 86', 90+2'; Diallo (yellow card) 90'		Sylla 40', (yellow card) 82'; Sanogo 63'; Diop (yellow card) 85'; Jean (yellow card) 88'	Stadium: Roazhon Park; Attendance: 16,766; Referee: Benoît Millot

30 January 2018 Semi-finals	Rennes	2–3	Paris Saint-Germain	Rennes
21:05 CET (UTC+1)	Sarr (yellow card) 28'; Prcić (yellow card) 65', (goal) 90+2'; Traoré (yellow card) 69'; Khazri (yellow card) 69'; Sakho 85'; Lea Siliki (yellow card) 87'		Meunier 24'; Marquinhos 53'; Lo Celso 58'; Mbappé (red card) 62'; Neymar (yellow card) 90+3'	Stadium: Roazhon Park; Attendance: 28,620; Referee: Mikael Lesage
