= Joris Gnagnon =

French association football player (born 1997)

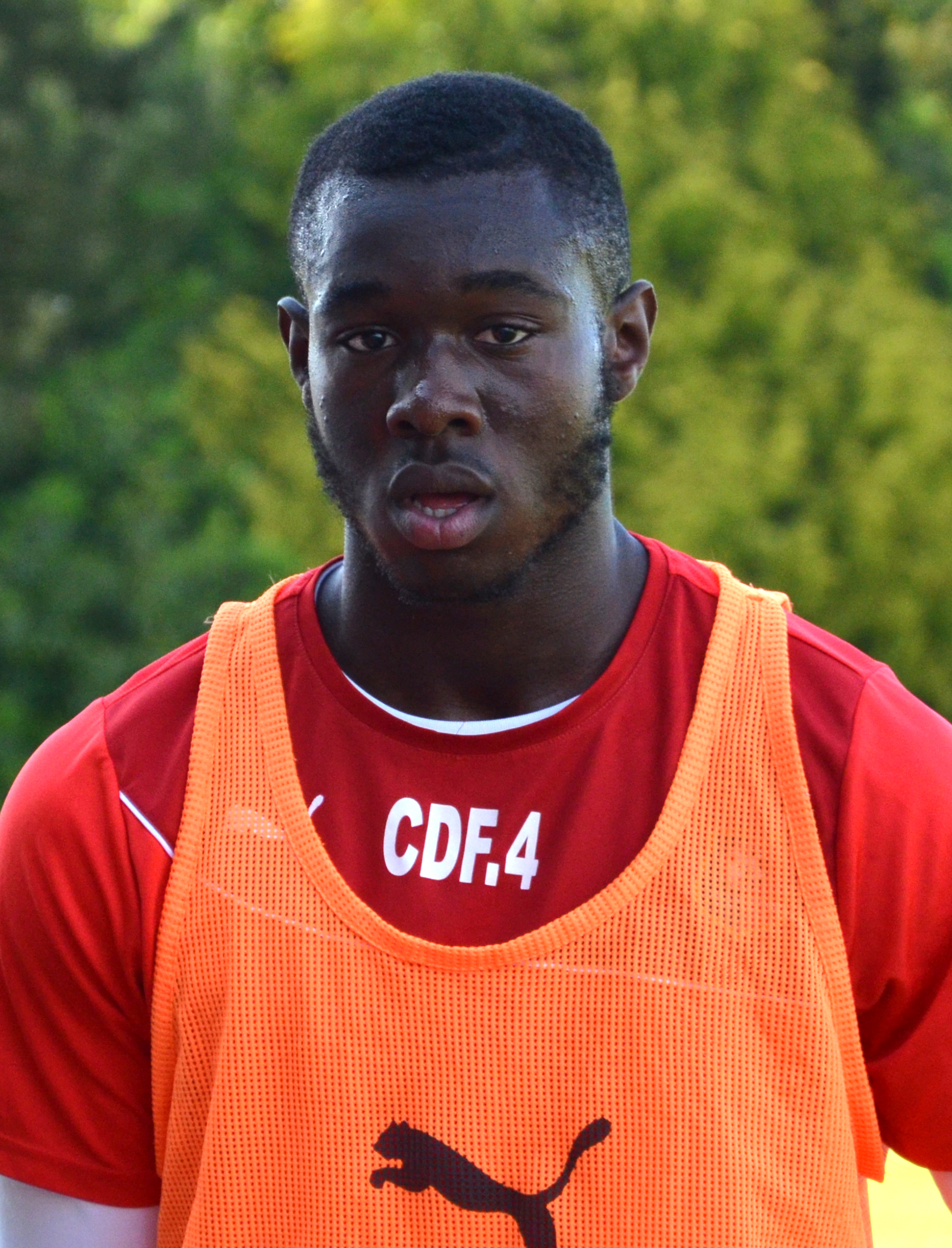
- Gnagnon with Rennes in 2015

Personal information
- Full name: Joris Gnagnon
- Date of birth: 13 January 1997 (age 29)
- Place of birth: Bondy, France
- Height: 1.82 m (6 ft 0 in)
- Position: Centre-back

Youth career
- 2003–2008: UF Clichois
- 2008–2010: FC Montfermeil
- 2011: UF Clichois
- 2011–2014: FC Montfermeil
- 2014–2016: Rennes

Senior career*
Years	Team	Apps	(Gls)
2014–2016	Rennes II	24	(3)
2016–2018	Rennes	70	(3)
2018–2021	Sevilla	7	(0)
2019–2020	→ Rennes (loan)	19	(0)
2021–2022	Saint-Étienne	0	(0)
2022	Saint-Étienne II	2	(0)

International career
2017	France U20	2	(0)
2018	France U21	3	(0)
- * Club domestic league appearances and goals

Joris Gnagnon (born 13 January 1997) is a French former professional footballer who played as a centre-back.

== Club career ==
=== Rennes ===
Born in Bondy next to Paris, Gnagnon is a youth exponent from Stade Rennais. He made his Ligue 1 debut on 16 January 2016 against Troyes AC, playing the entire second half. He scored his first Ligue 1 goal on 28 January 2017, in a Derby Breton against Nantes to draw the game in the 86th minute.

=== Sevilla ===
On 25 July 2018, Gnagnon joined Spanish side Sevilla FC for five years. Gnagnon came under criticism in July 2019 after aggressively kicking Liverpool player Yasser Larouci in a pre-season friendly in Boston, causing the 18 year old to leave the pitch on a stretcher and Gnagnon to be given a red card.

On 26 August 2019, Gnagnon returned to Rennes on a one year loan deal.

On 22 September 2021, Gnagnon was sacked by Sevilla for a lack of professionalism with the club citing concerns about his discipline and physical fitness.

=== Saint-Étienne ===
After being released from his contract with Sevilla, Gnagnon signed with French side Saint-Étienne on 26 November 2021. He failed to make a competitive appearance for the club before leaving by mutual consent in May 2022.

== International career ==
On 25 March 2017, Gnagnon made his debut for the France under-20 team. His first ever game for a French youth team.

He later chose to represent the Ivory Coast national team, for whom he is eligible through his family's Ivorian origins. He was called up to the Ivory Coast national team for the first time on 19 May 2017.

However, he never made an appearance for the African nation and stated in May 2018 that he had not ruled out playing for the European country at senior level, despite switching allegiance to Ivory Coast the previous year. He was subsequently called up by the France under-21 team for friendlies against Switzerland and Italy in May 2018.

== Career statistics ==
As of match played 15 December 2020

Appearances and goals by club, season and competition
Club	Season	League			National Cup		League Cup		Continental		Other		Total	
Club	Season	Division	Apps	Goals	Apps	Goals	Apps	Goals	Apps	Goals	Apps	Goals	Apps	Goals
Rennes B	2014–15	CFA 2	3	0	—		—		—		—		3	0
Rennes B	2015–16	CFA 2	13	2	—		—		—		—		13	2
Rennes B	2016–17	CFA	8	1	—		—		—		—		8	1
Rennes B	Total		24	3	—		—		—		—		24	3
Rennes	2015–16	Ligue 1	7	0	1	0	0	0	—		—		8	0
Rennes	2016–17	Ligue 1	27	1	2	1	1	0	—		—		30	2
Rennes	2017–18	Ligue 1	36	2	1	0	4	0	—		—		41	2
Rennes	Total		70	3	4	1	5	0	—		—		79	4
Sevilla	2018–19	La Liga	7	0	3	0	—		6 (Note: Appearances in UEFA Europa League)	0	0	0	16	0
Sevilla	2020–21	La Liga	0	0	1	0	—		0	0	0	0	1	0
Sevilla	Total		7	0	4	0	—		6	0	0	0	17	0
Rennes (loan)	2019–20	Ligue 1	19	0	5	0	1	0	6	2	—		31	2
Saint-Étienne	2021–22	Ligue 1	0	0	0	0	—		—		—		0	0
Career total			120	6	13	1	6	0	12	2	0	0	151	9
