= James Léa Siliki =

Cameroonian footballer (born 1996)

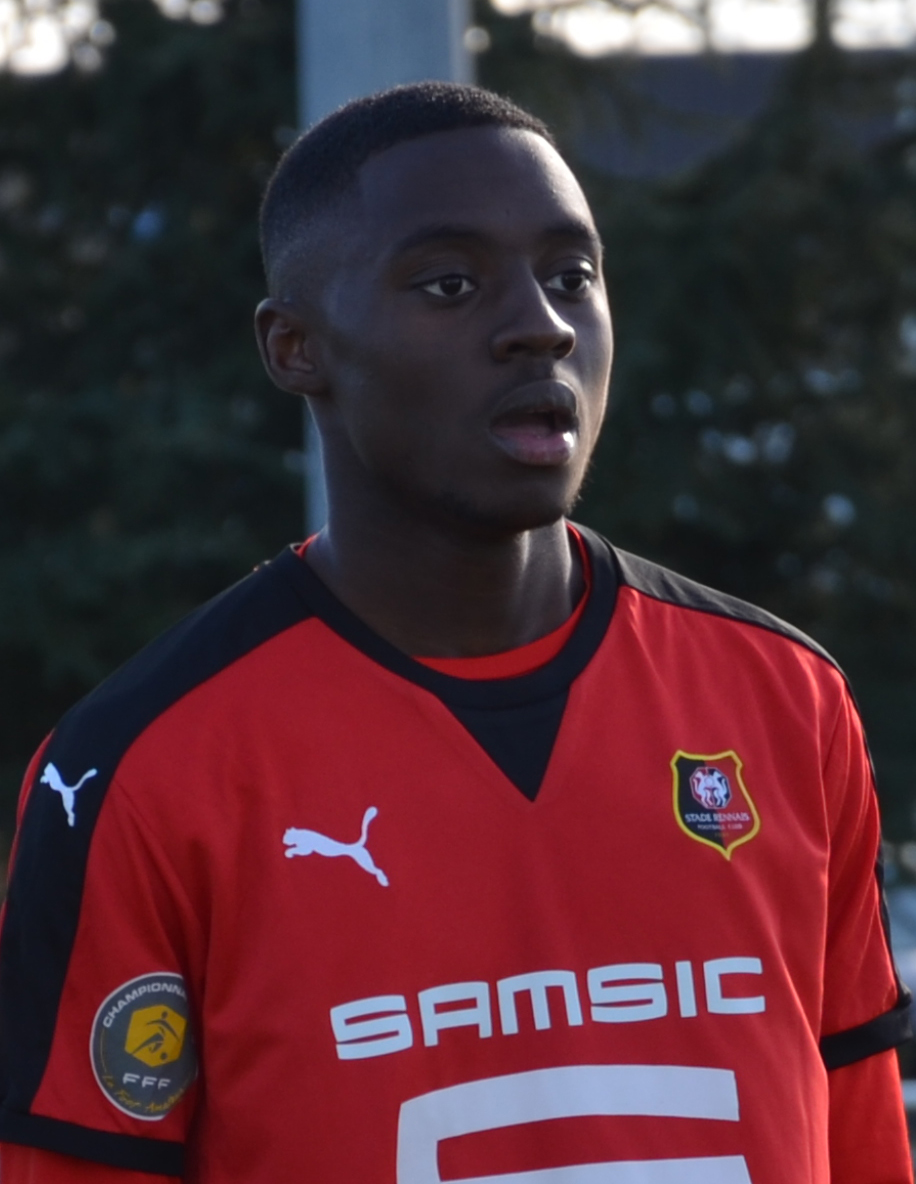
- Léa Siliki with Rennes in 2016

Personal information
- Full name: James-Edward Manfred Léa Siliki
- Date of birth: 12 June 1996 (age 30)
- Place of birth: Sarcelles, France
- Height: 1.83 m (6 ft 0 in)
- Position: Midfielder

Youth career
- 2002–2004: RC Gonesse
- 2004–2011: Paris Saint-Germain
- 2011–2014: Guingamp

Senior career*
Years	Team	Apps	(Gls)
2014	Guingamp B	3	(1)
2014–2020	Rennes B	56	(11)
2017–2022	Rennes	84	(3)
2021–2022	→ Middlesbrough (loan)	11	(0)
2022–2023	Estoril	22	(3)
2024	Gençlerbirliği	9	(0)
2025	Gloria Buzău	4	(0)

International career^{‡}
2014	France U19	3	(0)
2021–2022	Cameroon	11	(0)
Medal record
Men's football
Representing Cameroon
Africa Cup of Nations
Third place	2021 Cameroon
- * Club domestic league appearances and goals as of 11 April 2025 ‡ National team caps and goals as of 3 February 2022

James-Edward Manfred Léa Siliki (born 12 June 1996) is a professional footballer who plays as a midfielder. Born in France, he represented Cameroon at international level.

== Early life ==
Léa Siliki was born in Sarcelles, France, to Cameroonian parents. He acquired French nationality on 18 November 1998, through the collective effect of his parents' naturalization.

== Club career ==
Léa Siliki made his Ligue 1 debut with Rennes on 28 January 2017 against Nantes, replacing Aldo Kalulu after 78 minutes.

On 31 August 2021, Léa Siliki joined EFL Championship club Middlesbrough on loan for the duration of the 2021–22 season. Having not played a single minute since the manager who had brought Léa Siliki to Teesside, Neil Warnock, had been replaced by Chris Wilder, the midfielder was told by Wilder that he could leave the club during the January transfer window. His return to action came in February 2022, being replaced at half-time during a 3–2 defeat to struggling Barnsley.

On 22 July 2022, Léa Siliki signed for Primeira Liga club Estoril on a three-year contract. On 1 September 2023, Estoril announced that Léa Siliki's contract had been terminated by mutual agreement, after he had been frozen out of the squad by manager Álvaro Pacheco.

On 9 February 2024, Siliki signed with Gençlerbirliği in Turkey until the end of the 2023–24 season.

== International career ==
He played for the France U19 national team in 2014. He debuted with the senior Cameroon national team in a 1–0 friendly win over Nigeria on 4 June 2021.

== Personal life ==
In March 2022, Léa Siliki was subjected to racist abuse on Instagram after posting a celebration of Cameroon's qualification for the 2022 FIFA World Cup.

== Career statistics ==
As of match played 11 April 2025

Appearances and goals by club, season and competition
Club	Season	League			National cup (Note: Includes Coupe de France, Taça de Portugal)		League cup (Note: Includes Coupe de la Ligue, Taça da Liga)		Continental		Other		Total	
Club	Season	Division	Apps	Goals	Apps	Goals	Apps	Goals	Apps	Goals	Apps	Goals	Apps	Goals
Guingamp B	2013–14	CFA 2	3	1	—		—		—		—		3	1
Rennes B	2014–15	CFA 2	9	1	—		—		—		—		9	1
Rennes B	2015–16	CFA 2	20	2	—		—		—		—		20	2
Rennes B	2016–17	CFA	21	7	—		—		—		—		21	7
Rennes B	2017–18	National 2	1	1	—		—		—		—		1	1
Rennes B	2018–19	National 3	4	0	—		—		—		—		4	0
Rennes B	2019–20	National 3	0	0	—		—		—		—		0	0
Rennes B	2020–21	National 3	1	0	—		—		—		—		1	0
Rennes B	Total		56	11	—		—		—		—		56	11
Rennes	2016–17	Ligue 1	1	0	1	0	0	0	—		—		2	0
Rennes	2017–18	Ligue 1	32	3	1	0	3	0	—		—		36	3
Rennes	2018–19	Ligue 1	24	0	3	0	1	0	6 (Note: Appearances in UEFA Europa League)	0	—		34	0
Rennes	2019–20	Ligue 1	20	0	5	1	0	0	3	0	1 (Note: Appearance in Trophée des Champions)	0	29	1
Rennes	2020–21	Ligue 1	7	0	1	0	—		4 (Note: Appearances in UEFA Champions League)	0	—		12	0
Rennes	2021–22	Ligue 1	0	0	—		—		0	0	—		0	0
Rennes	Total		84	3	11	1	4	0	13	0	1	0	113	4
Middlesbrough (loan)	2021–22	Championship	11	0	0	0	—		—		—		11	0
Estoril	2022–23	Primeira Liga	22	3	2	1	1	0	—		—		25	4
Estoril	2023–24	Primeira Liga	0	0	—		0	0	—		—		0	0
Estoril	Total		22	3	2	1	1	0	—		—		25	4
Gençlerbirliği	2023–24	TFF First League	9	0	—		—		—		—		9	0
Gloria Buzău	2024–25	Liga I	4	0	—		—		—		—		4	0
Career total			189	18	13	2	5	0	13	0	1	0	221	20

=== International ===
As of match played 3 February 2022

Appearances and goals by national team and year
National team	Year	Apps	Goals
Cameroon
Cameroon	2021	7	0
Cameroon	2014	4	0
Total		11	0

== Honours ==
Rennes B

- CFA 2 — Group A: 2015–16

Rennes

- Coupe de France: 2018–19
- Trophée des Champions runner-up: 2019

Cameroon

- Africa Cup of Nations third place: 2021
