= Benjamin Bourigeaud =

French footballer (born 1994)

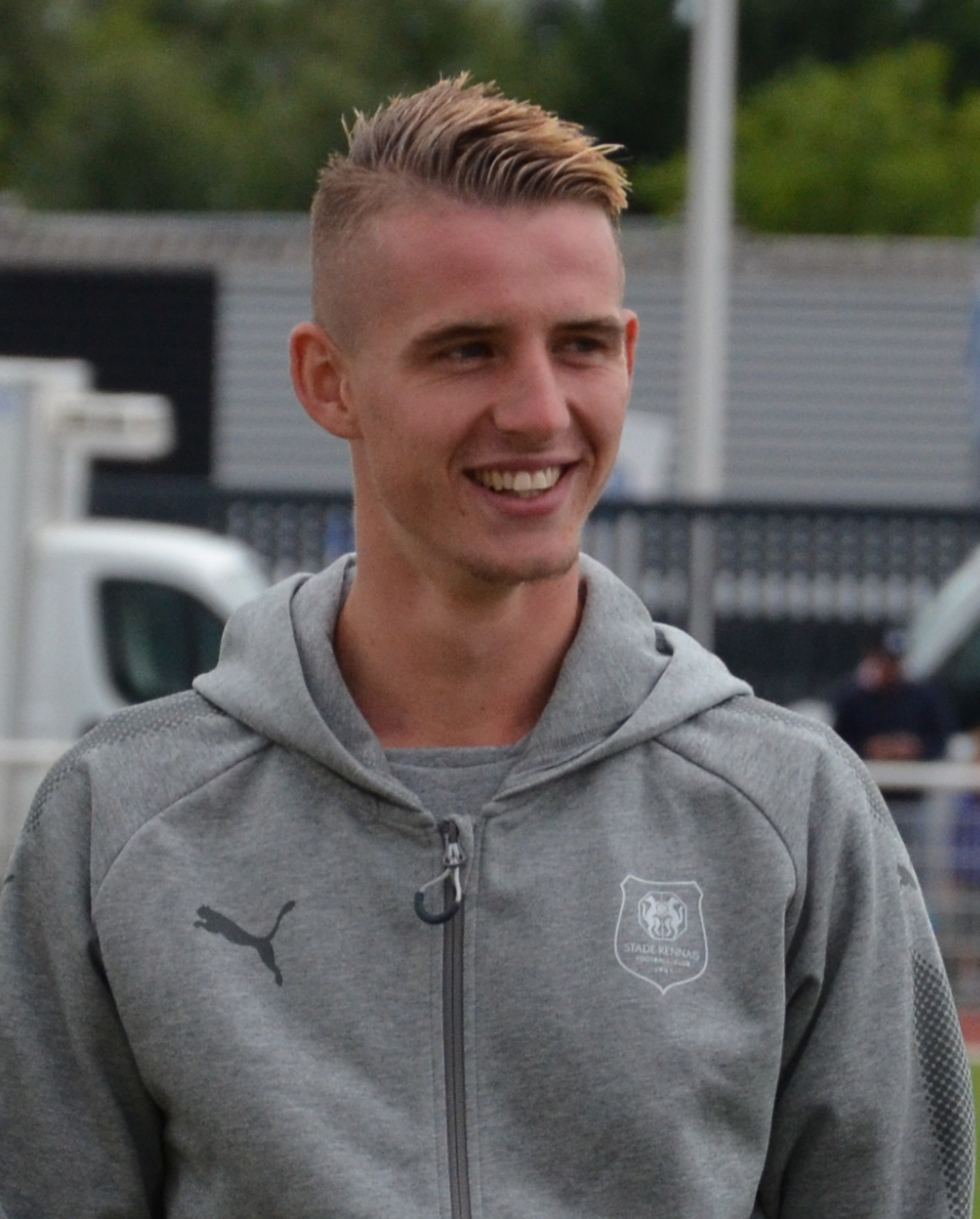
- Bourigeaud with Rennes in 2017

Personal information
- Date of birth: 14 January 1994 (age 32)
- Place of birth: Calais, France
- Height: 1.78 m (5 ft 10 in)
- Position: Midfielder

Team information
- Current team: Al Ahli SC
- Number: 27

Youth career
- 2000–2002: Calais Beau Marais F.
- 2002–2005: Ent. S. Calaisis Coulogne
- 2005–2013: Lens

Senior career*
Years	Team	Apps	(Gls)
2012–2015	Lens B	32	(3)
2013–2017	Lens	101	(9)
2017–2024	Rennes	241	(52)
2024–2026	Al-Duhail	37	(6)
2026–	Al Ahli SC	1	(0)

International career
2014	France U20	2	(0)
- * Club domestic league appearances and goals as of 22 August 2026

Benjamin Bourigeaud (French pronunciation: [bɛ̃ʒamɛ̃ buʁiʒo]; born 14 January 1994) is a French professional footballer who plays as a midfielder for Qatar Stars League club Al Ahli SC.

== Career statistics ==
As of match played 24 November 2025

Appearances and goals by club, season, and competition
Club	Season	League			National cup (Note: Includes Coupe de France, Emir of Qatar Cup)		League cup (Note: Includes Coupe de la Ligue, Qatari Stars Cup)		Continental		Other		Total	
Club	Season	Division	Apps	Goals	Apps	Goals	Apps	Goals	Apps	Goals	Apps	Goals	Apps	Goals
Lens B	2012–13	CFA	23	2	—		—		—		—		23	2
Lens B	2013–14	CFA	5	1	—		—		—		—		5	1
Lens B	2014–15	CFA	2	0	—		—		—		—		2	0
Lens B	2015–16	CFA	2	0	—		—		—		—		2	0
Lens B	Total		32	3	—		—		—		—		32	3
Lens	2013–14	Ligue 2	16	0	6	1	0	0	—		—		22	1
Lens	2014–15	Ligue 1	20	2	1	0	1	0	—		—		22	2
Lens	2015–16	Ligue 2	30	4	1	1	1	0	—		—		32	5
Lens	2016–17	Ligue 2	35	3	0	0	3	2	—		—		38	5
Lens	Total		101	9	8	2	5	2	—		—		114	13
Rennes	2017–18	Ligue 1	37	10	1	1	3	1	—		—		41	12
Rennes	2018–19	Ligue 1	34	6	6	1	2	1	10 (Note: Appearances in UEFA Europa League)	1	—		52	9
Rennes	2019–20	Ligue 1	25	2	4	0	1	1	5	0	1 (Note: Appearance in Trophée des Champions)	0	36	3
Rennes	2020–21	Ligue 1	37	6	1	0	—		5 (Note: Appearances in UEFA Champions League)	0	—		43	6
Rennes	2021–22	Ligue 1	38	11	1	0	—		9 (Note: Appearances in UEFA Europa Conference League)	1	—		48	12
Rennes	2022–23	Ligue 1	37	7	2	1	—		7	0	—		46	8
Rennes	2023–24	Ligue 1	32	9	5	3	—		7	3	—		44	15
Rennes	2024–25	Ligue 1	1	1	—		—		—		—		1	1
Rennes	Total		241	52	20	6	6	3	43	5	1	0	311	66
Al-Duhail	2024–25	Qatar Stars League	18	3	2	1	5	3	—		2 (Note: Appearances in Qatar Cup)	1	27	8
Al-Duhail	2025–26	Qatar Stars League	9	1	0	0	0	0	6 (Note: Appearances in AFC Champions League Elite)	1	0	0	15	2
Al-Duhail	Total		27	4	2	1	5	3	6	2	2	1	42	10
Career total			401	68	29	7	16	8	49	6	3	1	498	90

== Honours ==
Rennes

- Coupe de France: 2018–19

Individual

- UNFP Ligue 1 Player of the Month: April 2022
