= Pépé Bonet =

Congolese footballer (born 2003)

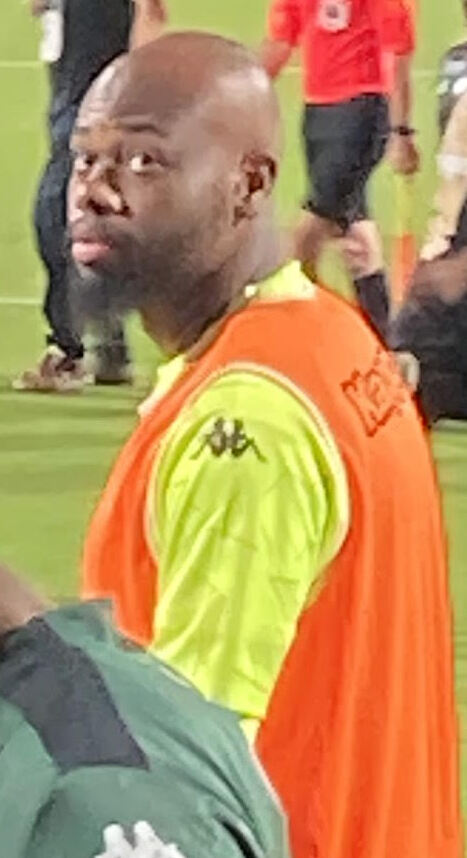
- Bonet with Red Star in 2024

Personal information
- Full name: Pépé Bonet Kapambu
- Date of birth: 13 February 2003 (age 23)
- Place of birth: Kinshasa, DR Congo
- Height: 1.93 m (6 ft 4 in)
- Position: Goalkeeper

Team information
- Current team: Mamer 32
- Number: 1

Youth career
- FCM Garges
- 2008–2019: Rennes

Senior career*
Years	Team	Apps	(Gls)
2019–2022	Rennes II	25	(0)
2019–2022	Rennes	1	(0)
2022–2025	Red Star	2	(0)
2026–	Mamer 32	3	(0)
- * Club domestic league appearances and goals as of 25 May 2026

Pépé Bonet Kapambu (born 13 February 2003) is a Congolese professional footballer who plays as a goalkeeper for Luxembourgish side Mamer 32.

== Career ==
On 10 July 2019, Bonet signed his first professional contract with Rennes. He made his professional debut with Rennes in a 1–0 UEFA Europa League loss to CFR Cluj on 24 October 2019.

On 22 June 2022, Bonet signed with Red Star.
