= Parfait Mandanda =

Footballer (born 1989)

Personal information
- Date of birth: 10 October 1989 (age 37)
- Place of birth: Nevers, France
- Height: 1.82 m (6 ft 0 in)
- Position: Goalkeeper

Team information
- Current team: Caen
- Number: 35

Youth career
- 1999–2001: Caen
- 2001–2008: Bordeaux

Senior career*
Years	Team	Apps	(Gls)
2008–2009	Bordeaux	0	(0)
2009	→ Beauvais (loan)	1	(0)
2009–2010	Beauvais	1	(0)
2010–2011	Altay	12	(0)
2011–2021	Charleroi	88	(0)
2019	→ Dinamo București (loan)	12	(0)
2020	→ Hartford Athletic (loan)	16	(0)
2021–2022	Mouscron	9	(0)
2023–	Caen II	22	(0)
2024–	Caen	0	(0)

International career
2007	France U21	1	(0)
2008–2019	DR Congo	20	(0)
- * Club domestic league appearances and goals as of 23 June 2026

Parfait Mandanda (born 10 October 1989) is a professional footballer who plays as a goalkeeper for Ligue 3 club Caen. Born in France, he represented DR Congo at international level.

== Club career ==
Born in Nevers, Mandanda began his career at Stade Malherbe Caen, moving in 2001 to French Ligue 1 club Bordeaux in the youth system. He graduated to the first team in 2008. He was loaned out to AS Beauvais from Bordeaux in January 2009 for the rest of the season, and in July 2009, Beauvais took up the option to make Madanda's move permanent. in 2010 he moved to Altay S.K., then playing in Turkish second division TFF First League.

=== Charleroi ===
Mandanda signed with Belgian Pro League club Sporting Charleroi in 2011. In February 2019, he joined Dinamo București on loan.

=== Hartford ===
Charleroi loaned Mandanda to USL Championship club Hartford Athletic for the 2020 season. In his first game with the club he recorded a shutout and an assist in the team's 1–0 win over New York Red Bulls II and was named man of the match.

=== Mouscron ===
On 20 July 2021, he joined Mouscron for a one-year term with an option for the second year.

== International career ==
Mandanda was named in the Congo DR squad against France B on 5 February 2008. Mandanda only played in the second half but missed out on a place in the history books as his older brother Steve Mandanda, also a goalkeeper and currently at Olympique de Marseille, only played in the first half for France.

Officially, he gained his first cap for DR Congo national football team against Gabon on 25 March 2008.

== Personal life ==
Parfait is the younger brother of French international and Marseille goalkeeper Steve Mandanda, and has two younger brothers. They are all goalkeepers: Riffi and Over Mandanda.

== Honours ==
DR Congo

- Africa Cup of Nations bronze: 2015
