= Adrien Hunou =

French footballer (born 1994)

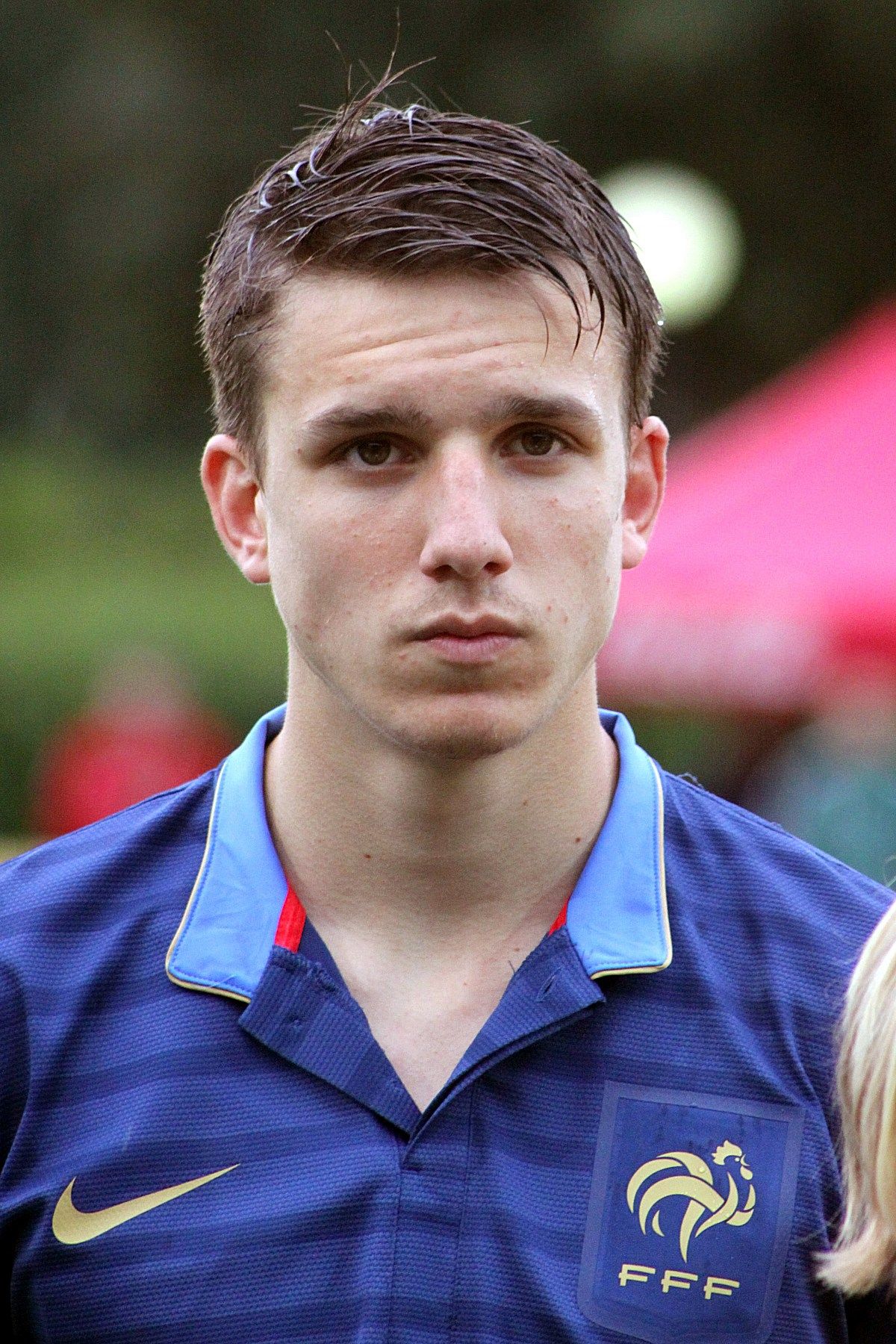
- Hunou with France U19 in 2013

Personal information
- Date of birth: 19 January 1994 (age 32)
- Place of birth: Évry, France
- Height: 1.79 m (5 ft 10 in)
- Positions: Attacking midfielder; forward

Team information
- Current team: Clermont
- Number: 23

Youth career
- 2000–2008: Sénart-Moissy
- 2008–2009: Torcy
- 2009–2010: INF Clairefontaine
- 2010–2013: Rennes

Senior career*
Years	Team	Apps	(Gls)
2012–2017	Rennes B	49	(14)
2013–2021	Rennes	124	(25)
2014–2016	→ Clermont (loan)	47	(11)
2021–2022	Minnesota United	35	(7)
2022	Minnesota United 2	1	(1)
2022–2025	Angers	58	(5)
2024–2025	Angers B	11	(2)
2025–	Clermont	18	(2)

International career
2012	France U18	6	(1)
2012–2013	France U19	15	(4)
2013–2015	France U20	12	(2)
- * Club domestic league appearances and goals as of 12 May 2026

Adrien Hunou (born 19 January 1994) is a French professional footballer who plays as an attacking midfielder and forward for Ligue 2 club Clermont. He has represented France at youth level, having played for the under-18, under-19, and under-20 teams.

== Club career ==
=== Rennes ===
Hunou made his Ligue 1 debut at 25 August 2013 against Evian, replacing Nélson Oliveira after 87 minutes. He was loaned to Ligue 2 side Clermont in December 2014.

On 21 September 2016, Hunou made his first appearance of the 2016–17 season in Ligue 1 and scored his first goal for Rennes, contributing the late winner in a 3–2 defeat of Marseille.

=== Minnesota United ===
On 23 April 2021, Hunou signed with Major League Soccer club Minnesota United.

=== Angers ===
On 29 June 2022, Hunou returned to France, signing for Ligue 1 side Angers on a three-year contract.

=== Return to Clermont ===
On 25 June 2025, Hunou returned to Clermont on a two-season contract.

== International career ==
Born in France, Hunou is of Polish descent through a grandmother. Hunou has represented France's U18, U19 and U20 international youth teams.

In February 2021, Hunou expressed a desire to play for the Poland national team.

== Career statistics ==
As of match played 27 April 2024

Appearances and goals by club, season and competition
Club	Season	League			National cup		League cup		Continental		Other		Total	
Club	Season	Division	Apps	Goals	Apps	Goals	Apps	Goals	Apps	Goals	Apps	Goals	Apps	Goals
Rennes B	2012–13	CFA 2	23	7	—		—		—		—		23	7
Rennes B	2013–14	CFA 2	12	1	—		—		—		—		12	1
Rennes B	2014–15	CFA 2	7	3	—		—		—		—		7	3
Rennes B	2016–17	CFA	4	3	—		—		—		—		4	3
Rennes B	2017–18	National 2	3	0	—		—		—		—		3	0
Rennes B	Total		49	14	—		—		—		—		49	14
Rennes	2012–13	Ligue 1	0	0	—		—		—		—		16	0
Rennes	2013–14	Ligue 1	16	0	2	0	2	1	—		—		20	1
Rennes	2014–15	Ligue 1	0	0	—		0	0	—		—		0	0
Rennes	2015–16	Ligue 1	0	0	—		—		—		—		0	0
Rennes	2016–17	Ligue 1	22	1	2	0	1	0	—		—		25	1
Rennes	2017–18	Ligue 1	24	5	0	0	4	3	—		—		28	8
Rennes	2018–19	Ligue 1	19	7	4	2	0	0	6	2	—		29	11
Rennes	2019–20	Ligue 1	23	8	5	0	1	1	4	1	1	1	34	11
Rennes	2020–21	Ligue 1	20	4	1	0	—		3	0	—		24	4
Rennes	Total		124	25	14	2	8	5	13	3	1	1	157	36
Clermont (loan)	2014–15	Ligue 2	14	4	—		—		—		—		14	4
Clermont (loan)	2015–16	Ligue 2	33	7	2	0	—		—		—		35	7
Clermont (loan)	Total		47	11	2	0	—		—		—		49	11
Minnesota United	2021	MLS	26	7	—		—		—		1	0	27	7
Minnesota United	2022	MLS	9	0	3	2	—		—		—		12	2
Minnesota United	Total		35	7	3	2	—		—		1	0	39	9
Minnesota United 2	2022	MLS Next Pro	1	1	—		—		—		—		1	1
Angers	2022–23	Ligue 1	34	4	3	0	—		—		—		37	4
Angers	2023–24	Ligue 2	24	1	3	1	—		—		—		27	2
Angers	Total		58	5	6	1	—		—		—		64	6
Career total			314	63	25	5	8	5	13	3	2	1	363	77

== Honours ==
Rennes

- Coupe de France: 2018–19; runner-up: 2013–14

France U19

- UEFA European Under-19 Championship runner-up: 2013

France U20

- Toulon Tournament: 2015
