= Flavien Tait =

French footballer (born 1993)

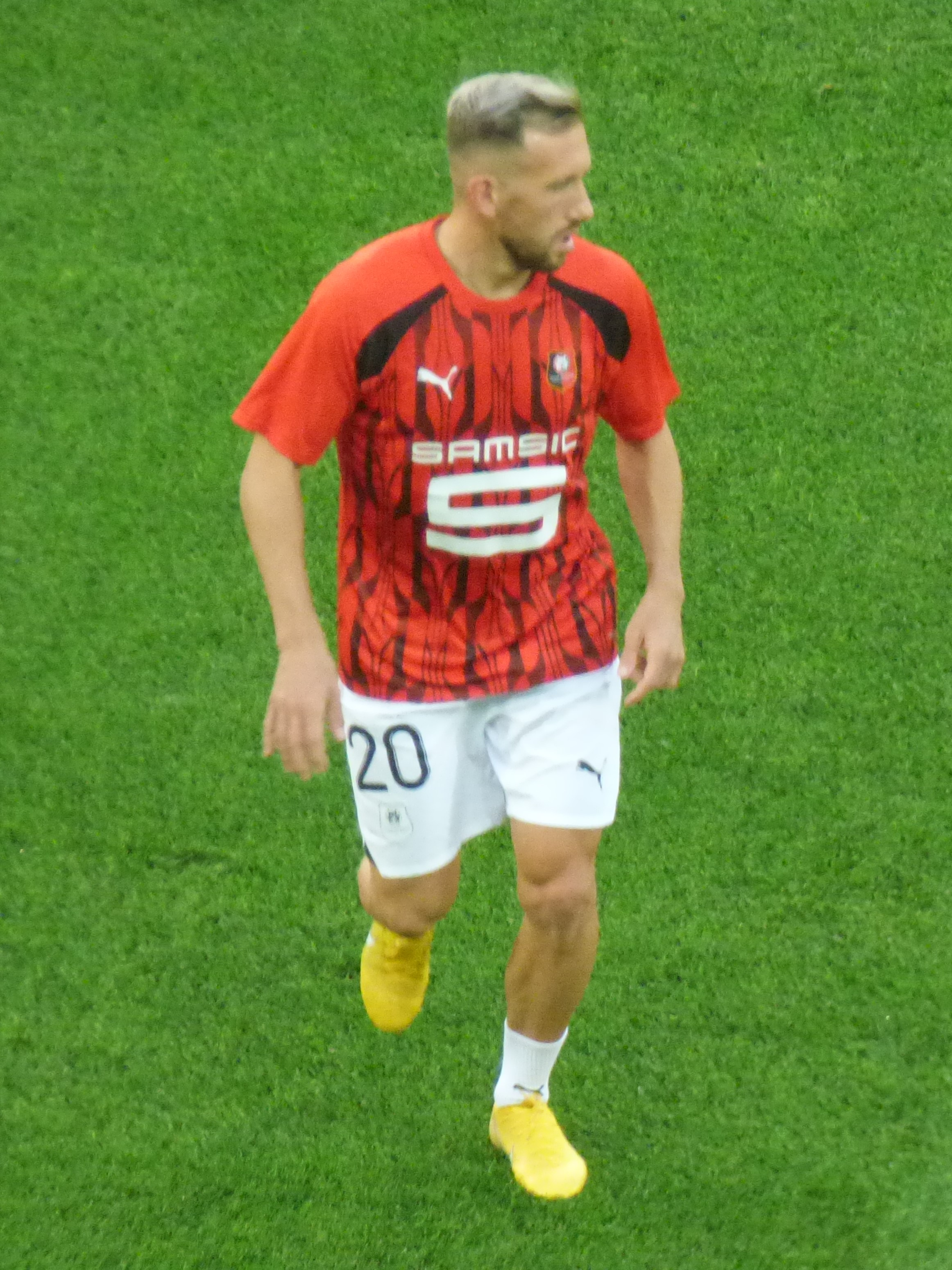
- Tait with Rennes in 2023

Personal information
- Date of birth: 2 February 1993 (age 33)
- Place of birth: Longjumeau, France
- Height: 1.75 m (5 ft 9 in)
- Position: Midfielder

Youth career
- –2010: Rodez
- 2010–2012: Châteauroux

Senior career*
Years	Team	Apps	(Gls)
2012–2014	Châteauroux II	28	(6)
2013–2016	Châteauroux	76	(9)
2016–2017	Angers II	6	(0)
2016–2019	Angers	78	(11)
2019–2023	Rennes	98	(10)
2023–2025	Samsunspor	38	(1)
2025–2026	Rodez	3	(0)
- * Club domestic league appearances and goals as of 3 January 2026

Flavien Tait (born 2 February 1993) is a French professional footballer who plays as a midfielder.

== Career ==
Tait was born in Longjumeau, France. He made his senior debut for Châteauroux in 2010.

On 16 June 2016, Tait signed a two-year contract with Ligue 1 club Angers. After playing more than 70 games for Angers, he joined Ligue 1 rivals Rennes.

On 6 September 2023, Tait signed a three-year contract with recently promoted to Süper Lig club Samsunspor.

== Career statistics ==
As of match played 21 May 2023

Appearances and goals by club, season and competition
Club	Season	League			National cup		League cup		Continental		Other		Total	
Club	Season	Division	Apps	Goals	Apps	Goals	Apps	Goals	Apps	Goals	Apps	Goals	Apps	Goals
Châteauroux II	2012–13	CFA 2	20	2	—		—		—		—		20	2
Châteauroux II	2013–14	CFA 2	6	3	—		—		—		—		6	3
Châteauroux II	2014–15	CFA 2	2	1	—		—		—		—		2	1
Châteauroux II	Total		28	6	—		—		—		—		28	6
Châteauroux	2012–13	Ligue 2	1	0	0	0	0	0	—		—		1	0
Châteauroux	2013–14	Ligue 2	25	4	0	0	1	0	—		—		26	4
Châteauroux	2014–15	Ligue 2	19	1	2	0	0	0	—		—		21	1
Châteauroux	2015–16	Championnat National	31	4	2	0	1	0	—		—		34	4
Châteauroux	Total		76	9	4	0	2	0	—		—		82	9
Angers II	2016–17	CFA 2	6	0	—		—		—		—		6	0
Angers	2016–17	Ligue 1	11	2	4	0	1	0	—		—		16	2
Angers	2017–18	Ligue 1	31	4	1	0	2	0	—		—		34	4
Angers	2018–19	Ligue 1	36	5	0	0	1	0	—		—		37	5
Angers	Total		78	11	5	0	4	0	—		—		87	11
Rennes	2019–20	Ligue 1	17	2	3	0	1	0	4 (Note: Appearance(s) in UEFA Europa League)	0	1 (Note: Appearance(s) in Trophée des Champions)	0	26	2
Rennes	2020–21	Ligue 1	23	1	0	0	—		3 (Note: Appearance(s) in UEFA Champions League)	0	—		26	1
Rennes	2021–22	Ligue 1	28	5	2	0	—		9 (Note: Appearance(s) in UEFA Europa Conference League)	2	—		39	7
Rennes	2022–23	Ligue 1	30	2	1	0	—		7	0	—		38	2
Rennes	Total		98	10	6	0	1	0	23	0	1	0	129	12
Samsunspor	2023–24	Süper Lig	0	0	0	0	—		—		—		0	0
Career total			252	30	15	0	7	0	23	0	1	0	298	32
