= Yann Gboho =

Footballer (born 2001)

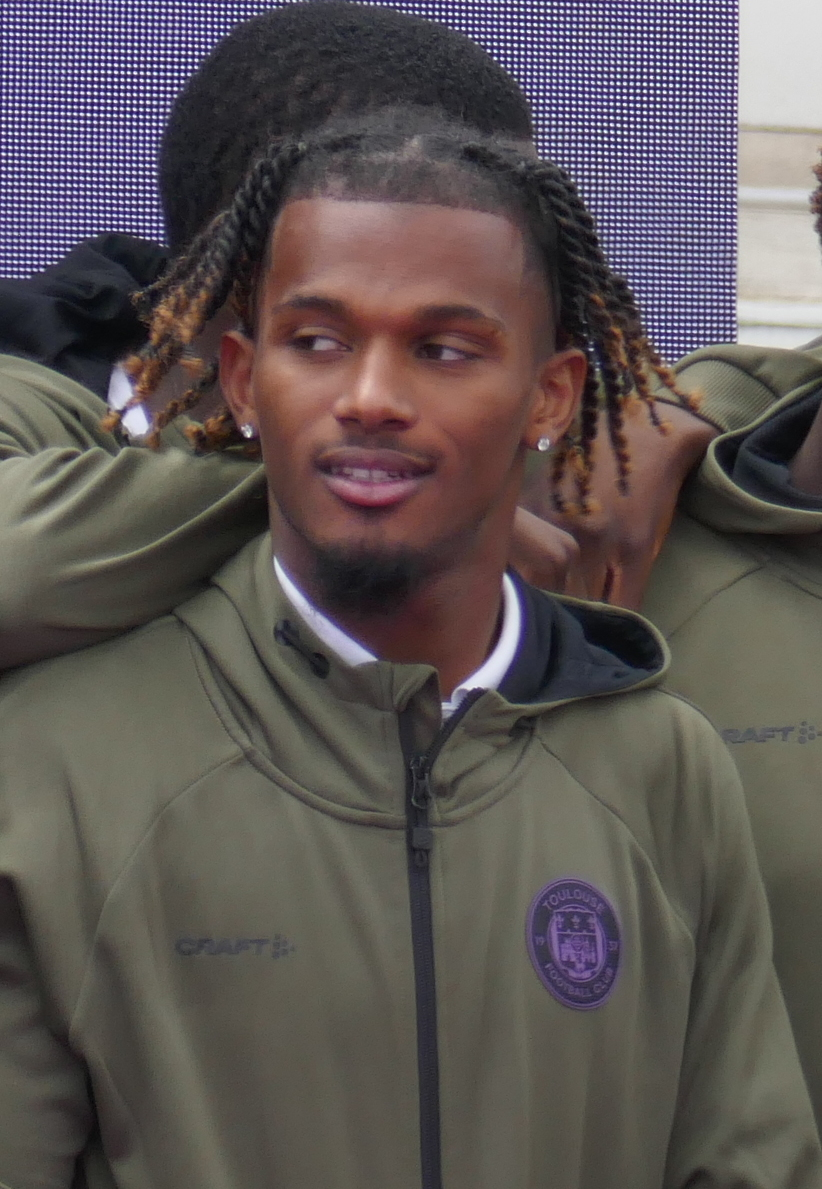
- Gboho with Toulouse in 2024

Personal information
- Full name: Gnantin Yann-Alexandre Gboho
- Date of birth: 14 January 2001 (age 25)
- Place of birth: Man, Ivory Coast
- Height: 1.78 m (5 ft 10 in)
- Position: Attacking midfielder

Team information
- Current team: Coventry City
- Number: 34

Youth career
- 2010–2013: Aiglon du Lamentin
- 2013–2016: Rouen
- 2016–2018: Rennes

Senior career*
Years	Team	Apps	(Gls)
2018–2019	Rennes II	19	(4)
2019–2022	Rennes	18	(1)
2021–2022	→ Vitesse (loan)	17	(2)
2022–2024	Cercle Brugge	49	(3)
2024–2026	Toulouse	81	(16)
2026–	Coventry City	3	(1)

International career^{‡}
2016–2017	France U16	12	(5)
2017–2018	France U17	12	(2)
2018	France U18	3	(0)
2026–	Ivory Coast	2	(1)
- * Club domestic league appearances and goals as of 8 November 2026 ‡ National team caps and goals as of 8 November 2026

Gnantin Yann-Alexandre Gboho (born 14 January 2001) is an Ivorian professional footballer who plays as an attacking midfielder or left winger for Premier League club Coventry City and the Ivory Coast national team.

== Club career ==
=== Rennes ===
On 24 May 2018, Gboho signed his first professional contract with Rennes. He made his debut for the club in the 2019 Trophée des Champions, losing 2–1 to Paris Saint-Germain on 3 August 2019. He scored his first Ligue 1 goal on 27 October 2019, a stoppage time winner in a 3–2 home victory over Toulouse.

==== Vitesse (loan) ====
On 22 July 2021, Gboho joined Vitesse in the Netherlands on loan.

=== Cercle Brugge ===
On 19 August 2022, Gboho signed a three-year contract with Cercle Brugge in Belgium.

=== Toulouse ===
On 8 January 2024, Gboho returned to France, joining Ligue 1 side Toulouse for a reported fee of €2.5 million.

=== Coventry City ===
On 4 September 2026, Gboho joined newly promoted Premier League club Coventry City for a fee in the region of £10.3 million. While the move was agreed prior to the 1 September deadline, it required ratification from FIFA before being confirmed on 4 September.

== International career ==
On 16 September 2026, Gboho was included in the Ivory Coast national team squad by newly appointed head coach Hervé Renard, marking his first call-up under Renard.

He made his debut against Somalia in the second matchday of the 2027 Africa Cup of Nations qualification campaign. Coming on as a substitute, he replaced Franck Kessié in the 83rd minute and scored his first goal for Ivory Coast in the 89th minute, giving his side a 1–0 lead. Ivory Coast went on to win the match 2–0.

== Career statistics ==
=== International ===
As of match played 29 September 2026

Appearances and goals by national team and year
National team	Year	Apps	Goals
Ivory Coast	2026	1	1
Total		1	1

As of match played 29 September 2026
Ivory Coast score listed first, score column indicates score after each Gboho goal.

List of international goals scored by Yann Gboho
No.	Date	Venue	Opponent	Score	Result	Competition
1	29 September 2026	Felix Houphouet Boigny Stadium, Abidjan, Ivory Coast	Somalia	1–0	2–0	2027 Africa Cup of Nations qualification

== Personal life ==
Gboho's uncle, Ambroise, is also a professional footballer, as are his cousins, Guéla and Désiré Doué.
