= Anthony Ribelin =

French footballer (born 1996)

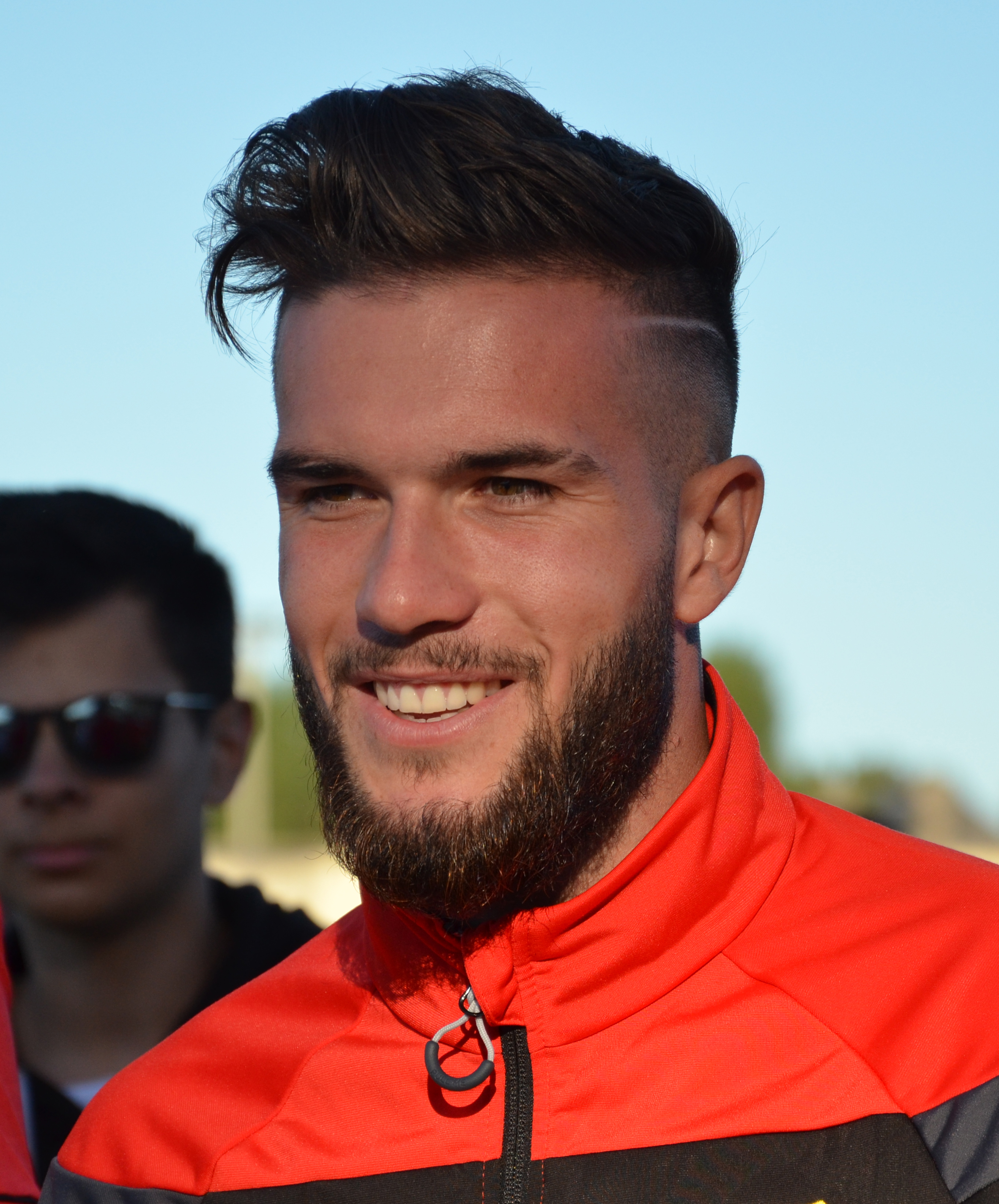

Personal information
- Date of birth: 8 April 1996 (age 30)
- Place of birth: Nîmes, France
- Height: 1.77 m (5 ft 10 in)
- Position: Midfielder

Team information
- Current team: Amiens
- Number: 12

Youth career
- 2002–2006: Gallia C. Gallarguois
- 2006–2014: Montpellier

Senior career*
| Years | Team | Apps | (Gls) |
| 2014–2016 | Montpellier II | 34 | (3) |
| 2014–2016 | Montpellier | 8 | (0) |
| 2016–2018 | Rennes | 0 | (0) |
| 2017 | → Paris FC (loan) | 13 | (3) |
| 2018 | → L'Entente SSG (loan) | 5 | (0) |
| 2018–2019 | Marseille Endoume | 21 | (0) |
| 2019–2023 | Bourg-en-Bresse | 97 | (4) |
| 2023–2026 | Le Mans | 75 | (2) |
| 2026– | Amiens | 0 | (0) |

International career
| 2012 | France U16 | 2 | (0) |
| 2014–2015 | France U19 | 3 | (0) |
- * Club domestic league appearances and goals as of 11 May 2026

Anthony Ribelin (born 8 April 1996) is a French professional footballer who plays as a midfielder for Ligue 3 club Amiens.

== Club career ==
Born in Nîmes, Ribelin played football from the age of five, first with local club GC Gallarguois, and then with Montpellier. From the age of 17 he was playing for the B team in Championnat de France Amateur 2. He signed a professional youth contract at the age of 18, and made his debut for the first team in the Ligue 1 game against Bordeaux on 9 August 2014. In May 2016, after eight Ligue 1 appearances, he signed his first full professional contract with the club.

A change of coach led Ribelin to leave Montpellier and sign a three-year deal with Rennes in June 2016. Ribelin played games for the B team at Rennes, but did not make the breakthrough into the first team, and in January 2017 he was loaned to Paris FC for the remainder of the 2017–18 season. In January 2018 he was loaned again to L'Entente SSG/

After leaving Rennes, Ribelin spent the 2018–19 season in Championnat National 2 with US Marseille Endoume before joining Football Bourg-en-Bresse Péronnas 01 in July 2019.

On 5 June 2025, Ribelin signed a three-year contract with Amiens in Ligue 3.
