= Riffi Mandanda =

Footballer (born 1992)

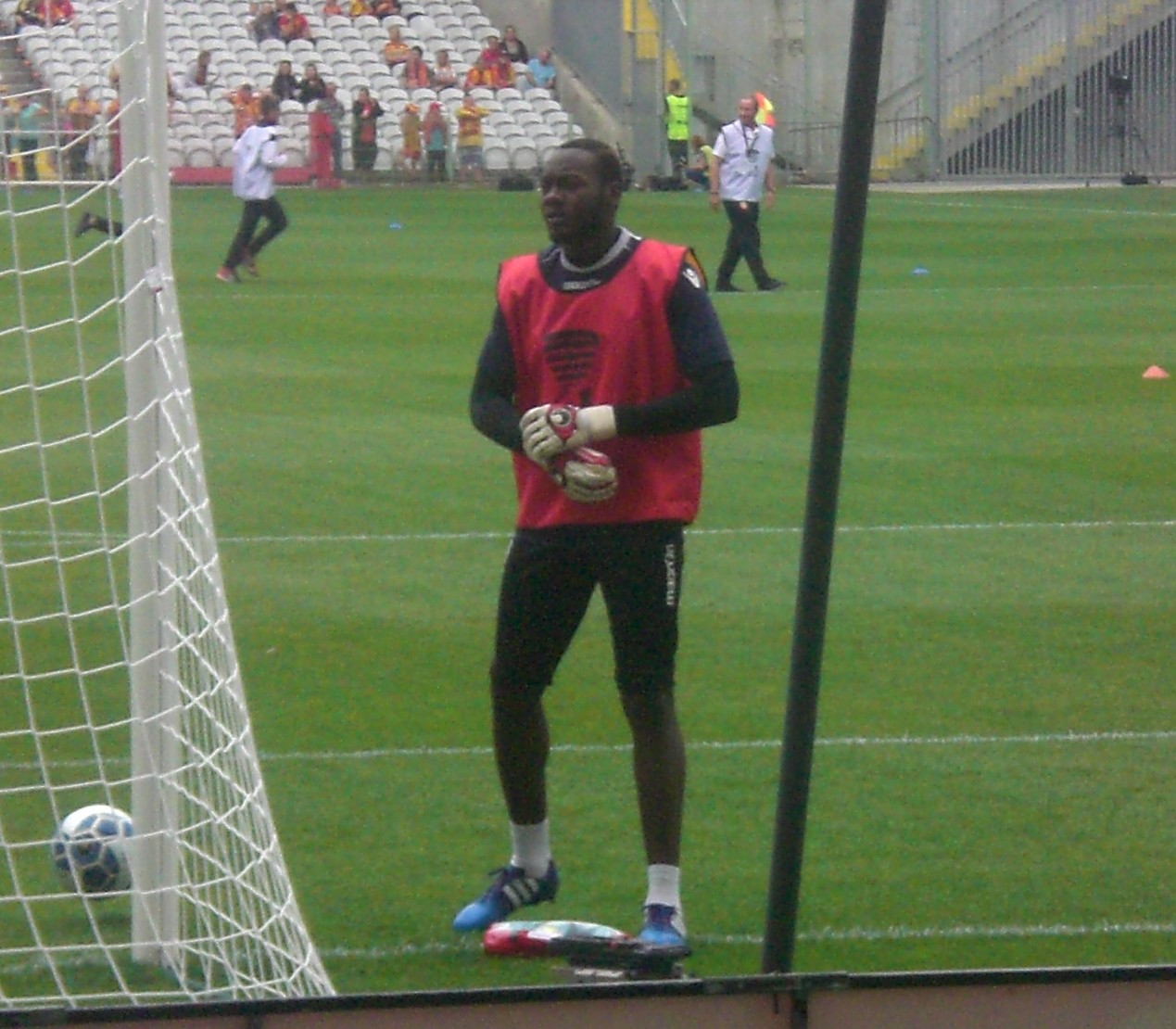
- Mandanda with Ajaccio in 2015

Personal information
- Date of birth: 11 October 1992 (age 34)
- Place of birth: Evreux, France
- Height: 1.85 m (6 ft 1 in)
- Position: Goalkeeper

Senior career*
Years	Team	Apps	(Gls)
2010–2015	Caen B	7	(0)
2011–2012	→ Tarbes (loan)	27	(0)
2012	→ Poiré-sur-Vie (loan)	0	(0)
2012	→ Poiré-sur-Vie B (loan)	7	(0)
2013	→ Compiègne (loan)	20	(0)
2013–2014	→ Uzès Pont du Gard (loan)	13	(0)
2015–2017	Ajaccio B	5	(0)
2015–2018	Ajaccio	55	(0)
2018–2020	Boulogne	47	(0)
2020	Rennes	0	(0)
2020	Kongsvinger	16	(0)
2021–2022	Créteil	28	(0)
Total		225	(0)

International career
2009-2010	France U18	5	(0)
2010	France U19	1	(0)
2013	DR Congo U20	4	(0)
- * Club domestic league appearances and goals

Riffi Mandanda (born 11 October 1992) is a former professional footballer who played as a goalkeeper. Born in France, he is a former youth international for France and DR Congo.

== Club career ==
Mandanda is a youth product of Caen, though he was never offered a spot in the club's first team. After making his debut in the French lower divisions on loans, Mandanda joined Ajaccio in 2015, as a backup for Anthony Scribe. He made his full professional debut a few months later, in a 3–0 Ligue 2 defeat against Nancy.

In February 2020, Mandanda joined Rennes on a contract until the end of the 2019–20 season. He left the club at the expiration of his contract in summer 2020.

On 7 September 2020, Mandanda signed with Norwegian club Kongsvinger IL that plays in the second tier 1. divisjon. In July 2021, he joined Créteil in the Championnat National.

== International career ==
Mandanda played five matches with the France U18 team and one with the France U19 before playing four matches with Congo DR under-20. In November 2019 he was called up by the DR Congo national team, but did not make the team's roster for 2021 Africa Cup of Nations qualifiers.

== Personal life ==
Mandanda is the younger brother of France international goalkeeper Steve Mandanda and DR Congo international goalkeeper Parfait Mandanda. His younger brother Over Mandanda signed with Ligue 1 club Bordeaux in July 2017.
