= Romain Danzé =

French footballer (born 1986)

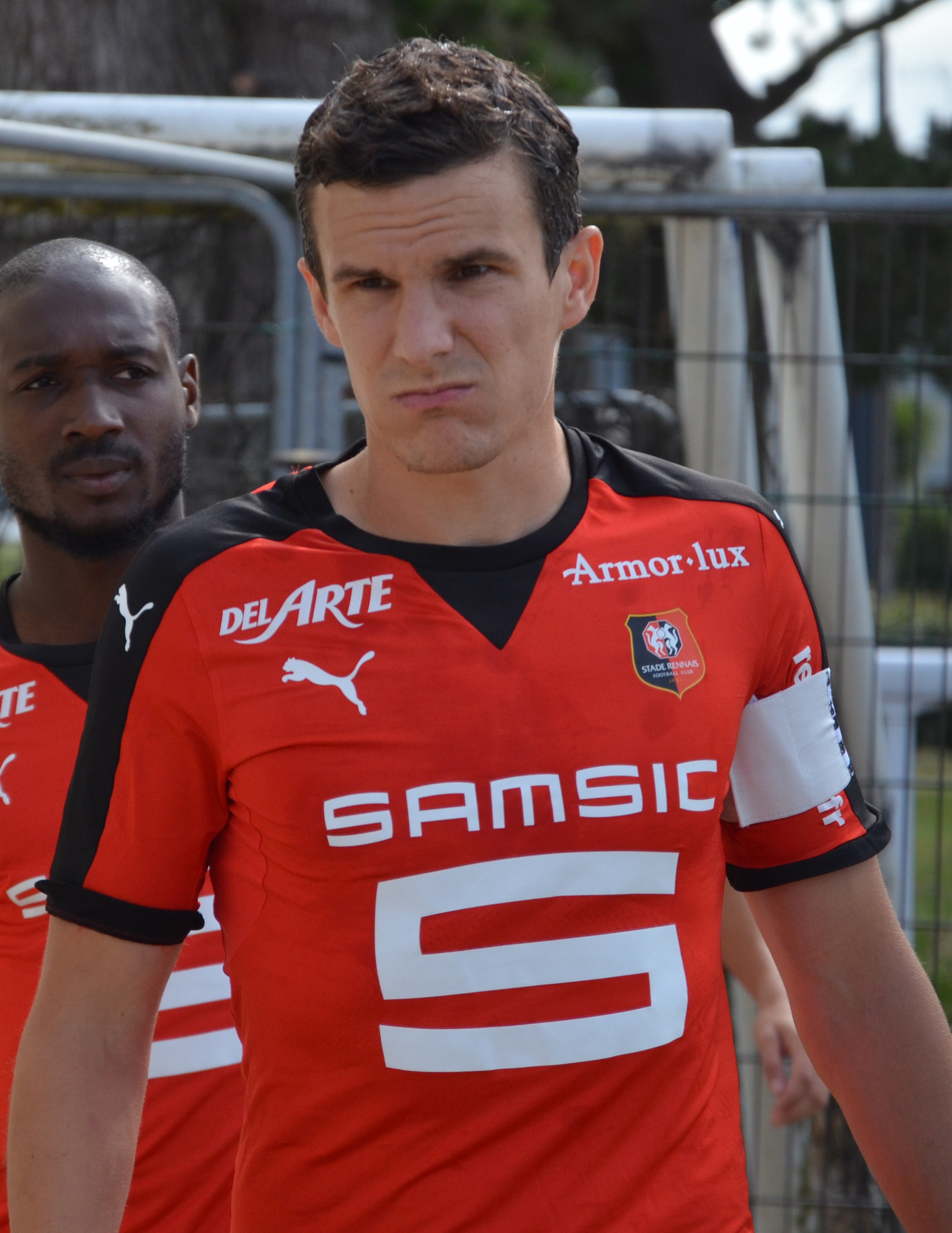
- Danzé with Rennes in 2015

Personal information
- Date of birth: 3 July 1986 (age 40)
- Place of birth: Douarnenez, Finistère, France
- Height: 1.84 m (6 ft 0 in)
- Position: Right-back

Youth career
- 2000–2006: Rennes

Senior career*
Years	Team	Apps	(Gls)
2006–2019	Rennes	323	(8)

International career
2008	France U21	4	(0)
- * Club domestic league appearances and goals

Romain Danzé (born 3 July 1986) is a French former professional footballer who spent his entire career with Ligue 1 club Rennes. He played as a right-back, but could also play as a midfielder or left-back.

Danzé spent his entire career at with Rennes in Ligue 1 and made 377 appearances and scoring ten times in all competitions. Following his retirement, he announced his intention to earn his coaching badges.

== Club career ==
=== Early life and early career ===
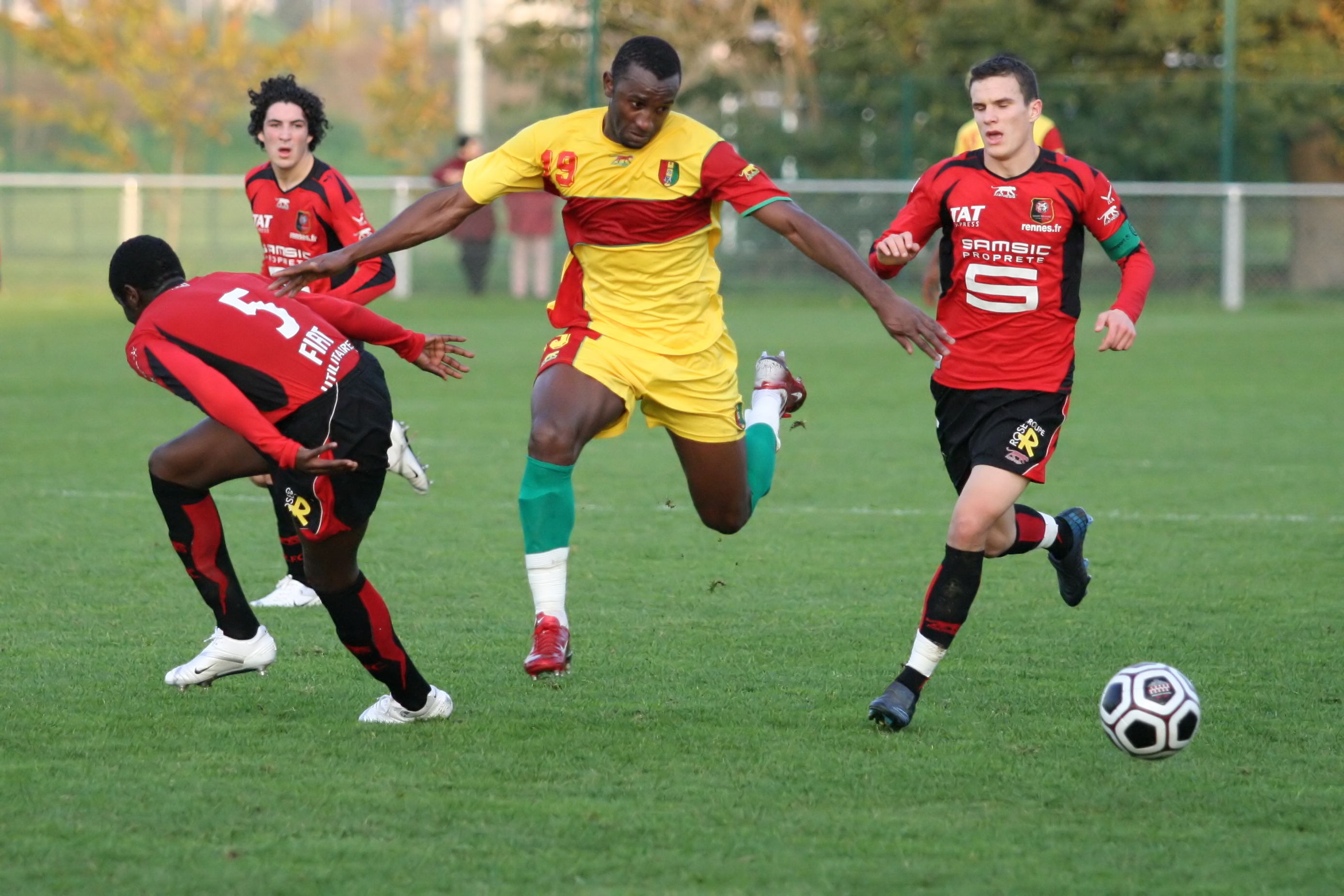
Danzé attempt to chase a ball from Kamil Zayatte in a friendly match in November 2006.

Danzé was born on 3 July 1986 in Douarnenez, Finistère. He grew up in Pouldergat and began his football career when he joined Gourlizon Sports at six years old in October 1992 and his father, Jean-Yves, was working. Danzé quickly excelled at Gourlizon Sports that his performance attracted interests from Rennes, Auxerre, AS Monaco and FC Nantes. Ultimately, he joined Stella Maris Douarnenez at age thirteen. Danzé also trained at PEF Ploufragan, a regional academy located in the Brittany region that trained players similarly to the Clairefontaine academy in the Île-de-France. However, his football career was threatened when he was diagnosed with Osgood–Schlatter disease. But Danzé managed to overcome from his injury.

Danzé arrived at the Rennes Academy in 2001 after they invited to a trial and impressed the side. Although he played as a defender, Danzé began to play in the midfield position. At one point, Danzé was the captain for the reserve side. He initially was a regular fixture for the Rennes reserves playing in the CFA team, but was later plagued with injuries. Despite this, Danzé signed his first professional contract in the summer of 2006.

=== Rennes ===
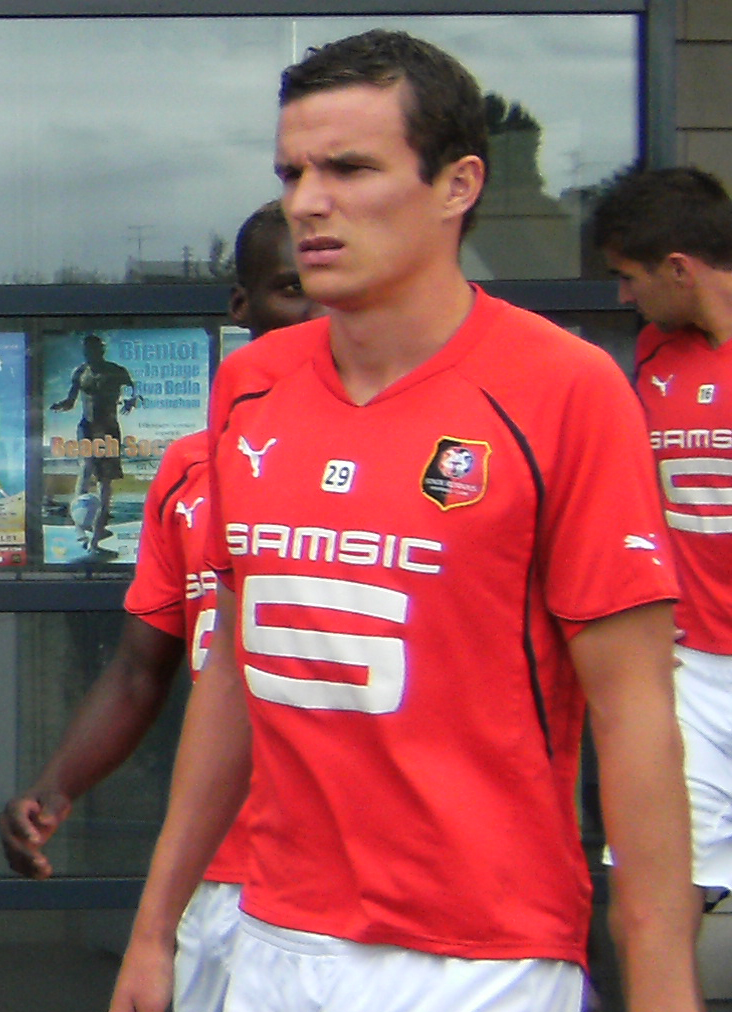
Danzé pictured before a friendly match between Rennes and SM Caen in Ouistreham.

Danzé was involved in the club's first team throughout the summer of 2006 pre–season friendly. He made his Stade Rennais debut on 24 October 2006, starting a match and played 80 minutes as they won 2–0 against Lille OSC in the Round of 16 of the Coupe de la Ligue. Danzé made his Ligue 1 debut on 4 November 2006, coming on as a substitute in a 1–0 win against champions Olympique Lyonnais. A month later, in Rennes' final league match on 23 December 2006, he made his first Ligue 1 start for the club in a 0–0 draw with local rivals Lorient. Following this, Danzé received a handful of first team football for the side, playing in the right–back position. He then scored his first goal for the club, in a 1–0 win against Valenciennes on 27 January 2007. After the match, Manager Pierre Dréossi said: "As for Romain Danzé, he is an efficient player who puts in a lot of effort and knows how to seize his chance." For his performance, it was announced on 2 April 2007 that Danzé signed a three–year contract with the club, with an option of extension. At the end of the 2006–07 season, he made twenty–one appearances and scoring once in all competitions.

However, during the club's pre–season, Danzé ruptured his anterior cruciate ligament of the left knee that kept him out at the start of the 2007–08 season. He made his first appearance of the season on 11 August 2007, starting at right–back in a 0–0 draw against Marseille. But Danzé continued to recover from his anterior cruciate ligament of the left knee for the rest of the year. He returned to the first team in late January 2008 as a second-half substitute in a 1–1 draw against FC Metz. Danzé spent the next two months on the substitute bench since returning from injury. But he later regained his first team place, playing in the right–back position for the remaining matches of the season. At the end of the 2007–08 season, Danzé made eleven appearances in all competitions.

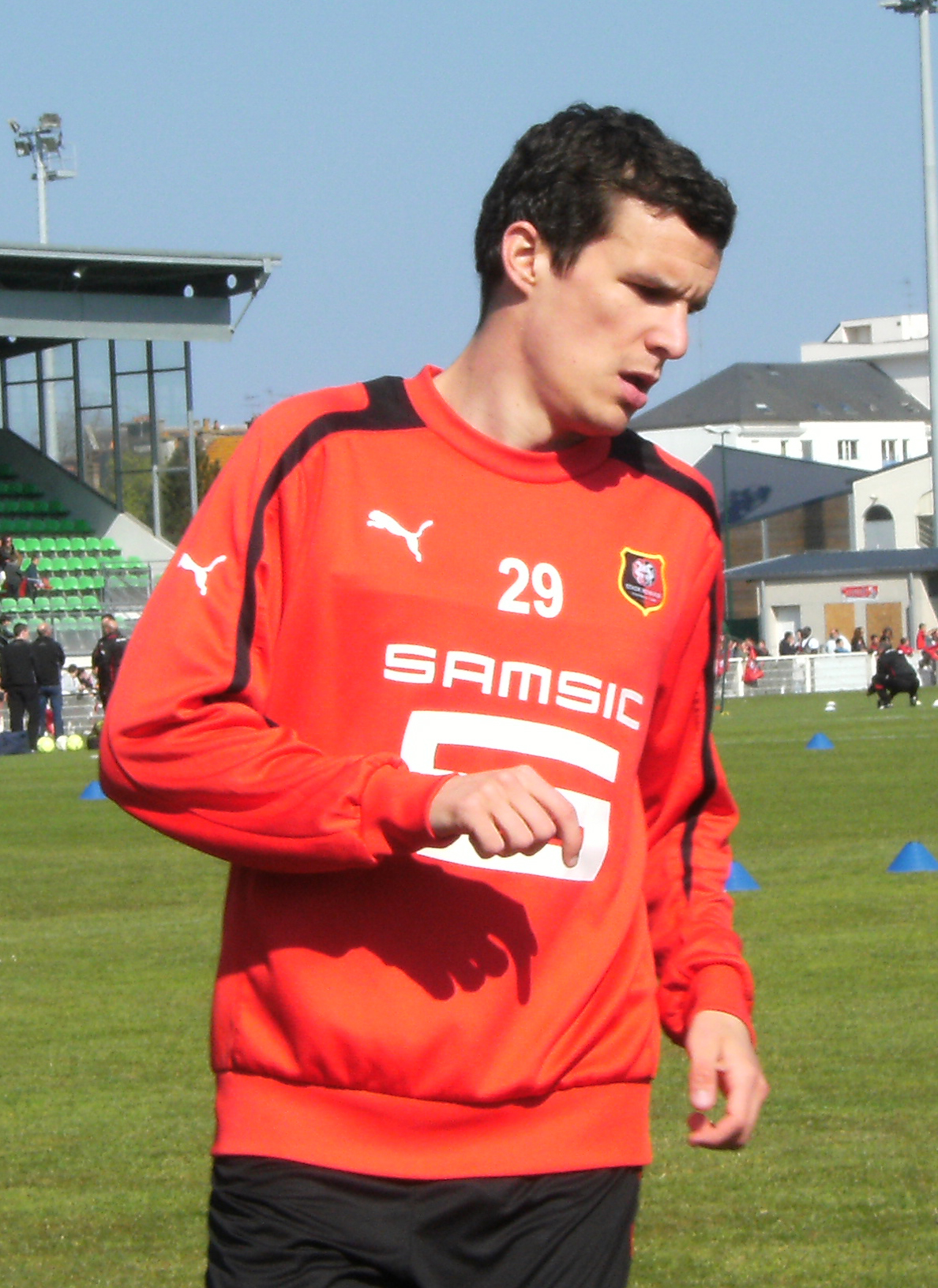
Danzé pictured during training Marville stadium in Saint-Malo on 3 May 2013.

Ahead of the 2008–09 season, Danzé was linked a move away from Stade Rennais, with a possible loan move, but stayed at the club. Danzé played in both legs of the UEFA Intertoto Cup third round against Tavriya Simferopol and helped the side progressing to the next round after they won 10–9 on penalty shoot–out and were among several players to successfully converted in the shoot–out. At the start of the season, Danzé began to rotate in different positions, playing in either the right–back position and right–midfield position. Danzé then played in both legs of the UEFA Cup, as the club were eliminated on a 2–2 draw on aggregate, resulting in their elimination through away goal. His performance at the club led to him signing a contract extension, keeping him until 2012. He scored his first goal of the season and set up the third goal of a 3–0 win against FC Lorient in the Round of 16 of Coupe de France on 4 March 2009. Danzé then scored his second goal of the season in a 1–0 win against Saint-Étienne on 11 April. His third goal of the season came on 29 April in a 3–2 loss against Bordeaux. A week later on 9 May 2009, he started and played 79 minutes in the final of Coupe de France, as the club lost 2–1 against Guingamp. Despite being sidelined on two occasions during the 2008–09 season, Danzé made thirty–seven appearances and scoring three times in all competitions.

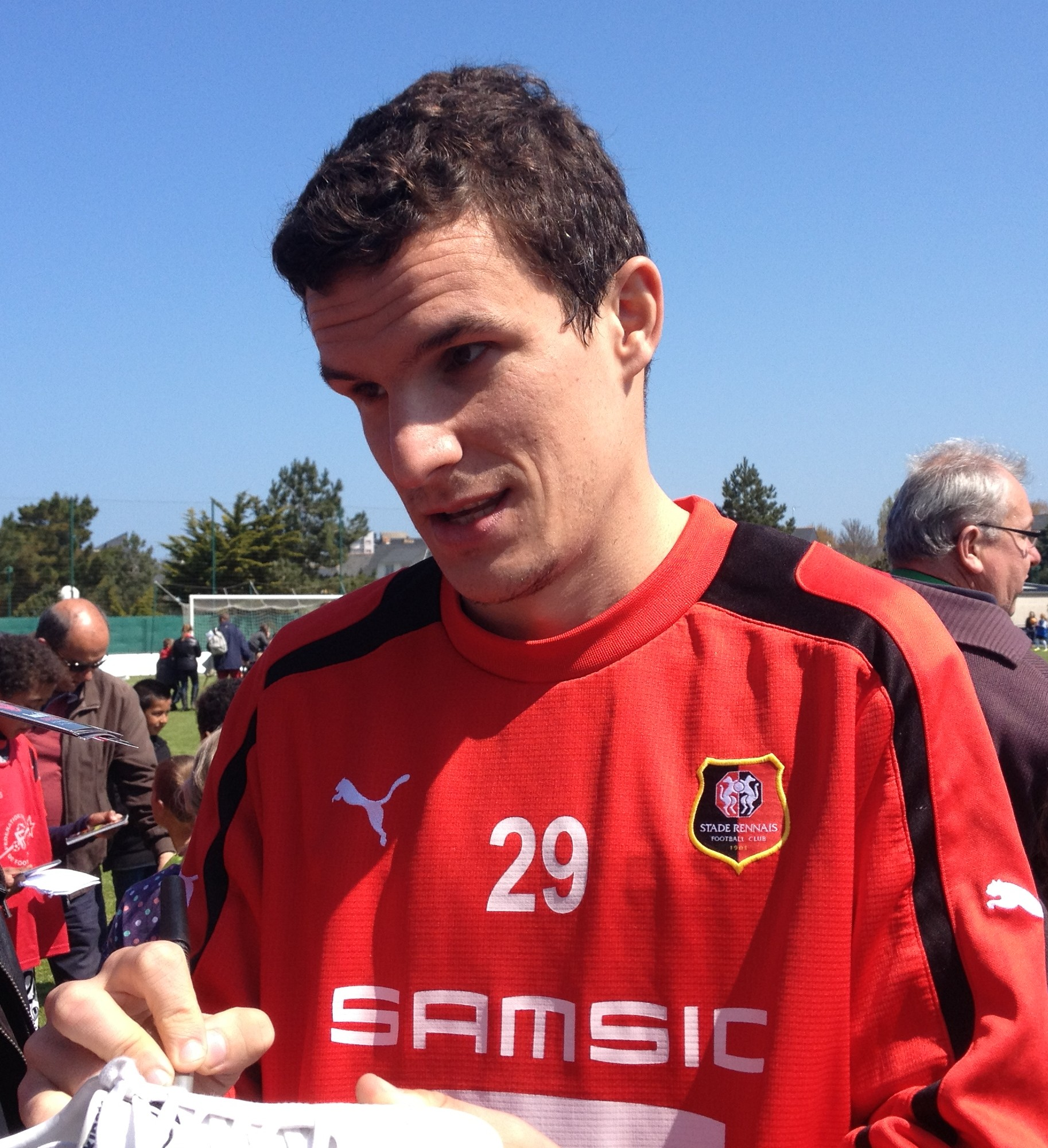
Danzé signing autographs for the fans during a training session at Stade Rennes at the Marville stadium in Saint-Malo on 3 May 2013.

At the start of the 2009–10 season, Danzé found himself appearing from the substitute bench in a number of matches. Instead, Danzé regained his first team place in the starting eleven by playing in the left–back position, a position he did not feel comfortable playing at, preferring to play in the right–back position. At times, Danzé played in the right–back position and once in the right–midfield position. Despite this, he responded to a question on his reflection to the first half of the 2009–10 season, saying: "I have 10 tenures in the league, 17 games played plus one in the League Cup. I am quite satisfied with the playing time. I asked myself some questions at the start of the season but it proves that you have to know how to wait for your turn. As long as I'm playing, I'm happy." He scored his first goal of the season on 23 September 2009 in a 2–1 win against Sochaux in the fourth round of the Coupe de la Ligue. Danzé's second goal of the season came in a 4–0 win against Grenoble Foot 38 on 30 January 2010. He then made his 100th appearance for the Stade Rennais, coming on as a 70th-minute substitute, in a 4–1 win against Toulouse on 20 March 2010. Danzé's third goal of the season came on 10 April 2010, in a 1–1 draw against FC Lorient. At the 2009–10 season, he went on to make nineteen appearances and scoring three times in all competitions.

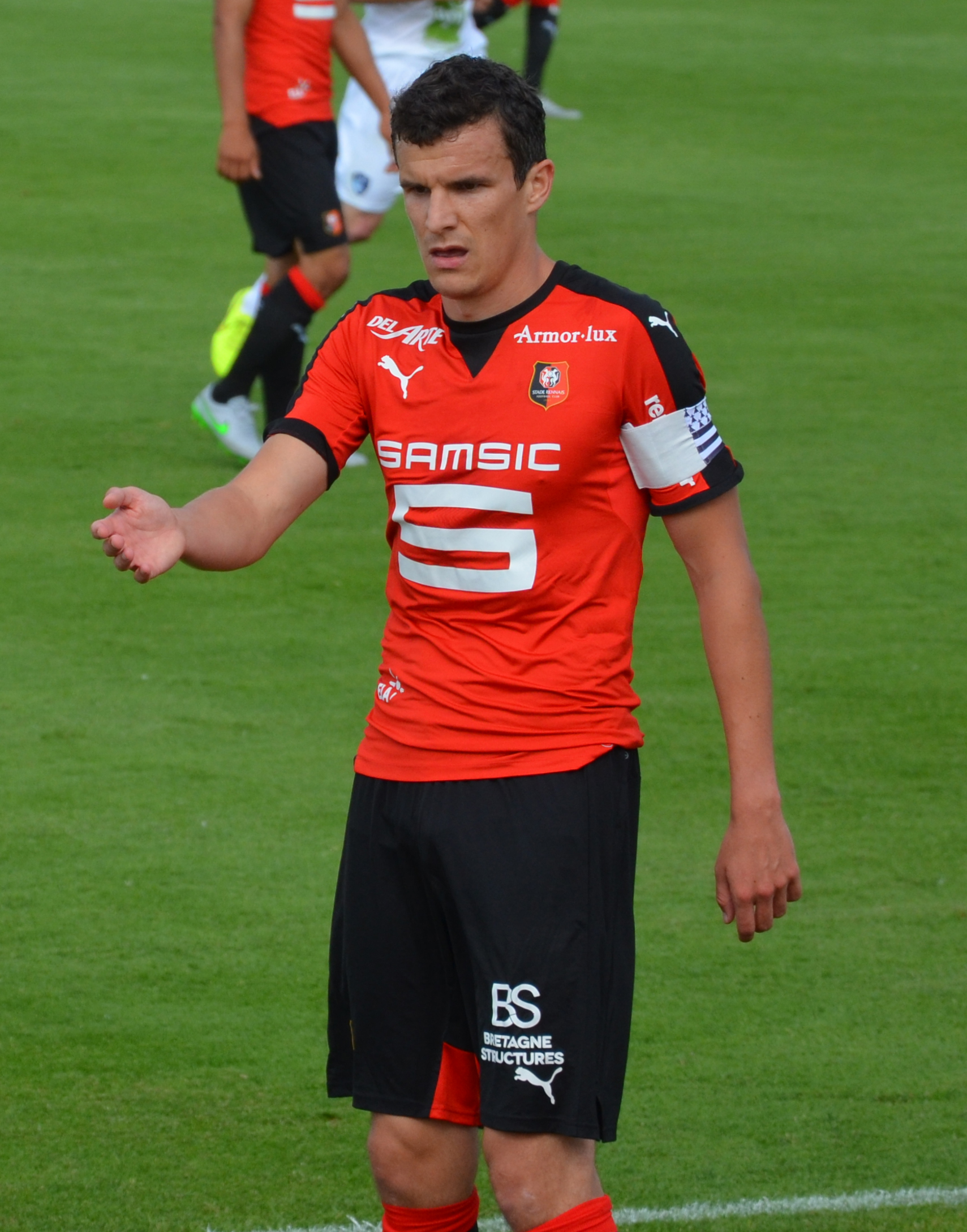
Danzé pictured during a friendly match against Le Havre on 8 July 2015.

Ahead of the 2010–11 season, Danzé signed a contract with Stade Rennais, keeping him until 2013. It came after when his future at the club was uncertain. At the start of the 2010–11 season, he established himself in the starting eleven, playing in the right–back position following the departure of Rod Fanni. Although Danzé played in the right–back position for most of the season, he played in the right–midfield position on two occasions. Danzé helped the side keep three consecutive clean sheets between 14 August 2010 and 28 August 2010. He also helped the side go nine league matches without a loss, resulting in the club placing at the top of the table. He scored his first goal of the season on 4 October 2010 in a 3–1 win against Toulouse. A month later against Lyon on 6 November 2010, Danzé captained the side for the first time and helped them draw 1–1. Danzé, once again, helped the side keep four consecutive clean sheets between 1 December 2010 and 18 December 2010. In a match against AC Arles-Avignon on 15 January 2011, he set up the club's first goal of the game, in a 4–0 win. Despite facing injuries during the 2010–11 season, Danzé played in every league match, as he made forty–one appearances and scoring once in all competitions.

At the start of the 2011–12 season, Danzé played all four matches of the UEFA Europa League Qualifying Round to reach the knockout stage by beating FC Rustavi and Red Star Belgrade. In the first leg of the UEFA Europa League Play–Off Round, he made his 150th appearance for Stade Rennais, in a 2–1 win. In the opening game of the season against Dijon, Danzé set up the club's fifth goal of the game, in a 5–1 win. He continued to established himself in the starting eleven, playing in the right–back position. Around the same time, Danzé has been rotating being placed in the substitute bench, as he found himself compete with Kévin Théophile-Catherine and Dimitri Foulquier over the right–back position. In late–October, Danzé suffered a knee injury that resulted in him missing one match. He returned to the starting line–up, starting the whole game, in a 1–1 draw against Valenciennes on 6 November 2011. A month later on 10 December 2011, Danzé scored his first goal of the season, in a 1–1 draw against Stade Brestois 29. Danzé captained the side when he helped the side win 5–4 on penalty shoot–out against OGC Nice in second round of the Coupe de France on 21 January 2012 and were among several players to successfully converted in the shoot–out. His 150th appearance for Stade Rennais came on 24 March 2012, starting the whole game, in a 1–0 loss against Valenciennes. Ironically, three days prior on 21 March 2012, the club beat Valenciennes 3–1 to reach the semi–finals of the Coupe de France. Danzé then set up two goals in two matches between 7 April 2012 and 16 April 2012 against Évian and OGC Nice. However, during a 2–0 loss against Bordeaux on 2 May 2012, he suffered a thigh injury and was substituted in the 43rd minute, resulting in him missing two matches. In the last game of the season against Dijon, Danzé returned to the starting line–up and set up the club's fifth goal of a 5–0 win. During the 2011–12 season, he made 44 appearances and scored once in all competitions.

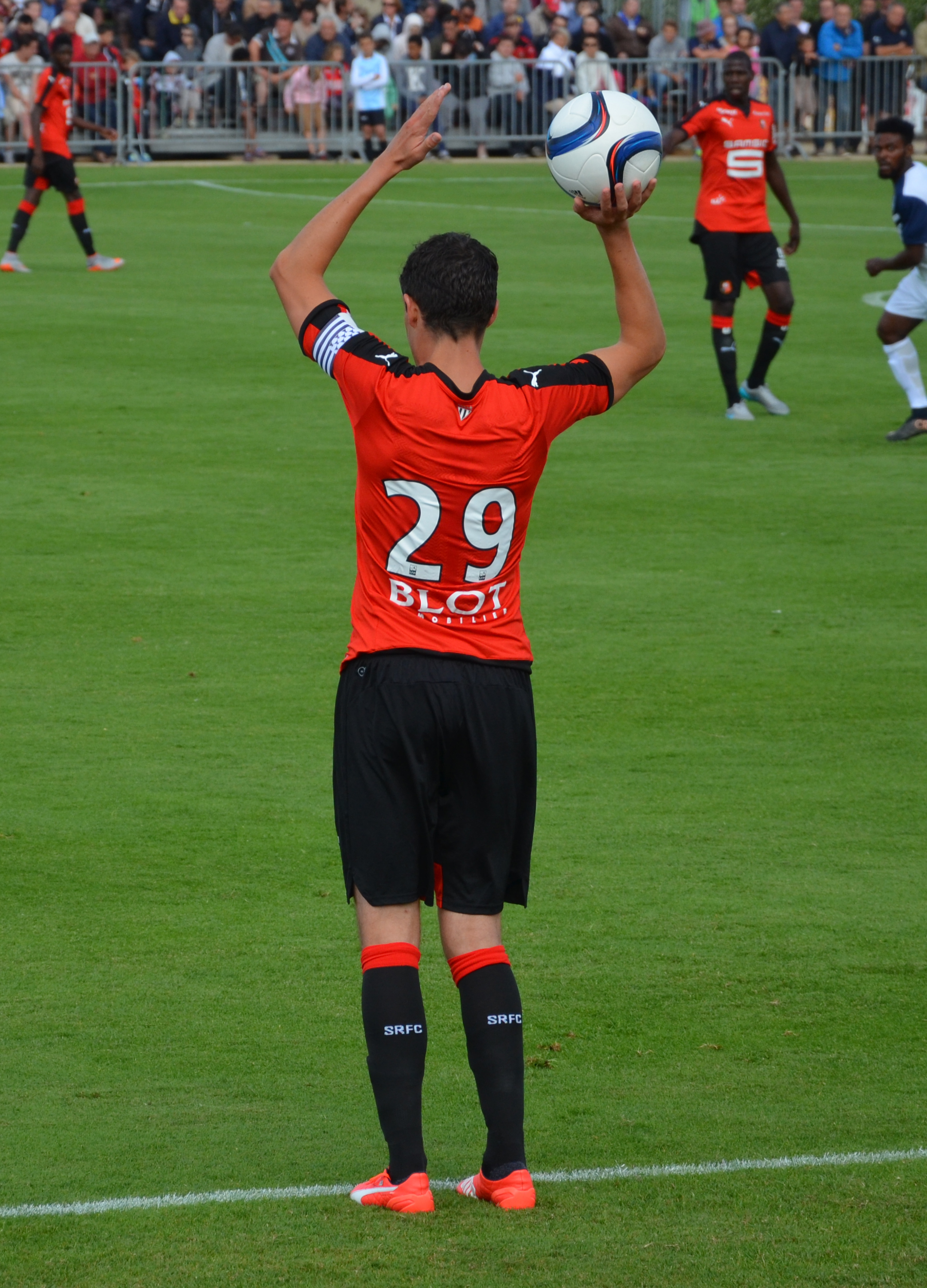
Danzé preparing to take a thrown in during a friendly match against Le Havre on 8 July 2015.

It was announced on 5 July 2012 that Danzé signed a three–year contract with Stade Rennais, keeping him until 2016. He was permanently appointed as the new captain of the club following the departure of Kader Mangane ahead of the 2012–13 season. At the start of the 2012–13 season, Danzé continued to established himself in the starting eleven, playing in the right–back position, and retaining his captaincy role. Due to continuous competitions in the right–back position, Danzé rotated in different positions, playing in either the defensive midfield position and right–midfield position. He then made his 200th appearance for the club, coming against Saint-Étienne on 26 October 2012, as they lost 2–0. Shortly after, Danzé suffered an illness that kept him out for one match. He made his return to the starting line–up, in a 1–0 win against Stade de Reims on 3 November 2012. Danzé continued to remain in the first team since returning from injury for the next three months. This lasted until mid–February when he suffered a thigh injury that saw him miss one match. He scored his first goal of the season on 8 March in a 2–2 draw against Saint-Étienne. Danzé appeared in the next six matches before he suffered a hamstring injury. Despite being on the sidelines, he did start in the Coupe de la Ligue Final against Saint-Étienne and played 57 minutes before being substituted, as the club lost 1–0. Following this, Danzé was sidelined with a hamstring injury for the second time. He returned to the starting line–up on 18 May in a 1–1 draw against AC Ajaccio. At the end of the 2012–13 season, he made thirty–seven appearances and scoring once in all competitions.

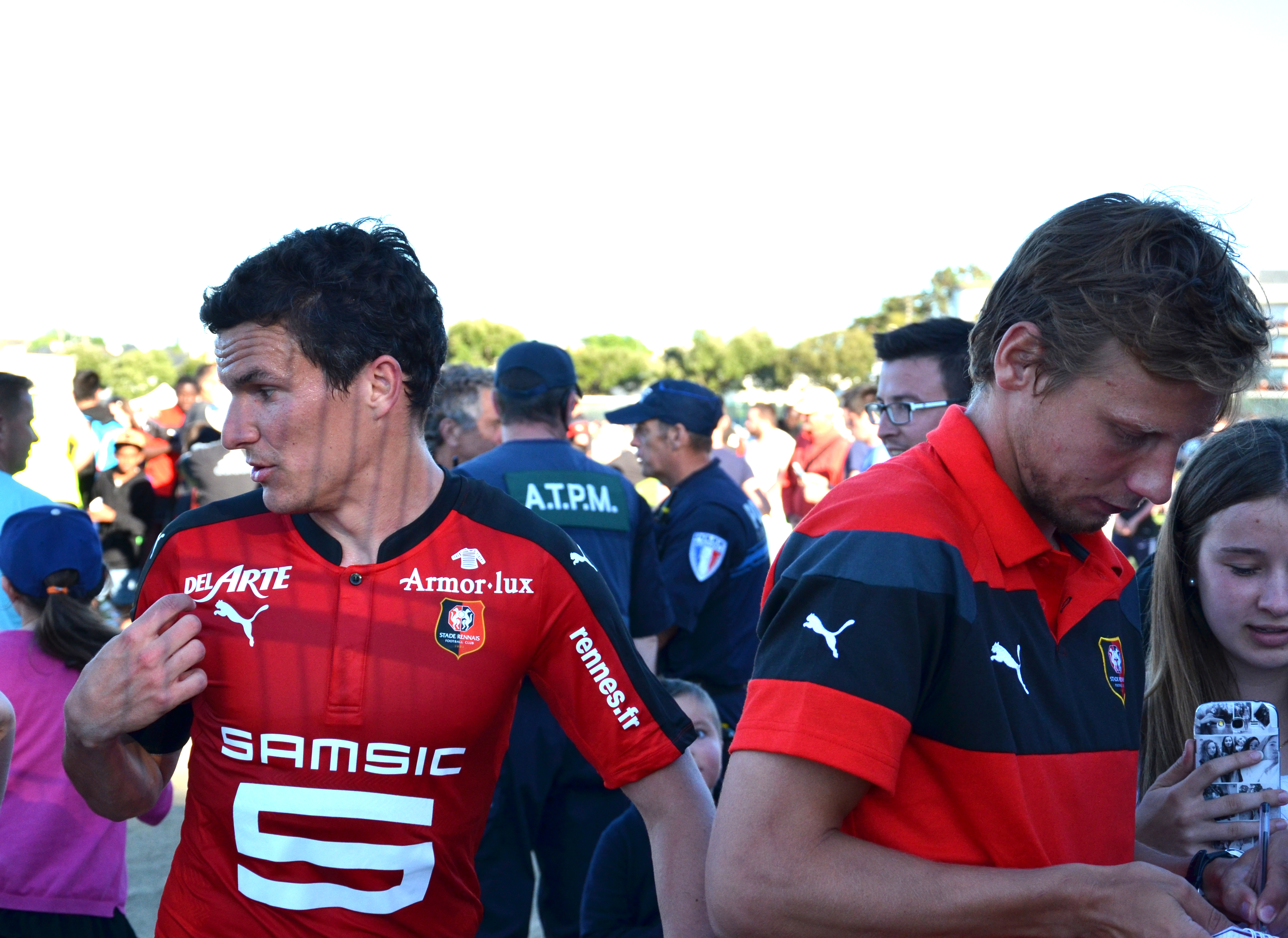
Danzé pictured with Clément Chantôme interacting with the club's supporters prior to a friendly match between Stade Rennes and USM Alger on 16 July 2016.

At the start of the 2013–14 season, Danzé continued to establish himself in the starting eleven, playing in the right–back position, and retaining his captaincy role. He helped Stade Rennais keep four consecutive clean sheets between 31 August 2013 and 26 September 2013. During a 2–0 loss against Guingamp on 5 October 2013, Danzé suffered a clash to a head and was substituted as a result. But he made his return to the starting line–up, in a 2–2 draw against Valenciennes on 19 October 2013. Three months later on 4 January 2014 against Valenciennes in the first round of Coupe of France, Danzé helped the side win 8–7 in the penalty shoot–out and were among several players to successfully converted in the shoot–out. Since the start of the 2013–14 season, Danzé started in every match until he suffered a knee injury in mid–February that saw him miss one match. Danzé returned to the starting line–up against Montpellier on 15 February 2014 and helped the side draw 2–2. A month later against Marseille on 18 March 2014, he made his 100th appearance as the club's captain, helping Stade Rennais keep a clean sheet by winning 1–0. However, Danzé suffered a thigh injury that kept him out throughout April. He returned to the starting line–up for the Coupe de France Final against Guingamp, as Stade Rennais lost 2–0 against them for the second time in his career. Danzé later reflected the 2013–14 season as a disappointment, mentioning the defeat in the Coupe de France Final as a factor. Despite this, he finished the season, making forty appearances in all competitions.

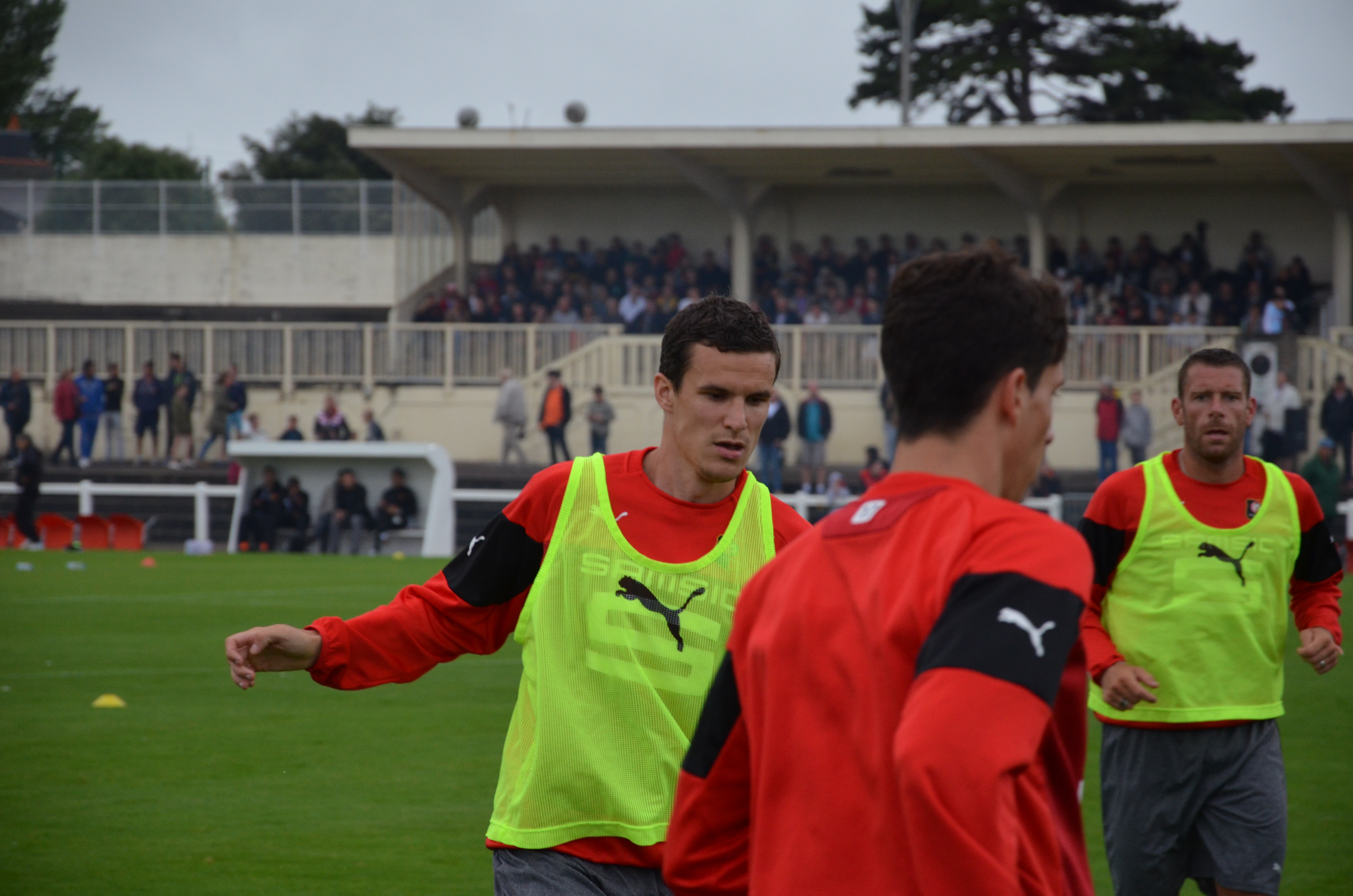
Danzé pictured during training before a friendly match against US Orleans on 6 July 2014.

At the start of the 2014–15 season, Danzé found himself in a new competition with new signing Benjamin André over the midfield position. He started in the opening game of the season, playing in the defensive midfield position, in a 2–0 loss against Lyon. In a follow–up march against Évian, Danzé returned to playing in the right–back position and set up two goals, in a 6–2 win. Following this, he continued to start in the right–back position, and retaining his captaincy role. During a 1–1 draw against Paris Saint-Germain on 14 September 2014, Danzé suffered a black eye from Zlatan Ibrahimović. Despite this, he was named Team of the Week by L'Équipe. For the next two months, Danzé kept six clean sheets out of eight league matches for the side. In the Round of 32 of Coupe of France against Stade de Reims, he helped the side win 5–4 in the penalty shoot–out and were among several players to successfully converted in the shoot–out. However, in the second half of the season, he found himself in and out of the starting line–up, due to Fallou Diagne being preferred in the right–back position, as well as, his own injury concerns. Despite this, Danzé was able to make his 250th league appearance for the club, in a 0–0 draw against FC Nantes on 21 March 2015. He then made his 300th appearance for the club, in a 1–0 loss against SC Bastia on 9 May 2015. At the end of the 2014–15 season, Danzé made thirty–five appearances in all competitions. It was announced on 29 May 2015 that he signed a contract with the club, keeping him until 2019.

At the start of the 2015–16 season, Danzé found himself placed on the substitute bench, due to a competition in the defender and midfielder positions. He made his first appearance of the season on 13 September 2015 as an 83rd-minute substitute in a 2–0 win against Nantes. A week later, Danzé started as captain and set up the equalising goal in a 1–1 draw against Gazélec Ajaccio. He then spent two months away from the starting line–up, being placed on the substitute bench. Danzé returned to the starting line–up in early December and played the whole of a 1–1 draw with Saint-Étienne. However, during a match against OGC Nice on 4 January 2016 in the first round of Coupe de France, Danzé was sent–off in the 115th minute, as Stade Rennais went on to win 7–6 in penalty shoot–out after the match was played 120 minutes with a 2–2 draw. After the match, he served a two match suspension. After returning from suspension, he played as right–back and captain for the remaining matches of the 2015–16 season. Danzé then made his 150th appearance as the club's captain, helping Stade Rennais win 1–0 against Angers SCO on 12 February 2016. He also rotated in playing in the left–back position and defensive midfield position for the remaining two matches of the season. At the end of the 2015–16 season, Danzé made twenty–four appearances in all competitions.

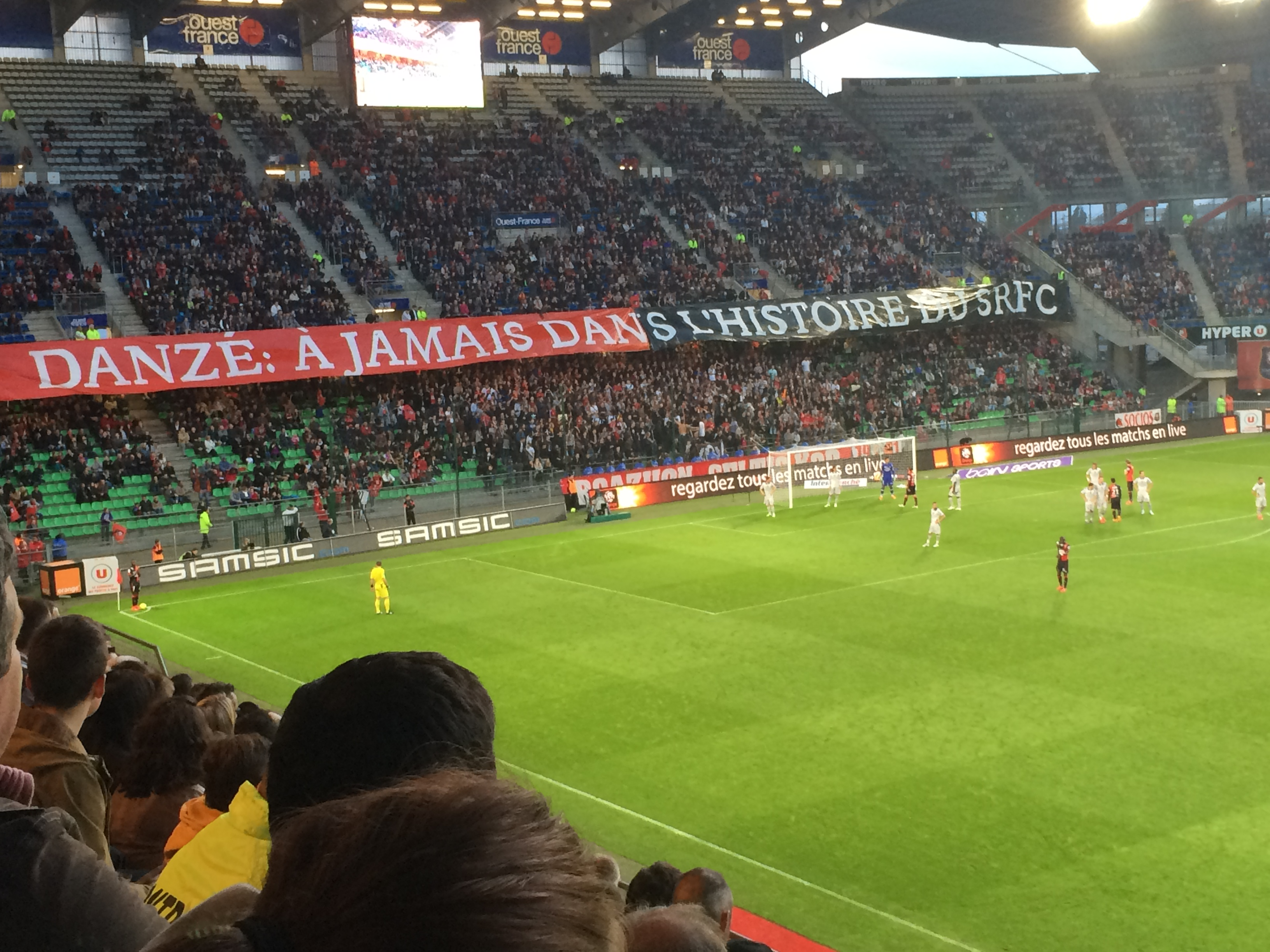
For his 300th appearance for Stade Rennais, the club's supporters deployed a banner across Roazhon Park above the caption: "Danzé: a jamais dans l'histoire dd SRFC.

Ahead of the 2016–17 season, Danzé was linked a move away from Stade Rennais, with Guingamp and Saint-Étienne were interested in signing him but he stayed at the club. At the start of the 2016–17 season, Danzé made his first appearance of the season against AS Nancy and set up the club's first goal of the game, in a 2–0 loss. After the match, his performance was praised by Manager Christian Gourcuff, saying: "Roman is reliability, tactically and technically. He is precious for his analytical skills." For his performance, he was named L'Équipe Team of the Week and earned another one in the next two matches. Since the start of the 2016–17 season, Danzé regained his first team place, playing in the right–back position. On 5 December 2016, he made his first appearance of the season, in a 2–0 win against Saint-Étienne. Since the start of the 2016–17 season, Danzé started in every league match until he suffered a knee injury that kept him out for two matches. Danzé returned to the starting line–up on 29 April 2017 in a 2–0 loss against SC Bastia. He made 36 appearances in all competitions over the 2016–17 season.

At the start of the 2017–18 season, Danzé found himself placed on the substitute bench, with his first team opportunities limited in both the defence and midfield positions. He also relinquished his captaincy to Benjamin André over the midfield position when not in the squad. Danzé made his first appearance of the season and captained the side, in a 2–1 win against Dijon in the third round of the Coupe de la Ligue on 25 October 2017. A week later on 3 November 2017 against Bordeaux, he made his first league appearances, coming on as a 55th-minute substitute, in a 1–0 win. Following an injury of Hamari Traoré, who dispatched Danzé in the right–back position earlier in the 2017–18 season, he regained his first team place for the side, playing in either the right–back and left–back positions. In a 2–2 draw against SM Caen on 17 February 2018, Danzé surpassed René Cédolin's appearances, making him the second most capped player in club history. At the end of the 2017–18 season, he made fifteen appearances in all competitions.

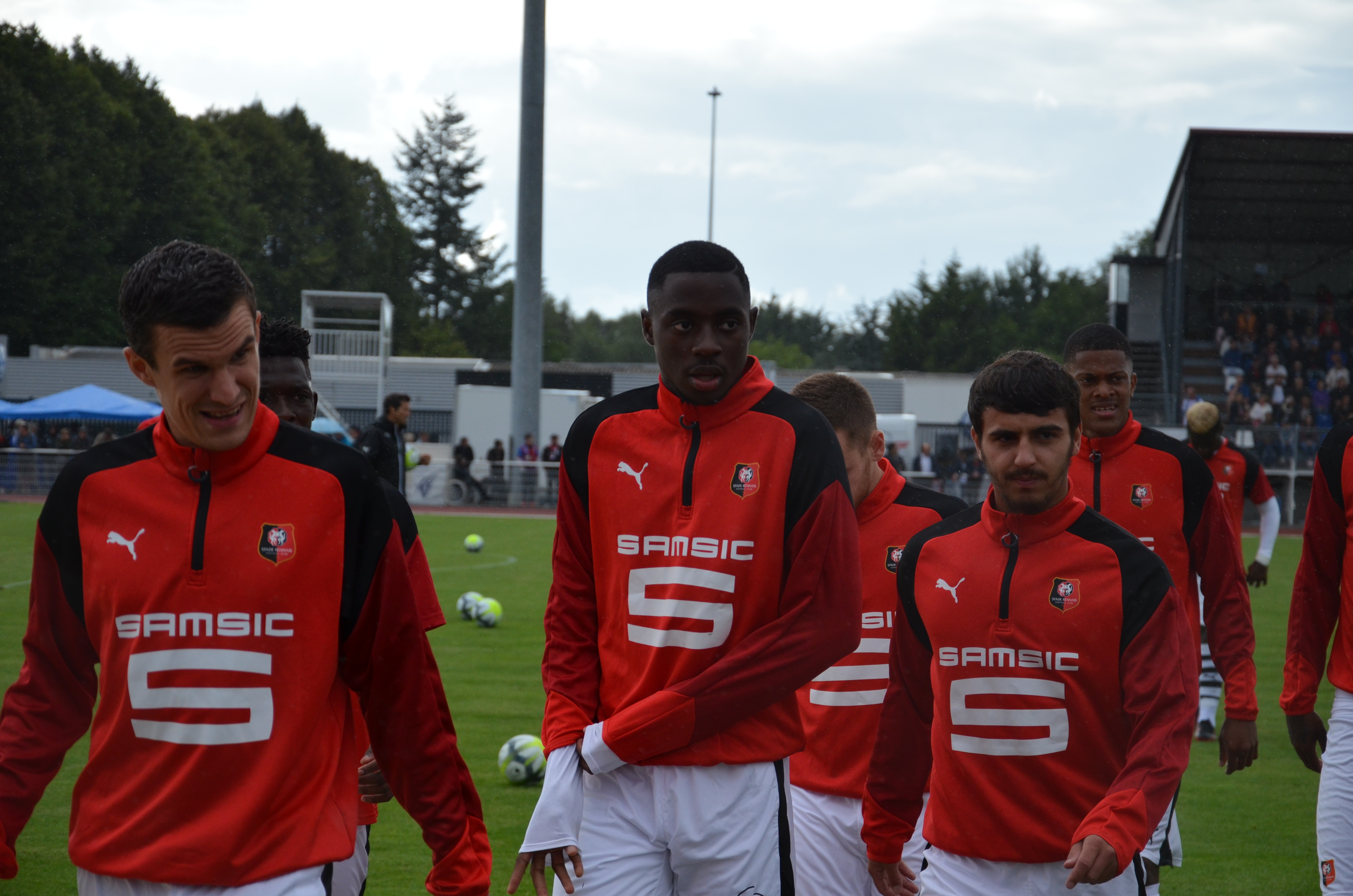
Danzé pictured with James Léa Siliki, Sabri Toufiqui and Jordan Tell finishing warming up prior to a friendly match between Rennes and SM Caen.

At the start of the 2018–19 season, Danzé continued to find his first team place limited, appearing as an unused substitute. However, Danzé had an operation on his knee, which he sustained during a warm up prior to a match against FC Astana in the UEFA Europa League match and ruled him for the rest of the 2018–19 season, making no appearances for the side. It was announced on 24 May 2019 that Danzé would be retiring from professional football, due to injury. Upon learning from his retirement, the club's supporters paid tribute to him by giving him a farewell sent off with his face plastered across Roazhon Park above the caption: “Your name will remain engraved for eternity. Danzé said in an interview on the club's website: "This relationship will be one of the good memories. She quickly settled in with them. At the start, I was the little Breton from the training center who joined the pro group. Contact with supporters was simple, whether at the stadium or elsewhere. The supporters didn't necessarily see me as a player. I arrived at the club, I was 13 years old, I will soon be 33. I have spent more than half of my life in Red and Black. I spent more time at La Piverdière than in my main residence. Stade Rennais FC is my life."

== Post-playing career ==
Shortly after his retirement from professional football, Stade Rennais announced they would retire Danzé's number twenty–nine in honour of his career at the club.

Danzé said after announcing his retirement, he announced his intention to earn a coaching badge in hopes of becoming a Manager. Danzé became an assistant manager to Jean-Fabien Peslier for the club's U17 side. Around the same time, he was among several retired footballers to enrol at the university master's training of general manager of professional sports club of the CDES.

== International career ==
In May 2007, Danzé was called up to the France U20 squad for the Toulon Tournament. He made his France U20 debut, starting the whole game, in a 2–0 win against Ivory Coast on 31 May 2007. Danzé later helped France U20 reach the Toulon tournament final and started in the final, as they won 3–1 against China.

In May 2008, Danzé was called up to the France U21 for the first time. However, he withdrew from the squad, due to an injury. Three months later, Danzé was called up to the under-21 side once again. He made his first appearance for the under-21 side, starting the whole game, in a 2–2 draw against Slovakia U21 on 20 August 2008. Danzé later made three more matches for the under-21 side.

== Personal life ==
In February 2013, Danzé was awarded Pro Rennais Sportsman of 2012. Two years later in May 2015, he was awarded Ballon d'eau fraîche after being voted by fans. Growing up, he supported Rennes. Outside of football, Danzé said: "I got into golf and got hooked. I did not think elsewhere. My golf, my computer, and my console. I'm a real geek. To get out, you have to make the effort to adapt." He is good friends with his former teammate, Benoît Costil, even going as far as naming him his personal choice of his starting eleven.

It was announced on the club's website that Danzé became a first time father when his wife gave birth to a daughter, Tania, on 31 July 2013. In December 2014, he invested in a restaurant in Lamennais, near Place de la République, in Rennes.

== Career statistics ==
Appearances and goals by club, season and competition
Club	Season	League			Cup (Note: Includes in Coupe de France, Coupe de la Ligue, Trophée des Champions)		Continental (Note: Includes UEFA Cup/UEFA Europa League)		Total	
Club	Season	Division	Apps	Goals	Apps	Goals	Apps	Goals	Apps	Goals
Rennes	2006–07	Ligue 1	20	1	1	0	—		21	1
Rennes	2007–08	Ligue 1	9	0	1	0	—		10	0
Rennes	2008–09	Ligue 1	26	2	5	1	4	0	35	3
Rennes	2009–10	Ligue 1	32	2	4	1	—		36	3
Rennes	2010–11	Ligue 1	38	1	3	0	—		41	1
Rennes	2011–12	Ligue 1	32	1	5	0	7	0	44	1
Rennes	2012–13	Ligue 1	32	1	5	0	—		37	1
Rennes	2013–14	Ligue 1	35	0	5	0	—		40	0
Rennes	2014–15	Ligue 1	31	0	4	0	—		35	0
Rennes	2015–16	Ligue 1	21	0	3	0	—		24	0
Rennes	2016–17	Ligue 1	35	0	1	0	—		36	0
Rennes	2017–18	Ligue 1	12	0	3	0	—		15	0
Rennes	2018–19	Ligue 1	0	0	0	0	0	0	0	0
Career total			323	8	40	2	11	0	374	10

== See also ==
- List of one-club men
