= 2009–10 Stade Rennais FC season =

Rennes
2009–10 season
- President: Frédéric de Saint-Sernin
- Head coach: Frédéric Antonetti
- Stadium: Stade de la Route de Lorient
- Ligue 1: 9th
- Coupe de France: Round of 16 vs. Quevilly
- Coupe de la Ligue: Round of 16 vs. Lille
- Top goalscorer: League: Asamoah Gyan (7); All: Asamoah Gyan (7)
- Highest home attendance: 28,631 vs. Marseille, 22 Aug, Ligue 1
- Lowest home attendance: 9,317 vs. Sochaux, 23 Sep, Coupe de la Ligue
Home colours	Away colours	Third colours

The 2009–10 season was the 109th season in the existence of Stade Rennais FC and the club's 15th consecutive season in the top flight of French football. In addition to the domestic league, Angers participated in this season's edition of the Coupe de France and the Coupe de la Ligue. The season covered the period from 1 July 2009 to 30 June 2010.

== Club ==
=== Coaching staff ===
Position	Staff
Manager	(France) Frédéric Antonetti
Assistant manager	(France) Jean-Marie De Zerbi
First team coach	(France) Laurent Huard
Goalkeeping coach	(France) Christophe Revel
Youth team coach	(France) Régis le Bris
Fitness coach	(France) Nicolas Dyon
Physiotherapist	(France) Frédéric Bidel
Club doctor	(France) Karl Chaory
Chief scout	(France) Pierrick Hiard

Last updated: 18 October 2009

=== Kit ===
Supplier: Puma
Sponsor(s): Samsic

Last updated: 18 October 2009.

=== Other information ===
Chairman	(France) Frédéric de Saint-Sernin
Ground (capacity and dimensions)	Route de Lorient (31,127 / unknown)

Updated to match played 18 October 2009

== Players ==
=== Squad information ===
N	Pos.	Nat.	Name	Age	EU	Since	App	Goals	Ends	Transfer fee	Notes
1	GK	(France)	Douchez	46	EU	2008	44	0	2011>	undisclosed	
12	DF	(France)	Fanni	44	EU	2007	78	2	2011	undisclosed	
5	DF	(Senegal)	Mangane	43		2008	35	0	2012	undisclosed	
3	DF	(United States)	Bocanegra	47		2008	43	1	2011	Free	
13	DF	(Sweden)	Hansson	49	EU	2007	90	2	2010	undisclosed	
7	MF	(France)	Leroy	52	EU	2007	74	10	2010	undisclosed	
18	MF	(France)	Lemoine	39	EU	2007	61	2	2013	Youth system	
17	MF	(France)	M'Vila	36	EU	2009	5	0	2013	Youth system	
10	FW	(Ghana)	Gyan	40		2008	22	5	2012	€8M	
21	FW	(Guinea)	Bangoura	41		2009	5	2	2013	€11M	
8	MF	(France)	Marveaux	40	EU	2006	55	5	2011	Youth system	
29	MF	(France)	Danzé	40	EU	2006	62	3	2012	Youth system	
23	FW	(Senegal)	Sow	40	EU	2004	71	15	2010	Youth system	
20	FW	(France)	Ekoko	38		2006	30	2	2010	Youth system	
14	MF	(France)	Cheyrou	48	EU	2006	12	9	2010	undisclosed	
6	MF	(Japan)	Inamoto	46		2009	4	0	2011	Free	
25	DF	(Republic of the Congo)	Aubey	42		2008	13	0	2011	undisclosed	
4	MF	(Norway)	Tettey	40	EU	2009	2	0	2013	€4M	
9	FW	(France)	Pagis	53	EU	2007	57	18	2010	€1-2M	
11	MF	(France)	Thomert	46	EU	2007	72	10	2010	undisclosed	
2	DF	(Nigeria)	Echiéjilé	38		2007	19	0	2010	undisclosed	
26	DF	(France)	Théophile-Catherine	37	EU	2008	2	0	2012	Youth system	
24	FW	(France)	Badiane	39	EU	2007	5	0	2010	Youth system	
28	MF	(France)	Doumbia	37	EU	2009	1	0	2012	Youth system	

- Last updated: 20 November 2009
- Source: and for contract information
- Ordered by Starting 11, then by appearances this season.

=== Starting 11 ===
No.	Pos.	Nat.	Name	MS	Notes
1	GK	(France)	Douchez	18	
12	RB	(France)	Fanni	19	
5	CB	(Senegal)	Mangane	16	
13	CB	(Sweden)	Hansson	16	
29	LB	(France)	Danzé	17	
7	MF	(France)	Leroy	14	
18	MF	(France)	Lemoine	14	
17	MF	(France)	M'Vila	16	
21	RW	(Guinea)	Bangoura	18	
10	CF	(Ghana)	Gyan	17	
8	LW	(France)	Marveaux	17	

Source: Squad stats and Start formations.
Only competitive matches.
Using the most used start formation.
Ordered by position on pitch (from back right to front left).

=== Appearances and goals ===
				Total				Ligue 1		Coupe de France		Coupe de la Ligue		
N	Pos.	Name	Nat.	GS	App	Gls	Min	App	Gls	App	Gls	App	Gls	Notes
1	GK	Douchez	(France)	14	14		1260	13				1		
12	DF	Fanni	(France)	13	13		1170	13						
5	DF	Mangane	(Senegal)	13	13	5	1101	12	4			1	1	
3	DF	Bocanegra	(United States)	10	12		880	12						
13	DF	Hansson	(Sweden)	10	10		900	10						
25	DF	Aubey	(Republic of the Congo)	4	4		360	3				1		
2	DF	Echiéjilé	(Nigeria)	1	1		90					1		
26	DF	Théophile-Catherine	(France)	1	1		90	1						
17	MF	M'Vila	(France)	10	11		890	10				1		
18	MF	Lemoine	(France)	10	10		851	10						
7	MF	Leroy	(France)	10	10	2	842	10	2					
8	MF	Marveaux	(France)	9	11	3	706	11	3					
29	MF	Danzé	(France)	5	12	1	608	11				1	1	
14	MF	Cheyrou	(France)	5	7		501	6				1		
4	MF	Tettey	(Norway)	4	6		346	5				1		
6	MF	Inamoto	(Japan)	3	5		284	5						
28	MF	Doumbia	(France)		1		21					1		
10	FW	Gyan	(Ghana)	12	12	7	977	12	7					
21	FW	Bangoura	(Guinea)	9	13	2	771	12	2			1		
23	FW	Sow	(Senegal)	5	10	1	494	10	1					
20	FW	Ekoko	(France)	3	10		427	9				1		
11	FW	Thomert	(France)	2	3		145	2				1		
9	FW	Pagis	(France)	1	3		123	2				1		
24	FW	Badiane	(France)		1		21					1		

Last updated: 23 November
Ordered by starts then appearances by position
0 shown as blank

=== Disciplinary records ===
N	Pos.	Nat.	Name	Yellow card	Second yellow card	Red card	Notes
1	GK	(France)	Douchez	1	0	0	
16	GK	(France)	Luzi	0	0	0	
30	GK	(Senegal)	N'Diaye	0	0	0	
40	GK	(France)	Petit	0	0	0	
2	DF	(Nigeria)	Echiéjilé	0	0	0	
3	DF	(United States)	Bocanegra	2	0	1	
5	DF	(Senegal)	Mangane	2	0	0	
12	DF	(France)	Fanni	2	0	0	
13	DF	(Sweden)	Hansson	1	0	0	
25	DF	(Republic of the Congo)	Aubey	1	0	0	
26	DF	(France)	Théophile-Catherine	0	0	0	
4	MF	(Norway)	Tettey	0	0	0	
6	MF	(Japan)	Inamoto	1	1	0	
7	MF	(France)	Leroy	2	0	0	
8	MF	(France)	Marveaux	1	0	0	
14	MF	(France)	Cheyrou	0	0	0	
17	MF	(France)	M'Vila	1	1	0	
18	MF	(France)	Lemoine	3	0	0	
28	MF	(France)	Doumbia	0	0	0	
29	MF	(France)	Danzé	0	0	0	
9	FW	(France)	Pagis	0	0	0	
10	FW	(Ghana)	Gyan	2	0	0	
11	FW	(France)	Thomert	0	0	0	
19	FW	(France)	Briand	0	0	0	
20	FW	(France)	Ekoko	0	0	0	
21	FW	(Guinea)	Bangoura	3	0	0	
23	FW	(Senegal)	Sow	0	0	0	
24	FW	(France)	Badiane	0	0	0	

Last updated: 23 November
Source: Ligue 1 Matches
Only competitive matches
(yellow card) = Number of bookings; (second yellow card) = Number of sending offs after a second yellow card; (red card) = Number of sending offs by a direct red card.

== Competitions ==
=== Overview ===
Competition	First match	Last match	Starting round	Final position	Record							
Competition	First match	Last match	Starting round	Final position	Pld	W	D	L	GF	GA	GD	Win %
Ligue 1	8 August 2009	15 May 2010	Matchday 1	9th	38	14	11	13	52	41	+11	36.84
Coupe de France	9 January 2010	9 February 2010	Round of 64	Round of 16	3	2	0	1	6	1	+5	66.67
Coupe de la Ligue	23 September 2009	10 January 2010	Third round	Round of 16	2	1	0	1	3	4	−1	50.00
Total					43	17	11	15	61	46	+15	39.53

Source: Soccerway

=== Ligue 1 ===
==== League table ====
Pos	Team	Pld	W	D	L	GF	GA	GD	Pts
7	Lorient	38	16	10	12	54	42	+12	58
8	Monaco	38	15	10	13	39	45	−6	55
9	Rennes	38	14	11	13	52	41	+11	53
10	Valenciennes	38	14	10	14	50	50	0	52
11	Lens	38	12	12	14	40	44	−4	48

Source: Ligue 1
Rules for classification: 1) points; 2) goal difference; 3) number of goals scored.

==== Results summary ====
Overall								Home						Away					
Pld	W	D	L	GF	GA	GD	Pts	W	D	L	GF	GA	GD	W	D	L	GF	GA	GD
38	14	11	13	52	41	+11	53	10	4	5	31	18	+13	4	7	8	21	23	−2

Source: Ligue 1

==== Results by round ====
Round	1	2	3	4	5	6	7	8	9	10	11	12	13	14	15	16	17	18	19	20	21	22	23	24	25	26	27	28	29	30	31	32	33	34	35	36	37	38
Ground	H	A	H	A	H	A	A	H	A	H	H	A	H	A	H	A	A	H	A	H	A	H	H	A	H	A	H	A	H	A	H	A	H	A	H	A	H	A
Result	W	D	D	D	W	W	L	L	D	W	L	L	W	D	W	W	L	W	L	D	D	W	W	L	L	L	W	W	W	W	L	D	D	D	L	L	D	L
Position	2	4	9	10	6	4	5	8	8	8	10	12	10	10	8	7	10	6	9	9	9	8	8	8	9	10	10	8	7	7	7	7	7	7	8	8	9	9

Source: Ligue 1
A = Away; H = Home; W = Win; D = Draw; L = Loss

==== Matches ====
8 August 2009 1	Rennes	3–0	Boulogne	Rennes
21:00 CEST (UTC+2)	Bangoura 7'; Mangane 45'; Mangane (yellow card) 45'; Leroy 90+1'	(Report)		Stadium: Stade de la Route de Lorient; Attendance: 21,462; Referee: Wilfried Bien

16 August 2009 2	Nice	1–1	Rennes	Nice
17:00 CEST (UTC+2)	Echouafni (yellow card) 40'; Ben Saada 44'	(Report)	Inamoto (yellow card) 27'; Gyan 45+1' (pen.); Inamoto (yellow card) 27' (yellow-red card) 77'	Stadium: Stade Municipal du Ray; Attendance: 12,824; Referee: Saïd Ennjimi

22 August 2009 3	Rennes	1–1	Marseille	Rennes
21:00 CEST (UTC+2)	Leroy 37' (pen.); Bangoura (yellow card) 51'	(Report)	Niang 52'; Diawara (yellow card) 64'; Mbia (yellow card) 71'	Stadium: Stade de la Route de Lorient; Attendance: 28,631; Referee: Philippe Malige

29 August 2009 4	Lens	2–2	Rennes	Lens
19:00 CEST (UTC+2)	Demont 21' (pen.); Ramos (yellow card) 27' (yellow-red card) 50'; Demont (yellow card) 59'; Jemâa 73'	(Report)	Bangoura 4'; Mangane (yellow card) 23'; Lemoine (yellow card) 47'; Leroy (yellow card) 59'; M'Vila (red card) 70'; Gyan 90+1'	Stadium: Stade Félix-Bollaert; Attendance: 33,810; Referee: Christian Guillard

13 September 2009 5	Rennes	1–0	Saint-Étienne	Rennes
17:00 CEST (UTC+2)	Bangoura (yellow card) 31'; Leroy (yellow card) 45+1'; Marveaux 62'	(Report)	N'Daw (yellow card) 31'; Landrin (yellow card) 45'	Stadium: Stade de la Route de Lorient; Attendance: 22,009; Referee: Antony Gautier

19 September 2009 6	Grenoble	0–4	Rennes	Grenoble
19:00 CEST (UTC+2)	Mainfroi (yellow card) 40'; Sauget (yellow card) 87'	(Report)	Gyan 1', 61' (pen.); Marveaux 7'; Mangane 20'; Fanni (yellow card) 28'; Bangoura (yellow card) 34'	Stadium: Stade des Alpes; Attendance: 13,154; Referee: Clément Turpin

27 September 2009 7	Bordeaux	1–0	Rennes	Bordeaux
21:00 CEST (UTC+2)	Wendel 24', (yellow card) 57'; Chamakh (yellow card) 85'	(Report)	Lemoine (yellow card) 43'; Gyan (yellow card) 69'	Stadium: Stade Chaban-Delmas; Attendance: 26,811; Referee: Hervé Piccirillo

3 October 2009 8	Rennes	0–1	Auxerre	Rennes
19:00 CEST (UTC+2)	Bocanegra (red card) 16'; Lemoine (yellow card) 35'; M'Vila (yellow card) 68'; Gyan (yellow card) 87'; Aubey (yellow card) 90+1'	(Report)	Pedretti 17'; Capoue (yellow card) 38'; Hengbart (yellow card) 44'; Grichting (yellow card) 52'; Oliech (yellow card) 87'; Mignot (yellow card) 90'	Stadium: Stade de la Route de Lorient; Attendance: 20,378; Referee: Wilfried Bien

17 October 2009 9	Lille	0–0	Rennes	Villeneuve d'Ascq
21:00 CEST (UTC+2)	Emerson (yellow card) 83'; Rami (yellow card) 89'	(Report)	Marveaux (yellow card) 66'	Stadium: Stadium Lille-Metropole; Attendance: 14,409; Referee: Saïd Ennjimi

24 October 2009 10	Rennes	3–0	Montpellier	Rennes
21:00 CEST (UTC+2)	Marveaux 34'; Sow 50'; Gyan 90+4'	(Report)	Spahić (yellow card) 39'; Pitau (yellow card) 48'; Yanga-M'Biwa (yellow card) 53'; Džodić (yellow card) 85'	Stadium: Stade de la Route de Lorient; Attendance: 23,311; Referee: Antony Gautier

1 November 2009 11	Rennes	0–3	Valenciennes	Rennes
17:00 CET (UTC+1)	Bocanegra (yellow card) 56'; Fanni (yellow card) 57'; Douchez (yellow card) 86'	(Report)	Baldé 58'; Ben Khalfallah 78'; Pujol 85'; Biševac (yellow card) 29'	Stadium: Stade de la Route de Lorient; Attendance: 21,675; Referee: Pascal Vileo

8 November 2009 12	Toulouse	3–2	Rennes	Toulouse
17:00 CET (UTC+1)	Sissoko 31'; Braaten 59'; Gignac 63'	(Report)	Gyan 44'; Mangane 84'	Stadium: Stadium Municipal; Attendance: 15,405; Referee: Damien Ledentu

21 November 2009 13	Rennes	2–1	Le Mans	Rennes
19:00 CET (UTC+1)	Mangane 10'; Bocanegra (yellow card) 40'; Hansson (yellow card) 65'; Gyan 81'	(Report)	Lamah 56'; João Paulo (yellow card) 71'	Stadium: Stade de la Route de Lorient; Attendance: 20,292; Referee: Didier Falcone

29 November 2009 14	Lyon	1–1	Rennes	Lyon
21:00 CET (UTC+1)	López 42'	(Report)	Gyan 14'	Stadium: Stade de Gerland; Attendance: 35,978; Referee: Philippe Malige

5 December 2009 15	Rennes	1–0	Lorient	Rennes
21:00 CET (UTC+1)	Sow 3'	(Report)		Stadium: Stade de la Route de Lorient; Attendance: 24,459; Referee: Philippe Kalt

12 December 2009 16	Nancy	1–2	Rennes	Tomblaine
19:00 CET (UTC+1)	Feret 41'; Macaluso (yellow card) 67' (yellow-red card)	(Report)	Traoré 49' (o.g.); Marveaux 70'	Stadium: Stade Marcel-Picot; Attendance: 16,029; Referee: Christian Guillard

16 December 2009 17	Monaco	1–0	Rennes	Monaco
19:00 CET (UTC+1)	Park Chu-Young 20'	(Report)		Stadium: Stade Louis II; Attendance: 5,555; Referee: Laurent Duhamel

19 December 2009 18	Rennes	1–0	Paris Saint-Germain	Rennes
19:00 CET (UTC+1)	Bangoura 40'	(Report)		Stadium: Stade de la Route de Lorient; Attendance: 26,621; Referee: Wilfried Bien

23 December 2009 19	Sochaux	2–0	Rennes	Montbéliard
19:00 CET (UTC+1)	Dalmat 45'; Butin 61'	(Report)	Gyan (red card) 12'	Stadium: Stade Auguste Bonal; Attendance: 10,581; Referee: Didier Falcone

16 January 2010 20	Rennes	1–1	Lens	Rennes
21:00 CET (UTC+1)	Sow 55'	(Report)	Monnet-Paquet 64'; Yahia (red card) 87'	Stadium: Stade de la Route de Lorient; Attendance: 21,187; Referee: Alexandre Castro

19 January 2010 21	Saint-Étienne	0–0	Rennes	Saint-Étienne
21:00 CET (UTC+1)		(Report)		Stadium: Stade Geoffroy-Guichard; Attendance: 21,579; Referee: Clément Turpin

30 January 2010 22	Rennes	4–0	Grenoble	Rennes
19:00 CET (UTC+1)	Danzé 9'; Marveaux 41', 47'; Bangoura 57'		Cianci (red card) 65'	Stadium: Stade de la Route de Lorient; Attendance: 17,515; Referee: Damien Ledentu

6 February 2010 23	Rennes	4–2	Bordeaux	Rennes
21:00 CET (UTC+1)	Marveaux 3'; Briand 17' (pen.); Bangoura 48'; Gyan 78'	[ (Report)]	Gouffran 64'; Wendel 68'	Stadium: Stade de la Route de Lorient; Attendance: 28,006; Referee: Saïd Ennjimi

14 February 2010 24	Auxerre	1–0	Rennes	Auxerre
17:00 CET (UTC+1)	Jeleń 42'			Stadium: Stade de l'Abbé-Deschamps; Attendance: 8,689; Referee: Christian Guillard

21 February 2010 25	Rennes	1–2	Lille	Rennes
21:00 CET (UTC+1)	Leroy 26'		Frau 10'; Aubameyang 89'	Stadium: Stade de la Route de Lorient; Attendance: 20,196; Referee: Pascal Vileo

27 February 2010 26	Montpellier	3–1	Rennes	Montpellier
21:00 CET (UTC+1)	Marveaux 25' 36'; Camara 82'		Briand 70'; Mangane (red card) 90'; Gyan (red card) 90'	Stadium: Stade de la Mosson; Attendance: 15,726; Referee: Olivier Thual

6 March 2010 27	Rennes	1–0	Monaco	Rennes
19:00 CET (UTC+1)	Bocanegra 28'			Stadium: Stade de la Route de Lorient; Attendance: 23,177; Referee: Philippe Malige

14 March 2010 28	Valenciennes	0–2	Rennes	Valenciennes
17:00 CET (UTC+1)	Tiéné (red card) 78'	[ (Report)]	Marveaux 27'; Gyan 39'	Stadium: Stade du Hainaut; Attendance: 11,116; Referee: Bruno Coué

20 March 2010 29	Rennes	4–1	Toulouse	Rennes
19:00 CET (UTC+1)	Hansson 31'; Gyan 35', 46'; Kembo Ekoko 90+1'	[ (Report)]	Braaten 51'	Stadium: Stade de la Route de Lorient; Attendance: 18,865; Referee: Stéphane Lannoy

28 March 2010 30	Le Mans	1–3	Rennes	Le Mans
17:00 CEST (UTC+2)	Dossevi 58'	[ (Report)]	Bangoura 51' (pen.); Briand 74', 86'	Stadium: MMArena; Attendance: 7,749; Referee: Wilfried Bien

3 April 2010 31	Rennes	1–2	Lyon	Rennes
19:00 CEST (UTC+2)	Gyan 15'	[ (Report)]	Bastos 53'; López 61'	Stadium: Stade de la Route de Lorient; Attendance: 28,244; Referee: Olivier Thual

10 April 2010 32	Lorient	1–1	Rennes	Lorient
19:00 CEST (UTC+2)	Diarra 13'	[ (Report)]	Danzé 42'	Stadium: Stade du Moustoir; Attendance: 15,103; Referee: Sébastien Moreira

14 April 2010 33	Rennes	0–0	Nancy	Rennes
19:00 CEST (UTC+2)		[ (Report)]		Stadium: Stade de la Route de Lorient; Attendance: 25,215; Referee: Clément Turpin

17 April 2010 34	Paris Saint-Germain	1–1	Rennes	Paris
21:00 CEST (UTC+2)	Hoarau 64'	[ (Report)]	Leroy 32'	Stadium: Parc des Princes; Attendance: 32,596; Referee: Damien Ledentu

2 May 2010 35	Rennes	1–2	Sochaux	Rennes
17:00 CEST (UTC+2)	Marveaux 83' (pen.)	[ (Report)]	Briand 27' (o.g.); Gavanon 80'	Stadium: Stade de la Route de Lorient; Attendance: 17,265; Referee: Bruno Coué

5 May 2010 36	Marseille	3–1	Rennes	Marseille
21:00 CEST (UTC+2)	Heinze 4'; Niang 76'; González 78'	[ (Report)]	Briand 38'	Stadium: Stade Vélodrome; Attendance: 55,377; Referee: Ruddy Buquet

8 May 2010 37	Rennes	2–2	Nice	Rennes
21:00 CEST (UTC+2)	Leroy 60'; Marveaux 66'	[ (Report)]	Mounier 12'; Faé 77'	Stadium: Stade de la Route de Lorient; Attendance: 22,033; Referee: Pascal Vileo

15 May 2010 38	Boulogne	1–0	Rennes	Boulogne-sur-Mer
21:00 CEST (UTC+2)	Thil 20' (pen.)	[ (Report)]		Stadium: Stade de la Libération; Attendance: 12,015; Referee: Olivier Thual

=== Coupe de France ===
9 January 2010 Round of 64	Rennes	2–0	Caen	Rennes
20:45 CET (UTC+1)	Briand 68'; Bangoura 76'	Report		Stadium: Stade de la Route de Lorient; Attendance: 5,724; Referee: Philippe Malige

22 January 2010 Round of 32	Saumur	0–4	Rennes	Cholet
20:45 CET (UTC+1)		Report	Marveaux 40', 88'; Sow 84', 90+3' (pen.)	Stadium: Stade Omnisports; Attendance: 8,000; Referee: Laurent Duhamel

9 February 2010 Round of 16	Quevilly	1–0	Rennes	Le Petit-Quevilly
20:00 CET (UTC+1)	Beaugrard 44'	Report		Stadium: Stade Robert Diochon; Attendance: 12,000; Referee: Sébastien Moreira

=== Coupe de la Ligue ===
23 September 2009 Round of 32	Rennes	2–1	Sochaux	Rennes
20:45 CEST (UTC+2)	Mangane (yellow card) 67', (goal) 84'; Danzé 74'	(Report)	Boudebouz 68', (yellow card) 75'	Stadium: Stade de la Route de Lorient; Attendance: 9,317; Referee: Laurent Duhamel

10 January 2010 Round of 16	Lille	3–1 (a.e.t.)	Rennes	Villeneuve d'Ascq
19:00 CET (UTC+1)	Rami 40'; De Melo 96'; Hazard 115'	Report	Pagis 59'	Stadium: Stadium Lille-Metropole; Attendance: 8,943; Referee: Ruddy Buquet (Picardy)
