= Carlos Bocanegra =

American soccer player (born 1979)

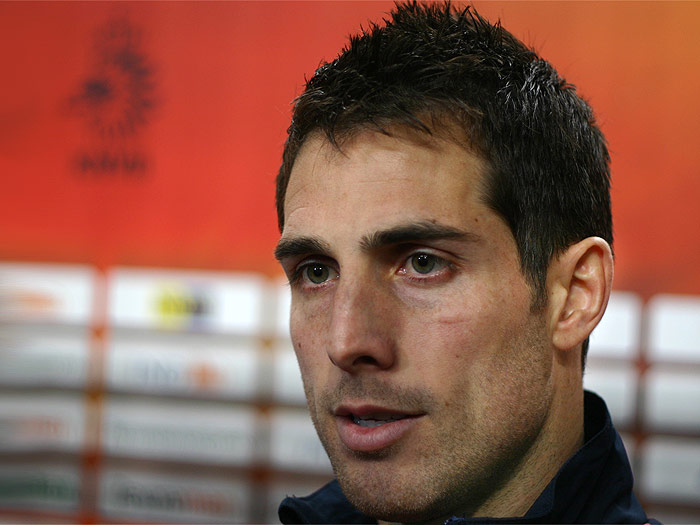
- Bocanegra in 2010

Personal information
- Full name: Carlos Manuel Bocanegra
- Date of birth: May 25, 1979 (age 47)
- Place of birth: Alta Loma, California, U.S.
- Height: 6 ft 0 in (1.83 m)
- Position: Defender

College career
Years	Team	Apps	(Gls)
1997–1999	UCLA Bruins	43	(7)

Senior career*
Years	Team	Apps	(Gls)
2000–2003	Chicago Fire	87	(5)
2000	→ MLS Pro 40 (loan)	2	(0)
2004–2008	Fulham	116	(8)
2008–2010	Rennes	64	(2)
2010–2011	Saint-Étienne	35	(2)
2011–2013	Rangers	32	(2)
2012–2013	→ Racing Santander (loan)	23	(0)
2013–2014	Chivas USA	30	(0)
Total		389	(19)

International career
1999	United States U20	4	(0)
1999–2000	United States U23	7	(1)
2001–2012	United States	110	(14)
Medal record
Representing United States
FIFA Confederations Cup
Runner-up	2009 South Africa	Team
CONCACAF Gold Cup
Winner	CONCACAF Gold Cup	2002
Winner	CONCACAF Gold Cup	2007
Runner-up	CONCACAF Gold Cup	2011
Third place	CONCACAF Gold Cup	2003
Men's Soccer
- * Club domestic league appearances and goals

Carlos Manuel Bocanegra (born May 25, 1979) is an American sports executive and former professional soccer player. A two-time MLS Defender of the Year, Bocanegra also played professionally in England, Scotland, France, and Spain. He earned over 100 caps with the United States, serving as captain for six years. He most recently served as technical director and vice president for Atlanta United.

== Early life and education ==
Bocanegra was born in Upland, CA on May 25, 1979, to Manuel and Kelly Bocanegra. He was raised in Alta Loma, Rancho Cucamonga, California, where he attended Alta Loma High School. He has one brother, Diego, who played soccer at Grand Canyon University, UCLA and Fresno State. Diego is currently the head coach of the University of Houston women's soccer team. His father is of Mexican descent. While attending UCLA, Bocanegra studied history and geography. Prior to attending UCLA, Bocanegra was offered scholarships for American football but opted for soccer, which he thought of choosing as his career. He was inducted into the UCLA Athletics Hall of Fame in 2013.

== Club career ==
=== Chicago Fire ===
After playing college soccer at UCLA, Bocanegra signed a Project-40 contract with Major League Soccer and was drafted by the Chicago Fire with the fourth overall pick in the 2000 MLS SuperDraft. He spent most of the year with the Fire, playing two games on loan with Project 40. He won the MLS Rookie of the Year Award for a team that made it to the MLS Championship match and won the Lamar Hunt U.S. Open Cup. He became one of the top defenders in MLS, becoming the first player to win the MLS Defender of the Year Award twice, in 2002 and 2003. Bocanegra scored five goals and had eight assists in his four years in MLS.

=== Fulham ===
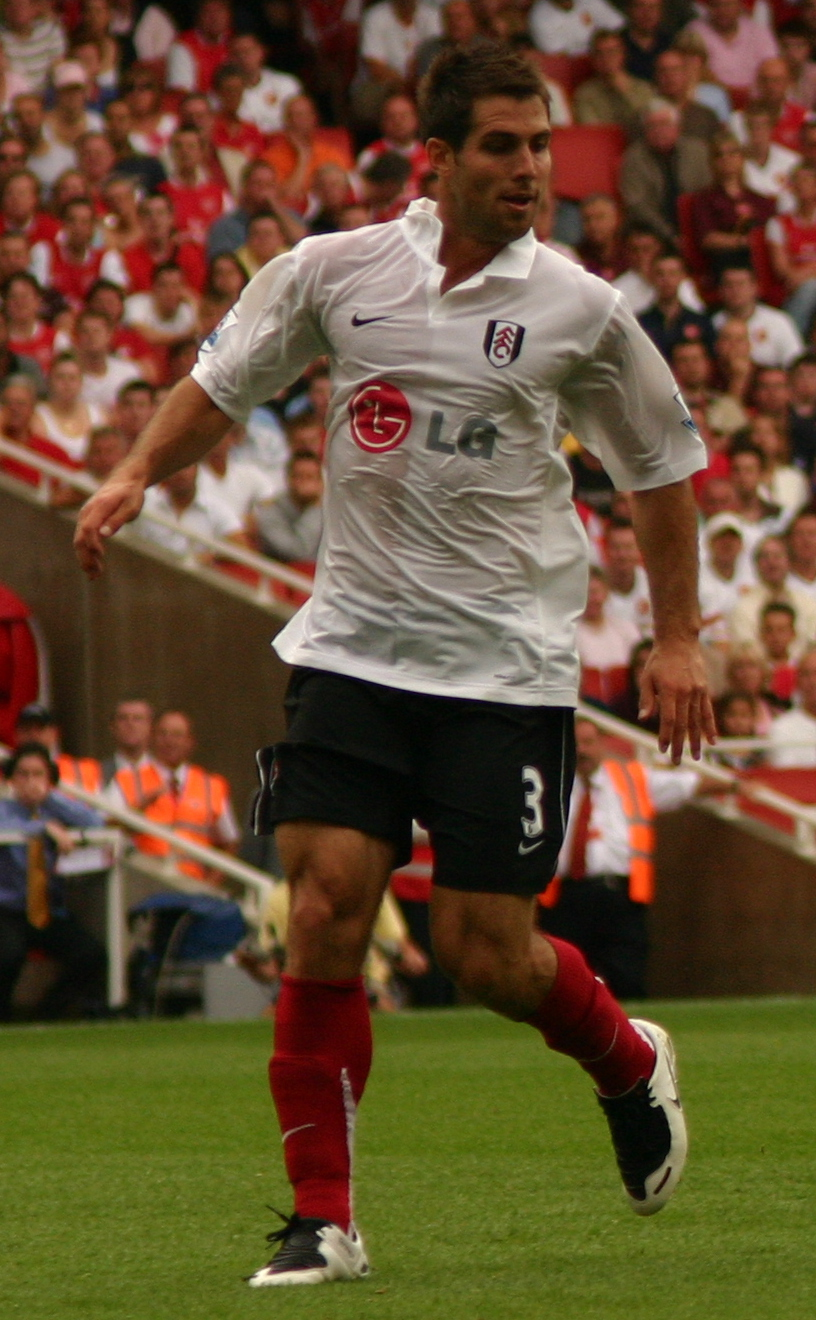
Bocanegra playing for Fulham in 2007

Bocanegra was signed by Fulham in January 2004, quickly becoming a fan favorite, garnering the nicknames the Jackal and the Black Snake. With Fulham, Bocanegra played primarily as a center back, but also as a left back and briefly as a holding midfielder. During the 2006–07 Premier League season, he was Fulham's second leading scorer with five goals, behind fellow American Brian McBride. On September 1, 2007, Bocanegra captained Fulham for the first time in a Premier League match, a come from behind 3–3 draw with Tottenham Hotspur. On September 15, 2007, he made his 100th appearance in the Premier League, all for Fulham, against Wigan Athletic. He was released by Fulham on May 23, 2008.

=== Rennes ===
Bocanegra was signed by Rennes in June 2008. He received the number 3 shirt, which is his number for the United States. Bocanegra performed well in his first season in France, appearing in all 38 league matches. He scored his first league goal on March 8, 2009, in Stade Rennais's 2–0 victory over Auxerre. He also scored a goal in a UEFA Cup match and started all the club's Coupe de France matches. These included the 2009 Coupe de France Final at the Stade de France on May 9, 2009, where he scored Stade Rennais' first goal against Guingamp, in the 70th -1 minute.

=== Saint-Étienne ===
On July 16, 2010, Bocanegra was purchased by fellow Ligue 1 club Saint-Étienne for a reported fee of £400,000. He wore the number three shirt, as he did captaining the U.S. during the 2010 FIFA World Cup. Bocanegra made his debut for the club, on the opening game of the season, in a 3–1 loss against PSG. On December 5, 2010, he scored his first goal for the club, in a 2–2 draw against Bordeaux; followed up his second goal in the Derby du Rhône, but couldn't help Saint-Étienne win, as they lost 4–1. Bocanegra would be often used in first-team ins and outs in his first season. In a match against Nice, on October 17, 2010, Bocanegra suffered whiplash injury, that kept him out for three weeks.

In the 2011–12 season, Bocanegra took the captaincy temporarily following Loïc Perrin's absence, on the opening game of the season, as Saint-Étienne win 2–1 against Bordeaux. This turned out to be his only appearance. He was linked with a move to Rangers, but was warned by Saint-Étienne that they would not sell him.

=== Rangers ===
On August 17, 2011, Bocanegra joined Scottish Premier League side Rangers, signing a three-year deal for an undisclosed fee. Bocanegra made his debut for Rangers against NK Maribor on August 18, 2011, in a UEFA Europa League qualifier. His involvement in this match later caused controversy when Maribor filed a complaint to UEFA regarding the eligibility of Bocanegra's appearance, questioning whether he had the required clearance and paperwork. The protest was rejected by UEFA on August 24 as Maribor did not submit it within twenty-four hours of the match. The club's chief later described the complaint by Maribor regarding Bocanegra's eligibility as 'pathetic mischief making'. He scored his first goal for Rangers in the second leg of the Maribor tie as Rangers crashed out 3–2 on aggregate.

Bocanegra scored his first league goal for the club on September 24 against Dunfermline Athletic in a 4–0 win. His second goal came three months later, on December 17, 2011, during a 2–1 win over Inverness Caledonian Thistle. Bocanegra quickly became a fan favorite after a series of solid and impressive performances alongside his center-back partner, Dorin Goian. He was nicknamed Captain America by the Rangers fans and captained Rangers for the first time on January 8, 2012, during a 4–0 win over Arbroath in the Scottish Cup.

During the season, Rangers went into administration over financial problems and a dispute with HMRC, leading to a 10-point deduction. Bocanegra spoke about the event, describing it as a "horrible experience" and encouraging players to light up the dejected fans. He also stated his desire to stay at the club, insisting he was happy there. During an Old Firm 3–2 victory, on March 25, 2012, Bocanegra received a straight red card after fouling Georgios Samaras, conceding a penalty.

After Rangers FC went into administration, in June 2012 the company's assets, including the players' contracts, were purchased by Charles Green's consortium. Although many players departed because of this, Bocanegra's future was uncertain after not attending training, as he wanted to leave in order to play at a higher level. A few weeks later, on July 29, 2012, McCoist appointed Bocanegra captain for the first round of the Challenge Cup- a 2–1 win over Brechin City. After the game Bocanegra announced his intention to stay, vowing not to walk away from the club. He then made six appearances at the start of the season. After being dropped by the national team, Bocanegra joined Racing de Santander on a season-long loan in an attempt to keep his international career alive.

=== Racing Santander ===
On August 31, 2012, Bocanegra joined Spanish Segunda División side Racing Santander on a season-long loan. Bocanegra expressed a desire to return to Rangers once his loan deal has expired. He made his debut for the club, on September 22, 2012, in a 1–0 win over CD Mirandés. However, his time at Santander was considered "disastrous", as he failed to start the remainder of the matches, though still played regularly, coming on as a substitute. The club was relegated to next division.

On April 9, 2013, Carlos announced on his Twitter page that he would return to Rangers for the 2013–14 season. Though announcing his return, U.S. National Team Coach Jürgen Klinsmann warned Carlos not to play for Rangers next season.

=== Chivas USA ===
In the summer of 2013, Bocanegra left Rangers and signed with Chivas USA. Chivas USA traded up the allocation order with Toronto FC to land his signature, sending a first-round 2015 MLS SuperDraft pick and an international slot to the Canadian club.

Bocanegra retired at the end of the 2014 MLS season.

== International career ==
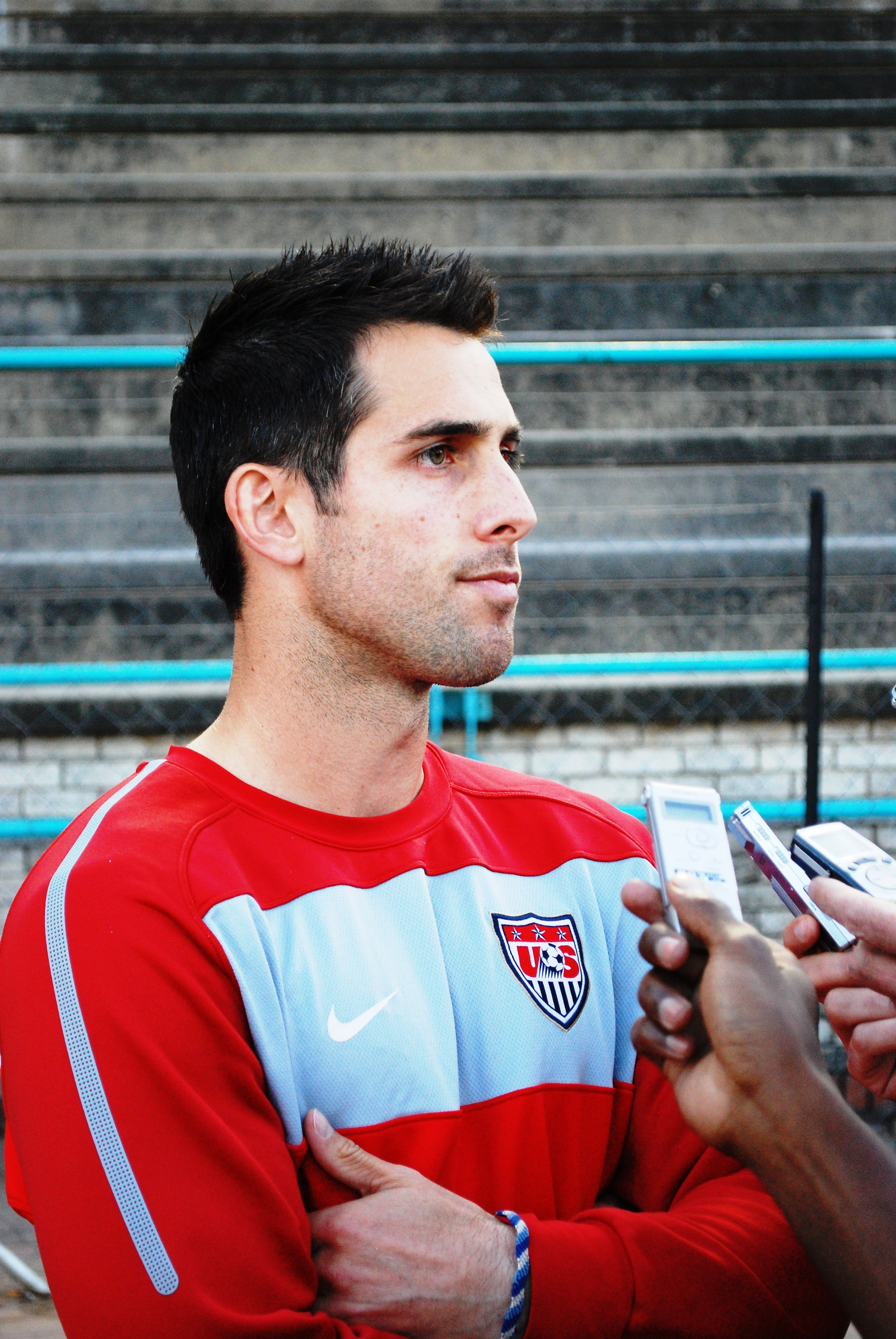
Bocanegra with the United States national team in 2010

Bocanegra played for the United States at the 1999 FIFA World Youth Championship and earned his first senior cap for the U.S. on December 9, 2001, against South Korea. He became a stalwart for the team in 2003, solidifying his position during the 2003 Gold Cup and leading all defenders with thirteen appearances during that year. During World Cup qualification in 2005, his role with the national team became less clear, as he bounced between roles at center back and left back. On May 2, 2006, Bocanegra was named to the United States World Cup roster for the tournament in Germany. He started two of three games at left back during the 2006 World Cup.

Bocanegra was first-choice captain of the U.S. squad under manager Bob Bradley. Bocanegra captained the national team for the first time in a 4–1 U.S. victory in a June 2, 2007, friendly against China. Bocanegra captained the United States national team that defeated No. 1 ranked Spain to win one of the 2009 FIFA Confederations Cup semi-final games on June 24, 2009. He then continued his leadership duties throughout the 2010 FIFA World Cup, starting at left back against England and Slovenia and then as the left-center back against Algeria and Ghana.

On November 15, 2011, Bocanegra joined the 100 cap club achieving his 100th international cap in a friendly against Slovenia. In March 2013, Bocanegra was initially included on the preliminary team for the start of the final stage of World Cup qualification; however, he did not make the final team. Bocanegra's further exclusion from qualification, in part due to his unstable club situation, led to the appointment of Clint Dempsey as captain of the USMNT. Bocanegra was subsequently not a part of the team at the 2013 Gold Cup or the 2014 World Cup.

== Post-playing career ==
Bocanegra was appointed technical director of Atlanta United in March 2015. In October 2017, he signed a new four-year contract with the club, which also added the title of vice president to his role. The club announced he was leaving on September 4, 2024.

He was appointed to co-chair the Technical Development Committee at U.S. Soccer in April 2018.

In September 2020, Bocanegra was elected to the National Soccer Hall of Fame.

== Career statistics ==
=== Club ===
Appearances and goals by club, season and competition
Club	Season	League			National cup (Note: Includes U.S. Open Cup, FA Cup, Coupe de France, Scottish Cup, Copa del Rey)		League cup (Note: Includes Football League, Coupe de la Ligue, Scottish League Cup)		Continental		Total	
Club	Season	Division	Apps	Goals	Apps	Goals	Apps	Goals	Apps	Goals	Apps	Goals
Chicago Fire	2000	Major League Soccer	27	1	4	0	6	0	–		37	1
Chicago Fire	2001	Major League Soccer	15	1	2	0	6	1	–		23	2
Chicago Fire	2002	Major League Soccer	26	2	1	0	3	0	3 (Note: Appearances in CONCACAF Champions' Cup)	1	33	3
Chicago Fire	2003	Major League Soccer	19	1	4	0	4	0	–		27	1
Chicago Fire	Total		87	5	11	0	19	1	3	1	120	7
Fulham	2003–04	Premier League	15	0	4	0	0	0	–		19	0
Fulham	2004–05	Premier League	28	1	4	0	3	0	–		35	1
Fulham	2005–06	Premier League	20	1	0	0	1	0	–		21	1
Fulham	2006–07	Premier League	30	5	3	0	1	0	–		34	5
Fulham	2007–08	Premier League	22	1	2	0	0	0	–		24	1
Fulham	Total		115	8	13	0	5	0	–		133	8
Rennes	2008–09	Ligue 1	38	1	5	1	0	0	2 (Note: Appearances in UEFA Cup)	1	45	3
Rennes	2009–10	Ligue 1	26	1	2	0	1	0	–		29	1
Rennes	Total		64	2	7	1	1	0	2	1	74	4
Saint-Étienne	2010–11	Ligue 1	34	2	1	0	1	0	–		36	2
Saint-Étienne	2011–12	Ligue 1	1	0	0	0	0	0	–		1	0
Saint-Étienne	Total		35	2	1	0	1	0	0	0	37	2
Rangers	2011–12	Scottish Premier League	29	2	2	0	1	0	2 (Note: Appearances in UEFA Europa League)	1	34	3
Rangers	2012–13	Scottish Third Division	3	0	0	0	2	0	2	0	7	0
Rangers	Total		32	2	2	0	3	0	4	1	41	3
Racing de Santander	2012–13	Segunda División	21	0	0	0	–		–		21	0
Chivas USA	2013	Major League Soccer	12	0	–		–		–		12	0
Chivas USA	2014	Major League Soccer	18	0	0	0	–		–		18	0
Chivas USA	Total		30	0	0	0	–		–		30	0
Career total			383	19	34	1	29	1	10	3	446	24

=== International ===
Appearances and goals by national team and year
National team	Year	Apps	Goals
United States	2001	1	0
United States	2002	6	0
United States	2003	13	4
United States	2004	10	1
United States	2005	8	1
United States	2006	4	0
United States	2007	11	2
United States	2008	9	2
United States	2009	14	1
United States	2010	9	1
United States	2011	15	0
United States	2012	10	2
Total		110	14

Scores and results list the United States' goal tally first, score column indicates score after each Bocanegra goal

List of international goals scored by Carlos Bocanegra
No.	Date	Venue	Opponent	Score	Result	Competition
1	January 18, 2003	Lockhart Stadium, Ft. Lauderdale, United States	Canada	1–0	4–0	Friendly
2	February 13, 2003	National Stadium, Kingston, Jamaica	Jamaica	1–0	2–1	Friendly
3	July 23, 2003	Orange Bowl, Miami, United States	Brazil	1–0	1–2	2003 CONCACAF Gold Cup
4	July 26, 2003	Orange Bowl, Miami, United States	Costa Rica	1–1	3–2	2003 CONCACAF Gold Cup
5	July 11, 2004	Soldier Field, Chicago, United States	Poland	1–1	1–1	Friendly
6	June 8, 2005	Estadio Rommel Fernández, Panama City, Panama	Panama	1–0	3–0	2006 FIFA World Cup qualification
7	June 16, 2007	Gillette Stadium, Foxborough, United States	Panama	2–0	2–1	2007 CONCACAF Gold Cup
8	September 9, 2007	Soldier Field, Chicago, United States	Brazil	1–0	2–4	Friendly
9	March 26, 2008	Wisla Stadium, Kraków, Poland	Poland	1–0	3–0	Friendly
10	August 20, 2008	Estadio Mateo Flores, Guatemala City, Guatemala	Guatemala	1–0	1–0	2010 FIFA World Cup qualification
11	June 6, 2009	Soldier Field, Chicago, United States	Honduras	2–1	2–1	2010 FIFA World Cup qualification
12	March 3, 2010	Amsterdam Arena, Amsterdam, Netherlands	Netherlands	1–2	1–2	Friendly
13	June 8, 2012	Raymond James Stadium, Tampa, United States	Antigua and Barbuda	1–0	3–1	2014 FIFA World Cup qualification
14	October 16, 2012	Livestrong Sporting Park, Kansas City, United States	Guatemala	1–1	3–1	2014 FIFA World Cup qualification

== Honors ==
Chicago Fire

- U.S. Open Cup: 2000, 2003

United States

- CONCACAF Gold Cup: 2002, 2007

Individual

- MLS Rookie of the Year: 2000
- MLS Defender of the Year: 2002, 2003
- MLS Best XI: 2002, 2003

== See also ==
- List of men's footballers with 100 or more international caps
