= Nicolas Douchez =

French footballer (born 1980)

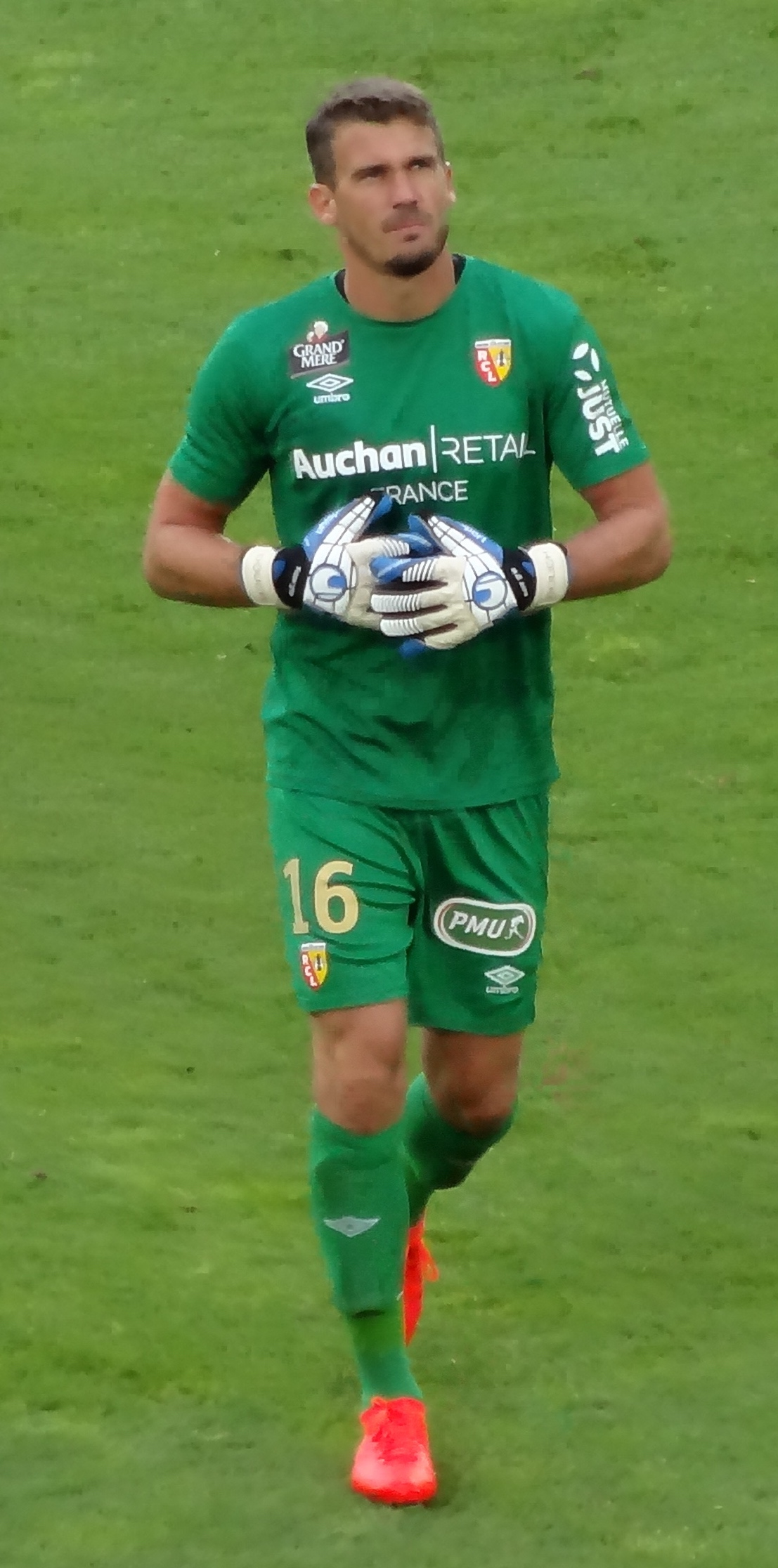
- Douchez with Lens in 2016

Personal information
- Full name: Nicolas Pascal Douchez
- Date of birth: 22 April 1980 (age 46)
- Place of birth: Rosny-sous-Bois, Seine-Saint-Denis, France
- Height: 1.86 m (6 ft 1 in)
- Position: Goalkeeper

Senior career*
Years	Team	Apps	(Gls)
1999–2004	Le Havre	0	(0)
2003–2004	→ Châteauroux (loan)	26	(0)
2004–2008	Toulouse	86	(0)
2008–2011	Rennes	111	(0)
2011–2016	Paris Saint-Germain	11	(0)
2016–2018	Lens	46	(0)
2018–2019	Red Star	20	(0)
Total		300	(0)
- * Club domestic league appearances and goals

Nicolas Pascal Douchez (born 22 April 1980) is a French former professional footballer who played as a goalkeeper.

== Early life ==
Nicolas Pascal Douchez was born on 22 April 1980 in Rosny-sous-Bois, Seine-Saint-Denis.

== Club career ==
=== Toulouse ===
In 2005, Douchez signed for Toulouse FC. He played 86 league games for the club before signing with Rennes.

=== Rennes ===
Douchez signed for Rennes in 2008, where he spent over three years with the club playing over 100 league games.

=== Paris Saint-Germain ===
In 2011 Douchez signed for Paris Saint-Germain on a free transfer from Rennes. He was given the number 1 jersey for the upcoming season. Although he was initially expected to be the starter, this changed following the arrival of new club management, which recruited Salvatore Sirigu, who instead became the team's starting goalkeeper. Douchez played in the club's 2–1 victory over Lyon in the 2014 Coupe de la Ligue Final on 19 April 2014. After the arrival of Kevin Trapp, Douchez became third goalkeeper.

=== Lens ===
In July 2016, free agent Douchez signed a three-year contract with Ligue 2 side RC Lens.

=== Red Star ===
In July 2018, Douchez signed for Red Star, newly promoted to Ligue 2.

== International career ==
On 1 October 2009, Douchez was called up to France manager Raymond Domenech's 23-man squad for 2010 FIFA World Cup qualifiers against Faroe Islands and Austria.

== Career statistics ==
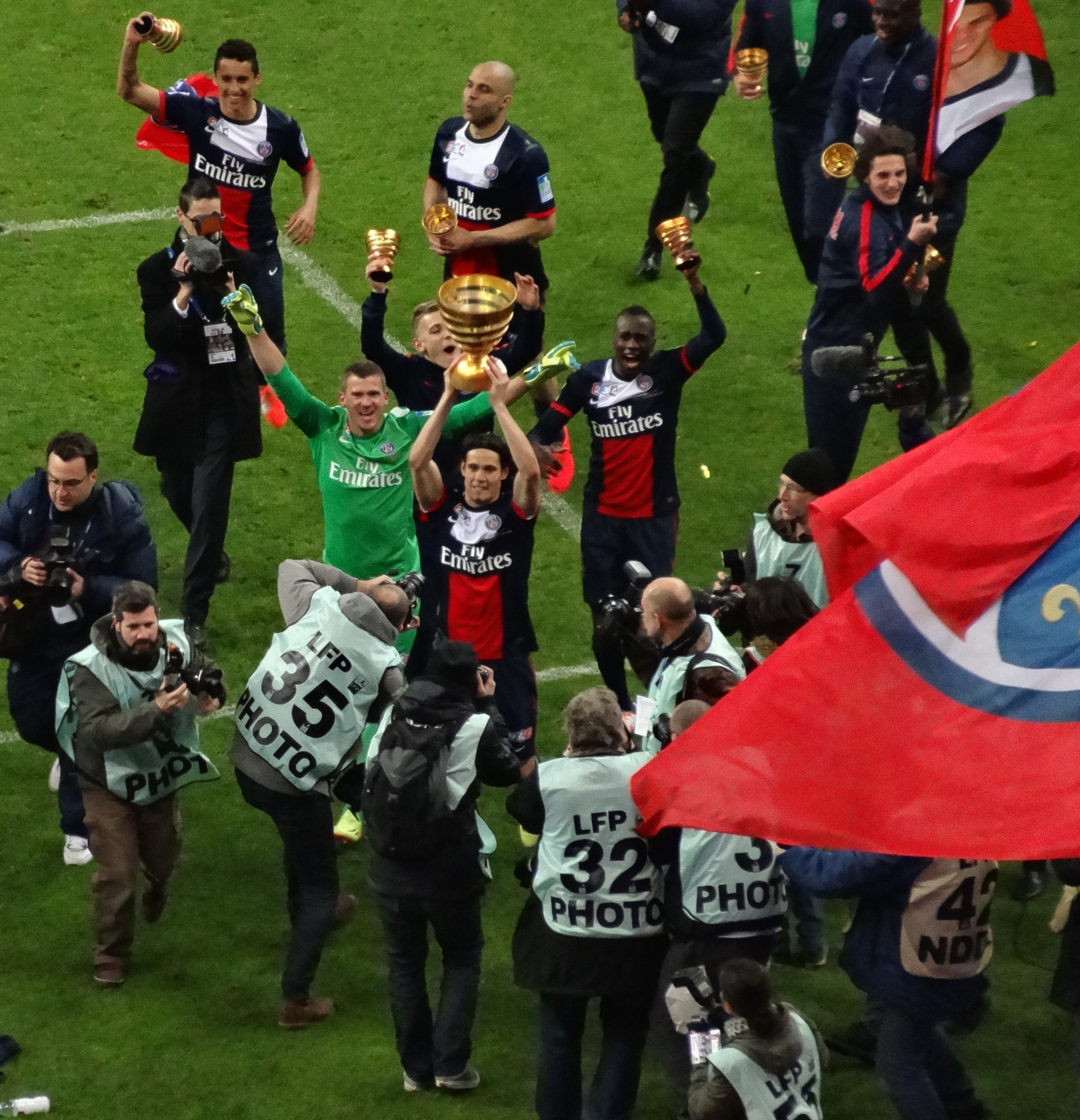
Douchez celebrating the 2013–14 Coupe de la Ligue win

Appearances and goals by club, season and competition
Club	Season	League			National Cup		League Cup		Continental		Other		Total	
Club	Season	Division	Apps	Goals	Apps	Goals	Apps	Goals	Apps	Goals	Apps	Goals	Apps	Goals
Le Havre	1998–99	Division 1	0	0	0	0	0	0	—		—		0	0
Le Havre	1999–2000	Division 1	0	0	0	0	0	0	—		—		0	0
Le Havre	2000–01	Division 2	0	0	0	0	0	0	—		—		0	0
Le Havre	2001–02	Division 2	0	0	0	0	0	0	—		—		0	0
Le Havre	2002–03	Ligue 1	0	0	0	0	1	0	—		—		1	0
Le Havre	Total		0	0	0	0	1	0	—		—		1	0
Châteauroux (loan)	2003–04	Ligue 2	26	0	0	0	1	0	—		—		27	0
Toulouse	2004–05	Ligue 1	0	0	0	0	0	0	—		—		0	0
Toulouse	2005–06	Ligue 1	14	0	1	0	2	0	—		—		17	0
Toulouse	2006–07	Ligue 1	36	0	2	0	2	0	—		—		40	0
Toulouse	2007–08	Ligue 1	36	0	1	0	0	0	7 (Note: Two appearances in UEFA Champions League, five appearances in UEFA Cup)	0	—		44	0
Toulouse	Total		86	0	4	0	4	0	7	0	—		101	0
Rennes	2008–09	Ligue 1	37	0	6	0	1	0	4 (Note: Appearances in UEFA Europa League)	0	—		50	0
Rennes	2009–10	Ligue 1	37	0	2	0	2	0	—		—		41	0
Rennes	2010–11	Ligue 1	37	0	1	0	0	0	—		—		38	0
Rennes	Total		111	0	9	0	3	0	4	0	—		129	0
Paris Saint-Germain	2011–12	Ligue 1	0	0	2	0	1	0	7	0	—		10	0
Paris Saint-Germain	2012–13	Ligue 1	4	0	4	0	2	0	0	0	—		10	0
Paris Saint-Germain	2013–14	Ligue 1	1	0	2	0	3	0	0	0	0	0	6	0
Paris Saint-Germain	2014–15	Ligue 1	5	0	6	0	4	0	0	0	0	0	15	0
Paris Saint-Germain	2015–16	Ligue 1	1	0	0	0	1	0	0	0	—		2	0
Paris Saint-Germain	Total		11	0	14	0	11	0	7	0	0	0	43	0
Lens	2016–17	Ligue 2	38	0	0	0	0	0	—		—		38	0
Lens	2017–18	Ligue 2	8	0	0	0	0	0	—		—		8	0
Lens	Total		46	0	0	0	0	0	—		—		46	0
Red Star	2018–19	Ligue 2	20	0	0	0	0	0	—		—		20	0
Career total			300	0	27	0	20	0	18	0	0	0	365	0

== Honours ==
Rennes

- UEFA Intertoto Cup: 2008

Paris Saint-Germain

- Ligue 1: 2012–13, 2013–14
- Coupe de France: 2014–15
- Coupe de la Ligue: 2013–14, 2014–15
- Trophée des Champions: 2013, 2014
