= Kévin Théophile-Catherine =

French footballer (born 1989)

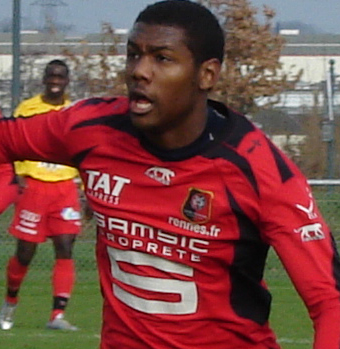
- Théophile-Catherine playing for Rennes in 2010

Personal information
- Date of birth: 28 October 1989 (age 37)
- Place of birth: Saint-Brieuc, France
- Height: 1.83 m (6 ft 0 in)
- Position: Defender

Youth career
- 2005–2009: Rennes

Senior career*
Years	Team	Apps	(Gls)
2008–2013	Rennes	98	(3)
2013–2015	Cardiff City	28	(0)
2014–2015	→ Saint-Étienne (loan)	31	(0)
2015–2018	Saint-Étienne	78	(1)
2018–2026	Dinamo Zagreb	140	(5)

International career^{‡}
2008–2009	France U20	4	(0)
2010	France U21	1	(0)
- * Club domestic league appearances and goals as of 20:39, 5 October 2025 (UTC) ‡ National team caps and goals as of 3 September 2010

Kévin Théophile-Catherine (born 28 October 1989) is a French professional footballer who plays as a centre-back.

== Career ==
=== Stade Rennais ===
Théophile-Catherine was born in Saint-Brieuc, Brittany to a Martiniquais father, and a Réunionnais mother of Indian Malbars descent.

Théophile-Catherine spent more than six seasons with Rennes, playing a key role as they won the French Under-18 Cup in 2007 and the National Under-19 trophy a year later.

He made his first team debut against Le Mans in the League Cup and made his first French League appearance in a goalless draw against Lille, both during 2009, while he signed a first professional contract in the same year.

He totalled 120 professional appearances for the club, scoring twice.

=== Cardiff City ===
Théophile-Catherine signed for Cardiff City, newly promoted to the Premier League, on a four-year deal on 31 August 2013 for a reported fee of €2.4 million (£2.1 million). He made his debut two weeks later, playing the full 90 minutes in a 1–1 draw against Hull City.

=== Saint-Étienne ===
On 18 August 2014, Théophile-Catherine returned to Ligue 1 when he signed for Saint-Étienne on loan until the end of the 2014–15 season with an option to buy.

On 15 June 2015, Saint-Étienne made the deal permanent for three years, for a fee believed to be in the region of €2 million (£1.45 million).

Over his four years at the Stade Geoffroy-Guichard, Théophile-Catherine played 142 games. He scored once, on 2 April 2016 in a 2–0 win at Gazélec Ajaccio.

=== Dinamo Zagreb ===
In June 2018, Théophile-Catherine moved to Dinamo Zagreb on a three-year deal. He debuted in the Croatian First Football League on 17 August and scored in a 2–1 home win over Osijek.

In June 2020, he signed a new three-year deal.

He left the club at the end of the 2022–23 season, as his contract was not renewed. However, after being a free agent for three months, and due to bad performances of the club's defenders, he rejoined Dinamo in October 2023.

== Career statistics ==
As of match played 6 November 2025

Appearances and goals by club, season and competition
Club	Season	League			National cup (Note: Includes Coupe de France, FA Cup, Croatian Cup)		League cup (Note: Includes Coupe de la Ligue, Football League Cup)		Europe		Total	
Club	Season	Division	Apps	Goals	Apps	Goals	Apps	Goals	Apps	Goals	Apps	Goals
Rennes	2008–09	Ligue 1	2	0	0	0	0	0	—		2	0
Rennes	2009–10	Ligue 1	2	0	0	0	1	0	—		3	0
Rennes	2010–11	Ligue 1	26	2	3	0	1	0	—		30	2
Rennes	2011–12	Ligue 1	36	0	4	0	0	0	6 (Note: Appearances in UEFA Europa League)	0	46	0
Rennes	2012–13	Ligue 1	29	1	1	0	3	0	—		33	1
Rennes	2013–14	Ligue 1	3	0	0	0	0	0	—		3	0
Rennes	Total		98	3	8	0	5	0	6	0	117	3
Cardiff City	2013–14	Premier League	28	0	2	0	0	0	—		30	0
Cardiff City	2014–15	Championship	0	0	0	0	1	0	—		1	0
Cardiff City	Total		28	0	2	0	1	0	—		31	0
Saint-Étienne (loan)	2014–15	Ligue 1	31	0	4	0	2	0	5	0	42	0
Saint-Étienne	2015–16	Ligue 1	22	1	3	0	0	0	6	0	31	1
Saint-Étienne	2016–17	Ligue 1	31	0	1	0	0	0	10	0	42	0
Saint-Étienne	2017–18	Ligue 1	25	0	1	0	1	0	—		27	0
Saint-Étienne	Total		109	1	9	0	3	0	21	0	142	1
Dinamo Zagreb	2018–19	HNL	14	1	3	0	—		15 (Note: Six appearances in UEFA Champions League, nine appearances in UEFA Europa League)	0	32	1
Dinamo Zagreb	2019–20	HNL	21	1	1	0	—		5 (Note: Appearances in UEFA Champions League)	0	27	1
Dinamo Zagreb	2020–21	HNL	28	1	4	0	—		12 (Note: One appearance in UEFA Champions League, eleven appearances in UEFA Europa League)	0	44	1
Dinamo Zagreb	2021–22	HNL	22	0	1	0	—		16 (Note: Eight appearances in UEFA Champions League, eight appearances in UEFA Europa League)	0	39	0
Dinamo Zagreb	2022–23	HNL	7	0	4	0	—		2	0	13	0
Dinamo Zagreb	2023–24	HNL	21	0	3	0	—		4	0	28	0
Dinamo Zagreb	2024–25	HNL	25	2	1	0	—		9	0	35	2
Dinamo Zagreb	2025–26	HNL	3	0	0	0	—		2	0	5	0
Dinamo Zagreb	Total		140	5	17	0	—		62	0	219	5
Career total			375	9	36	0	9	0	89	0	513	9

== Honours ==
Rennes

- Coupe Gambardella: 2008

Dinamo Zagreb

- Prva HNL: 2018–19, 2019–20, 2020–21, 2021–22, 2023–24
- Croatian Cup: 2020–21, 2023–24
- Croatian Super Cup: 2019
