= Lucien Aubey =

Congolese footballer (born 1984)

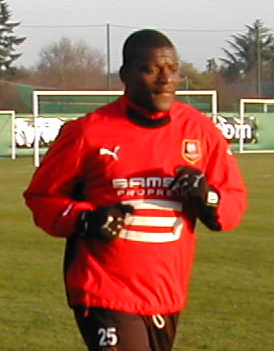
- Aubey with Rennes in 2008

Personal information
- Full name: Lucien Yann Sherril Aubey
- Date of birth: 24 May 1984 (age 42)
- Place of birth: Brazzaville, Republic of the Congo
- Height: 1.80 m (5 ft 11 in)
- Position: Defender

Youth career
- Paris FC
- Cannes

Senior career*
Years	Team	Apps	(Gls)
2001–2007	Toulouse	152	(0)
2007	Lens	12	(0)
2008	→ Portsmouth (loan)	3	(0)
2008–2009	Rennes	16	(0)
2009–2010	Sivasspor	9	(0)
2010–2012	Reims	13	(0)
2012	Olympiakos Nicosia	0	(0)
Total		205	(0)

International career
2001–2007	France U21		
2009–2011	Congo	5	(0)
- * Club domestic league appearances and goals

Lucien Yann Sherril Aubey (born 24 May 1984) is a Congolese former professional footballer who played as a defender.

== Club career ==
Aubey was born in Brazzaville, Republic of the Congo. He confirmed he wanted to leave Toulouse after eight years of service with them, and joined finally Lens (5 July).

On 18 January 2008, he joined English Premier League side Portsmouth on loan for the rest of the season. He made few appearances, and was not bought by the English club.

On 5 August 2008, he joined Rennes for a three-year contract. The Turkish club Sivasspor ended the purchase, from Rennes, of the central defender. He signed a deal until June 2011 with an option for another year.

== International career ==
Aubey played for France U-21 in the 2006 UEFA European Under-21 Football Championship. He made a full international debut for Congo on 12 August 2009 in a friendly against Morocco.

== External reference ==
- Lucien Aubey's profile, stats & pics (in French)
- Lucien Aubey at Soccerbase
- Lucien Aubey – French league stats at LFP – also available in French (archived)
- Lucien Aubey at L'Équipe (archive) (in French)
- Lucien Aubey at ESPN FC
- Lucien Aubey at National-Football-Teams.com
