= Kader Mangane =

Senegalese footballer (born 1983)

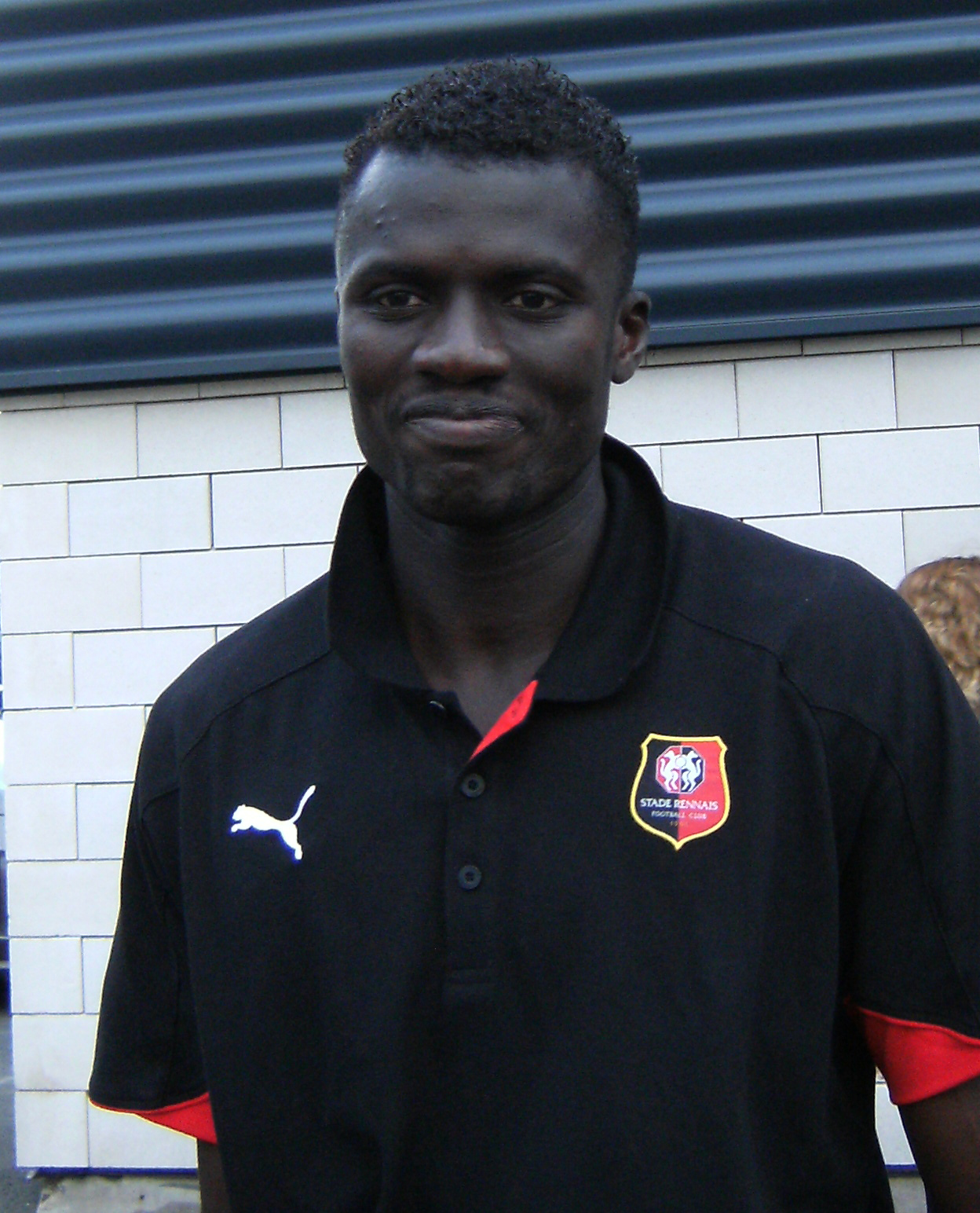
- Mangane with Rennes

Personal information
- Full name: Abdou Kader Mangane
- Date of birth: 23 March 1983 (age 43)
- Place of birth: Thiès, Senegal
- Height: 1.93 m (6 ft 4 in)
- Positions: Centre-back; defensive midfielder

Senior career*
Years	Team	Apps	(Gls)
2000–2001	US Rail	17	(4)
2001–2007	Neuchâtel Xamax	150	(14)
2007	Young Boys	7	(1)
2007–2008	Lens	23	(5)
2008–2012	Rennes	102	(9)
2012–2015	Al-Hilal	14	(2)
2013	→ Sunderland (loan)	2	(0)
2013–2015	→ Kayseri Erciyesspor (loan)	36	(3)
2015–2016	Gazélec Ajaccio	31	(1)
2016–2018	Strasbourg	39	(2)
2017–2018	Strasbourg B	2	(0)
Total		423	(41)

International career
2003–2012	Senegal	23	(1)
- * Club domestic league appearances and goals

Abdou Kader Mangane (born 23 March 1983) is a Senegalese former professional footballer who played as a centre-back and defensive midfielder. He spent most of his career in France. At international level, he made 23 appearances for the Senegal national team scoring 1 goal.

== Club career ==
Mangane began his career in his native Senegal before joining Switzerland and Neuchâtel Xamax in 2001, where he spent six years. He then went to play five seasons in French Ligue 1, for Lens during the 2007–08 season, and Rennes.

On 17 July 2012, Mangane signed a three-year contract with Saudi club Al-Hilal for an undisclosed fee.

He joined English Premier League team Sunderland on loan until the end of the season on 14 January 2013.

On 31 July 2015, Mangane signed for Gazélec Ajaccio on a one-year contract.

== Controversy ==
On 21 March 2009, during a Ligue 1 game against Valenciennes he seriously injured opposing midfielder Jonathan Lacourt in a challenge which resulted in a double fracture of the tibia and fibula. He was suspended until 1 June 2009.

== Personal life ==
Mangane acquired French nationality by naturalization on 16 May 2011.
