= 2008–09 Stade Rennais FC season =

Rennes
2008–09 season
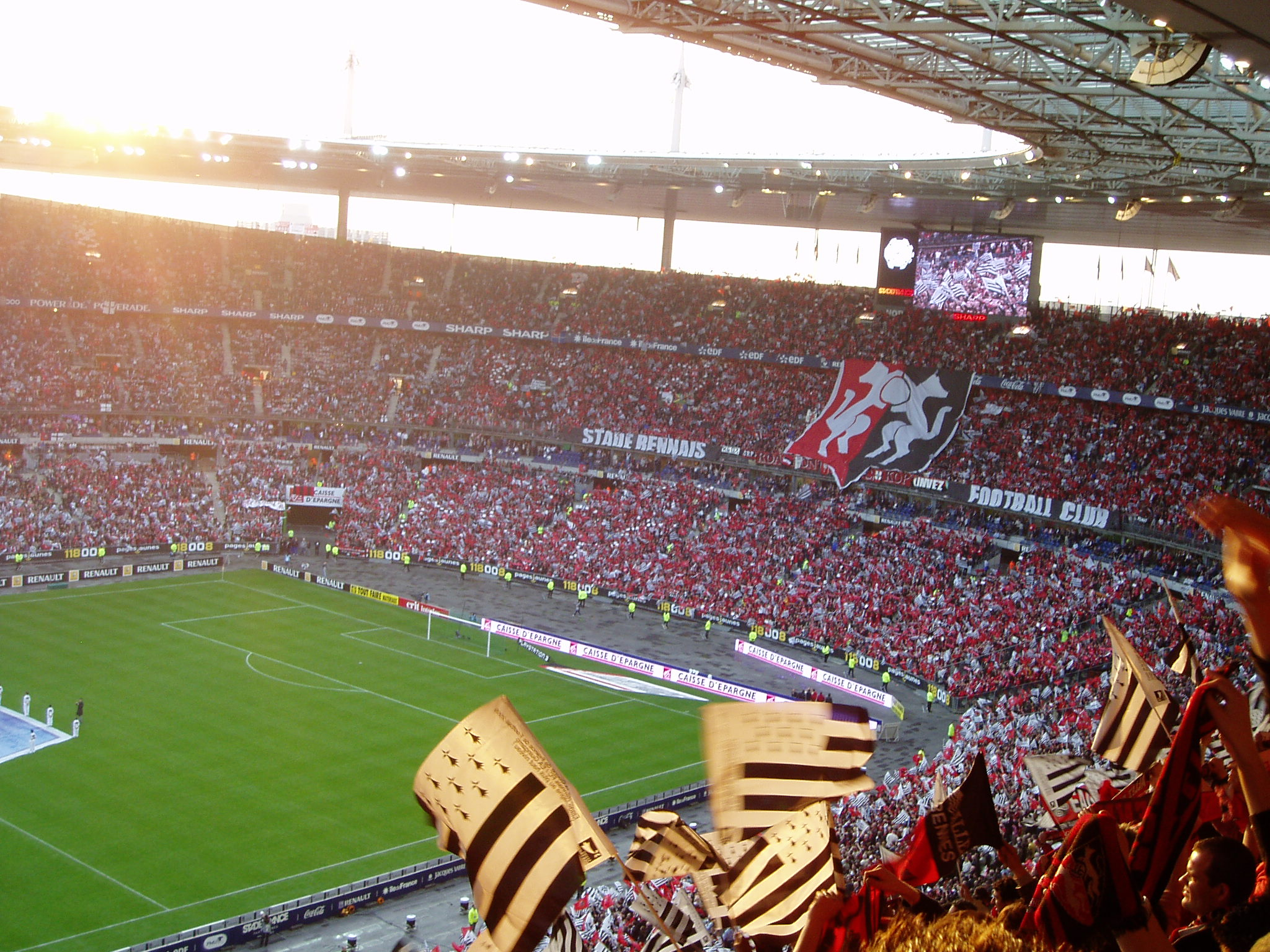
- Rennes supporters' stand during the Coupe de France final
- President: Frédéric de Saint-Sernin
- Head coach: Guy Lacombe
- Stadium: Stade de la Route de Lorient
- Ligue 1: 7th
- Coupe de France: Runners-up
- Coupe de la Ligue: Round of 16
- UEFA Cup: First round
- Top goalscorer: League: Moussa Sow (9); All: Moussa Sow (10)
Home colours	Away colours	Third colours

The 2008–09 season was the 108th season in the existence of Stade Rennais FC and the club's 15th consecutive season in the top flight of French football. In addition to the domestic league, Angers participated in this season's edition of the Coupe de France and the Coupe de la Ligue. The season covered the period from 1 July 2008 to 30 June 2009.

== Competitions ==
=== Overview ===
Competition	First match	Last match	Starting round	Final position	Record							
Competition	First match	Last match	Starting round	Final position	Pld	W	D	L	GF	GA	GD	Win %
Ligue 1	9 August 2008	30 May 2009	Matchday 1	7th	38	15	16	7	42	34	+8	39.47
Coupe de France	3 January 2009	9 May 2009	Round of 64	Runners-up	6	5	0	1	10	2	+8	83.33
Coupe de la Ligue	24 September 2008	12 November 2008	Third round	Round of 16	2	0	1	1	3	4	−1	0.00
UEFA Cup	14 August 2008	2 October 2008	Second qualifying round	First round	4	2	0	2	5	4	+1	50.00
Total					50	22	17	11	60	44	+16	44.00

Source: Soccerway

=== Ligue 1 ===
==== League table ====
Pos	Team	Pld	W	D	L	GF	GA	GD	Pts	Qualification or relegation
5	Lille	38	17	13	8	51	39	+12	64	Qualification to Europa League third qualifying round
6	Paris Saint-Germain	38	19	7	12	49	38	+11	64	
7	Rennes	38	15	16	7	42	34	+8	61	
8	Auxerre	38	16	7	15	35	35	0	55	
9	Nice	38	13	11	14	40	41	−1	50	

Source: Ligue 1
Rules for classification: 1) points; 2) goal difference; 3) number of goals scored.
France's third UEFA Europa League spot went to Ligue 2 side Guingamp, winners of 2008–09 Coupe de France.

==== Results summary ====
Overall								Home						Away					
Pld	W	D	L	GF	GA	GD	Pts	W	D	L	GF	GA	GD	W	D	L	GF	GA	GD
38	15	16	7	42	34	+8	61	11	7	1	28	14	+14	4	9	6	14	20	−6

Source: Ligue 1

==== Results by round ====
Round	1	2	3	4	5	6	7	8	9	10	11	12	13	14	15	16	17	18	19	20	21	22	23	24	25	26	27	28	29	30	31	32	33	34	35	36	37	38
Ground	H	A	H	A	H	A	H	H	A	H	A	H	A	H	A	H	A	H	A	H	A	H	A	H	A	A	H	A	H	A	H	A	H	A	H	A	H	A
Result	D	L	W	D	D	D	W	W	D	D	D	W	W	W	D	W	D	D	W	W	L	D	L	D	W	D	W	D	D	L	W	L	L	W	W	D	W	L
Position	10	16	10	10	13	12	10	7	7	9	9	6	4	3	4	2	3	5	3	3	4	5	7	6	7	6	6	7	7	7	7	7	7	7	7	7	6	7

Source: Ligue 1
A = Away; H = Home; W = Win; D = Draw; L = Loss

==== Matches ====
The league fixtures were announced on 23 May 2008.

9 August 2008 1	Rennes	4–4	Marseille	Rennes
21:00 CEST (UTC+2)				Stadium: Roazhon Park; Attendance: 28,879

17 August 2008 2	Grenoble	1–0	Rennes	Grenoble
16:00				Stadium: Stade des Alpes; Attendance: 17,535

24 August 2008 3	Rennes	2–1	Lille	Rennes
16:00				Stadium: Stade de la Route de Lorient; Attendance: 20,878

31 August 2008 4	Toulouse	0–0	Rennes	Toulouse
17:00				Stadium: Stadium de Toulouse

13 September 2008 5	Rennes	1–1	Le Havre	Rennes
19:00				Stadium: Stade de la Route de Lorient; Attendance: 18,536

21 September 2008 6	Nancy	0–0	Rennes	Tomblaine
17:00				Stadium: Stade Marcel Picot

27 September 2008 7	Rennes	1–0	Nice	Rennes
19:00				Stadium: Stade de la Route de Lorient; Attendance: 19,776

5 October 2008 8	Rennes	3–0	Lyon	Rennes
17:00				Stadium: Stade de la Route de Lorient; Attendance: 27,816

19 October 2008 9	Auxerre	0–0	Rennes	Auxerre
17:00				Stadium: Stade de l'Abbé Deschamps; Attendance: 10,974

25 October 2008 10	Rennes	2–2	Le Mans	Rennes
19:00				Stadium: Stade de la Route de Lorient; Attendance: 23,555

29 October 2008 11	Valenciennes	0–0	Rennes	Valenciennes
19:00				Stadium: Stade Nungesser; Attendance: 12,428

2 November 2008 12	Rennes	1–0	Sochaux	Rennes
17:00				Stadium: Stade de la Route de Lorient; Attendance: 21,856

9 November 2008 13	Saint-Étienne	0–3	Rennes	Saint-Étienne
17:00				Stadium: Stade Geoffroy-Guichard; Attendance: 24,441

16 November 2008 14	Rennes	2–1	Monaco	Rennes
17:00				Stadium: Stade de la Route de Lorient; Attendance: 21,086

22 November 2008 15	Bordeaux	1–1	Rennes	Bordeaux
19:00				Stadium: Stade Chaban-Delmas; Attendance: 25,213

30 November 2008 16	Rennes	1–0	Paris Saint-Germain	Rennes
21:00				Stadium: Stade de la Route de Lorient; Attendance: 27,551

6 December 2008 17	Caen	1–1	Rennes	Caen
19:00				Stadium: Stade Michel d'Ornano; Attendance: 19,084

13 December 2008 18	Rennes	0–0	Nantes	Rennes
21:00				Stadium: Stade de la Route de Lorient; Attendance: 28,652

20 December 2008 19	Lorient	1–2	Rennes	Lorient
19:00				Stadium: Stade du Moustoir; Attendance: 14,366

10 January 2009 20	Rennes	1–0	Grenoble	Rennes
21:00				Stadium: Stade de la Route de Lorient

18 January 2009 21	Lille	2–1	Rennes	Villeneuve d'Ascq
21:00				Stadium: Stadium Lille Métropole; Attendance: 12,031

31 January 2009 22	Rennes	0–0	Toulouse	Rennes
21:00				Stadium: Stade de la Route de Lorient

7 February 2009 23	Le Havre	2–1	Rennes	Le Havre
19:00				Stadium: Stade Jules Deschaseaux; Attendance: 12,618

14 February 2009 24	Rennes	1–1	Nancy	Rennes
19:00				Stadium: Stade de la Route de Lorient; Attendance: 19,002

21 February 2009 25	Nice	0–1	Rennes	Nice
21:00				Stadium: Stade du Ray; Attendance: 9,718

1 March 2009 26	Lyon	1–1	Rennes	Lyon
21:00				Stadium: Stade de Gerland; Attendance: 34,870

8 March 2009 27	Rennes	2–0	Auxerre	Rennes
17:00				Stadium: Stade de la Route de Lorient; Attendance: 27,116

14 March 2009 28	Le Mans	2–2	Rennes	Le Mans
19:00				Stadium: Stade Léon-Bollée; Attendance: 9,862

21 March 2009 29	Rennes	0–0	Valenciennes	Rennes
19:00				Stadium: Stade de la Route de Lorient; Attendance: 26,053

5 April 2009 30	Sochaux	3–0	Rennes	Montbéliard
17:00				Stadium: Stade Auguste Bonal; Attendance: 13,654

11 April 2009 31	Rennes	1–0	Saint-Étienne	Rennes
21:00				Stadium: Stade de la Route de Lorient; Attendance: 25,222

18 April 2009 32	Monaco	3–1	Rennes	Monaco
19:00				Stadium: Stade Louis II; Attendance: 7,714

29 April 2009 33	Rennes	2–3	Bordeaux	Rennes
20:00				Stadium: Stade de la Route de Lorient; Attendance: 26,079

3 May 2009 34	Paris Saint-Germain	0–1	Rennes	Paris
17:00				Stadium: Parc des Princes; Attendance: 43,875

13 May 2009 35	Rennes	1–0	Caen	Rennes
19:00				Stadium: Stade de la Route de Lorient; Attendance: 20,880

17 May 2009 36	Nantes	1–1	Rennes	Nantes
17:00				Stadium: Stade de la Beaujoire; Attendance: 26,078

23 May 2009 37	Rennes	3–1	Lorient	Rennes
21:00				Stadium: Stade de la Route de Lorient; Attendance: 27,728

30 May 2009 38	Marseille	4–0	Rennes	Marseille
21:00				Stadium: Stade Vélodrome; Attendance: 55,873

=== Coupe de France ===
3 January 2009 Round of 64	Sochaux	0–1	Rennes	Montbéliard
21:00				Stadium: Stade Auguste Bonal; Attendance: 4,546

24 January 2009 Round of 32	Rennes	2–0	Saint-Étienne	Rennes
20:30				Stadium: Stade de la Route de Lorient; Attendance: 14,105

4 March 2009 Round of 16	Rennes	3–0	Lorient	Rennes
20:45				Stadium: Stade de la Route de Lorient; Attendance: 14,650

18 March 2009 Quarter-finals	Rennes	2–0	Rodez	Rennes
19:00				Stadium: Stade de la Route de Lorient; Attendance: 18,964

21 April 2009 Semi-finals	Grenoble	1–2	Rennes	Grenoble
20:45				Stadium: Stade des Alpes; Attendance: 17,822

9 May 2009 Final	Rennes	1–2	Guingamp	Saint-Denis
20:45				Stadium: Stade de France; Attendance: 80,056

=== Coupe de la Ligue ===
24 September 2008 Third round	Rennes	2–2 (a.e.t.) (4–3 p)	Le Mans	Rennes
21:00				Stadium: Stade de la Route de Lorient; Attendance: 11,089

12 November 2008 Round of 16	Le Havre	2–1	Rennes	Le Havre
21:00				Stadium: Stade Jules Deschaseaux; Attendance: 5,540
