= 2014–15 Stade Rennais FC season =

Rennes
2014–15 season
- Chairman: René Ruello
- Manager: Philippe Montanier
- Stadium: Stade de la Route de Lorient
- Ligue 1: 9th
- Coupe de France: Round of 16 vs. Monaco
- Coupe de la Ligue: Quarter-finals vs. Bastia
- Top goalscorer: League: Paul-Georges Ntep (9); All: Paul-Georges Ntep (9)
- Highest home attendance: 27,194 vs Paris Saint-Germain (13 September 2014)
- Lowest home attendance: 8,566 vs Reims (22 January 2015)
- Average home league attendance: 20,124
Home colours	Away colours	Third colours

The 2014–15 Stade Rennais season was the 114th professional season of the club since its creation in 1901.

== Players ==
=== First team squad ===
French teams are limited to four players without EU citizenship. Hence, the squad list includes only the principal nationality of each player; several non-European players on the squad have dual citizenship with an EU country. Also, players from the ACP countries—countries in Africa, the Caribbean, and the Pacific that are signatories to the Cotonou Agreement—are not counted against non-EU quotas due to the Kolpak ruling.

Note: Flags indicate national team as defined under FIFA eligibility rules; some limited exceptions apply. Players may hold more than one non-FIFA nationality.

No.	Pos.	Nation	Player
1	GK	FRA	Benoît Costil
3	DF	SEN	Cheikh M'Bengue
4	DF	MOZ	Mexer
6	MF	SUI	Gelson Fernandes
7	FW	FRA	Paul-Georges Ntep
8	MF	FRA	Abdoulaye Doucouré
9	FW	SWE	Ola Toivonen
10	FW	POL	Kamil Grosicki
11	FW	AUT	Philipp Hosiner
12	DF	FRA	Steven Moreira
13	MF	BEL	Christian Brüls
14	DF	SEN	Fallou Diagné
15	MF	CMR	Jean Makoun

No.	Pos.	Nation	Player
16	GK	FRA	Olivier Sorin
17	MF	FRA	Vincent Pajot
18	MF	BRA	Pedro Henrique
19	DF	ALB	Ermir Lenjani
21	MF	FRA	Benjamin André
22	DF	FRA	Sylvain Armand
23	MF	NOR	Anders Konradsen
24	MF	BIH	Sanjin Prcić
25	MF	FRA	Zana Allée
27	FW	CAF	Habib Habibou
28	DF	MKD	Gjoko Zajkov
29	DF	FRA	Romain Danzé (Captain)
30	GK	FRA	Christopher Dilo

==== Out on loan ====
Note: Flags indicate national team as defined under FIFA eligibility rules; some limited exceptions apply. Players may hold more than one non-FIFA nationality.

No.	Pos.	Nation	Player
—	GK	FRA	Abdoulaye Diallo (at Le Havre)
—	GK	LTU	Edvinas Gertmonas (at Atlantas)
—	DF	FRA	Cédric Hountondji (at Châteauroux)
—	MF	FRA	Adrien Hunou (at Clermont)

No.	Pos.	Nation	Player
—	MF	FRA	Axel Ngando (at Angers)
—	FW	GUI	Sadio Diallo (at Lorient)
—	FW	MLI	Cheick Fantamady Diarra (at Auxerre)
—	FW	FRA	Wesley Saïd (at Laval)

=== Ligue 1 ===
==== League table ====
Pos	Team	Pld	W	D	L	GF	GA	GD	Pts
7	Montpellier	38	16	8	14	46	39	+7	56
8	Lille	38	16	8	14	43	42	+1	56
9	Rennes	38	13	11	14	35	42	−7	50
10	Guingamp	38	15	4	19	41	55	−14	49
11	Nice	38	13	9	16	44	53	−9	48

Source: Ligue 1
Rules for classification: 1) points; 2) goal difference; 3) number of goals scored

==== Results summary ====
Overall								Home						Away					
Pld	W	D	L	GF	GA	GD	Pts	W	D	L	GF	GA	GD	W	D	L	GF	GA	GD
38	13	11	14	35	42	−7	50	8	5	6	22	22	0	5	6	8	13	20	−7

Last updated: 19 June 2015.
Source: Competitive matches

==== Results by round ====
Round	1	2	3	4	5	6	7	8	9	10	11	12	13	14	15	16	17	18	19	20	21	22	23	24	25	26	27	28	29	30	31	32	33	34	35	36	37	38
Ground	A	H	A	A	H	A	H	A	H	A	H	A	H	A	H	A	H	A	H	A	H	H	A	H	A	H	A	H	A	H	A	H	A	H	A	H	A	H
Result	L	W	D	W	D	L	L	L	W	D	W	D	W	W	W	W	L	L	L	D	D	L	L	D	L	D	W	W	L	D	W	W	D	W	D	L	L	L
Position	18	8	7	5	7	8	13	15	12	13	9	11	7	7	6	5	6	7	8	9	9	10	10	12	12	13	10	9	11	11	9	9	9	9	9	9	9	9

Source: Ligue1
A = Away; H = Home; W = Win; D = Draw; L = Loss

==== Matches ====
Win Draw Loss

10 August 2014 1	Lyon	2–0	Rennes	Lyon
17:00 CEST (UTC+02:00)	Ferri (yellow card) 56'; Malbranque 64'; Lacazette 74' (pen.); Rose (yellow card) 75'	Report	Henrique (yellow card) 32'	Stadium: Stade de Gerland; Attendance: 27,811; Referee: Benoît Millot

16 August 2014 2	Rennes	6–2	Evian	Rennes
20:00 CEST (UTC+02:00)	Toivonen 6', 57'; Mexer 39', 43'; Ntep 76', 87'	Report	Sorlin (yellow card) 23'; Wass 35', 83'	Stadium: Roazhon Park; Attendance: 17,591; Referee: Olivier Thual

24 August 2014 3	Saint-Étienne	0–0	Rennes	Saint-Étienne
17:00 CEST (UTC+02:00)	Corgnet (yellow card) 45+2'; Bayal Sall (yellow card) 88'	Report	Fernandes (yellow card) 30'; M'Bengue (yellow card) 51'; Armand (yellow card) 71'	Stadium: Stade Geoffroy-Guichard; Attendance: 30,967; Referee: Ruddy Buquet

30 August 2014 4	Caen	0–1	Rennes	Le Mans
20:00 CEST (UTC+02:00)	Kanté (yellow card) 16' (yellow-red card) 29'	Report	Pajot (yellow card) 33'; Armand (yellow card) 74'; Toivonen 88' (pen.)	Stadium: MMArena; Attendance: 12,767; Referee: Alexandre Castro

13 September 2014 5	Rennes	1–1	Paris Saint-Germain	Rennes
17:00 CEST (UTC+02:00)	Ntep 55'; M'Bengue (yellow card) 73'	Report	Camara 43'; Verratti (yellow card) 76'	Stadium: Stade de la Route de Lorient; Attendance: 27,194; Referee: Antony Gautier

20 September 2014 6	Marseille	3–0	Rennes	Marseille
17:00 CEST (UTC+02:00)	Gignac 50', 63'; N'Koulou (yellow card) 65'; Alessandrini 90+4'	Report	Armand (yellow card) 90+3'	Stadium: Stade Vélodrome; Attendance: 46,153; Referee: Stéphane Lannoy

23 September 2014 7	Rennes	0–3	Toulouse	Rennes
21:00 CEST (UTC+02:00)	Fernandes (yellow card) 10'; Habibou (yellow card) 22'; Prcić (yellow card) 45+1'	Report	Aguilar (yellow card) 18'; Pešić 42'; Diagné 57' (o.g.); Ben Yedder 61'; Trejo (yellow card) 89'	Stadium: Route de Lorient; Attendance: 17,182; Referee: Fredy Fautrel

28 September 2014 8	Bordeaux	2–1	Rennes	Bordeaux
14:00 CEST (UTC+02:00)	Mariano (yellow card) 44'; Khazri 73'; Touré 90+3'	Report	Habibou 80'; Henrique (yellow card) 89'	Stadium: Stade Chaban-Delmas; Attendance: 18,668; Referee: Benoît Bastien

4 October 2014 9	Rennes	2–0	Lens	Rennes
20:00 CEST (UTC+02:00)	Diagné (yellow card) 29'; Ntep 54', 84'	Report	Cyprien (yellow card) 61'	Stadium: Stade de la Route de Lorient; Attendance: 18,910; Referee: Sébastien Desiage

18 October 2014 10	Metz	0–0	Rennes	Metz
20:00 CEST (UTC+02:00)	Milán (yellow card) 12'; Sarr (yellow card) 66'	Report		Stadium: Stade Saint-Symphorien; Attendance: 18,074; Referee: Mikael Lesage

26 October 2014 11	Rennes	2–0	Lille	Rennes
14:00 CET (UTC+01:00)	Habibou 46'; Doucouré 54'; André (yellow card) 81'	Report	Sidibé (yellow card) 65'; Balmont (yellow card) 78'	Stadium: Route de Lorient; Attendance: 17,392; Referee: Philippe Kalt

2 November 2014 12	Nantes	1–1	Rennes	Nantes
14:00 CET (UTC+01:00)	Armand 21' (o.g.); Hansen (yellow card) 28'; Gomis (yellow card) 64'; Vizcarrondo (yellow card) 79'	Report	Pedro Henrique 4', (yellow card) 81'; Fernandes (yellow card) 14'; Danzé (yellow card) 67'	Stadium: Stade de la Beaujoire; Attendance: 31,893; Referee: Fredy Fautrel

7 November 2014 13	Rennes	1–0	Lorient	Rennes
20:30 CET (UTC+01:00)	Mexer (yellow card) 52'; Pedro Henrique (yellow card) 70', (goal) 89'; Armand (yellow card) 83'	Report	Lautoa (yellow card) 47'; Gassama (yellow card) 67'; Koné (yellow card) 69'	Stadium: Stade de la Route de Lorient; Attendance: 18,390; Referee: Wilfried Bien

22 November 2014 14	Guingamp	0–1	Rennes	Guingamp
20:00 CET (UTC+01:00)	Angoua (yellow card) 45'; Diallo (yellow card) 90+1'	Report	Ntep 36'; Mexer (yellow card) 52'; Danzé (yellow card) 55'; Fernandes (yellow card) 59'	Stadium: Stade du Roudourou; Attendance: 16,501; Referee: Bartolomeu Varela

29 November 2014 15	Rennes	2–0	Monaco	Rennes
20:00 CET (UTC+01:00)	Abdennour 10' (o.g.); Toivonen 19'; Doucouré (yellow card) 62'	Report	Raggi (yellow card) 52'; Fabinho (yellow card) 73'	Stadium: Stade de la Route de Lorient; Attendance: 17,213; Referee: Bastien

3 December 2014 16	Nice	1–2	Rennes	Nice
19:00 CET (UTC+01:00)	Rafetraniaina (yellow card) 27'; Gomis (yellow card) 56'; Cvitanich 83'	Report	Ntep 12'; Konradsen 49'; Brüls (yellow card) 87'	Stadium: Allianz Riviera; Attendance: 15,033; Referee: Alexandre Castro

6 December 2014 17	Rennes	0–4	Montpellier	Rennes
20:00 CET (UTC+01:00)	Hosiner (yellow card) 39'; André (yellow card) 70'	Report	Martin 23'; Lasne (yellow card) 26'; Sanson 55'; Barrios 60'; Mounier 90+2'	Stadium: Route de Lorient; Attendance: 16,123; Referee: Amaury Delerue

13 December 2014 18	Bastia	2–0	Rennes	Furiani
20:00 CET (UTC+01:00)	Squillaci (yellow card) 30'; Boudebouz 45+2'; Palmieri (yellow card) 56'; Cahuzac (yellow card) 61', (goal) 81'	Report	Konradsen (yellow card) 20'; Diagne (red card) 26'; Ntep (yellow card) 60'	Stadium: Stade Armand Cesari; Attendance: 11,121; Referee: Olivier Thual

20 December 2014 19	Rennes	1–3	Reims	Rennes
20:00 CET (UTC+01:00)	Mexer 45'; Danzé (yellow card) 83'; Konradsen (yellow card) 90'; Prcić (yellow card) 90+3'	Report	Roberge (yellow card) 44'; Charbonnier 66'; Oniangue (yellow card) 71'; Ngog (yellow card) 74'; Fortes 76' de Préville 90'	Stadium: Stade de la Route de Lorient; Attendance: 17,739; Referee: Fredy Fautrel

10 January 2015 20	Evian	1–1	Rennes	Annecy
20:00 CET (UTC+01:00)	Thomasson 62'; Olivier Sorlin (yellow card) 64'; Cambon (yellow card) 81'; Abdallah (yellow card) 90+1'	Report	Ntep 66'	Stadium: Parc des Sports; Attendance: 8,011; Referee: Antony Gautier

18 January 2015 21	Rennes	0–0	Saint-Étienne	Rennes
17:00 CET (UTC+01:00)	Fernandes (yellow card) 28'	Report	Mollo (yellow card) 30'	Stadium: Stade de la Route de Lorient; Attendance: 17,555; Referee: Stéphane Lannoy

25 January 2015 22	Rennes	1–4	Caen	Rennes
17:00 CET (UTC+01:00)	André 15'	Report	Privat 4'; Nangis 50'; Féret 85'; Da Silva 89'	Stadium: Roazhon Park; Attendance: 18,091; Referee: Sébastien Moreira

30 January 2015 23	Paris Saint-Germain	1–0	Rennes	Paris
20:30 CET (UTC+01:00)	Lavezzi 29'; Marquinhos (yellow card) 37'; Cabaye (yellow card) 56'	Report	Fernandes (yellow card) 28'	Stadium: Parc des Princes; Attendance: 44,955; Referee: Philippe Kalt

7 February 2015 24	Rennes	1–1	Marseille	Rennes
16:00 CET (UTC+01:00)	Toivonen 27', (yellow card) 83'; Henrique (yellow card) 39'	Report	Imbula (yellow card) 35'; Ocampos 60'; Morel (yellow card) 75'; Payet (yellow card) 83'; Lemina (red card) 83'	Stadium: Stade de la Route de Lorient; Attendance: 25,322; Referee: Amaury Delerue

14 February 2015 25	Toulouse	2–1	Rennes	Toulouse
20:00 CET (UTC+01:00)	Trejo 9'; Pešić 84'; Regattin (yellow card) 89'	Report	M'Bengue (yellow card) 62'; Toivonen 82'	Stadium: Stadium Municipal; Attendance: 14,786; Referee: Alexandre Castro

21 February 2015 26	Rennes	1–1	Bordeaux	Rennes
20:00 CET (UTC+01:00)	Ntep 11', (yellow card) 78'; Doucouré (yellow card) 43'; Moreira (yellow card) 80'	Report	Thelin (yellow card) 31'; Carrasso (yellow card) 49'; Chantôme (yellow card) 50'; Khazri 77' (pen.)	Stadium: Stade de la Route de Lorient; Attendance: 16,833; Referee: Mikael Lesage

28 February 2015 27	Lens	0–1	Rennes	Amiens
20:00 CET (UTC+01:00)	Kantari (yellow card) 62'; Guillaume (yellow card) 69'; El Jadeyaoui (yellow card) 90+1'	Report	Doucouré 36'; Habibou (yellow card) 90'	Stadium: Stade de la Licorne; Attendance: 7,549; Referee: Benoît Millot

7 March 2015 28	Rennes	1–0	Metz	Rennes
20:00 CET (UTC+01:00)	Ntep 19', (yellow card) 81'	Report	Palomino (yellow card) 90+2'	Stadium: Stade de la Route de Lorient; Attendance: 17,174; Referee: Antony Gautier

15 March 2015 29	Lille	3–0	Rennes	Villeneuve-d'Ascq
14:00 CET (UTC+01:00)	Origi 38', 63' (pen.), 72'; Pavard (yellow card) 44'	Report	Doucouré (yellow card) 42'	Stadium: Stade Pierre-Mauroy; Attendance: 34,727; Referee: Clément Turpin

21 March 2015 30	Rennes	0–0	Nantes	Rennes
20:00 CET (UTC+01:00)		Report	Bessat (yellow card) 67'; Alhadhur (yellow card) 89'	Stadium: Stade de la Route de Lorient; Attendance: 25,140; Referee: Wilfried Bien

4 April 2015 31	Lorient	0–3	Rennes	Lorient
20:00 CEST (UTC+02:00)	Le Goff (yellow card) 45'	Report	Mexer 17'; Fernandes (yellow card) 41'; Armand 43'; Doucouré 50'	Stadium: Stade du Moustoir; Attendance: 14,718; Referee: Sébastien Desiage

12 April 2015 32	Rennes	1–0	Guingamp	Rennes
17:00 CEST (UTC+02:00)	Pedro Henrique (yellow card) 36'; Doucouré (yellow card) 78'; Toivonen 80'; Fernandes (yellow card) 82'	Report	Giresse (yellow card) 15'; Diallo (yellow card) 47'; Yatabaré (red card) 75'; Mathis (yellow card) 78'	Stadium: Stade de la Route de Lorient; Attendance: 27,193; Referee: Antony Gautier

18 April 2015 33	Monaco	1–1	Rennes	Monaco
20:00 CEST (UTC+02:00)	Silva 28'; Elderson (yellow card) 90'	Report	André (yellow card) 16'; Henrique (yellow card) 57'; Habibou 87'	Stadium: Stade Louis II; Attendance: 6,527; Referee: Olivier Thual

25 April 2015 34	Rennes	2–1	Nice	Rennes
20:00 CEST (UTC+02:00)	André (yellow card) 32'; Prcić 47'; Konradsen 90'	Report	Bauthéac 22'; Eysseric (yellow card) 90+2'; Pléa (yellow card) 90+3'	Stadium: Stade de la Route de Lorient; Attendance: 20,675; Referee: Tony Chapron

2 May 2015 35	Montpellier	0–0	Rennes	Montpellier
20:00 CEST (UTC+02:00)	Bérigaud (yellow card) 31'; Hilton (red card) 90+2'	Report		Stadium: Stade de la Mosson; Attendance: 12,074; Referee: Frank Schneider

9 May 2015 36	Rennes	0–1	Bastia	Rennes
20:00 CEST (UTC+02:00)	Doucouré (yellow card) 34'; Fernandes (yellow card) 35'; Ntep (yellow card) 61'; Prcić (yellow card) 74'	Report	Cahuzac (yellow card) 34'; Kamano (yellow card) 37' (yellow-red card); Danic 78', (yellow card) 86'	Stadium: Stade de la Route de Lorient; Attendance: 20,368; Referee: Saïd Ennjimi

16 May 2015 37	Reims	1–0	Rennes	Reims
21:00 CEST (UTC+02:00)	Oniangue (yellow card) 8'; Mfulu (yellow card) 37'; Charbonnier 60' (pen.)	Report	Mexer (yellow card) 59'; Ntep (yellow card) 67'	Stadium: Stade Auguste Delaune; Attendance: 16,712; Referee: Stéphane Lannoy

23 May 2015 38	Rennes	0–1	Lyon	Rennes
21:00 CEST (UTC+02:00)		Report	N'Jie 86'	Stadium: Stade de la Route de Lorient; Attendance: 26,281; Referee: Philippe Kalt

=== Coupe de la Ligue ===
28 October 2014 Round of 32	Rennes	2–1	Marseille	Rennes
20:55 CEST (UTC+02:00)	Konradsen 60'; N'Koulou (yellow card) 43'; Barrada (yellow card) 48'; Ntep (red card) 63'; Habibou (yellow card) 72'; Hosiner 90+3'	Report	Batshuayi 19'; Dja Djédjé (red card) 63'	Stadium: Stade de la Route de Lorient; Attendance: 26,660; Referee: Saïd Ennjimi; Man of the Match: yes

17 December 2014 Round of 16	Rennes	1–0	US Créteil	Rennes
21:00 CET (UTC+01:00)	Armand 69'	Report	Ilunga (yellow card) 6'; Andriatsima (yellow card) 28'; Seck (yellow card) 64'	Stadium: Roazhon Park; Attendance: 12,300; Referee: Ruddy Buquet; Man of the Match: yes

13 January 2015 Quarter-finals	Bastia	3–1	Rennes	Furiani
18:40 CET (UTC+01:00)	Djiku (yellow card) 13'; Cahuzac (yellow card) 41'; Squillaci 46'; Danzé 71' (o.g.); Marange (yellow card) 73'; Cissé 90'	Report	Armand 12'; Konradsen (yellow card) 48' (yellow-red card) 65'; Lenjani (red card) 76'	Stadium: Stade Armand Cesari; Attendance: 4,836; Referee: Clément Turpin

=== Coupe de France ===
4 January 2015 Round of 64	USL Dunkerque	1–2	Rennes	Valenciennes
15:15 CET (UTC+01:00)	Aabiza 3'; Senneville (yellow card) 44'	1, 2	Doucouré 2', 27'; Pedro Henrique (yellow card) 72'; Moreira (yellow card) 82'	Stadium: Stade du Hainaut; Attendance: 3,000; Referee: Benoît Millot

22 January 2015 Round of 32	Rennes	1–1 (a.e.t.) (5–4 p)	Reims	Rennes
21:00 CET (UTC+01:00)	Armand 29' (pen.); Konradsen (yellow card) 64'	Report 1, 2	Kyei 70'; Charbonnier (yellow card) 90'	Stadium: Stade de la Route de Lorient; Attendance: 8,566; Referee: Sébastien Desiage
	Penalties
	Danzé (penalty scored); Fernandes (penalty scored); Habibou (penalty missed); Henrique (penalty scored); Armand (penalty missed); Doucouré (penalty scored); Konradsen (penalty scored)		(penalty scored) Bourillon; (penalty scored) Charbonnier; (penalty scored) Courtet; (penalty missed) Kyei; (penalty missed) Devaux; (penalty scored) Conte; (penalty missed) Mfulu

10 February 2015 Round of 16	Monaco	3–1	Rennes	Monaco
12:00 CET (UTC+1)	Touré 9'; Wallace 11'; Abdennour (yellow card) 14'; Martial 67' (pen.)	Summary	Pedro Henrique 34'	Stadium: Stade Louis II; Attendance: 4,000; Referee: Tony Chapron
