= 2015–16 Stade Rennais FC season =

Rennes
2015–16 season
- Chairman: René Ruello
- Manager: Philippe Montanier
- Stadium: Roazhon Park
- Ligue 1: 8th
- Coupe de France: Round of 32
- Coupe de la Ligue: Round of 16
- Top goalscorer: League: Ousmane Dembélé (12); All: Ousmane Dembélé (12)
- Highest home attendance: 29,060 vs Nantes (6 March 2016)
- Lowest home attendance: 9,595 vs FBBP 01 (19 January 2016)
Home colours	Away colours	Third colours

The 2015–16 Stade Rennais season was the 115th professional season of the club since its creation in 1901.

== Players ==
French teams are limited to four players without EU citizenship. Hence, the squad list includes only the principal nationality of each player; several non-European players on the squad have dual citizenship with an EU country. Also, players from the ACP countries—countries in Africa, the Caribbean, and the Pacific that are signatories to the Cotonou Agreement—are not counted against non-EU quotas due to the Kolpak ruling.

=== Current squad ===
As of 1 February 2016.

Note: Flags indicate national team as defined under FIFA eligibility rules; some limited exceptions apply. Players may hold more than one non-FIFA nationality.

No.	Pos.	Nation	Player
1	GK	FRA	Benoît Costil
2	DF	ALG	Mehdi Zeffane
3	DF	SEN	Cheikh M'Bengue
4	DF	MOZ	Mexer
5	DF	POR	Pedro Mendes
6	MF	SUI	Gelson Fernandes
7	FW	FRA	Paul-Georges Ntep
9	FW	RSA	Kermit Erasmus
10	FW	POL	Kamil Grosicki
11	MF	COL	Juan Quintero (on loan from Porto)
12	DF	FRA	Steven Moreira
13	FW	CIV	Giovanni Sio
14	DF	SEN	Fallou Diagne
16	GK	FRA	Olivier Sorin

No.	Pos.	Nation	Player
17	MF	FRA	Jérémie Boga (on loan from Chelsea)
18	FW	BRA	Pedro Henrique
19	DF	FRA	Dimitri Cavaré
20	MF	MLI	Yacouba Sylla
21	MF	FRA	Benjamin André
22	DF	FRA	Sylvain Armand (vice-captain)
23	MF	FRA	Ousmane Dembélé
24	DF	GUF	Ludovic Baal
28	MF	FRA	Yoann Gourcuff
29	DF	FRA	Romain Danzé (captain)
30	GK	LTU	Edvinas Gertmonas
35	MF	FRA	Nicolas Janvier
40	GK	SEN	Abdoulaye Diallo

=== Out on loan ===
Note: Flags indicate national team as defined under FIFA eligibility rules; some limited exceptions apply. Players may hold more than one non-FIFA nationality.

No.	Pos.	Nation	Player
—	DF	MKD	Gjoko Zajkov (at Charleroi)
—	DF	ALB	Ermir Lenjani (at Nantes)
—	DF	FRA	Cédric Hountondji (at Auxerre)
—	MF	FRA	Adrien Hunou (at Clermont)
—	MF	BIH	Sanjin Prcić (at Torino)

No.	Pos.	Nation	Player
—	MF	BEL	Christian Brüls (at Standard Liège)
—	FW	FRA	Wesley Saïd (at Dijon)
—	FW	AUT	Philipp Hosiner (at 1. FC Köln)
—	FW	SWE	Ola Toivonen (at Sunderland)

== Transfers ==
=== Transfers in ===
Date	Pos.	Player	Age	Moved from	Fee	Notes
1 July 2015	DF	(French Guiana) Ludovic Baal	29	(France) Lens	Free Transfer	
1 July 2015	FW	(Ivory Coast) Giovanni Sio	26	(Switzerland) Basel	Undisclosed	
1 July 2015	MF	(Mali) Yacouba Sylla	24	(England) Aston Villa	Undisclosed	
6 July 2015	DF	(Portugal) Pedro Mendes	24	(Italy) Parma	Free Transfer	
12 August 2015	DF	(Algeria) Mehdi Zeffane	23	(France) Lyon	Undisclosed	
14 September 2015	MF	(France) Yoann Gourcuff	29	Unattached	Free Transfer	
28 January 2016	FW	(South Africa) Kermit Erasmus	25	(South Africa) Orlando Pirates	Undisclosed	

=== Loans in ===
Date	Pos.	Player	Age	Loaned from	On loan until	Notes
31 August 2015	MF	(France) Jérémie Boga	18	(England) Chelsea	30 June 2016	
31 August 2015	MF	(Colombia) Juan Quintero	22	(Portugal) Porto	30 June 2016	

=== Transfers out ===
Date	Pos.	Player	Age	Moved to	Fee	Notes
1 July 2015	MF	(France) Vincent Pajot	24	(France) Saint-Étienne	Free Transfer	
1 July 2015	MF	(Guinea) Sadio Diallo	24	(France) Bastia	Undisclosed	
1 July 2015	MF	(Cameroon) Jean Makoun	32	Unattached	Released	Later joined (Turkey) Antalyaspor
1 July 2015	GK	(France) Christopher Dilo	21	(France) Dijon	Free Transfer	
3 August 2015	MF	(France) Zana Allée	21	(France) AC Ajaccio	Free Transfer	
16 August 2015	MF	(Norway) Anders Konradsen	25	(Norway) Rosenborg	Undisclosed	
31 August 2015	MF	(France) Axel Ngando	22	(France) Bastia	Undisclosed	
1 February 2016	MF	(France) Abdoulaye Doucoure	23	(England) Watford	£8M	

=== Loans out ===
Date	Pos.	Player	Age	Loaned to	Return date	Notes
1 July 2015	FW	(Austria) Philipp Hosiner	26	(Germany) 1. FC Köln	30 June 2016	
17 August 2015	DF	(Albania) Ermir Lenjani	26	(France) Nantes	30 June 2016	
17 August 2015	MF	(Belgium) Christian Brüls	26	(Belgium) Standard Liège	30 June 2016	
25 August 2015	DF	(North Macedonia) Gjoko Zajkov	20	(Belgium) Charleroi	30 June 2016	
26 August 2015	MF	(France) Adrien Hunou	21	(France) Clermont	30 June 2016	
28 August 2015	MF	(Sweden) Ola Toivonen	29	(England) Sunderland	30 June 2016	
31 August 2015	MF	(Bosnia and Herzegovina) Sanjin Prcić	21	(Italy) Perugia	30 June 2016	
31 August 2015	DF	(France) Cédric Hountondji	21	(France) Auxerre	30 June 2016	
22 January 2016	FW	(Central African Republic) Habib Habibou	28	(Turkey) Gaziantepspor	30 June 2016	
31 August 2015	FW	(France) Wesley Saïd	20	(France) Dijon	30 June 2016	

== Competitions ==
=== Ligue 1 ===
==== League table ====
Pos	Team	Pld	W	D	L	GF	GA	GD	Pts	Qualification or relegation
6	Saint-Étienne	38	17	7	14	42	37	+5	58	Qualification for the Europa League third qualifying round (Note: Since the winners of the 2015–16 Coupe de France and the 2015–16 Coupe de la Ligue, Paris Saint-Germain, qualified for European competition based on their league position, the spot awarded to the Coupe de France winners (Europa League group stage) was passed to the fourth-placed team and the spot awarded to the Coupe de la Ligue winners (Europa League third qualifying round) was passed to the sixth-placed team. The fifth-placed team received the spot in Europa League third qualifying round originally designated to the fourth-placed team.)
7	Caen	38	16	6	16	39	52	−13	54	
8	Rennes	38	13	13	12	52	54	−2	52	
9	Angers	38	13	11	14	40	38	+2	50	
10	Bastia	38	14	8	16	36	42	−6	50	

Source: Ligue 1, Soccerway
Rules for classification: 1) Points; 2) Goal difference; 3) Goals scored; 4) Head-to-head points; 5) Head-to-head goal difference; 6) Fairplay ranking.

==== Results summary ====
Overall								Home						Away					
Pld	W	D	L	GF	GA	GD	Pts	W	D	L	GF	GA	GD	W	D	L	GF	GA	GD
38	13	13	12	52	54	−2	52	6	7	6	25	25	0	7	6	6	27	29	−2

Last updated: 10 May 2016.
Source: Competitive matches

==== Results by round ====
Round	1	2	3	4	5	6	7	8	9	10	11	12	13	14	15	16	17	18	19	20	21	22	23	24	25	26	27	28	29	30	31	32	33	34	35	36	37	38
Ground	A	H	A	H	A	H	A	H	A	H	A	H	A	H	A	H	A	H	A	H	A	H	A	H	A	H	A	A	H	H	A	H	A	H	H	A	A	H
Result	L	W	W	W	W	D	D	D	D	L	D	L	W	D	D	L	D	D	W	D	W	W	L	L	D	W	L	W	W	D	W	W	L	L	D	L	L	L
Position	14	9	5	3	2	2	3	3	4	7	8	10	8	8	8	10	10	10	7	8	6	4	6	9	9	7	8	6	5	5	5	4	5	7	7	7	7	8

Source: Ligue1
A = Away; H = Home; W = Win; D = Draw; L = Loss

==== Matches ====
Win Draw Loss

8 August 2015 1	Bastia	2–1	Rennes	Furiani
21:00 CEST (UTC+02:00)	Ayité 50'; Kamano 69'; Brandão (red card) 78'	Report	Sio 39', (yellow card) 90+3'	Stadium: Stade Armand Cesari; Attendance: 14,702; Referee: Sébastien Moreira

15 August 2015 2	Rennes	1–0	Montpellier	Rennes
20:00 CEST (UTC+02:00)	Sio (yellow card) 45+1'; Pedro Henrique (yellow card) 58'; Fernandes (yellow card) 60'; Grosicki 85'	Report	Jourdren (yellow card) 45+1'	Stadium: Roazhon Park; Attendance: 18,748; Referee: Mikael Lesage

22 August 2015 3	Lyon	1–2	Rennes	Lyon
17:00 CEST (UTC+02:00)	Fekir 12', (yellow card) 85'	Report	Pedro Henrique 7', (yellow card) 59'; Diagne (yellow card) 48'; Zefanne 56'; Fernandes (yellow card) 58'	Stadium: Stade de Gerland; Attendance: 31,470; Referee: Ruddy Buquet

29 August 2015 4	Rennes	3–1	Toulouse	Rennes
20:00 CEST (UTC+02:00)	Yago 17' (o.g.); Fernandes (yellow card) 55'; Armand 68'; Pedro Henrique (yellow card) 75'; Sio 90'	Report	Braithwaite 5'; Akpa Akpro (yellow card) 55'; Tisserand (yellow card) 65'; Goicoechea (yellow card) 67'	Stadium: Roazhon Park; Attendance: 18,560; Referee: Benoît Millot

13 September 2015 5	Nantes	0–2	Rennes	Nantes
17:00 CEST (UTC+02:00)	Djidji (yellow card) 49'; Adryan (red card) 52'; Dubois (yellow card) 56'; Sigþórsson (red card) 78'	Report	Sylla (yellow card) 37'; Ntep (yellow card) 45', (goal) 67'; Mexer (yellow card) 64'; Sio 89'	Stadium: Stade de la Beaujoire; Attendance: 27,262; Referee: Stéphane Lannoy

18 September 2015 6	Rennes	1–1	Lille	Rennes
20:30 CEST (UTC+02:00)	Mendes (yellow card) 51'; Ntep 74'; Armand (yellow card) 79'; Sio (yellow card) 90+5'	Report	Boufal (yellow card) 45', (goal) 49'; Baša (yellow card) 52'; Mavuba (yellow card) 69'; Enyeama (red card) 69'; Bauthéac (yellow card) 90+5'	Stadium: Roazhon Park; Attendance: 27,391; Referee: Stéphane Jochem

23 September 2015 7	Gazélec Ajaccio	1–1	Rennes	Ajaccio, Corsica
19:00 CEST (UTC+02:00)	Larbi 45+1'	Report	Sio (yellow card) 44', (goal) 89'	Stadium: Stade Ange Casanova; Attendance: 3,576; Referee: Fredy Fautrel

26 September 2015 8	Rennes	1–1	Troyes	Rennes
20:00 CEST (UTC+02:00)	Sylla (yellow card) 45+1' (yellow-red card) 90+3'; Pedro Henrique (yellow card) 68'; Diagne 71'	Report	Pi 11'; Karaboué (yellow card) 23'; Perea (yellow card) 45'; Nivet (yellow card) 75'	Stadium: Roazhon Park; Attendance: 20,170; Referee: Johann Hamel

4 October 2015 9	Monaco	1–1	Rennes	Fontvieille
14:00 CEST (UTC+02:00)	Raggi (yellow card) 43'; Wallace 51', (yellow card) 90'; Fabinho (yellow card) 64'	Report	Pedro Henrique (yellow card) 8'; Doucouré 41'; Grosicki (yellow card) 77'	Stadium: Stade Louis II; Attendance: 5,552; Referee: Tony Chapron

18 October 2015 10	Rennes	1–4	Nice	Rennes
21:00 CEST (UTC+02:00)	Fernandes (yellow card) 37'; Sio (yellow card) 59'; Grosicki 88'	Report	Bodmer 14'; Germain (yellow card) 52'; Ben Arfa 53'; Traoré (yellow card) 71', (goal) 75'; Benrahma 80'	Stadium: Roazhon Park; Attendance: 21,709; Referee: Benoît Millot

24 October 2015 11	Lorient	1–1	Rennes	Lorient
17:00 CEST (UTC+02:00)	Guerreiro 25'; Koné (yellow card) 62' (yellow-red card) 67'	Report	Sio (yellow card) 32' (yellow-red card) 85'; Grosicki 68'	Stadium: Stade du Moustoir

30 October 2015 12	Rennes	0–1	Paris Saint-Germain	Rennes
20:30 CEST (UTC+01:00)		Report	Di María 75'	Stadium: Roazhon Park; Referee: Fredy Fautrel

6 November 2015 13	Angers	0–2	Rennes	Angers
20:30 CET (UTC+01:00)	Andreu (yellow card) 90+3'	Report	Doucouré 4'; Fernandes (yellow card) 54' (goal) 61'; Grosicki (yellow card) 86'	Stadium: Stade Jean-Bouin; Attendance: 15,202; Referee: Clément Turpin

22 November 2015 14	Rennes	2–2	Bordeaux	Rennes
17:00 CET (UTC+01:00)	Dembélé 32'; Grosicki 75'; Sio (yellow card) 87'; Armand (yellow card) 90'	Report	Khazri (yellow card) 23'; Crivelli 41' (yellow card) 90'; Contento 78'; Pallois (red card) 90'	Stadium: Roazhon Park; Attendance: 23,289; Referee: Sébastien Moreira

28 November 2015 15	Reims	2–2	Rennes	Reims
20:00 CET (UTC+01:00)	De Préville (yellow card) 30', (goal) 67'; Kankava (yellow card) 35' (yellow-red card) 64'; Mandi 58'; Signorino (yellow card) 65'; Devaux (yellow card) 88'	Report	Boga 44'; Sylla (yellow card) 27'; Moreira (yellow card) 61'; Sio (yellow card) 66'; Grosicki 81'; Fernandes (yellow card) 84'	Stadium: Stade Auguste Delaune; Attendance: 9,289; Referee: Hakim Ben El Hadj

3 December 2015 16	Rennes	0–1	Marseille	Rennes
21:00 CET (UTC+01:00)	Moreira (yellow card) 1'; André (yellow card) 51'; Mexer (yellow card) 55'; Armand (yellow card) 88'	Report	Cabella 21', (yellow card) 25'; Mandanda (yellow card) 90'	Stadium: Roazhon Park; Attendance: 23,424; Referee: Tony Chapron

6 December 2015 17	Saint-Étienne	1–1	Rennes	Saint Étienne
21:00 CET (UTC+01:00)	Maupay (yellow card) 69'; Lemoine (yellow card) 75'; Eysseric 78' (pen.)	Report	Pedro Henrique 40', (yellow card) 41'; Armand (yellow card) 80'; Sylla (yellow card) 86'	Stadium: Stade Geoffroy-Guichard; Attendance: 26,668; Referee: Nicolas Rainville

11 December 2015 18	Rennes	1–1	Caen	Rennes
20:30 CET (UTC+01:00)	Doucouré (yellow card) 51'; Quintero 62'	Report	Imorou (red card) 36'; Ben Youssef 79'	Stadium: Roazhon Park; Attendance: 23,471; Referee: Johan Hamel

19 December 2015 19	Guingamp	0–2	Rennes	Guingamp
20:00 CET (UTC+01:00)	Diallo (yellow card) 45+1'	Report	Pedro Henrique (yellow card) 62'; Dembélé 63'; Sio 77'; Fernandes (yellow card) 81'	Stadium: Stade du Roudourou; Attendance: 16,196; Referee: Benoît Millot

9 January 2016 20	Rennes	2–2	Lorient	Rennes
20:00 CET (UTC+01:00)	Dembélé 35'; Boga 41'	Report	Diagne 4' (o.g.); Waris 22'; N'Dong (yellow card) 47'	Stadium: Roazhon Park; Attendance: 26,936; Referee: Frank Schneider

16 January 2016 21	Troyes	2–4	Rennes	Troyes
20:00 CET (UTC+01:00)	Camus 7'; Jean 15'; Ngcongca (yellow card) 20'; Dabo (yellow card) 38'; Cabot (yellow card) 51'	Report	Diagne (yellow card) 14', (goal) 21', 39' (pen.); Dembélé 28'; Grosicki 81'	Stadium: Stade de l'Aube; Attendance: 10,292; Referee: Saïd Ennjimi

22 January 2016 22	Rennes	1–0	Gazélec Ajaccio	Rennes
20:30 CET (UTC+01:00)	Diagne (yellow card) 60'; M'Bengue (yellow card) 67'; Danzé (yellow card) 69'; Filippi 90+1' (o.g.)	Report	Coeff (yellow card) 45'; Lemoigne (yellow card) 62'; Đoković (yellow card) 69'	Stadium: Roazhon Park; Attendance: 18,022; Referee: Sébastien Moreira

31 January 2016 23	Bordeaux	4–0	Rennes	Bordeaux
17:00 CET (UTC+01:00)	Diabaté 29', 51'; Guilbert (yellow card) 49'; Contento (yellow card) 59'; Rolán 67'; Touré 90+2'	Report	André (yellow card) 71'	Stadium: Nouveau Stade de Bordeaux; Attendance: 19,883; Referee: Mikael Lesage

4 February 2016 24	Rennes	0–1	Saint-Étienne	Rennes
21:00 CET (UTC+01:00)	Sylla (yellow card) 26'; Mexer (yellow card) 73'	Report	Bahebeck (yellow card) 20'; Sall (yellow card) 71', (goal) 74'	Stadium: Roazhon Park; Attendance: 18,049; Referee: Benoît Millot

7 February 2016 25	Lille	1–1	Rennes	Villeneuve d'Ascq
14:00 CET (UTC+01:00)	Éder 42'; Boufal (yellow card) 66' (yellow-red card) 71'; Soumaoro (yellow card) 87'	Report	Danzé (yellow card) 18'; Mendes (yellow card) 23'; M'Bengue (yellow card) 76'; Zeffane (yellow card) 85'; Dembélé 89' (pen.)	Stadium: Stade Pierre-Mauroy; Attendance: 29,012; Referee: Johan Hamel

12 February 2016 26	Rennes	1–0	Angers	Rennes
20:30 CET (UTC+01:00)	Bouka Moutou 90+2' (o.g.)	Report	Yattara (yellow card) 23'	Stadium: Roazhon Park; Attendance: 18,350; Referee: Stéphane Lannoy

21 February 2016 27	Caen	1–0	Rennes	Caen
17:00 CET (UTC+01:00)	Delort (yellow card) 47'; Ntibazonkiza 54'	Report	Mendes (yellow card) 24'	Stadium: Stade Michel d'Ornano; Attendance: 15,455; Referee: Tony Chapron

27 February 2016 28	Toulose	1–2	Rennes	Toulouse
20:00 CET (UTC+01:00)	Bodiger (yellow card) 57'; Akpa Akpro (yellow card) 74'; Ben Yedder 78'	Report	Dembélé 80'; Grosicki 90+2'	Stadium: Stade Municipal; Attendance: 11,627; Referee: Stéphane Jochem

6 March 2016 29	Rennes	4–1	Nantes	Rennes
17:00 CET (UTC+1)	Dembélé 1', 23', 45'; Grosicki 15'; Armand (yellow card) 28'; Sio (yellow card) 35' (yellow-red card) 67'	Report	Sigþórsson (yellow card) 24'; Vizcarrondo (yellow card) 45'; Adryan 60'; Audel (yellow card) 79'	Stadium: Roazhon Park; Attendance: 29,060; Referee: Ruddy Buquet

13 March 2016 30	Rennes	2–2	Lyon	Rennes
21:00 CET (UTC+1)	Mendes (yellow card) 12'; Pedro Henrique (yellow card) 20'; Fernandes (yellow card) 50'; Dembélé (yellow card) 53'; Diagne (yellow card) 65', (goal) 70'; Rafael 82' (o.g.)	Report	Rafael (yellow card) 19'; Gonalons (yellow card) 32'; Ghezzal 33', (yellow card) 71'; Koné (yellow card) 53'; Lacazette 55'	Stadium: Roazhon Park; Attendance: 25,830; Referee: Frank Schneider

18 March 2016 31	Marseille	2–5	Rennes	Marseille
20:30 CET (UTC+01:00)	Rolando (yellow card) 8', (goal) 50'; Thauvin 20'; Batshuayi (yellow card) 32'	Report	Gourcuff 4', 59'; Diagne 9'; Dembélé 14'; André (yellow card) 29'; Sio 77'	Stadium: Stade Vélodrome; Attendance: 40,077; Referee: Sébastien Moreira

2 April 2016 32	Rennes	3–1	Stade Reims	Rennes
20:00 CEST (UTC+02:00)	Grosicki 12'; Dembélé 15', 67'; Diagne (yellow card) 61'	Report	Mandi 59'	Stadium: Roazhon Park; Attendance: 24,828; Referee: Saïd Ennjimi

10 April 2016 33	Nice	3–0	Rennes	Nice
17:00 CEST (UTC+02:00)	Ben Arfa 33' (pen.), 40', 56'	Report		Stadium: Allianz Riviera; Attendance: 23,622; Referee: Clément Turpin

17 April 2016 34	Rennes	0–3	Guingamp	Rennes
17:00 CEST (UTC+02:00)	Mexer (yellow card) 5'; Sio (yellow card) 89'; Diagne (yellow card) 90'	Report	Diallo (yellow card) 18', (goal) 63'; Kerbrat (yellow card) 56'; Briand 73'; Sankharé 77'	Stadium: Roazhon Park; Attendance: 29,068; Referee: Mikael Lesage

24 April 2016 35	Rennes	1–1	Monaco	Rennes
21:00 CEST (UTC+02:00)	Sio 80'; Danzé (yellow card) 86'	Report	Costa 14'; Fabinho (yellow card) 79'; Carrillo (yellow card) 90'; Wallace (yellow card) 90'	Stadium: Roazhon Park; Attendance: 23,251; Referee: Fredy Fautrel

29 April 2016 36	Paris Saint-Germain	4–0	Rennes	Paris
20:30 CEST (UTC+02:00)	Maxwell 50'; Ibrahimović 54', 78'; Aurier (yellow card) 57'; Cavani 90+1'	Report	Gnagnon (yellow card) 34'	Stadium: Parc des Princes; Attendance: 45,341; Referee: Amaury Delerue

7 May 2016 37	Montpellier	2–0	Rennes	Montpellier
21:00 CEST (UTC+02:00)	Ninga 58'; Boudebouz 70'	Report		Stadium: Stade de la Mosson; Attendance: 13,004; Referee: Sébastien Moreira

14 May 2016 38	Rennes	1–2	Bastia	Rennes
21:00 CEST (UTC+02:00)				Stadium: Roazhon Park

=== Coupe de la Ligue ===
27 October 2015 Round of 32	Bastia	0–1	Rennes	Furiani
21:00 CET (UTC+01:00)	Coulibaly (yellow card) 40'; Peybernes (yellow card) 60'	Report	Mendes (yellow card) 27'; Doucouré 59'	Stadium: Stade Armand Cesari; Attendance: 3,048; Referee: Stéphane Lannoy

15 December 2015 Round of 16	Rennes	1–3	Toulouse	Rennes
21:00 CET (UTC+01:00)	Sylla (red card) 16'; Fernandes (yellow card) 21'; Diagne 57' (pen.)	Report	Ben Yedder 13', 32'; Regattin 84'; Machach (yellow card) 90'	Stadium: Roazhon Park; Attendance: 14,672; Referee: Benoît Bastien

=== Coupe de France ===
4 January 2016 Round of 64	Nice	2–2 (a.e.t.) (6–7 p)	Rennes	Nice
20:45 CET (UTC+01:00)	Mendy 38'; Koziello (yellow card) 41' (yellow-red card) 74'; Ben Arfa 117' (pen.)	Report	Diagne (yellow card) 42'; Pedro Henrique (yellow card) 58'; Fernandes (yellow card) 81'; Boga 83'; André 114'; Armand (yellow card) 119'; Danzé (red card) 116'	Stadium: Allianz Riviera; Attendance: 7,749; Referee: Clément Turpin
	Penalties
	Ben Arfa (penalty scored); Seri (penalty scored); Mendy (penalty scored); Wallyson (penalty missed); Baysse (penalty scored); Genevois (penalty scored); Honorat (penalty missed); Boscagli (penalty scored); Lloris (penalty missed)		(penalty missed) Quintero; (penalty scored) Boga; (penalty scored) Diagne; (penalty scored) Dembélé; (penalty scored) Armand; (penalty scored) Janvier; (penalty missed) André; (penalty scored) M'Bengue; (penalty scored) Fernandes

19 January 2016 Round of 32	Rennes	1–3	FBBP 01	Rennes
18:00 CET (UTC+01:00)	Armand (yellow card) 10'; Moreira 21'	Report	Bègue 48'; Boussaha 80'; Sané 90'	Stadium: Roazhon Park; Attendance: 9,595; Referee: Antony Gautier
