= Kamil Grosicki =

Polish footballer (born 1988)

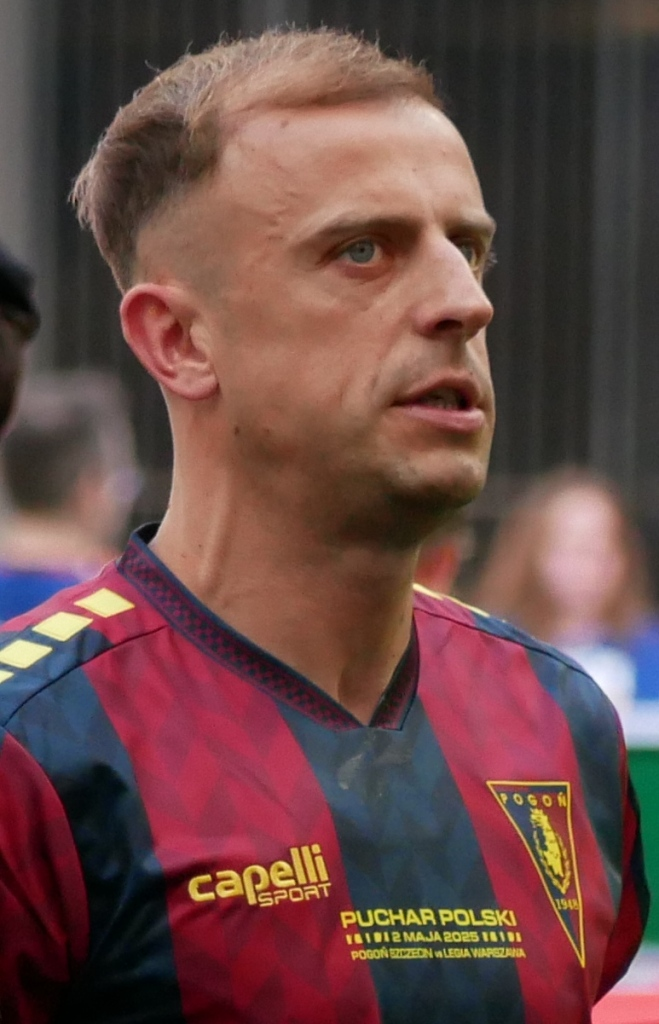
- Grosicki with Pogoń Szczecin (2025)

Personal information
- Full name: Kamil Paweł Grosicki
- Date of birth: 8 June 1988 (age 38)
- Place of birth: Szczecin, Poland
- Height: 1.80 m (5 ft 11 in)
- Position: Winger

Team information
- Current team: Pogoń Szczecin
- Number: 11

Youth career
- Pogoń Szczecin

Senior career*
Years	Team	Apps	(Gls)
2006–2007	Pogoń Szczecin	26	(3)
2007–2009	Legia Warsaw	11	(1)
2008	→ Sion (loan)	8	(2)
2009	→ Jagiellonia (loan)	13	(4)
2009–2011	Jagiellonia	45	(10)
2011–2014	Sivasspor	90	(14)
2014–2017	Rennes	81	(13)
2017–2020	Hull City	119	(24)
2020–2021	West Bromwich Albion	17	(1)
2021–	Pogoń Szczecin	164	(50)

International career
2006–2007	Poland U19		
2007–2010	Poland U21	12	(2)
2008–2026	Poland	101	(17)
- * Club domestic league appearances and goals as of 21:16, 25 October 2026 (UTC)

Kamil Paweł Grosicki (Polish pronunciation: [ˈkamil ɡrɔˈɕit͡skʲi]; born 8 June 1988) is a Polish professional footballer who plays as a winger for and captains Ekstraklasa club Pogoń Szczecin. A full international footballer for Poland with 101 caps from 2008 to 2026, he represented the country in the UEFA European Championship in 2012, 2016, and 2024, as well as the FIFA World Cup in 2018 and 2022.

== Club career ==
=== Pogoń Szczecin ===
Grosicki spent his entire youth career in Pogoń Szczecin before joining the reserve team in 2005, where he scored eight goals. He later joined the main squad of Pogoń Szczecin, followed by signing a five-year contract with them. Grosicki was assigned with a squad number 21. On 6 May, he played his first match in Pogoń's starting XI on 6 May 2006 in a goalless draw against Arka Gdynia, during which he came off the bench in 86th minute, replacing Andradina. The match resulted in a draw. In a 3–0 victory against Górnik Łęczna on 23 September 2006, Grosicki came off the bench in the 88th minute and scored a goal four minutes later. One month later, on 28 October, he scored Pogoń's only goal in a 1–3 loss against Zagłębie Lubin. Grosicki also scored on 1 December 2006 in a 2–2 Ekstraklasa Cup draw against Arka Gdynia.

Throughout the 2006–07 season, Grosocki made 26 appearances (21 times in Ekstraklasa and 5 times in Ekstraklasa Cup), scoring three goals – of which two were scored in Ekstraklasa and one in Ekstraklasa Cup – in total. Pogoń ended that season in the last place. Due to the liquidation of the Pogoń's company, the club started the next season in IV liga.

=== Legia Warsaw and loan moves ===
On 19 June 2007, Grosicki transferred to Legia Warsaw on a four-year contract. He made his debut on 29 July in a 1–0 victory against Cracovia as a substitute in the 78th minute, replacing Bartłomiej Grzelak. On 25 July, Grosicki scored his first goal for the club in a 5–0 victory against Zagłębie Sosnowiec, which also the only goal he scored that season. That match marked his debut in the starting line-up as well. During that season, he developed issues due to a gambling addiction. His gambling loans were being paid by a club at that time. At the end of November 2007, he underwent an addiction therapy in a rehabilitation centre in Stare Juchy, which lasted for around one month.

In February 2008, Grosicki moved to Swiss club FC Sion on loan until the end of the year. He debuted on 16 March in a 2–1 victory against FC Basel. Two weeks later, on 30 March, Grosicki scored the first goal for his new club in a 1–0 victory against FC Aarau.

=== Jagiellonia Białystok ===
In February 2009, Jagiellonia Białystok took Grosicki on loan until the end of the 2008–09 season, which costed 63,000 PLN. The club also secured the right to buy him for 500,000 PLN. With Jagiellonia, he was given squad number 9. On 28 February, Grosicki made his first appearance for the club in a 3–0 victory against Arka Gdynia. On 13 March, he played in a match against Legia Warsaw, but had a clause in his contract that forbade him from playing against Legia for breaking, which Jagiellonia needed to pay 50,000 PLN. He scored his first goal for the team on 20 March 2009 in a 1–1 draw against Piast Gliwice.

Grosicki became a key player for Jagiellonia. Across the 2008–09 season, he played in thirteen matches, scored four goals, and recorded four assists. Jagiellonia ended that season in the eighth place. On 19 April 2009, he helped his club win the match with Ruch Chorzów by scoring the sole goal in that game.

On 8 June 2009, it was announced that Grosicki had signed a three-year contract with Jagiellonia, starting from July 2009, for a reported fee of 500,000 PLN. During the winter break, two Swiss clubs FC Aarau and Grasshopper were interested in transferring Grosicki, only to fail. He played in 38 matches and scored 4 goals throughout the season 2008–09, which his club finished in the eighth place.

=== Sivasspor and Rennes ===
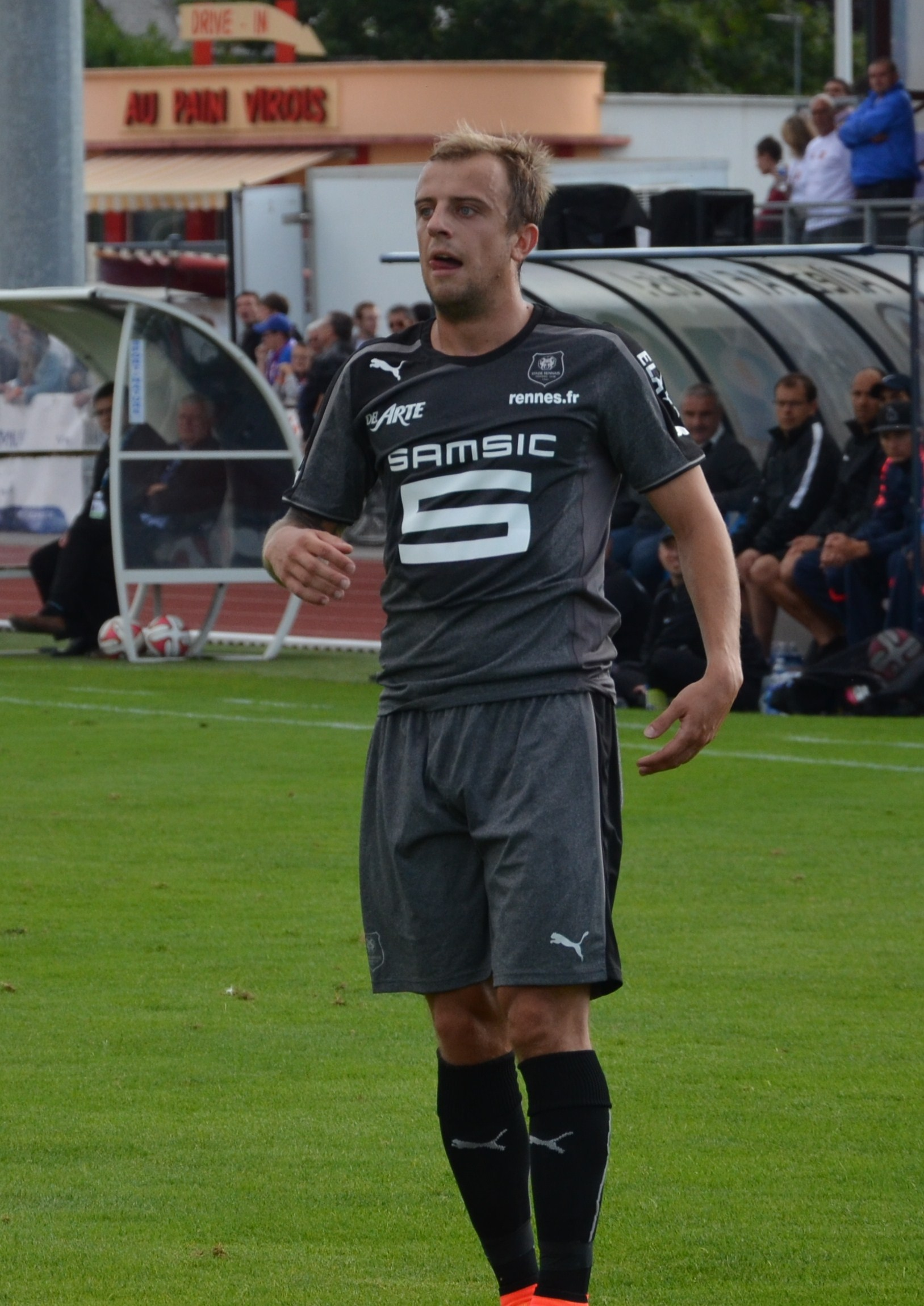
Grosicki playing for Rennes in 2014

Grosicki transferred to Süper Lig club Sivasspor in January 2011 for €900,000 on a three-and-a-half-year contract. On 24 January 2014, Grosicki transferred to French club Rennes of Ligue 1. He scored the first goal of their surprise 2–0 victory against Lille on 27 March, which put Rennes into the semi-finals of the Coupe de France. In the semi-final on 15 April, he scored again in a 3–2 victory against Angers. Grosicki played 52 minutes of the final before being substituted for Paul-Georges Ntep as Rennes went on to lose 2–0 to Guingamp. During his time with Rennes, Grosicki made 85 appearances and scored 13 goals.

=== Playing in England ===
On 31 January 2017, Grosicki signed a three-and-a-half-year contract with Premier League club Hull City. He debuted for the club in a 2–0 victory against Liverpool on 4 February 2017. Grosicki won PFA Fans' Premier League Player of the Month for April. He scored his first goal for the club on 12 August 2017, when he netted the second goal in a 4–1 home victory against Burton Albion.

On 31 January 2020, Grosicki signed an 18-month contract with West Bromwich Albion for an undisclosed fee. The fee was reported as in the region of £1 million, with add-ons based on promotion to the Premier League. On 5 July, he scored his first goal for the club in a 4–2 home victory against his former club, Hull City. On 27 May 2021, it was announced that Grosicki left West Bromwich Albion after his contract expired.

=== Return to Pogoń Szczecin ===
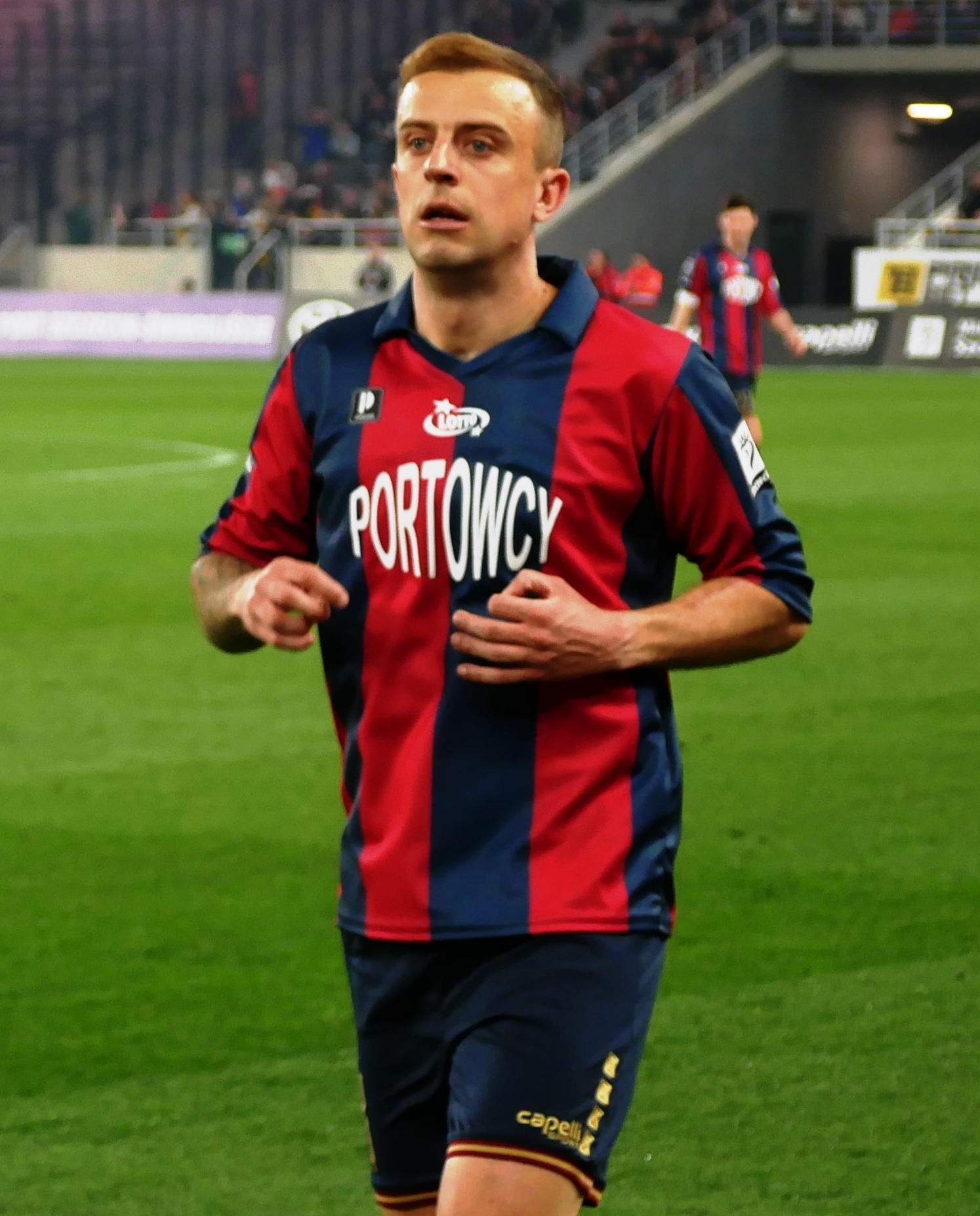
Grosicki lining up for Pogoń Szczecin (2023)

On 21 August 2021, Grosicki signed a two-year contract with the option of a one-year extension with Ekstraklasa club Pogoń Szczecin, returning to the club after fourteen years. On 28 August, he re-debuted in a match against Lech Poznań. On 23 October, he scored his first goal in a 4–1 victory against Jagiellonia Białystok.

In July 2023, Grosicki extended his contract with Pogoń until 30 June 2026, and was announced as the team's captain. In the 2024–25 season, he reached the Polish Cup final with Pogoń again, only to lose 3–4 against Legia Warsaw.

== International career ==
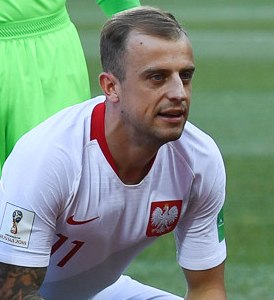
Grosicki lining up for Poland at the 2018 FIFA World Cup

Having represented the Poland national under-21 football team, Grosicki debuted for the senior team in a friendly match against Finland on 2 February 2008. He was selected in Poland for UEFA Euro 2012, only appearing on 16 June in the second group match in Wrocław, replacing Eugen Polanski for the final 34 minutes of a 1–0 defeat against the Czech Republic. On 7 September 2014, Grosicki scored his first two goals for Poland in a 7–0 away victory against Gibraltar at the start of UEFA Euro 2016 qualification. At Euro 2016, Grosicki was a key player for Poland whilst providing two assists in the competition for Jakub Błaszczykowski's goal against Switzerland in the Round of 16 and Robert Lewandowski's goal against Portugal in the quarter-finals.

After the match against England in March 2021, coach Paulo Sousa decided not to include Grosicki for UEFA Euro 2020. In March 2022, Grosicki returned to the national team when Czesław Michniewicz called him up for matches against Scotland (friendly match) and Sweden (World Cup play-off). He only played in the match against the first opponent. Later, Grosicki was called up for the 26-man UEFA Euro 2024 squad.

On 25 June 2024, Grosicki announced his retirement from international football following the Euro 2024 tournament. He played his farewell match on 6 June 2025 in 2–0 friendly victory against Moldova at the Silesian Stadium. He started the match as Poland's captain and was substituted in the 30th minute to a guard of honour. Six days later, Grosicki expressed interest in returning to the national team. In August 2025, he was included in the Poland squad for the 2026 FIFA World Cup qualifiers against the Netherlands and Finland. Later that year, on 17 November, he made his 100th international appearance in a 3–2 away victory against Malta during the same World Cup qualifiers. He made his final international appearance in a 3–2 defeat against Sweden in the World Cup qualifying play-off final on 31 March 2026. Two days later, Grosicki retired from international football for the second time, finishing his international career with 101 appearances.

== Personal life ==
Grosicki has two sisters, Kornelia, who is also a professional footballer, and Oliwia. He is married to Dominika.

== Career statistics ==
=== Club ===
As of match played 23 May 2026

Appearances and goals by club, season and competition
Club	Season	League			National cup (Note: Includes Polish Cup, Turkish Cup, Coupe de France, FA Cup)		League cup (Note: Includes Ekstraklasa Cup, Coupe de la Ligue, EFL Cup)		Europe		Other		Total	
Club	Season	Division	Apps	Goals	Apps	Goals	Apps	Goals	Apps	Goals	Apps	Goals	Apps	Goals
Pogoń Szczecin	2005–06	Ekstraklasa	2	0	—		—		—		—		2	0
Pogoń Szczecin	2006–07	Ekstraklasa	21	2	0	0	5	1	—		—		26	3
Pogoń Szczecin	Total		23	2	0	0	5	1	—		—		28	3
Legia Warsaw	2007–08	Ekstraklasa	11	1	2	0	—		—		1 (Note: Appearance in Polish Super Cup)	0	14	1
Sion (loan)	2007–08	Swiss Super League	8	2	—		—		—		—		8	2
Jagiellonia Białystok	2008–09	Ekstraklasa	13	4	—		—		—		—		13	4
Jagiellonia Białystok	2009–10	Ekstraklasa	30	4	7	1	—		—		—		37	5
Jagiellonia Białystok	2010–11	Ekstraklasa	15	6	2	0	—		2 (Note: Appearances in UEFA Europa League)	0	1	0	20	6
Jagiellonia Białystok	Total		58	14	9	1	—		2	0	1	0	70	15
Sivasspor	2010–11	Süper Lig	17	6	—		—		—		—		17	6
Sivasspor	2011–12	Süper Lig	40	7	2	0	—		—		—		42	7
Sivasspor	2012–13	Süper Lig	28	2	10	1	—		—		—		38	3
Sivasspor	2013–14	Süper Lig	5	0	2	1	—		—		—		7	1
Sivasspor	Total		90	15	14	2	—		—		—		104	17
Rennes	2013–14	Ligue 1	13	0	4	2	—		—		—		17	2
Rennes	2014–15	Ligue 1	19	0	1	0	1	0	—		—		21	0
Rennes	2015–16	Ligue 1	33	9	1	0	2	0	—		—		36	9
Rennes	2016–17	Ligue 1	16	4	1	0	1	0	—		—		18	4
Rennes	Total		81	13	7	2	4	0	—		—		92	15
Hull City	2016–17	Premier League	15	0	0	0	—		—		—		15	0
Hull City	2017–18	Championship	37	9	1	0	0	0	—		—		38	9
Hull City	2018–19	Championship	38	9	0	0	1	0	—		—		39	9
Hull City	2019–20	Championship	28	6	2	1	0	0	—		—		30	7
Hull City	Total		119	24	3	1	1	0	—		—		123	25
West Bromwich Albion	2019–20	Championship	14	1	0	0	0	0	—		—		14	1
West Bromwich Albion	2020–21	Premier League	3	0	1	0	1	0	—		—		5	0
West Bromwich Albion	Total		17	1	1	0	1	0	—		—		19	1
Pogoń Szczecin	2021–22	Ekstraklasa	26	9	1	0	—		—		—		27	9
Pogoń Szczecin	2022–23	Ekstraklasa	34	13	2	0	—		4 (Note: Appearances in UEFA Conference League)	0	—		40	13
Pogoń Szczecin	2023–24	Ekstraklasa	34	13	5	2	—		4	1	—		43	16
Pogoń Szczecin	2024–25	Ekstraklasa	33	7	6	3	—		—		—		39	10
Pogoń Szczecin	2025–26	Ekstraklasa	31	6	2	1	—		—		—		33	7
Pogoń Szczecin	Total		158	48	16	6	—		8	1	—		182	55
Career total			565	120	52	12	11	1	10	1	1	0	639	134

=== International ===
Appearances and goals by national team and year
National team	Year	Apps	Goals
Poland	2008	2	0
Poland	2009	1	0
Poland	2010	3	0
Poland	2011	4	0
Poland	2012	9	0
Poland	2013	3	0
Poland	2014	5	2
Poland	2015	8	4
Poland	2016	13	3
Poland	2017	7	2
Poland	2018	9	1
Poland	2019	9	1
Poland	2020	7	4
Poland	2021	3	0
Poland	2022	5	0
Poland	2023	5	0
Poland	2024	1	0
Poland	2025	6	0
Poland	2026	1	0
Total		101	17

Scores and results list Poland's goal tally first, score column indicates score after each Grosicki goal

List of international goals scored by Kamil Grosicki
No.	Date	Venue	Opponent	Score	Result	Competition
1	7 September 2014	Estádio do Algarve, Faro, Portugal	Gibraltar	1–0	7–0	UEFA Euro 2016 qualifying
2	7 September 2014	Estádio do Algarve, Faro, Portugal	Gibraltar	2–0	7–0	UEFA Euro 2016 qualifying
3	7 September 2015	National Stadium, Warsaw, Poland	Gibraltar	1–0	8–1	UEFA Euro 2016 qualifying
4	7 September 2015	National Stadium, Warsaw, Poland	Gibraltar	2–0	8–1	UEFA Euro 2016 qualifying
5	13 November 2015	National Stadium, Warsaw, Poland	Iceland	1–1	4–2	Friendly
6	17 November 2015	Stadion Miejski, Wrocław, Poland	Czech Republic	3–1	3–1	Friendly
7	26 March 2016	Stadion Miejski, Wrocław, Poland	Finland	1–0	5–0	Friendly
8	26 March 2016	Stadion Miejski, Wrocław, Poland	Finland	5–0	5–0	Friendly
9	11 November 2016	Arena Națională, Bucharest, Romania	Romania	1–0	3–0	2018 FIFA World Cup qualification
10	5 October 2017	Republican Stadium, Yerevan, Armenia	Armenia	1–0	6–1	2018 FIFA World Cup qualification
11	8 October 2017	Stadion Narodowy, Warsaw, Poland	Montenegro	2–0	4–2	2018 FIFA World Cup qualification
12	27 March 2018	Stadion Śląski, Chorzów, Poland	South Korea	2–0	3–2	Friendly
13	10 June 2019	Stadion Narodowy, Warsaw, Poland	Israel	3–0	4–0	UEFA Euro 2020 qualifying
14	7 September 2020	Bilino Polje, Zenica, Bosnia and Herzegovina	Bosnia and Herzegovina	2–1	2–1	2020–21 UEFA Nations League A
15	7 October 2020	Stadion Energa, Gdańsk, Poland	Finland	1–0	5–1	Friendly
16	7 October 2020	Stadion Energa, Gdańsk, Poland	Finland	2–0	5–1	Friendly
17	7 October 2020	Stadion Energa, Gdańsk, Poland	Finland	3–0	5–1	Friendly

== Honours ==
Individual

- PFA Fans' Premier League Player of the Month: April 2017
- Ekstraklasa Player of the Season: 2022–23, 2023–24
- Ekstraklasa Player of the Year: 2022, 2023
- Ekstraklasa Midfielder of the Season: 2023–24
- Ekstraklasa Player of the Month: September 2009, February 2024, February 2025, October 2025
- Polish Union of Footballers' Ekstraklasa Player of the Season: 2023–24
- Polish Union of Footballers' Ekstraklasa Team of the Season: 2023–24

== See also ==
- List of men's footballers with 100 or more international caps
