= Pedro Henrique (footballer, born 1990) =

Brazilian footballer

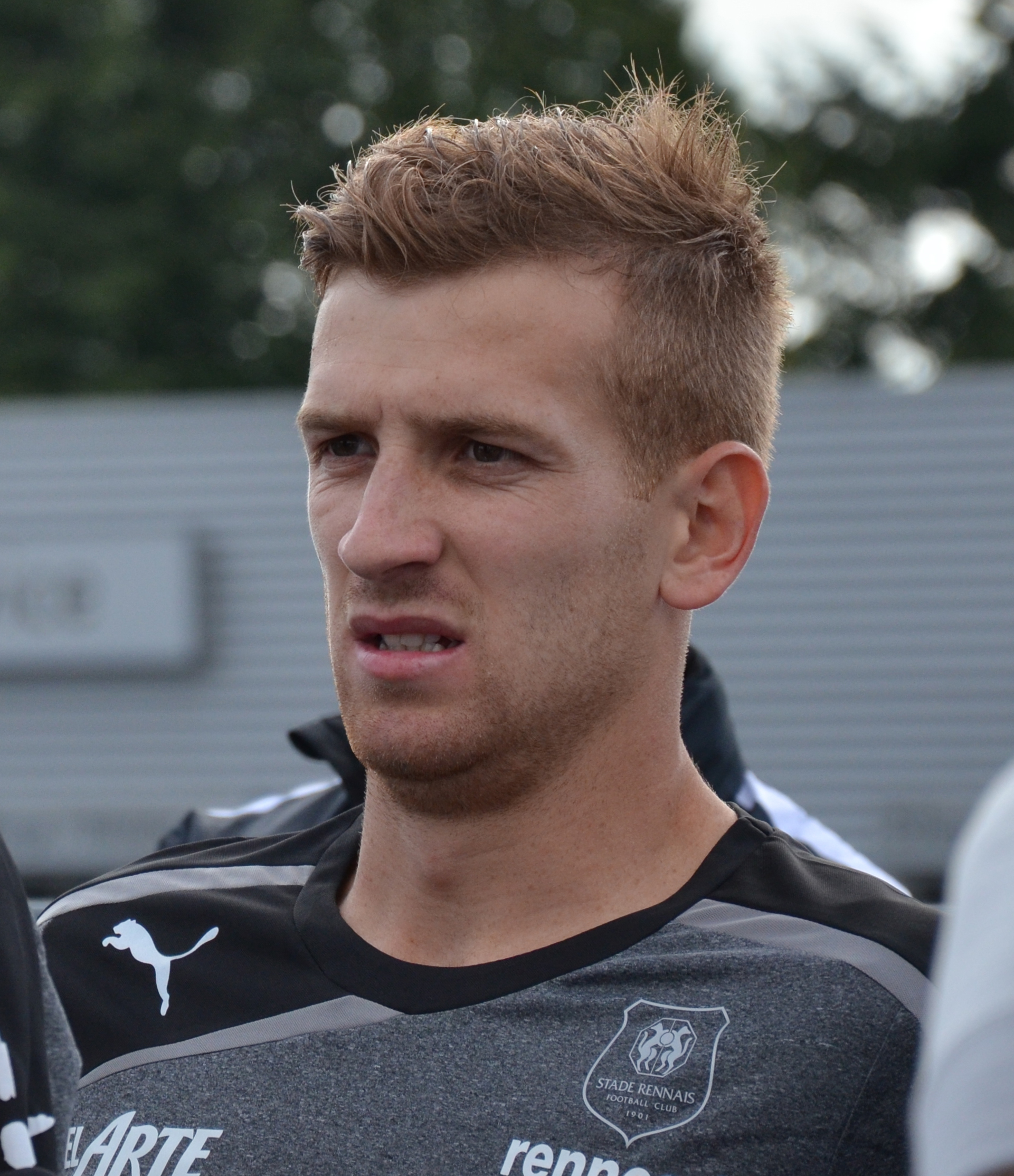
- Pedro Henrique with Rennes in 2014

Personal information
- Full name: Pedro Henrique Konzen Medina da Silva
- Date of birth: 16 June 1990 (age 36)
- Place of birth: Santa Cruz do Sul, Brazil
- Height: 1.81 m (5 ft 11 in)
- Position: Winger

Team information
- Current team: Fortaleza
- Number: 16

Youth career
- 2003–2007: Santa Cruz-RS
- 2008: Avaí
- 2008–2009: Grêmio

Senior career*
Years	Team	Apps	(Gls)
2010	Avenida	2	(0)
2010–2011	Caxias	20	(2)
2012–2014	FC Zürich	65	(11)
2014–2016	Rennes	69	(5)
2016–2019	PAOK	28	(8)
2017–2018	→ Qarabağ (loan)	19	(3)
2018	→ Astana (loan)	8	(0)
2019–2021	Kayserispor	59	(18)
2021–2022	Sivasspor	25	(8)
2022–2024	Internacional	74	(19)
2024	Corinthians	15	(1)
2025–2026	Ceará	41	(9)
2026–	Fortaleza	0	(0)
- * Club domestic league appearances and goals as of 15 April 2026

Pedro Henrique Konzen Medina da Silva (born 16 June 1990), commonly referred to as Pedro Henrique, is a Brazilian professional footballer who plays as a winger for Campeonato Brasileiro Série B club Fortaleza.

== Career ==
Born on 16 June 1990, in Santa Cruz do Sul, Pedro Henrique trained at Santa Cruz then Avaí and Grêmio .

In 2010, he left Grêmio to return to Santa Cruz do Sul, where he joined the ranks of Avenida. He made his debut in the Campeonato Gaúcho, playing two matches as a substitute. However, he is quickly recruited by the Caxias, with whom he discovers the C-series, obtains his first titles, and scores his first professional goals: during the 2011 season, he plays a total of 24 games and scores three goals. The first on 19 January 2011 against Esporte Clube Pelotas. Pedro Henrique played with the SER Caxias until January 2012. On that date, he left Brazil to join Europe. Spotted by FC Zürich, he signed a contract with the Swiss club on 24 January 2012. During his first half season in the Swiss championship, Pedro Henrique plays fifteen games. He scored his first and only goal of the season on 18 February 2012, against Thun. The following season, he was suffered from an injury, and therefore played only nineteen games.

In 2013–14, Pedro Henrique made his first full season in Zürich, playing forty games, including two from UEFA Europa League, in which FC Zürich was eliminated by Slovan Liberec, scoring eleven goals. He won the Coupe de Suisse, but he did not participate in the final, due to a suspension. This successful season allowed him to attract the attention of many clubs. On 26 June 2014 he signed with French Ligue 1 club Rennes, a four-year contract.

On 30 January 2017, Pedro Henrique moved to PAOK for a reported fee of €1.6 million, signing a contract with the Greek club until 30 June 2020. On 5 February 2017, in his second appearance in the Super League Greece he scored his first goal with the club, sealing a 3–2 home win against Asteras Tripolis. On 6 May 2017, he (81') along with Diego Biseswar bagged the goals of Serbian manager Vladan Ivic's team, helping PAOK win 2–1 at Greek Cup final against AEK Athens at Panthessaliko Stadium of Volos and won the Greek Cup title for the 5th time in the history of the club.

On 27 July 2017, Olimpik Donetsk and PAOK played out 1–1 draw at Valeriy Lobanovskyi Dynamo Stadium, for the third qualifying round of 2017–18 UEFA Europa League as the Greek Cup winners equalized thanks to a close-range effort by Pedro Henrique, who came from the bench five minutes earlier.

On 31 August 2017, Pedro Henrique signed for Qarabağ FK, on loan from Greek Cup winners PAOK until the end of 2017–18 season, with a buy out clause of €5 million. On 27 September 2017, Pedro Henrique scored in the first half, with Qarabağ's first UEFA Champions League goal, after an assist of Dino Ndlovu in a 2–1 home loss against Roma. On 24 May 2018, Qarabağ announced that Pedro Henrique had been released by the club following expiration of his loan deal.

On 14 July 2018, Pedro Henrique signed for Astana, on loan from Greek Cup winners PAOK until the end of 2018–19 season. On 30 August 2018, Pedro Henrique was the main protagonist and the only scorer with a penalty, in a 1–0 home win game against Cypriot club APOEL helping his club to qualify for UEFA Europa League group stage after a 2–1 aggregate win on penalties.

On 28 January 2019, PAOK confirmed the return of Brazilian forward from his loan spell at FC Astana. On 18 February 2019, he scored his first goal with the club after his return, a minute from full-time via a deflected shot from the edge of the penalty area, who had only been on the field for eight minutes after replacing Chuba Akpom, in a hammering 5–1 away win against Apollon Smyrnis in his rally to win the title after 34 years. On 7 April 2019, he opened the score in a 3–0 home win game against Lamia.

On 9 August 2019, Pedro Henrique signed a three-year contract with Turkish club Kayserispor for a €650,000 transfer fee.

== Career statistics ==
As of 24 November 2024

Appearances and goals by club, season and competition
Club	Season	League			State league (Note: Includes Campeonato Gaúcho, Campeonato Paulista)		National cup (Note: Includes Copa do Brasil, Swiss Cup, Coupe de France, Greek Football Cup, Azerbaijan Cup, Kazakhstan Cup, Turkish Cup)		League cup (Note: Includes Coupe de la Ligue)		Continental		Other		Total	
Club	Season	Division	Apps	Goals	Apps	Goals	Apps	Goals	Apps	Goals	Apps	Goals	Apps	Goals	Apps	Goals
Avenida	2010	Gaúcho	—		2	0	—		—		—		—		2	0
Caxias	2010	Série C	—		—		—		—		—		7 (Note: Appearances in Copa FGF)	2	7	2
Caxias	2011	Série C	3	1	17	1	4	1	—		—		7	2	31	5
Caxias	Total		3	1	17	1	4	1	—		—		14	4	38	7
Zürich	2011–12	Swiss Super League	15	1	—		0	0	—		0	0	—		15	1
Zürich	2012–13	Swiss Super League	17	1	—		0	0	—		—		—		17	1
Zürich	2013–14	Swiss Super League	33	9	—		5	2	–		2 (Note: Appearances in UEFA Europa League)	0	—		40	11
Zürich	Total		65	11	—		5	2	—		2	0	—		72	13
Rennes	2014–15	Ligue 1	34	2	—		3	1	3	0	—		—		40	3
Rennes	2015–16	Ligue 1	23	3	—		1	0	1	0	—		—		25	3
Rennes	2016-17	Ligue 1	12	0	—		1	0	2	2	—		—		15	2
Rennes	Total		69	5	—		5	1	6	2	—		—		80	8
PAOK	2016–17	Super League Greece	20	5	—		4	1	—		2	0	—		26	6
PAOK	2017–18	Super League Greece	1	0	—		0	0	—		4	1	—		5	1
PAOK	2018–19	Super League Greece	7	3	—		2	0	—		0	0	—		9	3
PAOK	Total		28	8	—		6	1	—		6	1	—		40	10
Qarabağ (loan)	2017–18	Azerbaijan Premier League	19	3	—		3	2	—		4 (Note: Appearances in UEFA Champions League)	1	—		26	6
FC Astana (loan)	2018	Kazakhstan Premier League	8	0	—		0	0	—		11 (Note: Four appearances in UEFA Champions League, seven appearances and three goals in UEFA Europa League)	3	—		19	3
Kayserispor	2019–20	Süper Lig	26	10	—		2	0	—		—		—		28	10
Kayserispor	2020–21	Süper Lig	33	8	—		0	0	—		—		—		33	8
Kayserispor	Total		59	18	—		2	0	—		—		—		61	18
Sivasspor	2021–22	Süper Lig	25	8	—		3	0	—		2 (Note: Appearances in UEFA Europa Conference League)	0	—		30	8
Internacional	2022	Série A	32	7	—		—		—		4 (Note: Appearances in Copa Sudamericana)	1	—		36	8
Internacional	2023	Série A	26	3	12	8	4	1	—		8 (Note: Appearances in Copa Libertadores)	0	—		50	12
Internacional	2024	Série A	0	0	4	1	0	0	—		—		—		4	1
Internacional	Total		58	10	16	9	4	1	—		12	1	—		90	21
Corinthians	2024	Série A	11	1	4	0	5	0	—		6	1	—		26	2
Career total			345	65	43	10	38	8	6	2	43	7	14	4	489	96

== Honours ==
Zürich

- Swiss Cup: 2013–14

PAOK

- Super League Greece: 2018–19
- Greek Cup: 2016–17, 2018–19

Qarabağ

- Azerbaijan Premier League: 2017–18

Astana FC

- Kazakhstan Premier League: 2018

Sivasspor

- Turkish Cup: 2021–22

Ceará

- Campeonato Cearense: 2025
