= Olivier Sorin =

French footballer (born 1981)

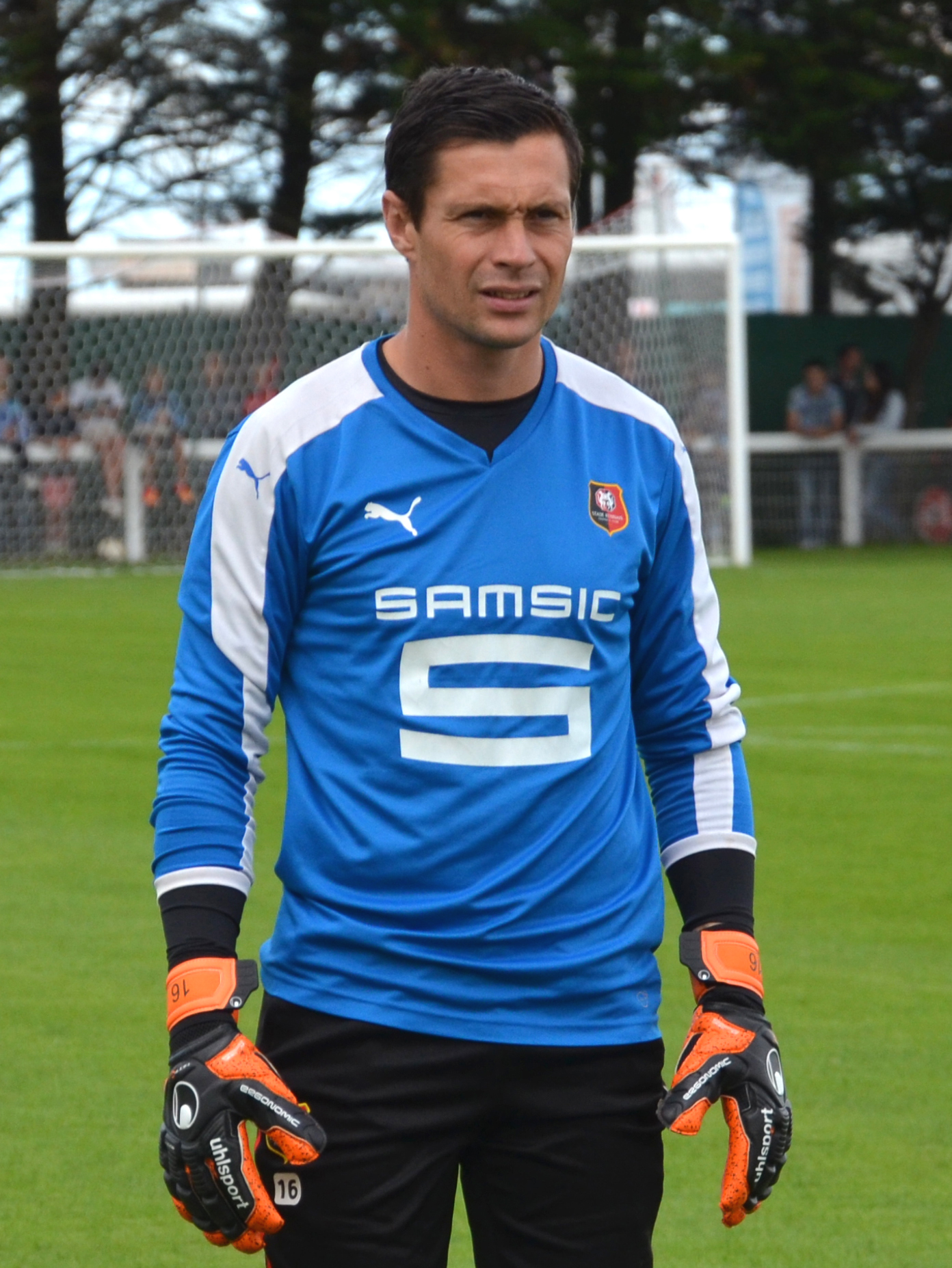
- Sorin training with Rennes in 2015

Personal information
- Date of birth: 16 April 1981 (age 45)
- Place of birth: Gien, France
- Height: 1.88 m (6 ft 2 in)
- Position: Goalkeeper

Youth career
- Orléans
- 1997–2001: Nancy

Senior career*
Years	Team	Apps	(Gls)
2000–2007	Nancy	70	(0)
2007–2014	Auxerre	205	(0)
2012	Auxerre B	1	(0)
2014–2016	Rennes	0	(0)
2014–2016	Rennes B	14	(0)
Total		290	(0)
- * Club domestic league appearances and goals

Olivier Sorin (born 16 April 1981) is a French former professional footballer who played as goalkeeper.

== Career ==
=== Nancy ===
Sorin started his professional career with Nancy and made 70 appearances. He stayed there for seven years.

=== Auxerre ===
Sorin signed a contract with Auxerre in 2007, and he played in the 2010–11 UEFA Champions League. He stayed there until the summer of 2014.

=== Rennes ===
In June 2014, Sorin signed a two-year contract with Rennes. He left the club in summer 2016 following the end of his contract.

== Career statistics ==
Appearances and goals by club, season and competition
Club	Season	League			National cup		League cup		Europe		Total	
Club	Season	Division	Apps	Goals	Apps	Goals	Apps	Goals	Apps	Goals	Apps	Goals
Nancy	1999–2000	Division 1	0	0	0	0	0	0	—		0	0
Nancy	2000–01	Division 2	1	0	0	0	0	0	—		1	0
Nancy	2001–02	Division 2	9	0	0	0	0	0	—		9	0
Nancy	2002–03	Ligue 2	24	0	4	0	3	0	—		31	0
Nancy	2003–04	Ligue 2	19	0	0	0	0	0	—		19	0
Nancy	2004–05	Ligue 2	1	0	3	0	1	0	—		5	0
Nancy	2005–06	Ligue 1	4	0	1	0	5	0	—		10	0
Nancy	2006–07	Ligue 1	12	0	—		2	0	4	0	18	0
Nancy	Total		70	0	8	0	11	0	4	0	93	0
Auxerre	2006–07	Ligue 1	20	0	1	0	—		—		21	0
Auxerre	2007–08	Ligue 1	19	0	0	0	3	0	—		22	0
Auxerre	2008–09	Ligue 1	18	0	1	0	2	0	—		21	0
Auxerre	2009–10	Ligue 1	35	0	1	0	0	0	—		36	0
Auxerre	2010–11	Ligue 1	38	0	1	0	0	0	8	0	47	0
Auxerre	2011–12	Ligue 1	36	0	0	0	2	0	—		38	0
Auxerre	2012–13	Ligue 2	24	0	1	0	2	0	—		27	0
Auxerre	2013–14	Ligue 2	15	0	0	0	0	0	—		15	0
Auxerre	Total		205	0	5	0	9	0	8	0	227	0
Nancy	2012–13	CFA	1	0	—		—		—		1	0
Rennes	2014–15	Ligue 1	0	0	0	0	0	0	—		0	0
Rennes	2015–16	Ligue 1	0	0	0	0	0	0	—		0	0
Rennes	Total		0	0	0	0	0	0	—		0	0
Rennes B	2014–15	CFA 2	6	0	—		—		—		6	0
Rennes B	2015–16	CFA 2	8	0	—		—		—		8	0
Rennes B	Total		14	0	—		—		—		14	0
Career total			290	0	13	0	20	0	12	0	335	0

== Honours ==
Nancy

- Coupe de la Ligue: 2005–06
