= Habib Habibou =

Central African footballer (born 1987)

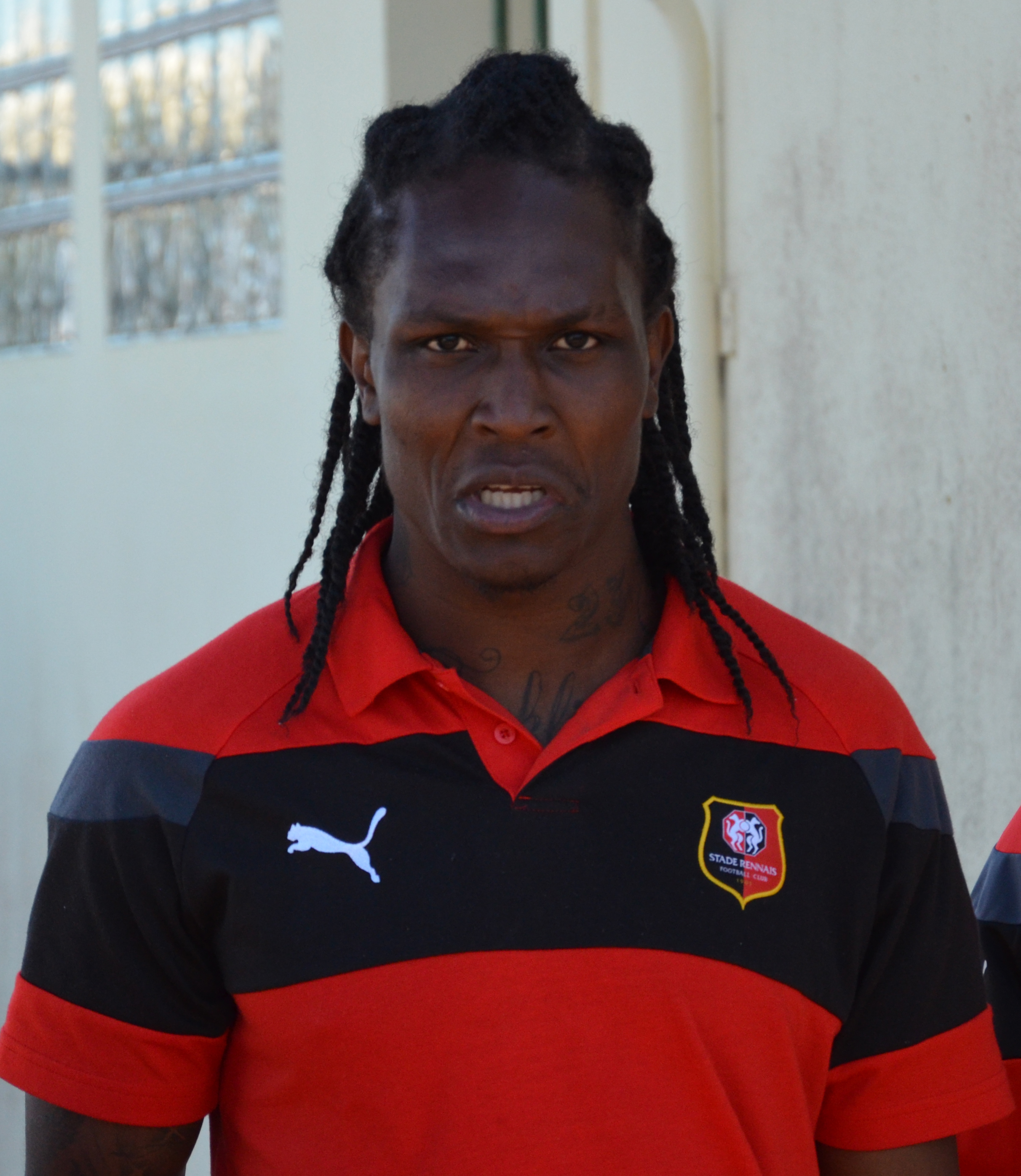
- Habibou while at Rennes in 2016

Personal information
- Full name: Mouhamadou Habib Habibou
- Date of birth: 16 April 1987 (age 39)
- Place of birth: Bria, Central African Republic
- Height: 1.92 m (6 ft 4 in)
- Position: Striker

Youth career
- Paris Saint-Germain

Senior career*
Years	Team	Apps	(Gls)
2005–2010	Charleroi	68	(16)
2007	→ Tubize (loan)	11	(12)
2008	→ Steaua București (loan)	8	(1)
2010–2013	Zulte Waregem	76	(29)
2013	→ Leeds United (loan)	4	(0)
2014	Gent	18	(12)
2014–2017	Rennes	27	(3)
2015–2016	Rennes B	4	(2)
2016	→ Gaziantepspor (loan)	9	(0)
2017	Lens	13	(7)
2017–2018	Qatar SC	9	(1)
2018–2019	Maccabi Petah Tikva	8	(1)
2019–2020	Lokeren	10	(1)
2020	Politehnica Iași	5	(0)

International career^{‡}
2016–2018	Central African Republic	2	(1)
- * Club domestic league appearances and goals as of 20:40, 24 August 2020 (UTC) ‡ National team caps and goals as of 21:30, 31 January 2017 (UTC)

Mouhamadou Habib Habibou (born 16 April 1987) is a Central African professional footballer who plays as a striker.

== Club career ==
=== Early career ===
Habibou started his career with Ligue 1 club Paris Saint Germain progressing through the youth setup. After failing to break into the first team he moved to Belgian club R. Charleroi S.C. During his spell at Charleroi he joined Tubize on loan in 2007 scoring 10 goals in just 13 appearances, his form led to him earning a loan move to Romanian side Steaua București in 2008.

=== Zulte Waregem ===
In 2010, Habibou joined fellow Belgian side S.V. Zulte Waregem from Charleroi. he was given the squad number 7 shirt. In 2011, Habibou joined English side Brighton & Hove Albion on trial, In December 2011 he also had a trial spell at West Ham United, however he stayed at Zulte Waregem.

After scoring six goals in 13 games in the first half of the 2012–13 season, Habibou interested Premier League side Queens Park Rangers and joined them on trial, also training with Leeds United. After QPR signed French international striker Loïc Rémy the move for Habibou was put on the backburner as he edged closer to a move. With Leeds striker Luciano Becchio handing in a transfer request, Habibou was lined up as a replacement for Becchio in the January window.

=== Leeds United ===
On 31 January 2013, transfer deadline day, Habibou completed his move to Leeds United on a six-month loan with the option to make the move permanent. Habibou made his debut as a second-half substitute in Leeds' 1–0 defeat against Cardiff City on 2 February. Habibou's only start came in Leeds' Yorkshire Derby against Huddersfield Town.

On 3 May, Leeds announced that they would not be making Habibou's loan deal permanent.

=== Later career ===
On 1 September 2014, transfer deadline day, Habibou joined Rennes on a three-year deal. After 26 appearances and 3 goals in his first season with Rennes, Habibou departed in January 2016 to join Süper Lig team Gaziantepspor on loan. He played nine times but failed to score for the Gaziantep-based club before returning to Rennes. A year later, in January 2017, Habibou joined Ligue 2 side Lens on a two-year contract.

== International career ==
Habibou was called up to the Central African Republic for 2013 Africa Cup of Nations qualifier against Burkina Faso on 14 October 2012. He made his debut in an AFCON qualifying 4–1 loss to DR Congo national football team on 4 September 2016.

== Career statistics ==
=== Club ===
As of 31 January 2017.

Club statistics
Club	Season	League			Cup (Note: Includes the Coupe de France.)		League Cup (Note: Includes the Coupe de la Ligue.)		Continental		Other		Total	
Club	Season	Division	Apps	Goals	Apps	Goals	Apps	Goals	Apps	Goals	Apps	Goals	Apps	Goals
Lens	2016–17	Ligue 2	5	4	0	0	—		—		0	0	0	0
Lens	Total		0	0	0	0	—		—		0	0	0	0
Career total			0	0	0	0	—		—		0	0	0	0

=== International ===
As of 18 November 2018.

National team	Year	Apps	Goals
Central African Republic
Central African Republic	2016	1	0
Central African Republic	2017	0	0
Central African Republic	2018	1	1
Total		2	1

=== International goals ===
Scores and results list Central African Republic's goal tally first.

No.	Date	Venue	Opponent	Score	Result	Competition
1.	18 November 2018	Stade Huye, Butare, Rwanda	Rwanda	1–1	2–2	2019 Africa Cup of Nations qualification

== Trivia ==
In 2010, during a Zulte Waregem game against Lokeren, Habibou grabbed and threw a duck over advertising hoardings because it had wandered onto the field.
