= Gelson Fernandes =

Swiss footballer (born 1986)

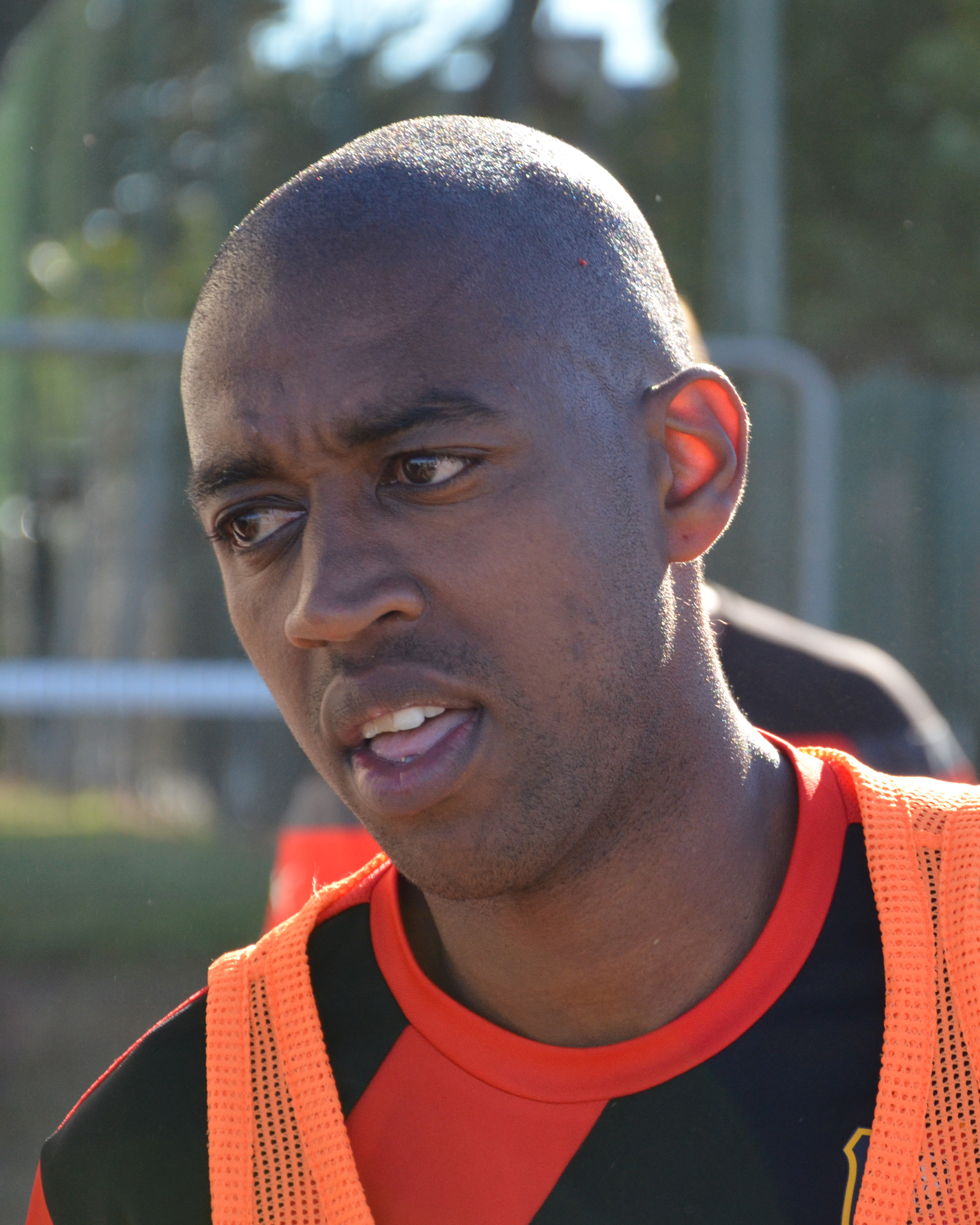
- Fernandes with Rennes in 2016

Personal information
- Full name: Gelson da Conceição Tavares Fernandes
- Date of birth: 2 September 1986 (age 40)
- Place of birth: Praia, Cape Verde
- Height: 1.80 m (5 ft 11 in)
- Position: Defensive midfielder

Youth career
- 1995–2004: Sion

Senior career*
Years	Team	Apps	(Gls)
2004–2007	Sion	56	(1)
2007–2009	Manchester City	43	(3)
2009–2012	Saint-Étienne	33	(0)
2010–2011	→ Chievo (loan)	29	(2)
2011–2012	→ Leicester City (loan)	15	(1)
2012	→ Udinese (loan)	16	(1)
2012–2013	Sporting CP	6	(0)
2013	→ Sion (loan)	14	(0)
2013–2014	SC Freiburg	30	(1)
2014–2017	Rennes	93	(1)
2017–2020	Eintracht Frankfurt	58	(1)
Total		393	(11)

International career
2005–2007	Switzerland U21	9	(0)
2007–2018	Switzerland	67	(2)
- * Club domestic league appearances and goals

Gelson da Conceição Tavares Fernandes (born 2 September 1986) is a former professional footballer who played as a defensive midfielder. Born in Cape Verde, he represented the Switzerland national team. He is most well known for scoring the winner for Switzerland against eventual champions Spain in a group game at the 2010 World Cup.

Fernandes' professional football career spans 16 years across clubs in Switzerland, England, France, Italy, Portugal and Germany.

== Club career ==
=== FC Sion ===
Fernandes started his football career at FC Sion when he first joined the club at age seven years old. Fernandes was promoted to the first team in 2004 after being called by manager Gilbert Gress. Having previously made a total of five appearances in the 2004–05 season, the 2005–06 season proved to be the breakout year for the player as he got more playing time for Sion, playing in the central midfielder position for the side. Fernandes also led his team win the Swiss Cup in a penalty shootout (5–3) against Young Boys. In his first full season at the club, he went on to make 22 league appearances and scoring none.

In the 2006–07 season, Fernandes continued to remain in the first team for Sion, playing in the midfield position. He then scored his first goals of the season, in a 3–1 win against FC Naters in the first round of the Swiss Cup. Fernandes then made his European debut for Sion in a 0–0 draw against Bayer Leverkusen, in a 0–0 draw in the first round of the UEFA Cup first leg. In the return leg, he scored his first European Cup goal against Leverkusen which Sion lost 3–1 on aggregate. On 14 October 2006, Fernandes scored his first league goal for Sion in a 1–1 draw against Luzern. On the final league game of the 2006–07 season, he received a second bookable offense in the 90th minute after receiving a yellow card in a first half, which turned out to be his last appearance for Sion as Sion won 3–0 against St. Gallen. At the end of the 2006–07 season, Fernandes went on to make forty–one appearances (35 in the league) and scoring four times in all competitions.

=== Manchester City ===
Fernandes signed for Manchester City from Sion on 14 July 2007 for an undisclosed fee, believed to be around €6 million (£4.2 million), which would make his sale the second highest transfer in the history of the Swiss League. Following his signing, Sven-Göran Eriksson commented that he thought Fernandes was the "best young player in Switzerland." Upon joining the club, he was given a number twenty–eight shirt.

Fernandes made his Manchester City debut, starting the whole game, in a 2–1 win against Bristol City in the second round of the League Cup. Two months later on 20 October 2007, he made his league debut after coming on for Elano in the 89th minute in a 1–0 victory over Birmingham City. By November, Fernandes soon established himself in the starting eleven, playing in the midfield position. He scored his first goal in a 2–0 victory against Newcastle United on 2 January 2008, after coming on as a substitute for Stephen Ireland and it took just 40 seconds for Fernandes and Kelvin Etuhu to combine for the former to finish from the edge of the box. On 2 February 2008, he scored his second goal in the 1–3 loss to Arsenal at the City of Manchester Stadium when Vedran Ćorluka took advantage of a Gaël Clichy defensive error, who slipped in a pass into the six-yard box for Fernandes to tuck home. The goal was not enough to secure any points for Manchester City, but showed the City fans that Fernandes was also capable of having an eye for goal like fellow youth midfielder, Michael Johnson. At the end of the 2007–08 season, he went on to make thirty–two appearances and scoring two times in all competitions.

At the start of the 2008–09 season, Fernandes switched number shirt from number 28 to number 19 after his previous number was taken by Daniel Sturridge. He then scored his first goal of the season against Portsmouth on 21 September 2008, as Manchester City won 6–0. Three days later on 24 September 2008, Fernandes scored his second goal of the season against Brighton & Hove Albion in the second round of the League Cup, as the club lost 5–3 on penalties following a 2–2 draw throughout the 120 minutes match. He found his playing time, mostly coming from the substitute bench after Mark Hughes took over as manager. As the 2008–09 season progressed, Fernandes found himself away from the first team further, due to being on the substitute bench and his own injury concern. At the end of the 2008–09 season, he went on to make twenty–seven appearances and scoring two times in all competitions.

Following this, it was expected that Fernandes would be leaving Manchester City, as clubs from Europe were interested in signing him.

=== Saint-Étienne ===
On 9 July 2009, Fernandes passed a medical to complete a £2 million move to Ligue 1 side Saint-Étienne and the move was confirmed the next day, signing a two-year contract for an undisclosed fee.

He made his league debut in the opening game of the season against Nice, starting a match and played 64 minutes before being substituted, in a 0–2 loss. Since joining the club, Fernandes quickly established himself playing in the defensive midfield position. At one point, he played in the right–back position, coming against Sochaux on 5 December 2009. His time at Saint Etienne had a difficult start and Fernandes moved little-by-little in the middle with some fighting and a good state of mind without being convincing. Despite this, he later helped the club avoid relegation and finished seventeenth place in the league. At the end of the 2009–10 season, Fernandes went on to make thirty–eight appearances in all competitions for Saint-Étienne in his first season.

=== Loan spells ===
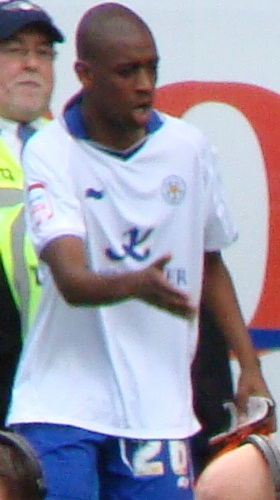
Fernandes playing for Leicester City in 2011

After fallen out of favour by Manager Christophe Galtier and was told that he can leave Saint-Étienne on loan, it was announced on 30 August 2010, it was announced that Fernandes would be going out on loan with an option to purchase to Chievo. He made his debut for the club, coming on as a 59th-minute substitute, in a 3–1 win over Genoa on 12 September 2010. Since joining Chievo, Fernandes became involved in a number of matches in the first team for the club. He scored his first goal for the club, in a 3–1 win over Napoli on 22 September 2010. On 31 October 2010, Fernandes received a red card after a second bookable offense against Parma. On 20 February 2011, he scored his second goal for Chievo, in a 2–1 loss against A.C. Milan. Despite facing suspensions on five occasions throughout the 2010–11 season, Fernandes went on to make thirty appearances and scoring two goals for Chievo in all competitions. Following this, the club decided against signing him on a permanent basis.

On 4 August 2011, Fernandes signed for Championship club Leicester City on a season long loan, subject to international clearance, and he was joined by Sven-Göran Eriksson who signed him at Manchester City. Following his return move to England on loan, Fernandes revealed he was told that his move will become permanent, but only if the club gain promotion to the Premier League. Fernandes made his debut for Leicester City in a 1–0 away win over Coventry City on 6 August 2011. Two weeks later on 20 August 2011, he scored his first goal for the club, as well as, setting up Leicester City's first goal of the game, in a 2–2 draw against Nottingham Forest on 20 August. Since making his debut for the club, Fernandes became a first team regular for the side, playing in the midfield position. This lasted until his Eriksson's sacking due to poor results, and was replaced by Nigel Pearson, who didn't play Fernandes until on 3 December 2011 and made his last appearance for Leicester City in a 2–1 loss against Hull City. On 30 December 2011, he asked for his loan contract at the club to be terminated and to return to France. Six days later on 4 January, it was announced that Fernandes's loan deal with Leicester City had been cancelled by mutual consent. By the time he left the club, Fernandes made eighteen appearances and scoring once in all competitions for Leicester City.

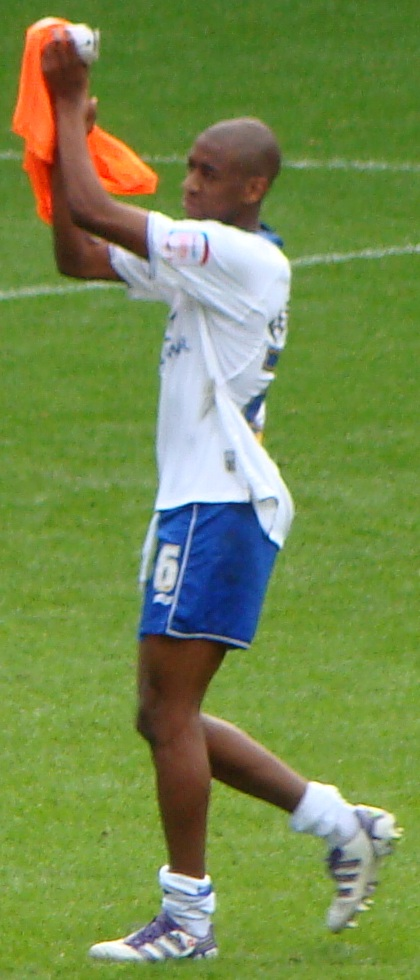
Fernandes with Leicester City in 2011

After his loan deal at Leicester City ended, Fernandes was then sent out for another loan deal, but this time he signed for current Serie A frontrunners Udinese until the end of the season to strengthen the squad after some of the players went to play at the African Cup of Nations. So Udinese wanted a player who could acclimatise quickly. On 22 January 2012, Fernandes made his debut for the club in a 2–1 win over Catania in the Coppa Italia. Since making his debut for Udinese, he became a first team regular, starting in the next ten matches, playing in the midfield position. This lasted until Fernandes was dropped to the substitute bench for the next four matches. On 11 April 2012, he returned to the starting line–up and scored his first goal, on his return, in a 3–1 loss against Roma. At the end of the 2011–12 season, Fernandes made seventeen appearances and scoring once in all competitions. Following this, he returned to his parent club after the club decided against signing him permanently.

=== Sporting Clube de Portugal ===
Ahead of the 2012–13 season, Fernandes once again not featured for the Saint-Étienne's pre-season training, putting his future at the club in doubt. It was announced on 4 July 2012 he signed a four-year contract with Sporting Clube de Portugal, with a €25 million buy-out clause.

Fernandes made his debut for the club, starting the whole game, in a 0–0 draw against Vitória de Guimarães in the opening game of the season. He then helped Sporting Lisbon beat AC Horsens in the second round of the UEFA Europa League Play–Off Round, in a 5–0 win. However, his first team opportunities was limited, having been placed on the substitute bench and was restricted to twelve appearances in all competitions for the club. After his loan spell at Sion ended, Fernandes was among with many players to be sold.

==== FC Sion (loan) ====
On 21 December 2012, it was confirmed that he returned to Sion, signing a loan until the end of the 2012–13 season with an option to sign him at the end of the loan.

Fernandes made his debut for the club, starting the match and played 81 minutes before being substituted, in a 3–0 win against SC Kriens on 3 February 2013. Since joining FC Sion, he quickly became the club's first team regular for the rest of the season. However, towards the end of the season, Fernandes faced restrictions, as he faced suspension on two occasions and suffered an injury that will keep him out for the remainder of the 2012–13 season. At the end of the 2012–13 season, Fernandes made sixteen appearances in all competitions. Following this, his options to join FC Sion permanently has ended after the club have to pay the price to sign Fernandes.

=== SC Freiburg ===
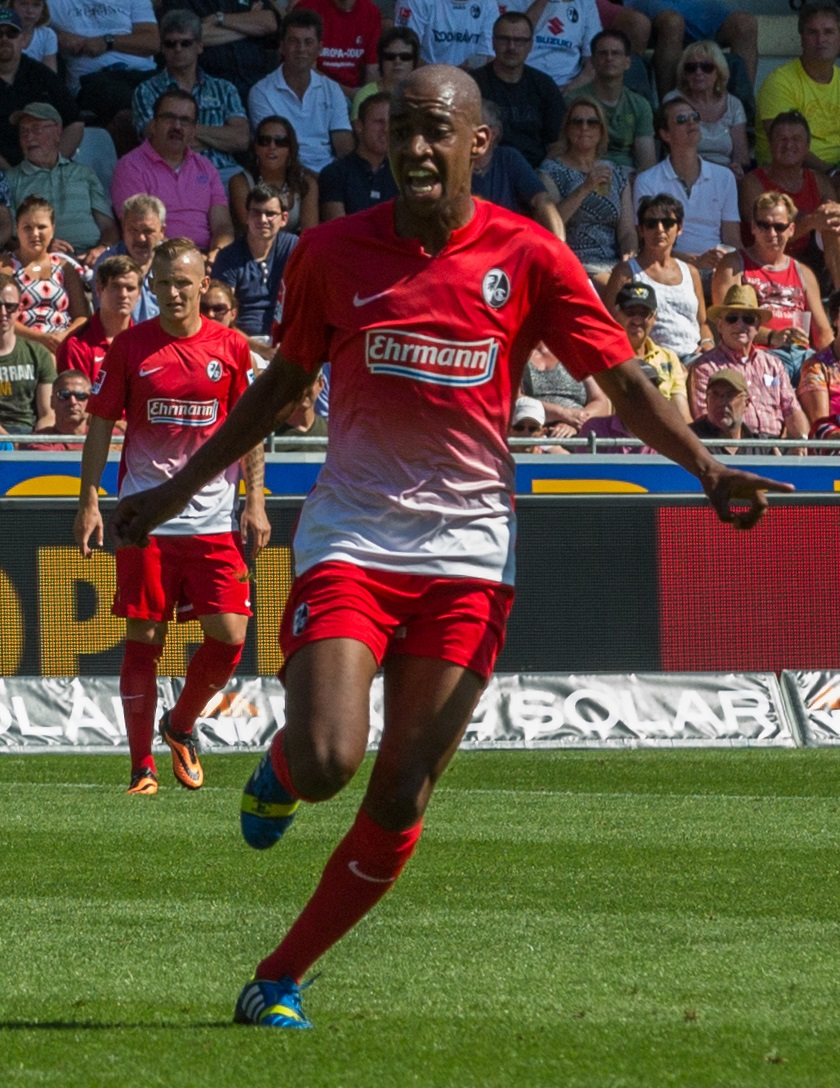
Fernandes playing for SC Freiburg in 2013

It was announced on 27 June 2013 that Fernandes signed with Bundesliga side SC Freiburg on long-term contract, with a fee of €400,000.

He made his league debut in the opening game of the season, as SC Freiburg lost 3–1 against Bayer Leverkusen. This was followed up by setting up the club's only goal of the game, losing 2–1 against Mainz 05. Since joining SC Freiburg, Fernandes became a first team regular, playing as a defensive midfielder. His first goal came on 23 November 2013, in a 1–0 victory over Eintracht Braunschweig. After the match, he said: "I am totally happy for the young team. These were three very important points, but we have only eleven, that's not much." As the season progressed, Fernandes continued to remain in the starting eleven despite being placed on the substitute bench on five occasions. At the end of the 2013–14 season, he went on to make thirty–eight appearances and scoring once in all competitions. Following this, it was announced that Fernandes would leave Freiburg despite still having contract until 2016 ahead of the 2014–15 season.

=== Stade Rennais ===
It was announced on 4 August 2014 that Fernandes signed a four-year contract until 2018 with French Stade Rennais, as Freiburg received a transfer fee believed to be €1.6 million, which still can be increased by additional performance-related payments. Upon joining the club, he was given a number six shirt.

Fernandes made his Stade Rennais debut in the opening game of the season against Lyon, coming on as a 63rd-minute substitute, in a 2–0 loss. Since joining the club, he quickly established himself in the first team, playing in the defensive midfield position. This lasted until Fernandes suffered a hamstring injury that saw him sidelined for a month. On 10 January 2015, he returned to the first team, starting the whole game, in a 1–1 draw against Evian. Following this, Fernandes continued to regain his first team place for the rest of the 2014–15 season. In his first season at Stade Rennais, he went on to make thirty–six appearances in all competitions.

At the start of the 2015–16 season, Fernandes started in the next first four league matches of the season. This lasted until he was suspended for picking up five yellow cards, having picked up three bookings in the last three matches. After serving a one match suspension, Fernandes returned to the starting line–up against Lille on 19 September 2015, as Stade Rennais drew 2–2. However, his return was short–lived in a follow–up match against Gazélec Ajaccio when he suffered a muscle injury and was substituted in the 22nd minute, as the club drew 1–1. After the match, it was announced that Fernandes was sidelined between three and four weeks. On 18 October 2015, he returned to the starting line–up against Nice, as Stade Rennais lost 4–1. Fernandes then captained the club for the first time in his career against FC Lorient on 24 October 2015 and helped the side draw 1–1. Two weeks later on 6 November 2015, he scored his first goal for Stade Rennais, in a 2–0 win against Angers SCO. Fernandes then made his 50th appearance for the club, starting the whole game, in a 1–0 loss against Marseille on 3 December 2015. Since returning from injury, Fernandes continued to establish himself in the starting eleven, playing in the midfield position. Despite missing two more matches later in the 2015–16 season, due to suspension, Fernandes went on to make thirty–seven appearances and scoring once in all competitions.

At the start of the 2016–17 season, Fernandes appeared in the first eight league matches of the season, including captaining two matches. This lasted until he was sidelined two occasions for Stade Rennais, due to suspension and then suffered an injury. Following this, Fernandes continued to remain involved in the first team for the club despite finding himself placed on the substitute bench towards the end of the 2016–17 season. Despite this, Fernandes was able to make his 100th appearance for Stade Rennais, coming against SM Caen on 14 May 2017, in a 1–0 win. At the end of the 2016–17 season, he went on to make twenty–eight appearances in all competitions.

=== Eintracht Frankfurt ===
On 2 June 2017, Fernandes joined Bundesliga side Eintracht Frankfurt on a two-year deal.

Fernandes made his debut for the club, starting the whole game, in a 3–0 win against TuS Erndtebrück in the first round of the DFB–Pokal. He then appeared in the first two months for the Eintracht Frankfurt, playing in the midfield position. However, Fernandes tore his hamstring during a match against RB Leipzig on 23 September 2017 and was substituted in the 27th minute, as the club lost 2–1. Following this, it was announced he would be out for several weeks with a hamstring injury and didn't play for two months. On 15 November 2017, Fernandes returned to the first team, coming on as a 75th-minute substitute, in a 1–1 draw against TSG 1899 Hoffenheim. Since returning to the first team from injury, he, however, found himself in and out of the starting line–up for Eintracht Frankfurt. In the semi–finals of the DFB–Pokal against Schalke 04, Fernandes was sent–off for a straight red card, having come on as a substitute three minutes before, as the club won 1–0 to advance to the next round. He watched from the sidelines, as Eintracht Frankfurt won 3–1 against Bayern Munich to advance to the next round. At the end of the 2017–18 season, Fernandes went on to make twenty–two appearances in all competitions.

In the opening game of the 2018–19 season against SC Freiburg, Fernandes was given the captaincy for the time in his Eintracht Frankfurt's career in the absence of David Abraham, as the club drew 1–1. On 23 September 2018, he scored his first goal for the club, in a 1–1 draw against RB Leipzig. Fernandes was involved in the first team for the first two months to the season until he suffered a knock that saw him miss one match. Following his return from injury, he continued to remain in the first team regular, playing in the midfield position. As a result, Fernandes signed a one–year contract extension with Eintracht Frankfurt, keeping him until 2020. In continuous absent of Abraham due to injury, Fernandes resumed as the captain of Eintracht Frankfurt between December and April. However, he later missed five matches in the second half of the season, including a second bookable offence, in a 3–1 loss against FC Augsburg on 14 April 2019. At the end of the 2018–19 season, Fernandes went on to make thirty–seven appearances and scoring once in all competitions.

In the 2019–20 season, Fernandes played in both legs of the UEFA Europa League play–off round against RC Strasbourg, as he helped Eintracht Frankfurt win 3–1 on aggregate to send them through to the Group Stage. However, he found his first team place limited following an increase in the midfield position and was placed on the substitute bench as a result. By mid–September, Fernandes received seven starts for the club by the end of the year despite facing sidelined with suspension and injury. In the second half of the season, he was plagued by injuries that saw him sidelined for months. The five-months interruption because of the COVID-19 pandemic gave him time to recover, and returned to training. It was announced 14 May 2020 that Fernandes would retire at the end of the season, bringing an end to a 15-year career. On 23 May 2020, he made his first appearances for the Eintracht Frankfurt since December, captaining the club, as they lost 5–2 against Bayern Munich. Fernandes previously captained Eintracht Frankfurt earlier in the 2019–20 season, coming against Vitória de Guimarães on 3 October 2019. However, he suffered a calf injury that saw him sidelined for the rest of the season. Following this, Fernandes went on to make twenty–two appearances in all competitions. Two months after his retirement, he had an interview with Berner Zeitung and spoke about his retirement.

== International career ==
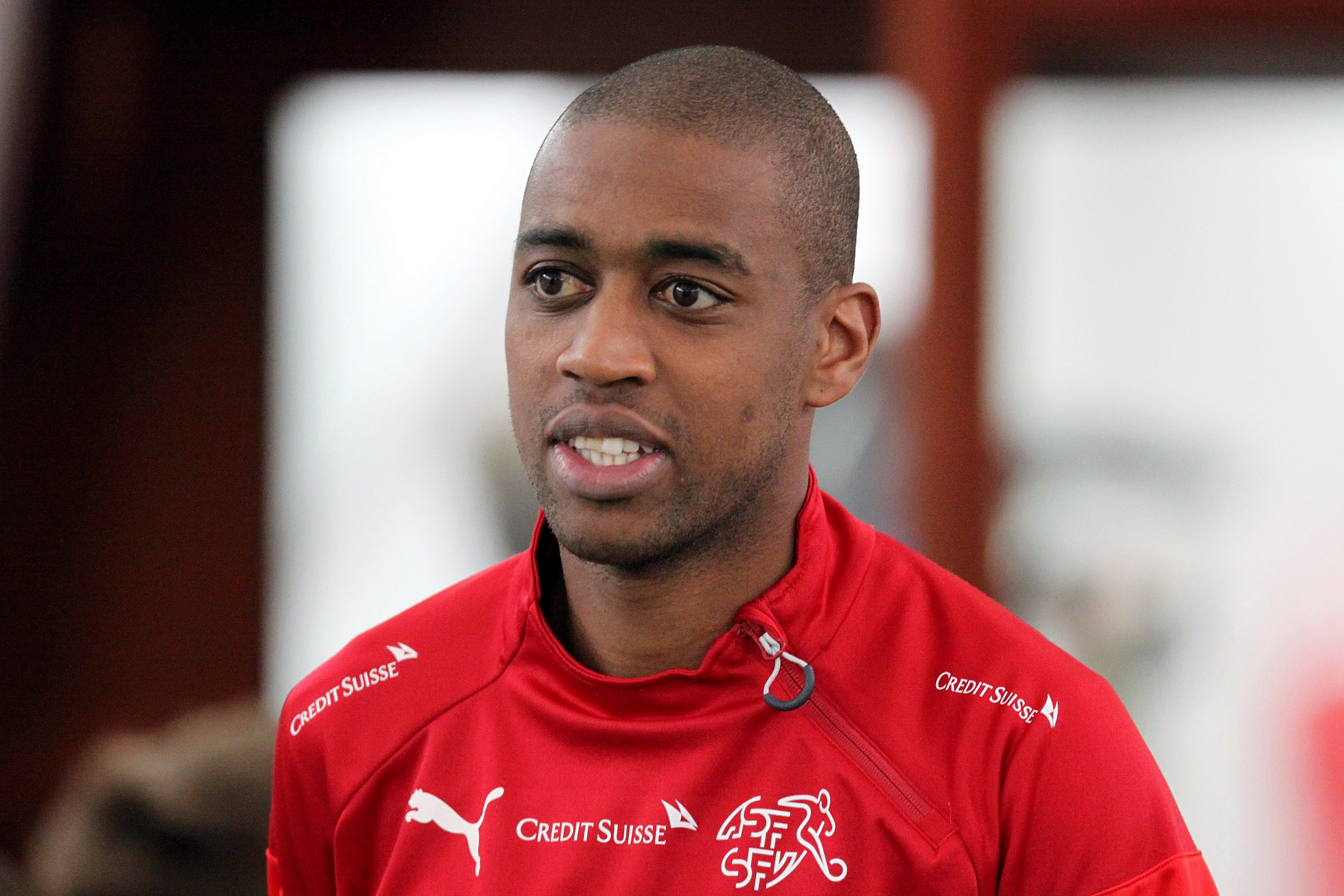
Fernandes with Switzerland in 2015

Fernandes was eligible to play for Switzerland and Cape Verde. His progress attracted interests from the Switzerland Youth Team, playing from the U16 to U21 sides. On 26 April 2006, he made his Switzerland U21 debut, in a 3–3 draw against Romania U21. Fernandes was captain of the Switzerland U-21 that played against the England U21 side in their Euro 2007 qualifying match, becoming the first player with African roots to do so. He went on to make nine appearances for the U21 side.

He made his first full international appearance for Switzerland against the Netherlands on 22 August 2007. Fernandes was named in the Swiss squad for their co-hosting of UEFA Euro 2008. He played in all three of the national side's fixtures in the tournament, as Switzerland were eliminated in the Group Stage.

Following the end of the tournament, Fernandes continued to be involved in both friendly and World Cup Qualification matches for the national side. On 28 March 2009, Fernandes scored his first goal for Switzerland, heading in a corner to seal a 2–0 win against Moldova. He then helped Switzerland qualify for the FIFA World Cup after beating Israel on 14 October 2009. In May 2010, Fernandes was called up to the national team squad for the World Cup in South Africa. He scored his first 2010 World Cup goal for Switzerland against eventual winners Spain on 16 June 2010, which Switzerland went on to win 1–0. After this, he was considered as a national hero in Switzerland. However, Switzerland did not advance to the round of 16, after a loss to Chile and a draw to Honduras.

The next four years saw manager Ottmar Hitzfeld continue to select Fernandes for the national team squad but he was barred in the midfield by Valon Behrami, Granit Xhaka and Blerim Džemaili. Fernandes played 22 minutes and helped Switzerland qualify for the World Cup after winning 2–1 against Albania on 11 October 2013. Manager Vladimir Petković named him in the 23-man squad for the 2014 FIFA World Cup, having made it on two occasions. His only appearance in the tournament came on 1 July 2014 against Argentina in the Round of 16, playing 54 minutes, as the national side lost 1–0.

Following the end of the tournament, Fernandes spent the two years on the substitute bench under the new management of Vladimir Petković. During which, he made his 50th appearance for Switzerland, coming against Poland on 18 November 2014, as the national side drew 2–2. In May 2016, Manager Petković chose Fernandes in the 23-man squad for the finals in France ahead of the UEFA Euro 2016 tournament. In two of the three group games, he came on from the substitute bench in the remaining ten minutes of the match. In the Round of 16 against Poland, Fernandes came on as a substitute and played the whole match, leading up to the penalty shoot-out, which, as the national side lost on penalties.

Following the end of the UEFA Euro 2016 tournament, he was featured in five matches for the next two years. Despite missing out in play-offs, Switzerland went on to qualify for the World Cup after beating Northern Ireland 1–0 on aggregate. Fernandes was included in the Switzerland national football team 23 man squad for the 2018 FIFA World Cup in Russia. However, he was featured as an unused substitute, as the national side was eliminated from the tournament, losing 1–0 against Sweden in the last 16. Following this, Fernandes announced his retirement from international football.

== Post-playing career ==
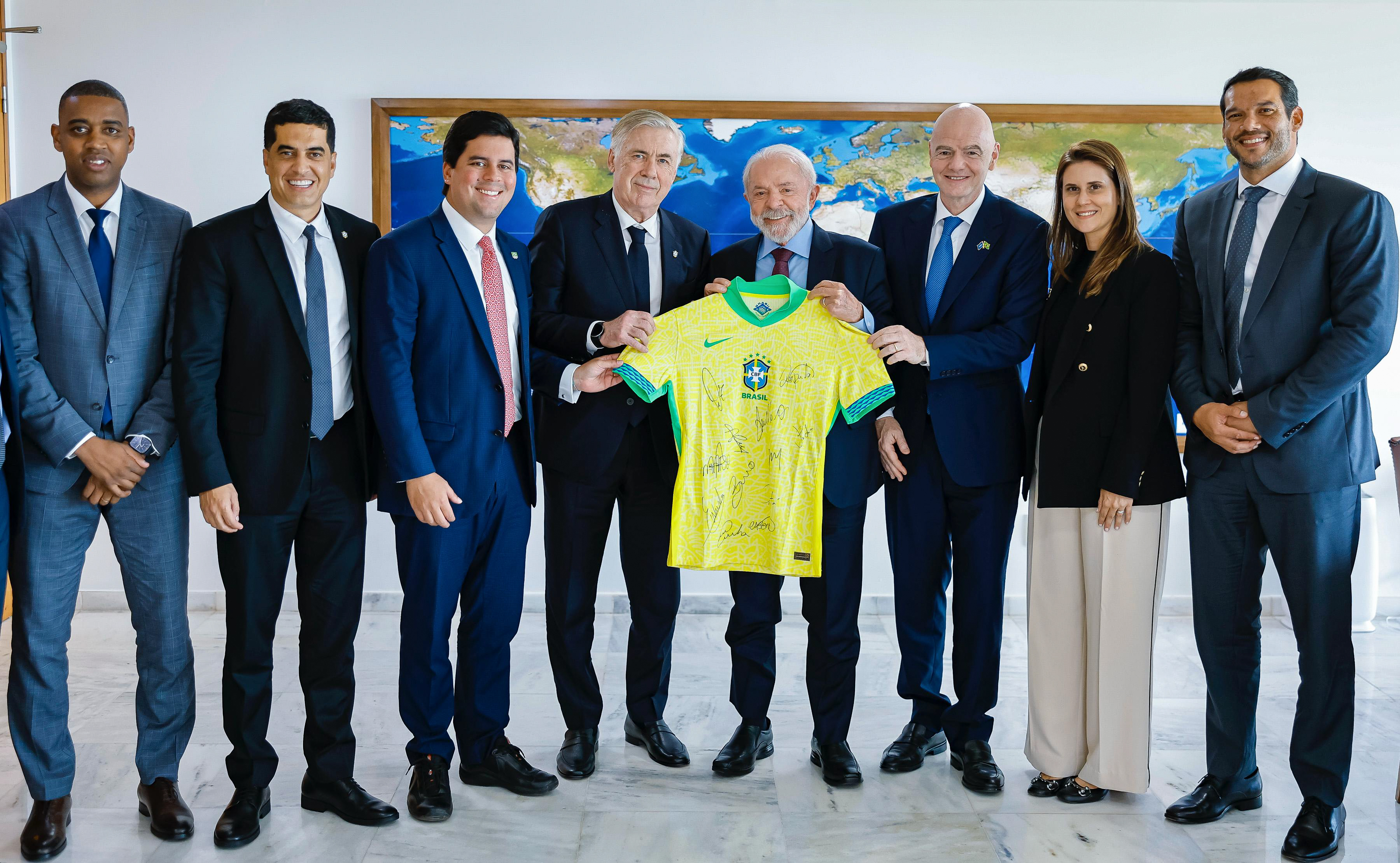
Fernandes (first left) in 2026.

After retiring Fernandes went into football administration. From July 2021 to July 2022, he served as the Vice-president of his former club FC Sion.

In April 2022, FIFA announced the appointment of Fernandes as Director Member Associations Africa effective 1 August 2022. In his role as director, his responsibility is to oversee the services to strengthen the growth and development of the African member associations through the FIFA Forward Programme. In March 2023, in his capacity as Director, he took a two-day working visit to Ghana, where he engaged the Ghana Football Association and its stakeholders including the Ministry of Youth and Sports and the Parliament of Ghana Select Committee on Youth, Sports and Culture.

== Personal life ==
Fernandes arrived in Switzerland with his mother at the age of five from the Cape Verde islands, the family settling in Sion, as his father, Jose, works for FC Sion as a groundskeeper. Regarding on his nationality, he said: "That is important to me. Look at me, you know immediately where I come from. This is my culture, this is where my roots are. By the way, there is not a single day that I am not on the other side of the ocean for a few moments travel. A little Zouc or Funana, and I'll take off. In moments like this, nothing can disturb me."

Fernandes natively speaks Portuguese, the official language of his birthplace, Cape Verde. In addition to speaking Portuguese, Fernandes also speaks Creole, French, German, Italian, Spanish and English. He began learning Mandarin Chinese in 2017, stating it's “for fun”. Fernandes also the cousin of the footballers Manuel Fernandes, Adilson Cabral, Edimilson Fernandes, Elton Monteiro and Ulisses Garcia.

Fernandes is married to his wife, Tiffany, and they have a daughter, Sienna. He has another daughter in a previous relationship.

== Career statistics ==
Appearances and goals by national team and year
National team	Year	Apps	Goals
Switzerland	2007	4	0
Switzerland	2008	11	0
Switzerland	2009	6	1
Switzerland	2010	10	1
Switzerland	2011	6	0
Switzerland	2012	4	0
Switzerland	2013	5	0
Switzerland	2014	4	0
Switzerland	2015	3	0
Switzerland	2016	9	0
Switzerland	2017	2	0
Switzerland	2018	3	0
Total		67	2

Scores and results list Switzerland's goal tally first, score column indicates score after each Fernandes goal.

List of international goals scored by Gelson Fernandes
No.	Date	Venue	Cap	Opponent	Score	Result	Competition	Ref.
1	28 March 2009	Zimbru Stadium, Chișinău, Moldova	17	Moldova	2–0	2–0	2010 FIFA World Cup qualification	
2	16 June 2010	Moses Mabhida Stadium, Durban, South Africa	25	Spain	1–0	1–0	2010 FIFA World Cup	

== Honours ==
FC Sion

- Swiss Cup: 2005–06

Eintracht Frankfurt

- DFB-Pokal: 2017–18
