= Paul-Georges Ntep =

Cameroonian footballer (born 1992)

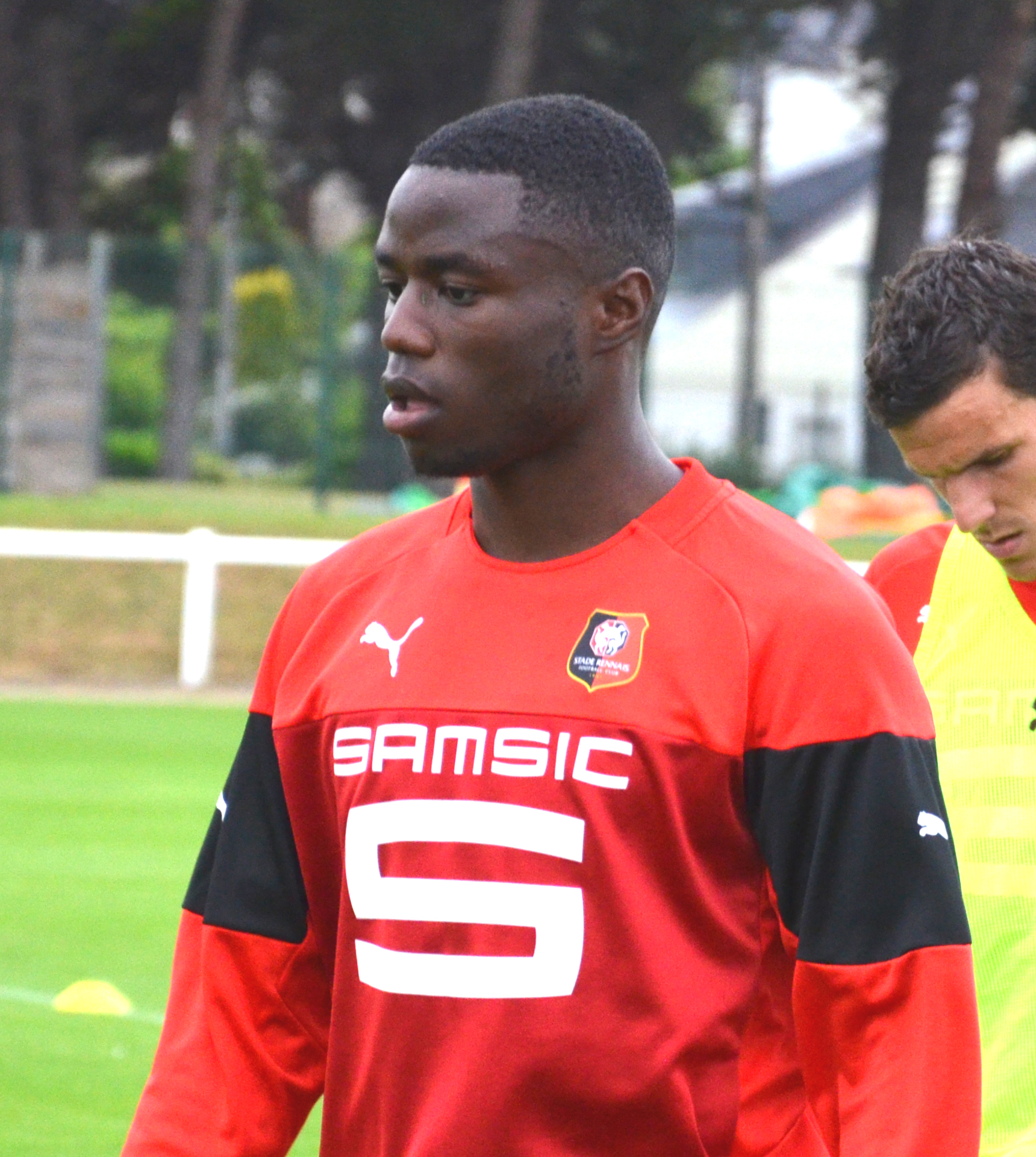
- Ntep with Rennes in 2014

Personal information
- Full name: Paul-Georges Ntep de Madiba
- Date of birth: 29 July 1992 (age 34)
- Place of birth: Douala, Cameroon
- Height: 1.80 m (5 ft 11 in)
- Positions: Winger; forward

Youth career
- 2001–2003: U.S Grigny
- 2003–2005: FC Draveil
- 2005–2007: Viry-Châtillon
- 2007–2008: Linas-Montlhéry
- 2008–2009: Brétigny Foot
- 2009–2012: Auxerre

Senior career*
Years	Team	Apps	(Gls)
2010–2013	Auxerre B	37	(7)
2012–2014	Auxerre	51	(15)
2014–2017	Rennes	74	(18)
2017–2020	VfL Wolfsburg	15	(0)
2018	→ Saint-Étienne (loan)	13	(1)
2019	VfL Wolfsburg II	3	(0)
2019–2020	→ Kayserispor (loan)	5	(0)
2020–2021	Guingamp	14	(0)
2021–2022	Boavista	16	(1)
2023–2024	Ho Chi Minh City	9	(1)

International career
2010	France U18	1	(0)
2011	France U19	2	(0)
2013	France U20	5	(2)
2013–2014	France U21	15	(9)
2015	France	2	(0)
2018–2019	Cameroon	4	(1)
- * Club domestic league appearances and goals

Paul-Georges Ntep de Madiba (born 29 July 1992) is a Cameroonian former professional footballer who played as a winger or forward. He was a France youth international, and eventually made two appearances for the France national team in 2015. He later switched his allegiance, playing four matches and scoring one goal for the Cameroon national team from 2018 to 2019.

== Club career ==
Ntep was born in Douala, the largest city in Cameroon. He moved to France at the age of eight to live with his aunt who was situated in the commune of Grigny in southern Paris. He began his career at US Ris Orangis and spent two years at the club. During his stint with Ris Orangis, he embarked on several trials with professional clubs, which included Auxerre, however, he was not signed. In 2005, Ntep joined the under-14 team of Viry-Châtillon and, after a year's stint with another amateur club (ESA Linas-Montlhéry), signed with CS Brétigny Foot; a club that trained French internationals Patrice Evra and Jimmy Briand. While training at Brétigny, Ntep impressed club coaches and officials and, in 2009, was offered a three-day trial with professional club Auxerre, with whom Brétigny share a partnership. After a successful trial, he was signed to an stagiaire (internship) contract.

=== Auxerre ===
Ntep began the 2009–10 season training with the club's under-18 team. Midway through the season, he joined the club's reserve team in the Championnat de France amateur. Ntep appeared in 14 matches for the team scoring two goals. For the 2010–11 season, he began training with the senior team. Ntep was also named to the team's roster to appear in the UEFA Champions League. On 16 October 2010, he made the bench in the team's 1–0 defeat to Bordeaux. A week later, Ntep made his professional debut in a Coupe de la Ligue match against Bastia appearing as a substitute in the 31st minute for Dennis Oliech. Auxerre won the match 4–0.

=== Rennes ===
On 30 January 2014, Ntep joined Ligue 1 side Stade Rennais on a three-and-a-half-year deal.

=== VfL Wolfsburg ===
In January 2017, Ntep joined the squad of German Bundesliga team VfL Wolfsburg on a contract until 2021. On 11 February 2020, Wolfsburg released Ntep.

=== Saint-Étienne (loan) ===
On 17 January 2018, Ntep joined Ligue 1 side Saint-Étienne on a season-long loan.

=== Kayserispor (loan) ===
On 25 August 2019, Ntep joined Turkish club Kayserispor on a season-long loan.

=== Guingamp ===
On 13 May 2020, Guingamp confirmed the signing of Ntep on a free transfer.

=== Boavista ===
After a disappointing season in Ligue 2, his contract with Guingamp ended and Ntep once again became a free agent, allowing him to join Primeira Liga club Boavista after the end of the regular transfer window, being announced as a new signing on 4 September 2021 by the Porto team. With a total of 19 appearances for Boavista, and one goal, Ntep left the club at the end of the 2021–22 season.

=== Ho Chi Minh City ===
On 26 September 2023, Ntep signed for V.League 1 club Ho Chi Minh City on a free transfer. He played his tenth and last game with the Vietnamese side in March 2024.

=== Retirement ===
In December 2024, he announced his retirement from football at 32 years old, after having been a free agent for nine months.

== International career ==
=== France ===
Though Ntep was born in Cameroon, he is a French youth international having starred for the under-18 team in 2010. Three years later, he received the call from France U21 to compete in the Toulon Tournament.

He is eligible to play for either Cameroon or France at senior level. On 24 May 2015, Ntep received a call-up to France's senior squad by coach Didier Deschamps to play in friendlies against Belgium and Albania. He made his debut on 7 June 2015 in a 4–3 defeat to Belgium.

=== Cameroon ===
In August 2018 Ntep switched his allegiance to Cameroon and was nominated for the match against Comoros in the 2019 Africa Cup of Nations qualification Group B.

== Style of play ==
At the age of 18, Ntep was known for his quick pace and technical skill as a striker.

== Personal life ==
Ntep is the cousin of the rugby player Charles-Edouard Ekwah Elimby and the footballers Pierre Ekwah, Ludéric, Romaric and Emeric Etonde.

== Career statistics ==
Scores and results list Cameroon's goal tally first, score column indicates score after each Ntep goal.

List of international goals scored by Paul-Georges Ntep
No.	Date	Venue	Opponent	Score	Result	Competition
1	9 June 2019	Estadio Cerro del Espino, Majadahonda, Spain	Zambia	1–0	2–1	Friendly
