= 2016–17 AS Monaco FC season =

Monaco
2016–17 season
- President: Dmitry Rybolovlev
- Head coach: Leonardo Jardim
- Stadium: Stade Louis II
- Ligue 1: 1st
- Coupe de France: Semi-finals
- Coupe de la Ligue: Runners-up
- UEFA Champions League: Semi-finals
- Top goalscorer: League: Radamel Falcao (21); All: Radamel Falcao (30)
- Highest home attendance: 17,135 vs Borussia Dortmund (Champions League, 19 April 2017)
- Lowest home attendance: 2,000 vs Ajaccio (Coupe de France, 6 January 2017)
- Average home league attendance: 9,315
- Biggest win: 7–0 vs Metz (Ligue 1, 1 October 2016); 7–0 vs Rennes (Coupe de la Ligue, 14 December 2016)
- Biggest defeat: 0–5 vs Paris Saint-Germain (Coupe de France, 26 April 2017)
Home colours	Away colours	Third colours

The 2016–17 season was AS Monaco FC's fourth consecutive season in Ligue 1 since promotion from Ligue 2 in 2013. In addition to the domestic league, they participated in the Coupe de France, the Coupe de la Ligue and the UEFA Champions League.

Following aggregate victories over Fenerbahçe and Villarreal, Monaco qualified for the group stage of the Champions League, and sealed their place in the last 16 as group winners following a 2–1 win over Tottenham Hotspur on the fifth matchday. Monaco defeated Manchester City on away goals in the round of 16 and recorded a 6–3 aggregate win over Borussia Dortmund in the quarter-finals, reaching the semi-finals of the Champions League for the first time since 2004; they failed to reach the final after a 4–1 aggregate defeat to Juventus.

Monaco also won Ligue 1 for the first time since 2000, preventing Paris Saint-Germain from claiming a fifth consecutive title. They went on a twelve-match winning run to close out the season and finished their league campaign with 95 points and 107 goals scored. The club additionally reached the final of the Coupe de la Ligue and the semi-finals of the Coupe de France; they were eliminated by PSG in both competitions.

== Players ==
=== First-team squad ===
As of 29 January 2017

Note: Flags indicate national team as defined under FIFA eligibility rules; some limited exceptions apply. Players may hold more than one non-FIFA nationality.

No.	Pos.	Nation	Player
1	GK	CRO	Danijel Subašić
2	DF	BRA	Fabinho
5	DF	BRA	Jemerson
6	DF	BRA	Jorge
7	MF	MAR	Nabil Dirar
8	MF	POR	João Moutinho
9	FW	COL	Radamel Falcao (captain)
10	MF	POR	Bernardo Silva
11	FW	ARG	Guido Carrillo
14	MF	FRA	Tiémoué Bakayoko
16	GK	ITA	Morgan De Sanctis
18	FW	FRA	Valère Germain
19	DF	FRA	Djibril Sidibé
23	DF	FRA	Benjamin Mendy

No.	Pos.	Nation	Player
24	DF	ITA	Andrea Raggi
25	DF	POL	Kamil Glik
26	MF	BRA	Gabriel Boschilia
27	MF	FRA	Thomas Lemar
29	FW	FRA	Kylian Mbappé
30	GK	SEN	Seydou Sy
34	DF	FRA	Abdou Diallo
35	DF	FRA	Kévin N'Doram
37	FW	FRA	Irvin Cardona
38	DF	MLI	Almamy Touré
40	GK	FRA	Loïc Badiashile
45	DF	FRA	Pierre-Daniel N'Guinda
—	MF	FRA	Dylan Beaulieu
—	MF	FRA	Corentin Tirard

=== Reserves ===
Note: Flags indicate national team as defined under FIFA eligibility rules; some limited exceptions apply. Players may hold more than one non-FIFA nationality.

No.	Pos.	Nation	Player
—	GK	FRA	Emmanuel Mifsud
—	GK	FRA	Tony Tropeano
—	DF	FRA	Safwan Mbaé
—	DF	FRA	Yoann Etienne
—	DF	FRA	Salif Dramé
—	DF	FRA	Julien Serrano
—	DF	CIV	Kouadio-Yves Dabila
—	DF	FRA	Dylan Ouédraogo
—	DF	FRA	Jonathan Cissé
—	DF	POR	Rúben Vinagre

No.	Pos.	Nation	Player
—	MF	FRA	Chahreddine Boukholda
—	MF	FRA	Tristan Muyumba
—	MF	FRA	Kévin Appin
—	MF	FRA	Guévin Tormin
—	MF	CIV	Kouakou Serge-Armand Aka
—	MF	BEL	Adrien Bongiovanni
—	MF	FRA	Franck Irie
—	MF	FRA	Christopher Lina
—	MF	FRA	Johan Rotsen
—	FW	FRA	Brighton Labeau

=== Out on loan ===
Note: Flags indicate national team as defined under FIFA eligibility rules; some limited exceptions apply. Players may hold more than one non-FIFA nationality.

No.	Pos.	Nation	Player
20	MF	MLI	Adama Traoré (at (Portugal) Rio Ave)
28	MF	FRA	Corentin Jean (at Toulouse)
—	GK	FRA	Paul Nardi (at (Belgium) Cercle Brugge)
—	DF	FRA	Mehdi Beneddine (at (Belgium) Cercle Brugge)
—	DF	FRA	Raphaël Diarra (at (Belgium) Cercle Brugge)
—	DF	NGR	Elderson Echiéjilé (at (Spain) Sporting Gijón)
—	MF	MAR	Youssef Aït Bennasser (at Nancy)
—	MF	FRA	Jonathan Mexique (at Red Star)

No.	Pos.	Nation	Player
—	MF	POR	Gil Dias (at (Portugal) Rio Ave)
—	MF	POR	Rony Lopes (at Lille)
—	FW	CIV	Lacina Traoré (at (Spain) Sporting Gijón)
—	FW	FRA	Ilyes Chaïbi (at Ajaccio)
—	FW	FRA	Allan Saint-Maximin (at Bastia)
—	FW	FRA	Quentin Ngakoutou (at (Belgium) Union Saint-Gilloise)
—	FW	GUI	Tafsir Chérif (at (Belgium) Cercle Brugge)

== Transfers ==
=== Summer ===
In: Note: Flags indicate national team as defined under FIFA eligibility rules; some limited exceptions apply. Players may hold more than one non-FIFA nationality.

No.	Pos.	Nation	Player
9	FW	COL	Radamel Falcao (loan return from (England) Chelsea)
16	GK	ITA	Morgan De Sanctis (from (Italy) Roma)
18	FW	FRA	Valère Germain (loan return from (France) Nice)
19	DF	FRA	Djibril Sidibé (from (France) Lille)
23	DF	FRA	Benjamin Mendy (from (France) Marseille)
25	DF	POL	Kamil Glik (from (Italy) Torino)
26	MF	BRA	Gabriel Boschilia (loan return from (Belgium) Standard Liège)
28	FW	FRA	Corentin Jean (loan return from (France) Troyes)
32	DF	COD	Marcel Tisserand (loan return from (France) Toulouse)
34	DF	FRA	Abdou Diallo (loan return from (Belgium) Zulte Waregem)
—	MF	MAR	Youssef Aït Bennasser (from (France) Nancy)
—	FW	CAF	Quentin Ngakoutou (loan return from (France) Évian)
—	FW	FRA	Christopher Lina (loan return from (France) Bastia)

Out: Note: Flags indicate national team as defined under FIFA eligibility rules; some limited exceptions apply. Players may hold more than one non-FIFA nationality.

No.	Pos.	Nation	Player
4	DF	POR	Fábio Coentrão (loan return to (Spain) Real Madrid)
6	DF	POR	Ricardo Carvalho
9	FW	BRA	Vágner Love (to (Turkey) Alanyaspor)
12	MF	FRA	Farès Bahlouli (loan to (Belgium) Standard Liège)
13	DF	BRA	Wallace (loan return to (Portugal) Braga)
16	GK	FRA	Paul Nardi (loan to (France) Rennes)
17	FW	POR	Ivan Cavaleiro (to (England) Wolverhampton Wanderers)
18	MF	POR	Hélder Costa (loan return to (Portugal) Benfica)
19	FW	CIV	Lacina Traoré (loan to (Russia) CSKA Moscow)
20	MF	CRO	Mario Pašalić (loan return to (England) Chelsea)
21	DF	NGR	Elderson Echiéjilé (loan to (Belgium) Standard Liège)
25	MF	POR	Rony Lopes (loan to (France) Lille)
28	MF	FRA	Jérémy Toulalan (to (France) Bordeaux)
32	DF	COD	Marcel Tisserand (to (Germany) FC Ingolstadt)
—	DF	FRA	Raphaël Diarra (loan to (Belgium) Cercle Brugge)
—	DF	POR	Dinis Almeida (loan to (Portugal) Belenenses)
—	MF	CGO	Delvin N'Dinga (to (Russia) Lokomotiv Moscow, previously on loan)
—	MF	FRA	Sébastien Amoros (loan to (England) Port Vale)
—	MF	FRA	Dylan Bahamboula (to (France) Dijon, previously on loan to (France) Paris FC)
—	MF	FRA	Jonathan Mexique (loan to (France) Red Star)
—	MF	FRA	Jessy Pi (to (France) Toulouse, previously on loan to (France) Troyes)
—	MF	MAR	Youssef Aït Bennasser (loan to (France) Nancy)
—	MF	MAR	Fawzi Ouaamar (to (Morocco) Chabab Rif Al Hoceima)
—	MF	POR	Gil Dias (loan to (Portugal) Rio Ave, previously on loan to (Spain) Varzim)
—	FW	CMR	Edgar Salli (to (Germany) 1. FC Nürnberg, previously on loan to (Switzerland) St. Gallen)
—	FW	FRA	Ilyes Chaïbi (loan to (France) Ajaccio)
—	FW	FRA	Allan Saint-Maximin (loan to (France) Bastia, previously on loan to (Germany) Hannover 96)
—	FW	GUI	Tafsir Chérif (loan to (Portugal) Rio Ave, previously on loan to (Portugal) Varzim)

=== Winter ===
In: Note: Flags indicate national team as defined under FIFA eligibility rules; some limited exceptions apply. Players may hold more than one non-FIFA nationality.

No.	Pos.	Nation	Player
6	DF	BRA	Jorge (from (Brazil) Flamengo)

Out: Note: Flags indicate national team as defined under FIFA eligibility rules; some limited exceptions apply. Players may hold more than one non-FIFA nationality.

No.	Pos.	Nation	Player
12	MF	FRA	Farès Bahlouli (to (France) Lille)
16	GK	FRA	Paul Nardi (loan to (Belgium) Cercle Brugge, previously on loan to (France) Rennes)
20	MF	MLI	Adama Traoré (loan to (Portugal) Rio Ave)
21	DF	NGR	Elderson Echiéjilé (loan to (Spain) Sporting Gijón, previously on loan to (Belgium) Standard Liège)
28	FW	FRA	Corentin Jean (loan to (France) Toulouse)
—	DF	FRA	Mehdi Beneddine (loan to (Belgium) Cercle Brugge)
—	FW	FRA	Quentin Ngakoutou (loan to (Belgium) Union SG)
—	FW	GUI	Tafsir Chérif (loan to (Belgium) Cercle Brugge, previously on loan to (Portugal) Rio Ave)
—	FW	CIV	Lacina Traoré (loan to (Spain) Sporting Gijón, previously on loan to (Russia) CSKA Moscow)

== Friendlies ==
2 July 2016 Friendly	Lugano	3–5	Monaco	Lugano, Switzerland
17:30 CEST (UTC+2)	Črnigoj 10'; Šušnjar 65' (pen.), 90'	Report	Dirar 18', 43'; Lemar 21'; Falcao 36'; Carrillo 77'	Stadium: Cornaredo Stadium

3 July 2016 Friendly	Kriens	3–3	Monaco	Lugano, Switzerland
16:30 CEST (UTC+2)	5'; 27'; 36' (pen.)	Report	Echiéjilé 10'; Vágner Love 19' Germain 59'	Stadium: Cornaredo Stadium

9 July 2016 Friendly	Sion	3–3	Monaco	Bagnes, Switzerland
17:00 CEST (UTC+2)	Konaté 50'; Akolo 72'; Jemerson 90+1' (o.g.)	Report	Germain 40'; Falcao 53' (pen.); Touré 84'	Stadium: Stade St Marc

12 July 2016 Friendly	Luzern	2–1	Monaco	Renens, Switzerland
17:30 CEST (UTC+2)	Neumayr 37'; Hyka 51'	Report	A. Traoré 39'	Stadium: Stade de Censuy

13 July 2016 Friendly	Sporting CP	1–4	Monaco	Lausanne, Switzerland
20:30 CEST (UTC+2)	Podence 21'	Report	Germain 12'; Falcao 23', 66'; Carrillo 82'	Stadium: Stade Samaranch

16 July 2016 Friendly	Basel	0–1	Monaco	Montreux, Switzerland
15:00 CEST (UTC+2)		Report	Boschilia 32'	Stadium: Stade Eugène Parlier

19 July 2016 Friendly	Zenit Saint Petersburg	3–1	Monaco	Renens, Switzerland
17:00 CEST (UTC+2)	Đorđević 46', 48'; Kerzhakov 50'	Report	Falcao 31'	Stadium: Stade de Censuy

7 August 2016 Friendly	Napoli	5–0	Monaco	Naples, Italy
21:00 CEST (UTC+2)	Gabbiadini 3', 16', 48' (pen.), 64'; Allan 66'	Report		Stadium: Stadio San Paolo

== Competitions ==
=== Overview ===
Competition	First match	Last match	Starting round	Final position	Record							
Competition	First match	Last match	Starting round	Final position	Pld	W	D	L	GF	GA	GD	Win %
Ligue 1	12 August 2016	20 May 2017	Matchday 1	Winners	38	30	5	3	107	31	+76	78.95
Coupe de France	6 January 2017	26 April 2017	Round of 64	Semi-finals	5	4	0	1	13	14	−1	80.00
Coupe de la Ligue	14 December 2016	1 April 2017	Round of 16	Runners-up	4	2	1	1	10	5	+5	50.00
UEFA Champions League	27 July 2016	9 May 2017	Third qualifying round	Semi-finals	16	9	2	5	29	24	+5	56.25
Total					63	45	8	10	159	74	+85	71.43

Source: Soccerway

=== Ligue 1 ===
==== League table ====
Pos	Team	Pld	W	D	L	GF	GA	GD	Pts	Qualification or relegation
1	Monaco (C)	38	30	5	3	107	31	+76	95	Qualification for the Champions League group stage
2	Paris Saint-Germain	38	27	6	5	83	27	+56	87	Qualification for the Champions League group stage
3	Nice	38	22	12	4	63	36	+27	78	Qualification for the Champions League third qualifying round
4	Lyon	38	21	4	13	77	48	+29	67	Qualification for the Europa League group stage (Note: Since the winners of the 2016–17 Coupe de France and the 2016–17 Coupe de la Ligue, Paris Saint-Germain, qualified for European competition based on league position, the spot awarded to the Coupe de France winners (Europa League group stage) was passed to the fourth-placed team and the spot awarded to the Coupe de la Ligue winners (Europa League third qualifying round) was passed to the sixth-placed team. The fifth-placed team received the spot in Europa League third qualifying round originally designated to the fourth-placed team.)
5	Marseille	38	17	11	10	57	41	+16	62	Qualification for the Europa League third qualifying round

Source: Ligue 1, Soccerway
Rules for classification: 1) Points; 2) Goal difference; 3) Goals scored; 4) Head-to-head goal difference; 5) Fairplay ranking.
(C) Champions

==== Results summary ====
Overall								Home						Away					
Pld	W	D	L	GF	GA	GD	Pts	W	D	L	GF	GA	GD	W	D	L	GF	GA	GD
38	30	5	3	107	31	+76	95	17	1	1	63	14	+49	13	4	2	44	17	+27

Source: Competitive matches

==== Results by round ====
Round	1	2	3	4	5	6	7	8	9	10	11	12	13	14	15	16	17	18	19	20	21	22	23	24	25	26	27	28	29	30	31	32	33	34	35	36	37	38
Ground	H	A	H	A	H	A	H	A	A	H	A	H	A	H	A	H	A	H	H	A	H	A	H	A	H	A	A	H	H	A	A	H	A	H	A	H	H	A
Result	D	W	W	W	W	L	W	W	L	W	D	W	W	W	D	W	W	L	W	W	W	D	W	W	W	D	W	W	W	W	W	W	W	W	W	W	W	W
Position	10	6	2	1	1	3	2	2	2	2	2	2	2	2	3	2	2	2	2	1	1	1	1	1	1	1	1	1	1	1	1	1	1	1	1	1	1	1

Source: Competitive matches
A = Away; H = Home; W = Win; D = Draw; L = Loss

==== Matches ====
12 August 2016 1	Monaco	2–2	Guingamp	Monaco
20:30 CEST (UTC+2)	Mendy (yellow card) 32'; Dirar (yellow card) 65'; Fabinho 71' (pen.), (yellow card) 90+4'; Silva 84'	Report	Ikoko (yellow card) 12'; Diallo (yellow card) 15', (goal) 29'; Privat 37'; Blas (yellow card) 70'; Kerbrat (yellow card) 76'	Stadium: Stade Louis II; Attendance: 8,019; Referee: Jérôme Miguelgorry

20 August 2016 2	Nantes	0–1	Monaco	Nantes
17:00 CEST (UTC+2)	Gillet (yellow card) 83'; Diego Carlos (yellow card) 89'	Report	Boschilia 25'; Tisserand (yellow card) 33'; Glik (yellow card) 87'; Subašić (yellow card) 89'; Jean (yellow card) 90+2'	Stadium: Stade de la Beaujoire; Attendance: 25,908; Referee: Stéphane Lannoy

28 August 2016 3	Monaco	3–1	Paris Saint-Germain	Monaco
20:45 CEST (UTC+2)	Moutinho 13'; Bakayoko (yellow card) 24'; Fabinho 45+2' (pen.); Aurier 80' (o.g.)	Report	Cavani (yellow card) 27', (goal) 63'; David Luiz (yellow card) 45+1'	Stadium: Stade Louis II; Attendance: 15,219; Referee: Ruddy Buquet

10 September 2016 4	Lille	1–4	Monaco	Villeneuve d'Ascq
20:00 CEST (UTC+2)	Palmieri (yellow card) 44', (goal) 90'; Bauthéac (yellow card) 76'; Amadou (yellow card) 83'	Report	Sidibé 2'; Traoré 17'; Bakayoko (yellow card) 45+1'; Fabinho 47'; Glik 71'	Stadium: Stade Pierre-Mauroy; Attendance: 29,373; Referee: Tony Chapron

17 September 2016 5	Monaco	3–0	Rennes	Monaco
17:00 CEST (UTC+2)	Falcao 42'; Traoré (yellow card) 52'; Lemar 90', 90+2'	Report	Sio (yellow card) 52'	Stadium: Stade Louis II; Attendance: 4,000; Referee: Frank Schneider

21 September 2016 6	Nice	4–0	Monaco	Nice
19:00 CEST (UTC+2)	Baysse 17'; Balotelli 30', 68'; Belhanda (yellow card) 45'; Pléa (penalty missed) 84', 86'	Report	Falcao (yellow card) 21'; Bakayoko (red card) 83'	Stadium: Allianz Riviera; Attendance: 21,867; Referee: Benoît Bastien

24 September 2016 7	Monaco	2–1	Angers	Monaco
20:00 CEST (UTC+2)	Glik 66'; Fabinho (yellow card) 73'; Nwakaeme 76' (o.g.)	Report	Diedhiou 55'; Nwakaeme (yellow card) 75'	Stadium: Stade Louis II; Attendance: 6,019; Referee: Jérôme Miguelgorry

1 October 2016 8	Metz	0–7	Monaco	Metz
20:00 CEST (UTC+2)	Biševac (yellow card) 4'; Cohade (yellow card) 32'; Doukouré (red card) 60'	Report	Lemar 8'; Germain 23'; Silva 40'; Fabinho 68' (pen.); Carrillo 72', 83'; Sidibé (yellow card) 76'; Boschilia 89'	Stadium: Stade Saint-Symphorien; Attendance: 19,163; Referee: Ruddy Buquet

14 October 2016 9	Toulouse	3–1	Monaco	Toulouse
19:00 CEST (UTC+2)	Braithwaite (yellow card) 21', (goal) 84', 87'; Trejo 65'; Diop (yellow card) 80'	Report	Germain 4'; Glik (yellow card) 29'	Stadium: Stadium Municipal; Attendance: 17,602; Referee: Lionel Jaffredo

21 October 2016 10	Monaco	6–2	Montpellier	Monaco
20:45 CEST (UTC+2)	Glik (yellow card) 8'; Falcao 36' (pen.); Mbappé 49'; Jemerson 64', (yellow card) 72'; Germain 74'; Lemar 76'; Traoré 89'	Report	Boudebouz 9', 61' (pen.)	Stadium: Stade Louis II; Attendance: 7,619; Referee: Amaury Delerue

29 October 2016 11	Saint-Étienne	1–1	Monaco	Saint-Étienne
20:00 CEST (UTC+2)	Perrin 18'	Report	Glik 5', (yellow card) 58'; Mendy (yellow card) 49'; Fabinho (yellow card) 53'; Jemerson (yellow card) 82'	Stadium: Stade Geoffroy-Guichard; Attendance: 35,890; Referee: Ruddy Buquet

5 November 2016 12	Monaco	6–0	Nancy	Monaco
17:00 CET (UTC+1)	Falcao 25', 30' (pen.); Mbappé 65'; Carrillo 87', 90+2'; Fabinho 90' (pen.)	Report	Badila (yellow card) 60'	Stadium: Stade Louis II; Attendance: 5,539; Referee: François Letexier

18 November 2016 13	Lorient	0–3	Monaco	Lorient
19:00 CET (UTC+1)		Report	Jemerson (yellow card) 27'; Falcao 64'; Lemar 67'; Boschilia 90+2'	Stadium: Stade du Moustoir; Attendance: 9,574; Referee: Fredy Fautrel

26 November 2016 14	Monaco	4–0	Marseille	Monaco
17:10 CET (UTC+1)	Boschilia 23', (yellow card) 23'; Germain 29', 39'; Carrillo 90+1'	Report	Gomis (yellow card) 13'; Alessandrini (yellow card) 23'	Stadium: Stade Louis II; Attendance: 14,089; Referee: Clément Turpin

29 November 2016 15	Dijon	1–1	Monaco	Dijon
21:00 CET (UTC+1)	Rivière (yellow card) 20'; Sammaritano (yellow card) 84', (goal) 87'	Report	Carrillo 17'	Stadium: Stade Gaston Gérard; Attendance: 10,263; Referee: Tony Chapron

3 December 2016 16	Monaco	5–0	Bastia	Monaco
20:00 CET (UTC+1)	Mbappé 10', (yellow card) 69'; Fabinho (yellow card) 17'; Jemerson (yellow card) 21'; Lemar 66'; Falcao 68', 73'; Carrillo 79'	Report	Cioni (yellow card) 23'; Danic (yellow card) 38'; Crivelli (yellow card) 80'	Stadium: Stade Louis II; Attendance: 7,019; Referee: Benoît Millot

10 December 2016 17	Bordeaux	0–4	Monaco	Bordeaux
17:00 CET (UTC+1)	Laborde (yellow card) 51'; Pallois (yellow card) 62'; Plašil (yellow card) 63'; Ounas (red card) 68'	Report	Sidibé 2'; Falcao 5', 50', 64' (pen.); Mendy (yellow card) 84'	Stadium: Nouveau Stade de Bordeaux; Attendance: 38,803; Referee: Benoît Bastien

18 December 2016 18	Monaco	1–3	Lyon	Monaco
20:45 CET (UTC+1)	Sidibé (yellow card) 26'; Mendy (red card) 39'; Silva (yellow card) 52'; Fabinho (yellow card) 53'; Glik (yellow card) 56'; Bakayoko 70'	Report	Ghezzal 29'; Yanga-Mbiwa (yellow card) 42'; Lacazette (penalty missed) 56', 87'; Valbuena 65', (yellow card) 74'	Stadium: Stade Louis II; Attendance: 13,129; Referee: Ruddy Buquet

21 December 2016 19	Monaco	2–1	Caen	Monaco
20:50 CET (UTC+1)	Falcao (yellow card) 40', (goal) 48' (pen.); Mbappé (yellow card) 54'; Glik (yellow card) 65'; Bakayoko 76'	Report	Da Silva (yellow card) 2' (yellow-red card) 51'; Bazile 90+4'	Stadium: Stade Louis II; Attendance: 4,319; Referee: Bartolomeu Varela

15 January 2017 20	Marseille	1–4	Monaco	Marseille
21:00 CET (UTC+1)	Rolando 28'; Lopez (yellow card) 65'	Report	Lemar 15'; Falcao 21'; Silva (yellow card) 34', (goal) 45', 56'	Stadium: Stade Vélodrome; Attendance: 43,814; Referee: Clément Turpin

22 January 2017 21	Monaco	4–0	Lorient	Monaco
15:00 CET (UTC+1)	Boschilia 24', 28'; Germain 37', 59'; Sidibé (yellow card) 90'	Report	Lautoa (yellow card) 11'	Stadium: Stade Louis II; Attendance: 5,549; Referee: Amaury Delerue

29 January 2017 22	Paris Saint-Germain	1–1	Monaco	Paris
20:00 CET (UTC+1)	Cavani 81' (pen.)	Report	Sidibé (yellow card) 80'; Silva 90+2'	Stadium: Parc des Princes; Attendance: 47,238; Referee: Frank Schneider

4 February 2017 23	Monaco	3–0	Nice	Monaco
17:00 CET (UTC+1)	Germain 48'; Jemerson (yellow card) 57'; Falcao 60', 81'	Report	Seri (yellow card) 13'	Stadium: Stade Louis II; Attendance: 16,049; Referee: Benoît Bastien

7 February 2017 24	Montpellier	1–2	Monaco	Montpellier
19:00 CET (UTC+1)	Sylla (yellow card) 15'; Hilton 47'	Report	Glik 16'; Mbappé 20'; Mendy (yellow card) 72'; Jemerson (yellow card) 82' (yellow-red card) 88'	Stadium: Stade de la Mosson; Attendance: 12,433; Referee: Mikael Lesage

11 February 2017 25	Monaco	5–0	Metz	Monaco
20:00 CET (UTC+1)	Mbappé 7', 20', 49'; Falcao 10', 55'; Mendy (yellow card) 61'	Report	Mollet (yellow card) 63'; Rivierez (yellow card) 66'; Signorino (yellow card) 77'	Stadium: Stade Louis II; Attendance: 6,069; Referee: Olivier Thual

17 February 2017 26	Bastia	1–1	Monaco	Bastia
20:45 CET (UTC+1)	Diallo 19'; Coulibaly (yellow card) 21'; Nangis (yellow card) 89'	Report	Silva 52'	Stadium: Stade Armand Cesari; Attendance: 10,059; Referee: Clément Turpin

25 February 2017 27	Guingamp	1–2	Monaco	Guingamp
17:00 CET (UTC+1)	Ikoko (yellow card) 62'; Johnsson (yellow card) 86'; Didot 90', (yellow card) 90+3'	Report	Glik 24'; Fabinho (yellow card) 33', (goal) 86' (pen.); Sidibé (yellow card) 64'	Stadium: Stade de Roudourou; Attendance: 15,912; Referee: Amaury Delerue

5 March 2017 28	Monaco	4–0	Nantes	Monaco
21:00 CET (UTC+1)	Mbappé 4', 45+1'; Germain 43'; Jemerson (yellow card) 45'; Fabinho 59' (pen.); Sidibé (yellow card) 66'	Report	Pardo (yellow card) 42'; Bammou (yellow card) 88'	Stadium: Stade Louis II; Attendance: 7,649; Referee: Mikael Lesage

11 March 2017 29	Monaco	2–1	Bordeaux	Monaco
16:45 CET (UTC+1)	Fabinho (yellow card) 27'; Mbappé 68'; Moutinho 74'	Report	Rolán 84'; Ménez (yellow card) 88'; Gajić (yellow card) 88'; Pallois (yellow card) 90+2'	Stadium: Stade Louis II; Attendance: 11,009; Referee: Ruddy Buquet

19 March 2017 30	Caen	0–3	Monaco	Caen
15:00 CET (UTC+1)	Da Silva (yellow card) 38'	Report	Mbappé 19', 81'; Fabinho 49' (pen.)	Stadium: Stade Michel d'Ornano; Attendance: 19,399; Referee: Antony Gautier

8 April 2017 32	Angers	0–1	Monaco	Angers
17:00 CEST (UTC+2)	Mangani (yellow card) 77'; N'Doye (yellow card) 84'	Report	Falcao 61'; Dirar (yellow card) 77'	Stadium: Stade Jean-Bouin; Attendance: 15,235; Referee: Bartolomeu Varela

15 April 2017 33	Monaco	2–1	Dijon	Monaco
21:00 CEST (UTC+2)	Fabinho (yellow card) 59'; Dirar 69'; Falcao 81'	Report	Varrault 42'; Sammaritano (yellow card) 67'; Lees-Melou (yellow card) 68'; Bouka Moutou (yellow card) 90+2'	Stadium: Stade Louis II; Attendance: 9,069; Referee: Jérôme Miguelgorry

23 April 2017 34	Lyon	1–2	Monaco	Lyon
21:15 CEST (UTC+2)	Ferri (yellow card) 22'; Tousart 51'; Rafael (yellow card) 67'	Report	Falcao 36'; Mbappé 44'; Lemar (yellow card) 65'	Stadium: Parc Olympique Lyonnais; Attendance: 44,411; Referee: Benoît Bastien

29 April 2017 35	Monaco	3–1	Toulouse	Monaco
17:00 CEST (UTC+2)	Glik 49'; Mbappé 64'; Mendy (yellow card) 66'; Lemar 75'	Report	Toivonen (yellow card) 17', (goal) 46'; Doumbia (yellow card) 30'; Somália (yellow card) 35'; Trejo (yellow card) 87'	Stadium: Stade Louis II; Attendance: 9,169; Referee: Mikael Lesage

6 May 2017 36	Nancy	0–3	Monaco	Nancy
21:00 CEST (UTC+2)	Robic (yellow card) 8'	Report	Badila 3' (o.g.); Sidibé (yellow card) 35'; Silva 40'; Lemar 86'	Stadium: Stade Marcel-Picot; Attendance: 19,519; Referee: Ruddy Buquet

14 May 2017 37	Monaco	4–0	Lille	Monaco
21:15 CEST (UTC+2)	Falcao 6', 69'; Silva 45+2'; Jemerson (yellow card) 48'; Alonso 89' (o.g.)	Report	Sliti (yellow card) 51'; Mavuba (yellow card) 58'	Stadium: Stade Louis II; Attendance: 13,152; Referee: Benoît Bastien

17 May 2017 31	Monaco	2–0	Saint-Étienne	Monaco
21:00 CEST (UTC+2)	Mbappé 19'; Silva (yellow card) 67'; Germain 90+2'	Report	Lacroix (yellow card) 78'	Stadium: Stade Louis II; Attendance: 14,299; Referee: Clément Turpin

20 May 2017 38	Rennes	2–3	Monaco	Rennes
21:00 CEST (UTC+2)	Diakhaby 69' (pen.), 90+1'	Report	Fabinho 42'; Jemerson 48'; Jorge 78'	Stadium: Roazhon Park; Attendance: 26,565; Referee: Saïd Ennjimi

=== Coupe de France ===
6 January 2017 Round of 64	Monaco	2–1	Ajaccio	Monaco
21:00 CET (UTC+1)	Falcao 19'; Germain 67'; Sidibé (yellow card) 90+4'	Report	Pierre-Charles (yellow card) 61'; Cavalli 65' (pen.); Boé-Kane (yellow card) 90+1'	Stadium: Stade Louis II; Attendance: 2,000; Referee: Sébastien Desiage

1 February 2017 Round of 32	Chambly	4–5 (a.e.t.)	Monaco	Beauvais
18:00 CET (UTC+1)	Soubervie 57', 90+3'; Padovani (yellow card) 70', (goal) 111'; Gendrey 81'; L. Doucouré (yellow card) 90+2'; Burel (yellow card) 92'	Report	Carrillo 17'; Lemar 34'; Mbappé 48'; Raggi (red card) 89'; N'Doram (yellow card) 90', (goal) 96'; Glik 103'	Stadium: Stade Pierre Brisson; Attendance: 7,555; Referee: Johan Hamel

1 March 2017 Round of 16	Marseille	3–4 (a.e.t.)	Monaco	Marseille
21:05 CET (UTC+1)	Payet 43'; Vainqueur (yellow card) 60'; Cabella 84', 110'; Dória (yellow card) 114'	Report	Pelé 19' (o.g.); Mbappé 66'; Mendy 104'; Lemar 113'; Fabinho (yellow card) 119'	Stadium: Stade Vélodrome; Attendance: 35,513; Referee: Benoît Millet

4 April 2017 Quarter-finals	Monaco	2–1	Lille	Monaco
21:00 CEST (UTC+2)	Germain 35', 45'; Dirar (yellow card) 54'; Jorge (yellow card) 58'	Report	Soumaoro (yellow card) 23'; Arcus (red card) 40'; Amadou (yellow card) 51'; El Ghazi 90+3'	Stadium: Stade Louis II; Attendance: 5,709; Referee: Tony Chapron

26 April 2017 Semi-finals	Paris Saint-Germain	5–0	Monaco	Paris
21:05 CEST (UTC+2)	Draxler 26'; Cavani 31'; Mbaé 50' (o.g.); Matuidi 52'; Marquinhos 90'	Report	Diallo (yellow card) 84'	Stadium: Parc des Princes; Attendance: 47,298; Referee: Clément Turpin

=== Coupe de la Ligue ===
14 December 2016 Round of 16	Monaco	7–0	Rennes	Monaco
21:05 CET (UTC+1)	Mbappé 11', 21', 62'; Boschilia 35', 79'; Jean 83'; Cavaré 84' (o.g.)	Report		Stadium: Stade Louis II; Attendance: 5,539; Referee: Frank Schneider

10 January 2017 Quarter-finals	Sochaux	1–1 (3–4 p)	Monaco	Montbéliard
21:00 CET (UTC+1)	Andriatsima 16'; Konaté (yellow card) 55'; Alphonse (yellow card) 58'	Report	Jean (yellow card) 6'; Glik (yellow card) 64'; Moutinho 83'	Stadium: Stade Auguste Bonal; Attendance: 15,362; Referee: Mikael Lesage
	Penalties
	Andriatsima (penalty scored); Robinet (penalty scored); Ilaimaharitra (penalty missed); Ramaré (penalty scored); Sao (penalty missed)		(penalty scored) Falcao; (penalty scored) Moutinho; (penalty scored) Glik; (penalty scored) Sidibé; (penalty missed) Carrillo

24 January 2017 Semi-finals	Monaco	1–0	Nancy	Monaco
21:00 CET (UTC+1)	Falcao 45+2'; Moutinho (yellow card) 62'; Lemar (yellow card) 85'	Report	Badila (yellow card) 41'; Muratori (yellow card) 45'; Robic (yellow card) 82'	Stadium: Stade Louis II; Attendance: 7,699; Referee: Ruddy Buquet

1 April 2017 Final	Monaco	1–4	Paris Saint-Germain	Décines-Charpieu
21:00 CEST (UTC+2)	Lemar 27'; Mendy (yellow card) 62'	Report	Draxler 4'; Di María 44'; Cavani 54', 90'; Kurzawa (yellow card) 56'; Trapp (yellow card) 66'	Stadium: Parc Olympique Lyonnais; Attendance: 57,841; Referee: Frank Schneider

=== UEFA Champions League ===
==== Third qualifying round ====
27 July 2016 First leg	Fenerbahçe (Turkey)	2–1	(France) Monaco	Istanbul, Turkey
20:30 CEST (UTC+2)	Souza (yellow card) 17'; Emenike 39', 61'; Fernandão (yellow card) 54'	Report	Falcao 42', (yellow card) 66'	Stadium: Şükrü Saracoğlu Stadium; Attendance: 12,223; Referee: Jesús Gil Manzano (Spain)

3 August 2016 Second leg	Monaco (France)	3–1 (4–3 agg.)	(Turkey) Fenerbahçe	Monaco
20:45 CEST (UTC+2)	Germain 2', 65'; Falcao 18' (pen.); Subašić (yellow card) 54'; Raggi (yellow card) 84'	Report	Kaldırım (yellow card) 17'; Emenike 53'	Stadium: Stade Louis II; Attendance: 8,403; Referee: Artur Soares Dias (Portugal)

==== Play-off round ====
17 August 2016 First leg	Villarreal (Spain)	1–2	(France) Monaco	Villarreal, Spain
20:45 CEST (UTC+2)	N'Diaye (yellow card) 3'; Pato 36'	Report	Fabinho 3' (pen.), (yellow card) 74'; Lemar (yellow card) 6'; Silva 72'; Mendy (yellow card) 86' (yellow-red card) 86'; Moutinho (yellow card) 90'	Stadium: El Madrigal; Attendance: 19,516; Referee: Felix Brych (Germany)

23 August 2016 Second leg	Monaco (France)	1–0 (3–1 agg.)	(Spain) Villarreal	Monaco
20:45 CEST (UTC+2)	Sidibé (yellow card) 25'; Fabinho 90+1' (pen.)	Report	Musacchio (yellow card) 83'	Stadium: Stade Louis II; Attendance: 8,750; Referee: Jonas Eriksson (Sweden)

==== Group stage ====
Pos	Team	Pld	W	D	L	GF	GA	GD	Pts	Qualification
1	(France) Monaco	6	3	2	1	9	7	+2	11	Advance to knockout phase
2	(Germany) Bayer Leverkusen	6	2	4	0	8	4	+4	10	Advance to knockout phase
3	(England) Tottenham Hotspur	6	2	1	3	6	6	0	7	Transfer to Europa League
4	(Russia) CSKA Moscow	6	0	3	3	5	11	−6	3	

Source: UEFA
Rules for classification: Group stage tiebreakers

14 September 2016 1	Tottenham Hotspur (England)	1–2	(France) Monaco	London, England
19:45 BST (UTC+1)	Kane (yellow card) 35'; Alderweireld 45'	Report	Silva 15'; Lemar 31'; Glik (yellow card) 50'; Fabinho (yellow card) 55'	Stadium: Wembley Stadium; Attendance: 85,011; Referee: Gianluca Rocchi (Italy)

27 September 2016 2	Monaco (France)	1–1	(Germany) Bayer Leverkusen	Monaco
20:45 CEST (UTC+2)	Jemerson (yellow card) 50'; Glik 90+4'	Report	Tah (yellow card) 19'; Toprak (yellow card) 50'; Hernández 74'	Stadium: Stade Louis II; Attendance: 8,100; Referee: David Fernández Borbalán (Spain)

18 October 2016 3	CSKA Moscow (Russia)	1–1	(France) Monaco	Moscow, Russia
20:45 CEST (UTC+2)	Traoré 34'; Natcho (yellow card) 74'	Report	Bakayoko (yellow card) 37'; Silva 87'; Sidibé (yellow card) 90'	Stadium: Arena CSKA; Attendance: 24,125; Referee: Martin Strömbergsson (Sweden)

2 November 2016 4	Monaco (France)	3–0	(Russia) CSKA Moscow	Monaco
20:45 CET (UTC+1)	Germain 13'; Jemerson (yellow card) 24'; Falcao 29', 41'	Report	Golovin (yellow card) 90+2'	Stadium: Stade Louis II; Attendance: 10,029; Referee: Matej Jug (Slovenia)

22 November 2016 5	Monaco (France)	2–1	(England) Tottenham Hotspur	Monaco
20:45 CET (UTC+1)	Falcao (penalty missed) 11', (yellow card) 57'; Sidibé 48'; Glik (yellow card) 51'; Lemar 53'	Report	Dier (yellow card) 11'; Dembélé (yellow card) 21'; Kane 52' (pen.); Trippier (yellow card) 85'	Stadium: Stade Louis II; Attendance: 13,100; Referee: Björn Kuipers (Netherlands)

7 December 2016 6	Bayer Leverkusen (Germany)	3–0	(France) Monaco	Leverkusen, Germany
20:45 CET (UTC+1)	Yurchenko 30'; Brandt 48'; Wendell (penalty missed) 82'; De Sanctis 82' (o.g.); Dragović (yellow card) 88'	Report	Jemerson (yellow card) 24'; Boschilia (yellow card) 41'; Germain (yellow card) 88'	Stadium: BayArena; Attendance: 21,928; Referee: Gediminas Mažeika (Lithuania)

==== Knockout phase ====
===== Round of 16 =====
21 February 2017 First leg	Manchester City (England)	5–3	(France) Monaco	Manchester, England
19:45 GMT (UTC±0)	Sterling 26'; Agüero (yellow card) 35', (goal) 58', 71'; Fernandinho (yellow card) 40'; Otamendi (yellow card) 49'; Zabaleta (yellow card) 73'; Stones 77'; Sané 82'	Report	Glik (yellow card) 8'; Sidibé (yellow card) 25'; Falcao 32', 61', (penalty missed) 50', (yellow card) 67'; Mbappé 40'; Bakayoko (yellow card) 55'; Silva (yellow card) 76'; Fabinho (yellow card) 81'	Stadium: City of Manchester Stadium; Attendance: 53,351; Referee: Antonio Mateu Lahoz (Spain)

15 March 2017 Second leg	Monaco (France)	3–1 (6 (a) –6 agg.)	(England) Manchester City	Monaco
20:45 CET (UTC+1)	Mbappé 8'; Fabinho 29'; Bakayoko (yellow card) 59', (goal) 77'; Germain (yellow card) 89'; Lemar (yellow card) 90+2'	Report	Sagna (yellow card) 11'; De Bruyne (yellow card) 58'; Sané 71'; Sterling (yellow card) 74'	Stadium: Stade Louis II; Attendance: 15,700; Referee: Gianluca Rocchi (Italy)

===== Quarter-finals =====
12 April 2017 First leg	Borussia Dortmund (Germany)	2–3	(France) Monaco	Dortmund, Germany
18:45 CEST (UTC+2)	Papastathopoulos (yellow card) 16'; Ginter (yellow card) 40'; Dembélé 57'; Kagawa 84'	Report	Mbappé 19', 79'; Bender 35' (o.g.); Jemerson (yellow card) 46'; Lemar (yellow card) 58'; Dirar (yellow card) 69'; Fabinho (yellow card) 81'; Subašić (yellow card) 87'	Stadium: Westfalenstadion; Attendance: 65,849; Referee: Daniele Orsato (Italy)
Note: The match, originally scheduled for 11 April 2017, 20:45 CEST, was postponed to the following day due to explosions close to the Borussia Dortmund team bus.

19 April 2017 Second leg	Monaco (France)	3–1 (6–3 agg.)	(Germany) Borussia Dortmund	Monaco
20:50 CEST (UTC+2)	Mbappé 3'; Falcao 17'; Germain 81'	Report	Reus 48'	Stadium: Stade Louis II; Attendance: 17,135; Referee: Damir Skomina (Slovenia)
Note: The match, originally scheduled for 20:45 CEST, was delayed to 20:50 CEST due to late team arrival caused by heavy traffic.

===== Semi-finals =====
3 May 2017 First leg	Monaco (France)	0–2	(Italy) Juventus	Monaco
20:45 CEST (UTC+2)	Fabinho (yellow card) 37'	Report	Bonucci (yellow card) 21'; Higuaín 29', 59'; Marchisio (yellow card) 58'; Chiellini (yellow card) 69'	Stadium: Stade Louis II; Attendance: 16,762; Referee: Antonio Mateu Lahoz (Spain)

9 May 2017 Second leg	Juventus (Italy)	2–1 (4–1 agg.)	(France) Monaco	Turin, Italy
20:45 CEST (UTC+2)	Mandžukić 33', (yellow card) 90+1'; Dani Alves 44'; Bonucci (yellow card) 74'	Report	Falcao (yellow card) 40'; Mendy (yellow card) 51'; Mbappé 69'	Stadium: Juventus Stadium; Attendance: 40,244; Referee: Björn Kuipers (Netherlands)

== Statistics ==
=== Appearances and goals ===
No.	Pos	Nat	Player	Total		Ligue 1		Coupe de France		Coupe de la Ligue		Champions League	
No.	Pos	Nat	Player	Apps	Goals	Apps	Goals	Apps	Goals	Apps	Goals	Apps	Goals
Goalkeepers
1	GK	(Croatia) CRO	Danijel Subašić	54	0	36	0	0	0	4	0	14	0
16	GK	(Italy) ITA	Morgan De Sanctis	8	0	1	0	5	0	0	0	2	0
30	GK	(Senegal) SEN	Seydou Sy	1	0	1	0	0	0	0	0	0	0
40	GK	(France) FRA	Loïc Badiashile	2	0	0+1	0	0	0	0	0	0+1	0
Defenders
2	DF	(Brazil) BRA	Fabinho	56	12	33+4	9	2+2	0	0+1	0	13+1	3
5	DF	(Brazil) BRA	Jemerson	54	2	34	2	2	0	3	0	15	0
6	DF	(Brazil) BRA	Jorge	5	1	1+1	1	3	0	0	0	0	0
19	DF	(France) FRA	Djibril Sidibé	47	3	26+3	2	1+1	0	3+1	0	12	1
23	DF	(France) FRA	Benjamin Mendy	39	1	24+1	0	2	1	1+1	0	9+1	0
24	DF	(Italy) ITA	Andrea Raggi	37	0	11+3	0	4+1	0	3	0	12+3	0
25	DF	(Poland) POL	Kamil Glik	53	8	36	6	1	1	3	0	12+1	1
34	DF	(France) FRA	Abdou Diallo	11	0	4+1	0	4	0	0+1	0	1	0
35	DF	(France) FRA	Kévin N'Doram	8	1	3+2	0	2	1	0	0	1	0
38	DF	(Mali) MLI	Almamy Touré	27	0	12+3	0	3	0	3+1	0	3+2	0
45	DF	(Ivory Coast) CIV	Kouadio-Yves Dabila	1	0	0	0	0+1	0	0	0	0	0
45	DF	(France) FRA	Pierre-Daniel N'Guinda	1	0	0	0	1	0	0	0	0	0
46	DF	(France) FRA	Safwan Mbaé	1	0	0	0	1	0	0	0	0	0
Midfielders
7	MF	(Morocco) MAR	Nabil Dirar	33	1	8+10	1	2	0	1+1	0	7+4	0
8	MF	(Portugal) POR	João Moutinho	52	3	19+12	2	4	0	4	1	7+6	0
10	MF	(Portugal) POR	Bernardo Silva	58	11	33+4	8	1+2	0	2+1	0	13+2	3
14	MF	(France) FRA	Tiémoué Bakayoko	51	3	25+7	2	1	0	4	0	14	1
26	MF	(Brazil) BRA	Gabriel Boschilia	16	8	5+6	6	2	0	1	2	1+1	0
27	MF	(France) FRA	Thomas Lemar	55	14	28+6	9	1+1	2	3	1	13+3	2
41	MF	(Republic of the Congo) CGO	Yhoan Andzouana	1	0	0	0	1	0	0	0	0	0
43	MF	(France) FRA	Dylan Beaulieu	1	0	0	0	1	0	0	0	0	0
44	MF	(Belgium) BEL	Adrien Bongiovanni	1	0	0	0	0+1	0	0	0	0	0
47	MF	(France) FRA	Tristan Muyumba	1	0	0	0	1	0	0	0	0	0
Forwards
9	FW	(Colombia) COL	Radamel Falcao	43	30	22+7	21	1+1	1	1+1	1	10	7
11	FW	(Argentina) ARG	Guido Carrillo	31	8	5+14	7	1+1	1	2	0	1+7	0
18	FW	(France) FRA	Valère Germain	60	17	28+8	10	3+2	3	2+1	0	9+7	4
29	FW	(France) FRA	Kylian Mbappé	44	26	17+12	15	3	2	3	3	6+3	6
33	FW	(France) FRA	Irvin Cardona	7	0	0+3	0	2+1	0	0+1	0	0	0
Players transferred out during the season
17	FW	(Portugal) POR	Ivan Cavaleiro	3	0	1+1	0	0	0	0	0	0+1	0
20	MF	(Mali) MLI	Adama Traoré	7	2	4+1	2	0	0	0+1	0	0+1	0
28	FW	(France) FRA	Corentin Jean	5	1	1+1	0	0	0	1+1	1	1	0
32	DF	(Democratic Republic of the Congo) COD	Marcel Tisserand	1	0	1	0	0	0	0	0	0	0

=== Goalscorers ===
Rank	Pos.	No.	Player	Ligue 1	Coupe de France	Coupe de la Ligue	Champions League	Total
1	FW	9	(Colombia) Radamel Falcao	21	1	1	7	30
2	FW	29	(France) Kylian Mbappé	15	2	3	6	26
3	FW	18	(France) Valère Germain	10	3	0	4	17
4	MF	27	(France) Thomas Lemar	9	2	1	2	14
5	DF	2	(Brazil) Fabinho	9	0	0	3	12
6	MF	10	(Portugal) Bernardo Silva	8	0	0	3	11
7	FW	11	(Argentina) Guido Carrillo	7	1	0	0	8
7	DF	25	(Poland) Kamil Glik	6	1	0	1	8
7	MF	26	(Brazil) Gabriel Boschilia	6	0	2	0	8
10	MF	8	(Portugal) João Moutinho	2	0	1	0	3
10	MF	14	(France) Tiémoué Bakayoko	2	0	0	1	3
10	DF	19	(France) Djibril Sidibé	2	0	0	1	3
13	DF	5	(Brazil) Jemerson	2	0	0	0	2
13	MF	20	(Mali) Adama Traoré	2	0	0	0	2
15	DF	6	(Brazil) Jorge	1	0	0	0	1
15	MF	7	(Morocco) Nabil Dirar	1	0	0	0	1
15	DF	23	(France) Benjamin Mendy	0	1	0	0	1
15	FW	28	(France) Corentin Jean	0	0	1	0	1
15	DF	35	(France) Kévin N'Doram	0	1	0	0	1
Own goals				4	1	1	1	7
Totals				107	13	10	29	159

=== Disciplinary record ===
N	P	Nat.	Name	Ligue 1			Coupe de France			Coupe de la Ligue			Champions League			Total			Notes
N	P	Nat.	Name	Yellow card	Second yellow card	Red card	Yellow card	Second yellow card	Red card	Yellow card	Second yellow card	Red card	Yellow card	Second yellow card	Red card	Yellow card	Second yellow card	Red card	Notes
1	GK	(Croatia)	Danijel Subašić	1									2			3			
2	MF	(Brazil)	Fabinho	8			1						5			14			
5	DF	(Brazil)	Jemerson	8	1								4			12	1		
6	DF	(Brazil)	Jorge				1									1			
7	DF	(Morocco)	Nabil Dirar	2			1						1			4			
8	MF	(Portugal)	João Moutinho							1			1			2			
9	FW	(Colombia)	Radamel Falcao	2									4			6			
10	FW	(Portugal)	Bernardo Silva	3									1			4			
14	MF	(France)	Tiémoué Bakayoko	2		1							3			5		1	
18	FW	(France)	Valère Germain										2			2			
19	DF	(France)	Djibril Sidibé	7			1						4	1		12	1		
20	DF	(Mali)	Adama Traoré	1												1			
23	DF	(France)	Benjamin Mendy	6		1				1			3	1		10	1	1	
24	DF	(Italy)	Andrea Raggi						1				1			1		1	
25	DF	(Poland)	Kamil Glik	6						1			3			10			
26	MF	(Brazil)	Gabriel Boschilia	1									2			3			
27	MF	(France)	Thomas Lemar	1						1			3			5			
28	FW	(France)	Corentin Jean	1						1						2			
29	FW	(France)	Kylian Mbappé	2												2			
32	DF	(Democratic Republic of the Congo)	Marcel Tisserand	1												1			
34	DF	(France)	Abdou Diallo				1									1			
35	DF	(France)	Kévin N'Doram				1									1			

Source: Match reports in Competitive matches
Ordered by (red card) , (second yellow card) and (yellow card)
(yellow card) = Number of bookings; (second yellow card) = Number of sending offs after a second yellow card; (red card) = Number of sending offs by a direct red card.

== Notes ==
1. Tottenham Hotspur played their home matches at Wembley Stadium, London instead of their regular stadium, White Hart Lane, London.
