= List of Coupe de la Ligue finals =

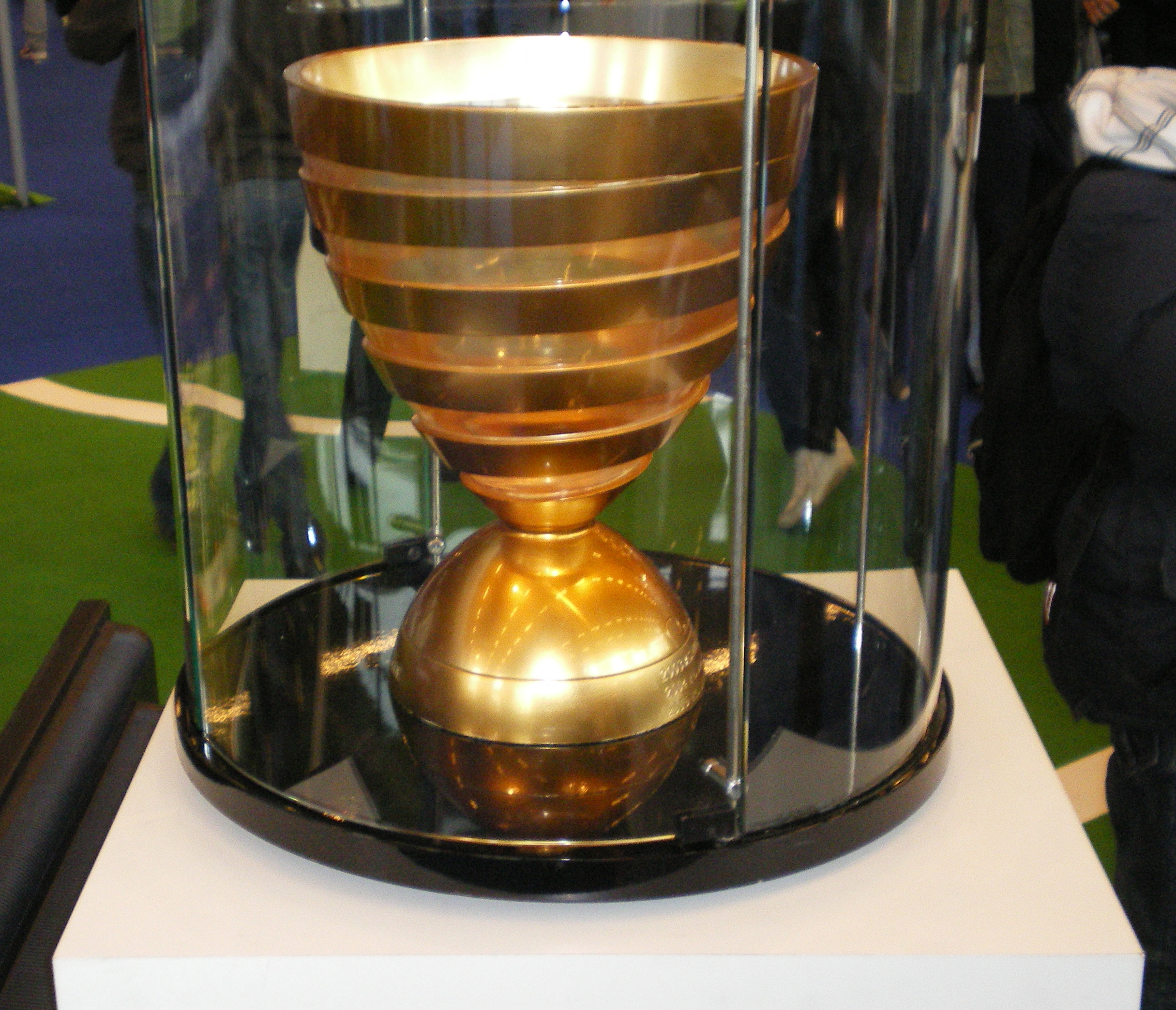
The Coupe de la Ligue trophy

The Coupe de la Ligue was a knockout cup competition in French football organised by the Ligue de Football Professionnel and comprises clubs of France's top football division, Ligue 1, France's second division, Ligue 2, and the third division, the Championnat National. The current competition was established relatively late in 1994 but another competition named Coupe de la Ligue existed from 1963 to 1965 and in 1982, a Coupe d'Été (later also called Coupe de la Ligue) was held before the start of the French league season. It was abolished after the 2019–20 season to reduce fixture congestion.

The most successful club in the history of the modern Coupe de la Ligue was Paris Saint-Germain, who won the cup nine times. Paris Saint-Germain also made the most appearances in the final, with ten. The venue for the final was the Parc des Princes for its first three years, until it was moved to the Stade de France. In September 2016, the LFP voted for the next three finals to be at Parc Olympique Lyonnais in Lyon, the Nouveau Stade de Bordeaux in Bordeaux, and the Stade Pierre-Mauroy in Lille, respectively. In 2000, Gueugnon became the first team outside the top French league to win the tournament.

== Previous formats (since 1963–1994) ==
=== Coupe de la Ligue (1963–1965) ===
Final	Winner	Score	Runners-up	Venue	Attendance
1964	Strasbourg	2–0	Rouen	Stade de la Meinau	7,494
1965	Nantes	4–1	Toulon	Parc des Princes	4,249

=== Coupe d'Été (1982) ===
Final	Winner	Score	Runners-up	Venue	Attendance
1982	Laval	3–1	Nancy	Stade de Paris	1,041

=== Coupe de la Ligue (1984–1994) ===
Final	Winner	Score	Runners-up	Venue	Attendance
1984	Laval	3–1	Monaco	Stade Auguste Delaune	5,000
1986	Metz	2–1	Cannes	Stade Pierre de Coubertin	7,000
1991	Reims	0–0 *^{[A]}	Niort	Stade René Gaillard	1,724
1992	Montpellier	3–1	Angers	Stade Jean-Bouin	4,882
1994	Lens	3–2	Montpellier	Stade Félix Bollaert	6,000

== Finals (since 1995) ==
Final	Winner	Score	Runners-up	Venue	Attendance
1995	Paris Saint-Germain	2–0	Bastia	Parc des Princes	24,663
1996	Metz	0–0 *^{[B]}	Lyon	Parc des Princes	45,368
1997	Strasbourg	0–0 *^{[C]}	Bordeaux	Parc des Princes	39,878
1998	Paris Saint-Germain	2–2 *^{[D]}	Bordeaux	Stade de France	77,700
1999	Lens	1–0	Metz	Stade de France	78,180
2000	Gueugnon	2–0	Paris Saint-Germain	Stade de France	75,400
2001	Lyon	2–1 †	Monaco	Stade de France	78,000
2002	Bordeaux	3–0	Lorient	Stade de France	75,923
2003	Monaco	4–1	Sochaux	Stade de France	75,379
2004	Sochaux	1–1 *^{[E]}	Nantes	Stade de France	78,409
2005	Strasbourg	2–1	Caen	Stade de France	78,732
2006	Nancy	2–1	Nice	Stade de France	76,830
2007	Bordeaux	1–0	Lyon	Stade de France	79,072
2008	Paris Saint-Germain	2–1	Lens	Stade de France	78,741
2009	Bordeaux	4–0	Vannes	Stade de France	75,822
2010	Marseille	3–1	Bordeaux	Stade de France	72,749
2011	Marseille	1–0	Montpellier	Stade de France	78,511
2012	Marseille	1–0 †	Lyon	Stade de France	78,877
2013	Saint-Étienne	1–0	Rennes	Stade de France	79,087
2014	Paris Saint-Germain	2–1	Lyon	Stade de France	78,489
2015	Paris Saint-Germain	4–0	Bastia	Stade de France	72,000
2016	Paris Saint-Germain	2–1	Lille	Stade de France	68,640
2017	Paris Saint-Germain	4–1	Monaco	Parc Olympique Lyonnais	57,841
2018	Paris Saint-Germain	3–0	Monaco	Nouveau Stade de Bordeaux	41,248
2019	Strasbourg	0–0 *^{[F]}	Guingamp	Stade Pierre-Mauroy	49,161
2020	Paris Saint-Germain	0–0 *^{[G]}	Lyon	Stade de France	3,500 (Note: The final was played in front of 3,500 spectators due to the COVID-19 pandemic in France.)

Key

†	Match went to extra time
*	Match decided by a penalty shoot-out after extra time

== Performance by team ==
The statistics includes all predecessors (marked in italics).

Team	Winners	Runners-up	Years won	Years runner-up
Paris Saint-Germain	9	1	1995, 1998, 2008, 2014, 2015, 2016, 2017, 2018, 2020	2000
Strasbourg	4	0	1964, 1997, 2005, 2019	—
Bordeaux	3	3	2002, 2007, 2009	1997, 1998, 2010
Marseille	3	0	2010, 2011, 2012	—
Metz	2	1	1986, 1996	1999
Lens	2	1	1994, 1999	2008
Laval	2	0	1982, 1984	—
Lyon	1	5	2001	1996, 2007, 2012, 2014, 2020
Monaco	1	4	2003	1984, 2001, 2017, 2018
Montpellier	1	2	1992	1994, 2011
Nantes	1	1	1965	2004
Sochaux	1	1	2004	2003
Nancy	1	1	2006	1982
Reims	1	0	1991	—
Gueugnon	1	0	2000	—
Saint-Étienne	1	0	2013	—
Bastia	0	2	—	1995, 2015
Rouen	0	1	—	1964
Toulon	0	1	—	1965
Cannes	0	1	—	1986
Niort	0	1	—	1991
Angers	0	1	—	1992
Lorient	0	1	—	2002
Caen	0	1	—	2005
Nice	0	1	—	2006
Vannes	0	1	—	2009
Rennes	0	1	—	2013
Lille	0	1	—	2016
Guingamp	0	1	—	2019

== Notes ==
A. : Reims won the 1991 final 4–3 in a penalty shoot-out.
B. : Metz won the 1996 final 5–4 in a penalty shoot-out.
C. : Strasbourg won the 1997 final 6–5 in a penalty shoot-out.
D. : Paris Saint-Germain won the 1998 final 4–2 in a penalty shoot-out.
E. : Sochaux won the 2004 final 5–4 in a penalty shoot-out.
F. : Strasbourg won the 2019 final 4–1 in a penalty shoot-out.
G. : Paris Saint-Germain won the 2020 final 6–5 in a penalty shoot-out.
