= Safwan Mbaé =

French-Comorian footballer (born 1997)

Personal information
- Full name: Safwan Mbaé
- Date of birth: 20 April 1997 (age 29)
- Place of birth: Paris, France
- Height: 1.83 m (6 ft 0 in)
- Position: Centre-back

Team information
- Current team: Bourgoin-Jallieu

Youth career
- 2013–2017: Monaco

Senior career*
Years	Team	Apps	(Gls)
2016–2018	Monaco B	44	(3)
2017	Monaco	0	(0)
2018	Teruel	2	(0)
2019	Villanueva	9	(0)
2019–2020	Monaco B	20	(0)
2020–2021	GOAL FC	5	(0)
2021–2022	Saint-Malo	8	(0)
2022–2023	Sète	14	(1)
2023–2024	Châtellerault	26	(4)
2024–	Bourgoin-Jallieu	0	(0)

International career^{‡}
2021–	Comoros	1	(0)
- * Club domestic league appearances and goals as of 19:17, 14 July 2024 (UTC) ‡ National team caps and goals as of 20:51, 22 April 2022 (UTC)

Safwan Mbaé (born 20 April 1997) is a professional footballer who plays as a centre-back for Championnat National 3 club Bourgoin-Jallieu. Born in France, he plays for the Comoros national team.

== Club career ==
Mbaé made his professional debut on 26 April 2017 in the Coupe de France semi-final against Paris Saint-Germain. He started the game and played the whole match in a 5–0 away loss, during which he scored an own goal in the 51st minute.

In September 2020, Mbaé signed for GOAL FC on a free transfer. After spells at Saint-Malo, FC Sète 34 and SO Châtellerault, Mbaé joined newly relegated Championnat National 3 club FC Bourgoin-Jallieu ahead of the 2024-25 season.

== International career ==
Born in France, Mbaé is of Comorian descent and also holds Comorian nationality. Mbaé was called up by the Comoros on 23 August 2019. He made his international debut on 1 September 2021 during a 7–1 friendly win over the Seychelles, the biggest win in the history of the Comoros national team.

== Career statistics ==
As of match played 29 January 2022

Appearances and goals by club, season and competition
Club	Season	League			Cup		Other		Total	
Club	Season	Division	Apps	Goals	Apps	Goals	Apps	Goals	Apps	Goals
Monaco B	2016–17	CFA	21	0	—		—		21	0
Monaco B	2017–18	National 2	23	3	—		—		23	3
Monaco B	Total		44	3	—		—		44	3
Monaco	2016–17	Ligue 1	0	0	1	0	0	0	1	0
Teruel	2018–19	Segunda División B	2	0	0	0	—		2	0
Villanueva	2018–19	Tercera División	9	0	0	0	—		9	0
Monaco B	2019–20	National 2	20	0	—		—		20	0
GOAL FC	2020–21	National 2	2	0	0	0	—		2	0
GOAL FC	2021–22	National 2	3	0	0	0	—		3	0
GOAL FC	Total		5	0	0	0	—		5	0
Saint-Malo	2021–22	National 2	8	0	2	0	—		10	0
Sète	2022–23	National 2	14	1	0	0	—		14	1
Career total			102	4	3	0	0	0	105	4
