= Thomas Lemar =

French footballer (born 1995)

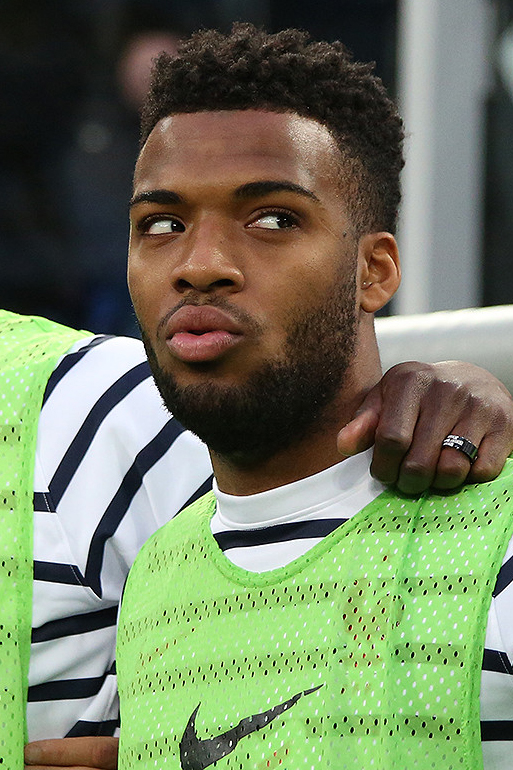
- Lemar with France in 2018

Personal information
- Full name: Thomas Benoît Lemar
- Date of birth: 12 November 1995 (age 31)
- Place of birth: Baie-Mahault, Guadeloupe, France
- Height: 1.71 m (5 ft 7 in)
- Positions: Midfielder; winger

Team information
- Current team: Elche (on loan from Atlético Madrid)
- Number: 18

Youth career
- 2003–2010: Solidarité Scolaire
- 2010–2013: Caen

Senior career*
Years	Team	Apps	(Gls)
2011–2015	Caen II	55	(4)
2013–2015	Caen	32	(1)
2015–2018	Monaco	90	(16)
2018–	Atlético Madrid	139	(8)
2025–2026	→ Girona (loan)	27	(3)
2026–	→ Elche (loan)	8	(1)

International career
2011–2012	France U17	13	(2)
2012–2013	France U18	6	(1)
2013	France U19	8	(1)
2014–2015	France U20	9	(1)
2015–2016	France U21	9	(1)
2016–2021	France	27	(4)
Medal record
Men's football
Representing France
FIFA World Cup
Winner	2018 Russia
- * Club domestic league appearances and goals as of 18:00, 1 November 2026 (UTC)

Thomas Benoît Lemar (born 12 November 1995) is a French professional footballer who plays as a midfielder for La Liga club Elche, on loan from Atlético Madrid. He is known for his versatility, being able to play on both wings and through the centre.

Lemar began his senior career at Caen in 2013. He played 32 times for the club, before moving to Monaco for £3.4 million in 2015, where he would win the 2016–17 Ligue 1 title. In 2018, he signed for La Liga club Atlético Madrid, winning the UEFA Super Cup in his debut season.

Lemar represented France at every level from under-17 to under-21, and made his senior international debut in 2016 against the Ivory Coast. He was a member of the team that won the 2018 FIFA World Cup, also featuring at UEFA Euro 2020.

== Club career ==
=== Caen ===
Thomas Lemar made his Ligue 2 debut in the opening game of the 2013–14 season on 2 August 2013, replacing Jérôme Rothen after 78 minutes in Caen's 3–1 home win over Dijon.

=== Monaco ===
==== 2015–16 season ====
On 1 July 2015, Lemar officially joined Monaco for an undisclosed fee. He scored his first goal for the club on 22 August 2015, scoring in a 1–1 draw with Toulouse. On 20 September, he scored in the club's 3–2 home loss to Lorient. Four days later, Lemar scored in Monaco's 3–2 win over Montpellier at the Stade de la Mosson. On 17 January 2016, Lemar scored in Monaco's 2–0 away win over Lorient. On 4 March, Lemar scored the opening goal in Monaco's 2–2 draw with his former club Caen.

==== 2016–17 season ====
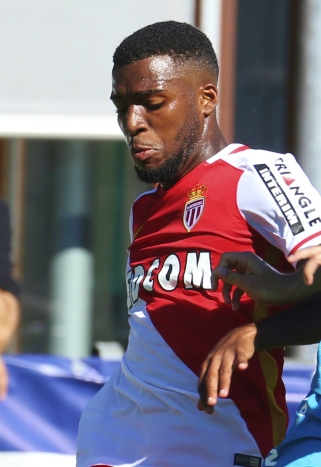
Lemar with Monaco in 2016

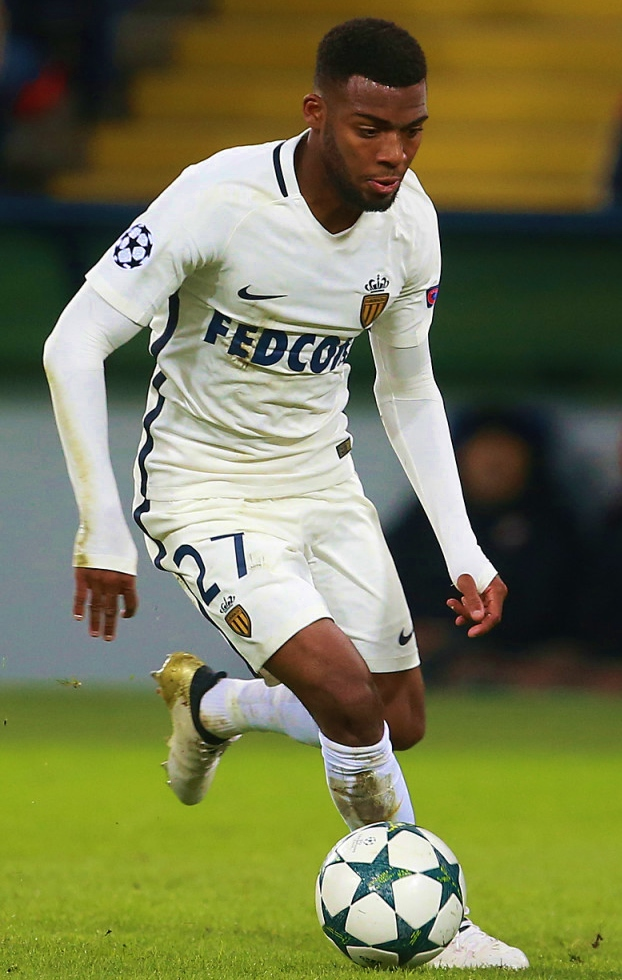
Lemar with Monaco in 2016

On 14 September 2016, Lemar scored his first goal of the season in Monaco's 2–1 away win over English club Tottenham Hotspur. Three days later, he scored twice in Monaco's 3–0 win over Rennes. On 1 October, he scored the opening goal in Monaco's 7–0 away win over Metz. On 21 October, he scored the fifth of six goals in Monaco's 6–2 win over Montpellier, and on 18 November, he scored in Monaco's 3–0 win over Lorient. On 22 November, Lemar scored the winning goal in Monaco's 2–1 win over Tottenham Hotspur, scoring in the 53rd minute with his goal coming one minute after Tottenham had equalized through Harry Kane in the 52nd minute.

On 15 January 2017, Lemar scored in Monaco's 4–1 win over Marseille, which moved Monaco to the top of the table. On 1 February, Lemar scored in Monaco's 5–4 win over Championnat National club Chambly. On 1 March, Lemar scored the winning goal in a 4–3 extra-time away win over Marseille in a 2016–17 Coupe de France round of 16 match. On 1 April, Lemar scored in the Coupe de la Ligue Final against Paris Saint-Germain, scoring the equalizer in the 27th minute, but Monaco eventually would lose the final 4–1. Lemar finished the season with 14 goals in all competitions.

==== 2017–18 season ====
In the 2017 summer transfer window, Lemar was linked to Premier League clubs Liverpool and Arsenal, though an agreement was never reached. On 29 June, Monaco rejected a £31 million bid from Arsenal, and in late August, Liverpool had a bid of £65 million rejected. On the final day of the transfer window, Arsenal made a final offer of €100 million, contingent on Alexis Sanchez moving to Manchester City for €65 million but the move collapsed as Lemar was informed on extremely short notice, just hours before a crucial World Cup qualification fixture against the Netherlands.

On 28 October 2017, Lemar scored his first goal of the season in Monaco's 2–0 win over Bordeaux. On 15 December, Lemar scored the second goal in Monaco's 4–0 win over Saint-Étienne. On 9 January 2018, Lemar scored in Monaco's 2–1 away win over Nice in the 2017–18 Coupe de la Ligue quarter-finals.

=== Atlético Madrid ===
On 18 June 2018, La Liga club Atlético Madrid confirmed that an agreement had been reached with Monaco for the transfer of Lemar. On 27 July, Lemar successfully passed his medical, joining for a reported fee of €70 million. On 22 September, Lemar scored his first league goal for Atletico against Getafe in a 2–0 away win, where he also hit the shot that resulted in an own goal for Getafe keeper David Soria. He ended the 2018–19 season with three goals in all competitions.

In the 2019–20 season, Lemar featured in 29 matches in all competitions, yet he finished the season with no goals and no assists. On 5 December 2020, Lemar scored his side's opening goal against Valladolid in a 2–0 win, ending a run of 45 matches at club level without scoring dating back to April 2019.

In the 2020–21 season, as manager Diego Simeone began experimenting with the 3–5–2 formation, Lemar surprisingly became a starter in the position of a left-sided central midfielder despite fierce competition from Saúl Ñíguez. During the 2021–22 season, he managed to score four goals in La Liga to achieve his personal best record at the club, in which two of them came in victories against Espanyol, and Barcelona.

On 18 March 2023, he scored a goal in a 3–0 win over Valencia, which was his only goal in the 2022–23 season. On 16 September 2023, he suffered from an Achilles tendon rupture in a 3–0 defeat against Valencia, which required surgery and would sideline him for several months.

==== Loan to Girona ====
On 31 July 2025, Lemar joined La Liga club Girona on a season-long loan deal.

==== Loan to Elche ====
On 1 September 2026, Lemar agreed to a one-year loan deal with Elche also in the Spanish top tier. He scored his 1st goal for the club coming off the bench against Real Sociedad on the 7th of September 2026.

== International career ==
Lemar was called up to the senior France squad to face Sweden and Ivory Coast in November 2016 after Kingsley Coman withdrew through injury. He made his debut on 15 November against the latter, replacing Adrien Rabiot for the final 12 minutes of a home friendly match that ended in 0–0 draw. His first international goals for the senior team came in a 2018 World Cup qualifying match against the Netherlands, scoring twice as France won 4–0.

On 17 May 2018, he was called up by manager Didier Deschamps to the 23-man French squad for the 2018 FIFA World Cup in Russia. He made his only appearance of the tournament in France's final group match against Denmark on 26 June, which ended in a 0–0 draw. On 15 July, France won the World Cup for the second time in their history after defeating Croatia 4–2 in the final of the tournament.

== Style of play ==
Lemar is a versatile midfielder able to play on both wings as well as through the centre and in a free role. He is predominantly left footed, but is also competent with his right foot. He is noted for his excellent dribbling skills, strong passing ability and free kicks. He has said he prefers to link-up with teammates, rather than taking on defenders: "I am trying to avoid duels and concentrate on passing as much as possible." He will often attempt to score from long range.

== Career statistics ==
=== Club ===
As of match played 1 November 2026

Appearances and goals by club, season and competition
Club	Season	League			National cup (Note: Includes Coupe de France, Copa del Rey)		League cup (Note: Includes Coupe de la Ligue)		Europe		Other		Total	
Club	Season	Division	Apps	Goals	Apps	Goals	Apps	Goals	Apps	Goals	Apps	Goals	Apps	Goals
Caen II	2011–12	CFA	11	0	—		—		—		—		11	0
Caen II	2012–13	CFA	22	0	—		—		—		—		22	0
Caen II	2013–14	CFA 2	15	3	—		—		—		—		15	3
Caen II	2014–15	CFA 2	7	1	—		—		—		—		7	1
Caen II	Total		55	4	—		—		—		—		55	4
Caen	2013–14	Ligue 2	7	0	1	0	2	0	—		—		10	0
Caen	2014–15	Ligue 1	25	1	0	0	1	0	—		—		26	1
Caen	Total		32	1	1	0	3	0	—		—		36	1
Monaco	2015–16	Ligue 1	26	5	2	0	1	0	5 (Note: One appearance in UEFA Champions League, four appearances in UEFA Europa League)	0	—		34	5
Monaco	2016–17	Ligue 1	34	9	2	2	3	1	16 (Note: Appearance(s) in UEFA Champions League)	2	—		55	14
Monaco	2017–18	Ligue 1	30	2	1	0	3	1	3	0	1 (Note: Appearance in Trophée des Champions)	0	38	3
Monaco	Total		90	16	5	2	7	2	24	2	1	0	127	22
Atlético Madrid	2018–19	La Liga	31	2	4	1	—		7	0	1 (Note: Appearance in UEFA Super Cup)	0	43	3
Atlético Madrid	2019–20	La Liga	22	0	0	0	—		7	0	0	0	29	0
Atlético Madrid	2020–21	La Liga	27	1	1	1	—		8	0	—		36	2
Atlético Madrid	2021–22	La Liga	24	4	2	0	—		8	0	1 (Note: Appearance in Supercopa de España)	0	35	4
Atlético Madrid	2022–23	La Liga	27	1	3	0	—		2	0	—		32	1
Atlético Madrid	2023–24	La Liga	3	0	0	0	—		0	0	0	0	3	0
Atlético Madrid	2024–25	La Liga	5	0	2	0	—		1	0	0	0	8	0
Atlético Madrid	Total		139	8	12	2	—		33	0	2	0	186	10
Girona (loan)	2025–26	La Liga	27	3	1	0	—		—		—		28	3
Elche (loan)	2026–27	La Liga	8	1	0	0	—		—		—		8	1
Career total			351	33	19	4	10	2	57	2	3	0	440	41

=== International ===
Appearances and goals by national team and year
National team	Year	Apps	Goals
France	2016	1	0
France	2017	7	2
France	2018	6	1
France	2019	8	1
France	2021	5	0
Total		27	4

France score listed first, score column indicates score after each Lemar goal.

List of international goals scored by Thomas Lemar
No.	Date	Venue	Cap	Opponent	Score	Result	Competition	Ref.
1	31 August 2017	Stade de France, Saint-Denis, France	6	Netherlands	2–0	4–0	2018 FIFA World Cup qualification	
2	31 August 2017	Stade de France, Saint-Denis, France	6	Netherlands	3–0	4–0	2018 FIFA World Cup qualification	
3	23 March 2018	Stade de France, Saint-Denis, France	9	Colombia	2–0	2–3	Friendly	
4	2 June 2019	Stade de la Beaujoire, Nantes, France	17	Bolivia	1–0	2–0	Friendly	

== Honours ==
Monaco

- Ligue 1: 2016–17

Atlético Madrid

- La Liga: 2020–21
- UEFA Super Cup: 2018

France

- FIFA World Cup: 2018

Individual

- UEFA Champions League Breakthrough XI: 2016
- UNFP Ligue 1 Player of the Month: November 2016

Orders

- Knight of the Legion of Honour: 2018
