= 2020–21 Atlético Madrid season =

114th season in existence of Atlético Madrid

Atlético Madrid
2020–21 season
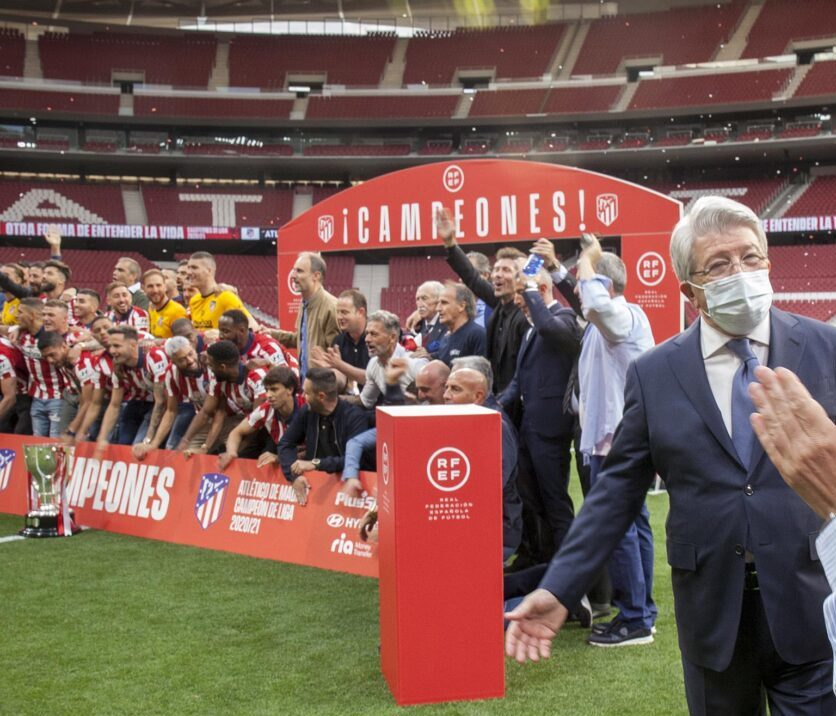
- Atlético Madrid players celebrate winning La Liga at the Wanda Metropolitano.
- President: Enrique Cerezo
- Head coach: Diego Simeone
- Stadium: Wanda Metropolitano
- La Liga: 1st
- Copa del Rey: Second round
- UEFA Champions League: Round of 16
- Top goalscorer: League: Luis Suárez (21); All: Luis Suárez (21)
- Biggest win: Atlético Madrid 6–1 Granada; Atlético Madrid 5–0 Eibar
- Biggest defeat: Bayern Munich 4–0 Atlético Madrid
Home colours	Away colours	Third colours

The 2020–21 season was the 114th season in the existence of Atlético Madrid and the club's 19th consecutive season in the top flight of Spanish football. In addition to the domestic league, Atlético Madrid participated in this season's editions of the UEFA Champions League and also participated in the Copa del Rey. The season covered the period from 14 August 2020 to 30 June 2021, with the late start to the season due to the COVID-19 pandemic in Spain.

== Kits ==
Home	Home alt.	Away	Away alt. 1	Away alt. 2	Third
Goalkeeper 1	Goalkeeper 2	Goalkeeper 3	Goalkeeper 4

== Players ==
Stats as of the end of the 2019–20 season.

N	Pos.	Nat.	Name	Age	EU	Since	App	Goals	Ends	Transfer fee	Notes
1	GK	(Croatia)	Ivo Grbić	30	EU	2020	0	0	2024	€3.5M	
2	DF	(Uruguay)	José Giménez (3rd captain)	31	EU	2013	191	8	2023	€0.9M	Second nationality: (Spain)
4	MF	(Central African Republic)	Geoffrey Kondogbia	33	EU	2020	0	0	2024	€10M	Second nationality: (France)
5	MF	(Uruguay)	Lucas Torreira	30	EU	2020	0	0	2021	Loan	Second nationality: (Spain)
6	MF	(Spain)	Koke (captain)	34	EU	2009	457	45	2024	Academy	
7	FW	(Portugal)	João Félix	27	EU	2019	36	9	2026	€126M	
8	MF	(Spain)	Saúl (4th captain)	31	EU	2012	296	41	2026	Academy	
9	FW	(Uruguay)	Luis Suárez	39	EU	2020	0	0	2022	Free	Second nationality: (Italy)
10	FW	(Argentina)	Ángel Correa	31	EU	2014	232	37	2024	€7.5M	Second nationality: (Spain)
11	MF	(France)	Thomas Lemar	30	EU	2018	72	4	2024	€70M	
12	DF	(Brazil)	Renan Lodi	28	Non-EU	2019	43	1	2026	€25M	
13	GK	(Slovenia)	Jan Oblak (vice-captain)	33	EU	2014	257	0	2023	€16M	
14	MF	(Spain)	Marcos Llorente	31	EU	2019	36	5	2024	€30M	
15	DF	(Montenegro)	Stefan Savić	35	Non-EU	2015	160	2	2023	€25M	
16	MF	(Mexico)	Héctor Herrera	36	EU	2019	30	1	2022	Free	Second nationality: (Portugal)
18	DF	(Brazil)	Felipe	37	Non-EU	2019	36	2	2022	€20M	
19	FW	(France)	Moussa Dembélé	30	EU	2021	0	0	2021	Loan	
20	MF	(Spain)	Vitolo	37	EU	2017	86	7	2022	€35M	
21	MF	(Belgium)	Yannick Carrasco	33	EU	2020	140	24	2024	€27M	
22	DF	(Spain)	Mario Hermoso	31	EU	2019	23	0	2025	€25M	
23	DF	(England)	Kieran Trippier	36	Non-EU	2019	33	0	2022	€20M	
24	DF	(Croatia)	Šime Vrsaljko	34	EU	2016	63	1	2022	€16M	

- Source: atleticodemadrid.com
- Ordered by squad number.

== Transfers ==
=== In ===
No.	Pos.	Nat.	Name	Age	EU	Moving from	Type	Transfer window	Ends	Transfer fee	Source
9	FW	(Spain)	Álvaro Morata	27	EU	(England) Chelsea	Transfer	Summer		€35M	
—	FW	(Croatia)	Nikola Kalinić	32	EU	(Italy) Roma	Loan return	Summer		Free	
—	MF	(Spain)	Víctor Mollejo	19	EU	Deportivo La Coruña	Loan return	Summer		Free	
—	DF	(Spain)	Javi Montero	21	EU	Deportivo La Coruña	Loan return	Summer		Free	
—	DF	(Argentina)	Nehuén Pérez	20	Non-EU	(Portugal) Famalicão	Loan return	Summer		Free	
1	GK	(Croatia)	Ivo Grbić	24	EU	(Croatia) Lokomotiva	Transfer	Summer		€3.5M	Atlético Madrid
21	MF	(Belgium)	Yannick Carrasco	26	EU	(China) Dalian Professional	Transfer	Summer		€27M	Atlético Madrid
9	FW	(Uruguay)	Luis Suárez	33	EU	Barcelona	Transfer	Summer		€7M	Atlético Madrid
5	MF	(Uruguay)	Lucas Torreira	24	EU	(England) Arsenal	Loan	Summer		Undisclosed	Atlético Madrid
4	MF	(Central African Republic)	Geoffrey Kondogbia	27	EU	Valencia	Transfer	Summer		Undisclosed	Atlético Madrid
19	FW	(France)	Moussa Dembélé	24	EU	(France) Lyon	Loan	Winter		€1.5M	Atlético Madrid

▼ Total Spending: €67M

=== Out ===
No.	Pos.	Nat.	Name	Age	EU	Moving to	Type	Transfer window	Transfer fee	Source
39	MF	(Spain)	Óscar Clemente	21	EU	Las Palmas	Transfer	Summer	Undisclosed	Atlético Madrid
1	GK	(Spain)	Antonio Adán	33	EU	(Portugal) Sporting CP	Transfer	Summer	Free	Sporting CP
37	GK	(Brazil)	Álex Dos Santos	21	EU	(Croatia) Lokomotiva	Loan	Summer	Free	Lokomotiva
—	MF	(Brazil)	Caio Henrique	23	Non-EU	(France) Monaco	Transfer	Summer	€8M	Atlético Madrid
40	FW	(Spain)	Darío Poveda	23	EU	Getafe	Loan	Summer	Undisclosed	Getafe
—	DF	(Spain)	Javi Montero	21	EU	(Turkey) Beşiktaş	Loan	Summer	Undisclosed	Beşiktaş
9	FW	(Spain)	Álvaro Morata	27	EU	(Italy) Juventus	Loan	Summer	€10M	Atlético Madrid
4	DF	(Colombia)	Santiago Arias	28	Non-EU	(Germany) Bayer Leverkusen	Loan	Summer	€12M	Atlético Madrid
—	FW	(Croatia)	Nikola Kalinić	32	EU	(Italy) Hellas Verona	Transfer	Summer	Undisclosed	Atlético Madrid
4	DF	(Argentina)	Nehuén Pérez	20	Non-EU	Granada	Loan	Summer	Free	Atlético Madrid
—	FW	(Spain)	Víctor Mollejo	19	EU	Getafe	Loan	Summer	Free	Atlético Madrid
5	MF	(Ghana)	Thomas Partey	27	Non-EU	(England) Arsenal	Transfer	Summer	€50M	Atlético Madrid
19	FW	(Spain)	Diego Costa	32	EU	Unattached	Transfer	Winter	Free	Atlético Madrid
3	DF	(Spain)	Manu Sánchez	20	EU	Osasuna	Loan	Winter	Free	Atlético Madrid
17	FW	(Serbia)	Ivan Šaponjić	23	EU	Cádiz	Loan	Winter	Free	Cádiz CF
35	MF	(Uruguay)	Juan Manuel Sanabria	20	Non-EU	Zaragoza	Loan	Winter	Free	Atlético Madrid

▲ Total Income: €80M

Net Income: ▲€13M

== Pre-season and friendlies ==
Win Draw Loss

19 September 2020 Friendly	Atlético Madrid	4–1	Almería	Madrid
CEST (UTC+2)	Morata; Costa; Mollejo; Šaponjić	Report	Maraš	Stadium: Wanda Metropolitano; Attendance: 0 (Note: The match was played behind closed doors due to the COVID-19 pandemic in Spain.)

== Competitions ==
=== Overall record ===
Competition	First match	Last match	Starting round	Final position	Record							
Competition	First match	Last match	Starting round	Final position	Pld	W	D	L	GF	GA	GD	Win %
La Liga	27 September 2020	22 May 2021	Matchday 1	Winners	38	26	8	4	67	25	+42	68.42
Copa del Rey	16 December 2020	6 January 2021	First round	Second round	2	1	0	1	3	1	+2	50.00
UEFA Champions League	21 October 2020	17 March 2021	Group stage	Round of 16	8	2	3	3	7	11	−4	25.00
Total					48	29	11	8	77	37	+40	60.42

Source: Soccerway

=== La Liga ===
==== League table ====
Pos	Team	Pld	W	D	L	GF	GA	GD	Pts	Qualification or relegation
1	Atlético Madrid (C)	38	26	8	4	67	25	+42	86	Qualification for the Champions League group stage
2	Real Madrid	38	25	9	4	67	28	+39	84	Qualification for the Champions League group stage
3	Barcelona	38	24	7	7	85	38	+47	79	Qualification for the Champions League group stage
4	Sevilla	38	24	5	9	53	33	+20	77	Qualification for the Champions League group stage
5	Real Sociedad	38	17	11	10	59	38	+21	62	Qualification for the Europa League group stage (Note: Since the winners of the 2020–21 Copa del Rey, Barcelona, qualified for the 2021–22 UEFA Champions League based on league position, the spot awarded to the cup winners (Europa League group stage) was passed to the sixth-placed team, and the spot awarded to the sixth-placed team (2021–22 UEFA Europa Conference League play-off round) was passed to the seventh-placed team, Villarreal.)

Source: La Liga
Rules for classification: 1) Points; 2) Head-to-head points; 3) Head-to-head goal difference; 4) Goal difference; 5) Goals scored; 6) Fair-play points (Note: Head-to-head record is used only after all the matches between the teams in question have been played)
(C) Champions

==== Results summary ====
Overall								Home						Away					
Pld	W	D	L	GF	GA	GD	Pts	W	D	L	GF	GA	GD	W	D	L	GF	GA	GD
38	26	8	4	67	25	+42	86	15	3	1	41	11	+30	11	5	3	26	14	+12

Source: La Liga

==== Results by round ====
Round	1	2	3	4	5	6	7	8	9	10	11	12	13	14	15	16	17	18	19	20	21	22	23	24	25	26	27	28	29	30	31	32	33	34	35	36	37	38
Ground	H	A	H	A	H	A	H	A	H	H	A	H	A	H	A	H	A	H	A	H	A	H	A	H	A	H	A	H	A	A	H	A	H	A	A	H	H	A
Result	W	D	W	D	D	W	W	W	W	W	W	W	L	W	W	W	W	W	W	W	W	D	W	L	W	D	D	W	L	D	W	L	W	W	D	W	W	W
Position	4	4	2	5	5	4	3	2	1	1	1	1	1	1	1	1	1	1	1	1	1	1	1	1	1	1	1	1	1	1	1	3	1	1	1	1	1	1

Source: La Liga
A = Away; H = Home; W = Win; D = Draw; L = Loss

==== Matches ====
The league fixtures were announced on 31 August 2020.

27 September 2020 3	Atlético Madrid	6–1	Granada	Madrid
16:00 CEST (UTC+2)	Costa 9'; Félix (yellow card) 27', (goal) 65'; Correa 47'; Saúl (penalty missed) 16', (yellow card) 59'; Llorente 73'; Partey (yellow card) 74'; Suárez 85', 90+3'	Report	Duarte (yellow card) 15'; Molina 87'	Stadium: Wanda Metropolitano; Attendance: 0 (Note: The match was played behind closed doors due to the COVID-19 pandemic in Spain.); Referee: Xavier Estrada Fernández

30 September 2020 4	Huesca	0–0	Atlético Madrid	Huesca
19:00 CEST (UTC+2)	Galán (yellow card) 80'	Report		Stadium: Estadio El Alcoraz; Attendance: 0 Referee: Adrián Cordero Vega

3 October 2020 5	Atlético Madrid	0–0	Villarreal	Madrid
16:00 CEST (UTC+2)	Lodi (yellow card) 56'	Report	Albiol (yellow card) 50'; Iborra (yellow card) 79'	Stadium: Wanda Metropolitano; Attendance: 0 Referee: Alejandro Hernández Hernández

17 October 2020 6	Celta Vigo	0–2	Atlético Madrid	Vigo
16:00 CEST (UTC+2)	Beltrán (yellow card) 41'; Nolito (yellow card) 63'; Aspas (yellow card) 83'	Report	Suárez 6'; Hermoso (yellow card) 17'; Costa (yellow card) 37'; Felipe (yellow card) 71'; Herrera (yellow card) 86'; Carrasco 90+5'	Stadium: Balaídos; Attendance: 0 Referee: Juan Martínez Munuera

24 October 2020 7	Atlético Madrid	2–0	Real Betis	Madrid
21:00 CEST (UTC+2)	Suárez (yellow card) 41', (goal) 90+1'; Llorente 46'; Koke (yellow card) 50'	Report	Montoya (red card) 72'	Stadium: Wanda Metropolitano; Attendance: 0 Referee: Antonio Mateu Lahoz

31 October 2020 8	Osasuna	1–3	Atlético Madrid	Pamplona
18:30 CET (UTC+1)	Herrera (yellow card) 42'; Budimir 80'	Report	Félix 43' (pen.), 69', (penalty missed) 48'; Koke (yellow card) 72'; Torreira 88'; Llorente (yellow card) 90+1'	Stadium: El Sadar Stadium; Attendance: 0 Referee: Xavier Estrada Fernández

7 November 2020 9	Atlético Madrid	4–0	Cádiz	Madrid
21:00 CET (UTC+1)	Félix 8', 90+1'; Llorente 22'; Suárez 51'; Kondogbia (yellow card) 85'	Report	Jønsson (yellow card) 57'	Stadium: Wanda Metropolitano; Attendance: 0 Referee: Adrián Cordero Vega

21 November 2020 10	Atlético Madrid	1–0	Barcelona	Madrid
21:00 CET (UTC+1)	Koke (yellow card) 9'; Carrasco (yellow card) 26', (goal) 45+3'; Savić (yellow card) 79'; Giménez (yellow card) 80'	Report		Stadium: Wanda Metropolitano; Attendance: 0 Referee: José Luis Munuera Montero

28 November 2020 11	Valencia	0–1	Atlético Madrid	Valencia
16:15 CET (UTC+1)	Račić (yellow card) 28'; Guillamón (yellow card) 57'	Report	Saúl (yellow card) 43'; Correa (yellow card) 62'; Llorente (yellow card) 76'; Lato 79' (o.g.); Félix (yellow card) 81'; Koke (yellow card) 83'	Stadium: Mestalla; Attendance: 0 Referee: Ricardo de Burgos Bengoetxea

5 December 2020 12	Atlético Madrid	2–0	Valladolid	Madrid
18:30 CET (UTC+1)	Savić (yellow card) 24'; Vitolo (yellow card) 40'; Suárez (yellow card) 49'; Lemar 56'; Llorente 72'; Herrera (yellow card) 85'	Report	Sánchez (yellow card) 51'; Mesa (yellow card) 81'	Stadium: Wanda Metropolitano; Attendance: 0 Referee: Pablo González Fuertes

12 December 2020 13	Real Madrid	2–0	Atlético Madrid	Madrid
21:00 CET (UTC+1)	Casemiro 15', (yellow card) 36'; Oblak 63' (o.g.)	Report	Lemar (yellow card) 46'; Correa (yellow card) 50'; Hermoso (yellow card) 65'	Stadium: Alfredo Di Stéfano; Attendance: 0 Referee: Antonio Mateu Lahoz

19 December 2020 14	Atlético Madrid	3–1	Elche	Madrid
14:00 CET (UTC+1)	Hermoso (yellow card) 40'; Suárez 41', 58'; Costa 80' (pen.)	Report	Gonzalo (yellow card) 14'; Boyé 64'; Marcone (yellow card) 79'	Stadium: Wanda Metropolitano; Attendance: 0 Referee: Xavier Estrada Fernández

22 December 2020 15	Real Sociedad	0–2	Atlético Madrid	San Sebastián
19:45 CET (UTC+1)	Le Normand (yellow card) 29'; Elustondo (yellow card) 80'; Isak (yellow card) 86'	Report	Savić (yellow card) 16'; Hermoso (yellow card) 29', (goal) 49'; Saúl (yellow card) 66'; Llorente 74'	Stadium: Anoeta; Attendance: 0 Referee: Guillermo Cuadra Fernández

30 December 2020 16	Atlético Madrid	1–0	Getafe	Madrid
19:15 CET (UTC+1)	Suárez 20'; Savić (yellow card) 26'; Giménez (yellow card) 84'	Report	Ángel (yellow card) 24'; Timor (yellow card) 75'; Etxeita (yellow card) 83'	Stadium: Wanda Metropolitano; Attendance: 0 Referee: Jesús Gil Manzano

3 January 2021 17	Alavés	1–2	Atlético Madrid	Vitoria-Gasteiz
16:15 CET (UTC+1)	Laguardia (red card) 63'; Felipe 84' (o.g.)	Report	Carrasco (yellow card) 29'; Llorente 41'; Suárez 90', (yellow card) 90+4'	Stadium: Mendizorrotza; Attendance: 0 Referee: Juan Martínez Munuera

12 January 2021 1	Atlético Madrid	2–0	Sevilla	Madrid
21:30 CET (UTC+1)	Correa 17'; Koke (yellow card) 48'; Savić (yellow card) 57'; Saúl 76'	Report		Stadium: Wanda Metropolitano; Attendance: 0 Referee: Xavier Estrada Fernández
Note: Match originally scheduled for 12 September 2020, but postponed due to the delayed conclusion of last season's UEFA club competitions.

21 January 2021 19	Eibar	1–2	Atlético Madrid	Eibar
21:30 CET (UTC+1)	Dmitrović 12' (pen.); Arbilla (yellow card) 83'; Kike (yellow card) 90+1'; Pozo (yellow card) 90+4'	Report	Suárez 40', 89' (pen.); Felipe (yellow card) 62'; Savić (yellow card) 90'	Stadium: Ipurua; Attendance: 0 Referee: Mario Melero López

24 January 2021 20	Atlético Madrid	3–1	Valencia	Madrid
21:00 CET (UTC+1)	Félix 23'; Vrsaljko (yellow card) 30'; Suárez 54'; Correa 72'; Savić (yellow card) 76'	Report	Račić 11'	Stadium: Wanda Metropolitano; Attendance: 0 Referee: Ricardo de Burgos Bengoetxea

31 January 2021 21	Cádiz	2–4	Atlético Madrid	Cádiz
16:15 CET (UTC+1)	Negredo 35', 71'; Jairo (yellow card) 40'	Report	Suárez 28', 50' (pen.); Torreira (yellow card) 38'; Félix (yellow card) 41'; Saúl 44'; Vrsaljko (yellow card) 73'; Koke (yellow card) 77', (goal) 88'; Kondogbia (yellow card) 85'	Stadium: Ramón de Carranza; Attendance: 0 Referee: Jesús Gil Manzano

8 February 2021 22	Atlético Madrid	2–2	Celta Vigo	Madrid
21:00 CET (UTC+1)	Felipe (yellow card) 23'; L. Suárez 45', 50'; Giménez (yellow card) 67'	Report	Tapia (yellow card) 5'; Mina 13'; D. Suárez (yellow card) 78'; Ferreyra 89'	Stadium: Wanda Metropolitano; Attendance: 0 Referee: Guillermo Cuadra Fernández

13 February 2021 23	Granada	1–2	Atlético Madrid	Granada
14:00 CET (UTC+1)	Herrera 66'	Report	Suárez (yellow card) 39'; Saúl (yellow card) 43'; Llorente 63'; Correa 74'; Savić (yellow card) 77'; Koke (yellow card) 89'; Carrasco (yellow card) 90+1'	Stadium: Nuevo Los Cármenes; Attendance: 0 Referee: Antonio Mateu Lahoz

17 February 2021 2	Levante	1–1	Atlético Madrid	Valencia
19:00 CET (UTC+1)	Bardhi 17'; De Frutos (yellow card) 45'	Report	Saúl (yellow card) 26'; Llorente 37'; Savić (yellow card) 42'; Kondogbia (yellow card) 51'	Stadium: Ciutat de València; Attendance: 0 Referee: José Luis Munuera Montero
Note: Match originally scheduled for 19 September 2020, but postponed due to the delayed conclusion of last season's UEFA club competitions.

20 February 2021 24	Atlético Madrid	0–2	Levante	Madrid
16:15 CET (UTC+1)	Lemar (yellow card) 70'; Koke (yellow card) 70'	Report	Hermoso 30' (o.g.); Vezo (yellow card) 36'; Cárdenas (yellow card) 69'; Róber (yellow card) 90+1'; De Frutos 90+5'	Stadium: Wanda Metropolitano; Attendance: 0 Referee: Mario Melero López

28 February 2021 25	Villarreal	0–2	Atlético Madrid	Villarreal
21:00 CET (UTC+1)	Costa (yellow card) 32'; Albiol (yellow card) 51'	Report	Pedraza 25' (o.g.); Felipe (yellow card) 35'; Lemar (yellow card) 45+5'; Saúl (yellow card) 47'; Félix 69'	Stadium: Estadio de la Cerámica; Attendance: 0 Referee: Ricardo de Burgos Bengoetxea

7 March 2021 26	Atlético Madrid	1–1	Real Madrid	Madrid
16:15 CET (UTC+1)	Suárez 15'; Carrasco (yellow card) 64'; Correa (yellow card) 72'; Félix (yellow card) 80'; Savić (yellow card) 90'; Llorente (yellow card) 90+2'	Report	Varane (yellow card) 67'; Benzema 88'	Stadium: Wanda Metropolitano; Attendance: 0 Referee: Alejandro Hernández Hernández

10 March 2021 18	Atlético Madrid	2–1	Athletic Bilbao	Madrid
19:00 CET (UTC+1)	Felipe (yellow card) 43'; Llorente 45+2'; Suárez 51' (pen.); Lodi (yellow card) 90+4'	Report	Muniain 21'; De Marcos (yellow card) 38'; Vesga (yellow card) 41'	Stadium: Wanda Metropolitano; Attendance: 0 Referee: Jesús Gil Manzano
Note: Match originally scheduled for 9 January 2021, but postponed due to the storm causing the closure of Madrid Barajas airport.

13 March 2021 27	Getafe	0–0	Atlético Madrid	Getafe
21:00 CET (UTC+1)	Nyom (red card) 70'; Soria (yellow card) 90+1'	Report	Giménez (yellow card) 45+1'; Savić (yellow card) 45+2'; Félix (yellow card) 77'; Llorente (yellow card) 83'; Hermoso (yellow card) 84'	Stadium: Coliseum Alfonso Pérez; Attendance: 0 Referee: José María Sánchez Martínez

21 March 2021 28	Atlético Madrid	1–0	Alavés	Madrid
18:30 CET (UTC+1)	Suárez 54'; Carrasco (yellow card) 76'; Savić (yellow card) 85'; Saúl (yellow card) 90+2'	Report	Jota (yellow card) 33'; Joselu (penalty missed) 86'; Battaglia (yellow card) 88'	Stadium: Wanda Metropolitano; Attendance: 0 Referee: Juan Martínez Munuera

4 April 2021 29	Sevilla	1–0	Atlético Madrid	Seville
21:00 CEST (UTC+2)	Ocampos (penalty missed) 8'; Diego Carlos (yellow card) 10'; Acuña (yellow card) 56', (goal) 70'	Report	Felipe (yellow card) 5'; Suárez (yellow card) 56'; Llorente (yellow card) 79'; Kondogbia (yellow card) 86'	Stadium: Ramón Sánchez Pizjuán; Attendance: 0 Referee: Jesús Gil Manzano

11 April 2021 30	Real Betis	1–1	Atlético Madrid	Seville
21:00 CEST (UTC+2)	Tello 20'	Report	Carrasco 5'	Stadium: Benito Villamarín; Attendance: 0 Referee: Guillermo Cuadra Fernández

18 April 2021 33	Atlético Madrid	5–0	Eibar	Madrid
16:15 CEST (UTC+2)	Correa 42', 44'; Carrasco 49'; Llorente 53', 68'	Report	Oliveira (yellow card) 88'	Stadium: Wanda Metropolitano; Attendance: 0 Referee: César Soto Grado
Note: The match was originally scheduled for 28 April 2021, but was brought forward by La Liga.

22 April 2021 31	Atlético Madrid	2–0	Huesca	Madrid
19:00 CEST (UTC+2)	Correa 39'; Giménez (yellow card) 65'; Carrasco 80'; Saúl (yellow card) 83'	Report		Stadium: Wanda Metropolitano; Attendance: 0 Referee: José Luis Munuera Montero

25 April 2021 32	Athletic Bilbao	2–1	Atlético Madrid	Bilbao
21:00 CEST (UTC+2)	Berenguer 8'; Sancet (yellow card) 44'; Vencedor (yellow card) 61'; D. García (yellow card) 66'; Martínez 86'; López (yellow card) 90+2'	Report	Llorente (yellow card) 11'; Savić 77'; Torreira (yellow card) 81'	Stadium: San Mamés; Attendance: 0 Referee: Pablo González Fuertes

1 May 2021 34	Elche	0–1	Atlético Madrid	Elche
16:15 CEST (UTC+2)	Milla (yellow card) 69'; Boyé (yellow card) 75'; Barragán (yellow card) 76'; Fidel (penalty missed) 90+1'	Report	Llorente 23'; Lemar (yellow card) 36'; Carrasco (yellow card) 41'	Stadium: Martínez Valero; Attendance: 0 Referee: Mario Melero López

8 May 2021 35	Barcelona	0–0	Atlético Madrid	Barcelona
16:15 CEST (UTC+2)	Moriba (yellow card) 58'; Alba (yellow card) 82'; Piqué (yellow card) 82'	Report	Saúl (yellow card) 35'; Felipe (yellow card) 46'; Koke (yellow card) 65'	Stadium: Camp Nou; Attendance: 0 Referee: Antonio Mateu Lahoz

12 May 2021 36	Atlético Madrid	2–1	Real Sociedad	Madrid
22:00 CEST (UTC+2)	Carrasco 16'; Correa 28'	Report	Zubeldia 83'	Stadium: Wanda Metropolitano; Attendance: 0 Referee: Guillermo Cuadra Fernández

16 May 2021 37	Atlético Madrid	2–1	Osasuna	Madrid
18:30 CEST (UTC+2)	Lodi 82'; Suárez 88', (yellow card) 89'	Report	Budimir 76', (yellow card) 76'; Brašanac (yellow card) 84'	Stadium: Wanda Metropolitano; Attendance: 0 Referee: Juan Martínez Munuera

22 May 2021 38	Valladolid	1–2	Atlético Madrid	Valladolid
18:00 CEST (UTC+2)	Plano 18'; Marcos André (yellow card) 55'; El Yamiq (yellow card) 70'; Míchel (yellow card) 74'; Fede (yellow card) 78'	Report	Correa 57'; Suárez 67'; Hermoso (yellow card) 68'; Vitolo (yellow card) 68'; Saúl (yellow card) 68'; Félix (yellow card) 78'; Felipe (yellow card) 83'; Lodi (yellow card) 87'	Stadium: José Zorrilla; Attendance: 0 Referee: José María Sánchez Martínez

=== Copa del Rey ===
16 December 2020 First round	Cardassar	0–3	Atlético Madrid	Sant Llorenç des Cardassar
19:00 CET (UTC+1)	Fernández (yellow card) 59'	Report	Lemar 24'; Saúl (yellow card) 37'; Ricard 42', (yellow card) 67'; Vrsaljko 83'	Stadium: Es Moleters; Referee: Jorge Figueroa Vázquez

6 January 2021 Second round	Cornellà	1–0	Atlético Madrid	Cornellà
18:00 CET (UTC+1)	Jiménez 7'; García (yellow card) 23'; Gila (yellow card) 65'; Moreno (yellow card) 90+5'	Report	Giménez (yellow card) 6'; Ricard (yellow card) 52' (yellow-red card) 63'	Stadium: Nou Camp Municipal; Referee: Guillermo Cuadra Fernández

=== UEFA Champions League ===
==== Group stage ====
The group stage draw was held on 1 October 2020.

Pos	Team	Pld	W	D	L	GF	GA	GD	Pts	Qualification	BAY	ATM	SAL	LMO
1	(Germany) Bayern Munich	6	5	1	0	18	5	+13	16	Advance to knockout phase	—	4–0	3–1	2–0
2	(Spain) Atlético Madrid	6	2	3	1	7	8	−1	9	Advance to knockout phase	1–1	—	3–2	0–0
3	(Austria) Red Bull Salzburg	6	1	1	4	10	17	−7	4	Transfer to Europa League	2–6	0–2	—	2–2
4	(Russia) Lokomotiv Moscow	6	0	3	3	5	10	−5	3		1–2	1–1	1–3	—

Source: UEFA
Rules for classification: Group stage tiebreakers

21 October 2020 1	Bayern Munich (Germany)	4–0	(Spain) Atlético Madrid	Munich, Germany
21:00 CEST (UTC+2)	Alaba (yellow card) 5'; Müller (yellow card) 21'; Coman 28', 72'; Goretzka 41'; Tolisso 66'	Report	Lodi (yellow card) 43'; Koke (yellow card) 44'; Herrera (yellow card) 45+1'; Torreira (yellow card) 90+2'	Stadium: Allianz Arena; Attendance: 0 (Note: Due to the COVID-19 pandemic in Europe, the match was played behind closed doors.); Referee: Michael Oliver (England)

27 October 2020 2	Atlético Madrid (Spain)	3–2	(Austria) Red Bull Salzburg	Madrid, Spain
21:00 CET (UTC+1)	Llorente 29', (yellow card) 64'; Félix 52', 85'	Report	Ramalho (yellow card) 13'; Wöber (yellow card) 23'; Szoboszlai 40'; Felipe 47' (o.g.)	Stadium: Wanda Metropolitano; Attendance: 0 Referee: Ovidiu Hațegan (Romania)

3 November 2020 3	Lokomotiv Moscow (Russia)	1–1	(Spain) Atlético Madrid	Moscow, Russia
18:55 CET (UTC+1)	An. Miranchuk 25' (pen.); Murilo (yellow card) 29'; Krychowiak (yellow card) 51'; Rajković (yellow card) 54'; Zhemaletdinov (yellow card) 70'; Ignatyev (yellow card) 83'	Report	Giménez 18'; Suárez (yellow card) 24'; Saúl (yellow card) 44'; Lodi (yellow card) 49'	Stadium: RZD Arena; Attendance: 8,147; Referee: Benoît Bastien (France)

25 November 2020 4	Atlético Madrid (Spain)	0–0	(Russia) Lokomotiv Moscow	Madrid, Spain
21:00 CET (UTC+1)		Report		Stadium: Wanda Metropolitano; Attendance: 0 Referee: Slavko Vinčić (Slovenia)

1 December 2020 5	Atlético Madrid (Spain)	1–1	(Germany) Bayern Munich	Madrid, Spain
21:00 CET (UTC+1)	Félix 26'; Savić (yellow card) 86'	Report	Sarr (yellow card) 43'; Müller 86' (pen.)	Stadium: Wanda Metropolitano; Attendance: 0 Referee: Clément Turpin (France)

9 December 2020 6	Red Bull Salzburg (Austria)	0–2	(Spain) Atlético Madrid	Wals-Siezenheim, Austria
21:00 CET (UTC+1)	Ramalho (yellow card) 71'	Report	Hermoso 39', (yellow card) 45+1'; Savić (yellow card) 61'; Carrasco 86'	Stadium: Stadion Wals-Siezenheim; Attendance: 0 Referee: Anthony Taylor (England)

==== Knockout phase ====
===== Round of 16 =====
The draw for the round of 16 was held on 14 December 2020.

23 February 2021 First leg	Atlético Madrid (Spain)	0–1	(England) Chelsea	Bucharest, Romania
21:00 CET (UTC+1)	Llorente (yellow card) 63'; Lemar (yellow card) 90+3'	Report	Mount (yellow card) 1'; Jorginho (yellow card) 64'; Giroud 68'	Stadium: Arena Națională; Attendance: 0 Referee: Felix Brych (Germany)
Note: The match, originally to be played at the Wanda Metropolitano in Madrid, was moved to Arena Națională in Bucharest, due to restrictions related to the COVID-19 pandemic imposed by Spain on travelers from the United Kingdom out of concern of the variant B.1.1.7.

17 March 2021 Second leg	Chelsea (England)	2–0 (3–0 agg.)	(Spain) Atlético Madrid	London, England
21:00 CET (UTC+1)	Havertz (yellow card) 30'; Ziyech 34'; Emerson 90+4'	Report	Lodi (yellow card) 31'; Saúl (yellow card) 51'; Giménez (yellow card) 60'; Koke (yellow card) 72'; Savić (red card) 82'	Stadium: Stamford Bridge; Attendance: 0 Referee: Daniele Orsato (Italy)

== Statistics ==
=== Squad statistics ===
No.	Pos.	Nat.	Player	Total		La Liga		Copa del Rey		Champions League	
No.	Pos.	Nat.	Player	Apps	Goals	Apps	Goals	Apps	Goals	Apps	Goals
1	GK	(Croatia)	Ivo Grbić	1	0	0	0	1	0	0	0
2	DF	(Uruguay)	José Giménez	26	1	21	0	1	0	4	1
3	DF	(Spain)	Manu Sánchez^{2}	1	0	1	0	0	0	0	0
4	MF	(Central African Republic)	Geoffrey Kondogbia	27	0	25	0	2	0	0	0
5	MF	(Ghana)	Thomas Partey^{2}	3	0	3	0	0	0	0	0
5	MF	(Uruguay)	Lucas Torreira	26	1	19	1	2	0	5	0
6	MF	(Spain)	Koke	45	1	37	1	0	0	8	0
7	FW	(Portugal)	João Félix	40	10	31	7	1	0	8	3
8	MF	(Spain)	Saúl	41	2	33	2	2	0	6	0
9	FW	(Uruguay)	Luis Suárez	38	21	32	21	0	0	6	0
10	FW	(Argentina)	Ángel Correa	48	9	38	9	2	0	8	0
11	MF	(France)	Thomas Lemar	36	2	27	1	1	1	8	0
12	DF	(Brazil)	Renan Lodi	33	1	23	1	2	0	8	0
13	GK	(Slovenia)	Jan Oblak	46	0	38	0	0	0	8	0
14	MF	(Spain)	Marcos Llorente	45	13	37	12	0	0	8	1
15	DF	(Montenegro)	Stefan Savić	42	1	33	1	0	0	8	0
16	MF	(Mexico)	Héctor Herrera	21	0	16	0	0	0	5	0
17	FW	(Serbia)	Ivan Šaponjić^{2}	2	0	0	0	2	0	0	0
18	DF	(Brazil)	Felipe	38	0	31	0	2	0	5	0
19	FW	(Spain)	Diego Costa^{2}	7	2	7	2	0	0	0	0
19	FW	(France)	Moussa Dembélé	7	0	5	0	0	0	2	0
20	MF	(Spain)	Vitolo	15	0	10	0	2	0	3	0
21	MF	(Belgium)	Yannick Carrasco	35	7	30	6	0	0	5	1
22	DF	(Spain)	Mario Hermoso	38	2	31	1	1	0	6	1
23	DF	(England)	Kieran Trippier	35	0	28	0	0	0	7	0
24	DF	(Croatia)	Šime Vrsaljko	10	1	9	0	1	1	0	0
27	FW	(Spain)	Sergio Camello^{1}	2	0	0	0	1	0	1	0
29	DF	(Spain)	Ricard Sánchez^{1}	3	1	1	0	2	1	0	0
31	GK	(Spain)	Miguel San Román^{1}	1	0	0	0	1	0	0	0
35	MF	(Uruguay)	Juan Manuel Sanabria^{1}	1	0	0	0	1	0	0	0

^{1}Player from reserve team (Atlético Madrid B).
^{2}Player left the club during the season.

=== Goalscorers ===
Rank	No.	Pos.	Name	La Liga	Copa del Rey	Champions League	Total
1	9	FW	(Uruguay) Luis Suárez	21	0	0	21
2	14	MF	(Spain) Marcos Llorente	12	0	1	13
3	7	FW	(Portugal) João Félix	7	0	3	10
4	10	FW	(Argentina) Ángel Correa	9	0	0	9
5	21	MF	(Belgium) Yannick Carrasco	6	0	1	7
6	8	MF	(Spain) Saúl	2	0	0	2
6	11	MF	(France) Thomas Lemar	1	1	0	2
6	19	FW	(Spain) Diego Costa^{2}	2	0	0	2
6	22	DF	(Spain) Mario Hermoso	1	0	1	2
10	2	DF	(Uruguay) José Giménez	0	0	1	1
10	5	MF	(Uruguay) Lucas Torreira	1	0	0	1
10	6	MF	(Spain) Koke	1	0	0	1
10	12	DF	(Brazil) Renan Lodi	1	0	0	1
10	15	DF	(Montenegro) Stefan Savić	1	0	0	1
10	24	DF	(Croatia) Šime Vrsaljko	0	1	0	1
10	29	DF	(Spain) Ricard Sánchez^{1}	0	1	0	1
Own goals				2	0	0	2
Totals				67	3	7	77

^{1}Player from reserve team (Atlético Madrid B).
^{2}Player left the club during the season.

=== Clean sheets ===
Rank	No.	Pos.	Player	Matches played	Clean sheet %	La Liga (%)	Copa del Rey (%)	Champions League (%)	Total
1	13	GK	(Slovenia) Jan Oblak	46	43%	18 (47%)	0 (0%)	2 (25%)	20
2	1	GK	(Croatia) Ivo Grbić	1	100%	0 (0%)	1 (100%)	0 (0%)	1
3	31	GK	(Spain) Miguel San Román^{1}	1	0%	0 (0%)	0 (0%)	0 (0%)	0
Totals				48	43%	18 (47%)	1 (50%)	2 (25%)	21

^{1}Player from reserve team (Atlético Madrid B).

=== Attendances ===
	Matches	Attendances	Average	High	Low
La Liga	19	0	0	0	0
Copa del Rey	0	0	0	0	0
Champions League	4	0	0	0	0
Total	23	0	0	0	0
