= 2017 Coupe de la Ligue final =

French League Cup Final
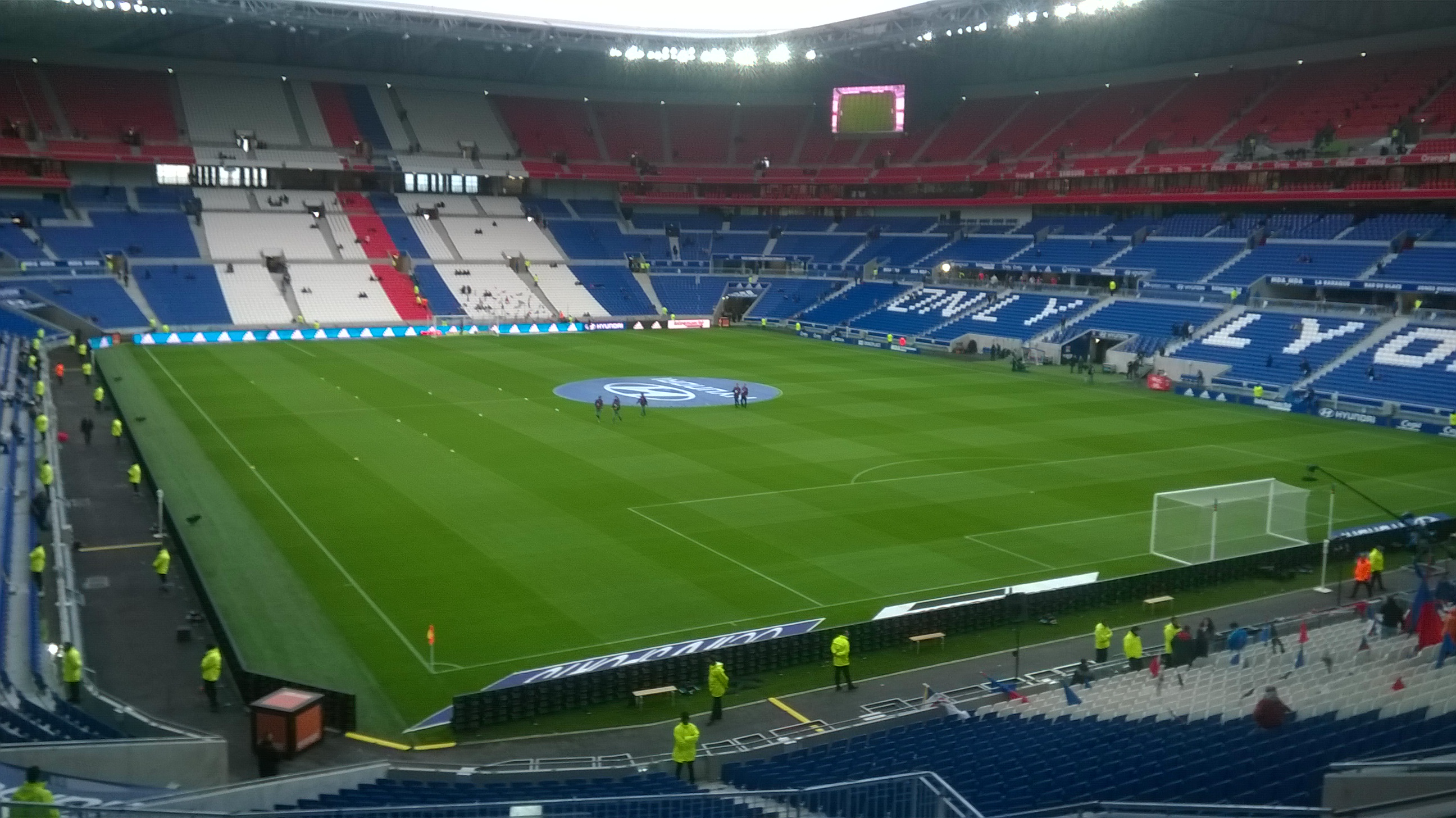
- The Parc Olympique Lyonnais in Décines-Charpieu hosted the final
- Event: 2016–17 Coupe de la Ligue
Monaco	Paris Saint-Germain
1	4
- Date: 1 April 2017
- Venue: Parc Olympique Lyonnais, Décines-Charpieu
- Man of the Match: Ángel Di María (Paris Saint-Germain)
- Referee: Frank Schneider
- Attendance: 57,841
- Weather: Clear; 10 °C (50 °F); 87% humidity

The 2017 Coupe de la Ligue final was the 23rd final of France's football league cup competition, the Coupe de la Ligue, a competition for the 42 teams that the Ligue de Football Professionnel (LFP) manages. The final took place on 1 April 2017 at the Parc Olympique Lyonnais in Décines-Charpieu and was contested by Monaco and reigning champions Paris Saint-Germain.

Paris Saint-Germain won the final 4–1 for their 4th consecutive and 7th overall Coupe de la Ligue title.

== Route to the final ==
Note: In all results below, the score of the finalist is given first (H: home; A: away).

Monaco		Round	Paris Saint-Germain	
Opponent	Result	2016–17 Coupe de la Ligue	Opponent	Result
Rennes (H)	7–0	Round of 16	Lille (H)	3–1
Sochaux (A)	1–1 (a.e.t.) (4–3 p)	Quarter-finals	Metz (H)	2–0
Nancy (H)	1–0	Semi-finals	Bordeaux (A)	4–1

== Match ==
=== Details ===
1 April 2017
21:00 CEST

Monaco	1–4	Paris Saint-Germain
Lemar 27'	Report	Draxler 4'; Di María 44'; Cavani 54', 90'

Parc Olympique Lyonnais, Décines-Charpieu
Attendance: 57,841
Referee: Frank Schneider

Monaco	Paris Saint-Germain

GK	1	(Croatia) Danijel Subašić
RB	19	(France) Djibril Sidibé		(substituted off) 90+3'
CB	25	(Poland) Kamil Glik
CB	5	(Brazil) Jemerson
LB	23	(France) Benjamin Mendy	(yellow card) 62'
RM	10	(Portugal) Bernardo Silva
CM	8	(Portugal) João Moutinho
CM	14	(France) Tiémoué Bakayoko
LM	27	(France) Thomas Lemar		(substituted off) 77'
CF	18	(France) Valère Germain (c)		(substituted off) 62'
CF	29	(France) Kylian Mbappé
Substitutes:
GK	16	(Italy) Morgan De Sanctis
DF	6	(Brazil) Jorge
DF	24	(Italy) Andrea Raggi
DF	35	(France) Kévin N'Doram
DF	38	(Mali) Almamy Touré		(substituted on) 90+3'
MF	7	(Morocco) Nabil Dirar		(substituted on) 62'
FW	37	(France) Irvin Cardona		(substituted on) 77'
Manager:
(Portugal) Leonardo Jardim

GK	1	(Germany) Kevin Trapp	(yellow card) 66'
RB	19	(Ivory Coast) Serge Aurier
CB	2	(Brazil) Thiago Silva (c)
CB	3	(France) Presnel Kimpembe
LB	20	(France) Layvin Kurzawa	(yellow card) 56'
CM	6	(Italy) Marco Verratti		(substituted off) 81'
CM	8	(Italy) Thiago Motta		(substituted off) 87'
CM	25	(France) Adrien Rabiot
RF	11	(Argentina) Ángel Di María
CF	9	(Uruguay) Edinson Cavani
LF	23	(Germany) Julian Draxler		(substituted off) 55'
Substitutes:
GK	16	(France) Alphonse Areola
DF	12	(Belgium) Thomas Meunier
DF	17	(Brazil) Maxwell
MF	7	(Brazil) Lucas Moura		(substituted on) 87'
MF	10	(Argentina) Javier Pastore		(substituted on) 55'
MF	14	(France) Blaise Matuidi		(substituted on) 81'
MF	21	(France) Hatem Ben Arfa
Manager:
(Spain) Unai Emery

Man of the Match:
Ángel Di María (Paris Saint-Germain)

Assistant referees:
Djemel Zitouni
Nicolas Henninot
Fourth official:
Mikael Lesage

Match rules

- 90 minutes.
- 30 minutes of extra time if necessary.
- Penalty shoot-out if scores still level.
- Seven named substitutes, of which up to three may be used.

== See also ==
- 2017 Coupe de France final
- 2016–17 AS Monaco FC season
- 2016–17 Paris Saint-Germain FC season
- 2018 Coupe de la Ligue final - played between same clubs
