= Parc Olympique Lyonnais =

Multi-purpose stadium in Lyon, France

Coordinates: 45°45′55″N 4°58′56″E

Parc Olympique Lyonnais Groupama Stadium

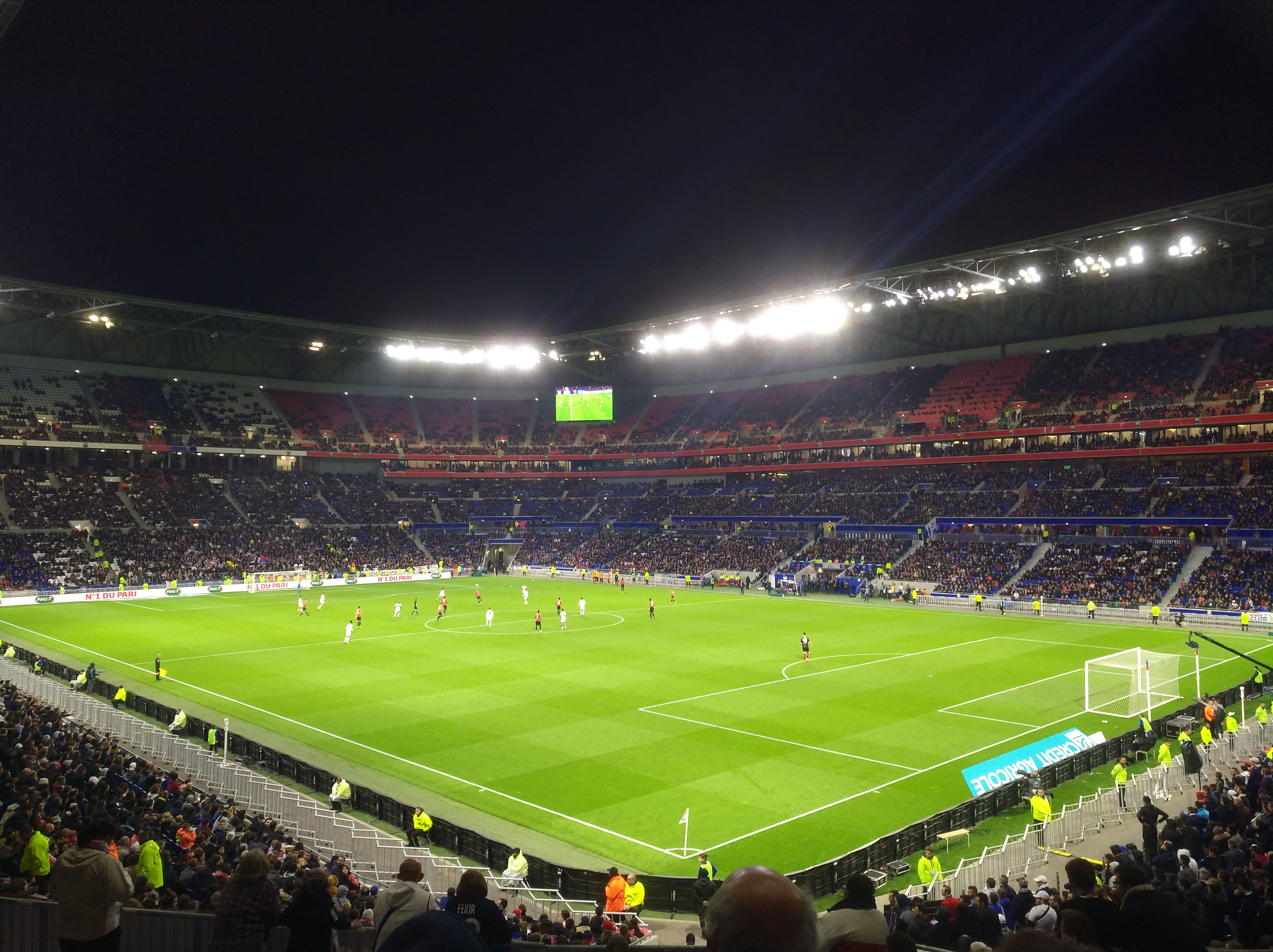
- UEFA
- Interactive map of Parc Olympique Lyonnais; Groupama Stadium
- Address: 10 Avenue Simone Veil
- Location: Décines-Charpieu, Metropolis of Lyon, France
- Owner: OL Groupe
- Operator: OL Groupe
- Capacity: 59,186
- Executive suites: 105
- Surface: AirFibr hybrid grass
- Record attendance: Sports: 58,741; 20 June 2025 Toulouse vs Bayonne (Rugby; Top 14 semi-final); Concerts: 72,561; 25 June 2022 Indochine, Central Tour
- Field size: 105 × 68 metres (344 ft × 223 ft)
- Public transit: Décines–OL Vallée; Décines–OL Vallée

Construction
- Groundbreaking: October 22, 2012; 13 years ago
- Opened: January 9, 2016; 10 years ago
- Cost: €480 million
- Architect: Populous
- Structural engineer: Vinci SA
- Services engineer: Vinci SA
- General contractor: Vinci SA

Tenants
- Olympique Lyonnais (2016–present); France national football team (selected matches); OL Lyonnes (UWCL matches; 2018-present)

Website
- Official website

Parc Olympique Lyonnais, known for sponsorship reasons as Groupama Stadium, is a 59,186-seater stadium in Décines-Charpieu, a commune situated in the Metropolis of Lyon. It is the third largest stadium in France, behind Stade de France in Saint-Denis (Paris) and Orange Velodrome in Marseille.

The home of French football club Olympique Lyonnais, it replaced their previous stadium, the Stade de Gerland, in January 2016. The Stade de Gerland became the home of Lyon OU Rugby.

The stadium was a host of UEFA Euro 2016, and was also chosen to stage the 2017 Coupe de la Ligue Final and the 2018 UEFA Europa League Final, in addition to the 2019 FIFA Women's World Cup and football at the 2024 Summer Olympics in Paris. Outside football, the ground has also held rugby union and ice hockey matches, as well as musical concerts.

== Construction ==
On 1 September 2008, Olympique Lyonnais president Jean-Michel Aulas announced plans to create a new 60,000-seat stadium, tentatively called OL Land, to be built on 50 hectares of land located in Décines-Charpieu, a suburb of Lyon. The stadium would also include state-of-the-art sporting facilities, two hotels, a leisure center, and commercial and business offices.

On 13 October 2008, the project was agreed upon by the French government, the General Council of Rhône, the Grand Lyon, SYTRAL, and the commune of Décines for construction with approximately €180 million of public money being used and between €60–80 million coming from the Urban Community of Lyon. The project was hindered by slow administrative procedures, political interests, and various opposition groups who viewed the stadium as financially, ecologically, and socially wrong for the taxpayers and community of Décines. After landscaping in 2012, stadium construction started in summer 2013.

== Football ==
Olympique Lyonnais played their first game in the new stadium on 9 January 2016, winning 4–1 against Troyes in Ligue 1; Alexandre Lacazette scored the first goal at the ground.

In September 2016, the new stadium was chosen as the host of the 2017 Coupe de la Ligue Final, the first time that the final had been hosted outside the Paris area. Paris Saint-Germain won 4–1 against Monaco. On 9 December 2016, UEFA announced that Parc OL had been chosen to host the 2018 UEFA Europa League Final on 16 May 2018.

The current record league attendance at the Parc OL is 58,257, achieved on 9 November 2025 during a fixture against Paris Saint-Germain during the 2025–26 Ligue 1 season. The current record European league attendance is 58,018, achieved during a fixture against Manchester United on 10 April 2025 during the 2024–25 Europa League season.

Lyon's average domestic league attendances in the Parc OL are listed below.

Season	Average	League
2016–17	39,171	Ligue 1
2017–18	46,005	Ligue 1
2018–19	49,079	Ligue 1
2019–20	47,299	Ligue 1
2020–21	N/A	Ligue 1
2021–22	32,331	Ligue 1
2022–23	46,058	Ligue 1
2023–24	43,642	Ligue 1
2024–25	50,994	Ligue 1
2025–26	49,848	Ligue 1

=== UEFA Euro 2016 ===
In November 2009, the French Football Federation chose Parc Olympique Lyonnais one of the twelve stadiums to be used in the country's bidding for UEFA Euro 2016. It hosted six games at the tournament, including the hosts' 2–1 win over the Republic of Ireland in the last 16, and eventual champions Portugal's 2–0 win over Wales in the semi-finals.

Date	Time (CEST)	Team #1	Result	Team #2	Round	Attendance
13 June 2016	21:00	Belgium	0–2	Italy	Group E	55,408
16 June 2016	18:00	Ukraine	0–2	Northern Ireland	Group C	51,043
19 June 2016	21:00	Romania	0–1	Albania	Group A	49,752
22 June 2016	18:00	Hungary	3–3	Portugal	Group F	55,514
26 June 2016	15:00	France	2–1	Republic of Ireland	Round of 16	56,279
6 July 2016	21:00	Portugal	2–0	Wales	Semi-finals	55,679

=== 2019 FIFA Women's World Cup ===
The Parc OL was one of nine stadiums hosting matches at the 2019 FIFA Women's World Cup, staging the semi-finals and the final.

Date	Time (CEST)	Team #1	Result	Team #2	Round	Attendance
2 July 2019	21:00	England	1–2	United States	Semi-finals	53,512
3 July 2019	21:00	Netherlands	1–0 (a.e.t.)	Sweden	Semi-finals	48,452
7 July 2019	17:00	United States	2–0	Netherlands	Final	57,900

=== France national football team ===
Date	Team #1	Result	Team #2	Competition
9 June 2018	France	1–1	United States	Friendly
7 September 2021	France	2–0	Finland	2022 World Cup qualification
23 March 2024	France	0–2	Germany	Friendly
9 September 2024	France	2–0	Belgium	2024–25 UEFA Nations League A

=== 2024 UEFA Women's Nations League Finals ===
The stadium was one of three selected to host the 2024 UEFA Women's Nations League Finals matches. It hosted one match.

Date	Team #1	Result	Team #2	Round	Attendance
23 February 2024	France	2–1	Germany	Semi-finals	30,267

=== 2024 Summer Olympics ===
11 matches, 5 men's and 6 women's, were hosted in the stadium during the 2024 Summer Olympics.

Date	Team #1	Result	Team #2	Round	Attendance
24 July 2024	Iraq	2–1	Ukraine	Men's group B	10,637
25 July 2024	France	3–2	Colombia	Women's group A	29,208
27 July 2024	Argentina	3–1	Iraq	Men's group B	30,008
28 July 2024	New Zealand	0–2	Colombia	Women's group A	5,212
30 July 2024	Ukraine	0–2	Argentina	Men's group B	10,017
31 July 2024	New Zealand	1–2	France	Women's group A	21,946
2 August 2024	Japan	0–3	Spain	Men's quarter-finals	19,111
3 August 2024	Spain	2–2 (4–2 p)	Colombia	Women's quarter-finals	10,355
5 August 2024	France	3–1 (a.e.t.)	Egypt	Men's semi-finals	47,530
6 August 2024	United States	1–0 (a.e.t.)	Germany	Women's semi-finals	11,716
9 August 2024	Spain	0–1	Germany	Women's bronze medal match	10,995

== Rugby ==
=== 2023 Rugby World Cup ===
Date	Time (CEST)	Team #1	Result	Team #2	Round	Attendance
24 September 2023	21:00	Wales	40–6	Australia	Pool C	55,296
27 September 2023	17:45	Uruguay	36–26	Namibia	Pool A	49,342
29 September 2023	21:00	New Zealand	96–17	Italy	Pool A	57,083
5 October 2023	21:00	New Zealand	73–0	Uruguay	Pool A	57,672
6 October 2023	21:00	France	60–7	Italy	Pool A	58,102

=== France national rugby union team ===
Date	Team #1	Result	Team #2	Competition	Attendance	Note
14 November 2017	France	23–28	New Zealand	2017 Autumn Internationals	58,607	Uncapped match played between two official tests
16 March 2024	France	33–31	England	2024 Six Nations Championship	58,195	—N/a

=== European Rugby Cups finals ===
Date	Team #1	Result	Team #2	Competition	Attendance
13 May 2016	Harlequins (England)	19–26	(France) Montpellier	2015–16 European Rugby Challenge Cup	28,556
14 May 2016	Racing 92 (France)	9–21	(England) Saracens	2015–16 European Rugby Champions Cup	58,017

=== Top 14 ===
Date	Team #1	Result	Team #2	Round	Attendance
25 May 2018	Lyon	14–40	Montpellier	2017–18 Top 14 semi-finals	58,664
26 May 2018	Racing 92	14–19	Castres	2017–18 Top 14 semi-finals	56,272
20 June 2025	Toulouse	32–25	Bayonne	2024–25 Top 14 semi-finals	58,741
21 June 2025	Bordeaux Bègles	39–24	Toulon	2024–25 Top 14 semi-finals	58,408

== Concerts ==
List of concerts at Parc Olympique Lyonnais, showing date, artist, event and attendance
Date	Artist	Event	Attendance
9 January 2016	will.i.am	Stadium inauguration	55,169
23 March 2016	Christophe Maé	2015–16 UEFA Women's Champions League	11,732
19 July 2016	Rihanna	Anti World Tour	—
8 June 2017	Coldplay	A Head Full of Dreams Tour	50,901
12 July 2017	Celine Dion	Celine Dion Live 2017	39,507
24 May 2019	Ed Sheeran	÷ Tour	55,897
25 May 2019	Ed Sheeran	÷ Tour	56,050
26 May 2019	Ed Sheeran	÷ Tour	51,759
1 June 2019	Stars 80	Triomphe	17,284
4 June 2019	Phil Collins	Not Dead Yet Tour	34,163
11 June 2022	Soprano	Chasseur d'étoiles Tour	50,440
25 June 2022	Indochine	Central Tour	72,561
8 July 2022	Rammstein	Rammstein Stadium Tour	49,124
9 July 2022	Rammstein	Rammstein Stadium Tour	49,560
19 July 2022	The Rolling Stones	Sixty Tour	50,319
31 May 2023	Depeche Mode	Memento Mori World Tour	52,000
15 June 2023	Muse	Will of the People World Tour	59,000
23 June 2023	Mylène Farmer	Nevermore 2023/2024	45,000
24 June 2023	Mylène Farmer	Nevermore 2023/2024	45,000
11 July 2023	Red Hot Chili Peppers	Global Stadium Tour	49,158
2 June 2024	Taylor Swift	The Eras Tour	62,000
3 June 2024	Taylor Swift	The Eras Tour	—
15 June 2024	Rammstein	Rammstein Stadium Tour	—
22 June 2024	Coldplay	Music of the Spheres World Tour	164,641
23 June 2024	Coldplay	Music of the Spheres World Tour	164,641
25 June 2024	Coldplay	Music of the Spheres World Tour	164,641
16 June 2026	Linkin Park	From Zero World Tour	—
28 June 2026	Iron Maiden	Run for Your Lives World Tour	—
21 July 2027	Karol G	Viajando Por El Mundo Tropitour	—

== Other uses ==
The venue hosted an outdoor Ligue Magnus ice hockey game between Lyon and Grenoble on 30 December 2016. In that game, Grenoble defeated Lyon 5–2; the attendance at that game was 25,142, which turned out to be the all-time record attendance for an ice hockey game in France.

Parc Olympique Lyonnais hosted the finals of rugby union's European Rugby Champions Cup and European Rugby Challenge Cup in 2016. It was one of nine venues chosen for France's hosting of the 2023 Rugby World Cup.

The stadium will also host the match between France and England on the final weekend of the 2024 Six Nations on 16 March 2024; this is because the Stade de France in Saint-Denis is unavailable while it is being prepared for use in the 2024 Summer Olympics.

Preceded by Twickenham Stadium; London	European Rugby Champions Cup; Final venue 2016	Succeeded by Murrayfield Stadium; Edinburgh
Preceded by Twickenham Stoop; London	European Rugby Challenge Cup; Final venue 2016	Succeeded by Murrayfield Stadium; Edinburgh
Preceded by Stade de France; Paris	Coupe de la Ligue; Final venue 2017	Succeeded by Nouveau Stade de Bordeaux; Bordeaux
Preceded by Friends Arena; Solna	UEFA Europa League; Final venue 2018	Succeeded by Baku Olympic Stadium; Baku
Preceded by BC Place; Vancouver	FIFA Women's World Cup; Final venue 2019	Succeeded by Stadium Australia; Sydney
