= Dylan Beaulieu =

French footballer (born 1997)

Personal information
- Full name: Dylan Beaulieu
- Date of birth: 5 May 1997 (age 29)
- Place of birth: Meudon, France
- Height: 1.72 m (5 ft 7 1/2 in)
- Position: Midfielder

Team information
- Current team: Lusitanos

Youth career
- –2012: Montrouge FC 92
- 2012–2017: Monaco

Senior career*
Years	Team	Apps	(Gls)
2016–2017	Monaco B	20	(3)
2018–2019	Granville	13	(0)
2019–	Lusitanos	0	(0)
- * Club domestic league appearances and goals as of 01:08, 5 July 2019 (UTC)

Dylan Beaulieu (born 5 May 1997) is a French footballer who plays as a midfielder for US Lusitanos Saint-Maur.

== Club career ==
=== Monaco ===
Beaulieu made his professional debut on 26 April 2017 in the Coupe de France semi-final against Paris Saint-Germain. He started the game and played the whole match in a 5–0 away loss.

=== Lusitanos ===
In June 2019, Beaulieu joined US Lusitanos Saint-Maur.

== Career statistics ==
=== Club ===
As of 26 April 2017

Club	Season	League		Cup		League Cup		Europe		Other		Total	
Club	Season	Apps	Goals	Apps	Goals	Apps	Goals	Apps	Goals	Apps	Goals	Apps	Goals
Monaco	2016–17	0	0	1	0	0	0	0	0	—		1	0
Career total		0	0	1	0	0	0	0	0	0	0	1	0
