= Jemerson =

Brazilian footballer (born 1992)

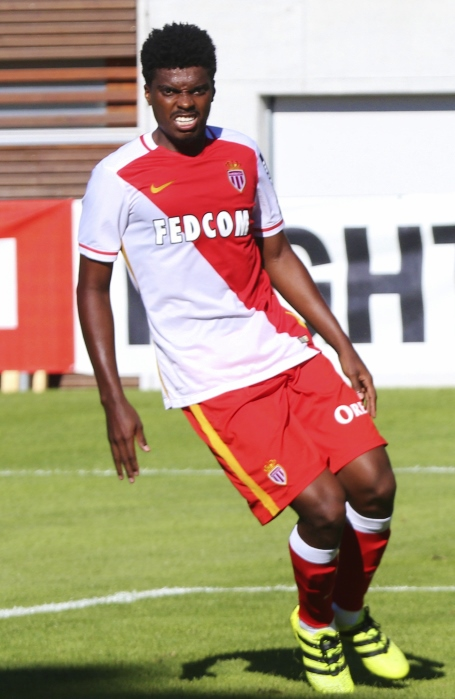
- Jemerson playing for Monaco in 2016

Personal information
- Full name: Jemerson de Jesus Nascimento
- Date of birth: 24 August 1992 (age 34)
- Place of birth: Jeremoabo, Brazil
- Height: 1.84 m (6 ft 1/2 in)
- Position: Centre back

Team information
- Current team: São Bernardo
- Number: 35

Youth career
- 2009–2010: Confiança
- 2010–2012: Atlético Mineiro

Senior career*
Years	Team	Apps	(Gls)
2012–2015	Atlético Mineiro	81	(7)
2012	→ Democrata-SL (loan)	12	(0)
2016	Monaco II	1	(1)
2016–2020	Monaco	109	(4)
2020–2021	Corinthians	18	(2)
2021–2022	Metz	15	(0)
2022–2024	Atlético Mineiro	65	(0)
2024–2026	Grêmio	31	(2)
2026–	São Bernardo	31	(2)

International career^{‡}
2017	Brazil	2	(0)
- * Club domestic league appearances and goals as of 18 November 2026 ‡ National team caps and goals as of 10 November 2017

Jemerson de Jesus Nascimento (born 24 August 1992), known simply as Jemerson, is a Brazilian professional footballer who plays as a centre-back for São Bernardo.

== Club career ==
Born in Jeremoabo, Bahia, Jemerson only played as an amateur until 2009, signing for Confiança. He joined Atlético Mineiro's youth setup in the following year, after failed trials at Palmeiras, Santos and Vasco.

=== Atlético Mineiro ===
Jemerson made his senior debut in 2012, while on loan at Democrata, appearing in 12 matches. He subsequently returned to Galo in August and was promoted to the senior squad on a permanent basis in December.

Jemerson made his first team – and Série A – debut on 7 July 2013, starting and being booked in a 3–2 home win against Criciúma. A backup to Leonardo Silva and Réver, he only appeared in five matches during the campaign.

In 2014, Jemerson profited from Réver's serious ankle injury, and was a starter for the majority of the year.

=== Monaco ===
On 31 January 2016, Jemerson signed for Ligue 1 club Monaco on a five-year contract. He was a starter during the 2016–17 campaign, in which the team won the league and reached the semifinals of the UEFA Champions League. He left the club after terminating his contract on 2 November 2020.

=== Corinthians ===
On 5 November 2020, Jemerson returned to Brazil as he signed with Corinthians on an eight-month transfer.

=== Metz ===
On 8 October 2021, Jemerson signed for Ligue 1 side FC Metz until the end of the season. On 29 April 2022, his contract with Metz was terminated by mutual consent.

=== Return to Atlético Mineiro ===
On 20 June 2022, Atlético Mineiro announced the return of Jemerson to the club.

=== Grêmio ===
On 22 May 2024, Grêmio announced that they had reached an agreement for the signing of Jemerson.

== International career ==
Jemerson received his first international call-up for a 2018 FIFA World Cup qualification match against Peru on 17 November 2015.

He made his debut for the national team in a June 2017 friendly away against Australia, which Brazil won 4–0.

== Career statistics ==
=== Club ===
As of 5 February 2025

Appearances and goals by club, season and competition
Club	Season	League			State League		National Cup		League Cup		Continental		Other		Total	
Club	Season	Division	Apps	Goals	Apps	Goals	Apps	Goals	Apps	Goals	Apps	Goals	Apps	Goals	Apps	Goals
Democrata-SL	2012	Mineiro 2ª Divisão	—		12 (Note: Appearances in Campeonato Mineiro Segunda Divisão)	0	—		—		—		—		12	0
Atlético Mineiro	2013	Série A	5	0	—		0	0	—		—		—		5	0
Atlético Mineiro	2014	Série A	22	0	5 (Note: Appearances in Campeonato Mineiro)	1	8	1	—		0	0	1 (Note: Appearances in Recopa Sudamericana)	0	36	2
Atlético Mineiro	2015	Série A	35	4	14	2	2	0	—		8 (Note: Appearances in Copa Libertadores)	0	—		59	6
Atlético Mineiro	Total		62	4	19	3	10	1	—		8	0	1	0	100	8
Monaco	2015–16	Ligue 1	4	0	—		1	0	0	0	0	0	—		5	0
Monaco	2016–17	Ligue 1	34	2	—		2	0	3	0	15 (Note: Appearances in UEFA Champions League)	0	—		54	2
Monaco	2017–18	Ligue 1	33	2	—		1	0	3	0	6	0	1 (Note: Appearances in Trophée des Champions)	0	44	2
Monaco	2018–19	Ligue 1	25	0	—		2	0	2	0	5	0	1	0	35	0
Monaco	2019–20	Ligue 1	13	0	—		1	0	1	0	—		—		15	0
Monaco	2020–21	Ligue 1	0	0	—		0	0	0	0	—		—		0	0
Monaco	Total		109	4	—		7	0	9	0	26	0	2	0	153	4
Monaco II	2015–16	CFA	1	1	—		—		—		—		—		1	1
Corinthians	2020	Série A	7	0	—		—		—		—		—		7	0
Corinthians	2021	Série A	0	0	11 (Note: Appearances in Campeonato Paulista)	2	2	1	—		1 (Note: Appearances in Copa Sudamericana)	0	—		14	3
Corinthians	Total		7	0	11	2	2	1	—		1	0	—		21	3
Metz	2021–22	Ligue 1	15	0	—		1	0	—		—		—		16	0
Atlético Mineiro	2022	Série A	12	0	—		—		—		—		—		12	0
Atlético Mineiro	2023	Série A	32	0	7	0	3	0	—		11	0	—		53	0
Atlético Mineiro	2024	Série A	3	0	11	0	0	0	—		4	0	—		18	0
Atlético Mineiro	Total		47	0	18	0	3	0	—		15	0	—		83	0
Grêmio	2024	Série A	13	1	—		2	0	—		2	0	—		17	1
Grêmio	2025	Série A	0	0	3 (Note: Appearances in Campeonato Gaúcho)	0	0	0	—		0	0	—		3	0
Grêmio	Total		13	1	3	0	2	0	—		2	0	—		20	1
Career total			254	10	66	5	25	2	9	0	52	0	3	0	406	17

=== International ===
As of 26 November 2021

Brazil
Year	Apps	Goals
2017	2	0
Total	2	0

== Honours ==
=== Club ===
Atlético Mineiro

- Copa Libertadores: 2013
- Recopa Sudamericana: 2014
- Copa do Brasil: 2014
- Campeonato Mineiro: 2013, 2015, 2023, 2024

Monaco

- Ligue 1: 2016–17

=== Individual ===
- Best Centre-back in Brazil: 2015
- Campeonato Brasileiro Série A Team of the Year: 2015
