= 2018–19 AS Monaco FC season =

Monaco
2018–19 season
- President: Dmitry Rybolovlev
- Head coach: Leonardo Jardim (until 11 October); Thierry Henry (13 October – 24 January); Franck Passi (caretaker) (24–25 January); Leonardo Jardim (from 25 January)
- Stadium: Stade Louis II
- Ligue 1: 17th
- Coupe de France: Round of 32
- Coupe de la Ligue: Semi-finals
- Trophée des Champions: Runners-up
- UEFA Champions League: Group stage
- Top goalscorer: League: Radamel Falcao (15); All: Radamel Falcao (16)
- Highest home attendance: League/All: 14,269 (26 August v. Marseille)
- Lowest home attendance: League: 5,502 (25 September v. Angers); All: 600 (22 January v. Metz, CdF)
- Average home league attendance: 8,447
- Biggest win: 3–1 (11 August at Nantes); 2–0 (4 December at Amiens); 2–0 (24 February v. Lyon); 2–0 (18 May v. Amiens)
- Biggest defeat: 0–4 (4 August v. Paris Saint-Germain); 0–4 (6 November v. Club Brugge); 0–4 (11 November v. Paris Saint-Germain); 1–5 (19 January v. Strasbourg)
Home colours	Away colours	Third colours

The 2018–19 season was AS Monaco FC's sixth consecutive season in Ligue 1 since promotion from Ligue 2 in 2013. They participated in the Coupe de France, the Coupe de la Ligue, the Trophée des Champions and the UEFA Champions League.

== Season events ==
On 11 October, AS Monaco announced that they had parted ways with manager Leonardo Jardim. Two days later, 13 October, AS Monaco announced the appointment of Thierry Henry as their new head coach on a contract until June 2021. On 24 January, AS Monaco announced that they had suspended Thierry Henry and that Franck Passi would be leading the team while they made their decision on Henry's future. The following day, AS Monaco announced Henrys permanent departure and the re-appointment of Leonardo Jardim as manager.

=== Transfers ===
==== Summer ====
On 8 June, AS Monaco announced that Terence Kongolo would be joining Huddersfield Town on a permanent basis when the transfer window opened on 1 July. The following day, 9 June, Samuel Grandsir signed for AS Monaco from Troyes on a five-year contract to begin 1 July 2018.

On 13 June, goalkeeper Paul Nardi joined Cercle Brugge on a season-long loan deal, with Pierre-Daniel N'Guinda, Yoann Etienne and Kevin Appin all joining Cercle Brugge on loan for the 2018–19 season on 16 June. Four days later, on 20 June, Guévin Tormin also joined Cercle Brugge on a season-long loan deal.

On 19 June, Willem Geubbels joined Monaco from Lyon.

On 23 June, Gil Dias joined Nottingham Forest on loan for the 2018–19 season.

On 27 June, Monaco announced the departure of Mehdi Beneddine to Quevilly-Rouen.

On 28 June, Tiago Ribeiro joined Monaco's Academy squad from Porto, while Franck Irie joined Cercle Brugge on a season-long loan deal. The following day, on 29 June, Sofiane Diop and Isidor Wilson joined Monaco from Rennes.

On 2 July, Robert Navarro joined Monaco from Barcelona.

On 4 July, Irvin Cardona re-joined Cercle Brugge on loan for the 2018–19 season.

On 6 July, Monaco announced the signing of Jonathan Panzo from Chelsea, and Pelé on a five-year contract from Rio Ave.

On 9 July, AS Monaco announced the signing of Ronaël Pierre-Gabriel on a five-year contract from Saint-Étienne.

On 10 July, AS Monaco announced the signing of Antonio Barreca on a five-year contract from Torino, with Soualiho Meïté going in the opposite direction.

On 20 July, striker Adama Diakhaby followed Terence Kongolo in signing for Huddersfield Town for an undisclosed fee.

On 24 July, Monaco signed Jean-Eudes Aholou from Strasbourg on a five-year contract, while João Moutinho moved to Wolverhampton Wanderers and Adrien Bongiovanni joined Cercle Brugge on loan for the season.

On 27 July, Monaco announced the signing of Aleksandr Golovin to a five-year contract for an undisclosed fee from CSKA Moscow. Three days later, on 30 July, Monaco confirmed that Thomas Lemar had left the club to sign for Atlético Madrid.

On 5 August, Monaco announced that Rachid Ghezzal had joined Leicester City, with Nabil Alioui joining Cercle Brugge on loan the next day.

Two days later, on 7 August, Boschilia extended his Monaco contract until the summer of 2021, then joined Nantes on a season-long loan deal, while Álvaro Llorente moved to Extremadura on a season-long loan. On 8 August, Jonathan Mexique joined Cholet on a season-long loan deal.

On 13 August, young midfielder Ibrahima Diallo joined Brest on a season-long loan deal, while Keita Baldé joined Inter Milan on a season-long loan deal with an option to make the move permanent.

On 22 August, Dinis Almeida joined Xanthi on a season-long loan deal.

On 28 August, Benjamin Henrichs joined AS Monaco on a five-year contract from Bayer Leverkusen.

On 30 August, Nacer Chadli signed a three-year contract with AS Monaco from West Bromwich Albion, Jorge joined Porto on a season-long loan deal and Lacina Traoré had his contract terminated by mutual consent. The following day, Elderson Echiéjilé also left AS Monaco after his contract was also terminated by mutual consent.

==== Winter ====
On 2 January, AS Monaco announced their first signing of the winter transfer window, with Lyle Foster arriving from Orlando Pirates to sign until June 2023. The following day, 3 January, AS Monaco announced the signing of Naldo on an 18-month contract, after his Schalke 04 ended. On 10 January, Fodé Ballo-Touré signed from Lille on a contract until June 2023. The following day, 11 January, Cesc Fàbregas signed for AS Monaco on a contract until June 2022, and William Vainqueur joined on loan from Antalyaspor on 12 January. On 20 January, Samuel Grandsir was sent on loan to Strasbourg for the remainder of the 2018–19 season. On 24 January, AS Monaco and Nottingham Forest agreed to cancel Gil Dias's loan deal, allowing Dias to sign for Olympiacos on loan until 30 June 2020.

On 27 January, AS Monaco announced the arrival of Gelson Martins on loan from Atlético Madrid until the end of the season. On 30 January, AS Monaco announced the signing of Carlos Vinícius on loan until the end of the season.

On 31 January, transfer deadline day, Georges-Kévin Nkoudou joined from Tottenham Hotspur on loan until the end of the season, whilst Youssef Aït Bennasser, Pelé. Antonio Barreca, Almamy Touré, Adama Traoré and Loïc Badiashile all left on loan for the remainder of the season, joining Saint-Étienne, Nottingham Forest, Newcastle United, Eintracht Frankfurt, Cercle Brugge and Rennes, respectively.

Also on transfer deadline day, Adrien Silva joined on loan from Leicester City for the remainder of the season, with Youri Tielemans going the opposite way on loan for the rest of the season.

=== Contract extensions ===
On 11 July, Julien Serrano extended his contract with AS Monaco until the summer of 2022.

On 18 July, Kévin N'Doram extended his contract with AS Monaco until the summer of 2023.

== Squad ==
As of match played 24 May 2019

No.	Name	Nationality	Position	Date of birth (age)	Signed from	Signed in	Contract ends	Apps.	Goals
Goalkeepers
1	Danijel Subašić	(Croatia)	GK	27 October 1984 (aged 34)	Hajduk Split	2012		291	1
16	Diego Benaglio	(Switzerland)	GK	8 September 1983 (aged 35)	VfL Wolfsburg	2017	2020	38	0
30	Seydou Sy	(Senegal)	GK	12 December 1995 (aged 23)	Academy	2014		8	0
40	Hugo Hagege	(France)	GK	12 November 1999 (aged 19)	Nice	2017		0	0
Defenders
2	Fodé Ballo-Touré	(France)	DF	3 January 1997 (aged 22)	Lille	2019	2023	20	0
5	Jemerson	(Brazil)	DF	24 August 1992 (aged 26)	Atlético Mineiro	2016	2021	86	2
18	Ronaël Pierre-Gabriel	(France)	DF	13 June 1998 (aged 20)	Saint-Étienne	2018	2023	4	0
19	Djibril Sidibé	(France)	DF	29 July 1992 (aged 26)	Lille	2016	2021	110	6
21	Julien Serrano	(France)	DF	13 February 1998 (aged 21)	Le Pontet	2013	2022	11	0
24	Andrea Raggi	(Italy)	DF	24 June 1984 (aged 34)	Bologna	2012	2020	230	10
25	Kamil Glik	(Poland)	DF	3 February 1988 (aged 31)	Torino	2016	2020	142	13
27	Naldo	(Brazil)	DF	10 September 1982 (aged 36)	Schalke 04	2019	2020	9	0
32	Benoît Badiashile	(France)	DF	6 March 2001 (aged 18)	Academy	2016		26	1
37	Jonathan Panzo	(England)	DF	25 October 2000 (aged 18)	Chelsea	2018		1	0
39	Benjamin Henrichs	(Germany)	DF	23 February 1997 (aged 22)	Bayer Leverkusen	2018	2023	28	1
46	Giulian Biancone	(France)	DF	31 March 2000 (aged 19)	Academy	2018		5	1
	Jordy Gaspar	(France)	DF	23 April 1997 (aged 22)	Lyon	2017	2020	0	0
Midfielders
4	Jean-Eudes Aholou	(Ivory Coast)	MF	20 March 1994 (aged 25)	Strasbourg	2018	2023	21	0
6	Kévin N'Doram	(France)	MF	28 December 1995 (aged 23)	Academy	2014	2023	29	1
7	Rony Lopes	(Portugal)	MF	28 December 1995 (aged 23)	Manchester City	2015		80	21
12	William Vainqueur	(France)	MF	19 November 1988 (aged 30)	loan from Antalyaspor	2019	2019	4	0
14	Georges-Kévin Nkoudou	(France)	MF	13 February 1995 (aged 24)	loan from Tottenham Hotspur	2019	2019	3	0
15	Adrien Silva	(Portugal)	MF	15 March 1989 (aged 30)	loan from Leicester City	2019	2019	15	0
17	Aleksandr Golovin	(Russia)	MF	30 May 1996 (aged 22)	CSKA Moscow	2018	2023	34	4
20	Nacer Chadli	(Belgium)	MF	2 August 1989 (aged 29)	West Bromwich Albion	2018	2021	21	0
26	Robert Navarro	(Spain)	MF	12 April 2002 (aged 17)	Barcelona	2018		1	0
29	Gelson Martins	(Portugal)	MF	11 May 1995 (aged 24)	loan from Atlético Madrid	2019	2019	17	4
31	Romain Faivre	(France)	MF	14 July 1998 (aged 20)	Tours	2017		4	0
36	Sofiane Diop	(France)	MF	9 June 2000 (aged 18)	Rennes	2018		21	0
43	Khéphren Thuram	(France)	MF	26 March 2001 (aged 18)	Academy	2018		3	0
44	Cesc Fàbregas	(Spain)	MF	4 May 1987 (aged 32)	Chelsea	2019	2022	15	1
Forwards
9	Radamel Falcao	(Colombia)	FW	10 February 1986 (aged 33)	Atlético Madrid	2013		139	83
10	Stevan Jovetić	(Montenegro)	FW	2 November 1989 (aged 29)	Inter Milan	2017		31	12
11	Carlos Vinícius	(Brazil)	FW	25 March 1995 (aged 24)	loan from Napoli	2019	2019	16	2
13	Willem Geubbels	(France)	FW	16 August 2001 (aged 17)	Lyon	2018		2	0
22	Jordi Mboula	(Spain)	FW	16 March 1999 (aged 20)	Barcelona B	2018	2022	10	1
23	Pietro Pellegri	(Italy)	FW	17 March 2001 (aged 18)	Genoa	2018		5	1
33	Lyle Foster	(South Africa)	FW	3 September 2000 (aged 18)	Orlando Pirates	2019	2023	0	0
34	Moussa Sylla	(France)	FW	25 November 1999 (aged 19)	Academy	2014		33	4
35	Wilson Isidor	(France)	FW	27 August 2000 (aged 18)	Rennes	2018		3	0
41	Gobé Gouano	(France)	FW	10 December 2000 (aged 18)	Academy	2018		1	0
42	Han-Noah Massengo	(France)	FW	7 July 2001 (aged 17)	Academy	2018		7	0
Unregistered
	Safwan Mbaé	(France)	DF	20 April 1997 (aged 22)	Academy	2016		1	0
Players away on loan
3	Antonio Barreca	(Italy)	DF	18 March 1995 (aged 24)	Torino	2018	2023	9	0
6	Jorge	(Brazil)	DF	28 March 1996 (aged 23)	Flamengo	2017		32	2
8	Youri Tielemans	(Belgium)	MF	7 May 1997 (aged 22)	Anderlecht	2017	2022	64	6
11	Adama Traoré	(Mali)	MF	28 June 1995 (aged 23)	Lille	2015		25	5
14	Keita Baldé	(Senegal)	FW	8 March 1995 (aged 24)	Lazio	2017		34	8
15	Youssef Aït Bennasser	(Morocco)	MF	7 July 1996 (aged 22)	Nancy	2016		18	0
26	Boschilia	(Brazil)	MF	5 March 1996 (aged 23)	São Paulo	2015	2021	29	8
27	Adrien Bongiovanni	(Belgium)	MF	20 September 1999 (aged 19)	Standard Liège	2015		1	0
28	Pelé	(Guinea-Bissau)	MF	29 September 1991 (aged 27)	Rio Ave	2018	2023	11	0
29	Samuel Grandsir	(France)	FW	14 August 1996 (aged 22)	Troyes	2018	2023	17	1
38	Almamy Touré	(Mali)	DF	28 April 1996 (aged 23)	Academy	2011		56	6
40	Loïc Badiashile	(France)	GK	5 February 1998 (aged 21)	SC Malesherbes	2013		6	0
	Álvaro Fernández	(Spain)	GK	13 April 1998 (aged 21)	Osasuna	2017	2020	0	0
	Ibrahima Diallo	(France)	MF	3 August 1999 (aged 19)	Academy	2014		0	0
Left during the season
7	Rachid Ghezzal	(Algeria)	MF	9 May 1992 (aged 27)	Lyon	2017	2021	35	2
	Elderson Echiéjilé	(Nigeria)	DF	20 January 1988 (aged 31)	Braga	2014		54	2
	Lacina Traoré	(Ivory Coast)	FW	20 May 1990 (aged 29)	Anzhi Makhachkala	2014		35	11

=== Out on loan ===
Note: Flags indicate national team as defined under FIFA eligibility rules; some limited exceptions apply. Players may hold more than one non-FIFA nationality.

No.	Pos.	Nation	Player
—	GK	ESP	Álvaro Fernández (on loan to Extremadura)
—	GK	FRA	Paul Nardi (on loan to Cercle Brugge)
—	DF	BRA	Jorge (on loan to Porto)
—	DF	CMR	Pierre-Daniel N'Guinda (on loan to Cercle Brugge)
—	DF	FRA	Yoann Etienne (on loan to Cercle Brugge)
—	DF	ITA	Antonio Barreca (on loan to Newcastle United)
—	DF	POR	Dinis Almeida (on loan to Xanthi)
—	MF	BEL	Adrien Bongiovanni (on loan to Cercle Brugge)
—	MF	BEL	Youri Tielemans (on loan to Leicester City)
—	MF	BRA	Boschilia (on loan to Nantes)
—	MF	FRA	Kévin Appin (on loan to Cercle Brugge)

No.	Pos.	Nation	Player
—	MF	FRA	Ibrahima Diallo (on loan to Brest)
—	MF	FRA	Jonathan Mexique (on loan to Cholet)
—	MF	FRA	Guevin Tormin (on loan to Cercle Brugge)
—	MF	GUI	Pelé (on loan to Nottingham Forest)
—	MF	MAR	Youssef Aït Bennasser (on loan to Saint-Étienne)
—	MF	POR	Gil Dias (on loan to Olympiacos)
—	FW	FRA	Nabil Alioui (on loan to Cercle Brugge)
—	FW	FRA	Irvin Cardona (on loan to Cercle Brugge)
—	FW	FRA	Samuel Grandsir (on loan to Strasbourg)
—	FW	SEN	Keita Baldé (on loan to Inter Milan)

=== Reserves ===
As of 29 August 2018

Note: Flags indicate national team as defined under FIFA eligibility rules; some limited exceptions apply. Players may hold more than one non-FIFA nationality.

No.	Pos.	Nation	Player
—	GK	MAR	Yanis Henin
—	DF	FRA	Yannis N'Gakoutou-Yapende
—	DF	FRA	Abdoulaye Koté
—	DF	CIV	Jonathan Cissé
—	MF	FRA	Jalil Enjolras
—	MF	FRA	Tristan Muyumba
—	MF	POR	Tiago Ribeiro

No.	Pos.	Nation	Player
—	MF	BEL	Francesco Antonucci
—	MF	MLI	Salam Jiddou
—	MF	BEL	Eliot Matazo
—	MF	FRA	Théo Epailly
—	FW	FRA	Jason Mbock
—	FW	GHA	Eric Ayiah

== Transfers ==
=== In ===
Date	Position	Nationality	Name	From	Fee	Ref.
9 June 2018†	FW	(France)	Samuel Grandsir	Troyes	Undisclosed	
19 June 2018†	FW	(France)	Willem Geubbels	Lyon	Undisclosed	
28 June 2018†	MF	(Portugal)	Tiago Ribeiro	Porto	Undisclosed	
29 June 2018†	MF	(France)	Sofiane Diop	Rennes	Undisclosed	
29 June 2018†	FW	(France)	Wilson Isidor	Rennes	Undisclosed	
2 July 2018	MF	(Spain)	Robert Navarro	Barcelona	Undisclosed	
6 July 2018	DF	(England)	Jonathan Panzo	Chelsea	Undisclosed	
6 July 2018	MF	(Guinea-Bissau)	Pelé	Rio Ave	Undisclosed	
9 July 2018	DF	(France)	Ronaël Pierre-Gabriel	Saint-Étienne	Undisclosed	
10 July 2018	DF	(Italy)	Antonio Barreca	Torino	Undisclosed	
24 July 2018	MF	(Ivory Coast)	Jean-Eudes Aholou	Strasbourg	Undisclosed	
27 July 2018	MF	(Russia)	Aleksandr Golovin	CSKA Moscow	Undisclosed	
28 August 2018	DF	(Germany)	Benjamin Henrichs	Bayer Leverkusen	Undisclosed	
30 August 2018	MF	(Belgium)	Nacer Chadli	West Bromwich Albion	Undisclosed	
2 January 2019	FW	(South Africa)	Lyle Foster	Orlando Pirates	Undisclosed	
3 January 2019	DF	(Brazil)	Naldo	Schalke 04	Free	
10 January 2019	DF	(France)	Fodé Ballo-Touré	Lille	Undisclosed	
11 January 2019	MF	(Spain)	Cesc Fàbregas	Chelsea	Undisclosed	

† Transfers arranged on the above dates, but were not finalised until 1 July.

=== Out ===
Date	Position	Nationality	Name	To	Fee	Ref.
28 May 2018†	MF	(Brazil)	Fabinho	Liverpool	£39,000,000	
8 June 2018†	DF	(Netherlands)	Terence Kongolo	Huddersfield Town	Undisclosed	
27 June 2018	DF	(France)	Mehdi Beneddine	Quevilly-Rouen	Undisclosed	
30 June 2018	DF	(Portugal)	Rúben Vinagre	Wolverhampton Wanderers	Undisclosed	
10 July 2018	MF	(France)	Soualiho Meïté	Torino	Undisclosed	
20 July 2018	FW	(France)	Adama Diakhaby	Huddersfield Town	Undisclosed	
24 July 2018	MF	(Portugal)	João Moutinho	Wolverhampton Wanderers	£5,000,000	
30 July 2018	MF	(France)	Thomas Lemar	Atlético Madrid	€70,000,000	
5 August 2018	MF	(Algeria)	Rachid Ghezzal	Leicester City	Undisclosed	
	FW	(France)	Ilyes Chaïbi	MC Alger	Undisclosed	
	FW	(France)	Kylian Mbappé	Paris Saint-Germain	€180,000,000	

† Transfers arranged on the above dates, but were not finalized until 1 July.

=== Loans in ===
Date from	Position	Nationality	Name	From	Date to	Ref.
12 January 2019	MF	(France)	William Vainqueur	Antalyaspor	End of season	
27 January 2019	MF	(Portugal)	Gelson Martins	Atlético Madrid	End of season	
30 January 2019	FW	(Brazil)	Carlos Vinícius	Napoli	End of season	
31 January 2019	MF	(France)	Georges-Kévin Nkoudou	Tottenham Hotspur	End of season	
31 January 2019	MF	(Portugal)	Adrien Silva	Leicester City	End of season	

=== Loans out ===
Date from	Position	Nationality	Name	To	Date to	Ref.
13 June 2018	GK	(France)	Paul Nardi	Cercle Brugge	End of season	
16 June 2018	DF	(Cameroon)	Pierre-Daniel N'Guinda	Cercle Brugge	End of season	
16 June 2018	DF	(France)	Yoann Etienne	Cercle Brugge	End of season	
16 June 2018	MF	(France)	Kevin Appin	Cercle Brugge	End of season	
20 June 2018	MF	(France)	Guévin Tormin	Cercle Brugge	End of season	
23 June 2018	MF	(Portugal)	Gil Dias	Nottingham Forest	24 January 2019	
28 June 2018	MF	(Ivory Coast)	Franck Irie	Cercle Brugge	End of season	
4 July 2018	FW	(France)	Irvin Cardona	Cercle Brugge	End of season	
24 July 2018	MF	(Belgium)	Adrien Bongiovanni	Cercle Brugge	End of season	
4 August 2018	MF	(France)	Jonathan Mexique	Cholet	End of season	
6 August 2018	FW	(France)	Nabil Alioui	Cercle Brugge	End of season	
7 August 2018	MF	(Brazil)	Boschilia	Nantes	End of season	
7 August 2018	GK	(Spain)	Álvaro Fernández	Extremadura	End of season	
13 August 2018	MF	(France)	Ibrahima Diallo	Brest	End of season	
13 August 2018	FW	(Senegal)	Keita Baldé	Inter Milan	End of season	
22 August 2018	DF	(Portugal)	Dinis Almeida	Xanthi	End of season	
30 August 2018	DF	(Brazil)	Jorge	Porto	End of season	
20 January 2019	FW	(France)	Samuel Grandsir	Strasbourg	End of season	
24 January 2019	MF	(Portugal)	Gil Dias	Olympiacos	30 June 2020	
31 January 2019	MF	(Guinea-Bissau)	Pelé	Nottingham Forest	End of season	
31 January 2019	MF	(Morocco)	Youssef Aït Bennasser	Saint-Étienne	End of season	
31 January 2019	DF	(Italy)	Antonio Barreca	Newcastle United	End of season	
31 January 2019	DF	(Mali)	Almamy Touré	Eintracht Frankfurt	End of season	
31 January 2019	MF	(Mali)	Adama Traoré	Cercle Brugge	End of season	
31 January 2019	GK	(France)	Loïc Badiashile	Stade Rennais	End of season	
31 January 2019	MF	(Belgium)	Youri Tielemans	Leicester City	End of season	

=== Released ===
Date	Position	Nationality	Name	Joined	Date
30 August 2018	FW	(Ivory Coast)	Lacina Traoré	Újpest	23 February 2019
31 August 2018	DF	(Nigeria)	Elderson Echiéjilé	HJK	9 March 2019

== Friendlies ==
7 July 2018	Wisła Kraków	1–1 (5–4 p)	Monaco	Kraków, Poland
18:00 CEST (UTC+02:00)	Pietrzak 7'	Report	Mboula 60'	Stadium: Stadion Miejski im. Henryka Reymana
	Penalties
	Ondrášek (penalty scored); Kort (penalty scored); Boguski (penalty scored); Sadlok (penalty scored); Laskoś (penalty scored)		(penalty scored) Boschilia; (penalty scored) Navarro; (penalty scored) Mboula; (penalty scored) Diakhaby; (penalty missed) Traoré

8 July 2018	Ruch Chorzów	0–3	Monaco	Kraków, Poland
14:30 CEST (UTC+02:00)		Report	Boschilia 14'; Geubbels 69'; Jovetić 85'	Stadium: Stadion Miejski im. Henryka Reymana

14 July 2018	Cercle Brugge	2–3	Monaco	Bruges, Belgium
18:00 CEST (UTC+02:00)	Pierre-Gabriel 44' (o.g.); Cardona 49'	Report	Jovetić 25'; Lopes 27'; Geubbels 77'	Stadium: Jan Breydel Stadium

21 July 2018	SC Paderborn	3–2	Monaco	Paderborn, Germany
16:00 CEST (UTC+02:00)	Gjasula 27'; Tietz 69'; Zolinski 72'	Report	S. Diop 36', 51'	Stadium: Benteler-Arena

25 July 2018	VfL Bochum	2–2	Monaco	Verl, Germany
18:00 CEST (UTC+02:00)	M'boussy 40'; Hinterseer 69'	Report	Lopes 2', 42'	Stadium: Sportclub Arena

28 July 2018	Hamburger SV	3–1	Monaco	Hamburg, Germany
16:00 CEST (UTC+02:00)	Narey 30', 43'; Lasogga 73'	Report	Lopes 47'	Stadium: Volksparkstadion

== Competitions ==
=== Overview ===
Competition	First match	Last match	Starting round	Final position	Record							
Competition	First match	Last match	Starting round	Final position	Pld	W	D	L	GF	GA	GD	Win %
Ligue 1	11 August 2018	24 May 2019	Matchday 1	17th	38	8	12	18	38	57	−19	21.05
Coupe de France	6 January 2019	22 January 2019	Round of 64	Round of 32	2	1	0	1	2	3	−1	50.00
Coupe de la Ligue	19 December 2018	29 January 2019	Round of 16	Semi-finals	3	1	2	0	4	3	+1	33.33
Trophée des Champions	4 August 2018		Final	Runners-up	1	0	0	1	0	4	−4	0.00
UEFA Champions League	18 September 2018	11 December 2019	Group stage	Group stage	6	0	1	5	2	14	−12	0.00
Total					50	10	15	25	46	81	−35	20.00

Source: Soccerway

=== Trophée des Champions ===
4 August 2018	Paris Saint-Germain	4–0	Monaco	Shenzhen, China
14:00 CEST (UTC+02:00)	Di María 33', 90+2'; Nkunku 40'; Weah 68'	Report	Aholou (yellow card) 5'	Stadium: Shenzhen Universiade Sports Centre; Attendance: 41,237; Referee: Ruddy Buquet

=== Ligue 1 ===
==== League table ====
Pos	Team	Pld	W	D	L	GF	GA	GD	Pts	Qualification or relegation
15	Amiens	38	9	11	18	31	52	−21	38	
16	Toulouse	38	8	14	16	35	57	−22	38	
17	Monaco	38	8	12	18	38	57	−19	36	
18	Dijon (O)	38	9	7	22	31	60	−29	34	Qualification to Relegation play-offs
19	Caen (R)	38	7	12	19	29	54	−25	33	Relegation to Ligue 2

Source: Ligue 1 and Soccerway
Rules for classification: 1) Points; 2) Goal difference; 3) Head-to-head points; 4) Head-to-head goal difference; 5) Head-to-head goals scored; 6) Head-to-head away goals scored; 7) Goals scored; 8) Away goals scored; 9) Most goals scored in single league match; 10) Fairplay ranking.
(O) Play-off winners; (R) Relegated

==== Results summary ====
Overall								Home						Away					
Pld	W	D	L	GF	GA	GD	Pts	W	D	L	GF	GA	GD	W	D	L	GF	GA	GD
38	8	12	18	38	57	−19	36	4	6	9	19	29	−10	4	6	9	19	28	−9

Last updated: 24 May 2019.
Source: Results

==== Results by round ====
Round	1	2	3	4	5	6	7	8	9	10	11	12	13	14	15	16	17	18	19	20	21	22	23	24	25	26	27	28	29	30	31	32	33	34	35	36	37	38
Ground	A	H	A	H	A	H	H	A	H	A	H	A	H	A	H	A	H	A	H	A	H	A	H	A	H	H	A	H	A	H	A	H	A	A	H	A	H	A
Result	W	D	L	L	D	D	L	L	L	L	D	L	L	W	L	W	D	L	L	D	L	L	W	D	W	W	D	D	W	L	D	D	L	D	L	L	W	L
Position	4	6	10	13	15	16	18	18	18	19	19	19	19	19	19	18	19	19	19	19	19	19	18	18	17	16	16	17	16	16	16	16	16	16	17	17	16	17

Source: Results
A = Away; H = Home; W = Win; D = Draw; L = Loss

==== Results ====
11 August 2018 1	Nantes	1–3	Monaco	Nantes
17:00 CEST (UTC+02:00)	Diego Carlos (yellow card) 74'; Sala 90+2'	Report	Lopes 69'; Jovetić 80'; Falcao 83'	Stadium: Stade de la Beaujoire; Attendance: 32,760; Referee: Jérôme Brisard

18 August 2018 2	Monaco	0–0	Lille	Monaco
20:00 CEST (UTC+02:00)	Mboula (yellow card) 37'; Falcao (penalty missed) 69'	Report	Xeka (yellow card) 15'; Mendes (yellow card) 64'; Çelik (yellow card) 67'	Stadium: Stade Louis II; Attendance: 11,140; Referee: Thomas Léonard

26 August 2018 3	Bordeaux	2–1	Monaco	Bordeaux
17:00 CEST (UTC+02:00)	Kamano 48', 90+2' (pen.), (yellow card) 89'	Report	Pellegri 63', (yellow card) 90+3'; Benaglio (yellow card) 85'	Stadium: Matmut Atlantique; Attendance: 21,607; Referee: Clément Turpin

2 September 2018 4	Monaco	2–3	Marseille	Monaco
21:00 CEST (UTC+02:00)	Glik (yellow card) 35'; Tielemans 48'; Falcao 53'	Report	Mitroglou 45+1'; Thauvin 74'; Amavi (yellow card) 78'; Germain 90+1'	Stadium: Stade Louis II; Attendance: 14,269; Referee: Benoît Milot

15 September 2018 5	Toulouse	1–1	Monaco	Toulouse
20:00 CEST (UTC+02:00)	Amian (yellow card) 38'; Gradel (yellow card) 73'; Leya Iseka 79'	Report	Jemerson (yellow card) 28'; Henrichs (yellow card) 48'; Tielemans 57'; Diop (yellow card) 81'	Stadium: Stadium Municipal; Attendance: 16,689; Referee: Ruddy Buquet

21 September 2018 6	Monaco	1–1	Nîmes	Monaco
20:45 CEST (UTC+02:00)	Falcao 27'; N'Doram (yellow card) 90+4'	Report	Guillaume (yellow card) 4'; Briançon 19'; Diallo (yellow card) 75'	Stadium: Stade Louis II; Attendance: 6,837; Referee: Amaury Delerue

25 September 2018 7	Monaco	0–1	Angers	Monaco
19:00 CEST (UTC+02:00)	Falcao (yellow card) 39'	Report	N'Doye (yellow card) 13'; Bahoken 27'; Thomas (yellow card) 83'	Stadium: Stade Louis II; Attendance: 5,502; Referee: Willy Delajod

28 September 2018 8	Saint-Étienne	2–0	Monaco	Saint-Étienne
20:45 CEST (UTC+02:00)	Khazri 41', 54'	Report	N'Doram (yellow card) 13'	Stadium: Stade Geoffroy-Guichard; Attendance: 26,486; Referee: Jérôme Brisard

7 October 2018 9	Monaco	1–2	Rennes	Monaco
17:00 CEST (UTC+02:00)	Raggi (red card) 45+1'; Falcao 49'; Jemerson (yellow card) 60'; Tielemans (yellow card) 65'; Glik (yellow card) 75'; Golovin (yellow card) 79'; Sidibé (yellow card) 85'	Report	Da Silva 14', (yellow card) 66'; Ben Arfa 77'	Stadium: Stade Louis II; Attendance: 6,268; Referee: Olivier Thual

20 October 2018 10	Strasbourg	2–1	Monaco	Strasbourg
20:00 CEST (UTC+02:00)	Mitrović (yellow card) 15'; Thomasson 17'; Mothiba 84'; Sissoko (yellow card) 87'	Report	Aholou (yellow card) 46'; Chadli (yellow card) 55'; Grandsir (red card) 66'; Tielemans 90+1' (pen.), (yellow card) 90+4'	Stadium: Stade de la Meinau; Attendance: 25,358; Referee: Nicolas Rainville

27 October 2018 11	Monaco	2–2	Dijon	Monaco
20:00 CEST (UTC+02:00)	Henrichs 30'; Tielemans (yellow card) 54'; Glik 78'; Golovin (yellow card) 81'	Report	Alphonse 34'; Loiodice (yellow card) 51'; Abeid 57'; Marié (yellow card) 90'; Tavares (yellow card) 90+2'	Stadium: Stade Louis II; Attendance: 7,139; Referee: Jérôme Miguelgorry

3 November 2018 12	Reims	1–0	Monaco	Reims
20:00 CEST (UTC+02:00)	Cafaro 24'; Romao (red card) 50'	Report	Pelé (yellow card) 58' (yellow-red card) 71'; Grandsir (yellow card) 88'	Stadium: Stade Auguste-Delaune; Attendance: 16,005; Referee: Hakim Ben el Hadj

11 November 2018 13	Monaco	0–4	Paris Saint-Germain	Monaco
21:00 CEST (UTC+02:00)		Report	Cavani 5', 12', 53'; Neymar 64' (pen.)	Stadium: Stade Louis II; Attendance: 12,533; Referee: Ruddy Buquet

24 November 2018 14	Caen	0–1	Monaco	Caen
20:00 CET (UTC+01:00)	Ninga (yellow card) 38'; Baysse (yellow card) 52'	Report	Falcao 55'; Golovin (yellow card) 77'; Pierre-Gabriel (yellow card) 90+6'; Aït Bennasser (yellow card) 90+7'	Stadium: Stade Michel d'Ornano; Attendance: 15,013; Referee: Thomas Leonard

1 December 2018 15	Monaco	1–2	Montpellier	Monaco
20:00 CET (UTC+01:00)	Tielemans 42'	Report	Laborde 81'; Škuletić 86'	Stadium: Stade Louis II; Attendance: 6,725; Referee: Olivier Thual

4 December 2018 16	Amiens	0–2	Monaco	Amiens
19:00 CET (UTC+01:00)	Monconduit (yellow card) 54'; Adénon (yellow card) 90'; Dibassy (red card) 90+3'	Report	Falcao 43' (pen.), 90+6' (pen.); Tielemans (yellow card) 60'; Aït Bennasser (yellow card) 86'	Stadium: Stade de la Licorne; Attendance: 11,048; Referee: Jérôme Brisard

16 December 2018 18	Lyon	3–0	Monaco	Décines-Charpieu
21:00 CET (UTC+01:00)	Aouar 6'; Fekir 34'; Depay (yellow card) 46'; Mendy 59'	Report	Falcao (yellow card) 46'; Golovin (red card) 47'; Raggi (yellow card) 48'	Stadium: Parc Olympique Lyonnais; Attendance: 46,474; Referee: Clément Turpin

22 December 2018 19	Monaco	0–2	Guingamp	Monaco
CET (UTC+01:00)	Faivre (yellow card) 25'; Glik (yellow card) 81'	Report	Ikoko (yellow card) 14'; Rebocho (yellow card) 26'; Thuram 68'; Roux 75', (yellow card) 90+2'; Fofana (yellow card) 78'	Stadium: Stade Louis II; Attendance: 6,424; Referee: Frank Schneider

13 January 2019 20	Marseille	1–1	Monaco	Marseille
21:00 CET (UTC+01:00)	Lopez 13'; Sanson (yellow card) 58'; Ocampos (yellow card) 74'	Report	Tielemans 38'; Sylla (yellow card) 79'	Stadium: Stade Vélodrome; Attendance: 44,315; Referee: Mikael Lesage

16 January 2019 17	Monaco	1–1	Nice	Monaco
19:00 CET (UTC+01:00)	B. Badiashile 50'; Serrano (yellow card) 60'; Falcao (yellow card) 90+6'	Report	Saint-Maximin 30', (penalty missed) 77'; Jallet (yellow card) 37'; Sacko (red card) 45+3'; Dante (yellow card) 61'	Stadium: Stade Louis II; Attendance: 11,345; Referee: Benoît Bastien
Note: The match, originally scheduled for 7 December 2018, was postponed at the request of the government of the Principality of Monaco and in conjunction with the prefecture of Alpes-Maritimes.

19 January 2019 21	Monaco	1–5	Strasbourg	Monaco
20:00 CET (UTC+01:00)	Naldo (red card) 7'; Glik (yellow card) 8'; Falcao 22', (yellow card) 77'; B. Badiashile (yellow card) 37'; Fàbregas (yellow card) 72'	Report	Ajorque 12', 68'; Thomasson 17'; Martin (yellow card) 29'; Mitrović (yellow card) 36', (red card) 69'; Sissoko 63'; Fofana 90+4'	Stadium: Stade Louis II; Attendance: 7,298; Referee: François Letexier

26 January 2019 22	Dijon	2–0	Monaco	Dijon
20:00 CET (UTC+01:00)	Kwon 24'; Sliti 69'; Saïd (yellow card) 79'; Haddadi (yellow card) 90'; Lautoa (yellow card) 90'	Report	Tielemans (yellow card) 49'; Naldo (red card) 60'; Henrichs (yellow card) 62'	Stadium: Stade Gaston Gérard; Attendance: 12,060; Referee: Eric Wattellier

2 February 2019 23	Monaco	2–1	Toulouse	Monaco
20:00 CET (UTC+01:00)	Ballo-Touré (yellow card) 9'; Golovin 15'; Fàbregas 62'; Jemerson (yellow card) 90+4'	Report	Jullien 20'; Gradel (yellow card) 45+2'; Diakité (yellow card) 50'; Sylla (yellow card) 60'	Stadium: Stade Louis II; Attendance: 5,896; Referee: Mikael Lesage

10 February 2019 24	Montpellier	2–2	Monaco	Montpellier
15:00 CET (UTC+01:00)	Skhiri (yellow card) 47'; Laborde 66'; Delort 90+1' (pen.)	Report	Martins 15'; Silva (yellow card) 62'; Falcao (yellow card) 68', (goal) 82'; Jemerson (yellow card) 70' (yellow-red card) 90+4'; Glik (yellow card) 90'; Carlos Vinícius (yellow card) 90+3'	Stadium: Stade de la Mosson; Attendance: 13,709; Referee: Frank Schneider

16 February 2019 25	Monaco	1–0	Nantes	Monaco
20:00 CET (UTC+01:00)	Martins 13'; B. Badiashile (yellow card) 25'; Lopes (yellow card) 44'; Golovin (yellow card) 52'; Silva (yellow card) 90+5'	Report	Krhin (yellow card) 73'; Mance (yellow card) 79'	Stadium: Stade Louis II; Attendance: 7,557; Referee: Olivier Thual

24 February 2019 26	Monaco	2–0	Lyon	Monaco
21:00 CET (UTC+01:00)	Martins 18'; R. Lopes 27'; Sidibé (yellow card) 52'; Glik (yellow card) 70'; Falcao (yellow card) 90+3'	Report	Terrier (yellow card) 29'	Stadium: Stade Louis II; Attendance: 10,157; Referee: Benoît Millot

2 March 2019 27	Angers	2–2	Monaco	Angers
20:00 CET (UTC+01:00)	Bamba (yellow card) 16'; Tait 22', 45'; Manceau (yellow card) 69'	Report	Falcao 49', 80' (pen.), (yellow card) 81'; Glik (yellow card) 56'; B. Badiashile (yellow card) 62'	Stadium: Stade Raymond Kopa; Attendance: 11,391; Referee: Antony Gautier

9 March 2019 28	Monaco	1–1	Bordeaux	Monaco
20:00 CET (UTC+01:00)	Falcao 48', (yellow card) 64'; Ballo-Touré (yellow card) 54'; Martins (yellow card) 67'; Jemerson (yellow card) 69'; Silva (yellow card) 82'	Report	Briand 65' (pen.); Maja (yellow card) 90+1'; Tchouaméni (yellow card) 90+1'	Stadium: Stade Louis II; Attendance: 8,042; Referee: François Letexier

15 March 2019 29	Lille	0–1	Monaco	Villeneuve-d'Ascq
20:45 CET (UTC+01:00)	Luiz Araújo (yellow card) 86'; J. Fonte (yellow card) 89'; R. Fonte (yellow card) 90+4'	Report	Jemerson (yellow card) 6'; Sidibé (yellow card) 82'; Carlos Vinícius 90'	Stadium: Stade Pierre-Mauroy; Attendance: 37,724; Referee: Hakim Ben El Hadj

31 March 2019 30	Monaco	0–1	Caen	Monaco
15:00 CEST (UTC+02:00)	B. Badiashile (yellow card) 3'	Report	Crivelli 23'; Ndom (yellow card) 39'; Ninga (yellow card) 52'	Stadium: Stade Louis II; Attendance: 7,031; Referee: Ruddy Buquet

6 April 2019 31	Guingamp	1–1	Monaco	Guingamp
20:00 CEST (UTC+02:00)	Eboa Eboa 23'; Blas (yellow card) 45'; Didot (yellow card) 64'; Roux (yellow card) 80'; Djilobodji (yellow card) 88'	Report	Glik (yellow card) 56'; Sidibé (yellow card) 78'; Jemerson (yellow card) 85'; Carlos Vinícius (yellow card) 89'; Jovetić 90+3', (yellow card) 90+3'	Stadium: Stade de Roudourou; Attendance: 13,997; Referee: Benoît Bastien

13 April 2019 32	Monaco	0–0	Reims	Monaco
20:00 CEST (UTC+02:00)	Subašić (yellow card) 58'; Sidibé (yellow card) 90'	Report		Stadium: Stade Louis II; Attendance: 7,094; Referee: Willy Delajod

21 April 2019 33	Paris Saint-Germain	3–1	Monaco	Paris
21:00 CEST (UTC+02:00)	Mbappé 15', 38', 56'	Report	Glik (yellow card) 30'; Golovin 80'	Stadium: Parc des Princes; Attendance: 43,581; Referee: Clément Turpin

1 May 2019 34	Rennes	2–2	Monaco	Rennes
19:00 CEST (UTC+02:00)	Hunou 3', 9'; Bensebaini (yellow card) 45'; Bourigeaud (yellow card) 86'	Report	Aholou (yellow card) 35'; Falcao (yellow card) 64', (goal) 69', 75'	Stadium: Roazhon Park; Attendance: 28,285; Referee: Eric Wattellier

5 May 2019 35	Monaco	2–3	Saint-Étienne	Monaco
17:00 CEST (UTC+02:00)	Martins 18'; Ballo-Touré (yellow card) 31'; Golovin (yellow card) 40'; Silva (yellow card) 82'; Carlos Vinícius 90+2'	Report	Khazri (yellow card) 35'; Debuchy (yellow card) 41'; Hamouma (yellow card) 45'; Vada (yellow card) 51'; Ballo-Touré 59' (o.g.); Cabella 71'; Nordin 80'; Polomat (yellow card) 90+3'	Stadium: Stade Louis II; Attendance: 9,047; Referee: Benoît Millot

11 May 2019 36	Nîmes	1–0	Monaco	Nîmes
20:00 CEST (UTC+02:00)	Ripart 9'; Bouanga (yellow card) 45'	Report	Silva (yellow card) 16'; Golovin (yellow card) 41'; Ballo-Touré (yellow card) 64'; Jemerson (yellow card) 90+3'	Stadium: Stade des Costières; Attendance: 14,811; Referee: Jérémy Stinat

18 May 2019 37	Monaco	2–0	Amiens	Monaco
21:00 CEST (UTC+02:00)	Carlos Vinícius (yellow card) 22'; Falcao 26', (yellow card) 49'; Jemerson (yellow card) 44'; Golovin 82'; Silva (yellow card) 89'; Fàbregas (yellow card) 90+4'	Report	Adénon (yellow card) 22'; Gnahoré (yellow card) 45+1'	Stadium: Stade Louis II; Attendance: 10,188; Referee: Clément Turpin

24 May 2019 38	Nice	2–0	Monaco	Nice
21:05 CEST (UTC+02:00)	B. Badiashile 36' (o.g.); Tameze (yellow card) 44'; Le Bihan 67' (pen.); Makengo (yellow card) 84'	Report	Henrichs (yellow card) 12'; Golovin (yellow card) 21'; Glik (yellow card) 66'	Stadium: Allianz Riviera; Attendance: 23,356; Referee: Ruddy Buquet

=== Coupe de France ===
6 January 2019 Round of 64	Canet Roussillon	0–1	Monaco	Perpignan
14:15 CET (UTC+01:00)	Lopy (red card) 18'; Ba (yellow card) 81'; Lybohy (yellow card) 90+2'	Report	Sylla 2'; Biancone (yellow card) 15'; Barreca (yellow card) 44'; Serrano (yellow card) 45+1'	Stadium: Stade Saint-Michel; Referee: Ben El Hadj Salem

22 January 2019 Round of 32	Monaco	1–3	Metz	Monaco
21:00 CET (UTC+01:00)	Falcao 40'	Report	Hein 32'; Gakpa 62'; Niane 74'; Cohade (yellow card) 88'	Stadium: Stade Louis II; Attendance: 600; Referee: Anthony Gautier

=== Coupe de la Ligue ===
19 December 2018 Round of 16	Monaco	1–0	Lorient	Monaco
21:05 CET (UTC+01:00)	Panzo (yellow card) 13'; Biancone 70'; Grandsir (yellow card) 84'	Report	Wadja (yellow card) 86'	Stadium: Stade Louis II; Attendance: 6,068; Referee: Benoît Millot

9 January 2019 Quarter-finals	Monaco	1–1 (8–7 p)	Rennes	Monaco
18:45 CET (UTC+01:00)	Lopes (yellow card) 24', (goal) 54'; Serrano (yellow card) 29'; Tielemans (yellow card) 50'	Report	Bourigeaud 30'; Bensebaini (yellow card) 74'	Stadium: Stade Louis II; Attendance: 6,022; Referee: Amaury Delerue
	Penalties
	Pelé (penalty scored); Tielemans (penalty missed); Aït Bennasser (penalty scored); Isidor (penalty scored); Glik (penalty missed); Naldo (penalty missed); Diop (penalty scored); Lopes (penalty scored); Serrano (penalty scored); Henrichs (penalty scored); L. Badiashile (penalty scored)		(penalty scored) Niang; (penalty scored) Grenier; (penalty missed) Ben Arfa; (penalty scored) André; (penalty missed) Zeffane; (penalty missed) Da Silva; (penalty scored) Sarr; (penalty scored) Bourigeaud; (penalty scored) Mexer; (penalty scored) Traoré; (penalty missed) Koubek

29 January 2019 Semi-finals	Guingamp	2–2 (5–4 p)	Monaco	Guingamp
CET (UTC+01:00)	Ndong (yellow card) 39'; Mendy 46'; Thuram 55'	Report	Vainquer (red card) 14'; Lopes 18'; Golovin 24'; Ballo-Touré (yellow card) 61'	Stadium: Stade du Roudourou; Attendance: 11,216; Referee: Jérôme Brisard
	Penalties
	Rodelin (penalty scored); Roux (penalty scored); Eboa Eboa (penalty missed); Rebocho (penalty scored); Thuram (penalty missed); Phiri (penalty scored); Coco (penalty scored)		(penalty scored) Fàbregas; (penalty scored) Ballo-Touré; (penalty scored) Jemerson; (penalty missed) Henrichs; (penalty missed) Glik; (penalty scored) Sidibé; (penalty missed) Diop

=== UEFA Champions League ===
==== Group stage ====
Pos	Team	Pld	W	D	L	GF	GA	GD	Pts	Qualification
1	(Germany) Borussia Dortmund	6	4	1	1	10	2	+8	13 (Note: Head-to-head goal difference: Borussia Dortmund +2, Atlético Madrid –2.)	Advance to knockout phase
2	(Spain) Atlético Madrid	6	4	1	1	9	6	+3	13	Advance to knockout phase
3	(Belgium) Club Brugge	6	1	3	2	6	5	+1	6	Transfer to Europa League
4	(France) Monaco	6	0	1	5	2	14	−12	1	

Source: UEFA
Rules for classification: Group stage tiebreakers
Notes:

18 September 2018 1	Monaco (France)	1–2	(Spain) Atlético Madrid	Monaco
21:00 CEST (UTC+02:00)	Falcao (yellow card) 11'; Grandsir 18'; Sidibé (yellow card) 52'; Traoré (yellow card) 78'	Report	Costa 31', (yellow card) 90+2'; Giménez 45+1', (yellow card) 48'	Stadium: Stade Louis II; Attendance: 10,575; Referee: Willie Collum (Scotland)

3 October 2018 2	Borussia Dortmund (Germany)	3–0	(France) Monaco	Dortmund, Germany
21:00 CEST (UTC+02:00)	Bruun Larsen 51'; Alcácer (penalty missed) 69', 72'; Reus 90+2'	Report		Stadium: Westfalenstadion; Attendance: 66,099; Referee: Aleksei Kulbakov (Belarus)

24 October 2018 3	Club Brugge (Belgium)	1–1	(France) Monaco	Bruges, Belgium
18:55 CEST (UTC+02:00)	Wesley 39', (yellow card) 85'; Nakamba (yellow card) 64'; Dennis (yellow card) 89'	Report	Sylla 31'; Sidibé (yellow card) 44'; Jemerson (yellow card) 57'; Tielemans (yellow card) 90+2'	Stadium: Jan Breydel Stadium; Attendance: 23,957; Referee: Michael Oliver (England)

6 November 2018 4	Monaco (France)	0–4	(Belgium) Club Brugge	Monaco
18:55 CET (UTC+01:00)	Barreca (yellow card) 15'	Report	Vanaken 12', 17' (pen.); Wesley 24'; Vormer 85'	Stadium: Stade Louis II; Attendance: 8,347; Referee: Artur Soares Dias (Portugal)

28 November 2018 5	Atlético Madrid (Spain)	2–0	(France) Monaco	Madrid, Spain
18:55 CET (UTC+01:00)	Koke 2'; Griezmann 24', (yellow card) 45'; Savić (yellow card) 62' (yellow-red card) 82'; Partey (yellow card) 86'; Filipe Luís (yellow card) 90+1'	Report	Tielemans (yellow card) 54'; Biancone (yellow card) 68'; Falcao (penalty missed) 83'	Stadium: Wanda Metropolitano; Attendance: 56,314; Referee: Mattias Gestranius (Finland)

11 December 2018 6	Monaco (France)	0–2	(Germany) Borussia Dortmund	Monaco
21:00 CET (UTC+01:00)	Falcao (yellow card) 21'; Raggi (yellow card) 27'; Tielemans (yellow card) 32'; Diop (yellow card) 78'	Report	Guerreiro 15', 88'; Dahoud (yellow card) 49'; Weigl (yellow card) 68'	Stadium: Stade Louis II; Attendance: 8,731; Referee: Craig Pawson (England)

== Statistics ==
=== Appearances and goals ===
As of match played 24 May 2019

No.	Pos	Nat	Player	Total		Ligue 1		Coupe de France		Coupe de la Ligue		Champions League		Trophée des Champions	
No.	Pos	Nat	Player	Apps	Goals	Apps	Goals	Apps	Goals	Apps	Goals	Apps	Goals	Apps	Goals
1	GK	(Croatia) CRO	Danijel Subašić	17	0	14	0	1	0	1	0	1	0	0	0
2	DF	(France) FRA	Fodé Ballo-Touré	20	0	18	0	1	0	1	0	0	0	0	0
4	MF	(Ivory Coast) CIV	Jean-Eudes Aholou	21	0	11+6	0	0	0	0	0	2+1	0	1	0
5	DF	(Brazil) BRA	Jemerson	34	0	24	0	2	0	2	0	5	0	1	0
6	MF	(France) FRA	Kévin N'Doram	5	0	2+2	0	0	0	0	0	1	0	0	0
7	MF	(Portugal) POR	Rony Lopes	29	4	22+2	2	1+1	0	2	2	0	0	1	0
9	FW	(Colombia) COL	Radamel Falcao	38	16	28+4	15	1	1	0	0	4+1	0	0	0
10	FW	(Montenegro) MNE	Stevan Jovetić	10	2	4+4	2	0	0	0	0	1	0	1	0
11	FW	(Brazil) BRA	Carlos Vinícius	16	2	3+13	2	0	0	0	0	0	0	0	0
12	MF	(France) FRA	William Vainqueur	4	0	1+2	0	0	0	1	0	0	0	0	0
13	FW	(France) FRA	Willem Geubbels	2	0	0+1	0	0	0	0+1	0	0	0	0	0
14	FW	(France) FRA	Georges-Kévin Nkoudou	3	0	0+3	0	0	0	0	0	0	0	0	0
15	MF	(Portugal) POR	Adrien Silva	15	0	13+2	0	0	0	0	0	0	0	0	0
16	GK	(Switzerland) SUI	Diego Benaglio	28	0	21+1	0	0	0	0	0	5	0	1	0
17	MF	(Russia) RUS	Aleksandr Golovin	35	4	27+3	3	1	0	1	1	3	0	0	0
18	DF	(France) FRA	Ronaël Pierre-Gabriel	4	0	4	0	0	0	0	0	0	0	0	0
19	DF	(France) FRA	Djibril Sidibé	31	0	21+4	0	1	0	0+1	0	4	0	0	0
20	MF	(Belgium) BEL	Nacer Chadli	21	0	8+7	0	0	0	1	0	4+1	0	0	0
21	DF	(France) FRA	Julien Serrano	7	0	1+2	0	1	0	1	0	0+1	0	1	0
22	FW	(Spain) ESP	Jordi Mboula	8	0	3+3	0	0	0	0	0	0+1	0	0+1	0
23	FW	(Italy) ITA	Pietro Pellegri	2	1	0+2	1	0	0	0	0	0	0	0	0
24	DF	(Italy) ITA	Andrea Raggi	11	0	6	0	0	0	0	0	4	0	1	0
25	DF	(Poland) POL	Kamil Glik	41	1	32	1	1	0	2	0	5	0	1	0
26	MF	(Spain) ESP	Robert Navarro	1	0	0	0	0+1	0	0	0	0	0	0	0
27	DF	(Brazil) BRA	Naldo	9	0	5+2	0	1	0	1	0	0	0	0	0
29	MF	(Portugal) POR	Gelson Martins	17	4	16	4	0	0	1	0	0	0	0	0
30	GK	(Senegal) SEN	Seydou Sy	3	0	2+1	0	0	0	0	0	0	0	0	0
31	MF	(France) FRA	Romain Faivre	4	0	1	0	1	0	2	0	0	0	0	0
32	DF	(France) FRA	Benoît Badiashile	26	1	20	1	1	0	3	0	2	0	0	0
34	FW	(France) FRA	Moussa Sylla	28	2	7+11	0	1+1	1	2	0	4+2	1	0	0
35	FW	(France) FRA	Wilson Isidor	3	0	0+1	0	0+1	0	0+1	0	0	0	0	0
36	MF	(France) FRA	Sofiane Diop	21	0	9+3	0	1	0	1+2	0	2+2	0	0+1	0
37	DF	(England) ENG	Jonathan Panzo	1	0	0	0	0	0	1	0	0	0	0	0
39	DF	(Germany) GER	Benjamin Henrichs	28	1	20+1	1	1	0	2	0	3+1	0	0	0
41	FW	(France) FRA	Gobé Gouano	1	0	0	0	0	0	0	0	0+1	0	0	0
42	FW	(France) FRA	Han-Noah Massengo	7	0	0+3	0	0	0	0+1	0	2+1	0	0	0
43	MF	(France) FRA	Khéphren Thuram	3	0	0	0	0	0	0+1	0	0+2	0	0	0
44	MF	(Spain) ESP	Cesc Fàbregas	15	1	12+1	1	0+1	0	1	0	0	0	0	0
46	DF	(France) FRA	Giulian Biancone	5	1	1	0	1	0	1	1	2	0	0	0
Players away from the club on loan:
3	DF	(Italy) ITA	Antonio Barreca	9	0	7	0	1	0	0	0	1	0	0	0
8	MF	(Belgium) BEL	Youri Tielemans	29	5	19	5	1	0	2	0	6	0	1	0
11	MF	(Mali) MLI	Adama Traoré	7	0	3+3	0	0	0	0	0	0+1	0	0	0
14	FW	(Senegal) SEN	Keita Baldé	1	0	0	0	0	0	0	0	0	0	0+1	0
15	MF	(Morocco) MAR	Youssef Aït Bennasser	18	0	12+1	0	0	0	2	0	3	0	0	0
28	MF	(Guinea) GUI	Pelé	11	0	4+4	0	1	0	0+1	0	0	0	1	0
29	FW	(France) FRA	Samuel Grandsir	17	1	3+8	0	1	0	0+1	0	2+1	1	1	0
38	DF	(Mali) MLI	Almamy Touré	5	0	4	0	0	0	0	0	0+1	0	0	0
40	GK	(France) FRA	Loïc Badiashile	4	0	0	0	1	0	2	0	1	0	0	0
Players who appeared for Monaco no longer at the club:

=== Goalscorers ===
As of match played 24 May 2019

Place	Position	Nation	Number	Name	Ligue 1	Coupe de France	Coupe de la Ligue	Champions League	Trophée des Champions	Total
1	FW	(Colombia)	9	Radamel Falcao	15	1	0	0	0	16
2	MF	(Belgium)	8	Youri Tielemans	5	0	0	0	0	5
3	MF	(Portugal)	29	Gelson Martins	4	0	0	0	0	4
3	MF	(Russia)	17	Aleksandr Golovin	3	0	1	0	0	4
3	MF	(Portugal)	7	Rony Lopes	2	0	2	0	0	4
6	FW	(Montenegro)	10	Stevan Jovetić	2	0	0	0	0	2
6	FW	(Brazil)	11	Carlos Vinícius	2	0	0	0	0	2
6	FW	(France)	34	Moussa Sylla	0	1	0	1	0	2
9	FW	(Italy)	23	Pietro Pellegri	1	0	0	0	0	1
9	DF	(Germany)	39	Benjamin Henrichs	1	0	0	0	0	1
9	DF	(Poland)	25	Kamil Glik	1	0	0	0	0	1
9	DF	(France)	32	Benoît Badiashile	1	0	0	0	0	1
9	MF	(Spain)	44	Cesc Fàbregas	1	0	0	0	0	1
9	DF	(France)	46	Giulian Biancone	0	0	1	0	0	1
9	FW	(France)	29	Samuel Grandsir	0	0	0	1	0	1
				TOTALS	38	1	4	2	0	45

=== Disciplinary record ===
As of match played 24 May 2019

N	P	Nat.	Name	Ligue 1			Coupe de France			Coupe de la Ligue			Champions League			Trophée des Champions			Total			Notes
N	P	Nat.	Name	Yellow card	Second yellow card	Red card	Yellow card	Second yellow card	Red card	Yellow card	Second yellow card	Red card	Yellow card	Second yellow card	Red card	Yellow card	Second yellow card	Red card	Yellow card	Second yellow card	Red card	Notes
1	GK	(Croatia)	Danijel Subašić	1															1			
2	DF	(France)	Fodé Ballo-Touré	4						1									5			
4	MF	(Ivory Coast)	Jean-Eudes Aholou	2												1			3			
5	DF	(Brazil)	Jemerson	9	1								1						10	1		
6	MF	(France)	Kévin N'Doram	2															2			
7	MF	(Portugal)	Rony Lopes	1						1									2			
9	FW	(Colombia)	Radamel Falcao	9									2						11			
10	FW	(Montenegro)	Stevan Jovetić	1															1			
11	FW	(Brazil)	Carlos Vinícius	3															3			
12	MF	(France)	William Vainqueur									1									1	
15	MF	(Portugal)	Adrien Silva	6															6			
16	GK	(Switzerland)	Diego Benaglio	2															2			
17	MF	(Russia)	Aleksandr Golovin	7		1													7		1	
18	DF	(France)	Ronaël Pierre-Gabriel	1															1			
19	DF	(France)	Djibril Sidibé	5									2						7			
20	MF	(Belgium)	Nacer Chadli	1															1			
21	DF	(France)	Julien Serrano	1			1			1									3			
22	FW	(Spain)	Jordi Mboula	1															1			
23	FW	(Italy)	Pietro Pellegri	1															1			
24	DF	(Italy)	Andrea Raggi	1		1							1						2		1	
25	DF	(Poland)	Kamil Glik	10															10			
27	DF	(Brazil)	Naldo			2															2	
29	MF	(Portugal)	Gelson Martins	1															1			
31	MF	(France)	Romain Faivre	1															1			
32	DF	(France)	Benoît Badiashile	4															4			
37	DF	(England)	Jonathan Panzo							1									1			
36	DF	(France)	Sofiane Diop	1									1						2			
34	FW	(France)	Moussa Sylla	1															1			
39	DF	(Germany)	Benjamin Henrichs	3															3			
44	DF	(Spain)	Cesc Fàbregas	2															2			
46	FW	(France)	Giulian Biancone				1						1						2			
Players away on loan:
3	DF	(Italy)	Antonio Barreca				1						1						2			
8	FW	(Belgium)	Youri Tielemans	5						1			3						9			
11	MF	(Mali)	Adama Traoré										1						1			
15	MF	(Morocco)	Youssef Aït Bennasser	2															2			
28	MF	(Guinea)	Pelé	1	1														1	1		
29	FW	(France)	Samuel Grandsir	1		1				1									2		1	

Source: Match reports in Competitive matches
Only competitive matches
Ordered by (red card) , (second yellow card) and (yellow card)
(yellow card) = Number of bookings; (second yellow card) = Number of sending offs after a second yellow card; (red card) = Number of sending offs by a direct red card.
