= 2018 Trophée des Champions =

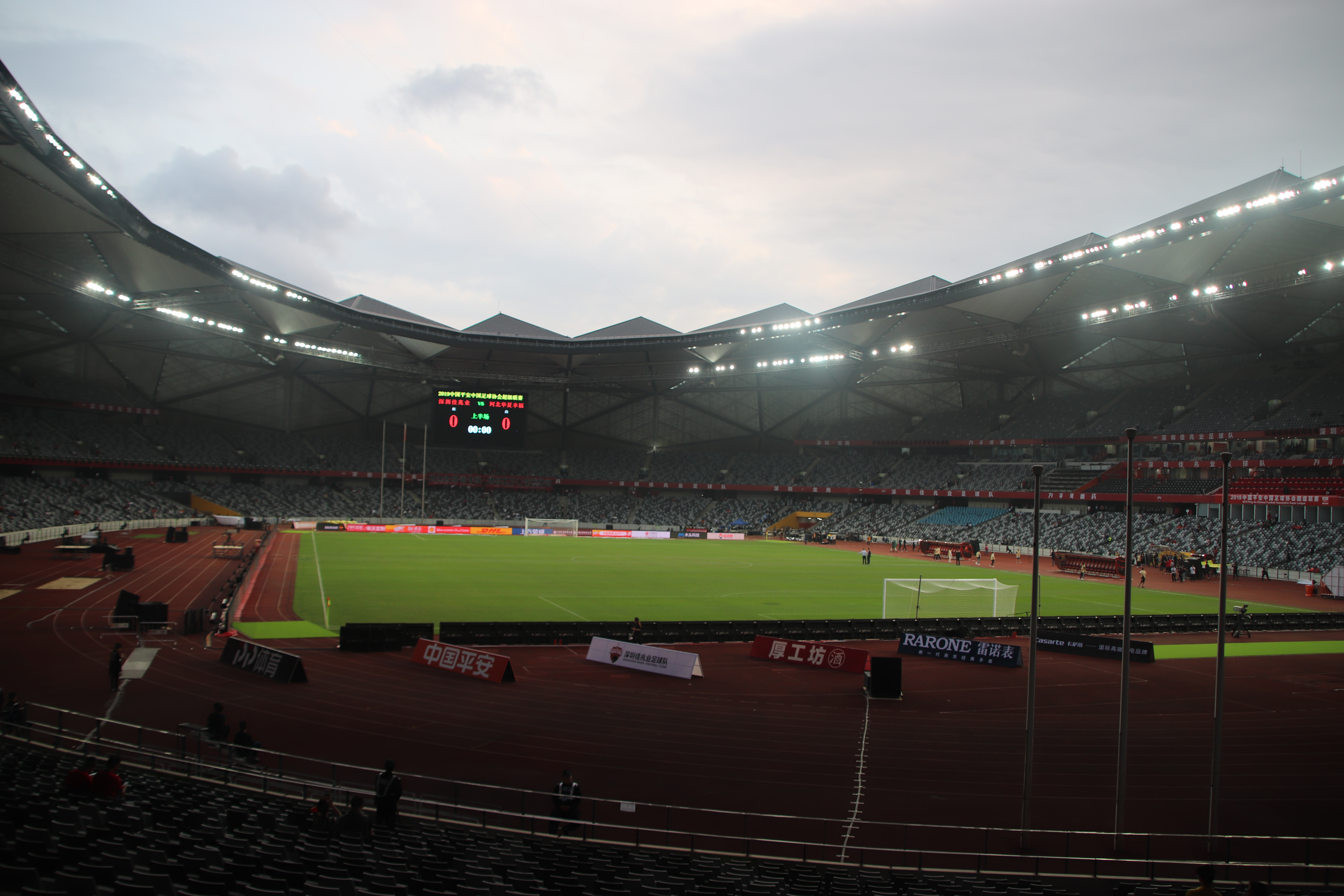
- The Shenzhen Universiade Sports Centre in Shenzhen hosted the match
- Event: Trophée des Champions
Paris Saint-Germain	Monaco
4	0
- Date: 4 August 2018
- Venue: Shenzhen Universiade Sports Centre, Shenzhen, China
- Man of the Match: Ángel Di María (Paris Saint-Germain)
- Referee: Ruddy Buquet
- Attendance: 41,237

The 2018 Trophée des Champions (transl. 2018 Champions Trophy) was the 23rd edition of the French super cup. The match was contested by the 2017–18 Ligue 1 and Coupe de France champions Paris Saint-Germain, and the runners-up of Ligue 1, Monaco. The match was played at the Shenzhen Universiade Sports Centre in Shenzhen, China.

The match was a rematch of the previous edition, in which PSG defeated Monaco 2–1.

Paris Saint-Germain won the match 4–0 for their sixth consecutive and eighth overall Trophée des Champions title.

== Match ==
=== Details ===
4 August 2018
20:00 CST

Paris Saint-Germain	4–0	Monaco
Di María 32', 90+2'; Nkunku 39'; Weah 67'	Report

Shenzhen Universiade Sports Centre, Shenzhen
Attendance: 41,237
Referee: Ruddy Buquet

Paris Saint-Germain	Monaco

GK	1	(Italy) Gianluigi Buffon
CB	19	(France) Lassana Diarra	(substituted off) 64'
CB	2	(Brazil) Thiago Silva (c)	(substituted off) 74'
CB	37	(French Guiana) Kévin Rimane
RM	34	(France) Colin Dagba
CM	25	(France) Adrien Rabiot
CM	6	(Italy) Marco Verratti	(substituted off) 75'
LM	36	(France) Stanley N'Soki
RW	24	(France) Christopher Nkunku
CF	21	(United States) Timothy Weah
LW	11	(Argentina) Ángel Di María
Substitutes:
GK	30	(Germany) Kevin Trapp
DF	5	(Brazil) Marquinhos	(substituted on) 64'
DF	20	(France) Layvin Kurzawa
MF	18	(Argentina) Giovani Lo Celso
MF	33	(France) Antoine Bernède	(substituted on) 74'
MF	35	(France) Moussa Diaby
FW	10	(Brazil) Neymar	(substituted on) 75'
Manager:
(Germany) Thomas Tuchel

GK	16	(Switzerland) Diego Benaglio
RB	24	(Italy) Andrea Raggi (c)	(yellow card) 90+2'
CB	25	(Poland) Kamil Glik
CB	5	(Brazil) Jemerson	(yellow card) 5'
LB	21	(France) Julien Serrano
CM	8	(Belgium) Youri Tielemans
CM	4	(Ivory Coast) Jean-Eudes Aholou
CM	28	(Guinea-Bissau) Pelé		(substituted off) 46'
RW	20	(Portugal) Rony Lopes		(substituted off) 64'
CF	10	(Montenegro) Stevan Jovetić
LW	29	(France) Samuel Grandsir		(substituted off) 46'
Substitutes:
GK	30	(Senegal) Seydou Sy
DF	3	(Italy) Antonio Barreca
DF	18	(France) Ronaël Pierre-Gabriel
MF	35	(France) Kévin N'Doram
MF	36	(France) Sofiane Diop		(substituted on) 46'
FW	14	(Senegal) Keita Baldé		(substituted on) 46'
FW	22	(Spain) Jordi Mboula		(substituted on) 64'
Manager:
(Portugal) Leonardo Jardim

Man of the Match:
Ángel Di María (Paris Saint-Germain)

Assistant referees:
Guillaume Debart
Julien Pacelli
Fourth official:
Jérôme Miguelgorry

Match rules

- 90 minutes.
- Penalty shoot-out if scores level.
- Seven named substitutes, of which up to three may be used.

== See also ==
- 2018–19 Ligue 1
- 2018–19 Coupe de France
- 2018–19 AS Monaco FC season
- 2018–19 Paris Saint-Germain FC season
