= Gouano =

Gouano is a surname. Notable people with the surname include:

- Gobé Gouano (born 2000), French footballer
- Prince-Désir Gouano (born 1993), French footballer
