= Jordi Mboula =

Spanish footballer (born 1999)

Personal information
- Full name: Jordi Mboula Queralt
- Date of birth: 16 March 1999 (age 27)
- Place of birth: Granollers, Spain
- Height: 1.83 m (6 ft 0 in)
- Position: Right winger

Team information
- Current team: A.E. Kifisia
- Number: 11

Youth career
- 2008–2009: Ametlla
- 2009–2010: Granollers
- 2010–2017: Barcelona

Senior career*
Years	Team	Apps	(Gls)
2016–2017	Barcelona B	3	(0)
2017–2019	Monaco B	16	(2)
2017–2020	Monaco	10	(1)
2019–2020	→ Cercle Brugge (loan)	7	(0)
2020	→ Huesca (loan)	9	(0)
2020–2023	Mallorca	40	(1)
2022	→ Estoril (loan)	13	(1)
2022–2023	→ Racing Santander (loan)	35	(6)
2023–2024	Hellas Verona	11	(0)
2024	→ Racing Santander (loan)	18	(2)
2024–2025	Gil Vicente	24	(0)
2025–2026	Cultural Leonesa	12	(0)
2026	Henan FC	11	(1)
2026–	A.E. Kifisia	5	(1)

International career^{‡}
2014–2015	Spain U16	5	(0)
2015–2016	Spain U17	16	(4)
2016–2018	Spain U19	14	(6)
2026–	Congo	2	(0)
Medal record
Men's football
Representing Spain
UEFA European Under-17 Championship
Runner-up	2016 Azerbaijan
- * Club domestic league appearances and goals as of 1 November 2026 ‡ National team caps and goals as of 17 November 2026

Jordi Mboula Queralt (born 16 March 1999) is a professional footballer who plays as right winger for Super League Greece club A.E. Kifisia. Born in Spain, he represents the Congo national team.

== Club career ==
=== Early career ===
Born in Granollers, Barcelona, Catalonia, to a Congolese father and a Spanish mother, Mboula's parents met in China, and he spent two years of his youth there. At the age of 9, Mboula begun playing football with his local club CF Ametlla for six months, before joining EC Granollers for a year, and finally moving to FC Barcelona.

=== Monaco ===
A member of Barcelona's youth academy, La Masia, Mboula joined AS Monaco FC on 21 July 2017, keeping him at the club until 2022. He made his professional debut for Monaco in a 0–0 Ligue 1 draw at home to Amiens SC on 28 April 2018, coming on as a substitute for Rony Lopes for the final six minutes. On 19 May, in the last game of the season, he replaced the same player in added time and scored his first goal in a 3–0 win at relegated Troyes AC.

On 15 July 2019, Mboula was loaned to Belgian side Cercle Brugge K.S.V. for one year. The following 29 January, he returned to Spain after agreeing to a six-month deal with SD Huesca in Segunda División.

=== Mallorca ===
On 17 September 2020, Mboula signed a four-year contract with RCD Mallorca, recently relegated to the second division. He featured regularly in his first season as the club returned to the top tier at first attempt, and made his debut in the category on 14 August 2021, starting in a 1–1 home draw against Real Betis.

On 31 January 2022, Mboula moved to Primeira Liga side Estoril on loan until June. On 24 August, he moved to Racing de Santander in the second division, in a temporary one-year deal.

Upon returning to Mallorca, Mboula rescinded his contract on 11 July 2023.

=== Hellas Verona ===
On 11 July 2023, Serie A side Hellas Verona announced the signing of Mboula on a four-year contract. On 12 August 2023, he made his debut for the club in a Coppa Italia match against Ascoli.

=== Return to Racing Santander ===
On 1 February 2024, Mboula returned to Racing Santander and signed a contract for the remainder of the 2023–24 season. Although the club announced the signing as a free transfer, Mboula returned to Hellas Verona at the end of the season. Other reports suggested the deal was a loan with a conditional obligation to make the transfer permanent if Racing achieved promotion to La Liga, which ultimately did not occur.

=== Gil Vicente ===
On 17 August 2024, Mboula signed a two-year contract with Portuguese Primeira Liga club Gil Vicente. As part of the agreement, Hellas Verona retained 25% of the rights to any future transfer fee.

On 23 July 2025, Mboula terminated his contract with the club.

=== Cultural Leonesa ===
On 2 September 2025, Mboula returned to Spain and joined Cultural y Deportiva Leonesa in the second division, signing a one-year deal with an option for an additional year.

=== Henan FC ===
On 23 January 2026, Cultural Leonesa announced Mboula's departure. He transferred to Chinese Super League club Henan FC. On 2 July 2026, he was released by the club after 6 months.

=== A.E. Kifisia ===
On 17 July 2026, Mboula joined Super League Greece club A.E. Kifisia.

== International career ==
Mboula was part of the Spain national under-17 football team that were runners-up at the 2016 UEFA European Under-17 Championship in Azerbaijan. He scored in their 2–0 opening win against the Netherlands.

On 31 August 2018, Junior was first called up to the Spain under-21 team for two 2019 UEFA European Under-21 Championship qualifying matches against Albania and Northern Ireland.

After switching allegiance to Congo, Mboula made his debut for the Congo national team on 13 November 2026 in an AFCON qualifier against the Comoros.

== Career statistics ==
As of match played 14 December 2024

Appearances and goals by club, season and competition
Club	Season	League			National Cup		Continental		Other		Total	
Club	Season	Division	Apps	Goals	Apps	Goals	Apps	Goals	Apps	Goals	Apps	Goals
Barcelona B	2016–17	Segunda División B	3	0	—		—		—		3	0
Monaco B	2017–18	Championnat National 2	9	1	—		—		—		9	1
Monaco B	2018–19	Championnat National 2	7	1	—		—		—		7	1
Monaco B	Total		16	2	—		—		—		16	2
Monaco	2017–18	Ligue 1	3	1	0	0	—		—		3	1
Monaco	2018–19	Ligue 1	7	0	0	0	1 (Note: Appearance(s) in UEFA Champions League)	0	1 (Note: Appearance(s) in Trophée des Champions)	0	9	0
Monaco	Total		10	1	0	0	1	0	1	0	12	1
Cercle Brugge (loan)	2019–20	Belgian First Division A	7	0	1	0	—		—		8	0
Huesca (loan)	2019–20	Segunda División	9	0	—		—		—		9	0
Mallorca	2020–21	Segunda División	29	1	0	0	—		—		29	1
Mallorca	2021–22	La Liga	11	0	3	1	—		—		14	2
Mallorca	Total		40	1	3	1	—		—		43	2
Estoril (loan)	2021–22	Primeira Liga	13	1	—		—		—		13	1
Racing Santander (loan)	2022–23	Segunda División	35	6	1	0	—		—		36	6
Hellas Verona	2023–24	Serie A	11	0	2	1	—		—		13	1
Racing Santander (loan)	2023–24	Segunda División	18	2	0	0	—		—		18	2
Gil Vicente	2024–25	Primeira Liga	11	0	2	1	—		—		13	1
Career total			173	13	9	3	1	0	1	0	184	16

== Honours ==
Monaco

- Coupe de la Ligue runner-up: 2017–18
- Trophée des Champions runner-up: 2018

Spain U17

- UEFA European Under-17 Championship runner-up: 2016
