= 2024–25 Alanyaspor season =

Alanyaspor
2024–25 season
- Manager: Fatih Tekke (until 7 November); Sami Uğurlu (15 November–20 March)
- Stadium: Alanya Oba Stadium
- Süper Lig: Pre-season
- Turkish Cup: Pre-season
- Average home league attendance: 3,852

The 2024–25 season is the 77th season in the history of Alanyaspor, and the club's ninth consecutive season in Süper Lig. In addition to the domestic league, the team is scheduled to participate in the Turkish Cup.

== Transfers ==
=== In ===
| Pos. | Player | Transferred from | Fee | Date | Source |
|---|---|---|---|---|---|
| GK | (Turkey) Mert Furkan Bayram | (Turkey) Altınordu | Undisclosed | 19 July 2024 | |
| FW | (Turkey) Bera Çeken | (Germany) SV Sandhausen | Free | 23 July 2024 | |
| FW | (Turkey) Serdar Dursun | (Turkey) Fatih Karagümrük | Free | 24 July 2024 | |
| MF | (Republic of the Congo) Gaius Makouta | (Portugal) Boavista | Free | 25 July 2024 | |
| MF | (Portugal) Rony Lopes | (Portugal) Braga | Free | 16 August 2024 | |

=== Out ===
| Pos. | Player | Transferred to | Fee | Date | Source |
|---|---|---|---|---|---|
| FW | (Turkey) Onur Demir | (Netherlands) Fortuna Sittard | | 10 July 2024 | |
| FW | (Brazil) Anderson Silva | (Cyprus) Pafos FC | Loan | 13 July 2024 | |
| MF | (Turkey) Oğuz Aydın | (Turkey) Fenerbahçe | €6,000,000 | 15 July 2024 | |
| MF | (Brazil) Carlos Eduardo | (Brazil) Vitória | Undisclosed | 23 July 2024 | |
| MF | (Denmark) Pione Sisto | (Greece) Aris Thessaloniki | Undisclosed | 23 July 2024 | |

== Friendlies ==
=== Pre-season ===
| 13 July 2024 Friendly | Neftçi PFK (Azerbaijan) | 3–1 | (Turkey) Alanyaspor | Erzurum |
| | | | Veysel Karani Ünal 51' |

| 16 July 2024 Friendly | Alanyaspor (Turkey) | 1–1 | (Azerbaijan) Araz-Naxçıvan |
| | | Report |

== Competitions ==
=== Overall record ===
| Competition | First match | Last match | Starting round | Final position | Record | | | | | | | |
| Competition | First match | Last match | Starting round | Final position | Pld | W | D | L | GF | GA | GD | Win % |
|---|---|---|---|---|---|---|---|---|---|---|---|---|
| Süper Lig | 11 August 2024 | 31 May 2025 | Matchday 1 | 12th place | 36 | 12 | 9 | 15 | 43 | 50 | −7 | 33.33 |
| Turkish Cup | 4 December 2024 | 26 February 2025 | Fourth round | Group stage | 5 | 3 | 1 | 1 | 12 | 8 | +4 | 60.00 |
| Total | | | | | 41 | 15 | 10 | 16 | 55 | 58 | −3 | 36.59 |

Last updated: 11 August 2024
Source: Competitions

=== Süper Lig ===
==== League table ====
| Pos | Team | Pld | W | D | L | GF | GA | GD | Pts |
|---|---|---|---|---|---|---|---|---|---|
| 11 | Konyaspor | 36 | 13 | 7 | 16 | 45 | 50 | −5 | 46 |
| 12 | Gaziantep | 36 | 12 | 9 | 15 | 45 | 50 | −5 | 45 |
| 13 | Alanyaspor | 36 | 12 | 9 | 15 | 43 | 50 | −7 | 45 |
| 14 | Kayserispor | 36 | 11 | 12 | 13 | 45 | 57 | −12 | 45 |
| 15 | Antalyaspor | 36 | 12 | 8 | 16 | 37 | 62 | −25 | 44 |

Source: Süper Lig
Rules for classification: 1) Points; 2) Head-to-head points; 3) Head-to-head goal difference; 4) Head-to-head goals scored; 5) Goal difference; 6) Goals scored; 7) Play-off.
(Note: Head-to-head record is used only after all the matches between the teams in question have been played)

==== Results summary ====
| Overall | | | | | | | | Home | | | | | | Away | | | | | |
| Pld | W | D | L | GF | GA | GD | Pts | W | D | L | GF | GA | GD | W | D | L | GF | GA | GD |
|---|---|---|---|---|---|---|---|---|---|---|---|---|---|---|---|---|---|---|---|
| 1 | 0 | 1 | 0 | 1 | 1 | 0 | 1 | 0 | 1 | 0 | 1 | 1 | 0 | 0 | 0 | 0 | 0 | 0 | 0 |

Last updated: 11 August 2024.
Source: Süper Lig

==== Results by round ====
| Round | 1 | 2 | 3 | 4 | 5 | 6 | 7 |
|---|---|---|---|---|---|---|---|
| Ground | H | A | H | A | H | A | H |
| Result | D | L | D | L | D | W | |
| Position | 6 | 15 | 16 | 17 | 16 | 12 | |

Updated to match(es) played on 22 September 2024. Source: Süper Lig
A = Away; H = Home; W = Win; D = Draw; L = Loss

==== Matches ====
The match schedule was released on 11 July 2024.

| 11 August 2024 1 | Alanyaspor | 1–1 | Eyüpspor | Alanya |
| 21:45 | | | | Stadium: Alanya Oba Stadium; Referee: Oğuzhan Çakır |

| 18 August 2024 2 | Başakşehir | 4–2 | Alanyaspor | Başakşehir |
| 19:15 | | | | Stadium: Başakşehir Fatih Terim Stadium |

| 22 September 2024 6 | Adana Demispor | 0–2 | Alanyaspor | Adana |
| 20:00 |
