= Benoît Badiashile =

French footballer (born 2001)

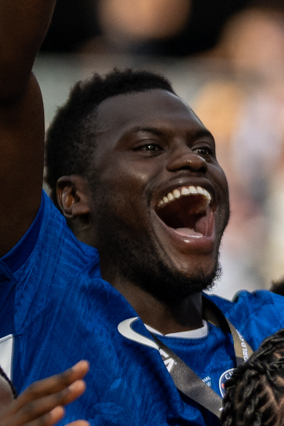
- Badiashile with Chelsea in 2025

Personal information
- Full name: Benoît Ntambue Badiashile Mukinayi Baya
- Date of birth: 26 March 2001 (age 25)
- Place of birth: Limoges, France
- Height: 1.94 m (6 ft 4 in)
- Position: Centre-back

Team information
- Current team: Napoli (on loan from Chelsea)
- Number: 5

Youth career
- 2007–2008: Limoges
- 2008–2016: Malesherbes
- 2016–2018: Monaco

Senior career*
Years	Team	Apps	(Gls)
2018–2019	Monaco II	12	(0)
2018–2023	Monaco	106	(6)
2023–	Chelsea	42	(1)
2026–	→ Napoli (loan)	4	(0)

International career
2016	France U16	5	(0)
2017–2018	France U17	6	(0)
2018	France U18	2	(0)
2018–2019	France U19	18	(0)
2020–2023	France U21	19	(0)
2022	France	2	(0)
- * Club domestic league appearances and goals as of 23:24, 24 October 2026 (UTC)

Benoît Ntambue Badiashile Mukinayi Baya (born 26 March 2001) is a French professional footballer who plays as a centre-back for Serie A club Napoli, on loan from Premier League club Chelsea.

== Early life ==
Benoît Ntambue Badiashile Mukinayi Baya was born on 26 March 2001 in Limoges, Haute-Vienne and is of Congolese descent.

== Club career ==
=== Monaco ===
On 5 February 2018, Badiashile signed his first professional contract with Monaco. He made his professional debut on 11 November, in a 4–0 Ligue 1 loss to Paris Saint-Germain.

=== Chelsea ===
On 5 January 2023, Badiashile signed with Premier League club Chelsea on a seven-and-a-half-year contract for a transfer fee reported by The Guardian to be £32.7 million (€37 million). On 15 January 2023, Badiashile made his debut for Chelsea, starting against Crystal Palace in the Premier League. The French defender played the entire game and earned his new club a clean sheet as Chelsea won 1–0.

==== Loan to Napoli ====
On 22 August 2026, Badiashile joined Serie A club Napoli on a season-long loan, with an option to make the move permanent.

== International career ==
Badiashile is a senior international for France, having been a part various under-16 to under-21 teams since 2016.

Badiashile received his first call-up to the France national team for two UEFA Nations League matches against Austria and Denmark in September 2022.

== Personal life ==
Badiashile is the younger brother of Loïc Badiashile, who is also a professional footballer.

== Career statistics ==
=== Club ===
As of match played 24 October 2026

Appearances and goals by club, season and competition
Club	Season	League			National cup (Note: Includes Coupe de France, FA Cup, Coppa Italia)		League cup (Note: Includes Coupe de la Ligue, EFL Cup)		Europe		Other		Total	
Club	Season	Division	Apps	Goals	Apps	Goals	Apps	Goals	Apps	Goals	Apps	Goals	Apps	Goals
Monaco II	2017–18	National 2	3	0	—		—		—		—		3	0
Monaco II	2018–19	National 2	9	0	—		—		—		—		9	0
Monaco II	Total		12	0	—		—		—		—		12	0
Monaco	2018–19	Ligue 1	20	1	1	0	3	0	2 (Note: Appearances in UEFA Champions League)	0	0	0	26	1
Monaco	2019–20	Ligue 1	16	0	2	0	2	0	—		—		20	0
Monaco	2020–21	Ligue 1	35	2	4	0	—		—		—		39	2
Monaco	2021–22	Ligue 1	24	1	0	0	—		10 (Note: Four appearances in UEFA Champions League, six appearances in UEFA Europa League)	0	—		34	1
Monaco	2022–23	Ligue 1	11	2	0	0	—		5 (Note: Appearances in UEFA Europa League)	0	—		16	2
Monaco	Total		106	6	7	0	5	0	17	0	—		135	6
Chelsea	2022–23	Premier League	11	1	0	0	—		—		—		11	1
Chelsea	2023–24	Premier League	18	0	2	0	2	1	—		—		22	1
Chelsea	2024–25	Premier League	5	0	0	0	2	0	13 (Note: Appearances in UEFA Conference League)	0	2 (Note: Appearances in FIFA Club World Cup)	0	22	0
Chelsea	2025–26	Premier League	8	0	2	0	2	0	4	0	—		16	0
Chelsea	Total		42	1	4	0	6	1	17	0	2	0	71	2
Napoli (loan)	2026–27	Serie A	4	0	0	0	—		1	0	—		5	0
Career total			164	7	11	0	11	1	35	0	2	0	223	8

=== International ===
Appearances and goals by national team and year
National team	Year	Apps	Goals
France	2022	2	0
Total		2	0

== Honours ==
Chelsea

- UEFA Conference League: 2024–25
- FIFA Club World Cup: 2025
- FA Cup runner-up: 2025–26

Individual

- IFFHS Men's Youth (U20) World Team: 2021
