= William Vainqueur =

French footballer (born 1988)

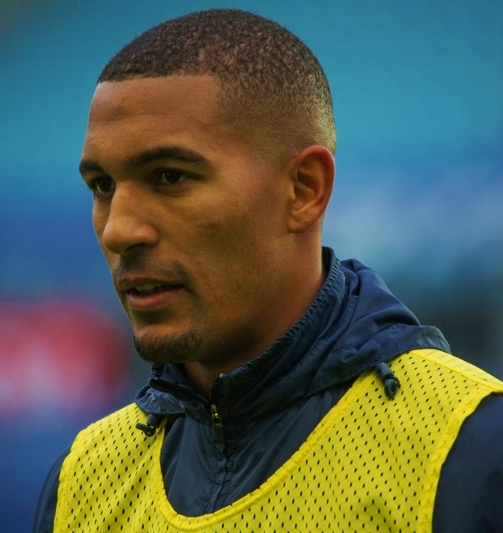
- Vainqueur warming up for Dynamo Moscow in 2015.

Personal information
- Full name: William Jacques Vainqueur
- Date of birth: 19 November 1988 (age 37)
- Place of birth: Neuilly-sur-Marne, France
- Height: 1.79 m (5 ft 10 in)
- Position: Midfielder

Youth career
- 2002–2006: Nantes

Senior career*
Years	Team	Apps	(Gls)
2006–2011	Nantes	92	(1)
2011–2014	Standard Liège	89	(5)
2014–2015	Dynamo Moscow	28	(2)
2015–2017	Roma	16	(0)
2016–2017	→ Marseille (loan)	29	(0)
2017–2020	Antalyaspor	26	(0)
2019	→ Monaco (loan)	3	(0)
2019–2020	→ Toulouse (loan)	21	(0)

International career
2007	France U19	1	(0)
2009	France U21	1	(0)
- * Club domestic league appearances and goals

William Jacques Vainqueur (born 19 November 1988) is a French former professional footballer who played as a midfielder. He mostly played as a central or defensive midfielder position.

== Club career ==
=== FC Nantes ===
Born in Neuilly-sur-Marne, a commune in the eastern suburbs of Paris, Vainqueur joined Noisy-le-Grand FC at the age of 8. In 2001, he moved to the youth system of AJ Auxerre and spent one year there, before being released. After his release by Auxerre, Vainqueur continued to train, to work on himself, leading to re–join Bussy-Saint-Georges FC. There, he was discovered at the age 14 by FC Nantes's scout team. However, moving to Nantes in Pays de la Loire saw Vainqueur move away, as he saw his family once every month.

Having progressed through the youth system at Nantes, Vainqueur made his senior debut during the 2006–07 Ligue 1 season, where he started the match before coming off in the 69th minute for Miloš Dimitrijević, in a 0–0 draw against Olympique de Marseille on 18 February 2007. Vainqueur soon become involved in a number of matches following an absent of Alioum Saidou, though he faced setback with injury. However, the club were eventually relegated to Ligue 2 at the end of the season after losing 1–0 against Bordeaux on 9 May 2007. At the end of the 2006–07 season, Vainqueur went on to make ten appearances for FC Nantes. Shortly after, he signed his first professional contract with the Ligue 1 club shortly.

However, ahead of the 2007–08 season, Vainqueur was out for six months after rupturing his cruciate ligaments on his right knee while on duty for France U19. By January, he returned to training after being on the sidelines. However, he suffered another injury with a broken cruciate ligament. On 10 March 2008, Vainqueur made his first appearance of the season, coming on as a substitute, in a 1–0 win over Grenoble Foot. He went on to make five appearances in the 2007–08 season, as FC Nantes were promoted back to Ligue 1 at the first attempt.

Vainqueur had to wait until 20 September 2008 to make his first appearance of the 2008–09 season, coming on as a substitute, in a 2–0 win over Valenciennes. However, he struggled for most of the season on the substitute bench, as well as, his own injury concerns. By the second half of the season, Vainqueur soon regained his first team place, in the defensive midfield position. He later faced further absence later in the 2008–09 season that saw FC Nantes were relegated back to Ligue 2 after finishing 19th on the table. At the end of the 2008–09 season, Vainqueur went on to make eighteen appearances in all competitions.

In the 2009–10 season, Vainqueur began to feature more in the first team and started in a number of matches. However, he was sent–off for a second bookable offence, in a 5–0 win over FC Istres on 21 August 2009. After serving a two match suspension, Vainqueur returned to the first team on 18 September 2009, in a 1–1 draw against SC Bastia. On 1 October 2009, he signed a contract with FC Nantes, keeping him until 2013. Three weeks later on 23 October 2009, Vainqueur scored his first goal for the club, in a 2–1 win over Dijon FCO. However, he was out on four more occasions later in the 2009–10 season. Despite this, this did not affect Vainqueur's place in the first team, as he remained on the first team spotlight throughout the 2009–10 season. At the end of the 2009–10 season, Vainqueur went on to make twenty–nine appearances and scoring once in all competitions.

After missing the start of the 2010–11 season, due to injury, Vainqueur made his first appearance of the season, starting the whole game, in a 2–0 loss against Le Mans in the opening game of the season. Shortly after, he suffered a thigh strain that saw him miss two matches. Vainqueur returned to the first team on 20 September 2010, where he started and played 58 minutes, in a 2–1 loss against Reims. In a match against Le Havre on 10 December 2010, he was involved in a goal that led to opposition player Loïc Nestor scoring an own goal, which was the only goal of the game. A month later on 29 January 2011, Vainqueur was sent-off in the 62nd minute for a professional foul, in a 3–0 loss against Évian Thonon Gaillard. Despite being on the sidelines over injuries and suspensions, he continued to remain in the first team for the remainder of the season. At the end of the season, he went on to make twenty–nine appearances in all competitions.

In the 2011–12 season, Vainqueur continued to feature in the first team for Nantes and appeared in every match by the end of August.

=== Standard Liège ===
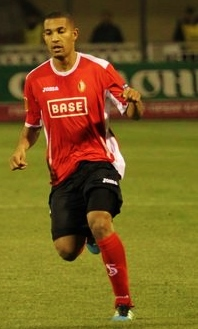
Vainqueur playing for Standard Liège against Vorskla Poltava during his time at the club.

On 30 August 2011, Vainqueur was transferred to Belgian Pro League side Standard Liège, signing a five-year contract with the Belgian club. The transfer move reportedly cost 1.7 million euros. He was previously linked a move to clubs, such as, Olympiacos, AS Nancy and FC Lorient before he joined Standard Liège.

After starting out on the substitute bench, Vainqueur made his Standard Liège debut on 15 September 2011, starting the whole game, in a 0–0 against Hannover 96 in the UEFA Europa League Group Stage. Three days later, on 17 September 2011, he made his league debut for the club, starting the whole game, in a 3–0 loss against Genk. Since joining Standard Liège, he quickly established himself in the starting eleven, playing in the defensive–midfield position. In the second–leg of the quarter–finals of Belgian Cup against Lierse, Vainqueur scored his first goal for the club, in a 4–2 loss, as Standard Liège were unable to overturn the deficit, losing 5–4 on aggregate. However, he was sent–off for a second bookable offence, in a 2–0 win over Lierse on 4 February 2012, resulting a one–man ban. His performance saw Vainqueur being named Nieuwsblad's Team of the Season in March 2012. Despite missing several matches during the 2011–12 season, he finished his first season at Standard Liège, making thirty–five appearances and scoring once in all competitions.

In the 2012–13 season, Vainqueur continued to remain in the first team, playing out in the defensive midfield position at the start of the season. On 4 November 2012, he scored his first goal of the season, in a 2–0 win over OH Leuven. His performance attracted interest from Premier League side Fulham, who wanted to sign him. Despite the transfer speculation, Vainqueur scored two goals in two matches on 2 December 2012 and 7 December 2012 against Waasland-Beveren and Charleroi. In a 0–0 draw against Gent, he was sent–off for a second bookable offence, resulting a one match ban. On 12 April 2013, Vainqueur scored his fourth goal of the season, in a 4–3 win over Zulte Waregem. After the match, his goal against Zulte Waregem was voted number for the Goal of the Week by newspaper Nieuwsblad following a vote. Towards the end of the 2012–13 season, he was given a captaincy, including a 7–0 win over Gent on 26 May 2013 to help the club qualify for the Europa League next season. Having played down claims that Standard Liege would not win the league (which Vainqueur was correct), the club went on to finish fourth place. He was also nominated for the player of the Year in Belgium but lost out to Club Brugge's Carlos Bacca. Despite being sidelined during the 2012–13 season, Vainqueur went on to make thirty–nine appearances and scoring four times in all competitions.

Ahead of the 2013–14 season, Vainqueur spoken out that he wanted to leave Standard Liège, citing delays of contract negotiations. This led interests from foreign clubs, including rivals, Anderlecht. Vainqueur was considering having his contract with Standard Liège terminated by using a law of 78. In an unexpected turn of an event, he made a U-turn by signing a new contract, keeping him until 2016. Vainqueur made his first appearance of the season, where he started and played 73 minutes, in a 3–1 win over KR Reykjavík in the first leg of UEFA Europa League Second Round. During the match, however, he suffered a thigh injury and was sidelined for several weeks. On 1 September 2013, Vainqueur returned to the first team from injury, in a 2–0 win over K.V. Kortrijk. After returning to the first team, he established himself in the starting eleven for the side. Vainqueur was then sent–off on 27 October 2013, in which he was involved an incident with Luka Milivojević, in a 1–1 draw against Anderlecht. After the match, the Disputes Committee of the KBVB decided not to take further action against Vainqueur and allowed him to play in the next match. After being suspended for one match, he scored on his return on 1 December 2013, in a 5–0 win over Lierse. However, near the end of a league game against Lierse, Vainqueur received a red card when he accidentally kicked an opponent in the face. During a 2–0 win over Oostende on 18 January 2014, Vainqueur made a tough tackle on Sébastien Siani but wasn't booked; after the match, the Disputes Committee of the KBVB, again, decided not charge any actions against him despite proof claims on television. After finishing second place in the league, he hinted about leaving the club in the summer of 2014. Despite being suspended on two occasions later in the 2013–14 season, Vainqueur continuously remained in the starting eleven for the side and went on to make thirty–six appearances and scoring once in all competitions. For his performance at the end of the 2013–14 season, he was awarded UGH Ecarlate trophy, a Player of the Year award voted for by Standard Liège fans.

=== Dynamo Moscow ===
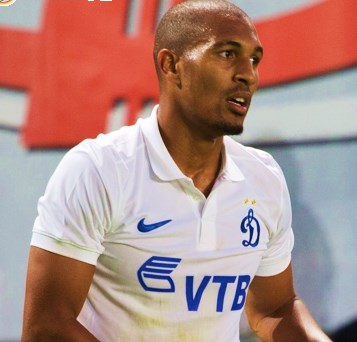
Vainqueur playing for Dynamo Moscow during a match against Hapoel Ironi Kiryat Shmona in the first leg of the UEFA Europa League third round.

On 27 June 2014, Dynamo Moscow announced signing Vainqueur on a long-term deal. Upon joining the club, he revealed that he consulted his former teammate Mehdi Carcela, who moved to Russia to play for Anzhi Makhachkala three years ago before returning to Standard Liège, about moving to Russia and insisted of not being afraid facing competitions at Dynamo Moscow.

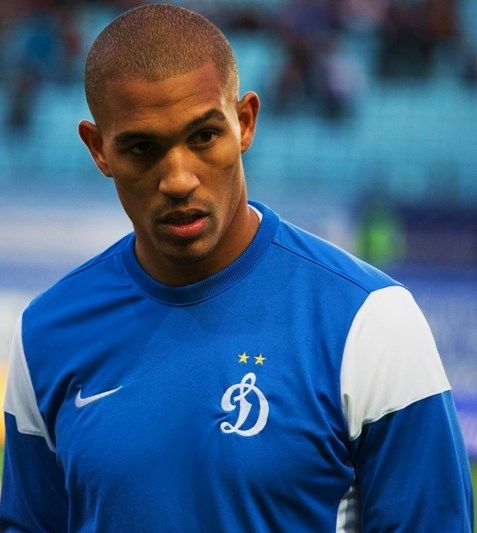
Vainqueur playing for Dynamo Moscow during a match against PSV Eindhoven on 2 October 2014.

Vainqueur made his Dynamo Moscow debut, starting the whole game, in a 1–1 draw against Hapoel Ironi Kiryat Shmona in the first leg of the UEFA Europa League third round. In the return leg, he started the whole game to help the club beat the opposition team 2–1 at away to advance to the next round. Vainqueur made his league debut for Dynamo Moscow, where he played 63 minutes before being substituted, in a 7–3 win over FC Rostov in the opening game of the season. Vainqueur played in both leg of the UEFA Europa League play–offs round against AC Omonia but he was sent–off in the second leg for second bookable offence, as the club went through by beating 4–3 on aggregate. Throughout the UEFA Europa League Group Stage, Vainqueur was featured five out of the six matches in the group stage to help Dynamo Moscow win all the matches to reach the knockout stage. On 4 April 2015, he scored his first goal for the club, in a 2–2 draw against Lokomotiv Moscow. A month later on 25 May 2015, Vainqueur scored his second goal of the season, in a 2–2 draw against Arsenal Tula. Throughout the 2014–15 season, he was a first team regular, playing in the defensive–midfield position and finished his first season at Dynamo Moscow, making forty–one appearances and scoring two times in all competitions. However, during the season, Vainqueur received criticism from Manager Stanislav Cherchesov for committing several fouls and received a warning as a result.

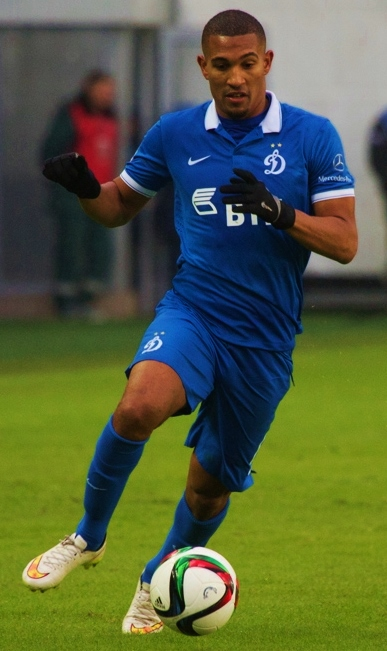
Vainqueuer playing for the side in a league match against FC Ufa on 9 March 2015.

However, in the 2015–16 season, Vainqueur made his only appearance for Dynamo Moscow, coming on as a substitute, against Mordovia Saransk on 25 July 2015. This was partly because he spent the number of matches on the substitute bench. Towards the end of August, his future at the club was in doubt following their expulsion from playing European Football this season. It came after when Dynamo Moscow was keen on selling him.

=== A.S. Roma ===
On 31 August 2015, Vainqueur moved to Serie A side Roma for an undisclosed fee. Upon joining the club, he became the tenth French player to join Roma and was given a number twenty–one shirt.

However, Vainqueur started off his Roma career on the substitute bench in a number of matches, due to strong competitions in the midfield positions, as well as, Rudi Garcia's formation. He made his debut for the club, coming on as a substitute for injured Seydou Keita in the 21st minute and went on to play the whole game, in a 5–1 win over Carpi on 26 September 2015. Vainqueur played a role when came on as a late substitute and set up a late goal, in a 2–0 win against Genoa on 20 December 2015. In a follow–up match against ChievoVerona on 6 January 2016, he set up another goal, in a 3–3 draw. For the rest of the 2015–16 season, Vainqueur continued remain out of the first team, due to being on the substitute bench, as well as, his own injury concerns. At the end of the 2015–16 season, he went on to make twenty–two appearances in all competitions for Roma.

Throughout the summer transfer window, with no first team appearances, Vainqueur was linked a move away from Roma, as clubs from Europe were interested in signing him. This also included his former club, Standard Liège.

==== Olympique de Marseille (loan) ====
On 31 August 2016, Vainqueur joined French club Marseille on a season-long loan deal. He revealed that he grew up supporting Olympique de Marseille as a young boy.

Vainqueur made his Olympique de Marseille debut, starting a match and played 68 minutes before being substituted, in a 3–2 loss against OGC Nice on 11 September 2016. Since joining the club, he quickly established himself in the first team, playing in the defensive–midfield position. However, in mid–October, Vainqueur suffered a hamstring injury that kept him out throughout the month. On 20 November 2016, he returned to the first team from injury, in a 1–0 win over SM Caen. Vainqueur then regained his first team place, where he resumed playing in the defensive midfield. In a match against Lille on 18 December 2016, he set up a goal for Florian Thauvin to score Olympique de Marseille's second goal of the game, in a 2–0 win. Despite missing two more matches later in the season, Vainqueur went on to make thirty–three appearances in all competitions.

Despite keen on joining the club on a permanent basis at the end of the 2016–17 season, Olympique de Marseille did not make a permanent offer on Vainqueur.

=== Antalyaspor ===
On 4 September 2017, Vainqueur moved to Süper Lig side Antalyaspor on a three-year contract. The move reported to have cost 500,000 euros. Upon joining the club, he was offered a chance to join Galatasaray but opted to join Antalyaspor. Vainqueur was also given a number nineteen shirt.

He made his debut for Antalyaspor, starting a match before coming off at half time, in a 2–0 win over Kayserispor on 15 September 2017. However, Vainqueur suffered two separate injuries between mid–October and early–November. As a result, he failed to make an impact for the club, having played 715 minutes in ten matches by the end of the year. While on the sidelines from injury, it was reported that his contract at Antalyaspor was then terminated on 31 January 2018. Unfortunately, he remained at the club after deciding against leaving Antalyaspor following some of his teammates left the club, as a result of their financial problems. Vainqueur made his return to the first team on 19 February 2018, coming on as a late substitute, in a 2–1 win over Kayserispor. However, towards the end of the 2017–18 season, he was sidelined on two separate occasions, due to suspension and injuries. He went on to make twenty appearances in all competitions at his first season at Antalyaspor.

Ahead of the 2018–19 season, it was reported that Vainqueur was released by Antalyaspor once again. However, he stayed at the club in the end. Nevertheless, Vainqueur was linked a move away from Antalyaspor. He made his three starts for the club in the first four league matches of the season. However, Vainqueur suffered an injury that saw him out for a month. On 30 October 2018, he made his return from injury, starting the whole game, in a 4–1 win against Yomraspor in the fourth round of the Türkiye Kupasi. His return was short–lived when Vainqueur suffered two separate occasions in the first half of the season. After leaving Antalyaspor, he made nine appearances in all competitions.

At the end of the 2019–20 season, Vainqueur was finally released by Antalyaspor. After leaving the club, he quietly announced his retirement from professional football.

==== Monaco (loan) ====
On 9 January 2019, Antalyaspor announced that Vainqueur joined Monaco on loan until the end of the 2018–19 season. It was initially a permanent transfer but it was cancelled in favour of a loan following a failed medical.

He made his debut for the club, coming on as a 67th-minute substitute, in a 2–0 loss against Dijon on 26 January 2019. However, Vainqueur received a straight red card in the 14th minute of the game for a "dangerous tackle" on Marcus Thuram, as AS Monaco went on lose on penalties following a 2–2 draw against Guingamp in the semi–finals of the Coupe de la Ligue. After serving his suspension, his return was short–lived when he suffered a calf injury once again. On 15 March 2019, Vainqueur returned from injury, coming on as a 79th-minute substitute, in a 1–0 win against LOSC Lille. However, his return was short–lived once again when he suffered an abductor injury that eventually kept him out for the rest of the season. At the end of the 2018–19 season, Vainqueur made four appearances in all competitions.

==== Toulouse (loan) ====
On 26 June 2019, Vainqueur joined Toulouse on loan until 30 June 2020.

He made his debut for the club, starting the match, in a 1–1 draw against Stade Brestois in the opening game of the season. Since joining Toulouse, Vainqueur became a first team regular, playing in the defensive midfield position. However, he was out on three separate occasions, due to being dropped from the squad over fitness concern. The season ended abruptly, due to the COVID-19 pandemic. At the end of the 2019–20 season, Vainqueur made twenty–one appearances in all competitions. Following this, his loan spell at the club came to an end.

== International career ==
Vainqueur is eligible to play for either France and Haiti. It was made clear that Vainqueur was interested playing for France, but was never called up.

=== Youth career ===
Vainquerer made his first called up in April 2007 for the France U19 for a match against Congo U19. However, his appearance in a 5–2 win over Serbia U19 on 16 July 2007 saw him played 28 minutes after rupturing his cruciate ligaments on his right knee. He went on to make three appearances for the France U19 side.

In March 2009, Vainqueur was called up to the France U21 squad. He made his France U21 debut on 27 March 2009, where he started the match, in a 3–0 win over Estonia U21.

== Personal life ==
Vainqueur is of Haitian descent. Growing up, he revealed that he spent his holidays, going to Haiti. Growing up in Neuilly-sur-Marne, a commune in the eastern suburbs of Paris, Vainqueur revealed that he grew in dangerous part of Neuilly-sur-Marne and saw his friends doing drugs or ended up in hospital. He has stated that if he didn't made it as a footballer, he wanted it to become an architect and designer.

Vainqueur is Muslim. He speaks French and English. In September 2008, Vainqueur became a father for the first time, when his girlfriend gave birth to a baby girl, Kayci. Six years later, he became a father for a second time with a baby boy, Kayes. His father-in-law is Abdoulaye Ka.

During his time at Dynamo Moscow, Igor Tsarush, commenting on racism in Russia, said that "Somehow Vainqueur asked why there are so few black people on the streets? I explained to him that when France conquered the colonies, it did it in Africa. That Russia had union republics, and we have more residents from there." Commenting on Moscow in July 2015, Vainqueur said: "Moscow is not at all what exists in the stereotypes of many Europeans. It is commonly believed that this is an old city, cold, somewhat archaic. In any case, this image was formed before my first visit to Russia. As soon as I flew to Moscow, I realized what kind of nonsense this was."

On 23 February 2020, Vainqueur’s home was robbed whilst playing for Toulouse against LOSC Lille.
