= Samuel Grandsir =

French footballer (born 1996)

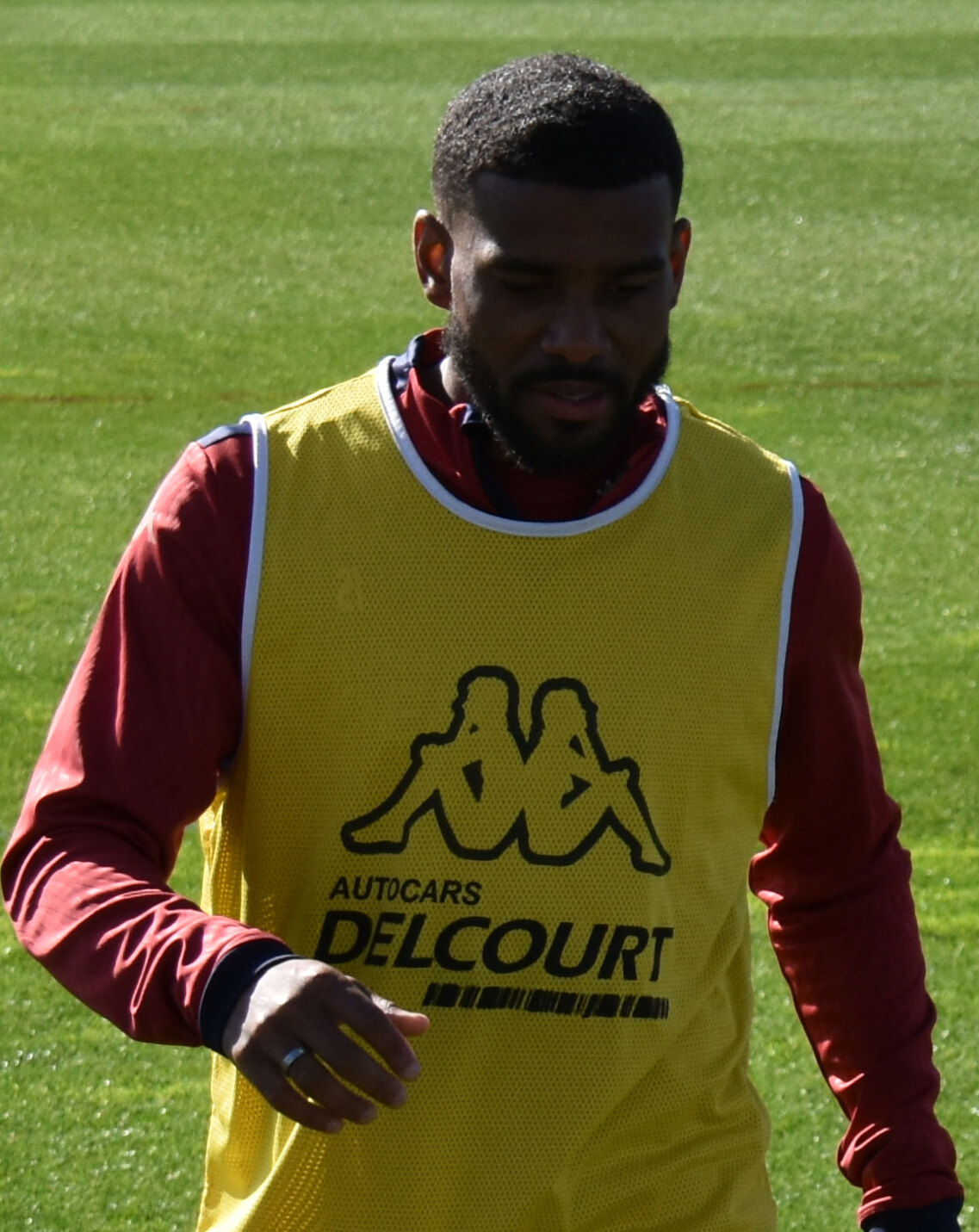
- Grandsir with Caen in 2025

Personal information
- Date of birth: 14 August 1996 (age 30)
- Place of birth: Évreux, France
- Height: 1.70 m (5 ft 7 in)
- Position: Winger

Team information
- Current team: Nea Salamina
- Number: 7

Youth career
- 2004–2009: Évreux AC
- 2009–2012: Évreux FC 27
- 2012–2016: Troyes

Senior career*
| Years | Team | Apps | (Gls) |
| 2013–2016 | Troyes B | 51 | (6) |
| 2016–2018 | Troyes | 82 | (6) |
| 2018–2021 | Monaco | 12 | (0) |
| 2019 | → Strasbourg (loan) | 8 | (0) |
| 2019–2020 | → Brest (loan) | 24 | (3) |
| 2021–2022 | LA Galaxy | 67 | (6) |
| 2023–2025 | Le Havre | 43 | (3) |
| 2025 | Caen | 9 | (1) |
| 2026– | Nea Salamina | 9 | (7) |

International career^{‡}
| 2017–2018 | France U21 | 4 | (0) |
- * Club domestic league appearances and goals as of 7 November 2026 ‡ National team caps and goals as of 29 July 2019

Samuel Grandsir (born 14 August 1996) is a French-Senegalese professional footballer who plays as a winger for Nea Salamina.

== Youth career ==
Grandsir started his youth career in his hometown, Évreux. He eventually moved to the youth team of Troyes.

== Club career ==
After spending time with the youth team and reserve team, Grandsir signed with the Troyes senior team in 2016.

Garnering attention from other clubs after several impressive seasons, he moved to Monaco for €5.250m in 2018. Grandsir went on loan from Monaco to Strasbourg in January 2019 followed by another loan to Brest for the 2019–20 season.

On 11 March 2021, Grandsir signed with Major League Soccer club LA Galaxy. On 23 January 2023, Grandsir returned to his native France to join Ligue 2 leaders Le Havre on a contract until the end of the season.

On 2 February 2025, Grandsir signed with Caen in Ligue 2.

== International career ==
Born in France, Grandsir holds French and Senegalese nationalities. He represented France at the youth international level.

== Career statistics ==
As of match played on 21 December 2024

Appearances and goals by club, season and competition
| Club | Season | League | | | National cup | | League cup | | Continental | | Other | | Total | |
| Club | Season | Division | Apps | Goals | Apps | Goals | Apps | Goals | Apps | Goals | Apps | Goals | Apps | Goals |
|---|---|---|---|---|---|---|---|---|---|---|---|---|---|---|
| Troyes B | 2013–14 | CFA 2 | 5 | 1 | — | | — | | — | | — | | 5 | 1 |
| Troyes B | 2014–15 | CFA | 20 | 2 | — | | — | | — | | — | | 20 | 2 |
| Troyes B | 2015–16 | CFA | 26 | 3 | — | | — | | — | | — | | 26 | 3 |
| Troyes B | Total | | 51 | 6 | 0 | 0 | 0 | 0 | 0 | 0 | 0 | 0 | 51 | 6 |
| Troyes | 2015–16 | Ligue 1 | 14 | 0 | 0 | 0 | 0 | 0 | — | | 0 | 0 | 14 | 0 |
| Troyes | 2016–17 | Ligue 2 | 32 | 3 | 2 | 1 | 1 (Note: Appearance(s) in the Coupe de la Ligue) | 0 | — | | 2 (Note: Appearances in the Ligue 1 relegation/promotion play-offs) | 0 | 37 | 4 |
| Troyes | 2017–18 | Ligue 1 | 36 | 3 | 3 | 0 | 1 | 0 | — | | 0 | 0 | 40 | 3 |
| Troyes | Total | | 82 | 6 | 5 | 1 | 2 | 0 | 0 | 0 | 2 | 0 | 91 | 7 |
| Monaco | 2018–19 | Ligue 1 | 12 | 0 | 1 | 0 | 1 | 0 | 3 (Note: Appearances in the UEFA Champions League) | 1 | 1 (Note: Appearance in the Trophée des Champions) | 0 | 18 | 1 |
| Monaco | 2020–21 | Ligue 1 | 0 | 0 | 0 | 0 | 0 | 0 | 0 | 0 | 0 | 0 | 0 | 0 |
| Monaco | Total | | 12 | 0 | 1 | 0 | 1 | 0 | 3 | 1 | 1 | 0 | 18 | 1 |
| Strasbourg (loan) | 2018–19 | Ligue 1 | 8 | 0 | 1 | 0 | 0 | 0 | — | | — | | 9 | 0 |
| Brest (loan) | 2019–20 | Ligue 1 | 24 | 3 | 1 | 0 | 2 | 2 | — | | — | | 27 | 5 |
| LA Galaxy | 2021 | MLS | 34 | 3 | 0 | 0 | 0 | 0 | — | | — | | 34 | 3 |
| LA Galaxy | 2022 | MLS | 33 | 3 | 4 | 0 | 2 (Note: Appearances in the MLS Cup Playoffs) | 1 | — | | — | | 39 | 4 |
| LA Galaxy | Total | | 67 | 6 | 4 | 0 | 2 | 1 | 0 | 0 | 0 | 0 | 73 | 7 |
| Le Havre | 2022–23 | Ligue 2 | 14 | 2 | 0 | 0 | — | | — | | — | | 14 | 2 |
| Le Havre | 2023–24 | Ligue 1 | 23 | 1 | 2 | 0 | — | | — | | — | | 25 | 1 |
| Le Havre | 2024–25 | Ligue 1 | 4 | 0 | 1 | 0 | — | | — | | — | | 5 | 0 |
| Le Havre | Total | | 41 | 3 | 3 | 0 | — | | — | | 0 | 0 | 44 | 3 |
| Career total | | | 285 | 24 | 15 | 1 | 7 | 3 | 3 | 1 | 3 | 0 | 313 | 29 |

== Honours ==
Strasbourg

- Coupe de la Ligue: 2018–19
