= Yoann Étienne =

Haitian professional footballer (born 1997)

Personal information
- Full name: Yoann Étienne
- Date of birth: 19 May 1997 (age 29)
- Place of birth: Paris, France
- Height: 1.78 m (5 ft 10 in)
- Position: Left-back

Team information
- Current team: Lorient
- Number: 31

Youth career
- 2014–2018: Monaco

Senior career*
Years	Team	Apps	(Gls)
2016–2020	Monaco B	51	(4)
2018–2020	Monaco	0	(0)
2018–2019	→ Cercle Brugge (loan)	31	(0)
2020–	Lorient B	1	(0)
2021–	Lorient	1	(0)
- * Club domestic league appearances and goals as of 20:26, 12 June 2021 (UTC)

Yoann Étienne (born 19 May 1997) is a French professional footballer who plays as a left-back for Lorient.

== Professional career ==
On 6 April 2018, Etienne signed his first professional contract with AS Monaco FC for three years. On 16 June 2018, he was loaned to Cercle Brugge for the 2018-19 season. Etienne made his professional debut in a 0-0 Belgian First Division A tie with Sint-Truiden on 28 July 2018. On 5 October 2021, he transferred to the Ligue 1 club Lorient.

== Personal life ==
Born in France, Etienne is of Haitian descent.
