= Rony Lopes =

Portuguese footballer (born 1995)

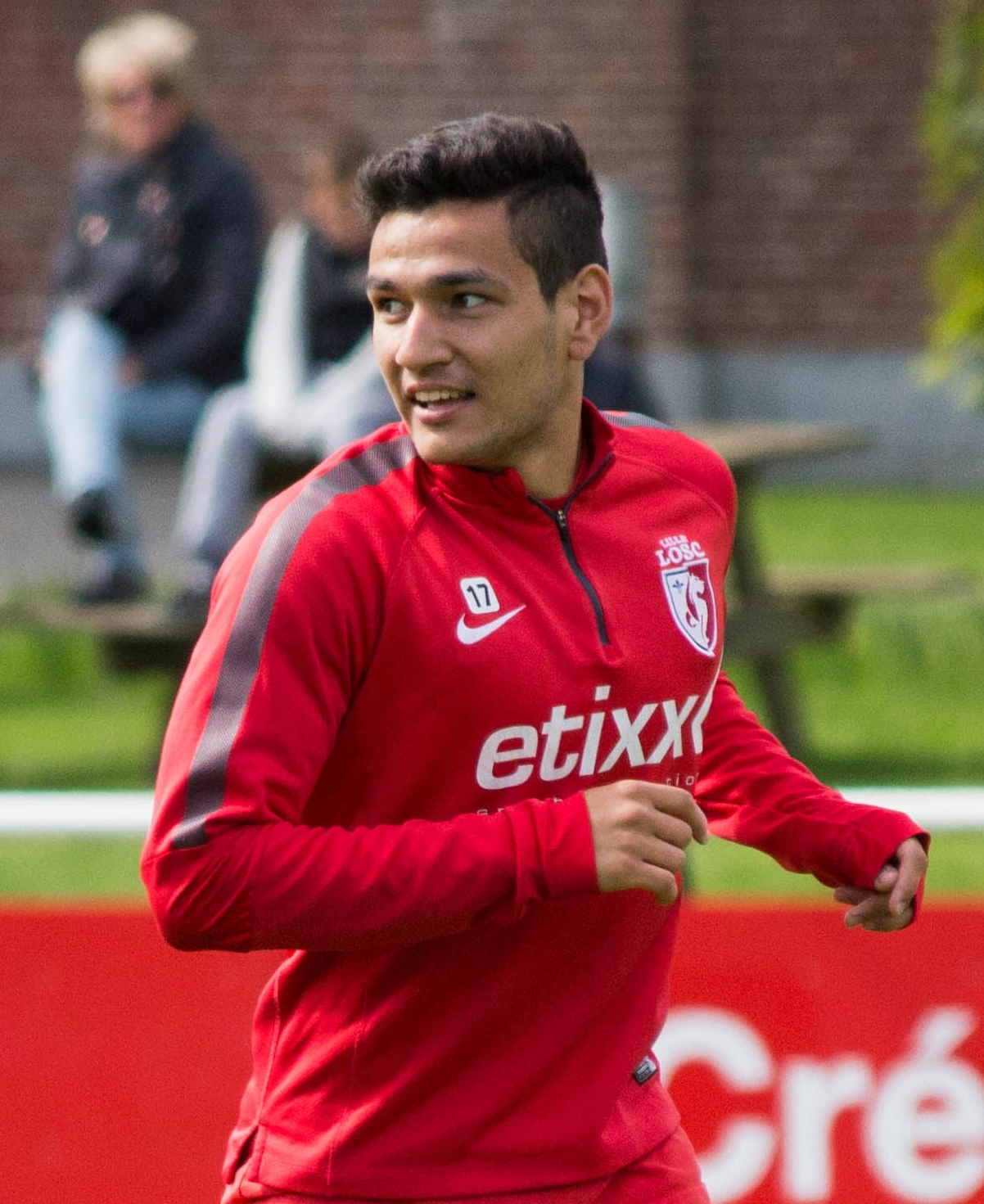
- Lopes training with Lille in 2015

Personal information
- Full name: Marcos Paulo Mesquita Lopes
- Date of birth: 28 December 1995 (age 30)
- Place of birth: Belém, Brazil
- Height: 1.74 m (5 ft 9 in)
- Positions: Attacking midfielder; winger

Team information
- Current team: Motor Lublin
- Number: 9

Youth career
- 2003–2006: AD Poiares
- 2006–2011: Benfica
- 2011–2013: Manchester City

Senior career*
Years	Team	Apps	(Gls)
2013–2015	Manchester City	0	(0)
2014–2015	→ Lille (loan)	23	(3)
2015–2019	Monaco	65	(17)
2015	Monaco B	1	(0)
2016–2017	→ Lille (loan)	37	(6)
2016	→ Lille B (loan)	1	(0)
2019–2023	Sevilla	5	(0)
2020–2021	→ Nice (loan)	28	(3)
2021–2022	→ Olympiacos (loan)	18	(3)
2022–2023	→ Troyes (loan)	32	(7)
2023–2024	Braga	23	(2)
2024–2025	Alanyaspor	15	(0)
2025	→ Farense (loan)	14	(1)
2025–2026	Tondela	16	(4)
2026–	Motor Lublin	6	(1)

International career
2010–2011	Portugal U16	8	(3)
2011–2012	Portugal U17	11	(1)
2012	Portugal U18	3	(1)
2012–2014	Portugal U19	24	(14)
2015	Portugal U20	7	(0)
2014–2017	Portugal U21	12	(1)
2017–2018	Portugal	2	(0)
Medal record
Men's football
Representing Portugal
UEFA European Under-19 Championship
Runner-up	2014 Hungary
- * Club domestic league appearances and goals as of 14:55, 31 October 2026 (UTC)

Marcos Paulo Mesquita "Rony" Lopes (born 28 December 1995) is a professional footballer who plays as an attacking midfielder or right winger for Ekstraklasa club Motor Lublin. Born in Brazil, he represented Portugal internationally.

== Early life ==
Born in Belém, Pará, Brazil to a Brazilian father and a Portuguese mother, Lopes moved to Portugal at the age of four.

== Club career ==
=== Manchester City ===
Lopes played youth football for Benfica from ages 10 to 15, signing for Manchester City in 2011. He was a surprise addition to the first team's pre-season the following year, but had to wait until 7 January 2013 to make his competitive debut, when he came as an 88th-minute substitute for David Silva in a FA Cup third-round tie against Watford and scored the final goal in the 3–0 win, which made him the youngest ever scorer for the club at the age of 17 years and 9 days.

Lopes was a regular for City's Elite Development Squad in the 2012–13 season, and went on to claim the inaugural Academy Player of the Year award after winning a public vote. He was included in the team that featured in the first match of the UEFA Youth League, netting twice in a 4–1 victory at Viktoria Plzeň. He added a hat-trick in the 6–0 home rout of Bayern Munich.

On 21 January 2014, Lopes started against West Ham United in the second leg of the semi-finals of the Football League Cup. In the game, he assisted Sergio Agüero and Álvaro Negredo to a goal each, in a 3–0 away win (9–0 on aggregate).

On 7 July 2014, Lopes was loaned to Lille until the end of the campaign. His maiden appearance in Ligue 1 occurred on 9 August, in a goalless home draw against Metz. He scored his first goal on 14 September, in a 2–0 victory over Nantes also at the Stade Pierre-Mauroy.

Lopes was included in City's squad for their pre-season tour in Australia. On 5 August, he was promoted to the first team alongside Jason Denayer and Kelechi Iheanacho.

=== Monaco ===
On 28 August 2015, Lopes joined Ligue 1 side Monaco for £9 million, sharing teams with a host of compatriots including manager Leonardo Jardim. In early January 2016, he was loaned again to Lille until June.

In July 2016, still owned by Monaco, Lopes re-signed at Lille for one season. He scored a brace in the league opener, but in a 3–2 away loss against Metz.

Lopes scored his first competitive goal for the club on 16 September 2017, when he opened a 3–0 league home defeat of Strasbourg. He started for the first time in the UEFA Champions League on 1 November, and scored in the 1–1 group stage away draw with Beşiktaş.

=== Sevilla ===
On 14 August 2019, Lopes signed a five-year contract at Sevilla of the Spanish La Liga in part exchange for Wissam Ben Yedder. In his first season, he appeared in only 14 official matches.

On 29 July 2020, Lopes joined Nice on a season-long loan deal with option to buy. On 16 August 2021, in a similar move, he signed with Olympiacos. He scored his first goal for the latter club on 4 December, in a 3–1 away win against OFI Crete.

Lopes served another loan in the 2022–23 campaign, at Troyes in the French top division.

=== Braga ===
On 2 August 2023, Lopes signed for Primeira Liga club Braga on a three-year contract and a free transfer, potentially rising to €500,000 depending on clauses being met. He scored his first goal in the competition on 9 September, opening the 3–2 away victory over Moreirense.

=== Later career ===
On 16 August 2024, having cut his ties to Braga, who remained entitled to 10% of any future transfer, Lopes agreed to a two-year deal with Turkish Süper Lig's Alanyaspor. In the following transfer window, he returned to Portugal on a five-month loan at Farense.

Lopes remained in the Portuguese top tier for 2025–26, signing a three-year contract with Tondela. On 1 September 2026, however, he joined Polish club Motor Lublin on a free transfer and a two-year deal.

== International career ==
Lopes chose to represent Portugal internationally, winning caps at every youth level. He appeared with the under-20 side at the 2015 FIFA U-20 World Cup, playing all matches in New Zealand and helping his country reach the quarter-finals.

On 5 January 2014, still aged 18, Lopes made his debut with the under-21s, playing roughly 20 minutes in a 2–0 win over Macedonia for the 2015 UEFA European Championship qualifiers. He first appeared with the full side on 14 November 2017, replacing Gonçalo Guedes late in the second half of a 1–1 friendly draw against the United States.

Lopes was named in a preliminary 35-man squad for the 2018 FIFA World Cup, but did not make the final cut.

== Career statistics ==
=== Club ===
As of match played 16 May 2026

Appearances and goals by club, season and competition
Club	Season	League			National cup (Note: Includes FA Cup, Coupe de France, Copa del Rey, Greek Football Cup, Taça de Portugal, Turkish Cup)		League cup (Note: Includes Football League Cup, Coupe de la Ligue, Taça da Liga)		Europe		Other		Total	
Club	Season	Division	Apps	Goals	Apps	Goals	Apps	Goals	Apps	Goals	Apps	Goals	Apps	Goals
Manchester City	2012–13	Premier League	—		1	1	—		—		—		1	1
Manchester City	2013–14	Premier League	—		1	0	3	0	—		—		4	0
Manchester City	Total		0	0	2	1	3	0	0	0	0	0	5	1
Lille (loan)	2014–15	Ligue 1	23	3	—		1	0	3 (Note: Two appearances in UEFA Champions League, one appearance in UEFA Europa League)	0	—		27	3
Lille (loan)	2015–16	Ligue 1	12	2	1	1	3	0	—		—		16	3
Lille (loan)	2016–17	Ligue 1	25	4	2	2	0	0	2 (Note: Appearances in UEFA Europa League)	0	—		29	6
Lille (loan)	Total		60	9	3	3	4	0	5	0	0	0	72	12
Monaco	2015–16	Ligue 1	2	0	—		—		—		—		2	0
Monaco	2017–18	Ligue 1	38	15	2	1	4	0	5 (Note: Appearances in UEFA Champions League)	1	1 (Note: Appearance in Trophée des Champions)	0	50	17
Monaco	2018–19	Ligue 1	24	2	2	0	2	2	0	0	1	0	29	4
Monaco	2019–20	Ligue 1	1	0	0	0	0	0	0	0	0	0	1	0
Monaco	Total		65	17	4	1	6	2	5	1	2	0	82	21
Sevilla	2019–20	La Liga	5	0	2	0	—		7	0	—		14	0
Nice (loan)	2020–21	Ligue 1	28	3	1	2	—		4	0	—		33	5
Olympiacos	2021–22	Super League Greece	18	3	3	1	—		6	0	—		27	4
Troyes (loan)	2022–23	Ligue 1	32	7	0	0	—		—		—		32	7
Braga	2023–24	Primeira Liga	23	2	3	2	2	0	4 (Note: Three appearances in UEFA Champions League, one appearance in UEFA Europa League)	0	—		32	4
Alanyaspor	2024–25	Süper Lig	15	0	3	1	—		—		—		18	1
Farense (loan)	2024–25	Primeira Liga	14	1	0	0	—		—		—		14	1
Tondela	2025–26	Primeira Liga	16	4	1	0	1	0	—		—		18	4
Motor Lublin	2026–27	Ekstraklasa	0	0	0	0	—		—		—		0	0
Career total			276	46	22	10	16	2	31	1	2	0	347	59

=== International ===
Appearances and goals by national team and year
National team	Year	Apps	Goals
Portugal	2017	1	0
Portugal	2018	1	0
Total		2	0

== Honours ==
Manchester City

- Football League Cup: 2013–14
- FA Cup runner-up: 2012–13

Lille

- Coupe de la Ligue runner-up: 2015–16

Monaco

- Coupe de la Ligue runner-up: 2017–18
- Trophée des Champions runner-up: 2017, 2018

Sevilla

- UEFA Europa League: 2019–20

Olympiacos

- Super League Greece: 2021–22

Braga

- Taça da Liga: 2023–24

Portugal U19

- UEFA European Under-19 Championship runner-up: 2014
