= Pierre-Daniel N'Guinda =

Cameroonian footballer (born 1996)

Personal information
- Full name: Pierre-Daniel N'Guinda N'Diffon
- Date of birth: 18 June 1996 (age 30)
- Place of birth: Douala, Cameroon
- Height: 1.78 m (5 ft 10 in)
- Position: Right-back

Team information
- Current team: Swift Hesperange
- Number: 29

Youth career
- 2004–2013: Monaco

Senior career*
Years	Team	Apps	(Gls)
2014–2020	Monaco B	69	(1)
2017–2019	Monaco	0	(0)
2018	→ Quevilly-Rouen (loan)	16	(0)
2018–2019	→ Cercle Brugge (loan)	0	(0)
2021	KTP	9	(0)
2021–2022	Créteil	31	(0)
2022–2023	Le Mans	26	(0)
2023–2024	CSKA 1948	5	(0)
2023–2024	CSKA 1948 II	14	(0)
2024–	Swift Hesperange	40	(0)
- * Club domestic league appearances and goals as of 13 June 2026

Pierre-Daniel N'Guinda N'Diffon (born 18 June 1996) is a Cameroonian professional footballer who plays as a right-back for Swift Hesperange.

== Club career ==
N'Guinda made his professional debut on 2 February 2017 in the Coupe de France round of 32 against Chambly. He started the game and was replaced in the 78th minute by Irvin Cardona in a 5–4 away win.

In July 2021, N'Guinda joined Créteil in the Championnat National.

== Career statistics ==
As of match played 13 May 2022

Appearances and goals by club, season and competition
Club	Season	League			National Cup		Other		Total	
Club	Season	Division	Apps	Goals	Apps	Goals	Apps	Goals	Apps	Goals
Monaco B	2013–14	CFA	1	0	—		—		1	0
Monaco B	2015–16	CFA	27	1	—		—		27	1
Monaco B	2016–17	CFA	24	0	—		—		24	0
Monaco B	2017–18	National 2	4	0	—		—		4	0
Monaco B	2019–20	National 2	13	0	—		—		13	0
Monaco B	Total		69	1	—		—		69	1
Monaco	2016–17	Ligue 1	0	0	1	0	—		1	0
Quevilly-Rouen (loan)	2017–18	Ligue 2	16	0	—		—		16	0
Cercle Brugge (loan)	2018–19	Belgian First Division A	0	0	0	0	0	0	0	0
KTP	2021	Veikkausliiga	9	0	0	0	0	0	9	0
Creteil	2021–22	National	31	0	3	0	—		34	0
Le Mans	2022–23	National	26	0	1	0	–		27	0
CSKA 1948	2023–24	Bulgarian First League	4	0	0	0	0	0	4	0
CSKA 1948 II	2023–24	Bulgarian Second League	14	0	–		–		14	0
Career total			160	1	5	0	0	0	174	1
