= Chris Lybohy =

Nigerien footballer (born 1994)

Personal information
- Date of birth: 11 April 1994 (age 32)
- Place of birth: Beauvais, France
- Position: Midfielder

Team information
- Current team: Progrès Niederkorn
- Number: 6

Youth career
- –2012: INF Clairefontaine

Senior career*
Years	Team	Apps	(Gls)
2012–2013	Peckham United		
2014–2015	Amiens	4	(0)
2015–2016	Beauvais Oise	16	(0)
2016–2017	Paris FC B	5	(0)
2017–2018	Saint Brice		
2018–2023	Canet Roussillon	89	(2)
2023–	Progrès Niederkorn	51	(2)
- * Club domestic league appearances and goals as of 26 June 2025 ‡ National team caps and goals as of 28 November 2024

Chris Lybohy (born 11 April 1994) is a footballer who plays as a midfielder for Progrès Niederkorn. Born in France, he has been called up to represent Niger internationally.

== Early life ==
Lybohy was born on 11 April 1994 in France and is a native of Paris, France. Growing up, he supported French Ligue 1 side Olympique de Marseille and is the brother of Niger international Hervé Lybohy.

== Career ==
As a youth player, he joined INF Clairefontaine, a youth academy run by the French Football Federation. In 2012, he started his senior career with English side Peckham United FC. Two years later, he signed for French side AC Amiens before signing for French side AS Beauvais Oise. Following his stint there, he signed for French side Paris FC B, the reserve team of Paris FC, in 2016.

One year later, he signed for French side Saint Brice FC. The same year, he signed for French side Canet Roussillon FC, where he captained the club. While playing for them, he helped them reach the quarter-finals of the 2020–21 Coupe de France, knocking out French Ligue 1 side Olympique de Marseille from the competition along the way. Five years later, he signed for Luxembourgish side FC Progrès Niederkorn.
