= Antonio Barreca =

Italian footballer (born 1995)

Personal information
- Date of birth: 18 March 1995 (age 31)
- Place of birth: Turin, Italy
- Height: 1.84 m (6 ft 0 in)
- Position: Left-back

Team information
- Current team: Padova
- Number: 3

Youth career
- 2002–2014: Torino

Senior career*
Years	Team	Apps	(Gls)
2014–2018	Torino	37	(0)
2014–2015	→ Cittadella (loan)	38	(1)
2015–2016	→ Cagliari (loan)	15	(0)
2018–2022	Monaco	7	(0)
2018–2019	Monaco B	4	(0)
2019	→ Newcastle United (loan)	1	(0)
2019–2020	→ Genoa (loan)	18	(0)
2020–2021	→ Fiorentina (loan)	3	(0)
2021–2022	→ Lecce (loan)	22	(0)
2022–2023	Cagliari	22	(0)
2023–2025	Sampdoria	24	(0)
2025	Südtirol	10	(2)
2025–	Padova	23	(0)

International career
2013	Italy U18	6	(0)
2013–2014	Italy U19	4	(0)
2014	Italy U20	1	(0)
2015–2017	Italy U21	13	(0)
- * Club domestic league appearances and goals as of 2 March 2026

Antonio Barreca (born 18 March 1995) is an Italian professional footballer who plays as a left-back for Serie B club Padova.

== Club career ==
=== Early career ===
Born in Turin to Sicilian parents, he grew up in the Torino youth, where he played for each youth category up to the Primavera. In 2013–14, he led the Primavera to the finals of the Campionato Primavera, lost on penalties to Chievo. Coinciding with Torino's injury problems that season he was regularly called up to the first team by Giampiero Ventura.

==== Loans to Cittadella and Cagliari ====
In his first season as a professional, Barreca was sent on loan to Cittadella in Serie B. He made his debut in the third round of Coppa Italia, lost 4–1 to Sassuolo. Barreca scored his first goal in Serie B on 15 November 2014 in a 5–2 away loss to Carpi.

On 17 June 2015, he was loaned to Cagliari with a buyout clause and buy back clause in favour of Torino. He made his debut with the Sardi in the eighth round, away to Novara (1–0). He made 15 appearances for Cagliari, led by Massimo Rastelli, who won the championship and were promoted to Serie A. On 26 June 2016 his contract was redeemed by Torino.

=== Torino ===
He made his debut for Torino on 13 August 2016, in the third round of the Coppa Italia, won 4–1 against Pro Vercelli at the Stadio Olimpico Grande Torino. On 18 September, at age 21, he made his debut in Serie A, entering as a substitute for Christian Molinaro in the first half of the match Torino Empoli (0–0). In December 2016 he was awarded the best young player of the year by the USSI (Unione Stampa Sportiva Italiana).

=== Monaco ===
On 10 July 2018, he was sold to Ligue 1 club Monaco. On 25 August 2022, Barreca's contract with Monaco was terminated by mutual consent.

==== Loans to Newcastle United, Genoa, Fiorentina, and Lecce ====
On 31 January 2019, Barreca joined Premier League side Newcastle United on loan until the end of the 2018–19 season. He made his only appearance coming on as a substitute against Tottenham Hostspur in a 1-0 away loss. On 11 July 2019, he joined Genoa C.F.C. on loan with an option to buy. On 5 October 2020, he signed for Fiorentina on the same basis.

In 2021 he was loaned to Lecce of Serie B.

=== Return to Cagliari ===
On 25 August 2022, Barreca signed a three-year contract with Cagliari.

=== Sampdoria ===
On 18 July 2023, Barreca moved to Sampdoria on a two-year deal.

=== Südtirol ===
On 3 February 2025, Barreca joined Südtirol in Serie B until 30 June 2025.

=== Padova ===
On 31 July 2025, Barreca moved to Padova on a two-season deal.

== International career ==
He represented the Italy U-20 team on 6 January 2013 in a match valid for the Under-20 Four Nations Tournament. Gli Azzurrini lost 2–1 away to Poland.

He made his debut with the Italy U-21 squad on 12 August 2015, in a friendly match against Hungary, played in Telki.

In June 2017, he was included in the Italy under-21 squad for the 2017 UEFA European Under-21 Championship by manager Luigi Di Biagio. Italy were eliminated in the semi-finals following a 3–1 defeat to Spain on 27 June.

== Style of play ==
Barreca mainly covers the role of a left full-back or wing-back, but is often used with good results as a winger: he has notable speed, crossing ability and vision of the game.

== Career statistics ==
=== Club ===
As of 25 September 2024

Appearances and goals by club, season and competition
Club	Season	League			Cup		Europe		Other		Total	
Club	Season	Division	Apps	Goals	Apps	Goals	Apps	Goals	Apps	Goals	Apps	Goals
Torino	2013–14	Serie A	0	0	0	0	–		–		0	0
Torino	2016–17	Serie A	28	0	2	0	—		—		30	0
Torino	2017–18	Serie A	9	0	0	0	—		—		9	0
Torino	Total		37	0	2	0	—		—		39	0
Cittadella (loan)	2014–15	Serie B	38	1	1	0	–		–		39	1
Cagliari (loan)	2015–16	Serie B	15	0	2	0	–		–		17	0
Monaco	2018–19	Ligue 1	7	0	1	0	1	0	0	0	9	0
Monaco B	2018–19	Championnat National 2	4	0	—		—		—		4	0
Newcastle United (loan)	2018–19	Premier League	1	0	—		—		—		1	0
Genoa (loan)	2019–20	Serie A	18	0	1	0	—		—		19	0
Fiorentina (loan)	2020–21	Serie A	3	0	1	0	—		—		4	0
Lecce (loan)	2021–22	Serie B	22	0	2	0	—		—		24	0
Cagliari	2022–23	Serie B	22	0	1	0	—		1 (Note: Appearance in Serie B – Promotion play-offs)	0	24	0
Sampdoria	2023–24	Serie B	22	0	0	0	—		1	0	23	0
Sampdoria	2024–25	Serie B	2	0	1	0	—		—		3	0
Sampdoria	Total		24	0	1	0	—		1	0	26	0
Career total			191	1	12	0	1	0	2	0	206	1

== Honours ==
Cagliari

- Serie B: 2015–16

Monaco

- Trophée des Champions runner-up: 2018

Lecce

- Serie B: 2021–22
