= Gobé Gouano =

French footballer (born 2000)

Personal information
- Date of birth: 10 December 2000 (age 25)
- Place of birth: Ivry-sur-Seine, France
- Height: 1.85 m (6 ft 1 in)
- Position: Forward

Team information
- Current team: BFC Preussen
- Number: 9

Youth career
- 2006–2014: CF Paris
- 2014–2015: Paris FC
- 2015–2018: Monaco

Senior career*
Years	Team	Apps	(Gls)
2018–2021	Monaco B	20	(3)
2018–2021	Monaco	0	(0)
2021–2022	Aarau	2	(0)
2022–2023	Guingamp B	8	(2)
2023–2024	Orléans B	5	(3)
2024	Pirin Blagoevgrad	13	(2)
2025	Lovech	14	(2)
2025–	BFC Preussen	7	(0)

International career^{‡}
2018	France U18	2	(0)
- * Club domestic league appearances and goals as of 9 October 2025 ‡ National team caps and goals as of 29 June 2018

Gobé Gouano (born 10 December 2000) is a French professional footballer who plays as a forward for German Regionalliga Nordost club BFC Preussen.

== Club career ==
=== Monaco ===
Gouano made his professional debut on 6 November 2018 in the UEFA Champions League group stage against Club Brugge. He replaced Radamel Falcao after 61 minutes in a 4–0 home loss.

=== Aarau ===
On 2 September 2021, he signed a contract with Aarau in Switzerland until the end of 2021. The contract was not extended beyond the original expiration date.

== International career ==
Born in France, Gouano holds French and Ivorian nationalities. He is a youth international for France.

== Career statistics ==
=== Club ===
As of November 2018

Club	Season	League		Cup		League Cup		Europe		Other		Total	
Club	Season	Apps	Goals	Apps	Goals	Apps	Goals	Apps	Goals	Apps	Goals	Apps	Goals
Monaco	2018–19	0	0	0	0	0	0	1	0	0	0	1	0
Career total		0	0	0	0	0	0	1	0	0	0	1	0
