= Julien Serrano =

French footballer (born 1998)

Personal information
- Date of birth: 13 February 1998 (age 28)
- Place of birth: Aix-en-Provence, France
- Height: 1.81 m (5 ft 11 in)
- Position: Left-back

Team information
- Current team: Rousset-Ste Victoire

Youth career
- 2013: Le Pontet
- 2013–2017: Monaco

Senior career*
Years	Team	Apps	(Gls)
2017–2019	Monaco II	35	(3)
2018–2021	Monaco	7	(0)
2019–2020	→ Cercle Brugge (loan)	7	(0)
2020	→ Béziers (loan)	6	(0)
2020–2021	→ Livingston (loan)	24	(1)
2021–2022	Créteil	9	(0)
2023–	Rousset-Ste Victoire	26	(1)
- * Club domestic league appearances and goals as of 7 December 2024

Julien Serrano (born 13 February 1998) is a French professional footballer who plays as a left-back for Championnat National 3 club Rousset-Ste Victoire.

== Career ==
On 20 July 2017, Serrano signed his first professional contract with Monaco, keeping him at the club until 2020. Serrano made his professional debut for Monaco in a 3–1 Ligue 1 loss to Guingamp on 21 April 2018.

On 21 August 2020, Serrano joined Scottish Premiership side Livingston on a season-long loan deal.

On 31 August 2021, Serrano was released by Monaco. In December 2021, he signed for Créteil.
