= Jean-Eudes Aholou =

Ivorian footballer (born 1994)

Personal information
- Full name: Jean Eudes Pascal Armand Aholou
- Date of birth: 20 March 1994 (age 32)
- Place of birth: Yopougon, Ivory Coast
- Height: 1.87 m (6 ft 2 in)
- Position: Defensive midfielder

Team information
- Current team: Umm Salal
- Number: 6

Senior career*
Years	Team	Apps	(Gls)
2012–2015	Lille B	49	(4)
2015–2017	Orléans	52	(5)
2017–2018	Strasbourg	50	(5)
2018–2022	Monaco	19	(0)
2019–2020	→ Saint-Étienne (loan)	11	(1)
2020–2022	→ Strasbourg (loan)	52	(3)
2022–2024	Strasbourg	30	(3)
2024	Strasbourg B	1	(0)
2024–2025	Angers	26	(2)
2025–	Umm Salal	10	(0)

International career^{‡}
2011	Ivory Coast U17	4	(0)
2016	Ivory Coast U23	5	(0)
2018–	Ivory Coast	4	(0)
- * Club domestic league appearances and goals as of 17 January 2026 ‡ National team caps and goals as of 27 March 2018

Jean-Eudes Pascal Armand Aholou (born 20 March 1994) is an Ivorian professional footballer who plays as a defensive midfielder for Umm Salal and the Ivory Coast national team.

== Club career ==
Aholou started his career with Lille, he was with Lille between 2012 and 2015 but didn't play a match; though he was on the bench seven times in all competitions. He did, however, feature 49 times for Lille B and scored 4 goals; he played 20 times in his last season with Lille B as they were relegated to Championnat de France Amateur 2.

In 2015, Aholou joined Championnat National club Orléans. He scored twice in 32 matches in his debut season as Orléans won promotion to Ligue 2. In France's second tier, Aholou participated in 20 encounters and scored 3 goals.

On 16 January 2017, Aholou joined Ligue 2 team Strasbourg, signing a four-and-a-half-year contract.

On 25 July 2018, Aholou joined Monaco on a five-year deal. On 16 July 2021, he returned to Strasbourg on a second loan with an option to buy, after spending the 2020–21 season at Strasbourg as well.

== International career ==
Aholou has represented Ivory Coast at the U17 and U23 levels. He played in all four of Ivory Coast's matches at the 2011 FIFA U-17 World Cup in Mexico. Four years later, Aholou debuted for the U23s in the 2015 Toulon Tournament. He also played for the U23s in a 5–1 friendly loss against France U21.

Aholou is of Togolese descent through his father, but chose to represent Ivory Coast at an international level. He made his debut against Togo in a 2–2 friendly tie on 24 March 2018.

== Personal life ==
Aholou's father was a Togolese footballer who played, and then settled in the Ivory Coast. He is the brother of the Togolese international footballer Roger Aholou.

== Career statistics ==
=== Club ===
As of match played 18 August 2024

Appearances and goals by club, season and competition
Club	Season	League			National cup (Note: Includes the Coupe de France.)		League cup (Note: Includes the Coupe de la Ligue.)		Continental (Note: Includes the UEFA Europa League and CAF Champions League.)		Other (Note: Includes the Trophée des Champions.)		Total	
Club	Season	Division	Apps	Goals	Apps	Goals	Apps	Goals	Apps	Goals	Apps	Goals	Apps	Goals
Lille B	2012–13	CFA	5	0	—		—		—		—		5	0
Lille B	2013–14	CFA	24	3	—		—		—		—		24	3
Lille B	2014–15	CFA	20	1	—		—		—		—		20	1
Lille B	Total		49	4	—		—		—		—		49	4
Orléans	2015–16	National	32	2	1	0	1	0	—		—		34	2
Orléans	2016–17	Ligue 2	20	3	0	0	2	0	—		—		22	3
Orléans	Total		52	5	1	0	3	0	—		—		56	5
Strasbourg	2016–17	Ligue 2	15	0	2	0	0	0	—		0	0	17	0
Strasbourg	2017–18	Ligue 1	35	5	3	0	2	0	—		0	0	40	5
Strasbourg	Total		50	5	5	0	2	0	—		—		57	5
Monaco	2018–19	Ligue 1	17	0	0	0	0	0	3	0	1	0	21	0
Monaco	2020–21	Ligue 1	2	0	0	0	—		0	0	0	0	2	0
Monaco	Total		19	0	0	0	0	0	3	0	1	0	23	0
Saint-Étienne (loan)	2019–20	Ligue 1	11	1	2	0	0	0	4	0	0	0	17	1
Strasbourg (loan)	2020–21	Ligue 1	27	2	1	0	—		—		—		28	2
Strasbourg (loan)	2021–22	Ligue 1	25	1	1	0	—		—		—		26	1
Strasbourg	2022–23	Ligue 1	30	3	0	0	—		—		—		30	3
Strasbourg	2023–24	Ligue 1	0	0	0	0	—		—		—		0	0
Strasbourg	Total		82	6	4	0	—		—		—		86	6
Strasbourg B	2023–24	National 3	1	0	—		—		—		—		1	0
Angers	2024–25	Ligue 1	1	0	0	0	—		—		—		1	0
Career total			265	21	10	0	5	0	7	0	1	0	288	21

== Honours ==
Saint-Étienne

- Coupe de France runner-up: 2019–20
