= 2018 Coupe de la Ligue final =

French League Cup Final
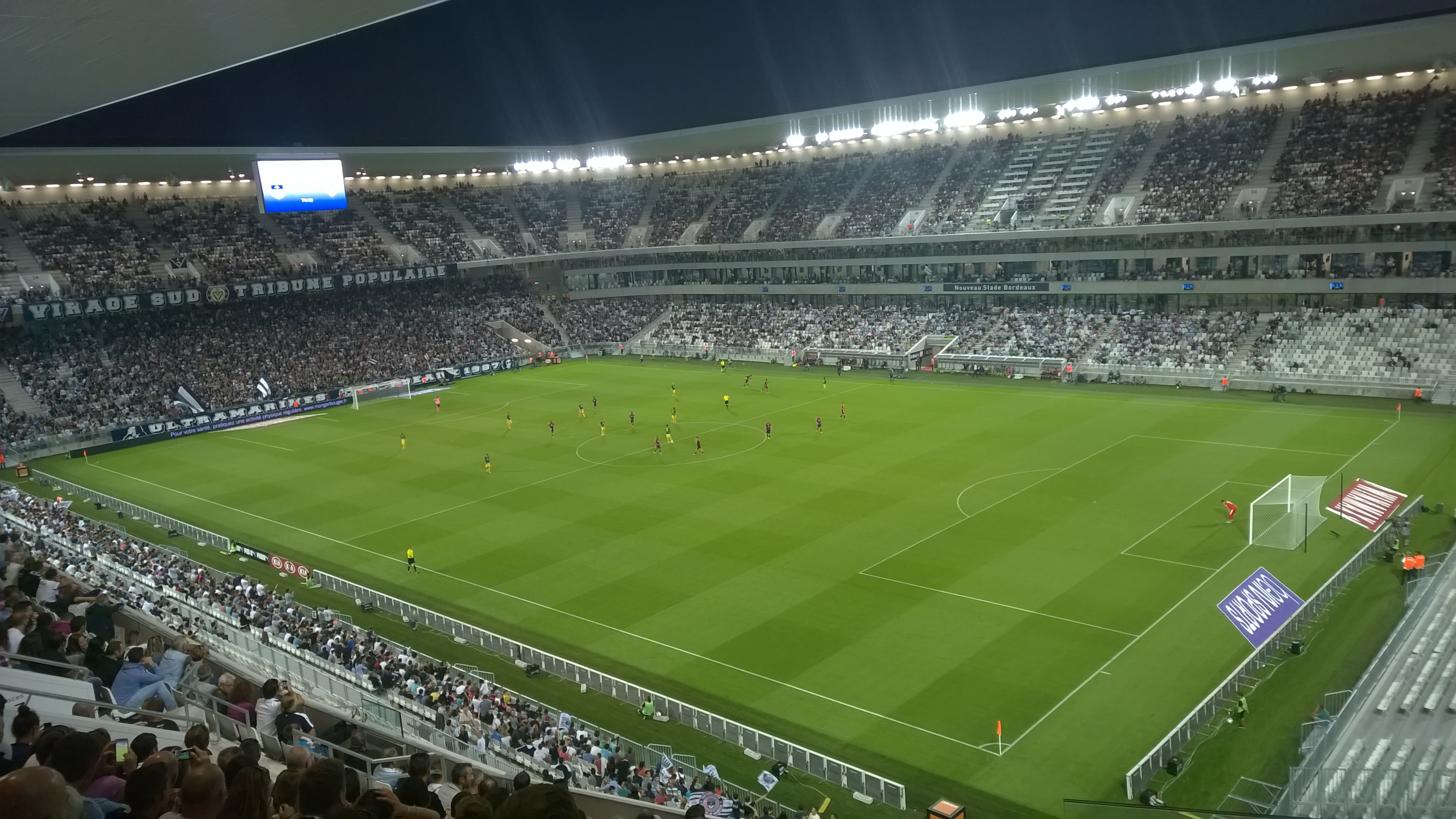
- The Nouveau Stade de Bordeaux in Bordeaux hosted the final
- Event: 2017–18 Coupe de la Ligue
Paris Saint-Germain	Monaco
3	0
- Date: 31 March 2018
- Venue: Nouveau Stade de Bordeaux, Bordeaux
- Man of the Match: Kylian Mbappé (Paris Saint-Germain)
- Referee: Clément Turpin
- Attendance: 41,248
- Weather: Clear; 5 °C (41 °F); 76% humidity

The 2018 Coupe de la Ligue final decided the winner of the 2017–18 Coupe de la Ligue, the 24th season of France's football league cup competition, the Coupe de la Ligue, a competition for the 42 teams that the Ligue de Football Professionnel (LFP) manages. The final took place on 31 March 2018 at the Nouveau Stade de Bordeaux in Bordeaux and was contested by reigning champions Paris Saint-Germain and Monaco, a rematch of the previous final.

Paris Saint-Germain won the final 3–0 for their 5th consecutive and 8th overall Coupe de la Ligue title.

== Route to the final ==
Note: In all results below, the score of the finalist is given first (H: home; A: away).

Paris Saint-Germain		Round	Monaco	
Opponent	Result	2017–18 Coupe de la Ligue	Opponent	Result
Strasbourg (A)	4–2	Round of 16	Caen (H)	2–0
Amiens (A)	2–0	Quarter-finals	Nice (A)	2–1
Rennes (A)	3–2	Semi-finals	Montpellier (H)	2–0

== Match ==
=== Details ===
31 March 2018
21:05 CEST

Paris Saint-Germain	3–0	Monaco
Cavani 8' (pen.), 85'; Di María 21'	Report

Nouveau Stade de Bordeaux, Bordeaux
Attendance: 41,248
Referee: Clément Turpin

Paris Saint-Germain	Monaco

GK	1	(Germany) Kevin Trapp
RB	32	(Brazil) Dani Alves
CB	2	(Brazil) Thiago Silva (c)
CB	3	(France) Presnel Kimpembe
LB	17	(Spain) Yuri Berchiche
CM	6	(Italy) Marco Verratti	(substituted off) 70'
CM	25	(France) Adrien Rabiot
CM	23	(Germany) Julian Draxler	(substituted off) 81'
RW	29	(France) Kylian Mbappé
CF	9	(Uruguay) Edinson Cavani
LW	11	(Argentina) Ángel Di María	(substituted off) 52'
Substitutes:
GK	16	(France) Alphonse Areola
DF	5	(Brazil) Marquinhos
DF	12	(Belgium) Thomas Meunier
DF	20	(France) Layvin Kurzawa
MF	18	(Argentina) Giovani Lo Celso	(substituted on) 70'
MF	19	(France) Lassana Diarra	(substituted on) 81'
MF	27	(Argentina) Javier Pastore	(substituted on) 52'
Manager:
(Spain) Unai Emery

GK	1	(Croatia) Danijel Subašić
RB	19	(France) Djibril Sidibé
CB	25	(Poland) Kamil Glik	(yellow card) 31'
CB	5	(Brazil) Jemerson
LB	24	(Italy) Andrea Raggi	(yellow card) 75'
CM	2	(Brazil) Fabinho
CM	17	(Belgium) Youri Tielemans		(substituted off) 46'
RW	20	(Portugal) Rony Lopes		(substituted off) 73'
AM	8	(Portugal) João Moutinho		(substituted off) 79'
LW	27	(France) Thomas Lemar
CF	9	(Colombia) Radamel Falcao (c)	(yellow card) 65'
Substitutes:
GK	30	(Senegal) Seydou Sy
DF	6	(Brazil) Jorge
DF	38	(Mali) Almamy Touré
MF	7	(Algeria) Rachid Ghezzal		(substituted on) 79'
MF	35	(France) Kévin N'Doram
FW	10	(Montenegro) Stevan Jovetić		(substituted on) 46'
FW	15	(France) Adama Diakhaby		(substituted on) 73'
Manager:
(Portugal) Leonardo Jardim

Man of the Match:
Kylian Mbappé (Paris Saint-Germain)

Assistant referees:
Nicolas Danos
Cyril Gringore
Fourth official:
Mikael Lesage
Video assistant referee:
Amaury Delerue
Assistant video assistant referee:
Nicolas Rainville

Match rules

- 90 minutes.
- 30 minutes of extra time if necessary.
- Penalty shoot-out if scores still level.
- Seven named substitutes, of which up to three may be used.

== See also ==
- 2018 Coupe de France final
- 2017–18 AS Monaco FC season
- 2017–18 Paris Saint-Germain FC season
