= 2020–21 Eintracht Frankfurt season =

Eintracht Frankfurt
2020–21 season
- President: Peter Fischer
- Chairmen: Fredi Bobič; Axel Hellmann; Oliver Frankenbach
- Head coach: Adi Hütter
- Stadium: Deutsche Bank Park
- Bundesliga: 5th
- DFB-Pokal: Second round
- Top goalscorer: League: André Silva (28); All: André Silva (29)
- Highest home attendance: 8,000
- Lowest home attendance: 6,000
- Average home league attendance: 7,000
- Biggest win: Arminia Bielefeld 1–5 Frankfurt
- Biggest defeat: Bayern Munich 5–0 Frankfurt
Home colours	Away colours	Third colours

The 2020–21 season was the 121st season in the existence of Eintracht Frankfurt and the club's ninth consecutive season in the top flight of German football. In addition to the domestic league, Eintracht Frankfurt participated in this season's edition of the DFB-Pokal. The season covered the period from 7 August 2020 to 30 June 2021.

== Players ==
=== First-team squad ===
As of 22 January 2021

Note: Flags indicate national team as defined under FIFA eligibility rules; some limited exceptions apply. Players may hold more than one non-FIFA nationality.

No.	Pos.	Nation	Player
1	GK	GER	Kevin Trapp
2	DF	FRA	Evan Ndicka
3	MF	AUT	Stefan Ilsanker
7	MF	AUS	Ajdin Hrustic
8	MF	SUI	Djibril Sow
9	FW	SRB	Luka Jović (on loan from Real Madrid)
10	MF	SRB	Filip Kostić
11	MF	SUI	Steven Zuber
13	DF	AUT	Martin Hinteregger (vice-captain)
15	MF	JPN	Daichi Kamada
17	MF	GER	Sebastian Rode
18	DF	FRA	Almamy Touré (Note: Touré was born in Bamako, Mali, but also qualified to represent France internationally and represented France at U-21 level.)
20	MF	JPN	Makoto Hasebe (captain)
21	FW	GER	Ragnar Ache

No.	Pos.	Nation	Player
22	DF	USA	Timothy Chandler (Note: Chandler was born in Frankfurt, West Germany (now Germany), but also qualified to represent the United States internationally through his father and made his international debut for the United States in March 2011.)
23	GK	GER	Markus Schubert (on loan from Schalke 04)
25	DF	GER	Erik Durm
27	MF	MAR	Aymen Barkok (Note: Barkok was born in Frankfurt, Germany, and represented Germany at U-16, U-17 and U-21 level, but also qualified to represent Morocco internationally and made his international debut for Morocco in October 2020.)
30	DF	NED	Jetro Willems
31	DF	GER	Fynn Otto
32	MF	GER	Amin Younes (on loan from Napoli)
33	FW	POR	André Silva
34	FW	ANG	Jabez Makanda
35	DF	BRA	Tuta
36	MF	AUT	Lukas Fahrnberger
38	DF	GER	Yannick Brugger
40	GK	GER	Elias Bördner

=== Players out on loan ===
Note: Flags indicate national team as defined under FIFA eligibility rules; some limited exceptions apply. Players may hold more than one non-FIFA nationality.

No.	Pos.	Nation	Player
7	FW	SRB	Dejan Joveljić (Note: Joveljić was born in Bijeljina, Bosnia and Herzegovina, but also qualified to represent Serbia internationally and represented Serbia at U-16, U-17, U-18, U-19 and U-21 level before making his international debut for Serbia in June 2021.) (at Wolfsberger AC until 30 June 2021)
24	DF	GER	Danny da Costa (at Mainz 05 until 30 June 2021)
26	MF	GER	Nils Stendera (at Lokomotive Leipzig until 30 June 2021)
28	MF	GER	Dominik Kohr (at Mainz 05 until 30 June 2021)

No.	Pos.	Nation	Player
32	GK	DEN	Frederik Rønnow (at Schalke 04 until 30 June 2021)
39	FW	POR	Gonçalo Paciência (at Schalke 04 until 30 June 2021)
—	MF	URU	Rodrigo Zalazar (Note: Zalazar was born in Albacete, Spain, but also qualified to represent Uruguay internationally through his father and represented Uruguay at U-20 level.) (at FC St. Pauli until 30 June 2021)

== Transfers ==
=== In ===
No.	Pos	Player	Transferred from	Fee	Date	Source
6	DF	(Guinea) Simon Falette	(Turkey) Fenerbahçe	Loan return	1 July 2020	
7	FW	(Serbia) Dejan Joveljić	(Belgium) Anderlecht	Loan return	1 July 2020	
21	FW	(Germany) Ragnar Ache	(Netherlands) Sparta Rotterdam	€2.0 million	1 July 2020	
27	MF	(Morocco) Aymen Barkok	(Germany) Fortuna Düsseldorf	Loan return	1 July 2020	
30	DF	(Netherlands) Jetro Willems	(England) Newcastle United	Loan return	1 July 2020	
31	DF	(Germany) Fynn Otto	Academy	Free	1 July 2020	
35	DF	(Brazil) Tuta	(Belgium) KV Kortrijk	Loan return	1 July 2020	
34	FW	(Angola) Jabez Makanda	Academy	Free	1 July 2020	
36	MF	(Austria) Lukas Fahrnberger	Academy	Free	1 July 2020	
38	DF	(Germany) Yannick Brugger	Academy	Free	1 July 2020	
	MF	(Uruguay) Rodrigo Zalazar	(Poland) Korona Kielce	Loan return	1 July 2020	
11	MF	(Switzerland) Steven Zuber	(Germany) 1899 Hoffenheim	€3.0 million	4 August 2020	
33	FW	(Portugal) André Silva	(Italy) Milan	€9.0 million	10 September 2020	
7	MF	(Australia) Ajdin Hrustic	(Netherlands) Groningen	€1.0 million	28 September 2020	
23	GK	(Germany) Markus Schubert	(Germany) Schalke 04	Loan	30 September 2020	
32	MF	(Germany) Amin Younes	(Italy) Napoli	Loan	3 October 2020	
9	FW	(Serbia) Luka Jović	(Spain) Real Madrid	Loan	14 January 2021	
40	GK	(Germany) Elias Bördner	Academy	Free	18 February 2021	

=== Out ===
No.	Pos	Player	Transferred to	Fee	Date	Source
5	MF	(Switzerland) Gelson Fernandes	Retirement	Free	1 July 2020	
6	MF	(Netherlands) Jonathan de Guzmán	(Greece) OFI	Free transfer	1 July 2020	
23	DF	(Germany) Marco Russ	Retirement	Free	1 July 2020	
11	MF	(Serbia) Mijat Gaćinović	(Germany) TSG 1899 Hoffenheim	€3.0 million	4 August 2020	
38	MF	(Germany) Patrick Finger	(Germany) Olympia Biebesheim	Free transfer	5 August 2020	
16	MF	(Spain) Lucas Torró	(Spain) CA Osasuna	€2.0 million	6 August 2020	
	MF	(Uruguay) Rodrigo Zalazar	(Germany) FC St. Pauli	Loan	6 August 2020	
7	FW	(Serbia) Dejan Joveljić	(Austria) Wolfsberger AC	Loan	26 August 2020	
26	MF	(Germany) Nils Stendera	(Germany) Lok Leipzig	Loan	10 September 2020	
30	MF	(Germany) Şahverdi Çetin	(Turkey) MKE Ankaragücü	Free transfer	10 September 2020	
4	FW	(Croatia) Ante Rebić	(Italy) Milan	€5.0 million	12 September 2020	
39	FW	(Portugal) Gonçalo Paciência	(Germany) FC Schalke 04	Loan €2.0 million	15 September 2020	
32	FW	(Denmark) Frederik Rønnow	(Germany) FC Schalke 04	Loan	30 September 2020	
29	GK	(Germany) Felix Wiedwald	(Netherlands) FC Emmen	Free transfer	5 October 2020	
6	DF	(Guinea) Simon Falette	(Germany) Hannover 96	Free transfer	5 October 2020	
9	FW	(Netherlands) Bas Dost	(Belgium) Club Brugge	€4.0 million	24 December 2020	
42	MF	(Bosnia and Herzegovina) Marijan Ćavar	(Germany) SpVgg Greuther Fürth	Free transfer	14 January 2021	
19	DF	(Argentina) David Abraham	(Argentina) Hurácan de Chabás	Free transfer	18 January 2021	
28	MF	(Germany) Dominik Kohr	(Germany) Mainz 05	Loan	18 January 2021	
24	DF	(Germany) Danny da Costa	(Germany) Mainz 05	Loan	22 January 2021	

== Pre-season and friendlies ==
Win Draw Loss

22 August 2020	PSV Eindhoven (Netherlands)	1–2	(Germany) Eintracht Frankfurt	Eindhoven, Netherlands
18:00 CEST (UTC+2)	Gakpo 63'	Report	Kamada 55'; Hinteregger 68'	Stadium: Philips Stadion; Referee: Allard Lindhout

29 August 2020	Ajax (Netherlands)	2–1	(Germany) Eintracht Frankfurt	Amsterdam, Netherlands
19:00 CEST (UTC+2)	Promes 4'; Kudus 47'	Report	Silva 51'	Stadium: Johan Cruyff Arena; Attendance: 6,000; Referee: Danny Makkelie

5 September 2020	Eintracht Frankfurt (Germany)	Cancelled	(Germany) Mainz 05	Frankfurt, Germany
15:30 CEST (UTC+2)		Report		Stadium: Deutsche Bank Park
Note: Called off due to two positive COVID-19 cases in the Mainz 05 squad.

9 October 2020	Eintracht Frankfurt (Germany)	0–3	(Germany) Würzburger Kickers	Frankfurt, Germany
14:00 CEST (UTC+2)		Report	Tuta 15' (o.g.); Sontheimer 60', 71'	Stadium: Deutsche Bank Park; Referee: Schlager

12 November 2020	Eintracht Frankfurt (Germany)	0–2	(Germany) 1. FC Nürnberg	Frankfurt, Germany
14:00 CET (UTC+1)		Report	Geis 47'; Lohkemper 86'	Stadium: Deutsche Bank Park; Attendance: 0

25 March 2021	Eintracht Frankfurt (Germany)	Cancelled	(Germany) SV Wehen Wiesbaden	Frankfurt, Germany
15:00 CET (UTC+1)				Stadium: Deutsche Bank Park; Attendance: 0

== Competitions ==
=== Overview ===
Competition	First match	Last match	Starting round	Final position	Record							
Competition	First match	Last match	Starting round	Final position	Pld	W	D	L	GF	GA	GD	Win %
Bundesliga	19 September 2020	22 May 2021	Matchday 1	5th	34	16	12	6	69	53	+16	47.06
DFB-Pokal	12 September 2020	12 January 2021	First round	Second round	2	1	0	1	3	5	−2	50.00
Total					36	17	12	7	72	58	+14	47.22

Last updated: 22 May 2021
Source: Soccerway

=== Bundesliga ===
==== League table ====
Pos	Team	Pld	W	D	L	GF	GA	GD	Pts	Qualification or relegation
3	Borussia Dortmund	34	20	4	10	75	46	+29	64	Qualification for the Champions League group stage
4	VfL Wolfsburg	34	17	10	7	61	37	+24	61	Qualification for the Champions League group stage
5	Eintracht Frankfurt	34	16	12	6	69	53	+16	60	Qualification for the Europa League group stage (Note: Since the winners of the 2020–21 DFB-Pokal, Borussia Dortmund, qualified for the Champions League based on league position, the Europa League group stage spot was passed to the sixth-placed team, and the Europa Conference League play-off round spot was passed to the seventh-placed team.)
6	Bayer Leverkusen	34	14	10	10	53	39	+14	52	Qualification for the Europa League group stage
7	Union Berlin	34	12	14	8	50	43	+7	50	Qualification for the Europa Conference League play-off round

Source: DFB
Rules for classification: 1) Points; 2) Goal difference; 3) Goals scored; 4) Head-to-head results; 5) Head-to-head away goals scored; 6) Away goals scored; 7) Play-off.

==== Results summary ====
Overall								Home						Away					
Pld	W	D	L	GF	GA	GD	Pts	W	D	L	GF	GA	GD	W	D	L	GF	GA	GD
34	16	12	6	69	53	+16	60	10	7	0	37	20	+17	6	5	6	32	33	−1

Last updated: 22 May 2021.
Source: DFB

==== Results by round ====
Round	1	2	3	4	5	6	7	8	9	10	11	12	13	14	15	16	17	18	19	20	21	22	23	24	25	26	27	28	29	30	31	32	33	34
Ground	H	A	H	A	A	H	A	H	A	H	A	H	A	H	A	H	A	A	H	A	H	H	A	H	A	H	A	H	A	H	A	H	A	H
Result	D	W	W	D	L	D	D	D	D	D	L	D	W	W	W	W	D	W	W	W	W	W	L	D	D	W	W	W	L	W	L	D	L	W
Position	8	3	3	4	8	10	11	11	9	9	9	10	9	8	9	7	8	6	4	4	3	4	4	4	4	4	4	4	4	4	4	5	5	5

Updated to match(es) played on 22 May 2021. Source: DFB
A = Away; H = Home; W = Win; D = Draw; L = Loss

==== Matches ====
The league fixtures were announced on 7 August 2020.

19 September 2020 1	Eintracht Frankfurt	1–1	Arminia Bielefeld	Frankfurt
15:30 CEST (UTC+2)	Dost (yellow card) 33'; Barkok (yellow card) 55'; Silva 62'	Report	De Medina (yellow card) 7'; Soukou 51'; Brunner (yellow card) 70'	Stadium: Deutsche Bank Park; Attendance: 6,500; Referee: Benjamin Brand

25 September 2020 2	Hertha BSC	1–3	Eintracht Frankfurt	Berlin
20:30 CEST (UTC+2)	Tousart (yellow card) 35'; Cunha (yellow card) 72'; Hinteregger 77' (o.g.); Boyata (yellow card) 78'	Report	Silva 30' (pen.); Dost 37'; Rode (yellow card) 47', (goal) 71'; Touré (yellow card) 56'; Kamada (yellow card) 84'; Ilsanker (yellow card) 90'	Stadium: Olympiastadion; Attendance: 4,000; Referee: Bastian Dankert

3 October 2020 3	Eintracht Frankfurt	2–1	1899 Hoffenheim	Frankfurt
15:30 CEST (UTC+2)	Rode (yellow card) 35'; Zuber (yellow card) 52'; Kamada 55'; Dost 71'	Report	Kramarić 18'; Geiger (yellow card) 41'; Grillitsch (yellow card) 56'; Posch (yellow card) 83'	Stadium: Deutsche Bank Park; Attendance: 8,000; Referee: Manuel Gräfe

18 October 2020 4	1. FC Köln	1–1	Eintracht Frankfurt	Cologne
15:30 CEST (UTC+2)	Ehizibue (yellow card) 15'; Duda 52'; Rexhbeçaj (yellow card) 54'; Horn (yellow card) 64'	Report	Hasebe (yellow card) 19'; Silva 45+2' (pen.); Younes (yellow card) 88'	Stadium: RheinEnergieStadion; Attendance: 300; Referee: Sven Jablonski

24 October 2020 5	Bayern Munich	5–0	Eintracht Frankfurt	Munich
15:30 CEST (UTC+2)	Lewandowski 10', 26', 60'; Goretzka (yellow card) 17'; Boateng (yellow card) 45+2'; Kimmich (yellow card) 46'; Sané 72'; Musiala 90'	Report		Stadium: Allianz Arena; Attendance: 0 Referee: Markus Schmidt

31 October 2020 6	Eintracht Frankfurt	1–1	Werder Bremen	Frankfurt
15:30 CET (UTC+1)	Ilsanker (yellow card) 4'; Silva 65'	Report	Mbom (yellow card) 45+2'; Sargent 51', (yellow card) 55'; Osako (yellow card) 90+3'	Stadium: Deutsche Bank Park; Attendance: 0 Referee: Felix Brych

7 November 2020 7	VfB Stuttgart	2–2	Eintracht Frankfurt	Stuttgart
15:30 CET (UTC+1)	González 17' (pen.), (yellow card) 77'; Castro 37', (yellow card) 88'	Report	Abraham (yellow card) 29', (goal) 75'; Barkok (yellow card) 50'; Hasebe (yellow card) 54'; Dost (yellow card) 54'; Silva 61'	Stadium: Mercedes-Benz Arena; Attendance: 0 Referee: Sascha Stegemann

21 November 2020 8	Eintracht Frankfurt	1–1	RB Leipzig	Frankfurt
18:30 CET (UTC+1)	Barkok 43'; Durm (yellow card) 49'; Sow (yellow card) 60'; Abraham (yellow card) 83'	Report	Nkunku (yellow card) 9'; Olmo (yellow card) 45'; Poulsen 57'	Stadium: Deutsche Bank Park; Attendance: 0 Referee: Sören Storks

28 November 2020 9	Union Berlin	3–3	Eintracht Frankfurt	Berlin
15:30 CET (UTC+1)	Andrich 2'; Kruse 6' (pen.), 82'; Prömel (yellow card) 57'; Lenz (yellow card) 61'	Report	Silva 27', 37'; Sow (yellow card) 59'; Ndicka (yellow card) 62'; Dost 79'; Ilsanker (yellow card) 81'	Stadium: Stadion An der Alten Försterei; Attendance: 0 Referee: Tobias Reichel

5 December 2020 10	Eintracht Frankfurt	1–1	Borussia Dortmund	Frankfurt
15:30 CET (UTC+1)	Kamada 9', (yellow card) 47'; Ndicka (yellow card) 41'; Rode (yellow card) 60'; Sow (yellow card) 64'; Kostić (yellow card) 82'; Abraham (yellow card) 85'	Report	Reyna 56'; Can (yellow card) 88'	Stadium: Deutsche Bank Park; Attendance: 0 Referee: Guido Winkmann

11 December 2020 11	VfL Wolfsburg	2–1	Eintracht Frankfurt	Wolfsburg
20:30 CET (UTC+1)	Lacroix (yellow card) 42'; Brekalo (yellow card) 59'; Brooks (yellow card) 62'; Weghorst 76' (pen.), 88', (yellow card) 87'; Schlager (yellow card) 82'	Report	Ndicka (yellow card) 15'; Dost 63' (pen.), (yellow card) 90+3'	Stadium: Volkswagen Arena; Attendance: 0 Referee: Markus Schmidt

15 December 2020 12	Eintracht Frankfurt	3–3	Borussia Mönchengladbach	Frankfurt
18:30 CET (UTC+1)	Hasebe (yellow card) 13'; Silva 22' (pen.), 24'; Abraham (yellow card) 30' (yellow-red card) 81'; Barkok 32', (yellow card) 89'; Kohr (yellow card) 75'; Rode (yellow card) 81'	Report	Stindl 14', 90' (pen.), 90+5', (yellow card) 90+6'; Lainer (yellow card) 21'; Zakaria (yellow card) 78'; Embolo (yellow card) 81'	Stadium: Deutsche Bank Park; Attendance: 0 Referee: Benjamin Cortus

19 December 2020 13	FC Augsburg	0–2	Eintracht Frankfurt	Augsburg
15:30 CET (UTC+1)	Caligiuri (yellow card) 89'	Report	Sow (yellow card) 30'; Framberger 53' (o.g.); Barkok (yellow card) 56'; Rode (yellow card) 67'; Hinteregger (yellow card) 72'; Ilsanker 87'	Stadium: WWK Arena; Attendance: 0 Referee: Daniel Siebert

2 January 2021 14	Eintracht Frankfurt	2–1	Bayer Leverkusen	Frankfurt
15:30 CET (UTC+1)	Younes 22'; Tapsoba 54' (o.g.)	Report	Amiri 10'	Stadium: Deutsche Bank Park; Attendance: 0 Referee: Felix Brych

9 January 2021 15	Mainz 05	0–2	Eintracht Frankfurt	Mainz
15:30 CET (UTC+1)	Niakhaté (yellow card) 22'; Quaison (yellow card) 43'	Report	Silva 24' (pen.), 72' (pen.); Hasebe (yellow card) 59'	Stadium: Opel Arena; Attendance: 0 Referee: Bastian Dankert

17 January 2021 16	Eintracht Frankfurt	3–1	Schalke 04	Frankfurt
18:00 CET (UTC+1)	Silva 28'; Jović 72', 90+1'	Report	Hoppe 29'; Kutucu (yellow card) 87'	Stadium: Deutsche Bank Park; Attendance: 0 Referee: Manuel Gräfe

20 January 2021 17	SC Freiburg	2–2	Eintracht Frankfurt	Freiburg im Breisgau
20:30 CET (UTC+1)	Sallai 32'; Höler (yellow card) 53'; Petersen 63'; Demirović (yellow card) 65'; Gulde (yellow card) 90+1'	Report	Younes 6'; Barkok (yellow card) 40'; Tuta (yellow card) 65'; Schlotterbeck 75' (o.g.); Jović (yellow card) 90+1'	Stadium: Schwarzwald-Stadion; Attendance: 0 Referee: Guido Winkmann

23 January 2021 18	Arminia Bielefeld	1–5	Eintracht Frankfurt	Bielefeld
15:30 CET (UTC+1)	Kunze (yellow card) 30'; Córdova 36'; Seufert (yellow card) 66'	Report	Silva 25', 33'; Kostić 27'; Ndicka (yellow card) 39'; Younes (yellow card) 45+2'; Nilsson 51' (o.g.); Jović 75'	Stadium: Bielefelder Alm; Attendance: 0 Referee: Robert Schröder

30 January 2021 19	Eintracht Frankfurt	3–1	Hertha BSC	Frankfurt
15:30 CET (UTC+1)	Tuta (yellow card) 35'; Silva 67', 90+5' (pen.); Hinteregger 85'	Report	Tousart (yellow card) 37'; Torunarigha (yellow card) 59'; Piątek 66', (yellow card) 88'; Cunha (yellow card) 90+4'	Stadium: Deutsche Bank Park; Attendance: 0 Referee: Florian Badstübner

7 February 2021 20	1899 Hoffenheim	1–3	Eintracht Frankfurt	Sinsheim
15:30 CET (UTC+1)	Bebou 47'	Report	Kostić 15'; Hinteregger (yellow card) 43'; Younes (yellow card) 56'; Ndicka 62'; Silva 64'; Tuta (yellow card) 88'	Stadium: Rhein-Neckar-Arena; Attendance: 0 Referee: Daniel Siebert

14 February 2021 21	Eintracht Frankfurt	2–0	1. FC Köln	Frankfurt
15:30 CET (UTC+1)	Sow (yellow card) 32'; Silva 57'; Touré (yellow card) 75'; Ndicka 79'; Kostić (yellow card) 86'	Report	Meré (yellow card) 90+1'	Stadium: Deutsche Bank Park; Attendance: 0 Referee: Frank Willenborg

20 February 2021 22	Eintracht Frankfurt	2–1	Bayern Munich	Frankfurt
15:30 CET (UTC+1)	Kamada 12'; Younes 31'; Rode (yellow card) 56'; Ndicka (yellow card) 90+2'	Report	Lewandowski 53'	Stadium: Deutsche Bank Park; Attendance: 0 Referee: Sascha Stegemann

26 February 2021 23	Werder Bremen	2–1	Eintracht Frankfurt	Bremen
20:30 CET (UTC+1)	Gebre Selassie (yellow card) 35', (goal) 47'; Sargent 62'; Schmid (yellow card) 78'; Friedl (yellow card) 81'; Möhwald (yellow card) 81'	Report	Silva 9'; Rode (yellow card) 40'; Younes (yellow card) 81'; Tuta (yellow card) 90+2'	Stadium: Weser-Stadion; Attendance: 0 Referee: Robert Hartmann

6 March 2021 24	Eintracht Frankfurt	1–1	VfB Stuttgart	Frankfurt
15:30 CET (UTC+1)	Ndicka (yellow card) 27'; Hinteregger (yellow card) 31'; Kostić 69'	Report	Silas (yellow card) 54'; Coulibaly (yellow card) 59'; Kalajdžić 68'; Mangala (yellow card) 77'	Stadium: Deutsche Bank Park; Attendance: 0 Referee: Robert Schröder

14 March 2021 25	RB Leipzig	1–1	Eintracht Frankfurt	Leipzig
15:30 CET (UTC+1)	Kluivert (yellow card) 44'; Forsberg 47'; Mukiele (yellow card) 90+3'	Report	Younes (yellow card) 15'; Ndicka (yellow card) 49'; Kamada 61'; Tuta (yellow card) 69'	Stadium: Red Bull Arena; Attendance: 0 Referee: Felix Zwayer

20 March 2021 26	Eintracht Frankfurt	5–2	Union Berlin	Frankfurt
15:30 CET (UTC+1)	Silva 2', 41'; Andrich 35' (o.g.); Kostić 39'; Hasebe (yellow card) 72'; Chandler 90+2'	Report	Kruse 7', 45+3'; Teuchert (yellow card) 86'; Andrich (yellow card) 89'	Stadium: Deutsche Bank Park; Attendance: 0 Referee: Markus Schmidt

3 April 2021 27	Borussia Dortmund	1–2	Eintracht Frankfurt	Dortmund
15:30 CEST (UTC+2)	Hummels 45'	Report	Schulz 11' (o.g.); Kostić (yellow card) 25'; Sow (yellow card) 33'; Rode (yellow card) 76'; Silva 87'	Stadium: Westfalenstadion; Attendance: 0 Referee: Manuel Gräfe

10 April 2021 28	Eintracht Frankfurt	4–3	VfL Wolfsburg	Frankfurt
15:30 CEST (UTC+2)	Kamada 8', (yellow card) 45+1'; Jović 27'; Ndicka (yellow card) 35'; Silva 54'; Durm 61'; Rode (yellow card) 83'	Report	Baku 6'; Weghorst 46'; Mbabu (yellow card) 74'; Tuta 85' (o.g.); Arnold (yellow card) 90+4'	Stadium: Deutsche Bank Park; Attendance: 0 Referee: Marco Fritz

17 April 2021 29	Borussia Mönchengladbach	4–0	Eintracht Frankfurt	Mönchengladbach
15:30 CEST (UTC+2)	Ginter 10'; Bensebaini (yellow card) 46', (goal) 67'; Hofmann 60'; Wolf 90+5'	Report	Ndicka (yellow card) 43'; Ilsanker (yellow card) 54'; Silva (yellow card) 75'; Chandler (yellow card) 78'	Stadium: Borussia-Park; Attendance: 0 Referee: Deniz Aytekin

20 April 2021 30	Eintracht Frankfurt	2–0	FC Augsburg	Frankfurt
20:30 CEST (UTC+2)	Hinteregger (yellow card) 31', (goal) 37'; Jović (yellow card) 51'; Silva 58'; Rode (yellow card) 84'	Report	Uduokhai (yellow card) 46'; Finnbogason (penalty missed) 73'	Stadium: Deutsche Bank Park; Attendance: 0 Referee: Robert Schröder

24 April 2021 31	Bayer Leverkusen	3–1	Eintracht Frankfurt	Leverkusen
18:30 CEST (UTC+2)	Bailey 70'; Palacios (yellow card) 76'; Alario 80'; Demirbay 90+1'	Report	Ndicka (yellow card) 87'; Silva 90+1'	Stadium: BayArena; Attendance: 0 Referee: Felix Zwayer

9 May 2021 32	Eintracht Frankfurt	1–1	Mainz 05	Frankfurt
15:30 CEST (UTC+2)	Kostić (yellow card) 30'; Hrustic (yellow card) 50', (goal) 86'	Report	Onisiwo 11'	Stadium: Deutsche Bank Park; Attendance: 0 Referee: Felix Brych

15 May 2021 33	Schalke 04	4–3	Eintracht Frankfurt	Gelsenkirchen
15:30 CEST (UTC+2)	Huntelaar (penalty missed) 15', 15'; Idrizi 52'; Flick 60'; Hoppe 64'	Report	Silva 29', 72'; Ndicka 51'; Chandler (yellow card) 90'; Ache (yellow card) 90+1'	Stadium: Arena AufSchalke; Attendance: 0 Referee: Sven Jablonski

22 May 2021 34	Eintracht Frankfurt	3–1	SC Freiburg	Frankfurt
15:30 CEST (UTC+2)	Hrustic (yellow card) 36'; Silva 62' (pen.); Touré 87'; Ache 90+2'	Report	Jeong 77'	Stadium: Deutsche Bank Park; Attendance: 0 Referee: Christian Dingert

=== DFB-Pokal ===
12 September 2020 First round	1860 Munich	1–2	Eintracht Frankfurt	Munich
15:30 CEST (UTC+2)	Moll (yellow card) 19'; Wein (yellow card) 73'; Steinhart 78' (pen.)	Report	Silva 51'; Dost 56'; Abraham (yellow card) 70'	Stadium: Grünwalder Stadion; Attendance: 0 Referee: Martin Petersen

12 January 2021 (Note: The Bayer Leverkusen v Eintracht Frankfurt match was rescheduled to 12 January 2021 following a request by Bayer Leverkusen, as they had a heavy schedule in December.) Second round	Bayer Leverkusen	4–1	Eintracht Frankfurt	Leverkusen
20:45 CET (UTC+1)	Alario 27' (pen.); Tapsoba 49', (yellow card) 61'; Diaby 67', 87'; Tah (red card) 73'; L. Bender (yellow card) 83'	Report	Younes 6'; Hinteregger (yellow card) 42'	Stadium: BayArena; Attendance: 0 Referee: Christian Dingert

== Statistics ==
=== Appearances and goals ===
No.	Pos	Nat	Player	Total		Bundesliga		DFB-Pokal	
No.	Pos	Nat	Player	Apps	Goals	Apps	Goals	Apps	Goals
Goalkeepers
1	GK	(Germany) GER	Kevin Trapp	35	0	33	0	2	0
23	GK	(Germany) GER	Markus Schubert	0	0	0	0	0	0
40	GK	(Germany) GER	Elias Bördner	1	0	1	0	0	0
Defenders
2	DF	(France) FRA	Evan Ndicka	25	3	23	3	2	0
13	DF	(Austria) AUT	Martin Hinteregger	31	2	29	2	2	0
18	DF	(France) FRA	Almamy Touré	18	1	8+9	1	0+1	0
22	DF	(United States) USA	Timothy Chandler	15	1	3+10	1	0+2	0
25	DF	(Germany) GER	Erik Durm	21	1	18+2	1	1	0
30	DF	(Netherlands) NED	Jetro Willems	0	0	0	0	0	0
31	DF	(Germany) GER	Fynn Otto	0	0	0	0	0	0
35	DF	(Brazil) BRA	Tuta	19	0	16+2	0	1	0
38	DF	(Germany) GER	Yannick Brugger	0	0	0	0	0	0
Midfielders
3	MF	(Austria) AUT	Stefan Ilsanker	29	1	17+10	1	1+1	0
7	MF	(Australia) AUS	Ajdin Hrustic	12	1	1+10	1	0+1	0
8	MF	(Switzerland) SUI	Djibril Sow	29	0	25+3	0	0+1	0
10	MF	(Serbia) SRB	Filip Kostić	30	4	29+1	4	0	0
11	MF	(Switzerland) SUI	Steven Zuber	22	0	6+14	0	1+1	0
15	MF	(Japan) JPN	Daichi Kamada	34	5	28+4	5	2	0
17	MF	(Germany) GER	Sebastian Rode	29	1	19+8	1	2	0
20	MF	(Japan) JPN	Makoto Hasebe	29	0	26+3	0	0	0
27	MF	(Morocco) MAR	Aymen Barkok	27	2	9+16	2	1+1	0
32	MF	(Germany) GER	Amin Younes	27	4	16+10	3	1	1
36	MF	(Austria) AUT	Lukas Fahrnberger	0	0	0	0	0	0
Forwards
9	FW	(Serbia) SRB	Luka Jović	18	4	8+10	4	0	0
21	FW	(Germany) GER	Ragnar Ache	7	1	0+7	1	0	0
33	FW	(Portugal) POR	André Silva	34	29	32	28	2	1
34	FW	(Angola) ANG	Jabez Makanda	0	0	0	0	0	0
Players transferred out during the season
4	FW	(Croatia) CRO	Ante Rebić	0	0	0	0	0	0
6	DF	(Guinea) GUI	Simon Falette	0	0	0	0	0	0
7	FW	(Serbia) SRB	Dejan Joveljić	0	0	0	0	0	0
9	FW	(Netherlands) NED	Bas Dost	12	5	9+2	4	1	1
19	DF	(Argentina) ARG	David Abraham	15	1	14	1	1	0
24	DF	(Germany) GER	Danny da Costa	7	0	1+5	0	1	0
26	MF	(Germany) GER	Nils Stendera	0	0	0	0	0	0
28	MF	(Germany) GER	Dominik Kohr	9	0	2+5	0	1+1	0
29	GK	(Germany) GER	Felix Wiedwald	0	0	0	0	0	0
32	GK	(Denmark) DEN	Frederik Rønnow	0	0	0	0	0	0
39	FW	(Portugal) POR	Gonçalo Paciência	0	0	0	0	0	0
42	MF	(Bosnia and Herzegovina) BIH	Marijan Ćavar	0	0	0	0	0	0

Last updated: 22 May 2021
Source: Competitions

=== Goalscorers ===
Rank	No.	Pos.	Nat.	Player	Bundesliga	DFB-Pokal	Total
1	33	FW	(Portugal)	André Silva	28	1	29
2	9	FW	(Netherlands)	Bas Dost	4	1	5
2	15	MF	(Japan)	Daichi Kamada	5	0	5
4	9	FW	(Serbia)	Luka Jović	4	0	4
4	10	MF	(Serbia)	Filip Kostić	4	0	4
4	32	MF	(Germany)	Amin Younes	3	1	4
7	2	DF	(France)	Evan Ndicka	3	0	3
8	13	DF	(Austria)	Martin Hinteregger	2	0	2
8	27	MF	(Morocco)	Aymen Barkok	2	0	2
10	3	MF	(Austria)	Stefan Ilsanker	1	0	1
10	7	MF	(Australia)	Ajdin Hrustic	1	0	1
10	17	MF	(Germany)	Sebastian Rode	1	0	1
10	18	DF	(France)	Almamy Touré	1	0	1
10	19	DF	(Argentina)	David Abraham	1	0	1
10	21	FW	(Germany)	Ragnar Ache	1	0	1
10	22	DF	(United States)	Timothy Chandler	1	0	1
10	25	DF	(Germany)	Erik Durm	1	0	1
Own goals					6	0	6
Totals					69	3	72

=== Clean sheets ===
Rank	No.	Pos.	Nat.	Player	Bundesliga	DFB-Pokal	Total
1	1	GK	(Germany)	Kevin Trapp	4	0	4
Totals					4	0	4

=== Disciplinary record ===
No.	Pos.	Nat.	Player	Bundesliga			DFB-Pokal			Total		
No.	Pos.	Nat.	Player	Yellow card	(yellow card) (yellow-red card)	Red card	Yellow card	(yellow card) (yellow-red card)	Red card	Yellow card	(yellow card) (yellow-red card)	Red card
Totals
1	GK	(Germany)	Kevin Trapp	0	0	0	0	0	0	0	0	0
2	DF	(France)	Evan Ndicka	10	0	0	0	0	0	10	0	0
3	MF	(Austria)	Stefan Ilsanker	4	0	0	0	0	0	4	0	0
6	DF	(Guinea)	Simon Falette	0	0	0	0	0	0	0	0	0
7	FW	(Serbia)	Dejan Joveljić	0	0	0	0	0	0	0	0	0
7	MF	(Australia)	Ajdin Hrustic	2	0	0	0	0	0	2	0	0
8	MF	(Switzerland)	Djibril Sow	6	0	0	0	0	0	6	0	0
9	FW	(Netherlands)	Bas Dost	3	0	0	0	0	0	3	0	0
9	FW	(Serbia)	Luka Jović	2	0	0	0	0	0	2	0	0
10	MF	(Serbia)	Filip Kostić	4	0	0	0	0	0	4	0	0
11	MF	(Switzerland)	Steven Zuber	1	0	0	0	0	0	1	0	0
13	DF	(Austria)	Martin Hinteregger	4	0	0	1	0	0	5	0	0
15	MF	(Japan)	Daichi Kamada	3	0	0	0	0	0	3	0	0
17	MF	(Germany)	Sebastian Rode	10	0	0	0	0	0	10	0	0
18	DF	(France)	Almamy Touré	2	0	0	0	0	0	2	0	0
19	DF	(Argentina)	David Abraham	3	1	0	1	0	0	4	1	0
20	MF	(Japan)	Makoto Hasebe	5	0	0	0	0	0	5	0	0
21	FW	(Germany)	Ragnar Ache	1	0	0	0	0	0	1	0	0
22	DF	(United States)	Timothy Chandler	1	0	0	0	0	0	1	0	0
23	GK	(Germany)	Markus Schubert	0	0	0	0	0	0	0	0	0
24	DF	(Germany)	Danny da Costa	0	0	0	0	0	0	0	0	0
25	DF	(Germany)	Erik Durm	1	0	0	0	0	0	1	0	0
26	MF	(Germany)	Nils Stendera	0	0	0	0	0	0	0	0	0
27	MF	(Morocco)	Aymen Barkok	5	0	0	0	0	0	5	0	0
28	MF	(Germany)	Dominik Kohr	1	0	0	0	0	0	1	0	0
29	GK	(Germany)	Felix Wiedwald	0	0	0	0	0	0	0	0	0
30	DF	(Netherlands)	Jetro Willems	0	0	0	0	0	0	0	0	0
31	DF	(Germany)	Fynn Otto	0	0	0	0	0	0	0	0	0
32	GK	(Denmark)	Frederik Rønnow	0	0	0	0	0	0	0	0	0
32	MF	(Germany)	Amin Younes	5	0	0	0	0	0	5	0	0
33	FW	(Portugal)	André Silva	1	0	0	0	0	0	1	0	0
35	DF	(Brazil)	Tuta	5	0	0	0	0	0	5	0	0
39	FW	(Portugal)	Gonçalo Paciência	0	0	0	0	0	0	0	0	0
40	GK	(Germany)	Elias Bördner	0	0	0	0	0	0	0	0	0
42	MF	(Bosnia and Herzegovina)	Marijan Ćavar	0	0	0	0	0	0	0	0	0
Totals				77	1	0	2	0	0	79	1	0
