= Badiashile =

Badiashile is a surname. Notable people with the surname include:

- Benoît Badiashile, (born 2001), French footballer
- Loïc Badiashile (born 1998), French footballer
