= 2017–18 AS Monaco FC season =

Monaco
2017–18 season
- President: Dmitry Rybolovlev
- Head coach: Leonardo Jardim
- Stadium: Stade Louis II
- Ligue 1: 2nd
- Coupe de France: Round of 32
- Coupe de la Ligue: Runners-up
- Trophée des Champions: Runners-up
- UEFA Champions League: Group stage
- Top goalscorer: League: Radamel Falcao (18); All: Radamel Falcao (24)
- Highest home attendance: 16,588 vs Paris Saint-Germain (26 November 2017)
- Lowest home attendance: 4,834 vs Caen (12 December 2017)
- Average home league attendance: 9,243
Home colours	Away colours	Third colours

The 2017–18 season was AS Monaco FC's fifth consecutive season in Ligue 1 since promotion from Ligue 2 in 2013. They were the defending Ligue 1 champions and also took part in the Coupe de France, the Coupe de la Ligue, the Trophée des Champions and the UEFA Champions League.

== Players ==
=== First-team squad ===
As of 31 January 2018

Note: Flags indicate national team as defined under FIFA eligibility rules; some limited exceptions apply. Players may hold more than one non-FIFA nationality.

No.	Pos.	Nation	Player
1	GK	CRO	Danijel Subašić
2	MF	BRA	Fabinho
5	DF	BRA	Jemerson
6	DF	BRA	Jorge
7	MF	ALG	Rachid Ghezzal
8	MF	POR	João Moutinho
9	FW	COL	Radamel Falcao (captain)
10	FW	MNE	Stevan Jovetić
14	FW	SEN	Keita Baldé
15	FW	FRA	Adama Diakhaby
16	GK	SUI	Diego Benaglio
17	MF	BEL	Youri Tielemans
19	DF	FRA	Djibril Sidibé

No.	Pos.	Nation	Player
20	MF	POR	Rony Lopes
21	DF	FRA	Julien Serrano
22	FW	ESP	Jordi Mboula
23	FW	ITA	Pietro Pellegri
24	DF	ITA	Andrea Raggi
25	DF	POL	Kamil Glik
26	MF	BRA	Gabriel Boschilia
27	MF	FRA	Thomas Lemar
28	MF	MLI	Adama Traoré
30	GK	SEN	Seydou Sy
35	DF	FRA	Kévin N'Doram
38	DF	MLI	Almamy Touré
40	GK	FRA	Loïc Badiashile

=== Out on loan ===
Note: Flags indicate national team as defined under FIFA eligibility rules; some limited exceptions apply. Players may hold more than one non-FIFA nationality.

No.	Pos.	Nation	Player
4	DF	NED	Terence Kongolo (on loan to Huddersfield Town)
18	MF	FRA	Soualiho Meïté (on loan to Bordeaux)
23	DF	FRA	Pierre-Daniel N'Guinda (on loan to US Quevilly-Rouen)
—	GK	FRA	Paul Nardi (on loan to Cercle Brugge)
—	DF	FRA	Jordy Gaspar (on loan to Cercle Brugge)
—	DF	POR	Rúben Vinagre (on loan to Wolverhampton Wanderers)
—	MF	FRA	Tristan Muyumba (on loan to Cercle Brugge)
—	MF	FRA	Jonathan Mexique (on loan to Cercle Brugge)

No.	Pos.	Nation	Player
—	MF	FRA	Guevin Tormin (on loan to Cercle Brugge)
—	MF	MAR	Youssef Aït Bennasser (on loan to Caen)
—	MF	POR	Gil Dias (on loan to Fiorentina)
—	FW	FRA	Irvin Cardona (on loan to Cercle Brugge)
—	FW	FRA	Kylian Mbappé (on loan to Paris Saint-Germain)
—	FW	CIV	Lacina Traoré (on loan to Amiens)
—	FW	FRA	Ilyes Chaïbi (on loan to Wacker Innsbruck)

== Transfers ==
=== In ===
Date	Position	Nationality	Name	From	Fee	Ref.
24 May 2017†	FW	(Montenegro)	Stevan Jovetić	Inter Milan	Undisclosed	
24 May 2017†	MF	(Belgium)	Youri Tielemans	Anderlecht	€25 million	
16 June 2017†	DF	(France)	Jordy Gaspar	Lyon	Undisclosed	
16 June 2017†	GK	(Switzerland)	Diego Benaglio	VfL Wolfsburg	Undisclosed	
17 June 2017	MF	(France)	Soualiho Meïté	Zulte-Waregem	€8 million	
21 June 2017†	FW	(Spain)	Jordi Mboula	Barcelona	Undisclosed	
3 July 2017	DF	(Netherlands)	Terence Kongolo	Feyenoord	€12 million	
11 July 2017	GK	(Spain)	Álvaro Fernández	Osasuna	Undisclosed	
2 August 2017	FW	(France)	Adama Diakhaby	Rennes	€10 million	
8 August 2017	MF	(Algeria)	Rachid Ghezzal	Lyon	Free	
29 August 2017	MF	(Senegal)	Keita Baldé	Lazio	€30 million	
27 January 2018	FW	(Italy)	Pietro Pellegri	Genoa	€25 million	

† Transfers arranged on the above dates, but were not finalised until 1 July.

=== Out ===
Date	Position	Nationality	Name	To	Fee	Ref.
26 May 2017†	MF	(Portugal)	Bernardo Silva	Manchester City	€50 million	
16 June 2017†	MF	(Morocco)	Nabil Dirar	Fenerbahçe	€4.5 million	
24 June 2017†	FW	(France)	Valère Germain	Marseille	Undisclosed	
3 July 2017	FW	(France)	Corentin Jean	Toulouse	Undisclosed	
14 July 2017	DF	(France)	Abdou Diallo	Mainz 05	Undisclosed	
15 July 2017	MF	(France)	Tiémoué Bakayoko	Chelsea	£40 million	
24 July 2017	DF	(France)	Benjamin Mendy	Manchester City	£52 million	
7 August 2017	MF	(France)	Allan Saint-Maximin	Nice	€10 million	
26 January 2018	FW	(Argentina)	Guido Carrillo	Southampton	£19 million	

† Transfers arranged on the above dates, but were not finalised until 1 July.

=== Loans out ===
Date from	Position	Nationality	Name	To	Date to	Ref.
16 June 2017	GK	(France)	Paul Nardi	Cercle Brugge	End of season	
23 June 2017	MF	(France)	Jonathan Mexique	Cercle Brugge	End of season	
23 June 2017	MF	(France)	Guevin Tormin	Cercle Brugge	End of season	
29 June 2017	MF	(France)	Tristan Muyumba	Cercle Brugge	End of season	
18 July 2017	DF	(France)	Jordy Gaspar	Cercle Brugge	End of season	
18 July 2017	FW	(France)	Irvin Cardona	Cercle Brugge	End of season	
18 July 2017	DF	(Portugal)	Rúben Vinagre	Wolverhampton Wanderers	End of season	
15 August 2017	MF	(Portugal)	Gil Dias	Fiorentina	Two season loan	
31 August 2017	FW	(France)	Kylian Mbappé	Paris Saint-Germain	End of season	
31 August 2017	FW	(Ivory Coast)	Lacina Traoré	Amiens	End of season	
7 July 2017	DF	(Nigeria)	Elderson Echiéjilé	Sivasspor	End of season	
2 January 2018	DF	(Netherlands)	Terence Kongolo	Huddersfield Town	End of season	
2 January 2018	MF	(France)	Soualiho Meïté	Bordeaux	End of season	
30 January 2018	FW	(France)	Ilyes Chaïbi	Wacker Innsbruck	End of season	
January 2018	DF	(France)	Pierre-Daniel N'Guinda	Quevilly-Rouen	End of season	

== Friendlies ==
7 July 2017	St. Pölten	0–3	Monaco	Sankt Pölten, Austria
18:00 CEST (UTC+2)		Report	Lopes 36'; Sylla 54'; Mboula 71'	Stadium: NV Arena

9 July 2017	Rapid Wien	2–2	Monaco	Vienna, Austria
17:30 CEST (UTC+2)	Schwab 54'; Thurnwald 71'	Report	Lopes 15'; Carrillo 52'	Stadium: Allianz Stadion

15 July 2017	Monaco	4–2	Stoke City	Martigny, Switzerland
16:30 CEST (UTC+2)	Fabinho 34' (pen.); Saint-Maximin 39'; Falcao 67'; N'Doram 71'	Report	Berahino 10'; Diouf 47'	Stadium: Stade d'Octodure; Referee: Stephan Klossner (Switzerland)

16 July 2017	Monaco	0–0	PSV Eindhoven	Bagnes, Switzerland
		Report		Stadium: Stade Saint-Marc

19 July 2017	Monaco	1–1	Fenerbahçe	Montreux, Switzerland
19:00 CEST (UTC+2)	Lemar 53'; Glik (yellow card) 78'	Report	Özbayraklı (yellow card) 36'; Stoch 78'	Stadium: Stade de Chailly

22 July 2017	Sporting CP	2–1	Monaco	Lisbon, Portugal
20:30 CEST (UTC+2)	Fernandes 32'; Dost 43'	Report	Carrillo 90+1'	Stadium: Estádio José Alvalade

31 August 2017	Monaco	4–1	Nîmes	Monaco
12:00 CEST (UTC+2)	Carrillo 14', 60'; Mboula 22'; Appin 75'	Report	Depres 28'	Stadium: Stade Louis II

23 March 2018	Monaco	4–1	Genoa	Monaco
17:00 CET (UTC+1)	Sylla 7'; Diakhaby 17', 81'; Jorge 90+2'	Report	Lapadula 14'	Stadium: Stade Louis II

== Competitions ==
=== Trophée des Champions ===
29 July 2017	Monaco	1–2	Paris Saint-Germain	Tangier, Morocco
20:00 CEST (UTC+02:00)	Sidibé 30', (yellow card) 50'; Glik (yellow card) 53'; Fabinho (yellow card) 82'	Report	Dani Alves 51'; Rabiot 63'; Verratti (yellow card) 82'	Stadium: Grand Stade de Tanger; Attendance: 43,761; Referee: Noureddine El Jaafari (Morocco)

=== Ligue 1 ===
==== League table ====
Pos	Team	Pld	W	D	L	GF	GA	GD	Pts	Qualification or relegation
1	Paris Saint-Germain (C)	38	29	6	3	108	29	+79	93	Qualification for the Champions League group stage
2	Monaco	38	24	8	6	85	45	+40	80	Qualification for the Champions League group stage
3	Lyon	38	23	9	6	87	43	+44	78	Qualification for the Champions League group stage
4	Marseille	38	22	11	5	80	47	+33	77	Qualification for the Europa League group stage (Note: Since the winners of the 2017–18 Coupe de France and the 2017–18 Coupe de la Ligue, Paris Saint-Germain, qualified for European competition based on league position, the spot awarded to the Coupe de France winners (Europa League group stage) was passed to the fourth-placed team and the spot awarded to the Coupe de la Ligue winners (Europa League third qualifying round) was passed to the sixth-placed team. The fifth-placed team received the spot in Europa League third qualifying round originally designated to the fourth-placed team.)
5	Rennes	38	16	10	12	50	44	+6	58	Qualification for the Europa League group stage

Source: Ligue 1 and Soccerway
Rules for classification: 1) Points; 2) Goal difference; 3) Head-to-head points; 4) Head-to-head goal difference; 5) Head-to-head goals scored; 6) Head-to-head away goals; 7) Goals scored; 8) Away goals scored; 9) Most goals scored in one league match; 10) Fair-play points
(C) Champions

==== Results summary ====
Overall								Home						Away					
Pld	W	D	L	GF	GA	GD	Pts	W	D	L	GF	GA	GD	W	D	L	GF	GA	GD
38	24	8	6	85	45	+40	80	15	3	1	47	17	+30	9	5	5	38	28	+10

Last updated: 19 May 2018.
Source: Results

==== Results by round ====
Round	1	2	3	4	5	6	7	8	9	10	11	12	13	14	15	16	17	18	19	20	21	22	23	24	25	26	27	28	29	30	31	32	33	34	35	36	37	38
Ground	H	A	A	H	A	H	A	H	A	H	A	H	A	H	A	H	H	A	H	A	H	H	A	H	A	H	A	H	A	H	A	H	A	A	H	A	H	A
Result	W	W	W	W	L	W	W	D	L	W	W	W	D	L	L	W	W	W	W	D	D	W	D	W	W	W	D	W	W	W	D	W	L	L	D	W	W	W
Position	6	3	2	2	2	2	2	2	2	2	2	2	2	3	4	3	3	2	2	2	4	4	4	3	2	2	2	2	2	2	2	2	2	2	3	3	2	2

Source: Results
A = Away; H = Home; W = Win; D = Draw; L = Loss

==== Matches ====
4 August 2017 1	Monaco	3–2	Toulouse	Monaco
20:45 CEST (UTC+02:00)	Jemerson 28'; Moutinho (yellow card) 49'; Falcao 58'; Glik 70'	Report	Machach 6', (yellow card) 30'; Sangaré (yellow card) 25'; Delort 53'; Moubandje (yellow card) 81'	Stadium: Stade Louis II; Attendance: 13,572; Referee: Clément Turpin

13 August 2017 2	Dijon	1–4	Monaco	Dijon
17:00 CEST (UTC+02:00)	Saïd 43'	Report	Falcao 3', 37', 51'; Jemerson 25'; Moutinho (yellow card) 62'; Sidibé (yellow card) 75'	Stadium: Stade Gaston Gérard; Attendance: 14,295; Referee: Tony Chapron

18 August 2017 3	Metz	0–1	Monaco	Metz
20:45 CEST (UTC+02:00)	Poblete (yellow card) 21'; Rivierez (yellow card) 64'	Report	Jorge (yellow card) 37'; Falcao 78'	Stadium: Stade Saint-Symphorien; Attendance: 18,136; Referee: François Letexier

27 August 2017 4	Monaco	6–1	Marseille	Monaco
20:00 CEST (UTC+02:00)	Glik 2', (yellow card) 28'; Falcao 20' (pen.), 34'; Diakhaby 45'; Fabinho (yellow card) 56', (goal) 79' (pen.); Sidibé 68'	Report	Sanson (yellow card) 4'; Luiz Gustavo (yellow card) 34'; Hubočan (yellow card) 43'; Cabella 75'	Stadium: Stade Louis II; Attendance: 16,353; Referee: Ruddy Buquet

9 September 2017 5	Nice	4–0	Monaco	Nice
17:00 CEST (UTC+02:00)	Balotelli 6' (pen.), 60', (yellow card) 69'; Pléa 18'; Ganago 85'; Jallet (yellow card) 11'	Report	Sidibé (yellow card) 5'; Jorge (yellow card) 14'	Stadium: Allianz Riviera; Attendance: 28,995; Referee: Clément Turpin

16 September 2017 6	Monaco	3–0	Strasbourg	Monaco
17:00 CEST (UTC+02:00)	Lopes 44'; Falcao 51', 67'; Sidibé (yellow card) 73'; Jorge (yellow card) 84'	Report	Martin (yellow card) 1'; Mangane (yellow card) 63'	Stadium: Stade Louis II; Attendance: 8,310; Referee: Johan Hamel

22 September 2017 7	Lille	0–4	Monaco	Villeneuve-d'Ascq
20:45 CEST (UTC+02:00)	Ponce (yellow card) 88'	Report	Jovetić 24'; Ghezzal 30', (yellow card) 60'; Falcao 48', 73' (pen.); Jemerson (yellow card) 70'	Stadium: Stade Pierre-Mauroy; Attendance: 34,146; Referee: Frank Schneider

29 September 2017 8	Monaco	1–1	Montpellier	Monaco
20:45 CEST (UTC+02:00)	Fabinho (yellow card) 36'; Falcao 38'; Jemerson (yellow card) 53'; Touré (yellow card) 55'	Report	Skhiri (yellow card) 18'; Camara 90+2'	Stadium: Stade Louis II; Attendance: 7,053; Referee: Tony Chapron

13 October 2017 9	Lyon	3–2	Monaco	Décines-Charpieu
20:45 CEST (UTC+02:00)	Mariano 11'; Fekir 23', 90+5', (yellow card) 45'; Yanga-Mbiwa (yellow card) 48'; A. Lopes (yellow card) 52'; Diakhaby (yellow card) 68'	Report	R. Lopes 17'; Traoré 34', (yellow card) 55'	Stadium: Parc Olympique Lyonnais; Attendance: 43,295; Referee: Benoît Bastien

21 October 2017 10	Monaco	2–0	Caen	Monaco
17:00 CEST (UTC+02:00)	Keita 21', (yellow card) 63'; Falcao 59' (pen.); Fabinho (yellow card) 67'; Jemerson (yellow card) 86'	Report	Guilbert (yellow card) 50'; Féret (yellow card) 62'	Stadium: Stade Louis II; Attendance: 8,040; Referee: Thomas Leonard

28 October 2017 11	Bordeaux	0–2	Monaco	Bordeaux
17:00 CEST (UTC+02:00)	Vada (yellow card) 67'; Mendy (yellow card) 86'	Report	Keita 57'; Lemar 65'	Stadium: Nouveau Stade de Bordeaux; Attendance: 28,831; Referee: Antony Gautier

4 November 2017 12	Monaco	6–0	Guingamp	Monaco
20:00 CET (UTC+01:00)	Carrillo 10', 77'; Traoré 27', 75'; Keita 36'; Fabinho 45+1' (pen.); Touré (yellow card) 70'	Report	Deaux (yellow card) 34'	Stadium: Stade Louis II; Attendance: 7,066; Referee: Mikael Lesage

17 November 2017 13	Amiens	1–1	Monaco	Amiens
20:45 CET (UTC+01:00)	Zungu (yellow card) 2'; Gakpé 31'; Konaté (yellow card) 90+3'	Report	Jemerson (yellow card) 21'; Jovetić 67'; Glik (yellow card) 76'; Jorge (yellow card) 90+3'	Stadium: Stade de la Licorne; Attendance: 9,198; Referee: Jérôme Miguelgorry

26 November 2017 14	Monaco	1–2	Paris Saint-Germain	Monaco
21:00 CET (UTC+01:00)	Jorge (yellow card) 9'; Jemerson (yellow card) 30'; Touré (yellow card) 51'; Moutinho 81'	Report	Cavani 19'; Kurzawa (yellow card) 25'; Neymar (yellow card) 45', (goal) 52' (pen.); Dani Alves (yellow card) 90'; Berchiche (yellow card) 90+2'	Stadium: Stade Louis II; Attendance: 16,588; Referee: François Letexier

29 November 2017 15	Nantes	1–0	Monaco	Nantes
19:00 CET (UTC+01:00)	Lucas Lima 90+2'	Report		Stadium: Stade de la Beaujoire; Attendance: 24,800; Referee: Benoît Millot

2 December 2017 16	Monaco	1–0	Angers	Monaco
20:00 CET (UTC+01:00)	Falcao 2'; N'Doram (yellow card) 49'; Moutinho (yellow card) 87'; Subašić (yellow card) 90+3'	Report	Mangani (yellow card) 47'; Crivelli (yellow card) 57'; Fulgini (yellow card) 84'	Stadium: Stade Louis II; Attendance: 6,545; Referee: Antony Gautier

9 December 2017 17	Monaco	3–2	Troyes	Monaco
20:00 CET (UTC+01:00)	Glik (yellow card) 21'; Jorge (yellow card) 42'; Deplagne 70' (o.g.); Fabinho (yellow card) 72'; Falcao (yellow card) 72'; Carrillo 85', 88'	Report	Suk (yellow card) 7', (goal) 25', 50'; Darbion (yellow card) 64'; Hérelle (yellow card) 72'; Niane (yellow card) 72'; Vizcarrondo (yellow card) 90+3'	Stadium: Stade Louis II; Attendance: 8,935; Referee: Frank Schneider

15 December 2017 18	Saint-Étienne	0–4	Monaco	Saint-Étienne
20:45 CET (UTC+01:00)	Ruffier (red card) 53'; Pajot (yellow card) 73'	Report	Sidibé 4'; Lemar 32'; Fabinho 53'; Keita 61'	Stadium: Stade Geoffroy-Guichard; Attendance: 23,107; Referee: Amaury Delerue

20 December 2017 19	Monaco	2–1	Rennes	Monaco
20:50 CET (UTC+01:00)	Falcao 20'; Sidibé (yellow card) 58'; Fabinho (yellow card) 63'; Keita 81'; Glik (yellow card) 90+1'	Report	Gelin (yellow card) 48'; Khazri 59' (pen.); Gnagnon (yellow card) 88'	Stadium: Stade Louis II; Attendance: 7,542; Referee: Benoît Bastien

13 January 2018 20	Montpellier	0–0	Monaco	Montpellier
20:00 CET (UTC+01:00)	Skhiri (yellow card) 30'; Mendes (yellow card) 72'; Aguilar (yellow card) 85'; Hilton (yellow card) 89'; Dolly (yellow card) 90+3'	Report	Jorge (yellow card) 61'	Stadium: Stade de la Mosson; Attendance: 14,643; Referee: Antony Gautier

16 January 2018 21	Monaco	2–2	Nice	Monaco
21:00 CET (UTC+01:00)	Glik (yellow card) 18'; Diakhaby 33', (yellow card) 75'; Keita (yellow card) 53'; Moutinho (yellow card) 62'; Falcao 90+2'	Report	Pléa (yellow card) 34'; Cyprien (yellow card) 34'; Balotelli 47', 68', (yellow card) 61'; Le Marchand (yellow card) 57'	Stadium: Stade Louis II; Attendance: 10,533; Referee: François Letexier

21 January 2018 22	Monaco	3–1	Metz	Monaco
17:00 CET (UTC+01:00)	Jorge 45+2'; Raggi (yellow card) 65'; Ghezzal 67'; Lopes 81'	Report	Niakhate (yellow card) 41'; Kawashima (red card) 50'; Niane 72'	Stadium: Stade Louis II; Attendance: 6,333; Referee: Mikael Lesage

28 January 2018 23	Marseille	2–2	Monaco	Marseille
21:00 CET (UTC+01:00)	Rami 7'; Payet (yellow card) 36'; Germain 47'; Sanson (yellow card) 70'; Sarr (yellow card) 85'	Report	Keita 4'; Glik (yellow card) 33'; Ghezzal (yellow card) 45+2'; Fabinho 51'	Stadium: Stade Vélodrome; Attendance: 51,279; Referee: Antony Gautier

4 February 2018 24	Monaco	3–2	Lyon	Monaco
21:00 CET (UTC+01:00)	Keita 31', (yellow card) 40' (yellow-red card) 44'; Falcao 37'; R. Lopes 88'; Sy (yellow card) 90+1'	Report	Mariano 12'; Traoré 27'; Tete (yellow card) 31'; Mendy (yellow card) 35'; Ndombele (yellow card) 41'	Stadium: Stade Louis II; Attendance: 10,301; Referee: Benoît Bastien

10 February 2018 25	Angers	0–4	Monaco	Angers
20:00 CET (UTC+01:00)	Thomas (yellow card) 13'	Report	Butelle 10' (o.g.); Jovetić 30', 65'; Raggi 71'	Stadium: Stade Raymond Kopa; Attendance: 12,759; Referee: Thomas Léonard

16 February 2018 26	Monaco	4–0	Dijon	Monaco
20:45 CET (UTC+01:00)	Keita 13'; Tielemans (yellow card) 39'; Glik (yellow card) 56', (goal) 90+2'; Fabinho 69' (pen.); Lopes 87'	Report	Yambéré (yellow card) 65'	Stadium: Stade Louis II; Attendance: 6,418; Referee: Johan Hamel

24 February 2018 27	Toulouse	3–3	Monaco	Toulouse
17:00 CET (UTC+01:00)	Sangaré 24'; Delort 78' (pen.), (yellow card) 85'; Sanogo 87'	Report	Lopes 8', 47'; Jovetić 72', (yellow card) 90+2'; Lemar (yellow card) 83'; Fabinho (yellow card) 90+1'	Stadium: Stadium Municipal; Attendance: 13,184; Referee: Benoît Millot

2 March 2018 28	Monaco	2–1	Bordeaux	Monaco
20:45 CET (UTC+01:00)	Jovetić 45'; Lopes 69'	Report	Vada 32'; Youssouf (yellow card) 73'	Stadium: Stade Louis II; Attendance: 7,419; Referee: Ruddy Buquet

9 March 2018 29	Strasbourg	1–3	Monaco	Strasbourg
20:45 CET (UTC+01:00)	Bahoken 20'	Report	Jovetić 5'; Lopes 21', (yellow card) 68'; Fabinho 41'	Stadium: Stade de la Meinau; Attendance: 23,814; Referee: Antony Gautier

16 March 2018 30	Monaco	2–1	Lille	Monaco
20:45 CET (UTC+01:00)	Lopes 43'; Jovetić 60'; Moutinho (yellow card) 67'; Subašić (yellow card) 90+2'	Report	Mothiba 16'	Stadium: Stade Louis II; Attendance: 7,147; Referee: Clément Turpin

4 April 2018 31	Rennes	1–1	Monaco	Rennes
18:45 CEST (UTC+02:00)	Gnagnon 20'	Report	Lopes 29'; Jemerson (yellow card) 75'; N'Doram (yellow card) 88'	Stadium: Roazhon Park; Attendance: 17,448; Referee: Amaury Delerue

7 April 2018 32	Monaco	2–1	Nantes	Monaco
17:00 CEST (UTC+02:00)	Jorge (yellow card) 38'; Falcao 42'; Lopes 45'; Glik (yellow card) 59'; Jemerson (yellow card) 73'; Subašić (yellow card) 90+4'	Report	Thomasson 32'; Krhin (yellow card) 48'; Dubois (yellow card) 87'; Sala (yellow card) 90+4'	Stadium: Stade Louis II; Attendance: 8,557; Referee: François Letexier

15 April 2018 33	Paris Saint-Germain	7–1	Monaco	Paris
21:00 CEST (UTC+02:00)	Lo Celso 15', 27'; Cavani 17'; Di María 19', 58'; Pastore (yellow card) 40'; Falcao 76' (o.g.); Draxler 86'	Report	Lopes 38'; Fabinho (yellow card) 61'; Raggi (yellow card) 61'; Moutinho (yellow card) 78'	Stadium: Parc des Princes; Attendance: 46,869; Referee: Ruddy Buquet

21 April 2018 34	Guingamp	3–1	Monaco	Guingamp
20:00 CEST (UTC+02:00)	Briand 22' (pen.); Didot 34'; Thuram 47'	Report	Jemerson (red card) 21'; Diakhaby (yellow card) 23'; Touré 63'; Fabinho (yellow card) 64'	Stadium: Stade de Roudourou; Attendance: 14,968; Referee: Benoît Millot

28 April 2018 35	Monaco	0–0	Amiens	Monaco
20:00 CEST (UTC+02:00)	Sylla (yellow card) 87'; Diakhaby (red card) 90+1'	Report	El Hajjam (yellow card) 70'; Zungu (yellow card) 76'; Gouano (red card) 90+1'	Stadium: Stade Louis II; Attendance: 8,164; Referee: Mikael Lesage

6 May 2018 36	Caen	1–2	Monaco	Caen
18:00 CEST (UTC+02:00)	Santini (yellow card) 33', (goal) 40'; Genevois (red card) 77'	Report	Sylla 12', 90+1'; N'Doram (yellow card) 50'; Raggi (yellow card) 66'	Stadium: Stade Michel d'Ornano; Attendance: 17,468; Referee: Ruddy Buquet

12 May 2018 37	Monaco	1–0	Saint-Étienne	Monaco
21:00 CEST (UTC+02:00)	Serrano (yellow card) 7'; Fabinho 90+1' (pen.); Ghezzal (red card) 90+4'	Report	Théophile-Catherine (yellow card) 41'	Stadium: Stade Louis II; Attendance: 10,742; Referee: Benoît Bastien

19 May 2018 38	Troyes	0–3	Monaco	Troyes
21:00 CEST (UTC+02:00)	Hérelle (yellow card) 68'	Report	Lopes 22', 71', (yellow card) 89'; Mboula 90+3'	Stadium: Stade de l'Aube; Attendance: 14,585; Referee: Clément Turpin

=== Coupe de France ===
6 January 2018 Round of 64	Yzeure	2–5	Monaco	Moulins
18:00 CET (UTC+01:00)	Seck 28' (pen.), (yellow card) 33'; Hardouin 44'; Millieras (yellow card) 52'; Sohier (yellow card) 59'	Report	Carrillo 1', 49', 84'; Jovetić 39'; N'Doram (yellow card) 42'; Fabinho 54' (pen.), (yellow card) 55'; Lemar (yellow card) 79'	Stadium: Stade Hector Rolland; Attendance: 3,500; Referee: Aurelien Petit

24 January 2018 Round of 32	Monaco	2–3	Lyon	Monaco
21:05 CET (UTC+01:00)	Jovetić 13'; R. Lopes 71'; Tielemans (yellow card) 74'	Report	Ferri (yellow card) 12'; Traoré 21'; Mariano 25', 55'; Tete (yellow card) 73'	Stadium: Stade Louis II; Attendance: 7,143; Referee: Ruddy Buquet

=== Coupe de la Ligue ===
12 December 2017 Round of 16	Monaco	2–0	Caen	Monaco
21:05 CET (UTC+01:00)	Carrillo 33'; Raggi (yellow card) 40'; Falcao 85'	Report	Diomandé (yellow card) 24'; Santini (yellow card) 42'; Mbengue (yellow card) 45+1'	Stadium: Stade Louis II; Attendance: 4,834; Referee: Thomas Léonard

9 January 2018 Quarter-finals	Nice	1–2	Monaco	Nice
21:00 CET (UTC+01:00)	Burner (yellow card) 12'; Pléa 18'	Report	Lemar 2'; Diakhaby 37', (yellow card) 45'; Lopes (yellow card) 80'	Stadium: Allianz Riviera; Attendance: 19,686; Referee: Clément Turpin

31 January 2018 Semi-finals	Monaco	2–0	Montpellier	Monaco
21:05 CET (UTC+01:00)	Falcao 15', 29'; Fabinho (yellow card) 55'; Boschilia (yellow card) 60'	Report	Mendes (yellow card) 25'	Stadium: Stade Louis II; Attendance: 6,024; Referee: Amaury Delerue

31 March 2018 Final	Paris Saint-Germain	3–0	Monaco	Bordeaux
21:05 CEST (UTC+02:00)	Cavani 8' (pen.), 85'; Di María 21'	Report	Glik (yellow card) 31'; Falcao (yellow card) 65'; Raggi (yellow card) 75'	Stadium: Nouveau Stade de Bordeaux; Attendance: 41,248; Referee: Clément Turpin

=== UEFA Champions League ===
==== Group stage ====
Pos	Team	Pld	W	D	L	GF	GA	GD	Pts	Qualification	BES	POR	RBL	MON
1	(Turkey) Beşiktaş	6	4	2	0	11	5	+6	14	Advance to knockout phase	—	1–1	2–0	1–1
2	(Portugal) Porto	6	3	1	2	15	10	+5	10	Advance to knockout phase	1–3	—	3–1	5–2
3	(Germany) RB Leipzig	6	2	1	3	10	11	−1	7	Transfer to Europa League	1–2	3–2	—	1–1
4	(France) Monaco	6	0	2	4	6	16	−10	2		1–2	0–3	1–4	—

Source: UEFA

13 September 2017 1	RB Leipzig (Germany)	1–1	(France) Monaco	Leipzig, Germany
20:45 CEST (UTC+02:00)	Demme (yellow card) 26'; Forsberg 33'; Halstenberg (yellow card) 72'	Report	Tielemans (yellow card) 10', (goal) 34'; Sidibé (yellow card) 81'; Jemerson (yellow card) 87'	Stadium: Red Bull Arena; Attendance: 40,068; Referee: Michael Oliver (England)

26 September 2017 2	Monaco (France)	0–3	(Portugal) Porto	Monaco
20:45 CEST (UTC+02:00)	Diakhaby (yellow card) 9'; Fabinho (yellow card) 33'; Sidibé (yellow card) 83'	Report	Aboubakar 31', 69'; Herrera (yellow card) 34'; Oliveira (yellow card) 62'; D. Pereira (yellow card) 66'; Casillas (yellow card) 87'; Layún 89'	Stadium: Stade Louis II; Attendance: 11,703; Referee: Slavko Vinčić (Slovenia)

17 October 2017 3	Monaco (France)	1–2	(Turkey) Beşiktaş	Monaco
20:45 CEST (UTC+02:00)	Falcao 30'; Keita (yellow card) 49'	Report	Pepe (yellow card) 16'; Tosun 34', 54'; Arslan (yellow card) 36'	Stadium: Stade Louis II; Attendance: 7,403; Referee: Milorad Mažić (Serbia)

1 November 2017 4	Beşiktaş (Turkey)	1–1	(France) Monaco	Istanbul, Turkey
18:00 CET (UTC+01:00)	Arslan (yellow card) 25'; Tosun 54' (pen.); Tośić (yellow card) 65'; Quaresma (yellow card) 88'; Medel (yellow card) 90+1'	Report	Lopes (yellow card) 27', (goal) 45+1'; Jorge (yellow card) 53'; Diakhaby (yellow card) 90+3'	Stadium: Vodafone Park; Attendance: 39,346; Referee: Paolo Tagliavento (Italy)

21 November 2017 5	Monaco (France)	1–4	(Germany) RB Leipzig	Monaco
20:45 CET (UTC+01:00)	Moutinho (yellow card) 37'; Falcao 43'; Jemerson (yellow card) 46'; Fabinho (yellow card) 49'; Jorge (yellow card) 85'	Report	Jemerson 6' (o.g.); Werner 9', 31' (pen.); N. Keïta 45'; Poulsen (yellow card) 84'	Stadium: Stade Louis II; Attendance: 9,029; Referee: Alberto Undiano Mallenco (Spain)

6 December 2017 6	Porto (Portugal)	5–2	(France) Monaco	Porto, Portugal
20:45 CET (UTC+01:00)	André (yellow card) 7'; Aboubakar 9', 33'; Felipe (red card) 38'; Brahimi 45'; Telles 65'; Soares 88'	Report	Ghezzal (red card) 38'; Glik 61' (pen.); Falcao 78'	Stadium: Estádio do Dragão; Attendance: 42,509; Referee: Jonas Eriksson (Sweden)

== Statistics ==
=== Appearances and goals ===
As of match played 19 May 2018

No.	Pos	Nat	Player	Total		Ligue 1		Coupe de France		Coupe de la Ligue		Champions League		Trophée des Champions	
No.	Pos	Nat	Player	Apps	Goals	Apps	Goals	Apps	Goals	Apps	Goals	Apps	Goals	Apps	Goals
1	GK	(Croatia) CRO	Danijel Subašić	40	0	34	0	0	0	2	0	3	0	1	0
2	MF	(Brazil) BRA	Fabinho	46	8	34	7	2	1	4	0	5	0	1	0
5	DF	(Brazil) BRA	Jemerson	44	3	33	2	1	0	3	0	6	1	1	0
6	DF	(Brazil) BRA	Jorge	27	1	22	1	1	0	0	0	4	0	0	0
7	MF	(Algeria) ALG	Rachid Ghezzal	35	2	7+19	2	1+1	0	1+2	0	2+2	0	0	0
8	MF	(Portugal) POR	João Moutinho	44	1	31+2	1	0+1	0	3+1	0	5+1	0	0	0
9	FW	(Colombia) COL	Radamel Falcao	36	24	25+1	18	1	0	2+1	3	4+1	3	1	0
10	FW	(Montenegro) MNE	Stevan Jovetić	21	10	7+8	8	2	2	1+2	0	0+1	0	0	0
14	FW	(Senegal) SEN	Keita Baldé	33	8	19+4	8	1+1	0	1+1	0	3+3	0	0	0
15	FW	(France) FRA	Adama Diakhaby	30	3	10+12	2	0	0	2+1	1	3+2	0	0	0
16	GK	(Switzerland) SUI	Diego Benaglio	10	0	2+1	0	2	0	2	0	3	0	0	0
17	MF	(Belgium) BEL	Youri Tielemans	35	1	18+9	0	0+1	0	1+1	0	4	1	1	0
19	DF	(France) FRA	Djibril Sidibé	35	3	25+2	2	1	0	3	0	3	0	1	1
20	MF	(Portugal) POR	Rony Lopes	50	17	32+6	15	2	1	3+1	0	3+2	1	0+1	0
21	DF	(France) FRA	Julien Serrano	4	0	3+1	0	0	0	0	0	0	0	0	0
22	FW	(Spain) ESP	Jordi Mboula	3	1	0+3	1	0	0	0	0	0	0	0	0
23	FW	(Italy) ITA	Pietro Pellegri	3	0	0+3	0	0	0	0	0	0	0	0	0
24	DF	(Italy) ITA	Andrea Raggi	28	1	18+2	1	2	0	4	0	2	0	0	0
25	DF	(Poland) POL	Kamil Glik	48	4	36	3	1	0	4	0	6	1	1	0
26	MF	(Brazil) BRA	Gabriel Boschilia	7	0	1+4	0	0	0	1	0	0+1	0	0	0
27	MF	(France) FRA	Thomas Lemar	38	3	27+3	2	0+1	0	2+1	1	3	0	1	0
28	MF	(Mali) MLI	Adama Traoré	3	3	2+1	3	0	0	0	0	0	0	0	0
30	GK	(Senegal) SEN	Seydou Sy	4	0	2+1	0	0+1	0	0	0	0	0	0	0
34	MF	(France) FRA	Moussa Sylla	5	2	3+2	2	0	0	0	0	0	0	0	0
35	MF	(France) FRA	Kévin N'Doram	16	0	7+4	0	2	0	1+1	0	1	0	0	0
38	DF	(Mali) MLI	Almamy Touré	27	1	13+7	1	2	0	1	0	3	0	1	0
Players away from the club on loan:
4	DF	(Netherlands) NED	Terence Kongolo	6	0	3	0	0	0	1	0	1	0	1	0
10	FW	(France) FRA	Kylian Mbappé	2	0	1	0	0	0	0	0	0	0	1	0
18	MF	(France) FRA	Soualiho Meïté	3	0	1+1	0	0	0	0	0	1	0	0	0
31	MF	(Portugal) POR	Gil Dias	1	0	0+1	0	0	0	0	0	0	0	0	0
Players who appeared for Monaco no longer at the club:
11	FW	(Argentina) ARG	Guido Carrillo	24	8	2+13	4	1	3	2	1	1+4	0	0+1	0
12	MF	(France) FRA	Allan Saint-Maximin	2	0	0+1	0	0	0	0	0	0	0	0+1	0

=== Goalscorers ===
As of match played 19 May 2018

Place	Position	Nation	Number	Name	Ligue 1	Coupe de France	Coupe de la Ligue	Champions League	Trophée des Champions	Total
1	FW	(Colombia)	9	Radamel Falcao	18	0	3	3	0	24
2	MF	(Portugal)	20	Rony Lopes	15	1	0	1	0	17
3	FW	(Montenegro)	10	Stevan Jovetić	8	2	0	0	0	10
4	FW	(Senegal)	14	Keita Baldé	8	0	0	0	0	8
4	DF	(Brazil)	2	Fabinho	7	1	0	0	0	8
4	FW	(Argentina)	11	Guido Carrillo	4	3	1	0	0	8
7	DF	(Poland)	25	Kamil Glik	3	0	0	1	0	4
8	MF	(Mali)	28	Adama Traoré	3	0	0	0	0	3
8	MF	(France)	27	Thomas Lemar	2	0	1	0	0	3
8	FW	(France)	15	Adama Diakhaby	2	0	1	0	0	3
8	DF	(France)	19	Djibril Sidibé	2	0	0	0	1	3
12	DF	(Brazil)	5	Jemerson	2	0	0	0	0	2
12	MF	(Algeria)	7	Rachid Ghezzal	2	0	0	0	0	2
12	MF	(France)	34	Moussa Sylla	2	0	0	0	0	2
12				Own goal	2	0	0	0	0	2
16	MF	(Portugal)	8	João Moutinho	1	0	0	0	0	1
16	DF	(Brazil)	6	Jorge	1	0	0	0	0	1
16	DF	(Italy)	24	Andrea Raggi	1	0	0	0	0	1
16	DF	(Mali)	38	Almamy Touré	1	0	0	0	0	1
16	FW	(Spain)	22	Jordi Mboula	1	0	0	0	0	1
16	MF	(Belgium)	17	Youri Tielemans	0	0	0	1	0	1
				TOTALS	84	7	6	7	0	104

=== Disciplinary record ===
As of match played 19 May 2018

N	P	Nat.	Name	Ligue 1			Coupe de France			Coupe de la Ligue			Champions League			Trophée des Champions			Total			Notes
N	P	Nat.	Name	Yellow card	Second yellow card	Red card	Yellow card	Second yellow card	Red card	Yellow card	Second yellow card	Red card	Yellow card	Second yellow card	Red card	Yellow card	Second yellow card	Red card	Yellow card	Second yellow card	Red card	Notes
1	GK	(Croatia)	Danijel Subašić	4															4			
3	DF	(Brazil)	Fabinho	6			1			1			2			1			11			
5	DF	(Brazil)	Jemerson	7	1								1						8	1		
6	DF	(Brazil)	Jorge	8									2	1					10	1		
7	MF	(Algeria)	Rachid Ghezzal	3	1										1				3	1	1	
8	MF	(Portugal)	João Moutinho	6									1						7			
9	FW	(Colombia)	Radamel Falcao	1						1									2			
10	MF	(Montenegro)	Stevan Jovetić	1															1			
14	FW	(Senegal)	Keita Baldé	3	1								1						4	1		
15	MF	(France)	Adama Diakhaby	2		1				1			2						5		1	
17	MF	(Belgium)	Youri Tielemans	1			1						1						3			
19	DF	(France)	Djibril Sidibé	4									2			1			7			
20	MF	(Portugal)	Rony Lopes	2						1			1						4			
21	DF	(France)	Julien Serrano	1															1			
24	DF	(Italy)	Andrea Raggi	3						2									5			
25	DF	(Poland)	Kamil Glik	8						1						1			10			
26	MF	(Brazil)	Gabriel Boschilia							1									1			
27	MF	(France)	Thomas Lemar	1			1												2			
28	MF	(Mali)	Adama Traoré	1															1			
30	MF	(Senegal)	Seydou Sy	1															1			
34	MF	(France)	Moussa Sylla	1															1			
35	MF	(France)	Kévin N'Doram	3			1												4			
38	DF	(Mali)	Almamy Touré	3															3			

Source: Match reports in Competitive matches
Only competitive matches
Ordered by (red card) , (second yellow card) and (yellow card)
(yellow card) = Number of bookings; (second yellow card) = Number of sending offs after a second yellow card; (red card) = Number of sending offs by a direct red card.
