= Evan Ndicka =

Ivory Coast international footballer (born 1999)

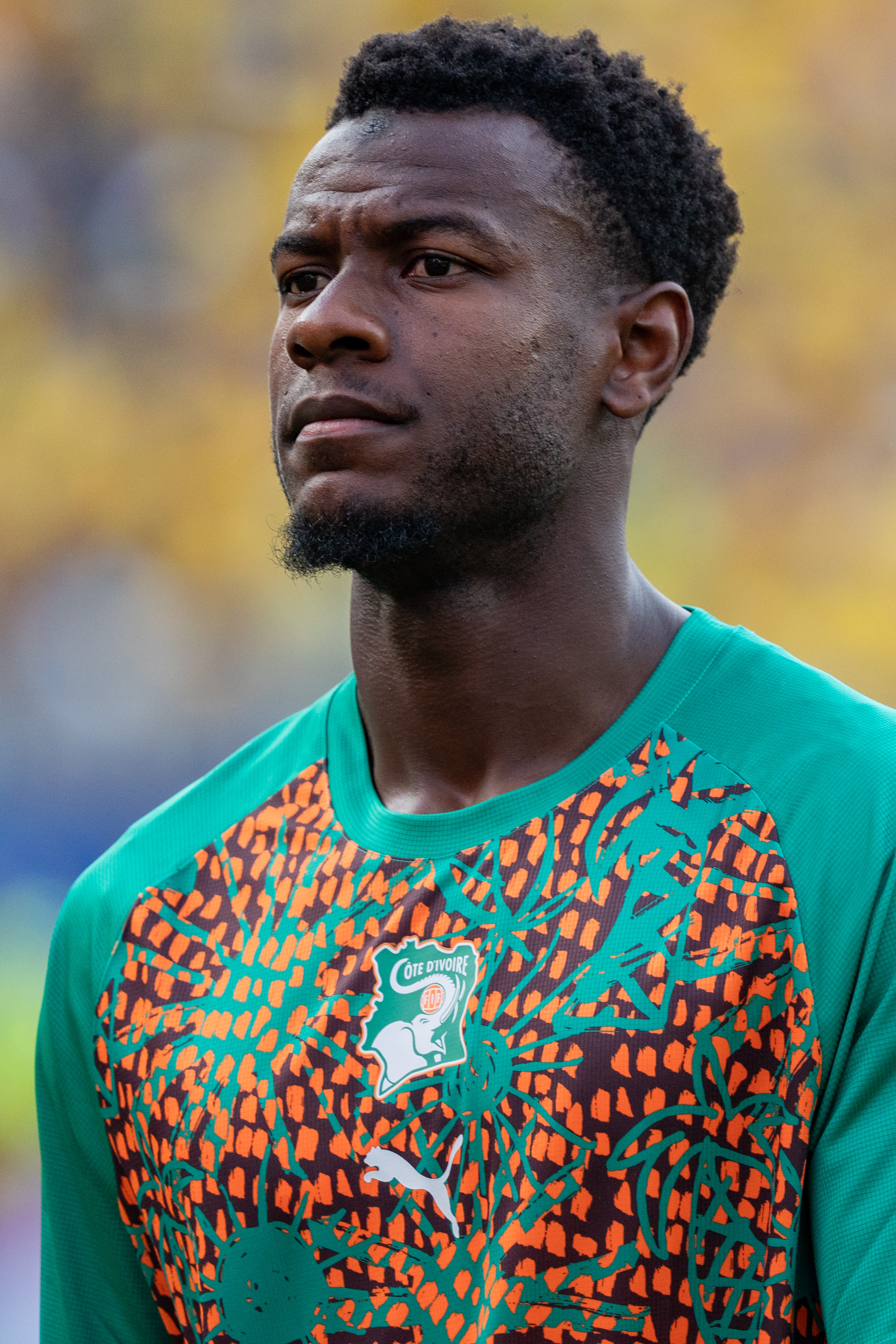
- Ndicka with the Ivory Coast in 2026

Personal information
- Full name: Obite Evan Ndicka
- Date of birth: 20 August 1999 (age 27)
- Place of birth: Paris, France
- Height: 1.92 m (6 ft 4 in)
- Position: Centre-back

Team information
- Current team: Roma
- Number: 5

Youth career
- 2006–2009: F.C.A. Paris 19ème
- 2009–2012: Solitaires Paris-Est F.C.
- 2012–2017: Auxerre

Senior career*
Years	Team	Apps	(Gls)
2017–2018	Auxerre	14	(0)
2018–2023	Eintracht Frankfurt	134	(10)
2023–	Roma	104	(4)

International career^{‡}
2014–2015	France U16	5	(0)
2016	France U17	1	(0)
2017	France U18	2	(0)
2018	France U19	1	(0)
2017–2019	France U20	10	(0)
2019	France U21	1	(0)
2023–	Ivory Coast	28	(0)
Medal record
Representing Ivory Coast
Men's football
Africa Cup of Nations
Winner	2023 Ivory Coast
- * Club domestic league appearances and goals as of 23:14, 21 November 2026 (UTC) ‡ National team caps and goals as of 28 March 2026 (UTC)

Obite Evan Ndicka (born 20 August 1999) is a professional footballer who plays as a centre-back for Serie A club Roma. Born in France, he plays for the Ivory Coast national team.

Ndicka is an academy graduate of Auxerre and made his senior debut for the club in January 2017, aged 17. He spent the next season-and-half at the club, making 14 senior appearances before joining Bundesliga side Eintracht Frankfurt in July 2018.

== Early life ==
Ndicka was born in Paris to a Cameroonian father and an Ivorian mother.

== Club career ==
=== Auxerre ===
Having joined Ligue 2 side Auxerre at the age of 13, Ndicka progressed through the club's academy and made his professional debut on 27 January 2017, starting in a 1–0 win over Clermont. He signed his first professional contract with the club on 5 February. He ultimately made 14 appearances for the club over the next season and half before signing for Bundesliga side Eintracht Frankfurt for a reported fee of €5.5m.

=== Eintracht Frankfurt ===
On 5 July 2018, Ndicka signed for German club Eintracht Frankfurt on a five-year deal. He quickly became an important member of the first-team squad and featured regularly for the club in the league and the Europa League. In February 2019, his performances earned him the Bundesliga Rookie of the Month award, a monthly title awarded to the highest performing under-23 player in a particular month, and saw him also nominated for the Rookie of the Season award. From then, he missed only one match for the remainder of the season as the club narrowly missed out on Champions League qualification.

Having been a part of the side that won the 2021–22 UEFA Europa League, in June 2023 Ndicka officially left Eintracht after five seasons, following the expiration of his contract.

=== Roma ===
On 21 June 2023, Ndicka signed for Serie A club Roma on a five-year contract. On 14 April 2024, during a match against Udinese in the Serie A at the 73rd minute, Ndicka collapsed due to chest pain; he was eventually taken away on a stretcher, although conscious. The match was abandoned fifteen minutes later with a 1–1 draw. The club stated later that Ndicka was conscious and taken to a hospital for "further checks".

On 28 November 2024, Ndicka scored his first goal for the club in a 2–2 away draw against Tottenham Hotspur in the UEFA Europa League. During the 2024–25 season, he became the first Roma outfield player since 2004 to play every minute of all 38 league matches without being substituted.

On 23 August 2025, Ndicka played the full 90 minutes in the Serie A opening match against Bologna, helping his team secure a 1–0 victory. He subsequently continued to feature regularly as a first-choice defender in the league. On 24 September 2025, he scored the opening goal with a header in a UEFA Europa League match against Nice, helping his team win 2–1.

On 22 February 2026, Ndicka played the full 90 minutes in a Serie A match against Cremonese and scored in the 77th minute, helping Roma secure a 3–0 victory. This was his first Serie A goal for Roma.

On 1 March 2026, he also scored in a match against Juventus, followed by another goal against Genoa on 8 March.

== International career ==
Ndicka represented France at U16 and U17 level and was called up to the U18 team for the first time by manager Bernard Diomède in March 2017. He then went on to play for every French youth squad up to the Under-21 national team.

In June 2023, he officially switched his allegiance to Ivory Coast, subsequently receiving his first official call-up by the senior national team for the 2023 Africa Cup of Nations qualification match against Zambia; however, he was eventually forced to withdraw from the squad, due to bureaucratic issues. He finally debuted with the Ivory Coast in a 1–0 2023 Africa Cup of Nations qualification win over Lesotho on 9 September 2023.

On 28 December 2023, he was selected from the list of 27 Ivorian players selected by Jean-Louis Gasset to compete in the 2023 Africa Cup of Nations. On 11 February 2024, he won the 2023 Africa Cup of Nations with the Ivory Coast with Coach Emerse Fae.

Ndicka was included in the list of Ivorian players selected by coach Emerse Faé to participate in the 2025 Africa Cup of Nations.

On May 15, 2026, Ndicka was integrated by Ivory Coast coach Emerse Faé into his list of 26 players to compete in the 2026 World Cup.

== Career statistics ==
=== Club ===
As of match played 21 November 2026

Appearances and goals by club, season and competition
Club	Season	League			National cup (Note: Includes Coupe de France, DFB-Pokal, Coppa Italia)		League cup (Note: Includes Coupe de la Ligue)		Europe		Other		Total	
Club	Season	Division	Apps	Goals	Apps	Goals	Apps	Goals	Apps	Goals	Apps	Goals	Apps	Goals
Auxerre	2016–17	Ligue 2	2	0	0	0	0	0	—		—		2	0
Auxerre	2017–18	Ligue 2	12	0	1	0	1	0	—		—		14	0
Auxerre	Total		14	0	1	0	1	0	—		—		16	0
Eintracht Frankfurt	2018–19	Bundesliga	27	1	0	0	—		9 (Note: Appearances in UEFA Europa League)	0	—		36	1
Eintracht Frankfurt	2019–20	Bundesliga	22	1	4	0	—		8	1	—		34	2
Eintracht Frankfurt	2020–21	Bundesliga	23	3	2	0	—		—		—		25	3
Eintracht Frankfurt	2021–22	Bundesliga	32	4	1	0	—		11	0	—		44	4
Eintracht Frankfurt	2022–23	Bundesliga	30	1	5	1	—		8 (Note: Appearances in UEFA Champions League)	0	1 (Note: Appearance in UEFA Super Cup)	0	44	2
Eintracht Frankfurt	Total		134	10	12	1	—		36	1	1	0	183	12
Roma	2023–24	Serie A	25	0	0	0	—		9	0	—		34	0
Roma	2024–25	Serie A	38	0	2	0	—		11	1	—		51	1
Roma	2025–26	Serie A	31	3	1	0	—		10	2	—		42	5
Roma	2026–27	Serie A	10	1	0	0	—		3	0	—		13	1
Roma	Total		104	4	3	0	—		33	3	—		140	7
Career total			252	14	16	1	1	0	69	4	1	0	339	19

=== International ===
As of match played 28 March 2026

Appearances and goals by national team and year
National team	Year	Apps	Goals
Ivory Coast	2023	5	0
Ivory Coast	2024	15	0
Ivory Coast	2025	5	0
Ivory Coast	2026	3	0
Total		28	0

== Honours ==
Eintracht Frankfurt

- UEFA Europa League: 2021–22
- DFB-Pokal runner-up: 2022–23
- UEFA Super Cup runner-up: 2022

Ivory Coast

- Africa Cup of Nations: 2023

Individual

- Bundesliga Team of the Season: 2021–22
- EA Sports FC Serie A Team of the Season: 2024–25, 2025–26
