= Andrea Raggi =

Italian footballer (born 1984)

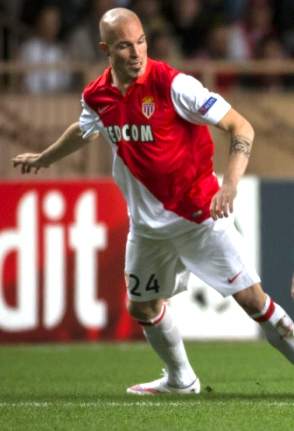
- Raggi playing for Monaco in 2014

Personal information
- Date of birth: 24 June 1984 (age 42)
- Place of birth: La Spezia, Italy
- Height: 1.87 m (6 ft 2 in)
- Position: Defender

Youth career
- 2002–2003: Empoli

Senior career*
Years	Team	Apps	(Gls)
2003–2008	Empoli	101	(2)
2003–2004	→ Carrarese (loan)	29	(1)
2008–2011	Palermo	2	(0)
2009	→ Sampdoria (loan)	13	(0)
2009–2010	→ Bologna (loan)	31	(1)
2010–2011	→ Bari (loan)	16	(0)
2011–2012	Bologna	31	(0)
2012–2019	Monaco	161	(8)
Total		374	(12)

International career
2007	Italy U21	3	(0)
- * Club domestic league appearances and goals

Andrea Raggi (Italian pronunciation: [anˈdrɛːa ˈraddʒi]; born 24 June 1984) is an Italian former professional footballer who played as a defender. He was a versatile player, being capable of playing both as a centre back and as a right back.

== Club career ==
Raggi started his footballing career with Empoli, where he spent a total of four seasons with the first team.

=== Palermo ===
On 28 May 2008, Empoli announced his sale to Palermo for €7 million on a four-year contract.

His failure to break into the first team led Palermo to send Raggi out on loan to a number of teams. In January 2009 he joined Sampdoria, then moving again to spend the whole of the 2009–10 season with Bologna.

==== Bari loan ====
In July 2010, he was loaned out for a third consecutive time, joining Bari. He was out-favoured by Giampiero Ventura in mid-season, who originally expected Raggi to play as a centre-back. Instead, Raggi was the starting right-back as Andrea Masiello, originally a right-back, remained as a temporary centre-back which Masiello already played since January 2010. He also played as a left-back to replace Alessandro Parisi against Roma on 12 December. After the closure of the winter transfer window, Parisi and Masiello re-took the full-backs position, after the signing of centre-back Kamil Glik. Raggi blamed Ventura for playing so few games.

The following August, he permanently moved to Bologna, for €200,000.

=== Monaco ===
In July 2012, Raggi moved to Monaco, and later signed a three-year contract with the team. On 19 April 2017, after defeating Borussia Dortmund 6–3 on aggregate, AS Monaco reached the semi–finals of the 2016–17 UEFA Champions League. Later that year, Raggi won the 2016–17 Ligue 1 title with the club. In September 2017, he signed a two-year contract extension on a €2 million annual salary, which would keep him at the club until June 2019, with AS Monaco confirming Raggi's departure on 28 June 2019

== International career ==
On 24 March 2007, Raggi made his International debut for the Italy U-21 side against the England U21 team in a 3–3 draw at the new Wembley Stadium.

== Career statistics ==
Appearances and goals by club, season and competition
Club	Season	League			National cup		Continental		Other		Total	
Club	Season	Division	Apps	Goals	Apps	Goals	Apps	Goals	Apps	Goals	Apps	Goals
Carrarese (loan)	2003–04	Serie C	29	1	0	0	—		—		29	1
Empoli	2004–05	Serie B	9	0	1	1	—		—		10	1
Empoli	2005–06	Serie A	24	0	0	0	—		—		24	0
Empoli	2006–07	Serie A	35	1	0	0	—		—		35	1
Empoli	2007–08	Serie A	33	1	2	0	1	0	—		36	1
Empoli	Total		101	2	3	1	1	0	0	0	105	3
Palermo	2008–09	Serie A	2	0	1	0	—		—		3	0
Sampdoria (loan)	2008–09	Serie A	13	0	3	0	1	0	—		17	0
Bologna (loan)	2009–10	Serie A	31	1	1	0	—		—		32	1
Bari (loan)	2010–11	Serie A	16	0	2	0	—		—		18	0
Bologna	2011–12	Serie A	31	0	1	1	—		—		32	1
Monaco	2012–13	Ligue 2	35	4	3	0	—		—		38	4
Monaco	2013–14	Ligue 1	28	1	5	0	—		—		33	1
Monaco	2014–15	Ligue 1	27	0	4	0	8	0	—		39	0
Monaco	2015–16	Ligue 1	31	2	4	1	9	1	—		44	4
Monaco	2016–17	Ligue 1	14	0	8	0	15	0	—		37	0
Monaco	2017–18	Ligue 1	20	1	6	0	2	0	0	0	28	1
Monaco	2018–19	Ligue 1	6	0	0	0	4	0	1	0	11	0
Monaco	Total		161	8	30	1	38	1	1	0	230	10
Career total			384	12	41	3	40	1	1	0	466	16

== Honours ==
Empoli

- Serie B: 2004–05

Monaco

- Ligue 1: 2016–17
- Ligue 2: 2012–13

Individual

- Ligue 2 Team of the Season: 2012–13
