= Loïc Badiashile =

French footballer (born 1998)

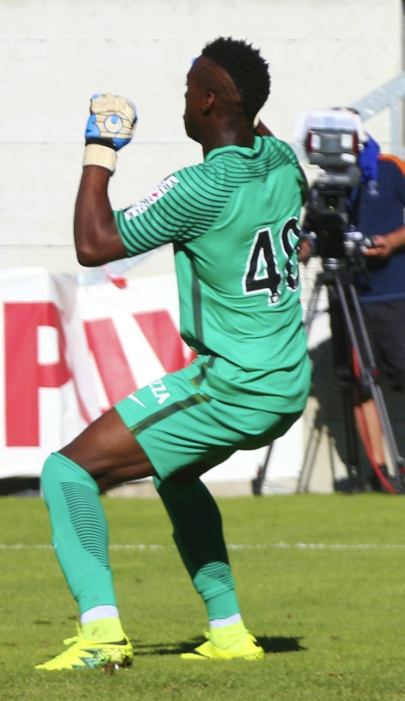
- Badiashile in 2016

Personal information
- Full name: Loïc Badiashile Mukinayi
- Date of birth: 5 February 1998 (age 28)
- Place of birth: Limoges, France
- Height: 1.86 m (6 ft 1 in)
- Position: Goalkeeper

Youth career
- 2005–2008: Limoges
- 2008–2011: SC Malesherbes
- 2011–2012: Saint-Jean-de-la-Ruelle
- 2012–2013: SC Malesherbes
- 2013–2016: Monaco

Senior career*
Years	Team	Apps	(Gls)
2016–2021	Monaco B	28	(0)
2016–2021	Monaco	1	(0)
2019	→ Rennes (loan)	0	(0)
2019–2020	→ Cercle Brugge (loan)	10	(0)
2020–2021	→ Las Rozas (loan)	24	(0)
2022	Internacional Madrid	15	(0)
2022–2023	Burgos B	6	(0)
2023–2025	Burgos	1	(0)

International career
2014	France U16	2	(0)
2015–2016	France U18	4	(0)
- * Club domestic league appearances and goals as of 8 June 2024

Loïc Badiashile Mukinayi (born 5 February 1998) is a French professional footballer who plays as a goalkeeper. He is a former France youth international.

== Club career ==
Badiashile is a youth product of AS Monaco. He made his first team debut on 27 July 2016 in a UEFA Champions League qualifier against Fenerbahçe S.K. replacing Morgan De Sanctis after 13 minutes.

He made his Ligue 1 debut on 20 May 2017 in the final match of Monaco's championship season against Rennes substituting Seydou Sy at half-time.

On 31 January 2019, the last day of the 2018–19 winter transfer window, Badiashile joined league rivals Stade Rennais F.C. on loan until the end of the season. Rennes also secured an option to make the move permanent.

On 1 July 2019, Badiashile joined Cercle Bruges on a season-long loan. On 23 September 2020, he moved to Spanish side Las Rozas CF also on loan.

Badiashile left Monaco in July 2021, after opting to not renew his contract. On 31 January 2022, after six months without a club, he returned to Spain after signing for Primera División RFEF side Internacional de Madrid.

On 30 June 2022, Badiashile signed a two-year deal with Segunda División side Burgos CF. Initially a third-choice, he became a backup in the following year, but terminated his link on 8 January 2025.

== Personal life ==
Badiashile is of Congolese descent. He is the older brother of Benoît Badiashile, who is a professional footballer for Chelsea in the Premier League.

== Career statistics ==
=== Club ===
As of match played 18 February 2023

Appearances and goals by club, season and competition
Club	Season	League			National cup		League cup		Europe		Other		Total	
Club	Season	Division	Apps	Goals	Apps	Goals	Apps	Goals	Apps	Goals	Apps	Goals	Apps	Goals
Monaco	2016–17	Ligue 1	1	0	0	0	0	0	1	0	—		2	0
Monaco	2017–18	Ligue 1	0	0	0	0	0	0	0	0	—		0	0
Monaco	2018–19	Ligue 1	0	0	1	0	2	0	1	0	—		4	0
Monaco	Total		1	0	1	0	2	0	2	0	—		6	0
Monaco B	2016–17	CFA	15	0	—		—		—		—		15	0
Monaco B	2017–18	CFA 2	8	0	—		—		—		—		8	0
Monaco B	2018–19	CFA 2	5	0	—		—		—		—		5	0
Monaco B	Total		28	0	—		—		—		—		28	0
Rennes (loan)	2018–19	Ligue 1	0	0	0	0	0	0	0	0	—		0	0
Cercle Brugge (loan)	2019–20	Belgian Pro League	10	0	0	0	—		—		—		10	0
Las Rozas (loan)	2020–21	Primera Federación	24	0	1	0	—		—		2 (Note: Appearances in Copa Federación de España)	0	25	0
Internacional Madrid	2021–22	Primera Federación	15	0	—		—		—		—		15	0
Burgos CF	2022–23	Segunda División	1	0	0	0	—		—		0	0	1	0
Career total			79	0	2	0	2	0	2	0	2	0	85	0
