= Elias Bördner =

German footballer

Personal information
- Full name: Elias Jona Bördner
- Date of birth: 18 February 2002 (age 24)
- Place of birth: Haintchen, Selters, Germany
- Height: 1.88 m (6 ft 2 in)
- Position: Goalkeeper

Team information
- Current team: Bonner SC
- Number: 1

Youth career
- 2008–2012: TuS Haintchen
- 2012–2013: SV Wolfenhausen
- 2013–2016: Wehen Wiesbaden
- 2016–2017: TSG Wieseck
- 2017–2021: Eintracht Frankfurt

Senior career*
Years	Team	Apps	(Gls)
2021–2022	Eintracht Frankfurt	1	(0)
2021–2022	→ Viktoria Köln (loan)	6	(0)
2022–2024	Viktoria Köln	2	(0)
2024–2025	Alemannia Aachen	13	(0)
2025–	Bonner SC	32	(0)
- * Club domestic league appearances and goals as of 23 September 2026

Elias Jona Bördner (born 18 February 2002) is a German footballer who plays as a goalkeeper for Regionalliga West club Bonner SC.

== Career ==
In February 2021, Bördner signed his first professional contract with Eintracht Frankfurt, lasting two years until 30 June 2023. He made his professional debut for Frankfurt in the Bundesliga on 22 May 2021, starting in the home match against SC Freiburg.

On 10 May 2022, he agreed to move to Viktoria Köln on a permanent basis after playing there on loan in the 2021–22 season.

On 1 August 2024, Bördner signed with Alemannia Aachen in 3. Liga.
