= Almamy Touré =

Malian footballer (born 1996)

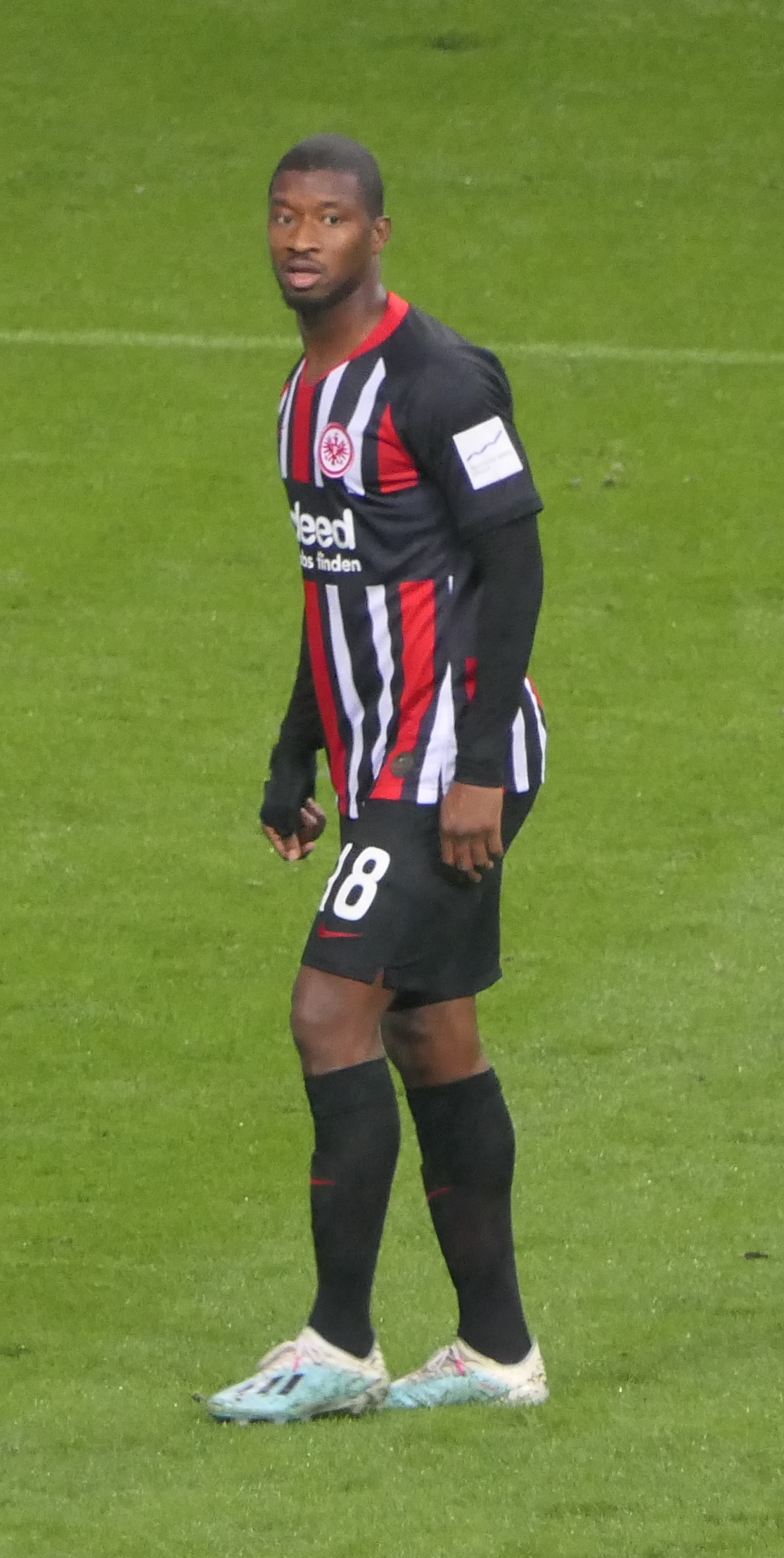
- Touré with Eintracht Frankfurt in 2019

Personal information
- Date of birth: 28 April 1996 (age 30)
- Place of birth: Bamako, Mali
- Height: 1.83 m (6 ft 0 in)
- Position: Right-back

Team information
- Current team: Bordeaux
- Number: 22

Youth career
- 2004: Espérance Sportive de Stains
- 2004–2010: Bourget FC
- 2010–2015: Monaco

Senior career*
Years	Team	Apps	(Gls)
2011–2016	Monaco B	45	(1)
2015–2019	Monaco	54	(5)
2019–2023	Eintracht Frankfurt	60	(2)
2023–2025	1. FC Kaiserslautern	19	(1)
2026–	Bordeaux	0	(0)

International career^{‡}
2019	France U21	2	(0)
2023	Mali	1	(0)
- * Club domestic league appearances and goals as of 23 May 2025 ‡ National team caps and goals as of 18 June 2023

Almamy Touré (born 28 April 1996) is a Malian professional footballer who plays for Régional 1 club Bordeaux as a centre-back and for the Mali national team.

== Club career ==
=== Monaco ===
Touré is a youth exponent from AS Monaco. He made his league debut on 20 February 2015 in a 1–0 away win against OGC Nice replacing Layvin Kurzawa after 35 minutes. Bernardo Silva scored the only goal of the game. He started his first game on 25 February 2015, during Monaco's surprise 3–1 victory against Arsenal at the Emirates Stadium. Touré signed a new four-year contract with Monaco on 19 May 2015.

=== Eintracht Frankfurt ===
On 31 January 2019, Touré joined Eintracht Frankfurt on a four-and-a-half-year deal. Toure struggled with injuries during the 2022–23 season, making just five starts. At the end of the 2023 season, Toure departed Eintracht Frankfurt and became a free agent.

=== 1. FC Kaiserslautern ===
On 15 November 2023, Touré joined 1. FC Kaiserslautern on a contract until the end of the season.

== International career ==
Though Touré did not possess French nationality until 2018, when he obtained it and appeared for the France under-21 national team. Touré switched his international allegiance back to Mali in 2022, when he was called up for their 2022 FIFA World Cup qualifying matches against Tunisia.

== Career statistics ==
=== Club ===
As of match played 14 December 2024

Appearances and goals by club, season and competition
Club	Season	League			National cup		League cup		Continental		Other		Total	
Club	Season	Division	Apps	Goals	Apps	Goals	Apps	Goals	Apps	Goals	Apps	Goals	Apps	Goals
Monaco	2014–15	Ligue 1	5	1	2	1	0	0	1 (Note: Appearance(s) in UEFA Champions League)	0	—		8	2
Monaco	2015–16	Ligue 1	10	3	1	0	0	0	2 (Note: Appearance(s) in UEFA Europa League)	0	—		13	3
Monaco	2016–17	Ligue 1	15	0	3	0	4	0	5	0	—		27	0
Monaco	2017–18	Ligue 1	20	1	2	0	1	0	3	0	1 (Note: Appearance in Trophée des Champions)	0	27	1
Monaco	2018–19	Ligue 1	4	0	0	0	0	0	1	0	0	0	5	0
Monaco	Total		54	5	8	1	5	0	12	0	1	0	80	6
Eintracht Frankfurt	2018–19	Bundesliga	7	0	0	0	—		0	0	0	0	7	0
Eintracht Frankfurt	2019–20	Bundesliga	19	1	3	0	—		7	0	—		29	1
Eintracht Frankfurt	2020–21	Bundesliga	17	1	1	0	—		—		—		18	1
Eintracht Frankfurt	2021–22	Bundesliga	10	0	0	0	—		8	1	—		18	1
Eintracht Frankfurt	2022–23	Bundesliga	7	0	1	0	—		—		1 (Note: Appearance in UEFA Super Cup)	0	9	0
Eintracht Frankfurt	Total		60	2	5	0	—		15	1	1	0	81	3
Kaiserlautern	2023–24	2. Bundesliga	11	1	4	1	—		—		—		15	2
Kaiserlautern	2024–25	2. Bundesliga	7	0	1	0	—		—		—		8	0
Kaiserlautern	Total		18	1	5	1	—		—		—		23	2
Career total			132	8	18	2	5	0	27	1	2	0	184	11

== Honours ==
Monaco

- Ligue 1: 2016–17

Eintracht Frankfurt

- UEFA Europa League: 2021–22
