= Seydou Sy =

Senegalese footballer

Personal information
- Full name: Seydou Sy
- Date of birth: 12 December 1995 (age 30)
- Place of birth: Dakar, Senegal
- Height: 1.92 m (6 ft 4 in)
- Position: Goalkeeper

Team information
- Current team: Mondercange
- Number: 30

Youth career
- –2016: Monaco

Senior career*
Years	Team	Apps	(Gls)
2014–2020	Monaco B	37	(0)
2016–2020	Monaco	7	(0)
2021	Nacional	0	(0)
2024–	Mondercange	4	(0)
Medal record
Men's football
Representing Senegal
African U-20 Championship
Silver medal – second place	2015 Senegal
- * Club domestic league appearances and goals as of 1 June 2024

Seydou Sy (French pronunciation: [sɛdu si]; born 12 December 1995) is a Senegalese association footballer who plays as a goalkeeper for BGL Ligue club Mondercange.

== Club career ==
=== Monaco ===
Sy is a youth exponent from AS Monaco. He made his first team debut on 20 May 2017 in the final Ligue 1 match of Monaco's championship season against Rennes, a 3–2 away win; he started the match and kept a clean sheet before being replaced by fellow debutant Loïc Badiashile at halftime. He and fellow goalkeepers Danijel Subašić and Diego Benaglio were all released in June 2020.

=== Nacional ===
On 11 February 2021, Sy signed a short-term contract with Portuguese Primeira Liga strugglers Nacional. On 24 May, after not appearing officially for the club, it was announced that his contract had been terminated, following the Madeira side's relegation to the second tier.

=== Mondercange ===
On 5 March 2024, FC Mondercange announced the signing of Sy.

== Career statistics ==
As of match played 1 June 2024

Appearances and goals by club, season and competition
Club	Season	League			Cup		League Cup		Europe		Other		Total	
Club	Season	Division	Apps	Goals	Apps	Goals	Apps	Goals	Apps	Goals	Apps	Goals	Apps	Goals
Monaco B	2014–15	CFA	13	0	—		—		—		—		13	0
Monaco B	2015–16	CFA	11	0	—		—		—		—		11	0
Monaco B	2016–17	CFA	9	0	—		—		—		—		9	0
Monaco B	2018–19	Championnat National 2	4	0	—		—		—		—		4	0
Monaco B	2019–20	Championnat National 2	1	0	—		—		—		—		1	0
Monaco B	Total		38	0	—		—		—		—		38	0
Monaco	2014–15	Ligue 1	0	0	0	0	0	0	0	0	—		0	0
Monaco	2015–16	Ligue 1	0	0	0	0	0	0	0	0	—		0	0
Monaco	2016–17	Ligue 1	1	0	0	0	0	0	0	0	—		1	0
Monaco	2017–18	Ligue 1	3	0	1	0	0	0	0	0	0	0	4	0
Monaco	2018–19	Ligue 1	3	0	0	0	0	0	0	0	0	0	3	0
Monaco	2019–20	Ligue 1	0	0	0	0	0	0	0	0	—		0	0
Monaco	Total		7	0	1	0	0	0	0	0	0	0	8	0
Nacional	2020–21	Primeira Liga	0	0	—		—		—		—		0	0
Mondercange	2023–24	Luxembourg National Division	4	0	0	0	—		—		—		4	0
Career total			11	0	1	0	0	0	0	0	0	0	12	0

== Honors ==
Monaco

- Ligue 1: 2016–17

Senegal

- Jeux de la Francophonie bronze medalist: 2013
