= Jorge (footballer, born 1996) =

Brazilian footballer

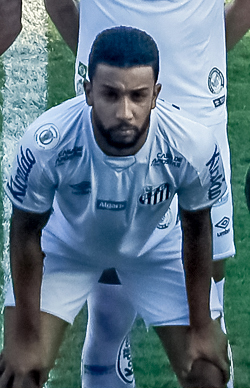
- Jorge with Santos in 2019

Personal information
- Full name: Jorge Marco de Oliveira Moraes
- Date of birth: 28 March 1996 (age 30)
- Place of birth: Rio de Janeiro, Brazil
- Height: 1.84 m (6 ft 1/2 in)
- Position: Left-back

Team information
- Current team: Remo
- Number: 6

Youth career
- 2003–2008: Vasco da Gama
- 2008–2015: Flamengo

Senior career*
Years	Team	Apps	(Gls)
2014–2017	Flamengo	69	(3)
2017	Monaco II	1	(0)
2017–2021	Monaco	24	(2)
2018–2019	→ Porto (loan)	0	(0)
2018–2019	→ Porto B (loan)	2	(0)
2019–2020	→ Santos (loan)	29	(1)
2020–2021	→ Basel (loan)	5	(0)
2021–2024	Palmeiras	24	(0)
2023	→ Fluminense (loan)	4	(0)
2024	→ Santos (loan)	0	(0)
2024	CRB	9	(0)
2025–	Remo	9	(0)

International career^{‡}
2015–2016	Brazil U20	10	(1)
2015	Brazil U23	2	(0)
2017	Brazil	1	(0)
- * Club domestic league appearances and goals as of 15 December 2025 ‡ National team caps and goals as of 25 January 2017

Jorge Marco de Oliveira Moraes (born 28 March 1996), simply known as Jorge (Brazilian Portuguese: [ˈʒɔʁʒi]), is a Brazilian professional footballer who plays as a left-back for Remo.

He is a former member of the Brazil U20 team.

== Club career ==
=== Flamengo ===
Born in Rio de Janeiro, Jorge joined Flamengo's youth setup in 2008, aged 11. He made his debut a senior on 16 March 2014, starting in a 2–2 Campeonato Carioca home draw against Bangu.

On 26 September 2014, Jorge signed a new deal with Fla, until December 2017. He was promoted to the main squad in 2015, by manager Vanderlei Luxemburgo.

Jorge made his Série A debut on 1 July 2015, starting in a 1–0 away win against Joinville. He subsequently overtook new signing Pablo Armero as first-choice, and renewed his contract for a further two years on 6 September.

Jorge scored his first top tier goal on 29 May 2016, netting the winner in a 2–1 success over Ponte Preta at the Estádio Moisés Lucarelli. His second goal in the category came on 16 July, in a 3-3 derby against Botafogo.

In September 2016, Brazilian press reported a possible Manchester City interest in signing Jorge. The English club would have begun to watch the left back after having excelled in the 2015 FIFA U-20 World Cup, being elected the best left-back of the competition.

=== Monaco ===
On 26 January 2017, AS Monaco FC signed Jorge from Flamengo, after agreeing to a €8.5 million transfer fee for the player. This was the biggest transfer in Flamengo's history at that time. After appearing rarely in his first six months, he became a regular starter during the 2017–18 campaign, replacing departed Benjamin Mendy.

==== Porto (loan) ====
On 31 August 2018, it was announced that Jorge would be loaned to Portuguese club FC Porto on a season-long deal with an option to buy. A backup to compatriot Alex Telles, he featured rarely.

==== Santos (loan) ====
On 27 March 2019, Jorge returned to Brazil signing with Santos on loan until the end of the year. He made his debut for the club on 4 April, starting in a 1–0 away loss against Atlético Goianiense, for the year's Copa do Brasil.

Jorge scored his first goal for Peixe on 24 April 2019, in a 2–1 away loss against Vasco da Gama also for the national cup. He was a regular starter for the club during the year, but returned to Monaco in December.

==== Basel (loan) ====
On 2 October 2020, FC Basel announced that they had signed in Jorge and that he had signed on a loan contract until the end of the season. After playing in a friendly match, he made his domestic league debut for his new club in the away game in the Kybunpark on 1 November 2020, as Basel won 2–1 against St. Gallen.

During the home match in the St. Jakob-Park on 16 December 2020 against Young Boys, Jorge suffered an injury and had to be substituted out in the 62nd minute. The injury turned out to be difficult and required an operation and this put him out for the rest of the season.

On 22 May 2021, the club announced that Jorge's loan contract that would expire 30 June would not be renewed and that he would return to Monaco. In his one season with the club, he played a total of seven games for Basel without scoring a goal, with five of these games being in the Swiss Super League and two being friendly games.

=== Palmeiras ===
On 23 July 2021, Palmeiras announced the signing of Jorge on a four-and-a-half-year contract, after the club acquired 50% of his economic rights. He made his debut for the club on 25 September, coming on as a late substitute for Renan in a 2–1 away loss to rivals Corinthians.

An immediate backup to Joaquín Piquerez, Jorge saw his already limited playing time decrease during the 2022 season, after the proeminence of Vanderlan, and was demoted to third-choice.

==== Fluminense (loan) ====
On 22 December 2022, Jorge joined Fluminense on a one-year loan deal, with a buyout clause. After starting the season as a first-choice, he lost his spot after Alexsander returned from international duty, and suffered a knee injury on training in February.

Jorge returned to trainings in November 2023, but failed to feature in a single league match for the club after the arrivals of Marcelo and Diogo Barbosa.

==== Return to Santos (loan) ====
On 27 December 2023, Santos announced the return of Jorge on a one-year loan deal. On 7 March of the following year, however, his loan was terminated and he left without making an appearance for the club, and he also rescinded his contract with Palmeiras hours later.

== International career ==
On 19 January 2017, Jorge was called up to the Brazil national team for the first time to play a friendly match against Colombia.

== Career statistics ==
=== Club ===
As of 26 December 2023

Appearances and goals by club, season and competition
Club	Season	League			State league		Cup		Continental		Other		Total	
Club	Season	Division	Apps	Goals	Apps	Goals	Apps	Goals	Apps	Goals	Apps	Goals	Apps	Goals
Flamengo	2014	Série A	0	0	1	0	0	0	—		—		1	0
Flamengo	2015	Série A	22	0	1	0	3	1	—		—		26	1
Flamengo	2016	Série A	32	2	17	1	4	0	2 (Note: Appearance(s) in Copa Sudamericana)	1	—		55	4
Flamengo	Total		54	2	19	1	7	1	2	1	—		82	5
Monaco II	2016–17	CFA	1	0	—		—		—		—		1	0
Monaco	2016–17	Ligue 1	2	1	—		3	0	0	0	0	0	5	1
Monaco	2017–18	Ligue 1	22	1	—		1	0	4 (Note: Appearance(s) in UEFA Champions League)	0	0	0	27	1
Monaco	2019–20	Ligue 1	0	0	—		2	0	—		—		2	0
Monaco	2020–21	Ligue 1	—		—		0	0	—		—		0	0
Monaco	Total		24	2	—		6	0	4	0	0	0	34	2
Porto (loan)	2018–19	Primeira Liga	0	0	—		1	0	1	0	1 (Note: Appearance(s) in Taça da Liga)	0	3	0
Porto B (loan)	2018–19	LigaPro	2	0	—		—		—		—		2	0
Santos (loan)	2019	Série A	29	1	—		6	1	—		—		35	2
Basel (loan)	2020–21	Swiss Super League	5	0	—		0	0	0	0	—		5	0
Palmeiras	2021	Série A	7	0	—		—		0	0	0	0	7	0
Palmeiras	2022	Série A	9	0	8	0	2	0	5 (Note: Appearance(s) in Copa Libertadores)	0	0	0	24	0
Palmeiras	Total		16	0	8	0	2	0	5	0	0	0	31	0
Fluminense (loan)	2023	Série A	0	0	4	0	0	0	0	0	—		4	0
Santos (loan)	2024	Série B	0	0	—		—		—		—		0	0
Career total			122	5	19	1	20	2	7	1	1	0	169	9

=== International ===
As of 25 January 2017

Appearances and goals by national team and year
National team	Year	Apps	Goals
Brazil	2017	1	0
Total		1	0

== Honours ==
=== Club ===
Flamengo

- Campeonato Carioca: 2014

Monaco

- Ligue 1: 2016–17

Palmeiras

- Copa Libertadores: 2021
- Recopa Sudamericana: 2022
- Campeonato Paulista: 2022
- Campeonato Brasileiro Série A: 2022
- FIFA Club World Cup Runner Up: 2021

Fluminense

- Campeonato Carioca: 2023
- Copa Libertadores: 2023

Remo

- Super Copa Grão-Pará: 2026

=== National ===
Brazil U20

- FIFA U-20 World Cup runner-up :2015

=== Individual ===
- FIFA U-20 World Cup Team of the Tournament: 2015
- Troféu Mesa Redonda Left-back of the Year in Brazil: 2016
- Campeonato Brasileiro Série A Team of the Year: 2016
- Bola de Prata: 2019
