= Kamil Glik =

Polish footballer (born 1988)

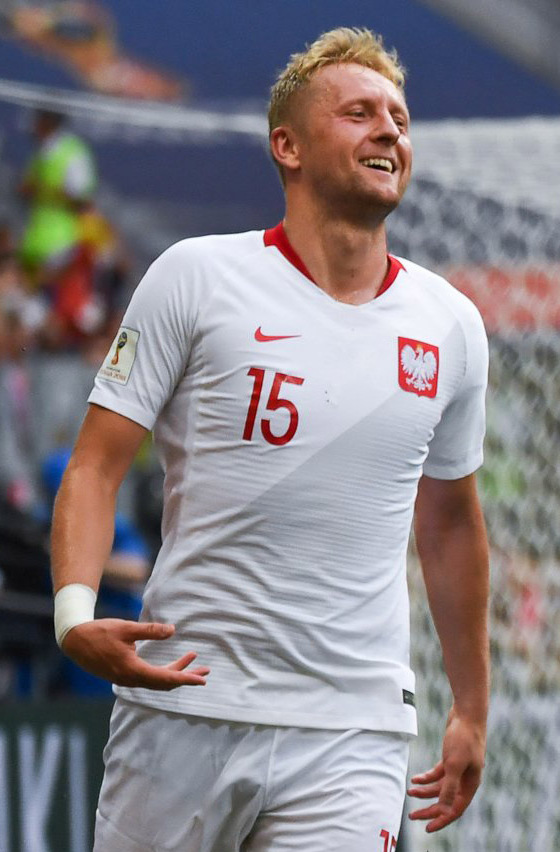
- Glik with Poland at the 2018 FIFA World Cup

Personal information
- Full name: Kamil Jacek Glik
- Date of birth: 3 February 1988 (age 38)
- Place of birth: Jastrzębie-Zdrój, Poland
- Height: 1.90 m (6 ft 3 in)
- Position: Centre-back

Team information
- Current team: Cracovia
- Number: 15

Youth career
- MOSiR Jastrzębie Zdrój
- 2000–2005: WSP Wodzisław Śląski

Senior career*
Years	Team	Apps	(Gls)
2005	→ Silesia Lubomia (loan)		
2006	Horadada		
2007–2008	Real Madrid C	18	(0)
2008–2010	Piast Gliwice	54	(2)
2010–2011	Palermo	0	(0)
2011	→ Bari (loan)	16	(0)
2011–2016	Torino	154	(12)
2016–2020	Monaco	128	(11)
2020–2023	Benevento	77	(2)
2023–	Cracovia	24	(2)
2026–	Cracovia II	1	(0)

International career
2008–2010	Poland U21	14	(3)
2010–2022	Poland	103	(6)
- * Club domestic league appearances and goals as of 16:56, 29 May 2026 (UTC)

Kamil Jacek Glik (Polish pronunciation: [ˈkamʲil ˈɡlʲik]; born 3 February 1988) is a Polish professional footballer who plays as a centre-back for Ekstraklasa club Cracovia. He previously played for Piast Gliwice from 2008 to 2010, Palermo from 2010 to 2011, Torino from 2011 to 2016, and Monaco from 2017 to 2020 – the latter two of which he was appointed captain of the team. At international level, Glik represented Poland at UEFA Euro 2016, 2018 FIFA World Cup, Euro 2020, and the 2022 World Cup.

== Early life ==
Glik's paternal grandfather, Walter Glück, was Upper Silesian, he was forcibly conscripted into the Wehrmacht. After the war, he stayed in what then became Poland, so Glik holds both German and Polish citizenships. In his German documents, his surname is written in the German version Glück instead of the Polonised version Glik. Despite this, Glik has repeatedly said that he does not feel any connection with Germany and considers himself 100% Polish.

== Club career ==
=== Early career ===
Glik began his career in the youth ranks of MOSiR Jastrzębie Zdrój and WSP Wodzisław Śląski before moving to LKS Silesia Lubomia on loan. In 2006, he moved from WSP Wodzisław Śląski to Horadada in Spain, where he was noticed by Real Madrid and registered with the club's reserve team. On 6 August 2008, he signed a four-year contract with Polish top division side Piast Gliwice. On 30 August 2008, Glik made his league debut for Piast Gliwice in the match against Jagiellonia Białystok. At the end of the season, Glik reportedly begun talks with Italian club U.S. Città di Palermo. On 7 July 2010, he signed with said Sicilian club, who purchased him outright on a five-year contract.

A few days before the official reopening of the Serie A transfer window, Palermo granted an exemption and allowed him to train – with a recovery date set for 28 December 2011 – with his new club, Bari. He moved to Bari until the end of season, but was strongly backed by the coach Giampiero Ventura; the contract was filed on 4 January. After the resumption of the league on 6 January, Glik debuted as a starter in the Puglia derby between Lecce and Bari, which ended in a 0–1 loss for his club.

=== Torino ===
==== Arrival and Serie A debut ====
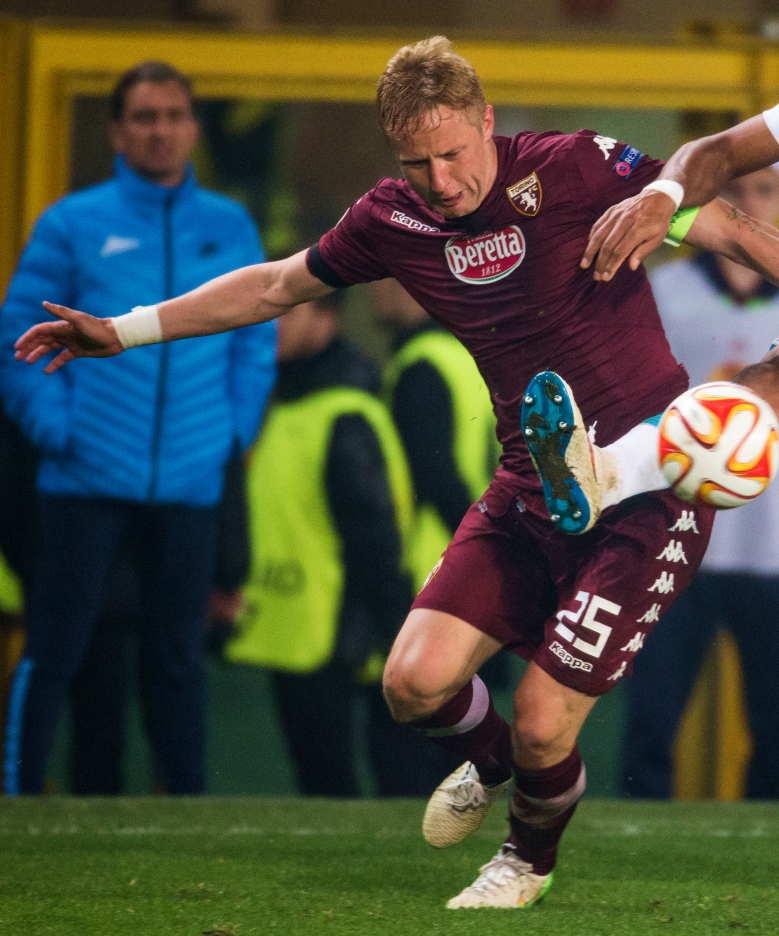
Glik as captain of Torino in 2015

On 12 July 2011, having supported Torino's training camp, Glik transferred to the club in a co-ownership deal in Serie B for €300,000. He made his debut on 13 August against Lumezzane in the second round of Coppa Italia, played as a starter, which ended in a 1–0 victory for Torino. Glik scored his first goal in the 34th round in the match between Torino and Reggina, only to be suspended due to bad weather; the end of match did not change the result

On 31 October 2012, Glik scored his first goal in a 1–1 away draw Serie A match against Lazio, opening the scoring with a header after a corner. He played his first derby in the 2012–13 season, collecting two appearances and as many expulsions – being the first player in the history of the league to be sent-off in both legs of a derby – and became an idol of the Torino fans. On 20 June, Torino acquired his remaining contract from Palermo for a fee of €1.5 million, resolving the co-ownership.

==== Becoming captain ====
For the 2013–14 season, Glik was named captain of Torino after the departure of Rolando Bianchi. On 9 December 2013, he scored the winning goal in a 1–0 victory against Lazio. Glik ended the season with 34 league appearances – which ended with Torino's qualification to the UEFA Europa League after Parma failed to obtain a UEFA license – and two goals, alongside an appearance in the Coppa Italia. On 25 May 2014, He renewed his contract until 2017.

On 31 July 2014, Glik made his debut with the Granata in an international competition, playing the first leg of the third qualifying round of the UEFA Europa League. Torino won 3–0 against the Swedish club Brommapojkarna. In an away match against Cagliari on 24 September, he scored in a 1–1 during his 100th match for Torino, resulting in an eventual 2–1 victory for his club. On 21 December, at the Stadio Olimpico in Turin, Glik scored his first brace in Serie A during a 2–1 comeback victory against Genoa.

On 10 January 2015, Glik scored the 1–1 equaliser against AC Milan, after which he scored the 1–0 against Napoli on 1 March. On 19 March 2015, he scored his first goal in the Europa League with a header during the round of 16 against Zenit Saint Petersburg. His goal brought Torino to 1–0, but was not enough to overcome the two-goal deficit from the first leg. On 5 April, Glik scored the second goal in a 2–0 lead against Atalanta, ending in a 2–1 victory for Torino. On 20 December 2015, he renewed with the Piedmontese club until 2020.

=== Monaco ===
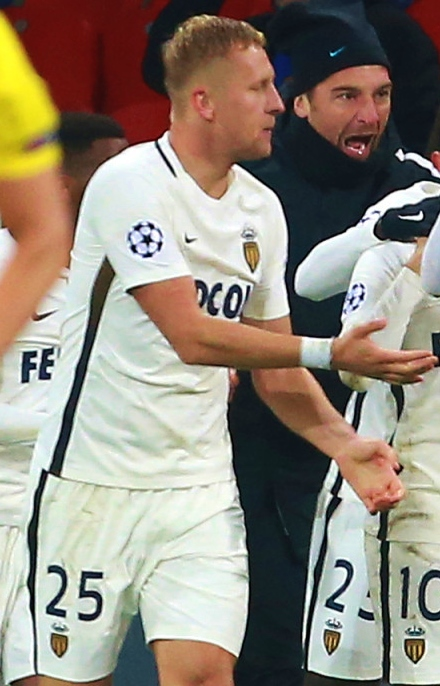
Glik as a player of Monaco in 2016

On 4 July 2016, Glik was sold to Monaco for a reported fee of €11 million with a bonus of €4 million, signing a four-year contract. In an official statement on Torino's website, the club stated: "It has been five wonderful years, full of intense emotions and mutual satisfaction. President Cairo and the whole Torino FC salute Glik with great affection, wishing him the best that his career can offer."

On 27 September 2016, Glik fired in a half-volley from the edge of the penalty box four minutes into second-half stoppage time to cancel out Javier Hernández's goal, leading Monaco to snatch a 1–1 home draw in their 2016–17 UEFA Champions League Group E against Bayer Leverkusen with their first and only shot on target of the match. Glik played a key part in AS Monaco's squad that won the 2016–17 Ligue 1, making 36 appearances and scoring 6 goals.

=== Later career ===
On 11 August 2020, Glik transferred to then-newly-promoted Serie A club Benevento on a three-year contract. On 30 August 2023, Glik signed a two-year contract with Ekstraklasa club Cracovia. he was also linked with other Polish clubs, Legia Warsaw and Śląsk Wrocław, neither of which reportedly decided to pursue his services. On 20 May 2025, despite missing most of the season due to a torn ACL, Glik extended his contract with Cracovia for another year.

== International career ==
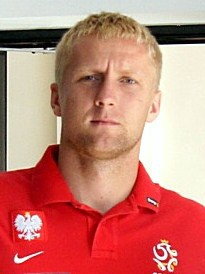
Glik with Poland in 2012

Glik was called up to the Polish senior team on 18 December 2009, being the first Piast Gliwice player to do so. He debuted on 20 January 2010 at the King's Cup against Thailand, scoring 43 minutes into his debut which resulted in a 3–1 victory for Poland. On 17 October 2012, Glik scored the equalizing goal in a 2014 FIFA World Cup qualification against England. He played an important role in Poland's Euro 2016 qualifying and final tournaments, making the most clearances out of any other players in the tournament and scored two penalties in two penalty shoot-outs; one of them in a 5–4 victory against Switzerland, and the other in a 5–3 defeat to eventual champions Portugal.

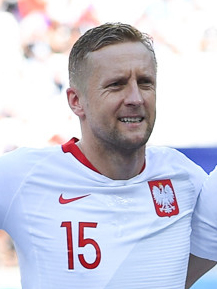
Glik with Poland at the 2018 World Cup

In June 2018, Glik became part of the Polish squad for the 2018 FIFA World Cup in Russia. In May 2021, he was included in the final squad for the postponed UEFA Euro 2020.

On 10 November 2022, Glik was called up for the 2022 FIFA World Cup in Qatar. On 22 November, he played his 100th match for Poland in their first 2022 World Cup one against Mexico.

== Style of play ==
Glik is a tall centre-back combining physicality and mobility; his biggest strength is his aerial ability, both in marking and on set pieces in the opposing area. He is also known for his leadership on the pitch.

== Personal life ==
Glik has two daughters with his wife, whom he had known since elementary school. In 2013, Italian rapper Willie Peyote, a Torino fan, released a song named "Glik" as a homage to him.

== Career statistics ==
=== Club ===
As of match played 11 May 2026

Appearances and goals by club, season and competition
Club	Season	League			National cup (Note: Includes Polish Cup, Coppa Italia, Coupe de France)		Europe		Other		Total	
Club	Season	Division	Apps	Goals	Apps	Goals	Apps	Goals	Apps	Goals	Apps	Goals
Piast Gliwice	2008–09	Ekstraklasa	26	0	1	0	—		—		27	0
Piast Gliwice	2009–10	Ekstraklasa	28	2	1	0	—		—		29	2
Piast Gliwice	Total		54	2	2	0	—		—		56	2
Palermo	2010–11	Serie A	0	0	0	0	4 (Note: Appearances in UEFA Europa League)	0	—		4	0
Bari (loan)	2010–11	Serie A	16	0	1	0	—		—		17	0
Torino	2011–12	Serie B	23	2	1	0	—		—		24	2
Torino	2012–13	Serie A	32	1	1	0	—		—		33	1
Torino	2013–14	Serie A	34	2	1	0	—		—		35	2
Torino	2014–15	Serie A	32	7	1	0	11	1	—		44	8
Torino	2015–16	Serie A	33	0	2	0	—		—		35	0
Torino	Total		154	12	6	0	11	1	—		171	13
Monaco	2016–17	Ligue 1	36	6	4	1	13 (Note: Appearances in UEFA Champions League)	1	—		53	8
Monaco	2017–18	Ligue 1	36	3	5	0	6	1	1 (Note: Appearance in Trophée des Champions)	0	48	4
Monaco	2018–19	Ligue 1	33	1	3	0	5	0	1	0	42	1
Monaco	2019–20	Ligue 1	23	1	1	0	—		—		24	1
Monaco	Total		128	11	13	1	24	2	2	0	167	14
Benevento	2020–21	Serie A	36	2	1	0	—		—		37	2
Benevento	2021–22	Serie B	23	0	2	0	—		3 (Note: Appearances in Serie B promotion play-offs)	0	28	0
Benevento	2022–23	Serie B	18	0	1	1	—		—		19	1
Benevento	Total		77	2	4	1	—		3	0	84	3
Cracovia	2023–24	Ekstraklasa	13	2	1	0	—		—		14	2
Cracovia	2024–25	Ekstraklasa	9	0	0	0	—		—		9	0
Cracovia	2025–26	Ekstraklasa	2	0	0	0	—		—		2	0
Cracovia	Total		24	2	1	0	—		—		25	2
Cracovia II	2025–26	III liga, gr. IV	1	0	—		—		—		1	0
Career total			454	29	27	2	39	3	5	0	525	34

=== International ===
Appearances and goals by national team and year
National team	Year	Apps	Goals
Poland	2010	7	1
Poland	2011	4	0
Poland	2012	4	1
Poland	2013	7	0
Poland	2014	7	1
Poland	2015	8	0
Poland	2016	13	0
Poland	2017	6	1
Poland	2018	8	0
Poland	2019	9	1
Poland	2020	6	1
Poland	2021	11	0
Poland	2022	13	0
Total		103	6

Scores and results list Poland's goal tally first, score column indicates score after each Glik goal.

List of international goals scored by Kamil Glik
No.	Date	Venue	Opponent	Score	Result	Competition
1	20 January 2010	80th Birthday Stadium, Nakhon Ratchasima, Thailand	Thailand	1–0	3–1	2010 King's Cup
2	17 October 2012	Stadion Narodowy, Warsaw, Poland	England	1–1	1–1	2014 FIFA World Cup qualification
3	14 November 2014	Boris Paichadze Dinamo Arena, Tbilisi, Georgia	Georgia	1–0	4–0	UEFA Euro 2016 qualification
4	4 September 2017	Stadion Narodowy, Warsaw, Poland	Kazakhstan	2–0	3–0	2018 FIFA World Cup qualification
5	24 March 2019	Stadion Narodowy, Warsaw, Poland	Latvia	2–0	2–0	UEFA Euro 2020 qualification
6	7 September 2020	Bilino Polje, Zenica, Bosnia and Herzegovina	Bosnia and Herzegovina	1–1	2–1	2020–21 UEFA Nations League A

== Honours ==
Monaco

- Ligue 1: 2016–17

Individual

- UNFP Ligue 1 Team of the Year: 2016–17
