= 2017–18 Coupe de la Ligue =

French League Cup

Tournament details
- Country: France
- Teams: 44

Final positions
- Champions: Paris Saint-Germain (8th title)
- Runners-up: Monaco

Tournament statistics
- Matches played: 41
- Goals scored: 88 (2.15 per match)
- Top goal scorer(s): Souleymane Camara; Radamel Falcao; Adrien Hunou (3 goals each)

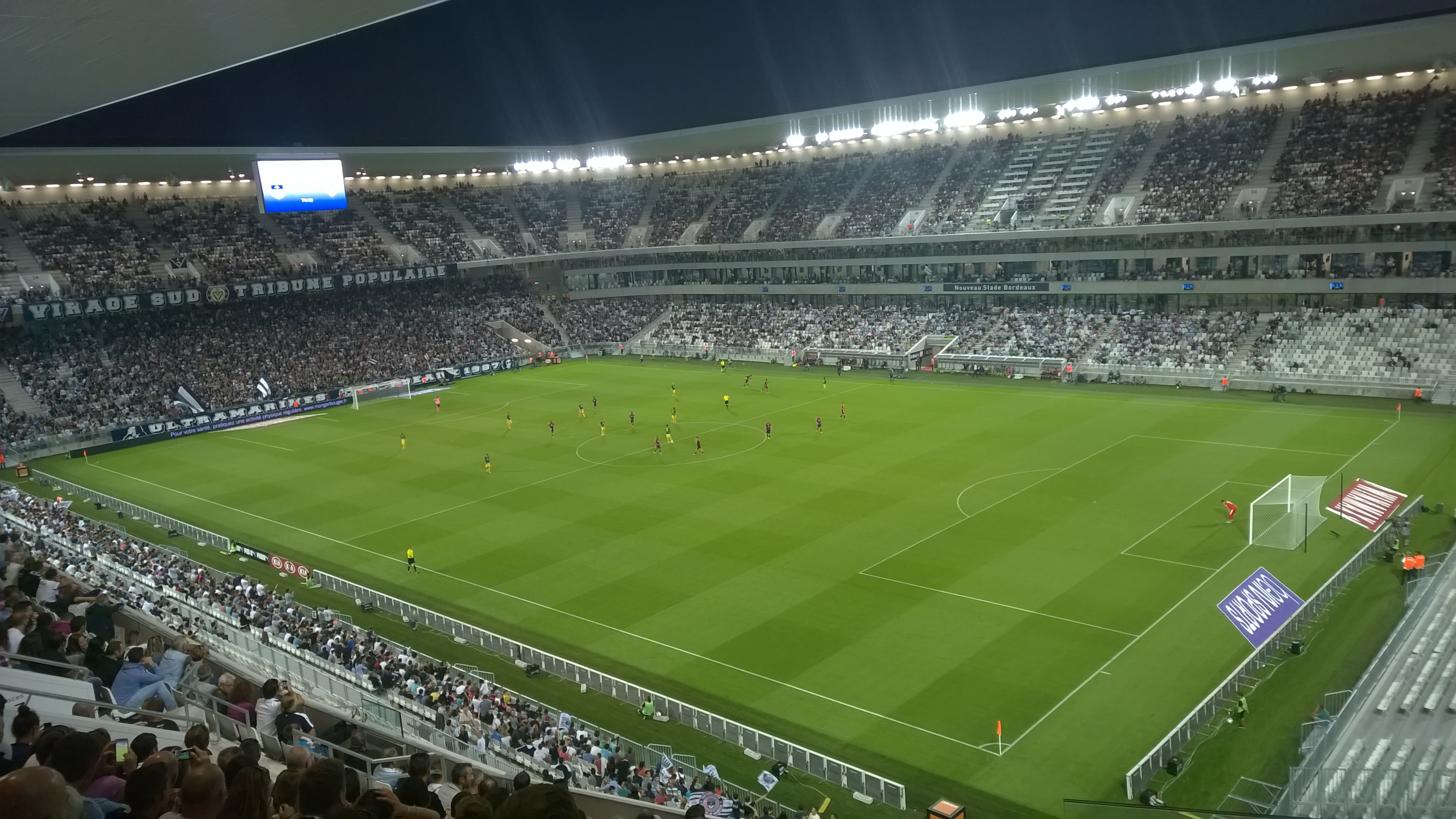

The 2017–18 Coupe de la Ligue was the 24th edition of the French league cup competition. The winners of the league cup earned a place in the 2018–19 Europa League starting in the second qualifying round. Forty-four clubs participated in the competition.

Paris Saint-Germain were the four-time defending champions after winning the cup in the previous four seasons, and they won a fifth consecutive title and eighth title overall by defeating Monaco 3–0 in the final.

== First round ==
Eleven first round matches were played on 8 August 2017. The twelfth scheduled match was awarded to Nancy as a walkover after Bastia had their professional status removed by the FFF, and thereby did not qualify to participate according to the rules of the competition.

8 August 2017	Laval (3)	1–1 (3–4 p)	Lorient (2)	Laval
18:30 CEST	Elton 83'	Report	Courtet 38'	Stadium: Stade Francis Le Basser; Attendance: 3,481; Referee: Mehdi Mokhtari
	Penalties
	Etinof (penalty scored); Elton (penalty missed); Pereira (penalty scored); Sarr (penalty scored); Solet (penalty missed); Zeoula (penalty missed)		(penalty scored) Courtet; (penalty scored) Selemani; (penalty missed) Danic; (penalty scored) Guendouzi; (penalty missed) Bouanga; (penalty scored) Le Goff

8 August 2017	Le Havre (2)	4–4 (5–4 p)	Nîmes (2)	Le Havre
20:00 CEST	Ferhat 67'; Julan 72', 76'; Louiserre 77'	Report	Bozok 25'; Thioub 43'; Savanier 89'; Briançon 90+3'	Stadium: Stade Océane; Attendance: 4,849; Referee: Aurélien Petit
	Penalties
	Youga (penalty scored); Bain (penalty scored); Ferhat (penalty scored); Julan (penalty scored)		(penalty scored) Savanier; (penalty scored) Alioui; (penalty scored) Depres; (penalty missed) Ripart; (penalty scored) Thioub

8 August 2017	Paris FC (2)	0–0 (4–3 p)	Brest (2)	Paris
20:00 CEST		Report		Stadium: Stade Charléty; Attendance: 1,325; Referee: Sylvain Palhies
	Penalties
	Akichi (penalty scored); Nomenjanahary (penalty missed); Alami (penalty scored); Robail (penalty scored); Karamoko (penalty missed); Yohou (penalty scored)		(penalty scored) Berthomier; (penalty missed) Labidi; (penalty scored) Pi; (penalty scored) Butin; (penalty missed) Grougi; (penalty missed) Coeff

8 August 2017	Quevilly-Rouen (2)	0–1	Orléans (2)	Le Mans
20:00 CEST		Report	Perrin 41'	Stadium: MMArena; Attendance: 825; Referee: Jérémy Stinat

8 August 2017	Red Star (3)	1–1 (6–5 p)	Auxerre (2)	Saint-Ouen
20:00 CEST	Teuma 6'	Report	Ayé 50'	Stadium: Stade Bauer; Attendance: 2,039; Referee: Willy Delajod
	Penalties
	Petrilli (penalty missed); Sylvestre (penalty scored); Fomen (penalty scored); Keita (penalty scored); Fontaine (penalty scored); Sané (penalty scored); Teuma (penalty scored)		(penalty scored) Ayé; (penalty scored) Philippoteaux; (penalty scored) Tacalfred; (penalty scored) Montiel; (penalty missed) Diallo; (penalty scored) Youssouf; (penalty missed) Sangaré

8 August 2017	Gazélec Ajaccio (2)	0–0 (6–5 p)	Créteil (3)	Ajaccio
20:00 CEST		Report		Stadium: Stade Ange Casanova; Attendance: 2,531; Referee: Florent Batta
	Penalties
	M'Changama (penalty missed); Clerc (penalty scored); Kemen (penalty missed); Court (penalty scored); Diabaté (penalty scored); Ribéry (penalty scored); Campanini (penalty scored); Mombris (penalty scored)		(penalty scored) Dias; (penalty scored) Buaillon; (penalty scored) Puygrenier; (penalty missed) Gendrey; (penalty missed) Petshi; (penalty scored) Gassama; (penalty scored) Fofana; (penalty missed) Soares

8 August 2017	Châteauroux (2)	0–1	Clermont (2)	Châteauroux
20:00 CEST		Report	Gavory 90+3'	Stadium: Stade Gaston Petit; Attendance: 2,782; Referee: Olivier Thual

8 August 2017	Tours (2)	4–1	Niort (2)	Tours
20:00 CEST	Bouazza 29'; Tall 34'; Raveloson 50'; Bayard 53'	Report	Grange 63'	Stadium: Stade de la Vallée du Cher; Attendance: 4,013; Referee: Pierre Gaillouste

8 August 2017	Bourg-Péronnas (2)	0–1	Reims (2)	Bourg-en-Bresse
20:00 CEST		Report	Berthier 15'	Stadium: Stade Marcel-Verchère; Attendance: 1,425; Referee: William Lavis

8 August 2017	Valenciennes (2)	3–1	Sochaux (2)	Valenciennes
20:00 CEST	Ambri 10', 69'; Romil 13'	Report	Daham 81'	Stadium: Stade du Hainaut; Attendance: 4,456; Referee: Stéphane Jochem

8 August 2017	Lens (2)	2–1	Ajaccio (2)	Lens
21:00 CEST	Lendrić 75'; López 78'	Report	Coutadeur 37'	Stadium: Stade Bollaert-Delelis; Attendance: 12,070; Referee: Jérôme Brisard

Nancy (2)	w/o	Bastia (5)

== Second round ==
Six second round matches were played between the first round winners on 22 August 2017.

22 August 2017	Lorient (2)	3–2	Lens (2)	Lorient
18:30 CEST	Bouanga 22'; Moreira 23'; Cabot 29'	Report	Koukou 37'; López 45+2'	Stadium: Stade du Moustoir; Attendance: 7,790; Referee: Thomas Léonard

22 August 2017	Nancy (2)	2–2 (4–2 p)	Orléans (2)	Tomblaine
20:00 CEST	N'Guessan 6'; Nordin 45+1'	Report	Nabab 9'; Ziani 86' (pen.)	Stadium: Stade Marcel Picot; Attendance: 8,965; Referee: François Letexier
	Penalties
	Nordin (penalty scored); Cuffaut (penalty scored); Chrétien (penalty scored); Abergel (penalty scored)		(penalty scored) Ziani; (penalty scored) Chemin; (penalty missed) Perrin; (penalty missed) Gomis

22 August 2017	Paris FC (2)	0–2	Clermont (2)	Paris
20:00 CEST		Report	Dugimont 18'; N'Diaye 90+4'	Stadium: Stade Charléty; Attendance: 1,165; Referee: Mikael Lesage

22 August 2017	Tours (2)	0–0 (7–6 p)	Le Havre (2)	Tours
20:00 CEST		Report		Stadium: Stade de la Vallée du Cher; Attendance: 3,421; Referee: Jérémy Stinat
	Penalties
	Cissé (penalty scored); Bergougnoux (penalty scored); De Almeida (penalty scored); Belkebla (penalty scored); Makhedjouf (penalty scored); Raveloson (penalty scored); Miguel (penalty scored)		(penalty scored) Ayasse; (penalty scored) Moukoudi; (penalty scored) Traoré; (penalty scored) Ferhat; (penalty scored) Julan; (penalty scored) Louiserre; (penalty missed) Fontaine

22 August 2017	Gazélec Ajaccio (2)	0–0 (3–4 p)	Red Star (3)	Ajaccio
20:00 CEST		Report		Stadium: Stade Ange Casanova; Attendance: 3,073; Referee: Hakim Ben El Hadj
	Penalties
	Perquis (penalty missed); Ribéry (penalty scored); Marveaux (penalty scored); Court (penalty scored); Kemen (penalty missed)		(penalty scored) Sylvestre; (penalty scored) Sané; (penalty missed) Lefebvre; (penalty scored) Sy; (penalty scored) T. Keita

22 August 2017	Valenciennes (2)	3–0	Reims (2)	Valenciennes
21:00 CEST	Guezoui 36'; Ndom 41' (o.g.); Mauricio 52'	Report		Stadium: Stade du Hainaut; Attendance: 4,113; Referee: Sylvain Palhies

== Third round ==
The draw for the third round matches was held on 20 September 2017. Two matches were played on 24 October 2017 and eight matches were played on 25 October 2017.

24 October 2017	Lorient (2)	0–1	Caen (1)	Lorient
18:45 CEST		Report	Kouakou 43'	Stadium: Stade du Moustoir; Attendance: 8,862; Referee: Karim Abed

24 October 2017	Guingamp (1)	0–2	Montpellier (1)	Guingamp
21:05 CEST		Report	Camara 20'; Ninga 71'	Stadium: Stade du Roudourou; Attendance: 13,318; Referee: Benoît Millot

25 October 2017	Lille (1)	2–2 (5–4 p)	Valenciennes (2)	Villeneuve-d'Ascq
18:45 CEST	Benzia 14'; Alonso 74'	Report	Pierre-Charles 44'; Mothiba 90+1' (pen.)	Stadium: Stade Pierre-Mauroy; Attendance: 30,643; Referee: Frank Schneider
	Penalties
	Ié (penalty missed); Alonso (penalty scored); Bahlouli (penalty scored); El Ghazi (penalty scored); Soumaré (penalty missed); Maia (penalty scored); Mendes (penalty scored)		(penalty scored) Néry; (penalty missed) Diarra; (penalty scored) Mauricio; (penalty missed) Ramaré; (penalty scored) Guezoui; (penalty scored) Mothiba; (penalty missed) Pierre-Charles

25 October 2017	Angers (1)	3–2	Nancy (2)	Angers
21:05 CEST	Ciss 12'; Guillaume 17'; Pavlović 90+3'	Report	Eler 58'; Dembélé 59'	Stadium: Stade Raymond Kopa; Attendance: 9,802; Referee: Jérôme Miguelgorry

25 October 2017	Dijon (1)	1–2	Rennes (1)	Dijon
21:05 CEST	Sammaritano 15'	Report	Khazri 43'; Hunou 87'	Stadium: Stade Gaston Gérard; Attendance: 10,507; Referee: Jérôme Brisard

25 October 2017	Metz (1)	1–0	Red Star (3)	Metz
21:05 CEST	Dossevi 65'	Report		Stadium: Stade Saint-Symphorien; Attendance: 5,612; Referee: Hakim Ben El Hadj

25 October 2017	Toulouse (1)	4–2	Clermont (2)	Toulouse
21:05 CEST	Moubandje 21'; Sanogo 25'; Gradel 39'; Toivonen 58'	Report	Dugimont 29'; Doré 31'	Stadium: Stadium Municipal; Attendance: 10,222; Referee: Sébastien Desiage

25 October 2017	Tours (2)	3–1	Nantes (1)	Tours
21:05 CEST	Miguel 4'; Mancini 6'; Bouazza 19'	Report	Lima 35' (pen.)	Stadium: Stade de la Vallée du Cher; Attendance: 9,477; Referee: Thomas Léonard

25 October 2017	Troyes (1)	1–2	Amiens (1)	Troyes
21:05 CEST	Bellugou 49'	Report	Konaté 40'; Ielsch 79'	Stadium: Stade de l'Aube; Attendance: 4,693; Referee: Olivier Thual

25 October 2017	Strasbourg (1)	1–1 (5–4 p)	Saint-Étienne (1)	Strasbourg
21:05 CEST	Bahoken 37'	Report	Hernani 84'	Stadium: Stade de la Meinau; Attendance: 18,317; Referee: Mikael Lesage
	Penalties
	Lala (penalty scored); Nogueira (penalty scored); Gonçalves (penalty scored); Sacko (penalty scored); Koné (penalty scored)		(penalty missed) Hamouma; (penalty scored) Hernani; (penalty scored) Søderlund; (penalty scored) Silva; (penalty scored) Bamba

Notes

1. Location of match reversed after original draw.

== Round of 16 ==
The draw for the Round of 16 matches was held on 8 November 2017.

12 December 2017	Toulouse (1)	2–0	Bordeaux (1)	Toulouse
18:45 (UTC+1)	Gradel 36' (pen.); Toivonen 53'	Report		Stadium: Stadium Municipal; Attendance: 8,851; Referee: Antony Gautier

12 December 2017	Monaco (1)	2–0	Caen (1)	Monaco
21:05 (UTC+1)	Carrillo 33'; Falcao 85'	Report		Stadium: Stade Louis II; Attendance: 4,834; Referee: Thomas Léonard

12 December 2017	Angers (1)	1–0	Metz (1)	Angers
21:05 (UTC+1)	Fulgini 52'	Report		Stadium: Stade Raymond Kopa; Attendance: 4,109; Referee: Olivier Thual

13 December 2017	Rennes (1)	2–2 (4–3 p)	Marseille (1)	Rennes
18:45 (UTC+1)	André 23'; Khazri 57'	Report	Mitroglou 13'; Germain 80'	Stadium: Roazhon Park; Attendance: 22,906; Referee: Johan Hamel
	Penalties
	Khazri (penalty scored); André (penalty scored); Gnagnon (penalty scored); Gelin (penalty missed); Bourigeaud (penalty scored)		(penalty scored) Germain; (penalty scored) Mitroglou; (penalty missed) Ocampos; (penalty missed) Sarr; (penalty scored) Sanson

13 December 2017	Strasbourg (1)	2–4	Paris Saint-Germain (1)	Strasbourg
21:05 (UTC+1)	Grimm 36'; Blayac 88'	Report	Salmier 13' (o.g.); Di María 25'; Dani Alves 62'; Draxler 78'	Stadium: Stade de la Meinau; Attendance: 25,349; Referee: Mikael Lesage

13 December 2017	Lille (1)	1–1 (2–3 p)	Nice (1)	Villeneuve-d'Ascq
21:05 (UTC+1)	Luiz Araújo 7'	Report	Balotelli 58'	Stadium: Stade Pierre-Mauroy; Attendance: 9,651; Referee: Stéphane Jochem
	Penalties
	Luiz Araújo (penalty missed); Alonso (penalty missed); Mendes (penalty scored); El Ghazi (penalty scored); Bissouma (penalty missed)		(penalty scored) Lees-Melou; (penalty missed) Cyprien; (penalty scored) Pléa; (penalty scored) Seri

13 December 2017	Amiens (1)	2–1	Tours (2)	Amiens
21:05 (UTC+1)	Koita 16'; Bourgaud 45+1'	Report	Mancini 90'	Stadium: Stade de la Licorne; Attendance: 5,645; Referee: Frank Schneider

13 December 2017	Montpellier (1)	4–1	Lyon (1)	Montpellier
21:05 (UTC+1)	Camara 17', 22'; Sambia 45+1'; Bérigaud 86' (pen.)	Report	Maolida 10'	Stadium: Stade de la Mosson; Attendance: 7,447; Referee: Jérôme Brisard

== Quarter-finals ==
The draw for the quarter-final matches was held on 13 December 2017.

9 January 2018	Nice (1)	1–2	Monaco (1)	Nice
21:00 (UTC+1)	Pléa 18'	Report	Lemar 3'; Diakhaby 37'	Stadium: Allianz Riviera; Attendance: 19,686; Referee: Clément Turpin

10 January 2018	Rennes (1)	4–2	Toulouse (1)	Rennes
18:45 (UTC+1)	Yago 21' (o.g.); Bourigeaud 42'; Hunou 86', 90+2'	Report	Sylla 40'; Sanogo 63'	Stadium: Roazhon Park; Attendance: 16,766; Referee: Benoît Millot

10 January 2018	Amiens (1)	0–2	Paris Saint-Germain (1)	Amiens
21:05 (UTC+1)		Report	Neymar 53' (pen.); Rabiot 78'	Stadium: Stade de la Licorne; Attendance: 9,222; Referee: Nicolas Rainville

10 January 2018	Angers (1)	0–1	Montpellier (1)	Angers
21:05 (UTC+1)		Report	Mbenza 86'	Stadium: Stade Raymond Kopa; Attendance: 4,705; Referee: Ruddy Buquet

== Semi-finals ==
The draw for the semi-final matches was held on 10 January 2018.

30 January 2018	Rennes (1)	2–3	Paris Saint-Germain (1)	Rennes
21:05 (UTC+1)	Sakho 85'; Prcić 90+2'	Report	Meunier 24'; Marquinhos 53'; Lo Celso 58'	Stadium: Roazhon Park; Attendance: 28,620; Referee: Mikael Lesage

31 January 2018	Monaco (1)	2–0	Montpellier (1)	Monaco
21:05 (UTC+1)	Falcao 15', 29'	Report		Stadium: Stade Louis II; Attendance: 6,024; Referee: Amaury Delerue

== Final ==
The final was held on 31 March 2018 at the Nouveau Stade de Bordeaux.

31 March 2018
21:05 CEST

Paris Saint-Germain	3–0	Monaco
Cavani 8' (pen.), 85'; Di María 21'	Report

Nouveau Stade de Bordeaux, Bordeaux
Attendance: 41,248
Referee: Clément Turpin

== See also ==
- 2017–18 Ligue 1
- 2017–18 Ligue 2
- 2017–18 Championnat National
