= 2017–18 Lille OSC season =

Lille
2017–18 season
- President: Gérard Lopez
- Head coach: Marcelo Bielsa (until 15 December); Christophe Galtier (from 23 December)
- Stadium: Stade Pierre-Mauroy
- Ligue 1: 17th
- Coupe de France: Round of 32
- Coupe de la Ligue: Round of 16
- Top goalscorer: League: Nicolas Pépé (13); All: Nicolas Pépé (14)
Home colours	Away colours	Third colours

The 2017–18 season was Lille OSC's 74th season in existence and the club's 18th consecutive season in the top flight of French football.

== Players ==
=== Squad information ===
As of 1 February 2018.

Note: Flags indicate national team as defined under FIFA eligibility rules; some limited exceptions apply. Players may hold more than one non-FIFA nationality.

No.	Pos.	Nation	Player
1	GK	SVK	Adam Jakubech
2	DF	FRA	Kévin Malcuit
3	DF	PAR	Júnior Alonso
5	DF	FRA	Adama Soumaoro
6	MF	FRA	Ibrahim Amadou (captain)
7	FW	NED	Anwar El Ghazi
9	FW	ARG	Ezequiel Ponce (on loan from Roma)
10	FW	ALG	Yassine Benzia
11	FW	BRA	Luiz Araujo
14	MF	FRA	Imad Faraj
15	DF	POR	Edgar Ié
16	GK	FRA	Mike Maignan
17	MF	FRA	Valère Pollet
18	FW	RSA	Lebo Mothiba

No.	Pos.	Nation	Player
19	FW	CIV	Nicolas Pépé
20	MF	BRA	Thiago Maia
21	MF	MLI	Yves Bissouma
22	DF	CIV	Kouadio-Yves Dabila
23	MF	BRA	Thiago Mendes
24	MF	FRA	Boubakary Soumaré
25	DF	FRA	Fodé Ballo-Touré
26	MF	FRA	Farès Bahlouli
27	DF	MAR	Hamza Mendyl
29	MF	MLI	Rominigue Kouamé
30	GK	BFA	Hervé Koffi
—	DF	FRA	Scotty Sadzoute
—	DF	FRA	Benjamin Vérité

=== Out of squad ===
Note: Flags indicate national team as defined under FIFA eligibility rules; some limited exceptions apply. Players may hold more than one non-FIFA nationality.

No.	Pos.	Nation	Player
—	GK	NGA	Vincent Enyeama

=== Out on loan ===
Note: Flags indicate national team as defined under FIFA eligibility rules; some limited exceptions apply. Players may hold more than one non-FIFA nationality.

No.	Pos.	Nation	Player
—	GK	FRA	Jean Butez (on loan to Royal Excel Mouscron)
—	DF	FRA	Valentin Vanbaleghem (on loan to Les Herbiers)
—	DF	ZAM	Stoppila Sunzu (on loan to Arsenal Tula)
—	DF	BRA	Gabriel (on loan to GNK Dinamo Zagreb)
—	DF	MLI	Youssouf Koné (on loan to Reims)

No.	Pos.	Nation	Player
—	MF	POR	Xeka (on loan to Dijon)
—	MF	POR	Alexis Araujo (on loan to Gazélec Ajaccio)
—	MF	TUN	Naïm Sliti (on loan to Dijon)
—	FW	POR	Eder (on loan to Lokomotiv Moscow)

== Competitions ==
=== Ligue 1 ===
==== League table ====
Pos	Team	Pld	W	D	L	GF	GA	GD	Pts	Qualification or relegation
15	Strasbourg	38	9	11	18	44	67	−23	38	
16	Caen	38	10	8	20	27	52	−25	38	
17	Lille	38	10	8	20	41	67	−26	38	
18	Toulouse (O)	38	9	10	19	38	54	−16	37	Qualification for the relegation play-off final
19	Troyes (R)	38	9	6	23	32	59	−27	33	Relegation to Ligue 2

Source: Ligue 1 and Soccerway
Rules for classification: 1) Points; 2) Goal difference; 3) Head-to-head points; 4) Head-to-head goal difference; 5) Head-to-head goals scored; 6) Head-to-head away goals; 7) Goals scored; 8) Away goals scored; 9) Most goals scored in one league match; 10) Fair-play points
(O) Play-off winners; (R) Relegated

==== Results summary ====
Overall								Home						Away					
Pld	W	D	L	GF	GA	GD	Pts	W	D	L	GF	GA	GD	W	D	L	GF	GA	GD
38	10	8	20	41	67	−26	38	6	6	7	24	27	−3	4	2	13	17	40	−23

Last updated: 19 May 2018.
Source: Ligue 1

==== Results by round ====
Round	1	2	3	4	5	6	7	8	9	10	11	12	13	14	15	16	17	18	19	20	21	22	23	24	25	26	27	28	29	30	31	32	33	34	35	36	37	38
Ground	H	A	H	A	H	A	H	A	H	A	H	A	H	A	A	H	A	A	H	A	H	A	H	H	A	H	H	A	H	A	H	A	H	A	H	A	H	A
Result	W	L	L	D	D	L	L	L	D	L	L	W	W	L	W	W	L	L	D	W	L	L	W	L	D	D	L	L	D	L	L	L	D	L	W	W	W	L
Position	3	9	13	13	16	17	18	18	16	19	19	19	19	19	18	17	18	18	18	15	17	18	17	18	16	17	19	19	19	19	19	19	18	19	19	16	15	17

Source: Ligue 1
A = Away; H = Home; W = Win; D = Draw; L = Loss

==== Matches ====
6 August 2017 1	Lille	3–0	Nantes	Lille
14:00 CEST (UTC+2)	Alonso 48'; Benzia (yellow card) 61'; De Préville 67' (pen.); El Ghazi 70', (yellow card) 71'	Report	Pallios (yellow card) 40'; Nakoulma (yellow card) 58'; Gillet (yellow card) 75'	Stadium: Stade Pierre-Mauroy; Attendance: 30,683; Referee: Benoît Millot

13 August 2017 2	Strasbourg	3–0	Lille	Strasbourg
14:00 CEST (UTC+2)	Corgnet (yellow card) 63'; Martin 74'; Liénard 38' (pen.); Grimm 88'	Report	Ballo-Touré (yellow card) 33'; Maignan (red card) 63'; Ié (yellow card) 81'	Stadium: Stade de la Meinau; Attendance: 25,591; Referee: Johan Hamel

20 August 2017 3	Lille	0–2	Caen	Lille
14:00 CEST (UTC+2)	Pépé (yellow card) 64'; Amadou (yellow card) 65'	Report	Da Silva 5', (yellow card) 37'; Santini 69'; Guilbert (yellow card) 79'	Stadium: Stade Pierre-Mauroy; Attendance: 28,740; Referee: Karim Abed

27 August 2017 4	Angers	1–1	Lille	Angers
16:00 CEST (UTC+2)	Pavlovic (yellow card) 21'; Andreu (yellow card) 52'; Coulibaly 61'	Report	Pépé (yellow card) 16'; Luiz Araújo (yellow card) 23'; El Ghazi (yellow card) 44'; Amadou (yellow card) 51'; De Préville 68'; Ponce (yellow card) 80'	Stadium: Stade Raymond Kopa; Attendance: 10,284; Referee: Nicolas Rainville

8 September 2017 5	Lille	0–0	Bordeaux	Lille
18:00 CEST (UTC+2)	Thiago Maia (yellow card) 15' (yellow-red card) 32'; Benzia (yellow card) 36'; Bissouma (yellow card) 83'	Report	Otávio (yellow card) 5'; Jovanovic (yellow card) 44'; Kamano (yellow card) 64'; Vada (yellow card) 74'	Stadium: Stade Pierre-Mauroy; Attendance: 27,464; Referee: Francois Letexier

16 September 2017 6	Guingamp	1–0	Lille	Guingamp
17:00 CEST (UTC+2)	Deaux (yellow card) 90'; Didot 90+3'	Report	Benzia (yellow card) 56'	Stadium: Stade de Roudourou; Attendance: 11,901; Referee: Jérôme Brisard

22 September 2017 7	Lille	0–4	Monaco	Lille
19:45 CEST (UTC+2)	Ponce (yellow card) 88'	Report	Jovetic 24'; Ghezzal 30', (yellow card) 61'; Falcao 48', 74' (pen.); Jemerson (yellow card) 70'	Stadium: Stade Pierre-Mauroy; Attendance: 34,146; Referee: Frank Schneider

14 October 2017 9	Lille	2–2	Troyes	Lille
19:00 CEST (UTC+2)	Luiz Araújo 12'; Pépé (yellow card) 66'; Mendes 74'; Ié (red card) 90+1'	Report	Darbion 3'; Dingomé (yellow card) 50'; Traoré (yellow card) 69'; Niane 90+3' (pen.)	Stadium: Stade Pierre-Mauroy; Attendance: 29,518; Referee: Hakim Ben El Hadj

21 October 2017 10	Stade Rennais	1–0	Lille	Rennes
19:00 CEST (UTC+2)	Bourigeaud 6'; Bensebaini (yellow card) 78'	Report	Mendes (yellow card) 20'; Ballo-Touré (yellow card) 38'; Mendyl (red card) 85'	Stadium: Roazhon Park; Attendance: 21,852; Referee: Olivier Thual

29 October 2017 11	Lille	0–1	Marseille	Lille
20:00 CET (UTC+1)	Ié (yellow card) 70'; Mendes (yellow card) 84'	Report	Sanson 5'; Evra (yellow card) 10'; Gustavo (yellow card) 45'; Rami (yellow card) 51'	Stadium: Stade Pierre-Mauroy; Attendance: 43,948; Referee: Francois Letexier

5 November 2017 12	Metz	0–3	Lille	Metz
16:00 CET (UTC+1)	Cohade (yellow card) 33'; Nguette (yellow card) 37'; Balliu (yellow card) 87'	Report	Bahlouli (yellow card) 35', (goal) 67'; Luiz Araújo (yellow card) 44'; Pépé 45' (pen.)	Stadium: Stade Saint-Symphorien; Attendance: 12,506; Referee: Jérôme Brisard

17 November 2017 13	Lille	3–1	Saint-Étienne	Lille
18:00 CET (UTC+1)	Pépé 20'; Malcuit (yellow card) 25'; Mendes 71'; Ballo-Touré (yellow card) 81'; Ponce 89'	Report	Perrin (yellow card) 12'; Pierre-Gabriel (yellow card) 19'; Bamba 45' (pen.); Dabo (yellow card) 76'	Stadium: Stade Pierre-Mauroy; Attendance: 28,019; Referee: Johan Hamel

20 November 2017 8	Amiens	3–0	Lille	Amiens
18:00 CET (UTC+1)	Manzala 36', 48'; Ielsch (yellow card) 60'; Adénon (yellow card) 64'; N'Gosso (yellow card) 79'; Konaté 85'	Report	Amadou (yellow card) 21'; Ballo-Touré (yellow card) 78'	Stadium: Stade de la Licorne; Attendance: 9,015; Referee: Mikael Lesage

25 November 2017 14	Montpellier	3–0	Lille	Montpellier
19:00 CET (UTC+1)	Roussillon 5'; Sio 26'; Ninga 31'; Hilton (yellow card) 38'	Report	Luiz Araújo (yellow card) 35'; Pépé (yellow card) 45+3'; Bissouma (yellow card) 49'; Soumaoro (yellow card) 74'; Alonso (yellow card) 74'; Ié (yellow card) 81'	Stadium: Stade de la Mosson; Attendance: 11,370; Referee: Thomas Leonard

29 November 2017 15	Lyon	1–2	Lille	Lyon
18:00 CET (UTC+1)	Díaz 36'	Report	Mendes 21'; Ponce 40'; Ballo-Touré (yellow card) 46'	Stadium: Parc Olympique Lyonnais; Attendance: 31,679; Referee: Jérôme Miguelgorry

2 December 2017 16	Lille	1–0	Toulouse	Lille
19:00 CET (UTC+1)	Soumaoro (yellow card) 45'; Pépé 63'; Bahlouli (yellow card) 81'	Report	Boisgard (yellow card) 49'; Blin (yellow card) 61'; Yago (yellow card) 71'	Stadium: Stade Pierre-Mauroy; Attendance: 29,287; Referee: Benoît Millot

9 December 2017 17	Paris Saint-Germain	3–1	Lille	Paris
16:00 CET (UTC+1)	Di María 28'; Pastore 49'; Verratti (yellow card) 66'; Alves (yellow card) 75'; Mbappé 90+3'	Report	Benzia (yellow card) 79'; El Ghazi 86'; Ié (yellow card) 90'	Stadium: Parc des Princes; Attendance: 47,176; Referee: Johan Hamel

16 December 2017 18	Dijon	3–0	Lille	Dijon
19:00 CET (UTC+1)	Saïd 12', 17'; Ballo-Touré 35' (o.g.); Marié (yellow card) 80'	Report	Luiz Araújo (yellow card) 88'	Stadium: Stade Gaston Gérard; Attendance: 10,634; Referee: Thomas Leonard

20 December 2017 19	Lille	1–1	Nice	Lille
19:50 CET (UTC+1)	Thiago Maia (yellow card) 19'; Ié (yellow card) 44'; El Ghazi 68'	Report	Srarfi 38', (yellow card) 61'; Marlon (yellow card) 54'; Mendy (yellow card) 80'; Koziello (yellow card) 90+3'	Stadium: Stade Pierre-Mauroy; Attendance: 26,450; Referee: Frank Schneider

13 January 2018 20	Caen	0–1	Lille	Caen
20:00 CET (UTC+1)	Djiku (yellow card) 36'; Aït Bennasser (yellow card) 44'; Vercoutre (red card) 44'; Da Silva (yellow card) 68'	Report	Thiago Maia (yellow card) 41'; Pépé 44'; Ballo-Touré (red card) 52'; Benzia (yellow card) 62'; Soumaré (yellow card) 69'	Stadium: Stade Michel d'Ornano; Attendance: 18,283; Referee: Johan Hamel

17 January 2018 21	Lille	1–2	Rennes	Lille
18:00 CET (UTC+1)	Alonso 41', (yellow card) 90+4'	Report	Léa Siliki 85'; André 89'	Stadium: Stade Pierre-Mauroy; Attendance: 27,816; Referee: Mikael Lesage

20 January 2018 22	Troyes	1–0	Lille	Troyes
19:00 CET (UTC+1)	Niane 45'	Report	Benzia (yellow card) 45'; Luiz Araújo (yellow card) 77'	Stadium: Stade de l'Aube; Attendance: 9,269; Referee: Stéphane Jochem

28 January 2018 23	Lille	2–1	Strasbourg	Lille
14:00 CET (UTC+1)	Dabila (yellow card) 28'; El Gahzi 76'; Ié 90'	Report	Lala (yellow card) 52'; Saadi 78'	Stadium: Stade Pierre-Mauroy; Attendance: 27,462; Referee: Sébastien Desiage

3 February 2018 24	Lille	0–3	Paris Saint-Germain	Lille
17:00 CET (UTC+1)	Alonso (yellow card) 73'	Report	Berchiche 45'; Verratti (yellow card) 55'; Neymar 76'; Lo Celso 86'	Stadium: Stade Pierre-Mauroy; Attendance: 49,082; Referee: Johan Hamel

11 February 2018 25	Nantes	2–2	Lille	Nantes
17:00	Sala 16', 71'	Report	Benzia (yellow card) 43'; Mothiba 67'; Pépé 81'	Stadium: Stade de la Beaujoire; Attendance: 22,655; Referee: Mikael Lesage

17 February 2018 26	Lille	2–2	Lyon	Lille
17:00	Pépé 65'; Luiz Araújo 81'	Report	Traoré 21', 44'; Rafael (yellow card) 28'; Diakhaby (yellow card) 60'; Fekir (yellow card) 87'; Aouar (yellow card) 90+1'	Stadium: Stade Pierre-Mauroy; Attendance: 39,523; Referee: Benoît Millot

24 February 2018 27	Lille	1–2	Angers	Lille
19:00	Pépé 88'	Report	Toko Ekambi 73', 89'; Mangani (yellow card) 80'; Capelle (yellow card) 82'	Stadium: Stade Pierre-Mauroy; Attendance: 28,629; Referee: François Letexier

2 March 2018 28	Nice	2–1	Lille	Nice
19:00 CET (UTC+01:00)	Balotelli 5'; Marlon (yellow card) 21'; Cyprien (yellow card) 28', (goal) 80'; Coly (yellow card) 73'	Report	Mothiba (yellow card) 35'; Luiz Araújo 51'	Stadium: Allianz Riviera; Attendance: 20,314; Referee: Thomas Léonard

10 March 2018 29	Lille	1–1	Montpellier	Lille
19:00 CET (UTC+01:00)	Benzia (yellow card) 32'; Pépé 41'; Mendes (yellow card) 87'	Report	Congré (yellow card) 34'; Roussillon 64'; Mendes (yellow card) 87'	Stadium: Stade Pierre-Mauroy; Attendance: 28,609; Referee: Sébastien Moreira

16 March 2018 30	Monaco	2–1	Lille	Monaco
20:45 CET (UTC+01:00)	Lopes 43'; Jovetić 60'; Moutinho (yellow card) 67'; Subašić (yellow card) 90+2'	Report	Mothiba 16'	Stadium: Stade Louis II; Attendance: 7,147; Referee: Clément Turpin

1 April 2018 31	Lille	0–1	Amiens	Lille
16:00 CET (UTC+01:00)		Report	Mendoza 53'; Adenon (yellow card) 66'; Cissokho (yellow card) 76'	Stadium: Stade Pierre-Mauroy; Attendance: 0 Referee: Karim Abed

7 April 2018 32	Bordeaux	2–1	Lille	Bordeaux
20:00	Kamano 42', 45'; Poundjé (yellow card) 72'	Report	Mothiba 14'; Mendyl (yellow card) 24'; Mendes (yellow card) 61' (yellow-red card) 63'	Stadium: Nouveau Stade de Bordeaux; Attendance: 34,997; Referee: Thomas Leonard

14 April 2018 33	Lille	2–2	Guingamp	Lille
19:00	Malcuit (yellow card) 23'; Ié (yellow card) 45'; Pépé 55'; Luiz Araújo 57'	Report	Coco (yellow card) 20'; Alonso 90' (o.g.); Briand 90+1'	Stadium: Stade Pierre-Mauroy; Attendance: 33,461; Referee: Benoît Bastien

21 April 2018 34	Marseille	5–1	Lille	Marseille
17:00 CEST (UTC+02:00)	Thauvin 12', 30' (pen.); Mitroglou 35', 38'; Ocampos 68'	Report	Mendyl (yellow card) 29'; Benzia 54'	Stadium: Stade Vélodrome; Attendance: 51,098; Referee: Amaury Delerue

28 April 2018 35	Lille	3–1	Metz	Lille
19:00	Luiz Araújo 13'; Pépé 45'; Bissouma 77'	Report	Niakhaté (yellow card) 22'; Roux 49'; Diagné (yellow card) 86'	Stadium: Stade Pierre-Mauroy; Attendance: 38,429; Referee: François Letexier

6 May 2018 36	Toulouse	2–3	Lille	Toulouse
17:00 CEST (UTC+02:00)	Jean 9'; Jullien 44'	Report	Pépé 5', 82'; Bissouma 80'	Stadium: Stadium de Toulouse; Attendance: 26,251; Referee: Clément Turpin

12 May 2018 37	Lille	2–1	Dijon	Lille
20:00	Mothiba 18', 45'	Report	Haddadi (yellow card) 10'; Kwon 11', (yellow card) 34'	Stadium: Stade Pierre-Mauroy; Attendance: 46,342; Referee: Nicolas Rainville

19 May 2018 38	Saint-Étienne	5–0	Lille	Saint-Étienne
21:00 CEST (UTC+02:00)	Bamba 7'; Hamouma 13', 40', 61'; Selnæs (yellow card) 58'; Malcuit 66' (o.g.)	Report	Mothiba (yellow card) 61'	Stadium: Stade Geoffroy-Guichard; Attendance: 33,665; Referee: François Letexier

=== Coupe de France ===
6 January 2018 Round of 64	Le Mans	2–4	Lille	Le Mans
15:00 CET	Schur 23'; Créhin 29' (pen.); Hafidi (yellow card) 37'; Bamba (yellow card) 65'; Suchet (yellow card) 87'	Report	Ponce 8'; Pépé 12'; Thiago Maia 34'; Malcuit (yellow card) 42'; Mendes 90+6'	Stadium: MMArena; Attendance: 20,000; Referee: Jeremy Stinat

25 January 2018 Round of 32	Strasbourg	2–1	Lille	Strasbourg
21:05 CET	Grimm (yellow card) 27'; Da Costa 31'; Saadi 48'	Report	Bissouma 54'; Ponce (yellow card) 55'; Mendyl (yellow card) 79'	Stadium: Stade de la Meinau; Attendance: 10,097; Referee: Clément Turpin

=== Coupe de la Ligue ===
25 October 2017 Third round	Lille	2–2 (5–4 p)	Valenciennes	Villeneuve-d'Ascq
18:45 CEST	Benzia 14'; Alonso (yellow card) 41', (goal) 74'; Ié (yellow card) 83'	Report	Pierre-Charles (yellow card) 15', (goal) 44'; Xavier (yellow card) 17'; Aloé (yellow card) 67'; Mothiba 90+1' (pen.)	Stadium: Stade Pierre-Mauroy; Attendance: 30,643; Referee: Frank Schneider
	Penalties
	Ié (penalty missed); Alonso (penalty scored); Bahlouli (penalty scored); El Ghazi (penalty scored); Soumaré (penalty missed); Thiago Maia (penalty scored); Mendes (penalty scored)		(penalty scored) Néry; (penalty missed) Diarra; (penalty scored) Mauricio; (penalty missed) Ramaré; (penalty scored) Guezoui; (penalty scored) Mothiba; (penalty missed) Pierre-Charles

13 December 2017 Round of 16	Lille	1–1 (2–3 p)	Nice	Villeneuve-d'Ascq
21:05 (UTC+1)	Luiz Araújo 7', (yellow card) 46'	Report	Marlon (yellow card) 27'; Balotelli 58'	Stadium: Stade Pierre-Mauroy; Attendance: 9,651; Referee: Stéphane Jochem
	Penalties
	Luiz Araújo (penalty missed); Alonso (penalty missed); Mendes (penalty scored); El Ghazi (penalty scored); Bissouma (penalty missed)		(penalty scored) Lees-Melou; (penalty missed) Cyprien; (penalty scored) Pléa; (penalty scored) Seri

== Statistics ==
=== Appearances and goals ===
No.	Pos	Nat	Player	Total		Ligue 1		Coupe de France		Coupe de la Ligue	
No.	Pos	Nat	Player	Apps	Goals	Apps	Goals	Apps	Goals	Apps	Goals
Goalkeepers
1	GK	(Slovakia) SVK	Adam Jakubech	0	0	0	0	0	0	0	0
16	GK	(France) FRA	Mike Maignan	36	0	34	0	1	0	1	0
30	GK	(Burkina Faso) BFA	Kouakou Koffi	6	0	4	0	1	0	1	0
Defenders
2	DF	(France) FRA	Kévin Malcuit	25	0	21+2	0	1	0	0+1	0
3	DF	(Paraguay) PAR	Júnior Alonso	38	3	30+4	2	2	0	2	1
5	DF	(France) FRA	Adama Soumaoro	15	0	14	0	1	0	0	0
15	DF	(Portugal) POR	Edgar Ié	37	1	35	1	0	0	2	0
22	DF	(Ivory Coast) CIV	Kouadio-Yves Dabila	15	0	10+2	0	1+1	0	1	0
25	DF	(France) FRA	Fodé Ballo-Touré	28	0	25+2	0	0	0	1	0
27	DF	(Morocco) MAR	Hamza Mendyl	14	0	9+3	0	1	0	1	0
Midfielders
6	MF	(France) FRA	Ibrahim Amadou	32	0	30	0	2	0	0	0
14	MF	(France) FRA	Imad Faraj	8	0	1+6	0	0+1	0	0	0
17	MF	(France) FRA	Valère Pollet	0	0	0	0	0	0	0	0
20	MF	(Brazil) BRA	Thiago Maia	37	1	28+6	0	1	1	2	0
21	MF	(Mali) MLI	Yves Bissouma	28	3	15+9	2	1+1	1	2	0
23	MF	(Brazil) BRA	Thiago Mendes	35	4	27+4	3	1+1	1	1+1	0
26	MF	(France) FRA	Farès Bahlouli	14	1	2+9	1	1	0	2	0
29	MF	(Mali) MLI	Rominigue Kouamé	6	0	1+5	0	0	0	0	0
32	MF	(France) FRA	Boubakary Soumaré	17	0	3+11	0	1	0	1+1	0
Forwards
7	FW	(Netherlands) NED	Anwar El Ghazi	31	4	19+8	4	1+1	0	2	0
9	FW	(Argentina) ARG	Ezequiel Ponce	32	3	8+20	2	2	1	1+1	0
10	FW	(Algeria) ALG	Yassine Benzia	33	2	30+1	1	1	0	0+1	1
11	FW	(Brazil) BRA	Luiz Araújo	36	6	24+10	5	1	0	1	1
18	FW	(South Africa) RSA	Lebo Mothiba	14	5	14	5	0	0	0	0
19	FW	(Ivory Coast) CIV	Nicolas Pépé	38	14	31+5	13	1+1	1	0	0
Players transferred out during the season
8	MF	(Portugal) POR	Xeka	1	0	0+1	0	0	0	0	0
12	FW	(France) FRA	Nicolas de Préville	4	2	3+1	2	0	0	0	0

Last updated: 19 May 2018
Source: Competitions
