= 2020–21 AS Monaco FC season =

Monaco
2020–21 season
- President: Dmitry Rybolovlev
- Head coach: Robert Moreno (until 19 July); Niko Kovač (from 19 July)
- Stadium: Stade Louis II
- Ligue 1: 3rd
- Coupe de France: Runners-up
- Top goalscorer: League: Wissam Ben Yedder (20); All: Wissam Ben Yedder (22)
Home colours	Away colours	Third colours

The 2020–21 season was Monaco's eighth consecutive season in Ligue 1 since promotion from Ligue 2 in 2013.

== Season events ==
On 19 July, AS Monaco announced the departure of Robert Moreno as their manager, and later the same day announced the appointment of Niko Kovač as manager on a three-year contract.

=== Transfers ===
==== Summer ====
On 4 June, AS Monaco announced that they had agreed a deal for Kévin N'Doram to make his loan deal at FC Metz a permanent transfer.

On 25 June, Everton announced that they had agreed a deal with AS Monaco to extend the loan of Djibril Sidibé until the end of their season. On 29 June, AS Monaco confirmed this, along with Gil Dias' loan being extended until the end of the 2019–20 La Liga season.

On 26 June, AS Monaco announced that they had agreed a deal for Anthony Musaba to join from NEC Nijmegen on a five-year contract, with the deal to be concluded upon the opening of the international transfer window on 1 July 2020.

On 30 June, AS Monaco announced that Romain Faivre would be leaving the club to join Stade Brest.

On 1 July, AS Monaco confirmed that the loan deals for Pelé, Jordi Mboula and Antonio Barreca had all been extended until the end of their respective seasons.

On 8 July, Benjamin Henrichs moved to RB Leipzig on a season-long loan deal, with the option for RB Leipzig to make the move permanent.

On 7 August, AS Monaco announced the signing of Axel Disasi to a five-year contract from Reims.

On 10 August, AS Monaco signed their first professional contract with Jonathan Bakali.

On 11 August, AS Monaco announced that Kamil Glik would be leaving the club to join Benevento, with Nabil Alioui joining Le Havre the following day.

On 13 August, Francesco Antonucci left AS Monaco to sign for Feyenoord, whilst Lyle Foster made a permanent move to Vitória de Guimarães.

On 21 August, Julien Serrano joined Livingston on a season-long loan deal.

On 24 August, Anthony Musaba joined Cercle Brugge on a season-long loan deal.

On 26 August, Wilson Isidor joined Bastia-Borgo on a season-long loan deal, whilst Jonathan Panzo left the club to sign for Dijon.

On 27 August, AS Monaco announced the signing of Caio Henrique from Atlético Madrid to a five-year contract.

On 2 September, AS Monaco announced the signing of Kevin Volland from Bayer Leverkusen to a four-year contract.

On 8 September, Adrien Bongiovanni joined Den Bosch on a season-long loan deal.

On 10 September, Nacer Chadli Left AS Monaco to sign permanently with İstanbul Başakşehir. The following day, 11 September, AS Monaco announced the signing of Vito Mannone on a two-year contract after his Reading contract had expired at the end of the previous season, whilst Adama Traoré moved permanently to Hatayspor and Jean Marcelin joined Cercle Brugge on a season-long loan deal.

On 17 September, Jordi Mboula left AS Monaco to sign for Real Mallorca.

On 23 September, Loïc Badiashile was loaned to Las Rozas for the season, whilst Florentino Luís joined AS Monaco on a season-long loan deal on 25 September.

On 25 September, Gil Dias was loaned to Famalicão for the season, whilst on 29 September, Pelé returned to Rio Ave on a season-long loan and Jean-Eudes Aholou returned to RC Strasbourg on a similar deal. The following day Keita Baldé moved on loan to Sampdoria for the season.

On 1 October, Gabriel Pereira joined Lazio on a season long loan deal, with Jorge joining Basel on a similar deal the following day.

On 5 October, Yoann Etienne moved from AS Monaco to Lorient, Antonio Barreca joined Fiorentina on loan for the season, and Giulian Biancone extended is contract with AS Monaco until the summer of 2024 and joined Cercle Brugge on loan for the season. The next day, 6 October, Arthur Zagre moved to Dijon on loan for the season.

On 17 October, Russian forward Kirill Klimov moved to Rubin Kazan.

==== Winter ====
On 21 January, defender Strahinja Pavlović joined Cercle Brugge on loan for the remainder of the season, whilst the following day, 22 January, Monaco announced the signing of Krépin Diatta from Club Brugge on a five-year contract. On 25 January, Henry Onyekuru was loaned to Galatasaray for the remainder of the season.

== Squad ==
As of match played 23 May 2021

No.	Player	Nationality	Position	Date of birth (age)	Signed from	Signed in	Contract ends	Apps.	Goals
Goalkeepers
1	Radosław Majecki	(Poland)	GK	16 November 1999 (age 26)	Legia Warsaw	2020	2024	13	0
30	Vito Mannone	(Italy)	GK	2 March 1988 (age 38)	Reading	2020	2022	9	0
40	Benjamin Lecomte	(France)	GK	26 April 1991 (age 35)	Montpellier	2019	2024	60	0
Defenders
2	Fodé Ballo-Touré	(Senegal)	DF	3 January 1997 (age 29)	Lille	2019	2023	74	0
3	Guillermo Maripán	(Chile)	DF	6 May 1994 (age 32)	Deportivo Alavés	2019	2024	55	7
20	Axel Disasi	(France)	DF	11 March 1998 (age 28)	Reims	2020	2025	35	3
26	Ruben Aguilar	(France)	DF	26 April 1993 (age 33)	Montpellier	2019	2024	61	3
29	Djibril Sidibé	(France)	DF	29 July 1992 (age 34)	Lille	2016	2022	144	6
32	Benoît Badiashile	(France)	DF	6 March 2001 (age 25)	Academy	2016		85	3
34	Chrislain Matsima	(France)	DF	15 May 2002 (age 24)	Academy	2019		11	0
Midfielders
4	Cesc Fàbregas	(Spain)	MF	4 May 1987 (age 39)	Chelsea	2019	2022	62	4
8	Aurélien Tchouaméni	(France)	MF	27 January 2000 (age 26)	Girondins de Bordeaux	2020	2024	45	3
11	Gelson Martins	(Portugal)	MF	11 May 1995 (age 31)	Atlético Madrid	2019	2024	67	11
12	Caio Henrique	(Brazil)	MF	31 July 1997 (age 29)	Atlético Madrid	2020	2025	36	0
17	Aleksandr Golovin	(Russia)	MF	30 May 1996 (age 30)	CSKA Moscow	2018	2023	91	13
22	Youssouf Fofana	(France)	MF	10 January 1999 (age 27)	Strasbourg	2020	2024	47	0
27	Krépin Diatta	(Senegal)	MF	25 February 1999 (age 27)	Club Brugge	2021	2025	16	1
35	Florentino Luís	(Portugal)	MF	19 August 1999 (age 27)	loan from Benfica	2020	2021	11	0
36	Eliot Matazo	(Belgium)	MF	15 February 2002 (age 24)	Anderlecht	2018		14	1
37	Sofiane Diop	(France)	MF	9 June 2000 (age 26)	Rennes	2018		56	7
38	Enzo Millot	(France)	MF	17 July 2002 (age 24)	Academy	2018		3	0
Forwards
9	Wissam Ben Yedder	(France)	FW	12 August 1990 (age 36)	Sevilla	2019	2024	72	41
10	Stevan Jovetić	(Montenegro)	FW	2 November 1989 (age 37)	Inter Milan	2017		77	21
13	Willem Geubbels	(France)	FW	16 August 2001 (age 25)	Lyon	2018		17	1
19	Pietro Pellegri	(Italy)	FW	17 March 2001 (age 25)	Genoa	2018		22	2
31	Kevin Volland	(Germany)	FW	30 July 1992 (age 34)	Bayer Leverkusen	2020	2024	40	18
33	Valentin Decarpentrie	(France)	FW	6 January 2002 (age 24)	Academy	2020		1	0
	Gobé Gouano	(France)	FW	10 December 2000 (age 25)	Academy	2018		1	0
	Jonathan Bakali	(France)	FW	29 March 2002 (age 24)	Youth team	2020	2023	0	0
Also under contract
	Youssef Aït Bennasser	(Morocco)	MF	7 July 1996 (age 30)	Nancy	2016		18	0
Players away on loan
6	Jean-Eudes Aholou	(Ivory Coast)	MF	20 March 1994 (age 32)	Strasbourg	2018	2023	23	0
7	Henry Onyekuru	(Nigeria)	MF	5 June 1997 (age 29)	Everton	2019	2024	8	0
14	Keita Baldé	(Senegal)	FW	8 March 1995 (age 31)	Lazio	2017		60	16
15	Jean Marcelin	(France)	DF	12 February 2000 (age 26)	Auxerre	2020	2024	0	0
18	Arthur Zagre	(France)	DF	4 October 2001 (age 25)	Paris Saint-Germain	2019	2022	3	0
21	Strahinja Pavlović	(Serbia)	DF	24 May 2001 (age 25)	Partizan	2020	2024	1	0
27	Anthony Musaba	(Netherlands)	FW	6 December 2000 (age 25)	NEC Nijmegen	2020	2025	0	0
28	Jorge	(Brazil)	DF	28 March 1996 (age 30)	Flamengo	2017		34	2
41	Giulian Biancone	(France)	DF	31 March 2000 (age 26)	Academy	2018	2024	7	1
	Gabriel Pereira	(Brazil)	GK	7 February 2002 (age 24)	Grêmio	2019		0	0
	Loïc Badiashile	(France)	GK	5 February 1998 (age 28)	SC Malesherbes	2013	2021	6	0
	Julien Serrano	(France)	DF	13 February 1998 (age 28)	Le Pontet	2013	2022	11	0
	Antonio Barreca	(Italy)	DF	18 March 1995 (age 31)	Torino	2018	2023	9	0
	Adrien Bongiovanni	(Belgium)	MF	20 September 1999 (age 27)	Standard Liège	2015		1	0
	Gil Dias	(Portugal)	MF	28 September 1996 (age 30)	Braga B	2015		17	0
	Pelé	(Guinea-Bissau)	MF	29 September 1991 (age 35)	Rio Ave	2018	2023	11	0
	Wilson Isidor	(France)	FW	27 August 2000 (age 26)	Rennes	2018		3	0
Left during the season
5	Jemerson	(Brazil)	DF	24 August 1992 (age 34)	Atlético Mineiro	2016	2021	101	2
31	Nacer Chadli	(Belgium)	MF	2 August 1989 (age 37)	West Bromwich Albion	2018	2021	21	0
35	Jonathan Panzo	(England)	DF	25 October 2000 (age 26)	Chelsea	2018		3	0
39	Benjamin Henrichs	(Germany)	DF	23 February 1997 (age 29)	Bayer 04 Leverkusen	2018	2023	43	1
	Adama Traoré	(Mali)	MF	28 June 1995 (age 31)	Lille	2015		27	5
	Jordi Mboula	(Spain)	MF	16 March 1999 (age 27)	Barcelona B	2018	2022	10	1
	Samuel Grandsir	(France)	FW	14 August 1996 (age 30)	Troyes	2018	2023	17	1

=== Reserves ===
As of 17 October 2020

Note: Flags indicate national team as defined under FIFA eligibility rules; some limited exceptions apply. Players may hold more than one non-FIFA nationality.

No.	Pos.	Nation	Player
—	GK	BEL	Clément Bamélis
—	DF	SRB	Boris Popović
—	DF	POR	Amilcar Silva
—	MF	LTU	Edgaras Utkus
—	MF	FRA	Florian Antognelli

No.	Pos.	Nation	Player
—	MF	MLI	Salam Jiddou
—	MF	ITA	Giuseppe Iglio
—	FW	GHA	Eric Ayiah
—	FW	ITA	Nicolo Cudrig

== Transfers ==
=== In ===
Date	Position	Nationality	Player	From	Fee	Ref.
26 June 2020†	FW	(Netherlands)	Anthony Musaba	NEC Nijmegen	Undisclosed	
7 August 2020	DF	(France)	Axel Disasi	Reims	Undisclosed	
27 August 2020	MF	(Brazil)	Caio Henrique	Atlético Madrid	Undisclosed	
2 September 2020	FW	(Germany)	Kevin Volland	Bayer Leverkusen	Undisclosed	
11 September 2020	GK	(Italy)	Vito Mannone	Reading	Free	
22 January 2021	MF	(Senegal)	Krépin Diatta	Club Brugge	Undisclosed	

=== Loans in ===
Date from	Position	Nationality	Player	From	Date to	Ref.
25 September 2020	MF	(Portugal)	Florentino Luís	Benfica	End of Season	

=== Out ===
Date	Position	Nationality	Player	To	Fee	Ref.
4 June 2020†	MF	(France)	Kévin N'Doram	Metz	Undisclosed	
30 June 2020†	MF	(France)	Romain Faivre	Brest	Undisclosed	
11 August 2020	DF	(Poland)	Kamil Glik	Benevento	Undisclosed	
12 August 2020	FW	(France)	Nabil Alioui	Le Havre	Undisclosed	
13 August 2020	MF	(Belgium)	Francesco Antonucci	Feyenoord	Undisclosed	
13 August 2020	FW	(South Africa)	Lyle Foster	Vitória de Guimarães	Undisclosed	
26 August 2020	DF	(England)	Jonathan Panzo	Dijon	Undisclosed	
10 September 2020	MF	(Belgium)	Nacer Chadli	İstanbul Başakşehir	Undisclosed	
11 September 2020	MF	(Mali)	Adama Traoré	Hatayspor	Undisclosed	
17 September 2020	MF	(Spain)	Jordi Mboula	Mallorca	Undisclosed	
5 October 2020	DF	(France)	Yoann Etienne	Lorient	Undisclosed	
17 October 2020	FW	(Russia)	Kirill Klimov	Rubin Kazan	Undisclosed	
11 March 2021	FW	(France)	Samuel Grandsir	LA Galaxy	Undisclosed	
12 April 2020	DF	(Germany)	Benjamin Henrichs	RB Leipzig	Undisclosed	

† Transfers announced on the above date, became official when the transfer window opened on 1 July.

=== Loans out ===
Date from	Position	Nationality	Player	To	Date to	Ref.
7 August 2019	DF	(France)	Djibril Sidibé	Everton	26 July 2020	
31 January 2020	MF	(France)	Gil Dias	Granada	31 July 2020	
10 July 2019	DF	(Italy)	Antonio Barreca	Genoa	16 August 2020	
6 August 2019	MF	(Guinea-Bissau)	Pelé	Reading	5 August 2020	
29 January 2020	FW	(Spain)	Jordi Mboula	Huesca	5 August 2020	
8 July 2020	DF	(Germany)	Benjamin Henrichs	RB Leipzig	End of Season	
21 August 2020	DF	(France)	Julien Serrano	Livingston	End of Season	
24 August 2020	FW	(Netherlands)	Anthony Musaba	Cercle Brugge	End of Season	
26 August 2020	FW	(France)	Wilson Isidor	Bastia-Borgo	End of Season	
8 September 2020	MF	(Belgium)	Adrien Bongiovanni	Den Bosch	End of Season	
11 September 2020	DF	(France)	Jean Marcelin	Cercle Brugge	End of Season	
23 September 2020	GK	(France)	Loïc Badiashile	Las Rozas	End of Season	
25 September 2020	MF	(Portugal)	Gil Dias	Famalicão	End of Season	
29 September 2020	MF	(Guinea-Bissau)	Pelé	Rio Ave	End of Season	
29 September 2020	MF	(Ivory Coast)	Jean-Eudes Aholou	RC Strasbourg	End of Season	
30 September 2020	FW	(Senegal)	Keita Baldé	Sampdoria	End of Season	
1 October 2020	GK	(Brazil)	Gabriel Pereira	Lazio	End of Season	
2 October 2020	DF	(Brazil)	Jorge	Basel	End of Season	
5 October 2020	DF	(Italy)	Antonio Barreca	Fiorentina	End of Season	
5 October 2020	DF	(France)	Giulian Biancone	Cercle Brugge	End of Season	
6 October 2020	DF	(France)	Arthur Zagre	Dijon	End of Season	
21 January 2021	DF	(Serbia)	Strahinja Pavlović	Cercle Brugge	End of Season	
25 January 2021	MF	(Nigeria)	Henry Onyekuru	Galatasaray	End of Season	

=== Released ===
Date	Position	Nationality	Player	Joined	Date	Ref.
2 November 2020	DF	(Brazil)	Jemerson	Corinthians	5 November 2020	
30 June 2021	GK	(France)	Loïc Badiashile			
30 June 2021	MF	(Belgium)	Adrien Bongiovanni			
30 June 2021	MF	(Morocco)	Youssef Aït Bennasser	Adanaspor	8 September 2021	
30 June 2021	FW	(France)	Gobé Gouano	Aarau	2 September 2021	
30 June 2021	FW	(Montenegro)	Stevan Jovetić	Hertha BSC	27 July 2021	

=== Trial ===
Date from	Position	Nationality	Player	Last club	Date to	Ref.
	GK	(Russia)	Anton Mitryushkin	Sion		

== Friendlies ==
17 July 2020	Cercle Brugge	0–2	AS Monaco	Bruges, Belgium
18:30 CEST (UTC+2)		Report	Ben Yedder 4'; Golovin 7'	Stadium: Jan Breydel Stadium; Attendance: 0

22 July 2020	Standard Liège	2–1	AS Monaco	Seraing, Belgium
18:00 CEST (UTC+2)	Avenatti 88', 90'	Report	Geubbels 19'	Stadium: Stade du Pairay; Attendance: 0

1 August 2020	Eintracht Frankfurt	1–1	AS Monaco	Frankfurt
18:00 CEST (UTC+2)	Paciência 59'	Report	Musaba 85'	Stadium: Deutsche Bank Park; Attendance: 0 Referee: Tobias Welz

15 August 2020	AZ	0–2	AS Monaco	Alkmaar
18:00 CEST (UTC+2)		Report	Golovin 20'; Ben Yedder 74'	Stadium: AFAS Stadion; Attendance: 0 Referee: Kevin Puts

4 September 2020	Nice	2–3	AS Monaco	Nice
18:00 CEST (UTC+2)	Lopes 12'; Guessand 14'	Report	Daniliuc 58' (o.g.); Martins 76'; Onyekuru 88'	Stadium: Allianz Riviera; Attendance: 0

== Competitions ==
Win Draw Loss Fixtures

=== Overview ===
Competition	First match	Last match	Starting round	Final position	Record							
Competition	First match	Last match	Starting round	Final position	Pld	W	D	L	GF	GA	GD	Win %
Ligue 1	23 August 2020	23 May 2021	Matchday 1	3rd	38	24	6	8	76	42	+34	63.16
Coupe de France	10 February 2021	19 May 2021	Round of 64	Runners-up	6	4	1	1	10	3	+7	66.67
Total					44	28	7	9	86	45	+41	63.64

Last updated: 23 May 2021
Source: Soccerway

=== Ligue 1 ===
==== League table ====
Pos	Team	Pld	W	D	L	GF	GA	GD	Pts	Qualification or relegation
1	Lille (C)	38	24	11	3	64	23	+41	83	Qualification for the Champions League group stage
2	Paris Saint-Germain	38	26	4	8	86	28	+58	82	Qualification for the Champions League group stage
3	Monaco	38	24	6	8	76	42	+34	78	Qualification for the Champions League third qualifying round
4	Lyon	38	22	10	6	81	43	+38	76	Qualification for the Europa League group stage (Note: Since the winners of the 2020–21 Coupe de France, Paris Saint-Germain, qualified for European competition based on league position, the Europa League group stage spot reserved for the cup winners was passed to the fifth-placed team, and the Europa Conference League play-off round spot was passed to the sixth-placed team.)
5	Marseille	38	16	12	10	54	47	+7	60	Qualification for the Europa League group stage

Source: Ligue 1
Rules for classification: 1) Points; 2) Goal difference; 3) Goals scored; 4) Head-to-head goal difference; 5) Fairplay ranking.
(C) Champions

==== Results summary ====
Overall								Home						Away					
Pld	W	D	L	GF	GA	GD	Pts	W	D	L	GF	GA	GD	W	D	L	GF	GA	GD
38	24	6	8	76	42	+34	78	12	5	2	43	21	+22	12	1	6	33	21	+12

Last updated: 23 May 2021.
Source: Results

==== Results by matches ====
Round	1	2	3	4	5	6	7	8	9	10	11	12	13	14	15	16	17	18	19	20	21	22	23	24	25	26	27	28	29	30	31	32	33	34	35	36	37	38
Ground	H	A	H	A	H	A	H	A	H	A	H	H	A	A	H	A	H	A	H	A	H	A	H	A	H	A	H	A	H	A	H	H	A	A	H	A	H	A
Result	D	W	W	L	W	L	D	L	W	W	W	W	L	L	L	W	D	W	W	W	W	W	W	W	D	W	W	L	D	W	W	W	W	W	L	W	W	D
Position	6	3	3	6	5	6	8	12	8	5	4	4	5	6	8	7	6	6	4	4	4	4	4	4	4	4	4	4	4	4	3	3	3	3	3	3	3	3

Source: Results
A = Away; H = Home; W = Win; D = Draw; L = Loss; P = Postponed

==== Results ====
23 August 2020 1	AS Monaco	2–2	Reims	Monaco
13:00 CEST (UTC+2)	Disasi 45+2', (yellow card) 90'; Badiashile 55'	Report	Dia 5'; Touré 21'; Kutesa (yellow card) 41'; Faes (yellow card) 76'; Foket (yellow card) 90'	Stadium: Stade Louis II; Attendance: 5,000; Referee: François Letexier

30 August 2020 2	Metz	0–1	AS Monaco	Metz
15:00 CEST (UTC+2)		Report	Aguilar (yellow card) 19'; Badiashile 22'; Fofana (yellow card) 24' (yellow-red card) 47'; Martins (yellow card) 42'; Tchouaméni (yellow card) 49'	Stadium: Stade Saint-Symphorien; Referee: Jérémy Stinat

13 September 2020 3	AS Monaco	2–1	Nantes	Monaco
17:00 CEST (UTC+2)	Diop 5', (yellow card) 7'; Tchouaméni (yellow card) 11'; Geubbels 65', (yellow card) 68'	Report	Touré (yellow card) 9'; Blas 61'	Stadium: Stade Louis II; Referee: Clément Turpin

19 September 2020 4	Rennes	2–1	AS Monaco	Rennes
21:00 CEST (UTC+2)	Nzonzi 81'; Truffert 90+1'; Terrier (yellow card) 90+4'	Report	Ben Yedder 28'; Disasi (yellow card) 68'; Geubbels (yellow card) 76'	Stadium: Roazhon Park; Referee: Jérôme Miguelgorry

27 September 2020 5	AS Monaco	3–2	Strasbourg	Monaco
15:00 CEST (UTC+2)	Ben Yedder 9', 53'; Tchouaméni (yellow card) 21' (yellow-red card) 55'; Ballo-Touré (yellow card) 40'; Aguilar 45+1'; Disasi (red card) 67'	Report	Chahiri 46'; Thomasson (yellow card) 60'; Ajorque 70' (pen.)	Stadium: Stade Louis II; Referee: Jérémie Pignard

4 October 2020 6	Brest	1–0	AS Monaco	Brest
15:00 CEST (UTC+2)	Belkebla (yellow card) 7'; Faivre 8'; Mounié (yellow card) 68'; Lasne (yellow card) 77'	Report	Martins (yellow card) 37'; Volland (yellow card) 52'; Biancone (yellow card) 72'; Matsima (yellow card) 84'	Stadium: Stade Francis-Le Blé; Referee: Johan Hamel

18 October 2020 7	AS Monaco	1–1	Montpellier	Monaco
15:00 CEST (UTC+2)	Ben Yedder 70' (pen.); Pellegri (yellow card) 73'; Geubbels (yellow card) 90+2'	Report	Savanier (red card) 19'; Mavididi 51'; Souquet (yellow card) 90+4'	Stadium: Stade Louis II; Referee: Hakim Ben El Hadj

25 October 2020 8	Lyon	4–1	AS Monaco	Décines-Charpieu
21:00 CET (UTC+1)	Depay 12'; Kadewere (yellow card) 22'; Toko Ekambi 34', 44'; Aouar 41' (pen.); Diomandé (yellow card) 73'; Mendes (yellow card) 82'; Bard (red card) 88'	Report	Sidibé (yellow card) 39'; Ben Yedder 47' (pen.), (yellow card) 90+3'; Matsima (yellow card) 50'; Aguilar (yellow card) 55'	Stadium: Parc Olympique Lyonnais; Referee: Jérôme Brisard

1 November 2020 9	AS Monaco	4–0	Bordeaux	Monaco
17:00 CET (UTC+1)	Ben Yedder 28' (pen.); Martins 30'; Volland 31', 58'; Aguilar (yellow card) 41'; Fàbregas (yellow card) 90'	Report	Pablo (yellow card) 27'; Benito (yellow card) 73'	Stadium: Stade Louis II; Attendance: 0 Referee: Ruddy Buquet

8 November 2020 10	Nice	1–2	AS Monaco	Nice
17:00 CET (UTC+1)	Boudaoui (yellow card) 19'; Lees-Melou 69'; Schneiderlin (yellow card) 69'	Report	Disasi 23'; Diop 53', (yellow card) 69'; Ben Yedder (yellow card) 75'	Stadium: Allianz Riviera; Attendance: 0 Referee: Karim Abed

20 November 2020 11	AS Monaco	3–2	Paris Saint-Germain	Monaco
21:00 CET (UTC+1)	Fofana (yellow card) 36'; Volland 52', 66'; Fàbregas 84' (pen.), (yellow card) 87'	Report	Pereira (yellow card) 20'; Mbappé 25', 37' (pen.); Ruiz-Atil (yellow card) 80'; Diallo (red card) 84'; Kimpembe (yellow card) 88'	Stadium: Stade Louis II; Attendance: 0 Referee: Clément Turpin

29 November 2020 12	AS Monaco	3–0	Nîmes	Monaco
15:00 CET (UTC+1)	Diop 19'; Martins 75'; Volland 77'; Fofana (yellow card) 83'	Report	Denkey (yellow card) 4'; Deaux (red card) 69'	Stadium: Stade Louis II; Attendance: 0 Referee: Antony Gautier

6 December 2020 13	Lille	2–1	AS Monaco	Villeneuve-d'Ascq
13:00 CET (UTC+1)	David 53'; Djaló (yellow card) 64'; Yazıcı 65'; Soumaré (yellow card) 90+2'; Weah (yellow card) 90+2'	Report	Pellegri 90'	Stadium: Stade Pierre-Mauroy; Attendance: 0 Referee: Jérôme Brisard

12 December 2020 14	Marseille	2–1	AS Monaco	Marseille
17:00 CET (UTC+1)	Thauvin 5', (yellow card) 77'; Benedetto 13'; Kamara (yellow card) 76'; Germain (yellow card) 90+4'	Report	Fofana (yellow card) 43'; Ben Yedder 79' (pen.)	Stadium: Stade Vélodrome; Attendance: 0 Referee: Benoît Millot

16 December 2020 15	AS Monaco	0–3	Lens	Monaco
21:00 CET (UTC+1)	Disasi (red card) 23'; Pellegri (yellow card) 76'; Aguilar (yellow card) 89'	Report	Sylla 1'; Gradit (yellow card) 9'; Doucouré (yellow card) 11'; Banza (yellow card) 30', (goal) 33'; Kakuta 39'; Mauricio (yellow card) 80'	Stadium: Stade Louis II; Attendance: 0 Referee: Frank Schneider

20 December 2020 16	Dijon	0–1	AS Monaco	Dijon
15:00 CET (UTC+1)	Chouiar (yellow card) 5'; Ndong (yellow card) 37'	Report	Volland 15'; Tchouaméni (yellow card) 26'	Stadium: Stade Gaston Gérard; Attendance: 0 Referee: Jérémy Stinat

23 December 2020 17	AS Monaco	2–2	Saint-Étienne	Monaco
21:00 CET (UTC+1)	Diop 7'; Maripán (yellow card) 28'; Matazo (red card) 35'; Aguilar (yellow card) 40'; Volland 48', (yellow card) 71'	Report	Debuchy 21'; Bouanga 29' (pen.); Gourna-Douath (yellow card) 44'; Camara (yellow card) 81'	Stadium: Stade Louis II; Attendance: 0 Referee: Johan Hamel

6 January 2021 18	Lorient	2–5	AS Monaco	Lorient
19:00 CET (UTC+1)	Moffi 31'; Laurienté (yellow card) 34'; Delaplace (red card) 48'; Gravillon 67'	Report	Sidibé (yellow card) 3'; Martins (yellow card) 6'; Disasi 9'; Golovin 64'; Diop (yellow card) 66', (goal) 78'; Volland 68'; Maripán 89'	Stadium: Stade du Moustoir; Attendance: 0 Referee: Frank Schneider

9 January 2021 19	AS Monaco	3–0	Angers	Monaco
21:00 CET (UTC+1)	Badiashile (yellow card) 18'; Volland (yellow card) 29', (goal) 72'; Maripán 40'; Jovetić 81'	Report		Stadium: Stade Louis II; Attendance: 0 Referee: Benoît Bastien

15 January 2021 20	Montpellier	2–3	AS Monaco	Montpellier
21:00 CET (UTC+1)	Wahi 64'; Delort 69'; Chotard (yellow card) 83'; Savanier (yellow card) 90'	Report	Fofana (yellow card) 17'; Volland 24'; Ben Yedder 35', 61' (pen.); Aguilar (yellow card) 59'; Maripán (yellow card) 88'	Stadium: Stade de la Mosson; Attendance: 0 Referee: Aurélien Petit

23 January 2021 21	AS Monaco	3–1	Marseille	Monaco
21:00 CET (UTC+1)	Maripán 47'; Tchouaméni 75'; Diatta (yellow card) 81'; Golovin (yellow card) 89'; Jovetić 90+2'; Fofana (yellow card) 90+3'	Report	Radonjić 12'; Balerdi (yellow card) 21'; Sakai (yellow card) 49'; Álvaro (yellow card) 76'; Khaoui (yellow card) 82'; Gueye (yellow card) 90'	Stadium: Stade Louis II; Attendance: 0 Referee: François Letexier

31 January 2021 22	Nantes	1–2	AS Monaco	Nantes
21:00 CET (UTC+1)	Appiah (yellow card) 55'; Pallois (yellow card) 73' (yellow-red card) 73'; Emond 83', (yellow card) 90+2'	Report	Diatta (yellow card) 19'; Fofana (yellow card) 29'; Maripán 45'; Volland 60'; Florentino (yellow card) 90+3'	Stadium: Stade de la Beaujoire; Attendance: 0 Referee: Thomas Léonard

3 February 2021 23	AS Monaco	2–1	Nice	Monaco
21:00 CET (UTC+1)	Ben Yedder 28' (pen.), 51'	Report	Todibo (yellow card) 17'; Claude-Maurice (yellow card) 34'; Schneiderlin (yellow card) 40'; Lees-Melou 47'; Lotomba (yellow card) 50'	Stadium: Stade Louis II; Attendance: 0 Referee: Jérôme Brisard

7 February 2021 24	Nîmes	3–4	AS Monaco	Nîmes
15:00 CET (UTC+1)	Deaux 23'; Ferhat 32'; Meling (yellow card) 37'; Eliasson 81'	Report	Golovin 3', 12', 62'; Ballo-Touré (yellow card) 4'; Badiashile (yellow card) 58'; Volland 77'	Stadium: Stade des Costières; Attendance: 0 Referee: Clément Turpin

14 February 2021 25	AS Monaco	2–2	Lorient	Monaco
13:00 CET (UTC+1)	Lecomte (yellow card) 6'; Diop (yellow card) 39'; Tchouaméni (yellow card) 45'; Ben Yedder 48' (pen.), 90+3'	Report	Moffi 7' (pen.), 62'; Mendes (yellow card) 35'; Dreyer (yellow card) 88'; Chalobah (yellow card) 90+1'	Stadium: Stade Louis II; Attendance: 0 Referee: Benoît Millot

21 February 2021 26	Paris Saint-Germain	0–2	AS Monaco	Paris
21:00 CET (UTC+1)	Gueye (yellow card) 45'; Kimpembe (yellow card) 50'; Paredes (yellow card) 57'; Mbappé (yellow card) 90+3'	Report	Diop 6'; Tchouaméni (yellow card) 15'; Maripán 51'	Stadium: Parc des Princes; Attendance: 0 Referee: Ruddy Buquet

28 February 2021 27	AS Monaco	2–0	Brest	Monaco
13:00 CET (UTC+1)	Maripán (yellow card) 28'; Ben Yedder (penalty missed) 30'; Jovetić 76'; Diatta (yellow card) 85'; Volland 90'	Report		Stadium: Stade Louis II; Attendance: 0 Referee: Jérémie Pignard

3 March 2021 28	Strasbourg	1–0	AS Monaco	Strasbourg
21:00 CET (UTC+1)	Liénard (yellow card) 19'; Ajorque (yellow card) 27'; Thomasson (yellow card) 53'; Guilbert 90+1'	Report		Stadium: Stade de la Meinau; Attendance: 0 Referee: Eric Wattellier

14 March 2021 29	AS Monaco	0–0	Lille	Monaco
17:05 CET (UTC+1)	Tchouaméni (yellow card) 16'; Disasi (yellow card) 51'; Sidibé (yellow card) 82'	Report	Sanches (yellow card) 35'; André (yellow card) 83'; Luiz Araújo (yellow card) 84'	Stadium: Stade Louis II; Attendance: 0 Referee: Stéphanie Frappart

19 March 2021 30	Saint-Étienne	0–4	AS Monaco	Saint-Étienne
21:00 CET (UTC+1)	Modeste (yellow card) 90+1'	Report	Jovetić (penalty missed) 12', 13', (yellow card) 38'; Badiashile (yellow card) 44'; Tchouaméni 55'; Diop 64'; Diatta 76'	Stadium: Stade Geoffroy-Guichard; Attendance: 0 Referee: Mikael Lesage

3 April 2021 31	AS Monaco	4–0	Metz	Monaco
13:00 CEST (UTC+2)	Fàbregas 50' (pen.); Volland 52'; Ben Yedder 77', 88' (pen.)	Report	Yade (yellow card) 36'; Caillard (yellow card) 48'; Kouyaté (yellow card) 85'; Boye (yellow card) 85' (yellow-red card) 88'; Centonze (yellow card) 90'	Stadium: Stade Louis II; Attendance: 0 Referee: Johan Hamel

11 April 2021 32	AS Monaco	3–0	Dijon	Monaco
17:05 CEST (UTC+2)	Ben Yedder (penalty missed) 49', 63', 89' (pen.); Jovetić 49'; Maripán (yellow card) 67'	Report	Ecuele Manga (yellow card) 48'	Stadium: Stade Louis II; Attendance: 0 Referee: Aurélien Petit

18 April 2021 33	Bordeaux	0–3	AS Monaco	Bordeaux
17:05 CEST (UTC+2)	Lacoux (yellow card) 72' (yellow-red card) 78'; Zerkane (yellow card) 75'; Seri (yellow card) 84'	Report	Fofana (yellow card) 15'; Volland 29'; Martins 47'; Jovetić 90'	Stadium: Matmut Atlantique; Attendance: 0 Referee: François Letexier

25 April 2021 34	Angers	0–1	AS Monaco	Angers
17:05 CEST (UTC+2)	Manceau (yellow card) 45+1'; Ould Khaled (yellow card) 74'	Report	Tchouaméni (yellow card) 57'; Ben Yedder (yellow card) 74', (goal) 79'	Stadium: Stade Raymond Kopa; Attendance: 0 Referee: Hakim Ben El Hadj

2 May 2021 35	AS Monaco	2–3	Lyon	Monaco
21:00 CEST (UTC+2)	Volland 25'; Fofana (yellow card) 63'; Ben Yedder 86' (pen.); Geubbels (red card) 90+7'; Pellegri (red card) 90+7'	Report	Caqueret (yellow card) 30' (yellow-red card) 70'; Depay 57'; Kadewere (yellow card) 72'; Marcelo 77', (red card) 90+7'; Lopes (yellow card) 86'; Cherki 89'; De Sciglio (red card) 90+7'	Stadium: Stade Louis II; Attendance: 0 Referee: Clément Turpin
Note: Geubbels, Pellegri, Marcelo and De Sciglio received red cards after the final whistle.

9 May 2021 36	Reims	0–1	AS Monaco	Reims
17:05 CEST (UTC+2)	Munetsi (yellow card) 31'	Report	Matazo 20'; Badiashile (yellow card) 39'; Maripán (yellow card) 89'; Golovin (yellow card) 90+3'	Stadium: Stade Auguste-Delaune; Attendance: 0 Referee: Antony Gautier

16 May 2021 37	AS Monaco	2–1	Rennes	Monaco
21:00 CEST (UTC+2)	Ben Yedder 16'; Badiashile (yellow card) 18'; Golovin 29'; Maripán (yellow card) 31'	Report	Bourigeaud (yellow card) 61'; Disasi 67' (o.g.); Aguerd (yellow card) 70'; Da Silva (red card) 85'	Stadium: Stade Louis II; Attendance: 0 Referee: Benoît Bastien

23 May 2021 38	Lens	0–0	AS Monaco	Lens
21:00 CEST (UTC+2)	Medina (yellow card) 74'; Clauss (yellow card) 82'; Cahuzac (yellow card) 82'	Report	Volland (yellow card) 82'; Maripán (yellow card) 85'	Stadium: Stade Bollaert-Delelis; Attendance: 0 Referee: Jérémie Pignard

=== Coupe de France ===
10 February 2021 Round of 64	Grenoble	0–1	AS Monaco	Grenoble
14:45 CET (UTC+1)	Diallo (yellow card) 29'; Belmonte (yellow card) 48'	Report	Pellegri (yellow card) 11'; Jovetić 36'	Stadium: Stade des Alpes; Attendance: 0 Referee: Bastien Dechepy

8 March 2021 Round of 32	Nice	0–2	AS Monaco	Nice
21:00 CET (UTC+1)	Saliba (yellow card) 75'; Nsoki (yellow card) 86'	Report	Volland 29'; Majecki (yellow card) 62'; Aguilar 87'	Stadium: Allianz Riviera; Attendance: 0 Referee: Benoît Bastien

6 April 2021 Round of 16	AS Monaco	0–0 (5–4 p)	Metz	Monaco
18:45 CEST (UTC+2)		Report	Angban (yellow card) 65'	Stadium: Stade Louis II; Attendance: 0 Referee: Jérémie Pignard
	Penalties
	Ben Yedder (penalty scored); Volland (penalty scored); Sidibé (penalty scored); Fàbregas (penalty scored); Jovetić (penalty scored)		(penalty scored) Sarr; (penalty scored) Yade; (penalty scored) Ambrose; (penalty missed) Maïga; (penalty scored) Bronn

21 April 2021 Quarter-finals	Lyon	0–2	AS Monaco	Décines-Charpieu
21:10 CEST (UTC+2)	Diomandé (yellow card) 7' (yellow-red card) 51'; Mendes (yellow card) 9'; Paquetá (yellow card) 49'; De Sciglio (yellow card) 57'; Depay (yellow card) 68'	Report	Volland (yellow card) 1', (goal) 61'; Ben Yedder 54' (pen.); Ballo-Touré (yellow card) 56'	Stadium: Parc Olympique Lyonnais; Attendance: 0 Referee: Stéphanie Frappart

13 May 2021 Semi-finals	GFA Rumilly-Vallières	1–5	AS Monaco	Annecy
21:15 CEST (UTC+2)	Bozon (yellow card) 14'; Peuget 20'	Report	Bozon 27' (o.g.); Tchouaméni 32'; Sidibé (yellow card) 53'; Ben Yedder 55'; Fàbregas 78'; Golovin 82'	Stadium: Parc des Sports; Attendance: 0 Referee: Ruddy Buquet

19 May 2021 Final	AS Monaco	0–2	Paris Saint-Germain	Saint-Denis
21:15 CEST (UTC+2)		Report	Icardi 19'; Mbappé 81'; Marquinhos (yellow card) 86'	Stadium: Stade de France; Referee: François Letexier

== Statistics ==
=== Appearances and goals ===
No.	Pos	Nat	Player	Total		Ligue 1		Coupe de France	
No.	Pos	Nat	Player	Apps	Goals	Apps	Goals	Apps	Goals
1	GK	(Poland) POL	Radosław Majecki	7	0	1	0	6	0
2	DF	(Senegal) SEN	Fodé Ballo-Touré	29	0	6+18	0	5	0
3	DF	(Chile) CHI	Guillermo Maripán	31	5	22+6	5	3	0
4	MF	(Spain) ESP	Cesc Fàbregas	26	3	7+14	2	3+2	1
8	MF	(France) FRA	Aurélien Tchouaméni	43	3	37	2	4+2	1
9	FW	(France) FRA	Wissam Ben Yedder	41	22	32+5	20	4	2
10	FW	(Montenegro) MNE	Stevan Jovetić	33	7	6+23	6	2+2	1
11	MF	(Portugal) POR	Gelson Martins	27	3	20+3	3	2+2	0
12	MF	(Brazil) BRA	Caio Henrique	36	0	26+5	0	2+3	0
13	FW	(France) FRA	Willem Geubbels	15	1	2+12	1	0+1	0
17	MF	(Russia) RUS	Aleksandr Golovin	26	6	12+9	5	1+4	1
19	FW	(Italy) ITA	Pietro Pellegri	17	1	0+16	1	1	0
20	DF	(France) FRA	Axel Disasi	35	3	24+5	3	5+1	0
22	MF	(France) FRA	Youssouf Fofana	40	0	35	0	4+1	0
26	DF	(France) FRA	Ruben Aguilar	38	2	27+6	1	4+1	1
27	MF	(Senegal) SEN	Krépin Diatta	16	1	3+9	1	2+2	0
29	DF	(France) FRA	Djibril Sidibé	34	0	21+9	0	3+1	0
30	GK	(Italy) ITA	Vito Mannone	9	0	9	0	0	0
31	FW	(Germany) GER	Kevin Volland	40	18	34+1	16	5	2
32	DF	(France) FRA	Benoît Badiashile	39	2	32+3	2	2+2	0
33	FW	(France) FRA	Valentin Decarpentrie	1	0	0	0	0+1	0
34	DF	(France) FRA	Chrislain Matsima	11	0	3+6	0	2	0
35	MF	(Portugal) POR	Florentino Luís	11	0	2+7	0	0+2	0
36	MF	(Belgium) BEL	Eliot Matazo	14	1	3+7	1	3+1	0
37	MF	(France) FRA	Sofiane Diop	35	7	24+8	7	2+1	0
38	MF	(France) FRA	Enzo Millot	3	0	0+2	0	1	0
40	GK	(France) FRA	Benjamin Lecomte	28	0	28	0	0	0
Players away from the club on loan:
6	MF	(Ivory Coast) CIV	Jean-Eudes Aholou	2	0	0+2	0	0	0
7	MF	(Nigeria) NGR	Henry Onyekuru	4	0	2+2	0	0	0
41	DF	(France) FRA	Giulian Biancone	2	0	1+1	0	0	0
21	DF	(Serbia) SRB	Strahinja Pavlović	1	0	0+1	0	0	0
Players who left Monaco during the season:

=== Goalscorers ===
Rank	Pos.	Nat.	No.	Player	Ligue 1	Coupe de France	Total
1	FW	(France)	9	Wissam Ben Yedder	20	2	22
2	FW	(Germany)	31	Kevin Volland	16	2	18
3	MF	(France)	37	Sofiane Diop	7	0	7
3	FW	(Montenegro)	10	Stevan Jovetić	6	1	7
5	MF	(Russia)	17	Aleksandr Golovin	5	1	6
6	DF	(Chile)	3	Guillermo Maripán	5	0	5
7	DF	(France)	20	Axel Disasi	3	0	3
7	MF	(Portugal)	11	Gelson Martins	3	0	3
7	MF	(France)	8	Aurélien Tchouaméni	2	1	3
10	DF	(France)	32	Benoît Badiashile	2	0	2
10	DF	(France)	26	Ruben Aguilar	1	1	2
10	MF	(Spain)	4	Cesc Fàbregas	1	1	2
13	FW	(France)	13	Willem Geubbels	1	0	1
13	FW	(Italy)	19	Pietro Pellegri	1	0	1
13	MF	(Senegal)	27	Krépin Diatta	1	0	1
13	MF	(Belgium)	36	Eliot Matazo	1	0	1
Own goals					0	1	1
Totals					73	10	84

=== Clean sheets ===
As of match played 23 May 2021

Place	Position	Nation	Number	Name	Ligue 1	Coupe de France	Total
1	GK	(France)	40	Benjamin Lecomte	13	0	13
2	GK	(Poland)	1	Radosław Majecki	0	4	4
3	GK	(Italy)	30	Vito Mannone	2	0	2
				TOTALS	15	4	19

=== Disciplinary record ===
As of match played 23 May 2021

N	P	Nat.	Name	Ligue 1			Coupe de France			Total			Notes
N	P	Nat.	Name	Yellow card	Second yellow card	Red card	Yellow card	Second yellow card	Red card	Yellow card	Second yellow card	Red card	Notes
1	GK	(Poland)	Radosław Majecki				1			1			
2	DF	(France)	Fodé Ballo-Touré	3						3			
3	DF	(Chile)	Guillermo Maripán	7						7			
4	MF	(Spain)	Cesc Fàbregas	2						2			
8	MF	(France)	Aurélien Tchouaméni	8	1					8	1		
9	FW	(France)	Wissam Ben Yedder	3						3			
10	FW	(Montenegro)	Stevan Jovetić	1						1			
11	MF	(Portugal)	Gelson Martins	3						3			
13	MF	(France)	Willem Geubbels	3		1				3		1	
17	MF	(Russia)	Aleksandr Golovin	2						2			
19	FW	(Italy)	Pietro Pellegri	2		1	1			3		1	
20	DF	(France)	Axel Disasi	4		2				4		2	
22	MF	(France)	Youssouf Fofana	9	1					9	1		
26	DF	(France)	Ruben Aguilar	6						6			
27	MF	(Senegal)	Krépin Diatta	3						3			
29	DF	(France)	Djibril Sidibé	3			1			4			
31	FW	(Germany)	Kevin Volland	5						5			
32	DF	(France)	Benoît Badiashile	5						5			
34	DF	(France)	Chrislain Matsima	2						2			
35	MF	(Portugal)	Florentino Luís	1						1			
36	MF	(Belgium)	Eliot Matazo			1						1	
37	MF	(France)	Sofiane Diop	4						4			
40	GK	(France)	Benjamin Lecomte	1						1			
Players away on loan:
41	DF	(France)	Giulian Biancone	1						1			
Players who left Monaco during the season:

Source: Match reports in Competitive matches
Ordered by (red card) , (second yellow card) and (yellow card)
(yellow card) = Number of bookings; (second yellow card) = Number of sending offs after a second yellow card; (red card) = Number of sending offs by a direct red card.
