= Fodé Ballo-Touré =

Footballer (born 1997)

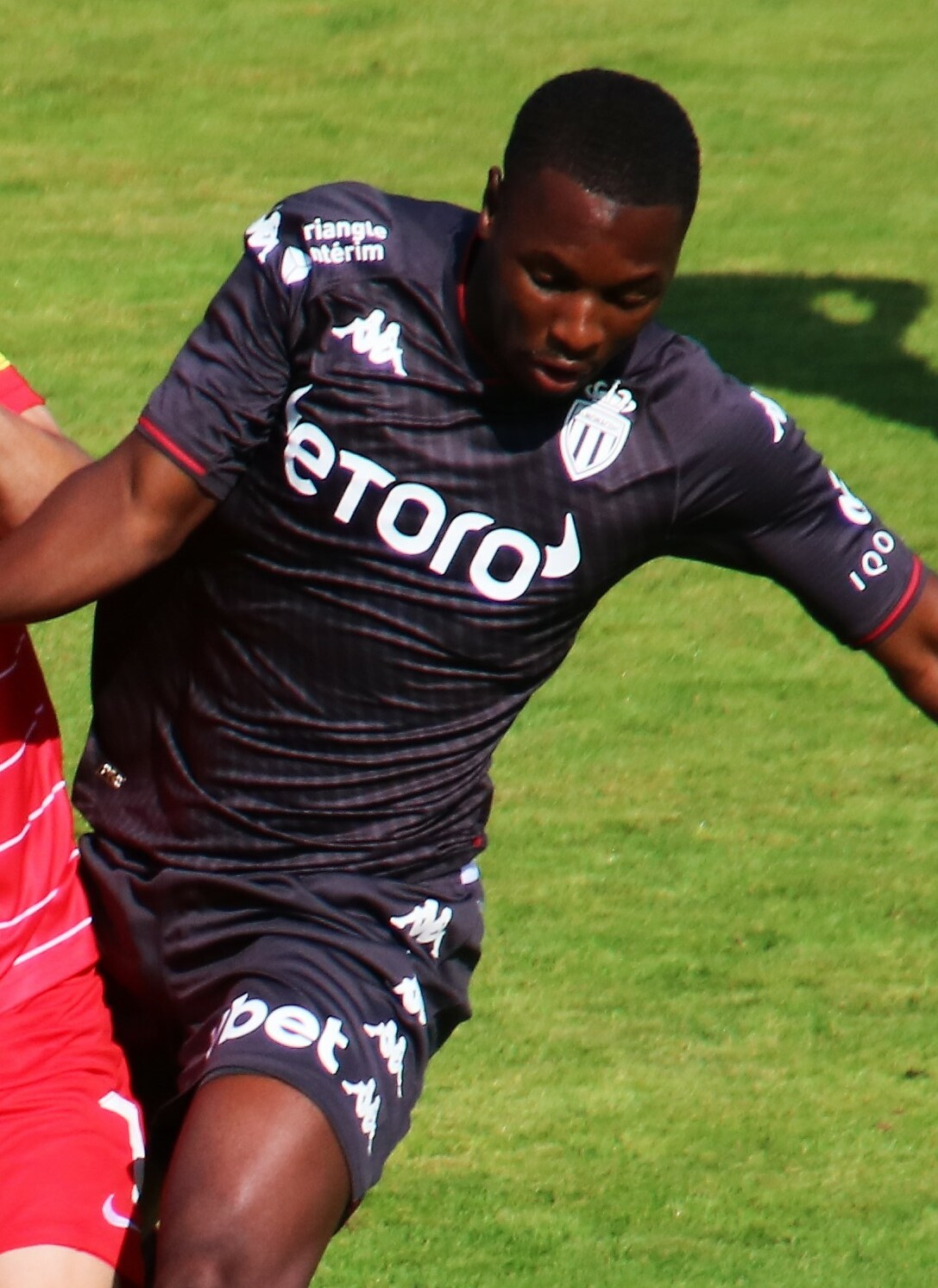
- Ballo-Touré with Monaco in 2021

Personal information
- Full name: Fodé Ballo-Touré
- Date of birth: 3 January 1997 (age 29)
- Place of birth: Conflans-Sainte-Honorine, France
- Height: 1.82 m (6 ft 0 in)
- Position: Left-back

Youth career
- 2003–2005: AS Éragny
- 2005–2017: Paris Saint-Germain

Senior career*
Years	Team	Apps	(Gls)
2014–2017	Paris Saint-Germain B	53	(1)
2017–2019	Lille	45	(0)
2019–2021	Monaco	63	(0)
2021–2025	AC Milan	20	(1)
2023–2024	→ Fulham (loan)	6	(0)
2024–2025	Milan Futuro (res.)	3	(0)
2025	Le Havre	10	(0)
2025–2026	Metz	13	(0)

International career
2012–2013	France U16	9	(0)
2018–2019	France U21	9	(0)
2021–2024	Senegal	16	(0)
Medal record
Men's football
Representing Senegal
Africa Cup of Nations
Winner	2021 Cameroon
- * Club domestic league appearances and goals as of 17 May 2026

Fodé Ballo-Touré (born 3 January 1997) is a professional footballer who plays as a left-back. Born in France, he played for the Senegal national team.

== Club career ==
=== Lille ===
Ballo-Touré developed through the Paris Saint-Germain academy. On 1 July 2017, his contract with PSG expired and he signed with Lille managed by Marcelo Bielsa. He made his Ligue 1 debut on 6 August 2017 in a 3–0 home win against Nantes. He started the match and was replaced by Rominigue Kouamé at halftime.

=== Monaco ===
On 10 January 2019, Ballo-Touré signed with Monaco.

=== AC Milan ===
On 18 July 2021, Ballo-Touré signed a contract with AC Milan until June 2025.

==== Loan to Fulham ====
On 1 September 2023, Ballo-Touré joined Premier League club Fulham on a season-long loan.

==== Return to AC Milan and Milan Futuro ====
After his loan spell in England concluded, he returned to his parent club AC Milan on 30 June 2024, although Ballo-Touré along with teammate Divock Origi initially were both left out of the first team roster for the 2024–25 season, he later joined the newly created reserve team Milan Futuro and made his debut on 20 October, as a starter for a 3–1 home loss Serie C Group B match against Legnago Salus.

On 21 January 2025, it was announced that Ballo-Touré's contract with the team was ended by mutual agreement.

=== Le Havre ===
On 23 January 2025, Ballo-Touré returned to France and signed with Ligue 1 club Le Havre, until the end of the season.

=== Metz ===
On 3 September 2025, Ballo-Touré with Ligue 1 club Metz.

== International career ==
Ballo-Touré was born in France to Malian father and Senegalese mother. He was a youth international for France. However, he decided to represent Senegal on senior level, over France and Mali. He made his debut for Senegal in a 0–0 draw against Congo on 26 March 2021.

He was part of Senegal's squad for the 2021 Africa Cup of Nations; the Lions of Teranga went on to win the tournament for the first time in their history.

Ballo-Touré was appointed a Grand Officer of the National Order of the Lion by President of Senegal Macky Sall following the nation's victory at the tournament.

He was a member of Senegal's squad for the 2022 FIFA World Cup in Qatar, making one appearance as a substitute in the 3–0 round of 16 loss to England on 4 December.

In December 2023, he was named in Senegal's squad for the postponed 2023 Africa Cup of Nations held in the Ivory Coast.

== Career statistics ==
=== Club ===
As of match played 10 April 2026

Appearances and goals by club, season and competition
Club	Season	League			National cup (Note: Includes Coupe de France)		League cup (Note: Includes Coupe de la Ligue, EFL Cup)		Europe		Total	
Club	Season	Division	Apps	Goals	Apps	Goals	Apps	Goals	Apps	Goals	Apps	Goals
Lille	2017–18	Ligue 1	27	0	1	0	1	0	—		29	0
Lille	2018–19	Ligue 1	18	0	0	0	0	0	—		18	0
Lille	Total		45	0	1	0	1	0	0	0	47	0
Monaco	2018–19	Ligue 1	18	0	2	0	0	0	—		20	0
Monaco	2019–20	Ligue 1	21	0	2	0	2	0	—		25	0
Monaco	2020–21	Ligue 1	24	0	5	0	—		—		29	0
Monaco	Total		63	0	9	0	2	0	0	0	74	0
AC Milan	2021–22	Serie A	10	0	0	0	—		2 (Note: Appearances in UEFA Champions League)	0	12	0
AC Milan	2022–23	Serie A	10	1	0	0	—		4	0	14	1
AC Milan	Total		20	1	0	0	0	0	6	0	26	1
Fulham (loan)	2023–24	Premier League	6	0	0	0	2	0	—		8	0
Milan Futuro	2024–25	Serie C	3	0	—		0	0	—		3	0
Le Havre	2024–25	Ligue 1	10	0	—		—		—		10	0
Metz	2025–26	Ligue 1	13	0	1	0	—		—		14	0
Career total			160	1	11	0	5	0	6	0	182	1

=== International ===
As of match played 23 January 2024

Appearances and goals by national team and year
National team	Year	Apps	Goals
Senegal	2021	8	0
Senegal	2022	7	0
Senegal	2024	1	0
Total		16	0

== Honours ==
AC Milan

- Serie A: 2021–22

Senegal

- Africa Cup of Nations: 2021

Individual

- Grand Officer of the National Order of the Lion: 2022
