= Lebo Mothiba =

South African soccer player (born 1996)

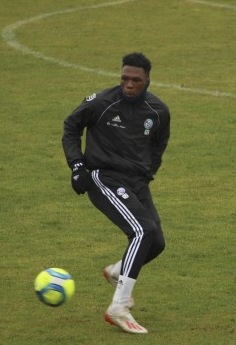
- Mothiba in 2020

Personal information
- Full name: Lebogang Mothiba
- Date of birth: 28 January 1996 (age 30)
- Place of birth: Johannesburg, South Africa
- Height: 1.82 m (6 ft 0 in)
- Position: Striker

Team information
- Current team: Mamelodi Sundowns
- Number: 35

Youth career
- 2007–2009: Mamelodi Sundowns
- 2010–2014: Diambars Academy
- 2014–2015: Lille

Senior career*
Years	Team	Apps	(Gls)
2015–2018	Lille B	32	(8)
2017–2018	Lille	17	(6)
2017–2018	→ Valenciennes (loan)	29	(10)
2018–2024	Strasbourg	88	(18)
2021–2022	Strasbourg B	2	(0)
2022	→ Troyes (loan)	13	(2)
2025–	Mamelodi Sundowns	11	(1)

International career^{‡}
2015–2016	South Africa U23	2	(3)
2016	South Africa Olympic	2	(0)
2018–	South Africa	17	(4)
- * Club domestic league appearances and goals as of 12 May 2026 ‡ National team caps and goals as of 17 October 2023

Lebogang Mothiba (born 28 January 1996) is a South African professional soccer player who plays as a striker for South African Premiership club Mamelodi Sundowns.

He made his professional debut in 2017 for Ligue 2 side Valenciennes, whilst on loan from Lille, before returning to his parent club the following year. There, he scored six goals in 17 appearances before transferring to fellow Ligue 1 side Strasbourg in August 2018 with whom he won the Coupe de la Ligue in his debut season.

Having previously represented South Africa at the 2016 Summer Olympics, Mothiba broke into the senior side in 2018 after which he became the first player to score in three consecutive matches for the nation from debut.

== Club career ==
=== Early career ===
Mothiba spent his formative years on the books of local side Mamelodi Sundowns. He never progressed to the club's first team, however, and later joined Diambars academy in South Africa from whence he was signed by French side, Lille in 2014, shortly after his eighteenth birthday.

=== Lille ===
In July 2014, Mothiba signed for Ligue 1 side Lille on a three-year contract where he joined the club's under-19 side. He spent the next two seasons with the club's youth and reserve sides before signing his first professional contract with the club, penning a three-year deal. Midway through the 2016–17 campaign he joined Ligue 2 side Valenciennes on a two-year loan deal. He scored two goals in nine appearances for the campaign which prompted Valenciennes to extend his loan for a further season. Mothiba added a further eight goals in 20 appearances for the club before his form, coupled with Lille's domestic struggles, saw his parent club recall him mid-way through his second loan stint. With Lille battling against the prospect of relegation, Mothiba returned to score five goals in 14 appearances, including a brace against Dijon on the final day of the season, to ensure that the club avoided the drop to Ligue 2. Despite his form in the season prior, however, Mothiba was forced to leave Lille during the early stages of the 2018–19 campaign after the club ran into financial difficulties.

=== Strasbourg ===
On 31 August 2018, the last day of the 2018 summer transfer window, and with Lille facing financial difficulties, Mothiba was sold to league rivals Strasbourg for a reported transfer fee of €4 million. The deal also involved a buyback option and a 50% sell-on clause for Lille. He scored his first goal for the club in his second appearance when he netted in the third minute of injury time to earn his side a point against Montpellier. On 30 March, he started in Strasbourg's penalty shoot-out win over Guingamp to help the club lift the Coupe de la Ligue title.

On 9 November 2019, on the occasion of his 50th appearance for Strasbourg, Mothiba ended a five-month goal drought with a brace in the club's 4–1 league win over Nîmes Olympique.

On 27 January 2022, Mothiba joined Troyes on loan until the end of the season.

On 31 May 2024, it was announced that Mothiba would not be extending his contract at Strasbourg.

=== Mamelodi Sundowns ===
On 3 March 2025, Mothiba joined Mamelodi Sundowns on a free transfer.

In June 2025, he was included in Mamelodi Sundowns' squad for the 2025 FIFA Club World Cup. On 21 June 2025, Mothiba scored his first goal in the FIFA Club World Cup, in a 4-3 loss against Borussia Dortmund.

== International career ==
Mothiba represented South Africa at the football competition of the 2016 Summer Olympics. In 2016, he was called up for the 2016 COSAFA Cup squad for South Africa.

In September 2017, he was called up to the South Africa senior team for the first time in the game of 2018 World Cup qualifiers against Burkina Faso on October 2, 2017, but he did not play. In March 2018, he scored on his full debut during a Four Nations Tournament draw with Angola. In October, during a 2019 Africa Cup of Nations qualification match against Seychelles, he became the first player to score in three consecutive matches for South Africa from debut. His goal also contributed towards the nation recording its largest ever victory with the match ending 6–0 in favour of South Africa.

== Career statistics ==
=== Club ===
As of 1 June 2024

Appearances and goals by club, season and competition
Club	Season	League			National cup (Note: Includes the Coupe de France)		Other		Total	
Club	Season	Division	Apps	Goals	Apps	Goals	Apps	Goals	Apps	Goals
Lille B	2014–15	CFA	9	0	—		—		9	0
Lille B	2015–16	CFA 2	13	3	—		—		13	3
Lille B	2016–17	CFA	10	5	—		—		10	5
Lille B	Total		32	8	—		—		32	8
Lille	2016–17	Ligue 1	0	0	1	0	0	0	1	0
Lille	2017–18	Ligue 1	14	5	0	0	0	0	14	5
Lille	2018–19	Ligue 1	3	1	0	0	0	0	3	1
Lille	Total		17	6	1	0	0	0	18	6
Valenciennes (loan)	2016–17	Ligue 2	9	2	0	0	0	0	9	2
Valenciennes (loan)	2017–18	Ligue 2	20	8	1	0	3 (Note: Appearances in the Coupe de la Ligue)	1	24	9
Valenciennes (loan)	Total		29	10	1	0	3	1	33	11
Strasbourg	2018–19	Ligue 1	32	9	1	0	3	2	36	11
Strasbourg	2019–20	Ligue 1	21	3	0	0	2 (Note: Appearances in the UEFA Europa League)	0	23	3
Strasbourg	2020–21	Ligue 1	0	0	0	0	—		0	0
Strasbourg	2021–22	Ligue 1	1	0	1	0	—		2	0
Strasbourg	2022–23	Ligue 1	19	3	1	0	—		20	3
Strasbourg	2023–24	Ligue 1	15	3	0	0	—		15	3
Strasbourg	Total		88	18	3	0	2	0	96	20
Strasbourg B	2021–22	National 3	1	0	—		—		1	0
Strasbourg B	2022–23	National 3	1	0	—		—		1	0
Strasbourg B	Total		2	0	—		—		2	0
Troyes (loan)	2021–22	Ligue 1	13	2	—		—		13	2
Career total			181	44	5	0	8	3	194	47

=== International ===
As of match played 17 October 2023

Appearances and goals by national team and year
National team	Year	Apps	Goals
South Africa	2018	6	4
South Africa	2019	8 (Note: The game against Ghana on 14 November 2019 is not taken into account due to the excessive amount of substitutes, which exceeded the standard set by FIFA for friendlies.)	0
South Africa	2023	3	0
Total		17	4

Scores and results list South Africa's goal tally first, score column indicates score after each Mothiba goal.

List of international goals scored by Lebo Mothiba
No.	Date	Venue	Opponent	Score	Result	Competition
1	21 March 2018	Levy Mwanawasa Stadium, Ndola, Zambia	Angola	1–1	1–1 (5–3 p)	2018 Four Nations Tournament
2	24 March 2018	Levy Mwanawasa Stadium, Ndola, Zambia	Zambia	2–0	2–0	2018 Four Nations Tournament
3	13 October 2018	FNB Stadium, Johannesburg, South Africa	Seychelles	3–0	6–0	2019 Africa Cup of Nations qualification
4	17 November 2018	FNB Stadium, Johannesburg, South Africa	Nigeria	1–1	1–1	2019 Africa Cup of Nations qualification

== Honours ==
Strasbourg

- Coupe de la Ligue: 2018–19

Mamelodi Sundowns

- South African Premiership: 2024–25
- CAF Champions League: 2025–26
- CAF Champions League runner-up: 2024–25

South Africa

- Four Nations Tournament: 2018
