= Sidi Fofana =

French footballer (born 1992)

Personal information
- Date of birth: 11 January 1992 (age 34)
- Place of birth: Boissy-Saint-Léger, France
- Height: 1.83 m (6 ft 0 in)
- Position: Center-back

Team information
- Current team: Châtellerault

Senior career*
| Years | Team | Apps | (Gls) |
| 2010–2014 | Lusitanos Saint-Maur | | |
| 2014–2019 | Créteil | 24 | (0) |
| 2016–2019 | Créteil B | 21 | (0) |
| 2019–2021 | Paris 13 Atletico | 23 | (0) |
| 2021–2022 | Lusitanos Saint-Maur | 12 | (0) |
| 2023– | Châtellerault | 14 | (0) |
- * Club domestic league appearances and goals as of 14 November 2023

Sidi Fofana (born 11 January 1992) is a French professional footballer who plays as a center-back for Championnat National 3 club Châtellerault.

== Career statistics ==
As of match played 21 May 2022

Appearances and goals by club, season and competition
| Club | Season | League | | | National Cup | | Other | | Total | |
| Club | Season | Division | Apps | Goals | Apps | Goals | Apps | Goals | Apps | Goals |
|---|---|---|---|---|---|---|---|---|---|---|
| Créteil | 2014–15 | Ligue 2 | 0 | 0 | 0 | 0 | — | | 0 | 0 |
| Créteil | 2015–16 | Ligue 2 | 2 | 0 | 0 | 0 | — | | 2 | 0 |
| Créteil | 2016–17 | National | 16 | 0 | 0 | 0 | — | | 16 | 0 |
| Créteil | 2017–18 | National | 4 | 0 | 0 | 0 | — | | 4 | 0 |
| Créteil | 2018–19 | National 2 | 2 | 0 | 2 | 0 | — | | 4 | 0 |
| Créteil | Total | | 24 | 0 | 2 | 0 | — | | 26 | 0 |
| Créteil B | 2016–17 | CFA 2 | 6 | 0 | — | | — | | 6 | 0 |
| Créteil B | 2017–18 | National 3 | 10 | 0 | — | | — | | 10 | 0 |
| Créteil B | 2018–19 | National 3 | 5 | 0 | — | | — | | 5 | 0 |
| Créteil B | Total | | 21 | 0 | — | | — | | 21 | 0 |
| Paris 13 Atletico | 2019–20 | National 2 | 15 | 0 | 0 | 0 | — | | 15 | 0 |
| Paris 13 Atletico | 2020–21 | National 2 | 8 | 0 | 0 | 0 | — | | 8 | 0 |
| Paris 13 Atletico | Total | | 23 | 0 | 0 | 0 | — | | 23 | 0 |
| Lusitanos Saint-Maur | 2021–22 | National 2 | 12 | 0 | 0 | 0 | — | | 12 | 0 |
| Career total | | | 80 | 0 | 2 | 0 | 0 | 0 | 82 | 0 |
