= Steeven Ribéry =

French footballer (born 1995)

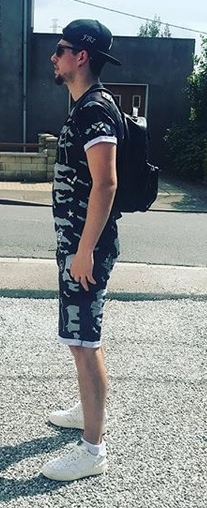
- Ribéry in 2017

Personal information
- Full name: Steeven Ribéry
- Date of birth: 7 November 1995 (age 30)
- Place of birth: Boulogne-sur-Mer, France
- Height: 1.78 m (5 ft 10 in)
- Position: Winger

Team information
- Current team: US La Charité

Youth career
- 2002–2013: RC Lens
- 2013: Stade Portellois
- 2013–2014: Bayern Munich

Senior career*
Years	Team	Apps	(Gls)
2014–2016	Bayern Munich II	50	(5)
2016–2017	Boulogne II	4	(1)
2016–2017	Boulogne	1	(0)
2017–2018	Gazélec Ajaccio	5	(0)
2019	Syrianska	5	(0)
2019–2020	FK Jelgava	6	(1)
2021–	US La Charité	0	(0)
- * Club domestic league appearances and goals as of 17 September 2021

Steeven Ribéry (born 7 November 1995) is a French footballer who plays as a winger for US La Charité.

== Professional career ==
Ribéry began his footballing career with RC Lens, as a member of their youth academy for 11 years. Unable to make a break in the senior team, he joined Stade Portellois, an amateur French team. He joined the FC Bayern Munich II squad in 2013, representing them in the Regionalliga for three seasons.

Ribéry returned to France with hometown club US Boulogne in the Championnat National, but had an unsuccessful season with contract issues and suspensions. He moved to Gazélec Ajaccio in Ligue 2 on 6 July 2017. Ribéry made his professional debut in a 0–0 Ligue 2 draw with FC Lorient on 4 August. He made four more substitute appearances before severing his contract on 11 January.

In August 2018, an agency unsuccessfully tried to sign Ribéry to the Australian A-League in hopes of attracting his brother Franck there too. The following month, he spent two weeks at Greek Football League club Apollon Larissa F.C., where Brazilian manager Marcello Troisi released him for being 12 kilograms overweight. He was on trial at Hapoel Hadera F.C. in the Israeli Premier League in November that year.

In January 2019, Ribéry signed a seven-month contract with the option of a further six at Syrianska FC of Superettan, Sweden's second tier. He made his debut on 31 March, starting in a 4–1 home loss to Degerfors IF.

After five games for the club from Södertälje, Ribéry left and it was reported by various sources that he was to sign for Mexico's Club Toluca, but this was denied by the team.

On 1 September 2019, he signed for FK Jelgava. On 10 January 2020, Ribéry was released.

== Personal life ==
Ribéry's older brother, Franck Ribéry, is a former footballer who spent most of his career with Bayern Munich.
