= Matthieu Fontaine =

French footballer (born 1987)

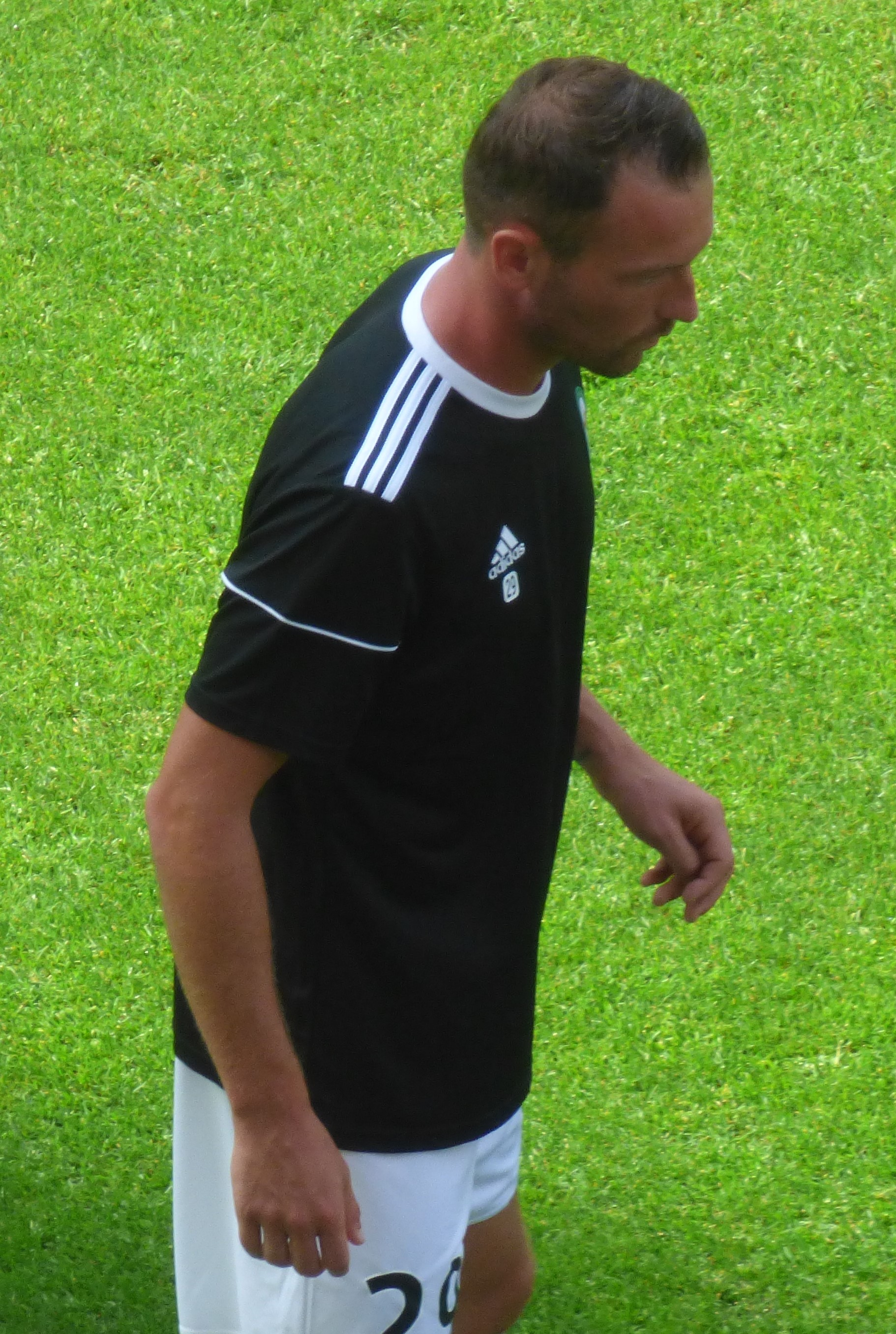
- Fontaine in 2018

Personal information
- Date of birth: 9 April 1987 (age 39)
- Place of birth: La Bassée, France
- Height: 1.86 m (6 ft 1 in)
- Position: Defender

Youth career
- 2003–2006: Lens

Senior career*
Years	Team	Apps	(Gls)
2006–2008	Lens	0	(0)
2008–2012	Reims	70	(3)
2012–2013	Rouen	32	(2)
2013–2015	Le Poiré-sur-Vie	45	(3)
2013–2015	Le Poiré-sur-Vie B	3	(0)
2015–2016	Amiens	26	(3)
2015–2017	Amiens B	20	(1)
2017–2020	Red Star	31	(2)
- * Club domestic league appearances and goals as of 12:06, 21 July 2020 (UTC)

Matthieu Fontaine (born 9 April 1987) is a French professional footballer who plays as a defender.

He played on the professional level in Ligue 2 for Stade Reims.

== Career ==
Fontaine came through the youth system at Lens, however he wasn't offered a professional contract by them. In the summer of 2008 he signed a two-year deal with Reims. He made his Ligue 2 debut for the club on 16 January 2009, against AC Ajaccio. After relegation in 2009, he experience promotion twice with Reims, to Ligue 2 in 2010 and to Ligue 1 in 2012.

In June 2012 Fontaine signed for Rouen in the Championnat National. At the end of the 2012–13 Championnat National season, Rouen were declared bankrupt, and in August 2013 Fontaine joined Poiré-sur-Vie. At the end of the 2014–15 Championnat National season, Poiré-sur-Vie forfeited their place in the division, and Fontaine left despite having a year left on his contract, signing for Amiens SC.

In June 2017, after seeing back-to-back promotions at Amiens, Fontaine left to sign for Red Star where he was immediately given the captaincy.
