= Nathaël Julan =

French footballer (1996–2020)

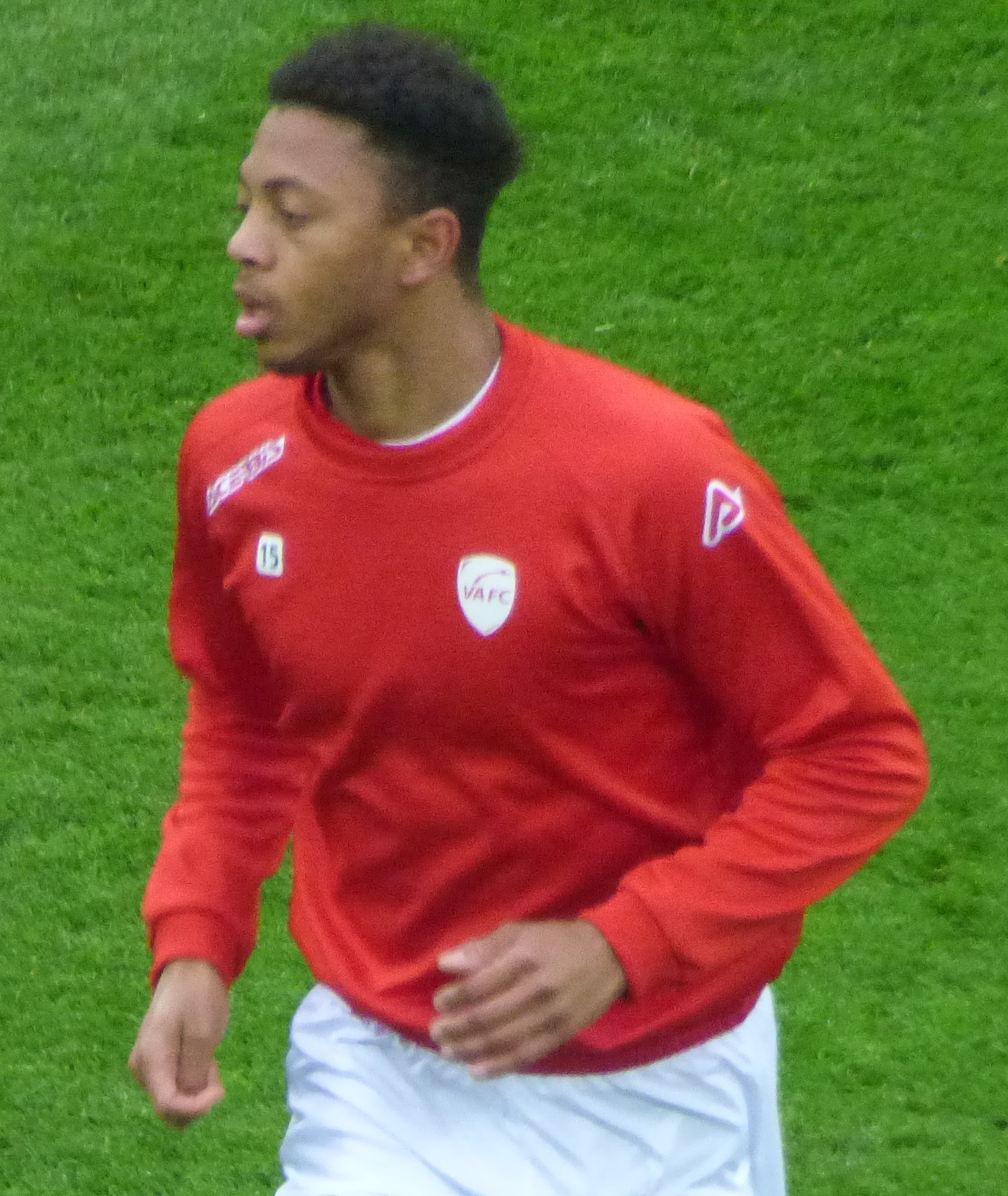
- Julan with Valenciennes in April 2019

Personal information
- Full name: Nathaël Antoine Julian Julan
- Date of birth: 19 July 1996
- Place of birth: Montivilliers, France
- Date of death: 3 January 2020 (aged 23)
- Place of death: Pordic, France
- Height: 1.96 m (6 ft 5 in)
- Position: Forward

Youth career
- 2004–2015: Le Havre

Senior career*
Years	Team	Apps	(Gls)
2014–2017	Le Havre B	52	(23)
2015–2018	Le Havre	39	(7)
2018–2020	Guingamp	11	(0)
2019	→ Valenciennes (loan)	13	(2)
2019	Guingamp II	3	(2)
Total		118	(34)
- * Club domestic league appearances and goals

Nathaël Antoine Julian Julan (19 July 1996 – 3 January 2020) was a French professional footballer who played as a forward. He represented Guingamp in Ligue 1, and Le Havre and Valenciennes in Ligue 2.

== Career ==
On 30 June 2016, Julan signed his first professional contract with Le Havre, for three years. On 4 August 2017, in the first round of the Coupe de la Ligue at home to Nîmes Olympique, he scored twice in a 4–4 draw and the winning strike in the subsequent penalty shootout.

After registering three goals and an assist in 14 games over the first half of the season, Julan joined Ligue 1 club Guingamp on a 3 1/2-year deal on 31 January 2018. On 10 January 2019, he joined Ligue 2 side Valenciennes, until the end of the season. Eight days later on his debut, he scored to open a 1–1 draw at Châteauroux.

In the last match of his life on 30 November 2019, Julan scored both goals, as Guingamp's reserves beat leaders C'Chartres 2–1 at home in the Championnat National 2.

== Personal life and death ==
Julan was born in Montivilliers, Seine-Maritime, and he was of Guadeloupean descent.

On 3 January 2020, Julan died in a car accident in his Audi Q5 in Pordic, Brittany, after leaving training.

== Honours ==
Guingamp

- Coupe de la Ligue runner-up: 2018–19
