= Jordan Pierre-Charles =

French professional footballer (born 1993)

Personal information
- Date of birth: 26 November 1993 (age 32)
- Place of birth: Levallois-Perret, France
- Height: 1.82 m (6 ft 0 in)
- Position: Left-back

Youth career
- 2006–2009: Paris Saint-Germain
- 2009–2010: L'Entente SSG
- 2010–2012: Amiens

Senior career*
Years	Team	Apps	(Gls)
2012–2014	Amiens	26	(1)
2012–2014	Amiens II	24	(1)
2014–2016	Colmar	52	(0)
2014–2015	Colmar II	12	(1)
2016–2017	Ajaccio	21	(1)
2016–2017	Ajaccio II	7	(1)
2017–2018	Valenciennes	11	(0)
2018–2019	Bourg-Péronnas	48	(11)
2019–2021	Sporting Club Lyon (Note: Sporting Club Lyon was called AS Lyon-Duchère until June 2020.)	37	(6)
2021–2022	Chambly	15	(3)
2022	Stade Briochin	7	(0)
2022	Stade Briochin II	1	(0)
- * Club domestic league appearances and goals as of 12 November 2022 ‡ National team caps and goals as of

Jordan Pierre-Charles (born 26 November 1993) is a French professional footballer who plays as a defender.

== Club career ==
After making his semi-professional debut in the French lower divisions, Pierre-Charles joined full professional team AC Ajaccio in May 2016. He made his professional debut in the following weeks, in a 0–0 Ligue 2 draw against Tours.

In June 2017, Pierre-Charles signed a two-year contract with Ligue 2 Valenciennes. Six months later, the arrival of Saliou Ciss spelled the end of his Valenciennes career, and he joined Bourg-en-Bresse on an 18-month deal. He joined AS Lyon-Duchère in July 2019, at the end of his Bourg-en-Bresse contract. Lyon-Duchère rebranded as Sporting Club Lyon in June 2020.

In June 2021, he moved to Chambly in Championnat National.

On 2 July 2022, Pierre-Charles signed with Stade Briochin.

== International career ==
Pierre-Charles was born in mainland France and is of Martiniquais descent. He was called up to the Martinique national team for 2022–23 CONCACAF Nations League matches in June 2022.
