= Thiago Mendes =

Brazilian footballer

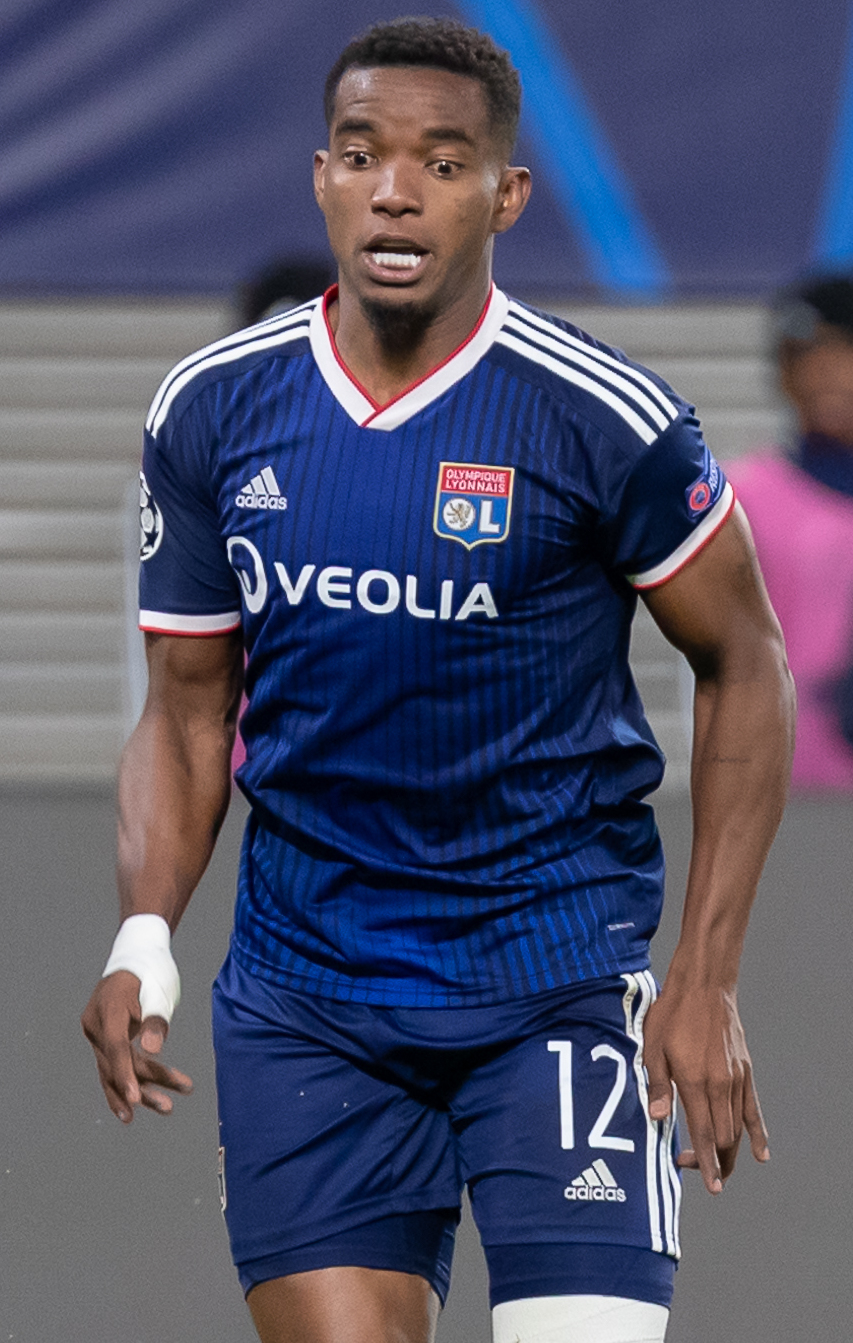
- Mendes with Lyon in 2019

Personal information
- Full name: Thiago Henrique Mendes Ribeiro
- Date of birth: 15 March 1992 (age 34)
- Place of birth: São Luís, Brazil
- Height: 1.77 m (5 ft 10 in)
- Position: Midfielder

Team information
- Current team: Vasco da Gama
- Number: 23

Youth career
- Goiás

Senior career*
Years	Team	Apps	(Gls)
2012–2014	Goiás	137	(9)
2015–2017	São Paulo	112	(8)
2017–2019	Lille	66	(3)
2019–2023	Lyon	114	(2)
2023–2025	Al-Rayyan	20	(1)
2025–	Vasco da Gama	23	(3)
- * Club domestic league appearances and goals as of 8 April 2026

Thiago Henrique Mendes Ribeiro (born 15 March 1992) is a Brazilian professional footballer who plays as a midfielder for and captains Campeonato Brasileiro Série A club Vasco da Gama.

== Career ==
=== Lille ===
On 8 July 2017, Ligue 1 side Lille announced the signing of Mendes on a five-year contract. The transfer fee was reported as "worth up to €9 million" after being signed by manager Marcelo Bielsa.

=== Lyon ===
On 3 July 2019, Mendes signed for Ligue 1 club Lyon.

=== Vasco da Gama ===
On 3 July 2025, Mendes signed for Campeonato Brasileiro Série A club Vasco da Gama until December 2027. He quickly established himself as a starter and helped organize Vasco's defensive midfield, helping them reach the 2025 Copa do Brasil finals. On 15 March 2026, Mendes captained Vasco da Gama and scored his first goal for the club in a 2–1 victory over Palmeiras.

== Career statistics ==
As of match played 7 July 2023

Appearances and goals by club, season and competition
Club	Season	League			National cup		League cup		Continental		Other^{1}		Total	
Club	Season	Division	Apps	Goals	Apps	Goals	Apps	Goals	Apps	Goals	Apps	Goals	Apps	Goals
Goiás	2012	Série B	35	1	6	0	—		—		11	2	52	3
Goiás	2013	Série A	27	1	7	0	—		—		14	1	48	2
Goiás	2014	Série A	34	3	2	0	—		4	1	16	1	56	5
Goiás	Total		96	5	15	0	—		4	1	41	4	156	10
São Paulo	2015	Série A	35	1	5	1	—		3	0	11	0	54	2
São Paulo	2016	Série A	32	2	2	0	—		14	1	14	1	62	4
São Paulo	2017	Série A	5	0	5	0	—		1	1	15	4	26	5
São Paulo	Total		72	3	12	1	—		18	2	40	5	142	11
Lille	2017–18	Ligue 1	31	3	2	1	2	0	—		—		35	4
Lille	2018–19	Ligue 1	35	0	2	0	0	0	—		—		37	0
Lille	Total		66	3	4	1	2	0	—		—		72	4
Lyon	2019–20	Ligue 1	22	0	3	0	4	0	8	0	—		37	0
Lyon	2020–21	Ligue 1	32	0	3	0	—		—		—		35	0
Lyon	2021–22	Ligue 1	29	1	0	0	—		8	0	—		37	1
Lyon	2022–23	Ligue 1	31	1	3	0	—		—		—		34	1
Lyon	Total		114	2	9	0	4	0	16	0	—		143	2
Al-Rayyan	2023-24	QSL	0	0	0	0	—		—		0	0	0	0
Al-Rayyan	Total		0	0	0	0	—		0	0	0	0	0	0
Career total			349	13	39	2	6	0	38	3	81	9	512	27

- 1.Includes Campeonato Goiano and Campeonato Paulista.

== Honours ==
Goiás

- Campeonato Goiano: 2012, 2013
- Campeonato Brasileiro Série B: 2012

São Paulo

- Florida Cup: 2017

Lyon

- Emirates Cup: 2019
- Coupe de la Ligue runner-up: 2019–20
