= Boubakary Soumaré =

French footballer (born 1999)

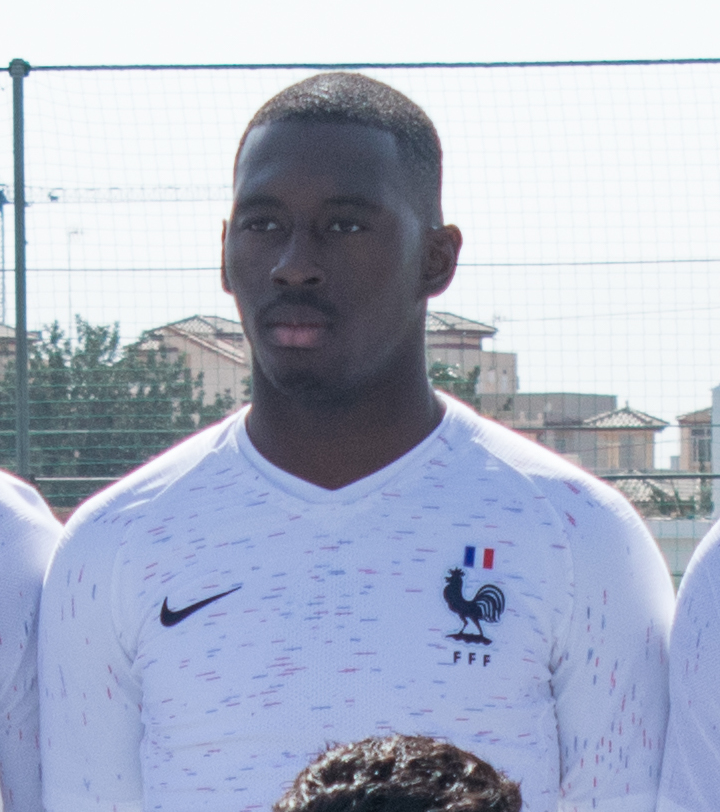
- Soumaré playing for France U20 in 2019

Personal information
- Full name: Boubakary Soumaré
- Date of birth: 27 February 1999 (age 27)
- Place of birth: Noisy-le-Sec, France
- Height: 1.88 m (6 ft 2 in)
- Position: Defensive midfielder

Team information
- Current team: Al-Duhail
- Number: 34

Youth career
- 2006–2011: Paris FC
- 2011–2017: Paris Saint-Germain

Senior career*
Years	Team	Apps	(Gls)
2017	Paris Saint-Germain B	8	(0)
2017–2019	Lille II	8	(1)
2017–2021	Lille	84	(1)
2021–2026	Leicester City	92	(0)
2023–2024	→ Sevilla (loan)	28	(0)
2026–	Al-Duhail	0	(0)

International career
2014–2015	France U16	6	(0)
2015	France U17	2	(0)
2016–2017	France U18	8	(0)
2017–2018	France U19	11	(0)
2018–2019	France U20	7	(0)
2019–2021	France U21	14	(0)
- * Club domestic league appearances and goals as of 19:34, 29 January 2026 (UTC)

Boubakary Soumaré (born 27 February 1999) is a French professional footballer who plays as a defensive midfielder for Qatar Stars League club Al-Duhail. He is a former France youth international.

== Club career ==
=== Early career ===
In his early footballing years, Soumaré was a young player at Paris FC. He stayed at the club from 2006 to 2011, before joining the Paris Saint-Germain Academy. At PSG, he was selected for eight appearances for the B team of the club in 2017, and left later that year.

=== Lille ===
On 7 July 2017, Soumaré signed for Lille on a three-year contract. His professional debut began with a 3–0 Ligue 1 win over Metz on 5 November 2017. At the end of the 2017–18 season, Lille managed to stay in the Ligue 1, meaning that Soumaré's contract was extended by two years, as his deal entailed such an option.

Soumaré's only goal for Lille occurred in a 2–2 away draw against Lyon on 5 May 2019.

=== Leicester City ===
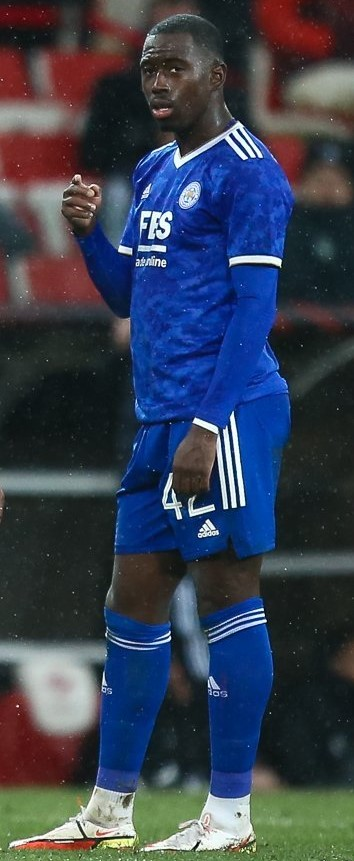
Soumaré with Leicester City in 2021

On 2 July 2021, Premier League club Leicester City signed Soumaré for an undisclosed sum on a five-year contract. He made his debut for the club with an appearance off the bench in Leicester's 1–0 triumph over reigning Premier League champions Manchester City in the FA Community Shield on 7 August 2021.

==== Loan to Sevilla ====
On 1 September 2023, Soumaré signed for Sevilla on a season-long loan. He made a positive impression on the club, however Sevilla were unable to meet the €15 million required to make the move permanent, so Soumaré returned to Leicester City at the end of the season.

=== Al-Duhail ===
After spending the first half of the 2025–26 season with Leicester City competing in the EFL Championship, on 29 January 2026 Soumaré joined Qatar Stars League club Al-Duhail for an undisclosed fee.

== International career ==
Soumaré was born in France and is of Senegalese descent. He has been a young international for France at various levels.

== Career statistics ==
As of match played 24 January 2026

Appearances and goals by club, season and competition
Club	Season	League			National cup (Note: Includes Coupe de France, FA Cup, Copa del Rey)		League cup (Note: Includes Coupe de la Ligue, EFL Cup)		Europe		Other		Total	
Club	Season	Division	Apps	Goals	Apps	Goals	Apps	Goals	Apps	Goals	Apps	Goals	Apps	Goals
Paris Saint-Germain B	2016–17	CFA	8	0	—		—		—		—		8	0
Lille II	2017–18	National 2	4	1	—		—		—		—		4	1
Lille II	2018–19	National 2	4	0	—		—		—		—		4	0
Lille II	Total		8	1	—		—		—		—		8	1
Lille	2017–18	Ligue 1	14	0	1	0	2	0	—		—		17	0
Lille	2018–19	Ligue 1	18	1	3	0	1	0	—		—		22	1
Lille	2019–20	Ligue 1	20	0	2	0	2	0	6 (Note: Appearances in UEFA Champions League)	0	—		30	0
Lille	2020–21	Ligue 1	32	0	3	0	—		8 (Note: Appearances in UEFA Europa League)	0	—		43	0
Lille	Total		84	1	9	0	5	0	14	0	—		112	1
Leicester City	2021–22	Premier League	19	0	0	0	2	0	8 (Note: Six appearances in UEFA Europa League, two appearances in UEFA Europa Conference League)	0	1 (Note: Appearance in FA Community Shield)	0	30	0
Leicester City	2022–23	Premier League	26	0	1	0	2	0	—		—		29	0
Leicester City	2024–25	Premier League	31	0	2	0	2	0	—		—		35	0
Leicester City	2025–26	Championship	16	0	0	0	1	0	—		—		17	0
Leicester City	Total		92	0	3	0	7	0	8	0	1	0	111	0
Sevilla (loan)	2023–24	La Liga	28	0	2	0	—		4	0	—		34	0
Career total			220	2	14	0	12	0	26	0	1	0	273	2

== Honours ==
Paris Saint-Germain U19

- Championnat National U19: 2015–16

Lille

- Ligue 1: 2020–21

Leicester City

- FA Community Shield: 2021
