= 2020–21 FC Girondins de Bordeaux season =

Bordeaux
2020–21 season
- President: Frédéric Longuépée
- Head coach: Paulo Sousa (until 10 August); Jean-Louis Gasset (from 10 August)
- Stadium: Matmut Atlantique
- Ligue 1: 12th
- Coupe de France: Round of 64
- Top goalscorer: League: Hwang Ui-jo (11); All: Hwang Ui-jo (11)
Home colours	Away colours
- All statistics correct as of 23 May 2021.

The 2020–21 season was the 140th season in the existence of FC Girondins de Bordeaux and the club's 59th consecutive season in the top flight of French football. In addition to the domestic league, Bordeaux participated in this season's edition of the Coupe de France. The season covered the period from 1 July 2020 to 30 June 2021.

== Players ==
=== First-team squad ===
As of 1 February 2021.

Note: Flags indicate national team as defined under FIFA eligibility rules; some limited exceptions apply. Players may hold more than one non-FIFA nationality.

No.	Pos.	Nation	Player
1	GK	FRA	Benoît Costil (vice-captain)
4	DF	MOZ	Mexer
5	MF	BRA	Otávio
6	DF	FRA	Laurent Koscielny (captain)
7	FW	FRA	Jimmy Briand
8	FW	FRA	Hatem Ben Arfa
10	FW	NGR	Samuel Kalu
12	FW	FRA	Nicolas de Préville
14	DF	SRB	Vukašin Jovanović
16	GK	FRA	Gaëtan Poussin
17	MF	ALG	Mehdi Zerkane
18	FW	KOR	Hwang Ui-jo
19	MF	FRA	Yacine Adli

No.	Pos.	Nation	Player
20	DF	SEN	Youssouf Sabaly
23	DF	SUI	Loris Benito
24	DF	FRA	Paul Baysse
25	DF	FRA	Enock Kwateng
26	MF	CRO	Toma Bašić
28	FW	FRA	Rémi Oudin
29	DF	FRA	Maxime Poundjé
30	GK	FRA	Darren Lima Semedo
31	FW	FRA	Amadou Traoré
32	FW	FRA	Dilane Bakwa
—	DF	TOG	Loïc Bessilé
15	MF	CIV	Jean Michaël Seri (on loan from Fulham)

=== On loan ===
Note: Flags indicate national team as defined under FIFA eligibility rules; some limited exceptions apply. Players may hold more than one non-FIFA nationality.

No.	Pos.	Nation	Player
—	GK	FRA	Over Mandanda (on loan at Stade Laval)
—	DF	ITA	Raoul Bellanova (on loan at Pescara)
—	DF	FRA	Alexandre Lauray (on loan at Villefranche)

No.	Pos.	Nation	Player
—	DF	ALG	Abdel Medioub (on loan at Tondela)
—	MF	ESP	Rubén Pardo (on loan at Leganés)
—	FW	NGR	Josh Maja (on loan at Fulham)

== Transfers ==
=== In ===
No.	Pos	Player	Transferred from	Fee	Date	Source
8	MF	(France) Hatem Ben Arfa	(Spain) Valladolid	Free	7 October 2020	

=== Out ===
No.	Pos	Player	Transferred to	Fee	Date	Source
17	MF	(Morocco) Youssef Aït Bennasser	Monaco	Loan return	1 July 2020	
–	GK	(France) Paul Bernardoni	(France) Angers	Undisclosed	1 July 2020	
–	MF	(Morocco) Yassine Benrahou	(France) Nîmes	€1.5m	1 July 2020	
–	FW	(Gabon) Aaron Boupendza	(Turkey) Hatayspor	Undisclosed	6 August 2020	
11	FW	(Guinea) François Kamano	(Russia) Lokomotiv Moscow	€5.5m	17 August 2020	
24	MF	(France) Albert Lottin	(Netherlands) Jong Utrecht	Undisclosed	1 September 2020	
–	FD	(France) Alexandre Lauray	(France) Villefranche	Loan	1 September 2020	
8	MF	(Spain) Rubén Pardo	(Spain) Leganés	Loan	27 September 2020	
–	FW	(France) Alexandre Mendy	(France) Caen	Undisclosed	1 October 2020	

== Pre-season and friendlies ==
Win Draw Loss Fixtures

25 July 2020 Friendly	Angers (France)	1–1	(France) Bordeaux	Cholet, France
18:00 CEST (UTC+2)	Mouaddib 90'	Report	Koscielny 73'	Stadium: Stade Omnisports Jean Bouin

1 August 2020 Friendly	Bordeaux (France)	Cancelled	(France) Nantes	La Roche-sur-Yon, France
--:-- CEST (UTC+2)				Stadium: Stade Henri Desgrange

1 August 2020 Friendly	Saint-Étienne (France)	4–2	(France) Bordeaux	Saint-Étienne, France
18:00 CEST (UTC+2)	Nordin 2'; Aouchiche 45'; Abi 47', 71'	Report	De Préville 34' (pen.); Briand 90+2'	Stadium: Stade Geoffroy-Guichard; Referee: Willy Delajod

4 August 2020 Friendly	Toulouse (France)	0–0	(France) Bordeaux	Agen, France
19:00 CEST (UTC+2)		Report	Lauray (yellow card) 38'	Stadium: Stade Armandie; Attendance: 2,800; Referee: Olivier Thual

8 August 2020 Friendly	Reims (France)	0–4	(France) Bordeaux	Reims, France
18:00 CEST (UTC+2)		Report	Oudin 28'; De Préville 30'; Zerkane 41'; Briand 67'	Stadium: Stade Auguste-Delaune; Attendance: 2,189

15 August 2020 Friendly	Auxerre (France)	Cancelled	(France) Bordeaux	Auxerre, France
19:00 CEST (UTC+2)		Report		Stadium: Stade de l'Abbé-Deschamps

== Competitions ==
=== Overall record ===
Competition	First match	Last match	Starting round	Final position	Record							
Competition	First match	Last match	Starting round	Final position	Pld	W	D	L	GF	GA	GD	Win %
Ligue 1	21 August 2020	23 May 2021	Matchday 1	12th	38	13	6	19	42	56	−14	34.21
Coupe de France	10 February 2021		Round of 64	Round of 64	1	0	0	1	0	2	−2	0.00
Total					39	13	6	20	42	58	−16	33.33

Last updated: 23 May 2021
Source: Soccerway

=== Ligue 1 ===
==== League table ====
Pos	Team	Pld	W	D	L	GF	GA	GD	Pts
10	Metz	38	12	11	15	44	48	−4	47
11	Saint-Étienne	38	12	10	16	42	54	−12	46
12	Bordeaux	38	13	6	19	42	56	−14	45
13	Angers	38	12	8	18	40	58	−18	44
14	Reims	38	9	15	14	42	50	−8	42

Source: Ligue 1
Rules for classification: 1) Points; 2) Goal difference; 3) Goals scored; 4) Head-to-head goal difference; 5) Fairplay ranking.

==== Results summary ====
Overall								Home						Away					
Pld	W	D	L	GF	GA	GD	Pts	W	D	L	GF	GA	GD	W	D	L	GF	GA	GD
38	13	6	19	42	56	−14	45	7	4	8	19	21	−2	6	2	11	23	35	−12

Last updated: 23 May 2021.
Source: Ligue 1

==== Results by round ====
Round	1	2	3	4	5	6	7	8	9	10	11	12	13	14	15	16	17	18	19	20	21	22	23	24	25	26	27	28	29	30	31	32	33	34	35	36	37	38
Ground	H	A	H	A	H	H	A	H	A	H	A	A	H	A	H	A	H	A	H	A	H	A	H	A	H	A	H	H	A	A	H	A	H	A	H	A	H	A
Result	D	W	D	L	D	W	L	W	L	L	W	D	W	L	L	W	L	D	W	W	W	L	L	L	D	L	L	L	W	L	L	L	L	L	W	L	W	W
Position	10	2	10	13	12	9	12	9	12	12	12	13	10	11	13	12	13	12	10	8	7	10	10	10	11	11	11	15	11	13	14	15	16	16	15	15	14	12

Source: Ligue 1
A = Away; H = Home; W = Win; D = Draw; L = Loss

==== Matches ====
The league fixtures were announced on 9 July 2020.

21 August 2020 1	Bordeaux	0–0	Nantes	Bordeaux
19:00 CEST (UTC+2)	Zerkane (red card) 20'; De Préville (yellow card) 59'; Otávio (yellow card) 87'	Report	Traoré (yellow card) 45'; Chirivella (yellow card) 89'; Ndilu (yellow card) 90+1'	Stadium: Matmut Atlantique; Referee: Benoît Bastien
Note: Match originally scheduled for 22 August, but brought forward instead of the postponed Marseille–Saint-Étienne match.

30 August 2020 2	Angers	0–2	Bordeaux	Angers
15:00 CEST (UTC+2)	Santamaria (yellow card) 84'	Report	Maja 25'; Bašić 27', (yellow card) 65'; Oudin (yellow card) 37'; Sabaly (yellow card) 54'	Stadium: Stade Raymond Kopa; Referee: Karim Abed

11 September 2020 3	Bordeaux	0–0	Lyon	Bordeaux
21:00 CEST (UTC+2)	Otávio (yellow card) 55'; Briand (yellow card) 80'	Report	Dembélé (yellow card) 22'; Marcelo (yellow card) 30'; Andersen (yellow card) 68'	Stadium: Matmut Atlantique; Referee: Ruddy Buquet

19 September 2020 4	Lens	2–1	Bordeaux	Lens
17:00 CEST (UTC+2)	Fortès (yellow card) 7'; Doucouré (yellow card) 21'; Medina (yellow card) 39'; Ganago 47'; Gradit (yellow card) 53'; Kakuta 59' (pen.); Jean (yellow card) 85'	Report	Otávio (yellow card) 8'; Baysse (yellow card) 18' (yellow-red card) 58'; Benito (yellow card) 76'; Kalu 90+5'; Maja (yellow card) 90+6'	Stadium: Stade Bollaert-Delelis; Referee: Benoît Millot

27 September 2020 5	Bordeaux	0–0	Nice	Bordeaux
13:00 CEST (UTC+2)	Sabaly (yellow card) 15'	Report	Gouiri (yellow card) 90+4'	Stadium: Matmut Atlantique; Referee: François Letexier

4 October 2020 6	Bordeaux	3–0	Dijon	Bordeaux
15:00 CEST (UTC+2)	Oudin 12'; Kalu 29', (yellow card) 74'; Pablo (yellow card) 71'; Bašić 89'	Report	Dina-Ebimbe (yellow card) 38'; Panzo (yellow card) 61'; Chouiar (yellow card) 76'	Stadium: Matmut Atlantique; Referee: Antony Gautier

17 October 2020 7	Marseille	3–1	Bordeaux	Marseille
21:00 CEST (UTC+2)	Thauvin 5', (penalty missed) 14'; Sakai (yellow card) 7'; Sanson (yellow card) 49'; Amavi 54'; Pablo 64' (o.g.); Ćaleta-Car (yellow card) 72'	Report	Adli (yellow card) 4'; Maja 83'	Stadium: Stade Vélodrome; Referee: Frank Schneider

25 October 2020 8	Bordeaux	2–0	Nîmes	Bordeaux
15:00 CET (UTC+1)	Otávio (yellow card) 36'; Maja (yellow card) 42'; Briand (yellow card) 69', (goal) 79' (pen.); Oudin 81'	Report	Briançon (yellow card) 46'; Miguel (yellow card) 77'; Reynet (yellow card) 80'	Stadium: Matmut Atlantique; Referee: Bastien Dechepy

1 November 2020 9	Monaco	4–0	Bordeaux	Monaco
17:00 CET (UTC+1)	Ben Yedder 28' (pen.); Martins 30'; Volland 31', 58'; Aguilar (yellow card) 41'; Fàbregas (yellow card) 90'	Report	Pablo (yellow card) 27'; Benito (yellow card) 73'	Stadium: Stade Louis II; Attendance: 0 Referee: Ruddy Buquet

7 November 2020 10	Bordeaux	0–2	Montpellier	Bordeaux
17:00 CET (UTC+1)	Kwateng (yellow card) 51'; Pablo (yellow card) 65'	Report	Ferri (yellow card) 32'; Mollet 49'; Delort 67'	Stadium: Matmut Atlantique; Attendance: 0 Referee: Antony Gautier

20 November 2020 11	Rennes	0–1	Bordeaux	Rennes
19:00 CET (UTC+1)	Tait (yellow card) 70'; Truffert (yellow card) 71'	Report	Ben Arfa 36'; Kalu (yellow card) 47'; Kwateng (yellow card) 66'	Stadium: Roazhon Park; Attendance: 0 Referee: Karim Abed

28 November 2020 12	Paris Saint-Germain	2–2	Bordeaux	Paris
21:00 CET (UTC+1)	Neymar 27' (pen.); Kean 28'; Pembele (yellow card) 90+2'	Report	Pembele 10' (o.g.); Otávio (yellow card) 26'; Adli 60'	Stadium: Parc des Princes; Attendance: 0 Referee: Jérémie Pignard

6 December 2020 13	Bordeaux	1–0	Brest	Bordeaux
15:00 CET (UTC+1)	Ben Arfa 84'	Report	Pierre-Gabriel (yellow card) 43'; Duverne (yellow card) 60'; Belkebla (yellow card) 71'	Stadium: Matmut Atlantique; Attendance: 0 Referee: Frank Schneider

13 December 2020 14	Lille	2–1	Bordeaux	Villeneuve-d'Ascq
17:00 CET (UTC+1)	Bamba 17'; Fonte 45'	Report	De Préville (yellow card) 24'; Bašić 29'; Baysse (yellow card) 88'	Stadium: Stade Pierre-Mauroy; Attendance: 0 Referee: Eric Wattellier

16 December 2020 15	Bordeaux	1–2	Saint-Étienne	Bordeaux
21:00 CET (UTC+1)	Kwateng (yellow card) 8'; Hwang 24'; Otávio (yellow card) 30'; Sabaly (yellow card) 54'	Report	Nordin 15'; Boudebouz (yellow card) 36'; Neyou 75'; Khazri (yellow card) 77'	Stadium: Matmut Atlantique; Attendance: 0 Referee: Stéphanie Frappart

20 December 2020 16	Strasbourg	0–2	Bordeaux	Strasbourg
15:00 CET (UTC+1)	Djiku (yellow card) 4'; Sissoko (yellow card) 81'	Report	Pablo (yellow card) 2', (goal) 38'; Otávio 66'	Stadium: Stade de la Meinau; Attendance: 0 Referee: Benoît Bastien

23 December 2020 17	Bordeaux	1–3	Reims	Bordeaux
19:00 CET (UTC+1)	Benito (yellow card) 41'; Bašić (yellow card) 66'; Hwang 73'; Adli (yellow card) 78'	Report	Abdelhamid 15'; Dia 18'; Berisha (yellow card) 78'; Munetsi 89'	Stadium: Matmut Atlantique; Attendance: 0 Referee: Jérôme Brisard

6 January 2021 18	Metz	0–0	Bordeaux	Metz
19:00 CET (UTC+1)	Leya Iseka (yellow card) 39'	Report	Adli (yellow card) 20'; Pablo (yellow card) 26'	Stadium: Stade Saint-Symphorien; Attendance: 0 Referee: Antony Gautier

9 January 2021 19	Bordeaux	2–1	Lorient	Bordeaux
21:00 CET (UTC+1)	Oudin 13', 43'; Hwang (yellow card) 41'; Baysse (yellow card) 90'	Report	Moffi 23'	Stadium: Matmut Atlantique; Attendance: 0 Referee: Willy Delajod

17 January 2021 20	Nice	0–3	Bordeaux	Nice
15:00 CET (UTC+1)		Report	Bašić (yellow card) 33', (goal) 87'; Hwang 50'; Baysse 75'	Stadium: Allianz Riviera; Attendance: 0 Referee: Thomas Léonard

24 January 2021 21	Bordeaux	2–1	Angers	Bordeaux
13:00 CET (UTC+1)	Hwang 8', 11'; Koscielny (yellow card) 67'	Report	Amadou (yellow card) 32'; Fulgini 39'; Boufal (yellow card) 74'	Stadium: Matmut Atlantique; Attendance: 0 Referee: Florent Batta

29 January 2021 22	Lyon	2–1	Bordeaux	Décines-Charpieu
21:00 CET (UTC+1)	Mendes (yellow card) 15'; Toko Ekambi 32'; Dubois 90+1'	Report	Kalu 55'; Benito (yellow card) 83'; Bašić (yellow card) 84'	Stadium: Parc Olympique Lyonnais; Attendance: 0 Referee: Clément Turpin

3 February 2021 23	Bordeaux	0–3	Lille	Bordeaux
19:00 CET (UTC+1)	Ben Arfa (yellow card) 63'	Report	Xeka (yellow card) 45+1'; Yazıcı 54'; Weah 66'; Sanches (yellow card) 69'; David 89'	Stadium: Matmut Atlantique; Attendance: 0 Referee: Mikael Lesage

7 February 2021 24	Brest	2–1	Bordeaux	Brest
13:00 CET (UTC+1)	Mounié 80'; Faivre 85'; Honorat (yellow card) 90+3'	Report	Ben Arfa (yellow card) 6'; Koscielny (yellow card) 48'; Bašić (yellow card) 51'; Hwang 56'	Stadium: Stade Francis-Le Blé; Attendance: 0 Referee: Eric Wattellier

14 February 2021 25	Bordeaux	0–0	Marseille	Bordeaux
21:00 CET (UTC+1)	Adli (yellow card) 65'	Report	Rongier (yellow card) 45+1'; Balerdi (red card) 55'; Benedetto (red card) 59'	Stadium: Matmut Atlantique; Attendance: 0 Referee: Jérôme Brisard

21 February 2021 26	Nîmes	2–0	Bordeaux	Nîmes
15:00 CET (UTC+1)	Meling 14'; Ripart 71'	Report	Kalu (yellow card) 49'; Adli (yellow card) 53'; Benito (red card) 68'; Zerkane (yellow card) 87'	Stadium: Stade des Costières; Attendance: 0 Referee: Willy Delajod

27 February 2021 27	Bordeaux	1–2	Metz	Bordeaux
13:00 CET (UTC+1)	Kalu 14'; Koscielny (yellow card) 54'	Report	Centonze (yellow card) 51'; Boulaya (yellow card) 57'; Delaine 72'; Vagner 90+1'	Stadium: Matmut Atlantique; Attendance: 0 Referee: Aurélien Petit

3 March 2021 28	Bordeaux	0–1	Paris Saint-Germain	Bordeaux
21:00 CET (UTC+1)	Seri (yellow card) 18'; Adli (yellow card) 49'; Oudin (yellow card) 90+1'	Report	Sarabia 20', (yellow card) 40'; Pereira (yellow card) 43'; Kurzawa (yellow card) 88'	Stadium: Matmut Atlantique; Attendance: 0 Referee: Frank Schneider

14 March 2021 29	Dijon	1–3	Bordeaux	Dijon
15:00 CET (UTC+1)	Kamara (yellow card) 30'; Muzinga (yellow card) 73'; Coulibaly (yellow card) 86'; Konaté 90'; Dina Ebimbe (yellow card) 90'; Ndong (yellow card) 90+3'	Report	Hwang 33', 45'; De Préville 50'; Bašić (yellow card) 90+3'	Stadium: Stade Gaston Gérard; Attendance: 0 Referee: Thomas Léonard

21 March 2021 30	Montpellier	3–1	Bordeaux	Montpellier
15:00 CET (UTC+1)	Sambia 35'; Laborde 58'; Mavididi 69'; Cozza (yellow card) 72'	Report	Hwang 28'; Seri (yellow card) 34'; Benito (yellow card) 90+2'	Stadium: Stade de la Mosson; Attendance: 0 Referee: Hakim Ben El Hadj

4 April 2021 31	Bordeaux	2–3	Strasbourg	Bordeaux
15:00 CEST (UTC+2)	Mexer (yellow card) 29'; Baysse 36'; Hwang 45+1' (pen.)	Report	Koné 6'; Diallo 21'; Ajorque 30' (pen.); Guilbert (yellow card) 57'	Stadium: Matmut Atlantique; Attendance: 0 Referee: Jérôme Brisard

11 April 2021 32	Saint-Étienne	4–1	Bordeaux	Saint-Étienne
15:00 CEST (UTC+2)	Neyou (yellow card) 12'; Khazri 19' (pen.), 23', 72' (pen.); Bouanga (yellow card) 45'; Moukoudi (yellow card) 66'; Youssouf 81'	Report	Hwang 9' (pen.)	Stadium: Stade Geoffroy-Guichard; Attendance: 0 Referee: Frank Schneider

18 April 2021 33	Bordeaux	0–3	Monaco	Bordeaux
17:05 CEST (UTC+2)	Lacoux (yellow card) 72' (yellow-red card) 78'; Zerkane (yellow card) 75'; Seri (yellow card) 84'	Report	Fofana (yellow card) 15'; Volland 29'; Martins 47'; Jovetić 90'	Stadium: Matmut Atlantique; Attendance: 0 Referee: François Letexier

25 April 2021 34	Lorient	4–1	Bordeaux	Lorient
15:00 CEST (UTC+2)	Lemoine (yellow card) 7'; Wissa 18'; Moffi 20', 43', 80', (yellow card) 81'	Report	Baysse (yellow card) 13'; Sabaly (yellow card) 75'; Sissokho 83', (yellow card) 87'	Stadium: Stade du Moustoir; Attendance: 0 Referee: Jérémie Pignard

2 May 2021 35	Bordeaux	1–0	Rennes	Bordeaux
13:00 CEST (UTC+2)	Mara 11'; Lacoux (yellow card) 69'; Benito (yellow card) 76'; Sissokho (yellow card) 82'; Mexer (yellow card) 90+1'	Report	Nzonzi (red card) 8'; Tait (yellow card) 74'	Stadium: Matmut Atlantique; Attendance: 0 Referee: Antony Gautier

8 May 2021 36	Nantes	3–0	Bordeaux	Nantes
13:00 CEST (UTC+2)	Coulibaly 19'; Louza 51' (pen.); Kolo Muani 70'	Report	Mexer (yellow card) 31'; Benito (yellow card) 50'; Lacoux (yellow card) 57'; De Préville (yellow card) 74'; Bašić (yellow card) 90+1'	Stadium: Stade de la Beaujoire; Attendance: 0 Referee: Benoît Millot

16 May 2021 37	Bordeaux	3–0	Lens	Bordeaux
21:00 CEST (UTC+2)	Hwang 32' (pen.); Poundjé (yellow card) 82'; Sabaly 89'; Zerkane 90+1', (yellow card) 90+1'	Report	Badé (yellow card) 56'; Kakuta (yellow card) 58'	Stadium: Matmut Atlantique; Attendance: 0 Referee: Eric Wattellier

23 May 2021 38	Reims	1–2	Bordeaux	Reims
21:00 CEST (UTC+2)	Touré 15'; Sierhuis (yellow card) 90+2'	Report	Adli 44'; Kwateng 58', (yellow card) 90+2'	Stadium: Stade Auguste-Delaune; Attendance: 0 Referee: Jérôme Brisard

=== Coupe de France ===
10 February 2021 Round of 64	Bordeaux	0–2	Toulouse	Bordeaux
14:45 CET (UTC+1)	Mara (yellow card) 30'	Report	Dewaest (yellow card) 36'; Bayo 39'; Antiste 57'	Stadium: Matmut Atlantique; Attendance: 0 Referee: Hakim Ben El Hadj

== Statistics ==
=== Goalscorers ===
As of 6 December 2020

Rank	No.	Pos	Nat	Name	Ligue 1	Coupe de France	Total
1	26	MF	(Croatia)	Toma Bašić	2	0	2
1	9	FW	(Nigeria)	Josh Maja	2	0	2
1	10	FW	(Nigeria)	Samuel Kalu	2	0	2
1	28	FW	(France)	Rémi Oudin	2	0	2
1	8	FW	(France)	Hatem Ben Arfa	2	0	2
5	19	MF	(France)	Yacine Adli	1	0	1
5	7	FW	(France)	Jimmy Briand	1	0	1
Own goal					1	0	1
Totals					13	0	13
