= 2021–22 FC Girondins de Bordeaux season =

FC Girondins de Bordeaux
2021–22 season
- Owner: Gérard López
- President: Frédéric Longuépée
- Head coach: Vladimir Petković (until 7 February); Jaroslav Plašil (caretaker, 13 February); David Guion (from 17 February)
- Stadium: Matmut Atlantique
- Ligue 1: 20th (relegated)
- Coupe de France: Round of 32
- Top goalscorer: League: Hwang Ui-jo (11); All: Hwang Ui-jo (11)
- Highest home attendance: 41,172 vs Paris Saint-Germain
- Lowest home attendance: 11,020 vs Reims
- Biggest defeat: Rennes 6–0 Bordeaux
Home colours	Away colours

The 2021–22 season was the 120th season in the existence of FC Girondins de Bordeaux and the club's 28th consecutive season in the top flight of French football. In addition to the domestic league, Bordeaux participated in this season's edition of the Coupe de France.

Bordeaux were allowed to stay in the top flight after their appeal against relegation to Ligue 2 along with Angers were accepted. Bordeaux had a disastrous campaign, finishing bottom and relegated to the second division. On 14 June, its relegation to the Championnat National (third tier) due to financial issues was confirmed. However, this decision was later overturned by the FFF executive committee.

== Players ==
=== First-team squad ===
As of 4 February 2022

Note: Flags indicate national team as defined under FIFA eligibility rules; some limited exceptions apply. Players may hold more than one non-FIFA nationality.

No.	Pos.	Nation	Player
1	GK	FRA	Benoît Costil
2	DF	NOR	Stian Rode Gregersen
3	DF	ALG	Abdeljalil Medioub
4	DF	MOZ	Mexer
5	DF	BIH	Anel Ahmedhodžić (on loan from Malmö)
6	MF	UKR	Danylo Ihnatenko (on loan from Shakhtar Donetsk)
7	FW	FRA	Jimmy Briand
8	MF	CMR	Jean Onana
10	FW	SEN	M'Baye Niang
11	FW	FRA	Sékou Mara
12	DF	POR	Ricardo Mangas (on loan from Boavista)
13	MF	BRA	Fransérgio
14	DF	GHA	Gideon Mensah (on loan from Red Bull Salzburg)
15	DF	BRA	Marcelo
16	GK	FRA	Gaëtan Poussin
17	MF	ALG	Mehdi Zerkane

No.	Pos.	Nation	Player
18	FW	KOR	Hwang Ui-jo
19	MF	FRA	Yacine Adli (on loan from Milan)
20	MF	MLI	Issouf Sissokho
21	MF	NED	Javairô Dilrosun (on loan from Hertha BSC)
22	DF	FRA	Timothée Pembélé (on loan from Paris Saint-Germain)
23	MF	FRA	Josuha Guilavogui (on loan from VfL Wolfsburg)
24	DF	FRA	Paul Baysse
25	DF	FRA	Enock Kwateng
27	MF	FRA	Tom Lacoux
28	FW	FRA	Rémi Oudin
29	FW	HON	Alberth Elis (on loan from Boavista)
30	GK	FRA	Davy Rouyard
31	FW	FRA	Amadou Traoré
32	FW	FRA	Dilane Bakwa
40	GK	FRA	Tidiane Malbec

=== On loan ===
Note: Flags indicate national team as defined under FIFA eligibility rules; some limited exceptions apply. Players may hold more than one non-FIFA nationality.

No.	Pos.	Nation	Player
—	DF	ITA	Raoul Bellanova (at Cagliari until 30 June 2022)
—	DF	CMR	Malcom Bokele (at Villefranche until 30 June 2022)
—	DF	FRA	Ismaël Sow (at Mouscron until 30 June 2022)

No.	Pos.	Nation	Player
—	MF	BRA	Otávio (at Atlético Mineiro until 30 June 2022)
—	FW	NGR	Josh Maja (at Stoke City until 30 June 2022)

== Transfers ==
=== In ===
No.	Pos	Player	Transferred from	Fee	Date	Source
22	DF	(France) Timothée Pembélé	(France) Paris Saint-Germain	Loan	10 August 2021	
21	MF	(Netherlands) Javairô Dilrosun	(Germany) Hertha BSC	Loan	31 August 2021	
15	DF	(Brazil) Marcelo	(France) Lyon	Free	28 January 2022	
23	MF	(France) Josuha Guilavogui	(Germany) VfL Wolfsburg	Loan	30 January 2022	
6	MF	(Ukraine) Danylo Ihnatenko	(Ukraine) Shakhtar Donetsk	Loan	30 January 2022	
5	DF	(Bosnia and Herzegovina) Anel Ahmedhodžić	(Sweden) Malmö FF	Loan	31 January 2022	

=== Out ===
No.	Pos	Player	Transferred to	Fee	Date	Source
8	FW	(France) Hatem Ben Arfa	Free transfer		1 July 2021	
20	DF	(Senegal) Youssouf Sabaly	(Spain) Real Betis	Free	1 July 2021	
10	MF	(Nigeria) Samuel Kalu	(England) Watford	Undisclosed	26 January 2022	
9	FW	(Nigeria) Josh Maja	(England) Stoke City	Loan	31 January 2022	

== Pre-season and friendlies ==
Win Draw Loss Fixtures

10 July 2021 Friendly	Bergerac (France)	0–1	(France) Bordeaux	Bergerac, France
18:00 CEST (UTC+2)		Report	Briand 67' (pen.)	Stadium: Stade de Campréal

16 July 2021 Challenge Emiliano Sala	Bordeaux (France)	1–1 (5–3 p)	(France) Niort	Orléans, France
19:00 CEST (UTC+2)	Briand 24'	Report	Kilama 64'	Stadium: Stade de la Source
	Penalties
	Maja (penalty scored); Mara (penalty scored); Bakwa (penalty scored); Traoré (penalty scored); Lauray (penalty scored)		(penalty scored) Vallier; (penalty missed) Renel; (penalty scored) Conté; (penalty scored) Braat

18 July 2021 Challenge Emiliano Sala	Bordeaux (France)	2–1	(France) Caen	Orléans, France
17:00 CEST (UTC+2)	Oudin 47'; Mara 84'	Report	Molchan 2'	Stadium: Stade de la Source

24 July 2021 Friendly	Lorient (France)	1–1	(France) Bordeaux	Pontivy, France
17:00 CEST (UTC+2)	Boisgard 67'	Report	Oudin 60'	Stadium: Stade Du Faubourg de Verdun

31 July 2021 Friendly	Troyes (France)	1–1	(France) Bordeaux	Troyes, France
19:00 CEST (UTC+2)	Tardieu 64'	Report	Mexer (yellow card) 59' (yellow-red card) 73'; Koscielny (yellow card) 63'; Briand 90'	Stadium: Stade de l'Aube

25 March 2022 Friendly	Bordeaux (France)	2–1	(Spain) Alavés	Bayonne, France
13:00 CET (UTC+1)	Niang 77'; Mangas 84'	Report	De la Fuente 9'	Stadium: Stade Didier Deschamps

== Competitions ==
=== Overall record ===
Competition	First match	Last match	Starting round	Final position	Record							
Competition	First match	Last match	Starting round	Final position	Pld	W	D	L	GF	GA	GD	Win %
Ligue 1	8 August 2021	21 May 2022	Matchday 1	20th	38	6	13	19	52	91	−39	15.79
Coupe de France	19 December 2021	2 January 2022	Round of 64	Round of 32	2	1	0	1	10	3	+7	50.00
Total					40	7	13	20	62	94	−32	17.50

Source: Soccerway

=== Ligue 1 ===
==== League table ====
Pos	Team	Pld	W	D	L	GF	GA	GD	Pts	Qualification or relegation
16	Lorient	38	8	12	18	35	63	−28	36	
17	Clermont	38	9	9	20	38	69	−31	36	
18	Saint-Étienne (R)	38	7	11	20	42	77	−35	32	Qualification for the relegation play-offs
19	Metz (R)	38	6	13	19	35	69	−34	31	Relegation to Ligue 2 (Note: Bordeaux were initially relegated to Ligue 2. However, on 14 June it was decided by the DNCG to relegate Bordeaux administratively to the Championnat National for financial issues. On 27 July 2022, Bordeaux won its appeal and was officially maintained in Ligue 2 for the 2022–23 season.)
20	Bordeaux (R)	38	6	13	19	52	91	−39	31	Relegation to Ligue 2

Source: Ligue 1
Rules for classification: 1) Points; 2) Goal difference; 3) Head-to-head points; 4) Head-to-head goal difference; 5) Head-to-head goals scored; 6) Head-to-head away goals scored; 7) Goals scored; 8) Away goals scored; 9) Fair-play points (Note: Head-to-head record is used only after all the matches between the teams in question have been played).
(R) Relegated

==== Results summary ====
Overall								Home						Away					
Pld	W	D	L	GF	GA	GD	Pts	W	D	L	GF	GA	GD	W	D	L	GF	GA	GD
38	6	13	19	52	91	−39	31	3	7	9	25	33	−8	3	6	10	27	58	−31

Source: Ligue 1

==== Results by round ====
Round	1	2	3	4	5	6	7	8	9	10	11	12	13	14	15	16	17	18	19	20	21	22	23	24	25	26	27	28	29	30	31	32	33	34	35	36	37	38
Ground	H	A	H	A	H	A	A	H	A	H	A	H	H	A	H	A	H	A	H	H	A	H	A	A	H	A	H	A	H	A	H	A	H	A	H	A	H	A
Result	L	D	D	L	L	W	D	D	L	D	D	W	L	D	L	L	D	W	L	L	L	W	L	L	D	D	L	L	L	D	W	L	D	L	L	L	D	W
Position	19	16	15	19	20	17	16	16	16	17	17	16	18	16	16	18	17	15	17	17	19	17	19	20	20	20	20	20	20	20	19	19	19	19	19	20	20	20

Source: Ligue 1
A = Away; H = Home; W = Win; D = Draw; L = Loss

==== Matches ====
The league fixtures were announced on 25 June 2021.

8 August 2021 1	Bordeaux	0–2	Clermont	Bordeaux
15:00 CEST (UTC+2)	Kalu (yellow card) 35'	Report	Bayo 82'; Dossou 90+2'	Stadium: Matmut Atlantique; Attendance: 18,748; Referee: Florent Batta

15 August 2021 2	Marseille	2–2	Bordeaux	Marseille
20:45 CEST (UTC+2)	Ünder 34'; Payet 43'; Balerdi (yellow card) 73', (red card) 88'; Saliba (yellow card) 90+2'	Report	Kwateng (yellow card) 30'; Pembélé 51'; Oudin 57'; Otávio (yellow card) 84'	Stadium: Stade Vélodrome; Attendance: 50,000; Referee: Ruddy Buquet

22 August 2021 3	Bordeaux	1–1	Angers	Bordeaux
15:00 CEST (UTC+2)	Mara 10'; Mangas (yellow card) 61'; Kwateng (yellow card) 74'	Report	Thomas 38'	Stadium: Matmut Atlantique; Attendance: 18,281; Referee: Pierre Gaillouste

28 August 2021 4	Nice	4–0	Bordeaux	Nice
17:00 CEST (UTC+2)	Kluivert 7'; Gouiri 33', 42' (pen.); Boudaoui (yellow card) 45+1'; Lotomba (yellow card) 68'; Thuram 85'; Lemina (yellow card) 90+1'	Report	Koscielny (yellow card) 41'; Kwateng (yellow card) 58'	Stadium: Allianz Riviera; Attendance: 0 Referee: Jérémie Pignard

12 September 2021 5	Bordeaux	2–3	Lens	Bordeaux
15:00 CEST (UTC+2)	Mangas 60'; Onana (yellow card) 78', (goal) 88'; Otávio (yellow card) 90'; Gregersen (yellow card) 90+5'	Report	Kakuta 39'; Medina 43'; Gradit (yellow card) 49'; Sotoca 90+6' (pen.), (yellow card) 90+7'	Stadium: Matmut Atlantique; Attendance: 19,763; Referee: Luis Godinho

18 September 2021 6	Saint-Étienne	1–2	Bordeaux	Saint-Étienne
21:00 CEST (UTC+2)	Hamouma (yellow card) 17'; Khazri 73'	Report	Hwang 7', 80'; Onana (yellow card) 32'; Mangas (yellow card) 56'; Dilrosun (yellow card) 64'; Costil (yellow card) 74'	Stadium: Stade Geoffroy-Guichard; Attendance: 23,869; Referee: Antony Gautier

22 September 2021 7	Montpellier	3–3	Bordeaux	Montpellier
19:00 CEST (UTC+2)	Germain 11', 50'; Mollet 71'	Report	Hwang 18'; Onana 29'; Kalu 85'; Gregersen (yellow card) 90'; Mara (yellow card) 90+3'	Stadium: Stade de la Mosson; Attendance: 9,585; Referee: Mikael Lesage

26 September 2021 8	Bordeaux	1–1	Rennes	Bordeaux
13:00 CEST (UTC+2)	Mexer 88'; Fransérgio (yellow card) 90+4'	Report	Martin (yellow card) 17'; Omari (yellow card) 36'; Laborde 56'; Meling (yellow card) 80'; Santamaria (yellow card) 80'	Stadium: Matmut Atlantique; Attendance: 16,675; Referee: Hakim Ben El Hadj

3 October 2021 9	Monaco	3–0	Bordeaux	Monaco
15:00 CEST (UTC+2)	Disasi (yellow card) 13'; Tchouaméni 35'; Golovin 48'; Ben Yedder 64' (pen.); Badiashile (yellow card) 86'	Report	Gregersen (yellow card) 86'	Stadium: Stade Louis II; Attendance: 3,667; Referee: Clément Turpin

17 October 2021 10	Bordeaux	1–1	Nantes	Bordeaux
15:00 CEST (UTC+2)	Otávio (yellow card) 57'; Hwang 62'; Koscielny (yellow card) 85'	Report	Fábio (yellow card) 42'; Pallois (yellow card) 45+1'; Moutoussamy (yellow card) 68'; Chirivella 75'	Stadium: Matmut Atlantique; Attendance: 39,510; Referee: Willy Delajod

24 October 2021 11	Lorient	1–1	Bordeaux	Lorient
15:00 CEST (UTC+2)	Abergel (yellow card) 45+1'; Boisgard (yellow card) 68'; Laporte 77', (yellow card) 79'; Soumano (yellow card) 90+3'	Report	Dilrosun (yellow card) 18'; Elis 47'; Oudin (yellow card) 72'; Onana (red card) 87'	Stadium: Stade du Moustoir; Attendance: 11,678; Referee: Thomas Léonard

31 October 2021 12	Bordeaux	3–2	Reims	Bordeaux
15:00 CET (UTC+1)	Medioub (yellow card) 53'; Fransérgio (yellow card) 54'; Adli 73', (yellow card) 81'; Briand 78', 90+5' (pen.)	Report	Ekitike 37'; Locko 63'; Faes (yellow card) 77'; Kebbal (yellow card) 84'	Stadium: Matmut Atlantique; Attendance: 11,020; Referee: Eric Wattellier

6 November 2021 13	Bordeaux	2–3	Paris Saint-Germain	Bordeaux
21:00 CET (UTC+1)	Pembélé (yellow card) 28'; Elis 79'; Niang (yellow card) 88', (goal) 90+2'	Report	Neymar 26', 43'; Mbappé 63', (yellow card) 74'	Stadium: Matmut Atlantique; Attendance: 41,172; Referee: Ruddy Buquet

21 November 2021 14	Metz	3–3	Bordeaux	Metz
15:00 CET (UTC+1)	Sarr (yellow card) 28'; De Préville 45'; Nguette 52', 71'; Bronn (yellow card) 55'; Boulaya (red card) 68'	Report	Elis 17', (yellow card) 30'; Oudin 39', 67'; Adli (yellow card) 68'	Stadium: Stade Saint-Symphorien; Attendance: 16,077; Referee: Benoît Millot

28 November 2021 15	Bordeaux	1–2	Brest	Bordeaux
15:00 CET (UTC+1)	Gregersen 43'; Pembélé (yellow card) 75'; Mexer (yellow card) 80'; Niang (yellow card) 86'	Report	Chardonnet (yellow card) 50'; Le Douaron 60', 66'	Stadium: Matmut Atlantique; Attendance: 15,280; Referee: Pierre Gaillouste

1 December 2021 16	Strasbourg	5–2	Bordeaux	Strasbourg
19:00 CET (UTC+1)	Prcić (yellow card) 14'; Thomasson 22'; Djiku (yellow card) 36'; Gameiro 43' (pen.); Ajorque 45+1', 65'; Liénard 48'	Report	Hwang 7'; Kwateng (yellow card) 18'; Gregersen (yellow card) 43'; Elis 57', (yellow card) 70'	Stadium: Stade de la Meinau; Attendance: 24,378; Referee: Willy Delajod

5 December 2021 17	Bordeaux	2–2	Lyon	Bordeaux
20:45 CET (UTC+1)	Gusto 36' (o.g.); Elis 58'	Report	Denayer 29'; Mendes 41'	Stadium: Matmut Atlantique; Attendance: 25,210; Referee: Jérôme Brisard

12 December 2021 18	Troyes	1–2	Bordeaux	Troyes
15:00 CET (UTC+1)	Chavalerin 28'; Tardieu (yellow card) 35'; El Hajjam (yellow card) 57'; Biancone (yellow card) 90+6'	Report	Salmier 30' (o.g.); Hwang 54'; Fransérgio (yellow card) 66'; Lacoux (yellow card) 86'; Briand (yellow card) 90+6'	Stadium: Stade de l'Aube; Attendance: 7,950; Referee: Romain Lissorgue

22 December 2021 19	Bordeaux	2–3	Lille	Bordeaux
21:00 CET (UTC+1)	Elis 18', 45'; Fransérgio (yellow card) 45+1'	Report	André 33'; Yılmaz (yellow card) 36', (goal) 77' (pen.); Sanches (yellow card) 37'; David 84'; Djaló (yellow card) 88'	Stadium: Matmut Atlantique; Attendance: 39,967; Referee: Mikaël Lesage

7 January 2022 20	Bordeaux	0–1	Marseille	Bordeaux
21:00 CET (UTC+1)	Sissokho (yellow card) 13'	Report	Ünder 37'; López (yellow card) 90'	Stadium: Matmut Atlantique; Attendance: 0 Referee: Eric Wattellier

16 January 2022 21	Rennes	6–0	Bordeaux	Rennes
13:00 CET (UTC+1)	Terrier 32'; Bourigeaud 43'; Meling (yellow card) 59'; Laborde 61'; Truffert 69'; Guirassy 89', 90+2'	Report	Sissokho (yellow card) 38' (yellow-red card) 50'; Lacoux (yellow card) 41'; Adli (yellow card) 50'; Oudin (yellow card) 70'	Stadium: Roazhon Park; Attendance: 4,951; Referee: Bastien Dechepy

23 January 2022 22	Bordeaux	4–3	Strasbourg	Bordeaux
15:00 CET (UTC+1)	Hwang 17', 39', 90'; Elis 21'; Lacoux (yellow card) 34'; Mexer (yellow card) 77'; Fransérgio (yellow card) 84'; Adli (yellow card) 87'	Report	Prcić (yellow card) 37'; Gameiro 43', 57'; Thomasson (yellow card) 89'; Waris 90+6'	Stadium: Matmut Atlantique; Attendance: 3,308; Referee: Mikael Lesage

6 February 2022 23	Reims	5–0	Bordeaux	Reims
15:00 CET (UTC+1)	Ekitike (penalty missed) 40', 40'; Munetsi 46', 76'; Matusiwa 59'; Faes 63'	Report	Hwang (yellow card) 39'; Ihnatenko (red card) 72'	Stadium: Stade Auguste-Delaune; Attendance: 8,858; Referee: Antony Gautier

13 February 2022 24	Lens	3–2	Bordeaux	Lens
17:05 CET (UTC+1)	Kalimuendo 10'; Kakuta 22' (pen.); Fofana 26'; Doucouré (yellow card) 45'; Sotoca (yellow card) 61'; Frankowski (yellow card) 89'	Report	Elis 33'; Hwang 53', (yellow card) 54'; Guilavogui (yellow card) 61'	Stadium: Stade Bollaert-Delelis; Attendance: 32,662; Referee: François Letexier

20 February 2022 25	Bordeaux	1–1	Monaco	Bordeaux
17:05 CET (UTC+1)	Oudin 22', (yellow card) 41'; Guilavogui (yellow card) 46'; Pembélé (yellow card) 56'	Report	Tchouaméni (yellow card) 28' (yellow-red card) 34'; Sidibé (yellow card) 34'; Marcelo 66' (o.g.); Vanderson (yellow card) 78'	Stadium: Matmut Atlantique; Attendance: 29,557; Referee: Jérémie Pignard

27 February 2022 26	Clermont	1–1	Bordeaux	Clermont-Ferrand
15:00 CEST (UTC+2)	Rashani 32'; Abdul Samed (yellow card) 48'	Report	Guilavogui 13'; Ahmedhodžić (yellow card) 44'; Marcelo (yellow card) 76'	Stadium: Stade Gabriel Montpied; Attendance: 12,032; Referee: Eric Wattellier

6 March 2022 27	Bordeaux	0–2	Troyes	Bordeaux
15:00 CET (UTC+1)	Marcelo (yellow card) 8'; Gregersen (yellow card) 45+1'; Niang (yellow card) 69'; Ahmedhodžić (yellow card) 75'; Poussin (yellow card) 87'; Oudin (yellow card) 90+3'	Report	Baldé (penalty missed) 28'; Poussin 28' (o.g.); Biancone (yellow card) 47'; Mothiba 87' (pen.); Koné (red card) 90+1'	Stadium: Matmut Atlantique; Attendance: 20,287; Referee: Ruddy Buquet

13 March 2022 28	Paris Saint-Germain	3–0	Bordeaux	Paris
13:00 CET (UTC+1)	Mbappé 24'; Paredes (yellow card) 39', (goal) 61'; Neymar 52'	Report	Guilavogui (yellow card) 40'; Oudin (yellow card) 45+1'	Stadium: Parc des Princes; Attendance: 44,000; Referee: François Letexier

20 March 2022 29	Bordeaux	0–2	Montpellier	Bordeaux
15:00 CET (UTC+1)	Mensah (yellow card) 23'; Ahmedhodžić (yellow card) 34'; Fransérgio (yellow card) 37'; Elis (penalty missed) 42'	Report	Wahi 11'; Mollet 16'; Cozza (red card) 39'; Ristić (red card) 45+5'	Stadium: Matmut Atlantique; Attendance: 15,000; Referee: Thomas Léonard

2 April 2022 30	Lille	0–0	Bordeaux	Villeneuve-d'Ascq
19:00 CEST (UTC+2)	Yılmaz (yellow card) 19'; André (yellow card) 44'	Report	Kwateng (yellow card) 21' (yellow-red card) 35'; Ihnatenko (yellow card) 84'; Poussin (yellow card) 86'	Stadium: Stade Pierre-Mauroy; Attendance: 36,351; Referee: Bastien Dechepy

10 April 2022 31	Bordeaux	3–1	Metz	Bordeaux
13:00 CEST (UTC+2)	Lacoux (yellow card) 34'; Gregersen (yellow card) 49'; Mangas 52'; Niang 68'; Hwang (yellow card) 83', (goal) 88'	Report	Lamkel Zé 21', (yellow card) 34'; Kouyaté (yellow card) 42'	Stadium: Matmut Atlantique; Attendance: 21,652; Referee: Jérémie Pignard

17 April 2022 32	Lyon	6–1	Bordeaux	Décines-Charpieu
17:05 CEST (UTC+2)	Dembélé 20', 90+2'; Toko Ekambi 27', 68'; Paquetá 34'; Faivre 46'	Report	Mara 85' (pen.)	Stadium: Groupama Stadium; Attendance: 38,713; Referee: Florent Batta

20 April 2022 33	Bordeaux	2–2	Saint-Étienne	Bordeaux
19:00 CEST (UTC+2)	Mara 16'; Onana (yellow card) 19', (goal) 23'; Ihnatenko (yellow card) 28'; Gregersen (yellow card) 52'; Ahmedhodžić (yellow card) 87'; Lacoux (yellow card) 90'	Report	Bouanga 33', (yellow card) 84'; Gourna-Douath (yellow card) 44'; Nordin 65', (yellow card) 71'; Khazri (yellow card) 84'; Camara (yellow card) 87'; Neyou (yellow card) 90+5'	Stadium: Matmut Atlantique; Attendance: 38,515; Referee: Benoît Bastien

24 April 2022 34	Nantes	5–3	Bordeaux	Nantes
15:00 CEST (UTC+2)	Coulibaly 47', 72'; Mangas 51' (o.g.); Simon 76'; Bukari 89', (yellow card) 90+1'	Report	Niang 6'; Marcelo (yellow card) 15'; Dilrosun 18'; Kwateng 68'; Briand (penalty missed) 88'	Stadium: Stade de la Beaujoire; Attendance: 23,953; Referee: Clément Turpin

1 May 2022 35	Bordeaux	0–1	Nice	Bordeaux
17:05 CEST (UTC+2)	Marcelo (yellow card) 31'	Report	Thuram (yellow card) 11'; Rosario (yellow card) 70'; Delort 74'	Stadium: Matmut Atlantique; Attendance: 23,552; Referee: Johan Hamel

8 May 2022 36	Angers	4–1	Bordeaux	Angers
15:00 CEST (UTC+2)	Cho 5'; Mendy 36'; Bahoken 63'; Fulgini (yellow card) 78'; Pereira Lage 90'	Report	Guilavogui (yellow card) 46'; Ahmedhodžić (yellow card) 56'; Mara 60', (yellow card) 60'; Dilrosun (yellow card) 77'; Adli (yellow card) 89'	Stadium: Stade Raymond Kopa; Attendance: 10,852; Referee: Benoît Millot

14 May 2022 37	Bordeaux	0–0	Lorient	Bordeaux
21:00 CEST (UTC+2)	Ihnatenko (yellow card) 24'; Fransérgio (yellow card) 70'; Mensah (red card) 86'; Ahmedhodžić (yellow card) 90'	Report	Lemoine (yellow card) 45+1'; Ouattara (yellow card) 52'; Laurienté (yellow card) 56'; Le Fée (yellow card) 90'	Stadium: Matmut Atlantique; Attendance: 23,191; Referee: Ruddy Buquet

21 May 2022 38	Brest	2–4	Bordeaux	Brest
21:00 CEST (UTC+2)	Mounié 16'; Chardonnet (yellow card) 30'; Belaïli 34'	Report	Mangas 14'; Mara 32', 73'; Dilrosun 75'	Stadium: Stade Francis-Le Blé; Attendance: 14,484; Referee: Hakim Ben El Hadj

=== Coupe de France ===
19 December 2021 Round of 64	Bordeaux	10–0	(Mayotte) AS Jumeaux de M'zouazia	Bordeaux
18:20 CET (UTC+1)	Medioub 10'; Niang 28', 45+1', 53', 65'; Pembélé 50', 62'; Briand (yellow card) 58'; Dilrosun 59'; Sissokho 70'; Maja 77'	Report	Chyti (yellow card) 18'; D. Sidi (yellow card) 40'; Bel. Kamal (yellow card) 46'; Loutoufi (yellow card) 67'	Stadium: Matmut Atlantique; Referee: Stéphanie Frappart

2 January 2022 Round of 32	Brest	3–0	Bordeaux	Brest
13:45 CET (UTC+1)	Duverne (yellow card) 28'; Mounié 36' (pen.); Faivre 81' (pen.); Le Douaron 90+4'	Report		Stadium: Stade Francis-Le Blé; Attendance: 4,039; Referee: Ruddy Buquet

== Statistics ==
=== Goalscorers ===
Position	Players	Ligue 1	Coupe de France	Total
FW	(South Korea) Hwang Ui-jo	11	0	11
FW	(Honduras) Alberth Elis	9	0	9
FW	(Senegal) M'Baye Niang	3	4	7
FW	(France) Sékou Mara	6	0	6
MF	(France) Rémi Oudin	4	0	4
FW	(Netherlands) Javairô Dilrosun	2	1	3
DF	(Portugal) Ricardo Mangas	3	0	3
MF	(Cameroon) Jean Onana	3	0	3
DF	(France) Timothée Pembélé	1	2	3
FW	(France) Jimmy Briand	2	0	2
DF	(Norway) Stian Rode Gregersen	1	0	1
MF	(France) Josuha Guilavogui	1	0	1
FW	(Nigeria) Samuel Kalu	1	0	1
FW	(Nigeria) Josh Maja	1	0	1
DF	(Mozambique) Mexer	1	0	1
DF	(France) Enock Kwateng	1	0	1
DF	(Algeria) Abdeljalil Medioub	0	1	1
MF	(Mali) Issouf Sissokho	0	1	1
