= 2019–20 FC Girondins de Bordeaux season =

Bordeaux
2019–20 season
- President: Joseph DaGrosa
- Head coach: Paulo Sousa
- Stadium: Matmut Atlantique
- Ligue 1: 12th
- Coupe de France: Round of 32
- Coupe de la Ligue: Round of 16
- Top goalscorer: League: Jimmy Briand (7); All: Jimmy Briand; Josh Maja; Nicolas de Préville (8 each)
- Biggest win: Bordeaux 6–0 Nimes; 3 December
- Biggest defeat: Lille 3–0 Bordeaux; 26 October
Home colours	Away colours	Third colours

The 2019–20 season was Football Club des Girondins de Bordeaux's 76th season in existence and the club's 16th consecutive season in the top flight of French football. In addition to the domestic league, Bordeaux participated in this season's editions of the Coupe de France, and the Coupe de la Ligue. The season covered the period from 1 July 2019 to 30 June 2020.

== Players ==
=== Current squad ===
As of 1 February 2020.

Note: Flags indicate national team as defined under FIFA eligibility rules; some limited exceptions apply. Players may hold more than one non-FIFA nationality.

No.	Pos.	Nation	Player
1	GK	FRA	Benoît Costil (captain)
3	DF	BRA	Pablo
4	DF	MOZ	Mexer
5	MF	BRA	Otávio
6	DF	FRA	Laurent Koscielny
7	FW	FRA	Jimmy Briand
8	MF	ESP	Rubén Pardo
9	FW	NGR	Josh Maja
10	FW	NGR	Samuel Kalu
11	FW	GUI	François Kamano
12	FW	FRA	Nicolas de Préville
14	DF	SRB	Vukašin Jovanović
16	GK	FRA	Gaëtan Poussin
17	MF	MAR	Youssef Aït Bennasser (on loan from Monaco)
18	FW	KOR	Hwang Ui-jo

No.	Pos.	Nation	Player
19	MF	FRA	Yacine Adli
20	DF	SEN	Youssouf Sabaly
23	DF	SUI	Loris Benito
24	MF	FRA	Albert Lottin
25	DF	FRA	Enock Kwateng
26	MF	CRO	Toma Bašić
28	FW	FRA	Rémi Oudin
29	DF	FRA	Maxime Poundjé
30	GK	FRA	Davy Rouyard
34	DF	MAC	David Cardoso
44	DF	FRA	Paul Baysse
—	DF	ALG	Naoufel Khacef

=== On loan ===
Note: Flags indicate national team as defined under FIFA eligibility rules; some limited exceptions apply. Players may hold more than one non-FIFA nationality.

No.	Pos.	Nation	Player
—	GK	FRA	Paul Bernardoni (on loan at Nîmes)
—	GK	FRA	Over Mandanda (on loan at Créteil)
—	DF	FRA	Alexandre Lauray (on loan at Dunkerque)
—	DF	ITA	Raoul Bellanova (on loan at Atalanta)
—	MF	MAR	Yassine Benrahou (on loan at Nîmes)

No.	Pos.	Nation	Player
—	FW	GAB	Aaron Boupendza (on loan at Feirense)
—	FW	FRA	Ibrahim Diarra (on loan at Créteil)
—	FW	FRA	Alexandre Mendy (on loan at Brest)
—	FW	FRA	Michaël Nilor (on loan at Avranches)

=== Reserve squad ===
As of 18 January 2020

Note: Flags indicate national team as defined under FIFA eligibility rules; some limited exceptions apply. Players may hold more than one non-FIFA nationality.

No.	Pos.	Nation	Player
—	GK	FRA	Tidiane Malbec
—	GK	BEL	Corentin Michel
—	DF	FRA	Loïc Bessilé
—	DF	ALG	Aïssa Boudechicha
—	DF	FRA	Marly Rampont
36	DF	ISR	Eyal Golasa
—	DF	FRA	Thomas Carrique
—	DF	FRA	Karamba Keita
—	MF	FRA	Logan Delaurier
—	MF	FRA	Emeric Depussay
—	MF	MAR	Yanis Hamoudi
—	MF	FRA	Brendan Lebas

No.	Pos.	Nation	Player
—	MF	FRA	Johab Pascal
54	MF	ISR	Ethan Tiby
—	MF	FRA	Abdoulaye Bomou
—	MF	FRA	Koren Kerkour
—	FW	FRA	Daouda Diallo
—	FW	GHA	Jamal Haruna
—	FW	BEL	Gabriel Lemoine
—	FW	FRA	Sekou Mara
—	FW	FRA	Sie Malama Ouattara
—	FW	FRA	Manuel Semedo
—	FW	FRA	Amadou Traore

== Pre-season and friendlies ==
Win Draw Loss

10 July 2019 Friendly	Bordeaux (France)	1–2	(Serbia) Partizan	Völkermarkt, Austria
18:00 CEST (UTC+2)	Briand 83'		Sadiq 41'; Smiljanić 77'	Stadium: Lilienberg Arena; Attendance: 200; Referee: Christian-Petru Ciochirca (Austria)

13 July 2019 Friendly	Wolfsberger AC (Austria)	3–1	(France) Bordeaux	Wolfsberg, Austria
21:00 CEST (UTC+2)		Report		Stadium: Lavanttal-Arena

19 July 2019 Friendly	Marseille (France)	2–1	(France) Bordeaux	Washington, D.C., United States
21:00 EDT (UTC−4)				Stadium: Audi Field

21 July 2019 Friendly	Montpellier (France)	1–2	(France) Bordeaux	Washington, D.C., United States
20:00 EDT (UTC−4)	Savanier 45+1' (pen.)	Report	De Préville 7', 54'	Stadium: Audi Field

28 July 2019 Friendly	Bordeaux (France)	1–3	(Turkey) Galatasaray	Innsbruck, Austria
16:30 CEST (UTC+2)	Kalu 74'	Report	Babel 7'; Babacan 45'; Büyük 67'; Donk (yellow card) 84'	Stadium: Tivoli-Neu; Referee: Stefan Ebner (Austria)

4 August 2019 Friendly	Bordeaux (France)	2–3	(Italy) Genoa	Bordeaux, France
20:00 CEST (UTC+2)	Hwang 36'; De Préville 58'	Report	Pinamonti 23'; Kouamé 34'; Hiljemark 81'	Stadium: Matmut Atlantique

== Competitions ==
Win Draw Loss

=== Overview ===
Competition	First match	Last match	Starting round	Final position	Record							
Competition	First match	Last match	Starting round	Final position	Pld	W	D	L	GF	GA	GD	Win %
Ligue 1	10 August 2019	8 March 2020	Matchday 1	12th	28	9	10	9	40	34	+6	32.14
Coupe de France	3 January 2020	16 January 2020	Round of 64	Round of 32	2	1	0	1	4	3	+1	50.00
Coupe de la Ligue	29 October 2019	18 December 2019	Round of 32	Round of 16	2	1	0	1	2	2	+0	50.00
Total					32	11	10	11	46	39	+7	34.38

Source: Soccerway

=== Ligue 1 ===
==== League table ====
Pos	Team	Pld	W	D	L	GF	GA	GD	Pts	PPG
10	Strasbourg	27	11	5	11	32	32	0	38	1.41
11	Angers	28	11	6	11	28	33	−5	39	1.39
12	Bordeaux	28	9	10	9	40	34	+6	37 (Note: Bordeaux finished ahead of Nantes on head-to-head points: Bordeaux 2–0 Nantes, Nantes 0–1 Bordeaux.)	1.32
13	Nantes	28	11	4	13	28	31	−3	37	1.32
14	Brest	28	8	10	10	34	37	−3	34	1.21

Source: Ligue 1
Rules for classification: 1) Points per game; 2) Head-to-head points; 3) Head-to-head goal difference; 4) Goal difference; 5) Goals scored; 6) Fairplay ranking.

==== Results summary ====
Overall								Home						Away					
Pld	W	D	L	GF	GA	GD	Pts	W	D	L	GF	GA	GD	W	D	L	GF	GA	GD
28	9	10	9	40	34	+6	37	4	5	4	19	12	+7	5	5	5	21	22	−1

Source: Ligue 1

==== Results by round ====
Round	1	2	3	4	5	6	7	8	9	10	11	12	13	14	15	16	17	18	19	20	21	22	23	24	25	26	27	28	29	30	31	32	33	34	35	36	37	38
Ground	A	H	A	A	H	H	A	H	A	H	A	H	A	H	A	H	A	H	A	H	H	A	H	A	A	H	A	H	A	H	A	H	A	H	A	H	A	H
Result	L	D	W	D	W	D	W	L	W	L	L	W	D	W	D	W	L	L	L	L	W	D	D	W	D	L	D	D	C	C	C	C	C	C	C	C	C	C
Position	17	16	9	11	9	8	5	7	4	6	8	6	7	4	5	3	5	7	13	13	10	10	12	8	10	12	12	12	12	12	12	12	12	12	12	12	12	12

Source: Ligue 1
A = Away; H = Home; W = Win; D = Draw; L = Loss; C = Cancelled

==== Matches ====
The Ligue 1 schedule was announced on 14 June 2019. The Ligue 1 matches were suspended by the LFP on 13 March 2020 due to COVID-19 until further notices. On 28 April 2020, it was announced that Ligue 1 and Ligue 2 campaigns would not resume, after the country banned all sporting events until September. On 30 April, The LFP ended officially the 2019–20 season.

10 August 2019 1	Angers	3–1	Bordeaux	Angers
20:00 CEST (UTC+2)	Thomas (yellow card) 3'; Reine-Adélaïde 27'; Pereira Lage 33'; Mangani 45'; Capelle (yellow card) 76'	Report	De Préville 4'; Benito (yellow card) 89'	Stadium: Stade Raymond Kopa; Attendance: 9,001; Referee: Hakim Ben El Hadj

17 August 2019 2	Bordeaux	1–1	Montpellier	Bordeaux
20:00 CEST (UTC+2)	Kalu (yellow card) 68'; Maja 70'; Koscielny (yellow card) 85'	Report	Delort 22'; Congré (yellow card) 76'	Stadium: Matmut Atlantique; Attendance: 30,192; Referee: Frank Schneider

24 August 2019 3	Dijon	0–2	Bordeaux	Dijon
20:00 CEST (UTC+2)		Report	Hwang 11'; Benito 47'; Kwateng (yellow card) 69'; Costil (yellow card) 90+2'	Stadium: Stade Gaston Gérard; Attendance: 12,471; Referee: François Letexier

31 August 2019 4	Lyon	1–1	Bordeaux	Décines-Charpieu
17:30 CEST (UTC+2)	Reine-Adélaïde (yellow card) 13'; T. Mendes (yellow card) 30' (yellow-red card) 62'; Depay 32'; Andersen (yellow card) 75'	Report	Hwang (yellow card) 15'; Kalu (yellow card) 40'; Briand 67'; Otávio (yellow card) 69'	Stadium: Groupama Stadium; Attendance: 52,327; Referee: Antony Gautier

14 September 2019 5	Bordeaux	2–0	Metz	Bordeaux
20:00 CEST (UTC+2)	Briand 7'; De Préville 9', (yellow card) 59'; Kamano (yellow card) 67'	Report	N'Doram (yellow card) 60'; Maïga (yellow card) 82'	Stadium: Matmut Atlantique; Attendance: 14,352; Referee: Mikael Lesage

21 September 2019 6	Bordeaux	2–2	Brest	Bordeaux
20:00 CEST (UTC+2)	Briand 7'; Jovanović (yellow card) 41'; Adli (yellow card) 46'; Pablo 70'; Otávio (yellow card) 71'; Mexer (yellow card) 84'	Report	Grandsir 20'; Castelletto (yellow card) 23'; Belkebla (yellow card) 37'; Autret 45'; Bain (yellow card) 61'	Stadium: Matmut Atlantique; Attendance: 15,213; Referee: Benoît Millot

25 September 2019 7	Amiens	1–3	Bordeaux	Amiens
19:00 CEST (UTC+2)	Mendoza 3'; Dibassy (yellow card) 11'; Calabresi (yellow card) 45'	Report	Adli 9', 45+1'; Kwateng (yellow card) 25'; Tchouaméni (yellow card) 31'; Kalu 73'	Stadium: Stade de la Licorne; Attendance: 11,367; Referee: Willy Delajod

28 September 2019 8	Bordeaux	0–1	Paris Saint-Germain	Bordeaux
17:30 CEST (UTC+2)		Report	Marquinhos (yellow card) 30'; Neymar 70'; Di María (yellow card) 72'; Verratti (yellow card) 90+2'	Stadium: Matmut Atlantique; Attendance: 39,215; Referee: Jérôme Brisard

5 October 2019 9	Toulouse	1–3	Bordeaux	Toulouse
20:00 CEST (UTC+2)	Vainqueur (yellow card) 51'; Sylla (yellow card) 56'; Koulouris 61'; Moreira (yellow card) 66'; Isimat-Mirin (yellow card) 85'	Report	De Préville 1'; Pablo 19', (yellow card) 82'; Benito (yellow card) 36'; Hwang 53'	Stadium: Stadium de Toulouse; Attendance: 20,084; Referee: Benoît Bastien

20 October 2019 10	Bordeaux	0–1	Saint-Étienne	Bordeaux
15:00 CEST (UTC+2)		Report	Perrin (yellow card) 19'; Fofana (yellow card) 28'; Khazri (yellow card) 32'; Bouanga 90+3' (pen.)	Stadium: Matmut Atlantique; Attendance: 25,952; Referee: Ruddy Buquet

26 October 2019 11	Lille	3–0	Bordeaux	Villeneuve-d'Ascq
17:30 CEST (UTC+2)	André 22'; Yazıcı 62' (pen.); Rémy 90+1'	Report	Aït Bennasser (yellow card) 15'; Koscielny (yellow card) 59'	Stadium: Stade Pierre-Mauroy; Attendance: 35,925; Referee: Willy Delajod

3 November 2019 12	Bordeaux	2–0	Nantes	Bordeaux
15:00 CET (UTC+1)	Tchouaméni (yellow card) 6'; Kamano 37'; Mexer (yellow card) 56'; Hwang 57'; De Préville (yellow card) 68'; Jovanović (yellow card) 84'	Report	Pallois (yellow card) 8'; Touré (yellow card) 23'; Girotto (yellow card) 72'	Stadium: Matmut Atlantique; Attendance: 19,545; Referee: François Letexier

8 November 2019 13	Nice	1–1	Bordeaux	Nice
20:45 CET (UTC+1)	Lees-Melou (yellow card) 8', (goal) 27'; Dante (yellow card) 56'	Report	Jovanović (yellow card) 22'; Briand 49' (pen.); Mexer (yellow card) 73'	Stadium: Allianz Riviera; Attendance: 16,173; Referee: Johan Hamel

24 November 2019 14	Bordeaux	2–1	Monaco	Bordeaux
15:00 CET (UTC+1)	Tchouaméni (yellow card) 7'; Benito (yellow card) 23'; Bašić (yellow card) 28'; Pablo 29'; De Préville 69' (pen.)	Report	Slimani 15', (yellow card) 54' (yellow-red card) 67'; Bakayoko (yellow card) 37'; Dias (yellow card) 58'; Henrichs (yellow card) 65'	Stadium: Matmut Atlantique; Attendance: 34,554; Referee: Benoît Millot

30 November 2019 15	Reims	1–1	Bordeaux	Reims
20:00 CET (UTC+1)	Romao (yellow card) 69' (yellow-red card) 73'; Dia 90+3'	Report	Mexer (yellow card) 6'; Maja 27'	Stadium: Stade Auguste Delaune; Attendance: 12,949; Referee: Jérôme Brisard

3 December 2019 16	Bordeaux	6–0	Nîmes	Bordeaux
19:00 (Note: The Bordeaux v Nîmes was interrupted for 25 minutes because of the presence of supporters at the edge of the field.) CET (UTC+1)	Maja 25', 38', 53'; De Préville 58'; Jovanović (yellow card) 64'; Adli (yellow card) 66'; Otávio 77', 87'	Report	Alakouch (yellow card) 44'	Stadium: Matmut Atlantique; Attendance: 12,419; Referee: Clément Turpin

8 December 2019 17	Marseille	3–1	Bordeaux	Marseille
21:00 CET (UTC+1)	Amavi (yellow card) 28', (goal) 48'; Ćaleta-Car (yellow card) 45'; Sanson 60'; Tchouaméni 90+2' (o.g.)	Report	Adli 31', (yellow card) 45+3'	Stadium: Stade Vélodrome; Attendance: 52,079; Referee: Mikael Lesage

15 December 2019 18	Bordeaux	0–1	Strasbourg	Bordeaux
15:00 CET (UTC+1)	Briand (yellow card) 63'; Mexer (yellow card) 69'; Otávio (yellow card) 82'	Report	Ajorque 11'; Thomasson (yellow card) 42'; Djiku (yellow card) 48'	Stadium: Matmut Atlantique; Attendance: 18,710; Referee: Florent Batta

21 December 2019 19	Rennes	1–0	Bordeaux	Rennes
20:45 CET (UTC+1)	Niang 82'	Report	Bašić (yellow card) 32'; Benito (yellow card) 47'; Otávio (yellow card) 74'	Stadium: Roazhon Park; Attendance: 26,403; Referee: Thomas Leonard

11 January 2020 20	Bordeaux	1–2	Lyon	Bordeaux
17:30 CET (UTC+1)	Briand 15'; Poussin (yellow card) 89'	Report	Rafael (yellow card) 24'; Traoré (yellow card) 45+2'; Cornet 50'; Dembélé 53'; Lopes (yellow card) 90'	Stadium: Matmut Atlantique; Attendance: 28,737; Referee: Clément Turpin

26 January 2020 21	Nantes	0–1	Bordeaux	Nantes
17:00 CET (UTC+1)	Girotto (yellow card) 17' (yellow-red card) 54'; Abeid (yellow card) 31'	Report	De Préville (yellow card) 26'; Otávio (yellow card) 60'; Briand 86'	Stadium: Stade de la Beaujoire; Attendance: 29,839; Referee: Karim Abed

2 February 2020 22	Bordeaux	0–0	Marseille	Bordeaux
21:00 CET (UTC+1)	Otávio (yellow card) 36'; Pablo (yellow card) 39'	Report	Ćaleta-Car (yellow card) 6'; Kamara (yellow card) 81'	Stadium: Matmut Atlantique; Attendance: 36,196; Referee: Ruddy Buquet

5 February 2020 23	Brest	1–1	Bordeaux	Brest
19:00 CET (UTC+1)	Castelletto (red card) 68'; Baal (yellow card) 72'; Cardona (yellow card) 78'; Benito 80' (o.g.)	Report	Hwang 10'	Stadium: Stade Francis-Le Blé; Attendance: 13,034; Referee: Willy Delajod

8 February 2020 24	Metz	1–2	Bordeaux	Metz
20:00 CET (UTC+1)	Niane 2'; Pajot (red card) 8'; Maïga (yellow card) 39'; Oukidja (yellow card) 80'	Report	Hwang (yellow card) 41'; Bašić 51'; De Préville (yellow card) 62'; Oudin 84'	Stadium: Stade Saint-Symphorien; Attendance: 15,054; Referee: François Letexier

15 February 2020 25	Bordeaux	2–2	Dijon	Bordeaux
20:00 CET (UTC+1)	Hwang 35'; Benito (yellow card) 38'; Briand 64'	Report	Ndong (yellow card) 10'; Chouiar 16', 72'	Stadium: Matmut Atlantique; Attendance: 13,701; Referee: Mikael Lesage

23 February 2020 26	Paris Saint-Germain	4–3	Bordeaux	Paris
21:00 CET (UTC+1)	Cavani 25', (yellow card) 45+6'; Marquinhos 45+1', 63'; Neymar (yellow card) 45+6' (yellow-red card) 90+3'; Gueye (yellow card) 56'; Mbappé 69'; Kimpembe (yellow card) 85'	Report	Hwang 18'; Kwateng (yellow card) 45+1'; Pablo 45+5'; Bašić (yellow card) 64'; Pardo 83'	Stadium: Parc des Princes; Attendance: 47,771; Referee: Willy Delajod

1 March 2020 27	Bordeaux	1–1	Nice	Bordeaux
17:00 CET (UTC+1)	Kalu (yellow card) 16'; De Préville 21'; Kwateng (yellow card) 57'; Bašić (yellow card) 85'	Report	Thuram (yellow card) 32'; Dante (yellow card) 39'; Ounas 57'; Sarr (yellow card) 90+3'	Stadium: Matmut Atlantique; Attendance: 15,799; Referee: Benoît Millot

8 March 2020 28	Saint-Étienne	1–1	Bordeaux	Saint-Étienne
15:00 CET (UTC+1)	Camara (yellow card) 23' (yellow-red card) 75'; Kolodziejczak (yellow card) 58'; Bouanga 68'; Abi (yellow card) 90+5'	Report	Koscielny (yellow card) 28'; Kalu (yellow card) 37'; Maja 65'; Sabaly (yellow card) 90+2'	Stadium: Stade Geoffroy-Guichard; Attendance: 24,912; Referee: Thomas Léonard

29	Bordeaux	Cancelled	Rennes	Bordeaux
--:-- CET (UTC+1)				Stadium: Matmut Atlantique; Attendance: 0

30	Nîmes	Cancelled	Bordeaux	Nîmes
--:-- CET (UTC+1)				Stadium: Stade des Costières; Attendance: 0

31	Bordeaux	Cancelled	Reims	Bordeaux
--:-- CEST (UTC+2)				Stadium: Matmut Atlantique; Attendance: 0

32	Bordeaux	Cancelled	Amiens	Bordeaux
--:-- CEST (UTC+2)				Stadium: Matmut Atlantique

33	Monaco	Cancelled	Bordeaux	Monaco
--:-- CEST (UTC+2)				Stadium: Stade Louis II

34	Bordeaux	Cancelled	Toulouse	Bordeaux
--:-- CEST (UTC+2)				Stadium: Matmut Atlantique

35	Montpellier	Cancelled	Bordeaux	Montpellier
--:-- CEST (UTC+2)				Stadium: Stade de la Mosson

36	Bordeaux	Cancelled	Angers	Bordeaux
--:-- CEST (UTC+2)				Stadium: Matmut Atlantique

37	Strasbourg	Cancelled	Bordeaux	Strasbourg
--:-- CEST (UTC+2)				Stadium: Stade de la Meinau

38	Bordeaux	Cancelled	Lille	Bordeaux
--:-- CEST (UTC+2)				Stadium: Matmut Atlantique

=== Coupe de France ===
3 January 2020 Round of 64	Bordeaux	2–0	Le Mans	Bordeaux
20:55 CET (UTC+1)	Briand 53' (pen.); Sabaly (yellow card) 61'; Bašić 90+4'	Report	Moussiti-Oko (yellow card) 45+1'; Confais (yellow card) 52'	Stadium: Matmut Atlantique; Attendance: 5,436; Referee: François Letexier

16 January 2020 Round of 32	Pau FC	3–2 (a.e.t.)	Bordeaux	Pau
20:55 CET (UTC+1)	Name 23', (yellow card) 38'; Daubin (yellow card) 32'; Jarju 44'; Gueye 117', (yellow card) 118'	Report	Maja 41'; Benito (yellow card) 77'; De Préville 81'	Stadium: Stade du Hameau; Attendance: 15,668; Referee: Hakim Ben El Hadj

=== Coupe de la Ligue ===
29 October 2019 Round of 32	Bordeaux	2–0	Dijon	Bordeaux
21:05 CET (UTC+1)	Maja 8'; Benito (yellow card) 40'; Otávio (yellow card) 43'; Kalu (yellow card) 88'; De Préville 90+4'	Report	Cádiz (yellow card) 20'	Stadium: Matmut Atlantique; Attendance: 11,391; Referee: Thomas Léonard

18 December 2019 Round of 16	Brest	2–0	Bordeaux	Brest
21:05 CET (UTC+1)	Magnetti (yellow card) 21'; Court (yellow card) 37'; Grandsir 50'; Charbonnier 63'	Report	Tchouaméni (yellow card) 68'	Stadium: Stade Francis-Le Blé; Attendance: 5,434; Referee: Jérémie Pignard

== Statistics ==
=== Appearances and goals ===
No.	Pos	Nat	Player	Total		Ligue 1		Coupe de France		Coupe de la Ligue	
No.	Pos	Nat	Player	Apps	Goals	Apps	Goals	Apps	Goals	Apps	Goals
Goalkeepers
1	GK	(France) FRA	Benoît Costil	29	0	28	0	0	0	1	0
16	GK	(France) FRA	Gaëtan Poussin	3	0	0	0	2	0	1	0
30	GK	(France) FRA	Davy Rouyard	0	0	0	0	0	0	0	0
Defenders
3	DF	(Brazil) BRA	Pablo	28	4	25	4	1	0	2	0
4	DF	(Mozambique) MOZ	Mexer	21	0	16+3	0	1	0	1	0
6	DF	(France) FRA	Laurent Koscielny	28	0	25	0	1	0	2	0
14	DF	(Serbia) SRB	Vukašin Jovanović	11	0	5+4	0	1	0	1	0
20	DF	(Senegal) SEN	Youssouf Sabaly	14	0	10+2	0	1	0	1	0
23	DF	(Switzerland) SUI	Loris Benito	27	1	21+2	1	2	0	2	0
25	DF	(France) FRA	Enock Kwateng	15	0	13+1	0	0+1	0	0	0
29	DF	(France) FRA	Maxime Poundjé	3	0	0+2	0	1	0	0	0
34	DF	(Macau) MAC	David Cardoso	0	0	0	0	0	0	0	0
44	DF	(France) FRA	Paul Baysse	0	0	0	0	0	0	0	0
	DF	(Algeria) ALG	Naoufel Khacef	0	0	0	0	0	0	0	0
Midfielders
5	MF	(Brazil) BRA	Otávio	28	2	25	2	0+2	0	1	0
8	MF	(Spain) ESP	Rubén Pardo	8	1	1+5	1	0	0	2	0
17	MF	(Morocco) MAR	Youssef Aït Bennasser	16	0	6+6	0	2	0	0+2	0
19	MF	(France) FRA	Yacine Adli	25	3	11+10	3	2	0	2	0
24	MF	(France) FRA	Albert Lottin	1	0	1	0	0	0	0	0
26	MF	(Croatia) CRO	Toma Bašić	18	2	11+4	1	1+1	1	1	0
Forwards
7	FW	(France) FRA	Jimmy Briand	26	8	18+4	7	1+1	1	1+1	0
9	FW	(Nigeria) NGR	Josh Maja	24	8	6+15	6	1+1	1	1	1
10	FW	(Nigeria) NGR	Samuel Kalu	22	1	15+5	1	0	0	1+1	0
11	FW	(Guinea) GUI	François Kamano	12	1	7+4	1	0	0	0+1	0
12	FW	(France) FRA	Nicolas de Préville	28	8	23+1	6	1+1	1	1+1	1
18	FW	(South Korea) KOR	Hwang Ui-jo	26	6	19+5	6	1	0	1	0
28	FW	(France) FRA	Rémi Oudin	9	1	5+3	1	1	0	0	0
Players transferred out during the season
8	MF	(France) FRA	Aurélien Tchouaméni	18	0	13+2	0	1	0	2	0
42	FW	(Brazil) BRA	Jonathan Cafú	4	0	2+1	0	1	0	0	0

Last updated: 8 March 2020
Source: Competitions
