= Amadou Traoré =

French footballer (born 2002)

Personal information
- Date of birth: 7 March 2002 (age 24)
- Place of birth: Paris, France
- Height: 1.77 m (5 ft 10 in)
- Position: Winger

Team information
- Current team: Liepāja
- Number: 8

Youth career
- 2008–2015: Paris FC
- 2015–2018: Bordeaux

Senior career*
Years	Team	Apps	(Gls)
2018–2022	Bordeaux B	37	(7)
2020–2022	Bordeaux	20	(0)
2023	Sporting Kansas City II	4	(0)
2023–2024	Panachaiki	33	(0)
2025–	Liepāja	37	(0)

International career^{‡}
2017–2018	France U16	15	(3)
2018–2019	France U17	14	(1)
- * Club domestic league appearances and goals as of 14 June 2026 ‡ National team caps and goals as of 18 January 2021

Amadou Traoré (born 7 March 2002) is a French professional footballer who plays as a winger for Latvian Higher League club Liepāja.

== Club career ==
Traoré signed his first professional contract on 28 May 2019, and made his professional debut for Bordeaux on 25 October 2020.

On 17 January 2023, Traoré signed with MLS Next Pro side Sporting Kansas City II.

== International career ==
Born in France, Traoré holds French and Guinean nationalities. He is a former youth international for France.

== Career statistics ==
As of 1 July 2022

Appearances and goals by club, season and competition
Club	Season	League			Cup		Other		Total	
Club	Season	Division	Apps	Goals	Apps	Goals	Apps	Goals	Apps	Goals
Bordeaux B	2018–19	National 2	6	0	—		—		6	0
Bordeaux B	2019–20	National 3	17	7	—		—		17	7
Bordeaux B	2020–21	National 3	2	0	—		—		2	0
Bordeaux B	2021–22	National 3	12	0	—		—		12	0
Bordeaux B	Total		37	7	—		—		37	7
Bordeaux	2020–21	Ligue 1	19	0	1	0	—		20	0
Bordeaux	2021–22	Ligue 1	1	0	2	0	—		3	0
Bordeaux	Total		20	0	3	0	—		23	0
Career total			57	7	3	0	—		60	7
