= Yacine Adli =

French footballer (born 2000)

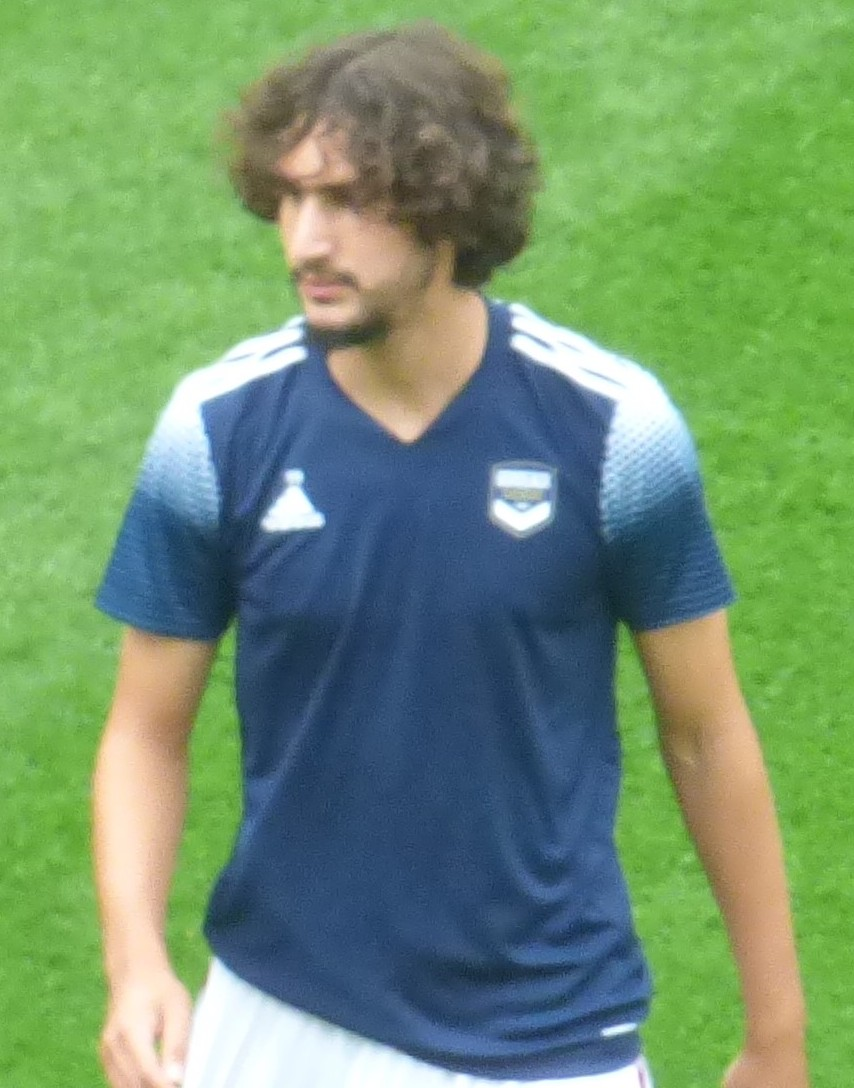
- Adli with Bordeaux in 2020

Personal information
- Full name: Yacine Adli
- Date of birth: 29 July 2000 (age 26)
- Place of birth: Vitry-sur-Seine, France
- Height: 1.86 m (6 ft 1 in)
- Position: Midfielder

Team information
- Current team: Al Shabab
- Number: 29

Youth career
- 2006–2013: US Villejuif
- 2013–2018: Paris Saint-Germain

Senior career*
Years	Team	Apps	(Gls)
2017–2019	Paris Saint-Germain B	20	(4)
2018–2019	Paris Saint-Germain	1	(0)
2019–2021	Bordeaux	67	(5)
2021–2025	AC Milan	30	(1)
2021–2022	→ Bordeaux (loan)	32	(1)
2024–2025	→ Fiorentina (loan)	26	(4)
2025–	Al Shabab	37	(1)

International career
2015–2016	France U16	10	(4)
2016–2017	France U17	16	(6)
2017–2018	France U18	7	(3)
2018–2019	France U19	11	(2)
2018–2019	France U20	5	(1)
- * Club domestic league appearances and goals as of 21:21, 30 October 2026 (UTC)

Yacine Adli (born 29 July 2000) is a French professional footballer who plays as a midfielder for Saudi Pro League club Al Shabab.

== Personal life ==
Adli's parents are from the village of Tizra-Aissa (Draâ El Mizan, Tizi Ouzou Province, Kabylia, Algeria).

== Club career ==
=== Paris Saint-Germain ===
Adli made his professional debut for Paris Saint-Germain (PSG) on 19 May 2018 in the final Ligue 1 match of the season against Caen. He replaced Christopher Nkunku after 83 minutes in a 0–0 away draw. On 2 July 2018, Adli signed his first professional contract with PSG.

=== Bordeaux ===
On 31 January 2019, the last day of the 2018–19 winter transfer window, Adli joined league rivals Bordeaux on a 4 1/2-year contract. The transfer reportedly involved a fee of €5.5 million and a 40% sell-on clause.

Adli scored against his former side Paris Saint-Germain in a 2–2 draw at the Parc des Princes on 28 November 2020.

=== AC Milan ===
On 31 August 2021, it was announced that Adli had signed for Serie A giants AC Milan on a five-year contract. The fee paid to Bordeaux was a reported €8 million. He was loaned back to the club for the remainder of the 2021–22 season.

In his first season at Milan, Adli had very little playtime and made just six sporadic appearances throughout the entire season, all of which were as a substitute in the closing minutes of games.

Despite these setbacks, however, he did not go to play elsewhere on loan, neither during the winter break, nor in the summer.

Ahead of the 2023–24 season, as Milan's primary formation changed from 4–2–3–1 to 4–3–3, Adli started to play in front of the team's defense as a holding midfielder or a deep-lying playmaker, providing an alternative to Rade Krunić, who had been considered a starter in this position at the time. However, as Krunić departed in the winter, Adli took his place in the starting XI.

==== Loan to Fiorentina ====
On 28 August 2024, Adli joined fellow Serie A club Fiorentina, on a season-long loan with an option to make the move permanent.

=== Al Shabab ===
On 10 September 2025, he joined Saudi Pro League club Al Shabab permanently, for an estimated €8 million transfer fee.

== International career ==
Adli was born in France to Algerian parents of Kabyle origins. He holds French and Algerian nationalities. He is a youth international for France, and represented the France U17s at the 2017 UEFA European Under-17 Championship and the 2017 FIFA U-17 World Cup.

== Career statistics ==
As of match played 19 October 2026

Appearances and goals by club, season and competition
Club	Season	League			National cup (Note: Includes Coupe de France, Coppa Italia, King's Cup)		League cup (Note: Includes Coupe de la Ligue)		Continental		Total	
Club	Season	Division	Apps	Goals	Apps	Goals	Apps	Goals	Apps	Goals	Apps	Goals
Paris Saint-Germain B	2017–18	Championnat National 2	9	3	—		—		—		9	3
Paris Saint-Germain B	2018–19	Championnat National 2	11	1	—		—		—		11	1
Paris Saint-Germain B	Total		20	4	—		—		—		20	4
Paris Saint-Germain	2017–18	Ligue 1	1	0	0	0	0	0	0	0	1	0
Paris Saint-Germain	2018–19	Ligue 1	0	0	0	0	0	0	0	0	0	0
Paris Saint-Germain	Total		1	0	0	0	0	0	0	0	1	0
Bordeaux	2018–19	Ligue 1	7	0	0	0	0	0	—		7	0
Bordeaux	2019–20	Ligue 1	21	3	2	0	2	0	—		25	3
Bordeaux	2020–21	Ligue 1	35	2	1	0	—		—		36	2
Bordeaux	2021–22	Ligue 1	36	1	0	0	—		—		36	1
Bordeaux	Total		99	6	3	0	2	0	—		104	6
AC Milan	2022–23	Serie A	6	0	0	0	—		0	0	6	0
AC Milan	2023–24	Serie A	24	1	2	0	—		7 (Note: Three appearances in UEFA Champions League, four appearances in UEFA Europa League)	0	33	1
AC Milan	Total		30	1	2	0	—		7	0	39	1
Fiorentina (loan)	2024–25	Serie A	26	4	0	0	—		9 (Note: Appearances in UEFA Conference League)	1	35	5
Al Shabab	2025–26	Saudi Pro League	26	1	2	0	—		6 (Note: Appearances in AGCFF Gulf Club Champions League)	0	34	1
Al Shabab	2026–27	Saudi Pro League	9	0	1	0	—		—		10	0
Al Shabab	Total		35	1	3	0	—		6	0	44	1
Career total			211	16	8	0	2	0	22	1	243	17

== Honours ==
Paris Saint-Germain

- Ligue 1: 2017–18
- Coupe de la Ligue: 2017–18

Al-Shabab

- AGCFF Gulf Club Champions League runner-up: 2025–26
