= Jimmy Briand =

French footballer (born 1985)

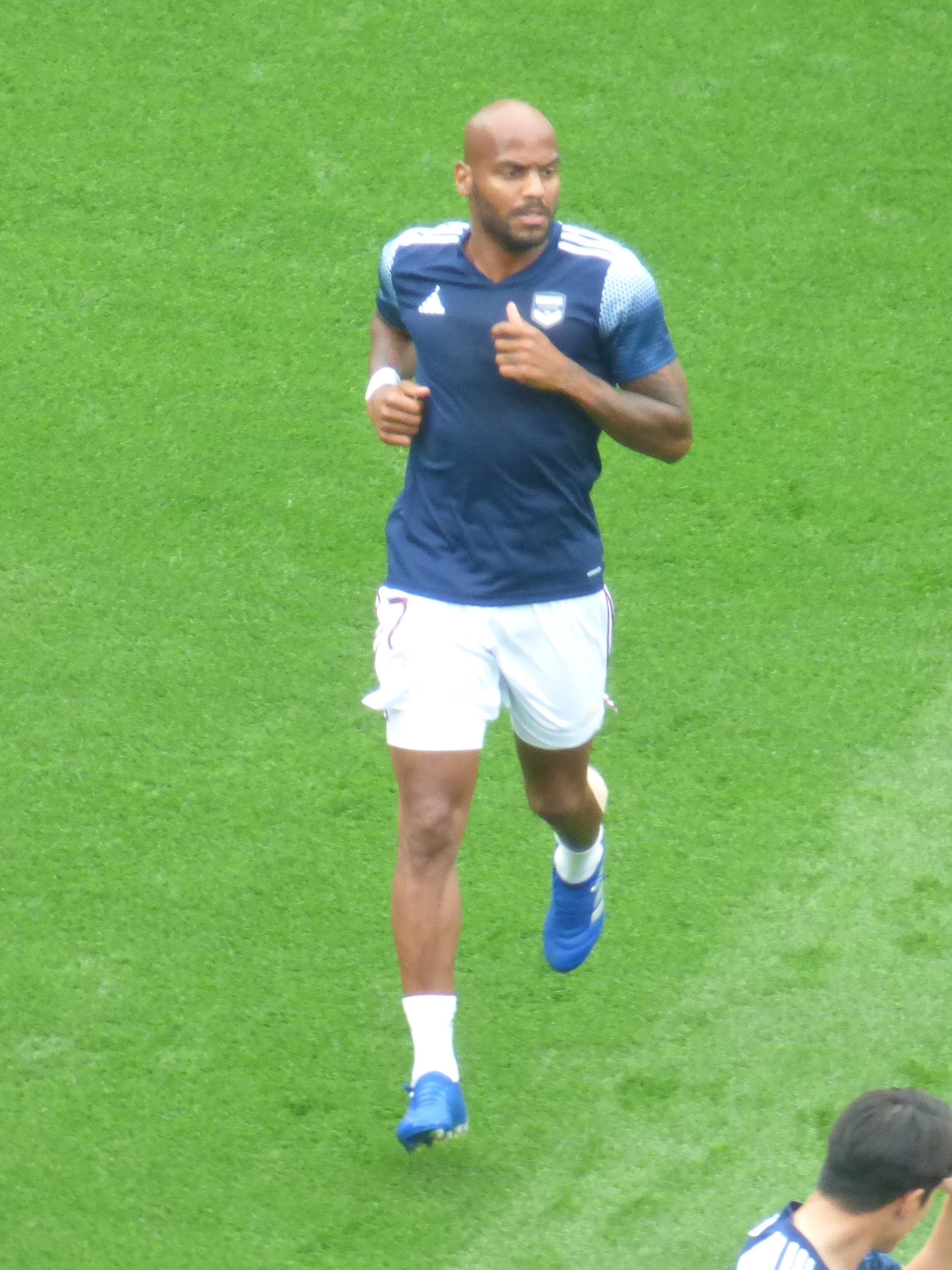
- Briand with Bordeaux in 2020

Personal information
- Full name: Jimmy Julien Briand
- Date of birth: 2 August 1985 (age 41)
- Place of birth: Vitry-sur-Seine, Val-de-Marne, France
- Height: 1.82 m (6 ft 0 in)
- Positions: Winger; striker

Youth career
- 1995–1998: Ivry
- 1998–2000: CSF Brétigny
- 2000–2001: INF Clairefontaine
- 2001–2002: Rennes

Senior career*
Years	Team	Apps	(Gls)
2002–2005	Rennes B	50	(26)
2002–2010	Rennes	169	(33)
2010–2014	Lyon	110	(22)
2014–2015	Hannover 96	29	(3)
2015–2018	Guingamp	106	(30)
2018–2022	Bordeaux	98	(17)
Total		405	(131)

International career
2005–2006	France U21	23	(9)
2008–2012	France	5	(0)
- * Club domestic league appearances and goals

Jimmy Julien Briand (born 2 August 1985) is a French former professional footballer. He started his career as a striker, but was later used as a winger, playing in Ligue 1 for Rennes, Lyon, Guingamp and Bordeaux, as well as in the Bundesliga with Hannover 96 in a professional career lasting 20 years.

A graduate of the Clairefontaine academy, Briand was a France youth international at U21 level, and later made five appearances for the France senior national team from 2008 to 2012, making his debut on 11 October 2008 against Romania.

== Club career ==
=== Rennes ===
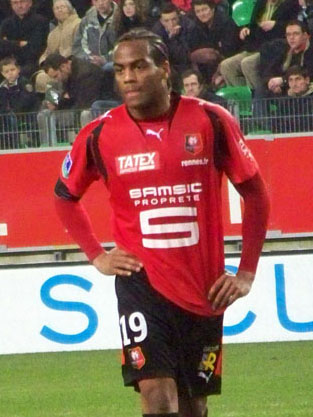
Briand playing for Rennes in 2008

Born in Vitry-sur-Seine, Val-de-Marne, Briand began his career at Ivry, before joining CSF Brétigny. Thereafter, he was selected to attend the INF Clairefontaine. After finishing his stint at the INF Clairefontaine, Briand joined the youth academy of Ligue 1 club Rennes.

While in Rennes' youth system, Briand won the Coupe Gambardella in 2003. He made his first team debut on 20 May 2003 during the 2002–03 Ligue 1 season, at the age of 17, in a Ligue 1 match against Paris Saint-Germain, coming on as a substitute and playing 25 minutes. The match finished 0–0. Over the next two seasons, his play was limited to appearing in only 17 Ligue 1 matches and scoring just one Ligue 1 goal (his first ever), against Montpellier in a 4–0 victory.

Briand finally broke into the first team for the 2005–06 season, appearing in 29 Ligue 1 matches and scoring three Ligue 1 goals to help Rennes finish in 7th position in the 2005-06 Ligue 1; they just missed qualifying for the 2006 UEFA Intertoto Cup by one spot. Over the next two years, he appeared in all but four of the club's Ligue 1 matches, due to his consistently good performances in competitive matches and his not sustaining injuries. Despite being linked to clubs outside France, Briand decided to stay with Rennes for the 2008–09 season, during which he scored a club-high eight Ligue 1 goals. On 26 March 2009, Briand ruptured his anterior cruciate ligament in his left knee, while training with the France national team. The injury required six months to heal. As a result, Briand only made his 2009–10 Ligue 1 season debut for Rennes on 29 October, in a Ligue 1 match against Monaco. He finished the 2009–10 season with 23 appearances, scoring five goals.

=== Lyon ===
On 14 June 2010, Lyon president and chairman Jean-Michel Aulas announced that the club had signed Briand to a four-year contract effective on 1 July. The transfer fee was priced at €7.4 million. On 7 August 2010, he made his competitive debut for the club in a 0–0 home draw against Monaco, playing every minute of the match. On 18 February 2011, Briand scored an overhead bicycle kick goal in a 4–0 home win over Nancy.

=== Hannover 96 ===
Bundesliga club Hannover 96 confirmed the signing of Briand on 22 August 2014.

=== Guingamp ===
On 3 August 2015, Briand joined Guingamp on a two-year contract. On 17 May 2017, Briand extended his contract by two years, keeping him with the club until 30 June 2019.

On 11 May 2018, Briand scored a goal from the penalty spot, his fifth goal in his last six Ligue 1 matches, in the 3–3 Ligue 1 home draw against Olympique de Marseille; it was also his 30th career Ligue 1 goal for Guingamp since joining them in August 2015.

=== Bordeaux ===
On 10 August 2018, Briand joined Guingamp's Ligue 1 rivals, Bordeaux, on a two-year contract. He was released by Guingamp just three weeks before joining Bordeaux, with one year left on his contract with Guingamp. He had a "moral agreement" that he would not join another Ligue 1 club. Briand had secured a tentative deal to join Major League Soccer club Montreal Impact, but it fell through on 26 July 2018.

On 31 August 2019, Briand scored the equalizer for Bordeaux, in an 1–1 away draw against Lyon, to become only the second player to score in 15 different Ligue 1 seasons in the 21st century, following in the footsteps of Souleymane Camara. On 25 October 2020, Briand scored his 100th Ligue 1 goal in a 2–0 win over Nîmes. In June 2022, he confirmed his departure from Bordeaux.

Briand announced his retirement from playing in September 2022.

== International career ==
Briand played for the under-21 team from 2004 to 2006, scoring 9 goals in 25 appearances. He was a member of the French squad that participated in the 2006 UEFA European Under-21 Championship helping France reach the semi-finals before losing to the Netherlands.

Briand received his first call-up to the senior side in May 2007 for France's Euro 2008 qualification matches against Ukraine and Georgia. He would not make his debut in those matches. On 11 October 2008, Briand made his international debut, coming on as a substitute for Franck Ribéry in the 90th minute, against Romania, in a 2010 World Cup away qualifying match that ended in a 2–2 draw.

== Career statistics ==
=== Club ===
Appearances and goals by club, season and competition
Club	Season	League			Cup (Note: Includes Coupe de France, Coupe de la Ligue, DFB-Pokal)		Continental		Other		Total	
Club	Season	Division	Apps	Goals	Apps	Goals	Apps	Goals	Apps	Goals	Apps	Goals
Rennes	2002–03	Ligue 1	1	0	0	0	—		—		1	0
Rennes	2003–04	Ligue 1	7	1	3	1	—		—		10	2
Rennes	2004–05	Ligue 1	10	0	3	0	—		—		13	0
Rennes	2005–06	Ligue 1	28	3	6	1	6	1	—		40	5
Rennes	2006–07	Ligue 1	35	9	4	1	—		—		39	10
Rennes	2007–08	Ligue 1	37	7	4	1	6	0	—		47	8
Rennes	2008–09	Ligue 1	27	8	4	4	3	0	—		34	12
Rennes	2009–10	Ligue 1	23	5	4	1	—		—		27	6
Rennes	Total		168	33	26	8	15	1	0	0	211	42
Lyon	2010–11	Ligue 1	33	6	3	1	8	1	—		44	8
Lyon	2011–12	Ligue 1	37	9	9	3	10	2	—		56	14
Lyon	2012–13	Ligue 1	15	1	1	0	3	1	1 (Note: Appearance in Trophée des Champions)	1	20	3
Lyon	2013–14	Ligue 1	25	6	5	2	10	1	—		40	9
Lyon	Total		110	22	18	7	31	5	1	1	160	35
Hannover 96	2014–15	Bundesliga	29	3	1	0	—		—		30	3
Guingamp	2015–16	Ligue 1	35	7	4	1	—		—		39	8
Guingamp	2016–17	Ligue 1	34	12	5	1	—		—		39	13
Guingamp	2017–18	Ligue 1	37	11	3	0	—		—		40	11
Guingamp	Total		106	30	12	2	0	0	0	0	118	32
Bordeaux	2018–19	Ligue 1	35	7	4	1	7	3	—		46	11
Bordeaux	2019–20	Ligue 1	22	7	4	1	—		—		26	8
Bordeaux	2020–21	Ligue 1	24	1	1	0	—		—		25	1
Bordeaux	2021–22	Ligue 1	17	2	2	0	—		—		19	2
Bordeaux	Total		98	17	11	2	7	3	0	0	116	22
Career total			511	105	70	19	53	9	1	1	635	134

== Honours ==
Lyon

- Coupe de France: 2011–12
- Trophée des Champions: 2012
