= Gaëtan Poussin =

French association football player (born 1999)

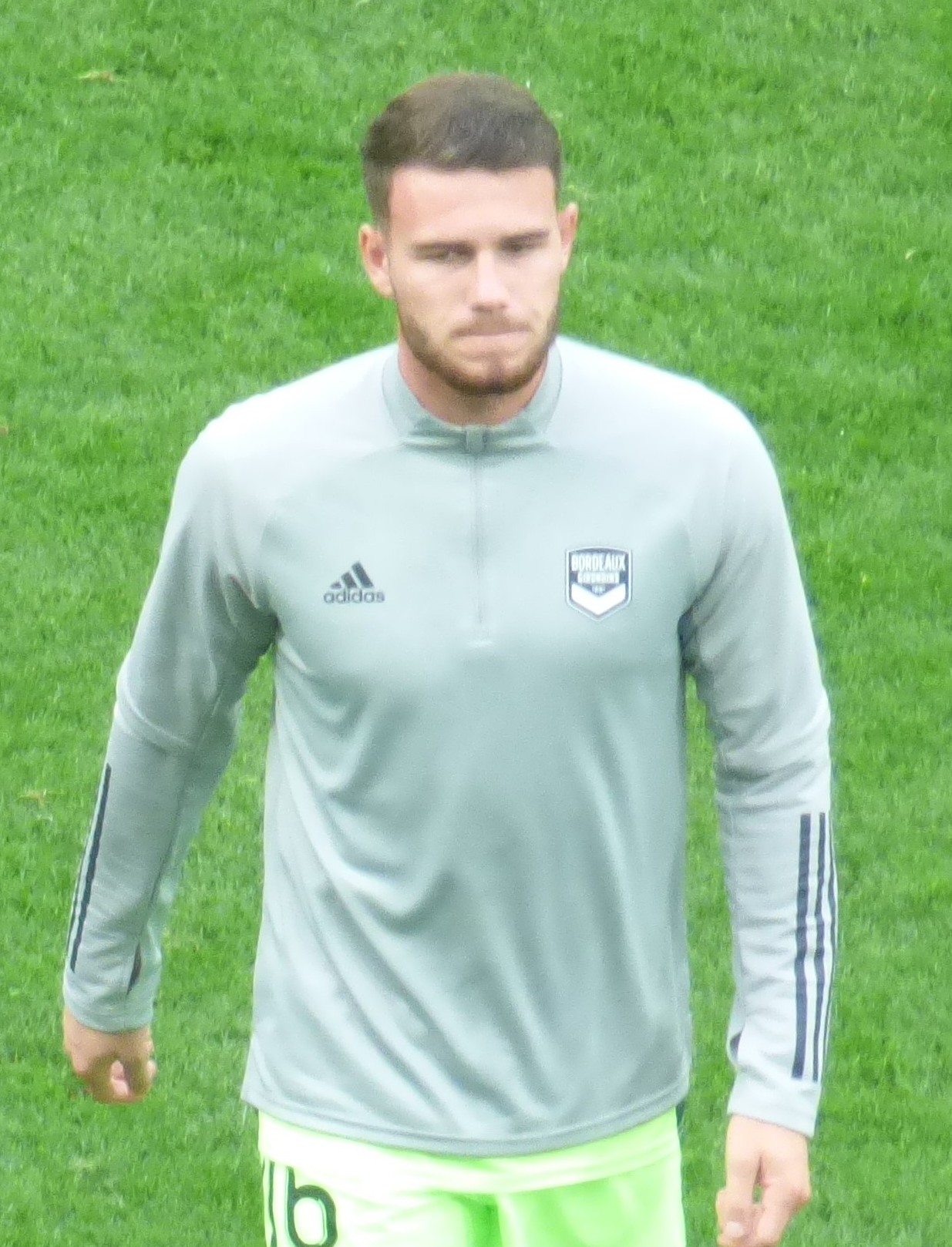
- Poussin with Bordeaux in 2020

Personal information
- Date of birth: 13 January 1999 (age 27)
- Place of birth: Le Mans, France
- Height: 1.84 m (6 ft 0 in)
- Position: Goalkeeper

Team information
- Current team: Red Star
- Number: 16

Youth career
- 2005–2011: VS Fertois
- 2011–2014: Le Mans
- 2014–2018: Bordeaux

Senior career*
Years	Team	Apps	(Gls)
2016–2022	Bordeaux II	20	(0)
2018–2023	Bordeaux	50	(0)
2023–2025	Zaragoza	37	(1)
2025–	Red Star	32	(0)

International career
2014–2015	France U16	10	(0)
2015–2016	France U17	8	(0)
2016–2017	France U18	5	(0)
2017	France U19	4	(0)
- * Club domestic league appearances and goals as of 9 May 2026

Gaëtan Poussin (born 13 January 1999) is a French professional footballer who plays as a goalkeeper for Red Star.

== Club career ==
Poussin signed his first professional contract with Bordeaux in the fall of 2018. He made his professional debut with Bordeaux in a 1–0 Coupe de la Ligue win over Dijon on 19 December 2018.

On 27 July 2023, Spanish Segunda División side Real Zaragoza announced the signing of Poussin on a three-year contract. On 12 April 2025, he scored a last-minute equalizer in a 2–2 draw with Eibar.

On 16 August 2025, Poussin returned to his home country after joining Ligue 2 side Red Star.

== International career ==
Poussin is a youth international for France, and represented the France U17s at the 2016 UEFA European Under-17 Championship.

== Career statistics ==
As of match played 2 June 2023

Appearances and goals by club, season and competition
Club	Season	League			National cup		League cup		Other		Total	
Club	Season	Division	Apps	Goals	Apps	Goals	Apps	Goals	Apps	Goals	Apps	Goals
Bordeaux B	2016–17	CFA 2	6	0	—		—		—		6	0
Bordeaux B	2017–18	National 3	13	0	—		—		—		13	0
Bordeaux B	2021–22	National 3	1	0	—		—		—		1	0
Bordeaux B	Total		20	0	—		—		—		20	0
Bordeaux	2018–19	Ligue 1	1	0	0	0	2	0	0	0	3	0
Bordeaux	2019–20	Ligue 1	0	0	2	0	1	0	—		3	0
Bordeaux	2020–21	Ligue 1	0	0	1	0	—		—		1	0
Bordeaux	2021–22	Ligue 1	13	0	1	0	—		—		14	0
Bordeaux	2022–23	Ligue 2	36	0	0	0	—		—		36	0
Bordeaux	Total		50	0	4	0	3	0	0	0	57	0
Career total			70	0	4	0	3	0	0	0	77	0
