= Hwang Ui-jo =

South Korean footballer (born 1992)

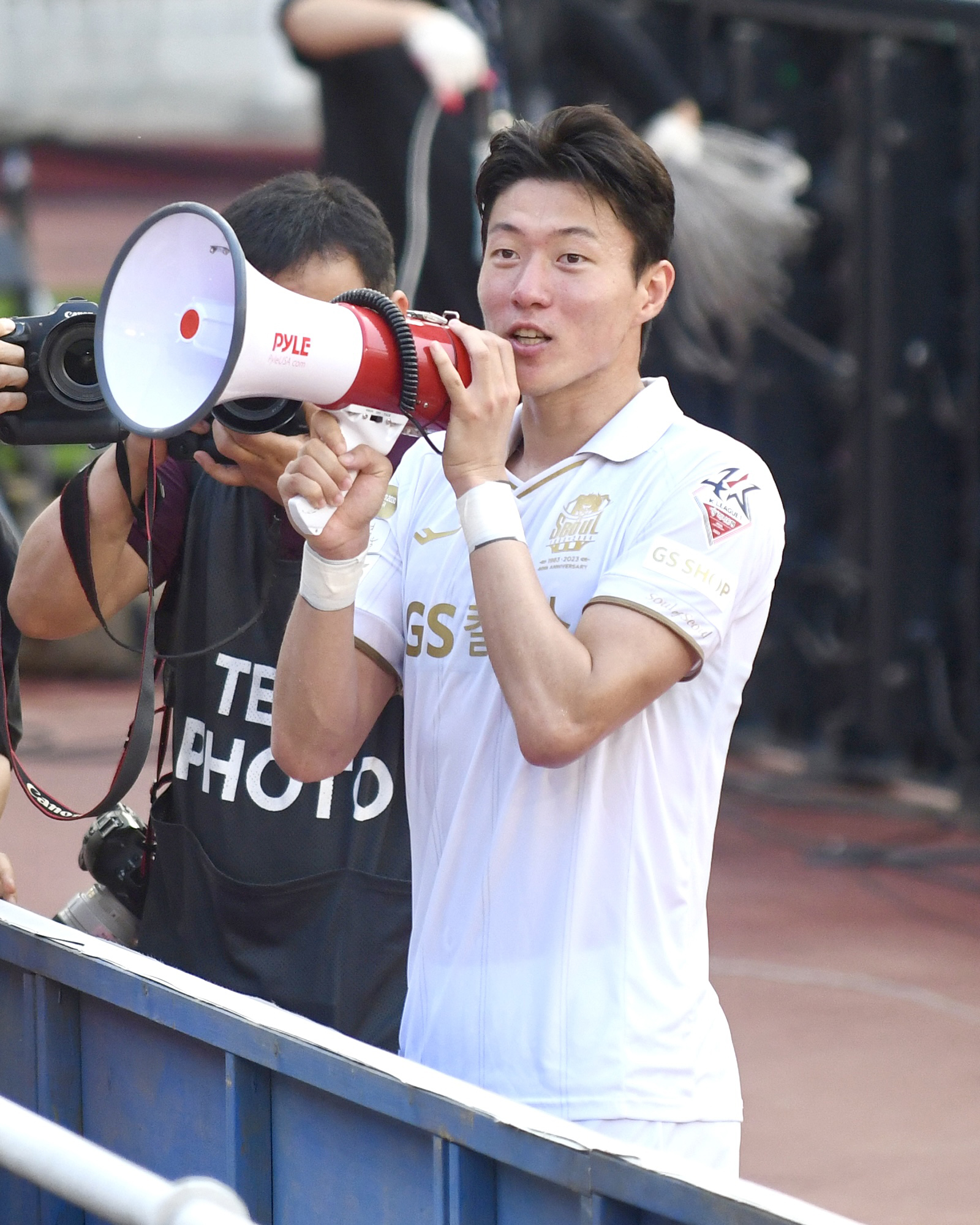
- Hwang with FC Seoul in 2023

Personal information
- Full name: Hwang Ui-jo
- Date of birth: 28 August 1992 (age 34)
- Place of birth: Seongnam, South Korea
- Height: 1.85 m (6 ft 1 in)
- Position: Striker

Team information
- Current team: Alanyaspor
- Number: 16

Youth career
- 2008–2010: Seongnam FC (Note: Played for Pungsaeng High School, which was an academy of Seongnam FC.)

College career
Years	Team	Apps	(Gls)
2011–2012	Yonsei University		

Senior career*
Years	Team	Apps	(Gls)
2013–2017	Seongnam FC	139	(35)
2017–2019	Gamba Osaka	60	(23)
2019–2022	Bordeaux	94	(29)
2022–2024	Nottingham Forest	0	(0)
2022–2023	→ Olympiacos (loan)	5	(0)
2023	→ FC Seoul (loan)	18	(4)
2023–2024	→ Norwich City (loan)	17	(3)
2024	→ Alanyaspor (loan)	8	(1)
2024–	Alanyaspor	71	(11)

International career^{‡}
2009	South Korea U17	3	(0)
2012–2021	South Korea U23	28 (Note: Includes thirteen appearances and thirteen goals as an overage player (seven appearances and nine goals in Asian Games, four appearances and four goals in Summer Olympics, two appearances in friendlies).)	(18)
2015–2023	South Korea	62	(19)
Medal record
Men's football
Representing South Korea
Asian Games
Gold medal – first place	2018 Jakarta-Palembang	Team
- * Club domestic league appearances and goals as of 18 October 2026 ‡ National team caps and goals as of 21 November 2023

- Hwang Ui-jo
- Hangul: 황의조
- Hanja: 黃義助
- RR: Hwang Uijo
- MR: Hwang Ŭijo
- IPA: [hwaŋ.ɰi.dʑo], [hwaŋ.i.dʑo] or [hwaŋ] [ɰi.dʑo]

Hwang Ui-jo (Korean: 황의조; born 28 August 1992) is a South Korean professional footballer who plays as a striker for Süper Lig club Alanyaspor.

== Club career ==
=== Seongnam FC ===
Hwang was selected by Seongnam Ilhwa Chunma in 2013 K League 1 draft. He scored his debut goal against Suwon Samsung Bluewings on 3 March 2013. During the 2015 season, he showed outstanding performances with 15 goals in the K League 1, and made his debut in the South Korean national team. He also scored three goals in the AFC Champions League. In 2016, however, Seongnam left poor results, and Hwang also underperformed at the time. They finished the league in 11th place among 12 clubs, and were eventually relegated to the K League 2 after the promotion-relegation playoffs.

=== Gamba Osaka ===
In June 2017, Hwang signed a two-year contract with J1 League club Gamba Osaka. In the 2018 season, he played a vital role for Gamba to avoid relegation, and finished the season as the team's top scorer with 21 goals. He was selected for the J.League Best XI and was named Gamba's Player of the Year.

=== Bordeaux ===
On 15 July 2019, Hwang moved to Ligue 1 club Bordeaux, signing a four-year deal worth €1.8 million per year. He originally played as a striker for the South Korean national team and Gamba Osaka, but the Bordeaux manager Paulo Sousa usually used him as a winger. Under Sousa, Hwang scored only six goals including a header scored against Paris Saint-Germain.

Hwang was continuously deployed as a winger early next season, although Sousa was replaced by Jean-Louis Gasset. However, he failed to score in 12 consecutive games, and scored his first goal of the season on 16 December. He was eventually returned to the striker position by Gasset, and successfully spent the remainder of the season by adding 11 goals.

On 23 January 2022, Hwang scored his first hat-trick of his Bordeaux's career, as the club won 4–3 against Strasbourg.

=== Nottingham Forest ===
==== Loan spells ====
On 26 August 2022, Premier League club Nottingham Forest announced the signing of Hwang. He was immediately loaned out to Greek club Olympiacos. He was unsuccessful at Olympiacos, and his loan contract was terminated early after he failed to score for five months.

On 3 February 2023, Hwang joined South Korean club FC Seoul on a five-month loan. Although he didn't score many goals, he played a key role in FC Seoul's attack, helping the team retain possession and apply pressure on opponents.

Hwang attempted to secure a spot at Nottingham Forest before the 2023–24 season but managed just one goal in six pre-season games. On 1 September 2023, he joined EFL Championship club Norwich City on loan for the 2023–24 season. After failing to score in his first eight appearances, he found form with three goals in his next five matches. However, he suffered a hamstring injury while scoring his third goal. He returned to action after a month but suffered a relapse just two weeks later. As a result, his loan spell was cut short, and Norwich terminated his contract early on 9 January 2024.

On 6 February 2024, Hwang was loaned to Süper Lig club Alanyaspor until the end of the season. He scored in the last Süper Lig match against Antalyaspor.

=== Alanyaspor ===
On 6 September 2024, Hwang signed a one-year contract with Alanyaspor. He signed a two-year contract extension with the club after scoring seven goals at the 2024–25 Süper Lig.

== International career ==
On 13 October 2015, Hwang scored his first international goal against Jamaica.

Hwang participated in the 2018 Asian Games as an over-aged player of the South Korean under-23 team. He scored a hat-trick in the first group stage match against Bahrain on 15 August and another in the quarter-finals against Uzbekistan, leading South Korea to a 4–3 victory. In all, Hwang scored nine goals in seven matches as South Korea won gold. He was named the Korean FA Player of the Year after showing his worth in Asian Games and J1 League.

Hwang played for South Korea in the 2019 AFC Asian Cup, scoring against Philippines and China.

Hwang was also selected as an over-aged player for the under-23 team for the 2020 Summer Olympics. During the competition, he scored four goals, but failed to show great influence. South Korea were eliminated in the quarter-finals.

== Personal life ==
On 25 June 2023, an unidentified user on the social networking service Instagram posted explicit clips of a sex video, allegedly showing Hwang and a woman who did not know she was being filmed. The user claimed to be a former lover of Hwang's, and accused Hwang of gaslighting her and other women, alleging that he had intimate and sexual relations with multiple partners without formally establishing a relationship due the prospects of returning to his football club Nottingham Forest in England. She also claimed that videos on his mobile phone with these women may have been taken without consent or by hidden cameras; she posted private conversations and recordings on the social media platform. Hwang's management company UJ Sports denied the allegations and stated that it would take legal action against the distributor of the contents.

Police investigations traced the user's IP address to Hwang's own house, and investigators identified Hwang's sister-in-law, who was working as his personal manager at the time, as the suspect. The sister-in-law, who has only been publicly identified by her surname "Lee", was charged with violating South Korean laws relating to sex crimes and committing blackmail. She originally denied the allegations, but later confessed that she leaked the videos as an act of revenge as she felt Hwang had "[been] ungrateful" towards her and her husband for their support of his career. She was sentenced to three years in prison.

Concurrently, a second police investigation was launched into allegations that the sex footage on Hwang's mobile phone had been filmed without the knowledge or consent of the women involved. In November 2023, he was suspended by South Korea pending a police inquiry into the claims. On 11 July 2024, Seoul Central District Prosecutors' Office informed Hwang that he was to be indicted on two charges related to alleged breaches of South Korea's Act on Special Cases Concerning the Punishment of Sexual Crimes. Hwang was alleged to have filmed two women without consent on four occasions between June and September 2022. On 14 February 2025, Hwang was convicted of charges related to one of the women, but acquitted of charges related to other. He was sentenced to a suspended one-year prison term.

== Career statistics ==
=== Club ===
As of match played 28 October 2026

Appearances and goals by club, season and competition
Club	Season	League			National cup (Note: Includes Korean FA Cup, Emperor's Cup, Coupe de France, Greek Football Cup, Turkish Cup)		League cup (Note: Includes J.League Cup, Coupe de la Ligue, EFL Cup)		Continental		Other		Total	
Club	Season	Division	Apps	Goals	Apps	Goals	Apps	Goals	Apps	Goals	Apps	Goals	Apps	Goals
Seongnam FC	2013	K League 1	22	2	2	1	—		—		—		24	3
Seongnam FC	2014	K League 1	28	4	4	1	—		—		—		32	5
Seongnam FC	2015	K League 1	34	15	3	3	—		8 (Note: Appearances in AFC Champions League)	3	—		45	21
Seongnam FC	2016	K League 1	37	9	3	0	—		—		1 (Note: Appearance in K League promotion-relegation playoffs)	0	41	9
Seongnam FC	2017	K League 2	18	5	3	0	—		—		—		21	5
Seongnam FC	Total		139	35	15	5	—		8	3	1	0	163	43
Gamba Osaka	2017	J1 League	13	3	0	0	2	0	—		—		15	3
Gamba Osaka	2018	J1 League	27	16	1	0	6	5	—		—		34	21
Gamba Osaka	2019	J1 League	19	4	0	0	3	3	—		—		22	7
Gamba Osaka	Total		59	23	1	0	11	8	—		—		71	31
Bordeaux	2019–20	Ligue 1	24	6	1	0	1	0	—		—		26	6
Bordeaux	2020–21	Ligue 1	36	12	1	0	—		—		—		37	12
Bordeaux	2021–22	Ligue 1	32	11	1	0	—		—		—		33	11
Bordeaux	2022–23	Ligue 2	2	0	0	0	—		—		—		2	0
Bordeaux	Total		94	29	3	0	1	0	—		—		98	29
Olympiacos (Ioan)	2022–23	Super League Greece	5	0	1	0	—		6 (Note: Appearances in UEFA Europa League)	0	—		12	0
FC Seoul (Ioan)	2023	K League 1	18	4	0	0	—		—		—		18	4
Norwich City (Ioan)	2023–24	Championship	17	3	0	0	1	0	—		—		18	3
Alanyaspor (Ioan)	2023–24	Süper Lig	8	1	0	0	—		—		—		8	1
Alanyaspor	2024–25	Süper Lig	30	7	3	0	—		—		—		33	7
Alanyaspor	2025–26	Süper Lig	33	4	5	0	—		—		—		38	4
Alanyaspor	2026–27	Süper Lig	8	0	1	1	—		—		—		9	1
Alanyaspor	Total		71	11	9	1	—		—		—		80	12
Career total			411	106	29	6	13	8	14	3	1	0	467	123

=== International ===
Scores and results list South Korea's goal tally first, score column indicates score after each Hwang goal.

List of international goals scored by Hwang Ui-jo
No.	Date	Venue	Opponent	Score	Result	Competition
1	13 October 2015	Seoul World Cup Stadium, Seoul, South Korea	Jamaica	3–0	3–0	Friendly
2	12 October 2018	Seoul World Cup Stadium, Seoul, South Korea	Uruguay	1–0	2–1	Friendly
3	17 November 2018	Suncorp Stadium, Brisbane, Australia	Australia	1–0	1–1	Friendly
4	20 November 2018	QSAC, Brisbane, Australia	Uzbekistan	2–0	4–0	Friendly
5	7 January 2019	Al-Maktoum Stadium, Dubai, United Arab Emirates	Philippines	1–0	1–0	2019 AFC Asian Cup
6	16 January 2019	Al-Nahyan Stadium, Abu Dhabi, United Arab Emirates	China	1–0	2–0	2019 AFC Asian Cup
7	7 June 2019	Busan Asiad Main Stadium, Busan, South Korea	Australia	1–0	1–0	Friendly
8	11 June 2019	Seoul World Cup Stadium, Seoul, South Korea	Iran	1–0	1–1	Friendly
9	5 September 2019	Başakşehir Fatih Terim Stadium, Istanbul, Turkey	Georgia	1–1	2–2	Friendly
10	5 September 2019	Başakşehir Fatih Terim Stadium, Istanbul, Turkey	Georgia	2–1	2–2	Friendly
11	14 November 2020	Stadion Wiener Neustadt, Wiener Neustadt, Austria	Mexico	1–0	2–3	Friendly
12	17 November 2020	BSFZ-Arena, Maria Enzersdorf, Austria	Qatar	2–1	2–1	Friendly
13	5 June 2021	Goyang Stadium, Goyang, South Korea	Turkmenistan	1–0	5–0	2022 FIFA World Cup qualification
14	5 June 2021	Goyang Stadium, Goyang, South Korea	Turkmenistan	5–0	5–0	2022 FIFA World Cup qualification
15	2 June 2022	Seoul World Cup Stadium, Seoul, South Korea	Brazil	1–1	1–5	Friendly
16	14 June 2022	Seoul World Cup Stadium, Seoul, South Korea	Egypt	1–0	4–1	Friendly
17	20 June 2023	Daejeon World Cup Stadium, Daejeon, South Korea	El Salvador	1–0	1–1	Friendly
18	13 October 2023	Seoul World Cup Stadium, Seoul, South Korea	Tunisia	4–0	4–0	Friendly
19	16 November 2023	Seoul World Cup Stadium, Seoul, South Korea	Singapore	4–0	5–0	2026 FIFA World Cup qualification

== Honours ==
Seongnam FC

- Korean FA Cup: 2014

South Korea U23

- Asian Games: 2018

Individual

- K League All-Star: 2015
- Asian Games top goalscorer: 2018
- Gamba Osaka Player of the Year: 2018
- J1 League Monthly MVP: November/December 2018
- Korean FA Player of the Year: 2018
- J1 League Best XI: 2018
- Korean FA Goal of the Year: 2019
