= Timothée Pembélé =

French footballer (born 2002)

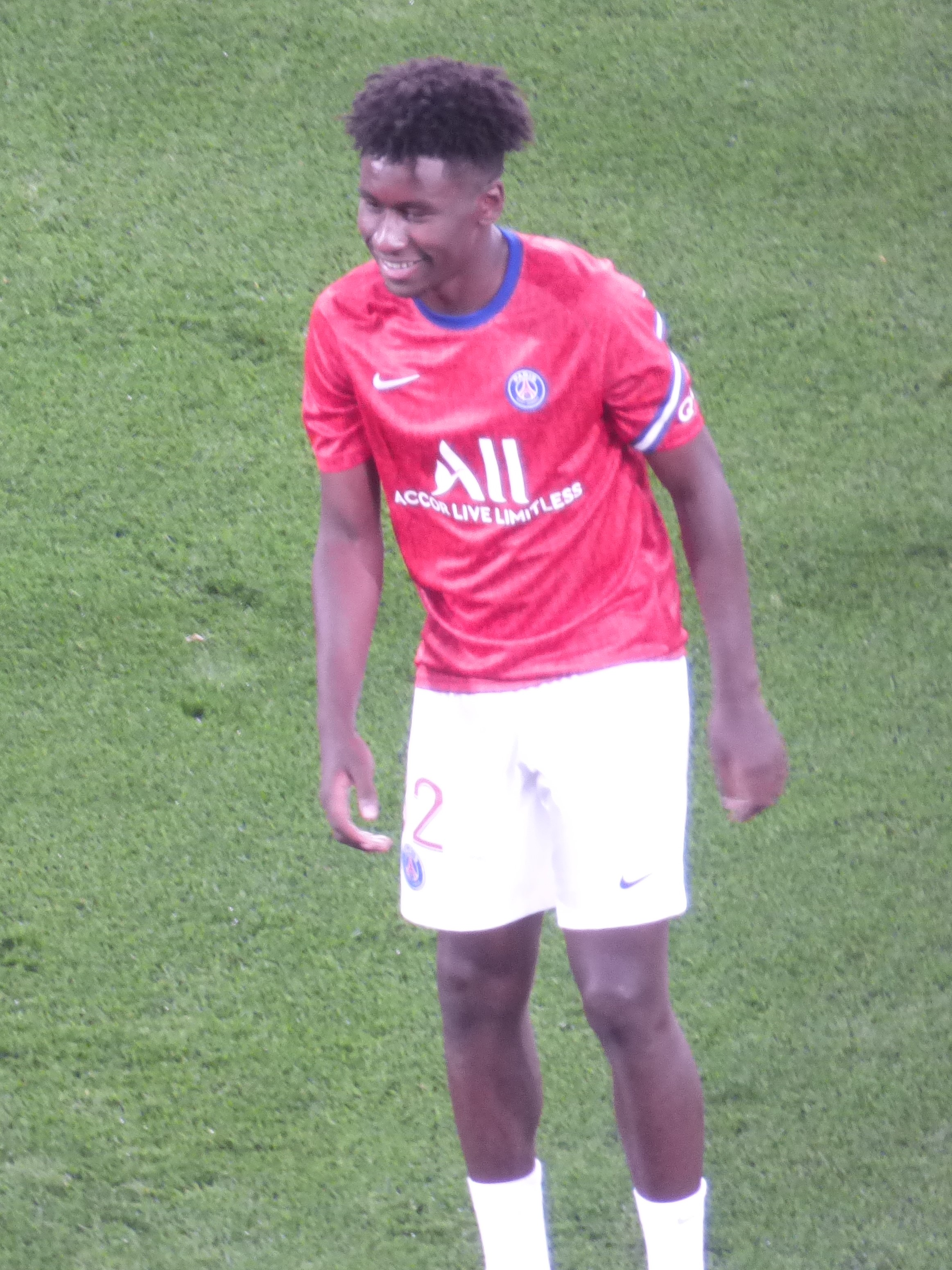
- Pembélé with Paris Saint-Germain in 2020

Personal information
- Full name: Timothée Joseph Pembélé
- Date of birth: 9 September 2002 (age 24)
- Place of birth: Beaumont-sur-Oise, France
- Height: 1.83 m (6 ft 0 in)
- Position: Right-back

Team information
- Current team: Le Havre
- Number: 32

Youth career
- 2008–2015: US Persan 03
- 2015–2020: Paris Saint-Germain

Senior career*
Years	Team	Apps	(Gls)
2020–2023	Paris Saint-Germain	11	(1)
2021–2022	→ Bordeaux (loan)	26	(1)
2023–2026	Sunderland	8	(0)
2024–2025	→ Le Havre (loan)	20	(1)
2026	→ Le Havre (loan)	14	(0)
2026–	Le Havre	3	(0)

International career
2017–2018	France U16	11	(0)
2018–2019	France U17	9	(0)
2019–2020	France U18	9	(3)
2021–2022	France U20	3	(0)
2021	France Olympic	2	(0)
Medal record
Men's football
Representing France
FIFA U-17 World Cup
Third place	2019 Brazil
UEFA European Under-17 Championship
Bronze medal – third place	2019 Ireland
- * Club domestic league appearances and goals as of 6 September 2026

Timothée Joseph Pembélé (French pronunciation: [ti.mɔ.te pɛm.be.le]; born 9 September 2002) is a French professional footballer who plays as a right-back for Ligue 1 club Le Havre.

== Club career ==
=== Paris Saint-Germain ===
Pembélé joined the Paris Saint-Germain Academy at the age of 13 in 2015, having spent the previous seven years of his youth career at US Persan 03. On 4 July 2018, at the age of 15, he signed his first professional contract with Paris Saint-Germain (PSG), tying him to the club until 30 June 2021.

==== 2020–21: Debut season ====
On 28 November 2020, Pembélé made his professional debut in a 2–2 Ligue 1 draw against Bordeaux, starting as a right center-back in a pairing with Presnel Kimpembe. Despite scoring an own goal at the tenth minute of the match, Pembélé's performance was regarded by most observers as a very promising one. He made good use of his speed and vision in defence, recovering the ball on several occasions, and helped his team move forward in attack with several successful vertical passes. At one point in the match, he dribbled a distance of 40 meters with the ball, leading to a corner for PSG. On 4 December 2020, Pembélé extended his contract with PSG to 2024. He made his UEFA Champions League debut five days later, coming on as a substitute for Alessandro Florenzi in a 5–1 win against İstanbul Başakşehir. Pembélé’s first goal for Paris Saint-Germain came in a 4–0 victory over Strasbourg on 23 December.

==== 2021–22: Loan to Bordeaux ====
On 10 August 2021, Pembélé joined Bordeaux on a season-long loan with an option-to-buy. He scored in his debut match, a 2–2 league draw against Marseille. On 19 December 2021, he scored the first brace of his career in a 10–0 Coupe de France win over Jumeaux de M'zouazia. On 10 April 2022, he suffered an anterior cruciate ligament (ACL) injury in a match against Metz, effectively his last match of the season. It was confirmed on 9 June 2022 that he would leave Bordeaux following the expiration of his loan deal.

==== 2022–23: Return from injury and Ligue 1 title ====
Pembélé was out injured for the first part of the 2022–23 season, due to an ACL injury he had suffered in April 2022. After nine months on the sidelines, he made his return to play in a friendly game on 19 January 2023, coming on as a substitute in a 5–4 win over the hybrid Riyadh Season Team. His first official match back from injury was a start in a 7–0 Coupe de France victory over Pays de Cassel on 23 January. Pembélé made his return to play in Ligue 1 in a 3–1 defeat to Monaco on 11 February. He won his first Ligue 1 title at the end of the season.

=== Sunderland ===
On 1 September 2023, Pembélé joined EFL Championship club Sunderland on a five-year contract.

==== Loans to Le Havre ====
On 30 August 2024, Pembélé signed for Ligue 1 club Le Havre on a season-long loan.

On 6 January 2026, Pembélé returned to Le Havre on another loan.

=== Le Havre ===
On 16 July 2026, Pembélé signed with Le Havre on a permanent deal.

== International career ==
Pembélé has represented France at U16, U17, and U18 level. He made a total of 6 appearances at the 2019 FIFA U-17 World Cup, a tournament in which France finished third.

On 2 July 2021, Pembélé was included in the 21-player list selected to represent France at the 2020 Summer Olympics.

== Style of play ==
Having played different positions such as right-back, left-back, and center-back, Pembélé has been described as being a versatile defender. In an interview with ArchySport, he stated that he prefers to play on the right side of defence. "I really like to attack, to defend well too. This side in general is where I feel best," said Pembélé. He is right-footed.

According to Culture PSG, Pembélé is a quick player equipped with good technique, and he constantly brings an offensive threat on his side of the pitch. He boasts above-average skills in reading the game, which has helped him when repositioning on the field during matches. Pembélé is adept at stealing the ball of attackers with his pace and tenacity, using his technique to turn while hugging the touchline, and accelerating past the opponent he was marking moments earlier.

== Personal life ==
Pembélé was born in Beaumont-sur-Oise in France. He is of Congolese descent.

== Career statistics ==
As of match played 6 September 2026

Appearances and goals by club, season and competition
Club	Season	League			National cup (Note: Includes Coupe de France)		League cup		Europe		Total	
Club	Season	Division	Apps	Goals	Apps	Goals	Apps	Goals	Apps	Goals	Apps	Goals
Paris Saint-Germain	2020–21	Ligue 1	6	1	2	0	—		1 (Note: Appearance in UEFA Champions League)	0	9	1
Paris Saint-Germain	2022–23	Ligue 1	5	0	1	0	—		0	0	6	0
Paris Saint-Germain	Total		11	1	3	0	—		1	0	15	1
Bordeaux (loan)	2021–22	Ligue 1	26	1	2	2	—		—		28	3
Sunderland	2023–24	Championship	8	0	0	0	0	0	—		8	0
Le Havre (loan)	2024–25	Ligue 1	20	1	1	0	—		—		21	1
Le Havre (loan)	2025–26	Ligue 1	14	0	—		—		—		14	0
Le Havre	2026–27	Ligue 1	3	0	0	0	—		—		3	0
Career total			82	3	6	2	0	0	1	0	89	5

== Honours ==
Paris Saint-Germain

- Ligue 1: 2022–23
- Coupe de France: 2020–21
- Trophée des Champions: 2020

France U17

- FIFA U-17 World Cup third place: 2019

Individual

- UEFA European Under-17 Championship Team of the Tournament: 2019
