= Mehdi Zerkane =

Footballer (born 1999)

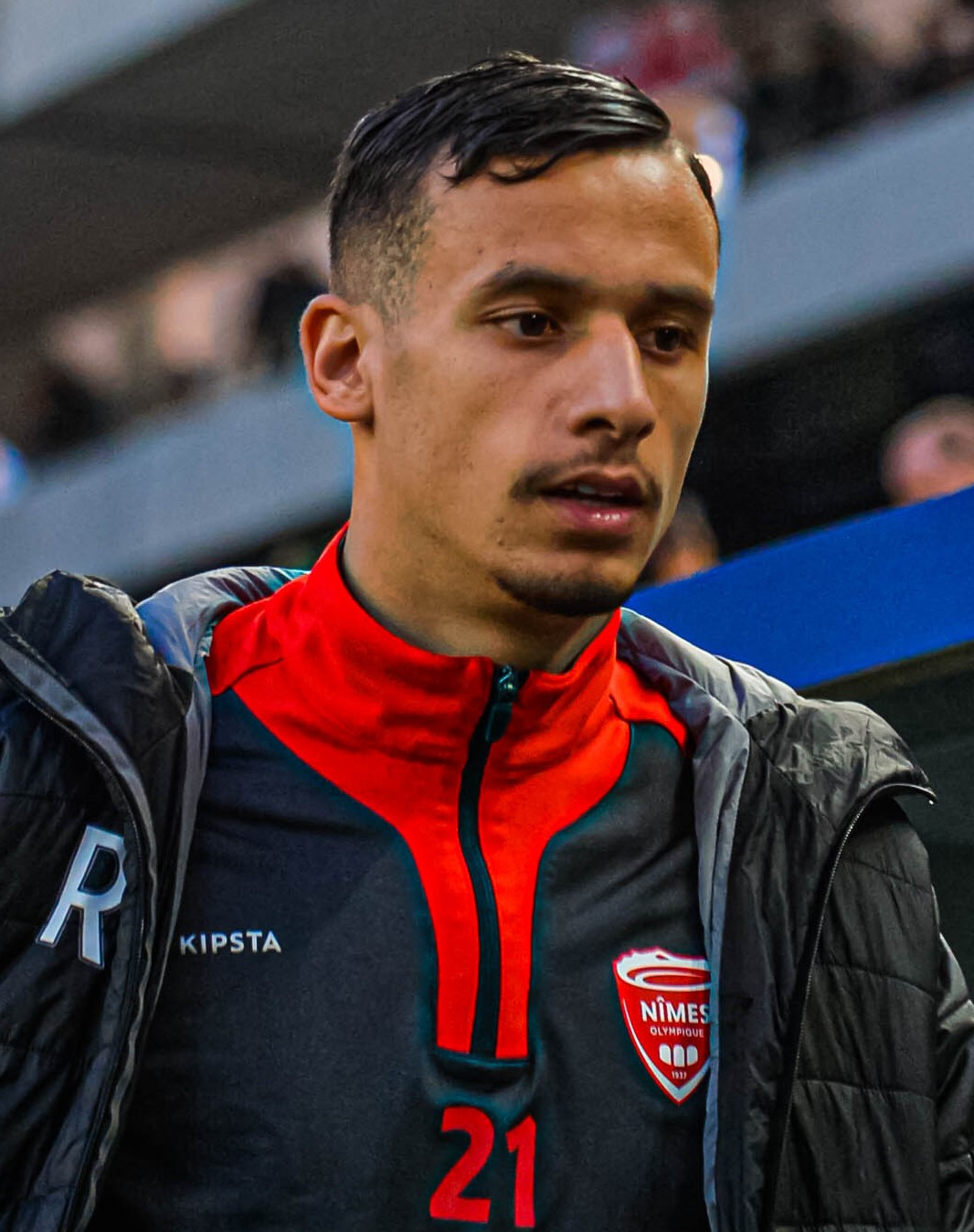

Personal information
- Full name: Mehdi Zerkane
- Date of birth: 15 July 1999 (age 27)
- Place of birth: Clermont-Ferrand, France
- Height: 1.86 m (6 ft 1 in)
- Position: Winger

Senior career*
Years	Team	Apps	(Gls)
2017–2019	Monaco B	16	(0)
2019–2020	Bordeaux B	12	(1)
2020–2022	Bordeaux	33	(1)
2022	→ OFI (loan)	0	(0)
2023	Nimes	5	(0)
2023	MC Alger	3	(0)

International career^{‡}
2020–	Algeria	1	(0)
- * Club domestic league appearances and goals as of 13:06, 11 November 2023 (UTC) ‡ National team caps and goals as of 16:06, 17 May 2021 (UTC)

Mehdi Zerkane (Arabic: مهدي زرقان; born 15 July 1999) is an Algerian professional footballer who plays as a winger. Born in France, he plays for the Algeria national team.

== Club career ==
=== Early career ===
Zerkane's youth deal with Monaco expired at the end of June 2020.

=== Bordeaux ===
He agreed a professional deal with Bordeaux soon after, signing a contract until 2022.

Zerkane made his debut for Bordeaux against Nantes on 21 August 2020, but was sent off for a foul on Nicolas Pallois in a 0–0 draw at the Matmut Atlantique under new coach Jean-Louis Gasset.

On 31 October 2022, he was released from the club after having his contract mutually terminated.

=== OFI (loan) ===
On 5 September 2022, Zerkane was loaned for one season with an option to buy to Greek club OFI. On 27 October 2022, his loan was cut short by OFI.

=== Nimes ===
On February 2, 2023, he signed a six-month contract with Ligue 2 side Nîmes Olympique.

=== MC Alger ===
On August 17, 2023, he signed a two-year contract with MC Alger.

== International career ==
Zerkane was born in France to an Algerian father and Moroccan mother. He debuted for the Algeria national team in a 3–1 2021 Africa Cup of Nations qualification win over Zimbabwe on 12 November 2020.
