= Issouf Sissokho =

Malian footballer (born 2002)

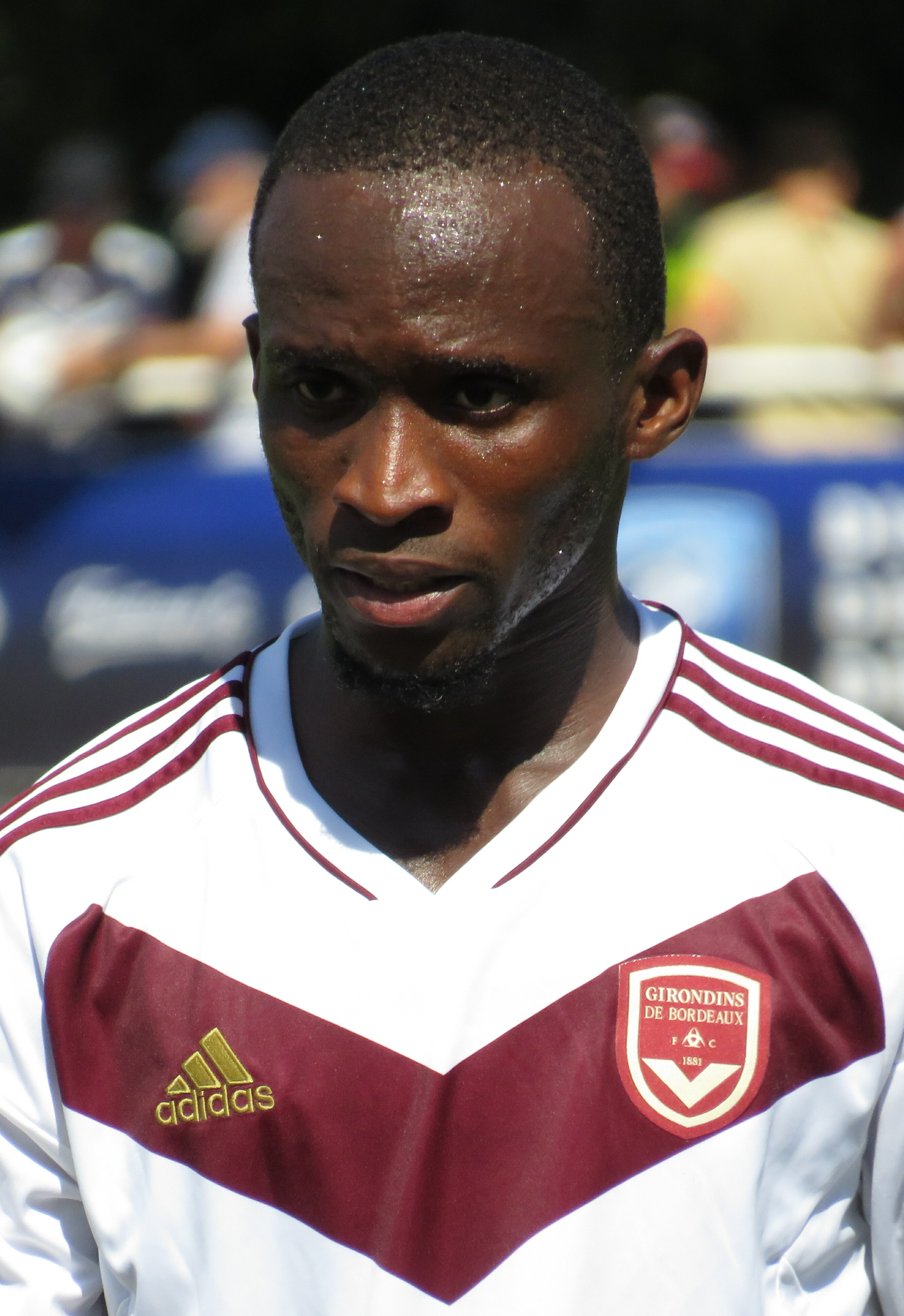

Personal information
- Full name: Issouf Bemba Sissokho
- Date of birth: 30 January 2002 (age 24)
- Place of birth: Bamako, Mali
- Height: 1.74 m (5 ft 9 in)
- Position: Midfielder

Team information
- Current team: Maccabi Tel Aviv
- Number: 28

Youth career
- Derby Académie

Senior career*
| Years | Team | Apps | (Gls) |
| 2020–2024 | Bordeaux B | 9 | (0) |
| 2021–2024 | Bordeaux | 58 | (1) |
| 2024– | Maccabi Tel Aviv | 55 | (0) |

International career^{‡}
| 2019 | Mali U20 | 6 | (0) |
- * Club domestic league appearances and goals as of 23 June 2026 ‡ National team caps and goals as of 00:37, 21 March 2021 (UTC)

Issouf Bemba Sissokho (born 30 January 2002) is a Malian professional footballer who plays as a midfielder for Israeli Premier League club Maccabi Tel Aviv.

== Club career ==
On 30 January 2020, Sissokho signed with a contract with Bordeaux. Sissokho made his professional debut with Bordeaux in a 2–1 Ligue 1 loss to Metz on 27 February 2021.

== International career ==
Sissokho represented the Mali U20s at the 2019 African Games.
