= Enock Kwateng =

French footballer (born 1997)

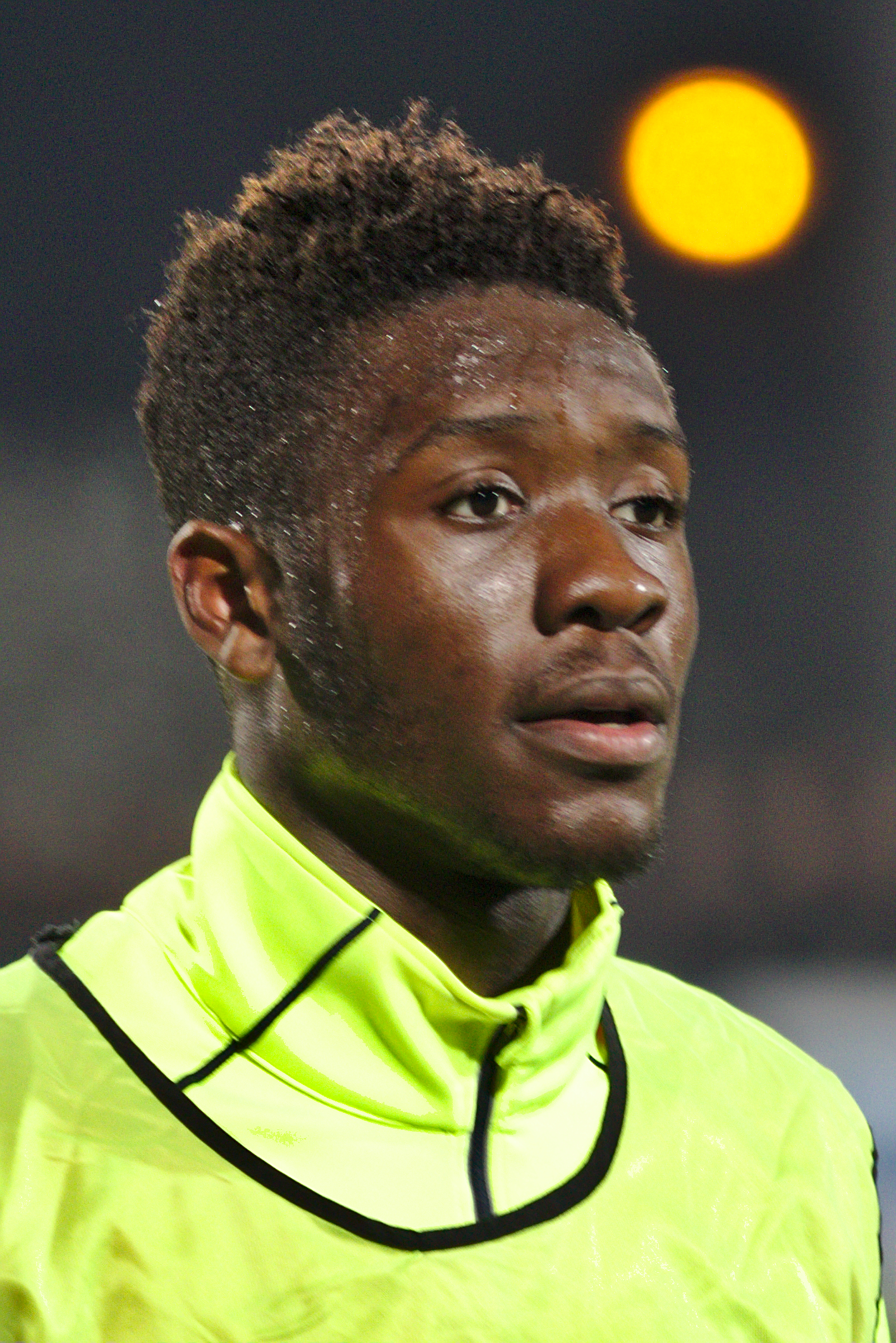
- Kwateng in 2015

Personal information
- Date of birth: 9 April 1997 (age 29)
- Place of birth: Mantes-la-Jolie, France
- Height: 1.81 m (5 ft 11 in)
- Position: Right-back

Youth career
- 2004–2012: Mantes
- 2012–2014: Nantes

Senior career*
Years	Team	Apps	(Gls)
2014–2018	Nantes B	45	(3)
2015–2019	Nantes	40	(0)
2019–2022	Bordeaux	61	(2)
2023–2024	Ankaragücü	0	(0)
2025–2026	Botev Plovdiv	23	(3)

International career
2013	France U16	7	(1)
2013	France U17	5	(1)
2014–2015	France U18	7	(0)
2015–2016	France U19	16	(0)
2016–2017	France U20	8	(0)
- * Club domestic league appearances and goals as of 11 June 2026

Enock Kwateng (born 9 April 1997) is a French professional footballer who plays as a right-back. He is France youth international, having represented the country from U16 to U20 levels.

== Club career ==
=== Nantes ===
Kwateng is a youth prospect of Nantes and eventually made his Ligue 1 first-team debut on 15 August 2015 against Angers in a 0–0 draw replacing Olivier Veigneau after 79 minutes.

=== Bordeaux ===
In June 2019, Kwateng agreed a four-year deal with league rivals Bordeaux. Due to the expiration of his Nantes contract he joined Bordeaux on a free transfer for the 2019–20 season.

=== Ankaragücü ===
On 14 February 2023, he signed a 1,5-year contract with Süper Lig club Ankaragücü.

== International career ==
Of Ghanaian descent, Kwateng has represented France at U16, U17, U18, U19, and U20 levels

== Honours ==
France U19

- UEFA European Under-19 Championship: 2016
