= Alexandre Lauray =

French footballer (born 1997)

Personal information
- Date of birth: 18 March 1997 (age 29)
- Place of birth: Les Sables-d'Olonne, France
- Height: 1.75 m (5 ft 9 in)
- Positions: Right-back; centre-back

Team information
- Current team: Le Mans
- Number: 8

Youth career
- 2011–2014: Toulouse

Senior career*
Years	Team	Apps	(Gls)
2014–2018	Toulouse II	39	(0)
2018–2021	Bordeaux II	18	(0)
2019–2021	Bordeaux	3	(0)
2019–2020	→ Dunkerque (loan)	20	(0)
2020–2021	→ Villefranche (loan)	27	(1)
2021–	Le Mans	104	(3)
- * Club domestic league appearances and goals as of 11 May 2026

Alexandre Lauray (born 18 March 1997) is a French professional footballer who plays as right-back or centre-back for Ligue 1 club Le Mans.

== Club career ==
Lauray joined the youth academy of Toulouse FC in 2011, and moved to Bordeaux in 2018. Lauray made his senior debut with Bordeaux in a 3–0 Ligue 1 loss to AS Saint-Étienne on 14 April 2019. In July 2019 he signed his first professional contract, for three years, with Bordeaux, and subsequently joined USL Dunkerque on loan until the end of the 2019–20 season. In September 2020 he was loaned to Villefranche for the 2020–21 season.

On 9 August 2021, he signed with Le Mans. He suffered a serious injury in a friendly in July 2022, sidelining him for an extended period.
