= 2023–24 FC Girondins de Bordeaux season =

FC Girondins de Bordeaux
2023–24 season
- Owner: Gérard López
- Chairman: Gérard López
- Manager: David Guion (until 7 October); Albert Riera (from 12 October)
- Stadium: Matmut Atlantique
- Ligue 2: 12th (administratively relegated)
- Coupe de France: Round of 32
- Top goalscorer: League: Žan Vipotnik (10); All: Žan Vipotnik (10)
- Average home league attendance: 21,545
Home colours	Away colours	Third colours

The 2023–24 season was the 142nd season in the existence of FC Girondins de Bordeaux and their second consecutive season in Ligue 2. They also competed in the Coupe de France.

== Players ==
=== First-team squad ===
As of 30 June 2024

Note: Flags indicate national team as defined under FIFA eligibility rules; some limited exceptions apply. Players may hold more than one non-FIFA nationality.

No.	Pos.	Nation	Player
1	GK	SWE	Karl Johnsson
4	DF	CMR	Malcom Bokele
5	DF	FRA	Yoann Barbet
6	MF	UKR	Danylo Ihnatenko
7	FW	FRA	Jérémy Livolant
8	MF	MLI	Issouf Sissokho
9	FW	SLO	Žan Vipotnik
10	MF	FRA	Gaétan Weissbeck (on loan from Sochaux)
11	MF	ROU	Alexi Pitu
13	GK	POL	Rafał Strączek
14	DF	COD	Vital N'Simba
17	FW	HON	Alberth Elis
18	DF	FRA	Emmanuel Biumla
19	DF	GAB	Jacques Ekomié
20	MF	ESP	Pedro Díaz
22	MF	FRA	Mathias De Amorim
24	DF	FRA	Jean Marcelin
26	MF	FRA	Emeric Depussay

No.	Pos.	Nation	Player
29	MF	BEN	Lenny Pirringuel
30	MF	GEO	Zuriko Davitashvili
33	FW	GAM	Nfansu Njie
34	DF	FRA	Clément Michelin
40	GK	FRA	Alane Bedfian
47	FW	FRA	Julien Vetro
72	MF	FRA	Yohan Cassubie
81	DF	FRA	Marvin De Lima
91	FW	FRA	David Tebili
97	GK	GLP	Davy Rouyard
99	GK	FRA	Grégoire Swiderski
—	DF	FRA	Mathys Angely
—	DF	ALG	Tijany Atallah
—	FW	FRA	Lucas Rocrou

== Transfers ==
=== Transfers in ===
Pos.	Player	Transferred from	Fee	Date	Source
MF	(Georgia (country)) Zuriko Davitashvili	(Georgia (country)) Dinamo Batumi	€1,250,000	1 July 2023	
FW	(Senegal) Aliou Badji	(France) Amiens	€3,000,000	3 July 2023	
DF	(France) Clément Michelin	(Greece) AEK Athens FC	€1,000,000	3 July 2023	
MF	(France) Yohan Cassubie	(France) Chamois Niortais FC	Free	4 July 2023	
FW	(Slovenia) Žan Vipotnik	(Slovenia) Maribor	€2,700,000	5 July 2023	
DF	(France) Jean Marcelin	AS Monaco FC	Free	13 July 2023	
FW	(France) Jérémy Livolant	(France) En Avant Guingamp	€1,250,000	27 July 2023	
MF	(Spain) Pedro Díaz	(Spain) Sporting de Gijón	€2,200,000	3 August 2023	
GK	(Sweden) Karl Johnsson	(Denmark) FC Copenhagen	Free	31 August 2023	

=== Loans in ===
Pos.	Player	Loan from	Fee	Date until	Source
MF	(France) Gaétan Weissbeck	(France) FC Sochaux-Montbéliard	Free	30 June 2024	

=== Loans out ===
Pos.	Player	Loan to	Fee	Date until	Source
MF	(France) Lenny Pirringuel	(France) Pau FC	Free	8 January 2024	
MF	(France) Logan Delaurier-Chaubet	(France) Quevilly-Rouen	Loan	30 June 2024	
MF	(France) Tom Lacoux	(Portugal) FC Famalicão	Loan	30 June 2024	
DF	(France) Johaneko Louis-Jean	(Spain) CD Lugo	Loan	30 June 2024	
FW	(Senegal) Aliou Badji	(Turkey) Gaziantep FK	Loan	30 June 2024	

=== Transfers out ===
Pos.	Player	Transferred to	Fee	Date	Source
MF	(Brazil) Fransérgio	(Brazil) Coritiba	Free	1 July 2023	
GK	(France) Gaëtan Poussin	(Spain) Real Zaragoza	Free	27 July 2023	
FW	(Nigeria) Josh Maja	(England) West Bromwich Albion FC	Free	1 August 2023	
DF	(France) Junior Mwanga	(France) RC Strasbourg Alsace	€10,000,000	8 August 2023	
FW	(France) Dilane Bakwa	(France) RC Strasbourg Alsace	€10,000,000	8 August 2023	
MF	(France) Rémi Oudin	(Italy) US Lecce	€1,000,000	28 August 2023	
DF	(Norway) Stian Gregersen	(United States) Atlanta United FC	€2,000,000	31 January 2024	

== Competitions ==
=== Overall record ===
Competition	First match	Last match	Starting round	Final position	Record							
Competition	First match	Last match	Starting round	Final position	Pld	W	D	L	GF	GA	GD	Win %
Ligue 2	7 August 2023	17 May 2024	Matchday 1	12th	38	14	9	15	50	52	−2	36.84
Coupe de France	17 November 2023	20 January 2024	Seventh round	Round of 32	4	1	2	1	5	5	+0	25.00
Total					42	15	11	16	55	57	−2	35.71

Source: Soccerway

=== Ligue 2 ===
==== League table ====
Pos	Team	Pld	W	D	L	GF	GA	GD	Pts	Promotion or Relegation
10	Pau	38	13	12	13	60	57	+3	51	
11	Grenoble	38	13	12	13	43	44	−1	51	
12	Bordeaux (D, R)	38	14	9	15	50	52	−2	50 (Note: Bordeaux were deducted 1 point due to federation decision.)	Demoted to National 2
13	Bastia	38	14	9	15	44	48	−4	50 (Note: Bastia were deducted 1 point due to federation decision.)	
14	Annecy	38	12	10	16	49	50	−1	46	

Updated to match(es) played on 17 May 2024. Source: Ligue 2
Rules for classification: 1) Points; 2) Goal difference; 3) Number of goals scored; 4) Head-to-head goal difference; 5) Fair play points
(D) Disqualified; (R) Relegated

==== Results summary ====
Overall								Home						Away					
Pld	W	D	L	GF	GA	GD	Pts	W	D	L	GF	GA	GD	W	D	L	GF	GA	GD
38	14	9	15	50	52	−2	51	10	5	4	31	19	+12	4	4	11	19	33	−14

Source: Ligue 2 BKT

==== Results by round ====
Round	1	2	3	4	5	6	7	8	9	10	11	12	13	14	15	16	17	18	19	20	21	22	23	24	25	26	27	28	29	30	31	32	33	34	35	36	37	38
Ground	A	H	A	H	H	A	H	A	A	H	A	H	A	H	A	H	A	H	A	A	H	H	A	H	A	H	A	H	A	H	A	H	A	H	A	H	A	H
Result	L	W	D	W	L	W	D	D	L	L	L	D	L	W	W	L	L	D	W	L	W	W	L	W	D	W	D	D	L	D	W	L	L	W	L	W	L	W
Position	20	13	15	7	12	7	11	12	13	13	15	15	17	16	13	15	17	17	13	15	13	13	13	13	13	13	13	13	13	12	12	13	14	14	14	12	13	13

Source: Ligue 2 BKT
A = Away; H = Home; W = Win; D = Draw; L = Loss

==== Matches ====
The league fixtures were unveiled on 29 June 2023.

7 August 2023 1	Pau	3–0	Bordeaux	Pau
20:45	Saivet 17'; George 19'; Ruiz (yellow card) 44'; Obiang (yellow card) 45+3'; Boutaïb 73'	Report	Vipotnik (penalty missed) 65'	Stadium: Nouste Camp; Referee: Karim Abed

14 August 2023 2	Bordeaux	1–0	Concarneau	Bordeaux
20:45 UTC+2	Cassubie (yellow card) 58'; Marcelin (yellow card) 63'; Barbet 90+8' (pen.)	Report	Chadli (yellow card) 34'	Stadium: Matmut Atlantique; Attendance: 24,574; Referee: Aurélien Petit

21 August 2023 3	Ajaccio	0–0	Bordeaux	Ajaccio
20:45		Report

26 August 2023 4	Bordeaux	2–0	Amiens	Bordeaux
15:00	Vipotnik 47'; Weissbeck 56'	Report		Stadium: Matmut Atlantique

2 September 2023 5	Bordeaux	2–4	Auxerre	Bordeaux
15:00	Díaz 26'; Elis 83'	Report	? 33' ? 36', 59' ? 56'	Stadium: Matmut Atlantique

16 September 2023 6	Valenciennes	1–2	Bordeaux	Valenciennes
19:00	? 63'	Report	Elis 37'; Pitu 88'

26 September 2023 8	Guingamp	0–0	Bordeaux	Guingamp
20:45		Report

30 September 2023 9	Grenoble	2–0	Bordeaux	Grenoble
19:00	? 15' ? 90+1'	Report

3 October 2023 7	Bordeaux	1–1	Caen	Bordeaux
18:45	Davitashvili 34'	Report	? 15'	Stadium: Matmut Atlantique; Attendance: 21,038

7 October 2023 10	Bordeaux	0–1	Laval	Bordeaux
15:00		Report	? 33'	Stadium: Matmut Atlantique; Attendance: 19,651

21 October 2023 11	Angers	2–0	Bordeaux	Angers
19:00	? 33' ? 60'	Report

28 October 2023 12	Bordeaux	2–2	Rodez	Bordeaux
15:00	Barbet 13' (pen.); Weissbeck 60'	Report	? 33' ? 79'	Stadium: Matmut Atlantique; Attendance: 30,098

4 November 2023 13	Bastia	3–1	Bordeaux	Furiani
19:00	? 9', 68' ? 18'	Report	Livolant 78'

11 November 2023 14	Bordeaux	3–1	Annecy	Bordeaux
15:00	Díaz 15'; Vipotnik 45+1', 58'	Report	? 30'	Stadium: Matmut Atlantique; Attendance: 18,631

25 November 2023 15	Paris FC	1–2	Bordeaux	Paris
19:00 CET (UTC+1)	Kebbal 12' (pen.)	Report	Weissbeck 7'; Barbet 90+3'	Stadium: Stade Sébastien Charléty; Attendance: 13,472; Referee: Abdelatif Kherradji

2 December 2023 16	Bordeaux	0–1	Troyes	Bordeaux
15:00			? 34'	Stadium: Matmut Atlantique

5 December 2023 17	Quevilly-Rouen	3–2	Bordeaux	Le Petit-Quevilly
20:45	Soumano 15'; Camara 19'; Sangaré (yellow card) 41'; Coulibaly 55'	Report	Weissbeck (red card) 57'; Pedro Díaz (yellow card) 64'; Elis 78' 88'	Stadium: Stade Robert Diochon; Attendance: 4,743; Referee: (France) Antoine Valnet

16 December 2023 18	Bordeaux	0–0	Saint-Étienne	Bordeaux
15:00 CET		Report	Briançon (yellow card) 6'; Monconduit (yellow card) 25'; Pétrot (yellow card) 77'	Stadium: Matmut Atlantique; Attendance: 37,658; Referee: (France) Romain Delpech

19 December 2023 19	Dunkerque	0–2	Bordeaux	Dunkirk
20:45 CET	Opa Sanganté (yellow card) 10'; Boissier (yellow card) 69'; Gambor (yellow card) 90+5'	Report	Vipotnik 4'; Ihnatenko (yellow card) 22'; Bokele (yellow card) 59'; Elis 70'	Stadium: Stade Marcel-Tribut; Attendance: 3,504; Referee: (France) Thierry Bouille

15 January 2024 20	Auxerre	3–1	Bordeaux	Auxerre
20:45 CET	Ayé 25' 88'; Ihnatenko 47' (o.g.)	Report	Vipotnik 45'; Ihnatenko (yellow card) 76'; Marcelin (yellow card) 79'; Weissbeck (yellow card) 85'	Stadium: Stade de l'Abbé-Deschamps; Attendance: 13,312; Referee: (France) Benoît Bastien

23 January 2024 21	Bordeaux	3–1	Valenciennes	Bordeaux
20:45 CET	Weissbeck (yellow card) 45+1'; Livolant (yellow card) 52'; Biumla 57'; Pedro Díaz 65'; Vipotnik 86'	Report	Foe-Ondoa (yellow card) 46'; Boutoutaou 80'	Stadium: Matmut Atlantique; Attendance: 15,467; Referee: (France) Mickaël Leleu

29 January 2024 22	Bordeaux	1–0	Angers	Bordeaux
20:45 CET	Davitashvili 70'			Stadium: Matmut Atlantique

3 February 2024 23	Troyes	2–1	Bordeaux	Troyes
20:00 CET	? 65' ? 90+3' (pen.)		Barbet 90' (pen.)	Stadium: Stade de l'Aube

10 February 2024 24	Bordeaux	1–0	Grenoble	Bordeaux
	Vipotnik 4'			Stadium: Matmut Atlantique

19 February 2024 25	Amiens	1–1	Bordeaux	Amiens
21:45	? 31'		Vetro 90+3'	Stadium: Stade de la Licorne

24 February 2024 26	Bordeaux	1–0	Guingamp	Bordeaux
	Vipotnik 40'			Stadium: Matmut Atlantique

2 March 2024 27	Rodez	2–2	Bordeaux	Rodez
20:00	? 26' ? 45+2'		Davitashvili 18'; Ihnatenko 90+4'	Stadium: Stade Paul-Lignon

9 March 2024 28	Bordeaux	0–0	Quevilly-Rouen	Bordeaux
				Stadium: Matmut Atlantique

16 March 2024 29	Annecy	3–1	Bordeaux	Annecy
20:00	? 8', 45+3' ? 65'		Livolant 40'	Stadium: Parc des Sports

30 March 2024 30	Bordeaux	3–3	Paris	Bordeaux
	Davitashvili 42'; Barbet 48'; Díaz 90'		? 34' ? 38' ? 52'	Stadium: Matmut Atlantique

6 April 2024 31	Caen	0–1	Bordeaux	Caen
20:00			Díaz 20'	Stadium: Stade Michel d'Ornano

13 April 2024 32	Bordeaux	2–3	Bastia	Bordeaux
	Davitashvili 44'; Livolant 46'		? 1', 25' ? 32'	Stadium: Matmut Atlantique

20 April 2024 33	Saint-Étienne	2–1	Bordeaux	Saint-Étienne
	? 90+1', 90+4'		Díaz 42'

23 April 2024 34	Bordeaux	2–0	Dunkerque	Bordeaux
	Vipotnik 38'; Davitashvili 46'			Stadium: Matmut Atlantique

27 April 2024 35	Laval	1–0	Bordeaux	Laval
	? 61'

4 May 2024 36	Bordeaux	4–0	Ajaccio	Bordeaux
	Díaz 6'; Davitashvili 28'; Barbet 87' (pen.); N'Simba 90+1'			Stadium: Matmut Atlantique

10 May 2024 37	Concarneau	4–2	Bordeaux	Concarneau
	? 37' ? 50', 72' ? 59'		Vipotnik 9'; Livolant 63'	Stadium: Stade Guy-Piriou

17 May 2024 38	Bordeaux	3–2	Pau	Bordeaux
20:45	Weissbeck 7'; Livolant 16'; Davitashvili 51'		? 46' ? 90+3'	Stadium: Matmut Atlantique

=== Coupe de France ===
17 November 2023 Seventh round	Canet Roussillon	1–1 (2–4 p)	Bordeaux	Perpignan
20:00	? 5'	Report	Cassubie 47'	Stadium: Stade Gilbert Brutus

9 December 2023 Eighth round	Angoulême	0–1	Bordeaux	Angoulême
14:00	Antoine Pierre Denis Letiévant (yellow card) 49'	Report	Marcelin 7'; Livolant (yellow card) 42'; Strączek (yellow card) 70'	Stadium: Stade Camille-Lebon; Attendance: 3,404; Referee: (France) Mikael Lesage

6 January 2024 Round of 64	Entente SSG	1–1 (2–4 p)	Bordeaux	Saint-Gratien
18:00 CET	El Hadji Dieye (yellow card) 6'; Sekou Baradji 18'; Yohann Somme (yellow card) 22'; Abdoulaye Sy (yellow card) 54'; Melamine Camara (yellow card) 89'	Report	Biumla (yellow card) 33'; Ihnatenko (yellow card) 45+1' (goal) 66'; Marcelin (yellow card) 89'	Stadium: Parc des Sports Michel Hidalgo; Attendance: 3,035; Referee: (France) Guillaume Paradis

20 January 2024 Round of 32	Bordeaux	2–3	Nice	Bordeaux
17:30 CET	Livolant 59'; Weissbeck 76'	Report	Guessand 35'; Todibo (yellow card) 45'; Sanson 47' (pen.) 60'; Rosario (yellow card) 71'; Bułka (yellow card) 90+2'	Stadium: Matmut Atlantique; Attendance: 22,960; Referee: (France) Thomas Léonard

== Statistics ==
=== Appearances and goals ===
Players with no appearances are not included on the list.

As of match played 17 May 2024

No.	Pos	Nat	Player	Total		Ligue 2		Coupe de France	
No.	Pos	Nat	Player	Apps	Goals	Apps	Goals	Apps	Goals
5	DF	(France) FRA	Barbet	0	6	0	6	0	0
6	MF	(Ukraine) UKR	Ihnatenko	0	2	0	1	0	1
7	FW	(France) FRA	Livolant	0	6	0	5	0	1
9	FW	(Slovenia) SLO	Vipotnik	0	10	0	10	0	0
10	MF	(France) FRA	Weissbeck	0	5	0	4	0	1
11	MF	(Romania) ROU	Pitu	0	1	0	1	0	0
14	DF	(Democratic Republic of the Congo) COD	N'Simba	0	1	0	1	0	0
17	FW	(Honduras) HON	Elis	0	5	0	5	0	0
18	DF	(France) FRA	Biumla	0	1	0	1	0	0
20	MF	(Spain) ESP	Díaz	0	7	0	7	0	0
24	DF	(France) FRA	Marcelin	0	1	0	0	0	1
30	MF	(Georgia (country)) GEO	Davitashvili	0	8	0	8	0	0
47	FW	(France) FRA	Vetro	0	1	0	1	0	0
72	MF	(France) FRA	Cassubie	0	1	0	0	0	1
Players sold, released or loaned out during the season:
