= 2022–23 FC Girondins de Bordeaux season =

FC Girondins de Bordeaux
2022–23 season
- Owner: Gérard López
- President: Gérard López
- Head coach: David Guion
- Stadium: Matmut Atlantique
- Ligue 2: 3rd
- Coupe de France: Round of 64
- Top goalscorer: League: Josh Maja (16); All: Josh Maja (17)
| Home colours | Away colours | Third colours |

The 2022–23 season was the 141st season in the existence of FC Girondins de Bordeaux and the club's first season back in the second division of French football since 1991. In addition to the domestic league, Bordeaux participated in this season's edition of the Coupe de France.

== Players ==
=== First-team squad ===
As of 26 January 2023

Note: Flags indicate national team as defined under FIFA eligibility rules; some limited exceptions apply. Players may hold more than one non-FIFA nationality.

| No. | Pos. | Nation | Player |
|---|---|---|---|
| 2 | DF | NOR | Stian Rode Gregersen |
| 3 | DF | FRA | Johaneko Louis-Jean |
| 4 | DF | CMR | Malcom Bokele |
| 5 | DF | FRA | Yoann Barbet |
| 6 | MF | UKR | Danylo Ihnatenko |
| 7 | FW | FRA | Dilane Bakwa |
| 8 | MF | MLI | Issouf Sissokho |
| 10 | FW | SEN | Aliou Badji (on loan from Amiens) |
| 11 | FW | NGR | Josh Maja |
| 13 | MF | BRA | Fransérgio |
| 14 | DF | COD | Vital N'Simba |
| 16 | GK | FRA | Gaëtan Poussin |
| 17 | MF | FRA | Lenny Pirringuel |
| 19 | DF | GAB | Jacques Ekomié |

| No. | Pos. | Nation | Player |
|---|---|---|---|
| 20 | FW | FRA | Julien Vetro |
| 22 | MF | FRA | Logan Delaurier-Chaubet |
| 23 | DF | FRA | Junior Mwanga |
| 26 | MF | FRA | Emeric Depussay |
| 27 | MF | FRA | Tom Lacoux |
| 29 | FW | HON | Alberth Elis |
| 30 | MF | GEO | Zuriko Davitashvili (on loan from Dinamo Batumi) |
| 31 | GK | POL | Rafał Strączek |
| 34 | DF | FRA | Clément Michelin (on loan from AEK Athens) |
| 80 | MF | ROU | Alexi Pitu |
| 81 | DF | FRA | Marvin De Lima |
| 97 | FW | FRA | Lucas Rocrou |
| 98 | DF | ALG | Tijany Atallah |
| 99 | GK | FRA | Grégoire Swiderski |

=== Out on loan ===
Note: Flags indicate national team as defined under FIFA eligibility rules; some limited exceptions apply. Players may hold more than one non-FIFA nationality.

| No. / Pos. / Nation / Player; — / MF / ALG / Mehdi Zerkane (at OFI until 30 June 2023) | No. / Pos. / Nation / Player; — / FW / FRA / Rémi Oudin (at Lecce until 30 June 2023) |

== Transfers ==
=== In ===
| No. | Pos. | Player | Transferred from | Fee | Date | Source |
|---|---|---|---|---|---|---|
| | FW | (Senegal) Aliou Badji | (France) Amiens | Loan | 31 August 2022 | |

=== Out ===
| No. | Pos. | Player | Transferred to | Fee | Date | Source |

== Pre-season and friendlies ==
Win Draw Loss Fixtures

| 6 July 2022 Friendly | Bordeaux (France) | 2–1 | (France) Rodez | Agen, France |
| 18:00 CEST (UTC+2) | Delaurier-Chaubet 4'; Mwanga 45' | Report | David 53' | Stadium: Stade Pierre-Fernandez |

| 9 July 2022 Friendly | Trélissac (France) | 0–3 | (France) Bordeaux | Trélissac, France |
| 19:00 CEST (UTC+2) | | Report | Delaurier-Chaubet 53'; Sissokho 57'; Makagni 85' | Stadium: Stade Firmin-Daudou |

| 16 July 2022 Friendly | Orléans (France) | 2–1 | (France) Bordeaux | Orléans, France |
| 18:00 CEST (UTC+2) | Louis-Jean 31'; Dabasse 38' | Report | Ekomié 81' | Stadium: Stade de la Source |

| 20 July 2022 Friendly | Saint-Étienne (France) | 1–1 | (France) Bordeaux | Vichy, France |
| 19:00 CEST (UTC+2) | Bouanga 90+1' (pen.) | Report | Delaurier-Chaubet 24' | Stadium: Stade Louis-Darragon |

| 22 September 2022 Friendly | Bordeaux (France) | 2–3 | (France) Clermont | Limoges, France |
| 18:00 CEST (UTC+2) | Maja 45'; Bakwa 60' | | Magnin 21'; Andrić 41', 90' | Stadium: Stade de Beaublanc |

| 10 December 2022 Friendly | Brentford (England) | 1–2 | (France) Bordeaux | Riudarenes, Spain |
| 13:30 CET (UTC+1) | Gilbert 8' | | Davitashvili 18'; Maja (pen.) | Stadium: Campo Municipal Riudarenes; Attendance: 0 |

| 16 December 2022 Friendly | Boavista (Portugal) | 0–2 | (France) Bordeaux | Vila Real de Santo António, Portugal |
| 16:30 CET (UTC+1) | | | | Stadium: Complexo Desportivo de VRSA |

| 20 December 2022 Friendly | Niort (France) | 5–3 | (France) Bordeaux | Niort, France |
| 15:30 CET (UTC+1) | | | | Stadium: Stade René Gaillard |

== Competitions ==
=== Overall record ===
| Competition | First match | Last match | Starting round | Final position | Record | | | | | | | |
| Competition | First match | Last match | Starting round | Final position | Pld | W | D | L | GF | GA | GD | Win % |
|---|---|---|---|---|---|---|---|---|---|---|---|---|
| Ligue 2 | 30 July 2022 | 2 June 2023 | Matchday 1 | | 35 | 19 | 9 | 7 | 48 | 26 | +22 | 54.29 |
| Coupe de France | 29 October 2022 | 7 January 2023 | Seventh round | Round of 64 | 3 | 2 | 0 | 1 | 7 | 3 | +4 | 66.67 |
| Total | | | | | 38 | 21 | 9 | 8 | 55 | 29 | +26 | 55.26 |

Last updated: 6 May 2023
Source: Soccerway

=== Ligue 2 ===
==== League table ====
| Pos | Team | Pld | W | D | L | GF | GA | GD | Pts | Promotion or Relegation |
|---|---|---|---|---|---|---|---|---|---|---|
| 1 | Le Havre (C, P) | 38 | 20 | 15 | 3 | 46 | 19 | +27 | 75 | Promotion to Ligue 1 |
| 2 | Metz (P) | 38 | 20 | 12 | 6 | 61 | 33 | +28 | 72 | Promotion to Ligue 1 |
| 3 | Bordeaux | 38 | 20 | 9 | 9 | 51 | 28 | +23 | 69 | |
| 4 | Bastia | 38 | 17 | 9 | 12 | 52 | 45 | +7 | 60 | |
| 5 | Caen | 38 | 16 | 11 | 11 | 52 | 43 | +9 | 59 | |

Source: Ligue 2
Rules for classification: 1) Points; 2) Goal difference; 3) Number of goals scored; 4) Head-to-head goal difference; 5) Fair play points
(C) Champions; (P) Promoted

==== Results summary ====
| Overall | | | | | | | | Home | | | | | | Away | | | | | |
| Pld | W | D | L | GF | GA | GD | Pts | W | D | L | GF | GA | GD | W | D | L | GF | GA | GD |
|---|---|---|---|---|---|---|---|---|---|---|---|---|---|---|---|---|---|---|---|
| 17 | 9 | 4 | 4 | 22 | 11 | +11 | 31 | 6 | 2 | 1 | 13 | 4 | +9 | 3 | 2 | 3 | 9 | 7 | +2 |

Last updated: 30 December 2022.
Source: Ligue 2

==== Results by round ====
| Round | 1 | 2 | 3 | 4 | 5 | 6 | 7 | 8 | 9 | 10 | 11 | 12 | 13 | 14 | 15 | 16 | 17 |
|---|---|---|---|---|---|---|---|---|---|---|---|---|---|---|---|---|---|
| Ground | H | A | H | H | A | H | A | A | H | A | H | A | H | A | H | A | H |
| Result | D | W | W | D | L | W | W | L | W | W | W | D | W | L | D | L | W |
| Position | 12 | 3 | 2 | 3 | 5 | 2 | 1 | 4 | 3 | 1 | 1 | 1 | 1 | 2 | 2 | 3 | 2 |

Updated to match(es) played on 30 December 2022. Source: Ligue 2
A = Away; H = Home; W = Win; D = Draw; L = Loss

==== Matches ====
The league fixtures were announced on 17 June 2022.

| 30 July 2022 1 | Bordeaux | 0–0 | Valenciennes | Bordeaux |
| 19:00 CEST (UTC+2) | | Report | | Stadium: Matmut Atlantique; Attendance: 19,279; Referee: Benjamin Lepaysant |

| 6 August 2022 2 | Rodez | 0–3 | Bordeaux | Rodez |
| 19:00 CEST (UTC+2) | | Report | Ihnatenko 4'; Bakwa 14'; De Lima 90+4' | Stadium: Stade Paul-Lignon; Attendance: 1,565; Referee: Ruddy Buquet |

| 13 August 2022 3 | Bordeaux | 1–0 | Niort | Bordeaux |
| 19:00 CEST (UTC+2) | Delaurier-Chaubet 61' | Report | | Stadium: Matmut Atlantique; Attendance: 20,709; Referee: Gaël Angoula |

| 22 August 2022 4 | Grenoble | 0–0 | Bordeaux | Rodez |
| 20:45 CEST (UTC+2) | | Report | | Stadium: Stade des Alpes; Attendance: 8,092; Referee: Mikael Lesage |

| 27 August 2022 5 | Bordeaux | 0–1 | Guingamp | Bordeaux |
| 15:00 CEST (UTC+2) | | Report | Livolant 6' | Stadium: Matmut Atlantique; Attendance: 17,609; Referee: Aurélien Petit |

| 30 August 2022 6 | Bordeaux | 4–0 | Quevilly-Rouen | Bordeaux |
| 20:45 CEST (UTC+2) | Maja 7' (pen.); Pendant 21' (o.g.); Bakwa 41'; Delaurier-Chaubet 75' | Report | | Stadium: Matmut Atlantique; Attendance: 15,383; Referee: Guillaume Paradis |

| 3 September 2022 7 | Paris FC | 1–3 | Bordeaux | Paris |
| 15:00 CEST (UTC+2) | Guilavogui 78' | Report | Maja 13', 19' (pen.), 51' (pen.) | Stadium: Stade Sébastien Charléty; Attendance: 10,112; Referee: Jérémie Pignard |

| 10 September 2022 8 | Saint-Étienne | 2–0 | Bordeaux | Saint-Étienne |
| 15:00 CEST (UTC+2) | Pétrot (yellow card) 17'; Giraudon (yellow card) 30'; Wadji 35'; Maçon 67'; Cafaro (yellow card) 74' | Report | Barbet (yellow card) 26'; Lacoux (yellow card) 44' | Stadium: Stade Geoffroy-Guichard; Referee: (France) Romain Lissorgue |

| 17 September 2022 9 | Bordeaux | 2–1 | Dijon | Bordeaux |
| 15:00 CEST (UTC+2) | Maja 8' (pen.); Ihnatenko (yellow card) 11'; Bakwa (yellow card) 52'; Davitashvili 87' | Report | Le Bihan 71'; Jacob (yellow card) 79' | Stadium: Matmut Atlantique; Attendance: 17,323; Referee: (France) Hakim Ben El Hadj |

| 3 October 2022 10 | Laval | 1–2 | Bordeaux | Laval |
| 20:45 CEST (UTC+2) | Maggiotti 56'; Mouali (yellow card) 88'; Durbant (yellow card) 90+3'; Gonçalves (yellow card) 90+4' | Report | Maja 5'; Ihnatenko (yellow card) 53'; Elis 69'; N'Simba (yellow card) 90+4' | Stadium: Stade Francis Le Basser; Attendance: 8,546; Referee: (France) Alexandre Perreau Niel |

| 8 October 2022 11 | Bordeaux | 2–0 | Metz | Bordeaux |
| 15:00 CEST (UTC+2) | Fransérgio (yellow card) 43' (goal) 90+2'; Maja 45+2' (pen.); Michelin (yellow card) 68' | Report | Maïga (yellow card) 27' | Stadium: Matmut Atlantique; Attendance: 19,266; Referee: (France) Pierre Legat |

| 17 October 2022 12 | Bastia | 1–1 | Bordeaux | Furiani |
| 20:45 CEST (UTC+2) | Kaïboué (yellow card) 39'; Magri (yellow card) 54'; Sainati (yellow card) 87'; Van Den Kerkhof 90+4' | Report | Ihnatenko (yellow card) 54' (goal) 83' | Stadium: Stade Armand-Cesari; Attendance: 12,000; Referee: (France) Nicolas Rainville |

| 22 October 2022 13 | Bordeaux | 1–0 | Annecy | Bordeaux |
| 19:00 CET (UTC+1) | Bakwa 22'; N'Simba (yellow card) 33'; Ihnatenko (yellow card) 71'; Badji (yellow card) 84' | Report | Temanfo (yellow card) 74'; Demoncy (yellow card) 90+6' | Stadium: Matmut Atlantique; Attendance: 17,217; Referee: (France) Faouzi Benchabane |

| 5 November 2022 14 | Nîmes | 1–0 | Bordeaux | Nîmes |
| 15:00 CET (UTC+1) | N'Guessan 6' (yellow card) 51'; Djiga (yellow card) 74' | Report | Lacoux (yellow card) 44'; N'Simba (yellow card) 84' | Stadium: Stade des Costières; Attendance: 9,462; Referee: (France) Aurélien Petit |

| 12 November 2022 15 | Bordeaux | 1–1 | Pau | Bordeaux |
| 19:00 CET (UTC+1) | Pirringuel 87'; Barbet (yellow card) 89'; Lacoux (yellow card) 89'; Maja (yellow card) 90+4' | Report | Bassouamina 23'; Evans (yellow card) 27' | Stadium: Matmut Atlantique; Attendance: 24,732; Referee: (France) Romain Lissorgue |

| 26 December 2022 16 | Le Havre | 1–0 | Bordeaux | Le Havre |
| 19:00 CET (UTC+1) | Rchardson 9'; Cornette (yellow card) 14' (yellow-red card) 67'; Sangante (yellow card) 45'; Thiaré (yellow card) 69' | Report | Gregersen (yellow card) 38'; Ihnatenko (yellow card) 77' | Stadium: Stade Océane; Attendance: 23,055; Referee: (France) Guillaume Paradis |

| 30 December 2022 17 | Bordeaux | 2–1 | Sochaux | Bordeaux |
| 17:00 CET (UTC+1) | Maja 30'; Davitashvili 32'; Bakwa (yellow card) 62'; Delaurier-Chaubet (red card) 74' | Report | Kanouté 59'; Yatabaré (yellow card) 81'; Do Couto (yellow card) 90+2'; Prévot (yellow card) 90+3' | Stadium: Matmut Atlantique; Attendance: 22,363; Referee: (France) Abdelatif Kherradji |

| 10 January 2023 18 | Caen | 2–2 | Bordeaux | Caen |
| 20:45 CET (UTC+1) | Thomas (yellow card) 23'; Mendy 51'; Abdi 81'; Vandermersch (yellow card) 86'; Court (red card) 87' | Report | Maja 3', 24'; Michelin (yellow card) 38' (red card) 67'; Ihnatenko (yellow card) 53'; Barbet (yellow card) 68'; Elis (yellow card) 87'; Bakwa (yellow card) 90' | Stadium: Stade Michel d'Ornano; Attendance: 15,554; Referee: Romain Lissorgue |

| 13 January 2023 19 | Bordeaux | 1–1 | Amiens | Bordeaux |
| 20:45 CET (UTC+1) | Maja (penalty scored) 42'; Fransérgio (yellow card) 58' | Report | Opoku (yellow card) 21'; Ilenikhena 90+2' | Stadium: Matmut Atlantique; Attendance: 14,934; Referee: Stéphanie Frappart |

| 28 January 2023 20 | Dijon | 0–3 | Bordeaux | Dijon |
| 19:00 CET (UTC+1) | Joly (yellow card) 29'; Traoré (yellow card) 70' | Report | Barbet 12', 56'; Bakwa 60' | Stadium: Stade Gaston Gérard; Attendance: 7,428; Referee: Benjamin Lepaysant |

| 31 January 2023 21 | Bordeaux | 1–2 | Le Havre | Bordeaux |
| 20:45 CET (UTC+1) | Lacoux (yellow card) 36'; Barbet (yellow card) 38'; N'Simba 55'; Badji (yellow card) 84' | Report | Casimir 15'; Opéri (yellow card) 54'; El Hajjam 77'; Sangante (yellow card) 84'; Mahmoud (yellow card) 90+2' | Stadium: Matmut Atlantique; Attendance: 20,569; Referee: Mikael Lesage |

| 3 February 2023 22 | Pau | 0–2 | Bordeaux | Pau |
| 20:45 CET (UTC+1) | Sylvestre (yellow card) 24' | Report | Fransérgio (yellow card) 13'; Bokele 33'; Bakwa (yellow card) 53'; Badji 67' | Stadium: Nouste Camp; Attendance: 3,821; Referee: Antoine Valnet |

| 11 February 2023 23 | Niort | 3–1 | Bourdeaux | Niort |
| 20:45 CET (UTC+1) | Boutobba (yellow card) 15'; Zemzemi 28'; Passi 45+2'; Olaitan 90+4', (yellow card) 90+5' | Report | Badji 30'; Ihnatenko (yellow card) 45+1' | Stadium: Stade René Gaillard; Attendance: 5,446; Referee: Aurélien Petit |

| 18 February 2023 24 | Bordeaux | 2–1 | Paris FC | Bordeaux |
| 15:00 CET (UTC+1) | Bokele 24'; Barbet (penalty scored) 32' | Report | Maçon (yellow card) 26'; Boutaïb (yellow card) 30'; López 72'; Chergui (yellow card) 90+2'; Bernauer (yellow card) 90+3'; Guilavogui (yellow card) 90+6' | Stadium: Matmut Atlantique; Attendance: 17,439; Referee: Guillaume Paradis |

| 25 February 2023 25 | Amiens | 1–2 | Bordeaux | Amiens |
| 20:45 CET (UTC+1) | Cissé 17'; Mendy (yellow card) 66' | Report | Ihnatenko (yellow card) 37'; Badji 79'; Fransérgio 90+1' | Stadium: Stade de la Licorne; Attendance: 8,002; Referee: Alexandre Perreau Niel |

| 4 March 2023 26 | Bordeaux | 1–1 | Saint-Étienne | Bordeaux |
| 15:00 CET (UTC+1) | Badji 46' | Report | Pétrot (yellow card) 37'; Krasso (yellow card) 52', (penalty scored) 82'; Monconduit (yellow card) 85' | Stadium: Matmut Atlantique; Attendance: 29,906; Referee: Nicolas Rainville |

| 11 March 2023 27 | Sochaux | 1–1 | Bordeaux | Montbéliard |
| 15:00 CET (UTC+1) | Weissbeck 40'; Doumbia (yellow card) 63'; Aaneba (yellow card) 90+4' | Report | Bakwa 30'; N'Simba (yellow card) 75'; Badji (yellow card) 90+4' | Stadium: Stade Auguste Bonal; Attendance: 18,835; Referee: Benjamin Lepaysant |

| 18 March 2023 28 | Bordeaux | 1–0 | Nîmes | Bordeaux |
| 19:00 CET (UTC+1) | Barbet (yellow card) 58'; Maja 81' | Report | Burner (yellow card) 19' | Stadium: Matmut Atlantique; Attendance: 15,856; Referee: Romain Lissorgue |

| 3 April 2023 29 | Guingamp | 0–1 | Bordeaux | Guingamp |
| 20:45 CET (UTC+1) | Gaudin (yellow card) 54' | Report | Fransérgio 21'; Gregersen (yellow card) 58'; Barbet (yellow card) 60'; Bokele (yellow card) 74' | Stadium: Stade de Roudourou; Attendance: 9,533; Referee: Antoine Valnet |

| 8 April 2023 30 | Bordeaux | 2–0 | Bastia | Bordeaux |
| 15:00 CEST (UTC+2) | Ihnatenko (yellow card) 36'; Maja (penalty scored) 37', (yellow card) 78'; Fransérgio 48', (yellow card) 85'; Bokele (red card) 90'; Davitashvili (yellow card) 90+4' | Report | Kaïboué (yellow card) 36'; Ndiaye (yellow card) 72'; Alfarela (red card) 90'; Placide (yellow card) 90+2' | Stadium: Matmut Atlantique; Attendance: 30,099; Referee: Jérôme Brisard |

| 15 April 2023 31 | Metz | 3–0 | Bordeaux | Metz |
| 15:00 CEST (UTC+2) | Jallow 49'; Mikautadze 52', 72'; Jean Jacques (yellow card) 53' | Report | Poussin (red card) 40' | Stadium: Stade Saint-Symphorien; Attendance: 23,345; Referee: Gaël Angoula |

| 24 April 2023 32 | Bordeaux | 3–0 | Grenoble | Bordeaux |
| 20:45 CEST (UTC+2) | Davitashvili 57'; Maja 42', 64' | Report | Touray (yellow card) 60' | Stadium: Matmut Atlantique; Attendance: 17,731; Referee: Abdelatif Kherradji |

| 29 April 2023 33 | Valenciennes | 0–2 | Bordeaux | Valenciennes |
| 19:00 CEST (UTC+2) | Poha (yellow card) 39' | Report | Maja (yellow card) 32', (goal) 82'; Barbet 69' | Stadium: Stade Nungesser; Attendance: 9,477; Referee: Antoine Valnet |

| 6 May 2023 34 | Bordeaux | 1–0 | Caen | Bordeaux |
| 15:00 CEST (UTC+2) | Davistashvili 16' | Report | Mbock (yellow card) 14'; Diani (yellow card) 89' | Stadium: Matmut Atlantique; Attendance: 27,061; Referee: Mathieu Vernice |

| 13 May 2023 35 | Quevilly-Rouen | 0–0 | Bordeaux | Rouen |
| 19:00 CEST (UTC+2) | Cissokho (yellow card) 5'; Sissoko (yellow card) 90+4' | Report | Bokele (yellow card) 45+1' | Stadium: Stade Robert Diochon; Attendance: 7,113; Referee: Benjamin Lepaysant |

| 20 May 2023 36 | Bordeaux | 3–0 | Laval | Bordeaux |
| 14:45 CEST (UTC+2) | Barbet 4'; Davistashvili 32'; Maja (penalty missed) 45', (penalty missed) 45+3'; Gregersen 49'; Fransérgio (yellow card) 84' | Report | Bobichon (yellow card) 48'; Adéoti (yellow card) 78' | Stadium: Matmut Atlantique; Attendance: 25,331; Referee: Romain Lissorgue |

| 26 May 2023 37 | Annecy | 1–0 | Bordeaux | Annecy |
| 20:45 CEST (UTC+2) | Pajot 9', (yellow card) 32'; Demoncy (yellow card) 55'; Escales (yellow card) 84' | Report | Bakwa (yellow card) 50'; Mwanga (yellow card) 71'; Badji (yellow card) 83' | Stadium: Parc des Sports; Attendance: 12,705; Referee: Abdelatif Kherradji |

| 2 June 2023 38 | Bordeaux | 0–1 | Rodez | Bordeaux |
| 13:45 CEST (UTC+2) | | Report | Buadés 22' | Stadium: Matmut Atlantique; Attendance: 41,591; Referee: Nicolas Rainville |
Note: Match suspended following a pitch invasion after the 22nd minute goal and the win was awarded to Rodez.

=== Coupe de France ===
| 29 October 2022 Round 7 | Stade Bordelais | 0–3 | Bordeaux | Le Bouscat |
| 20:00 CET | Hugo Demory (yellow card) 45'; Jonathan Abonckelet (yellow card) 52' | Report | Badji (yellow card) 33'; Lacoux (yellow card) 51'; Davitashvili 54' (pen.); Barbet 72'; Delaurier-Chaubet 84' | Stadium: Stade Sainte Germaine; Attendance: 3,535; Referee: (France) Romain Delpech |

| 19 November 2022 Round 8 | Trélissac | 2–3 | Bordeaux | Périgueux |
| 20:00 CET | Joris Gouache 28'; Adama Diakité 30' (yellow card) 53' | Report | Sissokho (yellow card) 27'; Delaurier-Chaubet (yellow card) 45+2'; Badji (yellow card) 50' (goal) 63'; Barbet 62' 90+3' | Stadium: Stade Francis-Rongiéras; Attendance: 2,899; Referee: (France) Azzedine Souifi |

| 7 January 2023 Round Of 64 | Bordeaux | 1–2 | Rennes | Bordeaux |
| 20:45 CET | Maja 45+2' | Report | Bourigeaud 23'; Doku 53' | Stadium: Nouveau Stade de Bordeaux; Referee: Pierre Gaillouste |
