= 2020–21 Fulham F.C. season =

Fulham
2020–21 season
- Owner: Shahid Khan
- Chairman: Shahid Khan
- Head coach: Scott Parker
- Stadium: Craven Cottage
- Premier League: 18th (relegated)
- FA Cup: Fourth round
- EFL Cup: Fourth round
- Top goalscorer: League: Bobby Decordova-Reid (5); All: Bobby Decordova-Reid (7)
Home colours	Away colours	Third colours

The 2020–21 Fulham F.C. season was the club's 123rd season in existence and the first season back in the top flight of English football. In addition to the domestic league, Fulham participated in this season's editions of the FA Cup and the EFL Cup.

== Players ==
=== Current squad ===
As of 2 February 2021

Note: Flags indicate national team as defined under FIFA eligibility rules; some limited exceptions apply. Players may hold more than one non-FIFA nationality.

No.	Pos.	Nation	Player
1	GK	FRA	Alphonse Areola (on loan from Paris Saint-Germain)
2	DF	NED	Kenny Tete
3	DF	JAM	Michael Hector
4	DF	BEL	Denis Odoi
5	DF	DEN	Joachim Andersen (on loan from Olympique Lyonnais)
6	MF	SCO	Kevin McDonald
9	FW	SRB	Aleksandar Mitrović
10	MF	SCO	Tom Cairney (captain)
12	GK	SVK	Marek Rodák
13	DF	USA	Tim Ream
14	FW	JAM	Bobby Decordova-Reid
15	MF	ENG	Ruben Loftus-Cheek (on loan from Chelsea)
16	DF	ENG	Tosin Adarabioyo

No.	Pos.	Nation	Player
17	FW	POR	Ivan Cavaleiro
18	MF	GAB	Mario Lemina (on loan from Southampton)
19	MF	ENG	Ademola Lookman (on loan from RB Leipzig)
21	MF	ENG	Harrison Reed
23	DF	ENG	Joe Bryan
25	MF	ENG	Josh Onomah
27	FW	NGR	Josh Maja (on loan from Bordeaux)
29	MF	CMR	André-Frank Zambo Anguissa
30	DF	NED	Terence Kongolo
31	GK	ESP	Fabri
33	DF	USA	Antonee Robinson
34	DF	NGR	Ola Aina (on loan from Torino)

== Transfers ==
=== Transfers in ===
Date from	Position	Nationality	Name	From	Fee	Ref.
20 August 2020	LB	(United States)	Antonee Robinson	(England) Wigan Athletic	£2,000,000	
30 August 2020	DM	(England)	Harrison Reed	(England) Southampton	£6,000,000	
10 September 2020	RB	(Netherlands)	Kenny Tete	(France) Lyon	£3,000,000	
5 October 2020	CB	(England)	Tosin Adarabioyo	(England) Manchester City	£2,000,000	
16 October 2020	CB	(Netherlands)	Terence Kongolo	(England) Huddersfield Town	£4,000,000	

=== Loans in ===
Date from	Position	Nationality	Name	From	Date until	Ref.
30 August 2020	DM	(Gabon)	Mario Lemina	(England) Southampton	31 May 2021	
9 September 2020	GK	(France)	Alphonse Areola	(France) Paris Saint-Germain	30 June 2021	
11 September 2020	RB	(Nigeria)	Ola Aina	(Italy) Torino	30 June 2021	
30 September 2020	LW	(England)	Ademola Lookman	(Germany) RB Leipzig	30 June 2021	
5 October 2020	CB	(Denmark)	Joachim Andersen	(France) Lyon	30 June 2021	
6 October 2020	CM	(England)	Ruben Loftus-Cheek	(England) Chelsea	30 June 2021	
1 February 2021	CF	(Nigeria)	Josh Maja	(France) Bordeaux	30 June 2021	

=== Loans out ===
Date from	Position	Nationality	Name	To	Date until	Ref.
28 August 2020	RB	(United States)	Marlon Fossey	(England) Shrewsbury Town	31 May 2021	
4 September 2020	CF	(England)	Martell Taylor-Crossdale	(England) Colchester United	18 October 2020	
6 September 2020	CB	(England)	Alfie Mawson	(England) Bristol City	31 May 2021	
7 September 2020	GK	(England)	Taye Ashby-Hammond	(England) Maidenhead United	31 May 2021	
7 September 2020	RB	(England)	Steven Sessegnon	(England) Bristol City	31 May 2021	
10 September 2020	GK	(England)	Marcus Bettinelli	(England) Middlesbrough	31 May 2021	
18 September 2020	RB	(Republic of Ireland)	Cyrus Christie	(England) Nottingham Forest	31 May 2021	
25 September 2020	LB	(England)	Jerome Opoku	(England) Plymouth Argyle	1 January 2021	
16 October 2020	CF	(England)	Timmy Abraham	(England) Plymouth Argyle	January 2021	
16 October 2020	RW	(France)	Anthony Knockaert	(England) Nottingham Forest	End of season	
15 January 2021	LB	(England)	Jaydn Mundle-Smith	(England) Maidstone United	End of season	
26 January 2021	CM	(Norway)	Stefan Johansen	(England) Queens Park Rangers	End of season	
30 January 2021	CF	(England)	Timmy Abraham	(Scotland) Raith Rovers	End of season	
30 January 2021	CM	(Ivory Coast)	Jean Michaël Seri	(France) Bordeaux	End of season	
1 February 2021	AM	(Democratic Republic of the Congo)	Neeskens Kebano	(England) Middlesbrough	End of season	
1 February 2021	CB	(France)	Maxime Le Marchand	(Belgium) Royal Antwerp	End of season	
1 February 2021	ST	(Mauritania)	Aboubakar Kamara	(France) Dijon	End of season	
21 April 2021	GK	(United States)	Damian Las	(United States) North Carolina FC	End of USL season	

=== Transfers out ===
Date from	Position	Nationality	Name	To	Fee	Ref.
1 July 2020	CM	(England)	Matt O'Riley	(England) Milton Keynes Dons	Rejected contract	
1 July 2020	GK	(Germany)	Toni Stahl	(Germany) Energie Cottbus	Free transfer	
31 July 2020	LB	(England)	Aaron Keto-Diyawa	(England) Wolverhampton Wanderers	Undisclosed	
6 August 2020	RM	(United States)	Luca de la Torre	(Netherlands) Heracles Almelo	Free transfer	
7 August 2020	GK	(England)	Magnus Norman	(England) Carlisle United	Free transfer	
13 August 2020	RB	(England)	Cody Drameh	(England) Leeds United	£400,000	
20 August 2020	CM	(Portugal)	Tiago Augusto	(Portugal) Sporting CP	Free transfer	
25 August 2020	CB	(Germany)	Moritz Jenz	(Switzerland) Lausanne-Sport	Undisclosed	
1 September 2020	GK	(Scotland)	Jordan Archer	(Scotland) Motherwell	Released	
1 September 2020	CB	(England)	Zico Asare	Unattached	Released	
1 September 2020	LB	(England)	Tristan Cover	Unattached	Released	
1 September 2020	LW	(Spain)	Nicolás Santos	(Spain) Racing Santander	Released	
1 September 2020	CF	(England)	Cameron Thompson	(England) Barnsley	Released	
1 September 2020	CB	(England)	Ben Tricker	Unattached	Released	

== Pre-season and friendlies ==
Win Draw Loss Fixtures

29 August 2020 Friendly	Fulham	2–2	MK Dons	New Malden
12:00 BST	Cairney; Kamara	Report	Brittain; Poole	Stadium: Motspur Park

== Competitions ==
=== Overview ===
Competition	First match	Last match	Starting round	Final position	Record							
Competition	First match	Last match	Starting round	Final position	Pld	W	D	L	GF	GA	GD	Win %
Premier League	12 September 2020	23 May 2021	Matchday 1	18th	38	5	13	20	27	53	−26	13.16
FA Cup	9 January 2021	24 January 2021	Third round	Fourth round	2	1	0	1	2	3	−1	50.00
EFL Cup	16 September 2020	1 October 2020	Second round	Fourth round	3	2	0	1	3	3	+0	66.67
Total					43	8	13	22	32	59	−27	18.60

Last updated: 23 May 2021
Source: Soccerway

=== Premier League ===
==== League table ====
Pos	Team	Pld	W	D	L	GF	GA	GD	Pts	Qualification or relegation
16	Brighton & Hove Albion	38	9	14	15	40	46	−6	41	
17	Burnley	38	10	9	19	33	55	−22	39	
18	Fulham (R)	38	5	13	20	27	53	−26	28	Relegation to EFL Championship
19	West Bromwich Albion (R)	38	5	11	22	35	76	−41	26	Relegation to EFL Championship
20	Sheffield United (R)	38	7	2	29	20	63	−43	23	Relegation to EFL Championship

Source: Premier League
Rules for classification: 1) Points; 2) Goal difference; 3) Goals scored; 4) If the champions, relegated teams or qualified teams for UEFA competitions cannot be determined by rules 1 to 3, rules 4.1 to 4.3 are applied – 4.1) Points gained in head-to-head record between such teams; 4.2) Away goals scored in head-to-head record between such teams; 4.3) Play-offs
(R) Relegated

==== Results summary ====
Overall								Home						Away					
Pld	W	D	L	GF	GA	GD	Pts	W	D	L	GF	GA	GD	W	D	L	GF	GA	GD
38	5	13	20	27	53	−26	28	2	4	13	9	28	−19	3	9	7	18	25	−7

Last updated: 23 May 2021.
Source: Premier League

==== Results by round ====
Round	1	2	3	4	5	6	7	8	9	10	11	12	13	14	15	16	17	18	19	20	21	22	23	24	25	26	27	28	29	30	31	32	33	34	35	36	37	38
Ground	H	A	H	A	A	H	H	A	H	A	A	H	H	A	H	A	A	H	H	A	A	H	H	A	H	A	H	A	H	H	A	H	A	A	H	A	A	H
Result	L	L	L	L	D	L	W	L	L	W	L	D	D	D	D	D	D	L	L	D	D	L	D	W	W	D	L	W	L	L	L	L	D	L	L	L	D	L
Position	19	18	20	20	20	20	17	17	18	17	17	18	18	18	18	18	18	18	18	18	18	18	18	18	18	18	18	18	18	18	18	18	18	18	18	18	18	18

Updated to match(es) played on 23 May 2021. Source: Premier League
A = Away; H = Home; W = Win; D = Draw; L = Loss

==== Matches ====
The 2020–21 season fixtures were released on 20 August.

12 September 2020 1	Fulham	0–3	Arsenal	Fulham
12:30 BST (UTC+1)	Hector (yellow card) 26'; Cairney (yellow card) 61'	Report	Lacazette 8'; Aubameyang (yellow card) 39', (goal) 57'; Gabriel 49'; Bellerín (yellow card) 55'	Stadium: Craven Cottage; Attendance: 0 Referee: Chris Kavanagh

19 September 2020 2	Leeds United	4–3	Fulham	Leeds
15:00 BST (UTC+1)	Costa 5', 57'; Klich 41' (pen.), (yellow card) 82'; Bamford 50'	Report	Mitrović 34' (pen.), 67', (yellow card) 88'; Decordova-Reid 62'; Tete (yellow card) 90'	Stadium: Elland Road; Attendance: 0 Referee: Anthony Taylor

28 September 2020 3	Fulham	0–3	Aston Villa	Fulham
17:45 BST	Decordova-Reid (yellow card) 11'; Cairney (yellow card) 23'; Bryan (yellow card) 45+3'; Odoi (yellow card) 47'; Le Marchand (yellow card) 68'; Kamara (yellow card) 90+1'	Report	Grealish 4'; Targett (yellow card) 11'; Hourihane 15'; Mings 48', (yellow card) 90+1'; McGinn (yellow card) 59'	Stadium: Craven Cottage; Attendance: 0 Referee: Stuart Attwell

4 October 2020 4	Wolverhampton Wanderers	1–0	Fulham	Wolverhampton
14:00 BST	Neto 56'; Neves (yellow card) 90+2'	Report	Le Marchand (yellow card) 79'	Stadium: Molineux Stadium; Attendance: 0 Referee: Darren England

18 October 2020 5	Sheffield United	1–1	Fulham	Sheffield
12:00 BST	Sharp 85' (pen.)	Report	Zambo Anguissa (yellow card) 21'; Mitrovic (penalty missed) 57'; Lookman 77'; Cavaleiro (yellow card) 82'	Stadium: Bramall Lane; Attendance: 0 Referee: Andre Marriner

24 October 2020 6	Fulham	1–2	Crystal Palace	Fulham
15:00 BST	Kamara (red card) 88'; Cairney 90+5'	Report	Riedewald 8'; Zaha 64'; Guaita (yellow card) 90+7'	Stadium: Craven Cottage; Attendance: 0 Referee: Graham Scott

2 November 2020 7	Fulham	2–0	West Bromwich Albion	Fulham
17:30 GMT	Reid 26', (yellow card) 55'; Aina 30'; Lookman (yellow card) 57'; Reed (yellow card) 83'	Report	Gallagher (yellow card) 47'; Sawyers (yellow card) 69'	Stadium: Craven Cottage; Attendance: 0 Referee: Simon Hooper

7 November 2020 8	West Ham United	1–0	Fulham	Stratford
20:00 GMT	Ogbonna (yellow card) 56'; Souček 90+1'; Diop (yellow card) 90+8'	Report	Mitrović (yellow card) 55'; Loftus-Cheek (yellow card) 88'; Lookman (penalty missed) 90'+8	Stadium: London Stadium; Attendance: 0 Referee: Robert Jones

22 November 2020 9	Fulham	2–3	Everton	Fulham
12:00 GMT	Reid 15', (yellow card) 29'; Robinson (yellow card) 56'; Cavaleiro (penalty missed) 68'; Loftus-Cheek 70'	Report	Calvert-Lewin 1', 29'; Doucouré 35'	Stadium: Craven Cottage; Attendance: 0 Referee: Andrew Madley

30 November 2020 10	Leicester City	1–2	Fulham	Leicester
17:30 GMT	Barnes 86'	Report	Reed (yellow card) 18'; Lookman 30'; Cavaleiro 38' (pen.); Adarabioyo (yellow card) 89'	Stadium: King Power Stadium; Attendance: 0 Referee: Simon Hooper

5 December 2020 11	Manchester City	2–0	Fulham	Manchester
15:00 GMT	Sterling 5'; De Bruyne 26' (pen.)	Report		Stadium: City of Manchester Stadium; Attendance: 0 Referee: Jonathan Moss

13 December 2020 12	Fulham	1–1	Liverpool	Fulham
16:30 GMT	Andersen (yellow card) 20'; Reid 25'; Lemina (yellow card) 46'; Lookman (yellow card) 75'	Report	Jones (yellow card) 31'; Salah 79' (pen.)	Stadium: Craven Cottage; Attendance: 2,000; Referee: Andre Marriner

16 December 2020 13	Fulham	0–0	Brighton & Hove Albion	Fulham
20:00 GMT	Robinson (yellow card) 76'	Report		Stadium: Craven Cottage; Attendance: 0 Referee: Robert Jones

19 December 2020 14	Newcastle United	1–1	Fulham	Newcastle upon Tyne
20:00 GMT	Wilson 64' (pen.); Clark (yellow card) 72'	Report	Ritchie 42' (o.g.); Andersen (yellow card) 46', (red card) 62'; Robinson (yellow card) 81'; Hector (yellow card) 90+6'	Stadium: St James' Park; Attendance: 0 Referee: Graham Scott

26 December 2020 15	Fulham	0–0	Southampton	Fulham
15:00 GMT	Reid (yellow card) 38'; Zambo Anguissa (yellow card) 75'	Report		Stadium: Craven Cottage; Attendance: 0 Referee: Darren England

13 January 2021 16	Tottenham Hotspur	1–1	Fulham	Tottenham
20:15 GMT	Kane 25'; Højbjerg (yellow card) 64'	Report	Zambo Anguissa (yellow card) 18'; Cavaleiro 74'; Andersen (yellow card) 90+2'	Stadium: Tottenham Hotspur Stadium; Attendance: 0 Referee: Paul Tierney
Note: The match was originally scheduled for 30 December 2020, but was postponed due to safety concerns following a COVID-19 outbreak at Fulham.

16 January 2021 18	Fulham	0–1	Chelsea	Fulham
17:30 GMT	Robinson (red card) 44'; Reid (yellow card) 69'; Lookman (yellow card) 88'	Report	Ziyech (yellow card) 72'; Mount 78'; Thiago Silva (yellow card) 82'; Azpilicueta (yellow card) 90+4'	Stadium: Craven Cottage; Attendance: 0 Referee: Peter Bankes
Note: The match originally scheduled for 15 January 2021, but moved forward one day due to Fulham playing Tottenham Hotspur at 13 January.

20 January 2021 19	Fulham	1–2	Manchester United	Fulham
20:15 GMT	Lookman 5'; Zambo Anguissa (yellow card) 12'; Bryan (yellow card) 62'; Aina (yellow card) 69'	Report	Pogba (yellow card) 10', (goal) 65'; Cavani 21'	Stadium: Craven Cottage; Attendance: 0 Referee: Martin Atkinson

27 January 2021 20	Brighton & Hove Albion	0–0	Fulham	Falmer
19:30 GMT	Bissouma (yellow card) 27'; Mac Allister (yellow card) 44'	Report	Reed (yellow card) 45+1'	Stadium: Falmer Stadium; Attendance: 0 Referee: Craig Pawson

30 January 2021 21	West Bromwich Albion	2–2	Fulham	West Bromwich
15:00 GMT	Bartley 47', (yellow card) 75'; Pereira 66'	Report	Reid 10'; Cavaleiro 77'	Stadium: The Hawthorns; Attendance: 0 Referee: Anthony Taylor

3 February 2021 22	Fulham	0–2	Leicester City	Fulham
18:00 GMT	Reed (yellow card) 24'; Aina (yellow card) 59'; Cavaleiro (yellow card) 89'	Report	Iheanacho 17'; Justin 44'; Mendy (yellow card) 72'	Stadium: Craven Cottage; Attendance: 0 Referee: Robert Jones

6 February 2021 23	Fulham	0–0	West Ham United	Fulham
17:30 GMT	Andersen (yellow card) 90+3'	Report	Ogbonna (yellow card) 75'; Fabiański (yellow card) 90'; Yarmolenko (yellow card) 90+3'; Souček (red card) 90+7'	Stadium: Craven Cottage; Attendance: 0 Referee: Mike Dean

14 February 2021 24	Everton	0–2	Fulham	Liverpool
19:00 GMT	Keane (yellow card) 90+6'	Report	Maja 48', 65'; Onomah (yellow card) 90+6'	Stadium: Goodison Park; Attendance: 0 Referee: Andrew Madley

17 February 2021 17	Burnley	1–1	Fulham	Burnley
18:00 GMT	Brady (yellow card) 46'; Barnes 52'	Report	Loftus-Cheek (yellow card) 16'; Aina 49'	Stadium: Turf Moor; Attendance: 0 Referee: Jonathan Moss
Note: The match was originally scheduled for 3 January 2021, but was postponed due to safety concerns following a COVID-19 outbreak at Fulham.

20 February 2021 25	Fulham	1–0	Sheffield United	Fulham
20:00 GMT	Zambo Anguissa (yellow card) 45+2'; Lookman 61'	Report	Baldock (yellow card) 79'; McGoldrick (yellow card) 90+1'	Stadium: Craven Cottage; Attendance: 0 Referee: Martin Atkinson

28 February 2021 26	Crystal Palace	0–0	Fulham	Selhurst
12:00 GMT	Milivojević (yellow card) 55'	Report	Robinson (yellow card) 83'	Stadium: Selhurst Park; Attendance: 0 Referee: Anthony Taylor

4 March 2021 27	Fulham	0–1	Tottenham Hotspur	Fulham
18:00 GMT	Lookman (yellow card) 39'; Reed (yellow card) 90+4'	Report	Adarabioyo 19' (o.g.); Bale (yellow card) 45+1'	Stadium: Craven Cottage; Attendance: 0 Referee: David Coote

7 March 2021 28	Liverpool	0–1	Fulham	Liverpool
14:00 GMT	Jota (yellow card) 42'; Keïta (yellow card) 90+3'	Report	Tete (yellow card) 38'; Lemina 45', (yellow card) 47'; Mitrović (yellow card) 90+6'	Stadium: Anfield; Attendance: 0 Referee: Kevin Friend

13 March 2021 29	Fulham	0–3	Manchester City	Fulham
20:00 GMT		Report	Stones 47'; Gabriel Jesus 56'; Agüero 60' (pen.)	Stadium: Craven Cottage; Attendance: 0 Referee: Andre Marriner

19 March 2021 30	Fulham	1–2	Leeds United	Fulham
20:00 GMT	Andersen 38'; Lemina (yellow card) 51'; Loftus-Cheek (yellow card) 90+2'	Report	Bamford 29', (yellow card) 31'; Raphinha 58'; Phillips (yellow card) 90+4'	Stadium: Craven Cottage; Attendance: 0 Referee: David Coote

4 April 2021 31	Aston Villa	3–1	Fulham	Aston
16:30 BST	Douglas Luiz (yellow card) 15'; Trézéguet 78', 81'; Watkins 87'	Report	Andersen (yellow card) 16'; Mitrović 61'; Reid (yellow card) 74'	Stadium: Villa Park; Attendance: 0 Referee: Andrew Madley

9 April 2021 32	Fulham	0–1	Wolverhampton Wanderers	Fulham
20:00 BST		Report	Traoré 90+3'	Stadium: Craven Cottage; Attendance: 0 Referee: Jonathan Moss

18 April 2021 33	Arsenal	1–1	Fulham	Holloway
13:30 BST	Nketiah 90+7'	Report	Andersen (yellow card) 50'; Maja 59' (pen.); Reid (yellow card) 61'; Areola (yellow card) 89'	Stadium: Emirates Stadium; Attendance: 0 Referee: Craig Pawson

1 May 2021 34	Chelsea	2–0	Fulham	London
17:30 BST	Havertz 10', 49'; Zouma (yellow card) 41'	Report	Aina (yellow card) 90+4'	Stadium: Stamford Bridge; Attendance: 0 Referee: Kevin Friend

10 May 2021 35	Fulham	0–2	Burnley	Fulham
20:00 BST	Zambo Anguissa (yellow card) 40'; Lemina (yellow card) 83'	Report	Westwood 35'; Wood 44'	Stadium: Craven Cottage; Attendance: 0 Referee: David Coote

15 May 2021 36	Southampton	3–1	Fulham	Southampton
15:00 BST	Adams 27'; Tella 60'; Walcott 82'	Report	Andersen (yellow card) 26'; Carvalho 75'	Stadium: St Mary's Stadium; Attendance: 0 Referee: Craig Pawson

18 May 2021 37	Manchester United	1–1	Fulham	Manchester
18:00 BST	Cavani 15'; Fernandes (yellow card) 18'; Shaw (yellow card) 89'	Report	Lemina (yellow card) 51'; Bryan 76'; Lookman (yellow card) 87'; Areola (yellow card) 90+3'	Stadium: Old Trafford; Attendance: 10,000; Referee: Lee Mason

23 May 2021 38	Fulham	0–2	Newcastle United	Fulham
16:00 BST	Tete (yellow card) 75'	Report	Willock 23'; Schär 88' (pen.)	Stadium: Craven Cottage; Attendance: 10,000; Referee: Chris Kavanagh

=== FA Cup ===
The third round draw was made on 30 November, with Premier League and EFL Championship clubs all entering the competition. The draw for the fourth and fifth round were made on 11 January, conducted by Peter Crouch.

9 January 2021 Third round	Queens Park Rangers	0–2 (a.e.t.)	Fulham	Shepherd's Bush
15:00 GMT	Cameron (yellow card) 35'; Barbet (yellow card) 112'; Hämäläinen (yellow card) 115'	Report	Decordova-Reid 104'; Kebano 105+3'	Stadium: Kiyan Prince Foundation Stadium; Attendance: 0 Referee: Simon Hooper

24 January 2021 Fourth round	Fulham	0–3	Burnley	Fulham
14:30 GMT	Kamara (yellow card) 75'	Report	Rodriguez 31', 71' (pen.); Tarkowski (yellow card) 75'; Pieters (yellow card) 80'; Long 81'	Stadium: Craven Cottage; Attendance: 0 Referee: Andrew Madley

=== EFL Cup ===
The draw for both the second and third round were confirmed on September 6, live on Sky Sports by Phil Babb. The fourth round draw was conducted on 17 September 2020 by Laura Woods and Lee Hendrie live on Sky Sports.

16 September 2020 Second round	Ipswich Town	0–1	Fulham	Ipswich
19:00 BST		Report	Mitrović 38'	Stadium: Portman Road; Attendance: 0 Referee: Dean Whitestone

23 September 2020 Third round	Fulham	2–0	Sheffield Wednesday	Fulham
19:00 BST	Kamara 9'; Decordova-Reid 32'; Odoi (yellow card) 53'	Report	Odubajo (yellow card) 63'	Stadium: Craven Cottage; Attendance: 0 Referee: Lee Mason

1 October 2020 Fourth round	Brentford	3–0	Fulham	Brentford
17:30 BST	Forss 37'; Fosu (yellow card) 47'; Benrahma 62', 77'	Report	Kamara (yellow card) 12'; Johansen (yellow card) 49'	Stadium: Brentford Community Stadium; Attendance: 0 Referee: Jonathan Moss

== Squad statistics ==
=== Appearances and goals ===
No.	Pos	Nat	Player	Total		Premier League		FA Cup		EFL Cup	
No.	Pos	Nat	Player	Apps	Goals	Apps	Goals	Apps	Goals	Apps	Goals
Goalkeepers
1	GK	(France) FRA	Alphonse Areola	37	0	36	0	0	0	1	0
12	GK	(Slovakia) SVK	Marek Rodák	6	0	2	0	2	0	2	0
31	GK	(Spain) ESP	Fabri	0	0	0	0	0	0	0	0
Defenders
2	DF	(Netherlands) NED	Kenny Tete	24	0	18+4	0	1	0	1	0
3	DF	(Jamaica) JAM	Michael Hector	8	0	3+1	0	1+1	0	2	0
4	DF	(Belgium) BEL	Denis Odoi	8	0	3	0	0+2	0	2+1	0
5	DF	(Denmark) DEN	Joachim Andersen	31	1	30+1	1	0	0	0	0
13	DF	(United States) USA	Tim Ream	10	0	7	0	2	0	1	0
16	DF	(England) ENG	Tosin Adarabioyo	34	0	33	0	1	0	0	0
23	DF	(England) ENG	Joe Bryan	19	1	7+9	1	2	0	0+1	0
30	DF	(Netherlands) NED	Terence Kongolo	2	0	1	0	1	0	0	0
33	DF	(United States) USA	Antonee Robinson	32	0	24+4	0	0+1	0	3	0
34	DF	(Nigeria) NGR	Ola Aina	33	2	31	2	1	0	1	0
Midfielders
10	MF	(Scotland) SCO	Tom Cairney	11	1	9+1	1	0	0	0+1	0
15	MF	(England) ENG	Ruben Loftus-Cheek	32	1	21+9	1	1+1	0	0	0
18	MF	(Gabon) GAB	Mario Lemina	30	1	19+9	1	1	0	1	0
21	MF	(England) ENG	Harrison Reed	33	0	26+5	0	1	0	0+1	0
25	MF	(England) ENG	Josh Onomah	15	0	4+7	0	2	0	2	0
29	MF	(Cameroon) CMR	André-Frank Zambo Anguissa	38	0	29+7	0	1	0	1	0
35	MF	(Australia) AUS	Tyrese Francois	2	0	0+1	0	0	0	0+1	0
48	MF	(England) ENG	Fábio Carvalho	6	1	3+1	1	0+1	0	0+1	0
58	MF	(England) ENG	Sylvester Jasper	0	0	0	0	0	0	0	0
Forwards
9	FW	(Serbia) SRB	Aleksandar Mitrović	31	4	13+14	3	2	0	1+1	1
14	FW	(Jamaica) JAM	Bobby Decordova-Reid	37	7	28+5	5	1+1	1	2	1
17	FW	(Portugal) POR	Ivan Cavaleiro	37	3	27+9	3	1	0	0	0
19	FW	(England) ENG	Ademola Lookman	35	4	31+3	4	0	0	0+1	0
27	FW	(Nigeria) NGR	Josh Maja	15	3	9+6	3	0	0	0	0
Out on Loan
7	MF	(Democratic Republic of the Congo) COD	Neeskens Kebano	10	1	1+4	0	0+2	1	3	0
8	MF	(Norway) NOR	Stefan Johansen	2	0	0	0	0	0	2	0
11	FW	(France) FRA	Anthony Knockaert	3	0	0	0	0	0	3	0
20	DF	(France) FRA	Maxime Le Marchand	4	0	1+1	0	0	0	2	0
22	DF	(Republic of Ireland) IRL	Cyrus Christie	0	0	0	0	0	0	0	0
24	MF	(Ivory Coast) CIV	Jean Michaël Seri	2	0	0	0	0	0	1+1	0
47	FW	(Mauritania) MTN	Aboubakar Kamara	14	1	2+9	0	1	0	2	1

Last updated: 23 May 2021
Source: Competitions

=== Top scorers ===
Includes all competitive matches. The list is sorted by squad number when total goals are equal.

Last updated 23 May 2021.

Rank	No.	Nationality	Player	Premier League	FA Cup	EFL Cup	Total
1
1	14	(Jamaica)	Bobby Decordova-Reid	5	1	1	7
2
2	19	(England)	Ademola Lookman	4	0	0	4
3
3	9	(Serbia)	Aleksandar Mitrović	2	0	1	3
3	17	(Portugal)	Ivan Cavaleiro	3	0	0	3
3	27	(Nigeria)	Josh Maja	3	0	0	3
6
6	34	(Nigeria)	Ola Aina	2	0	0	2
7
7	5	(Denmark)	Joachim Andersen	1	0	0	1
7	7	(Democratic Republic of the Congo)	Neeskens Kebano	0	1	0	1
7	10	(Scotland)	Tom Cairney	1	0	0	1
7	15	(England)	Ruben Loftus-Cheek	1	0	0	1
7	18	(Gabon)	Mario Lemina	1	0	0	1
7	23	(England)	Joe Bryan	1	0	0	1
7	47	(Mauritania)	Aboubakar Kamara	0	0	1	1
7	48	(England)	Fábio Carvalho	1	0	0	1
Own goals				1	0	0	1
TOTALS				27	2	3	33
