= Malcom Bokele =

Footballer (born 2000)

Personal information
- Full name: Malcom Bokele Mputu
- Date of birth: 12 February 2000 (age 26)
- Place of birth: Lyon, France
- Height: 1.93 m (6 ft 4 in)
- Position: Centre-back

Team information
- Current team: Göztepe
- Number: 26

Youth career
- AS Bellecour Perrache
- Eveil Lyon
- 2011–2014: Lyon
- 2014–2017: FC Lyon

Senior career*
Years	Team	Apps	(Gls)
2017–2019	Bourg-Péronnas B	5	(0)
2019–2020	Metz B	9	(0)
2020–2022	Bordeaux B	8	(0)
2021–2024	Bordeaux	56	(2)
2021–2022	→ Villefranche (loan)	14	(0)
2024–	Göztepe	61	(4)

International career^{‡}
2021	Cameroon U23	1	(0)
2023–	Cameroon	2	(0)
- * Club domestic league appearances and goals as of 10 June 2026 ‡ National team caps and goals as of 00:44, 4 September 2025 (UTC)

Malcom Bokele Mputu (born 12 February 2000) is a professional footballer who plays as centre-back for Süper Lig club Göztepe. Born in France, he plays for the Cameroon national team.

== Club career ==
Bokele is a youth product of the academies of AS Bellecour Perrache, Eveil Lyon, Lyon and FC Lyon. He began his senior career with the reserves of Bourg-Péronnas in 2017. He followed that up with a stint with the reserves of FC Metz from 2017 to 2019. In October 2019, he moved to the reserves of Bordeaux. On 1 June 2021, he signed his first professional contract with Bordeaux for 3 years. He joined Villefranche on 29 January 2022 for the second half of the 2021–22 season in the Championnat National. Moving to the Bordeaux senior team for the 2022–23 season, he made his professional debut with them in a 0–0 Ligue 2 tie with Valenciennes on 22 August 2022.

== International career ==
Bokele was born in France to a Congolese father and a Cameroonian mother. He was called up to the Cameroon U23s in October 2021. He debuted with the senior Cameroon national team in a 1–1 2023 Africa Cup of Nations qualification tie with Namibia on 24 March 2023.

== Personal life ==
Bokele's brother Morgan Bokele is also a professional footballer.

== Career statistics ==
=== Club ===
As of match played 29 August 2025

Appearances and goals by club, season and competition
Club	Season	League			National cup		Europe		Other		Total	
Club	Season	Division	Apps	Goals	Apps	Goals	Apps	Goals	Apps	Goals	Apps	Goals
Bourg-Péronnas B	2017–18	National 3	5	0	—		—		—		5	0
Metz B	2019–20	National 3	9	0	—		—		—		9	0
Bordeaux B	2021–22	National 3	9	0	—		—		—		9	0
Villefranche Beaujolais	2021–22	Ligue 3	14	0	—		—		2 (Note: Appearances Ligue 1 relegation/promotion play-offs)	0	16	0
Bordeaux	2022–23	Ligue 2	29	2	3	0	—		—		32	2
Bordeaux	2023–24	Ligue 2	27	0	1	0	—		—		28	0
Bordeaux	Total		56	2	4	0	—		—		60	2
Göztepe	2024–25	Süper Lig	31	1	5	0	—		—		36	1
Göztepe	2025–26	Süper Lig	4	1	0	0	—		—		4	1
Göztepe	Total		35	2	5	0	—		—		40	2
Career total			128	4	9	0	0	0	2	0	139	4

=== International ===
As of match played 4 September 2025

Appearances and goals by national team and year
National team	Year	Apps	Goals
Cameroon	2023	2	0
Cameroon	2025	1	0
Total		3	0
