= Marvin De Lima =

French footballer (born 2004)

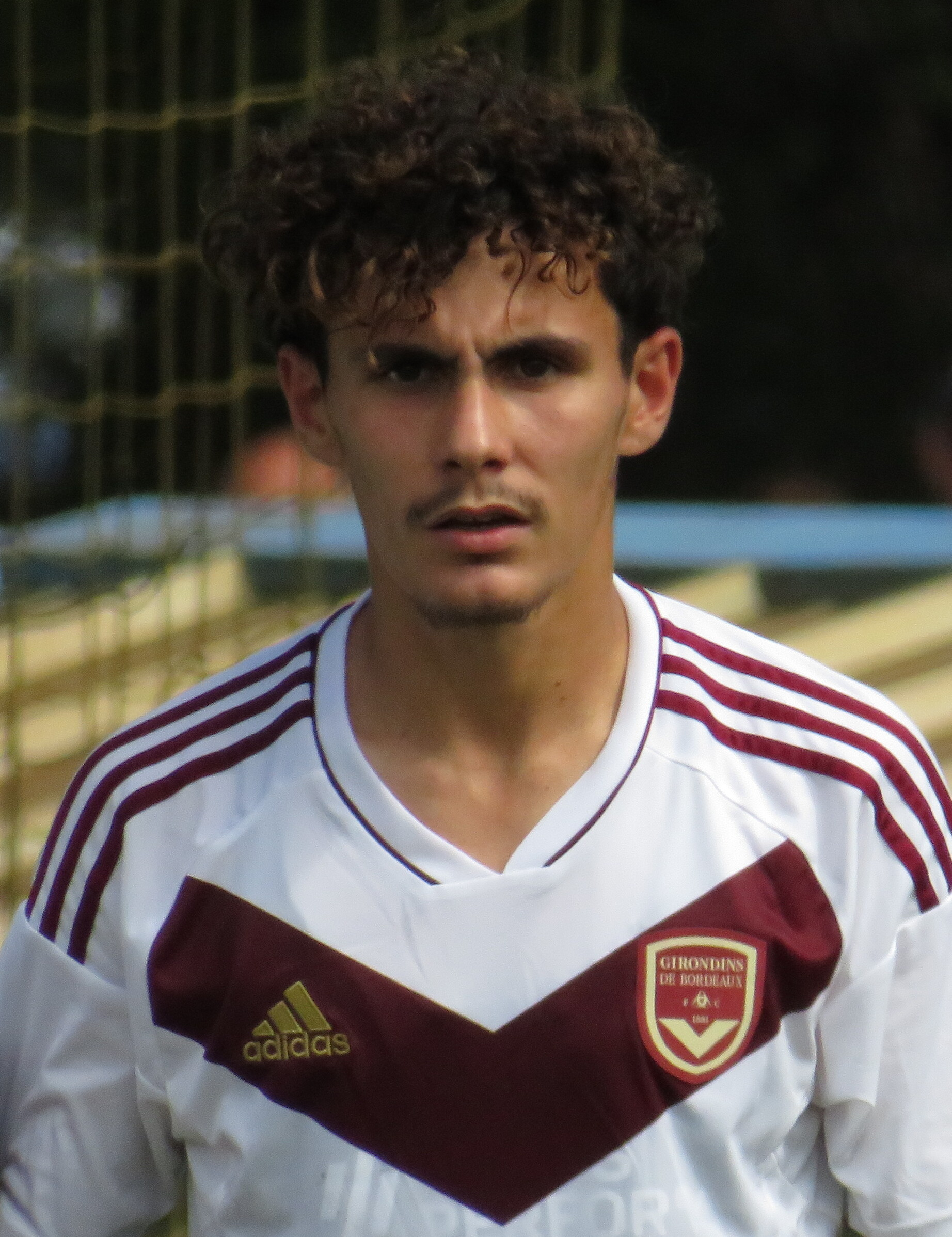
- De Lima with Bordeaux in 2023.

Personal information
- Date of birth: 19 April 2004 (age 22)
- Place of birth: Bayonne, France
- Height: 1.64 m (5 ft 5 in)
- Position: Midfielder

Team information
- Current team: Villefranche
- Number: 17

Youth career
- –2022: Bordeaux

Senior career*
Years	Team	Apps	(Gls)
2022–2024	Bordeaux B	20	(3)
2022–2024	Bordeaux	22	(1)
2025	Paris 13 Atletico	1	(0)
2025–2026	Bayonne	27	(4)
2026–	Villefranche	4	(0)

International career^{‡}
2022	France U19	2	(1)
2023	France U20	1	(1)
- * Club domestic league appearances and goals as of 5 September 2026 ‡ National team caps and goals as of 08:38, 2 January 2024 (UTC)

Marvin De Lima (born 19 April 2004) is a French professional footballer who plays as a midfielder for Ligue 3 club Villefranche.

== Club career ==
On 6 August 2022, De Lima made his professional debut for Bordeaux, scoring his team's final goal in a 3–0 Ligue 2 win over Rodez. Having come on as a substitute, his goal came two minutes and twenty seconds after his entrance onto the field, making him the fastest player to score a debut league goal for Bordeaux since 2006, and only the sixth player to score on his debut for the club as a substitute.

== International career ==
De Lima holds both French and Portuguese nationalities. He was called up to both the Portugal U19s and France U19s in November 2022, and opted for the latter.

== Career statistics ==
As of 1 July 2024

Appearances and goals by club, season and competition
Club	Season	League			Cup		Total	
Club	Season	Division	Apps	Goals	Apps	Goals	Apps	Goals
Bordeaux B	2021–22	National 3	1	1	—		1	1
Bordeaux B	2022–23	National 3	13	1	—		13	1
Bordeaux B	2023–24	National 3	6	1	—		6	1
Bordeaux B	Total		20	3	—		20	3
Bordeaux	2022–23	Ligue 2	7	1	0	0	7	1
Bordeaux	2023–24	Ligue 2	15	0	2	0	17	0
Bordeaux	Total		22	1	2	0	24	1
Career total			42	4	2	0	44	4
