= Zuriko Davitashvili =

Georgian footballer (born 2001)

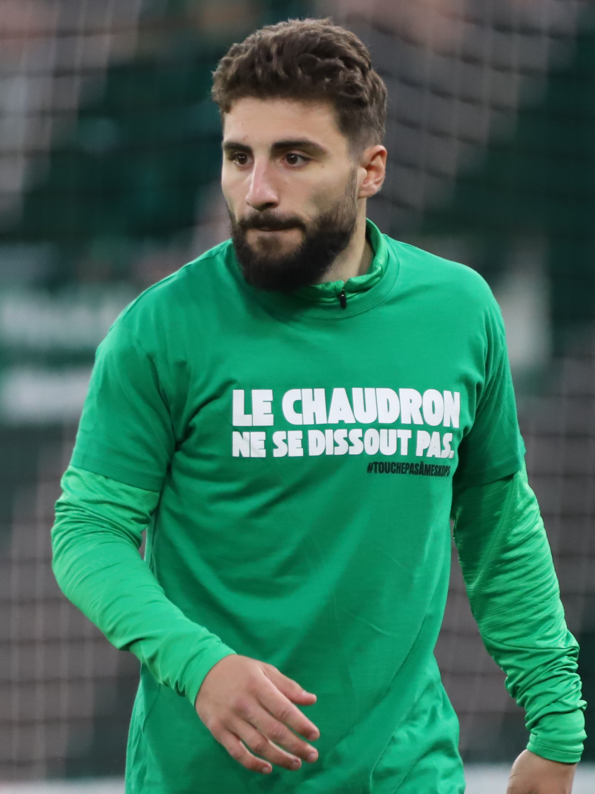
- Davitashvili with Saint-Étienne in 2025

Personal information
- Date of birth: 15 February 2001 (age 25)
- Place of birth: Tbilisi, Georgia
- Height: 1.75 m (5 ft 9 in)
- Position: Winger

Team information
- Current team: Saint-Étienne
- Number: 22

Youth career
- 2013–2017: Dinamo Tbilisi

Senior career*
Years	Team	Apps	(Gls)
2017–2018	Dinamo Tbilisi	6	(0)
2018–2019	Locomotive Tbilisi	29	(3)
2019–2021	Rubin Kazan	28	(2)
2020–2021	→ Rotor Volgograd (loan)	20	(0)
2021–2022	Arsenal Tula	20	(3)
2022–2023	Dinamo Batumi	14	(6)
2022–2023	→ Bordeaux (loan)	30	(5)
2023–2024	Bordeaux	37	(8)
2024–	Saint-Étienne	62	(23)

International career^{‡}
2016–2018	Georgia U17	12	(7)
2017–2018	Georgia U19	9	(4)
2019–2023	Georgia U21	5	(1)
2019–	Georgia	60	(7)
- * Club domestic league appearances and goals as of 11 May 2026 ‡ National team caps and goals as of 18 November 2026

Zuriko "Zuka" Davitashvili (Order of Honor) (Georgian: ზურიკო დავითაშვილი, romanized: zurik'o davitashvili; born 15 February 2001) is a Georgian professional footballer who plays as a winger for Ligue 2 club Saint-Étienne and the Georgia national team. He also plays as an attacking midfielder.

== Club career ==
=== Early career ===
Davitashvili made his career debut for Dinamo Tbilisi on 29 September 2017 in a match against Kolkheti Poti. He came on the pitch in the 72nd minute.

In 2018, he moved to Locomotive Tbilisi. In the same year The Guardian named Davitashvili among 60 best young players worldwide.

As a distinguished player of the Georgian U17 team, he received a golden medal from the Football Federation. Тhis acknowledgement resulted from his highly prolific performance in two qualifying rounds of 2018 European U17 championship. Being captain of the team, he scored seven goals in six matches, including a poker against N.Macedonia.

A year later he was named as the best young Georgian football player of the season.

=== Russia ===
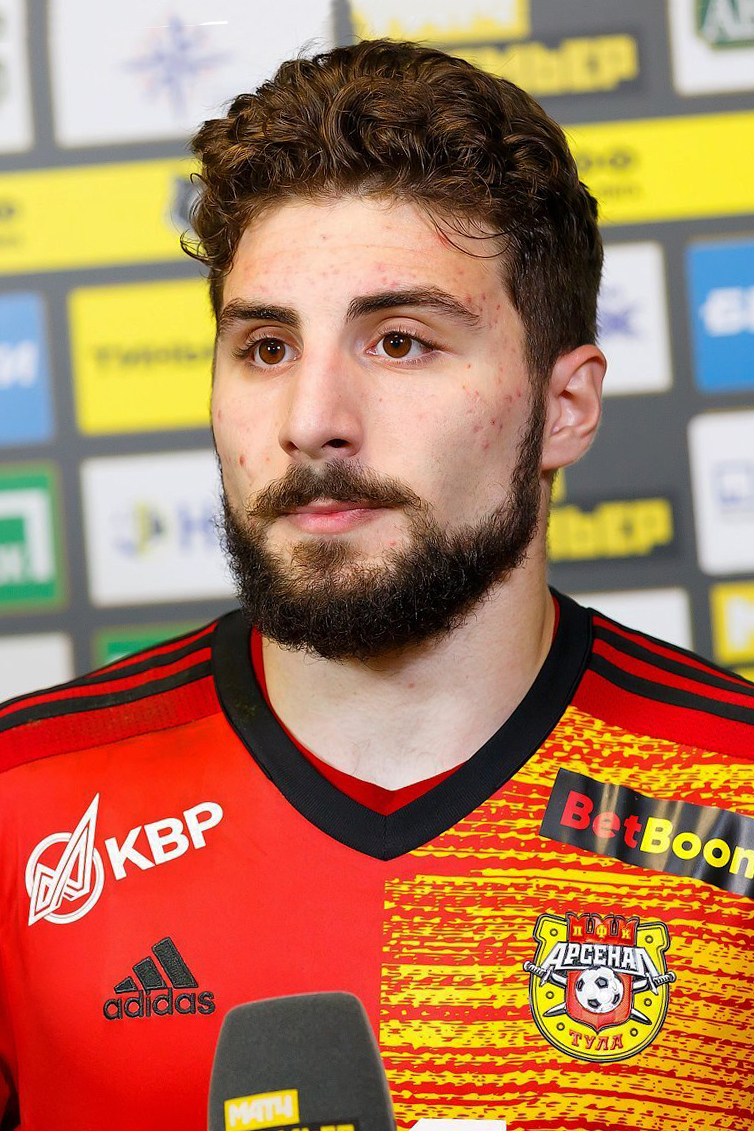
Davitashvili in 2021 with Arsenal Tula

On 29 June 2019, Davitashvili signed a three-year contract with Russian Premier League club Rubin Kazan. He made his Russian Premier League debut for Rubin on 15 July 2019 in the season opener against Lokomotiv Moscow, as a starter.

UEFA included Zuriko Davitashvili in the list of fifty young talents in early 2020.

On 20 August 2020, Davitashvili joined Rotor Volgograd on loan for the 2020–21 season. On 16 July 2021, his contract with Rubin was terminated by mutual consent. Four days later, he signed for Arsenal Tula.

=== Return to Georgia ===
On 23 March 2022, Davitashvili signed with Dinamo Batumi. After the 2022 Russian invasion of Ukraine, FIFA gave foreign players playing in Russia the permission to terminate their contract immediately.

=== Bordeaux ===
On 2 September 2022, Davitashvili moved to Bordeaux on a one-year loan deal. His goal in a debut game helped his new club to secure victory over Dijon on 17 September. Following the 2022–23 season, the club exercised the option to purchase him on a four-year deal.

During his two-year tenure at Bordeaux, Davitashvili made 71 appearances, scoring 14 goals and providing 12 assists.

=== Saint-Étienne ===
On 11 July 2024, Davitashvili signed for Ligue 1 club Saint-Étienne on a four-year contract, for a transfer fee of €5 million plus €1 million in potential bonuses. On 27 July, he made a debut in a friendly game against Villarreal, in which he scored a brace. On 5 October 2024, Davitashvili got himself on the scoresheet in an official league match as well. His hat-trick, the first delivered by a Georgian player in the French top league, sealed a 3–1 win over Auxerre. One of these goals was consequently voted goal of the month. Moreover, after two more goals scored against Angers on 26 October, Davitashvili was named Player of the Month by UNFP.

The same organization announced him as the 2025–26 Ligue 2 Player of the Season as he became the team topscorer with 14 goals in 29 league matches and made a solid contribution to their promotion bid.

== International career ==
Before 2016, Davitashvili played for the Georgia under-17s. After 2017, he played for the Georgia under-19s. He made his debut for Georgia national team on 5 September 2019 in a friendly against South Korea, as a starter. Three days later in a friendly game against Bulgaria he netted his first goal.

Davitashvili took part in 2023 European U21 Championship, co-hosted by Georgia. His stunning solo goal scored against Netherlands in a 1–1 draw, which proved crucial for winning the group stage, was selected by UEFA among the top three goals of the tournament. For his display Davitashvili received the Player of the Match award.

Davitashvili appeared in Georgia's all matches both in the Euro 2024 qualifying stages and Euro 2024 championship. On 2 July 2024, along with other squad members he received the Order of Honour.

== Personal life ==
Zuriko Davitashvili is the son of former football player Suliko Davitashvili, who later became a football coach working with youth teams and at professional clubs such as Rustavi.

Zuriko has a sister and younger brother.

He got married in 2023. The birth of his son was announced in November 2023.

== Career statistics ==
=== Club ===
As of match played 29 May 2026

Appearances and goals by club, season and competition
Club	Season	League			National cup (Note: Includes Georgian Cup, Russian Cup, Coupe de France)		Europe		Other		Total	
Club	Season	Division	Apps	Goals	Apps	Goals	Apps	Goals	Apps	Goals	Apps	Goals
Dinamo Tbilisi	2017	Erovnuli Liga	6	0	—		—		—		6	0
Locomotive Tbilisi	2018	Erovnuli Liga	19	3	0	0	—		—		19	3
Locomotive Tbilisi	2019	Erovnuli Liga	10	0	0	0	—		—		10	0
Locomotive Tbilisi	Total		29	3	0	0	—		—		29	3
Rubin Kazan	2019–20	Russian Premier League	26	2	0	0	—		—		26	2
Rubin Kazan	2020–21	Russian Premier League	2	0	—		—		—		2	0
Rubin Kazan	Total		28	2	0	0	—		—		28	2
Rotor Volgograd (loan)	2020–21	Russian Premier League	20	0	—		—		—		20	0
Arsenal Tula	2021–22	Russian Premier League	20	3	3	1	—		—		23	4
Dinamo Batumi	2022	Erovnuli Liga	14	6	—		4 (Note: Two appearances and one goal in UEFA Champions League, two appearances in UEFA Europa Conference League)	1	—		18	7
Bordeaux (loan)	2022–23	Ligue 2	30	5	2	1	—		—		32	6
Bordeaux	2023–24	Ligue 2	37	8	2	0	—		—		39	8
Saint-Étienne	2024–25	Ligue 1	33	9	1	0	—		—		34	9
Saint-Étienne	2025–26	Ligue 2	29	14	1	1	—		3 (Note: Appearances in Ligue 1 relegation/promotion play-offs)	1	33	16
Saint-Étienne	Total		62	23	2	1	—		3	1	67	25
Career total			247	53	9	3	4	1	3	1	263	58

=== International ===
As of match played 17 November 2026

Appearances and goals by national team and year
National team	Year	Apps	Goals
Georgia	2019	2	0
Georgia	2020	4	0
Georgia	2021	8	2
Georgia	2022	8	1
Georgia	2023	10	3
Georgia	2024	13	0
Georgia	2025	7	1
Georgia	2026	9	0
Total		60	7

Scores and results list Georgia's goal tally first, score column indicates score after each Davitashvili goal.

List of international goals scored by Zuriko Davitashvili
No.	Date	Venue	Opponent	Score	Result	Competition
1.	8 September 2021	Vasil Levski National Stadium, Sofia, Bulgaria	Bulgaria	1–4	1–4	Friendly
2.	12 October 2021	Fadil Vokrri Stadium, Pristina, Kosovo	Kosovo	2–1	2–1	2022 FIFA World Cup qualification
3.	5 June 2022	Huvepharma Arena, Razgrad, Bulgaria	Bulgaria	1–0	5–2	2022–23 UEFA Nations League C
4.	17 June 2023	AEK Arena, Larnaca, Cyprus	Cyprus	2–1	2–1	UEFA Euro 2024 qualifying
5.	12 October 2023	Mikheil Meskhi Stadium, Tbilisi, Georgia	Thailand	1–0	8–0	Friendly
6.	12 October 2023	Mikheil Meskhi Stadium, Tbilisi, Georgia	Thailand	6–0	8–0	Friendly
7.	4 September 2025	Boris Paichadze Dinamo Arena, Tbilisi, Georgia	Turkey	2–3	2–3	2026 FIFA World Cup qualification

== Honours ==
Georgia U17

- Kazakhstan President Cup runner-up: 2017

Individual

- Kazakhstan President Cup top scorer: 2017
- U19 Player of the Year in Georgia: 2018
- Best Georgian Young Player: 2019
- Order of Honour: 2024
- UNFP Ligue 1 Player of the Month: October 2024
- Ligue 1 Goal of the Month: October 2024
- UNFP Ligue 2 Player of the Season: 2025–26
- UNFP Ligue 2 Team of the Season: 2025–26
