= Julien Vetro =

French footballer (born 2004)

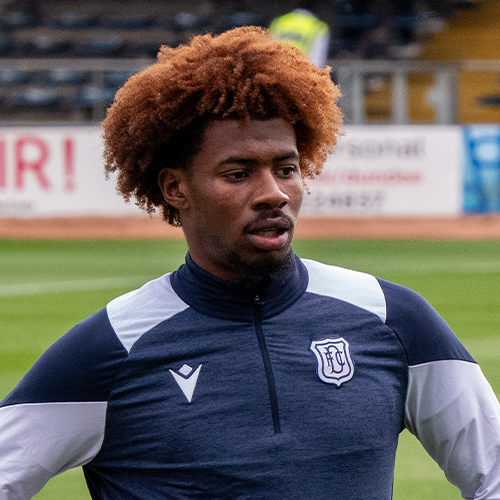
- Vetro in 2024

Personal information
- Full name: Julien Gael Vetro
- Date of birth: 23 February 2004 (age 22)
- Place of birth: Lagny-sur-Marne, France
- Height: 1.78 m (5 ft 10 in)
- Positions: Winger; second striker

Team information
- Current team: Sochaux
- Number: 47

Youth career
- 2011–2012: Noisiel FC
- 2012–2019: US Torcy
- 2019–2023: Bordeaux

Senior career*
Years	Team	Apps	(Gls)
2021–2024	Bordeaux B	27	(6)
2022–2024	Bordeaux	13	(1)
2024–2025	Burnley	0	(0)
2024–2025	→ Dundee (loan)	5	(0)
2025–	Sochaux	16	(0)
2025–	Sochaux B	8	(2)
- * Club domestic league appearances and goals as of 15 May 2026

Julien Gael Vetro (born 23 February 2004) is a French professional footballer who plays as a winger or second striker for Ligue 2 club Sochaux. He has previously played for Girondins de Bordeaux, Burnley and Dundee.

== Career ==
=== Youth career ===
Vetro came through the youth ranks of Noisiel FC and US Torcy before joining INF Clairefontaine. At the age of 15, Vetro joined the youth ranks of Girondins de Bordeaux.

=== Bordeaux ===
After a couple of years playing for their B team and having recovered from various injuries, Vetro made his senior debut for Bordeaux on 19 November 2022 as a substitute in a Coupe de France win away to Trélissac.

Vetro made his league debut for Les Girondins on 23 January 2024 in a Ligue 2 victory at home against Valenciennes, and provided an assist in the same game. Vetro scored his first goal for Bordeaux on 19 February 2024, netting a late equaliser away to Amiens.

=== Burnley ===
On 29 August 2024, Vetro joined the academy of EFL Championship club Burnley, signing a four-year deal with the Clarets.

==== Dundee (loan) ====
On the same day that he signed for Burnley, Vetro immediately joined Scottish Premiership club Dundee on a season-long loan after trialling for a period beforehand. Vetro made his debut on 21 September as a substitute in Dundee's Scottish League Cup quarter-final match away to Rangers. On 3 November, Vetro collapsed in the dressing room and was taken to hospital prior to a Dundee game which he was named as a substitute for, but recovered and returned to Dens Park in time to celebrate his team's comeback victory over Kilmarnock with his teammates. On 22 January 2025, Vetro was recalled by Burnley.

=== Sochaux ===
On 1 September 2025, Vetro left Burnley and returned to France, signing with Championnat National club FC Sochaux-Montbéliard on a permanent deal. On 12 September, Vetro made his debut off the bench in a league draw against AS Caen.

== Career statistics ==
As of match played 15 May 2026

Appearances and goals by club, season and competition
Club	Season	League			National cup (Note: Includes Coupe de France)		League cup (Note: Includes Scottish League Cup)		Other		Total	
Club	Season	Division	Apps	Goals	Apps	Goals	Apps	Goals	Apps	Goals	Apps	Goals
Bordeaux	2022–23	Ligue 2	0	0	1	0	—		—		1	0
Bordeaux	2023–24	Ligue 2	13	1	2	0	—		—		15	1
Bordeaux	Total		13	1	3	0	—		—		16	1
Burnley	2024–25	EFL Championship	0	0	0	0	0	0	—		0	0
Dundee (loan)	2024–25	Scottish Premiership	5	0	0	0	1	0	—		6	0
Sochaux	2025–26	Championnat National	16	0	6	1	0	0	0	0	22	1
Sochaux	2026–27	Ligue 2	0	0	0	0	0	0	0	0	0	0
Sochaux	Total		16	0	6	1	0	0	0	0	22	1
Sochaux B	2025–26	Championnat National 3	8	2	0	0	0	0	0	0	8	2
Career total			42	3	9	1	1	0	—		52	4
