= Danylo Ihnatenko =

Ukrainian footballer (born 1997)

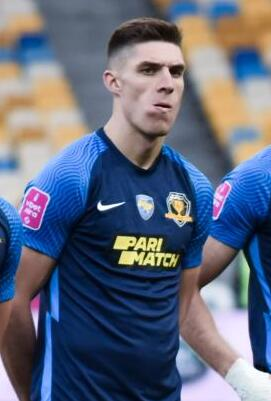
- Ihnatenko with Dnipro-1 in 2021

Personal information
- Full name: Danylo Ihorovych Ihnatenko
- Date of birth: 13 March 1997 (age 29)
- Place of birth: Zaporizhzhia, Ukraine
- Height: 1.89 m (6 ft 2 in)
- Position: Midfielder

Team information
- Current team: Slovan Bratislava
- Number: 77

Youth career
- 2009–2014: Metalurh Zaporizhzhia

Senior career*
Years	Team	Apps	(Gls)
2014–2015	Metalurh Zaporizhzhia	11	(1)
2016–2022	Shakhtar Donetsk	0	(0)
2018–2019	→ Mariupol (loan)	27	(0)
2019	→ Ferencváros (loan)	13	(1)
2020	→ Mariupol (loan)	14	(0)
2020–2022	→ Dnipro-1 (loan)	31	(4)
2022	→ Bordeaux (loan)	11	(0)
2022–2024	Bordeaux	65	(3)
2024–	Slovan Bratislava	53	(5)

International career
2016	Ukraine U21	1	(0)
2022–2023	Ukraine	6	(1)
- * Club domestic league appearances and goals as of 10 October 2026

Danylo Ihorovych Ihnatenko (Ukrainian: Данило Ігорович Ігнатенко; born 13 March 1997) is a Ukrainian professional footballer who plays as a midfielder for Slovan Bratislava.

== Club career ==
Ihnatenko is product of the Metalurh Zaporizhzhia youth team system. His first trainer was Mykola Syenovalov.

He made his debut for Metalurh Zaporizhzhia in the Ukrainian Premier League in a match against Dynamo Kyiv on 30 May 2015.

On 16 June 2020, Ihnatenko became champion with Ferencváros by beating Budapest Honvéd at the Hidegkuti Nándor Stadion on the 30th match day of the 2019–20 Nemzeti Bajnokság I season.

=== ŠK Slovan Bratislava ===
On 3 September 2024, Ihnatenko signed a three-year contract with Slovan Bratislava. Prior his arrival to Bratislava, he played for French Girondins de Bordeaux, where he made 76 appearances and scored 3 goals in the Ligue 1 and Ligue 2.

== International career ==
Ihnatenko made his debut for Ukraine in a 1–0 UEFA Nations League win over the Republic of Ireland on 8 June 2022.

== Career statistics ==
=== Club ===
As of match played 10 October 2026

Appearances and goals by club, season and competition
Club	Season	League			Cup		Continental		Other		Total	
Club	Season	Division	Apps	Goals	Apps	Goals	Apps	Goals	Apps	Goals	Apps	Goals
Metalurh Zaporizhzhia	2014–15	Ukrainian Premier League	1	0	0	0	—		—		1	0
Metalurh Zaporizhzhia	2015–16	Ukrainian Premier League	10	1	0	0	—		—		10	1
Metalurh Zaporizhzhia	Total		11	1	0	0	—		—		11	1
Mariupol (loan)	2017–18	Ukrainian Premier League	7	0	0	0	—		—		7	0
Mariupol (loan)	2018–19	Ukrainian Premier League	20	0	0	0	0	0	—		20	0
Mariupol (loan)	Total		27	0	0	0	0	0	—		27	0
Ferencváros (loan)	2019–20	Nemzeti Bajnokság I	13	1	3	0	10 (Note: Five appearances in UEFA Champions League, five appearances in UEFA Europa League)	0	—		26	1
Mariupol (loan)	2019–20	Ukrainian Premier League	11	0	2	0	0	0	—		13	0
Mariupol (loan)	2020–21	Ukrainian Premier League	3	0	0	0	—		—		3	0
Mariupol (loan)	Total		14	0	2	0	0	0	—		16	0
Dnipro-1 (loan)	2020–21	Ukrainian Premier League	17	1	2	0	—		—		19	1
Dnipro-1 (loan)	2021–22	Ukrainian Premier League	14	3	1	0	—		—		15	3
Dnipro-1 (loan)	Total		31	4	3	0	—		—		34	4
Bordeaux (loan)	2021–22	Ligue 1	11	0	0	0	—		—		11	0
Bordeaux	2022–23	Ligue 2	35	0	2	0	—		—		37	0
Bordeaux	2023–24	Ligue 2	30	1	3	1	—		—		33	2
Bordeaux	Total		65	1	5	1	—		—		70	2
Slovan Bratislava	2024–25	Slovak First Football League	23	3	3	0	5 (Note: Appearances in UEFA Champions League)	0	—		31	3
Slovan Bratislava	2025–26	Slovak First Football League	23	2	4	2	10 (Note: Three appearances in UEFA Champions League, two appearances in UEFA Europa League, five appearances in UEFA Conference League)	0	—		37	4
Slovan Bratislava	2026–27	Slovak First Football League	7	0	2	0	0	0	—		9	0
Slovan Bratislava	Total		53	5	9	2	15	0	—		77	7
Career total			225	12	22	3	25	0	0	0	272	15

=== International ===
Appearances and goals by national team and year
National team	Year	Apps	Goals
Ukraine	2022	5	1
Ukraine	2023	1	0
Total		6	1

Scores and results list Ukraine's goal tally first.

List of international goals scored by Danylo Ihnatenko
No.	Date	Venue	Opponent	Score	Result	Competition
1.	24 September 2022	Vazgen Sargsyan Republican Stadium, Yerevan, Armenia	Armenia	4–0	5–0	2022–23 UEFA Nations League B

== Honours ==
Ferencváros

- Nemzeti Bajnokság I: 2019–20

Slovan Bratislava

- Fortuna Liga: 2024–25, 2025–26
