= Yoann Barbet =

French footballer (born 1993)

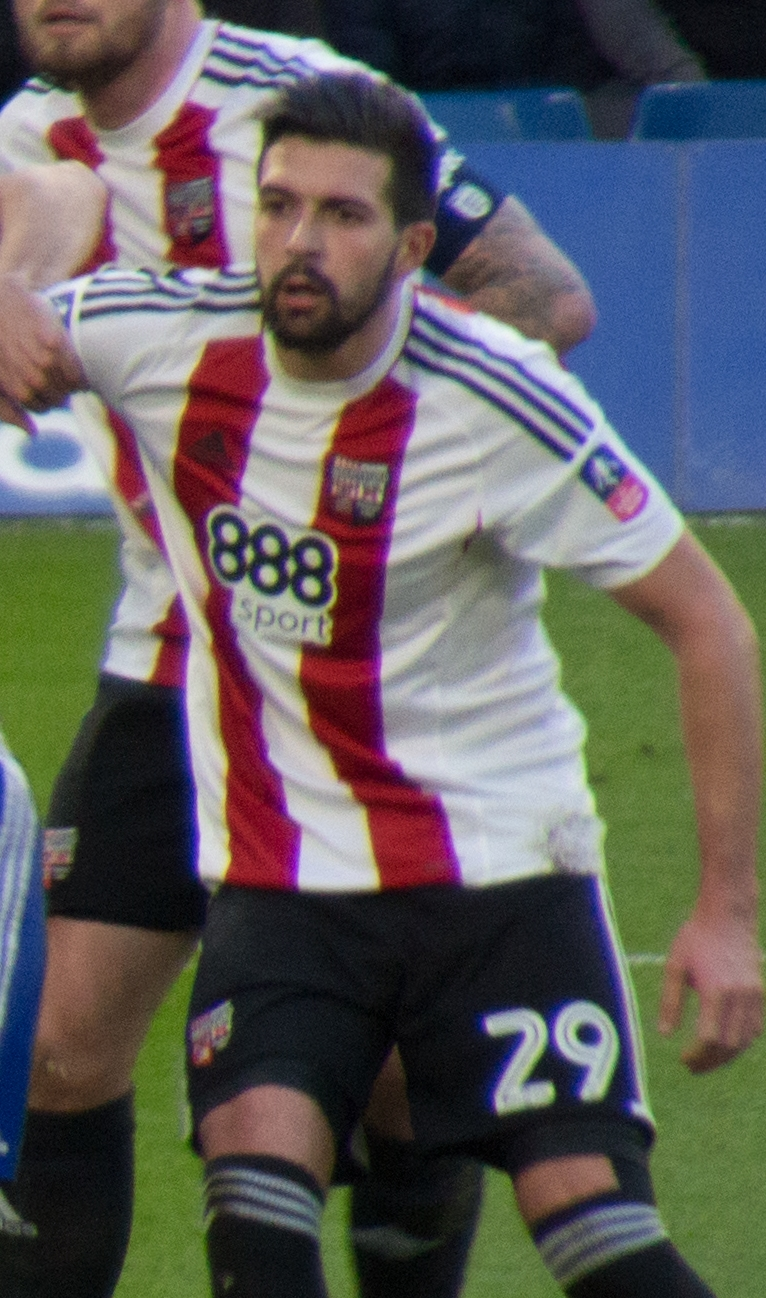
- Barbet playing for Brentford in 2017

Personal information
- Full name: Yoann Barbet
- Date of birth: 10 May 1993 (age 33)
- Place of birth: Libourne, France
- Height: 1.87 m (6 ft 2 in)
- Positions: Centre-back; left-back

Team information
- Current team: Al-Riyadh
- Number: 5

Youth career
- 1999–2000: AS Mouliets
- 2000–2004: Olympique Saint-Pey
- 2004–2007: FC Vallée de Gamage
- 2007–2011: Bordeaux

Senior career*
Years	Team	Apps	(Gls)
2011–2014	Bordeaux B	75	(13)
2014–2015	Chamois Niortais	33	(2)
2015–2019	Brentford	107	(6)
2019–2022	Queens Park Rangers	114	(4)
2022–2024	Bordeaux	65	(11)
2024–	Al-Riyadh	59	(3)

International career
2011	France U18	1	(0)
- * Club domestic league appearances and goals as of 4 May 2026

Yoann Barbet (born 10 May 1993) is a French professional footballer who plays for Al-Riyadh as a centre-back and left-back.

A product of the Bordeaux youth system, he signed his first professional contract with Chamois Niortais ahead of the 2014–15 season. From 2015 to 2019, Barbet played for Brentford, and from 2019 to 2022, for Queens Park Rangers, playing seven seasons in the second tier of English football. He returned to Bordeaux in 2022.

Barbet was capped by France at under-18 level, making one appearance in 2011.

== Club career ==
=== Bordeaux ===
As a youngster, Barbet represented AS Mouliets, Olympique Saint-Pey and FC Vallée de Gamage, before joining the youth setup at Ligue 1 club Bordeaux in July 2007. He made his debut for the club's reserve team in a 3–0 win against Saint-Alban on 2 April 2011 and went on to make a further four appearances during the final month of the season, helping the team to promotion to the Championnat de France Amateur. Over the next three seasons, Barbet established himself as a regular in the Bordeaux reserve line-up, making 70 appearances and scoring 12 goals. He finally won his maiden call into the first team squad for a Europa League group stage match versus Maccabi Tel Aviv on 12 December 2013, but remained an unused substitute during the 1–0 defeat. It was Barbet's only involvement with the first team and he departed the Stade Chaban-Delmas at the end of the 2013–14 season.

=== Chamois Niortais ===
Barbet joined Ligue 2 club in Chamois Niortais in July 2014, signing a two-year contract after a successful trial period. Initially signed as a back-up player, Barbet was given his chance at Niort after first-choice central defender Frédéric Bong suffered a long-term injury. He made the first professional appearance of his career in a 1–1 draw with Créteil on 22 August 2014, partnering Matthieu Sans in central defence. Barbet scored his first goal for the side in a 1–1 draw with Orléans the following month. He made 33 appearances and scored two goals during a mid-table season for Niort and departed the club on 25 June 2015.

=== Brentford ===
On 25 June 2015, Barbet moved to England to sign a four-year contract with Championship club Brentford for an undisclosed fee. He made his debut with a start in a 4–0 League Cup first round drubbing at the hands of Oxford United on 11 August and possibly put through his own net for the Us' second goal, which was credited to Danny Hylton. With Jack O'Connell largely preferred as third-choice centre back behind Harlee Dean and James Tarkowski, Barbet spent long periods in and out of the matchday squad through to the end of 2015. The unavailability of Tarkowski saw Barbet make his first appearance in over four months against Preston North End on 23 January 2016 and he assisted Alan Judge for one of Brentford's three goals in the victory. Tarkowski's subsequent departure from the club saw Barbet become Harlee Dean's partner in central defence through to the end of the 2015–16 season. He was sent off for the first time in his career after just five minutes of a match versus Sheffield Wednesday on 13 February, which Brentford eventually lost 4–0. On his return to the team in March, Barbet scored his first Bees goal with what proved to be a consolation in a 2–1 defeat to Charlton Athletic. He finished the 2015–16 season with 19 appearances.

After suffering an ankle injury during the 2016–17 pre-season, Barbet missed the first five weeks of the regular season. The form of centre backs Harlee Dean, John Egan, Andreas Bjelland and the emergence of teenage left back Tom Field relegated Barbet to a substitute role through the first half of the season, with occasional appearances at left back. After just three appearances in the opening months of 2017, Barbet broke into the team at the expense of centre back John Egan in mid-March and finished the season with 25 appearances.

Barbet began the 2017–18 season as one of manager Dean Smith's two first-choice centre backs, before dropping to the bench in October 2017. Despite being in and out of the team, he scored three goals in five appearances between September and November. With Rico Henry injured, Barbet was deployed as a left back for much of the season and finished the campaign with 37 appearances and three goals.

Entering the final year of his contract, Barbet continued as Dean Smith's first-choice left back during the early months of the 2018–19 season and after losing his place to fit-again Rico Henry, he returned to the team in as part of a central defensive trio under Smith's replacement Thomas Frank in December 2018. Barbet continued as a starter in the new formation until suffering a season-ending ankle injury in a match versus Wigan Athletic on 30 March 2019. Barbet rejected a new contract during the season and ended his Brentford career with 118 appearances and seven goals.

=== Queens Park Rangers ===
On 18 June 2019, Barbet joined Queens Park Rangers on a three-year deal. Manager Mark Warburton was one of the key factors for Barbet in his decision to join the club. Warburton flew over to Barbet's home in France to convince him to join QPR and this proved to be a deciding factor. On 12 July 2019, Barbet scored an own-goal in a pre-season fixture against Austria Vienna where they lost 3–1. On 28 September 2019, Barbet received a red card for committing a last-man foul on Hal Robson-Kanu in a 2–0 loss against West Brom meaning he had to serve a one-game suspension. On 22 October 2019, Barbet tore his hamstring in a 2–2 draw at Reading meaning his was out of the squad for two months after only making 10 appearances for QPR so far. This was Barbet's first muscle injury of his career. As Barbet was about to return, before the Birmingham game in mid-December, he tore his calf and the tendon in the muscle. This meant he would finally make his return on the 11 February 2020 in a 0–0 draw at Swansea. Barbet helped QPR go six undefeated after his return from injury meaning the team was only six points from playoffs before the league was put on hold due to COVID-19 pandemic. Following the release of club captain Grant Hall, in the restarted 2019–20 season, Barbet was named captain for the remaining games.

Barbet scored his first goal for the club in a 3–2 defeat to Coventry City in the second game of the 2020–21 season. On 6 February 2021, Barbet scored his second goal for the club which proved to be the winner in a 1–0 win over Blackburn Rovers. In the later part of the season, Barbet played in a back five alongside defenders Jordy de Wijs and Rob Dickie which lead to a good run of form. For the 2020-21 season, Barbet became the only outfield player in the Championship to play every minute. Barbet announced on June 6 that he was leaving the club after the two sides could not come to an agreement on a new deal.

=== Return to Bordeaux ===
On 1 September 2022, Barbet returned to Bordeaux, signing a three-year contract with his former club.

=== Al-Riyadh ===
On 27 August 2024, Barbet joined Al-Riyadh.

== International career ==
Barbet was capped by the France national under-18 football team on one occasion, playing 45 minutes in a 2–2 friendly draw with Belgium on 27 January 2011.

== Career statistics ==
As of match played 3 May 2024

Appearances and goals by club, season and competition
Club	Season	League			National cup		League cup		Total	
Club	Season	Division	Apps	Goals	Apps	Goals	Apps	Goals	Apps	Goals
Bordeaux B	2010–11	CFA 2	5	3	—		—		5	3
Bordeaux B	2011–12	CFA	16	2	—		—		16	2
Bordeaux B	2012–13	CFA	30	5	—		—		30	5
Bordeaux B	2013–14	CFA	24	3	—		—		24	3
Bordeaux B	Total		75	13	—		—		75	13
Chamois Niortais	2014–15	Ligue 2	33	2	2	0	0	0	35	2
Brentford	2015–16	Championship	18	1	0	0	1	0	19	1
Brentford	2016–17	Championship	23	1	2	1	0	0	25	2
Brentford	2017–18	Championship	34	3	1	0	2	0	37	3
Brentford	2018–19	Championship	32	1	2	0	2	0	36	1
Brentford	Total		107	6	5	1	5	0	117	7
Queens Park Rangers	2019–20	Championship	27	0	0	0	2	0	29	0
Queens Park Rangers	2020–21	Championship	46	2	1	0	0	0	47	2
Queens Park Rangers	2021–22	Championship	41	2	1	0	3	0	45	2
Queens Park Rangers	Total		114	4	2	0	5	0	121	4
Bordeaux	2022–23	Ligue 2	30	5	2	3	—		32	8
Bordeaux	2023–24	Ligue 2	35	6	4	0	—		39	6
Bordeaux	Total		65	11	6	3	—		71	14
Total			394	36	15	4	10	0	419	40

== Honours ==
Individual

- UNFP Ligue 2 Team of the Year: 2022–23
