= Lucas Rocrou =

French footballer (born 2003)

Personal information
- Date of birth: 27 March 2003 (age 23)
- Place of birth: Saint-Pierre, Réunion, France
- Height: 1.79 m (5 ft 10 in)
- Position: Right winger

Team information
- Current team: Bordeaux
- Number: 33

Youth career
- 2010–2018: AS Marsouins
- 2018–2022: Bordeaux

Senior career*
Years	Team	Apps	(Gls)
2021–2024	Bordeaux B	44	(4)
2022–2023	Bordeaux	3	(0)
2023	→ Bourg-Péronnas (loan)	0	(0)
2024–2025	Vendée Fontenay	7	(0)
2025–	Bordeaux	1	(0)

International career
2019	France U17	5	(0)
- * Club domestic league appearances and goals as of 07:16, 2 November 2025 (UTC)

Lucas Rocrou (born 27 March 2003) is a French professional footballer who plays as a right winger for Championnat National 1 club Bordeaux.

== Club career ==
Originally from the French overseas department of Réunion, Rocrou began playing football at AS Marsouins. In 2018, he joined the youth academy of Bordeaux. His first appearances with the club's reserve side in the Championnat National 3 came in the 2021–22 season.

On 6 August 2022, Rocrou made his professional debut for Bordeaux, coming on as a late-match substitute in a 3–0 Ligue 2 victory away to Rodez. He would go on to make two further substitute appearances in the first half of the season. On 3 January 2023, it was announced that Rocrou had signed his first professional contract with Bordeaux, a deal until the summer of 2024, and that he had been loaned out to Championnat National club Bourg-Péronnas for the remainder of the season. However, during his second training session with his new club, he injured himself on a shot, resulting in an estimation of eight weeks on the sidelines. Bourg-Péronnas decided not to wait for Rocrou's injury to heal and subsequently terminated the loan deal, precisely one week after he had joined the club. At the end of the 2023–24 season, Rocrou was released by Bordeaux.

== International career ==
Rocrou represented France at under-17 level, and made five appearances for the side in 2019.

== Career statistics ==
As of match played 25 October 2025

Appearances and goals by club, season and competition
Club	Season	League			Cup		Total	
Club	Season	Division	Apps	Goals	Apps	Goals	Apps	Goals
Bordeaux B	2021–22	National 3	17	2	—		17	2
Bordeaux B	2022–23	National 3	11	2	—		11	2
Bordeaux B	2023–24	National 3	16	0	—		16	0
Bordeaux B	Total		44	4	—		44	4
Bordeaux	2022–23	Ligue 2	3	0	0	0	3	0
Bourg-en-Bresse (loan)	2022–23	National	0	0	0	0	0	0
Vendée Fontenay	2024–25	National 3	7	0	—		7	0
Bordeaux	2025–26	National 2	1	0	2	0	3	0
Career total			55	4	2	0	54	4
