= Josh Maja =

Footballer (born 1998)

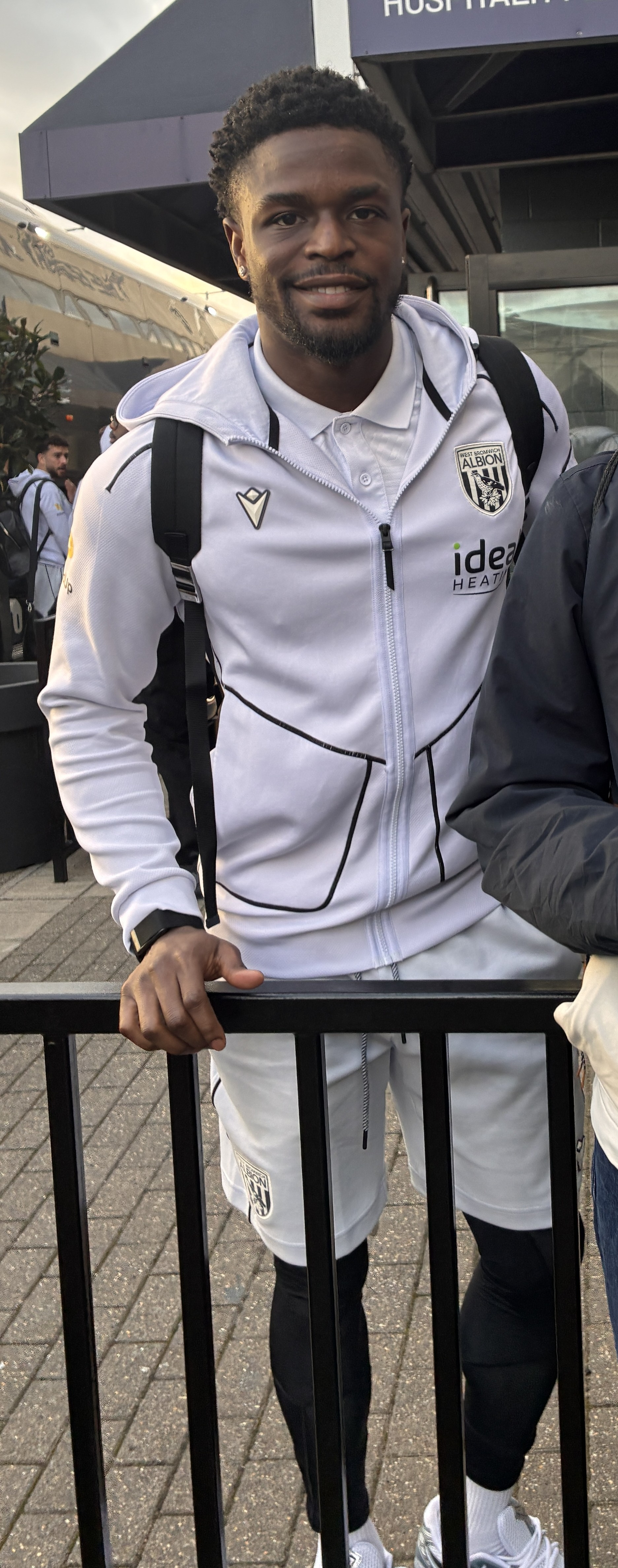
- Maja with West Bromwich Albion in 2025.

Personal information
- Full name: Joshua Erowoli Orisunmihare Oluwaseun Maja
- Date of birth: 27 December 1998 (age 27)
- Place of birth: Lewisham, England
- Height: 5 ft 11 in (1.81 m)
- Position: Striker

Team information
- Current team: Le Havre
- Number: 9

Youth career
- Crystal Palace
- Fulham
- Manchester City
- 2015–2016: Sunderland

Senior career*
Years	Team	Apps	(Gls)
2016–2019	Sunderland	41	(18)
2019–2023	Bordeaux	85	(25)
2021	→ Fulham (loan)	15	(3)
2022	→ Stoke City (loan)	15	(1)
2023–2026	West Bromwich Albion	78	(17)
2026–	Le Havre	8	(3)

International career
2019	Nigeria	1	(0)
- * Club domestic league appearances and goals as of 19:14, 25 October 2026 (UTC)

Joshua Erowoli Orisunmihare Oluwaseun Maja (born 27 December 1998) is a professional footballer who plays as a striker for Le Havre. Born in England, he played for the Nigeria national team.

Maja played youth football with Crystal Palace, Fulham and Manchester City and began his professional career with Sunderland, making 49 appearances and scoring 18 goals. In January 2019, he joined Bordeaux of France's Ligue 1. He later had loan spells at Fulham and Stoke City in 2021 and 2022, playing in the Premier League with the former. After one season in Ligue 2, his Bordeaux contract expired in 2023 and he joined West Bromwich Albion.

== Early life ==
Born in the London Borough of Lewisham to Nigerian parents, he grew up in Pimlico, London. As a youngster he played for the youth teams of Crystal Palace and Fulham, and also played for Manchester City.

== Club career ==
=== Sunderland ===
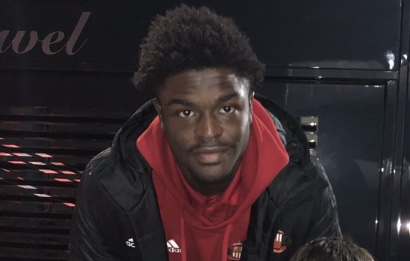
Maja with Sunderland in 2018

Maja was not offered a scholarship by Manchester City and in March 2015, Fulham reached an agreement with Sunderland for him to sign a two-year scholarship. In May 2016, he signed his first professional contract with the club, penning a three-year deal.

On 21 September 2016, Maja made his professional debut in a 2–1 victory at Queens Park Rangers in the third round of the EFL Cup, replacing Joel Asoro as a substitute for the final 21 minutes. He did not play again that season but did appear on the bench during their Premier League campaign, which ended in relegation.

Maja made his league debut on 16 December 2017, when he came on for James Vaughan at the Stadium of Light, going on to score his side's only goal of the match five minutes subsequently; the game resulted in Sunderland's first home win of 2017 and against Fulham, his former team during his youth. Manager Chris Coleman spoke positively of Maja afterwards, stating, "I've been very impressed with Josh. He's different, he gives us a big injection of personality". Maja went on to make 17 appearances in the Championship that season, failing to score anymore following his goal against Fulham, with the club suffering a second consecutive relegation, now to League One.

Relegation proved well personally for Maja, as he broke into the side's starting line-up; he went on to score in all of Sunderland's first four games in August, earning him a nomination for Player of the Month. With his contract due to expire at the end of the season, he was offered a contract extension, though he refused, amid reported interest from multiple clubs. His transfer saga was featured as part of the Netflix documentary Sunderland 'Til I Die. Maja went on to leave the club during the January transfer window, at the time, Maja had scored 16 goals in 30 league appearances.

=== Bordeaux ===
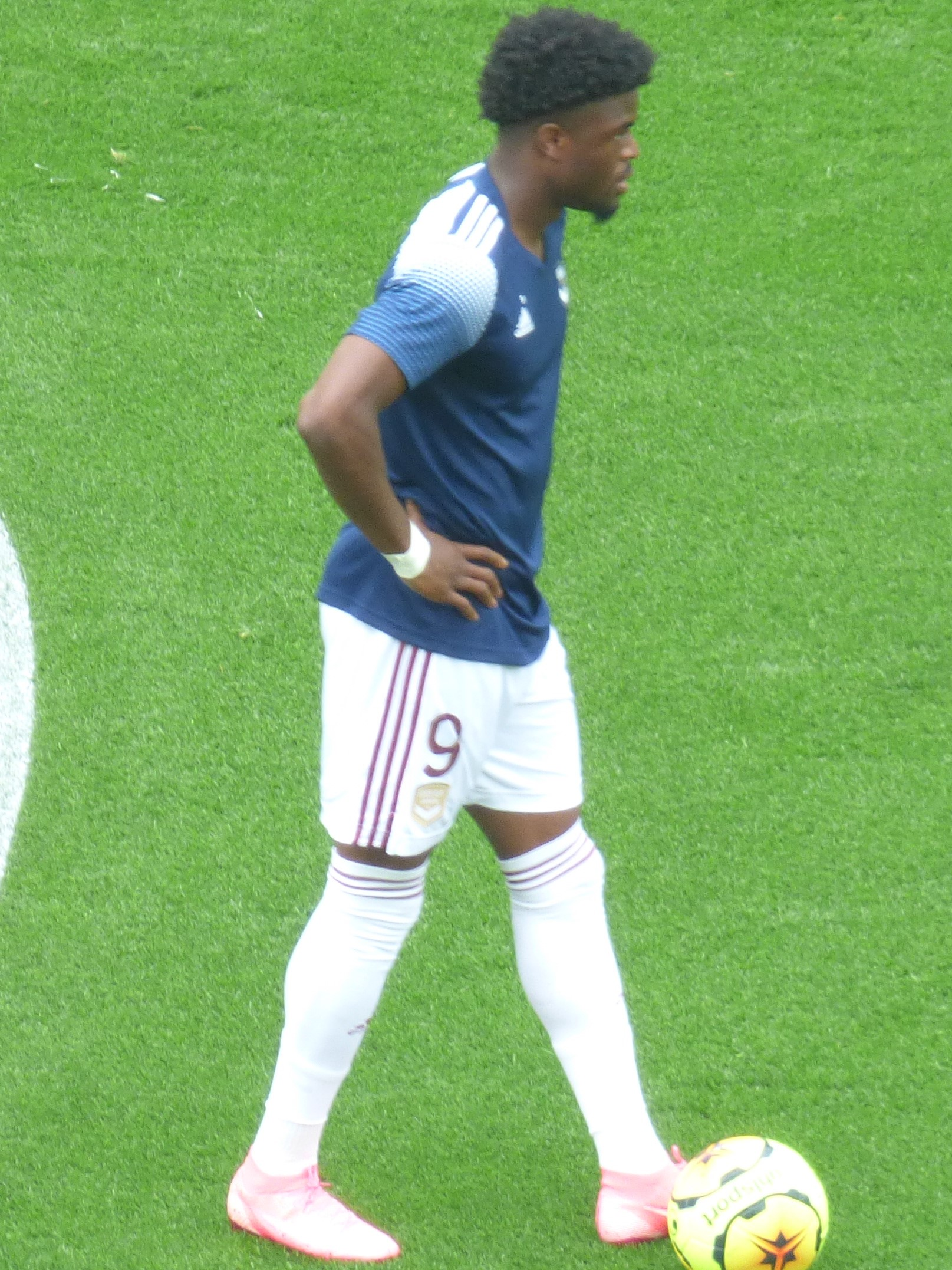
Maja playing for Bordeaux in 2020.

On 26 January 2019, Maja signed for French club Bordeaux on a four-and-a-half-year contract. He made his league debut on 17 February in a 2–1 home Derby de la Garonne win over Toulouse, starting and playing 67 minutes. On 20 April, he scored his first Ligue 1 goal in a 2–1 loss at Nîmes, but suffered a first-half left-knee injury that ended his season after seven games. On 3 December 2020, again against Nîmes, Maja scored his first professional hat-trick and also provided an assist in a 6–0 win.

==== Loan to Fulham ====
On 1 February 2021, transfer deadline day, Maja returned to English football with his former club in his youth, Fulham, now back in the Premier League though in a relegation battle, signing on loan for the remainder of the 2020–21 season. On 14 February, in his first start for the side, he scored both goals in a 2–0 victory at Everton.

==== Loan to Stoke City ====
On 31 January 2022, Maja joined Stoke City on loan for the remainder of the 2021–22 season. He made his debut on 5 February 2022, scoring in a 2–0 win against Wigan Athletic in the FA Cup. Maja made 17 appearances, for Stoke, scoring twice as they finished in 14th position.

==== Return to Bordeaux ====
In the 2022–23 Ligue 2 season, Maja played all 38 games and scored 16 goals, finishing fourth among top scorers, while Bordeaux finished third, missing out on promotion by one place and three points. He then turned down the option to renew for one year at the club. His goal tally included a hat-trick on 3 September in a 3–1 win away to Paris FC.

=== West Bromwich Albion ===
On 1 August 2023, Maja signed for Championship club West Bromwich Albion on a three-year deal. He made his debut 11 days later as a substitute in a 3–2 home win over Swansea City, With fitness and injury issues, he missed two months from September to November, then scored his first goal in a 2–1 loss to Leicester City at The Hawthorns on 2 December.

Maja was injured in the first half of his return to Sunderland on 9 December 2023, suffering ankle ligament breaks and being sidelined for four to five months.

He scored the first hat-trick of the 2024–25 Championship season in a 3–1 victory over QPR on 10 August 2024.

On 15 May 2026, the club said it had offered the player a new contract.

=== Le Havre ===
On 31 July 2026, Maja joined Ligue 1 side Le Havre on a one year deal, with the option of an additional year.

== International career ==
In August 2019, the Nigeria national team manager Gernot Rohr said he wanted Maja to represent the nation. He made his international debut on 10 September in a 2–2 friendly against Ukraine, replacing Victor Osimhen in added time.

== Career statistics ==
=== Club ===
As of match played 25 October 2026

Appearances and goals by club, season and competition
Club	Season	League			National cup (Note: Includes FA Cup, Coupe de France)		League cup (Note: Includes EFL Cup, Coupe de la Ligue)		Other		Total	
Club	Season	Division	Apps	Goals	Apps	Goals	Apps	Goals	Apps	Goals	Apps	Goals
Sunderland U23	2016–17	—			—		—		4 (Note: Appearances in EFL Trophy)	1	4	1
Sunderland	2016–17	Premier League	0	0	0	0	1	0	—		1	0
Sunderland	2017–18	Championship	17	1	1	0	0	0	—		18	1
Sunderland	2018–19	League One	24	15	3	0	1	0	2	1	30	16
Sunderland	Total		41	16	4	0	2	0	2	1	49	17
Bordeaux	2018–19	Ligue 1	7	1	0	0	0	0	—		7	1
Bordeaux	2019–20	Ligue 1	21	6	2	1	1	1	—		24	8
Bordeaux	2020–21	Ligue 1	17	2	0	0	—		—		17	2
Bordeaux	2021–22	Ligue 1	2	0	2	1	—		—		4	1
Bordeaux	2022–23	Ligue 2	38	16	3	1	—		—		41	17
Bordeaux	Total		85	25	7	3	1	1	—		93	29
Fulham (loan)	2020–21	Premier League	15	3	0	0	0	0	—		15	3
Stoke City (loan)	2021–22	Championship	15	1	2	1	0	0	—		17	2
West Bromwich Albion	2023–24	Championship	12	1	0	0	0	0	—		12	1
West Bromwich Albion	2024–25	Championship	26	12	0	0	0	0	—		26	12
West Bromwich Albion	2025–26	Championship	40	4	2	2	1	0	—		43	6
West Bromwich Albion	Total		78	17	2	2	1	0	0	0	81	19
Le Havre	2026–27	Ligue 1	8	3	0	0	—		—		8	3
Career total			238	63	15	6	4	1	6	2	263	72

=== International ===
As of match played 10 September 2019

Appearances and goals by national team and year
National team	Year	Apps	Goals
Nigeria	2019	1	0
Total		1	0

== Honours ==
Individual

- UNFP Ligue 2 Team of the Year: 2022–23
