= Mathias De Amorim =

Portuguese footballer (born 2004)

Personal information
- Date of birth: 10 December 2004 (age 21)
- Place of birth: Pessac, France
- Position: Midfielder

Team information
- Current team: Famalicão
- Number: 14

Youth career
- 2010–2014: CA Béglais
- 2014–2023: Bordeaux

Senior career*
Years	Team	Apps	(Gls)
2022–2024	Bordeaux B	23	(2)
2023–2024	Bordeaux	9	(0)
2024–	Famalicão	62	(5)

International career^{‡}
2023–2024	France U20	4	(0)
2025–	Portugal U21	11	(0)
- * Club domestic league appearances and goals as of 19:35, 17 October 2026 (UTC) ‡ National team caps and goals as of 19:35, 17 October 2026 (UTC)

Mathias De Amorim (born 10 December 2004) is a professional footballer who plays as a midfielder for Primeira Liga club Famalicão. Born in France, he currently represents Portugal at youth level.

== Club career ==
On 14 August 2023, De Amorim made his professional debut with Bordeaux, coming on as an 88th-minute substitute in a 1–0 Ligue 2 win over Concarneau. On 22 August, he signed his first professional contract, a deal until June 2026.

On 4 August 2025, De Amorim signed a four-year contract with Primeira Liga club Famalicão.

== International career ==
Born in France, De Amorim is of Portuguese descent. He has French and Portuguese nationality. On 31 August 2023, De Amorim received his first international call-up, an invitation for two matches with the France under-20s against Denmark. He made his debut in the first match on 9 September, a 2–2 draw. He switched to representing Portugal in 2025, making his debut at under-21 level in a 5–0 win over Poland on 14 June. In September, he was called up for a set of 2027 UEFA European Under-21 Championship qualification matches.
