= Lenny Pirringuel =

Footballer (born 2004)

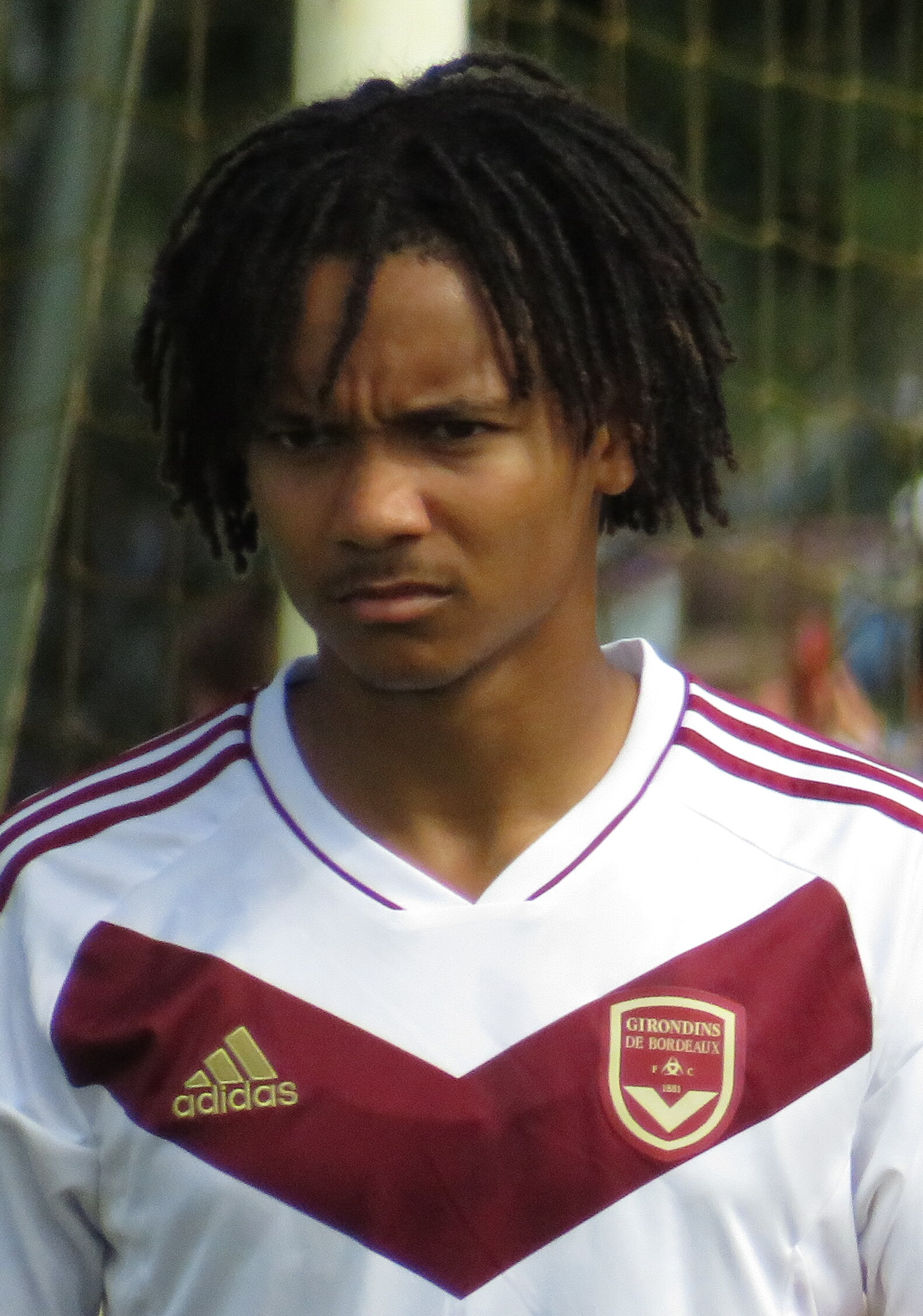

Personal information
- Full name: Lenny Seive Pirringuel
- Date of birth: 2 March 2004 (age 22)
- Place of birth: Talence, France
- Height: 1.70 m (5 ft 7 in)
- Position: Midfielder

Team information
- Current team: Saint-Priest
- Number: 23

Youth career
- 2010–2012: SC Cadaujac
- 2012–2013: Jeunesse Villenavaise
- 2013–2022: Bordeaux

Senior career*
Years	Team	Apps	(Gls)
2020–2024	Bordeaux B	34	(6)
2022–2024	Bordeaux	8	(1)
2023	→ Pau (loan)	5	(0)
2023	→ Pau B (loan)	2	(0)
2024–2026	Quevilly-Rouen	12	(0)
2026–	Saint-Priest	0	(0)

International career^{‡}
2019	France U16	3	(1)
2021–2022	France U18	11	(3)
2022	France U19	3	(1)
2024–	Benin	1	(0)
- * Club domestic league appearances and goals as of 23 June 2026 ‡ National team caps and goals as of 26 March 2024

Lenny Seive Pirringuel (born 2 March 2004) is a professional footballer who plays as a midfielder for Championnat National 1 club Saint-Priest. Born in France, he plays for the Benin national team.

== Club career ==
On 21 December 2020, Pirringuel signed his first professional contract with Bordeaux, a deal lasting until 2023. He became the youngest professional player in the history of the club, tied with Henri Saivet. On 27 August 2022, Pirringuel made his professional debut for the club in a 1–0 Ligue 2 loss to Guingamp. He scored his first goal for Bordeaux in a 1–1 league draw against Pau on 12 November 2022.

On 22 August 2023, Pirringuel joined Pau on a one-season loan, under the captaincy of Henri Saivet.

On 4 September 2024, Pirringuel joined Championnat National club Quevilly-Rouen.

== International career ==
Pirringuel is eligible to represent both France and Benin. As a French youth international, he has made appearances for the under-16, under-18, and under-19 sides. In 2022, he was part of the squad that won the Mediterranean Games.

Pirringuel made his debut for the senior Benin national team on 26 March 2024 in a friendly against Senegal.

== Personal life ==
Born in France, Pirringuel is Beninese by descent.

== Honours ==
France U18

- Mediterranean Games: 2022
