= Tijany Atallah =

Footballer (born 2003)

Personal information
- Date of birth: 12 March 2003 (age 23)
- Place of birth: Muret, France
- Height: 1.75 m (5 ft 9 in)
- Position: Defender

Youth career
- 2009–2013: US Venerquoise
- 2013–2017: Colomiers
- 2017–2018: Balma
- 2018–2022: Bordeaux

Senior career*
Years	Team	Apps	(Gls)
2019–2024	Bordeaux B	46	(0)
2022–2024	Bordeaux	0	(0)

International career
2019	France U17	1	(0)
2021–	Algeria U20	4	(0)
- * Club domestic league appearances and goals as of 27 June 2024

Tijany Atallah (born 12 March 2003) is a professional footballer who plays as a defender. Born in France, he is a youth international for Algeria.

== Early life ==
Tijany Atallah grew up in Vernet, Haute-Garonne, where he started playing football at the age of three. He joined Colomiers in 2013 before also joining the federal pôle espoirs of Castelmaurou two years later.

== Club career ==
After a one-year spell with Balma during the 2017–18 season, Atallah joined the Bordeaux academy in 2018 as an under-16. He made his professional debut for the club's senior team on 2 January 2022, starting as a center-back in a Coupe de France round of 32 game, a 3–0 away loss to Brest.

== International career ==
Atallah is a youth international for France, having played a friendly game against Italy in 2019 with the under-17. In 2021, he was selected with Algeria under-20s for the UNAF Tournament, where despite his side disappointing overall performance, he was among the Algerian revelations.

== Style of play ==
A versatile defender, Atallah is able to play as a center-back or on both flanks of the defense, and even as a defensive midfielder.
