= Logan Delaurier-Chaubet =

French footballer (born 2002)

Personal information
- Date of birth: 22 April 2002 (age 24)
- Place of birth: Saint-Jean-de-Verges, France
- Height: 1.74 m (5 ft 9 in)
- Position: Attacking midfielder

Team information
- Current team: Eupen
- Number: 22

Youth career
- 2009–2010: US Verniolle
- 2010–2015: EFC de L'Hers
- 2015–2016: FC Pamiers
- 2016–2017: Balma
- 2017–2021: Bordeaux

Senior career*
| Years | Team | Apps | (Gls) |
| 2019–2024 | Bordeaux B | 41 | (11) |
| 2022–2024 | Bordeaux | 21 | (2) |
| 2023–2024 | → Quevilly-Rouen (loan) | 31 | (4) |
| 2024–2025 | Almere City | 12 | (1) |
| 2025 | → Celje (loan) | 10 | (1) |
| 2025– | Eupen | 24 | (6) |

International career
| 2018 | France U16 | 4 | (1) |
| 2020 | France U18 | 1 | (0) |
- * Club domestic league appearances and goals as of 20 April 2026

Logan Delaurier-Chaubet (born 22 April 2002) is a French professional footballer who plays as an attacking midfielder for Belgian Challenger Pro League club Eupen.

== Club career ==
On 4 June 2020, Delaurier-Chaubet signed his first professional contract with Bordeaux, a three-year deal. After having played in three different seasons with the club's reserve side, he joined the first team in 2022, making his professional debut on 31 July 2022 as a starter in a 0–0 Ligue 2 draw against Valenciennes. On 4 August, Delaurier-Chaubet signed a contract extension, keeping him at Bordeaux until June 2026. On 13 August, he scored his first professional goal in a 1–0 win over Chamois Niortais.

On 12 July 2023, Delaurier-Chaubet joined Ligue 2 side Quevilly-Rouen on a season-long loan.

On 8 August 2024, Delaurier-Chaubet signed with Almere City in the Netherlands, joining as a free agent due to Bordeaux's bankruptcy. On 10 January 2025, he was loaned by Celje in Slovenia until the end of the season, with an option to buy.

On 5 August 2025, Delaurier-Chaubet moved to Eupen in Belgium on a two-season deal.

== International career ==
Delaurier-Chaubet was a France youth international. He made four appearances and scored one goal for the France U16s in 2018, and made one appearance for the France U18s in 2020.
