= 2016–17 FC Girondins de Bordeaux season =

Bordeaux
2016–17 season
- Chairman: Jean-Louis Triaud
- Manager: Jocelyn Gourvennec
- Stadium: Nouveau Stade de Bordeaux
- Ligue 1: 6th
- Coupe de France: Quarter-finals (knocked out by Angers)
- Coupe de la Ligue: Semi-finals (knocked out by Paris Saint-Germain)
- Top goalscorer: League: Diego Rolán (9); All: Gaëtan Laborde (13)
- Highest home attendance: 41,265 vs. Marseille (14 May 2017)
- Lowest home attendance: 5,738 vs. Dijon (31 January 2017)
Home colours	Away colours	Third colours

The 2016–17 FC Girondins de Bordeaux season was the 136th professional season of the club since its creation in 1881. The club competed in Ligue 1, the top tier of French football, as well as the Coupe de France and Coupe de la Ligue.

== Players ==
French teams are limited to four players without EU citizenship. Hence, the squad list includes only the principal nationality of each player; several non-European players on the squad have dual citizenship with an EU country. Also, players from the ACP countries—countries in Africa, the Caribbean, and the Pacific that are signatories to the Cotonou Agreement—are not counted against non-EU quotas due to the Kolpak ruling.

=== First-team squad ===
As of 10 August 2016.

Note: Flags indicate national team as defined under FIFA eligibility rules; some limited exceptions apply. Players may hold more than one non-FIFA nationality.

No.	Pos.	Nation	Player
1	GK	FRA	Paul Bernardoni
2	DF	SRB	Milan Gajić
3	DF	GER	Diego Contento
4	DF	SRB	Vukašin Jovanović (on loan from Zenit Saint Petersburg)
5	DF	FRA	Nicolas Pallois
6	DF	POL	Igor Lewczuk
7	FW	FRA	Jérémy Ménez
8	MF	URU	Mauro Arambarri
9	FW	URU	Diego Rolán
10	FW	CIV	Thomas Touré
11	MF	GUI	François Kamano
13	MF	FRA	Younés Kaabouni
14	MF	FRA	Jérémy Toulalan

No.	Pos.	Nation	Player
15	MF	MLI	Abdou Traoré
16	GK	FRA	Cédric Carrasso
17	MF	FRA	Adam Ounas
18	MF	CZE	Jaroslav Plašil (captain)
19	MF	FRA	Nicolas Maurice-Belay
20	DF	FRA	Youssouf Sabaly (on loan from Paris Saint-Germain)
21	DF	FRA	Théo Pellenard
23	MF	ARG	Valentin Vada
24	FW	FRA	Gaëtan Laborde
25	FW	BRA	Malcom
28	MF	ARG	Daniel Mancini
29	DF	FRA	Maxime Poundjé
30	GK	FRA	Jérôme Prior

=== Out on loan ===
Note: Flags indicate national team as defined under FIFA eligibility rules; some limited exceptions apply. Players may hold more than one non-FIFA nationality.

No.	Pos.	Nation	Player
—	DF	FRA	Frédéric Guilbert (on loan to SM Caen)
—	DF	CAF	Cédric Yambéré (on loan to APOEL)
—	DF	BRA	Pablo (on loan to Corinthians)

No.	Pos.	Nation	Player
—	MF	CMR	Kévin Soni (on loan to Pau FC)
—	FW	FRA	Enzo Crivelli (on loan to Bastia)
—	FW	SWE	Isaac Kiese Thelin (on loan to Anderlecht)

== Transfers ==
=== Transfers in ===
Date	Pos.	Player	Age	Moved from	Fee	Notes
1 July 2016	GK	(France) Paul Bernardoni	19	(France) Troyes	€3,000,000	
1 July 2016	MF	(France) Jérémy Toulalan	32	(France) AS Monaco	Free Transfer	
27 July 2016	MF	(Guinea) François Kamano	20	(France) Bastia	€3,000,000	
1 August 2016	FW	(France) Jérémy Ménez	29	(Italy) A.C. Milan	Free Transfer	
31 August 2016	DF	(Poland) Igor Lewczuk	31	(Poland) Legia Warsaw	€1,000,000	
26 January 2017	MF	(Argentina) Daniel Mancini	20	(Argentina) Newell's Old Boys	Undisclosed	
30 January 2017	MF	(Senegal) Younousse Sankharé	27	(France) Lille	€2,500,000	

=== Loans in ===
Date	Pos.	Player	Age	Loaned from	Return date	Notes
3 August 2016	DF	(France) Youssouf Sabaly	23	(France) Paris Saint-Germain	30 June 2017	
31 January 2017	DF	(Serbia) Vukašin Jovanović	20	(Russia) Zenit Saint Petersburg	30 June 2017	

=== Transfers out ===
Date	Pos.	Player	Age	Moved to	Fee	Notes
1 July 2016	MF	(France) Clément Chantôme	28	(France) Rennes	Free Transfer	
1 July 2016	FW	(Mali) Cheick Diabaté	28	(Turkey) Osmanlıspor	Free Transfer	
1 July 2016	FW	(Brazil) Jussiê	32	Unattached	Released	
4 August 2016	DF	(Senegal) Lamine Sané	29	(Germany) Werder Bremen	Free Transfer	
8 August 2016	MF	(Gabon) André Biyogo Poko	23	(Turkey) Karabükspor	Undisclosed	
30 January 2017	MF	(France) Grégory Sertic	27	(France) Marseille	€2,000,000	

=== Loans out ===
Date	Pos.	Player	Age	Loaned to	Return date	Notes
13 July 2016	DF	(Central African Republic) Cédric Yambéré	25	(Russia) Anzhi Makhachkala	31 December 2016	
3 August 2016	FW	(France) Enzo Crivelli	21	(France) Bastia	30 June 2017	
7 September 2016	MF	(Cameroon) Kévin Soni	18	(France) Pau FC	30 June 2017	
24 October 2016	DF	(France) Frédéric Guilbert	21	(France) SM Caen	30 June 2017	
5 January 2017	FW	(Sweden) Isaac Kiese Thelin	24	(Belgium) Anderlecht	29 August 2017	
24 January 2017	DF	(Central African Republic) Cédric Yambéré	26	(Cyprus) APOEL	30 June 2017	
27 January 2017	DF	(Brazil) Pablo	25	(Brazil) Corinthians	December 2017	

== Pre-season and friendlies ==
9 July 2016 Friendly	Bordeaux (France)	1–0	(France) Pau	Pau, France
18:30 CEST (UTC+02:00)		Report		Stadium: Stade du Hameau

16 July 2016 Friendly	Bordeaux (France)	1–2	(Italy) A.C. Milan	Agen, France
19:00 CEST (UTC+02:00)	Malcom 75'	Report	29', 38' Suso	Stadium: Stade Alfred Armandie; Attendance: 6,000

23 July 2016 Friendly	Bordeaux (France)	2–2	(Spain) Athletic Bilbao	Tarnos, France
17:30 CEST (UTC+02:00)	Crivelli 18', 20' (pen.)	Report	Viguera 44'; Guillermo 50'	Stadium: Parc des Sports Jean André Maye

30 July 2016 Friendly	Angers (France)	3–0	(France) Bordeaux	Barbezieux-Saint-Hilaire, France
16:00 CEST (UTC+02:00)		Report		Stadium: Stade Gilbut Santiago

3 August 2016 Friendly	Bordeaux (France)	3–1	(France) Lorient	Morbihan, France
18:00 CEST (UTC+02:00)	Rolán 10'; Malcom 20'; Vada 74'	Report	Carrasso 89' (o.g.)	Stadium: Stade Le Faouët

6 August 2016 Friendly	Bordeaux (France)	1–1	(Spain) Osasuna	Saint-Jean-de-Luz, France
17:00 CEST (UTC+02:00)	Guilbert 24'; Traoré (yellow card) 42'; Toulalan (yellow card) 75'	Report	I. García 5'; D. García (yellow card) 39'; U. García (yellow card) 45+2'; Tienza (red card) 51'; Romero (yellow card) 73'	Stadium: Stade Kéchiloa; Referee: Abdelatif Kherradji

== Competitions ==
=== Ligue 1 ===
==== League table ====
Pos	Team	Pld	W	D	L	GF	GA	GD	Pts	Qualification or relegation
4	Lyon	38	21	4	13	77	48	+29	67	Qualification for the Europa League group stage (Note: Since the winners of the 2016–17 Coupe de France and the 2016–17 Coupe de la Ligue, Paris Saint-Germain, qualified for European competition based on league position, the spot awarded to the Coupe de France winners (Europa League group stage) was passed to the fourth-placed team and the spot awarded to the Coupe de la Ligue winners (Europa League third qualifying round) was passed to the sixth-placed team. The fifth-placed team received the spot in Europa League third qualifying round originally designated to the fourth-placed team.)
5	Marseille	38	17	11	10	57	41	+16	62	Qualification for the Europa League third qualifying round
6	Bordeaux	38	15	14	9	53	43	+10	59	Qualification for the Europa League third qualifying round
7	Nantes	38	14	9	15	40	54	−14	51	
8	Saint-Étienne	38	12	14	12	41	42	−1	50	

Source: Ligue 1, Soccerway
Rules for classification: 1) Points; 2) Goal difference; 3) Goals scored; 4) Head-to-head goal difference; 5) Fairplay ranking.

==== Results summary ====
Overall								Home						Away					
Pld	W	D	L	GF	GA	GD	Pts	W	D	L	GF	GA	GD	W	D	L	GF	GA	GD
38	15	14	9	53	43	+10	59	9	6	4	27	19	+8	6	8	5	26	24	+2

Last updated: 20 May 2017.
Source: Competitive matches

==== Results by round ====
Round	1	2	3	4	5	6	7	8	9	10	11	12	13	14	15	16	17	18	19	20	21	22	23	24	25	26	27	28	29	30	31	32	33	34	35	36	37	38
Ground	H	A	H	A	H	A	H	A	A	H	A	H	A	H	A	H	H	A	H	A	H	A	H	A	H	H	A	H	A	H	A	H	A	H	A	A	H	A
Result	W	L	W	W	L	W	D	L	D	D	D	W	D	W	D	L	L	L	D	D	W	W	D	W	L	W	W	D	L	W	L	W	W	W	D	D	D	D
Position	2	14	8	4	5	4	5	6	6	9	9	5	6	7	5	5	5	5	10	10	9	7	7	7	7	7	5	5	6	6	6	5	5	4	5	6	6	6

Source: Ligue1
A = Away; H = Home; W = Win; D = Draw; L = Loss

==== Matches ====
Win Draw Loss

13 August 2016 1	Bordeaux	3–2	Saint-Étienne	Bordeaux
17:00 CEST (UTC+02:00)	Laborde 13'; Rolán 57'; Malcom 72'; Touré (yellow card) 80'	Report	Tannane (yellow card) 40'; Perrin (yellow card) 71'; Hamouma 81'; Søderlund 89'	Stadium: Nouveau Stade de Bordeaux; Attendance: 34,212; Referee: Lionel Jaffredo

20 August 2016 2	Toulouse	4–1	Bordeaux	Toulouse
20:00 CEST (UTC+02:00)	Diop 4'; Jullien 9'; Yago (yellow card) 37'; Braithwaite 67', 82'	Report	Ménez (yellow card) 3'; Ounas (yellow card) 66'; Pallois (yellow card) 79' (yellow-red card) 90+3'; Toulalan (yellow card) 81'; Kiese Thelin 90'	Stadium: Stadium Municipal; Attendance: 19,258; Referee: Tony Chapron

28 August 2016 3	Bordeaux	1–0	Nantes	Bordeaux
15:00 CEST (UTC+02:00)	Rolán 31'; Touré (yellow card) 45+1'; Sabaly (yellow card) 83'	Report	Diego Carlos (yellow card) 53'	Stadium: Nouveau Stade de Bordeaux; Attendance: 23,207; Referee: Benoît Bastien

10 September 2016 4	Lyon	1–3	Bordeaux	Lyon
17:00 CEST (UTC+02:00)	Kalulu 2'; Gonalons (red card) 67'; Rafael (yellow card) 75'; Ghezzal (yellow card) 85'	Report	Malcom 33'; Contento (yellow card) 60'; Sertic 71'; Ménez 90'	Stadium: Parc Olympique Lyonnais; Attendance: 40,976; Referee: Ruddy Buquet

17 September 2016 5	Bordeaux	0–1	Angers	Bordeaux
20:00 CEST (UTC+02:00)	Rolan (red card) 85'	Report	Thomas (yellow card) 9'; Toko Ekambi 38'; Capelle (yellow card) 45+1'; Andreu (yellow card) 54'; Michel (yellow card) 88'	Stadium: Nouveau Stade de Bordeaux; Attendance: 18,129; Referee: Olivier Thual

21 September 2016 6	Metz	0–3	Bordeaux	Metz
19:00 CEST (UTC+02:00)	Falette (yellow card) 56'; Signorino (yellow card) 69'	Report	Malcom 36'; Laborde 71'; Kiese Thelin 76' (pen.)	Stadium: Stade Saint-Symphorien; Attendance: 15,711; Referee: Mikaël Lesage

24 September 2016 7	Bordeaux	0–0	Caen	Bordeaux
20:00 CEST (UTC+02:00)		Report	Karamoh (yellow card) 25'; Bessat (yellow card) 90'	Stadium: Nouveau Stade de Bordeaux; Attendance: 17,476; Referee: Karim Abed

1 October 2016 8	Paris Saint-Germain	2–0	Bordeaux	Paris
17:00 CET (UTC+1)	Cavani 3', 30'; Meunier (yellow card) 51'	Report	Pallois (yellow card) 87'	Stadium: Parc des Princes; Attendance: 44,949; Referee: Antony Gautier

16 October 2016 9	Rennes	1–1	Bordeaux	Rennes
15:00 CET (UTC+1)	Contento 4' (o.g.); André (yellow card) 81'	Report	Pallois (yellow card) 45', (goal) 66'; Ounas (yellow card) 45'	Stadium: Roazhon Park; Attendance: 22,962; Referee: Benoît Millot

22 October 2016 10	Bordeaux	1–1	Nancy	Bordeaux
20:00 CET (UTC+1)	Ménez 55'; Ounas (yellow card) 56'	Report	Diarra (yellow card) 23'; Lenglet (yellow card) 32'; Marchetti (yellow card) 56'; Koura 74'	Stadium: Nouveau Stade de Bordeaux; Attendance: 20,853; Referee: Stéphane Lannoy

30 October 2016 11	Marseille	0–0	Bordeaux	Marseille
20:45 CET (UTC+1)	Fanni (yellow card) 57'	Report	Pallois (yellow card) 39'	Stadium: Stade Vélodrome; Attendance: 57,091; Referee: Nicolas Rainville

5 November 2016 12	Bordeaux	2–1	Lorient	Bordeaux
20:00 CET (UTC+1)	Kamano 28', (yellow card) 86'; Vada (yellow card) 61'; Rolan 73'; Ménez (yellow card) 78'	Report	Mara (yellow card) 54'; Prior 62' (o.g.); Guendouzi (yellow card) 71'; Mesloub (red card) 86'	Stadium: Nouveau Stade de Bordeaux; Attendance: 16,332; Referee: Karim Abed

20 November 2016 13	Guingamp	1–1	Bordeaux	Guingamp
15:00 CEST (UTC+01:00)	Jimmy Briand 90+3'	Report	Lewczuk 22'	Stadium: Stade de Roudourou; Attendance: 15,381; Referee: Tony Chapron

26 November 2016 14	Bordeaux	3–2	Dijon	Bordeaux
20:00 CET (UTC+1)	Rolan 48'; Kamano 88', 90+2'	Report	Abeid 44'; Tavares 62'; Lees-Melou (yellow card) 64'; Bouka Moutou (yellow card) 69'	Stadium: Nouveau Stade de Bordeaux; Attendance: 16,354; Referee: Bartolomeu Varela

30 November 2016 15	Bastia	1–1	Bordeaux	Bastia
19:00 CET (UTC+1)	Danic (yellow card) 40'; Thievy 49'; Leca (yellow card) 81'; Marange (red card) 82'	Report	Kiese Thelin (yellow card) 3'; Kamano (yellow card) 35'; Laborde 78'; Ménez (yellow card) 81'; Ounas (yellow card) 83'	Stadium: Stade Armand Cesari; Attendance: 11,421; Referee: Sébastien Desiage

3 December 2016 16	Bordeaux	0–1	Lille	Bordeaux
20:00 CET (UTC+1)	Laborde (yellow card) 34'; Sertic (yellow card) 61'	Report	Amadou (yellow card) 33'; De Préville 44'; Soumaoro (yellow card) 73'; Palmieri (yellow card) 90+1'	Stadium: Nouveau Stade de Bordeaux; Attendance: 19,250; Referee: Ruddy Buquet

10 December 2016 17	Bordeaux	0–4	Monaco	Bordeaux
17:00 CEST (UTC+2)	Laborde (yellow card) 51'; Pallois (yellow card) 62'; Plašil (yellow card) 63'; Ounas (red card) 68'	Report	Sidibé 2'; Falcao 4', 50', 64' (pen.); Mendy (yellow card) 84'	Stadium: Nouveau Stade de Bordeaux; Attendance: 38,803; Referee: Benoît Bastien

17 December 2016 18	Montpellier	4–0	Bordeaux	Bordeaux
20:00 CET (UTC+1)	Lasne 13'; Sessegnon 20', (yellow card) 66'; Deplagne (yellow card) 56'; Mounié 84'; Sylla 90+2'	Report	Lewczuk (yellow card) 19'; Ménez (red card) 38'; Sertic (yellow card) 66'	Stadium: Nouveau Stade de Bordeaux; Attendance: 9,841; Referee: Frank Schneider

21 December 2016 19	Bordeaux	0–0	Nice	Bordeaux
20:50 CET (UTC+1)	Toulalan (yellow card) 30'; Rolán (yellow card) 36'	Report	Le Marchand (yellow card) 23'; Koziello (yellow card) 80'; Balotelli (red card) 90+1'; Belhanda (red card) 90+5'	Stadium: Nouveau Stade de Bordeaux; Attendance: 27,614; Referee: (France) Mikael Lesage

14 January 2017 20	Angers	1–1	Bordeaux	Angers
20:00 CET (UTC+1)	Traoré 14', (yellow card) 41'; Tahrat (yellow card) 18'; Pavlović (yellow card) 66'; Tait (yellow card) 80'	Report	Rolán (yellow card) 21'; Santamaria 27' (o.g.); Toulalan (yellow card) 60'; Kamano (yellow card) 82'	Stadium: Stade Raymond Kopa; Attendance: 10,056; Referee: Johan Hamel

21 January 2017 21	Bordeaux	1–0	Toulouse	Bordeaux
20:00 CET (UTC+1)	Vada 1'; Plašil (yellow card) 59'; Malcom (yellow card) 76'	Report	Bodiger (red card) 43'; Moubandje (yellow card) 75'	Stadium: Nouveau Stade de Bordeaux; Attendance: 17,323; Referee: (France) François Letexier

28 January 2017 22	Nancy	0–2	Bordeaux	Tomblaine
20:00 CET (UTC+1)		Report	Pellenard (yellow card) 31'; Gajić (yellow card) 36'; Cuffaut 68' (o.g.); Malcom 88'	Stadium: Stade Marcel Picot; Attendance: 16,589; Referee: (France) Jérôme Brisard

4 February 2017 23	Bordeaux	1–1	Rennes	Bordeaux
20:00 CET (UTC+1)	Ménez 56'; Pallois (yellow card) 80'	Report	Baal (yellow card) 27'; Gourcuff 69'	Stadium: Nouveau Stade de Bordeaux; Attendance: 16,588; Referee: (France) Sébastien Desiage

7 February 2017 24	Caen	0–4	Bordeaux	Caen
19:00 CET (UTC+1)	Adéoti (yellow card) 51'	Report	Sabaly (yellow card) 10'; Rolán 11'; Kamano 23', 63'; Plašil 90'	Stadium: Stade Michel d'Ornano; Attendance: 15,542; Referee: (France) Benoît Bastien

10 February 2017 25	Bordeaux	0–3	Paris Saint-Germain	Bordeaux
20:45 CET (UTC+1)		Report	Cavani 6', 47'; Motta (yellow card) 21'; Di María 40'	Stadium: Matmut Atlantique; Attendance: 37,823; Referee: (France) Nicolas Rainville

19 February 2017 26	Bordeaux	3–0	Guingamp	Bordeaux
15:00 CET (UTC+1)	Kamano 13'; Vada (yellow card) 23'; Jovanović (yellow card) 26'; Pallois 43'; Laborde 71'	Report	Lévêque (yellow card) 19'; Martins Pereira (yellow card) 25' (yellow-red card) 59'; Bodmer (yellow card) 51'	Stadium: Matmut Atlantique; Attendance: 18,724; Referee: (France) Johan Hamel

25 February 2017 27	Lille	2–3	Bordeaux	Villeneuve-d'Ascq
20:00 CET (UTC+1)	Palmieri (yellow card) 36' (yellow-red card) 80'; Amadou (yellow card) 40'; Xeka (yellow card) 66' de Préville 66' (pen.); Eder 67'; Corchia (yellow card) 89'; Mavuba (yellow card) 90+2', (red card) 90+2'	Report	Vada 16', (yellow card) 42'; Ounas 78', 82'; Gajić (yellow card) 90+3'	Stadium: Stade Pierre-Mauroy; Attendance: 28,772; Referee: (France) Sébastien Desiage

3 March 2017 28	Bordeaux	1–1	Lyon	Bordeaux
20:45 CET (UTC+1)	Vada 16'; Gajić (yellow card) 26'; Jovanović (yellow card) 36'; Malcom (yellow card) 38'; Toulalan (yellow card) 57'; Pallois (yellow card) 90'	Report	Morel (yellow card) 4'; Gonalons (yellow card) 21'; Mammana 79'; Valbuena (yellow card) 85'; Ferri (yellow card) 90'	Stadium: Matmut Atlantique; Attendance: 31,511; Referee: (France) Frank Schneider

11 March 2017 29	Monaco	2–1	Bordeaux	Monaco
16:45 CET (UTC+1)	Fabinho (yellow card) 27'; Mbappé 68'; João Moutinho 74'	Report	Rolán 84'; Ménez (yellow card) 88'; Gajić (yellow card) 88'; Pallois (yellow card) 90+2'	Stadium: Stade Louis II; Attendance: 11,009; Referee: (France) Ruddy Buquet

18 March 2017 30	Bordeaux	5–1	Montpellier	Bordeaux
20:00 CET (UTC+1)	Rolán 25', 76'; Sankharé 29'; Vada 32' (pen.); Malcom 90+2'	Report	Boudebouz 47' (pen.); Congré (red card) 81'	Stadium: Matmut Atlantique; Attendance: 19,341; Referee: (France) Bartolomeu Varela

2 April 2017 31	Nice	2–1	Bordeaux	Nice
21:00 CET (UTC+1)	Balotelli 16' (pen.), (yellow card) 88'; Eysseric 27'; Souquet (yellow card) 40'; Cardinale (yellow card) 82'	Report	Laborde 9'; Jovanović (yellow card) 24'	Stadium: Allianz Riviera; Attendance: 19,669; Referee: (France) Benoît Bastien

8 April 2017 32	Bordeaux	3–0	Metz	Bordeaux
20:00 CET (UTC+1)	Sankharé (yellow card) 7'; Toulalan (yellow card) 11'; Malcom 14'; Vada 50' (pen.), 52'	Report	Cohade (yellow card) 31'; Mollet (yellow card) 90'; Assou-Ekotto (red card) 90+3'	Stadium: Matmut Atlantique; Attendance: 19,835; Referee: (France) Sébastien Desiage

16 April 2017 33	Nantes	0–1	Bordeaux	Nantes
15:00 CET (UTC+1)	Rongier (yellow card) 3'	Report	Pallois (yellow card) 37'; Sabaly (yellow card) 61'; Sankharé 65'; Gajić (yellow card) 78'	Stadium: Stade de la Beaujoire; Attendance: 26,373; Referee: François Letexier

22 April 2017 34	Bordeaux	2–0	Bastia	Bordeaux
20:00 CET (UTC+1)	Lewczuk (yellow card) 25'; Malcom 55'; Sankharé 69', (yellow card) 74'	Report	Mostefa (yellow card) 26'; El Kaoutari (yellow card) 68' (yellow-red card) 75'; Diallo (yellow card) 84'	Stadium: Matmut Atlantique; Attendance: 25,487; Referee: (France) Tony Chapron

30 April 2017 35	Dijon	0–0	Bordeaux	Dijon
17:00 CET (UTC+1)		Report	Lewczuk (yellow card) 25'	Stadium: Stade Gaston Gérard; Attendance: 12,596; Referee: (France) Bartolomeu Varela

5 May 2017 36	Saint-Étienne	2–2	Bordeaux	Saint-Étienne
20:45 CET (UTC+1)	Berić 45'; Pajot 64'; Veretout (yellow card) 70'	Report	Laborde (yellow card) 12', (goal) 50'; Ounas 42' (pen.); Contento (yellow card) 61'; Pallois (red card) 90+2'	Stadium: Stade Geoffroy-Guichard; Attendance: 30,606; Referee: (France) Frank Schneider

14 May 2017 37	Bordeaux	1–1	Marseille	Bordeaux
21:00 CET (UTC+1)	Rolán 2'; Vada (yellow card) 50'	Report	Hubočan (yellow card) 19'; Evra (yellow card) 33'; Gomis 60'	Stadium: Matmut Atlantique; Attendance: 41,265; Referee: (France) Clément Turpin

20 May 2017 38	Lorient	1–1	Bordeaux	Lorient
21:00 CET (UTC+1)	Le Goff (yellow card) 62' (goal) 69'; Philippoteaux (yellow card) 77'	Report	Sankharé 7'; Rolán (yellow card) 61'; Contento (yellow card) 68'; Ounas (yellow card) 78'	Stadium: Stade du Moustoir - Yves Allainmat; Attendance: 15,884; Referee: (France) Antony Gautier

=== Coupe de France ===
8 January 2017 Round of 64	Clermont Foot	0–1	Bordeaux	Clermont-Ferrand
14:15	Djellabi (yellow card) 42'; Ekobo (yellow card) 72'	Report	Malcom 87'	Stadium: Stade Gabriel Montpied; Attendance: 5,804; Referee: (France) Karim Abed

31 January 2017 Round of 32	Bordeaux	2–1	Dijon	Bordeaux
18:00	Malcom 53'; Laborde 90+2'	Report	Marié (yellow card) 54'; Diony 83'	Stadium: Matmut Atlantique; Attendance: 5,738; Referee: (France) Mikael Lesage

28 February 2017 Round of 16	Bordeaux	2–1	Lorient	Bordeaux
21:00	Laborde 61', 72'; Lewczuk (yellow card) 75'	Report	Moreira (yellow card) 19'; Jeannot 48', (yellow card) 54'; Wakaso (yellow card) 56'	Stadium: Matmut Atlantique; Attendance: 7,151; Referee: (France) Mikael Lesage

5 April 2017 Quarter-finals	Angers	2–1	Bordeaux	Angers
18:30	Bérigaud 8'; Pavlović (yellow card) 59'; N'Doye 67'	Report	Sankharé 18'; Ménez (yellow card) 34'; Jovanović (yellow card) 76'	Stadium: Stade Raymond Kopa; Attendance: 12,507; Referee: (France) Antony Gautier

=== Coupe de la Ligue ===
26 October 2016 Round of 32	LB Châteauroux	0–2	Bordeaux	Châteauroux
18:45		Report	Kamano 40'; Ounas 84'	Stadium: Stade Gaston Petit; Attendance: 9,787; Referee: (France) Stéphane Jochem

14 December 2016 Round of 16	Bordeaux	3–2	Nice	Bordeaux
18:45	Plašil 14'; Laborde 22', 55'; Gajić (yellow card) 53'; Vada (yellow card) 81'; Pellenard (yellow card) 83'	Report	Pléa 42'; Boscagli (yellow card) 79'; Balotelli 83' (pen.), (yellow card) 86'	Stadium: Matmut Atlantique; Attendance: 15,049; Referee: (France) François Letexier

11 January 2017 Quarter-finals	Bordeaux	3–2	Guingamp	Bordeaux
18:45	Kamano 16'; Laborde 36', 65', (yellow card) 41'	Report	Privat 12'; Deaux (yellow card) 43'; De Pauw (yellow card) 54'; Diallo (yellow card) 81'; Benezet 88'	Stadium: Matmut Atlantique; Attendance: 8,900; Referee: (France) Ruddy Buquet

24 January 2017 Semi-finals	Bordeaux	1–4	Paris Saint-Germain	Bordeaux
21:00	Rolán 32'	Report	Di María 19', 81'; Cavani 60', 74'	Stadium: Matmut Atlantique; Attendance: 28,862; Referee: (France) Clément Turpin

== Goalscorers ==
As of match played 8 June 2017

Place	Position	Nation	Number	Name	Ligue 1	Coupe de France	Coupe de la Ligue	Total
1	FW	(France)	24	Gaëtan Laborde	6	3	4	13
2	FW	(Uruguay)	9	Diego Rolán	9	0	1	10
3	FW	(Brazil)	25	Malcom	7	2	0	9
4	MF	(Guinea)	11	François Kamano	6	0	2	8
5	MF	(Argentina)	23	Valentin Vada	6	0	0	6
6	MF	(Senegal)	13	Younousse Sankharé	4	1	0	5
7	MF	(Algeria)	17	Adam Ounas	3	0	1	4
8	FW	(France)	7	Jérémy Ménez	3	0	0	3
9	FW	(Sweden)	12	Isaac Kiese Thelin	2	0	0	2
9	DF	(France)	5	Nicolas Pallois	2	0	0	2
9	MF	(Czech Republic)	18	Jaroslav Plašil	1	0	1	2
12	DF	(France)	27	Grégory Sertic	1	0	0	1
12	DF	(Poland)	6	Igor Lewczuk	1	0	0	1
				TOTALS	51	6	27	84
