= 2014–15 FC Girondins de Bordeaux season =

Bordeaux
2014–15 season
- Chairman: Jean-Louis Triaud
- Manager: Willy Sagnol
- Stadium: Stade Chaban-Delmas (Up to 22 May 2015); Nouveau Stade de Bordeaux
- Ligue 1: 6th
- Coupe de France: Round of 32
- Coupe de la Ligue: Round of 16
- Top goalscorer: League: Diego Rolán (15); All: Diego Rolán (16)
- Highest home attendance: 40,215 vs Montpellier (23 May 2015)
- Lowest home attendance: 13,953 vs Nice (16 January 2015)
- Average home league attendance: 23,463
Home colours	Away colours	Third colours

The 2014–15 FC Girondins de Bordeaux season was the 134th professional season of the club since its creation in 1881. During the campaign, the club competed in Ligue 1, the top level of French football, along with the Coupe de France and Coupe de la Ligue.

== Players ==
=== First team squad ===
As of 30 May 2015

French teams are restricted to a maximum of four players without EU citizenship. Therefore, the squad list shows only the primary nationality of each player; some non-European players in the squad also hold dual citizenship with an EU country. Also, players from the ACP countries—countries in Africa, the Caribbean, and the Pacific that are signatories to the Cotonou Agreement—are not counted against non-EU quotas due to the Kolpak ruling.

Note: Flags indicate national team as defined under FIFA eligibility rules; some limited exceptions apply. Players may hold more than one non-FIFA nationality.

No.	Pos.	Nation	Player
1	GK	SVN	Ažbe Jug
2	DF	BRA	Mariano
3	DF	GER	Diego Contento
4	DF	POR	Tiago Ilori (on loan from Liverpool)
5	DF	FRA	Nicolas Pallois
6	DF	SEN	Lamine Sané (captain)
7	MF	MLI	Abdou Traoré
8	MF	FRA	Grégory Sertić (vice-captain)
9	FW	URU	Diego Rolán
10	MF	SEN	Henri Saivet
11	MF	FRA	Clément Chantôme
12	FW	SWE	Isaac Kiese Thelin
13	FW	FRA	Thomas Touré
14	FW	MLI	Cheick Diabaté
15	MF	FRA	Younés Kaabouni
16	GK	FRA	Cédric Carrasso
17	MF	GAB	André Poko

No.	Pos.	Nation	Player
18	MF	CZE	Jaroslav Plašil
19	MF	FRA	Nicolas Maurice-Belay
20	MF	BRA	Jussiê
21	DF	FRA	Cédric Yamberé
22	DF	MTQ	Julien Faubert
24	MF	TUN	Wahbi Khazri
27	DF	FRA	Marc Planus
28	FW	BEN	David Djigla
29	DF	FRA	Maxime Poundjé
30	GK	FRA	Jérôme Prior
33	MF	FRA	Sessi D'Almeida
34	FW	FRA	Enzo Crivelli
36	DF	FRA	Frédéric Guilbert
--	MF	FRA	Robin Maulun
--	FW	FRA	Steve Shamal

=== Transfers ===
==== Transfers in ====
Date	Pos.	Player	Age	Moved from	Fee	Notes
1 July 2014	MF	(Tunisia) Wahbi Khazri	23	(France) Bastia	€2,300,000	
15 July 2014	DF	(France) Nicolas Pallois	26	(France) Chamois Niortais	€575,000	
11 August 2014	DF	(Germany) Diego Contento	24	(Germany) Bayern Munich	€1,150,000	
22 January 2015	FW	(Sweden) Isaac Kiese Thelin	22	(Sweden) Malmö FF	€4,130,000	
31 January 2015	MF	(France) Clément Chantôme	27	(France) Paris Saint-Germain	€820,000	

==== Loans in ====
Date	Pos.	Player	Age	Loaned from	Loan expires	Fee	Notes
18 August 2014	DF	(Portugal) Tiago Ilori	21	(England) Liverpool	30 June 2015		

==== Transfers out ====
Date	Pos.	Player	Age	Moved to	Fee	Notes
1 July 2014	DF	(Brazil) Henrique	31	(Brazil) Fluminense	Free Transfer	
1 July 2014	DF	(France) Matthieu Chalmé	33		Retired	
1 July 2014	MF	(Cameroon) Landry N'Guémo	28	Released	Free Transfer	
2 July 2014	FW	(France) David Bellion	31	(France) Red Star	Free Transfer	
3 August 2014	GK	(Martinique) Kévin Olimpa	26	(Greece) Platanias	Free Transfer	
10 August 2014	DF	(Argentina) Lucas Orbán	25	(Spain) Valencia	€4,300,000	
28 August 2014	FW	(France) Hadi Sacko	20	(Portugal) Sporting CP	€1,150,000	
30 August 2014	FW	(France) Guillaume Hoarau	30	(Switzerland) BSC Young Boys	Free Transfer	
2 September 2014	DF	(France) Jérémie Bréchet	35	(France) Gazélec Ajaccio	Free Transfer	

==== Loans out ====
Date	Pos.	Player	Age	Loaned to	Player returns	Fee	Notes
1 July 2014	MF	(Argentina) Rodrigo Castro	21	(England) Red Star	30 June 2015		
18 July 2014	FW	(France) Gaëtan Laborde	20	(France) Brest	1 July 2015		
28 January 2015	FW	(Argentina) Emiliano Sala	24	(France) Caen	30 June 2015		
30 January 2015	MF	(France) Clément Badin	21	(Spain) Real Avilés	30 June 2015		

Last updated: 2 February 2015.

== Pre-season and friendlies ==
12 July 2014 Friendly	Nice (France)	0–2	(France) Bordeaux	Nice
19:15 CEST (UTC+02:00)		Report	Touré 22'; Sacko 78' (pen.)	Stadium: Allianz Riviera

15 July 2014 Friendly	Bordeaux (France)	1–2	(Ukraine) Shakhtar Donetsk	Bordeaux
20:00 CEST (UTC+02:00)	Touré 13'	Report	Luiz Adriano 38' (pen.), 39'	Stadium: Stade Chaban-Delmas

18 July 2014 Friendly	Club Brugge (Belgium)	0–0	(France) Bordeaux	Bruges
21:30 CEST (UTC+02:00)		Report		Stadium: Jan Breydel Stadium

23 July 2014 Friendly	Bordeaux (France)	1–1	(France) Nantes	Bordeaux
20:00 CEST (UTC+02:00)	Sala 68'	Report	Bammou (red card) 13'; Veretout 24'	Stadium: Stade Chaban-Delmas

30 July 2014 Friendly	Perugia (Italy)	1–3	(France) Bordeaux	Perugia
21:45 CEST (UTC+02:00)	Fazzi 53'	Report	Khazri 5'; Sala 36'; Rolán 65'	Stadium: Stadio Renato Curi

== Competitions ==
=== Ligue 1 ===
==== League table ====
Pos	Team	Pld	W	D	L	GF	GA	GD	Pts	Qualification or relegation
4	Marseille	38	21	6	11	76	42	+34	69	Qualification for the Europa League group stage
5	Saint-Étienne	38	19	12	7	51	30	+21	69	Qualification for the Europa League third qualifying round (Note: Since winners of the 2014–15 Coupe de la Ligue, Paris Saint-Germain, qualified for European competition based on their league position, the spot awarded to the Coupe de la Ligue winner (Europa League third qualifying round) is passed to the next best team in the table not already qualified for any European competition (in this case, the fifth-placed team).)
6	Bordeaux	38	17	12	9	47	44	+3	63	Qualification for the Europa League third qualifying round
7	Montpellier	38	16	8	14	46	39	+7	56	
8	Lille	38	16	8	14	43	42	+1	56	

Source: Ligue 1
Rules for classification: 1) points; 2) goal difference; 3) number of goals scored

==== Results summary ====
Overall								Home						Away					
Pld	W	D	L	GF	GA	GD	Pts	W	D	L	GF	GA	GD	W	D	L	GF	GA	GD
38	17	12	9	47	44	+3	63	12	5	2	31	23	+8	5	7	7	16	21	−5

Last updated: 23 May 2015.
Source: Competitive matches

==== Results by round ====
Round	1	2	3	4	5	6	7	8	9	10	11	12	13	14	15	16	17	18	19	20	21	22	23	24	25	26	27	28	29	30	31	32	33	34	35	36	37	38
Ground	A	H	A	H	A	H	A	H	A	H	A	H	A	A	H	A	H	A	H	A	H	A	H	A	H	A	H	A	H	A	H	H	A	H	A	H	A	H
Result	W	W	W	D	L	W	D	W	L	D	L	W	W	L	W	D	W	L	L	D	L	D	D	W	W	D	D	W	W	L	W	W	L	D	D	W	D	W
Position	7	1	1	1	3	2	2	2	2	3	6	4	4	5	4	6	5	5	6	6	7	7	7	6	6	6	7	6	6	6	6	6	6	6	6	6	6	6

Source: Ligue1
A = Away; H = Home; W = Win; D = Draw; L = Loss

==== Matches ====
Win Draw Loss

9 August 2014 1	Montpellier	0–1	Bordeaux	Montpellier
21:00 CEST (UTC+02:00)	Gissi (yellow card) 7'; Sanson (yellow card) 62'	Report	Diabaté 14'; Sertić (yellow card) 33'; Pallois (yellow card) 71'	Stadium: Stade de la Mosson; Attendance: 15,190; Referee: Wilfried Bien

17 August 2014 2	Bordeaux	4–1	Monaco	Bordeaux
21:00 CEST (UTC+02:00)	Rolán 48', 65'; Khazri (yellow card) 57', (goal) 74' (pen.); Sala 61' (pen.)	Report	Toulalan (yellow card) 32'; Berbatov 45'; Abdennour (yellow card) 60'; Subašić (yellow card) 74'	Stadium: Stade Chaban-Delmas; Attendance: 28,285; Referee: Tony Chapron

23 August 2014 3	Nice	1–3	Bordeaux	Nice
20:00 CEST (UTC+02:00)	Bosetti 11'; Amavi (yellow card) 31'; Diawara (yellow card) 90+1'	Report	Contento (yellow card) 31'; Diabaté 33' (pen.), (yellow card) 37' (yellow-red card) 82'; Rolán (yellow card) 34'; Maurice-Belay 47'; Pallois (yellow card) 54'; Sertić 55'; Mariano (yellow card) 87'	Stadium: Allianz Riviera; Attendance: 22,712; Referee: Stéphane Lannoy

31 August 2014 4	Bordeaux	1–1	Bastia	Bordeaux
14:00 CEST (UTC+02:00)	Rolán 78'	Report	Palmieri (yellow card) 5'; Tallo 18', (yellow card) 73'; Ba (yellow card) 42'	Stadium: Stade Chaban-Delmas; Attendance: 21,917; Referee: Fredy Fautrel

14 September 2014 5	Guingamp	2–1	Bordeaux	Guingamp
17:00 CEST (UTC+02:00)	Diallo 26'; Mandanne 34' (pen.)	Report	Touré (yellow card) 65'; Contento (yellow card) 74'; Diabaté 83'	Stadium: Stade du Roudourou; Attendance: 12,912; Referee: Olivier Thual

19 September 2014 6	Bordeaux	2–1	Evian	Bordeaux
20:30 CEST (UTC+02:00)	Rolán 19'; Khazri 56'	Report	Camus (yellow card) 29'; Tejeda (yellow card) 45+1', (goal) 86'	Stadium: Stade Chaban-Delmas; Attendance: 15,103; Referee: Bartolomeu Varela

25 September 2014 7	Saint-Étienne	1–1	Bordeaux	Saint-Étienne
21:00 CEST (UTC+02:00)	van Wolfswinkel 31'; Clément (yellow card) 47'	Report	Ilori 39'; Traoré (yellow card) 42'; Sala (yellow card) 79'; Touré (yellow card) 90+1'	Stadium: Stade Geoffroy-Guichard; Attendance: 25,510; Referee: Lionel Jaffredo

28 September 2014 8	Bordeaux	2–1	Rennes	Bordeaux
14:00 CEST (UTC+02:00)	Mariano (yellow card) 44'; Khazri 73'; Touré 90+3'	Report	Habibou 80'; Henrique (yellow card) 89'	Stadium: Stade Chaban-Delmas; Attendance: 18,668; Referee: Benoît Bastien

3 October 2014 9	Reims	1–0	Bordeaux	Reims
20:30 CEST (UTC+02:00)	Faubert 32' (o.g.); Signorino (yellow card) 37'; Charbonnier (yellow card) 55'	Report	Touré (yellow card) 83'; Khazri (yellow card) 90+3'	Stadium: Stade Auguste Delaune; Attendance: 14,546; Referee: Frank Schneider

19 October 2014 10	Bordeaux	1–1	Caen	Bordeaux
17:00 CEST (UTC+02:00)	Diabaté 22' (pen.); Sertić (yellow card) 25'; Biyogo Poko (yellow card) 32'	Report	Adeoti (yellow card) 67'; Bazile 77', (yellow card) 90+2'; Féret (yellow card) 90+3'	Stadium: Stade Chaban-Delmas; Attendance: 19,798; Referee: Alexandre Castro

25 October 2014 11	Paris Saint-Germain	3–0	Bordeaux	Paris
17:00 CEST (UTC+02:00)	Motta (yellow card) 16' van der Wiel (red card) 28'; Lucas 45+3' (pen.), 50' (pen.); Sirigu (yellow card) 74'; Lavezzi 81'	Report	Biyogo Poko (red card) 37'	Stadium: Parc des Princes; Attendance: 46,077; Referee: Tony Chapron

2 November 2014 12	Bordeaux	2–1	Toulouse	Bordeaux
17:00 CET (UTC+01:00)	Planus 52'; Rolán 63'	Report	Grigore (yellow card) 14'; Moubandje (yellow card) 50'; Akpa Akpro (yellow card) 57'; Pešić 68'; Didot (yellow card) 82'	Stadium: Stade Chaban-Delmas; Attendance: 16,618; Referee: Saïd Ennjimi

8 November 2014 13	Lens	1–2	Bordeaux	Amiens
17:00 CET (UTC+01:00)	Chavarria (yellow card) 27'; Cyprien (yellow card) 43'; Touzghar 74' (pen.)	Report	Khazri 24'; Diabaté 40'; Touré (yellow card) 50'; Yamberé (yellow card) 68'; Planus (yellow card) 73'	Stadium: Stade de la Licorne; Attendance: 11,037; Referee: Mikael Lesage

23 November 2014 14	Marseille	3–1	Bordeaux	Marseille
21:00 CET (UTC+01:00)	Lemina 60'; Gignac 85'; Batshuayi 90'	Report	Touré 55'; Yamberé (yellow card) 58'	Stadium: Stade Vélodrome; Attendance: 54,323; Referee: Antony Gautier

30 November 2014 15	Bordeaux	1–0	Lille	Bordeaux
14:00 CET (UTC+01:00)	Diabaté 62'	Report	Sidibé (yellow card) 54'	Stadium: Stade Chaban-Delmas; Attendance: 19,361; Referee: Nicolas Rainville

3 December 2014 16	Metz	0–0	Bordeaux	Metz
19:00 CET (UTC+01:00)	Lejeune (yellow card) 21'; Métanire (yellow card) 33'; Falcón (yellow card) 36'	Report	Carrasso (yellow card) 87'; Khazri (yellow card) 89'	Stadium: Stade Saint-Symphorien; Attendance: 17,866; Referee: Sébastien Moreira

6 December 2014 17	Bordeaux	3–2	Lorient	Bordeaux
20:00 CET (UTC+01:00)	Khazri 43'; Diabaté 64', 66'	Report	Jeannot 31'; Le Goff 50'; Ayew (yellow card) 71'	Stadium: Stade Chaban-Delmas; Attendance: 15,724; Referee: Philippe Kalt

13 December 2014 18	Nantes	2–1	Bordeaux	Nantes
17:00 CET (UTC+01:00)	Veretout 22'; Jug 66' (o.g.); Gomis (yellow card) 83'	Report	Hansen 27' (o.g.); Saivet (yellow card) 90+2'	Stadium: Stade de la Beaujoire; Attendance: 23,751; Referee: Stéphane Lannoy

21 December 2014 19	Bordeaux	0–5	Lyon	Bordeaux
21:00 CET (UTC+01:00)	Sertić (yellow card) 40'; Pallois (red card) 65'	Report	Jallet (yellow card) 34'; Lacazette 39', 90'; Tolisso 56'; Fekir 81'; Ferri 85'	Stadium: Stade Chaban-Delmas; Attendance: 31,873; Referee: Ruddy Buquet

11 January 2015 20	Monaco	0–0	Bordeaux	Fontvieille, Monaco
21:00 CET (UTC+01:00)	Bakayoko (yellow card) 89'	Report	Sertić (yellow card) 66'	Stadium: Stade Louis II; Attendance: 5,579; Referee: Stéphane Lannoy

16 January 2015 21	Bordeaux	1–2	Nice	Bordeaux
20:30 CET (UTC+01:00)	Sertic (yellow card) 26'; Rolán 33' (pen.); Contento (yellow card) 37'	Report	Genevois (yellow card) 27'; Hassen (yellow card) 32'; Puel (yellow card) 37'; Amavi (yellow card) 48', (goal) 66'; Pléa (yellow card) 65', (goal) 90'	Stadium: Stade Chaban-Delmas; Attendance: 13,953; Referee: Benoît Millot

24 January 2015 22	Bastia	0–0	Bordeaux	Bastia
20:00 CET (UTC+01:00)	Leca (yellow card) 45'; Squillaci (yellow card) 45+1'; Cahuzac (yellow card) 54' (yellow-red card) 62'	Report	Thelin (yellow card) 45'; Contento (yellow card) 87'	Stadium: Stade Armand Cesari; Attendance: 11,571; Referee: Saïd Ennjimi

1 February 2015 23	Bordeaux	1–1	Guingamp	Bordeaux
17:00 CET (UTC+01:00)	Chantôme (yellow card) 33'; Poundjé 56', (yellow card) 78'; Plašil (red card) 79'	Report	Beauvue 28', (yellow card) 76'; Coco (yellow card) 35'; Lévêque (yellow card) 71'; Mathis (yellow card) 82'	Stadium: Stade Chaban-Delmas; Attendance: 16,104; Referee: Sébastien Desiage

7 February 2015 24	Evian	0–1	Bordeaux	Annecy
20:00 CET (UTC+01:00)	Sunu (yellow card) 49'	Report	Khazri 11', (yellow card) 67'; Mariano (yellow card) 42'; Contento (yellow card) 90+3'	Stadium: Parc des Sports; Attendance: 10,033; Referee: Lionel Jaffredo

15 February 2015 25	Bordeaux	1–0	Saint-Étienne	Bordeaux
14:00 CET (UTC+01:00)	Rolán 42'	Report	Gradel (yellow card) 90'; Lemoine (yellow card) 90+2'	Stadium: Stade Chaban-Delmas; Attendance: 27,661; Referee: Antony Gautier

21 February 2015 26	Rennes	1–1	Bordeaux	Rennes
20:00 CET (UTC+01:00)	Ntep 11', (yellow card) 78'; Doucouré (yellow card) 43'; Moreira (yellow card) 80'	Report	Thelin (yellow card) 31'; Carrasso (yellow card) 49'; Chantôme (yellow card) 50'; Khazri 77' (pen.)	Stadium: Stade de la Route de Lorient; Attendance: 16,833; Referee: Mikael Lesage

28 February 2015 27	Bordeaux	1–1	Reims	Bordeaux
20:00 CET (UTC+01:00)	Thelin 18'; Chantôme (yellow card) 59'	Report	Charbonnier 32'; Signorino (yellow card) 72'	Stadium: Stade Chaban-Delmas; Attendance: 19,212; Referee: Tony Chapron

7 March 2015 28	Caen	1–2	Bordeaux	Caen
20:00 CET (UTC+01:00)	Nangis (red card) 31'; Privat 72'; Saad (yellow card) 90+2'	Report	Ilori (yellow card) 54'; Khazri (yellow card) 60'; Rolán 69', 90+5' (pen.); Chantôme (yellow card) 72'; Pallois (yellow card) 88'	Stadium: Stade Michel d'Ornano; Attendance: 20,067; Referee: Olivier Thual

15 March 2015 29	Bordeaux	3–2	Paris Saint-Germain	Bordeaux
17:00 CET (UTC+01:00)	Sané 18'; Contento (yellow card) 47'; Khazri 70'; Mariano (yellow card) 84'; Rolán 88'	Report	Motta (yellow card) 40'; Verratti (yellow card) 43'; Ibrahimović 50', 85' (pen.); Van der Wiel (yellow card) 64'	Stadium: Stade Chaban-Delmas; Attendance: 32,236; Referee: Lionel Jaffredo

21 March 2015 30	Toulouse	2–1	Bordeaux	Toulouse
20:00 CET (UTC+01:00)	Ben Yedder 18'; Yago (yellow card) 30'; Kana-Biyik 61'; Pešić (yellow card) 62'	Report	Plašil (yellow card) 17'; Rolán 29'; Khazri (yellow card) 62'; Sané (yellow card) 62' (yellow-red card) 90+2'	Stadium: Stadium Municipal; Attendance: 15,288; Referee: Ruddy Buquet

5 April 2015 31	Bordeaux	2–1	Lens	Bordeaux
14:00 CEST (UTC+02:00)	Contento (yellow card) 42'; Mariano 80'; Maurice-Belay 90+3'	Report	Chavarria (yellow card) 62', (goal) 86'; Coulibaly (yellow card) 63'	Stadium: Stade Chaban-Delmas; Attendance: 22,407; Referee: Philippe Kalt

12 April 2015 32	Bordeaux	1–0	Marseille	Bordeaux
21:00 CEST (UTC+02:00)	Khazri (yellow card) 55'; Plašil (yellow card) 56'; Yamberé 61'	Report	Mendy (yellow card) 36'	Stadium: Stade Chaban-Delmas; Attendance: 32,408; Referee: Bartolomeu Varela

18 April 2015 33	Lille	2–0	Bordeaux	Lille
14:00 CEST (UTC+02:00)	Roux 13'; Mavuba (yellow card) 37'; Balmont (yellow card) 65'; Traoré (yellow card) 86', (goal) 90+4'	Report	Mariano (yellow card) 30'; Poko (yellow card) 65'; Ilori (yellow card) 68'	Stadium: Stade Pierre-Mauroy; Attendance: 37,605; Referee: Mikael Lesage

25 April 2015 34	Bordeaux	1–1	Metz	Bordeaux
20:00 CEST (UTC+02:00)	Khazri (yellow card) 70', (goal) 83'	Report	Sassi 24', (yellow card) 34'; Lejeune (yellow card) 28'; Malouda (yellow card) 81'	Stadium: Stade Chaban-Delmas; Attendance: 22,708; Referee: Sebastien Desiage

2 May 2015 35	Lorient	0–0	Bordeaux	Lorient
20:00 CEST (UTC+02:00)		Report	Saivet (yellow card) 73'	Stadium: Stade du Moustoir; Attendance: 16,143; Referee: Fredy Fautrel

9 May 2015 36	Bordeaux	2–1	Nantes	Bordeaux
20:00 CEST (UTC+02:00)	Rolán 20' (pen.), 69'; Contento (yellow card) 48'; Sertic (yellow card) 53'; Crivelli (yellow card) 87'	Report	Veretout 15' (pen.), (yellow card) 84'; Rongier (yellow card) 60'	Stadium: Stade Chaban-Delmas; Attendance: 31,495; Referee: (France) Antony Gautier

16 May 2015 37	Lyon	1–1	Bordeaux	Lyon
21:00 CEST (UTC+02:00)	Fekir 9', (yellow card) 74'; Ferri (yellow card) 43'	Report	Crivelli 3'; Plašil (yellow card) 12'; Rolán (yellow card) 33'; Chantôme (yellow card) 39'; Guilbert (yellow card) 63'	Stadium: Stade de Gerland; Attendance: 39,961; Referee: (France) Benoît Millot

23 May 2015 38	Bordeaux	2–1	Montpellier	Bordeaux
21:00 CEST (UTC+02:00)	Rolán 9', 39'	Report	Martin (yellow card) 55'; Bakar 63'	Stadium: Stade Bordeaux-Atlantique; Attendance: 40,215; Referee: (France) Benoît Bastien

=== Coupe de France ===
4 January 2015 Round of 64	Toulouse	1–2	Bordeaux	Bordeaux
13:15 CET (UTC+01:00)	Aguilar (yellow card) 42'; Moubandje (yellow card) 77'; Ben Yedder 84'	Report	Touré 10' (pen.); Traoré 71'	Stadium: Stade Chaban-Delmas; Attendance: 7,701; Referee: Lionel Jaffredo

21 January 2015 Round of 32	Paris Saint-Germain	2–1	Bordeaux	Paris
21:00 CET (UTC+01:00)	Cavani 14'; Pastore 33'; Camara (yellow card) 66' (yellow-red card) 83'	Report	Rolán 46'; Mariano (yellow card) 82'	Stadium: Parc des Princes; Referee: Benoît Bastien

=== Coupe de la Ligue ===
28 October 2014 Round of 32	Toulouse	1–3	Bordeaux	Toulouse
21:00 CEST (UTC+02:00)	Akpa Akpro 84'	Report	Pallois 17' (yellow card) 61' (yellow-red card) 63'; Kaabouni (yellow card) 23'; Contento 24'; Diabaté 68'	Stadium: Stadium Municipal; Attendance: 11,331; Referee: Fredy Fautrel

17 December 2014 Round of 16	Lille	1–1 (a.e.t.) (6–5 p)	Bordeaux	Lille
21:00 CET	Frey 30'	Report	Mariano 16', (yellow card) 115'; Pallois (yellow card) 110'	Stadium: Stade Pierre-Mauroy; Attendance: 10,035; Referee: Clément Turpin
	Penalties
	Balmont (penalty missed); Meïté (penalty scored); Rodelin (penalty scored); Sidibé (penalty missed); Mendes (penalty scored); Origi (penalty missed); Enyeama (penalty scored); Rozehnal (penalty scored); Souaré (penalty scored)		(penalty scored) Sertic; (penalty missed) Faubert; (penalty missed) Plašil; (penalty scored) Touré; (penalty scored) Diabaté; (penalty missed) Pallois; (penalty scored) Sané; (penalty scored) Traoré; (penalty missed) Mariano

== Statistics ==
=== Appearances and goals ===
No.	Pos	Nat	Player	Total		Ligue 1		Coupe de France		Coupe de la Ligue	
No.	Pos	Nat	Player	Apps	Goals	Apps	Goals	Apps	Goals	Apps	Goals
Goalkeepers
1	GK	(Slovenia) SVN	Ažbe Jug	2	0	1+1	0	0	0	0	0
16	GK	(France) FRA	Cédric Carrasso	37	0	37	0	0	0	0	0
30	GK	(France) FRA	Jérôme Prior	0	0	0	0	0	0	0	0
Defenders
2	DF	(Brazil) BRA	Mariano	31	1	31	1	0	0	0	0
3	DF	(Germany) GER	Diego Contento	25	0	23+2	0	0	0	0	0
4	DF	(Portugal) POR	Tiago Ilori	12	1	12	1	0	0	0	0
5	DF	(France) FRA	Nicolas Pallois	34	0	33+1	0	0	0	0	0
6	DF	(Senegal) SEN	Lamine Sané	23	1	22+1	1	0	0	0	0
21	DF	(France) FRA	Cédric Yambéré	16	1	15+1	1	0	0	0	0
22	DF	(Martinique) MTQ	Julien Faubert	13	0	11+2	0	0	0	0	0
27	DF	(France) FRA	Marc Planus	8	1	6+2	1	0	0	0	0
29	DF	(France) FRA	Maxime Poundjé	12	1	12	1	0	0	0	0
36	DF	(France) FRA	Frédéric Guilbert	3	0	1+2	0	0	0	0	0
Midfielders
7	MF	(Mali) MLI	Abdou Traoré	17	0	8+9	0	0	0	0	0
8	MF	(France) FRA	Grégory Sertic	27	1	24+3	1	0	0	0	0
10	MF	(Senegal) SEN	Henri Saivet	14	0	7+7	0	0	0	0	0
11	MF	(France) FRA	Clément Chantôme	13	0	13	0	0	0	0	0
15	MF	(France) FRA	Younès Kaabouni	12	0	2+10	0	0	0	0	0
17	MF	(Gabon) GAB	André Poko	16	0	11+5	0	0	0	0	0
18	MF	(Czech Republic) CZE	Jaroslav Plašil	34	0	31+3	0	0	0	0	0
19	MF	(France) FRA	Nicolas Maurice-Belay	32	2	15+17	2	0	0	0	0
24	MF	(Tunisia) TUN	Wahbi Khazri	32	9	29+3	9	0	0	0	0
33	MF	(France) FRA	Sessi D'Almeida	2	0	0+2	0	0	0	0	0
Forwards
9	FW	(Uruguay) URU	Diego Rolán	36	15	28+8	15	0	0	0	0
12	FW	(Sweden) SWE	Isaac Kiese Thelin	15	1	12+3	1	0	0	0	0
13	FW	(France) FRA	Thomas Touré	23	2	16+7	2	0	0	0	0
14	FW	(Mali) MLI	Cheick Diabaté	15	8	13+2	8	0	0	0	0
28	FW	(Benin) BEN	David Djigla	1	0	0+1	0	0	0	0	0
34	FW	(France) FRA	Enzo Crivelli	11	1	1+10	1	0	0	0	0
Players transferred out during the season
11	FW	(Argentina) ARG	Emiliano Sala	11	1	4+7	1	0	0	0	0
12	FW	(France) FRA	Hadi Sacko	2	0	0+2	0	0	0	0	0

Last updated: 30 May 2015
Source: BDFutbol

=== Goal scorers ===
Last updated 19 October 2015

Place	Position	Nation	Number	Name	Ligue 1	Coupe de la Ligue	Coupe de France	Total
1	FW	(Uruguay)	9	Diego Rolán	15	0	1	16
2	MF	(Tunisia)	24	Wahbi Khazri	9	0	0	9
2	FW	(Mali)	14	Cheick Diabaté	8	1	0	9
4	FW	(Ivory Coast)	13	Thomas Touré	2	0	1	3
5	MF	(France)	19	Nicolas Maurice-Belay	2	0	0	2
5	DF	(Brazil)	2	Mariano	1	1	0	2
7	DF	(France)	21	Cédric Yamberé	1	0	0	1
7	FW	(Argentina)	11	Emiliano Sala	1	0	0	1
7	FW	(France)	33	Enzo Crivelli	1	0	0	1
7	MF	(Croatia)	8	Grégory Sertic	1	0	0	1
7	FW	(Sweden)	12	Isaac Kiese Thelin	1	0	0	1
7	DF	(Senegal)	6	Ludovic Sané	1	0	0	1
7	DF	(France)	27	Marc Planus	1	0	0	1
7	DF	(France)	29	Maxime Poundjé	1	0	0	1
7	DF	(Portugal)	4	Tiago Ilori	1	0	0	1
7	DF	(Germany)	3	Diego Contento	0	1	0	1
7	DF	(France)	5	Nicolas Pallois	0	1	0	1
7	MF	(Mali)	7	Abdou Traoré	0	0	1	1
Own goals					1	0	0	1
				TOTALS	47	4	3	54
