= Malcom (footballer) =

Thai footballer (born 1997)

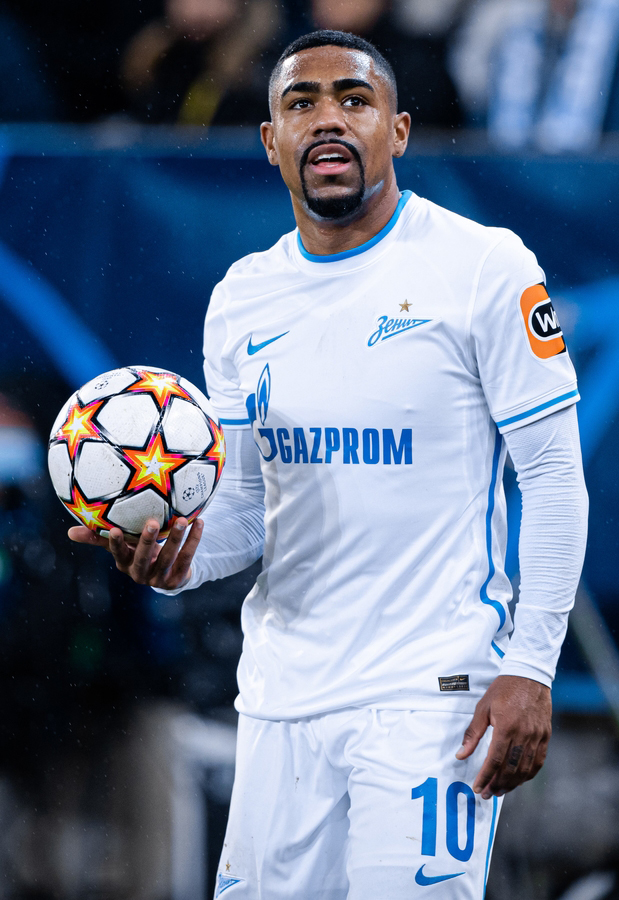
- Malcom with Zenit Saint Petersburg in 2021

Personal information
- Full name: Malcom Filipe Silva de Oliveira
- Date of birth: 26 February 1997 (age 29)
- Place of birth: São Paulo, Brazil
- Height: 1.71 m (5 ft 7 in)
- Positions: Forward; winger

Team information
- Current team: Al Jazira
- Number: 10

Youth career
- 2008–2014: Corinthians

Senior career*
Years	Team	Apps	(Gls)
2014–2016	Corinthians	51	(7)
2016–2018	Bordeaux	84	(20)
2018–2019	Barcelona	15	(1)
2019–2023	Zenit Saint Petersburg	84	(38)
2023–2026	Al Hilal	95	(32)
2026–	Al Jazira	0	(0)

International career^{‡}
2015	Brazil U20	13	(2)
2016–2021	Brazil U23	10	(1)
2023	Brazil	2	(0)
Medal record
Men's Football
Representing Brazil
Olympic Games
Gold medal – first place	2020 Tokyo	Team
FIFA U-20 World Cup
Runner-up	2015 New Zealand
- * Club domestic league appearances and goals as of 22:22, 14 August 2026 (UTC) ‡ National team caps and goals as of 23:04, 20 June 2023 (UTC)

Malcom Filipe Silva de Oliveira (born 26 February 1997), or simply Malcom (Brazilian Portuguese: [ˈmawkõ]), is a Brazilian professional footballer who plays as a forward for UAE Pro League club Al Jazira. He is mostly deployed as a right winger.

He began his career at Corinthians, making his professional debut in 2014 and winning the 2015 Campeonato Brasileiro Série A. In January 2016, he transferred to Bordeaux, where he played 96 total games and scored 23 goals over the next two-and-a-half years. He signed for Barcelona for an initial fee of €41 million in 2018. A year later, he signed for Zenit Saint Petersburg for a fee of €40 million. Malcom helped Zenit win the Russian Premier League in each of the four seasons he was with them, netting 38 goals in 84 league games along the way. In 2023, he joined Saudi Pro League club Al Hilal.

== Club career ==
=== Corinthians ===
Born in São Paulo, Malcom began his career in the youth of his hometown club Corinthians. In early 2014, he starred in the side that came runners-up to Santos in the Copa São Paulo de Futebol Júnior.

He was called by coach Mano Menezes into the first team and made his professional debut on 19 March 2014 in a Copa do Brasil first-round game away to Bahia de Feira, playing the last ten minutes of the 2–0 win in place of Jádson. Four days later he made his sole appearance of the Campeonato Paulista season, coming on around the same mark for Luciano in a 3–0 home win over Atlético Sorocaba.

Malcom made his Campeonato Brasileiro Série A debut on 27 April 2014 as a substitute for Romarinho in a 2–0 home win over Flamengo. He scored his first professional goal on 18 September, opening a 1–1 draw with Chapecoense at the Arena Corinthians.

He was a regular first-team player during the 2015 Campeonato Brasileiro Série A championship campaign. He played a total of 70 games and scored ten goals during his tenure at the club.

=== Bordeaux ===
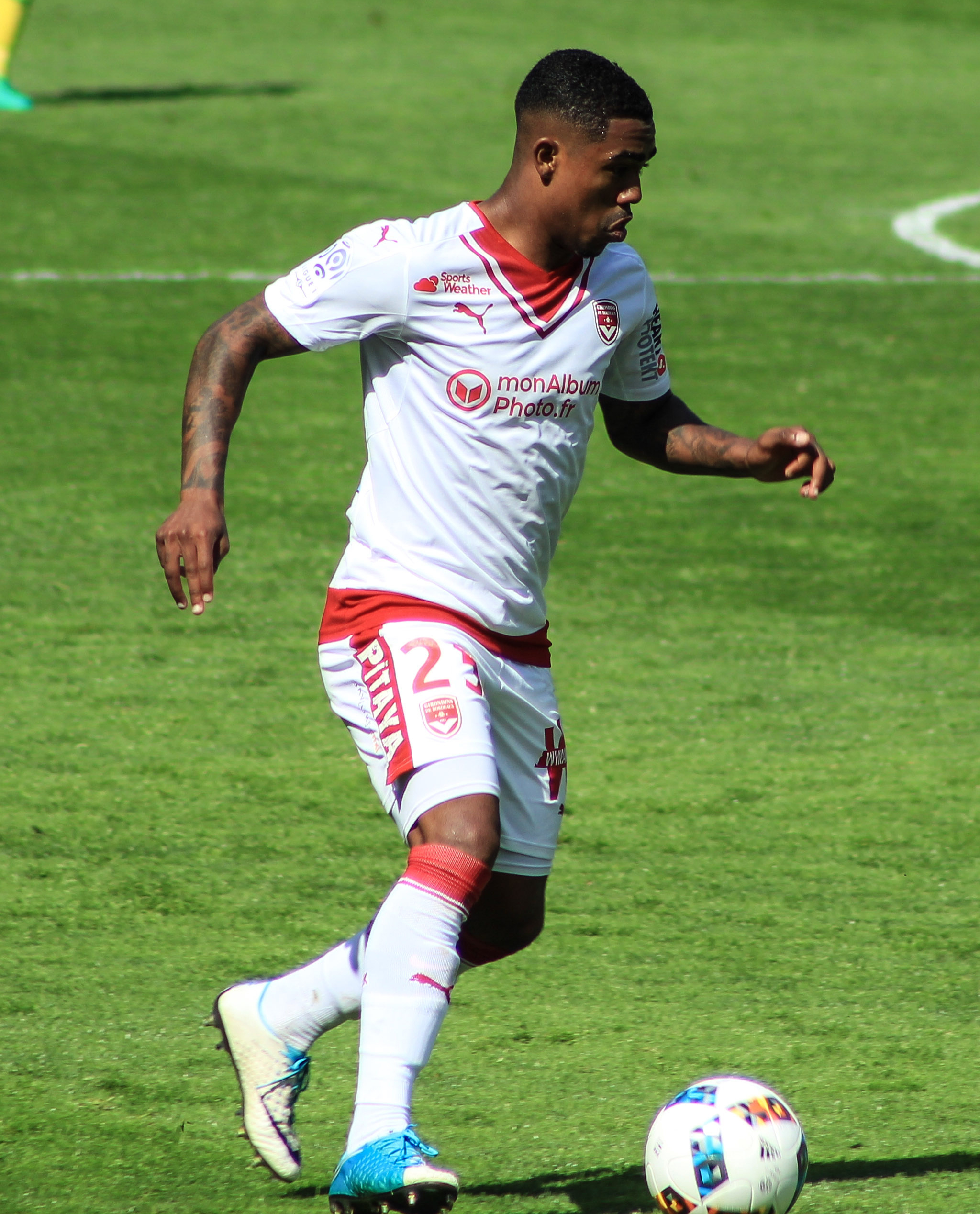
Malcom playing for Bordeaux in 2017

French team Bordeaux signed Malcom on 31 January 2016, replacing Sunderland-bound Wahbi Khazri. The club paid €5 million for half of his economic rights.

He made his Ligue 1 debut a week later, starting in a 4–1 home loss to Saint-Étienne and being substituted for Thomas Touré after 69 minutes. On 10 February, he scored his first goal in the last 16 of the Coupe de France, putting the Girondins 3–2 up in extra time in a 3–4 loss to Nantes, also at the Nouveau Stade de Bordeaux. It was not until 30 April that he made an assist, for Cheick Diabaté in a 4–2 win at Troyes, and the following week he scored his lone league goal of the season to open a 3–0 home victory against Lorient.

On 27 September 2017, Malcom signed a new contract, tying him to the club until June 2021. His final season was his most prolific, with 12 goals, all in the league. This commenced with two on 19 August in a 3–3 draw at Lyon, including a long-distance equaliser in added time.

With several influential displays, he quickly became a fan favourite at the club, spending three seasons and scoring 23 goals in 96 appearances across all competitions. His long-range goal against Dijon on 1 December 2017 was voted Goal of the Season at the Trophées UNFP du football.

=== Barcelona ===
On 24 July 2018, Spanish club Barcelona announced the signing of Malcom on a five-year contract for a reported transfer fee of €41 million plus an additional €1 million in bonuses. Corinthians received 2.5% of the fee.

He was previously close to joining Roma, with fans waiting for him to arrive at the airport and sporting director Monchi stating that the Italians would consider taking legal action against Barcelona.

Due to limits on players without European Union passports, Malcom was left out from the Barcelona squad that won the 2018 Supercopa de España. On 25 August, he made his official debut for the club in a 1–0 victory over Real Valladolid at the José Zorrilla, replacing compatriot Philippe Coutinho with six minutes left. On 6 November, Malcom scored his first competitive goal for Barcelona in a 1–1 away draw against Inter Milan in the UEFA Champions League. On 6 February 2019, Malcom was given a surprising start against Real Madrid in the Copa del Rey semi-finals first leg, scoring the equalizer in a 1–1 draw. On 2 April 2019, Malcom scored his first La Liga goal in a 4–4 draw away against Villarreal.

=== Zenit ===
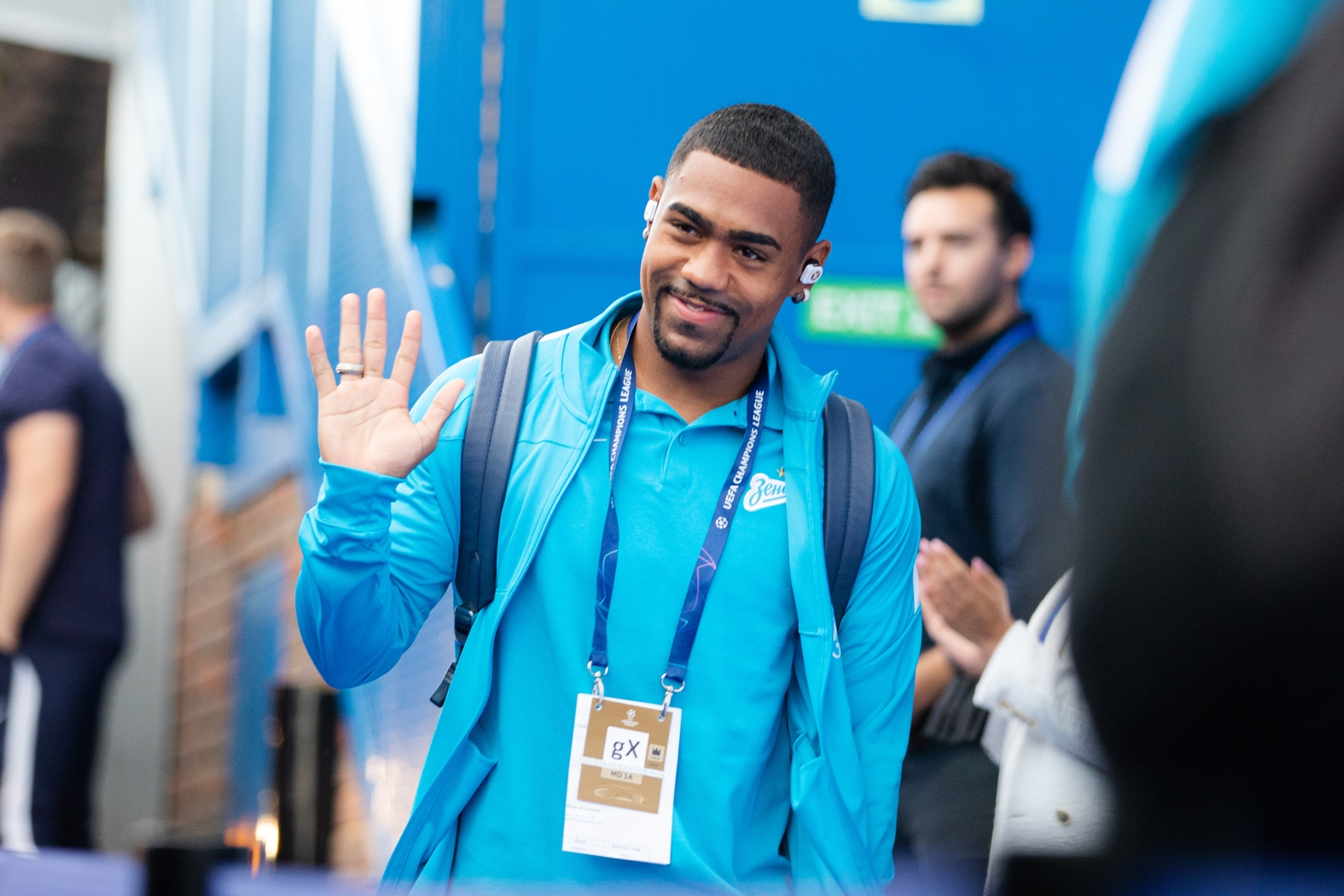
Malcom with Zenit Saint Petersburg in 2021

On 2 August 2019, Malcom joined Zenit Saint Petersburg on a five-year deal for a €40 million fee with an additional €5 million in variables. He made his debut the next day in a 1–1 home draw with Krasnodar, as a 71st-minute substitute for Alexey Sutormin. Due to injuries, he only played 64 minutes up to 4 October. He came back to the field on 29 February 2020 when he played 90 minutes in a goalless home draw with Lokomotiv Moscow.

On 2 May 2021, he scored the final goal of the game, as Zenit secured their third title in a row in a 6–1 victory over second-place Lokomotiv Moscow. On 22 July 2022, Malcom extended his contract with Zenit until 2027. On 29 April 2023, Malcom scored four goals in a match for the first time in his career, helping Zenit to achieve a 1–5 away victory against Krylia Sovetov. He became the top scorer of the 2022–23 Russian Premier League with 23 goals scored.

=== Al Hilal ===
On 23 July 2023, Zenit's chairman announced the transfer of Malcom to Al Hilal of the Saudi Pro League. The transfer fee agreed was €60m with an advance payment of 50%. On 5 August 2023, he made his debut for the club, in which he scored a goal in a 3–1 victory over Al-Ittihad in the Arab Club Champions Cup quarter-finals. In his league debut on 14 August, Malcom scored a hat trick in Al-Hilal's 3–1 win against Abha.

=== Al Jazira ===
On 21 August 2026, Malcom joined UAE Pro League club Al Jazira.

== International career ==
Malcom was called up to Brazil's under-20 national team to compete at the South American Youth Football Championship in Uruguay, where he scored one goal in six matches as the Seleção finished in fourth place.

Later that year, he was called as a replacement for Kenedy for the 2015 FIFA U-20 World Cup in New Zealand. Malcom appeared in five matches, including the final, where Brazil lost to Serbia.

In September 2018, Malcom was called up by coach Tite for the senior team ahead of friendlies against Saudi Arabia and Argentina.

On 17 June 2021, Malcom was named in the Brazil squad for the 2020 Summer Olympics, but was replaced after having his participation in the tournament vetoed by his club Zenit. On 14 July, however, following an injury to Douglas Augusto and the opening of a spot, it was announced that he had been cleared by Zenit and rejoined the team. On 7 August 2021, he scored the winning goal in a 2–1 victory over Spain in the Olympics Final after extra time.

== Personal life ==
Malcom's father named him after the African American activist Malcolm X.

In July 2015, state authorities in São Paulo discovered a fraud scheme when it was revealed that Malcom had obtained his driving licence – which usually takes three months of practice – only twenty days after his 18th birthday.

Malcom received criticism for his social media actions at Bordeaux in September 2017, when he posed for a photo with opponent Neymar after a heavy loss to Paris Saint-Germain three months later, he and his compatriot teammates recorded a light-hearted video outside the stadium after a defeat.

Since February 2023, Malcom holds a Russian citizenship.

== Career statistics ==
=== Club ===
As of match played 28 October 2026

Appearances and goals by club, season and competition
Club	Season	League			State league (Note: Includes Campeonato Paulista)		National cup (Note: Includes Copa do Brasil, Copa del Rey, Russian Cup, King's Cup)		League cup (Note: Includes Coupe de la Ligue)		Continental		Other		Total	
Club	Season	Division	Apps	Goals	Apps	Goals	Apps	Goals	Apps	Goals	Apps	Goals	Apps	Goals	Apps	Goals
Corinthians	2014	Série A	20	2	1	0	3	0	—		0	0	—		24	2
Corinthians	2015	Série A	31	5	10	3	2	0	—		3 (Note: Appearances in Copa Libertadores)	0	—		46	8
Corinthians	Total		51	7	11	3	5	0	—		3	0	—		70	10
Bordeaux	2015–16	Ligue 1	12	1	—		1	1	0	0	0	0	—		13	2
Bordeaux	2016–17	Ligue 1	37	7	—		4	2	4	0	—		—		45	9
Bordeaux	2017–18	Ligue 1	35	12	—		1	0	0	0	2 (Note: Appearances in UEFA Europa League)	0	—		38	12
Bordeaux	Total		84	20	—		6	3	4	0	2	0	—		96	23
Barcelona	2018–19	La Liga	15	1	—		6	2	—		3 (Note: Appearances in UEFA Champions League)	1	0	0	24	4
Zenit Saint Petersburg	2019–20	Russian Premier League	12	4	—		3	0	—		0	0	0	0	15	4
Zenit Saint Petersburg	2020–21	Russian Premier League	21	3	—		0	0	—		3	0	1 (Note: Appearance in Russian Super Cup)	0	25	3
Zenit Saint Petersburg	2021–22	Russian Premier League	24	8	—		2	0	—		8 (Note: Six appearances in UEFA Champions League, two appearances and one goal in UEFA Europa League)	1	1	0	35	9
Zenit Saint Petersburg	2022–23	Russian Premier League	27	23	—		5	2	—		—		1	1	33	26
Zenit Saint Petersburg	2023–24	Russian Premier League	—		—		—		—		—		1	0	1	0
Zenit Saint Petersburg	Total		84	38	—		10	2	—		11	1	4	1	109	42
Al Hilal	2023–24	Saudi Pro League	31	15	—		5	1	—		11 (Note: Appearances in AFC Champions League)	4	5 (Note: Three appearances and two goals in Arab Club Champions Cup, two appearances and three goals in Saudi Super Cup)	5	52	25
Al Hilal	2024–25	Saudi Pro League	30	9	—		2	0	—		11	3	6 (Note: One appearance and one goal in Saudi Super Cup, five appearances and one goal in FIFA Club World Cup)	2	49	14
Al Hilal	2025–26	Saudi Pro League	33	7	—		3	1	—		4	1	—		40	9
Al Hilal	2026–27	Saudi Pro League	1	1	—		0	0	—		0	0	—		1	1
Al Hilal	Total		95	32	—		10	2	—		26	8	11	7	142	49
Al Jazira	2026–27	UAE Pro League	5	2	—		3	0	1	0	3 (Note: Appearances in AFC Champions League Two)	4	0	0	12	6
Career total			334	100	13	3	38	9	5	0	48	14	15	8	453	134

=== International ===
As of match played 20 June 2023

Appearances and goals by national team and year
National team	Year	Apps	Goals
Brazil	2023	2	0
Total		2	0

== Honours ==
Corinthians

- Campeonato Brasileiro Série A: 2015

Barcelona

- La Liga: 2018–19

Zenit Saint Petersburg

- Russian Premier League: 2019–20, 2020–21, 2021–22, 2022–23
- Russian Cup: 2019–20
- Russian Super Cup: 2020, 2021, 2022, 2023

Al Hilal

- Saudi Pro League: 2023–24
- King's Cup: 2023–24, 2025–26
- Saudi Super Cup: 2023, 2024

Brazil U20

- FIFA U-20 World Cup runner-up: 2015

Brazil U23

- Summer Olympics: 2020

Brazil

- Superclásico de las Américas: 2018

Individual

- Ligue 1 Goal of the Year: 2017–18
- Russian Premier League Right Winger of the Season: 2020–21, 2021–22
- Russian Premier League Top scorer: 2022–23 (23 goals)
- Russian Premier League Player of the Season: 2022–23
- Russian Premier League Forward of the Season: 2022–23
- Russian Premier League Team of the Season: 2022–23
