= Younès Kaabouni =

French footballer (born 1995)

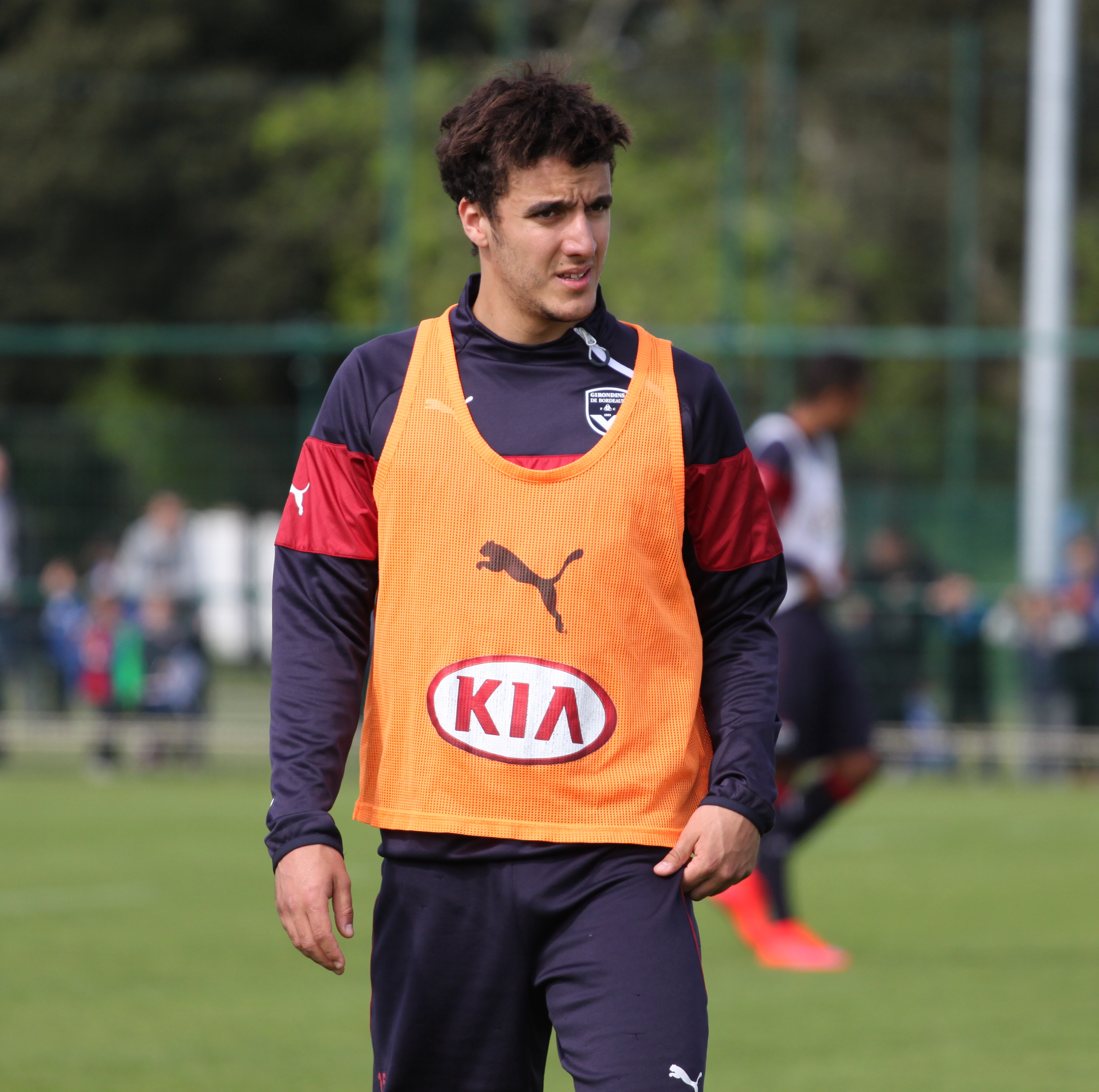
- Kaabouni in training with Bordeaux in 2015

Personal information
- Date of birth: 23 May 1995 (age 31)
- Place of birth: Bordeaux, France
- Height: 1.80 m (5 ft 11 in)
- Position: Midfielder

Youth career
- 2001–2007: CMO Bassens
- 2007–2013: Bordeaux

Senior career*
Years	Team	Apps	(Gls)
2012–2017	Bordeaux B	56	(7)
2013–2017	Bordeaux	16	(0)
2015–2016	→ Red Star (loan)	4	(0)
2019–2023	Sochaux B	9	(1)
2019–2023	Sochaux	70	(1)
2024–2025	Bordeaux	7	(0)

International career
2013	France U19	3	(0)
2014–2015	France U20	9	(3)
- * Club domestic league appearances and goals as of 17 May 2025

Younès Kaabouni (Arabic: يونس كعبوني; born 23 May 1995) is a French professional footballer who plays as a midfielder.

== Career ==
Kaabouni made his Ligue 1 debut with Girondins de Bordeaux on 6 October 2013 in 4–1 home win against Sochaux entering the field after 88 minutes for Abdou Traoré. On 31 August 2017, Kaabouni and Bordeaux agreed the termination of his contract.

In January 2019, he signed with Sochaux to play with the reserve team initially and with the goal to join the first team later. His contract with Sochaux was terminated by mutual consent on 17 March 2023.

In September 2024, Kaabouni returned to Championnat National 2 club Bordeaux following their recent relegations.

== Personal life ==
Born in France, Kaabouni is of Moroccan descent.

== Career statistics ==
=== Club ===
As of 4 December 2023

Appearances and goals by club, season and competition
Club	Season	League			National cup		League cup		Europe		Other		Total	
Club	Season	Division	Apps	Goals	Apps	Goals	Apps	Goals	Apps	Goals	Apps	Goals	Apps	Goals
Bordeaux	2013–14	Ligue 1	4	0	1	0	0	0	0	0	—		5	0
Bordeaux	2014–15	Ligue 1	12	0	0	0	1	0	—		—		13	0
Bordeaux	Total		16	0	1	0	1	0	0	0	0	0	18	0
Red Star (loan)	2015–16	Ligue 2	4	0	0	0	1	0	—		—		5	0
Sochaux	2018–19	Ligue 2	2	0	0	0	0	0	—		—		2	0
Sochaux	2019–20	Ligue 2	19	1	1	0	0	0	—		—		20	1
Sochaux	2020–21	Ligue 2	26	0	3	0	0	0	—		—		29	0
Sochaux	2021–22	Ligue 2	23	0	1	0	0	0	—		—		24	0
Sochaux	2022–23	Ligue 2	0	0	0	0	0	0	—		—		0	0
Sochaux	Total		70	1	5	0	0	0	0	0	0	0	75	1
Career total			90	1	6	0	2	0	0	0	0	0	98	1
