= Jérôme Prior =

French footballer (born 1995)

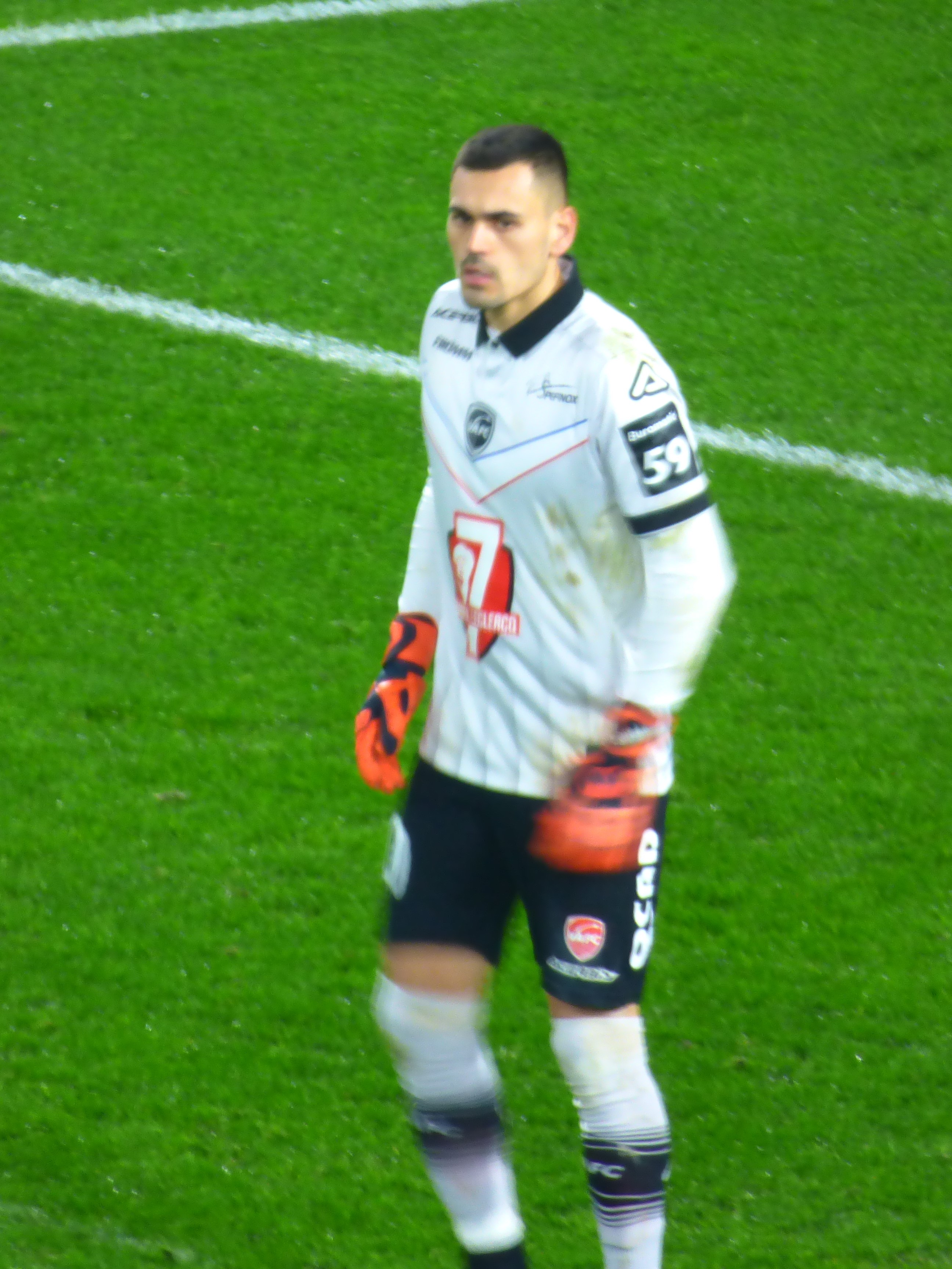
- Prior in 2019

Personal information
- Full name: Jérôme Prior
- Date of birth: 8 August 1995 (age 31)
- Place of birth: Toulon, France
- Height: 1.87 m (6 ft 2 in)
- Position: Goalkeeper

Team information
- Current team: Livingston
- Number: 28

Youth career
- –2008: US Cuers Pierrefeu
- 2008–2009: Toulon
- 2009–2010: Hyères
- 2010–2012: Cannes
- 2012–2015: Bordeaux

Senior career*
Years	Team	Apps	(Gls)
2012–2018	Bordeaux II	36	(0)
2015–2019	Bordeaux	29	(0)
2019–2021	Valenciennes	59	(0)
2021–2022	Cartagena	2	(0)
2022–2023	PAS Giannina	3	(0)
2023	Pau	11	(0)
2024–	Livingston	71	(0)
- * Club domestic league appearances and goals as of 20 May 2026

Jérôme Prior (born 8 August 1995) is a French professional footballer who plays as a goalkeeper for Scottish Championship club Livingston.

== Career ==
=== Girondins de Bordeaux ===
In 2012, Prior made his debut for Girondins de Bordeaux II. He made his Ligue 1 debut at 15 August 2015 in a 1–1 draw against AS Saint-Étienne.

=== Miedź Legnica ===
In February 2019, he signed for Miedź Legnica of the Polish Ekstraklasa on loan until the end of the 2018–19 season.

=== Valenciennes ===
In July 2019, Prior joined Ligue 2 club Valenciennes. On 14 August 2021, he moved abroad and signed a one-year deal with Spanish Segunda División side Cartagena.

=== PAS Giannina ===
On 29 June 2022, Prior signed a three-year contract with PAS Giannina.

=== Livingston ===
In May 2024, Prior signed a pre-contract with Scottish side Livingston on an initial one-year-deal, with an automatic one-year extension triggered by promotion.

== Career statistics ==
As of match played 17 May 2026

Appearances and goals by club, season and competition
Club	Season	League			Cup		League Cup		Europe		Other		Total	
Club	Season	Division	Apps	Goals	Apps	Goals	Apps	Goals	Apps	Goals	Apps	Goals	Apps	Goals
Bordeaux II	2012–13	CFA	5	0	—		—		—		—		5	0
Bordeaux II	2013–14	CFA	12	0	—		—		—		—		12	0
Bordeaux II	2014–15	CFA	9	0	—		—		—		—		9	0
Bordeaux II	2015–16	CFA	2	0	—		—		—		—		2	0
Bordeaux II	2016–17	CFA 2	4	0	—		—		—		—		4	0
Bordeaux II	2017–18	Championnat National 3	1	0	—		—		—		—		1	0
Bordeaux II	2018–19	Championnat National 2	3	0	—		—		—		—		3	0
Bordeaux II	Total		36	0	—		—		—		—		36	0
Bordeaux	2013–14	Ligue 1	0	0	—		—		—		—		0	0
Bordeaux	2014–15	Ligue 1	0	0	0	0	0	0	—		—		0	0
Bordeaux	2015–16	Ligue 1	13	0	3	0	1	0	3	0	—		20	0
Bordeaux	2016–17	Ligue 1	14	0	1	0	4	0	—		—		19	0
Bordeaux	2017–18	Ligue 1	2	0	0	0	1	0	0	0	—		3	0
Bordeaux	2018–19	Ligue 1	0	0	0	0	0	0	—		—		0	0
Bordeaux	Total		29	0	4	0	6	0	3	0	—		42	0
Valenciennes	2019–20	Ligue 2	27	0	3	0	0	0	—		—		30	0
Valenciennes	2020–21	Ligue 2	32	0	0	0	—		—		—		32	0
Valenciennes	Total		59	0	3	0	0	0	—		—		62	0
Cartagena	2021–22	Segunda División	2	0	3	0	—		—		—		5	0
PAS Giannina	2022–23	Super League Greece	3	0	1	0	—		—		—		4	0
Pau	2022–23	Ligue 2	11	0	—		—		—		—		11	0
Livingston	2024–25	Scottish Championship	33	0	4	0	0	0	—		7	0	44	0
Livingston	2025–26	Scottish Premiership	38	0	1	0	5	0	—		—		44	0
Livingston	Total		71	0	5	0	5	0	—		7	0	88	0
Career total			211	0	16	0	11	0	3	0	7	0	247	0

== Honours ==
Livingston

- Scottish Challenge Cup: 2024–25
- Scottish Premiership play-offs: 2025
