= Cédric Yambéré =

Central African footballer (born 1990)

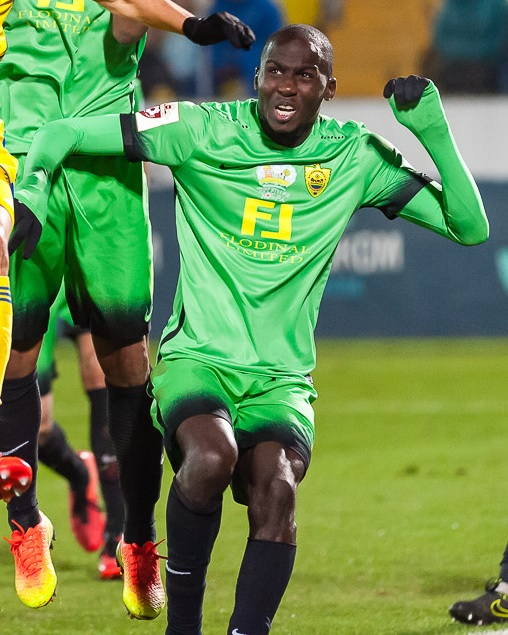
- Yambéré with Anzhi Makhachkala in 2016

Personal information
- Date of birth: 6 November 1990 (age 36)
- Place of birth: Bordeaux, France
- Height: 1.91 m (6 ft 3 in)
- Positions: Centre-back; defensive midfielder

Youth career
- –2013: US Lormont
- 2013–2014: Bordeaux

Senior career*
Years	Team	Apps	(Gls)
2012	US Lormont	7	(1)
2013–2015	Bordeaux B	49	(4)
2014–2017	Bordeaux	43	(4)
2016	→ Anzhi Makhachkala (loan)	12	(0)
2017	→ APOEL (loan)	7	(1)
2017–2019	Dijon	65	(3)
2019–2020	Ettifaq	26	(1)
2021	RWDM	5	(0)
2021–2022	Orléans	13	(0)
2022–2023	Chania	21	(1)
2023	Doxa Katokopias	3	(0)
2024	KÍ Klaksvik	12	(4)
2024–2025	Bordeaux	23	(2)

International career^{‡}
2017–	Central African Republic	13	(0)
- * Club domestic league appearances and goals as of 30 May 2024 ‡ National team caps and goals as of 7 June 2021

Cédric Yambéré (born 6 November 1990) is a professional footballer who plays as a centre-back. Born in France, he plays for the Central African Republic national team.

== Club career ==
=== Bordeaux ===
Yambéré joined Girondins de Bordeaux in January 2013 from US Lormont. He made his Ligue 1 debut at 25 October 2014 against Paris Saint-Germain playing the full game in a 3–0 away defeat.

==== Anzhi Makhachkala (loan) ====
On 13 July 2016, he joined the Russian club Anzhi Makhachkala for the 2016–17 season on loan.

==== APOEL (loan) ====
On 24 January 2017, he moved on loan to Cypriot First Division champions APOEL until the end of the 2016–17 season. He made his official debut on 11 February 2017, playing the full 90 minutes in APOEL's 1–0 away victory against Karmiotissa in the league. He scored his first official goal on 23 April 2017, netting a late equalizer in APOEL's 1–1 home draw against Anorthosis.

=== Dijon ===
On 30 June 2017, Yambéré left Bordeaux definitively, and signed a two-year deal with fellow Ligue 1 side Dijon for a transfer fee of around €500,000.

=== Ettifaq ===
On 29 June 2019, Yambéré signed a three-year deal with Saudi Professional League club Ettifaq.

=== Orléans ===
On 1 October 2021, he signed with Orléans in the French third-tier Championnat National.

=== KÍ Klaksvik ===
On 27 February 2024, Faroese side KÍ Klaksvik announced the signing of Yambéré. On 4 May 2024, he scored his first goal for the club in a 2–0 home win against 07 Vestur.

== International career ==
Yambéré received his first call-up to the Central African Republic national team on 13 August 2016. He made his debut on 27 March 2017, in a 2–1 friendly defeat against Gambia at Stade municipal de Kénitra.

== Career statistics ==
As of 20 May 2017

Club	Season	League			Cup		League Cup		Continental		Other		Total	
Club	Season	Division	Apps	Goals	Apps	Goals	Apps	Goals	Apps	Goals	Apps	Goals	Apps	Goals
Bordeaux	2014–15	Ligue 1	16	1	2	0	2	0	—		—		20	1
Bordeaux	2015–16	Ligue 1	27	3	1	0	3	0	7 (Note: Appearances in UEFA Europa League)	0	—		38	3
Bordeaux	Total		43	4	3	0	5	0	7	0	—		58	4
Anzhi Makhachkala (Loan)	2016–17	Russian Premier League	12	0	1	0	—		—		—		13	0
APOEL (Loan)	2016–17	Cypriot First Division	7	1	3	0	—		2	0	—		12	1
Dijon	2017–18	Ligue 1	32	3	—		1	0	—		—		33	3
Dijon	2018–19	Ligue 1	27	0	1	0	2	0	—		—		30	0
Dijon	Total		59	3	1	0	3	0	7	0	—		63	3
Career total			121	8	8	0	8	0	9	0	—		146	8

=== International ===
As of 7 June 2021

National team	Year	Apps	Goals
Central African Republic
Central African Republic	2017	1	0
Central African Republic	2018	3	0
Central African Republic	2019	4	0
Central African Republic	2020	1	0
Central African Republic	2021	4	0
Total		13	0

== Honours ==
APOEL

- Cypriot First Division: 2016–17
