= Jaroslav Plašil =

Czech footballer (born 1982)

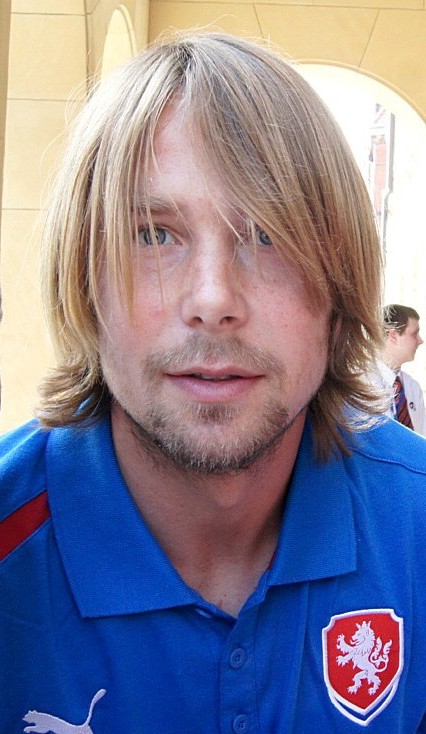
- Plašil with Czech Republic at the UEFA Euro 2012

Personal information
- Full name: Jaroslav Plašil
- Date of birth: 5 January 1982 (age 44)
- Place of birth: Opočno, Czechoslovakia
- Height: 1.83 m (6 ft 0 in)
- Position: Midfielder

Youth career
- 1987–1992: Sokol Černíkovice
- 1992–1993: Spartak Rychnov nad Kněžnou
- 1993–1998: Hradec Králové

Senior career*
Years	Team	Apps	(Gls)
1998–2000	Hradec Králové	4	(0)
2000–2007	Monaco	121	(5)
2002–2003	→ Créteil (loan)	14	(0)
2007–2009	Osasuna	66	(8)
2009–2019	Bordeaux	290	(15)
2013–2014	→ Catania (loan)	28	(1)
Total		523	(29)

International career
2002–2003	Czech Republic U21	16	(1)
2004–2016	Czech Republic	103	(7)
Medal record
Men's football
Representing Czech Republic
UEFA European Championship
Bronze medal – third place	2004 Portugal
- * Club domestic league appearances and goals

Jaroslav Plašil (Czech pronunciation: [ˈjaroslaf ˈplaʃɪl]; born 5 January 1982) is a Czech former professional footballer who played as a midfielder.

He spent most of his career in France with Monaco and Bordeaux, making 411 Ligue 1 appearances. He played 367 total times for the latter, and captained them to victory in the 2012–13 Coupe de France. He also played two seasons with Osasuna in Spain and one on loan to Catania in Italy.

Plašil earned 103 caps for the Czech Republic from 2004 to 2016. He represented them at four UEFA European Championships and the 2006 FIFA World Cup.

== Club career ==
=== Early career ===
Plašil, aged 18, was signed by Monaco in 2000, but in his first two-year spell, he only started 8 matches. He was subsequently loaned to Ligue 2 club Créteil. After a decent performance, Plašil returned to Monaco at the start of the 2003 season and for the next four years he was a regular in the starting team and even enjoyed his finest moment in the 2003–04 season when the principality side reached the final of the UEFA Champions League. In that season, Plašil contributed a goal to Monaco's record-breaking 8–3 defeat of Deportivo La Coruña.

=== Osasuna ===
On 25 August 2007, Plašil signed a four-year deal at La Liga team CA Osasuna for a fee of €2.25 million, to replace the injured Javad Nekounam.

He made his debut on 16 September, replacing Javier García Portillo for the final 19 minutes of a goalless home draw against FC Barcelona. His first goal for the team from Pamplona came on 2 December, a left-foot volley to open a 2–1 victory at Deportivo de La Coruña. Three days later he got his first goal in the Reyno de Navarra Stadium, to begin a 1–1 draw against Sevilla FC. He finished the season with four goals from 35 games, the last being the only one in a win over rivals Real Zaragoza on 10 February 2008, in first-half added time.

On 5 October 2008, Plašil was sent off in the first half of a 1–0 home loss to Racing de Santander for handball from Ezequiel Garay's shot, although he missed the penalty kick. He again totalled four goals in 32 games, concluding on 31 May 2009 with an equaliser in a 2–1 home win over Real Madrid.

=== Bordeaux ===
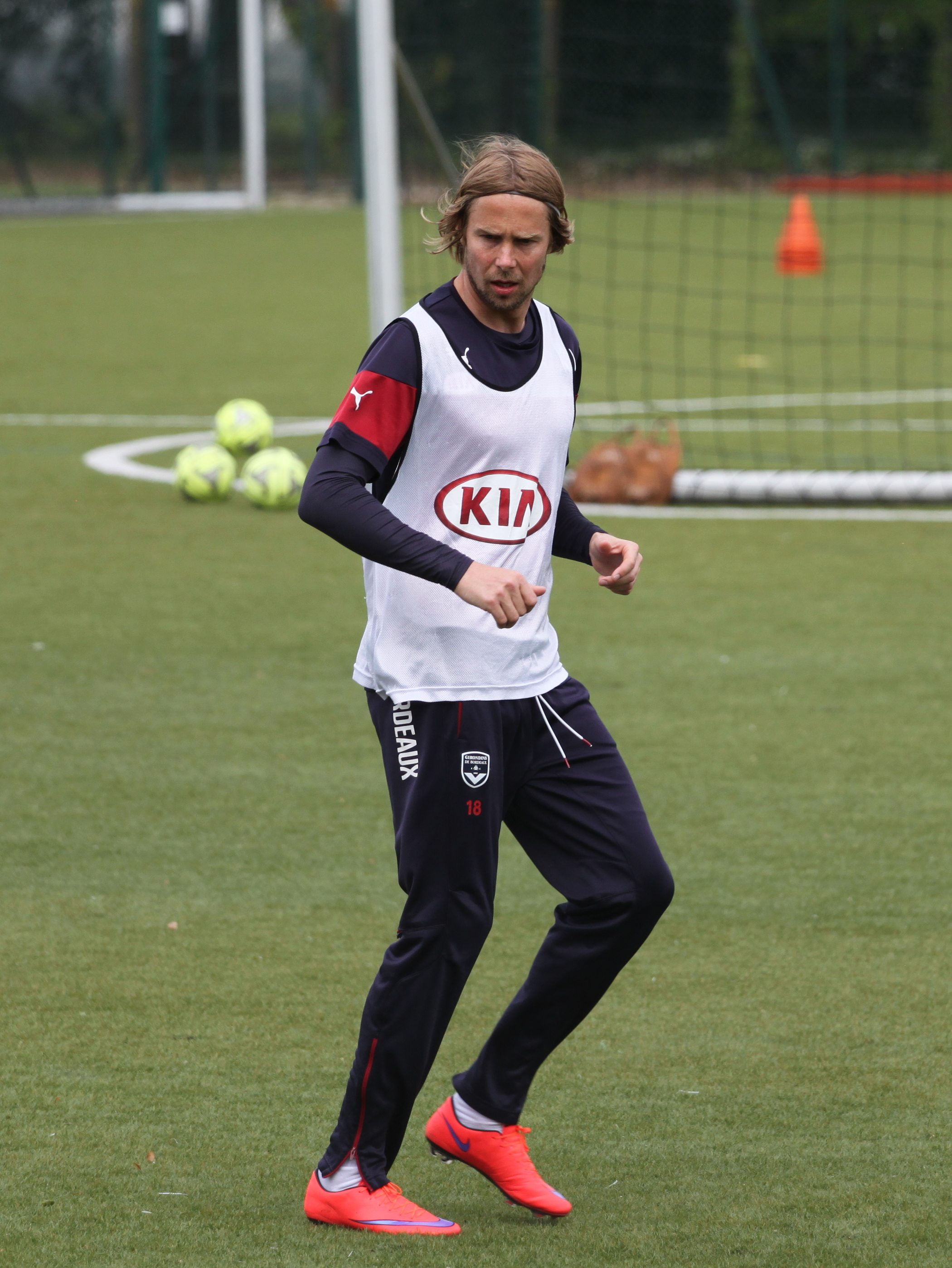
Plašil training with Bordeaux in April 2015

On 9 June 2009, French champions Bordeaux signed Plašil on a four-year deal for an estimated €3 million. He made his debut for Bordeaux when they won the 2009 Trophée des Champions.

On 31 May 2013, Plašil captained Bordeaux in its 3–2 defeat of Evian in the 2013 Coupe de France Final at the Stade de France.

On 2 September 2013, Plašil signed on loan for Serie A club Catania. He played 29 times for the Sicilians, scoring on 29 September to open a 2–0 win over Chievo, their first win of the season.

On 7 June 2017, Plašil extended his contract for one more year. Six months later, he was one of three Girondins sent off in a 2–1 loss at fourth-tier US Granville in the last 64 of the cup; he received a five-match ban for dissent.

In July 2019, Plašil retired at the age of 37. He immediately joined the coaching staff at Bordeaux's reserve team in the Championnat National 3.

== International career ==
Plašil made his debut for the Czech Republic senior squad on 31 March 2004, replacing Martin Jiránek for the final 21 minutes of a 2–1 friendly loss to the Republic of Ireland at Lansdowne Road.

In his next game on 2 June, he scored his first goal in a 3–1 friendly win over Bulgaria. He was selected for UEFA Euro 2004 in Portugal where his team reached the semi-finals; his lone appearance was a 2–1 win that eliminated neighbours Germany on 23 June at the Estádio José Alvalade. He started in what BBC Sport called an "under-strength" Czech team, making way for Karel Poborský with 20 minutes remaining.

Plašil started all three of the Czechs' group games at the 2006 FIFA World Cup in Germany, their first since partition, where they were eliminated at the expense of eventual champions Italy. Plašil played 13 times in qualification for UEFA Euro 2008, scoring to cap a 3–0 win over Germany in the Allianz Arena on 17 October 2007 that qualified his team to the finals in Austria and Switzerland; it was Joachim Löw's first defeat as national manager. In the final tournament, Plašil started each game in Group A and scored to put the Czechs 2–0 up against Turkey in the last game, which they eventually lost 3–2 to be eliminated.

Plašil played every minute of the Czech Republic's campaign at UEFA Euro 2012 in Poland and Ukraine, where they were eliminated 1–0 by Portugal in the quarter-finals. He was called up for his fourth time at the continental championship when he was chosen for UEFA Euro 2016 in France. In a pre-tournament friendly match on 5 June, he earned his 100th cap in a 2–1 home friendly loss to South Korea. He started all three group matches at the tournament as the Czech national team exited with two losses and a draw.

== Career statistics ==
=== Club ===
Appearances and goals by club, season and competition
Club	Season	League			Cup (Note: Includes Coupe de France, Coupe de la Ligue, Trophée des Champions, Copa del Rey.)		Europe (Note: includes Europa League, UEFA Supercup, UEFA Champions League.)		Total	
Club	Season	Division	Apps	Goals	Apps	Goals	Apps	Goals	Apps	Goals
Monaco	2001–02	Ligue 1 (Note: "Division 1" until 2022)	4	0	0	0	0	0	4	0
Monaco	2002–03	Ligue 1	4	0	0	0	0	0	4	0
Monaco	2003–04	Ligue 1	34	2	0	0	10	1	44	3
Monaco	2004–05	Ligue 1	24	1	0	0	5	0	29	1
Monaco	2005–06	Ligue 1	21	1	6	0	0	0	27	1
Monaco	2006–07	Ligue 1	30	1	1	0	0	0	31	1
Monaco	2007–08	Ligue 1	4	0	0	0	0	0	4	0
Monaco	Total		121	5	7	0	15	1	143	6
Créteil (loan)	2002–03	Ligue 2	14	0	0	0	—		14	0
Osasuna	2007–08	La Liga	34	4	1	0	—		35	5
Osasuna	2008–09	La Liga	32	4	0	0	—		32	4
Osasuna	Total		66	8	1	0	0	0	67	8
Bordeaux	2009–10	Ligue 1	34	2	7	2	9	1	50	5
Bordeaux	2010–11	Ligue 1	38	4	4	0	—		42	4
Bordeaux	2011–12	Ligue 1	38	3	2	0	—		40	3
Bordeaux	2012–13	Ligue 1	33	2	6	0	10	0	49	2
Bordeaux	2013–14	Ligue 1	4	0	1	0	—		5	0
Bordeaux	2014–15	Ligue 1	34	0	4	0	—		38	0
Bordeaux	2015–16	Ligue 1	27	3	6	1	4	0	37	4
Bordeaux	2016–17	Ligue 1	37	1	8	1	0	0	45	2
Bordeaux	2017–18	Ligue 1	22	0	2	0	2	0	26	0
Bordeaux	2018–19	Ligue 1	23	0	3	0	9	0	35	0
Bordeaux	Total		290	15	43	4	34	1	367	20
Catania (loan)	2013–14	Serie A	28	1	—		—		28	1
Career total			519	29	51	4	49	2	619	35

=== International ===
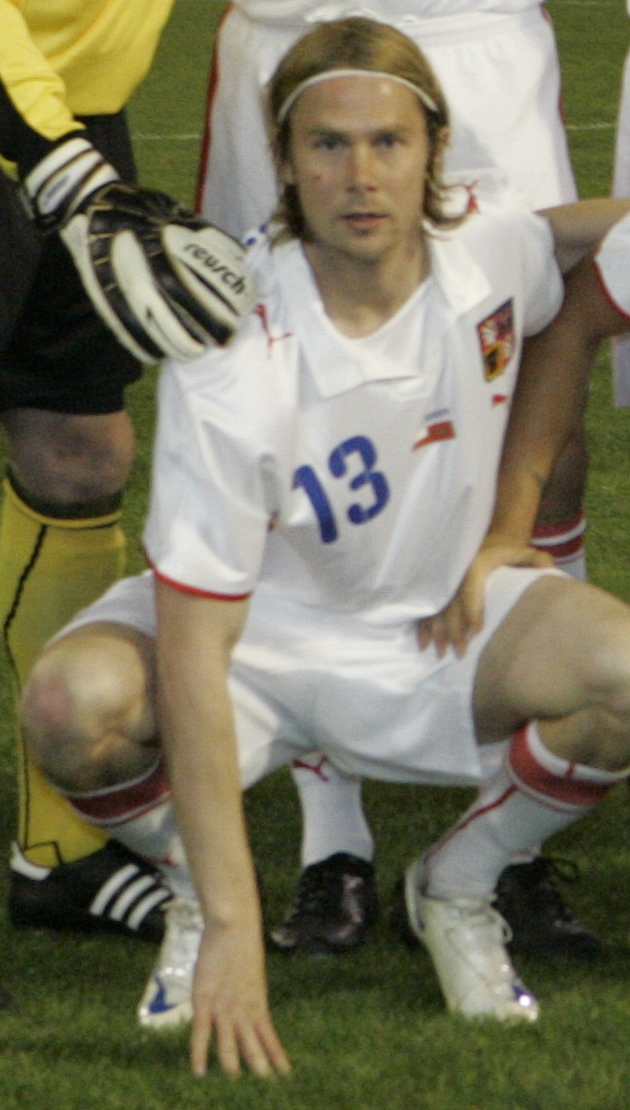
Plašil lining up for a friendly against Morocco in 2009

Appearances and goals by national team and year
National team	Year	Apps	Goals
Czech Republic	2004	4	1
Czech Republic	2005	6	0
Czech Republic	2006	13	0
Czech Republic	2007	10	1
Czech Republic	2008	11	1
Czech Republic	2009	8	1
Czech Republic	2010	8	0
Czech Republic	2011	9	2
Czech Republic	2012	11	0
Czech Republic	2013	9	0
Czech Republic	2014	2	0
Czech Republic	2015	6	0
Czech Republic	2016	6	1
Total		103	7

Scores and results list Czech Republic goal tally first, score column indicates score after each Plašil goal.

List of international goals scored by Jaroslav Plašil
No.	Date	Venue	Cap	Opponent	Score	Result	Competition
1	1 June 2004	Generali Arena, Prague, Czech Republic	2	Bulgaria	2–0	3–1	Friendly
2	17 October 2007	Allianz Arena, Munich, Germany	31	Germany	3–0	3–0	UEFA Euro 2008 qualifying
3	15 June 2008	Stade de Genève, Geneva, Switzerland	40	Turkey	2–0	2–3	UEFA Euro 2008
4	10 October 2009	Generali Arena, Prague, Czech Republic	51	Poland	2–0	2–0	2010 FIFA World Cup qualification
5	25 March 2011	Estadio Nuevo Los Cármenes, Granada, Spain	62	Spain	1–0	1–2	UEFA Euro 2012 qualifying
6	3 September 2011	Hampden Park, Glasgow, Scotland	65	Scotland	1–1	2–2	UEFA Euro 2012 qualifying
7	27 May 2016	Kufstein Arena, Kufstein, Austria	98	Malta	1–0	6–0	Friendly

== Honours ==
Monaco

- UEFA Champions League runner-up: 2003–04

Bordeaux

- Trophée des Champions: 2009
- Coupe de France: 2012–13

== See also ==
- List of footballers with 100 or more caps
