= Thomas Touré =

Ivorian footballer (born 1993)

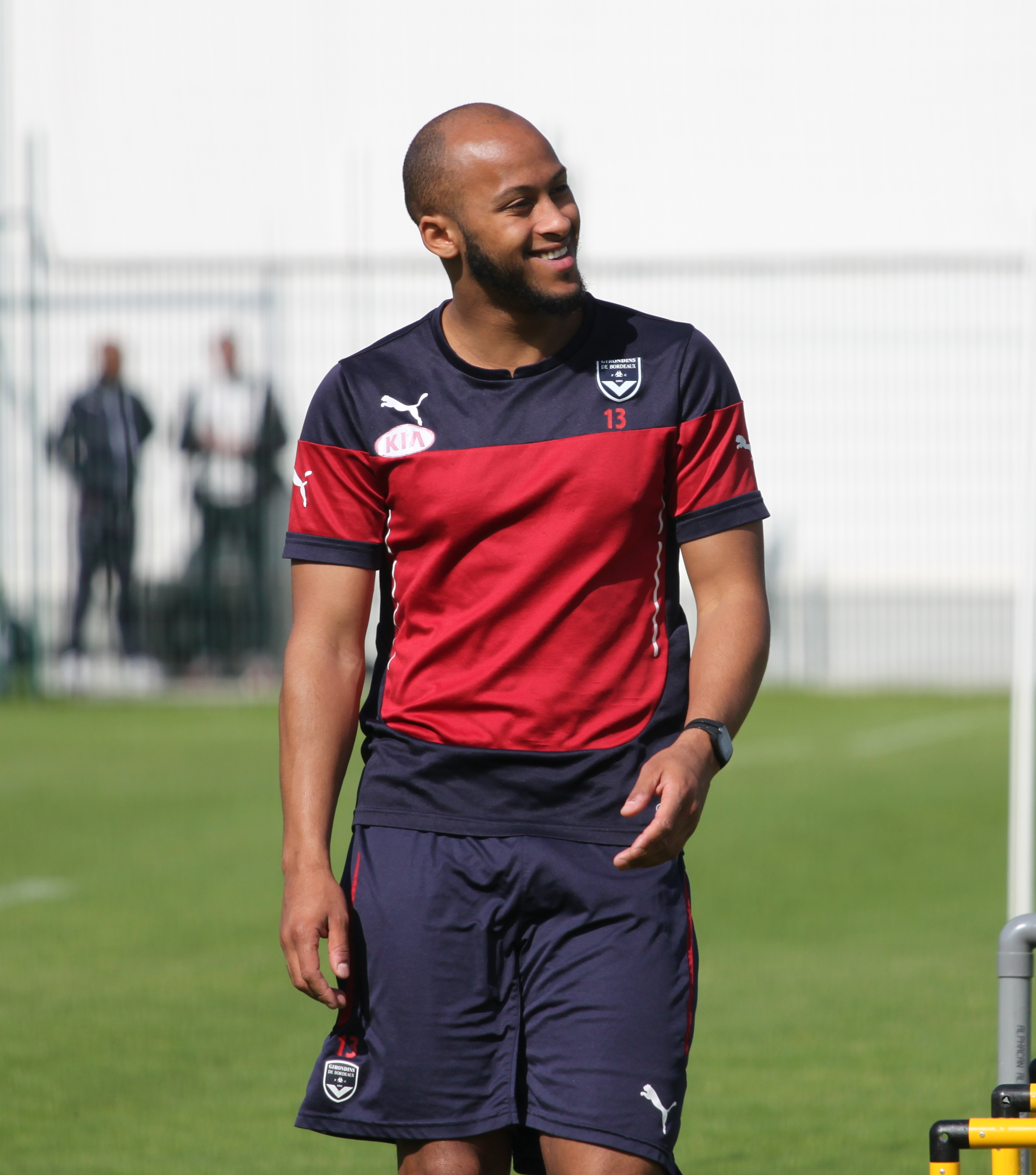
- Touré with Bordeaux

Personal information
- Date of birth: 27 December 1993 (age 32)
- Place of birth: Grasse, France
- Height: 1.75 m (5 ft 9 in)
- Position: Winger

Team information
- Current team: RC Grasse
- Number: 7

Youth career
- 1999–2003: US Cannes Boca
- 2003–2010: Cannes
- 2010–2011: Bordeaux

Senior career*
Years	Team	Apps	(Gls)
2011–2015	Bordeaux B	82	(20)
2014–2017	Bordeaux	53	(4)
2017–2021	Angers II	24	(8)
2017–2021	Angers	7	(0)
2019	→ Paris FC (loan)	10	(2)
2019–2020	→ Sochaux (loan)	21	(2)
2021–2022	Virton	10	(0)
2024–	RC Grasse	21	(2)

International career
2011	France U18	2	(0)
2016	Ivory Coast	1	(0)
- * Club domestic league appearances and goals as of 4 February 2026

Thomas Touré (born 27 December 1993) is a professional footballer who plays as a winger for RC Grasse. Born in France, he made one international appearance for the Ivory Coast national team in 2016.

== Club career ==
Touré made his Ligue 1 debut on 4 May 2014 in a 0–1 away win against Valenciennes replacing Diego Rolán after 88 minutes in Stade du Hainaut.

In January 2019, he was loaned to Paris FC from Angers until the end of the season.

On 2 September 2021, he signed a two-year contract with Virton in Belgium. However, on 29 August 2022 it was reported, that Touré officially had left the club. In January 2023, it emerged that Touré was training with Maltese club Floriana FC. However, no contract was ever signed.

== International career ==
Touré was born in Grasse, France to an Ivorian father and a French mother. He made two appearances for France U18 in friendlies against the Swiss U18s.

He switched to the Ivory Coast national team and made his debut in a 0–0 friendly tie with Hungary on 20 May 2016.

== Career statistics ==
As of match played 19 September 2020

Appearances and goals by club, season and competition
Club	Season	League			National cup		League cup		Continental		Total	
Club	Season	Division	Apps	Goals	Apps	Goals	Apps	Goals	Apps	Goals	Apps	Goals
Bordeaux	2013–14	Ligue 1	2	0	—		—		—		2	0
Bordeaux	2014–15	Ligue 1	23	2	2	1	2	0	—		27	3
Bordeaux	2015–16	Ligue 1	22	2	3	0	1	0	4	1	30	3
Bordeaux	2016–17	Ligue 1	6	0	—		—		—		6	0
Bordeaux	Total		53	4	5	1	3	0	4	1	65	6
Angers	2017–18	Ligue 1	7	0	1	0	1	0	—		9	0
Angers II	2017–18	National 3	14	5	0	0	—		—		14	5
Angers II	2018–19	National 3	7	3	0	0	—		—		7	3
Angers II	2020–21	National 2	3	0	0	0	—		—		3	0
Angers II	Total		24	8	0	0	0	0	0	0	24	8
Paris FC (loan)	2018–19	Ligue 2	10	2	0	0	0	0	—		10	2
Sochaux (loan)	2019–20	Ligue 2	21	2	0	0	1	0	—		22	2
Career total			115	16	6	1	5	0	4	1	130	18
