= Abdou Traoré (footballer, born 1988) =

Malian footballer

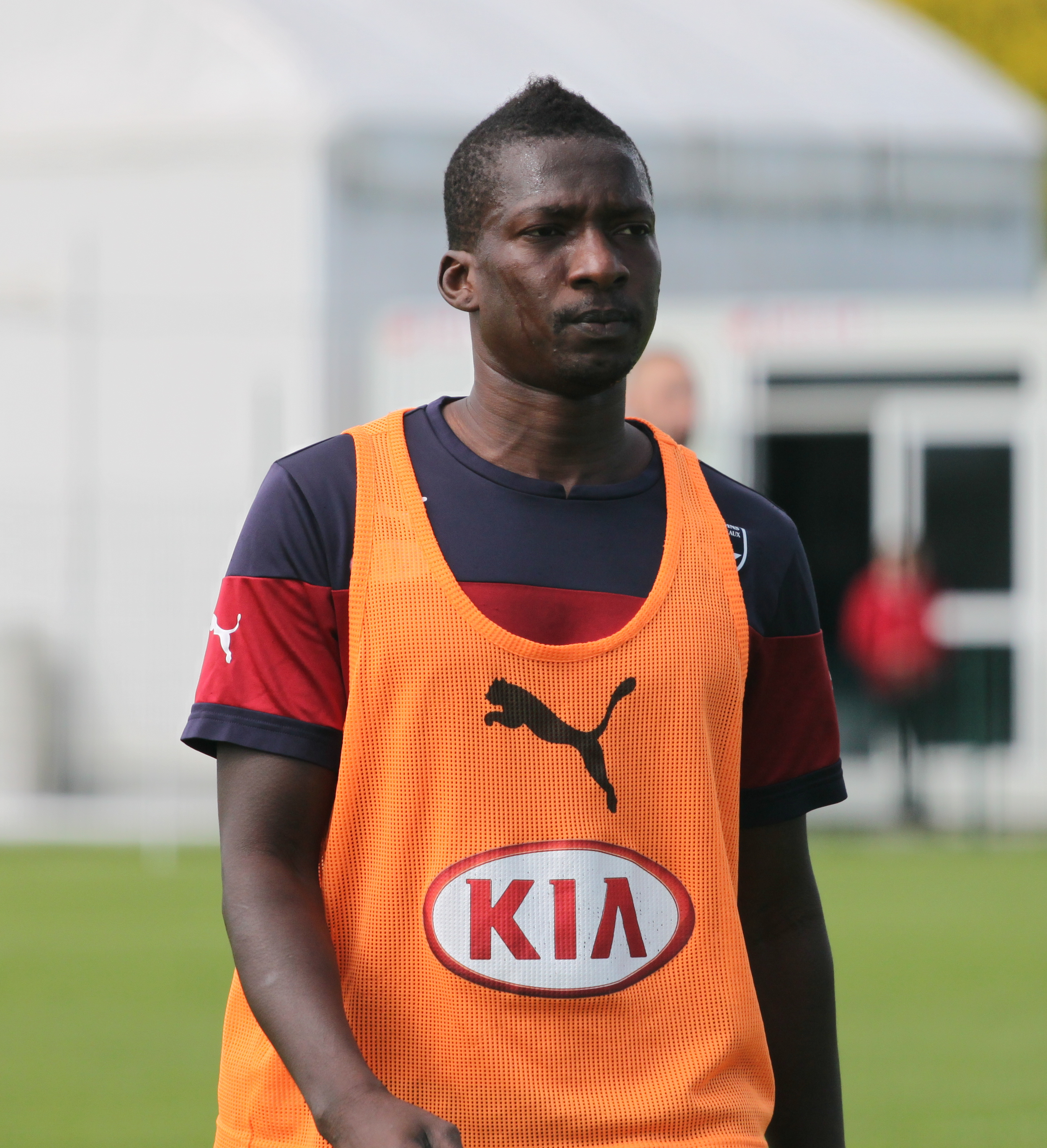
- Traoré training with Bordeaux in 2015

Personal information
- Full name: Abdoulaye Traoré
- Date of birth: 17 January 1988 (age 38)
- Place of birth: Bamako, Mali
- Height: 1.79 m (5 ft 10 in)
- Position: Midfielder

Youth career
- 2003–2005: CO Bamako
- 2006–2008: Bordeaux

Senior career*
Years	Team	Apps	(Gls)
2005–2006	CO Bamako	47	(14)
2008–2017	Bordeaux	91	(2)
2010–2011	→ Nice (loan)	23	(1)
2012–2017	Bordeaux B	26	(1)
2018	Al-Nahda	13	(0)

International career^{‡}
2009–	Mali	38	(3)
- * Club domestic league appearances and goals as of 18:46, 20 December 2020 (UTC) ‡ National team caps and goals as of 18:46, 20 December 2020 (UTC)

Abdoulaye Traoré (born 17 January 1988) is a Malian professional footballer who most recently played as a midfielder for Al-Nahda in 2018 and for the Mali national team.

== Club career ==
Born in Bamako, Traoré began his career with Cercle Olympique de Bamako, where he played his first professional season in the Malien Premiere Division. After one year in the Malien Premiere Division he was in signed by FC Girondins de Bordeaux in July 2006. He played 43 games over two years for Bordeaux's reserve team, scoring three goals, before being promoted to the Ligue 1 team in July 2008.

In May 2017, it was announced Traoré would leave Bordeaux at the end of the 2016–17 season having spent 11 years at the club. In his time at the Girondins he made 91 Ligue 1 appearances, only 6 of which came in his last season there.

== International career ==
Traoré is former member of Mali youth teams and made his first appearance for the Mali national team on 11 February 2009 against Angola.

=== International goals ===
Scores and results list Mali's goal tally first, score column indicates score after each Traoré goal.

List of international goals scored by Abdou Traoré
No.	Date	Venue	Opponent	Score	Result	Competition
1	9 October 2010	Stade Modibo Kéïta, Bamako, Mali	Liberia	1–0	2–1	2012 Africa Cup of Nations qualification
2	17 November 2010	Stade Roger Rochard, Évreux, France	DR Congo	2–1	3–1	Friendly
3	24 March 2013	Stade Amahoro, Kigali, Rwanda	Rwanda	2–1	2–1	2014 FIFA World Cup qualification

== Honours ==
Bordeaux

- Ligue 1: 2008–09
- Coupe de la Ligue: 2008–09
- Coupe de France: 2012–13

Mali

- Africa Cup of Nations bronze: 2012
