= Diego Rolán =

Uruguayan footballer (born 1993)

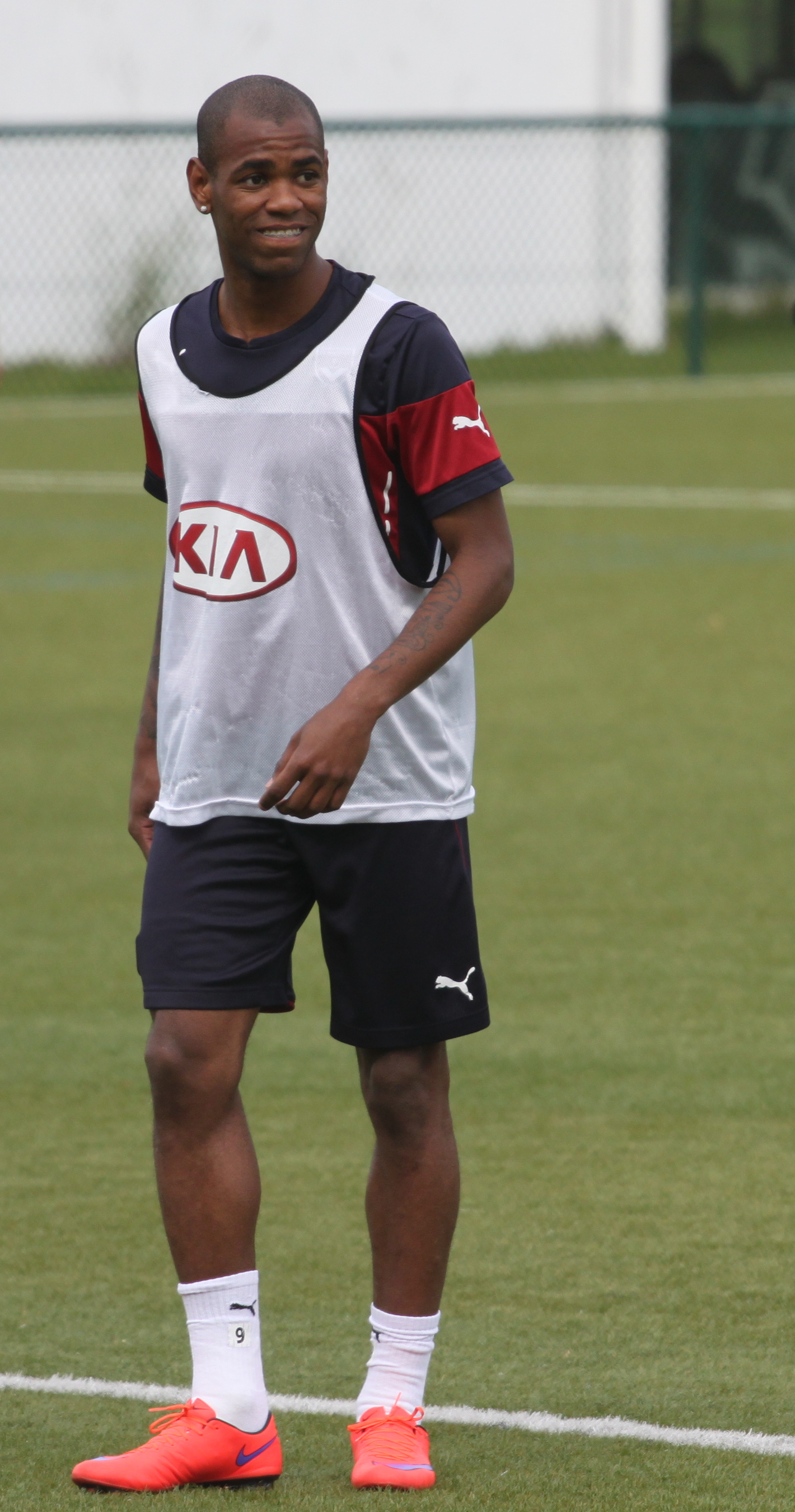
- Rolán training with Bordeaux in 2015

Personal information
- Full name: Diego Alejandro Rolán Silva
- Date of birth: 24 March 1993 (age 33)
- Place of birth: Montevideo, Uruguay
- Height: 1.78 m (5 ft 10 in)
- Position: Striker

Team information
- Current team: Cerrito
- Number: 19

Youth career
- 1999–2011: Defensor Sporting

Senior career*
Years	Team	Apps	(Gls)
2011–2013	Defensor Sporting	38	(10)
2013–2018	Bordeaux	121	(33)
2017–2018	→ Málaga (loan)	26	(5)
2018–2021	Deportivo La Coruña	4	(2)
2018–2019	→ Leganés (loan)	6	(0)
2019	→ Alavés (loan)	9	(0)
2019–2020	→ Juárez (loan)	18	(8)
2021	→ Pyramids (loan)	8	(3)
2021–2022	Juárez	20	(4)
2023	Peñarol	5	(0)
2026–	Cerrito	5	(0)

International career
2011–2012	Uruguay U20	17	(4)
2014–2017	Uruguay	25	(4)
- * Club domestic league appearances and goals as of 25 June 2023

Diego Alejandro Rolán Silva (born 24 March 1993) is a Uruguayan professional footballer who plays as a striker for Cerrito.

== Club career ==
=== Defensor Sporting ===
Rolan came up from the youth development squads of Defensor Sporting, being graduated to the first team in 2011. On 28 August 2011, he made his official debut in a 1–1 draw against Cerrito. On 13 November 2011, he scored his first official goal against Cerro Largo FC. His second goal came on 26 February 2012, in the 84th minute to take the lead for Defensor against Nacional in Montevideo which ended 2–2. On 23 September, he scored a hat-trick during a 4–1 win over Progreso. On 17 November, he scored another hat-trick, this time in a 4–0 win over Bella Vista.

=== Bordeaux ===
After his breakthrough at the 2013 South American Youth Championship, several big teams in Europe were reportedly interested in signing Rolan. On 11 February 2013, he signed a contract with Ligue 1 side FC Girondins de Bordeaux.

==== Málaga (loan) ====
On 29 August 2017, Rolan was loaned to La Liga side Málaga CF for one year.

=== Deportivo La Coruña ===
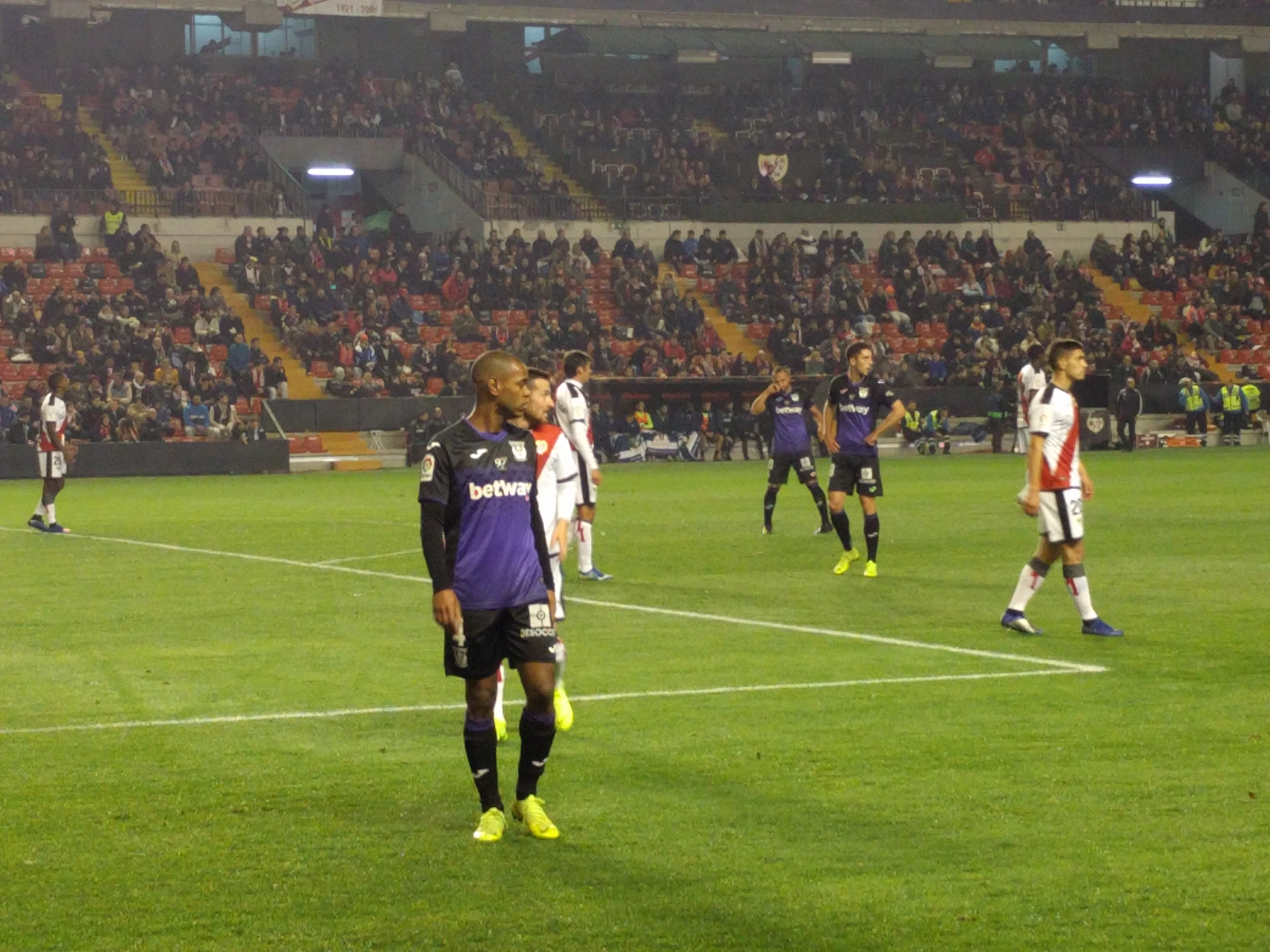
Rolán with Leganés in 2018.

On 17 July 2018, Bordeaux announced the transfer to Deportivo de La Coruña. The transfer fee was estimated at €6 million. Nine days later, he was loaned to CD Leganés in the first division for one year, with a buyout clause.

On 31 January 2019, Rolán left Leganés and moved to fellow league team Deportivo Alavés, on loan for the remainder of the season.

On 31 January 2021, Rolán moved to Egyptian club Pyramids FC on loan until the end of the season.

=== Return to Juárez ===
On 17 August 2021, Rolán signed with Liga MX side Juárez.

== International career ==
Rolan represented the Uruguay national under-20 football team at the 2011 FIFA U-20 World Cup in Colombia. In January 2013, he appeared at the 2013 South American Youth Championship in Argentina, scoring four goals to help Uruguay to the third place and qualification for the 2013 FIFA U-20 World Cup.

In September 2014, Rolan made his debut for the Uruguay national football team in a friendly win against Japan in Sapporo. He assisted Edinson Cavani's opening goal in the eventual 2–0 defeat of the Asian champions. His first senior international goal came in a 2–1 away victory over Chile on 18 November 2014.

In May 2015, Rolan was included in Uruguay's squad for the 2015 Copa América by coach Óscar Tabárez. He was assigned the number 9 shirt, usually worn by the suspended Luis Suárez. On 6 June, he scored the opening goal during a 5–1 pre-tournament friendly win over Guatemala in Montevideo.

== Career statistics ==
=== Club ===
As of 23 February 2019

Club	Season	League			Cup		International		Total	
Club	Season	Division	Apps	Goals	Apps	Goals	Apps	Goals	Apps	Goals
Defensor Sporting	2011–12	Uruguayan Primera División	23	2	0	0	3 (Note: Appearance(s) in Copa Libertadores)	0	26	2
Defensor Sporting	2012–13	Uruguayan Primera División	15	8	0	0	0	0	15	8
Defensor Sporting	Total		38	10	0	0	3	0	41	10
Girondins de Bordeaux	2012–13	Ligue 1	7	0	1	0	2 (Note: Appearance(s) in UEFA Europa League)	0	10	0
Girondins de Bordeaux	2013–14	Ligue 1	18	2	2	0	6	0	26	2
Girondins de Bordeaux	2014–15	Ligue 1	36	15	2	1	0	0	38	16
Girondins de Bordeaux	2015–16	Ligue 1	31	7	5	2	6	2	42	11
Girondins de Bordeaux	2016–17	Ligue 1	29	9	4	1	0	0	33	10
Girondins de Bordeaux	Total		121	33	14	4	14	2	149	39
Málaga (loan)	2017–18	La Liga	26	5	1	0	0	0	27	5
Deportivo La Coruña	2020–21	Segunda División B	4	2	1	0	0	0	5	2
Leganés (loan)	2018–19	La Liga	6	0	2	0	0	0	8	0
Alavés (loan)	2018–19	La Liga	9	0	0	0	0	0	9	0
Juárez (loan)	2019–20	Liga MX	18	8	3	1	0	0	21	9
Pyramids (loan)	2020–21	Egyptian Premier League	5	2	0	0	2 (Note: Appearance(s) in CAF Confederation Cup)	1	7	3
Career total			227	60	21	5	19	3	267	68

=== International ===
As of 7 June 2017

Uruguay
Year	Apps	Goals
2014	5	1
2015	12	2
2016	6	1
2017	2	0
Total	25	4

=== International goals ===
Goal	Date	Venue	Opponent	Score	Result	Competition
1	19 November 2014	Estadio Monumental David Arellano, Santiago, Chile	Chile	1–1	1–2	Friendly
2	7 June 2015	Estadio Centenario, Montevideo, Uruguay	Guatemala	1–0	5–1	Friendly
3	14 October 2015	Estadio Centenario, Montevideo, Uruguay	Colombia	2–0	3–0	World Cup qualification
4	10 November 2016	Estadio Centenario, Montevideo, Uruguay	Ecuador	2–1	2–1	World Cup qualification

== Honours ==
=== Bordeaux ===
- Coupe de France: 2013
