= 2018–19 FC Girondins de Bordeaux season =

Bordeaux
2018–19 season
- Chairman: Jean-Louis Triaud
- Manager: Gus Poyet (until 17 August); Éric Bédouet (interim) (from 17 August to 5 September); Ricardo Gomes (from 5 September to 26 February); Éric Bédouet (interim) (from 26 February to 8 March); Paulo Sousa (from 8 March)
- Stadium: Nouveau Stade de Bordeaux
- Ligue 1: 14th
- Coupe de France: Round of 64
- Coupe de la Ligue: Semi-finals
- UEFA Europa League: Group stage
- Highest home attendance: League/All: 40,841 v. PSG (2 December 2018)
- Lowest home attendance: League: 13,380 v. Dijon (20 January 2019); All: 6,311 v. Slavia Prague (29 November 2018, UEFA EL)
- Average home league attendance: 20,838
- Biggest win: 3–0 v. Nantes (7 October 2018)
- Biggest defeat: 0–3 at Saint-Étienne (14 April 2019)
Home colours	Away colours	Third colours

The 2018–19 FC Girondins de Bordeaux season was the 138th professional season of the club since its creation in 1881. Bordeaux finished their 2017–18 season in 6th place, qualifying for the UEFA Europa League.

== Players ==
As of 16 April 2019

Note: Flags indicate national team as defined under FIFA eligibility rules; some limited exceptions apply. Players may hold more than one non-FIFA nationality.

No.	Pos.	Nation	Player
1	GK	FRA	Benoît Costil (captain)
3	DF	ESP	Sergi Palencia (on loan from Barcelona)
4	DF	FRA	Jules Koundé
5	MF	BRA	Otávio
6	DF	POL	Igor Lewczuk
7	FW	FRA	Jimmy Briand
8	FW	FRA	Yann Karamoh (on loan from Inter Milan)
9	FW	DEN	Andreas Cornelius (on loan from Atalanta)
10	MF	NGR	Samuel Kalu
11	FW	GUI	François Kamano
12	FW	FRA	Nicolas de Préville
13	MF	SEN	Younousse Sankharé
14	DF	SRB	Vukašin Jovanović
16	GK	FRA	Gaëtan Poussin
17	MF	FRA	Aurélien Tchouaméni

No.	Pos.	Nation	Player
18	MF	CZE	Jaroslav Plašil
19	MF	FRA	Yacine Adli
20	DF	SEN	Youssouf Sabaly
24	MF	FRA	Albert Lottin
25	DF	BRA	Pablo
26	MF	CRO	Toma Bašić
27	FW	ENG	Josh Maja
28	MF	FRA	Zaydou Youssouf
29	MF	FRA	Maxime Poundjé
31	FW	FRA	Ibrahim Diarra
32	FW	FRA	Michaël Nilor
33	DF	MAC	David Cardoso
34	DF	FRA	Till Cissokho
35	MF	MAR	Yassine Benrahou
40	GK	FRA	Over Mandanda

=== On loan ===
Note: Flags indicate national team as defined under FIFA eligibility rules; some limited exceptions apply. Players may hold more than one non-FIFA nationality.

No.	Pos.	Nation	Player
—	GK	FRA	Paul Bernardoni (at Nîmes)
—	GK	FRA	Jérôme Prior (at Miedź Legnica)
—	DF	FRA	Paul Baysse (at Caen)
—	DF	ITA	Raoul Bellanova (at Milan)
—	MF	DEN	Lukas Lerager (at Genoa)

No.	Pos.	Nation	Player
—	MF	ARG	Daniel Mancini (at Auxerre)
—	MF	ARG	Valentín Vada (at Saint-Étienne)
—	FW	GAB	Aaron Boupendza (at Tours)
—	FW	BRA	Jonathan Cafú (at Red Star Belgrade)
—	FW	FRA	Alexandre Mendy (at Guingamp)

== Transfers ==
=== In ===
Date	Pos.	Player	Age	Moved from	Fee	Notes

==== Loans in ====
Date	Pos.	Player	Age	Loaned from	Return date	Notes

=== Out ===
Date	Pos.	Player	Age	Moved to	Fee	Notes
1 July 2018	DF	(Germany) Diego Contento	28	(Germany) Fortuna Düsseldorf	Free Transfer	
1 July 2018	DF	(France) Olivier Verdon	22	(France) Sochaux	Free Transfer	

==== Loans out ====
Date	Pos.	Player	Age	Loaned to	Return date	Notes

== Competitions ==
=== Ligue 1 ===
==== League table ====
Pos	Team	Pld	W	D	L	GF	GA	GD	Pts
12	Nantes	38	13	9	16	48	48	0	48
13	Angers	38	10	16	12	44	49	−5	46
14	Bordeaux	38	10	11	17	34	42	−8	41
15	Amiens	38	9	11	18	31	52	−21	38
16	Toulouse	38	8	14	16	35	57	−22	38

Source: Ligue 1 and Soccerway
Rules for classification: 1) Points; 2) Goal difference; 3) Head-to-head points; 4) Head-to-head goal difference; 5) Head-to-head goals scored; 6) Head-to-head away goals scored; 7) Goals scored; 8) Away goals scored; 9) Most goals scored in single league match; 10) Fairplay ranking.

==== Results summary ====
Overall								Home						Away					
Pld	W	D	L	GF	GA	GD	Pts	W	D	L	GF	GA	GD	W	D	L	GF	GA	GD
38	10	11	17	34	42	−8	41	7	6	6	24	21	+3	3	5	11	10	21	−11

Last updated: 24 May 2019.
Source: Results

==== Results by round ====
Round	1	2	3	4	5	6	7	8	9	10	11	12	13	14	15	16	17	18	19	20	21	22	23	24	25	26	27	28	29	30	31	32	33	34	35	36	37	38
Ground	H	A	H	A	H	A	H	A	H	A	H	A	H	A	H	H	A	A	H	A	H	A	H	A	H	A	H	A	H	A	H	A	A	H	H	A	H	A
Result	L	L	W	L	D	W	W	D	W	L	L	D	D	D	D	W	W	L	D	L	W	L	D	L	W	L	L	D	D	D	W	L	L	L	L	L	L	W
Position	18	19	15	19	19	14	10	9	7	8	8	11	11	12	11	10	12	12	12	13	10	12	12	13	13	13	13	13	13	13	13	13	14	14	14	14	14	14

Source: Ligue 1
A = Away; H = Home; W = Win; D = Draw; L = Loss

==== Matches ====
12 August 2018 1	Bordeaux	0–2	Strasbourg	Bordeaux
17:00 CEST (UTC+2)	Pablo (red card) 13'; Baysse (yellow card) 74'	Report	Sissoko 68' da Costa 78'	Stadium: Matmut Atlantique; Attendance: 23,079; Referee: Hakim Ben el Hadj

19 August 2018 2	Toulouse	2–1	Bordeaux	Toulouse
17:00 CEST (UTC+2)	Leya Iseka 44'; Moubandje (yellow card) 49'; Dossevi 67'	Report	Kamano 50'; Poundjé (yellow card) 87'	Stadium: Stadium Municipal; Attendance: 15,381; Referee: François Letexier

26 August 2018 3	Bordeaux	2–1	Monaco	Bordeaux
17:00 CEST (UTC+2)	Kamano 48', (yellow card) 89', (goal) 90+2' (pen.)	Report	Pellegri 63', (yellow card) 90+3'; Benaglio (yellow card) 85'	Stadium: Matmut Atlantique; Attendance: 21,607; Referee: Clément Turpin

2 September 2018 4	Rennes	2–0	Bordeaux	Rennes
17:00 CEST (UTC+2)	André 12'; Bensebaini 16'	Report	Poundjé (yellow card) 49'; Lerager (yellow card) 55'; Sankharé (yellow card) 60'	Stadium: Roazhon Park; Attendance: 23,817; Referee: Benoît Bastien

16 September 2018 5	Bordeaux	3–3	Nîmes	Bordeaux
17:00 CEST (UTC+2)	Briand 26', 56'; Palencia (yellow card) 49'; Kalu 57'; Plašil (yellow card) 80'	Report	Guillaume 32'; Bobichon 45'; Bozok 78'	Stadium: Matmut Atlantique; Attendance: 15,895; Referee: Antony Gautier

23 September 2018 6	Guingamp	1–3	Bordeaux	Guingamp
17:00 CEST (UTC+2)	Phiri (yellow card) 56'; Thuram 70' (pen.)	Report	Sankharé (yellow card) 18'; Kamano 53'; Lerager (yellow card) 58'; Sabaly (yellow card) 67'; Pablo (yellow card) 68'; Karamoh 80'; Préville 90+5'	Stadium: Stade de Roudourou; Attendance: 14,772; Referee: Frank Schneider

26 September 2018 7	Bordeaux	1–0	Lille	Bordeaux
19:00 CEST (UTC+2)	Kamano 7'; Kalu (yellow card) 61'	Report	Soumaoro (yellow card) 55' (yellow-red card) 89'; Mendes (yellow card) 84'	Stadium: Matmut Atlantique; Attendance: 17,395; Referee: Karim Abed

29 September 2018 8	Reims	0–0	Bordeaux	Reims
20:00 CEST (UTC+2)	Romao (yellow card) 39'; Chavalerin (yellow card) 85'	Report	Cornelius (yellow card) 41'; Tchouaméni (yellow card) 70'; Poundjé (yellow card) 90+1'	Stadium: Stade Auguste Delaune; Attendance: 13,406; Referee: Hakim Ben el Hadj

7 October 2018 9	Bordeaux	3–0	Nantes	Bordeaux
15:00 CEST (UTC+2)	Karamoh 5'; Kamano 7', 42' (pen.); Kalu (yellow card) 82'	Report	Miazga (yellow card) 41'	Stadium: Matmut Atlantique; Attendance: 18,307; Referee: François Letexier

21 October 2018 10	Montpellier	2–0	Bordeaux	Montpellier
15:00 CEST (UTC+2)	Laborde 17'; Mendes (yellow card) 33'; Skhiri (yellow card) 42'; Delort 53' (pen.)	Report	Karamoh (yellow card) 42'; Sabaly (yellow card) 47'; Lerager (yellow card) 50'; Pablo (yellow card) 53'	Stadium: Stade de la Mosson; Attendance: 12,491; Referee: Frank Schneider

28 October 2018 11	Bordeaux	0–1	Nice	Bordeaux
17:00 CET (UTC+1)	Sankharé (yellow card) 30'; Cornelius (yellow card) 73'	Report	Cyprien 54'; Balotelli (yellow card) 67'; Benítez (yellow card) 72'; Dante (yellow card) 86'	Stadium: Matmut Atlantique; Attendance: 20,730; Referee: Jérôme Brisard

3 November 2018 12	Lyon	1–1	Bordeaux	Décines-Charpieu
17:00 CET (UTC+1)	Aouar 45'; Traoré (yellow card) 68'	Report	Cornelius 73'; Palencia (yellow card) 80'	Stadium: Parc Olympique Lyonnais; Attendance: 46,653; Referee: Benoît Millot

11 November 2018 13	Bordeaux	0–0	Caen	Bordeaux
15:00 CET (UTC+1)	Palencia (yellow card) 20'; Lerager (yellow card) 28'; Kamano (yellow card) 44'; Tchouaméni (yellow card) 55'	Report	Sankoh (yellow card) 21'; Mbengue (yellow card) 29'; Guilbert (yellow card) 44'	Stadium: Matmut Atlantique; Attendance: 15,352; Referee: Nicolas Rainville

24 November 2018 14	Dijon	0–0	Bordeaux	Dijon
20:00 CET (UTC+1)	Rosier (yellow card) 23'; Abeid (yellow card) 29'	Report	Kamano (yellow card) 49'	Stadium: Stade Gaston Gérard; Attendance: 12,285; Referee: François Letexier

2 December 2018 15	Bordeaux	2–2	Paris Saint-Germain	Bordeaux
21:00 CET (UTC+1)	Briand 53'; Palencia (yellow card) 63'; Cornelius 84'	Report	Kehrer (yellow card) 32'; Neymar 34'; Mbappé 66'; Verratti (yellow card) 77'	Stadium: Matmut Atlantique; Attendance: 40,841; Referee: Frank Schneider

5 December 2018 16	Bordeaux	3–2	Saint-Étienne	Bordeaux
19:00 CET (UTC+1)	Briand 22'; Kamano 57' (pen.); Sankharé (yellow card) 75'; Sabaly (yellow card) 83'; Pablo 90'	Report	Diony 16'; Khazri (yellow card) 65', (goal) 67'; Saliba (yellow card) 56'; Selnæs (yellow card) 75'	Stadium: Matmut Atlantique; Attendance: 23,375; Referee: Clément Turpin

8 December 2018 17	Angers	Postponed	Bordeaux	Angers
20:45 CET (UTC+1)		Report		Stadium: Stade Raymond Kopa

16 December 2018 18	Marseille	Postponed	Bordeaux	Marseille
19:00 CET (UTC+1)				Stadium: Stade Vélodrome

23 December 2018 19	Bordeaux	1–1	Amiens	Bordeaux
17:00 CET (UTC+1)	Kalu 22'	Report	Bodmer (yellow card) 5'; Timité (yellow card) 36'; Gnahoré 87'	Stadium: Matmut Atlantique; Attendance: 23,343; Referee: Mikael Lesage

12 January 2019 20	Nice	1–0	Bordeaux	Nice
20:00 CET (UTC+1)	Saint-Maximin 16' (pen.); Hérelle (yellow card) 22'; Atal (yellow card) 90+4'	Report	Kalu (yellow card) 26'; Bašić (yellow card) 63'; Koundé (yellow card) 78'	Stadium: Allianz Riviera; Attendance: 15,191; Referee: Nicolas Rainville

15 January 2019 17	Angers	1–2	Bordeaux	Angers
19:00 CET (UTC+1)	Pavlović 64'; Bamba (yellow card) 74'	Report	Kalu 31'; Karamoh 90+2'	Stadium: Stade Raymond Kopa; Attendance: 10,927; Referee: Eric Wattellier
Note: Rescheduled from 8 December 2018.

20 January 2019 21	Bordeaux	1–0	Dijon	Bordeaux
20:00 CET (UTC+1)	Karamoh (yellow card) 11'; Cornelius (yellow card) 64', (goal) 77'; Jovanović (yellow card) 71'	Report	Amalfitano (red card) 34'; Abeid (yellow card) 51'; Haddadi (yellow card) 62'; Yambéré (yellow card) 71'	Stadium: Matmut Atlantique; Attendance: 13,380; Referee: Johan Hamel

26 January 2019 22	Strasbourg	1–0	Bordeaux	Strasbourg
20:00 CET (UTC+1)	Koné (yellow card) 82'; Martinez (yellow card) 84'; Lala 90+3'	Report	Jovanović (yellow card) 49'; Briand (yellow card) 88'	Stadium: Stade de la Meinau; Attendance: 25,214; Referee: Florent Batta

2 February 2019 23	Bordeaux	Postponed	Guingamp	Bordeaux
20:00 CET (UTC+1)		Report		Stadium: Matmut Atlantique

5 February 2019 18	Marseille	1–0	Bordeaux	Marseille
19:00 CET (UTC+1)	Kamara 42'; Sakai (yellow card) 55'; Sanson (yellow card) 61'; Sertic (yellow card) 90+2'	Report	Kalu (red card) 25'; Otávio (yellow card) 77'; Sankharé (yellow card) 89'	Stadium: Stade Vélodrome; Attendance: 0 Referee: Jérôme Brisard
Note: The match, originally scheduled for 16 December 2018, was postponed due to security concerns as a result of the yellow vests movement. The match was played behind closed doors as Marseille were punished for crowd trouble in their game against Lille.

9 February 2019 24	Paris Saint-Germain	1–0	Bordeaux	Paris
17:00 CET (UTC+1)	Nsoki (yellow card) 10'; Silva (yellow card) 32'; Cavani 42' (pen.); Diaby (yellow card) 62'	Report	Sankharé (yellow card) 2'; Kamano (yellow card) 18'; De Préville (yellow card) 52'	Stadium: Parc des Princes; Attendance: 47,274; Referee: Ruddy Buquet

17 February 2019 25	Bordeaux	2–1	Toulouse	Bordeaux
15:00 CET (UTC+1)	Bašić 2'; Palencia (yellow card) 68'; Jovanović (yellow card) 77'; Briand 82'	Report	Cahuzac (yellow card) 29', (goal) 70'; Sangaré (yellow card) 38'	Stadium: Matmut Atlantique; Attendance: 19,332; Referee: Hakim Ben El Hadj

20 February 2019 23	Bordeaux	0–0	Guingamp	Bordeaux
19:00 CET (UTC+1)	Jovanović (yellow card) 36'; Cornelius (yellow card) 90+1'	Report	Phiri (yellow card) 77'; Deaux (yellow card) 90+3'	Stadium: Matmut Atlantique; Attendance: 14,527; Referee: Willy Delajod
Note: Rescheduled from 2 February 2019.

24 February 2019 26	Nantes	1–0	Bordeaux	Nantes
15:00 CET (UTC+1)	Ié (yellow card) 17'; Pallois 51'; Kwateng (yellow card) 75'	Report	Poundjé (yellow card) 73'; Koundé (yellow card) 83'	Stadium: Stade de la Beaujoire; Attendance: 21,910; Referee: Antony Gautier

5 March 2019 27	Bordeaux	1–2	Montpellier	Bordeaux
19:00 CET (UTC+1)	Bašić 35'; De Préville (yellow card) 39'	Report	Lasne 20'; Congré (yellow card) 42', (goal) 51'	Stadium: Matmut Atlantique; Attendance: 14,522; Referee: Jérôme Brisard

9 March 2019 28	Monaco	1–1	Bordeaux	Monaco
20:00 CET (UTC+1)	Falcao 48', (yellow card) 64'; Ballo-Touré (yellow card) 54'; Martins (yellow card) 67'; Jemerson (yellow card) 69'; Silva (yellow card) 82'	Report	Briand 65' (pen.); Maja (yellow card) 90+1'; Tchouaméni (yellow card) 90+1'	Stadium: Stade Louis II; Attendance: 8,042; Referee: François Letexier

17 March 2019 29	Bordeaux	1–1	Rennes	Bordeaux
17:00 CET (UTC+1)	Jovanović (yellow card) 29'; Kamano 59'; Bašić (yellow card) 68'	Report	Bourigeaud (yellow card) 14'; Da Silva (yellow card) 56'; Traoré (yellow card) 85'; Niang 90+2'	Stadium: Matmut Atlantique; Attendance: 19,807; Referee: Eric Wattellier

31 March 2019 30	Amiens	0–0	Bordeaux	Amiens
15:00 CEST (UTC+2)	Blin (yellow card) 64'	Report	Jovanović (yellow card) 48'; Kamano (yellow card) 75'; De Préville (yellow card) 87'	Stadium: Stade de la Licorne; Attendance: 11,765; Referee: Mikael Lesage

5 April 2019 31	Bordeaux	2–0	Marseille	Bordeaux
20:45 CEST (UTC+2)	Kamano 27' (pen.); Koundé (yellow card) 68'; De Préville 71'; Pablo (yellow card) 81', (red card) 82'	Report	Payet (yellow card) 45+2'; Kamara (yellow card) 61'; Balotelli (yellow card) 83'	Stadium: Matmut Atlantique; Attendance: 34,152; Referee: Hakim Ben El Hadj

14 April 2019 32	Saint-Étienne	3–0	Bordeaux	Saint-Étienne
17:00 CEST (UTC+2)	Kolodziejczak (yellow card) 3'; Cabella (yellow card) 46'; Khazri 56' (pen.); Debuchy 74', 90'	Report		Stadium: Stade Geoffroy-Guichard; Attendance: 33,935; Referee: Ruddy Buquet

20 April 2019 33	Nîmes	2–1	Bordeaux	Nîmes
20:00 CEST (UTC+2)	Savanier 16' (pen.); Ripart 63'	Report	Maja 13'; Koundé (yellow card) 16'; Jovanović (yellow card) 28'; Kamano (yellow card) 41'; De Préville (yellow card) 83'	Stadium: Stade des Costières; Attendance: 13,910; Referee: Florent Batta

26 April 2019 34	Bordeaux	2–3	Lyon	Bordeaux
20:45 CEST (UTC+2)	Briand 34'; De Préville 38', (yellow card) 44'; Otávio (yellow card) 61'; Jovanović (red card) 73'; Palencia (yellow card) 90+2'	Report	Depay 14'; Cornet 67'; Dubois (yellow card) 77'; Dembélé 85'; Fekir (yellow card) 88'; Traoré (yellow card) 90+4'	Stadium: Matmut Atlantique; Attendance: 27,455; Referee: Benoît Bastien

4 May 2019 35	Bordeaux	0–1	Angers	Bordeaux
20:00 CEST (UTC+2)	Lauray (yellow card) 38'; Youssouf (yellow card) 83'	Report	Bahoken 40'	Stadium: Matmut Atlantique; Attendance: 18,584; Referee: Nicolas Rainville

12 May 2019 36	Lille	1–0	Bordeaux	Villeneuve-d'Ascq
17:00 CEST (UTC+2)	Rémy 27', (yellow card) 47'; Soumaré (yellow card) 59'	Report	Plašil (yellow card) 29'; Adli (yellow card) 32'; Bašić (yellow card) 62'; Otávio (yellow card) 76'; Pablo (red card) 88'	Stadium: Stade Pierre-Mauroy; Attendance: 41,413; Referee: Mikael Lesage

18 May 2019 37	Bordeaux	0–1	Reims	Bordeaux
21:00 CEST (UTC+2)		Report	Suk 2'; Foket (yellow card) 90+2'	Stadium: Matmut Atlantique; Attendance: 14,247; Referee: Eric Wattellier

24 May 2019 38	Caen	0–1	Bordeaux	Caen
21:05 CEST (UTC+2)	Ninga (yellow card) 79'	Report	Sankharé 19'; Otávio (yellow card) 78'	Stadium: Stade Michel d'Ornano; Attendance: 19,355; Referee: Clément Turpin

=== Coupe de France ===
6 January 2019 Round of 64	Bordeaux	0–1	Le Havre	Bordeaux
17:15 CET (UTC+1)	Koundé (yellow card) 35'; Plašil (yellow card) 38'	Report	Lekhal (yellow card) 22'; Youga (yellow card) 31'; Assifuah 48'	Stadium: Matmut Atlantique; Attendance: 8,797; Referee: Jérôme Brisard

=== Coupe de la Ligue ===
19 December 2018 Round of 16	Dijon	0–1	Bordeaux	Dijon
21:05 CET (UTC+1)	Balmont (yellow card) 10'; Haddadi (yellow card) 74'	Report	Palencia (yellow card) 16'; Kalu (yellow card) 43'; Bašić 66'	Stadium: Stade Gaston Gérard; Attendance: 4,661; Referee: Florent Batta

9 January 2019 Quarter-finals	Bordeaux	1–0	Le Havre	Bordeaux
21:05 CET (UTC+1)	Kalu (yellow card) 45', (goal) 70'; De Préville (yellow card) 90+2'	Report	Basque (yellow card) 29'	Stadium: Matmut Atlantique; Attendance: 7,600; Referee: Ruddy Buquet

30 January 2019 Semi-finals	Strasbourg	3–2	Bordeaux	Strasbourg
18:45 CET (UTC+1)	Sissoko (yellow card) 45'; Ajorque 49'; Mothiba 55', 60'	Report	Sankharé 14'; Briand 82', (yellow card) 82'; Bašić (yellow card) 90'	Stadium: Stade de la Meinau; Attendance: 25,090; Referee: Antony Gautier

=== UEFA Europa League ===
==== Second qualifying round ====
26 July 2018 First leg	Ventspils (Latvia)	0–1	(France) Bordeaux	Ventspils, Latvia
16:45 (17:45 EEST)	Neziri (yellow card) 69'; Alfa (yellow card) 87'	Report	Youssouf 3'; Kamano (yellow card) 68'; Koundé (yellow card) 77'	Stadium: Ventspils Olimpiskais Stadions; Attendance: 3,055; Referee: Sergey Lapochkin (Russia)

2 August 2018 Second leg	Bordeaux (France)	2–1 (3–1 agg.)	(Latvia) Ventspils	Bordeaux, France
20:45 CEST (UTC+02:00)	Kamano 9'; Koundé 48'; Lewczuk (yellow card) 85'	Report	Mamah (yellow card) 41'; Akinyemi 66'; Tālbergs (yellow card) 90+1'	Stadium: Nouveau Stade de Bordeaux; Attendance: 15,863; Referee: Hugo Miguel (Portugal)

==== Third qualifying round ====
9 August 2018 First leg	Mariupol (Ukraine)	1–3	(France) Bordeaux	Odesa, Ukraine
19:00 (20:00 EEST)	Myshnyov 7'; Churko (yellow card) 41'; Demiri (yellow card) 81'	Report	Laborde 33', 37'; Tchouaméni 49'	Stadium: Chornomorets Stadium; Attendance: 6,587; Referee: Ivan Bebek (Croatia)

16 August 2018 Second leg	Bordeaux (France)	2–1 (5–2 agg.)	(Ukraine) Mariupol	Bordeaux, France
20:45 CEST (UTC+02:00)	Poundjé 54'; Sankharé 56'; Lewczuk (yellow card) 90'	Report	Boryachuk (yellow card) 22'; Fomin 66'; Pikhalyonok (yellow card) 88'	Stadium: Nouveau Stade de Bordeaux; Attendance: 11,375; Referee: Andrew Dallas (Scotland)

==== Play-off round ====
23 August 2018 First leg	Gent (Belgium)	0–0	(France) Bordeaux	Ghent, Belgium
20:45 CEST (UTC+02:00)		Report	Koundé (yellow card) 41' (yellow-red card) 90+2'	Stadium: Ghelamco Arena; Attendance: 13,239; Referee: Aliyar Aghayev (Azerbaijan)

30 August 2018 Second leg	Bordeaux (France)	2–0 (2–0 agg.)	(Belgium) Gent	Bordeaux, France
20:45 CEST (UTC+02:00)	Plašil (yellow card) 10'; Kamano 10'; Tchouaméni (yellow card) 17'; Briand 64' (pen.); Lerager (yellow card) 75'	Report	Asare (yellow card) 43'	Stadium: Nouveau Stade de Bordeaux; Attendance: 35,039; Referee: Jesús Gil Manzano (Spain)

==== Group stage ====
Pos	Team	Pld	W	D	L	GF	GA	GD	Pts	Qualification	ZEN	SLP	BOR	KOB
1	(Russia) Zenit Saint Petersburg	6	3	2	1	6	5	+1	11	Advance to knockout phase	—	1–0	2–1	1–0
2	(Czech Republic) Slavia Prague	6	3	1	2	4	3	+1	10	Advance to knockout phase	2–0	—	1–0	0–0
3	(France) Bordeaux	6	2	1	3	6	6	0	7		1–1	2–0	—	1–2
4	(Denmark) Copenhagen	6	1	2	3	3	5	−2	5		1–1	0–1	0–1	—

Source: UEFA
Rules for classification: Group stage tiebreakers

20 September 2018 1	Slavia Prague (Czech Republic)	1–0	(France) Bordeaux	Prague, Czech Republic
18:55	Ngadeu-Ngadjui (yellow card) 29'; Zmrhal 35'	Report	Sankharé (yellow card) 66'; Palencia (yellow card) 68'; Kalu (yellow card) 75'	Stadium: Eden Arena; Attendance: 16,548; Referee: Bas Nijhuis (Netherlands)

4 October 2018 2	Bordeaux (France)	1–2	(Denmark) Copenhagen	Bordeaux, France
18:55	Briand (yellow card) 13'; Sankharé (yellow card) 17', (goal) 84'; Pablo (yellow card) 65'	Report	Kvist (yellow card) 38'; Sotiriou 42', (yellow card) 52'; Papagiannopoulos (yellow card) 45'; Zeca (yellow card) 70' (yellow-red card) 90+3'; Skov 90+2'	Stadium: Nouveau Stade de Bordeaux; Attendance: 11,860; Referee: Roi Reinshreiber (Israel)

25 October 2018 3	Zenit Saint Petersburg (Russia)	2–1	(France) Bordeaux	Saint Petersburg, Russia
21:00	Paredes (yellow card) 38'; Dzyuba 41'; Yerokhin (yellow card) 78'; Kuzyayev 85'; Neto (yellow card) 87'; Ivanović (yellow card) 90+2'	Report	Briand 26'; Otávio (yellow card) 90+2'	Stadium: Krestovsky Stadium; Attendance: 45,723; Referee: Felix Brych (Germany)

8 November 2018 4	Bordeaux (France)	1–1	(Russia) Zenit Saint Petersburg	Bordeaux, France
21:00	Kamano 35' (pen.), (yellow card) 65'; Jovanović (yellow card) 41'	Report	Anyukov (yellow card) 23'; Nabiullin (yellow card) 31'; Lunyov (yellow card) 35'; Neto (yellow card) 59'; Zabolotny 72'	Stadium: Nouveau Stade de Bordeaux; Attendance: 8,907; Referee: Harald Lechner (Austria)

29 November 2018 5	Bordeaux (France)	2–0	(Czech Republic) Slavia Prague	Bordeaux, France
18:55	De Préville 49'; Sankharé (yellow card) 85'; Koundé 90+5'	Report	Bořil (yellow card) 52'; Deli (yellow card) 56'; Olayinka (yellow card) 59'	Stadium: Nouveau Stade de Bordeaux; Attendance: 6,311; Referee: Fábio Veríssimo (Portugal)

13 December 2018 6	Copenhagen (Denmark)	0–1	(France) Bordeaux	Copenhagen, Denmark
21:00	Skov (yellow card) 22'; Falk (yellow card) 29'	Report	Briand (yellow card) 25', (goal) 73'	Stadium: Parken Stadium; Attendance: 18,209; Referee: Hüseyin Göçek (Turkey)

== Statistics ==
=== Appearances and goals ===
No.	Pos	Nat	Player	Total		Ligue 1		Coupe de France		Coupe de la Ligue		UEFA Europa League	
No.	Pos	Nat	Player	Apps	Goals	Apps	Goals	Apps	Goals	Apps	Goals	Apps	Goals
Goalkeepers
1	GK	(France) FRA	Benoît Costil	51	0	37	0	1	0	1	0	12	0
16	GK	(France) FRA	Gaëtan Poussin	3	0	1	0	0	0	2	0	0	0
40	GK	(France) FRA	Over Mandanda	0	0	0	0	0	0	0	0	0	0
Defenders
3	DF	(Spain) ESP	Sergi Palencia	31	0	22+3	0	1	0	1	0	4	0
4	DF	(France) FRA	Jules Koundé	51	2	37	0	1	0	3	0	10	2
6	DF	(Poland) POL	Igor Lewczuk	13	0	3+3	0	0	0	0	0	6+1	0
14	DF	(Serbia) SRB	Vukašin Jovanović	19	0	15+1	0	1	0	1	0	1	0
20	DF	(Senegal) SEN	Youssouf Sabaly	31	0	21+2	0	1	0	3	0	4	0
25	DF	(Brazil) BRA	Pablo	39	1	25	1	0	0	2	0	12	0
33	DF	(France) FRA	Alexandre Lauray	3	0	3	0	0	0	0	0	0	0
34	DF	(France) FRA	Till Cissokho	1	0	1	0	0	0	0	0	0	0
Midfielders
5	MF	(Brazil) BRA	Otávio	43	0	33	0	0	0	3	0	4+3	0
10	MF	(Nigeria) NGR	Samuel Kalu	32	4	14+7	3	1	0	3	1	6+1	0
13	MF	(Senegal) SEN	Younousse Sankharé	33	4	17+5	1	0	0	1	1	9+1	2
17	MF	(France) FRA	Aurélien Tchouaméni	19	1	8+2	0	0	0	0	0	7+2	1
18	MF	(Czech Republic) CZE	Jaroslav Plašil	35	0	16+7	0	1	0	2	0	8+1	0
19	MF	(France) FRA	Yacine Adli	7	0	2+5	0	0	0	0	0	0	0
24	MF	(France) FRA	Albert Lottin	2	0	0+2	0	0	0	0	0	0	0
26	MF	(Croatia) CRO	Toma Bašić	27	3	16+7	2	1	0	1+2	1	0	0
28	MF	(France) FRA	Zaydou Youssouf	19	1	7+4	0	0	0	0	0	6+2	1
29	MF	(France) FRA	Maxime Poundjé	43	1	28+2	0	0	0	2+1	0	10	1
35	MF	(Morocco) MAR	Yassine Benrahou	4	0	1+3	0	0	0	0	0	0	0
Forwards
7	FW	(France) FRA	Jimmy Briand	46	11	28+7	7	1	0	1+2	1	6+1	3
8	FW	(France) FRA	Yann Karamoh	32	3	13+9	3	0+1	0	3	0	1+5	0
9	FW	(Denmark) DEN	Andreas Cornelius	29	3	6+14	3	0+1	0	1+2	0	3+2	0
11	FW	(Guinea) GUI	François Kamano	51	13	29+8	10	1	0	1+1	0	8+3	3
12	FW	(France) FRA	Nicolas de Préville	34	4	14+9	3	1	0	0+1	0	5+4	1
27	FW	(England) ENG	Josh Maja	7	1	3+4	1	0	0	0	0	0	0
	FW	(France) FRA	Driss Trichard	1	0	1	0	0	0	0	0	0	0
Players transferred out during the season
2	DF	(Serbia) SRB	Milan Gajić	2	0	1	0	0	0	0	0	1	0
8	DF	(France) FRA	Paul Baysse	1	0	0+1	0	0	0	0	0	0	0
19	MF	(Denmark) DEN	Lukas Lerager	28	0	15+3	0	0	0	1	0	8+1	0
23	MF	(Argentina) ARG	Valentín Vada	7	0	0+2	0	0+1	0	1	0	0+3	0
24	FW	(France) FRA	Gaëtan Laborde	4	2	1	0	0	0	0	0	1+2	2

Last updated: 24 May 2019
Source: Competitions
