= 2017–18 FC Girondins de Bordeaux season =

Bordeaux
2017–18 season
- Chairman: Jean-Louis Triaud
- Manager: Jocelyn Gourvennec (until 18 January 2018); Gus Poyet (from 20 January 2018)
- Stadium: Nouveau Stade de Bordeaux
- Ligue 1: 6th
- Coupe de France: Round of 64 (Eliminated by US Granville)
- Coupe de la Ligue: Last 16 (Eliminated by Toulouse)
- UEFA Europa League: Third qualifying round (Eliminated by Videoton)
- Top goalscorer: League: Malcom (12); All: Malcom (12)
- Highest home attendance: 41,290 vs. Paris Saint-Germain (22 April 2018)
- Lowest home attendance: 14,368 vs. Caen (16 January 2018)
Home colours	Away colours	Third colours

The 2017–18 FC Girondins de Bordeaux season was the 137th professional season of the club since its creation in 1881. Bordeaux finished their domestic season in 6th place, qualifying for the UEFA Europa League next season.

== Players ==
As of 31 August 2017.

Note: Flags indicate national team as defined under FIFA eligibility rules; some limited exceptions apply. Players may hold more than one non-FIFA nationality.

No.	Pos.	Nation	Player
1	GK	FRA	Benoit Costil
2	DF	SRB	Milan Gajić
3	DF	GER	Diego Contento
5	MF	BRA	Otávio
6	DF	POL	Igor Lewczuk
7	FW	BRA	Malcom
8	DF	FRA	Paul Baysse
9	FW	DEN	Martin Braithwaite (on loan from Middlesbrough)
10	MF	FRA	Soualiho Meïté (on loan from Monaco)
11	FW	GUI	François Kamano
12	FW	FRA	Nicolas de Préville
13	MF	SEN	Younousse Sankharé
15	FW	FRA	Alexandre Mendy
16	GK	FRA	Gaëtan Poussin
17	MF	BRA	Matheus Pereira (on loan from Juventus)
18	MF	CZE	Jaroslav Plašil (captain)

No.	Pos.	Nation	Player
19	MF	DEN	Lukas Lerager
20	DF	SEN	Youssouf Sabaly
21	DF	FRA	Théo Pellenard
22	MF	BRA	Jonathan Cafu
23	MF	ARG	Valentín Vada
24	FW	FRA	Gaëtan Laborde
25	DF	BRA	Pablo
26	DF	BEN	Olivier Verdon
29	MF	FRA	Maxime Poundjé
30	GK	FRA	Jérôme Prior
31	DF	FRA	Jules Koundé
32	MF	FRA	Zaydou Youssouf
33	FW	FRA	Ervin Taha
34	MF	FRA	Aurélien Tchouaméni
35	DF	FRA	Thomas Carrique
40	GK	FRA	Over Mandanda

=== On loan ===
Note: Flags indicate national team as defined under FIFA eligibility rules; some limited exceptions apply. Players may hold more than one non-FIFA nationality.

No.	Pos.	Nation	Player
—	GK	FRA	Paul Bernardoni (on loan to Clermont)
4	DF	SRB	Vukašin Jovanović (on loan to Eibar)
—	MF	ARG	Daniel Mancini (on loan to Tours)

No.	Pos.	Nation	Player
—	FW	GAB	Aaron Boupendza (on loan to Pau)
—	FW	URU	Diego Rolán (on loan to Málaga)

== Transfers ==
=== In ===
Date	Pos.	Player	Age	Moved from	Fee	Notes
1 July 2017	DF	(France) Youssouf Sabaly	24	(France) Paris Saint-Germain	€4,000,000	
1 July 2017	MF	(Denmark) Lukas Lerager	23	(Belgium) Zulte Waregem	€3,500,000	
1 July 2017	FW	(France) Alexandre Mendy	23	(France) Guingamp	€600,000	
1 July 2017	GK	(France) Benoît Costil	29	(France) Rennes	Free transfer	
14 July 2017	DF	(Serbia) Vukašin Jovanović	21	(Russia) Zenit Saint Petersburg	Undisclosed	
8 August 2017	MF	(Brazil) Otávio	23	(Brazil) Atlético Paranaense	€5,000,000	
9 August 2017	MF	(Brazil) Jonathan Cafu	26	(Bulgaria) Ludogorets Razgrad	€7,500,000	
31 August 2017	FW	(France) Nicolas de Préville	26	(France) Lille	€10,000,000	
10 January 2018	DF	(France) Paul Baysse	29	(Spain) Málaga	€1,200,000	

==== Loans in ====
Date	Pos.	Player	Age	Loaned from	Return date	Notes
31 August 2017	MF	(Brazil) Matheus Pereira	19	(Italy) Juventus	31 January 2018	
2 January 2018	MF	(France) Soualiho Meïté	23	(France) AS Monaco	30 June 2018	
31 January 2018	FW	(Denmark) Martin Braithwaite	26	(England) Middlesbrough	30 June 2018	

=== Out ===
Date	Pos.	Player	Age	Moved to	Fee	Notes
1 July 2017	FW	(France) Jérémy Ménez	30	(Turkey) Antalyaspor	Undisclosed	
1 July 2017	FW	(France) Enzo Crivelli	22	(France) Angers	€4,000,000	
1 July 2017	DF	(Central African Republic) Cédric Yambéré	26	(France) Dijon	€500,000	
1 July 2017	FW	(France) Jorris Romil	22	(France) Valenciennes	Free transfer	
1 July 2017	GK	(France) Cédric Carrasso	35	Free agent		
1 July 2017	MF	(Mali) Abdou Traoré	29	Free agent		
1 July 2017	MF	(France) Nicolas Maurice-Belay	32	Free agent		
4 July 2017	MF	(Algeria) Adam Ounas	20	(Italy) Napoli	€10,000,000	
21 July 2017	MF	(Cameroon) Kévin Soni	19	(Spain) Peralada	Free transfer	
27 July 2017	DF	(France) Nicolas Pallois	29	(France) Nantes	€2,500,000	
28 July 2017	DF	(France) Frédéric Guilbert	22	(France) SM Caen	€1,500,000	
8 August 2017	MF	(Uruguay) Mauro Arambarri	21	(Uruguay) Boston River	Free transfer	
30 August 2017	FW	(Sweden) Isaac Kiese Thelin	25	(Belgium) Anderlecht	Undisclosed	
31 August 2017	MF	(Ivory Coast) Thomas Touré	23	(France) Angers	€1,700,000	
31 August 2017	MF	(France) Younès Kaabouni	22	Free agent		
18 January 2018	MF	(France) Jérémy Toulalan	34	Free agent		

==== Loans out ====
Date	Pos.	Player	Age	Loaned to	Return date	Notes
1 July 2017	GK	(France) Paul Bernardoni	20	(France) Clermont Foot	30 June 2018	
11 August 2017	FW	(Gabon) Aaron Boupendza	21	(France) Pau FC	30 June 2018	
27 August 2017	FW	(Uruguay) Diego Rolán	24	(Spain) Málaga	30 June 2018	
31 August 2017	MF	(Argentina) Daniel Mancini	20	(France) Tours	30 June 2018	
31 January 2018	DF	(Serbia) Vukašin Jovanović	21	(Spain) Eibar	30 June 2018	

== Competitions ==
=== Ligue 1 ===
==== League table ====
Pos	Team	Pld	W	D	L	GF	GA	GD	Pts	Qualification or relegation
4	Marseille	38	22	11	5	80	47	+33	77	Qualification for the Europa League group stage (Note: Since the winners of the 2017–18 Coupe de France and the 2017–18 Coupe de la Ligue, Paris Saint-Germain, qualified for European competition based on league position, the spot awarded to the Coupe de France winners (Europa League group stage) was passed to the fourth-placed team and the spot awarded to the Coupe de la Ligue winners (Europa League third qualifying round) was passed to the sixth-placed team. The fifth-placed team received the spot in Europa League third qualifying round originally designated to the fourth-placed team.)
5	Rennes	38	16	10	12	50	44	+6	58	Qualification for the Europa League group stage
6	Bordeaux	38	16	7	15	53	48	+5	55	Qualification for the Europa League second qualifying round
7	Saint-Étienne	38	15	10	13	47	50	−3	55	
8	Nice	38	15	9	14	53	52	+1	54	

Source: Ligue 1 and Soccerway
Rules for classification: 1) Points; 2) Goal difference; 3) Head-to-head points; 4) Head-to-head goal difference; 5) Head-to-head goals scored; 6) Head-to-head away goals; 7) Goals scored; 8) Away goals scored; 9) Most goals scored in one league match; 10) Fair-play points

==== Results summary ====
Overall								Home						Away					
Pld	W	D	L	GF	GA	GD	Pts	W	D	L	GF	GA	GD	W	D	L	GF	GA	GD
38	16	7	15	53	48	+5	55	9	4	6	27	23	+4	7	3	9	26	25	+1

Last updated: 7 June 2017.
Source: Results

==== Results by round ====
Round	1	2	3	4	5	6	7	8	9	10	11	12	13	14	15	16	17	18	19	20	21	22	23	24	25	26	27	28	29	30	31	32	33	34	35	36	37	38
Ground	A	H	A	H	A	A	H	A	H	A	H	A	H	A	H	A	H	A	H	A	H	A	H	A	H	A	H	A	H	H	A	H	A	H	H	A	H	A
Result	D	W	D	W	D	W	W	L	D	L	L	L	D	L	W	L	L	L	L	W	L	W	W	W	W	L	D	L	D	L	L	W	W	L	W	W	W	W
Position	9	6	6	5	5	4	3	6	7	7	8	9	9	13	10	11	14	15	15	13	13	12	9	8	7	8	8	9	9	11	12	12	10	11	9	9	7	6

Source: Ligue1
A = Away; H = Home; W = Win; D = Draw; L = Loss

==== Matches ====
6 August 2017 1	Angers	2–2	Bordeaux	Angers
17:00	Fulgini 11'; Capelle (yellow card) 63'; Tait (yellow card) 73'; Guillaume 88'; Toko Ekambi (yellow card) 90+1'	Report	Sankharé 27', (yellow card) 90'; Mendy 52'; Kamano (yellow card) 86'	Stadium: Stade Raymond Kopa; Attendance: 11,767; Referee: Sébastien Desiage

12 August 2017 2	Bordeaux	2–0	Metz	Bordeaux
20:00	Vada 44'; Sabaly (yellow card) 55'; Sankharé 64'	Report	Roux (yellow card) 31'; Assou-Ekotto (yellow card) 45+2'	Stadium: Nouveau Stade de Bordeaux; Attendance: 22,095; Referee: Mikael Lesage

19 August 2017 3	Lyon	3–3	Bordeaux	Décines-Charpieu
17:00	Fekir 10'; Tete 23'; Darder (yellow card) 33' (yellow-red card) 36'; Traoré (yellow card) 39', (goal) 75'; Morel (yellow card) 82'	Report	Malcom 41', 90+1'; Lerager (yellow card) 59', (goal) 88'; Cafu (yellow card) 64'	Stadium: Parc Olympique Lyonnais; Attendance: 42,073; Referee: Clément Turpin

26 August 2017 4	Bordeaux	2–1	Troyes	Bordeaux
20:00	Kamano 10'; Sankharé 48'	Report	Darbion 52'; Dingomé (yellow card) 81'	Stadium: Nouveau Stade de Bordeaux; Attendance: 19,002; Referee: Tony Chapron

8 September 2017 5	Lille	0–0	Bordeaux	Villeneuve-d'Ascq
19:00	Thiago Maia (yellow card) 15' (yellow-red card); Benzia (yellow card) 36'; Bissouma (yellow card) 82'	Report	Otávio (yellow card) 5'; Jovanović (yellow card) 44'; Kamano (yellow card) 63'; Vada (yellow card) 74'	Stadium: Stade Pierre-Mauroy; Attendance: 27,464; Referee: (France) François Letexier

15 September 2017 6	Toulouse	0–1	Bordeaux	Toulouse
20:45	Durmaz (yellow card) 10'; Diop (yellow card) 62'; Issiaga Sylla (yellow card) 86'	Report	Malcom 69'; Sabaly (yellow card) 85'	Stadium: Stadium Municipal; Attendance: 13,616; Referee: (France) Clément Turpin

23 September 2017 7	Bordeaux	3–1	Guingamp	Bordeaux
20:00	Toulalan (yellow card) 2'; Kamano 31'; Pellenard (yellow card) 35'; Malcom (yellow card) 42'; Lerager (yellow card) 44'; Mendy 75'; Jonathan Cafu 90+2'	Report	Ikoko (yellow card) 19'; Kerbrat (yellow card) 40'; Salibur 46'	Stadium: Nouveau Stade de Bordeaux; Attendance: 20,603; Referee: (France) Benoît Bastien

30 September 2017 8	Paris Saint-Germain	6–2	Bordeaux	Paris
17:00	Neymar 5', 40' (pen.); Cavani 12'; Meunier 21', (yellow card) 45+1'; Draxler 45'; Mbappé 58'	Report	Sankharé 31', (yellow card) 64'; Jovanović (yellow card) 39'; Malcom 90' (pen.)	Stadium: Parc des Princes; Attendance: 47,537; Referee: (France) François Letexier

15 October 2017 9	Bordeaux	1–1	Nantes	Bordeaux
15:00	Pellenard (yellow card) 24' de Préville (yellow card) 26'; Malcom 47'; Lewczuk (yellow card) 84'	Report	Krhin (yellow card) 19'; Nakoulma 45+2'; Thomasson (yellow card) 71'	Stadium: Nouveau Stade de Bordeaux; Attendance: 31,046; Referee: Karim Abed

21 October 2017 10	Amiens	1–0	Bordeaux	Amiens
20:00	Kakuta (yellow card) 32'; Ngosso 64'; Gurtner (yellow card) 73'; Ielsch (yellow card) 87'	Report	Lerager (yellow card) 37'	Stadium: Stade de la Licorne; Attendance: 12,297; Referee: (France) Sebastien Desiage

28 October 2017 11	Bordeaux	0–2	Monaco	Bordeaux
17:00	Vada (yellow card) 67'; Mendy (yellow card) 86'	Report	Baldé 57'; Lemar 65'	Stadium: Nouveau Stade de Bordeaux; Attendance: 28,831; Referee: (France) Antony Gautier

3 November 2017 12	Rennes	1–0	Bordeaux	Rennes
20:45	Toulalan 11' (o.g.); André (yellow card) 43'; Khazri (yellow card) 80'	Report	Otávio (yellow card) 41'; Kamano (yellow card) 47' de Préville (yellow card) 68'; Jovanović (yellow card) 70'; Sankharé (yellow card) 90'	Stadium: Roazhon Park; Attendance: 24,547; Referee: (France) Ruddy Buquet

19 November 2017 13	Bordeaux	1–1	Marseille	Bordeaux
21:00	de Préville 3', (yellow card) 22'; Lewczuk (yellow card) 65'; Kamano (yellow card) 67'; Lerager (yellow card) 73'	Report	Thauvin (yellow card) 45'; Lopez (yellow card) 54'; Sanson 90+4'	Stadium: Nouveau Stade de Bordeaux; Attendance: 37,356; Referee: Benoît Millot

25 November 2017 14	Caen	1–0	Bordeaux	Caen
20:00	Santini 23'; Genevois (yellow card) 62'; Mbengue (yellow card) 68'	Report	Sabaly (yellow card) 45'; Pellenard (yellow card) 83'; Mendy (yellow card) 88'; Jovanović (yellow card) 90+4'	Stadium: Stade Michel d'Ornano; Attendance: 15,275; Referee: Karim Abed

28 November 2017 15	Bordeaux	3–0	Saint-Étienne	Bordeaux
21:00	Mendy 5', 57'; Malcom 31'; Cafu (yellow card) 34'	Report	Pajot (yellow card) 38'; Janko (yellow card) 64'	Stadium: Nouveau Stade de Bordeaux; Attendance: 21,115; Referee: Mikael Lesage

1 December 2017 16	Dijon	3–2	Bordeaux	Dijon
20:45	Yambéré 34'; Chafik (yellow card) 51'; Jeannot 52', (yellow card) 57'; Saïd 87'	Report	Cafu 13'; Malcom 36'; Vada (yellow card) 61'; Plašil (yellow card) 90+2'	Stadium: Stade Gaston Gérard; Attendance: 10,631; Referee: Benoît Bastien

8 December 2017 17	Bordeaux	0–3	Strasbourg	Bordeaux
20:45	Otávio (yellow card) 11'; Toulalan (yellow card) 57'; Sankharé (yellow card) 59'	Report	Bahoken 2'; Seka (yellow card) 19'; Liénard 38'; Terrier 64'	Stadium: Nouveau Stade de Bordeaux; Attendance: 24,515; Referee: Jérôme Brisard

17 December 2017 18	Nice	1–0	Bordeaux	Nice
17:00	Balotelli 36', (yellow card) 42'	Report	Poundjé (yellow card) 80'; Jovanović (yellow card) 82'	Stadium: Allianz Riviera; Attendance: 22,831; Referee: Ruddy Buquet

20 December 2017 19	Bordeaux	0–2	Montpellier	Bordeaux
20:50	Pellenard (yellow card) 28'; Malcom (yellow card) 56'; Plašil (yellow card) 86'	Report	Sio (yellow card) 16'; Píriz (yellow card) 51'; Ikoné 71'; Skhiri (yellow card) 79'; Mbenza 90+2'	Stadium: Nouveau Stade de Bordeaux; Attendance: 16,429; Referee: Sébastien Desiage

13 January 2018 20	Troyes	0–1	Bordeaux	Troyes
20:00	Vizcarrondo (yellow card) 39'; Bellugou (yellow card) 59'; Traoré (yellow card) 65'; Deplagne (yellow card) 85'	Report	Laborde 15'	Stadium: Stade de l'Aube; Attendance: 10,822; Referee: Jérôme Brisard

16 January 2018 21	Bordeaux	0–2	Caen	Bordeaux
19:00	de Préville (yellow card) 2'; Toulalan (yellow card) 9'; Youssouf (yellow card) 85'; Baysse (red card) 89'	Report	Stavitski (yellow card) 24'; Bessat (yellow card) 31'; Guilbert (yellow card) 51'; Djiku (yellow card) 67'; Sankoh (yellow card) 83'; Santini 89' (pen.); Rodelin 90+4'	Stadium: Nouveau Stade de Bordeaux; Attendance: 14,368; Referee: Stéphane Jochem

20 January 2018 22	Nantes	0–1	Bordeaux	Nantes
17:00	Pallois (yellow card) 88'	Report	de Préville 26'; Laborde (yellow card) 36'; Lerager (yellow card) 80'	Stadium: Stade de la Beaujoire; Attendance: 26,076; Referee: Johan Hamel

28 January 2018 23	Bordeaux	3–1	Lyon	Bordeaux
17:00	De Préville 22', (yellow card) 61'; Malcom 27' (pen.); Otávio (yellow card) 36' (yellow-red card) 76'; Laborde 45+1' (pen.)	Report	Fekir (yellow card) 11'; Rafael (yellow card) 19'; Marcelo 44', (yellow card) 84'	Stadium: Nouveau Stade de Bordeaux; Attendance: 29,310; Referee: François Letexier

3 February 2018 24	Strasbourg	0–2	Bordeaux	Strasbourg
20:00	Grimm (yellow card) 25'	Report	Sankharé 3', (yellow card) 48'; Poundjé (yellow card) 5'; Pablo (yellow card) 30'; Laborde 53'; Braithwaite (yellow card) 90+1'	Stadium: Stade de la Meinau; Attendance: 24,662; Referee: Jérôme Brisard

10 February 2018 25	Bordeaux	3–2	Amiens	Bordeaux
20:00	Koundé 31'; Lerager 39'; Kamano 78'	Report	Monconduit (yellow card) 50'; Mendoza 79'; Kakuta 90'	Stadium: Nouveau Stade de Bordeaux; Attendance: 19,889; Referee: Benoît Bastien

18 February 2018 26	Marseille	1–0	Bordeaux	Marseille
21:00	Thauvin 35'; Zambo Anguissa (yellow card) 60'; Ocampos (yellow card) 80'	Report	Lerager (yellow card) 42'; Braithwaite (yellow card) 86'	Stadium: Stade Vélodrome; Attendance: 47,283; Referee: Mikael Lesage

25 February 2018 27	Bordeaux	0–0	Nice	Bordeaux
15:00	Pablo (yellow card) 78'; Vada (yellow card) 78'	Report	Coly (yellow card) 26'; Makengo (yellow card) 38'	Stadium: Nouveau Stade de Bordeaux; Attendance: 23,027; Referee: Frank Schneider

2 March 2018 28	Monaco	2–1	Bordeaux	Fontvieille, Monaco
20:45	Jovetić 45'; Lopes 69'	Report	Vada 32'; Youssouf (yellow card) 73'	Stadium: Stade Louis II; Attendance: 7,419; Referee: Ruddy Buquet

10 March 2018 29	Bordeaux	0–0	Caen	Bordeaux
20:00		Report		Stadium: Nouveau Stade de Bordeaux; Attendance: 17,194; Referee: Johan Hamel

17 March 2018 30	Bordeaux	0–2	Rennes	Bordeaux
17:00	Pablo (yellow card) 34' de Préville (yellow card) 71'	Report	André (yellow card) 45+1'; Sarr 49'; Gourcuff 86'	Stadium: Nouveau Stade de Bordeaux; Attendance: 32,626; Referee: Mikael Lesage

1 April 2018 31	Guingamp	2–1	Bordeaux	Guingamp
15:00	Grenier 55'; Diallo 59'; Didot (yellow card) 86'	Report	Poundjé (yellow card) 7'; Otávio (yellow card) 58'; Malcom 80'	Stadium: Stade de Roudourou; Attendance: 15,427; Referee: Sébastien Moreira

7 April 2018 32	Bordeaux	2–1	Lille	Bordeaux
20:00	Kamano 42', 45'; Poundjé (yellow card) 72'	Report	Mothiba 14'; Mendyl (yellow card) 24'; Thiago Mendes (yellow card) 61' (yellow-red card) 63'	Stadium: Nouveau Stade de Bordeaux; Attendance: 34,997; Referee: Thomas Leonard

15 April 2018 33	Montpellier	1–3	Bordeaux	Montpellier
15:00	Sio (yellow card) 43'; Cozza (yellow card) 48'; Lasne (yellow card) 56'; Skhiri 88'	Report	Koundé (yellow card) 3'; Braithwaite 9', (yellow card) 28'; Kamano 49'; Meïté 78'	Stadium: Stade de la Mosson; Attendance: 13,520; Referee: Karim Abed

22 April 2018 34	Bordeaux	0–1	Paris Saint-Germain	Bordeaux
21:00		Report	Lo Celso 71'; Kimpembe (yellow card) 89'	Stadium: Nouveau Stade de Bordeaux; Attendance: 41,290; Referee: Antony Gautier

28 April 2018 35	Bordeaux	3–1	Dijon	Bordeaux
20:00	Sankharé 25'; Lerager (yellow card) 57'; Kamano 72' (pen.); Rosier 80' (o.g.)	Report	Sliti 54' (pen.)	Stadium: Nouveau Stade de Bordeaux; Attendance: 22,584; Referee: Johan Hamel

6 May 2018 36	Saint-Étienne	1–3	Bordeaux	Saint-Étienne
15:00	Cabella 28' (pen.); Selnæs (yellow card) 45+2'; Ntep (yellow card) 88'	Report	Sankharé 30'; Koundé 36'; Lerager (yellow card) 68'; Lewczuk (yellow card) 85'; Costil (yellow card) 90'; Malcom 90+4'	Stadium: Stade Geoffroy-Guichard; Attendance: 33,741; Referee: Sébastien Moreira

12 May 2018 37	Bordeaux	4–2	Toulouse	Bordeaux
21:00	Poundjé (yellow card) 36'; Braithwaite 38', 49'; Lerager 73'; Malcom 78'	Report	Sangaré (yellow card) 24'; Sylla 29'; Somália (yellow card) 45+2'; Sanogo (yellow card) 66'; Diop 90'	Stadium: Nouveau Stade de Bordeaux; Attendance: 38,630; Referee: Ruddy Buquet

19 May 2018 38	Metz	0–4	Bordeaux	Metz
21:00	Niakhate (yellow card) 52'; Mandjeck (yellow card) 67'; Mollet (yellow card) 82'	Report	Braithwaite 11'; Malcom 17'; Kamano 44' de Préville 78'	Stadium: Stade Saint-Symphorien; Attendance: 12,400; Referee: Hakim Ben El Hadj

=== Coupe de France ===
7 January 2018 Last 64	US Granville	2–1 (a.e.t.)	Bordeaux	Granville
14:15	Ismael Gacé (yellow card) 5'; Jonathan Beaulieu (yellow card) 43'; Benyahya (yellow card) 52'; Sullivan Martinet 90+4'; Ladislas Douniama 103' (pen.); Melvyn Vieira (yellow card) 106'	Report	Sankharé 37', (yellow card) 60'; Malcom (yellow card) 68'; Sabaly (yellow card) 68' (yellow-red card); Carrique (red card) 102'; Plašil (red card) 109'	Stadium: Stade Louis Dior; Attendance: 3,000; Referee: (France) Thomas Léonard

=== Coupe de la Ligue ===
12 December 2017 Last 16	Toulouse	2–0	Bordeaux	Toulouse
18:45	Gradel 36' (pen.); Jullien (yellow card) 40'; Jean (yellow card) 47'; Toivonen 53'	Report	Poundjé (yellow card) 11' de Préville (yellow card) 44'	Stadium: Stadium Municipal; Attendance: 8,851; Referee: (France) Antony Gautier

=== UEFA Europa League ===
==== Third qualifying round ====
27 July 2017 First leg	Bordeaux (France)	2–1	(Hungary) Videoton	Bordeaux
20:30 CEST (UTC+2)	Sankharé 18', 33', (yellow card) 62'; Kamano (yellow card) 61'; Arambarri (yellow card) 77'	Report	Šćepović 23'; Hadžić (yellow card) 64'; Szolnoki (yellow card) 72'; Fejes (yellow card) 77'	Stadium: Nouveau Stade de Bordeaux; Attendance: 21,337; Referee: Bartosz Frankowski (Poland)

3 August 2017 Second leg	Videoton (Hungary)	1–0 (2a–2 agg.)	(France) Bordeaux	Felcsút, Hungary
13:00 CEST (UTC+2)	Szolnoki (yellow card) 8'; Fiola (yellow card) 23'; Stopira 45+5'; Varga (yellow card) 60' (yellow-red card) 69'; Juhász (yellow card) 82'; Suljić (yellow card) 83'; Lazović (yellow card) 89'	Report	Sabaly (yellow card) 41' (yellow-red card) 46'; Plašil (yellow card) 50'; Lewczuk (yellow card) 85'	Stadium: Pancho Aréna; Attendance: 3,537; Referee: Christian Dingert (Germany)

== Goalscorers ==
As of match played 7 June 2018

Place	Position	Nation	Number	Name	Ligue 1	Coupe de France	Coupe de la Ligue	UEFA Europa League	Total
1	FW	(Brazil)	7	Malcom	12	0	0	0	12
2	MF	(Senegal)	13	Younousse Sankharé	7	1	0	2	10
3	FW	(Guinea)	11	François Kamano	8	0	0	0	8
4	FW	(France)	15	Alexandre Mendy	4	0	0	0	4
4	FW	(France)	12	Nicolas de Préville	4	0	0	0	4
4	FW	(Denmark)	9	Martin Braithwaite	4	0	0	0	4
7	FW	(France)	24	Gaëtan Laborde	3	0	0	0	3
7	MF	(Denmark)	19	Lukas Lerager	3	0	0	0	3
9	MF	(Brazil)	22	Jonathan Cafu	2	0	0	0	2
9	DF	(France)	31	Jules Koundé	2	0	0	0	2
9	MF	(Argentina)	23	Valentin Vada	2	0	0	0	2
12	MF	(France)	10	Soualiho Meïté	1	0	0	0	1
				TOTALS	52	1	0	2	55
