= Vukašin Jovanović =

Vukašin Jovanović may refer to:

- Vukašin Jovanović (footballer, born 1996), Serbian football centre-back for FK Čukarički
- Vukašin Jovanović (footballer, born 2007), Serbian football goalkeeper for FK Partizan
