= Benoît Costil =

French footballer (born 1987)

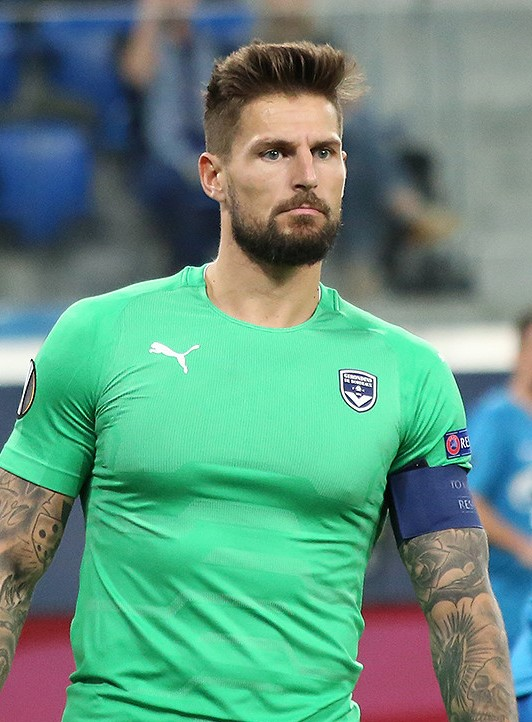
- Costil playing for Bordeaux in 2018

Personal information
- Full name: Benoît Guy Robert Costil
- Date of birth: 3 July 1987 (age 39)
- Place of birth: Caen, France
- Height: 1.88 m (6 ft 2 in)
- Position: Goalkeeper

Youth career
- 1993–1995: US Bretteville
- 1995–2005: Caen

Senior career*
Years	Team	Apps	(Gls)
2005–2009	Caen	9	(0)
2008–2009	→ Vannes (loan)	27	(0)
2009–2011	Sedan	76	(0)
2011–2017	Rennes	219	(0)
2017–2022	Bordeaux	164	(0)
2022–2023	Auxerre	19	(0)
2023	Lille	0	(0)
2023–2024	Salernitana	13	(0)
Total		527	(0)

International career
2008	France U21	2	(0)
2016	France	1	(0)
Medal record
Men's football
Representing France
UEFA Nations League
Winner	2021 Italy
UEFA European Championship
Runner-up	2016 France
UEFA European Under-17 Championship
Winner	2004 France
- * Club domestic league appearances and goals

Benoît Guy Robert Costil (born 3 July 1987) is a French former professional footballer who played as a goalkeeper.

Costil represented his nation at under-21 and senior level. He was part of France's squad at UEFA Euro 2016, in the same year as his senior international debut, and won the 2021 UEFA Nations League Finals.

== Club career ==
=== Early career ===
Born in Caen, Calvados, Costil started his career at Caen in Ligue 1 but only made a 10 performances for the club before being sent on loan in the 2008–09 season to Vannes in Ligue 2.

On 17 June 2009, Sedan signed Costil from Caen until June 2011. In two years at Sedan he made 76 appearances and was elected best goalkeeper of Ligue 2 for the 2010–11 season.

=== Rennes ===
On 14 June 2011, he signed a three-year contract for Rennes after his contract with Sedan expired. This transfer meant he returned to Ligue 1 for the first time since the handful of appearances he made at Caen at the beginning of his career.

=== Bordeaux ===
In 2017, Costil joined Bordeaux. In July 2019, he extended contract until 2022 and was named the team captain. However, following the signing of Laurent Koscielny, he was relegated to vice-captain. In 2022, Costil confirmed his departure from Bordeaux.

=== Auxerre ===
On 16 July 2022, newly promoted Ligue 1 team Auxerre announced the signing of Costil for free, on a one-year deal.

== International career ==
Costil was a France U-21 international having participated in the 2008 Toulon Tournament.

On 6 November 2014, Costil was called up to France manager Didier Deschamps' 23-man squad for friendly matches against Albania and Sweden.

On 12 May 2016, Costil was called up to France manager Didier Deschamps' 23-man squad for UEFA Euro 2016 as the third goalkeeper behind captain Hugo Lloris and Steve Mandanda. His team won the silver medal in the competition, after losing to Portugal 0–1 in final game, but he did not appear in the tournament.

He made his debut on 15 November against Ivory Coast, playing the whole game, also captaining his side in a 0–0 home draw. He kept the first clean sheet.

On 17 May 2018, he was included in a preliminary 35-man French squad for the 2018 FIFA World Cup in Russia alongside Anthony Martial, but did not make the final 23.

In September 2018, after Steve Mandanda got injured, Deschamps called Costil up to the national team for matches against Germany and the Netherlands in the UEFA Nations League.

In October 2021, he became UEFA Nations League champion with the national team.

== Career statistics ==
=== Club ===
Appearances and goals by club, season and competition
Club	Season	League			National cup		League cup		Europe		Total	
Club	Season	Division	Apps	Goals	Apps	Goals	Apps	Goals	Apps	Goals	Apps	Goals
Caen	2004–05	Ligue 1	0	0	—		0	0	—		0	0
Caen	2005–06	Ligue 2	4	0	2	0	2	0	—		8	0
Caen	2006–07	Ligue 2	0	0	3	0	1	0	—		4	0
Caen	2007–08	Ligue 1	5	0	0	0	2	0	—		7	0
Caen	Total		9	0	5	0	5	0	—		19	0
Vannes (loan)	2008–09	Ligue 2	27	0	0	0	0	0	—		27	0
Sedan	2009–10	Ligue 2	38	0	1	0	5	0	—		44	0
Sedan	2010–11	Ligue 2	38	0	3	0	1	0	—		42	0
Sedan	Total		76	0	4	0	6	0	—		86	0
Rennes	2011–12	Ligue 1	37	0	5	0	0	0	9	0	51	0
Rennes	2012–13	Ligue 1	37	0	0	0	5	0	—		42	0
Rennes	2013–14	Ligue 1	38	0	6	0	0	0	—		44	0
Rennes	2014–15	Ligue 1	38	0	3	0	3	0	—		44	0
Rennes	2015–16	Ligue 1	31	0	2	0	0	0	—		33	0
Rennes	2016–17	Ligue 1	38	0	2	0	1	0	—		41	0
Rennes	Total		219	0	18	0	9	0	9	0	255	0
Bordeaux	2017–18	Ligue 1	36	0	0	0	1	0	2	0	39	0
Bordeaux	2018–19	Ligue 1	37	0	1	0	1	0	12	0	51	0
Bordeaux	2019–20	Ligue 1	28	0	0	0	1	0	—		29	0
Bordeaux	2020–21	Ligue 1	38	0	0	0	—		—		38	0
Bordeaux	2021–22	Ligue 1	25	0	0	0	—		—		25	0
Bordeaux	Total		164	0	1	0	3	0	14	0	182	0
Auxerre	2022–23	Ligue 1	19	0	0	0	—		—		19	0
Lille	2022–23	Ligue 1	0	0	0	0	—		—		0	0
Salernitana	2023–24	Serie A	13	0	2	0	—		—		15	0
Career total			527	0	30	0	23	0	23	0	603	0

=== International ===
Appearances and goals by national team and year
National team	Year	Apps	Goals
France	2016	1	0
Total		1	0

== Honours ==
France

- UEFA Nations League: 2020–21
- UEFA European Championship runner-up: 2016
