= Samuel Kalu =

Nigerian footballer (born 1997)

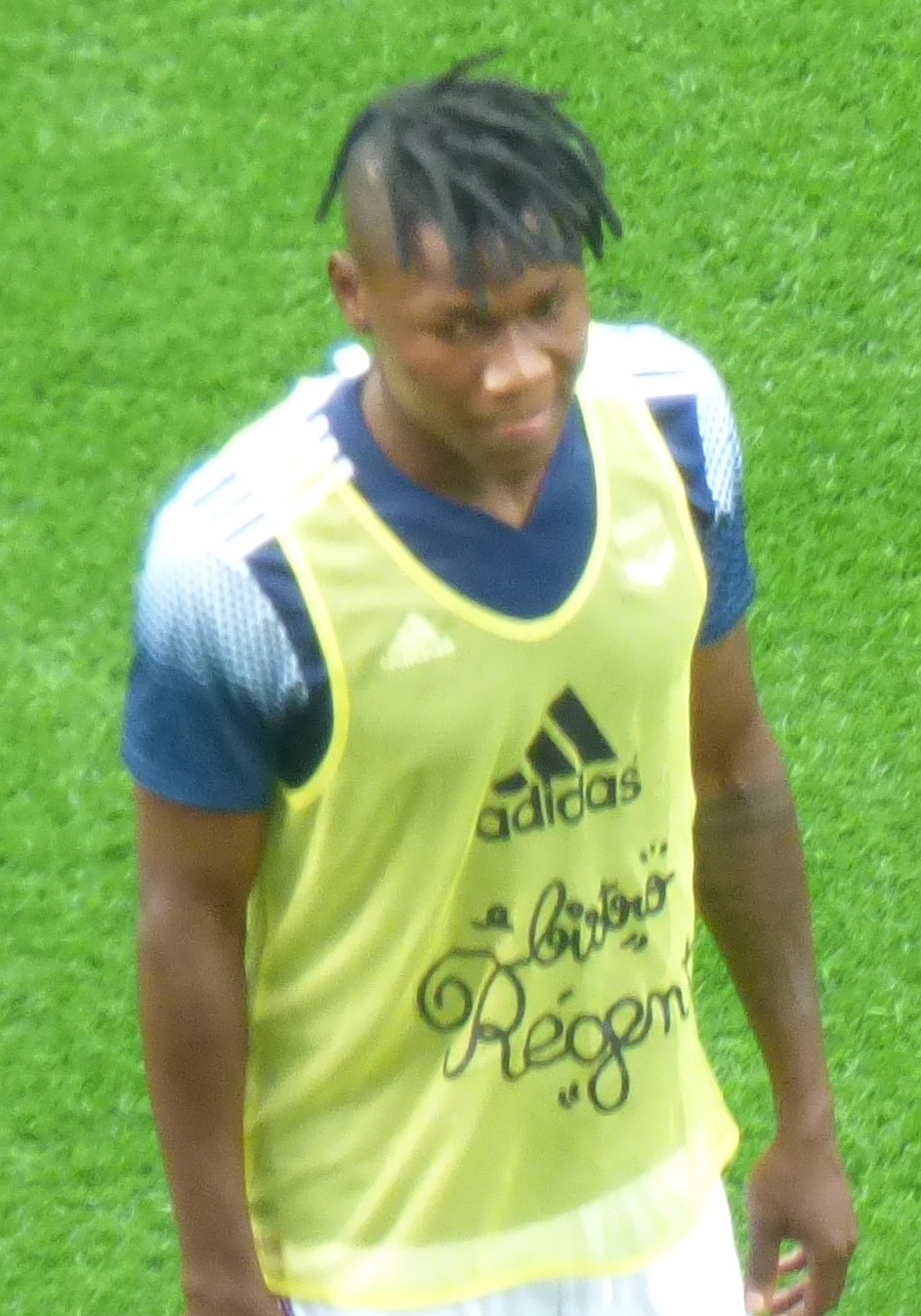
- Kalu with Bordeaux in 2020

Personal information
- Full name: Samuel Kalu Ojim
- Date of birth: 26 August 1997 (age 29)
- Place of birth: Aba, Abia State, Nigeria
- Height: 1.77 m (5 ft 10 in)
- Position: Winger

Team information
- Current team: Botev Plovdiv
- Number: 90

Youth career
- –2016: GBS Academy

Senior career*
Years	Team	Apps	(Gls)
2016–2017	AS Trenčín	32	(4)
2017–2018	Gent	48	(10)
2018–2022	Bordeaux	72	(9)
2022–2024	Watford	13	(0)
2023–2024	→ Lausanne-Sport (loan)	21	(3)
2025–	Botev Plovdiv	36	(6)

International career^{‡}
2018–	Nigeria	16	(2)
Medal record
Africa Cup of Nations
Third place	2019 Egypt
- * Club domestic league appearances and goals as of 31 October 2026 ‡ National team caps and goals as of 13 November 2019

Samuel Kalu Ojim (born 26 August 1997) is a Nigerian professional footballer who plays as winger for Bulgarian First League club Botev Plovdiv.

== Club career ==
Kalu started his football career at GBS Academy in Jos, Nigeria.

=== AS Trenčín ===
On 9 December 2015, Kalu agreed to sign a two-year contract with Slovak side AS Trenčín, a partner club with GBS Academy at the time. He made his professional debut for Trenčín against Slovan Bratislava on 27 February 2016.

=== Gent ===
On 4 January 2017, after his impressive displays in the Slovak League with Trenčín, Kalu was transferred to Belgium top division club KAA Gent.

=== Bordeaux ===
On 6 August 2018, Kalu signed for Ligue 1 side Bordeaux, signing a five-year contract. He was handed the number 10 jersey on arrival.

On 15 August 2021, Kalu collapsed in a game against Marseille. He was able to get up and walk off the pitch with his teammates’ help while holding an ice pack against his head. Eight minutes later, he was substituted off for Rémi Oudin.

=== Watford ===
On 26 January 2022, Kalu joined Premier League club Watford on a three-and-a-half-year deal until 2025.

=== FC Lausanne-Sport ===
On 7 September 2023, Kalu joined Swiss Super League club FC Lausanne-Sport on a season long loan from Watford.

=== FC Botev Plovdiv ===
In September 2025, Kalu joined Bulgarian First League club Botev Plovdiv after leaving Watford as a free agent. Following an impressive debut season, he signed a contract extension with the club until 2029 in July 2026, ending speculation over his future after attracting interest from several clubs.

== International career ==
On 13 October 2018, he scored his first international goal with the Nigeria senior national team against Libya. He scored the final goal in a 4–0 victory.

Kalu collapsed whilst participating in a team training session during the AFCON 2019 held in Egypt. Though rumours had it that he suffered a heart attack, this was later debunked as he collapsed as a result of severe dehydration. He was later released from the hospital to link up with the rest of the squad in Alexandria.

== Personal life ==
Kalu's mother was released on 5 March 2019, having been kidnapped six days previously.

== Career statistics ==
=== Club ===
As of match played 3 February 2024

Appearances and goals by club, season and competition
Club	Season	League			National cup		League cup		Other		Total	
Club	Season	Division	Apps	Goals	Apps	Goals	Apps	Goals	Apps	Goals	Apps	Goals
AS Trenčín	2015–16	Slovak Super Liga	13	3	4	1	—		—		17	4
AS Trenčín	2016–17	Slovak Super Liga	19	1	3	1	—		5 (Note: Four appearances in UEFA Champions League and one in UEFA Europa League)	1	27	3
AS Trenčín	Total		32	4	7	2	—		5	1	44	7
Gent	2016–17	Belgian First Division A	16	3	0	0	—		3 (Note: Appearances in UEFA Europa League)	1	19	4
Gent	2017–18	Belgian First Division A	32	7	2	0	—		2	0	36	7
Gent	Total		48	10	2	0	—		5	1	55	11
Bordeaux	2018–19	Ligue 1	21	3	1	0	3	1	7	0	32	4
Bordeaux	2019–20	Ligue 1	20	1	0	0	2	0	—		22	1
Bordeaux	2020–21	Ligue 1	20	4	0	0	0	0	—		20	4
Bordeaux	2021–22	Ligue 1	11	1	1	0	0	0	—		12	1
Bordeaux	Total		72	9	2	0	5	1	7	0	86	10
Watford	2021–22	Premier League	4	0	0	0	0	0	—		4	0
Watford	2022–23	Championship	9	0	0	0	0	0	—		9	0
Watford	Total		13	0	0	0	0	0	0	0	13	0
FC Lausanne-Sport	2023–24	Swiss Super League	15	3	0	0	0	0	—		15	3
FC Lausanne-Sport	Total		15	3	0	0	0	0	0	0	15	3
Career total			178	23	11	2	5	1	17	2	211	31

=== International ===
As of matches played on 13 November 2019

Appearances and goals by national team and year
National team	Year	Apps	Goals
Nigeria	2018	6	1
Nigeria	2019	7	1
Total		13	2

Scores and results list Nigeria's goal tally first, score column indicates score after each Kalu goal.

List of international goals scored by Samuel Kalu
No.	Date	Venue	Opponent	Score	Result	Competition
1	13 October 2018	Ahmadu Bello Stadium, Kaduna, Nigeria	Libya	4–0	4–0	2019 Africa Cup of Nations qualification
2	13 November 2019	Godswill Akpabio International Stadium, Uyo, Nigeria	Benin	2–1	2–1	2021 Africa Cup of Nations qualification
