= Youssouf Sabaly =

Footballer (born 1993)

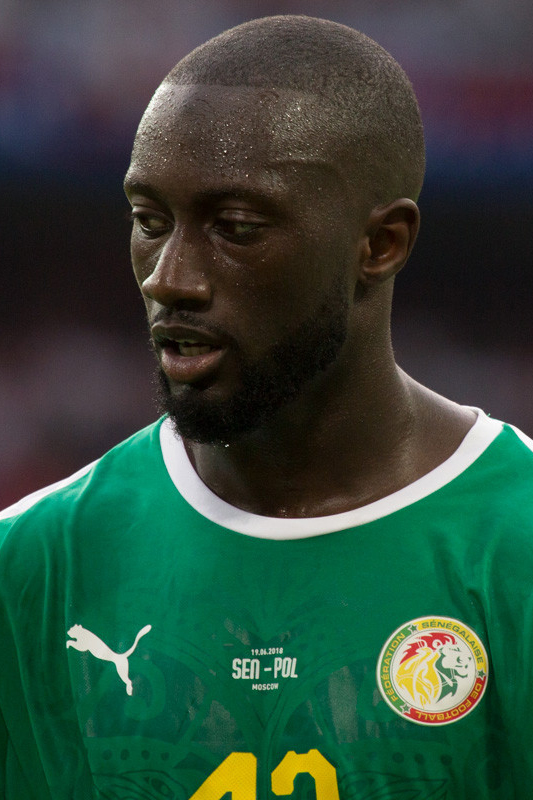
- Sabaly playing for Senegal at the 2018 FIFA World Cup

Personal information
- Full name: Youssouf Sabaly
- Date of birth: 5 March 1993 (age 33)
- Place of birth: Le Chesnay, France
- Height: 1.74 m (5 ft 9 in)
- Position: Right-back

Team information
- Current team: Al-Shamal SC
- Number: 20

Youth career
- 2001–2003: Cellois Sc
- 2003–2011: Paris Saint-Germain

Senior career*
Years	Team	Apps	(Gls)
2011–2013	Paris Saint-Germain II	46	(0)
2013–2017	Paris Saint-Germain	0	(0)
2013–2015	→ Evian (loan)	65	(0)
2015–2016	→ Nantes (loan)	28	(2)
2016–2017	→ Bordeaux (loan)	30	(0)
2017–2021	Bordeaux	103	(1)
2021–2025	Betis	67	(1)
2025–2026	Al-Duhail	10	(0)
2026–	Al-Shamal	0	(0)

International career
2009–2010	France U17	11	(0)
2010–2011	France U18	7	(1)
2011	France U19	2	(0)
2012–2013	France U20	7	(0)
2017–2024	Senegal	32	(1)
Medal record
Association football
Senegal
Africa Cup of Nations
Runner-up	2019 Egypt
France
FIFA U-20 World Cup
Winner	2013 Turkey
- * Club domestic league appearances and goals as of 05 September 2026

Youssouf Sabaly (born 5 March 1993) is a professional footballer who plays as a right-back for Al-Shamal. Born in France, he represented Senegal at international level.

== Club career ==
Sabaly made his Ligue 1 debut with Evian in the opening game of the 2013–14 season against Sochaux-Montbéliard, playing the full game, which ended in a 1–1 draw.

In August 2016, he agreed to a contract extension until 2020, before joining Bordeaux on a season-long loan.

On 7 June 2021, Sabaly signed for La Liga club Real Betis on a free transfer, effective from 1 July.

== International career ==
Sabaly was born in France to Senegalese parents. He has represented France at various youth levels, and was a member of the victorious squad at the 2013 FIFA U-20 World Cup.

In 2017, Sabaly received his first call-up from Senegal. He made his debut in a 2–0 2018 FIFA World Cup qualification win over South Africa on 10 November 2017.

In May 2018, he was named in Senegal's 23-man squad for the 2018 FIFA World Cup in Russia.

Subsequently, Sabaly was called up to the 2019 Africa Cup of Nations, where Senegal finished as runners-up after a 1–0 defeat to Algeria in the final; Sabaly would end up being elected into the team of the tournament.

Salaby played in all four of Senegal's matches at the 2022 FIFA World Cup as the nation reached the round of 16 for the first time since its debut in 2002.

In December 2023, he was named in Senegal's squad for the postponed 2023 Africa Cup of Nations held in the Ivory Coast.

== Career statistics ==
=== Club ===
As of match played 28 May 2025

Appearances and goals by club, season and competition
Club	Season	League			National cup		League cup		Continental		Other		Total	
Club	Season	Division	Apps	Goals	Apps	Goals	Apps	Goals	Apps	Goals	Apps	Goals	Apps	Goals
Paris Saint-Germain II	2010–11	CFA	6	0	—		—		—		—		6	0
Paris Saint-Germain II	2011–12	CFA	15	0	—		—		—		—		15	0
Paris Saint-Germain II	2012–13	CFA	25	0	—		—		—		—		25	0
Paris Saint-Germain II	Total		46	0	0	0	0	0	0	0	0	0	46	0
Evian (loan)	2013–14	Ligue 1	36	0	0	0	3	0	—		—		39	0
Evian (loan)	2014–15	Ligue 1	29	0	2	0	1	0	—		—		32	0
Evian (loan)	Total		65	0	2	0	4	0	0	0	0	0	71	0
Nantes (loan)	2015–16	Ligue 1	28	2	1	0	1	0	—		—		30	2
Bordeaux (loan)	2016–17	Ligue 1	30	0	1	0	2	0	—		—		33	0
Bordeaux	2017–18	Ligue 1	35	0	1	0	1	0	2 (Note: Appearances in UEFA Europa League)	0	—		39	0
Bordeaux	2018–19	Ligue 1	23	0	1	0	3	0	4	0	—		31	0
Bordeaux	2019–20	Ligue 1	12	0	1	0	1	0	—		—		14	0
Bordeaux	2020–21	Ligue 1	33	1	0	0	0	0	—		—		33	1
Bordeaux	Total		133	1	4	0	7	0	6	0	0	0	150	1
Real Betis	2021–22	La Liga	10	0	4	0	—		3	0	—		17	0
Real Betis	2022–23	La Liga	23	1	1	1	—		3	0	1 (Note: Appearance in Supercopa de España)	0	28	2
Real Betis	2023–24	La Liga	12	0	0	0	—		0	0	—		12	0
Real Betis	2024–25	La Liga	22	0	4	0	—		8 (Note: Appearances in UEFA Conference League)	0	—		34	0
Real Betis	Total		67	1	9	1	0	0	14	0	1	0	91	2
Career total			339	4	16	1	12	0	20	0	1	0	388	5

=== International ===
As of match played 12 September 2023

Appearances and goals by national team and year
National team	Year	Apps	Goals
Senegal	2017	2	0
Senegal	2018	8	0
Senegal	2019	8	0
Senegal	2020	3	0
Senegal	2022	7	0
Senegal	2023	4	1
Total		32	1

Senegal score listed first, score column indicates score after each Sabaly goal.

List of international goals scored by Youssouf Sabaly
No.	Date	Venue	Opponent	Score	Result	Competition
1	24 March 2023	Diamniadio Olympic Stadium, Dakar, Senegal	Mozambique	1–0	5–1	2023 Africa Cup of Nations qualification

== Honours ==
Paris Saint-Germain U19

- Championnat National U19: 2010–11

Betis

- Copa del Rey: 2021–22
- UEFA Conference League runner-up: 2024–25

Individual

- UEFA European Under-17 Championship Team of the Tournament: 2010
- Africa Cup of Nations Team of the Tournament: 2019
- UEFA Conference League Team of the Season: 2024–25
