= Pablo (footballer, born June 1991) =

Brazilian footballer (born 1991)

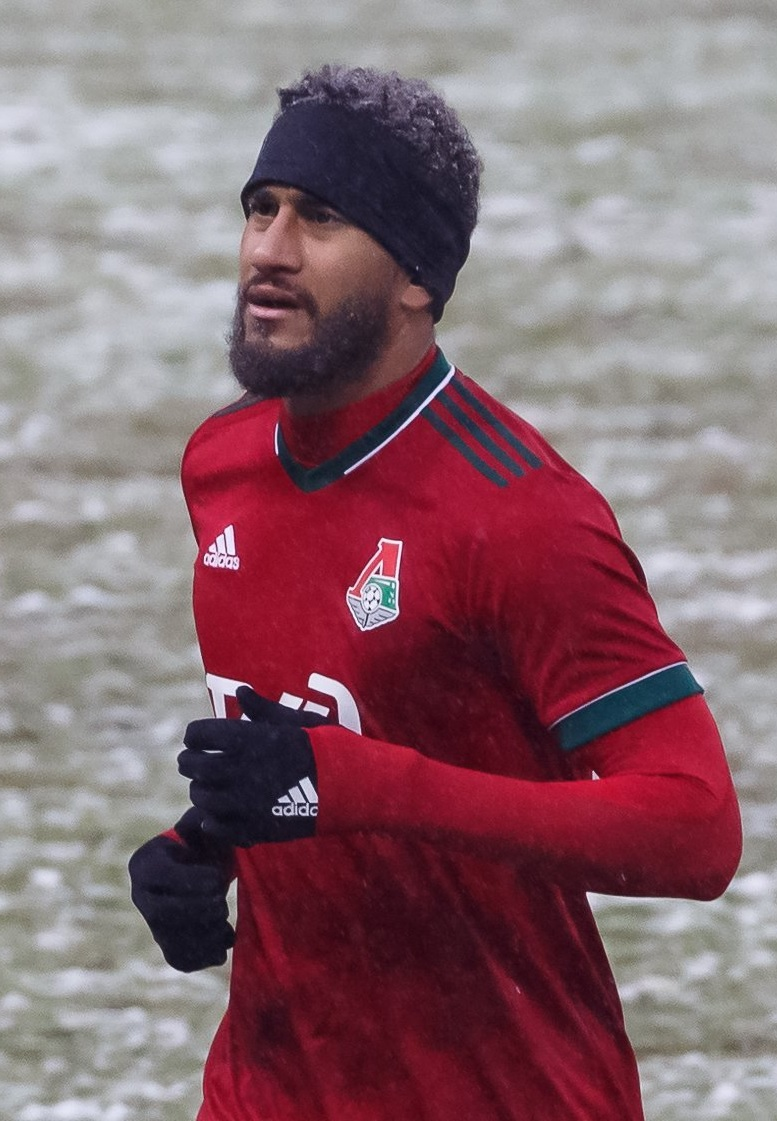
- Pablo with Lokomotiv Moscow in 2021

Personal information
- Full name: Pablo Nascimento Castro
- Date of birth: 21 June 1991 (age 35)
- Place of birth: São Luís, Brazil
- Height: 1.88 m (6 ft 2 in)
- Position: Centre-back

Team information
- Current team: São Bernardo

Youth career
- Ceará

Senior career*
Years	Team	Apps	(Gls)
2009–2011	Ceará	33	(3)
2010	→ Quixadá (loan)	12	(1)
2011	→ Tiradentes (loan)	30	(3)
2012	Grêmio	30	(3)
2013–2014	Avaí	35	(5)
2015	Ponte Preta	18	(1)
2015–2021	Bordeaux	94	(7)
2017	→ Corinthians (loan)	24	(0)
2021	Lokomotiv Moscow	23	(1)
2022–2025	Flamengo	41	(0)
2024	→ Botafogo (loan)	1	(0)
2026–	São Bernardo	0	(0)

International career
2018	Brazil	2	(0)
- * Club domestic league appearances and goals as of 18 November 2026

Pablo Nascimento Castro (born 21 June 1991), simply known as Pablo, is Brazilian professional footballer who plays as a central defender for São Bernardo. He made two appearances for the Brazil national team in 2018.

== Club career ==
=== Brazil ===
Born in São Luís, Maranhão, Pablo graduated from the youth setup of Ceará and made his senior debut in 2010, in Série A. On 7 January 2012, he joined Grêmio for the upcoming season. After appearing rarely for the side, he left the club on 13 December.

On 9 January 2013, Pablo moved to Série B club Avaí. On 29 November, he scored his first Série B goal in a 1–0 victory over Boa. He played regularly during the 2014 season, as fellow league club Flamengo expressing their desire to secure his services

On 8 January 2015, Pablo returned to the top flight and joined Ponte Preta. On 9 August, he scored his first goal for the club in a 1–0 win against Flamengo.

=== Bordeaux, and Corinthians loan ===
On 31 August 2015, Pablo moved abroad and joined French Ligue 1 club Bordeaux on a four-year contract. He made his Europa League debut on 17 September against Liverpool; and was nutmegged by Adam Lallana in the 1–1 draw. On 26 September, he scored his first goal for the club in a 3–1 victory against Lyon.

On 1 January 2017, Pablo was loaned out to Brazilian club Corinthians. He played 51 times during the season, with the side winning the Campeonato Paulista and Série A.

=== Lokomotiv Moscow ===
On 15 January 2021, Pablo signed a three-and-a-half-year deal with Russian Premier League side Lokomotiv Moscow.

=== Flamengo ===
On 14 March 2022, Lokomotiv Moscow announced the transfer of Pablo to Flamengo.

=== Botafogo ===
On 2 February 2024, he was announced as a new reinforcement for Botafogo until the end of 2024. As soon as he arrived at Botafogo, Pablo felt pain in his thigh and has been absent from the team since then. The defender has not even been listed by Alvinegro yet.

On 17 April 2024, two months after being signed by Botafogo, Pablo was finally announced by the club in a press conference at the Nilton Santos Stadium.

On 21 April Pablo finally debuted for Botafogo in the 5–1 defeat of Juventude, at the Nilton Santos Stadium, in the third round of the Brazilian Championship. The defender, however, felt his thigh again and left the game. Pablo only spent 20 minutes on the field.

== International career ==
On 12 October 2018, Pablo made his international debut for the Brazil national team playing the full 90 minutes of a 2–0 victory against Saudi Arabia in a friendly match.

== Career statistics ==
As of 12 December 2021

Appearances and goals by club, season and competition
Club	Season	League			Cup		Continental		Other		Total	
Club	Season	Division	Apps	Goals	Apps	Goals	Apps	Goals	Apps	Goals	Apps	Goals
Quixadá (loan)	2010	Cearense	–		–		–		1 (Note: Appearances in Campeonato Cearense)	0	1	0
Ceará	2010	Série A	3	0	–		–		–		3	0
Ceará	2011	Série A	–		–		–		3	0	3	0
Ceará	Total		3	0	0	0	0	0	3	0	6	0
Tiradentes (loan)	2011	Cearense	–		–		–		3	0	3	0
Grêmio	2012	Série A	0	0	0	0	–		1 (Note: Appearances in Campeonato Gaúcho)	0	1	0
Avaí	2013	Série B	3	1	4	0	–		15 (Note: Appearances in Campeonato Catarinense)	2	22	3
Avaí	2014	Série B	32	4	5	0	–		8	0	45	4
Avaí	Total		35	5	9	0	0	0	23	2	67	7
Ponte Preta	2015	Série A	18	1	3	0	1 (Note: Appearances in Copa Sudamericana)	0	14 (Note: Appearances in Campeonato Paulista)	0	36	1
Bordeaux	2015–16	Ligue 1	16	1	1	0	1 (Note: Appearances in UEFA Europa League)	0	–		18	1
Bordeaux	2016–17	Ligue 1	0	0	0	0	–		–		0	0
Bordeaux	2017–18	Ligue 1	15	0	0	0	–		–		15	0
Bordeaux	2018–19	Ligue 1	25	1	0	0	12	0	2 (Note: Appearances in Coupe de la Ligue)	0	39	1
Bordeaux	2019–20	Ligue 1	25	4	1	0	–		2	0	28	4
Bordeaux	2020–21	Ligue 1	13	1	0	0	–		–		13	1
Bordeaux	Total		94	7	2	0	13	0	4	0	113	7
Bordeaux II	2016–17	CFA 2	2	0	–		–		–		2	0
Corinthians (loan)	2017	Série A	24	0	6	0	4	0	16	2	50	2
Lokomotiv Moscow	2020–21	RPL	10	0	4	1	–		–		14	1
Lokomotiv Moscow	2021–22	RPL	13	1	0	0	3	0	1 (Note: Appearance in the Russian Super Cup)	0	17	1
Lokomotiv Moscow	Total		23	1	4	1	3	0	1	0	31	2
Career total			199	14	24	1	21	0	66	4	310	19

== Honours ==
Corinthians

- Campeonato Brasileiro Série A: 2017
- Campeonato Paulista: 2017

Lokomotiv Moscow

- Russian Cup: 2020–21

Flamengo

- Copa do Brasil: 2022
- Copa Libertadores: 2022
- Campeonato Carioca: 2025

Botafogo

- Copa Libertadores: 2024
- Campeonato Brasileiro Série A: 2024

Individual

- Campeonato Paulista Team of the Year: 2017
- Best Centre-back in Brazil: 2017
