= Otávio (footballer, born 1994) =

Brazilian footballer

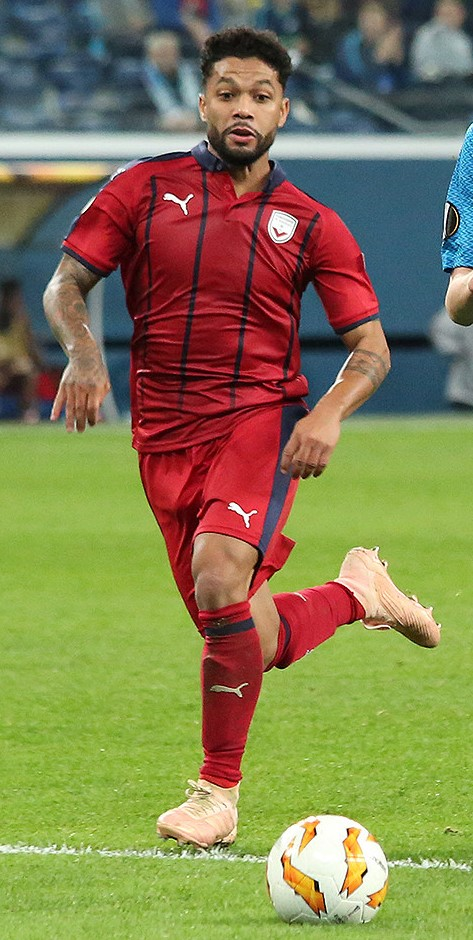
- Otávio with Bordeaux in 2018

Personal information
- Full name: Otávio Henrique Passos Santos
- Date of birth: 4 May 1994 (age 32)
- Place of birth: Maceió, Brazil
- Height: 1.73 m (5 ft 8 in)
- Position: Defensive midfielder

Team information
- Current team: Fluminense
- Number: 94

Youth career
- –2008: CRB
- 2009–2013: Atlético Paranaense

Senior career*
Years	Team	Apps	(Gls)
2014–2017	Atlético Paranaense	133	(2)
2017–2022	Bordeaux	113	(3)
2022	→ Atlético Mineiro (loan)	18	(0)
2022–2025	Atlético Mineiro	85	(0)
2025–	Fluminense	19	(0)
- * Club domestic league appearances and goals as of 6 April 2026

Otávio Henrique Passos Santos (born 4 May 1994), simply known as Otávio, is a Brazilian professional footballer who plays as a defensive midfielder for Campeonato Brasileiro Série A club Fluminense.

== Career ==
=== Atlético Paranaense ===
Born in Maceió, Alagoas, Otávio joined Atlético Paranaense's youth setup in 2009, aged 14, after starting it out at CRB. He was promoted to the main squad in 2014, and appeared in all matches of the year's Campeonato Paranaense.

Otávio made his Série A debut on 20 April 2014, coming on as a late substitute in a 1–0 home win against Grêmio. He scored his first goal in the category on 12 June 2016, netting the equalizer in a 2–1 away win against São Paulo.

=== Bordeaux ===
On 8 August 2017, Otávio signed for Ligue 1 side Bordeaux from Athletico Paranaense for a €5.2 million transfer fee. He was given the number 5 shirt by the club. He played a total of 29 matches in his first season.

=== Atlético Mineiro ===
On 4 February 2022, Otávio joined Atlético Mineiro on loan until 30 June, with an agreement to make the deal permanent at the end of the loan. He signed a four-year contract with the club.

=== Fluminense ===
On 19 February 2025, Otávio joined Fluminense on a deal running until December 2027.

== Career statistics ==
As of 14 February 2025

Appearances and goals by club, season and competition
Club	Season	League			State league		National cup		League cup		Continental		Other		Total	
Club	Season	Division	Apps	Goals	Apps	Goals	Apps	Goals	Apps	Goals	Apps	Goals	Apps	Goals	Apps	Goals
Atlético Paranaense	2014	Série A	17	0	14 (Note: Appearance(s) in Campeonato Paranaense)	0	1	0	—		—		—		32	0
Atlético Paranaense	2015	Série A	32	0	3	0	0	0	—		6 (Note: Appearance(s) in Copa Sudamericana)	0	—		41	0
Atlético Paranaense	2016	Série A	35	1	15	0	6	0	—		—		5 (Note: Appearance(s) Primeira Liga)	1	61	2
Atlético Paranaense	2017	Série A	13	1	4	0	3	0	—		10 (Note: Appearance(s) in Copa Libertadores)	0	—		30	1
Atlético Paranaense	Total		97	2	36	0	10	0	—		16	0	5	1	164	3
Bordeaux	2017–18	Ligue 1	21	0	—		0	0	0	0	0	0	—		21	0
Bordeaux	2018–19	Ligue 1	33	0	—		0	0	3 (Note: Appearance(s) in Coupe de la Ligue)	0	7 (Note: Appearance(s) in UEFA Europa League)	0	—		43	0
Bordeaux	2019–20	Ligue 1	25	2	—		2	0	1	0	—		—		28	2
Bordeaux	2020–21	Ligue 1	18	1	—		0	0	—		—		—		18	1
Bordeaux	2021–22	Ligue 1	16	0	—		1	0	—		—		—		17	0
Bordeaux	Total		113	3	—		3	0	4	0	7	0	—		127	3
Atlético Mineiro	2022	Série A	24	0	6 (Note: Appearance(s) in Campeonato Mineiro)	0	4	0	—		7	0	0	0	41	0
Atlético Mineiro	2023	Série A	27	0	11	0	1	0	—		8	0	—		47	0
Atlético Mineiro	2024	Série A	25	0	7	0	9	0	—		9	0	—		50	0
Atlético Mineiro	2025	Série A	—		3	0	0	0	—		—		—		3	0
Atlético Mineiro	Total		76	0	27	0	14	0	—		24	0	0	0	141	0
Career total			286	5	63	0	27	0	4	0	47	0	5	1	432	6

== Honours ==
Atlético Paranaense

- Campeonato Paranaense: 2016

Atlético Mineiro

- Supercopa do Brasil: 2022
- Campeonato Mineiro: 2022, 2023, 2024
