= Gaëtan Laborde =

French footballer (born 1994)

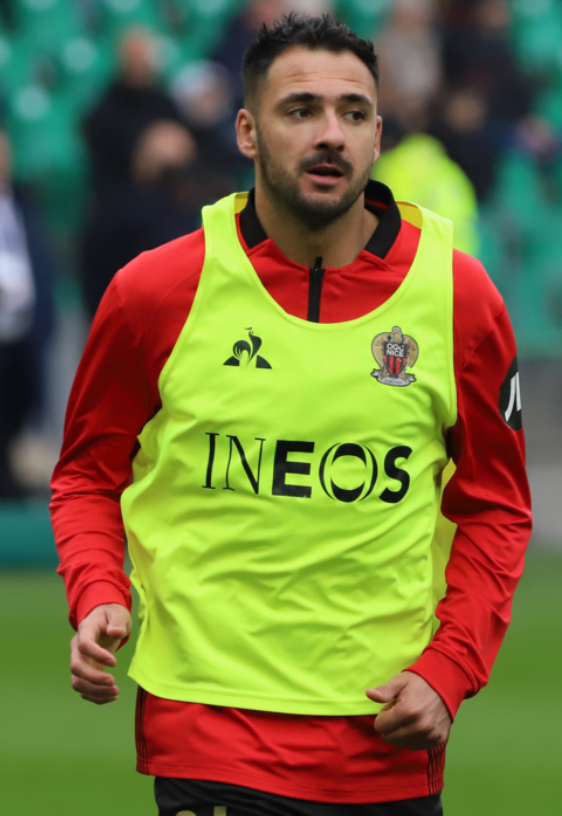
- Laborde with Nice in 2025

Personal information
- Date of birth: 3 May 1994 (age 32)
- Place of birth: Mont-de-Marsan, France
- Height: 1.81 m (5 ft 11 in)
- Position: Forward

Team information
- Current team: Al-Diriyah
- Number: 9

Youth career
- 2000–2008: Stade Montois
- 2008–2011: Bordeaux

Senior career*
| Years | Team | Apps | (Gls) |
| 2011–2015 | Bordeaux II | 50 | (8) |
| 2013–2018 | Bordeaux | 58 | (9) |
| 2013–2014 | → Red Star (loan) | 24 | (14) |
| 2014–2015 | → Brest (loan) | 26 | (2) |
| 2016 | → Clermont (loan) | 18 | (8) |
| 2018–2021 | Montpellier | 106 | (36) |
| 2021–2022 | Rennes | 38 | (14) |
| 2022–2025 | Nice | 95 | (29) |
| 2025– | Al-Diriyah | 37 | (28) |

International career
| 2011 | France U17 | 10 | (3) |
| 2011 | France U18 | 5 | (4) |
| 2013 | France U19 | 1 | (1) |
| 2013–2014 | France U20 | 5 | (2) |
- * Club domestic league appearances and goals as of 25 August 2026

Gaëtan Laborde (born 3 May 1994) is a French professional footballer who plays as a forward for Saudi Pro League club Al-Diriyah. He played for the France national youth teams up to France U20 level.

== Club career ==
Laborde started his career at Stade Montois before joining Bordeaux in 2008. He won the 2013 Coupe Gambardella with Bordeaux, scoring the winning goal in the final against Sedan.

On 16 August 2018, Laborde joined Ligue 1 rivals Montpellier HSC on a four-year contract. The transfer fee paid to Bordeaux was reported as €3 million plus bonuses. A day later, Bordeaux's manager Gus Poyet was suspended by his club following an outburst in which he criticised the sale of Laborde.

After 3 seasons at Montpellier HSC in which he scored 39 goals across 118 games, Laborde signed for Ligue 1 club Stade Rennais F.C. on 31 August 2021. His only season at Rennes was moderately successful, in which he scored 19 goals in 47 matches across all competitions.

On 1 September 2022, Nice signed Laborde from Rennes for €15 million on a contract until 30 June 2026. He scored his first goal for the club in a 2–1 loss to Paris Saint-Germain on 2 October 2022.

== Career statistics ==
As of match played 17 May 2025

Appearances and goals by club, season and competition
| Club | Season | League | | | National cup (Note: Includes Coupe de France) | | League cup (Note: Includes Coupe de la Ligue) | | Continental | | Total | |
| Club | Season | Division | Apps | Goals | Apps | Goals | Apps | Goals | Apps | Goals | Apps | Goals |
|---|---|---|---|---|---|---|---|---|---|---|---|---|
| Bordeaux B | 2011–12 | CFA | 17 | 0 | — | | — | | — | | 17 | 0 |
| Bordeaux B | 2012–13 | CFA | 23 | 7 | — | | — | | — | | 23 | 7 |
| Bordeaux B | 2015–16 | CFA | 10 | 1 | — | | — | | — | | 10 | 1 |
| Bordeaux B | Total | | 50 | 8 | — | | — | | — | | 50 | 8 |
| Bordeaux | 2015–16 | Ligue 1 | 1 | 0 | 0 | 0 | 1 | 0 | 1 (Note: Appearance(s) in UEFA Europa League) | 1 | 3 | 1 |
| Bordeaux | 2016–17 | Ligue 1 | 36 | 6 | 4 | 3 | 2 | 4 | — | | 42 | 13 |
| Bordeaux | 2017–18 | Ligue 1 | 20 | 3 | 0 | 0 | 0 | 0 | 2 | 0 | 22 | 3 |
| Bordeaux | 2018–19 | Ligue 1 | 1 | 0 | 0 | 0 | 0 | 0 | 3 | 2 | 4 | 2 |
| Bordeaux | Total | | 58 | 9 | 4 | 3 | 3 | 4 | 6 | 3 | 71 | 19 |
| Red Star (loan) | 2013–14 | Championnat National | 24 | 14 | 0 | 0 | 0 | 0 | — | | 24 | 14 |
| Brest (loan) | 2014–15 | Ligue 2 | 26 | 2 | 3 | 2 | 1 | 0 | — | | 30 | 4 |
| Clermont (loan) | 2015–16 | Ligue 2 | 18 | 8 | 0 | 0 | 0 | 0 | — | | 18 | 8 |
| Montpellier | 2018–19 | Ligue 1 | 36 | 11 | 1 | 0 | 1 | 0 | — | | 38 | 11 |
| Montpellier | 2019–20 | Ligue 1 | 28 | 6 | 3 | 1 | 2 | 0 | — | | 33 | 7 |
| Montpellier | 2020–21 | Ligue 1 | 38 | 16 | 5 | 2 | — | | — | | 43 | 18 |
| Montpellier | 2021–22 | Ligue 1 | 4 | 3 | 0 | 0 | — | | — | | 4 | 3 |
| Montpellier | Total | | 106 | 36 | 9 | 3 | 3 | 0 | — | | 118 | 39 |
| Rennes | 2021–22 | Ligue 1 | 34 | 12 | 2 | 0 | — | | 7 (Note: Appearance(s) in UEFA Europa Conference League) | 5 | 43 | 17 |
| Rennes | 2022–23 | Ligue 1 | 4 | 2 | — | | — | | — | | 4 | 2 |
| Rennes | Total | | 38 | 14 | 2 | 0 | — | | 7 | 5 | 47 | 19 |
| Nice | 2022–23 | Ligue 1 | 33 | 13 | 1 | 0 | — | | 10 | 3 | 44 | 16 |
| Nice | 2023–24 | Ligue 1 | 34 | 5 | 4 | 1 | — | | 0 | 0 | 38 | 6 |
| Nice | 2024–25 | Ligue 1 | 28 | 11 | 3 | 0 | — | | 5 | 0 | 36 | 11 |
| Nice | Total | | 95 | 29 | 8 | 1 | — | | 15 | 3 | 118 | 33 |
| Career total | | | 415 | 120 | 26 | 9 | 7 | 4 | 28 | 11 | 476 | 144 |

== Honours ==
Bordeaux

- Coupe Gambardella: 2013

Individual

- UNFP Ligue 1 Player of the Month: November 2021
