= Younousse Sankharé =

Senegalese footballer (born 1989)

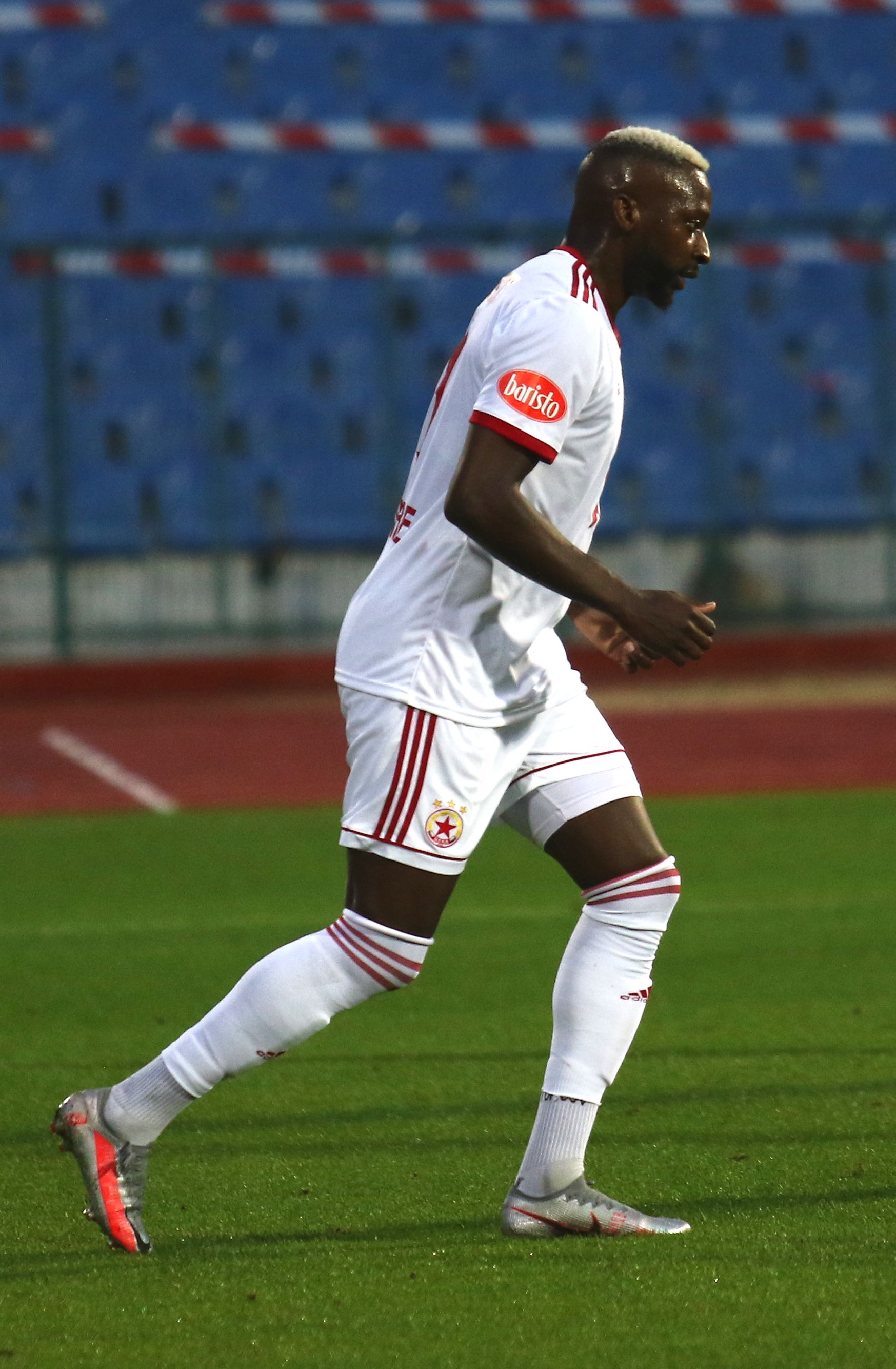
- Sankharé in 2020

Personal information
- Date of birth: 10 September 1989 (age 37)
- Place of birth: Sarcelles, France
- Height: 1.89 m (6 ft 2 in)
- Position: Midfielder

Team information
- Current team: FC 93

Youth career
- 1998–2001: AS Pierrefitte
- 2001–2007: Paris Saint-Germain

Senior career*
| Years | Team | Apps | (Gls) |
| 2007–2011 | Paris Saint-Germain | 33 | (1) |
| 2007–2011 | Paris Saint-Germain II | 3 | (0) |
| 2009 | → Reims (loan) | 17 | (0) |
| 2010–2011 | → Dijon (loan) | 27 | (6) |
| 2011–2013 | Dijon | 40 | (4) |
| 2013 | → Valenciennes (loan) | 13 | (0) |
| 2013 | → Valenciennes II (loan) | 1 | (0) |
| 2013–2016 | Guingamp | 98 | (9) |
| 2016–2017 | Lille | 21 | (2) |
| 2017–2019 | Bordeaux | 67 | (12) |
| 2020–2021 | CSKA Sofia | 12 | (3) |
| 2021 | Panathinaikos | 10 | (3) |
| 2021–2022 | Giresunspor | 8 | (0) |
| 2024– | FC 93 | 0 | (0) |

International career^{‡}
| 2008–2010 | France U21 | 16 | (3) |
| 2015–2017 | Senegal | 7 | (1) |
- * Club domestic league appearances and goals as of 18:33, 6 December 2021 (UTC) ‡ National team caps and goals as of 09:21, 3 June 2019 (UTC)

Younousse Sankharé (born 10 September 1989) is a Senegalese professional footballer who plays as a midfielder for French Championnat National 1 club FC 93. Born in France, he is a former Senegal international.

== Club career ==
Sankharé grew up in the northern suburbs of Paris in Val-d'Oise and joined his hometown club in 2001 arriving at the Camp des Loges as a youth player. After spending nearly six years in the club's youth system and the reserves, Younousse signed his first professional contract, in June 2007, agreeing to a three-year deal.

Younousse participated in the club's pre-season earning appearances in the 2007 edition of the Emirates Cup where Paris Saint-Germain finished second. He made his league debut on 6 October 2007 in a match against Rennes appearing as a substitute in a 3–1 defeat. He earned consecutive starts the following match days playing the full 90 minutes in both a 0–0 draw against Valenciennes and a 3–2 loss to Lyon. After those appearances, he regularly appeared as a substitute throughout the league season, but made impressive starts in the 2007–08 edition of the Coupe de France. In the Round of 16, he assisted on the opening goal scored by Loris Arnaud in a 2–1 victory over SC Bastia. He also played the full 90 minutes in 1–0 victories over amateur side Carquefou and Amiens SC.

The next season, Younousse's play was limited appearing in only two league matches. This was primarily due to the club's impressive start in league play, where they reached as high as 2nd position. He did make four appearances in the UEFA Cup earning starts against Turkish club Kayserispor, German club Schalke 04, and Spanish club Racing Santander.

Due to the club's positive form in league play and also playing well in Europe, on 26 January 2009, Sankharé was sent on loan by manager Paul Le Guen to Ligue 2 club Stade de Reims in order to increase the player's playing time. He made his debut just four days later playing 90 minutes in a 0–0 draw with Guingamp. He appeared in every following league match scoring no goals gaining experience in the process, despite Reims suffering relegation to the third-tier National. He returned to Paris on 1 July. He subsequently had spells with Dijon, Valenciennes and Guingamp.

On 26 July 2016, Sankharé joined fellow Ligue 1 side Lille on a four-year deal. However, after six months and twenty-three appearances in all competitions for Lille, Sankharé left to join Bordeaux on 30 January 2017.

For Les Girondins stayed three seasons playing for 67 games scoring 12 goals with his second season in the team to be his career highlight been the most scoring productive as he scored 7 goals in 29 games in Ligue 1 Conforama. He eventually left Bordeaux on 20 November 19 with his team terminating his contract.

On 21 June and after being without a club for six months Sankharé joins Bulgarian Group A champions CSKA Sofia. For Armeytsite he played for 12 league games while scoring 3 goals, he also started in all 10 games for his team's European campaign being one the key players.

Sankharé's career in the Bulgarian capital was brief as Greek club Panathinaikos showed interest and therefore signed him on 31 January 2021, the last day of winter transfer window. He scored the winning goal in his Greek Super League debut for "Trifili" against Atromitos coming from the bench in the 61st minute. On 14 February 2021, in a 2–1 win over the rivals Olympiacos as he assisted the first goal of his team scored by Maurício and scored his second goal for the club in the 73rd minute.

Sankharé joined Giresunspor in Turkey for the 2021–22 season. His contract was terminated on 15 February 2022 by mutual consent.

== International career ==
In March 2013, it was announced that Sankharé had rejected the chance to play for Mauritania and would like to play for Senegal at international level. He declared his international future with Senegal in December 2014. He got his first callup for a friendly against Algeria in October 2015.

== Career statistics ==
=== Club ===
As of 18:08, 16 May 2021 (UTC)..

Appearances and goals by club, season and competition
| Club | Season | League | | | Cup (Note: Includes the Coupe de France.) | | League Cup (Note: Includes the Coupe de la Ligue.) | | Continental (Note: Includes the UEFA Champions League and UEFA Europa League.) | | Other (Note: Includes the Trophée des Champions.) | | Total | |
| Club | Season | Division | Apps | Goals | Apps | Goals | Apps | Goals | Apps | Goals | Apps | Goals | Apps | Goals |
|---|---|---|---|---|---|---|---|---|---|---|---|---|---|---|
| Paris Saint-Germain | 2007–08 | Ligue 1 | 9 | 0 | 0 | 0 | 0 | 0 | 0 | 0 | 0 | 0 | 9 | 0 |
| Paris Saint-Germain | 2008–09 | Ligue 1 | 2 | 0 | 0 | 0 | 0 | 0 | 4 (Note: Four appearances in 2008–09 UEFA Cup) | 0 | 0 | 0 | 6 | 0 |
| Paris Saint-Germain | 2009–10 | Ligue 1 | 22 | 1 | 1 | 0 | 2 | 0 | 0 | 0 | 0 | 0 | 25 | 1 |
| Paris Saint-Germain | Total | | 33 | 1 | 1 | 0 | 2 | 0 | 4 | 0 | 0 | 0 | 40 | 1 |
| Paris Saint-Germain II | 2010–11 | CFA | 3 | 0 | — | | — | | — | | 0 | 0 | 3 | 0 |
| Reims (loan) | 2008–09 | Ligue 2 | 17 | 0 | — | | — | | — | | 0 | 0 | 17 | 0 |
| Dijon (loan) | 2010–11 | Ligue 2 | 27 | 6 | 0 | 0 | 0 | 0 | — | | 0 | 0 | 27 | 6 |
| Dijon | 2011–12 | Ligue 1 | 33 | 4 | 2 | 0 | 3 | 1 | — | | 0 | 0 | 38 | 5 |
| Dijon | 2012–13 | Ligue 2 | 7 | 0 | 0 | 0 | 0 | 0 | — | | 0 | 0 | 7 | 0 |
| Dijon | Total | | 40 | 4 | 2 | 0 | 3 | 1 | 0 | 0 | 0 | 0 | 45 | 5 |
| Valenciennes (loan) | 2012–13 | Ligue 1 | 13 | 0 | 0 | 0 | — | | — | | 0 | 0 | 13 | 0 |
| Valenciennes II (loan) | 2012–13 | CFA | 1 | 0 | — | | — | | — | | 0 | 0 | 1 | 0 |
| Guingamp | 2013–14 | Ligue 1 | 36 | 3 | 3 | 0 | 1 | 0 | — | | 0 | 0 | 40 | 3 |
| Guingamp | 2014–15 | Ligue 1 | 29 | 0 | 5 | 0 | 1 | 0 | 6 (Note: Six appearances in 2014–15 UEFA Europa League) | 0 | 0 | 0 | 41 | 0 |
| Guingamp | 2015–16 | Ligue 1 | 33 | 6 | 1 | 0 | 2 | 0 | — | | 0 | 0 | 36 | 6 |
| Guingamp | Total | | 98 | 9 | 9 | 0 | 4 | 0 | 6 | 0 | 0 | 0 | 117 | 9 |
| Guingamp II | 2014–15 | CFA 2 | 1 | 0 | — | | — | | — | | 0 | 0 | 1 | 0 |
| Lille | 2016–17 | Ligue 1 | 21 | 2 | 0 | 0 | 1 | 0 | 1 (Note: One appearance in 2016–17 UEFA Europa League) | 0 | 0 | 0 | 23 | 2 |
| Bordeaux | 2016–17 | Ligue 1 | 16 | 4 | 2 | 1 | — | | — | | — | | 18 | 5 |
| Bordeaux | 2017–18 | Ligue 1 | 29 | 7 | 1 | 1 | 1 | 0 | 2 | 2 | — | | 33 | 10 |
| Bordeaux | 2018–19 | Ligue 1 | 22 | 1 | 0 | 0 | 1 | 1 | 10 | 2 | — | | 33 | 4 |
| Bordeaux | 2019–20 | Ligue 1 | 0 | 0 | 0 | 0 | 0 | 0 | — | | — | | 0 | 0 |
| Bordeaux | Total | | 67 | 12 | 3 | 2 | 2 | 1 | 12 | 4 | 0 | 0 | 84 | 19 |
| CSKA Sofia | 2020–21 | First League | 12 | 3 | 1 | 0 | – | | 10 (Note: One appearance in 2020–21 UEFA Europa League) | 0 | – | | 23 | 3 |
| Panathinaikos | 2020–21 | Super League Greece | 10 | 3 | 1 | 0 | — | | — | | — | | 11 | 3 |
| Career total | | | 343 | 40 | 17 | 2 | 12 | 2 | 31 | 6 | 0 | 0 | 405 | 48 |

=== International ===
As of 3 June 2019.

Appearances and goals by national team and year
| National team | Year | Apps | Goals |
|---|---|---|---|
| Senegal | 2015 | 2 | 0 |
| Senegal | 2016 | 4 | 1 |
| Senegal | 2017 | 1 | 0 |
| Total | | 7 | 1 |

As of match played 3 June 2019

Scores and results list Senegal's goal tally first, score column indicates score after each Sankharé goal.

List of international goals scored by Younousse Sankharé
| No. | Date | Venue | Cap | Opponent | Score | Result | Competition |
|---|---|---|---|---|---|---|---|
| 1 | 28 May 2016 | Amahoro Stadium, Kigali, Rwanda | 4 | Rwanda | 2–0 | 2–0 | Friendly |

== Honours ==
=== Club ===
Paris Saint-Germain

- Coupe de France: 2009–10
- Coupe de la Ligue: 2007–08

Guingamp

- Coupe de France: 2013–14
