= Lukas Lerager =

Danish footballer (born 1993)

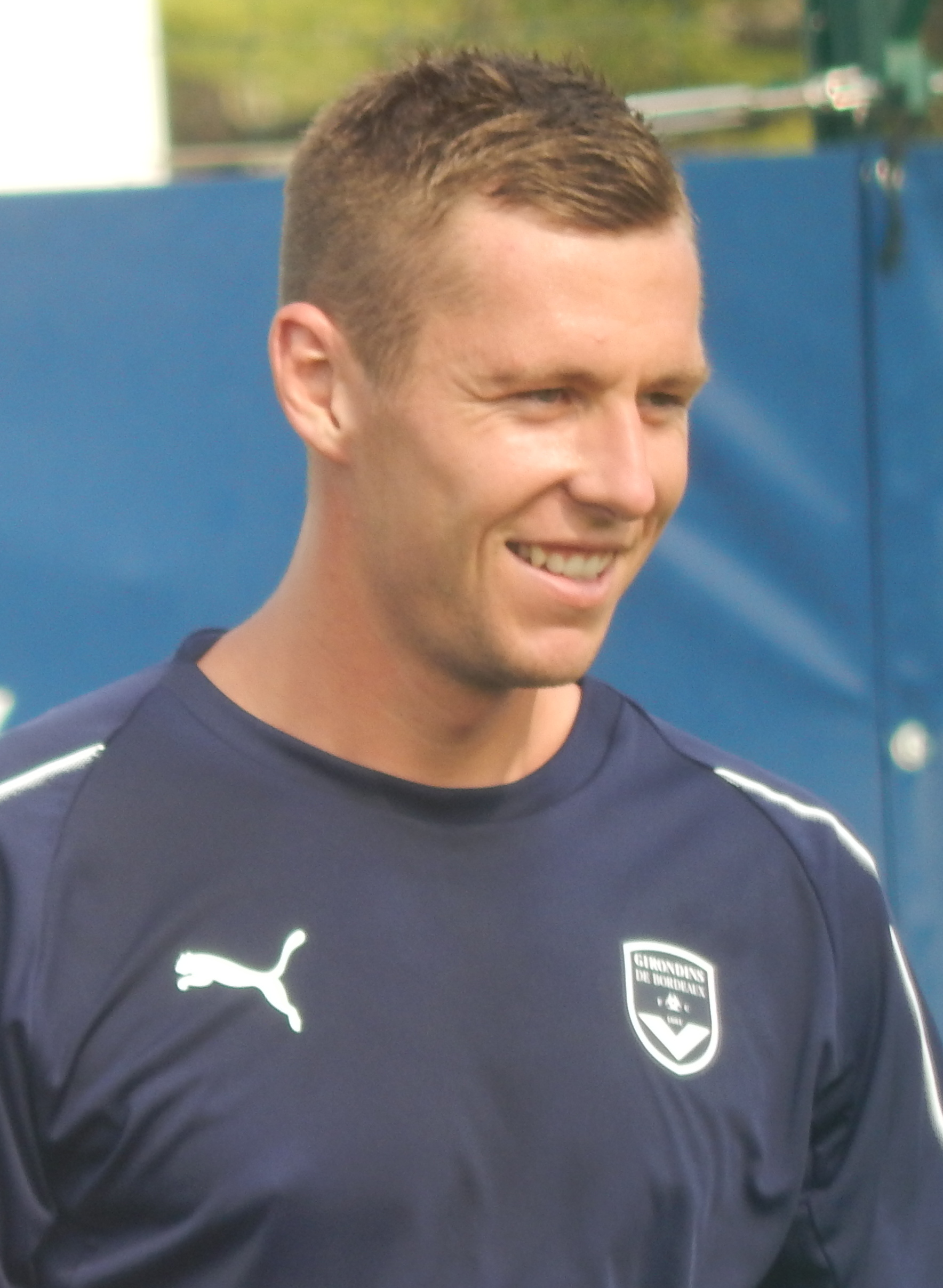
- Lerager with Bordeaux in 2018

Personal information
- Full name: Lukas Reiff Lerager
- Date of birth: 12 July 1993 (age 33)
- Place of birth: Gladsaxe, Denmark
- Height: 1.88 m (6 ft 2 in)
- Position: Midfielder

Team information
- Current team: Widzew Łódź
- Number: 21

Senior career*
Years	Team	Apps	(Gls)
2010–2013	AB	50	(3)
2013–2016	Viborg	67	(1)
2016–2017	Zulte Waregem	39	(6)
2017–2019	Bordeaux	55	(3)
2019	→ Genoa (loan)	14	(1)
2019–2021	Genoa	37	(1)
2021–2022	→ Copenhagen (loan)	46	(10)
2022–2026	Copenhagen	97	(10)
2026–	Widzew Łódź	10	(1)

International career
2011	Denmark U18	3	(0)
2011–2012	Denmark U19	6	(0)
2012	Denmark U20	6	(0)
2013	Denmark U21	1	(0)
2017–2019	Denmark	10	(1)
- * Club domestic league appearances and goals as of 17:41, 26 April 2026 (UTC)

Lukas Reiff Lerager (born 12 July 1993) is a Danish professional footballer who plays as a midfielder for Ekstraklasa club Widzew Łódź.

== Club career ==
Lerager played club football for AB, Viborg and Zulte Waregem.

He joined French club Bordeaux in June 2017, signing a four-year contract.

On 29 January 2019, Lerager signed to Italian Serie A club Genoa on loan with an option to buy. The deal was later turned permanent.

He moved on loan to Copenhagen on 1 February 2021. The transfer was made permanent on 21 May 2022. On 12 December 2023, he scored the only goal in a 1–0 victory over Galatasaray, which qualified his club to the Champions League knockout stages. On 19 November 2025, Copenhagen announced Lerager would leave the club at the end of the year upon the expiration of his contract.

On 17 December 2025, Lerager signed for Polish Ekstraklasa side Widzew Łódź, effective from January 2026. He scored his first goal for Widzew in a 2–0 win over Motor Lublin on 27 April 2026. Later in that game, he ruptured his Achilles tendon, requiring a full reconstruction; he is expected to be sidelined for the rest of the year.

== International career ==
After representing them at youth level, Lerager made his debut for the Denmark senior national team in 2017.

In June 2018, he was named in Denmark's 23-man squad for the 2018 FIFA World Cup in Russia.

== Career statistics ==
=== Club ===
As of match played 26 April 2026

Appearances and goals by club, season and competition
Club	Season	League			Cup (Note: Includes Danish Cup, Belgian Cup, Coupe de France, Coupe de la Ligue, Coppa Italia, Polish Cup)		Europe		Total	
Club	Season	Division	Apps	Goals	Apps	Goals	Apps	Goals	Apps	Goals
AB	2010–11	Danish 1st Division	4	0	0	0	—		4	0
AB	2011–12	Danish 1st Division	18	2	0	0	—		18	2
AB	2012–13	Danish 1st Division	26	1	0	0	—		26	1
AB	Total		48	3	0	0	0	0	48	3
Viborg	2013–14	Danish Superliga	19	0	0	0	—		19	0
Viborg	2014–15	Danish 1st Division	17	1	1	0	—		18	1
Viborg	2015–16	Danish Superliga	31	0	2	1	—		33	1
Viborg	Total		67	1	3	1	0	0	70	2
Zulte Waregem	2016–17	Belgian First Division A	39	6	5	0	—		44	6
Bordeaux	2017–18	Ligue 1	37	3	2	0	1 (Note: Appearance(s) in UEFA Europa League)	0	40	3
Bordeaux	2018–19	Ligue 1	18	0	1	0	9	0	28	0
Bordeaux	Total		55	3	3	0	10	0	68	3
Genoa (loan)	2018–19	Serie A	14	1	0	0	—		14	1
Genoa	2019–20	Serie A	21	1	1	0	—		22	1
Genoa	2020–21	Serie A	16	0	3	1	—		19	1
Genoa	Total		37	1	4	1	0	0	41	2
Copenhagen (loan)	2020–21	Danish Superliga	17	4	0	0	0	0	17	4
Copenhagen (loan)	2021–22	Danish Superliga	29	6	1	0	13 (Note: Appearances in UEFA Conference League)	3	43	9
Copenhagen (loan)	Total		46	10	1	0	13	3	60	13
Copenhagen	2022–23	Danish Superliga	30	6	6	0	8 (Note: Appearances in UEFA Champions League)	1	44	7
Copenhagen	2023–24	Danish Superliga	26	2	3	2	12	3	41	7
Copenhagen	2024–25	Danish Superliga	24	1	7	3	11	0	42	4
Copenhagen	2025–26	Danish Superliga	17	1	4	0	10	0	31	1
Copenhagen	Total		97	10	20	5	41	4	158	19
Widzew Łódź	2025–26	Ekstraklasa	10	1	1	0	—		11	1
Career total			413	36	37	7	64	7	514	50

=== International ===
As of match played 15 October 2019

Appearances and goals by national team and year
National team	Year	Apps	Goals
Denmark	2017	2	0
Denmark	2018	6	1
Denmark	2019	2	0
Total		10	1

Scores and results list Denmark's goal tally first, score column indicates score after each Lerager goal.

List of international goals scored by Lukas Lerager
No.	Date	Venue	Opponent	Score	Result	Competition
1	16 October 2018	MCH Arena, Herning, Denmark	Austria	1–0	2–0	Friendly

== Honours ==
Viborg

- Danish 1st Division: 2014–15

Zulte Waregem

- Belgian Cup: 2016–17

Copenhagen

- Danish Superliga: 2021–22, 2022–23, 2024–25
- Danish Cup: 2022–23 2024–25
