= Maxime Poundjé =

French footballer (born 1992)

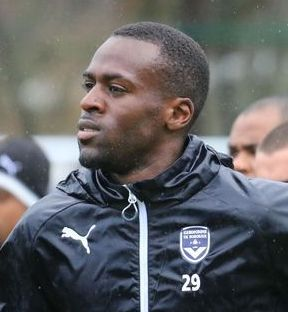
- Poundjé in 2017

Personal information
- Full name: Maxime Aurélien Poundjé
- Date of birth: 16 August 1992 (age 34)
- Place of birth: Bordeaux, France
- Height: 1.79 m (5 ft 10 in)
- Position: Left back

Youth career
- 2000–2001: C. Pyrénées Aquitaine Bordeaux
- 2001–2003: USJ Saint-Augustin C. Pyrénées
- 2003–2010: Bordeaux

Senior career*
Years	Team	Apps	(Gls)
2011–2021	Bordeaux	118	(1)
2012–2017	Bordeaux II	36	(4)
2011–2012	→ Nîmes (loan)	29	(0)
2022	Lausanne-Sport	13	(0)

International career^{‡}
2009–2010	France U18	6	(0)
2011	France U19	4	(0)
- * Club domestic league appearances and goals as of 22 May 2022 ‡ National team caps and goals as of 31 August 2012

Maxime Aurélien Poundjé (born 16 August 1992) is a French professional footballer who plays as a defender.

== Early life ==
Poundjé was born in France to Cameroonian parents, and has dual nationality. He acquired French nationality on 14 May 2001, through the collective effect of his father's naturalization.

== Club career ==
On 13 February 2022, Poundjé signed with Lausanne-Sport in Switzerland.

== International career ==
Poundjé is a former youth international for France, and has received a callup to the Cameroon national football team which he rejected.
