= Vukašin Jovanović (footballer, born 1996) =

Serbian footballer (born 1996)

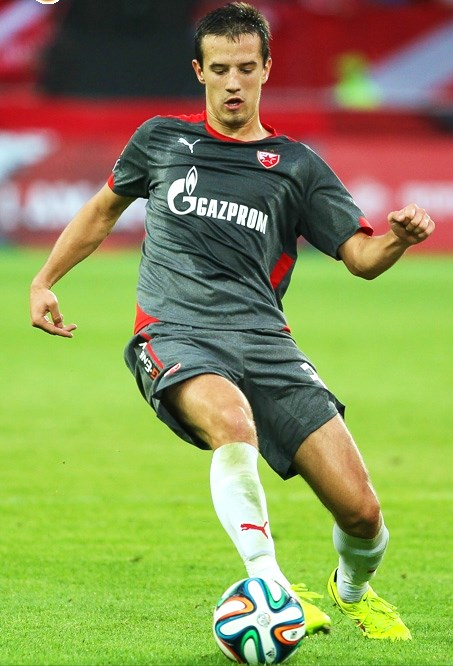
- Jovanović with Red Star Belgrade in 2014

Personal information
- Date of birth: 17 May 1996 (age 30)
- Place of birth: Belgrade, FR Yugoslavia
- Height: 1.88 m (6 ft 2 in)
- Position: Centre-back

Team information
- Current team: IMT
- Number: 6

Youth career
- FK Winner
- Red Star Belgrade

Senior career*
Years	Team	Apps	(Gls)
2014–2016	Red Star Belgrade	32	(2)
2016–2017	Zenit-2 St. Petersburg	25	(1)
2017	→ Bordeaux (loan)	8	(0)
2017–2021	Bordeaux	41	(0)
2018	→ Eibar (loan)	0	(0)
2021–2023	Apollon Limassol	27	(0)
2023–2025	Čukarički	48	(0)
2026–	IMT	15	(1)

International career^{‡}
2013	Serbia U17	1	(0)
2014–2015	Serbia U19	10	(0)
2015	Serbia U20	5	(0)
2015–2019	Serbia U21	25	(0)
Medal record
Gold medal – first place	FIFA U-20 World Cup	2015
- * Club domestic league appearances and goals as of 13 June 2026 ‡ National team caps and goals as of 24 June 2019

Vukašin Jovanović (Serbian Cyrillic: Вукашин Јовановић, pronounced [ʋukǎʃin jǒʋanoʋitɕ, joʋǎː-]; born 17 May 1996) is a Serbian professional footballer who plays as a centre-back for IMT.

== Club career ==
=== Red Star Belgrade ===
Jovanović first began playing competitive football in Red Star's youth system. He joined the first team under coach Slaviša Stojanovič in March 2014. He made his professional debut for Red Star Belgrade on 9 August 2014, under coach Nenad Lalatović, when he came on the field as a substitute for Darko Lazić in a match against Radnički Niš. He signed his first professional contract on 12 August 2014, a couple of days after his official debut.

=== Zenit Saint Petersburg ===
On 20 February 2016, Jovanović signed with Russian club Zenit Saint Petersburg, reportedly on a 4.5-year contract. Although he trained with Zenit's first team, Jovanović played only for Zenit's reserves.

=== Bordeaux ===
On 31 January 2017, he joined the French club Bordeaux on loan until the end of the 2016–17 season. He played nine games during the loan, and at the end of the season Bordeaux decided to purchase him for approximately €3 million.

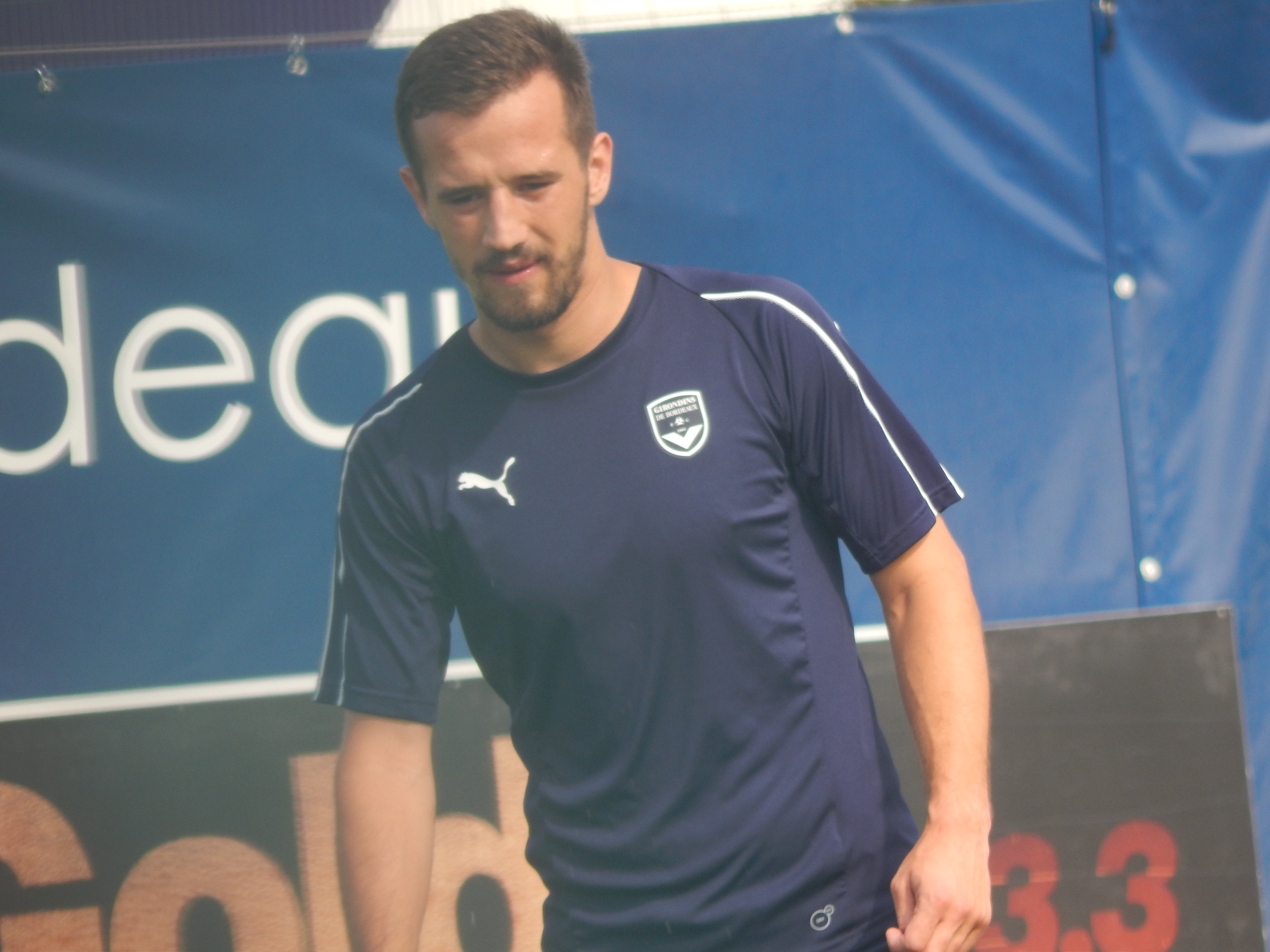
Vukašin Jovanović here playing for Bordeaux in 2018

== International career ==
Jovanović began playing for the national selections at the U-17 and U-18 categories. He was called up by Serbia youth coach Veljko Paunović for the 2014 UEFA European Under-19 Championship. In the tournament, he first played in Srđan Babić's place due to his card suspension, but later he played all four matches. Subsequently, Jovanović played for Serbia's U20 squad which won the 2015 FIFA U20 World Cup in New Zealand.

== Career statistics ==
As of end of 2021–22 season

Appearances and goals by club, season and competition
Club	Season	League		Cup		Continental		Other		Total	
Club	Season	Apps	Goals	Apps	Goals	Apps	Goals	Apps	Goals	Apps	Goals
Red Star Belgrade	2014–15	13	0	0	0	0	0	—		13	0
Red Star Belgrade	2015–16	19	2	2	0	1	0	—		22	2
Red Star Belgrade	Total	32	2	2	0	1	0	—		35	2
Zenit-2 Saint Petersburg	2015–16	12	1	0	0	0	0	—		12	1
Zenit-2 Saint Petersburg	2016–17	13	0	0	0	0	0	—		13	0
Zenit-2 Saint Petersburg	Total	25	1	0	0	0	0	—		25	1
Bordeaux (loan)	2016–17	8	0	1	0	0	0	—		9	0
Bordeaux	2017–18	16	0	0	0	0	0	—		16	0
Bordeaux	2018–19	16	0	1	0	1	0	1 (Note: Appearance in Coupe de la Ligue)	0	19	0
Bordeaux	2019–20	9	0	1	0	0	0	1	0	11	0
Bordeaux	2020–21	0	0	1	0	0	0	0	0	1	0
Bordeaux	Total	41	0	3	0	1	0	2	0	47	0
Apollon Limassol	2021–22	11	0	2	0	0	0	—		13	0
Career total		117	3	8	0	2	0	2	0	129	3

== Honours ==
Zenit

- Russian Super Cup: 2016

Serbia

- FIFA U-20 World Cup: 2015
