= 2012 Trophée des Champions =

- Red Bull Arena, in Harrison, New Jersey, hosted the match.
- Event: Trophée des Champions
Montpellier	Lyon
Ligue 1	Ligue 1
2	2
- Lyon won 4–2 on penalties
- Date: 28 July 2012
- Venue: Red Bull Arena, Harrison, New Jersey, US
- Referee: Jorge Gonzalez (United States)
- Attendance: 15,166
- Weather: Mostly cloudy 79 °F (26 °C)

The 2012 Trophée des Champions (English: 2012 Champions Trophy) was the 17th edition of the French super cup. The match was contested by Montpellier, the 2011–12 Ligue 1 champions and Lyon, the winners of the 2011–12 edition of the Coupe de France. The match was played at Red Bull Arena in Harrison, New Jersey. This was the fourth consecutive time the competition had taken place on international soil. The defending champions were Marseille who defeated Lille in the 2011 edition, which was played in Morocco.

Lyon captured its eighth Trophée des Champions and its first since 2007 after defeating Montpellier 4–2 on penalties. The match ended 2–2 in regular time with John Utaka and Emanuel Herrera scoring goals for Montpellier and Bafétimbi Gomis and Jimmy Briand converting for Lyon.

== Match ==
=== Details ===
28 July 2012
15:00 EDT

Montpellier	2–2	Lyon
Utaka 27'; Herrera 56' (pen.)	Report	Gomis 44'; Briand 77'
Penalties
Charbonnier (penalty missed); Camara (penalty scored); Bedimo (penalty missed); Yanga-Mbiwa (penalty scored)	2–4	(penalty missed) Fofana; (penalty scored) Cissokho; (penalty scored) Koné; (penalty scored) Benzia; (penalty scored) Briand

Red Bull Arena, Harrison, New Jersey
Attendance: 15,166
Referee: Jorge Gonzalez (United States)

Montpellier	Lyon

MONTPELLIER:
GK	16	(France) Geoffrey Jourdren
RB	12	(France) Daniel Congré
CB	3	(France) Mapou Yanga-Mbiwa (c)	(yellow card) 60'
CB	4	(Brazil) Hilton
LB	5	(Cameroon) Henri Bedimo	(yellow card) 79'
CM	13	(Chile) Marco Estrada	(red card) 78'
CM	23	(Tunisia) Jamel Saihi
AM	20	(France) Rémy Cabella		(substituted off) 64'
RW	7	(Nigeria) John Utaka
LW	8	(France) Anthony Mounier		(substituted off) 80'
FW	11	(Argentina) Emanuel Herrera		(substituted off) 74'
Substitutes:
GK	1	(France) Laurent Pionnier
DF	27	(France) Cyril Jeunechamp
MF	6	(France) Joris Marveaux
MF	18	(Morocco) Karim Aït-Fana
MF	22	(France) Benjamin Stambouli		(substituted on) 80'
FW	9	(France) Gaëtan Charbonnier		(substituted on) 74'
FW	19	(Senegal) Souleymane Camara		(substituted on) 64'
Manager:
René Girard

LYON:
GK	1	(France) Hugo Lloris
RB	14	(France) Mouhamadou Dabo		(substituted off) 81'
CB	3	(Brazil) Cris
CB	4	(Burkina Faso) Bakary Koné
LB	20	(France) Aly Cissokho
CM	21	(France) Maxime Gonalons (c)
CM	15	(France) Gueïda Fofana
AM	8	(France) Yoann Gourcuff
RW	10	(France) Alexandre Lacazette	(yellow card) 29'
LW	19	(France) Jimmy Briand
FW	18	(France) Bafétimbi Gomis		(substituted off) 65'
Substitutes:
GK	30	(France) Rémy Vercoutre
DF	13	(France) Anthony Réveillère		(substituted on) 81'
DF	23	(France) Samuel Umtiti
MF	7	(France) Clément Grenier
MF	12	(France) Jordan Ferri
MF	24	(France) Jérémy Pied
FW	25	(Algeria) Yassine Benzia		(substituted on) 65'
Manager:
Rémi Garde

MATCH OFFICIALS

- Assistant referees:
  - Gregory Barkey (United States)
  - Brian Dunn (United States)
- Fourth official: Terry Vaughn (United States)
- Principle Delegate: Bernard Docquiert

MATCH RULES

- 90 minutes.
- Penalty shoot-out if scores level after 90 minutes.
- Seven named substitutes
- Maximum of six substitutions.

== See also ==
- 2012–13 Ligue 1
- 2012–13 Coupe de France
- 2012–13 Olympique Lyonnais season
- 2012–13 Montpellier HSC season
