= 2011 Coupe de la Ligue final =

- Event: 2010–11 Coupe de la Ligue
| Marseille | Montpellier |
| Ligue 1 | Ligue 1 |
| 1 | 0 |
- Date: 23 April 2011
- Venue: Stade de France, Saint-Denis
- Man of the Match: Taye Taiwo
- Referee: Antony Gautier (Nord-Pas-de-Calais)
- Attendance: 78,511
- Weather: 20 °C (68 °F), Partly Cloudy

The 2011 Coupe de la Ligue final was the 17th final of France's football league cup competition, the Coupe de la Ligue, a football competition for the 44 teams that the Ligue de Football Professionnel manages. The final took place on 23 April 2011 at the Stade de France in Saint-Denis and was contested between Marseille and Montpellier. Marseille were the defending champions of the competition and was the fourth club in the competition's history to appear in the final match in back-to-back seasons. The winner was guaranteed a UEFA Europa League place for the 2011–12 season with their appearance being dependent on whether they qualify for the 2011–12 UEFA Champions League. The final and both semi-finals were broadcast live on France 2.

Marseille successfully defended its title after defeating Montpellier 1–0 courtesy of a second half goal from Taye Taiwo. The title resulted in Marseille becoming the first club in Coupe de la Ligue history to repeat as champions. For the first time in the competition's history, an official Best Player award was given out following the match. The award is sponsored by l'Institut du cerveau et de la moelle épinière (English: Institute for Brain and Spinal Cord Disorders) and its inaugural winner was the lone goal-scorer Taye Taiwo. The award was presented to the player by France national team manager Laurent Blanc, who serves as an ambassador for the institute.

On 24 April, the Ligue de Football Professionnel announced that it was investigating the Best Player award winner for his actions following the match. The Nigerian defender reportedly made provocative and offensive remarks about the club's Le Classique rivals Paris Saint-Germain while celebrating with Marseille supporters. After being condemned for his actions by Marseille's management and its staff and players, Taiwo issued an apology on the club's official website.

== News ==
=== Five referee system for cup ===
On 20 August 2010, the Ligue de Football Professionnel confirmed that the Coupe de la Ligue would utilized the five-referee system that is currently being used in the UEFA Champions League and the UEFA Europa League. The announcement made the competition the first national cup competition in Europe to adopt the system and was approved by the International Football Association Board (IFAB) on 21 July. The system officially began on 24 August with the start of the second round matches and was in place until the final.

=== Team backgrounds ===
Marseille made its second appearance in the final of the Coupe de la Ligue. The club was the competition's defending champions having defeated Bordeaux 3–1 in last year's final and were the fourth club in the competition's history to appear in the final match in back-to-back seasons. Montpellier made its debut in the ultimate match of the Coupe de la Ligue. The club's last major finals appearance in a cup competition was in the 1993–94 season when it reached the final of the Coupe de France. In 1992, Montpellier won the Coupe d'été (English: Summer Cup). The competition was not recognized by the Ligue de Football Professionnel and abolished in 1994, however, the Coupe de la Ligue took a heavy influence from the competition. On 26 January 2011, the defending champions Marseille were designated as the home team for the match. A week before the Coupe de la Ligue Final was to take place, Marseille and Montpellier faced each other in a league match. Marseille defeated hosts Montpellier 2–1 in the match, despite the home team taking a 1–0 lead late in the second half.

=== Ticketing ===
The Coupe de la Ligue final has been played every year at the Stade de France since 1998, following the stadium's completion. The stadium has a capacity of 81,338 spectators. Each club that participated in the final received the same quota of tickets, which were distributed to season ticket holders and through each club's ticket sales at a later date. Tickets went on sale to the general public in the third week of March 2011, a month before the final. Pricing was defined by category with Category 1 seats, the highest category, being priced at €90 and Category 4, the lowest, going for €45. The Category 4 seats were primarily reserved for each club's supporters.

=== Officials ===
On 7 April, the Ligue de Football Professionnel announced that referee Antony Gautier of Nord-Pas-de-Calais would officiate the 2011 Coupe de la Ligue final. Gautier officiated only one match involving either of the two teams this season; a 2–1 home loss for Montpellier against Nancy on 11 September 2010. He refereed his first league cup final and was assisted by Mickaël Annonier of Atlantique and Nicolas Pottier of Maine. Saïd Ennjimi of Centre-Ouest serve as the fourth official.

== Route to the final ==
Note: In all results below, the score of the finalist is given first (H: home; A: away).

| Marseille | | Round | Montpellier | |
|---|---|---|---|---|
| Opponent | Result | 2010–11 Coupe de la Ligue | Opponent | Result |
| Guingamp (A) | 1–0 | Round of 16 | Ajaccio (H) | 2–0 |
| Monaco (H) | 2–1 | Quarter-finals | Lille (H) | 2–1 |
| Auxerre (A) | 2–0 | Semi-finals | Paris Saint-Germain (H) | 1–0 (a.e.t.) |

=== Marseille ===
Due to participating in European competition, the defending champions Marseille entered the competition in the Round of 16 for the fourth consecutive season. The club began the defence of its title away to Championnat National club Guingamp at the Stade du Roudourou. Marseille recorded a 1–0 victory over the Bretons thanks to a first half goal from the Ghanaian André Ayew. Marseille faced first division foes AS Monaco in the quarterfinals. In the match, which was played at the Stade Vélodrome, Monaco took the lead midway through the first half after midfielder Mathieu Coutadeur converted a penalty. Just before half-time, Ayew equalized scoring his second goal of the competition. In the second half, Spanish defender César Azpilicueta netted the game-winner to give Marseille a 2–1 victory. In the semi-finals, Les Phocéens were pitted against fellow UEFA Champions League participants Auxerre. A first half injury time goal from Brandão was enough to hold off Auxerre. Marseille later added a second half goal from André-Pierre Gignac to assured the club a 2–0 victory. The semi-final win resulted in Marseille becoming the fourth club in the competition's history to appear in the final match in back-to-back seasons.

=== Montpellier ===
Similar to Marseille, Montpellier began the competition in the Round of 16 due to the club's participation in the UEFA Europa League, though the club was eliminated from Europe months before its first match in the Coupe de la Ligue. Montpellier opened up the competition at home at the Stade de la Mosson against second division club Ajaccio. Goals from the Turk Hasan Kabze and club youth product Bangali-Fodé Koita was enough to secure Montpellier a 2–0 shutout win. In the quarterfinals, Montpellier, for the second straight round, played at home and faced a tough test against Lille. Similar to the previous match, Kabze opened the scoring in the first half. The Turkish international later added another goal in the 52nd minute to give Montpellier a 2–0 lead. Lille drew one goal closer following a strike from Eden Hazard in the 67th minute. Despite constant pressure from Lille, the hosts were able to hold onto its 2–1 advantage to progress to the semi-finals where they faced the defending Coupe de France champions Paris Saint-Germain. After 90 minutes, both club's were goalless, which resulted in the match going into extra time. Two minutes from time, Montpellier striker Olivier Giroud netted the game-winning goal to give Montpellier's its first appearance in a final match since the 1994 edition of the Coupe de France.

== Match ==
=== Pre-match ===
Pre-match festivities included a rehearsed show, which displayed over 70 dancers and acrobats from the Cirque Mandingo and Studios de Cirque, 2,500 metres (1.6 mi) of Kevlar rope, 18 giant balloons that represented the previous Coupe de la Ligue finals as well as the current one, and the Coupe de la Ligue trophy. During the introduction and warm-up of the teams, players wore tee shirts showing support for France Télévisions journalists Hervé Ghesquière and Stéphane Taponier, as well as their three companions. The journalists were kidnapped on 29 December 2009 while working in Afghanistan doing a piece for the Pièces à Conviction magazine and have yet to be released. The shirts displayed the pictures of the two journalists, as well as the statements "Libérez les otages!" (English: Free the hostages!) and "Freedom".

The opening kick-off was done by French triple jumper Teddy Tamgho. Tamgho, who set two world indoor records at the 2011 European Athletics Indoor Championships, was the third athlete in the competition's final history to kick off the final of the Coupe de la Ligue. 1992 and 1996 Olympic gold medalist Marie-José Pérec and 2002 European and 2003 World Championships gold medalist Muriel Hurtis-Houairi were the previous two.

=== Team news ===
Marseille entered the match without French international Loïc Rémy due to suspension. Rémy was given a straight red card in the team's league match on 17 April against Montpellier after getting into a physical altercation with defender Abdel El Kaoutari. Aside from Rémy, Marseille was also without starting right back César Azpilicueta who is currently rehabbing a torn anterior cruciate ligament in his left knee; an injury he suffered in November 2010.

Montpellier entered the match without two players due to suspension. Bosnian international Emir Spahić and French youth international El Kaoutari. El Kaoutari missed the final due to his previously mentioned altercation with Loïc Rémy. Due to previously being given a yellow card in the match, the defender was given a second yellow card for the confrontation with the Marseille striker. Montpellier was also without French youth international Karim Aït-Fana due to injury.

=== Match details ===
23 April 2011
20:45 CEST

| Marseille | 1–0 | Montpellier |
|---|---|---|
| Taiwo 80' | Report |

Stade de France, Saint-Denis
Attendance: 78,511
Referee: Antony Gautier (Nord-Pas-de-Calais)

| Marseille | Montpellier |

MARSEILLE:
| GK | 30 | (France) Steve Mandanda (c) |
| RB | 24 | (France) Rod Fanni |
| CB | 21 | (Senegal) Souleymane Diawara |
| CB | 19 | (Argentina) Gabriel Heinze |
| LB | 3 | (Nigeria) Taye Taiwo |
| DM | 17 | (Cameroon) Stéphane Mbia | | (substituted off) 7' |
| CM | 7 | (France) Benoît Cheyrou |
| CM | 8 | (Argentina) Lucho González | | (substituted off) 85' |
| RW | 28 | (France) Mathieu Valbuena | | (substituted off) 90' |
| LW | 20 | (Ghana) André Ayew |
| FW | 10 | (France) André-Pierre Gignac |
Substitutes:
| GK | 40 | (Brazil) Elinton Andrade |
| DF | 5 | (Brazil) Hilton |
| DF | 26 | (France) Jean-Philippe Sabo |
| MF | 6 | (France) Édouard Cissé |
| MF | 12 | (Burkina Faso) Charles Kaboré | (yellow card) 64' | (substituted on) 7' |
| MF | 18 | (France) Fabrice Abriel | | (substituted on) 85' |
| FW | 15 | (Ghana) Jordan Ayew | | (substituted on) 90' |
Manager:
(France) Didier Deschamps

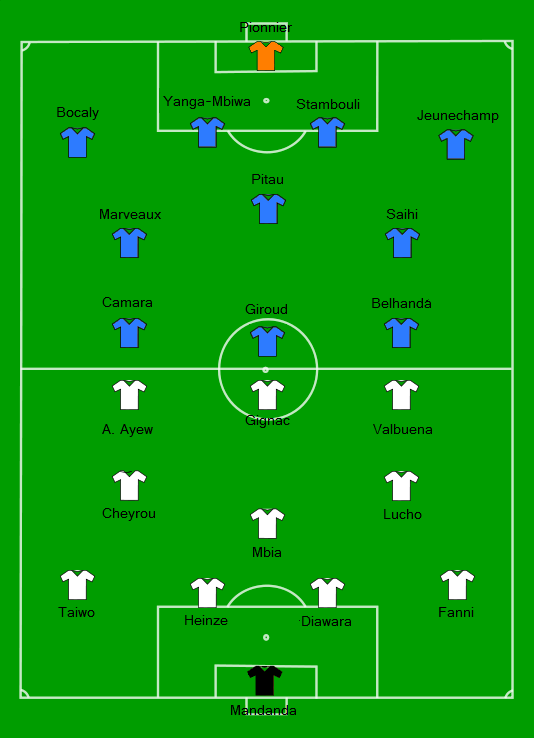

MONTPELLIER:
| GK | 1 | (France) Laurent Pionnier |
| RB | 2 | (France) Garry Bocaly | (yellow card) 77' |
| CB | 3 | (France) Mapou Yanga-M'Biwa |
| CB | 22 | (France) Benjamin Stambouli |
| LB | 27 | (France) Cyril Jeunechamp |
| CM | 6 | (France) Joris Marveaux | | (substituted off) 89' |
| CM | 14 | (France) Romain Pitau (c) | | (substituted off) 73' |
| RM | 29 | (Morocco) Younès Belhanda |
| LM | 23 | (Tunisia) Jamel Saihi |
| FW | 17 | (France) Olivier Giroud |
| FW | 19 | (Senegal) Souleymane Camara | | (substituted off) 83' |
Substitutes:
| GK | 16 | (France) Geoffrey Jourdren |
| DF | 25 | (France) Xavier Collin |
| DF | 31 | (France) Teddy Mézague |
| MF | 12 | (France) Geoffrey Dernis | | (substituted on) 83' |
| MF | 13 | (Chile) Marco Estrada |
| FW | 11 | (Turkey) Hasan Kabze | | (substituted on) 73' |
| FW | 24 | (France) Bangali-Fodé Koita | | (substituted on) 89' |
Manager:
(France) René Girard

MATCH OFFICIALS

- Assistant referees:
  - Mickaël Annonier (Atlantique)
  - Nicolas Pottier (Maine)
- Fourth official: Saïd Ennjimi (Centre-Ouest)
- Chief Delegate: Christian Sercomanens
- Assistant delegates:
  - Michel Bortot
  - Paul DeClaude

MAN OF THE MATCH

- Taye Taiwo (Marseille)

MATCH RULES

- 90 minutes.
- 30 minutes of extra-time if necessary.
- Penalty shoot-out if scores still level.
- Seven named substitutes.
- Maximum of three substitutions.

== See also ==
- 2011 Coupe de France final
- 2010–11 Olympique de Marseille season
