= 2012–13 Montpellier HSC season =

Montpellier HSC
2012–13 season
- Chairman: Laurent Nicollin
- Manager: René Girard
- Stadium: Stade de la Mosson, Montpellier, France
- Ligue 1: 9th
- Coupe de France: Round 32
- Coupe de la Ligue: Semi-finals
- Trophée des Champions: Runners-up
- UEFA Champions League: Group stage
- Top goalscorer: League: Younès Belhanda (10); All: Younès Belhanda; Souleymane Camara (12 each)
Home colours	Away colours

The 2012–13 Montpellier HSC season was the 39th season since the club was refounded.

== Competitions ==
=== Overview ===
Competition	First match	Last match	Starting round	Final position	Record							
Competition	First match	Last match	Starting round	Final position	Pld	W	D	L	GF	GA	GD	Win %
Ligue 1	10 August 2012	26 May 2013	Matchday 1	9th	38	15	7	16	54	51	+3	39.47
Coupe de France	6 January 2013	23 January 2013	Round of 64	Round of 32	2	1	0	1	4	4	+0	50.00
Coupe de la Ligue	31 October 2012	16 January 2013	Round of 16	Semi-finals	3	2	0	1	4	4	+0	66.67
UEFA Champions League	18 September 2012	4 December 2012	Group stage	Group stage	6	0	2	4	6	12	−6	0.00
Total					49	18	9	22	68	71	−3	36.73

Source: Competitions

=== Ligue 1 ===
==== League table ====
Pos	Team	Pld	W	D	L	GF	GA	GD	Pts	Qualification or relegation
7	Bordeaux	38	13	16	9	40	34	+6	55	Qualification for the Europa League group stage (Note: Bordeaux, winner of the 2012–13 Coupe de France, qualified for the Group stage of 2013–14 UEFA Europa League.)
8	Lorient	38	14	11	13	57	58	−1	53	
9	Montpellier	38	15	7	16	54	51	+3	52	
10	Toulouse	38	13	12	13	49	47	+2	51	
11	Valenciennes	38	12	12	14	49	53	−4	48	

Source: Ligue 1
Rules for classification: 1) points; 2) goal difference; 3) number of goals scored.

==== Results summary ====
Overall								Home						Away					
Pld	W	D	L	GF	GA	GD	Pts	W	D	L	GF	GA	GD	W	D	L	GF	GA	GD
38	15	7	16	54	51	+3	52	11	5	3	33	14	+19	4	2	13	21	37	−16

Source: Ligue 1

==== Results by round ====
Round	1	2	3	4	5	6	7	8	9	10	11	12	13	14	15	16	17	18	19	20	21	22	23	24	25	26	27	28	29	30	31	32	33	34	35	36	37	38
Ground	H	A	H	A	A	H	A	H	A	H	A	H	A	H	A	H	A	H	A	H	A	H	H	A	H	A	H	A	H	A	H	A	H	A	H	A	H	A
Result	D	L	L	W	L	D	W	L	L	W	D	D	D	W	L	W	W	W	L	W	L	W	W	L	W	W	W	L	D	L	W	L	L	L	W	L	D	L
Position	16	17	15	15	19	20	20	20	20	20	20	20	20	20	20	20	20	20	20	20	20	20	20	20	20	20	20	20	20	20	20	20	20	20	20	20	20	20

Source: Ligue 1
A = Away; H = Home; W = Win; D = Draw; L = Loss

==== Matches ====
Win Draw Loss

10 August 2012 1	Montpellier	1–1	Toulouse	Montpellier
20:45 CEST (UTC+2)	Camara 34'	Report	Ben Yedder 72'	Stadium: Stade de la Mosson; Attendance: 19,788; Referee: Antony Gautier

18 August 2012 2	Lorient	2–1	Montpellier	Lorient
20:00 CEST (UTC+2)	Traoré 90'; Aliadière 90+2'	Report	Herrera 37'	Stadium: Stade du Moustoir; Attendance: 14,190; Referee: Olivier Thual

26 August 2012 3	Montpellier	0–1	Marseille	Montpellier
17:00 CEST (UTC+2)		Report	Gignac 77'	Stadium: Stade de la Mosson; Attendance: 26,360; Referee: Ruddy Buquet

1 September 2012 4	Sochaux	1–3	Montpellier	Montbéliard
20:00 CEST (UTC+2)	Privat 63'	Report	Belhanda 16' (pen.); Herrera 58'; Cabella 78'	Stadium: Stade Auguste-Bonal; Attendance: 9,554; Referee: Benoît Bastien

14 September 2012 5	Reims	3–1	Montpellier	Reims
20:45 CEST (UTC+2)	Diego 38'; Glombard 71'; Coutet 86'	Report	Cabella 55'	Stadium: Stade Auguste Delaune; Attendance: 15,835; Referee: Tony Chapron

21 September 2012 6	Montpellier	1–1	Saint-Étienne	Montpellier
20:45 CEST (UTC+2)	Camara 70'	Report	Aubameyang 45+3'	Stadium: Stade de la Mosson; Attendance: 16,666; Referee: Lionel Jaffredo

29 September 2012 7	Nancy	0–2	Montpellier	Tomblaine
20:00 CEST (UTC+2)		Report	Belhanda 67'; Camara 90'	Stadium: Stade Marcel Picot; Attendance: 13,867; Referee: Benoît Millot

6 October 2012 8	Montpellier	2–3	Evian	Montpellier
17:00 CEST (UTC+2)	Estrada 36', (yellow card) 67'; Camara 42'; Saihi (yellow card) 50'; Bocaly (yellow card) 85'; Tinhan (yellow card) 90+2'	Summary	Khelifa 30', 62', 89'; Sorlin (yellow card) 45+1'; Sagbo (yellow card) 69'	Stadium: Stade de la Mosson; Attendance: 16,701; Referee: Philippe Kalt

20 October 2012 9	Rennes	2–1	Montpellier	Rennes
20:00 CEST (UTC+2)	Makoun 13'; Erdinç 52'	Summary	Jeunechamp (yellow card) 22'; Belhanda 69' (pen.); Saihi (yellow card) 70'; Stambouli (yellow card) 79'	Stadium: Stade de la Route de Lorient; Attendance: 16,087; Referee: Antony Gautier

27 October 2012 10	Montpellier	3–1	Nice	Montpellier
20:00 CEST (UTC+2)	Utaka (yellow card) 49', (goal) 64'; Camara 53'; Bedimo (yellow card) 63'; Congré (yellow card) 80'; Charbonnier (yellow card) 86'; Civelli 87' (o.g.); Bocaly (red card) 90+1'	Summary	Cvitanich 90+1' (pen.); Traoré (yellow card) 90+2'	Stadium: Stade de la Mosson; Attendance: 15,549; Referee: Benoit Bastien

3 November 2012 11	Troyes	1–1	Montpellier	Troyes
20:00 CET (UTC+1)	Camus 41'; Thiago Xavier (yellow card) 69'	Summary	Belhanda 19'; Saihi (yellow card) 55'; Charbonnier (yellow card) 61'	Stadium: Stade de l'Aube; Attendance: 10,446; Referee: Benoît Millot

11 November 2012 12	Montpellier	1–1	Paris Saint-Germain	Montpellier
21:00 CET (UTC+1)	Jeunechamp (yellow card) 32'; Belhanda (yellow card) 53' (yellow-red card) 65'; Cabella 60'; Saihi (yellow card) 68'	Summary	Sakho (red card) 10'; Motta (yellow card) 32'; Maxwell 37'; Verratti (yellow card) 50'; Van der Wiel (yellow card) 70'	Stadium: Stade de la Mosson; Attendance: 22,242; Referee: Clement Turpin

17 November 2012 13	Valenciennes	1–1	Montpellier	Valenciennes
20:00 CET (UTC+1)	Pujol 39'; Gomis (yellow card) 54'; Kadir (yellow card) 90'	Summary	Charbonnier 15'; Mounier (yellow card) 42'; Saihi (red card) 57'; Cabella (yellow card) 58'; Jourdren (yellow card) 90+2'	Stadium: Stade du Hainaut; Attendance: 14,967; Referee: Laurent Duhamel

25 November 2012 14	Montpellier	1–0	Bordeaux	Montpellier
14:00 CET (UTC+1)	Cabella 69'	Report		Stadium: Stade de la Mosson; Referee: Ruddy Buquet

1 December 2012 15	Lyon	1–0	Montpellier	Lyon
17:00 CET (UTC+1)	Gomis 26'	Report		Stadium: Stade de Gerland; Referee: Lionel Jaffredo

8 December 2012 16	Montpellier	3–0	Ajaccio	Montpellier
20:00 CET (UTC+1)	Utaka 28'; Cabella 32'; Belhanda 67'	Report		Stadium: Stade de la Mosson; Referee: Saïd Ennjimi

12 December 2012 17	Brest	1–2	Montpellier	Brest
19:00 CET (UTC+1)	Ben Basat 14'	Report	Martial 21' (o.g.); Utaka 57'	Stadium: Stade Francis-Le Blé; Referee: Amaury Delerue

15 December 2012 18	Montpellier	4–0	Bastia	Montpellier
20:00 CET (UTC+1)	Estrada 14'; Herrera 48'; Belhanda 60'; Mounier 76'	Report		Stadium: Stade de la Mosson; Referee: Olivier Thual

22 December 2012 19	Lille	4–1	Montpellier	Villeneuve-d'Ascq
17:00 CET (UTC+1)	Congré 24' (o.g.); Payet 43'; Roux 63'; Mendes 75'	Report	Camara 83'	Stadium: Grand Stade Lille Métropole; Referee: Mikael Lesage

12 January 2013 20	Montpellier	2–0	Lorient	Montpellier
20:00 CET (UTC+1)	Charbonnier 79', 90'	Report		Stadium: Stade de la Mosson; Referee: Laurent Duhamel

19 January 2013 21	Marseille	3–2	Montpellier	Marseille
17:00 CET (UTC+1)	A. Ayew 14'; J. Ayew 79'; Gignac 90+1'	Report	Herrera 17'; Utaka 56'	Stadium: Stade Vélodrome; Referee: Lionel Jaffredo

26 January 2013 22	Montpellier	2–0	Sochaux	Montpellier
20:00 CET (UTC+1)	Herrera 28'; Utaka 34'	Report		Stadium: Stade de la Mosson; Referee: Saïd Ennjimi

3 February 2013 23	Montpellier	3–1	Reims	Montpellier
17:00 CET (UTC+1)	Camara 49'; Estrada 65'; Belhanda 71'	Report	Courtet 33'	Stadium: Stade de la Mosson; Referee: Amaury Delerue

9 February 2013 24	Saint-Étienne	4–1	Montpellier	Saint-Étienne
17:00 CET (UTC+1)	Brandão 13'; Aubameyang 29'; Mollo 48'; Bodmer 75'	Report	Cabella 49'	Stadium: Stade Geoffroy-Guichard; Referee: Philippe Kalt

16 February 2013 25	Montpellier	1–0	Nancy	Montpellier
20:00 CET (UTC+1)	Herrera 34'	Report		Stadium: Stade de la Mosson; Referee: Olivier Thual

23 February 2013 26	Evian	0–1	Montpellier	Annecy
20:00 CET (UTC+1)		Report	Belhanda 80'	Stadium: Parc des Sports; Referee: Stéphane Lannoy

1 March 2013 27	Montpellier	2–0	Rennes	Montpellier
20:30 CET (UTC+1)	Camara 75'; Hilton 86'	Report		Stadium: Stade de la Mosson; Referee: Benoît Millot

10 March 2013 28	Nice	2–0	Montpellier	Nice
14:00 CET (UTC+1)	Bahoken 12', 24'	Report		Stadium: Stade du Ray; Referee: Tony Chapron

16 March 2013 29	Montpellier	1–1	Troyes	Montpellier
20:00 CET (UTC+1)	Charbonnier 8'	Report	Jean 51'	Stadium: Stade de la Mosson; Referee: Lionel Jaffredo

29 March 2013 30	Paris Saint-Germain	1–0	Montpellier	Paris
20:30 CET (UTC+1)	Gameiro 80'	Report		Stadium: Parc des Princes; Referee: Wilfried Bien

6 April 2013 31	Montpellier	3–1	Valenciennes	Montpellier
20:00 CEST (UTC+2)	Camara 18'; Congré 60'; Belhanda 86'	Report	Nguette 40'	Stadium: Stade de la Mosson; Referee: Philippe Kalt

13 April 2013 32	Bordeaux	4–2	Montpellier	Bordeaux
20:00 CEST (UTC+2)	Sané 11'; Diabaté 24'; Plašil 26'; Saivet 54'	Report	Cabella 45+1'; Stambouli 90+2'	Stadium: Stade Chaban-Delmas; Referee: Benoît Millot

19 April 2013 33	Montpellier	1–2	Lyon	Montpellier
20:30 CEST (UTC+2)	Belhanda 41'	Report	Lisandro 29'; Grenier 90+3'	Stadium: Stade de la Mosson; Referee: Sébastien Moreira

27 April 2013 34	Ajaccio	2–1	Montpellier	Ajaccio
20:00 CEST (UTC+2)	Delort 82' (pen.); Oliech 90+1'	Report	Mounier 56'	Stadium: Stade François Coty; Referee: Mikael Lesage

4 May 2013 35	Montpellier	2–1	Brest	Montpellier
20:00 CEST (UTC+2)	Estrada 11'; Camara 74' (pen.)	Report	Raspentino 20'	Stadium: Stade de la Mosson; Referee: Jean-Charles Cailleux

11 May 2013 36	Bastia	3–1	Montpellier	Furiani
20:00 CEST (UTC+2)	Beauvue 16'; Modeste 33', 87'	Report	Utaka 31'	Stadium: Stade Armand Cesari; Referee: Antony Gautier

18 May 2013 37	Montpellier	0–0	Lille	Montpellier
21:00 CEST (UTC+2)		Report		Stadium: Stade de la Mosson; Referee: Fredy Fautrel

26 May 2013 38	Toulouse	2–0	Montpellier	Toulouse
21:00 CEST (UTC+2)	Ben Yedder 5', 11'	Report		Stadium: Stadium Municipal; Referee: Mikael Lesage

=== Coupe de France ===
6 January 2013 Round of 64	Bourg-Péronnas	1–2	Montpellier	Péronnas
12:00	Di Tommaso 62' (pen.); Moisy (yellow card) 83'	Summary	Herrera 6'; Camara 33'; Dabo (yellow card) 76'	Stadium: Stade Municipal de Péronnas; Attendance: 7,242; Referee: Benoit Bastien

23 January 2013 Round of 32	Montpellier	2–3 (a.e.t.)	Sochaux	Montpellier
17:00	Charbonnier 16'; Deplagne (yellow card) 41' (goal) 51'; Bedimo (yellow card) 110'	Summary	Contout 43'; Bakambu 79'; Mikari 108'	Stadium: Stade de la Mosson; Attendance: 4,500; Referee: Antony Gautier

=== Coupe de la Ligue ===
31 October 2012 Round of 16	Montpellier	1–0	Bordeaux	Montpellier
18:45	Jeunechamp (yellow card) 19' (yellow-red card) 82'; Tinhan 61'	Summary	Ben Khalfallah (yellow card) 58'; Chalmé (yellow card) 68'	Stadium: Stade de la Mosson; Attendance: 7,339; Referee: Bartolomeu Varela

28 November 2012 Quarter-finals	Montpellier	3–2	Nice	Montpellier
17:00	Cabella 29'; Deplagne (yellow card) 35'; Herrera 52'; Yanga-Mbiwa (yellow card) 76'; Tinhan 83'	Summary	Bosetti 22'; Palun (yellow card) 59'; Bauthéac 66' (pen.); Abriel (yellow card) 71'	Stadium: Stade de la Mosson; Attendance: 6,658; Referee: Fredy Fautrel

16 January 2013 Semi-finals	Rennes	2–0	Montpellier	Rennes
21:00	Féret 7'; Erdinç 51'	Summary	Mounier (yellow card) 23'; Pitau (yellow card) 78'	Stadium: Stade de la Route de Lorient; Attendance: 28,028; Referee: Stephane Lannoy

=== UEFA Champions League ===
==== Group stage ====
Pos	Team	Pld	W	D	L	GF	GA	GD	Pts	Qualification	SCH	ARS	OLY	MPL
1	(Germany) Schalke 04	6	3	3	0	10	6	+4	12	Advance to knockout phase	—	2–2	1–0	2–2
2	(England) Arsenal	6	3	1	2	10	8	+2	10	Advance to knockout phase	0–2	—	3–1	2–0
3	(Greece) Olympiacos	6	3	0	3	9	9	0	9	Transfer to Europa League	1–2	2–1	—	3–1
4	(France) Montpellier	6	0	2	4	6	12	−6	2		1–1	1–2	1–2	—

Source: Soccerway

18 September 2012 1	Montpellier (France)	1–2	(England) Arsenal	Montpellier, France
20:45 CEST	Belhanda 9' (pen.)	Report	Podolski 16'; Gervinho 18'	Stadium: Stade de la Mosson; Attendance: 27,522; Referee: Carlos Velasco Carballo (Spain)

3 October 2012 2	Schalke 04 (Germany)	2–2	(France) Montpellier	Gelsenkirchen, Germany
20:45 CEST	Draxler 26'; Huntelaar 53' (pen.)	Report	Aït-Fana 13'; Camara 90'	Stadium: Veltins-Arena; Attendance: 50,004; Referee: Sergei Karasev (Russia)

24 October 2012 3	Montpellier (France)	1–2	(Greece) Olympiacos	Montpellier, France
20:45 CEST	Charbonnier 49'	Report	Torosidis 73'; Mitroglou 90+1'	Stadium: Stade de la Mosson; Attendance: 22,834; Referee: Daniele Orsato (Italy)

6 November 2012 4	Olympiacos (Greece)	3–1	(France) Montpellier	Piraeus, Greece
20:45 CET	Machado 4'; Greco 80'; Mitroglou 82'	Report	Belhanda 66' (pen.)	Stadium: Karaiskakis Stadium; Attendance: 28,217; Referee: Marijo Strahonja (Croatia)

21 November 2012 5	Arsenal (England)	2–0	(France) Montpellier	London, England
20:45 CET	Wilshere 49'; Podolski 63'	Report		Stadium: Emirates Stadium; Attendance: 59,760; Referee: Fırat Aydınus (Turkey)

4 December 2012 6	Montpellier (France)	1–1	(Germany) Schalke 04	Montpellier, France
20:45 CET	Herrera 59'; Hilton (yellow card) 84'	Report	Höwedes 56'	Stadium: Stade de la Mosson; Attendance: 23,142; Referee: Antonio Mateu Lahoz (Spain)

== Statistics ==
=== Appearances and goals ===
As of the end of the 2012–13 season.

No.	Pos	Nat	Player	Total		Ligue 1		Coupe de France		Coupe de la Ligue		Trophée des Champions		Champions League	
No.	Pos	Nat	Player	Apps	Goals	Apps	Goals	Apps	Goals	Apps	Goals	Apps	Goals	Apps	Goals
1	GK	(France)	Laurent Pionnier	10	0	5	0	1	0	3	0	0	0	1	0
2	DF	(France)	Garry Bocaly	10	0	7	0	0	0	0	0	0	0	3	0
3	DF	(France)	Mapou Yanga-Mbiwa	26	0	16	0	1	0	2	0	1	0	6	0
4	DF	(Brazil)	Vitorino Hilton	40	1	30	1	2	0	2	0	1	0	5	0
5	DF	(Cameroon)	Henri Bedimo	42	0	32	0	2	0	2	0	1	0	5	0
6	MF	(France)	Joris Marveaux	12	0	7	0	0	0	1	0	0	0	4	0
7	FW	(Nigeria)	John Utaka	35	7	28	6	2	0	2	0	1	1	2	0
8	FW	(France)	Anthony Mounier	36	2	26	2	2	0	2	0	1	0	5	0
9	FW	(France)	Gaëtan Charbonnier	34	6	26	4	2	1	2	0	1	0	3	1
10	MF	(Morocco)	Younès Belhanda	37	12	30	10	0	0	1	0	0	0	6	2
11	FW	(Argentina)	Emanuel Herrera	29	5	24	3	2	1	2	0	1	1	0	0
12	DF	(France)	Daniel Congré	46	1	36	1	2	0	3	0	1	0	4	0
13	MF	(Chile)	Marco Estrada	32	4	24	4	1	0	1	0	1	0	5	0
14	MF	(France)	Romain Pitau	21	0	16	0	1	0	3	0	0	0	1	0
15	MF	(France)	Jonathan Tinhan	5	2	1	0	0	0	2	2	0	0	2	0
16	GK	(France)	Geoffrey Jourdren	39	0	33	0	1	0	0	0	1	0	4	0
18	MF	(Morocco)	Karim Aït-Fana	10	1	8	0	0	0	0	0	0	0	2	1
19	FW	(Senegal)	Souleymane Camara	44	12	33	10	2	1	3	0	1	0	5	1
20	MF	(France)	Rémy Cabella	41	8	31	7	1	0	2	1	1	0	6	0
21	DF	(Morocco)	Abdelhamid El Kaoutari	25	0	23	0	1	0	0	0	0	0	1	0
22	MF	(France)	Benjamin Stambouli	28	1	21	1	1	0	1	0	1	0	4	0
23	MF	(Tunisia)	Jamel Saihi	15	0	10	0	0	0	0	0	1	0	4	0
24	FW	(France)	Bengali-Fodé Koita	0	0	0	0	0	0	0	0	0	0	0	0
25	DF	(France)	Mathieu Deplagne	7	1	3	0	1	1	2	0	0	0	1	0
26	MF	(France)	Bryan Dabo	19	0	16	0	2	0	1	0	0	0	0	0
27	DF	(France)	Cyril Jeunechamp	9	0	8	0	0	0	1	0	0	0	0	0
28	MF	(France)	Jonas Martin	20	0	16	0	1	0	2	0	0	0	1	0
29	MF	(France)	Guillaume Legras	0	0	0	0	0	0	0	0	0	0	0	0
30	GK	(France)	Jonathan Ligali	2	0	1	0	0	0	0	0	0	0	1	0
31	DF	(France)	Teddy Mézague	5	0	5	0	0	0	0	0	0	0	0	0
32	MF	(France)	Adrien Coulomb	1	0	0	0	1	0	0	0	0	0	0	0
33	MF	(Morocco)	Mohamed Hamzaoui	0	0	0	0	0	0	0	0	0	0	0	0
34	FW	(Netherlands)	Abdoul Karim Sylla	0	0	0	0	0	0	0	0	0	0	0	0
35	DF	(France)	Vincent Di Stéfano	0	0	0	0	0	0	0	0	0	0	0	0
40	GK	(France)	Baptiste Valette	0	0	0	0	0	0	0	0	0	0	0	0
	FW	(France)	Alexandre Cropanese	0	0	0	0	0	0	0	0	0	0	0	0
