= Marco Estrada =

Marco Estrada may refer to:

- Marco Estrada (footballer)
- Marco Estrada (baseball)
