= Garry Bocaly =

French footballer (born 1988)

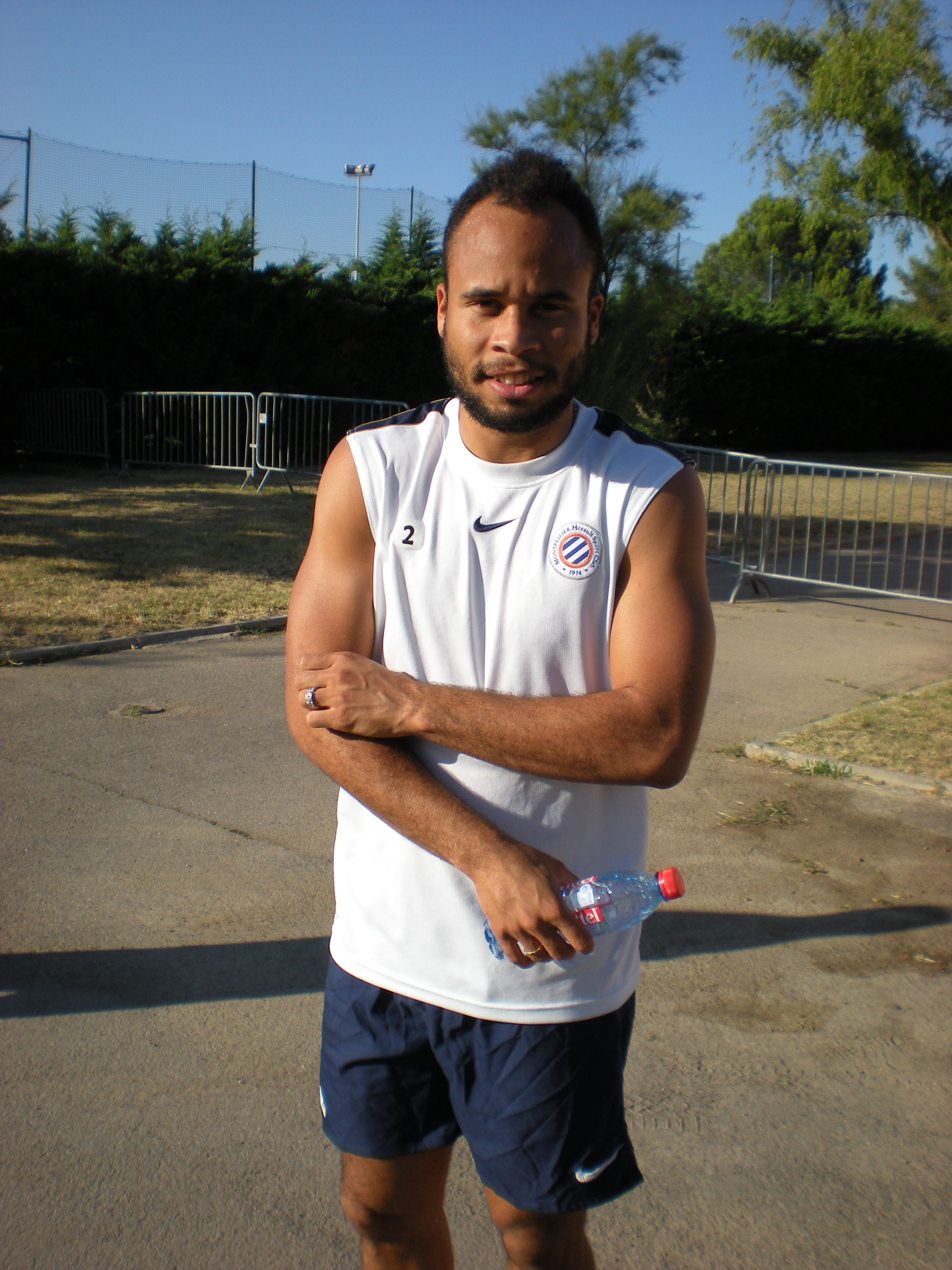
- Bocaly with Montpellier in 2012

Personal information
- Full name: Garry René Bertrand Bocaly
- Date of birth: 19 April 1988 (age 38)
- Place of birth: Schœlcher, Martinique, France
- Height: 1.80 m (5 ft 11 in)
- Position: Right back

Youth career
- 1995–2003: EV Les Trois Ilets
- 2003–2005: Marseille

Senior career*
Years	Team	Apps	(Gls)
2005–2010	Marseille	8	(0)
2007–2008	→ Libourne (loan)	29	(1)
2008–2009	→ Montpellier (loan)	35	(4)
2010	→ Montpellier (loan)	12	(0)
2010–2014	Montpellier	73	(3)
2014–2015	Arles-Avignon	10	(0)
2018–	L'Aiglon		

International career
2008–2010	France U21	14	(0)
- * Club domestic league appearances and goals

Garry René Bertrand Bocaly (born 19 April 1988) is a French former professional footballer who played as a right back.

== Club career ==
=== Olympique de Marseille ===
Bocaly was born in Schœlcher, Martinique. He began his football career at Marseille, joining in 2004 as a 15-year-old. While progressing through the youth system, he played in central defence and defensive midfield before settling in the right-back position.

Bocaly made his debut on 5 March 2006 against rivals Paris Saint-Germain in the annual Classique under bizarre circumstances. In protest against security flaws at the Parc des Princes, Marseille president Pape Diouf decided to use players from the club's youth academy and CFA2 reserve team in the match. Despite media expectations of heavy defeat, the youngsters held PSG to a goalless draw. Bocaly played the whole match, and fansite OMplanète thought him the player most likely to make a breakthrough. In April, he signed his first professional contract, of three years.

In the 2006–07 season, Bocaly was promoted to the senior squad as third-choice right back, behind Habib Beye and Renato Civelli. With Beye replacing the injured Civelli at centre back, Bocaly came into the starting eleven at right back for the visit to Nice in late October; he kept his place for three matches, all defeats, before dropping to the bench and then to the reserves. Head coach Albert Emon complimented his maturity, describing him as "one for the future".

==== Loan spells ====
With limited first-team opportunities at Marseille, Bocaly joined Libourne-Saint-Seurin of Ligue 2 on loan for the 2007–08 season. He had been linked with a similar move in the previous transfer window, but Emon would not allow it. Bocaly started in the opening game of the season, a 3–1 defeat at home to Montpellier, and was sent off in stoppage time for a bad tackle. On his return from suspension, he established himself as a regular starter, and scored his first senior goal on 24 September in a 3–2 loss against Nantes. In January 2008, his contract with Olympique Marseille was extended by three years, to run until 2012. He marked the event with a second dismissal of the season, after 20 minutes of the match against Châteauroux, in which Libourne still secured a 1–0 win to help their struggle to remain in Ligue 2. Bocaly finished the season with 29 league appearances, but his team's relegation to the third-tier Championnat National was confirmed with two games still to play.

Together with Marseille teammates Thomas Deruda and Jean-Philippe Sabo, Bocaly joined Ligue 2 club Montpellier on loan for the 2008–09 season. Bocaly made his debut in a 1–0 loss to Strasbourg on 4 August in which he was voted Montpellier's man of the match. He became a first-team regular, starting all but four of Montpellier's league matches, and scored four goals; his first for the club came on 22 August in a 4–0 win away to Reims, the fourth helped them beat Brest 3–2 in March to boost their promotion chances. Interviewed before an eventful final day of the season, facing a Strasbourg side needing a draw to secure promotion, Bocaly summed up the task ahead: "we don't have to think, we have to win!" They went 2–0 up after 20 minutes, then goalkeeper Johann Carrasso injured his knee saving a penalty and had to be replaced. Strasbourg scored just before half-time, and Montpellier held out through a tense second half and six minutes of stoppage time for a 2–1 win that confirmed a second-place finish, ahead of Boulogne on goal difference.

==== Return to Marseille ====
Bocaly returned to Marseille's first-team squad under new manager Didier Deschamps, but was injured in pre-season and warned that he would need to be patient, with Laurent Bonnart established as first choice at right back. It took until 31 October for him to play his first game of the season, starting at right back in a 1–1 draw with Toulouse. According to Foot 365's report, he struggled defensively but was positive going forward, and was involved with Brandão's equalising goal. Deschamps introduced him into the team for Toulouse to get him used to the position because Bonnart was suspended for the Champions League group stage fixture three days later. Bocaly duly made his Champions League debut in the 6–1 win against FC Zürich; he played the whole match, and produced what UEFA's match reporter called an "exquisite sliding tackle" with his goalkeeper beaten to deny the opponents a second goal. Bonnart was preferred for the next league match, and Bocaly made just four Ligue 1 appearances before returning to Montpellier on loan in January 2010.

=== Return to Montpellier ===
On 28 January 2010, Bocaly returned to Montpellier on loan to the end of the season, with an option to purchase. Illness delayed his second Montpellier debut until 13 February, when he started in a 1–0 win over Grenoble. Surgery on a broken hand kept him out until 7 March, when he returned to action as a late substitute against Bordeaux. He made twelve appearances by the end of the season, helping Montpellier finish fifth in the league and qualify for the 2010–11 UEFA Europa League.

Montpeller took up their option to sign Bocaly on a permanent basis. His opening-day performance against Bordeaux, in which his headed goal, his first in Ligue 1, won the match, earned him a place in L'Équipe's Team of the Week, and he helped the team go through August without conceding a goal. He was yellow-carded on 28 August for an offence that was retrospectively ruled to have been serious foul play, and received a two-match ban plus a suspended one-match ban. He returned to the starting lineup in a 2–0 win over Sochaux on 16 October. After missing a month with a thigh problem, he returned as a late substitute on 4 January and fit to start against hot favourites Paris St Germain (PSG) in the semi-final of the Coupe de la Ligue, a competition in which Montpellier had never reached the final. The match was goalless when PSG's Clément Chantôme was sent off for a heavy tackle on Bocaly after 88 minutes; in the last minutes of extra time, Olivier Giroud headed home to take Montpellier through to face Olympique Marseille at the Stade de France. The Final was disappointing for club and player: the only goal came after Bocaly fouled Mathieu Valbuena, the resulting free kick was partly cleared, and Taye Taiwo shot home.

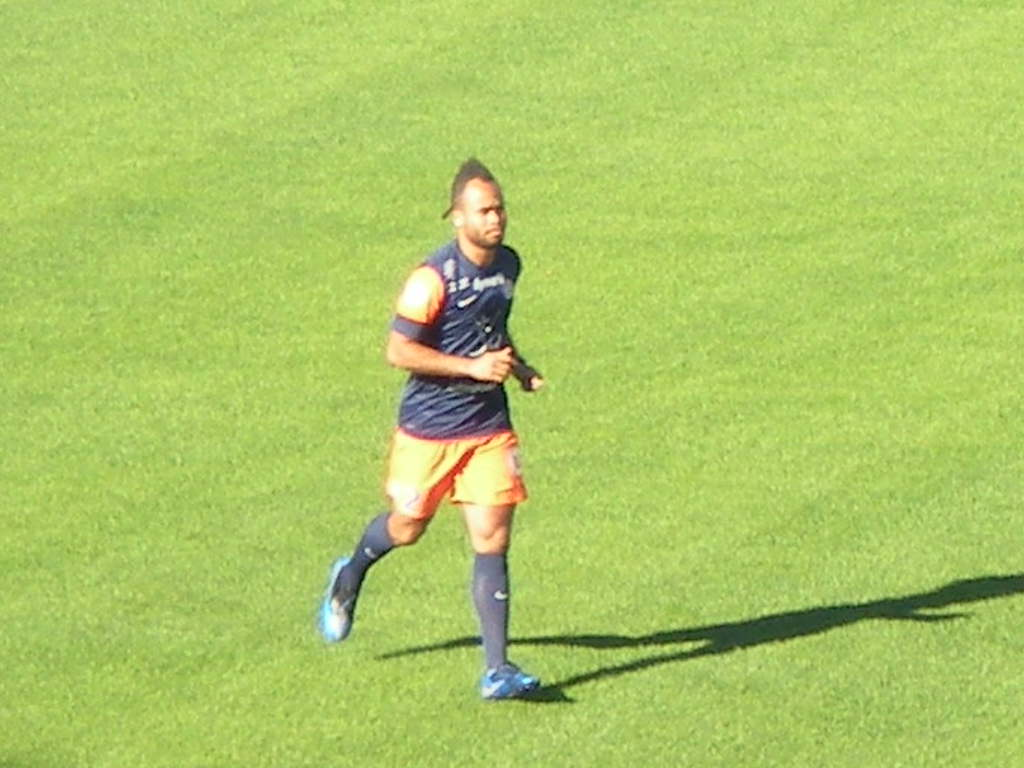
Bocaly playing for Montpellier in 2012

When available – as well as his mid-season injury, a lack of discipline brought a series of suspensions – Bocaly was a regular in the starting eleven; he finished with 31 appearances in all competitions. He scored twice more: he "found the bottom corner from the edge of the area and could not have caught it any better, with the ball fizzing, staying at a constant height above the ground" to complete a 2–1 win at Nancy at the end of January and produced a "spectacular long-range strike" in Montpellier's heaviest home defeat of the season, against Lens in March. The league season ended badly for Montpellier: one win in the last nine matches left them 14th, just three points clear of relegation.

Head coach René Girard saw Bocaly as a right-sided defender who liked to go forward; he was certainly productive at both ends of the pitch in the early part of the 2011–12 season. While helping the defence keep three clean sheets in the first five matches, he set up Montpellier's second goal of a 3–1 win over Auxerre in the opening game, was fouled for a penalty to open the scoring in a 4–0 defeat of Rennes on matchday three, and crossed for Souleymane Camara to score the only goal against Nice on matchday five. In the first half of the season, after which they lay second in the table, three points behind big-spending Paris Saint-Germain, who reportedly paid €6 million more for one player than Montpellier's entire €36m budget. Bocaly started 13 of the 19 matches; in the second half, all but one. A run of four wins in January and February without conceding a goal – in the second of which, against Nice, Bocaly assisted Giroud's last-minute winner – took them top, at least until PSG played their game in hand. They remained contenders. At the beginning of April, Bocaly told the press he thought the title race was between Montpellier, PSG and Lille, the reigning champions; with two matches left, this was still the case, but a stoppage-time winner against Lille left Montpellier needing only to draw at Auxerre, whose relegation was already confirmed. Bocaly said it would be difficult, but he had "every faith in the spirit of this team to be champions". His faith was justified: against a background of home supporters protesting by throwing tennis balls, toilet rolls and firecrackers onto the pitch, causing twenty minutes' worth of delays, a 2–1 win confirmed Montpellier's first ever league title.

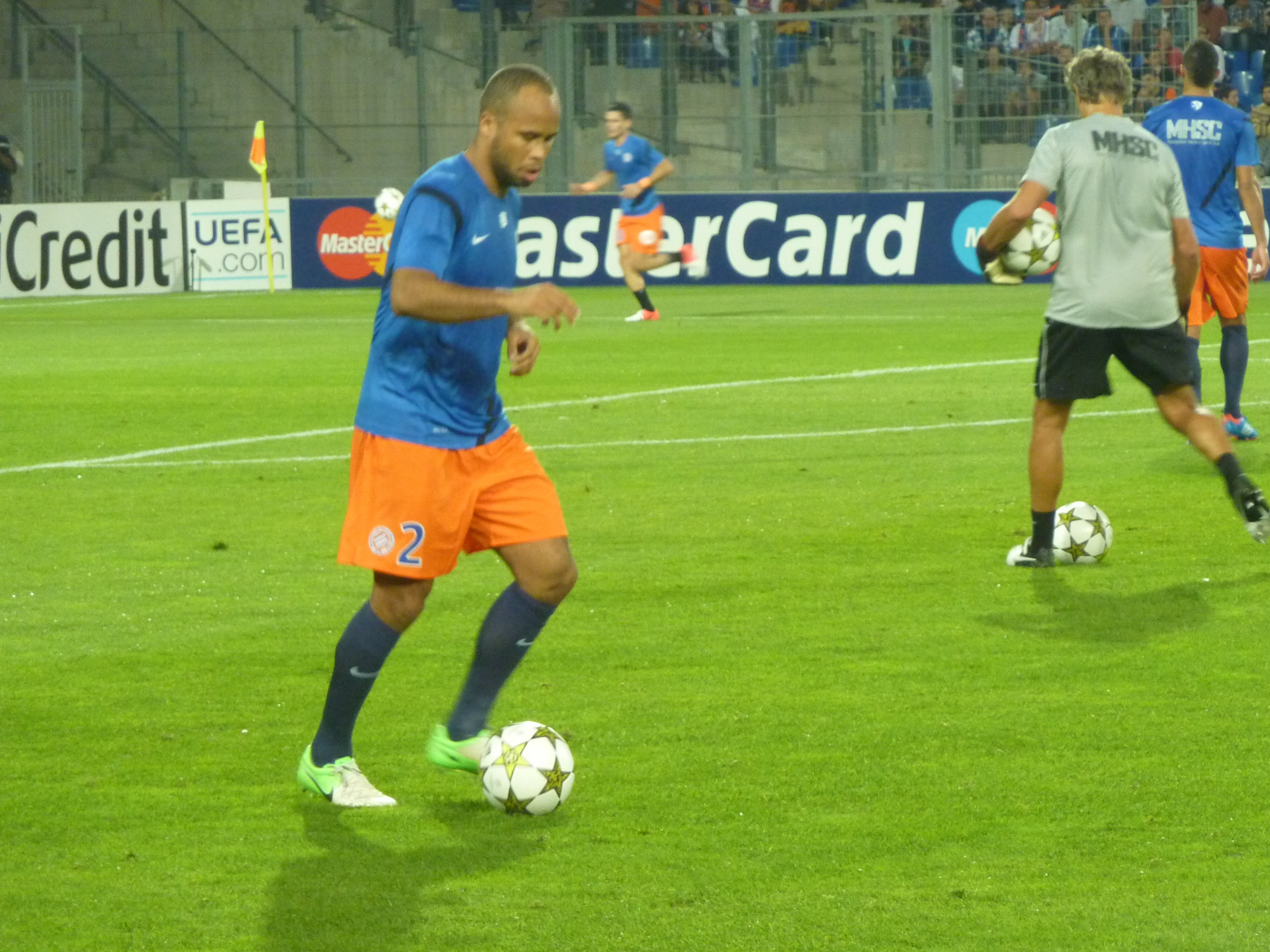
Bocaly warming up before facing Arsenal in September 2012

A thigh injury in pre-season training meant Bocaly did not return to action until 1 September 2012 against Sochaux. He was in the starting eleven for Montpellier's debut in Champions League football, a 2–1 loss at home to Arsenal in the group stage, and was voted man of the match on his next league appearance, a 2–0 win away to Nancy in which the defence were returning to last season's form. Four days later, Bocaly was sent off for a foul that gave away a penalty and left Schalke's Julian Draxler with a broken arm; his team drew the game to earn their first Champions League point. He was again sent off at the end of October for a professional foul on Nice's Neal Maupay in what was Montpellier's first home win of the season.

In mid-November, Bocaly injured a hip; he underwent surgery in March 2013 which put an end to his season. A thigh injury in September delayed his recuperation, and more damage to the thigh put paid to a proposed return to the reserves in November. He finally returned to the first team on 11 April 2014, when he started and completed a 3–2 loss at home to his former club, Olympique Marseille. He played the first half in central defence before switching to right back after the break, and said that despite the disappointing result, it was a great delight to be back after 516 days out. He played twice more, and was released at the end of the season.

In a bitter interview with L'Équipe soon afterwards, Bocaly criticised the Montpellier club. He claimed that after its medical staff were unable to treat his hip problem, he had to source his own treatment at his own expense; that he was prepared to accept a contract extension on reduced terms, but then read in the press that he was being released; and that interest from other clubs was discouraged by rumours that he was no longer able to perform at a high level.

=== Arles-Avignon ===
In July 2014, Bocaly signed for Ligue 2 club Arles-Avignon. He quickly established himself in the starting eleven before his role in a post-match fracas against Nîmes earned him a three-match ban. He played just once more before an attack of appendicitis developed into peritonitis that cost him ten days in hospital, 10 kg (22 lb) of bodyweight, and came close to costing him his life. He returned to action in December, playing in eight more matches, but he had returned too soon, before his muscles had fully recovered from the operation, and the inflammation in his hip became intolerable. He underwent successful hip surgery in May 2015, but two weeks needed a second appendectomy on tissue not removed in the original operation. Bocaly regained fitness and resumed training with Championnat National (third-tier) club AS Béziers. Interviewed in March 2016, he was keen to get back into professional football, and believed it would be possible. By December, he had accepted that his health issues had done too much damage, and announced his retirement from football, without regrets.

=== Return to Martinique ===
He remained in football as an organiser of training camps for professional clubs, and became involved in a business marketing sparkling rum. In 2018, he resumed playing football as an amateur with Martinique Championnat National club Aiglon du Lamentin, and helped them to become the only overseas team reach the last 64 of the 2018–19 Coupe de France, in which they took Ligue 2 opponents Orléans to extra time before losing 3–2. He held ambitions of opening a soccer school to give youngsters in his native Martinique the opportunities that he had to find in mainland France, and in August 2019, he was appointed director of Paris Saint-Germain's youth academy in the country.

== International career ==
Bocaly has appeared with all of France's youth teams beginning with the under-16s all the way to the under-21s.

He was a member of the under-19 squad that reached the semi-finals at the 2007 UEFA European Under-19 Championship.

Bocaly earned his first cap with the under-21 squad on 26 March 2008, in a match against the Czech Republic. The following year, he was called up by the under-21 squad for the Toulon Tournament in France. Bocaly helped the side reach the final, which they lost 1–0 against Chile. Bocaly made fourteen appearances for the under-21 side.

Bocaly spoke out about his possible call up from the national team for the UEFA Euro 2012 and later said in another interview that he was eligible to play for Martinique, where his family were from.

== Personal life ==
Bocaly is married and has two children, born in 2012 and 2014.

== Career statistics ==
All statistics are sourced to Soccerway except where individually noted.

Appearances and goals by club, season and competition
Club	Season	League			Coupe de France		Coupe de la Ligue		Other		Total	
Club	Season	Division	Apps	Goals	Apps	Goals	Apps	Goals	Apps	Goals	Apps	Goals
Olympique de Marseille	2005–06	Ligue 1	1	0	0	0	0	0	0	0	1	0
Olympique de Marseille	2006–07	Ligue 1	3	0	0	0	0	0	0	0	3	0
Olympique de Marseille	2009–10	Ligue 1	4	0	1	0	0	0	1 (Note: Appearance(s) in UEFA Champions League)	0	6	0
Olympique de Marseille	Total		8	0	1	0	0	0	1	0	10	0
Libourne (loan)	2007–08	Ligue 2	29	1	2	0	0	0	—		31	1
Montpellier (loan)	2008–09	Ligue 2	35	4	2	0	0	0	—		37	4
Montpellier (loan)	2009–10	Ligue 1	12	0	—		—		—		12	0
Montpellier	2010–11	Ligue 1	29	3	0	0	2	0	0	0	31	3
Montpellier	2011–12	Ligue 1	34	0	1	0	2	0	—		37	0
Montpellier	2012–13	Ligue 1	7	0	0	0	0	0	3	0	10	0
Montpellier	2013–14	Ligue 1	3	0	0	0	0	0	—		3	0
Montpellier	Total		120	7	3	0	4	0	3	0	130	7
Arles-Avignon	2014–15	Ligue 2	10	0	2	0	3	0	—		15	0
Career total			167	8	8	0	7	0	4	0	286	8
