= Adrien Coulomb =

French professional footballer (born 1990)

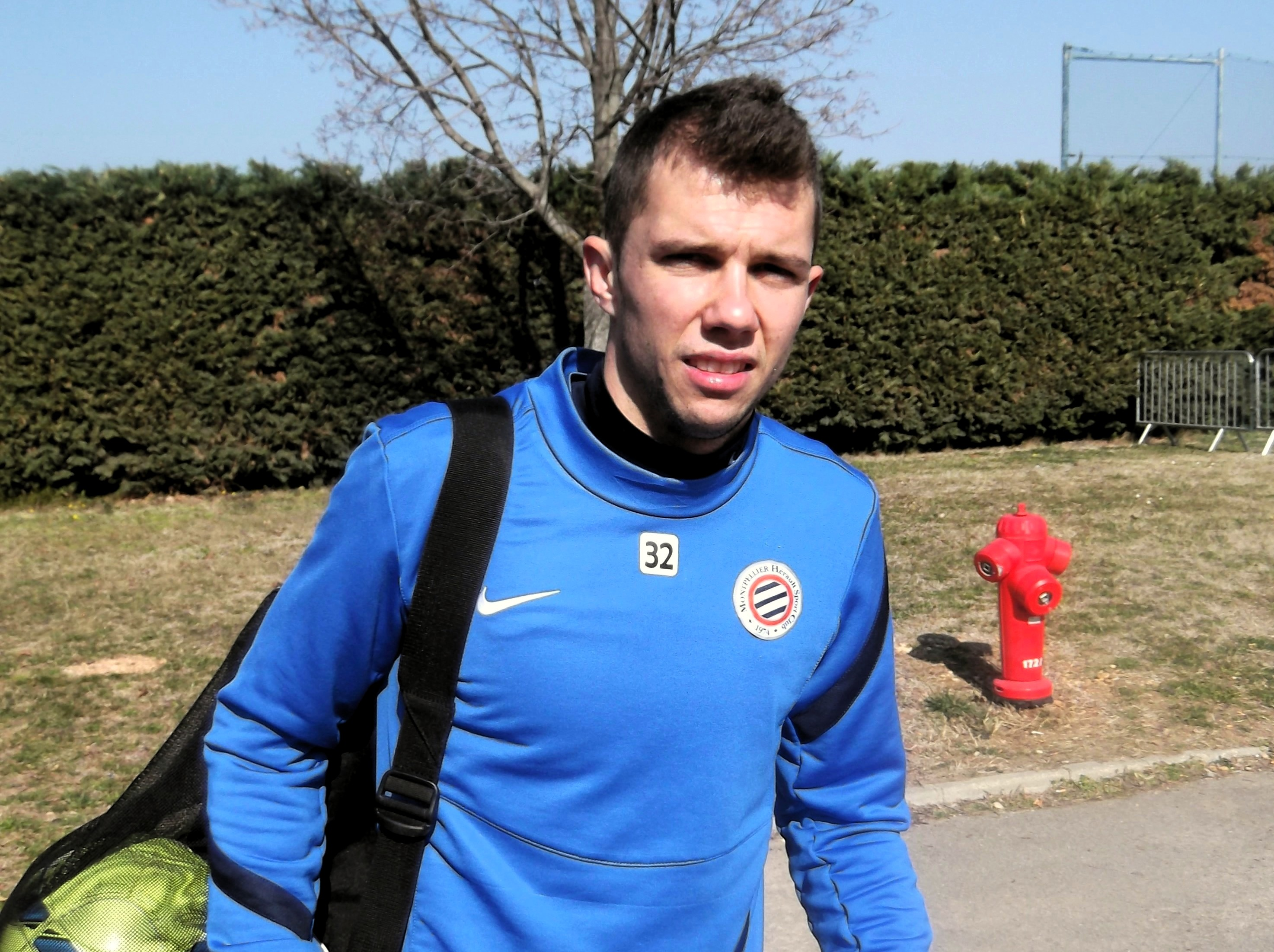
- Adrien Coulomb 2013

Personal information
- Date of birth: 4 October 1990 (age 36)
- Place of birth: Marseille, France
- Height: 1.77 m (5 ft 10 in)
- Position: Attacking midfielder

Team information
- Current team: Marignane Gignac
- Number: 10

Youth career
- 2003–2010: Montpellier

Senior career*
Years	Team	Apps	(Gls)
2010–2013	Montpellier	0	(0)
2011–2012	→ Vannes (loan)	0	(0)
2013–2015	Arles-Avignon	23	(1)
2016–	Marignane Gignac	77	(9)
- * Club domestic league appearances and goals as of 20:37, 19 January 2020 (UTC)

Adrien Coulomb (born 4 October 1990) is a French professional footballer who plays as a midfielder for Marignane Gignac.

== Club career ==
Coulomb made his professional debut in October 2013, in a 1–0 Ligue 2 defeat against Istres.
