= Mapou Yanga-Mbiwa =

French footballer (born 1989)

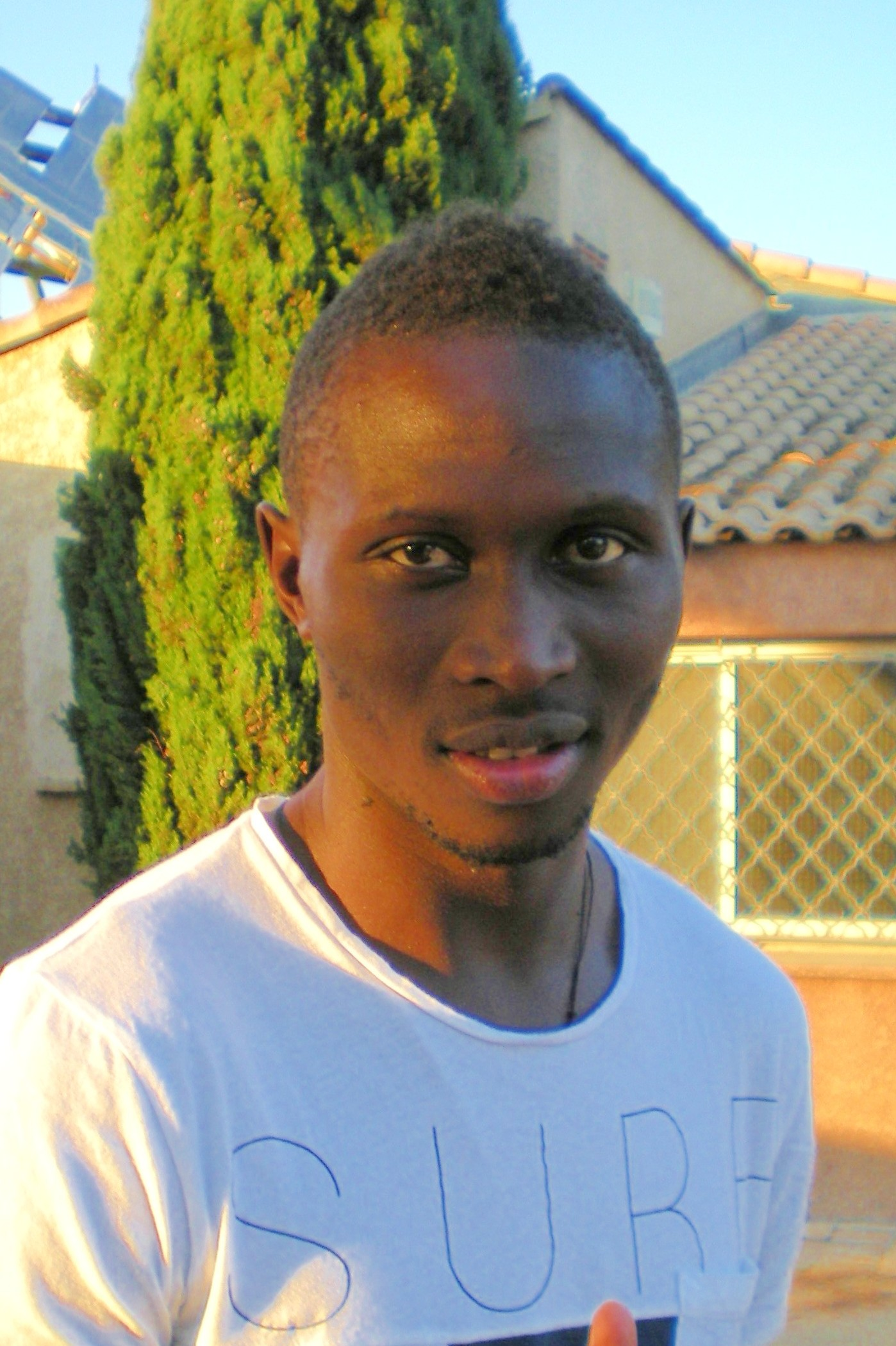
- Yanga-Mbiwa in 2012

Personal information
- Full name: Mapou Nzapali Yanga-Mbiwa
- Date of birth: 15 May 1989 (age 37)
- Place of birth: Bangui, Central African Republic
- Height: 1.84 m (6 ft 0 in)
- Position: Centre-back

Youth career
- 2005–2007: Montpellier

Senior career*
Years	Team	Apps	(Gls)
2007–2013	Montpellier	186	(4)
2013–2014	Newcastle United	37	(0)
2014–2015	Roma	28	(1)
2015–2020	Lyon	54	(2)
2024–2025	FC Istres	20	(0)
2025–	Maccabi Marseille	10	(1)

International career
2009–2010	France U21	5	(1)
2012–2014	France	4	(0)
- * Club domestic league appearances and goals as of 02:01, 27 July 2026 (UTC)

Mapou Nzapali Yanga-Mbiwa (born 15 May 1989) is a French professional footballer who plays as a centre-back.

== Early life and career ==
Yanga-Mbiwa was born in Bangui, Central African Republic, but moved to France as an eight-year-old, growing up in Port-de-Bouc, Bouches-du-Rhône, not far from Marseille.

== Club career ==
=== Montpellier ===
Yanga-Mbiwa joined Montpellier as a youth player in 2005 and made his professional football debut on 23 February 2007 in a 1–0 away defeat to Bastia starting the match and playing the entire 90 minutes, picking up a yellow card. Following the season, he signed his first professional contract agreeing to a three-year deal until 2010. He was officially promoted to the senior squad and was assigned the number 3 shirt.

Initially, Yanga-Mbiwa was utilised as a substitute earlier on during the 2007–08 season, but by September 2007, despite being only 18 years old, Montpellier manager Rolland Courbis named Yanga-Mbiwa a starter for the rest of the 2007–08 season. Yanga-Mbiwa didn't disappoint appearing in 41 total matches scoring one goal. Beginning with the club's 31 August 1–0 victory over Ajaccio, Mbiwa appeared in every match Montpellier played including the Coupe de la Ligue and Coupe de France matches, where Montpellier reached the Round of 16 and Round of 32, respectively. His only goal of the season came on 12 May 2008 against FC Gueugnon scoring the winner in injury time to give Montpellier a 2–1 victory.

Already established as a regular, Yanga-Mbiwa was an incumbent starter heading into the 2008–09 season, and despite competition from fellow youngsters Mickaël Nelson and Abdel El Kaoutari, he continually impressed appearing in 33 total matches and scoring one goal against Angers in a 3–3 draw again in injury time. The equalising goal came only seconds after Angers took the lead with a goal from Malik Couturier. On 20 March 2009, with Montpellier in a decisive battle for promotion, Yanga-Mbiwa picked up an extensive injury against Brest, which ruled him out for almost two months. He returned to the team on 8 May 2009 and played the final four matches helping Montpellier achieve promotion to Ligue 1 on the final day of the season.

Despite promotion to Ligue 1, with his impending stint in prison oncoming, manager Rolland Courbis resigned from his position and new manager René Girard came on. Girard made it clear that one of his many priorities were to keep hold of Yanga-Mbiwa and on 2 June 2009, it was done with the club signing the player to a two-year contract extension until 2012. Yanga-Mbiwa made his Ligue 1 debut in the club's opening match of the season against Paris Saint-Germain playing the entire match in a 1–1 draw. On 12 May 2010, Yanga-Mbiwa added an extra year to his contract after agreeing to a contract extension with the club.

=== Newcastle United ===
On 22 January 2013, Yanga-Mbiwa completed a transfer to Newcastle United for £8.5 million. He agreed to a five-and-a-half-year deal at St James' Park, where he wore the number 13 shirt. He made his début for Newcastle on 29 January 2013 as a second-half substitute in a 2–1 win against Aston Villa.

=== Roma ===
On 1 September 2014, Yanga-Mbiwa signed for Italian club Roma on a season-long loan, with an option to make the move permanent for £5.5m on top of the £1m loan fee. He made his debut as a 77th-minute substitute in the Champions League match against CSKA Moscow on 17 September. Four days later, he played in his first Serie A match, starting in a 2–0 win over Cagliari. On 27 January 2015, Newcastle United announced that Yanga-Mbiwa would join Roma on a permanent deal after meeting a contractual condition contained in the loan agreement between the clubs.

On 25 May 2015, Yanga-Mbiwa scored his only goal with Roma and the winning goal against club's rival Lazio during the Derby della Capitale in a 2-1 win, which ensured a 2nd-placed finish in the 2014–15 Serie A season as well as earning a start in the 2015–16 UEFA Champions League.

=== Lyon ===
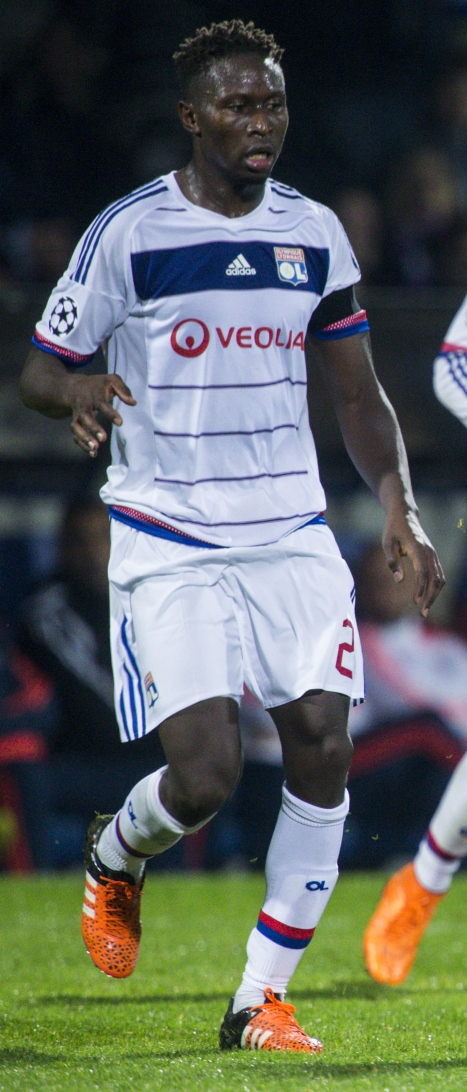
Yanga-Mbiwa playing for Lyon in 2015

On 14 August 2015, Yanga-Mbiwa completed a transfer to French club Lyon for €8 million with possible €2 million bonus fee. On 8 May he scored two to help take Lyon past Monaco, ending his first season with two goals. He terminated his contract with Lyon on the 1 July 2020 with 72 matches played and 2 goals scored for the club in 5 years.

== International career ==
Yanga-Mbiwa has dual citizenship with both France and the Central African Republic meaning he is eligible to represent both. He was also eligible to play for Cameroon. He did not appear on either nation's youth team, but on 1 October 2009, he was called up to the France under-21 team by coach Erick Mombaerts for their 2011 UEFA European Under-21 Championship qualification matches against Malta on 9 October and Belgium on 13 October. On 15 May 2012, Yanga-Mbiwa had been named to France's preliminary squad for UEFA Euro 2012. However, on 29 May, coach Laurent Blanc announced his final squad and Yanga-Mbiwa was not included.

== Career statistics ==
=== Club ===
As of match played 13 December 2017

Appearances and goals by club, season and competition
Club	Season	League			National Cup		League Cup		Continental		Other		Total	
Club	Season	Division	Apps	Goals	Apps	Goals	Apps	Goals	Apps	Goals	Apps	Goals	Apps	Goals
Montpellier	2006–07	Ligue 2	1	0	0	0	0	0	—		—		1	0
Montpellier	2007–08	Ligue 2	34	1	4	0	3	0	—		—		41	1
Montpellier	2008–09	Ligue 2	29	1	1	0	3	0	—		—		33	1
Montpellier	2009–10	Ligue 1	36	0	1	0	0	0	—		—		37	0
Montpellier	2010–11	Ligue 1	36	1	0	0	4	0	2 (Note: Appearances in UEFA Europa League)	0	—		42	1
Montpellier	2011–12	Ligue 1	34	1	2	0	2	0	—		—		38	1
Montpellier	2012–13	Ligue 1	16	0	1	0	2	0	6 (Note: Appearances in UEFA Champions League)	0	1 (Note: Appearance in Trophée des Champions)	0	27	0
Montpellier	Total		186	4	9	0	14	0	8	0	1	0	219	4
Newcastle United	2012–13	Premier League	14	0	0	0	0	0	6	0	—		20	0
Newcastle United	2013–14	Premier League	23	0	2	0	1	0	—		—		26	0
Newcastle United	Total		37	0	2	0	1	0	6	0	0	0	46	0
Roma	2014–15	Serie A	28	1	1	0	0	0	9	0	—		38	1
Lyon	2015–16	Ligue 1	27	2	1	0	2	0	5	0	—		35	2
Lyon	2016–17	Ligue 1	25	0	1	0	0	0	7 (Note: Five appearances in UEFA Champions League, two appearances in UEFA Europa League)	0	1	0	34	0
Lyon	2017–18	Ligue 1	2	0	0	0	1	0	0	0	—		3	0
Lyon	2018–19	Ligue 1	0	0	0	0	0	0	0	0	—		0	0
Lyon	2019–20	Ligue 1	0	0	0	0	0	0	0	0	—		0	0
Lyon	Total		54	2	2	0	3	0	12	0	1	0	72	2
Career total			331	9	15	0	20	0	40	0	2	0	410	9

=== International ===
Appearances and goals by national team and year
National team	Year	Apps	Goals
France	2012	3	0
France	2014	1	0
Total		4	0

== Honours ==
Montpellier

- Ligue 1: 2011–12
