= Romain Pitau =

French footballer (born 1977)

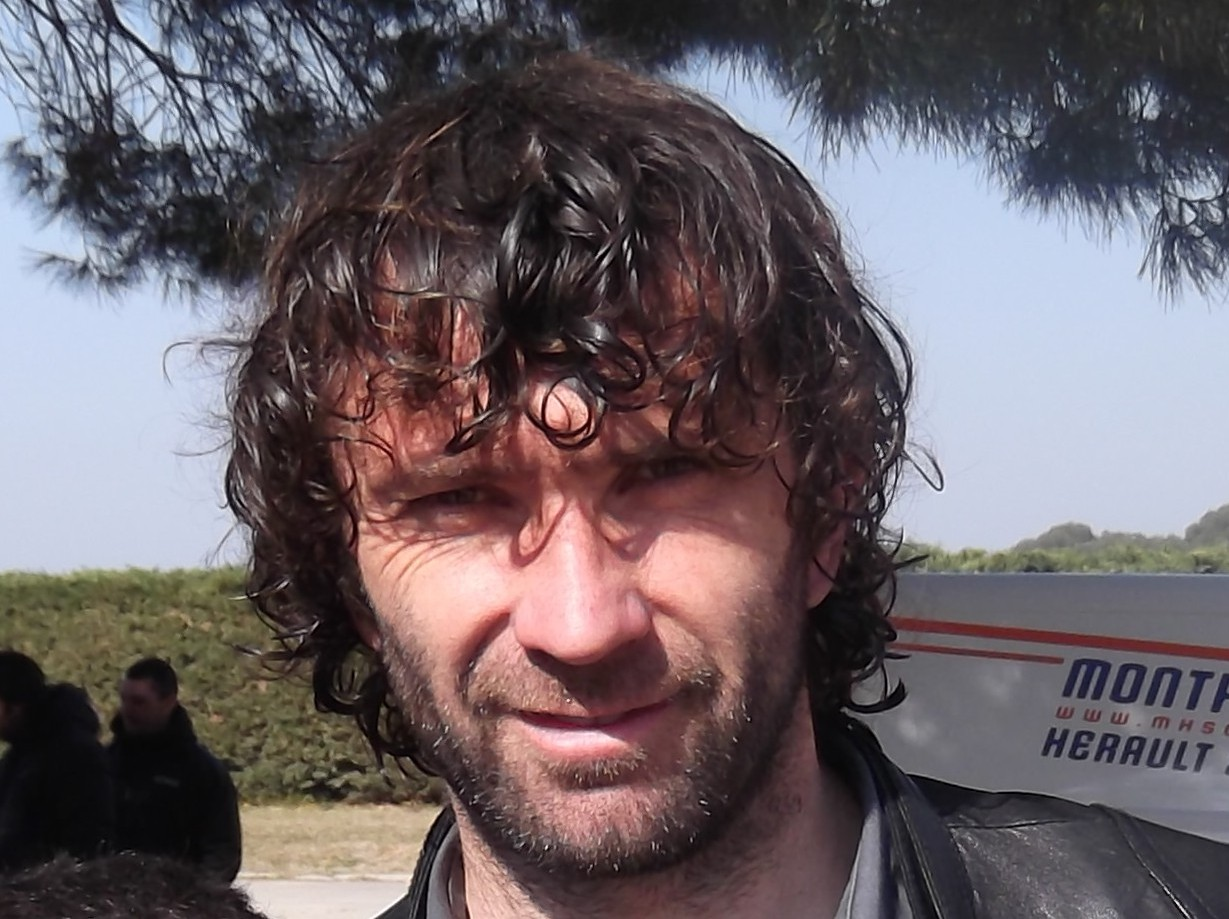
- Pitau in 2013

Personal information
- Date of birth: 8 August 1977 (age 49)
- Place of birth: Douai, France
- Height: 1.78 m (5 ft 10 in)
- Position: Midfielder

Youth career
- Lens

Senior career*
Years	Team	Apps	(Gls)
1997–1998	Lens	2	(0)
1998–2001	Créteil	102	(5)
2001–2004	Nice	103	(5)
2004–2009	Sochaux	172	(5)
2009–2013	Montpellier	92	(0)
Total		471	(15)

Managerial career
- 2022–2023: Montpellier
- 2024–2025: Olympiacos U19
- 2025: Olympiacos B
- * Club domestic league appearances and goals

Romain Pitau (born 8 August 1977) is a French professional football manager and former player who played as a midfielder.

== Managerial career ==
Pitau was appointed manager of Ligue 1 club Montpellier in November 2022.

== Managerial statistics ==
As of match played 1 December 2025

Managerial record by team and tenure
Team	From	To	Record							
Team	From	To	G	W	D	L	GF	GA	GD	Win %
Montpellier	17 October 2022	7 February 2023	12	2	2	8	11	25	−14	16.67
Olympiacos U19	7 August 2024	21 July 2025	37	31	3	3	109	26	+83	83.78
Olympiacos B	21 July 2025	1 December 2025	10	4	2	4	13	16	−3	40.00
Total			59	37	7	15	133	67	+66	62.71

== Honours ==
Lens

- Ligue 1: 1997–98

Montpellier

- Ligue 1: 2011–12

Sochaux

- Coupe de France: 2007
