= Karim Aït-Fana =

Footballer (born 1989)

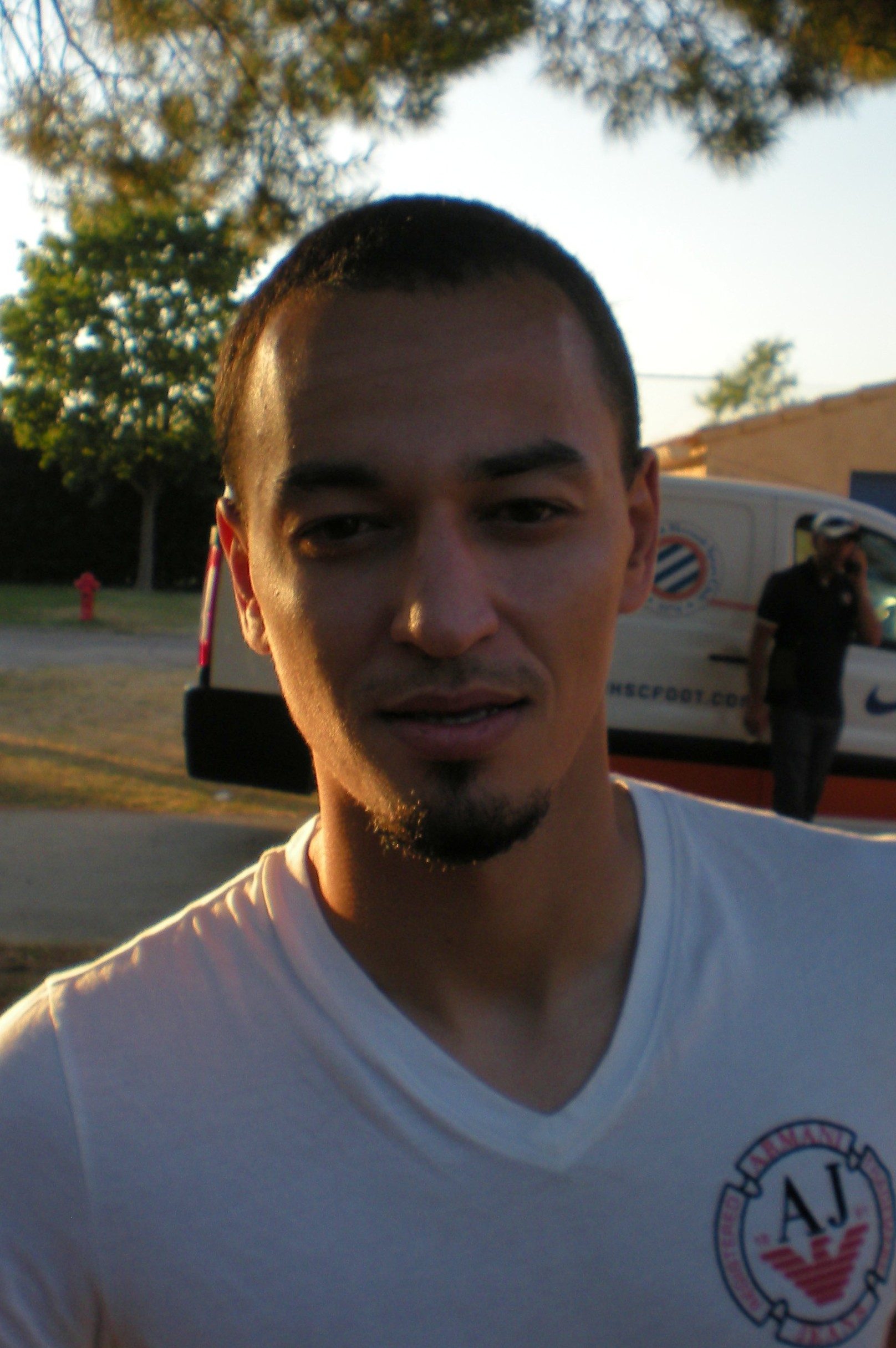
- Aït-Fana in 2012

Personal information
- Date of birth: 25 February 1989 (age 37)
- Place of birth: Limoges, France
- Height: 1.75 m (5 ft 9 in)
- Position: Winger

Youth career
- 1995–1997: Air Limoges
- 1997–2002: AS Saint-Louis
- 2002–2004: IFR Châteauroux
- 2003–2004: Limoges
- 2004–2006: Montpellier

Senior career*
Years	Team	Apps	(Gls)
2006–2016	Montpellier	149	(17)
2016–2017	Nîmes	23	(0)
2017–2018	GS Consolat	3	(0)
2018	Wydad Casablanca	0	(0)
2019	Gallia Lucciana	8	(0)
Total		183	(17)

International career
2004–2005	France U16	4	(0)
2005–2006	France U17	3	(0)
2006–2007	France U18	6	(1)
2007–2008	France U19	3	(0)
2009–2010	France U21	5	(1)
2012–2017	Morocco	3	(0)
- * Club domestic league appearances and goals

Karim Aït-Fana (Arabic: كاريم ايت-فانا; born 25 February 1989) is a former professional footballer who played as a winger. Having represented his birth country of France at various youth levels, he made three appearances for the Morocco national team.

== Club career ==
=== Montpellier ===
Aït-Fana was born in Limoges and began his career playing for his local club, Air Limoges. At the age of thirteen, he was selected to attend the Centre fédéral de préformation de Châteauroux, a regional youth academy that is comparable to that of the Clairefontaine academy, in order to receive further training. While training at Châteauroux during the week, he played with hometown club Limoges FC on the weekends. After spending two years at the academy, he joined Montpellier.

Aït-Fana made his professional football debut on 12 May 2006, the final match day of the 2005–06 season, coming on as a late-match substitute playing nine minutes in a 1–0 loss to Le Havre. The following season, his playing time increased to 13 matches. He also scored his first goal during this season on 27 April 2007 against LB Châteauroux in a 3–1 defeat. Aït-Fana's role in the team was greatly expanded for the 2007–08 season as he appeared in 37 total matches. He scored his only two goals for the season in the final league match of the season against FC Libourne-Saint-Seurin, which Montpellier won 5–0.

Montpellier earned promotion to Ligue 1 following the club's successful campaign during the 2008–09 season with Aït-Fana having an influential role. He scored a career-high six goals during the campaign including the winner against Guingamp late in the season with the club in the midst of a promotion battle. Due to his successful season, Aït-Fana was given a contract extension with the club until the year 2012. In his first season with Montpellier in Ligue 1, Aït-Fana was a revelation in the team, which reached as high as second position in the league. He has scored impressive goals against Sochaux, Boulogne, Le Mans, and Marseille. Montpellier went undefeated in the five league matches Aït-Fana has scored in.

In Montpellier's last home game of the 2011–12 campaign, Aït-Fana scored a last minute goal in a 1–0 win over Lille after coming off the bench.

=== Consolat GS ===
In early January 2018, Aït-Fana left Championnat National side GS Consolat.

=== Wydad Casablanca ===
In late January, Aït-Fana joined reigning African champions Wydad AC, agreeing a 1.5-year deal. In August 2018 he revealed that few days after signing the contract, he learned that his contract was not certified for an administrative history and he then went back to France.

=== Gallia Lucciana ===
In January 2019, Aït-Fana joined Gallia Club Lucciana in the Championnat National 3.

By March 2020, he had retired from playing and taken up refereeing.

== International career ==
Aït-Fana has been active on the international youth circuit for France. He has earned limited caps with the under-16s, under-17s, under-18s, and the under U-19 squad. After not representing France for over a year and a half, it was speculated that he would follow in the footsteps on fellow French-born Moroccan Marouane Chamakh and play for Morocco, his country of origin. However, on 1 October 2009, he was called up to the France under-21 team by coach Erick Mombaerts for their 2011 UEFA European Under-21 Football Championship qualification matches against Malta on 9 October and Belgium on 13 October. He made his debut in the Malta match appearing as a substitute in the 76th minute. Despite being on the pitch for mere seconds, he scored France's second goal of the match ensuring them a 2–0 victory.

Aït-Fana made his debut with the national team of Morocco in a friendly match against Senegal held on 25 May in Marrakech.

== Style of play ==
Aït-Fana could play in a variety of attacking positions, which include playing in the hole, as a winger, and in the attacking midfield position.

== Personal life ==
Aït-Fana's father is from Azrou and his mother is from Meknes. He is Muslim.

== Career statistics ==
=== Club ===
Appearances and goals by club, season and competition
Club	Season	League			Cup (Note: Includes Coupe de France, Coupe de la Ligue, Trophée des Champions)		Europe (Note: Includes UEFA Europa League, UEFA Champions League)		Total	
Club	Season	Division	Apps	Goals	Apps	Goals	Apps	Goals	Apps	Goals
Montpellier	2005–06	Ligue 2	1	0	0	0	0	0	1	0
Montpellier	2006–07	Ligue 2	13	1	0	0	0	0	13	1
Montpellier	2007–08	Ligue 2	31	2	6	0	0	0	37	2
Montpellier	2008–09	Ligue 2	29	6	2	0	0	0	31	6
Montpellier	2009–10	Ligue 1	33	5	2	2	0	0	35	7
Montpellier	2010–11	Ligue 1	19	0	4	0	2	0	25	0
Montpellier	2011–12	Ligue 1	11	2	4	0	0	0	15	2
Montpellier	2012–13	Ligue 1	8	0	0	0	2	1	10	1
Montpellier	2013–14	Ligue 1	4	1	0	0	0	0	4	1
Montpellier	Total		149	17	20	2	4	1	173	20
Montpellier B	2014–15	CFA	1	0	0	0	0	0	1	0
Nîmes	2016–17	Ligue 2	23	0	1	0	0	0	24	0
Consolat Marseille	2017–18	Championnat National	3	0	1	0	0	0	4	0
Career total			176	17	22	2	4	1	202	20

== Honours ==
Montpellier

- Ligue 1: 2011–12
