= Jamel Saihi =

Footballer (born 1987)

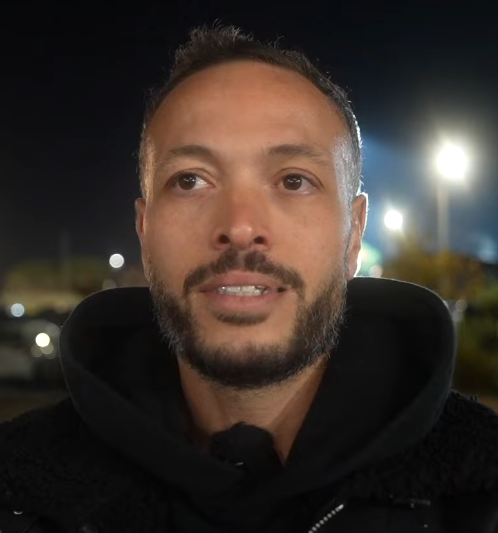
- Saihi in 2024

Personal information
- Full name: Jamel Saihi
- Date of birth: January 21, 1987 (age 39)
- Place of birth: Montpellier, France
- Height: 1.81 m (5 ft 11 1/2 in)
- Position: Defensive midfielder

Youth career
- 1995–1999: FC Mas Prunet
- 1999–2000: FC Lavérune
- 2000–2007: Montpellier

Senior career*
Years	Team	Apps	(Gls)
2007–2016	Montpellier	172	(1)
2016–2017	Angers	5	(0)
Total		177	(1)

International career
2008–2016	Tunisia	19	(2)
- * Club domestic league appearances and goals

Jamel Saihi (born 27 January 1987) is a former professional footballer who plays as a defensive midfielder. He previously spent 16 years at Montpellier, with whom he won the 2011-12 Ligue 1 title.

== International goals ==
#	Date	Venue	Opponent	Score	Result	Competition
1.	11 February 2009	Stade 7 November, Radès, Tunisia	Netherlands	1 – 1	1 – 1	Friendly
2.	27 May 2012	Stade Mustapha Ben Jannet, Monastir, Tunisia	Rwanda	5 – 1	5 – 1	Friendly
