= Marco Estrada (footballer) =

Chilean footballer (born 1983)

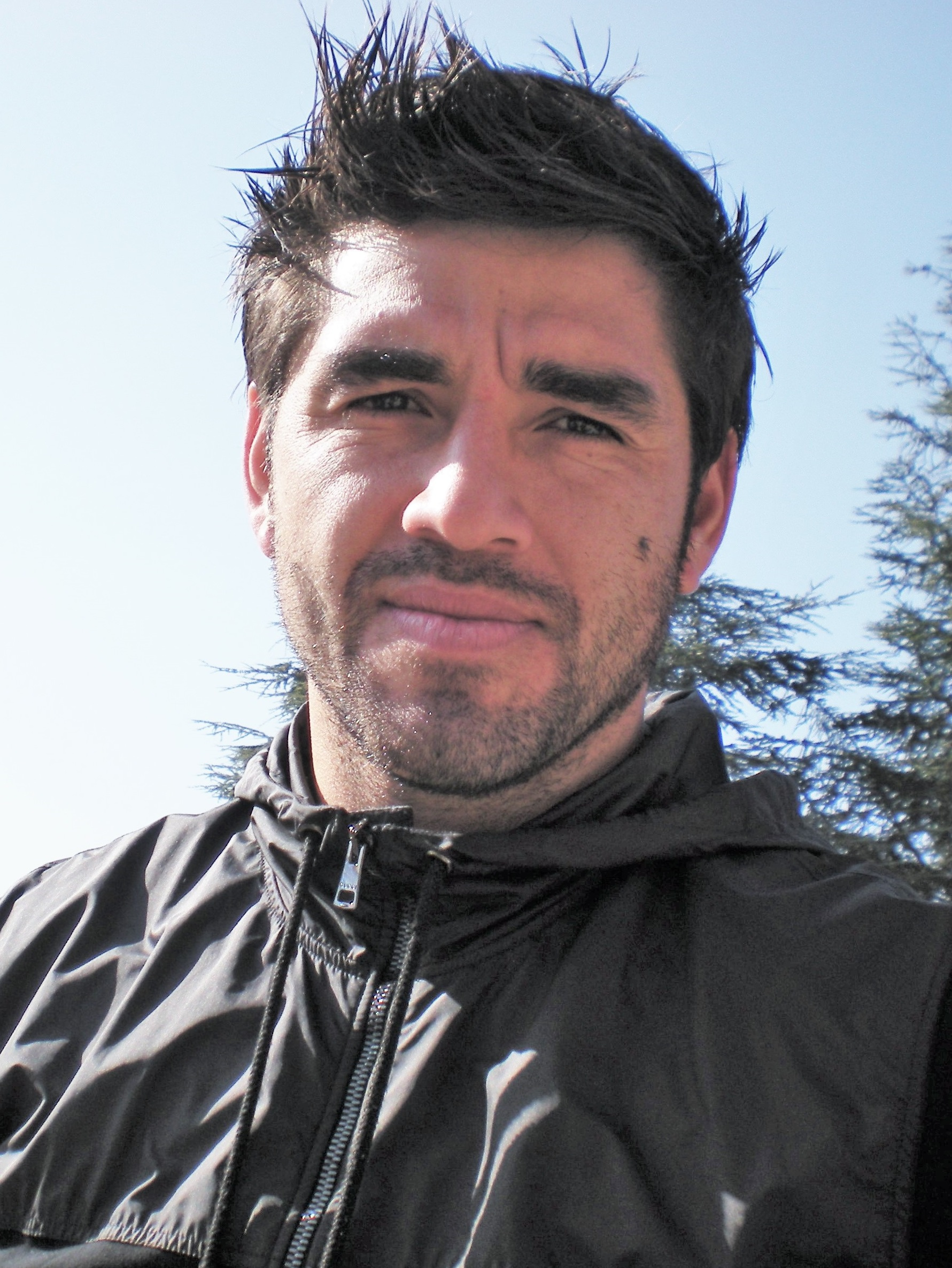

Personal information
- Full name: Marco Andrés Estrada Quinteros
- Date of birth: 28 May 1983 (age 43)
- Place of birth: Quillota, Chile
- Height: 1.78 m (5 ft 10 in)
- Position: Defensive midfielder

Youth career
- Everton

Senior career*
Years	Team	Apps	(Gls)
2000–2006	Everton	84	(3)
2007–2010	Universidad de Chile	96	(14)
2010–2013	Montpellier	84	(8)
2013–2014	Al-Wahda	10	(2)
2015–2016	San Luis	20	(1)
Total		294	(28)

International career
2007–2011	Chile	33	(1)
- * Club domestic league appearances and goals

Marco Andrés Estrada Quinteros (born 28 May 1983) is a Chilean former football midfielder.

== Career ==
He was called up for the Chile national football team's friendlies against the two hosting nations of the 2008 Euro Cup. Against Switzerland, Chile lost 2–1 but had a legitimate goal called off and against Austria, where Chile comfortably won 2–0. Both of these encounters were played on 7 September 2007 and 11 September 2007 in Austria. After two great performances, Estrada was called up for two friendlies in Asia against Japan, where Chile held the hosts to a 0–0 draw and South Korea, where Chile won 1–0.

It was then that Estrada's aerial ability, marking, tenacity, powerful shots, long pass accuracy and technique continued to impress Chile's prestigious coach, Marcelo Bielsa, who nominated him for the Bolivia and Venezuela games. Both matches were played in tough scenarios at the 3600-metre altitude Hernando Siles Stadium in La Paz and the Copa America 2007 Puerto Ordaz Stadium in Venezuela. Chile surprisingly won both games 2–0 and 3–2. Estrada proved to be extremely consistent in both matches, playing as a left wing back and a centre back and went on to be a regular in the Chile national team for three years. Estrada scored his first International goal on Wednesday, 10 June. When his curling free kick beat Bolivian goalkeeper Carlo Arias after midfielder Ignacio Garcia of Bolivia was sent off in the 71st minute. Estrada replaced the suspended Carlos Carmona in the starting line up Chile's final Group H match at the 2010 FIFA World Cup, but was sent off for a foul on Fernando Torres in the lead up to their opponent's Spain's second goal in a 2–1 win.

== Career statistics ==
=== International goals ===
#	Date	Venue	Opponent	Score	Result	Competition
1.	10 June 2009	Santiago, Chile	Bolivia	4–0	Win	FIFA World Cup qualification

== Post-retirement ==
Following his retirement, Estrada played at amateur championships in clubs such as Juventud El Bajío from Quillota. In addition, he opened a sports complex in his city of birth along with the former footballer Jean Beausejour in 2016.

== Honours ==
Everton

- Primera B de Chile (1): 2003

Universidad de Chile

- Primera División de Chile (1): 2009 Apertura

Montpellier

- Ligue 1 (1): 2011–12

San Luis

- Primera B de Chile (1): 2014–15
