= Souleymane Camara =

Senegalese footballer (born 1982)

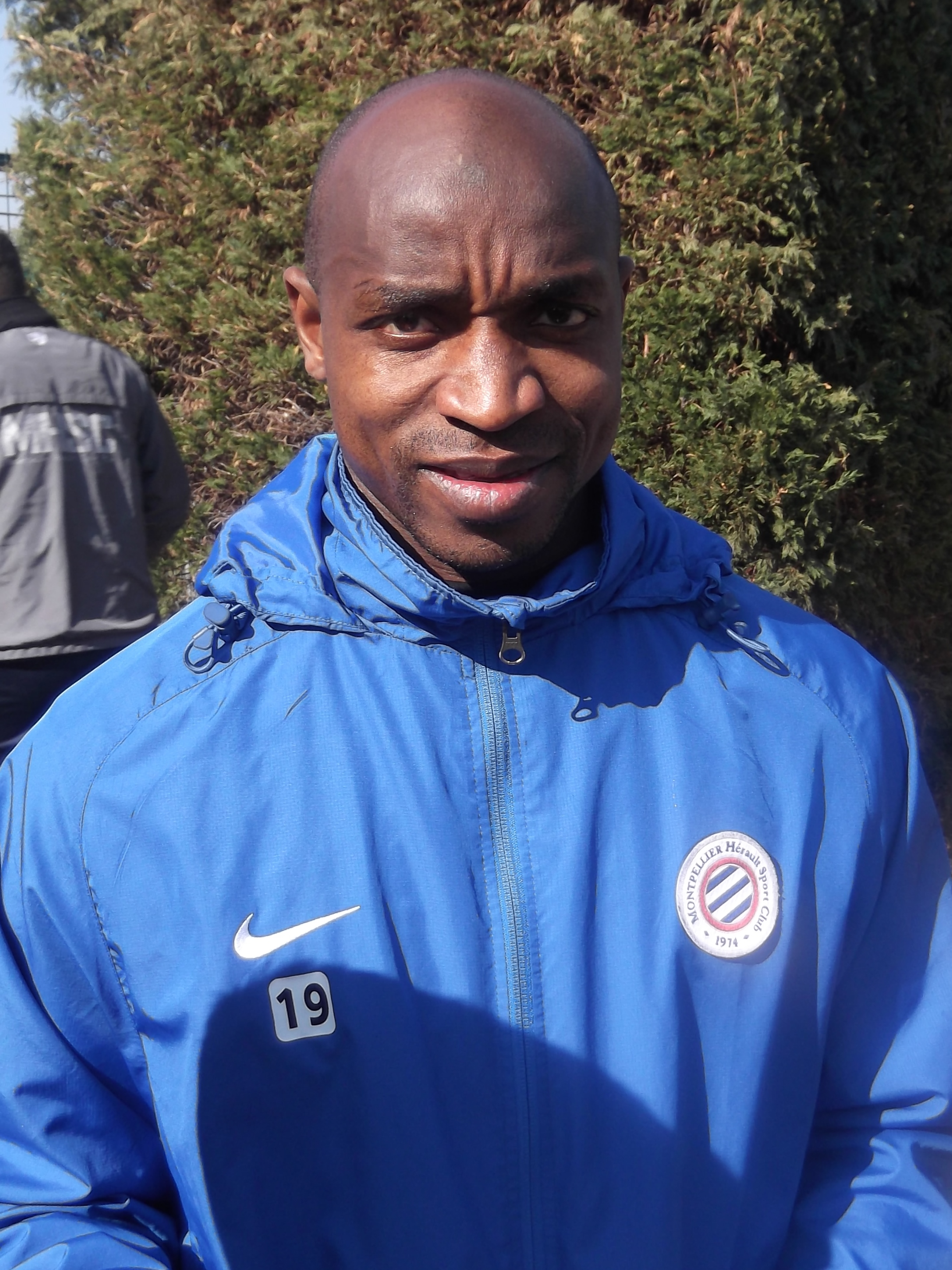
- Camara playing for Montpellier in 2013

Personal information
- Full name: Souleymane Camara
- Date of birth: 22 December 1982 (age 43)
- Place of birth: Dakar, Senegal
- Height: 1.74 m (5 ft 9 in)
- Position: Striker

Youth career
- 2000–2001: Monaco

Senior career*
Years	Team	Apps	(Gls)
2001–2005	Monaco	59	(7)
2004	→ Guingamp (loan)	13	(2)
2005–2008	Nice	31	(1)
2007–2008	→ Montpellier (loan)	37	(11)
2008–2020	Montpellier	347	(59)
Total		487	(80)

International career
2002–2012	Senegal	35	(7)
- * Club domestic league appearances and goals

Souleymane Camara (born 22 December 1982) is a Senegalese former professional footballer who played as a forward. He is a former Senegal international and has represented his nation at the 2002 FIFA World Cup and three Africa Cup of Nations tournaments in 2002, 2006, and 2012. As of 2021, he holds the record of the most appearances for French club Montpellier, with 433, and is the club's second-highest goalscorer, with 76 goals.

== Club career ==
Camara was influential in Montpellier winning their first ever Ligue 1 title in 2012, scoring 9 goals, including one goal in a crucial 2–0 victory over Rennes with two matches left in the season.

On 5 August 2017, Camara scored the only goal in Montpellier's 1–0 win against Caen on matchday 1 of the 2017–18 season. It was his 48th Ligue 1 goal for Montpellier and made him Montpellier's record scorer in Ligue 1, breaking Laurent Blanc's 26-year-old record of 47 Division 1 goals scored for Montpellier in four seasons.

In March 2019 he became the first player to score in 15 different seasons in France's Ligue 1 in the 21st century. In May 2019 he extended his contract with Montpellier for a further season.

In May 2020, it was announced that Camara would not extend his contract with Montpellier, and would retire at the end of the season. By the end of his Montpellier career, Camara played a club-record 433 games in all competitions during his 13-year stay with 76 goals scored – a record bettered only by Blanc.

== Career statistics ==
=== Club ===
As of match played 8 March 2020

Appearances and goals by club, season and competition
Club	Season	League			Coupe de France		Coupe de la Ligue		Continental		Other		Total	
Club	Season	Division	Apps	Goals	Apps	Goals	Apps	Goals	Apps	Goals	Apps	Goals	Apps	Goals
Monaco	2001–02	Ligue 1	21	2	—		—		—		—		21	2
Monaco	2002–03	Ligue 1	22	4	—		—		—		—		22	4
Monaco	2003–04	Ligue 1	4	0	—		—		1 (Note: Appearance(s) in UEFA Champions League)	0	—		5	0
Monaco	2004–05	Ligue 1	10	1	—		—		3	0	—		13	1
Monaco	2005–06	Ligue 1	2	0	—		—		0	0	—		2	0
Monaco	Total		59	7	—		—		4	0	—		63	7
Guingamp (loan)	2003–04	Ligue 1	13	2	—		—		—		—		13	2
Nice	2005–06	Ligue 1	16	1	—		—		—		—		16	1
Nice	2006–07	Ligue 1	15	0	—		—		—		—		15	0
Nice	Total		31	1	—		—		—		—		31	1
Montpellier (loan)	2007–08	Ligue 2	37	11	—		—		—		—		37	11
Montpellier	2008–09	Ligue 2	27	6	—		—		—		—		27	6
Montpellier	2009–10	Ligue 1	38	9	—		1	0	—		—		39	9
Montpellier	2010–11	Ligue 1	36	4	1	0	2	0	2 (Note: Appearance(s) in UEFA Europa League)	0	—		41	4
Montpellier	2011–12	Ligue 1	33	9	2	0	0	0	—		—		35	9
Montpellier	2012–13	Ligue 1	33	10	2	1	3	0	5	1	1 (Note: Appearance(s) in Trophée des Champions)	0	44	12
Montpellier	2013–14	Ligue 1	33	4	3	0	0	0	—		—		36	4
Montpellier	2014–15	Ligue 1	37	3	1	0	1	0	—		—		39	3
Montpellier	2015–16	Ligue 1	33	7	2	0	1	1	—		—		36	8
Montpellier	2016–17	Ligue 1	28	1	1	0	2	0	—		—		31	1
Montpellier	2017–18	Ligue 1	24	2	3	0	3	3	—		—		30	5
Montpellier	2018–19	Ligue 1	12	3	0	0	1	0	—		—		13	3
Montpellier	2019–20	Ligue 1	13	0	2	0	1	0	—		—		16	0
Montpellier	Total		347	58	17	1	15	4	7	1	1	0	387	64
Career Total			487	79	17	1	15	4	11	1	1	0	531	85

=== International ===
Appearances and goals by national team and year
National team	Year	Apps	Goals
Senegal	2001	2	0
Senegal	2002	10	3
Senegal	2003	4	1
Senegal	2004	2	0
Senegal	2005	2	1
Senegal	2006	5	1
Senegal	2010	4	0
Senegal	2011	3	1
Senegal	2012	5	0
Total		37	7

Scores and results list Senegal's goal tally first, score column indicates score after each Camara goal.

List of international goals scored by Souleymane Camara
No.	Date	Venue	Opponent	Score	Result	Competition	Ref.
1	26 January 2002	Stade Modibo Kéïta, Bamako, Mali	Zambia	1-0	1-0	2002 African Cup of Nations	
2	14 May 2002	Riyadh, Saudi Arabia	Saudi Arabia	1-1	2-3	Friendly	
3	12 October 2002	Stade Léopold Sédar Senghor, Dakar, Senegal	Nigeria	1-2	2-2	Friendly	
4	31 May 2003	Stade Léopold Sédar Senghor, Dakar, Senegal	Cape Verde	1-1	2-1	Friendly	
5	12 November 2005	EPRU Stadium, Gqeberha, South Africa	South Africa	1-0	3-2	Friendly	
6	31 January 2006	Port Said Stadium, Port Said, Egypt	Nigeria	1-0	1-2	2006 African Cup of Nations	
7	11 November 2011	Mantes-la-Ville, France	Guinea	2-0	4-1	Friendly	

== Honours ==
Monaco

- Coupe de la Ligue: 2002–03

Montpellier

- Ligue 1: 2011–12

Senegal

- Africa Cup of Nations runner-up: 2002
