= 2015–16 Montpellier HSC season =

Montpellier
2015–16 season
- Chairman: Laurent Nicollin
- Manager: Rolland Courbis
- Stadium: Stade de la Mosson
- Ligue 1: 12th
- Coupe de France: Round of 32
- Coupe de la Ligue: Round of 32
- Top goalscorer: League: Souleymane Camara; Casimir Ninga (7 each); All: Souleymane Camara (8)
- Highest home attendance: 27,163 vs Paris Saint-Germain (21 August 2015)
- Lowest home attendance: 9,076 vs Caen (23 January 2016)
Home colours	Away colours	Third colours

The 2015–16 Montpellier HSC season was the 41st professional season of the club since its creation in 1974.

== Players ==
French teams are limited to four players without EU citizenship. Hence, the squad list includes only the principal nationality of each player; several non-European players on the squad have dual citizenship with an EU country. Also, players from the ACP countries—countries in Africa, the Caribbean, and the Pacific that are signatories to the Cotonou Agreement—are not counted against non-EU quotas due to the Kolpak ruling.

=== Current squad ===
As of 31 August 2015.

Note: Flags indicate national team as defined under FIFA eligibility rules; some limited exceptions apply. Players may hold more than one non-FIFA nationality.

No.	Pos.	Nation	Player
1	GK	FRA	Laurent Pionnier
2	DF	SEN	Mamadou N'Diaye
3	DF	FRA	Daniel Congré
4	DF	BRA	Hilton (captain)
6	MF	FRA	Joris Marveaux
8	MF	FRA	Jonas Martin
9	FW	MLI	Mustapha Yatabaré (on loan from Trabzonspor)
10	MF	ALG	Ryad Boudebouz
12	FW	FRA	Florian Sotoca
13	MF	TUN	Ellyes Skhiri
14	MF	FRA	Bryan Dabo
15	DF	ALG	Ramy Bensebaini (on loan from Paradou)
16	GK	FRA	Geoffrey Jourdren
17	MF	FRA	Paul Lasne
19	FW	SEN	Souleymane Camara

No.	Pos.	Nation	Player
20	MF	FRA	Morgan Sanson
21	DF	FRA	William Rémy
22	MF	SUI	Sébastien Wüthrich
23	MF	TUN	Jamel Saihi
24	DF	FRA	Jérôme Roussillon
25	DF	FRA	Mathieu Deplagne
26	FW	FRA	Kévin Bérigaud
28	FW	COM	Djamel Bakar
29	FW	CHA	Rodrigue Ninga
30	GK	FRA	Jonathan Ligali
31	FW	FRA	Quentin Cornette
32	FW	PER	Jean Deza
33	MF	FRA	Anthony Ribelin
35	DF	SUI	Dylan Gissi

=== Out on loan ===
Note: Flags indicate national team as defined under FIFA eligibility rules; some limited exceptions apply. Players may hold more than one non-FIFA nationality.

No. / Pos. / Nation / Player; — / DF / FRA / Nicolas Saint-Ruf (on loan to Orléans)	No. / Pos. / Nation / Player; — / FW / BEN / Steve Mounié (on loan to Nîmes)

== Transfers ==
=== Transfers in ===
Date	Pos.	Player	Age	Moved from	Fee	Notes
1 July 2015	DF	(France) William Rémy	24	(France) Dijon	Free Transfer	
7 July 2015	MF	(Algeria) Ryad Boudebouz	25	(France) Bastia	Undisclosed	
31 August 2015	FW	(Chad) Rodrigue Ninga	22	(Gabon) Mangasport	Undisclosed	

=== Loans in ===
Date	Pos.	Player	Age	Loaned from	Return date	Notes
1 July 2015	DF	(Algeria) Ramy Bensebaini	20	(Algeria) Paradou	30 June 2016	
30 August 2015	FW	(Mali) Mustapha Yatabaré	29	(Turkey) Trabzonspor	30 June 2016	

=== Transfers out ===
Date	Pos.	Player	Age	Moved to	Fee	Notes
1 July 2015	DF	(Ivory Coast) Siaka Tiéné	33	Unattached	Released	
1 July 2015	MF	(Morocco) Karim Aït-Fana	26	Unattached	Released	
7 July 2015	DF	(Morocco) Yassine Jebbour	24	(France) Bastia	Free Transfer	
28 July 2015	DF	(Morocco) Abdelhamid El Kaoutari	25	(Italy) Palermo	Undisclosed	
29 August 2015	FW	(France) Anthony Mounier	27	(Italy) Bologna	Undisclosed	

=== Loans out ===
Date	Pos.	Player	Age	Loaned to	Return date	Notes
26 July 2015	DF	(France) Nicolas Saint-Ruf	22	(France) Orléans	30 July 2016	
31 August 2015	FW	(Benin) Steve Mounié	20	(France) Nîmes	30 July 2016	

== Competitions ==
=== Ligue 1 ===
==== League table ====
Pos	Team	Pld	W	D	L	GF	GA	GD	Pts
10	Bastia	38	14	8	16	36	42	−6	50
11	Bordeaux	38	12	14	12	50	57	−7	50
12	Montpellier	38	14	7	17	49	47	+2	49
13	Marseille	38	10	18	10	48	42	+6	48
14	Nantes	38	12	12	14	33	44	−11	48

Source: Ligue 1, Soccerway
Rules for classification: 1) Points; 2) Goal difference; 3) Goals scored; 4) Head-to-head points; 5) Head-to-head goal difference; 6) Fairplay ranking.

==== Results summary ====
Overall								Home						Away					
Pld	W	D	L	GF	GA	GD	Pts	W	D	L	GF	GA	GD	W	D	L	GF	GA	GD
38	14	7	17	49	47	+2	49	9	0	10	26	23	+3	5	7	7	23	24	−1

Last updated: 12 March 2016.
Source: Competitive matches

==== Results by round ====
Round	1	2	3	4	5	6	7	8	9	10	11	12	13	14	15	16	17	18	19	20	21	22	23	24	25	26	27	28	29	30	31	32	33	34	35	36	37	38
Ground	H	A	H	A	H	A	H	H	A	A	H	A	H	H	A	H	A	H	A	H	A	H	A	H	A	H	A	H	A	H	A	A	H	A	H	A	H	A
Result	L	L	L	D	L	L	L	W	L	D	W	D	W	W	W	L	D	W	L	L	L	L	W	L	D	W	W	W	D	L	L	D	L	W	W	W	W	L
Position	20	20	19	19	19	19	20	18	18	18	17	17	17	14	13	15	16	13	15	15	16	18	17	18	18	16	15	14	15	15	16	16	16	16	11	11	11	12

Source: Ligue1
A = Away; H = Home; W = Win; D = Draw; L = Loss

==== Matches ====
Win Draw Loss

8 August 2015 1	Montpellier	0–2	Angers	Montpellier
21:00 CEST (UTC+02:00)	Deplagne (yellow card) 27'; Bensebaini (yellow card) 61'; Dabo (yellow card) 81'	Report	Camara 4'; N'Doye (yellow card) 8'; Manceau (yellow card) 74'; Sunu 79'	Stadium: Stade de la Mosson; Attendance: 11,789; Referee: Hakim Ben El Hadj

15 August 2015 2	Rennes	1–0	Montpellier	Rennes
20:00 CEST (UTC+02:00)	Sio (yellow card) 45+1'; Pedro Henrique (yellow card) 58'; Fernandes (yellow card) 60'; Grosicki 85'	Report	Jourdren (yellow card) 45+1'	Stadium: Roazhon Park; Attendance: 18,748; Referee: Mikael Lesage

21 August 2015 3	Montpellier	0–1	Paris Saint-Germain	Montpellier
20:30 CEST (UTC+02:00)	Bensebaini (yellow card) 45+1'; Boudebouz (yellow card) 55'	Report	Matuidi (yellow card) 49', (goal) 61'; Motta (yellow card) 74'	Stadium: Stade de la Mosson; Attendance: 27,163; Referee: Sébastien Moreira

29 August 2015 4	Troyes	0–0	Montpellier	Troyes
20:00 CEST (UTC+02:00)	Saunier (yellow card) 56'; Martins Pereira (yellow card) 79'	Report	Marveaux (yellow card) 86'	Stadium: Stade de l'Aube; Attendance: 11,094; Referee: Wilfried Bien

12 September 2015 5	Montpellier	1–2	Saint-Étienne	Montpellier
20:00 CEST (UTC+02:00)	Dabo (yellow card) 37'; Cornette (yellow card) 42'; Marveaux (yellow card) 66', (goal) 90+2'	Report	Bayal Sall (yellow card) 18', (goal) 24'; Roux 59'; Polomat (yellow card) 61'	Stadium: Stade de la Mosson; Attendance: 10,734; Referee: Lionel Jaffredo

19 September 2015 6	Caen	2–1	Montpellier	Caen
20:00 CEST (UTC+02:00)	Rodelin 19'; Adeoti (yellow card) 31'; Delort (yellow card) 47'; Louis 90+2'	Report	Martin 32' (pen.); Yatabaré (yellow card) 41'; Boudebouz (yellow card) 46'; Deplagne (yellow card) 87'; Lasne (yellow card) 89'	Stadium: Stade Michel d'Ornano; Attendance: 15,069; Referee: Hakim Ben El Hadj

24 September 2015 7	Montpellier	2–3	Monaco	Montpellier
19:55 CEST (UTC+2)	Congré 26'; Carrillo 45' (o.g.); Ligali (yellow card) 90+4'; Bensebaini (yellow card) 90+5'	Report	Coentrão 56'; Lemar 65'; Touré (yellow card) 72'; Fabinho 90+5' (pen.)	Stadium: Stade de la Mosson; Attendance: 10,032; Referee: Clément Turpin

27 September 2015 8	Montpellier	2–1	Lorient	Montpellier
17:00 CEST (UTC+02:00)	Bensebaini 6', (yellow card) 47'; Martin 57', (yellow card) 57'	Report	Gassama (yellow card) 30'; Koné (yellow card) 38'; Abdullah 48', (yellow card) 61' (yellow-red card) 90+2'; Philippoteaux (yellow card) 49'; Le Goff (yellow card) 86'	Stadium: Stade de la Mosson; Attendance: 10,518; Referee: Saïd Ennjimi

2 October 2015 9	Lille	2–0	Montpellier	Villeneuve d'Ascq
20:30 CEST (UTC+02:00)	Boufal 43' (pen.); Mavuba (yellow card) 48'; Obbadi (yellow card) 51'; Sidibé 64'; Corchia (yellow card) 72'	Report	Dabo (yellow card) 58'	Stadium: Stade Pierre-Mauroy; Attendance: 30,895; Referee: Saïd Ennjimi

18 October 2015 10	Bordeaux	0–0	Montpellier	Bordeaux
17:00 CEST (UTC+02:00)	Ounas (yellow card) 38'; Saivet (yellow card) 45+2'; Maurice-Belay (yellow card) 84'; Sané (yellow card) 90+2'	Report	Deplagne (yellow card) 41'; Rémy (yellow card) 90+2'	Stadium: Nouveau Stade de Bordeaux; Attendance: 23,881; Referee: Bartolomeu Varela

24 October 2015 11	Montpellier	2–0	Bastia	Montpellier
20:00 CEST (UTC+02:00)	Deplagne (yellow card) 58'; Boudebouz 63'; Ninga 88'	Report	Peybernes (yellow card) 54'; Ngando (yellow card) 75'; Cahuzac (yellow card) 82'	Stadium: Stade de la Mosson; Attendance: 12,240; Referee: Jérôme Miguelgorry

31 October 2015 12	Toulouse	1–1	Montpellier	Toulouse
20:00 CET (UTC+01:00)	Akpa Akpro (yellow card) 25'; Machach (yellow card) 35', (goal) 39'; Regattin (yellow card) 85'; Bodiger (yellow card) 89'	Report	Roussillon 34'; Ninga (yellow card) 58'; Bensebaini (yellow card) 90+3'	Stadium: Stadium Municipal; Attendance: 8,883; Referee: Stéphane Lannoy

7 November 2015 13	Montpellier	2–1	Nantes	Montpellier
20:00 CET (UTC+01:00)	Roussillon 12'; Hilton 90'	Report	Iloki (yellow card) 50'; Vizcarrondo (yellow card) 56'; Bammou 63'; Touré (yellow card) 65'; Cana (yellow card) 65'	Stadium: Stade de la Mosson; Attendance: 13,536; Referee: Frank Schneider

21 November 2015 14	Montpellier	2–1	Reims	Montpellier
20:00 CET (UTC+01:00)	Yatabaré 21'; Dabo (yellow card) 23', (goal) 84'; Roussillon (yellow card) 49'; Camara 69'; Bensebaini (yellow card) 77'	Report	Weber 12'; Signorino (yellow card) 26'; Mfulu (yellow card) 36'	Stadium: Stade de la Mosson; Attendance: 9,544; Referee: Stephane Jochem

27 November 2015 15	Lyon	2–4	Montpellier	Lyon
20:30 CET (UTC+01:00)	Lacazette (yellow card) 12', (goal) 14'; Rafael (yellow card) 41'; Gonalons (yellow card) 68'; Ghezzal 84'	Report	Gonalons 8' (o.g.); Ninga 11', 48'; Bensebaini (yellow card) 20'; Rémy (yellow card) 45'; Dabo (yellow card) 48'; Hilton (yellow card) 57'; Camara 80'	Stadium: Stade de Gerland; Attendance: 29,960; Referee: Benoît Millot

2 December 2015 16	Montpellier	0–2	Gazélec Ajaccio	Montpellier
19:00 CET (UTC+01:00)	Hilton (yellow card) 30'	Report	Zoua 45+3'; Filippi (yellow card) 50'; Sylla (yellow card) 70'; Tshibumbu 74', (yellow card) 82'; Lemoigne (yellow card) 78'	Stadium: Stade de la Mosson; Attendance: 9,332; Referee: Hakim Ben El Hadj

6 December 2015 17	Marseille	2–2	Montpellier	Marseille
14:00 CET (UTC+01:00)	Romao (yellow card) 36'; Batshuayi (yellow card) 40'; Cabella 48'; Sarr 72'	Report	Ninga 32', 56', (yellow card) 48'	Stadium: Stade Vélodrome; Attendance: 41,486; Referee: Bartolomeu Varela

12 December 2015 18	Montpellier	2–1	Guingamp	Montpellier
20:00 CET (UTC+01:00)	Camara 54'; Ninga 62'; Hilton (yellow card) 90+2'; Roussillon (yellow card) 90+3'	Report	Benezet (yellow card) 28' (yellow-red card); Privat 32'; Cardy (yellow card) 58'; Coco (yellow card) 90+3'	Stadium: Stade de la Mosson; Attendance: 10,846; Referee: Sébastien Moreira

18 December 2015 19	Nice	1–0	Montpellier	Nice
20:30 CET (UTC+01:00)	Boscagli 31'; Bodmer (yellow card) 42'; Mendy (yellow card) 64'	Report	Ninga (yellow card) 7'; Martin (yellow card) 12'	Stadium: Allianz Riviera; Attendance: 14,026; Referee: Tony Chapron

9 January 2016 20	Montpellier	0–1	Bordeaux	Montpellier
20:00 CET (UTC+01:00)	Yatabaré (yellow card) 39'; Rémy (yellow card) 41'	Report	Diabaté 16'; Khazri (yellow card) 41'	Stadium: Stade de la Mosson; Attendance: 10,603; Referee: Clément Turpin

16 January 2016 21	Bastia	1–0	Montpellier	Furiani
20:00 CET (UTC+01:00)	Brandão (yellow card) 31'; Ayité 48'; Djiku (yellow card) 59'; Fofana (red card) 65'; Modesto (yellow card) 90'	Report	Deplagne (yellow card) 41'; Congré (red card) 68'	Stadium: Stade Armand Cesari; Attendance: 10,337; Referee: Frank Schneider

23 January 2016 22	Montpellier	1–2	Caen	Montpellier
20:00 CET (UTC+01:00)	Bensebaini 23'; Roussillon (yellow card) 58'; Saihi (yellow card) 71'	Report	Vercoutre (yellow card) 23'; Rodelin 40'; Delort 52'	Stadium: Stade de la Mosson; Attendance: 9,076; Referee: François Letexier

30 January 2016 23	Gazélec Ajaccio	0–4	Montpellier	Ajaccio, Corsica
20:00 CET (UTC+01:00)	Đoković (yellow card) 8'; Lemoigne (yellow card) 26'; Touré (yellow card) 40'	Report	Dabo (yellow card) 8', (goal) 52', 57'; Yatabaré 14'; Camara (yellow card) 28'; Martin 41' (pen.), (yellow card) 42'	Stadium: Stade Ange Casanova; Attendance: 3,629; Referee: Bartolomeu Varela

2 February 2016 24	Montpellier	0–1	Marseille	Montpellier
21:00 CET (UTC+01:00)	Martin (yellow card) 51'; Saihi (yellow card) 83'	Report	Rabillard (yellow card) 30'; Nkoudou 68'; Thauvin (red card) 69'; Cabella (yellow card) 86'; De Ceglie (yellow card) 90+4'	Stadium: Stade de la Mosson; Attendance: 16,756; Referee: Tony Chapron

6 February 2016 25	Lorient	1–1	Montpellier	Lorient
20:00 CET (UTC+01:00)	Jouffre (yellow card) 28'; Bellugou (red card) 37'; Cabot 49'	Report	Bérigaud 45+1'; Yatabaré (yellow card) 88'	Stadium: Stade du Moustoir; Attendance: 9,077; Referee: Mikael Lesage

13 February 2016 26	Montpellier	2–0	Toulouse	Montpellier
20:00 CET (UTC+01:00)	Yatabaré 24'; Camara 88'	Report	Regattin (yellow card) 21'; Moubandje (yellow card) 82'	Stadium: Stade de la Mosson; Attendance: 14,616; Referee: Saïd Ennjimi

20 February 2016 27	Angers	2–3	Montpellier	Angers
20:00 CET (UTC+01:00)	Bouka Moutou 65'; Karanović 90+2'	Report	Bérigaud 2'; Yatabaré 7'; Camara 34'; Ninga (yellow card) 82'	Stadium: Stade Jean-Bouin; Attendance: 11,165; Referee: Sébastien Moreira

27 February 2016 28	Montpellier	3–0	Lille	Montpellier
17:00 CET (UTC+01:00)	Ninga (yellow card) 33'; Bérigaud 52'; Dabo 60'; Skhiri 86'	Report	Pavard (yellow card) 59'; Bauthéac (yellow card) 66'; Boufal (yellow card) 74'	Stadium: Stade de la Mosson; Attendance: 9,576; Referee: Hakim Bel El Hajd

5 March 2016 29	Paris Saint-Germain	0–0	Montpellier	Paris
17:00 CET (UTC+01:00)		Report	Rémy (yellow card) 80'	Stadium: Parc des Princes; Attendance: 45,173; Referee: Tony Chapron

12 March 2016 30	Montpellier	0–2	Nice	Montpellier
20:00 CET (UTC+01:00)	Martin (yellow card) 81'; Ninga (yellow card) 90+2'	Report	Germain 62'; Pied (yellow card) 64'; Pléa 76'	Stadium: Stade de la Mosson; Attendance: 13,462; Referee: Lionel Jaffredo

19 March 2016 31	Saint-Étienne	3–0	Montpellier	Saint-Étienne
17:00 CET (UTC+01:00)	Lemoine (yellow card) 66'; Roux 74'; Tannane 80'; Eysseric 84'	Report	Boudebouz (yellow card) 45'; Congré (yellow card) 90'	Stadium: Stade Geoffroy-Guichard; Attendance: 28,037; Referee: Jérôme Miguelgorry

2 April 2016 32	Guingamp	2–2	Montpellier HSC	Guingamp
20:00 CEST (UTC+2)	Salibur 5'; Diallo (yellow card) 28'; Sorbon 47'; Kerbrat (yellow card) 84'	Report	Deplagne (yellow card) 9'; Skhiri (yellow card) 30'; Sanson 34', 53'	Stadium: Stade du Roudourou; Attendance: 13,640; Referee: Ruddy Buquet

8 April 2016 33	Montpellier	0–2	Lyon	Montpellier
20:30 CEST (UTC+2)	Saihi (yellow card) 38'	Report	Cornet 34', 40', (yellow card) 66'; Ferri (yellow card) 68'	Stadium: Stade de la Mosson; Attendance: 15,066; Referee: Antony Gautier

17 April 2016 34	Nantes	0–2	Montpellier	Nantes
14:00 CEST (UTC+2)	Vizcarrondo (yellow card) 45+1'	Report	Dabo 23'; Jourdren (yellow card) 43'; Congré (yellow card) 60'; Skhiri 71'	Stadium: Stade de la Beaujoire; Attendance: 21,789; Referee: Stéphane Jochem

24 April 2016 35	Montpellier	4–1	Troyes	Montpellier
17:00 CEST (UTC+2)	Roussillon 14'; Saunier 27' (o.g.); Martin 34'; Hilton (red card) 41'; Camara 55'	Report	Darbion 20'; Confais (yellow card) 68'; Rincón (yellow card) 82'	Stadium: Stade de la Mosson; Attendance: 14,323; Referee: Mikael Lesage

30 April 2016 36	Reims	2–3	Montpellier	Reims
19:00 CET (UTC+1)	De Préville (yellow card) 52'; Diego (yellow card) 54'; Oniangue 83'; Bifouma 90+2'	Report	Camara 38'; Roussillon (yellow card) 83'; Congré 84'; Sanson 86'	Stadium: Stade Auguste Delaune; Attendance: 19,716; Referee: Fredy Fautrel

7 May 2016 37	Montpellier	2–0	Rennes	Montpellier
21:00 CEST (UTC+02:00)	Ninga 58'; Boudebouz 70'	Report		Stadium: Stade de la Mosson; Attendance: 13,004; Referee: Sébastien Moreira

14 May 2016 38	Monaco	2–0	Montpellier	Fontvieille
21:00 CEST (UTC+02:00)				Stadium: Stade Louis II

=== Coupe de la Ligue ===
28 October 2015 Round of 32	Lorient	3–2	Montpellier	Lorient
21:00 CET (UTC+01:00)	Jeannot 6' (pen.); Gakpa 36'; Philippoteaux 40'; Mulumba (yellow card) 82'	Report	N'Diaye 13'; Deza (yellow card) 83'; Camara 84'	Stadium: Stade du Moustoir; Attendance: 9,699; Referee: Wilfried Bien

=== Coupe de France ===
3 January 2016 Round of 64	Epernay	0–1	Montpellier	Epernay
14:15 CET (UTC+01:00)	Lefreve (yellow card) 54'; Leonard (yellow card) 56'; Ghisolfi (yellow card) 60'	Report	Yataberé 62'; Roussillon (yellow card) 65'	Stadium: Stade Paul Chandon; Attendance: 3,000; Referee: Alexandre Castro

20 January 2016 Round of 32	Marseille	2–0	Montpellier	Marseille
21:00 CET	Sarr (yellow card) 32'; Cabella (yellow card) 37'; Bensebaini 41' (o.g.); Dja Djédjé 55', (yellow card) 58'	Report		Stadium: Stade Vélodrome; Attendance: 37,078; Referee: Lionel Jaffredo
