= 2016–17 Montpellier HSC season =

Montpellier
2016–17 season
- Chairman: Laurent Nicollin
- Manager: Frédéric Hantz
- Stadium: Stade de la Mosson
- Ligue 1: 15th
- Coupe de France: Round of 32
- Coupe de la Ligue: Round of 16
- Top goalscorer: League: Steve Mounié (14); All: Steve Mounié (15)
Home colours	Away colours	Third colours

The 2016–17 Montpellier HSC season was the 42nd professional season of the club since its creation in 1974.

== Players ==
French teams are limited to four players without EU citizenship. Hence, the squad list includes only the principal nationality of each player; several non-European players on the squad have dual citizenship with an EU country. Also, players from the ACP countries—countries in Africa, the Caribbean, and the Pacific that are signatories to the Cotonou Agreement—are not counted against non-EU quotas due to the Kolpak ruling.

=== Current squad ===
As of 31 August 2015.

Note: Flags indicate national team as defined under FIFA eligibility rules; some limited exceptions apply. Players may hold more than one non-FIFA nationality.

No.	Pos.	Nation	Player
1	GK	FRA	Laurent Pionnier
3	DF	FRA	Daniel Congré
4	DF	BRA	Hilton (captain)
5	MF	MLI	Yacouba Sylla
6	MF	FRA	Joris Marveaux
7	MF	FRA	Paul Lasne
10	MF	ALG	Ryad Boudebouz
11	FW	FRA	Jonathan Ikoné
12	DF	CZE	Lukáš Pokorný
13	MF	TUN	Ellyes Skhiri
15	FW	BEN	Steve Mounié
16	GK	FRA	Geoffrey Jourdren
17	MF	FRA	Pierrick Fito

No.	Pos.	Nation	Player
18	FW	BEL	Isaac Mbenza
19	FW	SEN	Souleymane Camara
20	FW	RSA	Keagan Dolly
21	DF	FRA	William Rémy
22	MF	FRA	Killian Sanson
23	DF	FRA	Nordi Mukiele
24	DF	FRA	Jérôme Roussillon
25	DF	FRA	Mathieu Deplagne
26	DF	FRA	Morgan Poaty
27	DF	COD	Cédric Mongongu
28	MF	BEN	Stéphane Sessègnon
29	FW	CHA	Casimir Ninga
30	GK	FRA	Jonathan Ligali

== Competitions ==
=== Ligue 1 ===
==== League table ====
Pos	Team	Pld	W	D	L	GF	GA	GD	Pts
13	Toulouse	38	10	14	14	37	41	−4	44
14	Metz	38	11	10	17	39	72	−33	43
15	Montpellier	38	10	9	19	48	66	−18	39
16	Dijon	38	8	13	17	46	58	−12	37
17	Caen	38	10	7	21	36	65	−29	37

Source: Ligue 1, Soccerway
Rules for classification: 1) Points; 2) Goal difference; 3) Goals scored; 4) Head-to-head goal difference; 5) Fairplay ranking.

==== Results summary ====
Overall								Home						Away					
Pld	W	D	L	GF	GA	GD	Pts	W	D	L	GF	GA	GD	W	D	L	GF	GA	GD
38	10	9	19	48	66	−18	39	8	5	6	28	22	+6	2	4	13	20	44	−24

Last updated: 20 November 2018.
Source: Competitive matches

==== Results by round ====
Round	1	2	3	4	5	6	7	8	9	10	11	12	13	14	15	16	17	18	19	20	21	22	23	24	25	26	27	28	29	30	31	32	33	34	35	36	37	38
Ground	H	A	H	A	H	A	H	A	H	A	A	H	A	H	A	H	A	H	A	H	A	A	H	H	A	H	A	H	H	A	H	A	H	A	H	A	H	A
Result	W	L	D	D	D	L	L	D	W	L	D	W	D	D	L	W	L	W	L	D	L	L	W	L	W	W	L	D	L	L	L	W	W	L	L	L	L	L
Position	6	13	14	13	12	13	16	17	15	17	16	13	13	13	14	12	13	11	11	13	13	15	13	14	11	11	13	13	13	15	15	14	12	13	13	15	15	15

Source: Ligue 1
A = Away; H = Home; W = Win; D = Draw; L = Loss

==== Matches ====
Win Draw Loss

13 August 2016 1	Montpellier	1–0	Angers	Montpellier
20:00 CEST (UTC+2)	Boudebouz 8'; Mounié (yellow card) 76'	Report	Thomas (yellow card) 21'; Capelle (yellow card) 39'	Stadium: Stade de la Mosson; Attendance: 10,389; Referee: Bartolomeu Varela

21 August 2016 2	Saint-Étienne	3–1	Montpellier	Saint-Étienne
17:00	Monnet-Paquet 47'; Saint-Louis 50'; Karamoko (yellow card) 56'; Beric 85'	Report	Mounie 23'; Ninga (yellow card) 80'	Stadium: Stade Geoffroy-Guichard; Attendance: 23,661; Referee: Ruddy Buquet

27 August 2016 3	Montpellier	1–1	Rennes	Montpellier
20:00 CET	Congré 22'; Vanden Borre (yellow card) 38'	Report	Saïd (yellow card) 41'; Pedro Mendes (yellow card) 59'; Diakhaby 64'	Stadium: Stade de la Mosson; Attendance: 9,163; Referee: (France) Benoît Millot

10 September 2016 4	Guingamp	1–1	Montpellier	Guingamp
20:00 CEST (UTC+01:00)	Coco 36'	Report	11' M. Sanson	Stadium: Stade de Roudourou; Attendance: 12,630; Referee: Clément Turpin

18 September 2016 5	Montpellier	1–1	Nice	Montpellier
15:00	Skhiri (yellow card) 60'; Boudebouz 67' (pen.)	Report	Eysseric (yellow card) 77'; Belhanda 85'	Stadium: Stade de la Mosson; Attendance: 12,272; Referee: Lionel Jaffredo

21 September 2016 6	Lyon	5–1	Montpellier	Décines-Charpieu
19:00 CEST (UTC+02:00)	Fekir 36', 57'; Tolisso 42', 71'; Cornet 75'	Report	M. Sanson 4'; Poaty (red card) 8'; Deplagne (yellow card) 36'	Stadium: Parc Olympique Lyonnais; Attendance: 32,193; Referee: Bartolomeu Varela

24 September 2016 7	Montpellier	0–1	Metz	Montpellier
20:00 CEST		Report	Erdinç 45+2' (pen.)	Stadium: Stade de la Mosson; Referee: Tony Chapron

1 October 2016 8	Dijon	3–3	Montpellier	Dijon
20:00	Dinoy 39'; Gastien (yellow card) 68'; Vanden Borre 81' (o.g.); Abeid (yellow card) 88'; Rivière 90'	Report	Ninga 18' 25' 58' (yellow card) 84'; Boudebouz (yellow card) 67'	Stadium: Stade Gaston Gérard; Attendance: 8,428; Referee: (France) François Letexier

15 October 2016 9	Montpellier	3–2	Caen	Montpellier
20:00 CEST (UTC+2)	Ninga 2', 76'; Mounié (yellow card) 30' (red card) 71', (goal) 65'	Report	Yahia 8'; Santini 69'	Stadium: Stade de la Mosson; Attendance: 14,456; Referee: Saïd Ennjimi

21 October 2016 10	Monaco	6–2	Montpellier	Monaco
20:45CEST (UTC+2)	Glik (yellow card) 8'; Falcao 36' (pen.); Mbappé 49'; Jemerson 64', (yellow card) 72'; Germain 74'; Lemar 76'; Traoré 89'	Report	Boudebouz 9', 61' (pen.)	Stadium: Stade Louis II; Attendance: 7,619; Referee: Amaury Delerue

29 October 2016 11	Lorient	2–2	Montpellier	Lorient
20:00	Touré 16'; Marveaux 24'; Barthelmé (yellow card) 67'; Waris (yellow card) 90+2'	Summary	Vanden Borre (yellow card) 37'; Camara 45+2'; Sanson 69'	Stadium: Stade du Moustoir; Attendance: 9,872; Referee: (France) Jérôme Miguelgorry

4 November 2016 12	Montpellier	3–1	Marseille	Montpellier
20:45 CET (UTC+1)	Boudebouz 4', 36'; Mounié 57'; Deplagne (yellow card) 69'	Report	Lopez (yellow card) 28'; Thauvin 52'	Stadium: Stade de la Mosson; Attendance: 18,451; Referee: Antony Gautier

19 November 2016 13	Bastia	1–1	Montpellier	Furiani
20:00	Skhiri 6' (o.g.); Cioni (yellow card) 50'; Nangis (yellow card) 54'	Report	Mounié 55'	Stadium: Stade Armand Cesari; Attendance: 10,189; Referee: (France) Sébastien Moreira

26 November 2016 14	Montpellier	0–0	Nancy	Montpellier
20:00 CET (UTC+1)	Lasne (yellow card) 70'; Sessègnon (yellow card) 80' (yellow-red card) 82'	Report	Diagne (yellow card) 44'; Diarra (yellow card) 90'; Dia (yellow card) 90'	Stadium: Stade de la Mosson; Attendance: 9,463; Referee: Karim Abed

30 November 2016 15	Toulouse	1–0	Montpellier	Toulouse
19:00 CET (UTC+01:00)	Sylla 19'; Sangaré (yellow card) 70'	Report	Roussillon (yellow card) 32'; Rémy (yellow card) 61'; Sanson (yellow card) 90+1'	Stadium: Stadium Municipal; Attendance: 13,752; Referee: Amaury Delerue

3 December 2016 16	Montpellier	3–0	Paris Saint-Germain	Montpellier
17:00 CET (UTC+1)	Lasne 42'; Skhiri 48'; Boudebouz 80'	Report	Nkunku (yellow card) 18'; Cavani (yellow card) 58'	Stadium: Stade de la Mosson; Attendance: 17,132; Referee: Bartolomeu Varela

10 December 2016 17	Lille	2–1	Montpellier	Villeneuve d'Ascq
20:00 CET (UTC+1)	De Préville 5'; Sankharé 38'; Enyeama (yellow card) 90+4'	Report	Mounié (yellow card) 18', (goal) 81'	Stadium: Stade Pierre-Mauroy; Attendance: 27,391; Referee: Tony Chapron

17 December 2016 18	Montpellier	4–0	Bordeaux	Bordeaux
20:00 CET (UTC+1)	Lasne 13'; Sessegnon 20', (yellow card) 66'; Deplagne (yellow card) 56'; Mounié 84'; Sylla 90+2'	Report	Lewczuk (yellow card) 19'; Ménez (red card) 38'; Sertic (yellow card) 66'	Stadium: Nouveau Stade de Bordeaux; Attendance: 9,841; Referee: Frank Schneider

21 December 2016 19	Nantes	1–0	Montpellier	Nantes
20:50 CET (UTC+1)	Lucas Lima 12' (pen.)	Report		Stadium: Stade de la Beaujoire; Attendance: 18,125; Referee: Karim Abed

14 January 2017 20	Montpellier	1–1	Dijon	Montpellier
20:00 CET (UTC+1)	Roussillon 87'	Report	Tavares 27'	Stadium: Stade de la Mosson; Attendance: 14,539; Referee: Jérôme Brisard

21 January 2017 21	Metz	2–0	Montpellier	Metz
20:00	Diabaté 14', 19'	Report		Stadium: Stade Saint-Symphorien; Attendance: 11,553; Referee: Hakim Ben El Hadj

27 January 2017 22	Marseille	5–1	Montpellier	Marseille
20:45 CEST (UTC+2)	Gomis 4', 19', 77'; Rolando 38'; Dória (yellow card) 80'; Thauvin 88' (pen.)	Report	Boudebouz 49'; Sessègnon (yellow card) 87'; Rémy (red card) 87'	Stadium: Stade Vélodrome; Attendance: 28,527; Referee: Tony Chapron

4 February 2017 23	Montpellier	2–1	Bastia	Montpellier
20:00	Mounié 17' 64'; Skhiri (yellow card) 19'; Roussillon (yellow card) 37'; Deplagne (yellow card) 90'	Report	Oniangué (yellow card) 31'; Crivelli 34'; Djiku (red card) 90+3'	Stadium: Stade de la Mosson; Attendance: 8,960; Referee: (France) Olivier Thual

7 February 2017 24	Montpellier	1–2	Monaco	Montpellier
19:00 CET (UTC+1)	Sylla (yellow card) 15'; Hilton 47'	Report	Glik 16'; Mbappé 20'; Mendy (yellow card) 72'; Jemerson (yellow card) 82' (yellow-red card) 88'	Stadium: Stade de la Mosson; Attendance: 12,433; Referee: Mikael Lesage

11 February 2017 25	Nancy	0–3	Montpellier	Tomblaine
20:00 CET (UTC+1)	Robic (yellow card) 30'; Badila (yellow card) 39'; Aït Bennasser (yellow card) 75'	Report	Mbenza 10' 60'; Mounié 19'; Mukiele (yellow card) 56'; Pokorný (yellow card) 70'	Stadium: Stade Marcel Picot; Attendance: 17,611; Referee: (France) Sébastien Desiage

5 February 2017 26	Montpellier	2–1	Saint-Étienne	Saint-Étienne
21:00 CEST (UTC+2)	Lasne 49'; Mounié 51'	Report	Monnet-Paquet 12'	Stadium: Stade Geoffroy-Guichard; Attendance: 12,435; Referee: François Letexier

24 February 2017 27	Nice	2–1	Montpellier	Nice
20:45 CET (UTC+1)	Belhanda (yellow card) 49'; Le Bihan 68', 85'; Dalbert (yellow card) 71'	Report	Mounié 9'; Sylla (yellow card) 85'	Stadium: Allian Riviera; Attendance: 18,998; Referee: Frank Schneider

4 March 2017 28	Montpellier	1–1	Guingamp	Montpellier
20:00 CEST (UTC+01:00)	Mounié 50'; Syalla (yellow card) 86'	Report	Briand 85'	Stadium: Stade de la Mosson; Attendance: 9,182; Referee: (France) Jérôme Brisard

11 March 2017 29	Montpellier	2–3	Nantes	Montpellier
20:00 CET (UTC+1)	Mounié 12'; Boudebouz 84'	Report	Nakoulma 24', 68'; Sala 89'	Stadium: Stade de la Mosson; Attendance: 10,722; Referee: Karim Abed

18 March 2017 30	Bordeaux	5–1	Montpellier	Bordeaux
20:00 CET (UTC+1)	Rolán 25', 76'; Sankharé 29'; Vada 32' (pen.); Malcom 90+2'	Report	Boudebouz 47' (pen.); Congré (red card) 81'	Stadium: Matmut Atlantique; Attendance: 19,341; Referee: (France) Bartolomeu Varela

2 April 2017 31	Montpellier	0-1	Toulouse	Montpellier
17:00 CEST (UTC+02:00)	Skhiri (yellow card) 26'; Hilton (yellow card) 71'	Report	Delort 45'; Jean (yellow card) 47'; Bodiger (yellow card) 73'	Stadium: Stade de la Mosson; Attendance: 22,217; Referee: Tony Chapron

8 April 2017 32	Caen	0–2	Montpellier	Caen
20:00 CEST (UTC+01:00)	Guilbert (yellow card) 13'; Santini (yellow card) 50'; Vercoutre (yellow card) 77'; Yahia (yellow card) 77'	Summary	Sessègnon 49'; Congré (yellow card) 55'; Boudebouz (yellow card) 56'; Ikoné (yellow card) 77', (goal) 88'	Stadium: Stade Michel d'Ornano; Attendance: 17,286; Referee: (France) Frank Schneider

15 April 2017 33	Montpellier	2–0	Lorient	Montpellier
20:00	Boudebouz 8'; Mbenza 27'; Mounié (yellow card) 76'	Summary	Bellugou (yellow card) 2'; Peybernes (yellow card) 55'	Stadium: Stade de la Mosson; Attendance: 9,294; Referee: (France) Olivier Thual

22 April 2017 34	Paris Saint-Germain	2–0	Montpellier	Paris
17:00 CEST (UTC+2)	Cavani 29'; Di María 48', (yellow card) 68'	Report		Stadium: Parc des Princes; Attendance: 45,778; Referee: Mikael Lesage

29 April 2017 35	Montpellier	0–3	Lille	Montpellier
20:00 CEST (UTC+02:00)	Roussillon (yellow card) 59'	Report	de Préville 13' (pen.); Xeka 56'; Martin Terrier 75'	Stadium: Stade de la Mosson; Attendance: 10,139; Referee: Benoît Bastien

7 May 2017 36	Rennes	1–0	Montpellier	Rennes
15:00 CEST (UTC+02:00)	Mendes (yellow card) 42'; Baal (yellow card) 72'; Mubele 80'; Fernandes (yellow card) 83'	Report	Congré (yellow card) 26'; Boudebouz (yellow card) 83'	Stadium: Roazhon Park; Attendance: 18,308; Referee: Sébastien Desiage

14 May 2017 37	Montpellier	1–3	Lyon	Montpellier
21:00 CEST (UTC+2)	Mounié 35'; Mukiele (yellow card) 38'; Sessègnon (yellow card) 41'; Sylla (yellow card) 50'	Report	Fekir 17'; Lacazette 22', 90+5'; Depay (yellow card) 38'	Stadium: Stade de la Mosson; Attendance: 13,923; Referee: (France) Frank Letexier

20 May 2017 38	Angers	2–0	Montpellier	Angers
21:00 CEST (UTC+2)	Bamba 82'; Tait 88'	Report	Pokorný (yellow card) 24'; Passi (yellow card) 28'	Stadium: Stade Raymond Kopa; Attendance: 11,860; Referee: Lionel Jaffredo

=== Coupe de la Ligue ===
13 December 2016 Round of 16	Nantes	3–1	Montpellier	Nantes
18:45	Sala 18', 43'; Stępiński 62'	Report	Bérigaud 36'	Stadium: Stade de la Beaujoire; Attendance: 16,249; Referee: Ruddy Buquet

=== Coupe de France ===
8 January 2017 Round of 64	Lyon	5–0	Montpellier	Décines-Charpieu
21:00 CEST (UTC+2)	Lacazette 4'; Diakhaby 9'; Fekir 42'; Cornet 70', 75'	Summary	Marveaux (yellow card) 24'; Lasne (yellow card) 45+1'; Hilton (yellow card) 65'	Stadium: Parc Olympique Lyonnais; Attendance: 12,096; Referee: (France) François Letexier
