= 2014–15 Montpellier HSC season =

Montpellier
2014–15 season
- Chairman: Laurent Nicollin
- Manager: Rolland Courbis
- Stadium: Stade de la Mosson; Altrad Stadium (temporary)
- Ligue 1: 7th
- Coupe de France: Round of 64 (vs Paris Saint-Germain)
- Coupe de la Ligue: Round of 32 (vs Ajaccio)
- Top goalscorer: League: Lucas Barrios (11); All: Lucas Barrios (11)
- Highest home attendance: 27,930 vs Paris Saint-Germain (16 May 2015)
- Lowest home attendance: 7,386 vs Ajaccio (28 October 2014) *at Altrad Stadium
Home colours	Away colours	Third colours

The 2014–15 Montpellier HSC season was the 40th professional season of the club since its creation in 1974. The club celebrated their 40th anniversary with a change to the club badge representing a '40' in its center, which was used during the 2014–15 season.

== First team squad ==
French teams are limited to four players without EU citizenship. Hence, the squad list includes only the principal nationality of each player; several non-European players on the squad have dual citizenship with an EU country. Also, players from the ACP countries—countries in Africa, the Caribbean, and the Pacific that are signatories to the Cotonou Agreement—are not counted against non-EU quotas due to the Kolpak ruling.

Note: Flags indicate national team as defined under FIFA eligibility rules; some limited exceptions apply. Players may hold more than one non-FIFA nationality.

No.	Pos.	Nation	Player
1	GK	FRA	Laurent Pionnier
3	DF	FRA	Daniel Congré
4	DF	BRA	Vitorino Hilton (captain)
5	DF	CIV	Siaka Tiéné
6	MF	FRA	Joris Marveaux
7	FW	FRA	Anthony Mounier
8	MF	FRA	Jonas Martin
9	FW	FRA	Kévin Bérigaud
10	FW	PAR	Lucas Barrios (on loan from Spartak Moscow)
12	FW	FRA	Florian Sotoca
13	DF	SUI	Dylan Gissi
14	MF	FRA	Bryan Dabo
16	GK	FRA	Geoffrey Jourdren
17	MF	FRA	Paul Lasne

No.	Pos.	Nation	Player
18	FW	MAR	Karim Aït-Fana
19	FW	SEN	Souleymane Camara
20	MF	FRA	Morgan Sanson
21	DF	MAR	Abdelhamid El Kaoutari
22	MF	SUI	Sébastien Wüthrich
23	MF	TUN	Jamel Saihi
25	DF	FRA	Mathieu Deplagne
27	FW	FRA	Steve Mounié
28	FW	FRA	Djamel Bakar
29	MF	FRA	Gianni Seraf
30	GK	FRA	Jonathan Ligali
31	FW	FRA	Quentin Cornette
32	DF	FRA	Nicolas Saint-Ruf
33	MF	FRA	Anthony Ribelin

== Out on loan ==
Note: Flags indicate national team as defined under FIFA eligibility rules; some limited exceptions apply. Players may hold more than one non-FIFA nationality.

No.	Pos.	Nation	Player
--	DF	MAR	Yassine Jebbour (on loan to Varese)
--	FW	PER	Jean Deza (on loan to Alianza Lima)

== Competitions ==
=== Ligue 1 ===
==== League table ====
Pos	Team	Pld	W	D	L	GF	GA	GD	Pts	Qualification or relegation
5	Saint-Étienne	38	19	12	7	51	30	+21	69	Qualification for the Europa League third qualifying round (Note: Since winners of the 2014–15 Coupe de la Ligue, Paris Saint-Germain, qualified for European competition based on their league position, the spot awarded to the Coupe de la Ligue winner (Europa League third qualifying round) is passed to the next best team in the table not already qualified for any European competition (in this case, the fifth-placed team).)
6	Bordeaux	38	17	12	9	47	44	+3	63	Qualification for the Europa League third qualifying round
7	Montpellier	38	16	8	14	46	39	+7	56	
8	Lille	38	16	8	14	43	42	+1	56	
9	Rennes	38	13	11	14	35	42	−7	50	

Source: Ligue 1
Rules for classification: 1) points; 2) goal difference; 3) number of goals scored

==== Results summary ====
Overall								Home						Away					
Pld	W	D	L	GF	GA	GD	Pts	W	D	L	GF	GA	GD	W	D	L	GF	GA	GD
38	16	8	14	46	39	+7	56	11	2	6	30	21	+9	5	6	8	16	18	−2

Last updated: 5 June 2015.
Source: Competitive matches

==== Results by round ====
Round	1	2	3	4	5	6	7	8	9	10	11	12	13	14	15	16	17	18	19	20	21	22	23	24	25	26	27	28	29	30	31	32	33	34	35	36	37	38
Ground	H	A	H	A	H	A	H	H	A	A	A	H	A	H	A	H	A	H	A	H	A	H	A	H	A	A	H	H	H	A	H	A	H	A	H	A	H	A
Result	L	W	W	L	W	D	L	W	D	L	L	W	L	W	D	L	W	D	D	W	W	W	D	L	D	W	W	L	W	L	W	L	W	L	D	W	L	L
Position	17	11	5	10	6	6	9	7	7	11	13	9	13	9	9	10	8	9	10	8	6	6	6	7	7	7	6	7	7	7	7	7	7	7	7	7	7	7

Source: Ligue1
A = Away; H = Home; W = Win; D = Draw; L = Loss
Notes: Match 25 versus Monaco was postponed and later played on 7 April 2015. It should appear between rounds 31 & 32.

==== Matches ====
Win Draw Loss

9 August 2014 1	Montpellier	0–1	Bordeaux	Montpellier
21:00 CEST (UTC+02:00)	Gissi (yellow card) 7'; Sanson (yellow card) 62'	Report	Diabaté 14'; Sertić (yellow card) 33'; Pallois (yellow card) 71'	Stadium: Stade de la Mosson; Attendance: 15,190; Referee: Wilfried Bien

17 August 2014 2	Marseille	0–2	Montpellier	Marseille
17:00 CEST (UTC+02:00)	Dja Djédjé (yellow card) 58'	Report	Mounier 18'; Sanson 68'	Stadium: Stade Vélodrome; Attendance: 50,774; Referee: Clément Turpin

23 August 2014 3	Montpellier	2–0	Metz	Montpellier
20:00 CEST (UTC+02:00)	Tiéné 44'; Camara 89'	Report	Milán (yellow card) 54'; Ngbakoto (yellow card) 59'	Stadium: Stade de la Mosson; Attendance: 12,337; Referee: Antony Gautier

30 August 2014 4	Nantes	1–0	Montpellier	Nantes
20:00 CEST (UTC+02:00)	Hansen (yellow card) 2'; Gakpé (yellow card) 77', (goal) 78'	Report		Stadium: Stade de la Beaujoire; Attendance: 21,559; Referee: Frank Schneider

13 September 2014 5	Montpellier	1–0	Lorient	Montpellier
20:00 CEST (UTC+02:00)	Koné 44' (o.g.); Martin (yellow card) 77'	Report	Lautoa (yellow card) 36'; Abdullah (yellow card) 80'	Stadium: Stade de la Mosson; Attendance: 12,106; Referee: Fredy Fautrel

21 September 2014 6	Lille	0–0	Montpellier	Villeneuve-d'Ascq
14:00 CEST		Report		Stadium: Stade Pierre-Mauroy; Attendance: 31,742; Referee: Olivier Thual

24 September 2014 7	Montpellier	0–1	Monaco	Montpellier
19:00 CEST (UTC+02:00)	Montaño (yellow card) 86'	Report	Fabinho (yellow card) 69'; Germain 90+3'	Stadium: Stade de la Mosson; Attendance: 11,570; Referee: Alexandre Castro

27 September 2014 8	Montpellier	2–1	Guingamp	Montpellier
20:00 CEST (UTC+02:00)	Camara 48'; Montaño 89'	Report	Yatabaré (yellow card) 8'; Diallo (yellow card) 53'; Beauvue 83'; Samassa (red card) 89'; Sankharé (yellow card) 90'	Stadium: Stade de la Mosson; Attendance: 10,282; Referee: Philippe Kalt

4 October 2014 9	Nice	1–1	Montpellier	Nice
20:00 CEST (UTC+02:00)	Bodmer (yellow card) 75'; Palun 90+2'	Report	Tiéné (yellow card) 54'; Hilton (yellow card) 67', (goal) 72'; Montaño (yellow card) 90'	Stadium: Allianz Riviera; Attendance: 19,634; Referee: Wilfried Bien

19 October 2014 10	Lyon	5–1	Montpellier	Lyon
21:00 CEST (UTC+02:00)	Gonalons (yellow card) 21'; Gourcuff 36', 47'; Fekir 38', (yellow card) 60'; Umtiti (yellow card) 53'; Ferri (yellow card) 63'; Biševac (yellow card) 65'; Lacazette (yellow card) 71', (goal) 82'; Malbranque 88'	Report	Congré (yellow card) 27'; Martin (yellow card) 49'; Tiéné 54'; El Kaoutari (yellow card) 55'	Stadium: Stade de Gerland; Attendance: 35,688; Referee: Bartolomeu Varela

25 October 2014 11	Reims	1–0	Montpellier	Reims
20:00 CEST (UTC+02:00)	Devaux (yellow card) 26'; Conte (yellow card) 54'; Moukandjo 90', (yellow card) 90+1'	Report		Stadium: Stade Auguste Delaune; Attendance: 11,331; Referee: Benoît Millot

1 November 2014 12	Montpellier	2–0	Evian	Montpellier
20:00 CET (UTC+01:00)	Bérigaud 32', (yellow card) 64'; Mounier 90'; Deplagne 90+2'	Report	Tejeda (yellow card) 30'	Stadium: Altrad Stadium; Attendance: 8,440; Referee: Mikael Lesage

8 November 2014 13	Bastia	2–0	Montpellier	Bastia
20:00 CET (UTC+01:00)	Tallo 21', 45+1', (yellow card) 60'; Palmieri (yellow card) 34'	Report	Saihi (yellow card) 37'; Tiéné (yellow card) 37'; Sanson (yellow card) 79'	Stadium: Stade Armand Cesari; Attendance: 11,556; Referee: Lionel Jaffredo

23 November 2014 14	Montpellier	2–0	Toulouse	Montpellier
17:00 CET (UTC+01:00)	Mounier 37'; Bérigaud (yellow card) 54'; Camara 87'	Report	Didot (yellow card) 56'; Aguilar (yellow card) 69'	Stadium: Altrad Stadium; Attendance: 9,270; Referee: Sébastien Desiage

29 November 2014 15	Caen	1–1	Montpellier	Caen
20:00 CET (UTC+01:00)	Duhamel 40'; Féret (yellow card) 62'; Adeoti (yellow card) 86'	Report	Hilton 17'	Stadium: Stade Michel d'Ornano; Attendance: 14,976; Referee: Wilfried Bien

3 December 2014 16	Montpellier	0–2	Saint-Étienne	Montpellier
19:00 CET (UTC+01:00)	Marveaux (yellow card) 29'; Deplagne (yellow card) 63'	Report	Pogba 22'; Diomande (yellow card) 27' (yellow-red card) 78'; Baysse 43'	Stadium: Altrad Stadium; Attendance: 10,425; Referee: Olivier Thual

6 December 2014 17	Rennes	0–4	Montpellier	Rennes
20:00 CET (UTC+01:00)	Hosiner (yellow card) 39'; André (yellow card) 70'	Report	Martin 23'; Lasne (yellow card) 26'; Sanson 55'; Barrios 60'; Mounier 90+2'	Stadium: Route de Lorient; Attendance: 16,123; Referee: Amaury Delerue

13 December 2014 18	Montpellier	3–3	Lens	Montpellier
20:00 CET (UTC+01:00)	Sanson 1'; Barrios 16'; Saihi (yellow card) 50'; Mounier 63', (yellow card) 63'	Report	Valdivia 18'; Sylla (yellow card) 33'; Guillaume 34'; Bourigeaud (yellow card) 56'; Touzghar 80'	Stadium: Altrad Stadium; Attendance: 9,784; Referee: Saïd Ennjimi

20 December 2014 19	Paris Saint-Germain	0–0	Montpellier	Paris
17:00 CET (UTC+01:00)	Thiago Silva (yellow card) 4'	Report	El Kaoutari (yellow card) 21'; Saihi (yellow card) 52'; Martin (yellow card) 81'; Ligali (yellow card) 87'	Stadium: Parc des Princes; Attendance: 46,157; Referee: Sébastien Moreira

9 January 2015 20	Montpellier	2–1	Marseille	Montpellier
20:30 CEST (UTC+02:00)	Bérigaud 36'; Lasne 62'	Report	Mendy (yellow card) 18'; Omrani 68' (yellow card) 71'; Thauvin (yellow card) 78'	Stadium: Stade de la Mosson; Attendance: 20,840; Referee: Benoît Bastien

17 January 2015 21	Metz	2–3	Montpellier	Metz
20:00 CET (UTC+01:00)	Ngbakoto 20' (pen.); Bussmann 38'	Report	Barrios 17' (pen.); Dabo (yellow card) 17'	Stadium: Stade Saint-Symphorien; Attendance: 16,786; Referee: Alexandre Castro

24 January 2015 22	Montpellier	4–0	Nantes	Montpellier
20:00 CET (UTC+01:00)	Lasne 8'; Bérigaud 57'; Mounier 78'; Barrios 82'	Report	Djidji (yellow card) 48'; Veretout (yellow card) 90+3'	Stadium: Stade de la Mosson; Attendance: 11,037; Referee: Clément Turpin

31 January 2015 23	Lorient	0–0	Montpellier	Lorient
20:00 CET (UTC+01:00)	Bellugou (yellow card) 66'; Lavigne (yellow card) 80'	Report	Deplagne (yellow card) 81'	Stadium: Stade du Moustoir; Attendance: 11,549; Referee: Olivier Thual

7 February 2015 24	Montpellier	1–2	Lille	Montpellier
20:00 CET (UTC+01:00)	Dabo 90+2'	Report	Roux 9'; Mavuba (yellow card) 31'; Lopes 53'	Stadium: Stade de la Mosson; Attendance: 10,365; Referee: Sébastien Moreira

22 February 2015 26	Guingamp	0–2	Montpellier	Guingamp
14:00 CET (UTC+01:00)		Report	Sanson 2'; Bérigaud 55'; Tiéné (yellow card) 87'	Stadium: Stade du Roudourou; Attendance: 13,942; Referee: Alexandre Castro

1 March 2015 27	Montpellier	2–1	Nice	Montpellier
17:00 CET (UTC+01:00)	Deplagne (yellow card) 35'; Dabo 45'; Barrios 66'; Jourdren (yellow card) 86'; Marveaux (yellow card) 89'	Report	Carlos Eduardo (yellow card) 15'; Rafetraniaina (yellow card) 18'; Bauthéac 36' (pen.); Hult (yellow card) 39'; Eysseric (yellow card) 88'	Stadium: Stade de la Mosson; Attendance: 12,083; Referee: Ruddy Buquet

8 March 2015 28	Montpellier	1–5	Lyon	Montpellier
21:00 CEST (UTC+02:00)	Barrios 6'; Deplagne (yellow card) 26'; El Kaoutari (yellow card) 28'; Jourdren (yellow card) 29'; Sanson (yellow card) 63'	Report	Lacazette (yellow card) 9', (goal) 30' (pen.), 90+4'; Fekir 40', 72'; Jallet (yellow card) 45'; Rose (yellow card) 59'; Bedimo (yellow card) 65'; Umtiti (yellow card) 81'; Tolisso 90+1'	Stadium: Stade de la Mosson; Attendance: 16,431; Referee: Amaury Delerue

14 March 2015 29	Montpellier	3–1	Reims	Montpellier
20:00 CET (UTC+01:00)	Lucas Barrios 4', 73'; Dabo (yellow card) 48'; Sanson 90+2'	Report	Charbonnier (yellow card) 7'; Oniangue 87'	Stadium: Stade de la Mosson; Attendance: 11,250; Referee: Fredy Fautrel

21 March 2015 30	Evian	1–0	Montpellier	Annecy
20:00 CET (UTC+01:00)	Mongongu (yellow card) 23'; N'Sikulu 85'; Thomasson (yellow card) 88'	Report		Stadium: Parc des Sports; Attendance: 8,730; Referee: Mikaël Lesage

4 April 2015 31	Montpellier	3–1	Bastia	Montpellier
20:00 CEST (UTC+02:00)	Barrios 69' (pen.); Mounier 72'; Marveaux (yellow card) 87'; Sanson 90+1'	Report	Sio 35'; Modesto (yellow card) 68'; Palmieri (yellow card) 70'	Stadium: Stade de la Mosson; Attendance: 11,349; Referee: Alexandre Castro

7 April 2015 25	Monaco	0–0	Montpellier	Monaco
19:00 CEST (UTC+02:00)	Martial (yellow card) 59'	Report	Dabo (yellow card) 72'; Congré (yellow card) 90'	Stadium: Stade Louis II; Attendance: 5,676; Referee: Saïd Ennjimi

12 April 2015 32	Toulouse	1–0	Montpellier	Toulouse
17:00 CEST (UTC+02:00)	Ninkov (yellow card) 27'; Trejo 45+2'; Doumbia (yellow card) 55'	Report	Hilton (yellow card) 77'; Deplagne (yellow card) 85'	Stadium: Stadium Municipal; Attendance: 18,734; Referee: Wilfried Bien

18 April 2015 33	Montpellier	1–0	Caen	Montpellier
17:00 CEST (UTC+02:00)	Hilton 4'; Congré (yellow card) 69'	Report	Bazile (yellow card) 67'	Stadium: Stade de la Mosson; Attendance: 11,308; Referee: Antony Gautier

25 April 2015 34	Saint-Étienne	1–0	Montpellier	Saint-Étienne
14:00 CEST (UTC+02:00)	Gradel 20'; Clement (yellow card) 31'	Report	Congré (yellow card) 49'; Dabo (yellow card) 67'	Stadium: Stade Geoffroy-Guichard; Attendance: 35,231; Referee: Benoit Bastien

2 May 2015 35	Montpellier	0–0	Rennes	Montpellier
20:00 CEST (UTC+02:00)	Bérigaud (yellow card) 31'; Hilton (red card) 90+2'	Report		Stadium: Stade de la Mosson; Attendance: 12,074; Referee: Frank Schneider

10 May 2015 36	Lens	0–1	Montpellier	Amiens
14:00 CEST (UTC+02:00)	Landre (yellow card) 55' (yellow-red card) 65'	Report	Martin (yellow card) 58'; Tiéné (yellow card) 86'; Mounier 90+2'	Stadium: Stade de la Licorne; Attendance: 8,343; Referee: Mikael Lesage

16 May 2015 37	Montpellier	1–2	Paris Saint-Germain	Montpellier
21:00 CEST (UTC+02:00)	Mounier 40'; Hilton (yellow card) 45+1'; Deplagne (yellow card) 51'; Dabo (yellow card) 62'	Report	Matuidi 17'; Lavezzi 25'; Pastore (yellow card) 45+1'; Rabiot (yellow card) 53'; Cabaye (yellow card) 63'; Aurier (yellow card) 67'; Marquinhos (yellow card) 90'	Stadium: Stade de la Mosson; Attendance: 27,930; Referee: Fredy Fautrel

23 May 2015 38	Bordeaux	2–1	Montpellier	Bordeaux
21:00 CEST (UTC+02:00)	Rolán 9', 39'	Report	Martin (yellow card) 55'; Bakar 63'	Stadium: Stade Bordeaux-Atlantique; Attendance: 40,215; Referee: (France) Benoît Bastien

=== Coupe de la Ligue ===
28 October 2014 Round of 32	Montpellier	0–1	Ajaccio	Montpellier
20:00 CEST (UTC+02:00)	Hilton (yellow card) 36'; Mounier (yellow card) 78'	Report	Abergel (yellow card) 37'; Madri 44'	Stadium: Altrad Stadium; Attendance: 7,386; Referee: Sébastien Moreira

=== Coupe de France ===
5 January 2015 Round of 64	Montpellier	0–3	Paris Saint-Germain	Montpellier
20:45 CET (UTC+01:00)	Marveaux (yellow card) 48'	Report	Ibrahimović (yellow card) 25', (goal) 79'; Cabaye (yellow card) 42'; Chantôme (yellow card) 50', (goal) 63'; Verratti (yellow card) 84'; Lucas 90'	Stadium: Stade de la Mosson
