= Ellyes Skhiri =

Footballer (born 1995)

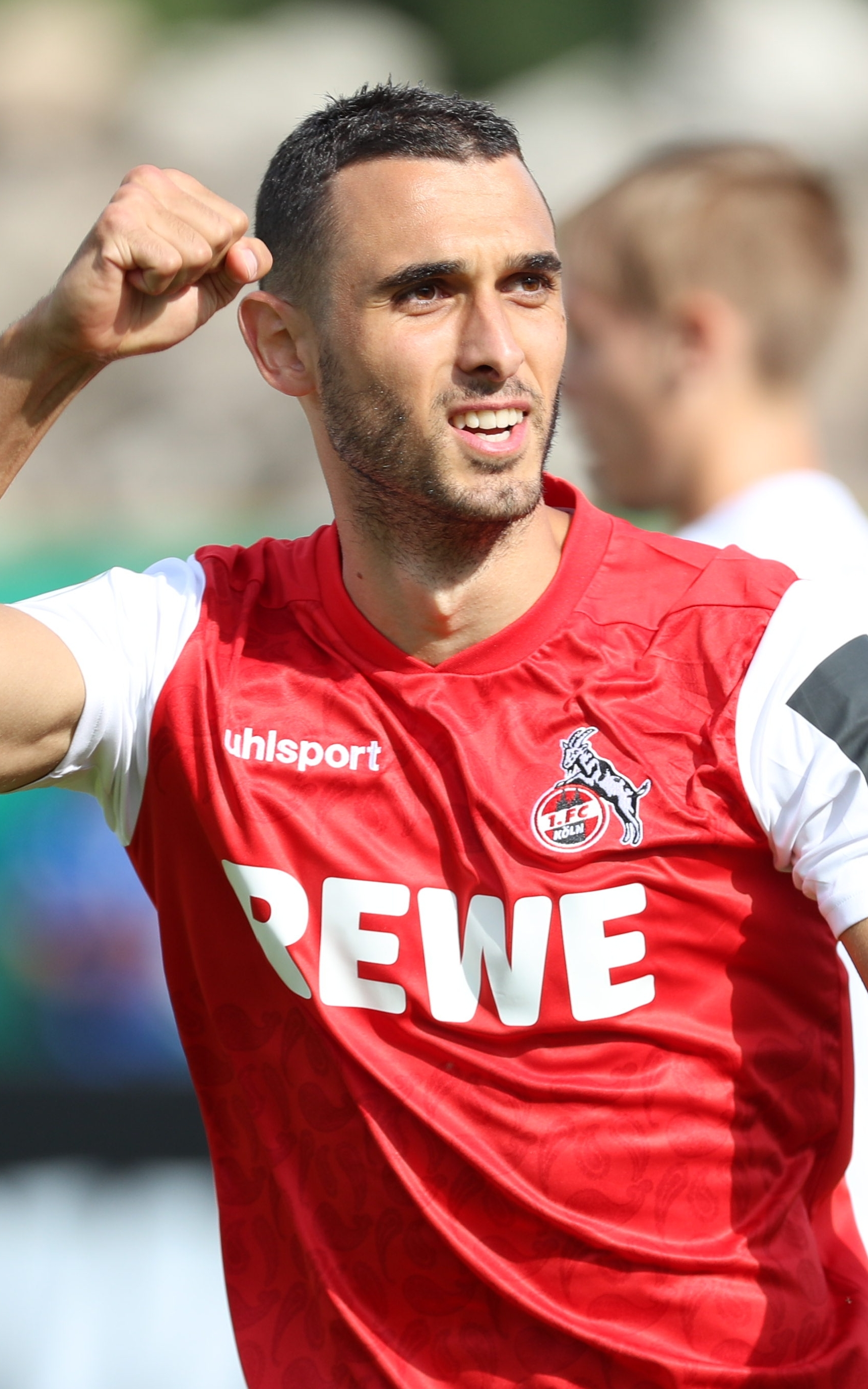
- Skhiri playing for 1. FC Köln in 2021

Personal information
- Full name: Ellyes Joris Skhiri
- Date of birth: 10 May 1995 (age 31)
- Place of birth: Lunel, France
- Height: 1.85 m (6 ft 1 in)
- Position: Defensive midfielder

Team information
- Current team: 1. FC Köln
- Number: 6

Youth career
- 1999–2010: Gallia Club Lunel
- 2010–2014: Montpellier

Senior career*
Years	Team	Apps	(Gls)
2014–2015	Montpellier B	57	(3)
2015–2019	Montpellier	123	(10)
2019–2023	1. FC Köln	118	(17)
2023–2026	Eintracht Frankfurt	82	(3)
2026–	1. FC Köln	4	(0)

International career
2014	Tunisia U23	1	(0)
2018–2026	Tunisia	86	(4)
- * Club domestic league appearances and goals as of 17:30, 11 October 2026 (UTC)

Ellyes Joris Skhiri (Arabic: إلياس السخيري; born 10 May 1995) is a professional footballer who plays as a defensive midfielder for Bundesliga club 1. FC Köln. Born in France, he plays for the Tunisia national team.

== Club career ==
=== Montpellier ===
Skhiri is a youth product of Montpellier HSC. He made his Ligue 1 debut on 21 March 2015 against Evian Thonon Gaillard replacing Paul Lasne in stoppage time in a 1–0 away defeat.

=== 1. FC Köln ===
On 29 July 2019, Skhiri joined 1. FC Köln on a four-year deal. On 28 November 2020, he scored a brace in a 2–1 away win over Borussia Dortmund.

=== Eintracht Frankfurt ===
On 5 July 2023, Skhiri signed a four-year contract with fellow Bundesliga club Eintracht Frankfurt. A month later, on 31 August, he scored his first goal in a 2–0 win over Levski Sofia in the 2023–24 Conference League play-off round second leg, which qualified his club to the group phase.

=== Return to 1. FC Köln ===
On 21 August 2026, Skhiri rejoined 1. FC Köln, signing a two-year contract.

== International career ==
Skhiri was born and raised in France to a Tunisian father and French mother. He was called up to the Tunisia Olympic team several times. Skhiri made his debut for the Tunisia Olympic team in a friendly against the Morocco U23 squad.

Skhiri made his senior debut for the Tunisia national football team in a friendly 1–0 win over Iran on 23 March 2018.

In June 2018, he was named in Tunisia's 23-man squad for the 2018 World Cup in Russia. He was part of the national team which reached the semi-finals of the 2019 Africa Cup of Nations. In November 2022, he was called up for the 2022 FIFA World Cup in Qatar. Skhiri was called up to the national team for the 2023 Africa Cup of Nations.

On 15 May 2026, Skhiri was named in the Tunisia squad for the 2026 FIFA World Cup.

== Career statistics ==
=== Club ===
As of match played 11 October 2026

Appearances and goals by club, season and competition
Club	Season	League			National cup (Note: Includes DFB-Pokal, Coupe de France)		League cup (Note: Includes Coupe de la Ligue)		Europe		Other		Total	
Club	Season	Division	Apps	Goals	Apps	Goals	Apps	Goals	Apps	Goals	Apps	Goals	Apps	Goals
Montpellier	2014–15	Ligue 1	2	0	0	0	0	0	—		—		2	0
Montpellier	2015–16	Ligue 1	12	2	0	0	1	0	—		—		13	2
Montpellier	2016–17	Ligue 1	37	1	1	0	1	0	—		—		39	1
Montpellier	2017–18	Ligue 1	35	4	2	0	4	0	—		—		41	4
Montpellier	2018–19	Ligue 1	37	3	1	0	0	0	—		—		38	3
Montpellier	Total		123	10	4	0	6	0	—		—		133	10
1. FC Köln	2019–20	Bundesliga	32	1	1	0	—		—		—		33	1
1. FC Köln	2020–21	Bundesliga	32	5	3	0	—		—		2 (Note: Appearances in Bundesliga relegation play-offs)	1	35	5
1. FC Köln	2021–22	Bundesliga	22	4	1	1	—		—		—		23	5
1. FC Köln	2022–23	Bundesliga	32	7	1	0	—		7 (Note: Appearances in UEFA Europa Conference League)	1	—		40	8
1. FC Köln	Total		118	17	6	1	—		7	1	2	1	133	20
Eintracht Frankfurt	2023–24	Bundesliga	27	2	2	1	—		9	2	—		38	5
Eintracht Frankfurt	2024–25	Bundesliga	30	1	3	0	—		12 (Note: Appearances in UEFA Europa League)	1	—		45	2
Eintracht Frankfurt	2025–26	Bundesliga	25	0	1	0	—		8 (Note: Appearances in UEFA Champions League)	0	—		34	0
Eintracht Frankfurt	Total		82	3	6	1	—		29	3	—		117	7
1. FC Köln	2026–27	Bundesliga	4	0	1	0	—		—		—		5	0
Career total			327	30	17	2	6	0	36	4	2	1	388	37

=== International ===
Appearances and goals by national team and year
National team	Year	Apps	Goals
Tunisia	2018	13	0
Tunisia	2019	15	0
Tunisia	2020	4	0
Tunisia	2021	8	3
Tunisia	2022	12	0
Tunisia	2023	8	0
Tunisia	2024	10	0
Tunisia	2025	8	1
Tunisia	2026	8	0
Total		86	4

Scores and results list Tunisia's goal tally first, score column indicates score after each Skhiri goal.

List of international goals scored by Ellyes Skhiri
No.	Date	Venue	Opponent	Score	Result	Competition
1.	25 March 2021	Martyrs of February Stadium, Benghazi, Libya	Libya	1–1	5–2	2021 Africa Cup of Nations qualification
2.	3 September 2021	Stade Olympique Hammadi Agrebi, Tunis, Tunisia	Equatorial Guinea	2–0	3–0	2022 FIFA World Cup qualification
3.	7 October 2021	Stade Olympique Hammadi Agrebi, Tunis, Tunisia	Mauritania	1–0	3–0	2022 FIFA World Cup qualification
4.	23 December 2025	Rabat Olympic Stadium, Rabat, Morocco	Uganda	1–0	3–1	2025 Africa Cup of Nations

== Honours ==
Tunisia

- Africa Cup of Nations 4th place: 2019

Individual

- Tunisian Footballer of the Year: 2021
