= Marveaux =

Marveaux is a surname. Notable people with the surname include:

- Joris Marveaux (born 1982), French-Martiniquais footballer, brother of Sylvain
- Sylvain Marveaux (born 1986), French footballer
