= Laurent Pionnier =

French footballer (born 1982)

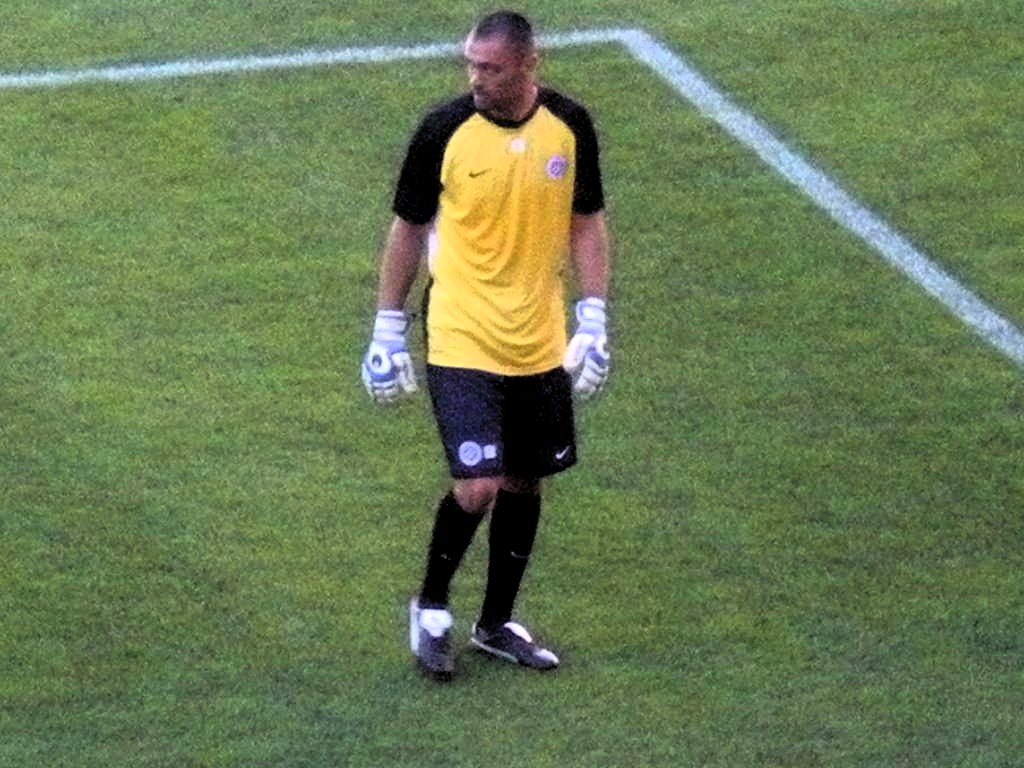
- Pionnier with Montpellier in 2012

Personal information
- Date of birth: 24 May 1982 (age 44)
- Place of birth: Bagnols-sur-Cèze, France
- Height: 1.84 m (6 ft 0 in)
- Position: Goalkeeper

Youth career
- Montpellier

Senior career*
Years	Team	Apps	(Gls)
2002–2018	Montpellier	151	(0)
2008	→ Libourne (loan)	17	(0)
Total		168	(0)
- * Club domestic league appearances and goals

Laurent Pionnier (born 24 May 1982) is a French former professional footballer who played as a goalkeeper.

== Career statistics ==
=== Club ===
Appearances, goals, and clean sheets by club, season, and competition
Club	Season	League			National cup		League cup		Europe		Other		Total	
Club	Season	Division	Apps	Goals	Apps	Goals	Apps	Goals	Apps	Goals	Apps	Goals	Apps	Goals
Montpellier	2000–01	Division 2	0	0	0	0	0	0	—		—		0	0
Montpellier	2001–02	Division 1	0	0	0	0	0	0	—		—		0	0
Montpellier	2002–03	Ligue 1	9	0	0	0	0	0	—		—		9	0
Montpellier	2003–04	Ligue 1	3	0	0	0	0	0	—		—		3	0
Montpellier	2004–05	Ligue 2	8	0	0	0	4	0	—		—		12	0
Montpellier	2005–06	Ligue 2	34	0	5	0	4	0	—		—		43	0
Montpellier	2006–07	Ligue 2	26	0	0	0	1	0	—		—		27	0
Montpellier	2007–08	Ligue 2	0	0	3	0	0	0	—		—		3	0
Montpellier	2008–09	Ligue 2	3	0	3	0	3	0	—		—		9	0
Montpellier	2009–10	Ligue 1	0	0	1	0	1	0	—		—		2	0
Montpellier	2010–11	Ligue 1	1	0	1	0	4	0	0	0	—		6	0
Montpellier	2011–12	Ligue 1	4	0	4	0	1	0	—		—		9	0
Montpellier	2012–13	Ligue 1	5	0	1	0	3	0	1	0	0	0	10	0
Montpellier	2013–14	Ligue 1	5	0	2	0	1	0	—		—		8	0
Montpellier	2014–15	Ligue 1	3	0	0	0	1	0	—		—		4	0
Montpellier	2015–16	Ligue 1	25	0	1	0	0	0	—		—		26	0
Montpellier	2016–17	Ligue 1	25	0	1	0	1	0	—		—		27	0
Montpellier	2017–18	Ligue 1	0	0	0	0	0	0	—		—		0	0
Montpellier	Total		151	0	22	0	24	0	1	0	0	0	198	0
Libourne (loan)	2007–08	Ligue 2	17	0	—		—		—		—		17	0
Career total			168	0	22	0	24	0	1	0	0	0	215	0

== Honours ==
Montpellier

- Ligue 1: 2011–12
