= Ryad Boudebouz =

Algerian footballer (born 1990)

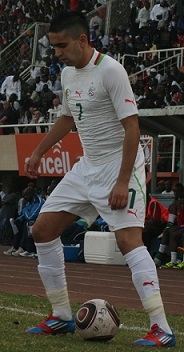
- Boudebouz with Algeria in 2012

Personal information
- Full name: Ryad Boudebouz
- Date of birth: 19 February 1990 (age 36)
- Place of birth: Colmar, France
- Height: 1.77 m (5 ft 10 in)
- Position: Attacking midfielder

Youth career
- 2000–2004: Colmar
- 2004–2008: Sochaux

Senior career*
Years	Team	Apps	(Gls)
2008–2013	Sochaux	164	(24)
2011–2012	Sochaux B	3	(0)
2013–2015	Bastia	66	(8)
2015–2017	Montpellier	71	(13)
2017–2019	Real Betis	36	(2)
2019	→ Celta (loan)	11	(1)
2019–2022	Saint-Étienne	68	(4)
2021	Saint-Étienne B	1	(1)
2022–2023	Al-Ahli	29	(9)
2023–2024	Ohod	26	(3)
2024–2026	JS Kabylie	42	(11)

International career^{‡}
2006	France U17	2	(0)
2008–2009	France U19	10	(1)
2025	Algeria A'	1	(0)
2010–2017	Algeria	25	(2)
- * Club domestic league appearances and goals as of 1 July 2026 ‡ National team caps and goals as of 15:35, 14 November 2025 (UTC)

Ryad Boudebouz (Arabic: رياض بودبوز; Tamazight: ⵔⵢⴰⴷ ⴱⵓⴷⴻⴱⵓⵣ; born 19 February 1990) is a professional footballer. Mainly an attacking midfielder, he can also play as a right winger.

A former France youth international, Boudebouz switched his allegiance to Algeria in 2010. He played for the Algeria national team at the 2010 FIFA World Cup and the 2013 Africa Cup of Nations. In total, Boudebouz scored two goals in twenty-five matches for Algeria from 2010 to 2017.

== Club career ==
Born in Colmar to Algerian parents, Boudebouz grew up in the 'Europe' district of the city. At age 10, he joined the junior ranks of local side Colmar where he stayed until age 14 when he joined Sochaux's youth academy. Boudebouz made his debut for the club's reserve side at the age of 16. On 15 May 2008, Boudebouz signed his first professional contract with the club agreeing to a three-year deal tying him to the club until 2011.

On 4 October 2008, Boudebouz made his first team debut for Sochaux, starting in a league match against Nice. On 8 November 2008, he scored his first career goal, the winner in a 2–1 victory against Le Mans.

On 2 September 2013 – the last day of the 2013–14 summer transfer window – Boudebouz signed a three-year contract with Corsica-based club SC Bastia, for a reported fee of €1 million.

After two seasons in Corsica, Boudebouz joined Montpellier with a four-year contract, as part of a deal that saw Yassine Jebbour join the Corsican team.

In January 2019, Boudebouz was loaned to Celta from Real Betis.

On 27 July 2019, Boudebouz signed a three-year deal to join Ligue 1 side Saint-Étienne which was reportedly worth €4 million. On 6 March 2020, he scored a stoppage time winner for Saint-Etienne in the Coupe de France semi-final to send the club into their first final in nearly 40 years.

On 8 September 2022, Boudebouz joined Saudi Arabian club Al-Ahli on a free transfer.

On 12 September 2023, Boudebouz joined Saudi First Division side Ohod on a two-year contract.

On 10 September 2024, Boudebouz signed a two-year contract, with JS Kabylie.

== International career ==
Boudebouz received a surprise call-up to the France under-21 squad, who were looking to start fresh after their elimination from the 2009 UEFA European Under-21 Football Championship, for a friendly against Denmark. However, Ryad decided to pass on the offer instead opting to play with the under-19 team who were in the process of qualifying for the 2009 UEFA European Under-19 Football Championship, in which they later progressed.

On 4 May 2010, Boudebouz was named to the Algeria national team 2010 World Cup preliminary squad. Boudebouz had been in the process of acquiring a passport to represent the nation of his parents since 2009. On 28 May 2010, Boudebouz made his debut for Algeria in a friendly against the Republic of Ireland. Starting the game on the bench, he was substituted in at the 65th minute. He was included in the final 23-man squad for the World Cup.

== Career statistics ==
=== Club ===
As of 28 March 2024

Team	Season	League			Cup (Note: Includes the Coupe de France and the Coupe de la Ligue)		Other		Total	
Team	Season	Division	Apps	Goals	Apps	Goals	Apps	Goals	Apps	Goals
Sochaux	2008–09	Ligue 1	25	3	2	0	—		27	3
Sochaux	2009–10	Ligue 1	31	3	5	4	—		36	7
Sochaux	2010–11	Ligue 1	38	8	2	0	—		40	8
Sochaux	2011–12	Ligue 1	36	6	2	0	2 (Note: Appearance(s) in the UEFA Europa League)	0	40	6
Sochaux	2012–13	Ligue 1	32	3	3	2	—		35	5
Sochaux	2013–14	Ligue 1	2	1	—		—		2	1
Sochaux	Total		164	24	14	6	2	0	180	30
Sochaux B	2010–11	CFA	1	0	—		—		1	0
Sochaux B	2012–13	CFA	2	0	—		—		2	0
Sochaux B	Total		3	0	—		—		3	0
Bastia	2013–14	Ligue 1	32	3	3	0	—		35	3
Bastia	2014–15	Ligue 1	34	5	4	0	—		38	5
Bastia	Total		66	8	7	0	—		73	8
Montpellier	2015–16	Ligue 1	38	2	1	0	—		39	2
Montpellier	2016–17	Ligue 1	33	11	1	0	—		34	11
Montpellier	Total		71	13	2	0	—		73	13
Real Betis	2017–18	La Liga	27	2	2	1	—		29	3
Real Betis	2018–19	La Liga	9	0	2	0	1	0	12	0
Real Betis	Total		36	2	4	0	1	0	41	3
Celta (loan)	2018–19	La Liga	11	1	0	0	—		11	1
Saint-Étienne	2019–20	Ligue 1	24	1	3	1	3	0	30	2
Saint-Étienne	2020–21	Ligue 1	14	0	1	0	—		15	0
Saint-Étienne	2021–22	Ligue 1	30	3	2	1	2 (Note: Appearances in the Ligue 1 relegation/promotion play-offs)	0	34	4
Saint-Étienne	Total		68	4	6	2	5	0	79	6
Saint-Étienne B	2021–22	National 3	1	1	—		—		1	1
Al-Ahli	2022–23	SFDL	27	9	—		—		27	9
Al-Ahli	2023–24	SPL	2	0	0	0	—		2	0
Al-Ahli	Total		29	9	0	0	0	0	29	9
Ohod	2023–24	SFDL	22	3	—		—		22	3
Career total			471	65	33	8	8	0	512	73

=== International ===
As of 5 November 2019

National team	Year	Apps	Goals
Algeria	2010	6	0
Algeria	2011	3	1
Algeria	2012	5	0
Algeria	2013	2	0
Algeria	2014	0	0
Algeria	2015	3	0
Algeria	2016	5	1
Algeria	2017	1	0
Total		25	2

==== International goals ====
Scores and results list Algeria's goal tally first.

No.	Date	Venue	Opponent	Score	Result	Competition
1.	12 November 2011	Mustapha Tchaker Stadium, Blida, Algeria	Tunisia	1–0	1–0	Friendly
2.	4 September 2016	Mustapha Tchaker Stadium, Blida, Algeria	Lesotho	5–0	6–0	2017 Africa Cup of Nations qualification

== Honours ==
FC Sochaux

- Coupe Gambardella: 2006–07

SC Bastia

- Coupe de la Ligue runner-up: 2014–15

AS Saint-Étienne

- Coupe de France runner-up: 2019–20

Al-Ahli FC

- Saudi First Division League: 2022–23
