= Jonathan Ligali =

French footballer (born 1991)

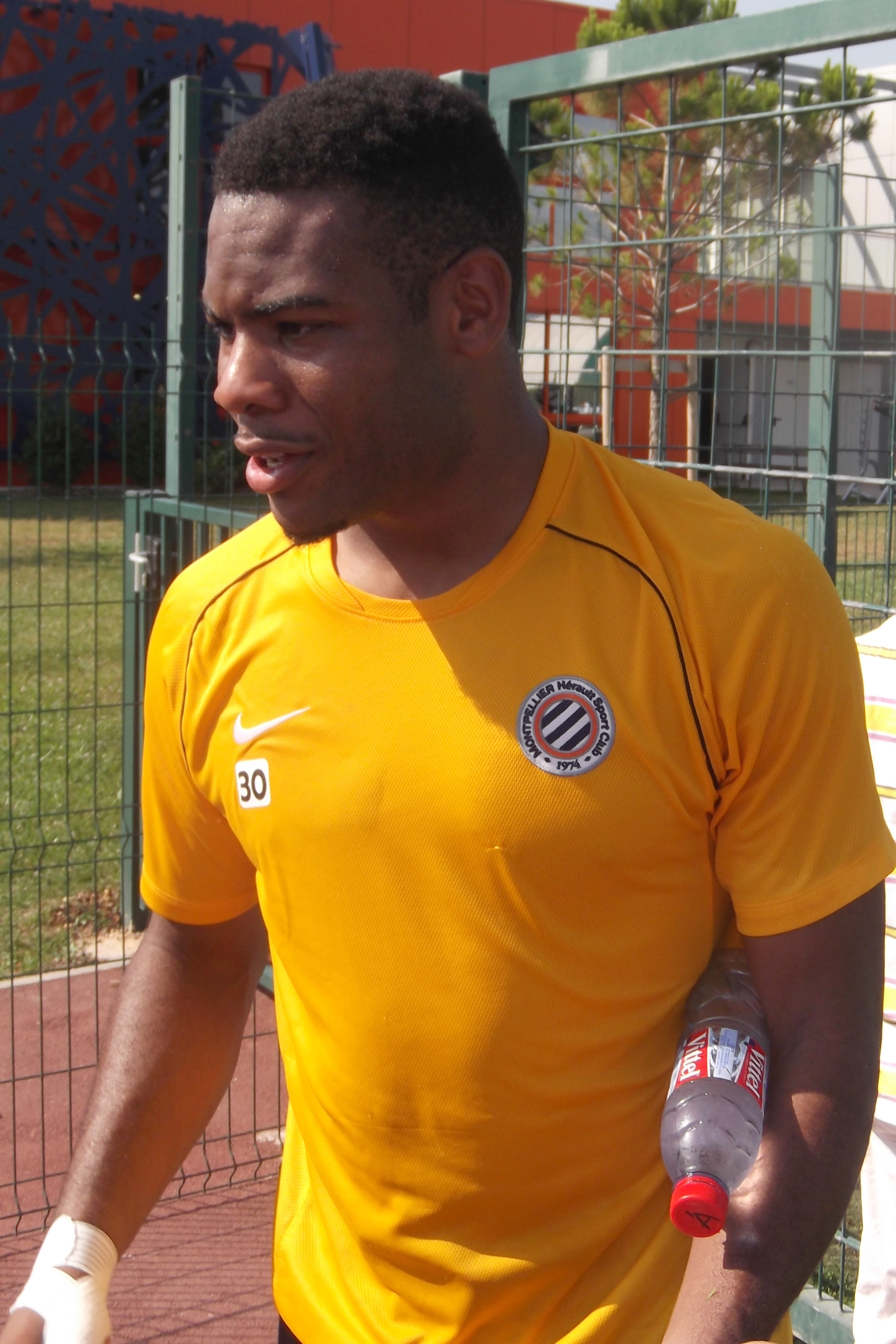

Personal information
- Date of birth: 28 May 1991 (age 35)
- Place of birth: Montpellier, France
- Height: 1.84 m (6 ft 0 in)
- Position: Goalkeeper

Youth career
- 1998–2003: SC Jacou
- 2003–2012: Montpellier

Senior career*
| Years | Team | Apps | (Gls) |
| 2012–2019 | Montpellier B | 72 | (0) |
| 2012–2019 | Montpellier | 13 | (0) |
| 2017–2018 | → Dunkerque (loan) | 29 | (0) |
| Total | | 114 | (0) |

International career
| 2009 | France U18 | 1 | (0) |
| 2009 | France U19 | 4 | (0) |
| 2010 | France U20 | 9 | (0) |
- * Club domestic league appearances and goals as of 15:51, 4 July 2018 (UTC)

Jonathan Ligali (born 28 May 1991) is a French former professional footballer who played as a goalkeeper.

== Club career ==
Ligali was promoted to the Montpellier first team before the beginning of the 2009–10 season. He was given the squad number 30. On 1 December 2012, Ligali made his professional debut in a league match against Lyon.

== International career ==
Ligali was born in France, and is of Beninese descent through his mother. After representing France at youth level, Ligali switched his international allegiance to Benin in October 2018.

== Career statistics ==
Appearances and goals by club, season and competition
| Club | Season | League | | | Cup | | League Cup | | Europe | | Other | | Total | |
| Club | Season | Division | Apps | Goals | Apps | Goals | Apps | Goals | Apps | Goals | Apps | Goals | Apps | Goals |
|---|---|---|---|---|---|---|---|---|---|---|---|---|---|---|
| Montpellier B | 2012–13 | CFA 2 | 11 | 0 | — | | — | | — | | — | | 11 | 0 |
| Montpellier B | 2013–14 | CFA 2 | 19 | 0 | — | | — | | — | | — | | 19 | 0 |
| Montpellier B | 2014–15 | CFA | 11 | 0 | — | | — | | — | | — | | 11 | 0 |
| Montpellier B | 2015–16 | CFA 2 | 9 | 0 | — | | — | | — | | — | | 9 | 0 |
| Montpellier B | 2016–17 | CFA | 12 | 0 | — | | — | | — | | — | | 12 | 0 |
| Montpellier B | 2018–19 | Championnat National 3 | 10 | 0 | — | | — | | — | | — | | 10 | 0 |
| Montpellier B | | | 72 | 0 | — | | — | | — | | — | | 72 | 0 |
| Montpellier | 2012–13 | Ligue 1 | 1 | 0 | 0 | 0 | 0 | 0 | 1 (Note: Appearance(s) in UEFA Champions League) | 0 | 0 | 0 | 2 | 0 |
| Montpellier | 2013–14 | Ligue 1 | 0 | 0 | 0 | 0 | 0 | 0 | — | | — | | 0 | 0 |
| Montpellier | 2014–15 | Ligue 1 | 6 | 0 | 0 | 0 | 1 | 0 | — | | — | | 7 | 0 |
| Montpellier | 2015–16 | Ligue 1 | 6 | 0 | 1 | 0 | 1 | 0 | — | | — | | 8 | 0 |
| Montpellier | 2016–17 | Ligue 1 | 0 | 0 | 0 | 0 | 1 | 0 | — | | — | | 1 | 0 |
| Montpellier | 2018–19 | Ligue 1 | 0 | 0 | 0 | 0 | 0 | 0 | — | | — | | 0 | 0 |
| Montpellier | Total | | 13 | 0 | 1 | 0 | 3 | 0 | 1 | 0 | 0 | 0 | 18 | 0 |
| Dunkerque (loan) | 2017–18 | Championnat National | 29 | 0 | 2 | 0 | — | | — | | — | | 31 | 0 |
| Career total | | | 114 | 0 | 3 | 0 | 3 | 0 | 1 | 0 | 0 | 0 | 121 | 0 |
