= Geoffrey Jourdren =

French footballer (born 1986)

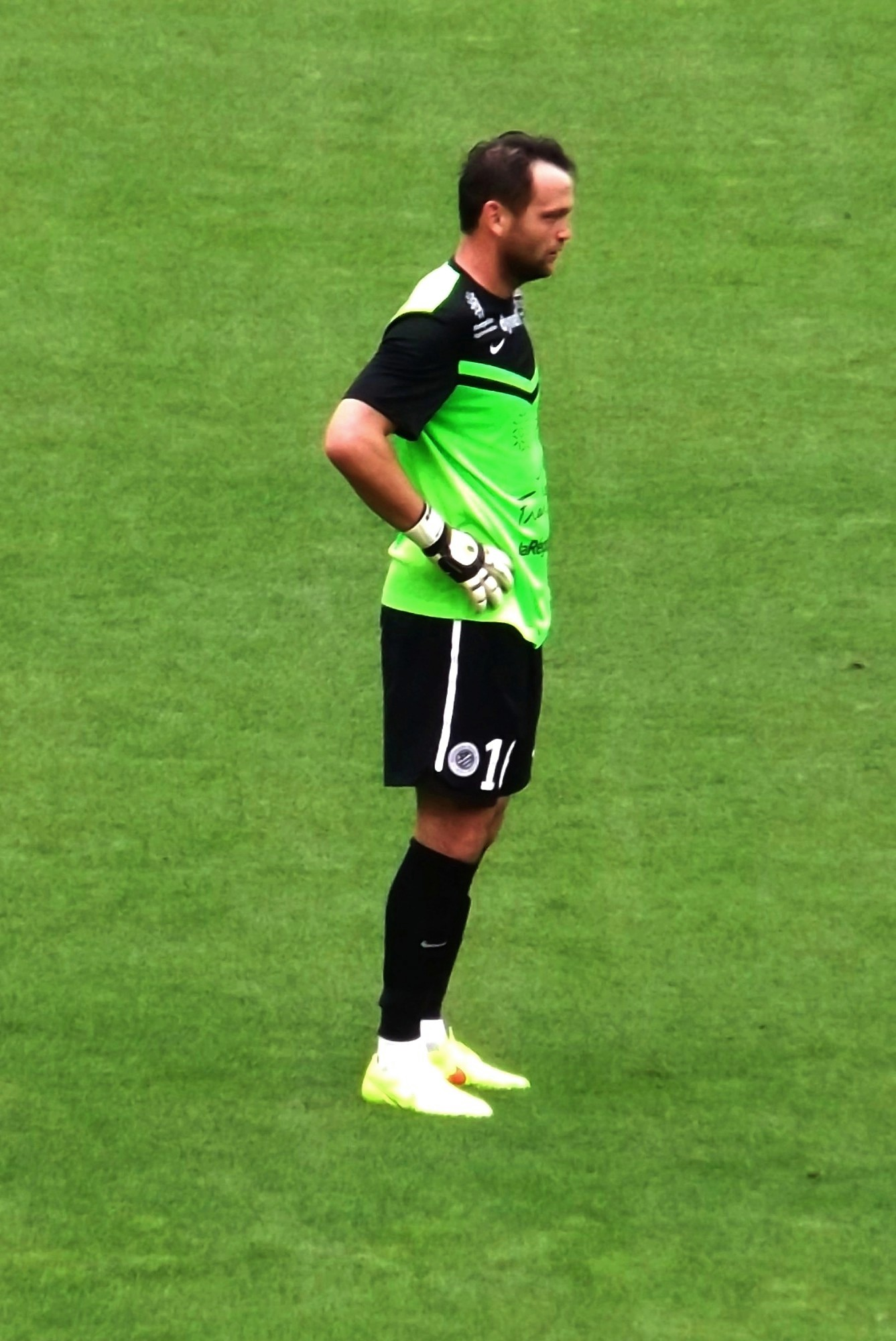
- Jourdren in 2014

Personal information
- Date of birth: 4 February 1986 (age 40)
- Place of birth: Paris, France
- Height: 1.81 m (5 ft 11 in)
- Position: Goalkeeper

Youth career
- 1996–2002: CS Meaux
- 1999–2002: INF Clairefontaine
- 2002–2006: Montpellier

Senior career*
Years	Team	Apps	(Gls)
2006–2017	Montpellier	270	(0)
2016	Montpellier II	1	(0)
2017–2018	Nancy	23	(0)
2018	Nancy II	1	(0)
Total		295	(0)

International career
2006	France U21	1	(0)
Medal record
Men's Football
Representing France
UEFA European Under-19 Championship
Winner	2005	Team
- * Club domestic league appearances and goals

Geoffrey Jourdren (born 4 February 1986) is a French professional footballer who played as a goalkeeper. A Montpellier youth product, he spent most his career with the club, remaining first choice for many years and making 270 league appearances. He made one appearance for the France U21 national team.

== Career ==
In July 2017, Jourdren joined Nancy on a two-year contract leaving Montpellier after 11 professional seasons at the club. Montpellier let him go on a free transfer with one year on his contract remaining. On 5 November 2018, Jourdren terminated his contract with Nancy.

He ended his playing career after being released by Nancy.

== Career statistics ==
=== Club ===
Appearances and goals by club, season and competition
Club	Season	League			Cup		League Cup		Europe		Other		Total	
Club	Season	Division	Apps	Goals	Apps	Goals	Apps	Goals	Apps	Goals	Apps	Goals	Apps	Goals
Montpellier	2005–06	Ligue 2	0	0	0	0	0	0	—		—		0	0
Montpellier	2006–07	Ligue 2	12	0	4	0	1	0	—		—		17	0
Montpellier	2007–08	Ligue 2	32	0	1	0	1	0	—		—		34	0
Montpellier	2008–09	Ligue 1	1	0	0	0	0	0	—		—		1	0
Montpellier	2009–10	Ligue 1	38	0	0	0	0	0	—		—		38	0
Montpellier	2010–11	Ligue 1	37	0	0	0	0	0	2 (Note: Appearance(s) in UEFA Europa League)	0	—		39	0
Montpellier	2011–12	Ligue 1	34	0	0	0	1	0	—		—		35	0
Montpellier	2012–13	Ligue 1	33	0	1	0	0	0	4 (Note: Appearance(s) in UEFA Champions League)	0	1 (Note: Appearance(s) in Trophée des Champions)	0	39	0
Montpellier	2013–14	Ligue 1	34	0	1	0	0	0	—		—		35	0
Montpellier	2014–15	Ligue 1	29	0	0	0	0	0	—		—		29	0
Montpellier	2015–16	Ligue 1	7	0	0	0	0	0	—		—		7	0
Montpellier	2016–17	Ligue 1	13	0	0	0	0	0	—		—		13	0
Montpellier	Total		270	0	8	0	3	0	6	0	1	0	288	0
Montpellier II	2015–16	CFA 2	1	0	—		—		—		—		1	0
Nancy	2017–18	Ligue 2	23	0	1	0	0	0	—		—		24	0
Nancy II	2017–18	Championnat National 3	1	0	—		—		—		—		1	0
Career total			295	0	9	0	3	0	6	0	1	0	314	0

== Honours ==
Montpellier

- Ligue 1: 2011–12
