= Morgan Sanson =

French association football player (born 1994)

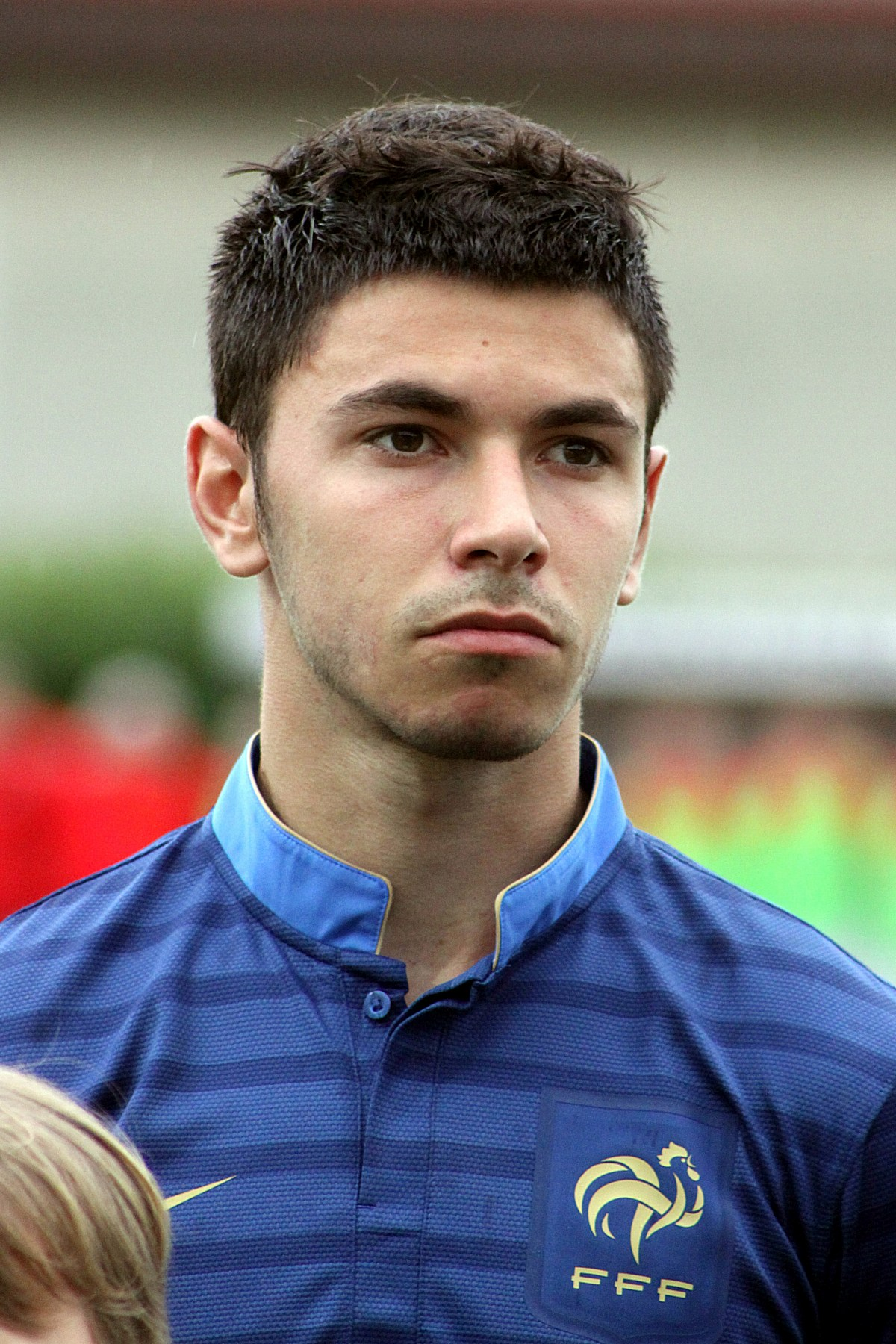
- Sanson with France U19 in 2013

Personal information
- Full name: Morgan Stéphane Sanson
- Date of birth: 18 August 1994 (age 32)
- Place of birth: Saint-Doulchard, France
- Height: 1.80 m (5 ft 11 in)
- Position: Midfielder

Team information
- Current team: Nice
- Number: 8

Youth career
- 2000–2005: Gazélec Bourges
- 2005–2009: Bourges
- 2009–2012: Le Mans

Senior career*
Years	Team	Apps	(Gls)
2012	Le Mans II	10	(7)
2012–2013	Le Mans	27	(3)
2013–2017	Montpellier	98	(13)
2017–2021	Marseille	122	(22)
2021–2024	Aston Villa	21	(0)
2023	→ Strasbourg (loan)	18	(1)
2023–2024	→ Nice (loan)	29	(2)
2024–	Nice	38	(3)

International career
2012–2013	France U19	7	(0)
2013–2016	France U21	11	(2)
- * Club domestic league appearances and goals as of 18 October 2026

Morgan Stéphane Sanson (born 18 August 1994) is a French professional footballer who plays as a midfielder for Ligue 1 club Nice.

== Early life ==
Sanson was born in Saint-Doulchard

== Club career ==
=== Le Mans ===
Ahead of the 2012–13 season, Sanson was promoted to the senior team by manager Denis Zanko and assigned the number 25 shirt. He made his professional debut on 3 August 2012 in a league match against Dijon, replacing Idrissa Sylla with only ten minutes to play. He scored his first league goal on 22 December 2012 against Monaco in a 2–3 home loss.

=== Montpellier ===
On 12 June 2013, Sanson signed a four-year contract with Montpellier for a reported fee of €700,000. He made his debut for the club on 14 September 2013, in a 0–0 draw against Stade de Reims.

=== Marseille ===
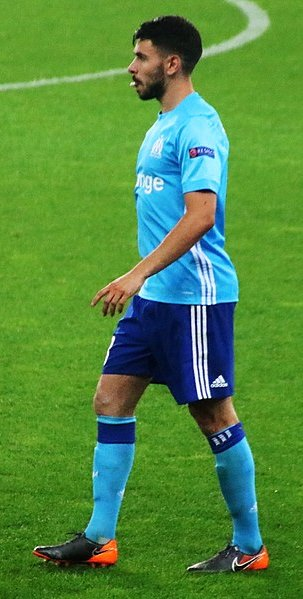
Sanson playing for Marseille in 2018

On 17 January 2017, Sanson joined south coast rivals Marseille by signing a four-and-a-half-year contract, for an initial fee estimated to be €9 million, plus €3 million in bonuses. On 5 March 2017, he scored a goal in the 56th minute in a 4–1 Ligue 1 away win against Lorient, his first Ligue 1 goal for Marseille.

On 3 May 2018, he played in the Europa League semi-finals away to FC Red Bull Salzburg as Marseille played out a 1–2 away loss but a 3–2 aggregate win to secure a place in the 2018 UEFA Europa League Final which was played at the Parc Olympique Lyonnais, and saw his team lose to Atlético Madrid.

=== Aston Villa ===
On 26 January 2021, Sanson signed for English Premier League side Aston Villa on a 4 1/2-year contract, for a fee believed to be £14 million, with £1.5 million in add-ons. On 3 February 2021, Sanson made his Aston Villa debut as a late substitute in a 3–1 defeat to West Ham at Villa Park. On 4 April 2021, Sanson suffered a knee injury midway through the second half in a 3–1 victory over Fulham which ended his season prematurely.

On 31 August 2021, Sanson made his return from injury as one of the permitted overage players for Aston Villa U21s, in a 3–1 victory over Wycombe Wanderers in the EFL Trophy. On 22 September 2021, Sanson returned to the first team in an EFL Cup tie against Chelsea – but he was forced to leave the field before half time after a recurrence of his injury. The arrival of Steven Gerrard as Aston Villa manager coincided with Sanson regaining fitness and he started in the Premier League for the first time in 8 months on 26 December 2021. Gerrard described how Sanson had been disappointed with the start to his English football career, but he had assured him that he was aware of his talent, despite Sanson's fleeting appearances up until that point.

In newly appointed manager Unai Emery's first match for Villa, on 6 November 2022, Sanson made his first appearance of the 2022–23 campaign, coming on as a substitute in the 90th minute as Villa defeated Manchester United 3–1. On 8 January 2023, Sanson scored his first goal for Aston Villa in a 2–1 defeat to lower league Stevenage in the FA Cup.

==== Strasbourg loan ====
On 23 January 2023, Sanson joined Strasbourg on loan until the end of the current season.

=== Nice ===
On 24 July 2023, Sanson joined OGC Nice on a season-long loan. On 15 May 2024, it was announced that Nice had made the loan transfer a permanent one.

== International career ==
Sanson is a France youth international having represented his nation at under-19 and under-21 level yum.

== Career statistics ==
As of match played 18 October 2026

Appearances and goals by club, season and competition
Club	Season	League			National cup (Note: Includes Coupe de France, FA Cup)		League cup (Note: Includes Coupe de la Ligue, EFL Cup)		Europe		Other		Total	
Club	Season	Division	Apps	Goals	Apps	Goals	Apps	Goals	Apps	Goals	Apps	Goals	Apps	Goals
Le Mans	2012–13	Ligue 2	27	3	1	0	1	0	—		—		29	3
Montpellier	2013–14	Ligue 1	32	1	3	0	1	0	—		—		36	1
Montpellier	2014–15	Ligue 1	32	6	1	0	1	0	—		—		34	6
Montpellier	2015–16	Ligue 1	14	3	1	0	0	0	—		—		15	3
Montpellier	2016–17	Ligue 1	20	3	0	0	1	0	—		—		21	3
Montpellier	Total		98	13	5	0	3	0	—		—		106	13
Marseille	2016–17	Ligue 1	17	1	1	0	—		—		—		18	1
Marseille	2017–18	Ligue 1	33	9	2	1	1	0	17 (Note: Appearances in UEFA Europa League)	2	—		53	12
Marseille	2018–19	Ligue 1	33	5	1	0	1	0	2	0	—		37	5
Marseille	2019–20	Ligue 1	27	5	2	0	1	0	—		—		30	5
Marseille	2020–21	Ligue 1	12	2	—		—		6 (Note: Appearances in UEFA Champions League)	0	1 (Note: Appearance in Trophée des Champions)	0	19	2
Marseille	Total		122	22	6	1	3	0	25	2	1	0	157	25
Aston Villa	2020–21	Premier League	9	0	0	0	0	0	—		—		9	0
Aston Villa	2021–22	Premier League	10	0	0	0	1	0	—		—		11	0
Aston Villa	2022–23	Premier League	2	0	1	1	0	0	—		—		3	1
Aston Villa	2023–24	Premier League	0	0	0	0	0	0	0	0	—		0	0
Aston Villa	Total		21	0	1	1	1	0	—		—		23	1
Strasbourg (loan)	2022–23	Ligue 1	18	1	—		—		—		—		18	1
Nice (loan)	2023–24	Ligue 1	29	2	2	2	—		—		—		31	4
Nice	2024–25	Ligue 1	6	3	0	0	—		0	0	—		6	3
Nice	2025–26	Ligue 1	31	0	6	1	—		7 (Note: One appearance in UEFA Champions League, six appearances in UEFA Europa League)	0	2 (Note: Appearances in Ligue 1 relegation/promotion play-offs)	0	46	1
Nice	2026–27	Ligue 1	1	0	0	0	—		—		—		1	0
Nice	Total		38	3	6	1	—		7	0	2	0	53	4
Career total			354	44	21	5	8	0	32	2	3	0	417	51

== Honours ==
Marseille

- UEFA Europa League runner-up: 2017–18

Nice

- Coupe de France runner-up: 2025–26
