= Mamadou N'Diaye (footballer, born 1995) =

Senegalese footballer

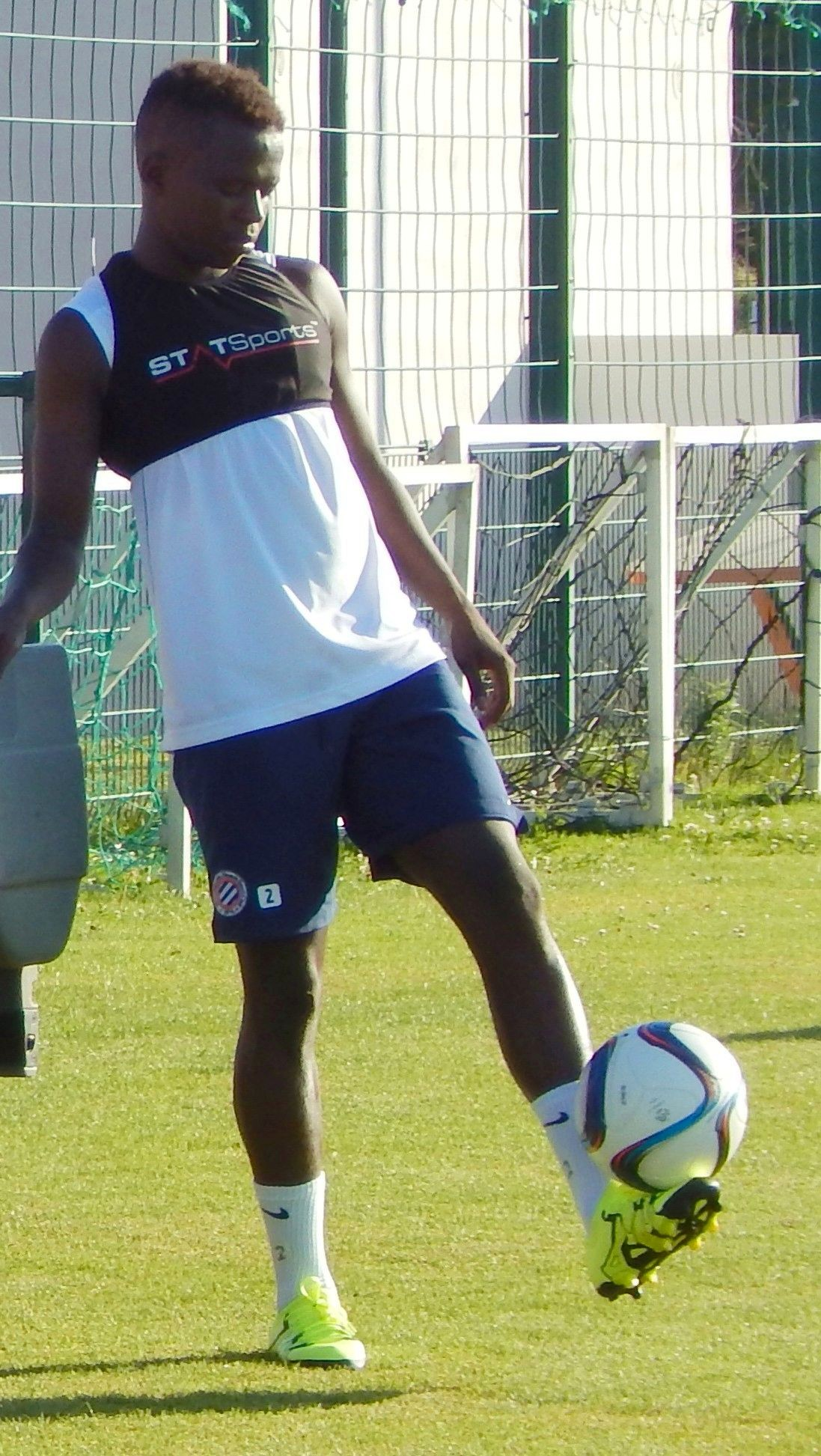
- N'Diaye with Montpellier

Personal information
- Date of birth: 28 May 1995 (age 31)
- Place of birth: Thiès, Senegal
- Height: 1.74 m (5 ft 9 in)
- Position: Left-back

Team information
- Current team: Marignane GCB
- Number: 24

Senior career*
Years	Team	Apps	(Gls)
2013–2017	Montpellier B	41	(5)
2015–2017	Montpellier	12	(0)
2017–2019	Avranches	37	(2)
2017–2019	Avranches B	7	(3)
2019–2020	Villefranche	17	(0)
2020–2023	Le Puy	59	(5)
2023–2024	Othellos Athienou	12	(1)
2024–	Marignane GCB	10	(0)

International career
2014	Senegal	1	(0)
- * Club domestic league appearances and goals as of 23 November 2024

Mamadou N'Diaye (born 28 May 1995) is a Senegalese professional footballer who plays as a left-back for French Championnat National 1 club Marignane GCB. In 2014, he made one appearance for the Senegal national team.

== Honours ==
Le Puy

- Championnat National 2: 2021–22
