= Paul Lasne =

French footballer (born 1989)

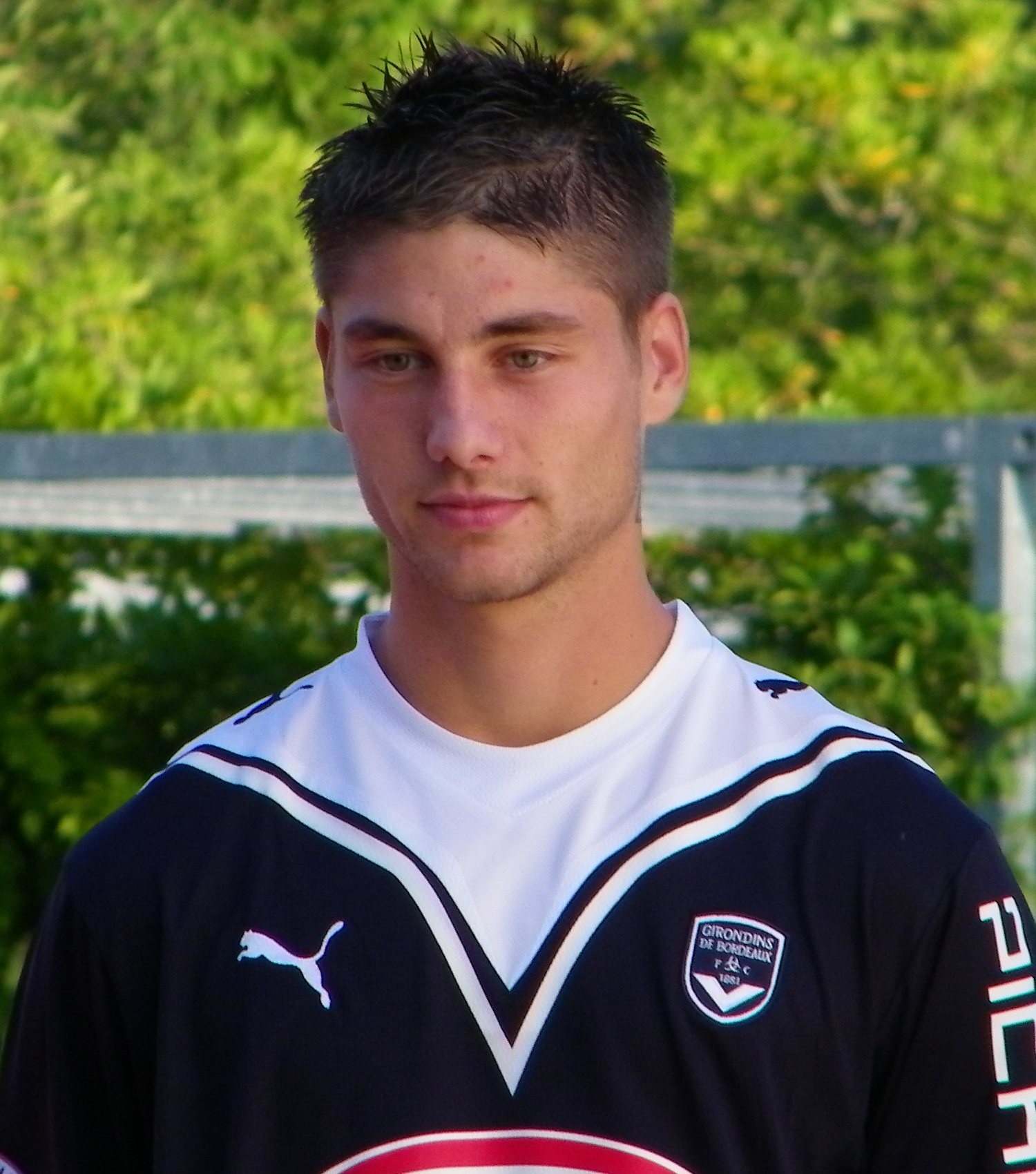
- Lasne in Bordeaux colours

Personal information
- Full name: Paul Bastien Lasne
- Date of birth: 16 January 1989 (age 37)
- Place of birth: Saint-Cloud, France
- Height: 1.86 m (6 ft 1 in)
- Position: Midfielder

Team information
- Current team: Paris FC
- Number: 6

Youth career
- –2010: Bordeaux

Senior career*
| Years | Team | Apps | (Gls) |
| 2010–2011 | Bordeaux | 0 | (0) |
| 2010 | → Châteauroux (loan) | 9 | (0) |
| 2010–2011 | → Ajaccio (loan) | 32 | (1) |
| 2011–2014 | Ajaccio | 89 | (4) |
| 2012 | Ajaccio B | 1 | (0) |
| 2014–2019 | Montpellier | 136 | (8) |
| 2016 | Montpellier B | 4 | (0) |
| 2019–2022 | Brest | 56 | (2) |
| 2022– | Paris FC | 34 | (0) |
- * Club domestic league appearances and goals as of 03:29, 4 June 2024 (UTC)

Paul Bastien Lasne (born 16 January 1989) is a French professional footballer who plays as a midfielder for Ligue 1 club Paris FC.

== Career ==
Born in Saint-Cloud, Lasne broke into the first team squad at Bordeaux in 2009. He was loaned out to Châteauroux in January 2010. He left them at the end of the season having played nine games in total. At the start of the 2010–11 season he was loaned out again, to AC Ajaccio. He made his debut for Ajaccio on 13 September in a 1–1 draw with Évian Thonon Gaillard.

On 27 June 2011, he signed a permanent deal lasting until June 2014 at Ajaccio.

After his contract with Ajaccio expired in June 2014, Lasne joined Montpellier HSC with a four-year contract.

On 27 June 2022, Lasne signed a two-year deal with Paris FC.

== Career statistics ==
As of match played 10 May 2024

Appearances and goals by club, season and competition
| Club | Season | League | | | National cup | | League cup | | Other | | Total | |
| Club | Season | Division | Apps | Goals | Apps | Goals | Apps | Goals | Apps | Goals | Apps | Goals |
|---|---|---|---|---|---|---|---|---|---|---|---|---|
| Bordeaux | 2009–10 | Ligue 1 | 0 | 0 | 0 | 0 | 0 | 0 | 0 | 0 | 0 | 0 |
| Châteauroux (loan) | 2009–10 | Ligue 2 | 9 | 0 | 0 | 0 | 0 | 0 | — | | 9 | 0 |
| Ajaccio (loan) | 2010–11 | Ligue 2 | 32 | 1 | 1 | 0 | 2 | 0 | — | | 35 | 1 |
| Ajaccio | 2011–12 | Ligue 1 | 27 | 0 | 2 | 0 | 1 | 0 | — | | 30 | 0 |
| Ajaccio | 2012–13 | Ligue 1 | 28 | 1 | 1 | 0 | 0 | 0 | — | | 29 | 1 |
| Ajaccio | 2013–14 | Ligue 1 | 34 | 3 | 2 | 0 | 1 | 0 | — | | 37 | 3 |
| Ajaccio | Total | | 89 | 4 | 5 | 0 | 2 | 0 | — | | 96 | 4 |
| Ajaccio B | 2012–13 | CFA 2 | 1 | 0 | — | | — | | — | | 1 | 0 |
| Montpellier | 2014–15 | Ligue 1 | 31 | 2 | 1 | 0 | 1 | 0 | — | | 33 | 2 |
| Montpellier | 2015–16 | Ligue 1 | 9 | 0 | 0 | 0 | 0 | 0 | — | | 9 | 0 |
| Montpellier | 2016–17 | Ligue 1 | 24 | 3 | 1 | 0 | 2 | 0 | — | | 27 | 3 |
| Montpellier | 2017–18 | Ligue 1 | 37 | 1 | 3 | 0 | 2 | 0 | — | | 42 | 1 |
| Montpellier | 2018–19 | Ligue 1 | 35 | 2 | 1 | 0 | 1 | 0 | — | | 37 | 2 |
| Montpellier | Total | | 136 | 8 | 6 | 0 | 6 | 0 | — | | 148 | 8 |
| Montpellier B | 2016–17 | CFA | 4 | 0 | — | | — | | — | | 4 | 0 |
| Brest | 2019–20 | Ligue 1 | 19 | 2 | 1 | 0 | 0 | 0 | — | | 20 | 2 |
| Brest | 2020–21 | Ligue 1 | 22 | 0 | 0 | 0 | — | | — | | 22 | 0 |
| Brest | 2021–22 | Ligue 1 | 15 | 0 | 2 | 0 | — | | — | | 17 | 0 |
| Brest | Total | | 56 | 2 | 3 | 0 | 0 | 0 | — | | 59 | 2 |
| Paris FC | 2022–23 | Ligue 2 | 28 | 0 | 4 | 0 | — | | — | | 32 | 0 |
| Paris FC | 2023–24 | Ligue 2 | 6 | 0 | 0 | 0 | — | | 0 | 0 | 6 | 0 |
| Paris FC | Total | | 34 | 0 | 4 | 0 | — | | 0 | 0 | 38 | 0 |
| Career total | | | 361 | 15 | 19 | 0 | 10 | 0 | 0 | 0 | 390 | 15 |

== Honours ==
Bordeaux

- Trophée des Champions: 2009
