= William Rémy =

French footballer (born 1991)

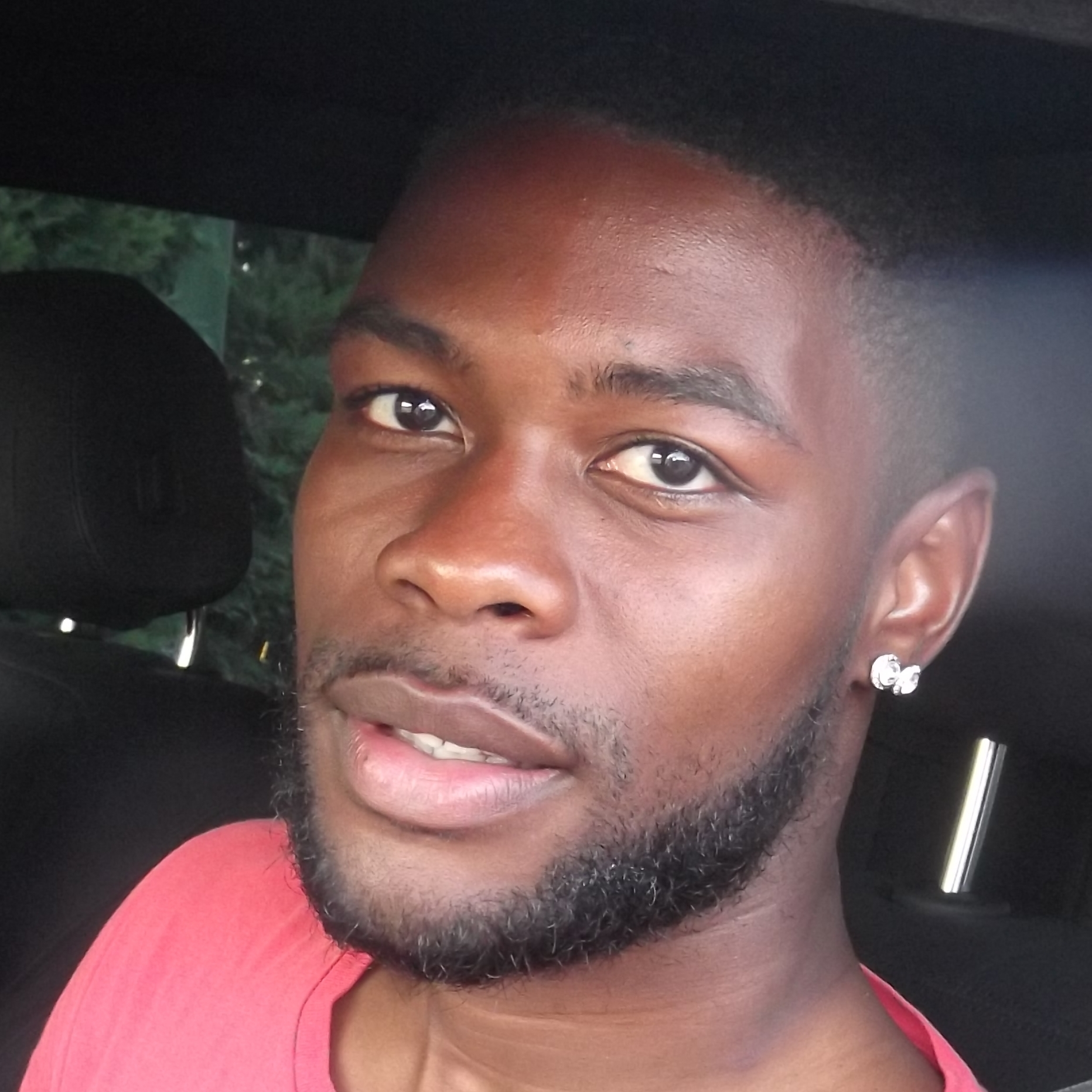
- Rémy in 2015

Personal information
- Date of birth: 4 April 1991 (age 35)
- Place of birth: Courbevoie, France
- Height: 1.84 m (6 ft 0 in)
- Position: Centre-back

Youth career
- 2001–2003: Saint Michel Sports
- 2003–2004: Linas-Montlhéry
- 2004–2008: Lens

Senior career*
Years	Team	Apps	(Gls)
2008–2012	Lens	17	(1)
2010–2011	→ Créteil (loan)	21	(1)
2011	→ Créteil B (loan)	2	(0)
2011–2012	Lens B	66	(2)
2012–2015	Dijon	57	(5)
2012–2014	Dijon B	6	(1)
2015–2018	Montpellier	43	(0)
2015–2017	Montpellier B	14	(1)
2018–2020	Legia Warsaw	40	(3)
2019–2019	Legia Warsaw II	3	(0)
2022–2023	Virton	26	(0)
2024	Zagłębie Sosnowiec	13	(0)

International career
2007–2008	France U17		
2008–2009	France U18		
2010	France U19	1	(0)
Medal record
Men's football
Representing France
UEFA European Under-17 Championship
Runner-up	2008 Turkey
- * Club domestic league appearances and goals as of 28 May 2024

William Rémy (born 4 April 1991) is a French professional footballer who plays as a centre-back. He is a former French youth international, having starred for the under-17, under-18, and under-19 teams.

== Club career ==
Born in Courbevoie, Rémy joined Pas-de-Calais-based club Lens in 2004. He made his professional football debut on 13 October 2008 in a Ligue 2 match against Guingamp coming on as a substitute playing 8 minutes. Rémy also appeared in his club's upset loss to Championnat de France amateur 2 side and lesser rivals Arras Football in the Coupe de France coming on as a substitute in the 81st minute and playing the entire extra time session before watching his club bow out 4–2 on penalties.

In August 2011 Rémy had a trial at Newcastle United along with Darnel Situ. Both Remy and Situ scored in their debut for the reserves in a 5–0 victory over Gateshead.

After four years with Lens, Rémy moved to the Ligue 2 side Dijon FCO on a three-year contract.

In January 2018, he joined Polish club Legia Warsaw from Montpellier HSC on a 3 1/2-year deal. On 18 December 2020, his contract with Legia was terminated.

On 25 December 2021, Rémy agreed to join Virton in Belgium.

On 7 February 2024, he returned to Poland to sign with I liga side Zagłębie Sosnowiec until the end of the season, with an option for another year. After Zagłębie's last-place finish and relegation, Rémy left the club at the end of June 2024.

== International career ==
Rémy was a France youth international. He was a part of the France U-17 squad that finished runners-up at the 2008 UEFA European Under-17 Championship. In a group stage match against Spain, he scored on a volley off a corner kick. The goal gave France a 3–2 lead, though Spain would later score and the match would end in a draw.

== Honours ==
Legia Warsaw

- Ekstraklasa: 2017–18, 2019–20, 2020–21
- Polish Cup: 2017–18
