= Kévin Bérigaud =

French footballer (born 1988)

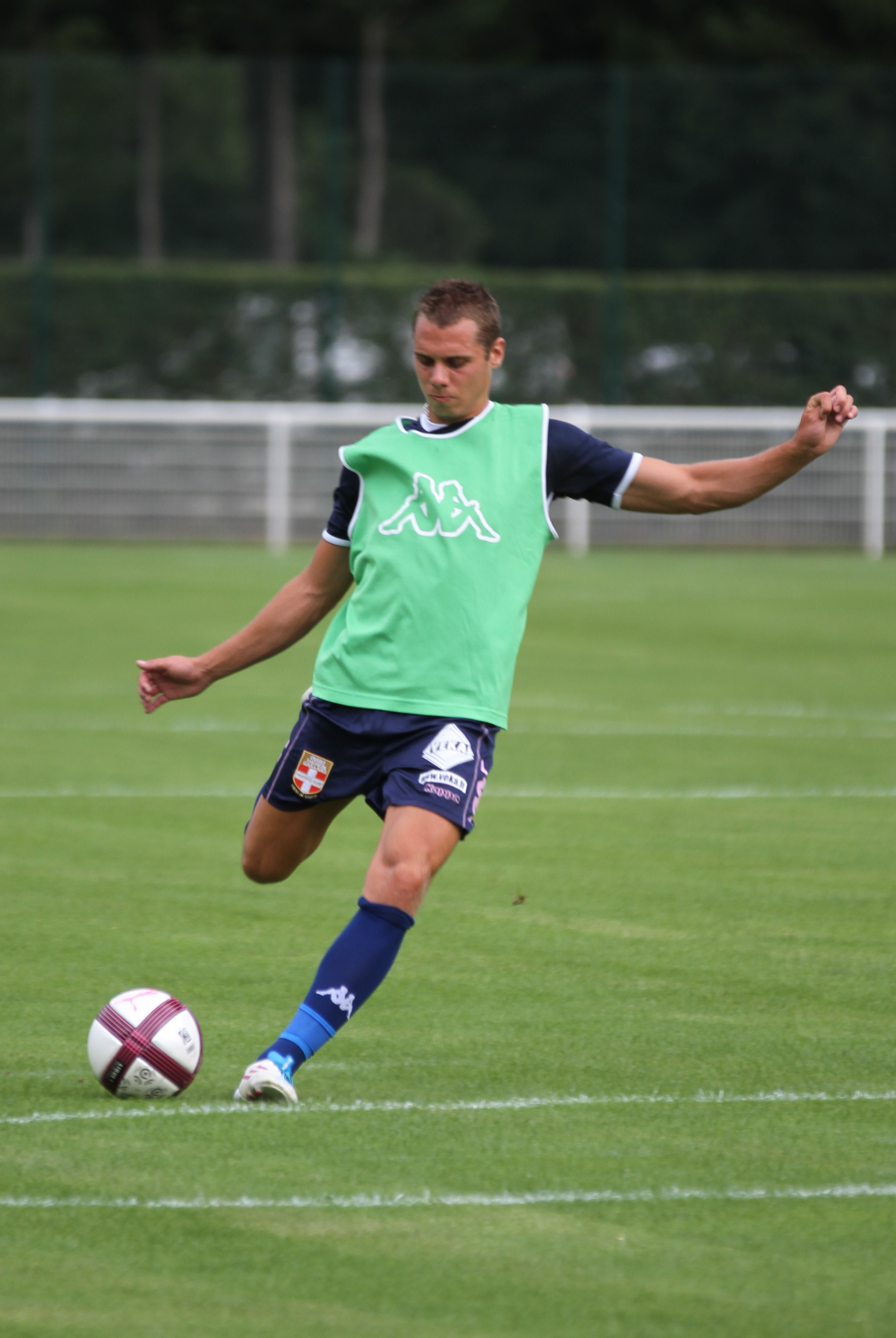
- Bérigaud training with Evian in 2011

Personal information
- Date of birth: 9 May 1988 (age 38)
- Place of birth: Thonon-les-Bains, France
- Height: 1.76 m (5 ft 9 in)
- Position: Striker

Youth career
- 1996–2003: ES Douvaine
- 2003–2005: Servette
- 2005–2007: Croix-de-Savoie (Note: In 2007, Football Croix-de-Savoie 74 merged with Olympique Thonon Chablais to create Olympique Croix de Savoie 74. In 2009, the club was renamed to Evian Thonon Gaillard FC.)

Senior career*
| Years | Team | Apps | (Gls) |
| 2007–2014 | Evian | 182 | (52) |
| 2012 | Evian B | 3 | (2) |
| 2014–2017 | Montpellier | 70 | (7) |
| 2015–2017 | Montpellier B | 8 | (4) |
| 2017 | → Angers (loan) | 13 | (0) |
| 2018–2022 | Pafos | 68 | (22) |
| 2019 | → Riga (loan) | 0 | (0) |
| Total | | 344 | (87) |
- * Club domestic league appearances and goals

Kévin Bérigaud (born 9 May 1988) is a French former professional footballer who played as a striker.

== Career ==
Born in Thonon-les-Bains, Bérigaud began his career playing in the academy of Swiss club Servette. He joined Football Croix-de-Savoie in 2005. In 2007, the year Bérigaud joined the first team, the club merged with Olympique Thonon Chablais to create Olympique Croix de Savoie. The club adopted the name of Evian Thonon Gaillard, or Evian for short, in 2009.

In January 2019, Bérigaud joined Latvian club Riga on loan.
