= Daniel Congré =

French footballer (born 1985)

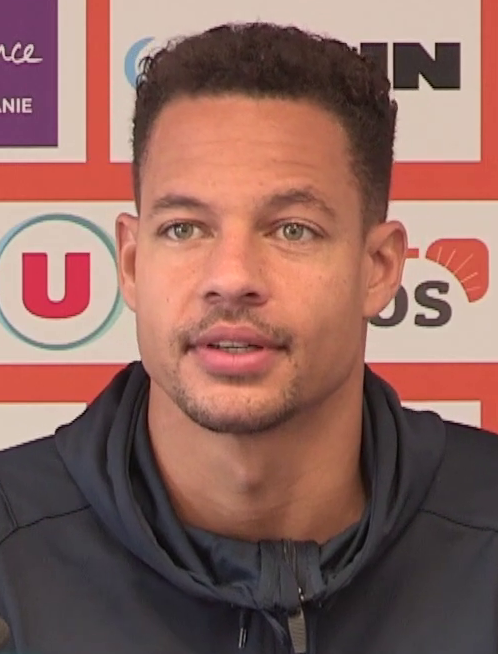
- Congré in 2021

Personal information
- Date of birth: 5 April 1985 (age 41)
- Place of birth: Toulouse, France
- Height: 1.84 m (6 ft 0 in)
- Position: Defender

Youth career
- 1996–2004: Toulouse

Senior career*
Years	Team	Apps	(Gls)
2004–2012	Toulouse	201	(4)
2012–2021	Montpellier	289	(10)
2021–2024	Dijon	72	(2)
Total		562	(16)

International career
2004–2007	France U21	7	(2)
- * Club domestic league appearances and goals

Daniel Congré (born 5 April 1985) is a French former professional footballer who played as a defender. He could operate all across defence, although he was most adept at centre-back. He is noted for his pace.

== Club career ==
Born in Toulouse, France to Martiniquais parents. Congré arrived at his hometown club Toulouse in the summer of 1996 at the age of 11, joining as a youth player. He quickly ascended through the ranks and eventually made his professional debut during the 2004–05 season in a league match against Rennes coming on as a halftime substitute. He remained on the senior squad that season making 23 total appearances. The following two seasons, his play was heavily limited, mainly due to fracturing his left foot in a match against RC Lens on 20 March 2006. The injury forced him to miss not only the rest of the 2005–06 season, but also the beginning of the 2006–07 season, that Toulouse qualified for the UEFA Champions League.

Congré endured more injuries during the 2007–08 season. A shoulder injury forced him to miss Toulouse's Champions League third round qualifying matches with Liverpool, where Toulouse were eliminated 0–5 on aggregate. He returned for Ligue 1 play, but picked up another injury missing out the remaining season. He appeared in only 42 league matches over those three years. He returned to form for the 2008–09 season appearing in 29 league matches and scoring one goal against Le Havre contributing to Toulouse's 5th-place finish. He also scored a goal in Toulouse's 8–0 defeat of local side FCE Schirrhein in the Coupe de France. He recently signed a contract extension with the club through 2014, but on 21 June 2012 he agreed to a transfer to Montpellier HSC.

On 5 July 2021, Congré joined Ligue 2 club Dijon on a two-year deal.

== International career ==
Congré has played on various youth football teams of France. He was a member of the France U-21 team collecting 7 caps and scoring two goals. Due to fracturing his foot, he missed the 2006 UEFA European Under-21 Football Championship. He has yet to be capped by the senior national side. Of Guadeloupean descent, he was named to the Guadeloupe national team's preliminary squad for the 2009 CONCACAF Gold Cup, but did not make the final squad. His call-up and participation would have not bar future selections from France for Congré, as Guadeloupe (a French overseas department) is not a member of FIFA.

== Personal life ==
On 9 June 2025, Congré was found seriously injured at his home in Pérols. When contacted, the Montpellier public prosecutor's office said it was “a suicide attempt”. It was revealed that the 40-year-old former player had been found unconscious and losing a lot of blood, due to a knife wound around his heart.
