= Mathieu Deplagne =

French footballer (born 1991)

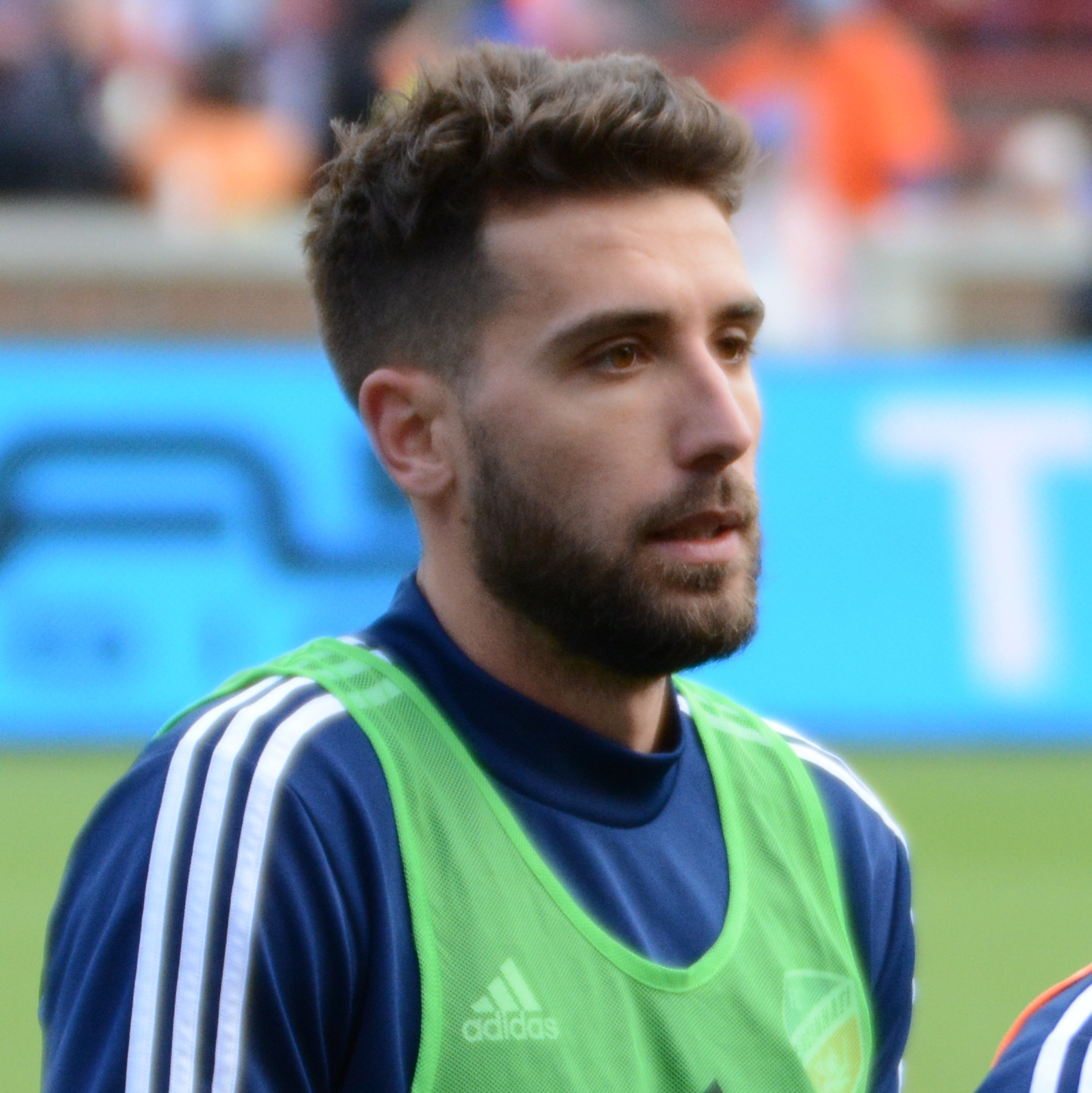
- Deplagne with FC Cincinnati in 2019

Personal information
- Date of birth: 1 October 1991 (age 35)
- Place of birth: Pau, France
- Height: 1.83 m (6 ft 0 in)
- Position: Right-back

Youth career
- 1996–2000: FC Sussargues
- 2000–2012: Montpellier

Senior career*
Years	Team	Apps	(Gls)
2010–2017	Montpellier	113	(1)
2007–2017	Montpellier B	64	(8)
2017–2019	Troyes	35	(0)
2019–2020	FC Cincinnati	48	(1)
2021	San Antonio FC	18	(1)
- * Club domestic league appearances and goals as of 7 November 2021

Mathieu Deplagne (born 1 October 1991) is a French professional footballer who plays as a right-back.

== Career ==
Deplagne started his career with Montpellier, with whom he won the Ligue 1 championship in the 2011–12 season.

In June 2017 Deplagne left Montpellier to sign a three-year contract with Ligue 1 rivals Troyes.

On 19 December 2018, MLS side FC Cincinnati announced they had signed Deplagne ahead of their 2019 season. He scored his first Major League Soccer goal on 17 March in the 63rd minute of FCC's home opener against Portland Timbers. He was released by Cincinnati at the end of their 2020 season.

On 8 April 2021, Deplagne joined San Antonio FC in the USL Championship.

== Honours ==
Montpellier

- Ligue 1: 2011–12
- Coupe Gambardella (youth): 2009
