= Joris Marveaux =

French footballer (born 1982)

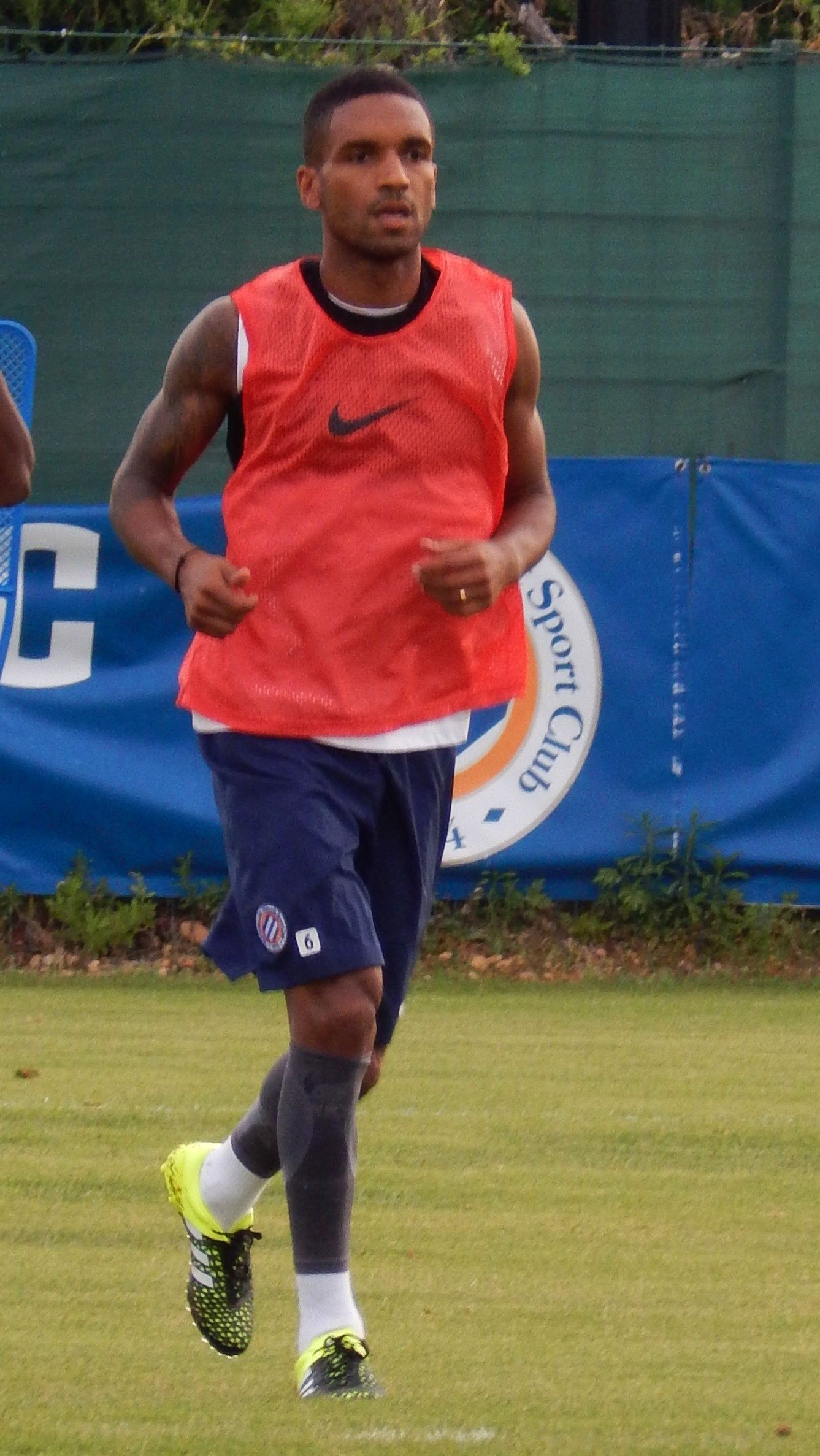

Personal information
- Full name: Joris Steve Marveaux
- Date of birth: 15 August 1982 (age 44)
- Place of birth: Vannes, France
- Height: 1.78 m (5 ft 10 in)
- Position: Midfielder

Youth career
- 1997–2001: Nantes
- 2001–2003: Lorient

Senior career*
Years	Team	Apps	(Gls)
2003–2006	Lorient	35	(1)
2006–2008	Clermont Foot	66	(1)
2008–2017	Montpellier	197	(11)
2017–2019	Gazélec Ajaccio	37	(3)
Total		335	(16)

International career
2019	Martinique	3	(1)

Managerial career
- 2019–2020: Montpellier (women's reserves)
- * Club domestic league appearances and goals

Joris Steve Marveaux (born 15 August 1982) is a French retired footballer who played as a midfielder.

== Club career ==
Marveaux made his professional debut for Lorient on 28 March 2003. Marveaux was a key part of Montpellier's league winning side in 2012.

== International ==
He made his Martinique national football team debut on 15 June 2019 in the 2019 CONCACAF Gold Cup game against Canada, as a starter.

=== International goals ===
Scores and results list Martinique's goal tally first.

No.	Date	Venue	Opponent	Score	Result	Competition
1.	19 June 2019	Broncos Stadium at Mile High, Denver, United States	Cuba	1–0	3–0	2019 CONCACAF Gold Cup

== Coaching career ==
After retiring in the summer 2019, Marveaux was hired as head coach of Montpellier's women's reserve team. He left the position at the end of May 2020.

== Personal life ==
Marveaux was born in France to a Martiniquais father and a French mother. His younger brother, Sylvain Marveaux, is also a professional footballer.

== Honours ==
Montpellier

- Ligue 1 (1): 2011–12
