= Seydou Keita =

Malian footballer (born 1980)

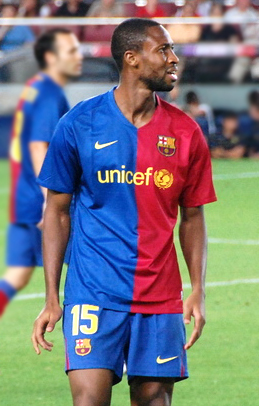
- Keita with Barcelona in 2008

Personal information
- Full name: Seydou Keita
- Date of birth: 16 January 1980 (age 46)
- Place of birth: Bamako, Mali
- Height: 1.83 m (6 ft 0 in)
- Position: Midfielder

Youth career
- 1995–1997: Centre Salif Keita
- 1997–1999: Marseille

Senior career*
Years	Team	Apps	(Gls)
1999–2000	Marseille	6	(0)
2000–2002	Lorient	58	(1)
2002–2007	Lens	157	(19)
2007–2008	Sevilla	31	(4)
2008–2012	Barcelona	119	(16)
2012–2014	Dalian Aerbin	37	(10)
2014	Valencia	11	(1)
2014–2016	Roma	46	(3)
2016–2017	El Jaish	16	(6)
Total		481	(60)

International career
1999	Mali U20		
2000–2015	Mali	102	(25)
Medal record
Men's football
Representing Mali
Africa Cup of Nations
Third place	2012
Third place	2013
- * Club domestic league appearances and goals

Seydou Keïta (French pronunciation: [sɛdu kɛjta]; anglicised to Keita; born 16 January 1980) is a Malian former professional footballer. A versatile midfielder, he operated as both a central or defensive midfielder. He is both the record appearance holder and scorer of the Mali national football team.

Keita most notably played for Lens (five seasons) and Barcelona (four), winning 14 titles with the latter club after signing in 2008. He started his youth career in Mali and his professional career with Marseille. His career would take him to clubs in France, Spain, China, Italy and Qatar.

Keita represented Mali since the age of 18, appearing in seven Africa Cup of Nations tournaments and winning 102 caps, scoring 25 times. In addition to his Malian nationality, he also has French nationality.

== Club career ==
=== Marseille ===
Born in Bamako, Mali, Keita finished his football formation in France with Olympique de Marseille, joining the club at the age of 17. He played mainly for the reserve squad during his three-year spell.

Keita made his Ligue 1 debut for L'OM on 19 September 1999 in a 1–0 home win against Troyes AC, adding three games in the season's UEFA Champions League. In the summer of 2000, he left the Stade Vélodrome.

=== Lorient and Lens ===
Keita signed for Lorient in Ligue 2, being instrumental (37 games, one goal) as the team promoted to the top level in 2001. He appeared slightly less due to injury in the following season, which ended in immediate relegation, but brought the conquest of the Coupe de France, the club's first-ever; he played the full 90 minutes in the final against SC Bastia.

In 2002, Keita joined fellow league side Lens, eventually becoming captain and scoring a career-best 13 goals in the 2006–07 season – his fifth and last – helping Les Sang et Or to fifth position in the league and the last-16 in the UEFA Cup.

=== Sevilla ===
On 11 July 2007, Keita signed a four-year contract with Sevilla for a €4 million transfer fee, plus a 10–15% capital gain for the club if it sold the player above €4 million. He appeared in both legs of that year's Supercopa de España, a 6–3 aggregate win against Real Madrid.

Keita was an automatic first-choice for the Andalusians during 2007–08, helping the team to the fifth position in the league. On 3 November 2007 he scored from long-distance in a 2–0 home win also over Real Madrid, and added three in nine matches in the Champions League, including one against Arsenal in a 3–1 group stage home victory which was the opposition's first loss of the campaign.

=== Barcelona ===
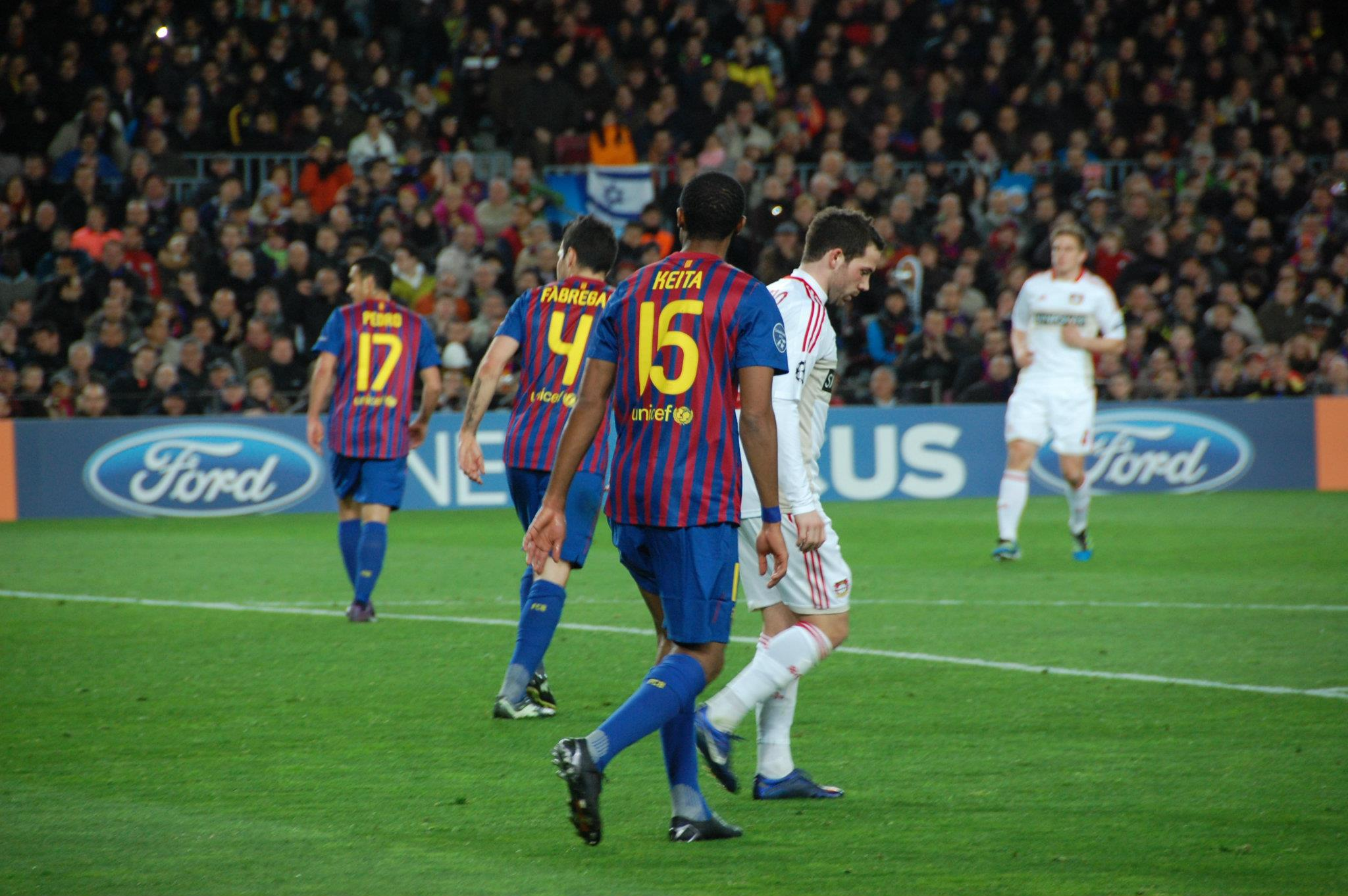
Keita (middle) in action against Bayer Leverkusen.

On 26 May 2008, Keita agreed to a four-year deal with Barcelona who paid his €14 million buy-out clause (making Lens eligible to receive €1.3 million from Sevilla). He became the first Malian player to ever represent the Catalans, and his new release clause was set at €90 million.

Keita made his official debut for Barcelona in a Champions League qualifier against Poland's Wisła Kraków on 13 August 2008, a 4–0 home win. He made his league debut against CD Numancia on the 31st, coming on as a substitute for Andrés Iniesta midway through the second half of a 0–1 away loss.

Keita scored his first goal for the team on 16 November 2008, in a 2–0 win at Recreativo de Huelva. The following week he added another, in a 1–1 home draw to Getafe; he finished his first season at the Camp Nou with 46 official appearances as Barça won the treble, and played 20 minutes in the Champions League final, taking the place of Thierry Henry in the 2–0 triumph against Manchester United.

On 25 October 2009, Keita scored his first career hat-trick, in a 6–1 home win against Real Zaragoza, and contributed with 29 games – 23 starts – as Barcelona renewed its domestic supremacy. In the 2010–11 campaign he made more appearances than any other outfield player and, on 31 August, aged 31, signed a contract extension that would link him to the club until 2014.

=== Dalian Aerbin ===
On 7 July 2012, Keita announced he would be leaving Barcelona after four seasons, invoking a clause in his contract allowing him to leave the club even though he still had two years left. The following day, he signed a two-and-a-half-year deal with Chinese Super League side Dalian Aerbin, being reportedly paid €14 million per year.

=== Valencia ===
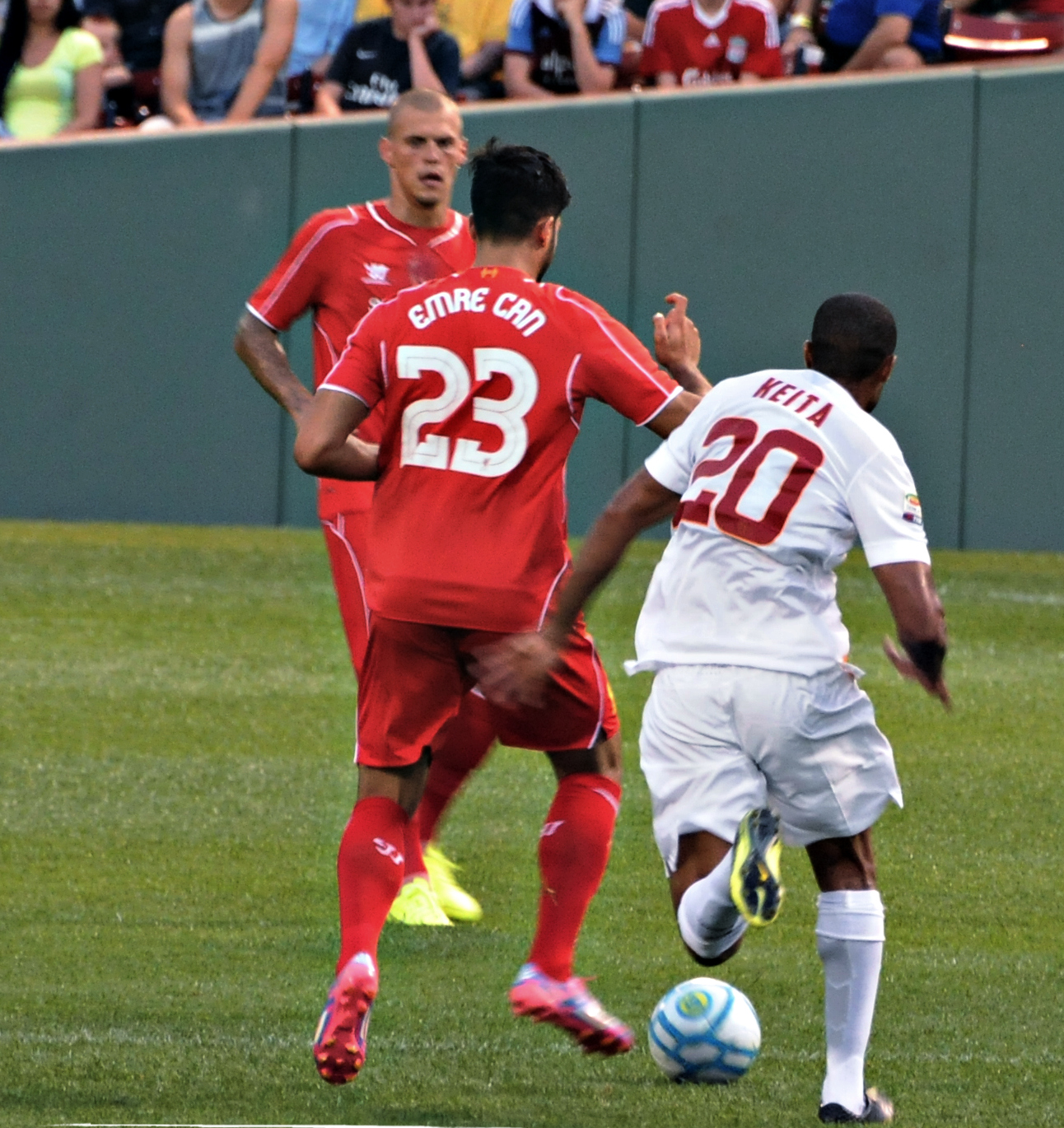
Keita playing for Roma in 2014.

On 30 January 2014, Keita returned to Spain after signing with Valencia, with the 34-year-old agreeing to a six-month contract with the option for an additional year. He made his debut for the Che on 16 February, replacing Paco Alcácer for the last 20 minutes of a 0–0 away draw against former club Sevilla. On 13 March, midway through the first half of an away fixture against PFC Ludogorets Razgrad for the UEFA Europa League, he was sent off for a challenge on Roman Bezjak that resulted in a penalty kick, but his team eventually won it 3–0 and 4–0 on aggregate.

Keita scored Valencia's fastest-ever goal on 27 March 2014, netting after nine seconds at Almería. He also had to leave before the end of the first half with an injury, as the hosts came from behind for a 2–2 draw.

=== Roma ===
On 5 June 2014, Keita signed a one-year contract with Serie A club Roma. He made his competitive debut in the opening day of the season, against ACF Fiorentina (2–0 win), and scored his first goal on 9 November to help defeat Torino F.C. 3–0 also at the Stadio Olimpico.

Keita agreed to a new one-year deal in the 2015 off-season.

=== El Jaish ===
Keita retired at the age of 37, after one season in the Qatar Stars League with El Jaish.

== International career ==
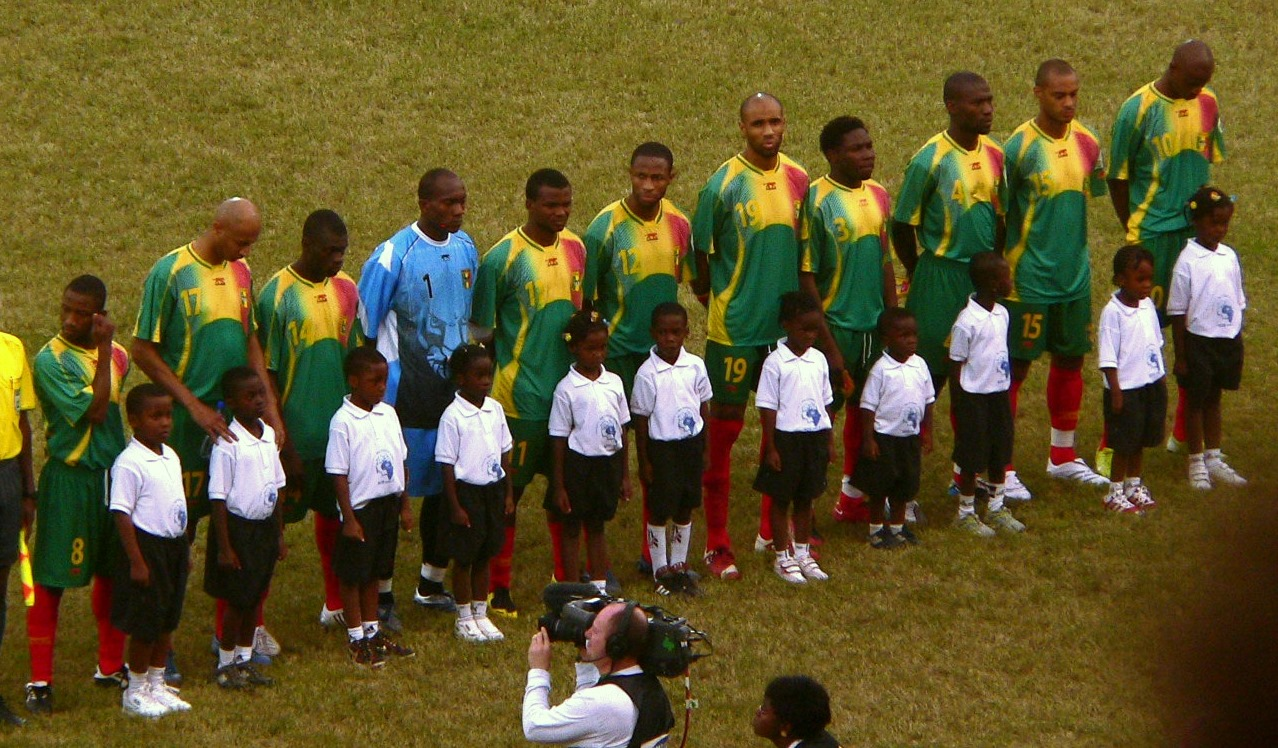
Keita (#12, middle) lining up for Mali in 2008.

Keita helped Mali's under-20s finish third at the 1999 FIFA World Youth Championship in Nigeria, scoring the only goal in the last match against Uruguay, and being named the tournament's best player. He made his senior debut for Mali on 9 April 2000, in a 2002 FIFA World Cup qualifier against Libya. He wore the no.12 shirt as he represented the country in six Africa Cup of Nations tournaments: in the 2010 edition in Angola he scored twice, both goals coming in the 4–4 group stage draw against the hosts, who were leading 4–0 with 11 minutes to go; Les Aigles, however, could not make it past the group stage. From 2007 to 2008, he scored an impressive 8 goals in 20 international matches from his midfield position.

Keita also participated in the 2013 Africa Cup of Nations in South Africa, scoring in the 1–1 quarterfinal draw against the hosts as Mali eventually won the shootout.

== Personal life ==
Keita's uncle, Salif Keïta, was also a footballer. He played, amongst others, for Saint-Étienne, Marseille, Valencia and Sporting CP, and was once voted African Footballer of the Year.

Keita married Zubaida Johnson, of Cape Verdean descent. On 12 May 2008, he became the father of a son, Mohammed, who was born in Seville, also father of Hanane, Ishana and Zulaykah all born in Barcelona, Catalonia.

== Career statistics ==
=== Club ===
Appearances and goals by club, season and competition
Club	Season	League			National cup (Note: Includes Coupe de France, Copa del Rey, Chinese FA Super Cup)		League cup (Note: Includes Coupe de la Ligue)		Continental		Other		Total	
Club	Season	Division	Apps	Goals	Apps	Goals	Apps	Goals	Apps	Goals	Apps	Goals	Apps	Goals
Marseille	1999–2000	Ligue 1	6	0	0	0	1	0	3 (Note: Appearances in UEFA Champions League)	1	—		10	1
Lorient	2000–01	Ligue 2	37	1	1	0	1	0	—		—		39	1
Lorient	2001–02	Ligue 1	21	0	5	1	3	1	—		—		29	2
Lorient	Total		58	1	6	1	4	1	0	0	0	0	68	3
Lens	2002–03	Ligue 1	28	2	3	1	1	0	7 (Note: Five appearances in UEFA Champions League, two appearances in UEFA Cup)	0	—		39	3
Lens	2003–04	Ligue 1	22	0	3	0	1	0	6 (Note: Appearances in UEFA Cup)	0	—		32	0
Lens	2004–05	Ligue 1	34	3	5	1	3	1	—		—		42	5
Lens	2005–06	Ligue 1	35	3	3	0	1	0	13	1	—		52	4
Lens	2006–07	Ligue 1	38	11	4	1	1	0	10	1	—		53	13
Lens	Total		157	19	18	2	7	1	36	2	0	0	218	24
Sevilla	2007–08	La Liga	31	4	2	0	—		9	3	3 (Note: Two appearances in Supercopa de España, one appearance in UEFA Super Cup)	0	45	7
Barcelona	2008–09	La Liga	29	4	5	0	—		12	2	—		46	6
Barcelona	2009–10	La Liga	29	6	1	0	—		10	0	4 (Note: Two appearances in Supercopa de España, one appearance in UEFA Super Cup, one appearance in FIFA Club World Cup)	0	44	6
Barcelona	2010–11	La Liga	35	3	9	2	—		10	1	2 (Note: Appearances in Supercopa de España)	0	56	6
Barcelona	2011–12	La Liga	26	3	3	0	—		9	0	4 (Note: Two appearances in Supercopa de España, one appearance in UEFA Super Cup, one appearance and one goal in FIFA Club World Cup)	1	42	4
Barcelona	Total		119	16	18	2	0	0	41	3	10	1	188	22
Dalian Aerbin	2012	Chinese Super League	12	4	1	0	—		—		—		13	4
Dalian Aerbin	2013	Chinese Super League	25	6	3	0	—		—		—		28	6
Dalian Aerbin	Total		37	10	4	0	0	0	0	0	0	0	41	10
Valencia	2013–14	La Liga	11	1	—		—		7 (Note: Appearances in UEFA Europa League)	0	—		18	1
Roma	2014–15	Serie A	26	2	1	0	—		9 (Note: Five appearances in UEFA Champions League, four appearances and one goal in UEFA Europa League)	1	—		36	3
Roma	2015–16	Serie A	20	1	0	0	—		3	0	—		23	1
Roma	Total		46	3	1	0	0	0	12	1	0	0	59	4
El-Jaish	2016–17	Qatar Stars League	16	6	—		—		5 (Note: Appearances in AFC Champions League)	0	—		21	6
Career total			481	60	49	6	12	2	110	12	13	1	653	78

=== International ===
Appearances and goals by national team and year
National team	Year	Apps	Goals
Mali	2000	2	0
Mali	2001	3	1
Mali	2002	11	3
Mali	2003	7	1
Mali	2004	8	2
Mali	2005	4	0
Mali	2006	3	0
Mali	2007	9	4
Mali	2008	11	4
Mali	2009	5	0
Mali	2010	3	3
Mali	2011	3	1
Mali	2012	10	2
Mali	2013	11	3
Mali	2014	6	1
Mali	2015	4	0
Total		100	25

Scores and results list the Mali's goal tally first, score column indicates score after each Keita goal.

List of international goals scored by Seydou Keita
No.	Date	Venue	Opponent	Score	Result	Competition	Ref.
1	25 December 2001	Stade Baréma Bocoum, Mopti, Mali	Ghana	1–1	1–1	Friendly	
2	10 January 2002	Stade Abdoulaye Makoro Cissoko, Kayes, Mali	Zambia	1–1	1–1	Friendly	
3	19 January 2002	Stade du 26 Mars, Bamako, Mali	Liberia	1–1	1–1	2002 Africa Cup of Nations	
4	13 October 2002	Stade du 26 Mars, Bamako, Mali	Seychelles	1–0	3–0	2004 Africa Cup of Nations qualification	
5	10 October 2003	Estádio 24 de Setembro, Bissau, Guinea-Bissau	Guinea-Bissau	1–0	2–1	2006 FIFA World Cup qualification	
6	18 August 2004	Stade Yves-du-Manoir, Colombes, France	DR Congo	1–0	3–0	Friendly	
7	18 August 2004	Stade Yves-du-Manoir, Colombes, France	DR Congo	2–0	3–0	Friendly	
8	6 February 2007	Parc des sports de Marville, Paris, France	Lithuania	1–0	3–1	Friendly	
9	17 June 2007	Stade du 26 Mars, Bamako, Mali	Sierra Leone	2–0	6–0	2008 Africa Cup of Nations qualification	
10	17 June 2007	Stade du 26 Mars, Bamako, Mali	Sierra Leone	4–0	6–0	2008 Africa Cup of Nations qualification	
11	22 August 2007	Stade Déjerine, Paris, France	Burkina Faso	–	3–2	Friendly	
12	1 June 2008	Stade du 26 Mars, Bamako, Mali	Congo	1–0	4–2	2010 FIFA World Cup qualification	
13	1 June 2008	Stade du 26 Mars, Bamako, Mali	Congo	4–1	4–2	2010 FIFA World Cup qualification	
14	22 June 2008	Stade du 26 Mars, Bamako, Mali	Sudan	2–0	3–0	2010 FIFA World Cup qualification	
15	22 June 2008	Stade du 26 Mars, Bamako, Mali	Sudan	3–0	3–0	2010 FIFA World Cup qualification	
16	10 January 2010	Estádio 11 de Novembro, Talatona, Angola	Angola	1–4	4–4	2010 Africa Cup of Nations	
17	10 January 2010	Estádio 11 de Novembro, Talatona, Angola	Angola	3–4	4–4	2010 Africa Cup of Nations	
18	18 January 2010	Estádio Nacional do Chiazi, Cabinda, Angola	Malawi	2–0	3–1	2010 Africa Cup of Nations	
19	11 November 2011	Stade Municipal Saint-Leu-la-Forêt, Paris, France	Burkina Faso	1–0	1–1	Friendly	
20	1 February 2012	Stade d'Angondjé, Libreville, Gabon	Botswana	2–1	2–1	2012 Africa Cup of Nations	
21	27 May 2012	Stade Municipal Saint-Leu-la-Forêt, Paris, France	Ivory Coast	1–2	1–2	Friendly	
22	20 January 2013	Nelson Mandela Bay Stadium, Gqeberha, South Africa	Niger	1–0	1–0	2013 Africa Cup of Nations	
23	2 February 2013	Moses Mabhida Stadium, Durban, South Africa	South Africa	1–1	1–1	2013 Africa Cup of Nations	
24	9 February 2013	Nelson Mandela Bay Stadium, Gqeberha, South Africa	Ghana	2–0	3–1	2013 Africa Cup of Nations	
25	19 November 2014	Stade du 26 Mars, Bamako, Mali	Algeria	1–0	2–0	2015 Africa Cup of Nations qualification	

== Honours ==
Lorient

- Coupe de France: 2001–02

Lens

- UEFA Intertoto Cup: 2005

Sevilla

- Supercopa de España: 2007

Barcelona

- La Liga: 2008–09, 2009–10, 2010–11
- Copa del Rey: 2008–09, 2011–12; runner-up 2010–11
- Supercopa de España: 2009, 2010, 2011
- UEFA Champions League: 2008–09, 2010–11
- UEFA Super Cup: 2009, 2011
- FIFA Club World Cup: 2009, 2011

Mali

- FIFA World Youth Championship third place: 1999
- Africa Cup of Nations third place: 2012, 2013

Individual

- FIFA World Youth Championship Golden Ball: 1999
- Africa Cup of Nations Team of the Tournament: 2002, 2010, 2012, 2013
- UNFP Ligue 1 Team of the Year: 2006–07
- CAF Team of the Year: 2009, 2011

== See also ==
- List of men's footballers with 100 or more international caps
