= Dragan Stojković =

Serbian footballer (born 1965)

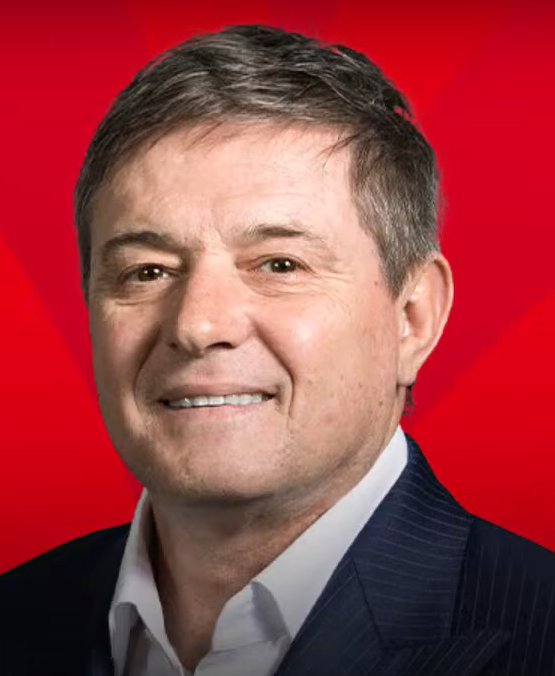
- Piksi in 2024

President of the Football Association of FR Yugoslavia / Serbia and Montenegro
- In office 2001–2005
- Preceded by: Miljan Miljanić
- Succeeded by: Tomislav Karadžić

President of Red Star Belgrade
- In office 2005–2007
- Preceded by: Dragan Džajić
- Succeeded by: Toplica Spasojević

Personal details
- Born: 3 March 1965 (age 61) Niš, SR Serbia, Yugoslavia
- Occupation: Footballer; football coach; football administrator
- Nickname: Piksi
Association football career
- Height: 1.74 m (5 ft 8 1/2 in)
- Position: Midfielder
Youth career
- 1979–1981: Radnički Niš
Senior career*
| Years | Team | Apps | (Gls) |
| 1981–1986 | Radnički Niš | 70 | (8) |
| 1986–1990 | Red Star Belgrade | 120 | (54) |
| 1990–1994 | Marseille | 29 | (5) |
| 1991–1992 | → Verona (loan) | 19 | (1) |
| 1994–2001 | Nagoya Grampus Eight | 184 | (57) |
| Total | | 422 | (125) |
International career
| 1983–2001 | FR Yugoslavia (Note: Including 41 caps and 9 goals for SFR Yugoslavia.) | 84 | (15) |
Managerial career
- 2008–2013: Nagoya Grampus
- 2015–2020: Guangzhou R&F
- 2021–2025: Serbia
- 2027–: Shandong Taishan
Medal record
Representing Yugoslavia
Men's football
Olympic Games
| Bronze medal – third place | 1984 Los Angeles | Team |
- * Club domestic league appearances and goals

Dragan Stojković (Serbian Cyrillic: Драган Стојковић, pronounced [drǎɡan stǒːjkoʋitɕ]; born 3 March 1965), also known by the nickname Piksi (Serbian Cyrillic: Пикси), is a Serbian professional football manager and former player who played as a midfielder. He was most recently the head coach of the Serbia national team. Stojković was a long-time captain of the Yugoslavia national team and Red Star Belgrade, and is considered one of the greatest Yugoslav and Serbian footballers ever.

He was a star player for Yugoslavia at the 1990 (where he was selected for the World Cup All-Star Team) and 1998 FIFA World Cup, serving as captain at the latter.

He is one of only five players to be awarded the "Star of the Red Star" and is widely considered to have never shown his true potential in Europe, as injury prevented him from establishing himself at Marseille over the long term. Despite this, there is consensus among critics that he displayed an extraordinary ability throughout his career in spite of his chronic injuries, he is renowned to be the greatest in the Japanese football.

In 2021, he was appointed as coach of the Serbia national team, leading them to qualification for both 2022 FIFA World Cup and UEFA Euro 2024.

== Early life ==
Born to father Dobrivoje and mother Desanka in Niš, SR Serbia, SFR Yugoslavia, Stojković took to football very early while growing up in the Pasi Poljana community in Niš. He was nicknamed Piksi after Pixie, one of the characters from the cartoon Pixie and Dixie and Mr. Jinks. In addition to his native Serbian, Stojković also speaks English, French, Italian, and some Japanese.

=== Youth football ===
Playing in the FK Radnički Niš youth system, in summer 1979, fourteen-year-old Stojković's talent was already evident as he was attached to the Vladica Kovačević-coached FK Partizan under-16 team as a temporary addition to the squad for the duration of a tournament in Quimper, France. Flown to Belgrade and then to France for the occasion, the trip marked a series of firsts for the youngster: his first time in the Yugoslav capital Belgrade, first time travelling abroad, and his first time on an airplane.

Upon returning to Radnički, Stojković was again attached to the FK Partizan youth squad the following summer, 1980, for youth tournaments in the Italian Adriatic coastal towns of Senigallia and Falconara Marittima.

== Club career ==
=== Radnički Niš ===
A midfielder and occasional forward, Stojković began his professional playing career with Yugoslav First League and hometown side Radnički Niš. His full squad debut took place at age seventeen under head coach Dušan Nenković during the 1981-82 season in the form of a substitute league appearance on 4 April 1982 away at FK Vardar. It was the young player's only full squad appearance of the season and it took place just a few days before Radnički's famous UEFA Cup semi-final tie versus Hamburger SV, the Niš club's greatest success.

Over the following four seasons, Stojković appeared in 70 matches for Radnički, scoring eight goals.

=== Red Star Belgrade ===
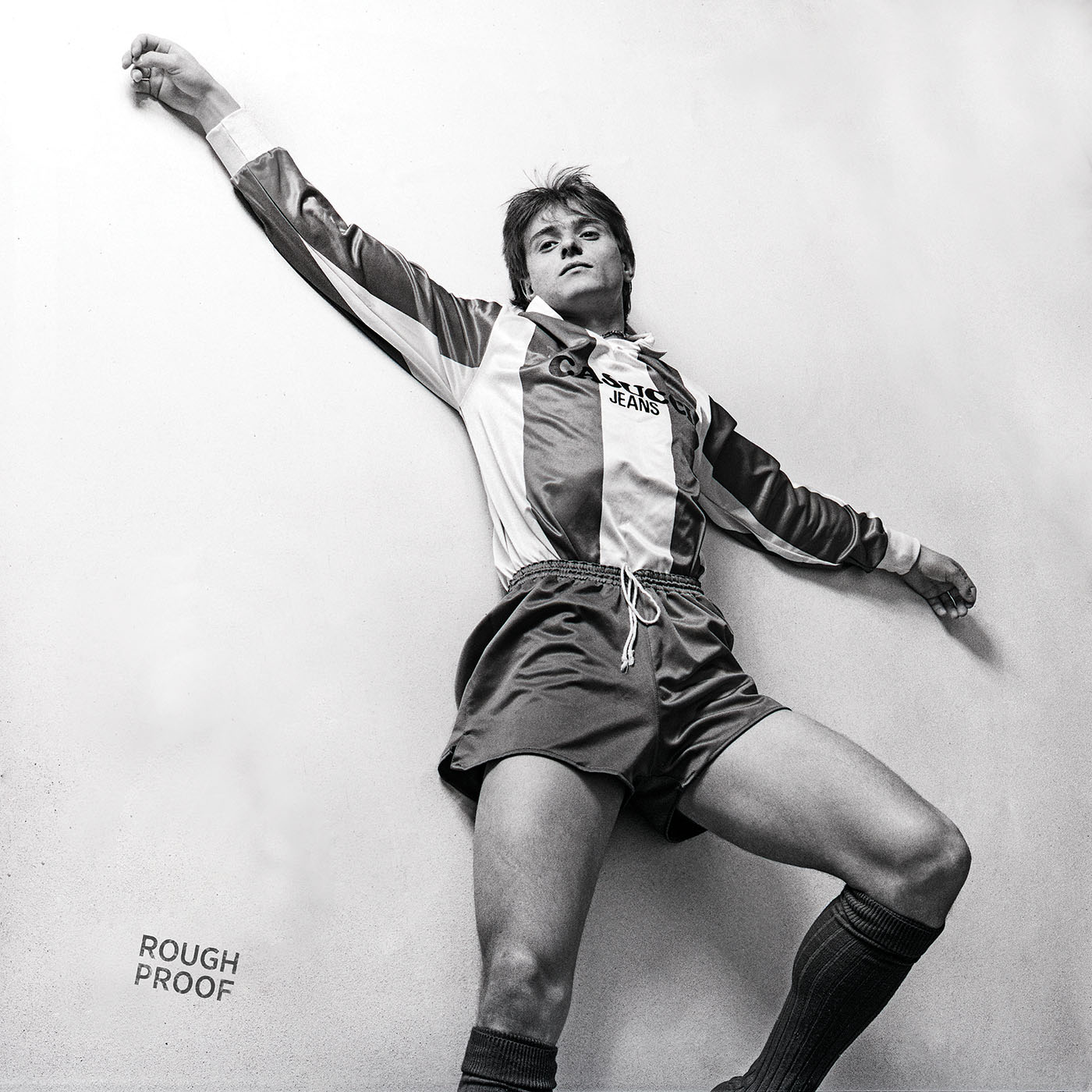
Stojković in a 1987 photoshoot while with Red Star Belgrade.

In the summer of 1986, twenty-one-year-old Stojković moved to Red Star Belgrade where he would spend the next four seasons, scoring 54 times in 120 appearances.

By the 1989-90 season, Stojković became a transfer target for some of the biggest and richest European clubs of the day. Juventus representatives were the first to approach the player as well as Red Star. However, any possibility of a deal soon fell through due to Stojković's reported skepticism about his playing opportunities in Turin due to the UEFA-enforced three-foreigners matchday squad rule and the bianconeri already having three foreigners in their Dino Zoff-coached team—Soviets Sergei Aleinikov and Oleksandr Zavarov as well as Portuguese Rui Barros. Then, in late November 1989, Olympique de Marseille owner Bernard Tapie flew to Belgrade, reaching a preliminary agreement—with the Red Star management about a transfer fee amount as well as with the player about his wages—that was to be officially signed at the end of the season during the summer 1990 transfer window. Right after agreeing a pre-contract with Marseille, Stojković was contacted by AC Milan's Adriano Galliani, who was ultimately unsuccessful in persuading Tapie to give up on Stojković.

One of his most famous goals was scored in the derby against Partizan from a corner kick.

=== Marseille ===
In the summer of 1990, twenty-five-year-old Stojković made the much publicized move to Olympique de Marseille for a transfer fee of £5.5 million, joining the star-laden squad bankrolled by French businessman/politician Bernard Tapie. The expectations were sky-high with a team featuring world-class players such as Jean-Pierre Papin, Eric Cantona, Chris Waddle, Carlos Mozer, Manuel Amoros, Didier Deschamps, Jean Tigana, Abédi Pelé, as well as newly arrived defender Basile Boli and new head coach Franz Beckenbauer fresh off winning the 1990 FIFA World Cup with West Germany. Stojković had his own shining moments at the same World Cup, all of which contributed further to Marseille's interest.

Early into his debut season, Stojković sustained a knee injury for which he had to have surgery in Germany, forcing him to the sidelines for months. In fact, the entire 1990–91 league season was injury riddled for the Serb and he ended up making only eleven league appearances. Beckenbauer stepped down from the coaching post during the winter break, although he remained with the club in an adviser capacity. The new head coach to replace the famous German was Raymond Goethals. In the final of the UEFA European Champions' Cup, Marseille played against Stojković's former team Red Star. Stojković, a penalty kick specialist, entered the game late during the extra-time as a substitute, but as the match eventually went to a penalty shootout, he informed head coach Goethals that he did not want to take a penalty shot against his former team. Red Star won the European Cup in the shootout.

He subsequently transferred to Hellas Verona in Italy in the summer of 1991, for ten billion lira. The team had won the scudetto just six years before, but after some financial problems had just been promoted back to serie A after one year in the Italian second league. Stojkovic had an unlucky season, plagued by injuries and disciplinary troubles, and was sold back to Marseille where he remained for two more seasons, which meant he finally won a Champions league winner medal in 1992–93,. However, he was unlucky to miss the final because of injury.

=== Nagoya Grampus Eight ===
In the spring of 1994, Stojković signed with Japanese J-League team Nagoya Grampus Eight, joining a squad managed by Gordon Milne and featuring Gary Lineker.

He spent seven seasons with Grampus Eight, retiring as a player in 2001. Stojković played 183 matches for the club, scoring 57 times. He was named J-League MVP for the 1995 season. Since then, he has gained huge popularity among Japanese supporters, most notably among Nagoya Grampus fans, due to his skillful display, which followed him even after his retirement. Fans commemorated him by chanting "Ale Piksi" whenever he scored a goal.

== International career ==
=== Youth level ===
Stojković made his under-21 debut on 11 October 1983 versus Norway in Pančevo as part of qualifying for the 1984 UEFA European Under-21 Championship. Playing under head coach Ivan Toplak, the youngster from Radnički Niš scored on his debut as Yugoslavia won 6–2.

=== Senior team ===
Stojković made 84 career international appearances, scoring 15 times, those split between the SFR Yugoslavia national team and the FR Yugoslavia national team. He played for the former in UEFA Euro 1984, 1984 Summer Olympics, 1988 Summer Olympics and the 1990 FIFA World Cup and for the latter in the 1998 FIFA World Cup and UEFA Euro 2000. He made his international debut on 12 November 1983 in a scoreless draw against France.

At the 1990 World Cup, Stojković scored both goals in Yugoslavia's 2–1 round-of-16 defeat of Spain in Verona. In the quarter-final, he was one of three Yugoslavs to miss in the 3–2 penalty shootout defeat to finalists Argentina.

He was later called to UEFA Euro 1992, but the nation would be suspended due to the Yugoslav Wars. After being part of team in 1998 FIFA World Cup (scoring in a 2–2 draw against Germany in the team's second group match) and UEFA Euro 2000, his final international match was against the country he spent much of his playing career in, Japan, on 4 July 2001.

== Style of play ==
A highly skilful midfield playmaker, Stojković is considered to be one of the greatest players ever to come out of former Yugoslavia; he was also capable of playing as an attacking midfielder, as a central midfielder, or as a forward, and was even used as a target–man on occasion. A quick, opportunistic, and unpredictable player, he was known in particular for his vision, creativity, and passing ability, as well as his excellent technique and dribbling skills, which enabled him to beat several opponents, and earned him the nickname "the Maradona of the Balkans." Despite his talent, however, his career was affected by several injuries, which hindered his potential.

== Administrative career ==
=== FA president ===
Upon retiring in 2001, 36-year-old Stojković immediately became the Serbian Football Association president, succeeding Miljan Miljanić.

During that period he was elected as a member of the UEFA technical committee and member of FIFA football committee for an 8-year term.

=== Red Star Belgrade president ===
In July 2005, Stojković became the president of Red Star Belgrade. Similar to his FA appointment four years earlier, Stojković again became a successor to another tenured, larger than life figure in Serbian football, Dragan Džajić, who had occupied various leading posts within the club's management over the preceding 26 years. The transfer of power was full of controversy with plenty of lobbying behind the scenes and at times open feuding in the press.

==== 2005–06 season ====
One of Stojković's first orders of business ahead of the 2005–06 season was firing the head coach he inherited, Ratko Dostanić, and bringing Walter Zenga who thus became the first foreigner ever to coach Red Star. Calling on his Japan connections, Stojković also got Toyota Motor Corporation to invest in the club through a shirt sponsorship deal. Additionally, he also opened the club's doors to various prominent Serbian companies like Delta Holding and Telekom Srbija thus creating a pool of sponsors.

On the player personnel front, Stojković initially more-or-less continued the existing "buy low sell high" policy that meant players were mostly recruited from Red Star's own youth system or smaller clubs throughout Serbia and Montenegro, and then sold abroad as soon as they gained some exposure on the European scene. Stojković's most prominent initial move was loaning out striker Marko Pantelić to Hertha Berlin for €250,000 on the last day of the summer 2005 transfer window (Pantelić would eventually be sold to Hertha for additional €1.5 million in April 2006). On the other hand, 20-year-old striker Milan Purović and 22-year-old keeper Vladimir Stojković were brought to the club from Budućnost Podgorica and FK Zemun, respectively. Additionally, by bringing in Ghanaian midfielder Haminu Dramani, president Stojković indicated he was also interested in affordable foreign imports, which would soon become a staple of his transfer policy. All three new arrivals gelled well with the existing squad (featuring the likes of Nikola Žigić, Boško Janković, Milan Biševac, Dušan Basta, Nenad Kovačević, Aleksandar Luković, and Milan Dudić), as Red Star jumped out to a lead in the league, including a 2–0 home win against the cross-town rivals FK Partizan in mid-October 2005.

Simultaneously, the club also played some inspired football in the UEFA Cup—including a notable 3–1 home win versus AS Roma—before being prevented from progressing to the eight-finals stage during the group's last matchday away at RC Strasbourg via a goal by Kevin Gameiro deep into injury time.

The squad was further strengthened during the 2005-06 winter transfer window, especially the spots upfront, with the arrivals of attacking midfielder Igor Burzanović from Budućnost Podgorica, Japanese forward Takayuki Suzuki, midfielder Nenad Milijaš from FK Zemun, and striker Dušan Đokić from FK Voždovac. Red Star comfortably won the league-cup double, losing only two league matches during the season.

==== 2006–07 season ====
Winning the double combined with some fine European outings during the previous season raised the fans' expectations considerably as they now wanted the existing Red Star squad kept intact (especially Nikola Žigić who had reportedly already become a transfer target for some high-profile English Premiership clubs) in order to make a serious run at qualifying for the UEFA Champions League group stage. However, the first move came as a complete shock—president Stojković sold goalkeeper Vladimir Stojković to FC Nantes, reportedly for €3 million. Trying to deal with the angry fan reaction, he attempted to explain the move as being necessitated by the club's accumulated debts that had reportedly grown to alarming levels following "years of mismanagement and unpaid commitments of some of the key sponsor pool members". With head coach Zenga departing, Stojković hired celebrated coach Dušan Bajević who thus returned to Serbian/ex-Yugoslav football after almost two decades of coaching in Greece with great success. The transfers out of the club continued with Milan Dudić sold to Red Bull Salzburg, Haminu Dramani to Gençlerbirliği, and Aleksandar Luković to Udinese, however, their departures caused comparatively less angry fan reaction. Preparing for Champions League qualifying, players brought in by president Stojković were twenty-four-year-old Bulgarian international attacking midfielder Blagoy Georgiev, Brazilian forward Ely Thadeu, and Senegalese defender Ibrahima Gueye.

Red Star easily eliminated Irish champions Cork City at the start of Champions League qualifying, however, getting drawn against Carlo Ancelotti's powerhouse AC Milan featuring Kaká, Andrea Pirlo, Clarence Seedorf, Cafu, Gennaro Gattuso, Pippo Inzaghi, Alessandro Costacurta, etc. in the next qualifying round proved too difficult to overcome, as the Belgrade club lost 1–3 on aggregate. Failure to reach the Champions League group stage prompted another round of transfers out of the club with captain Nenad Kovačević sold to RC Lens, Boško Janković to RCD Mallorca, and finally the club's most prized asset Nikola Žigić to Racing Santander while Milan Biševac's future transfer to Lens effective 2006-07 winter transfer window was already agreed upon in advance.

On the other hand, Ecuadorian defensive midfielder Segundo Castillo joined the club towards the end of the transfer window. Finally, on the last day of the summer 2006 transfer window Stojković brought in the club's most prominent foreign acquisition to date and since, thirty-three-year-old Aílton who had been the Bundesliga top scorer only two years prior.

On 12 October 2007 Stojković announced that he was stepping down as the president of Red Star Belgrade.

==== Continued fallout ====
In April 2009, at a press conference announcing the club's current debt to be €22.3 million, Red Star Belgrade general secretary Saša Kozić (subordinate to club president Dan Tana) accused the former club president Stojković of "running the club irresponsibly, to say the least".

Kozić—who had much like the current president Tana been part of the club's managing board during Stojković's 2005-2007 club presidency—added that Red Star's operating expenses had increased significantly under Stojković to €1.5–2 million per month, including the salaries of club officials doubling during 2007 as well as promotional expenses (normally at €100,000) ballooning to €1.1 million over the two-year period. He added that in total the club had spent almost €50 million during Stojković's two-year presidency; funds obtained either through bank loans or from player sales. Responding to Kozić's accusations, Nagoya head coach Stojković "rejected them categorically", claiming his physical absence from Serbia is being used as "cover-up for Red Star's bad business results". Despite his status as the club's playing legend as well as its official fifth star, ever since his 2007 resignation from the post of Red Star president, Stojković has had a contentious relationship with a section of the club's ultras, Delije, who blame him for "jumping ship and leaving a financial mess behind". The situation has flared up on several occasions over the years since. In January 2012, while having coffee at a Red Star Belgrade licensed and operated cafe within the club's Marakana stadium, Nagoya head coach Stojković—in town for the funeral of Miljan Miljanić—was forced to leave his old club's premises by a group of three Delije following an uncomfortable verbal exchange during which the club's former president was reportedly told he's "not welcome". The incident led to club's current president Vladan Lukić expressing "shock and dismay" and announcing personal intention of inviting Stojković for a cup of coffee in his office, stating "the club's doors are always open to him" while adding that "it's superfluous to explain what Dragan Stojković means to this club".

Stojković, for his part, mostly shrugged off the incident as "three young men, one of whom I recognized as the ultra fan group leader back from my [club presidential] tenure, walking up to me and telling me they're not permitting me to be there" while further dismissing their action as being motivated by "dislike of me because I had had a clear code of conduct that excluded them [club's ultra fans] from influencing club policy and prevented them from enjoying certain [financial] benefits". Within days, Delije put out a press release asking Stojković for detailed explanation of club's finances during his presidential tenure, specifically posing a question to him "how's it possible to take over a club with debts of €5 million and then depart two years later, leaving the same club with €20 million in debts while simultaneously over the same period receiving €40 million worth of transfer fees for sold players".

In November 2012—amidst Red Star's 2008-2009 club president Dan Tana's announcement of writing-off the €600,000 that the entrepreneur had reportedly given the cash-strapped club out of his own pocket during his club presidency—Stojković too announced he's willing to forget the €32,000 the club had reportedly owed him due to Stojković reportedly paying the amount out of his own pocket for the players' hotel stay during the club's away trip to Milan. Stojković reportedly decided to forgive the club's debt to him after previously refusing to do so when asked to during Vladan Lukić's club presidency.

The antagonism between Delije and Stojković reignited again in late May 2022, more than 10 years after the initial 2012 cafe incident, when Stojković—now Serbia national team head coach—came to the Marakana to watch the Serbian Cup final. Knowing he'll be at the match in person, some of the Delije unfurled a sizable banner calling Stojković out again over his 2005-2007 time as club president, claiming it set up a "decade-long calamity for the club".

== Personal life ==
Stojković was one of the signatories of the list of support for Aleksandar Vučić – Serbia Must Not Stop ahead of the 2023 Serbian parliamentary election.

== Managerial career ==
=== Nagoya Grampus ===
Stojković returned to Japan to take over as manager of his former club, Nagoya Grampus, on 22 January 2008. On 15 March 2008 the former J.League MVP won his first game as manager as Nagoya Grampus stunned AFC Champions League 2007 Champions Urawa Reds 2–0 at Urawa's home, the Saitama Stadium. Despite his glorious playing career at Nagoya, some Nagoya fans were initially worried about his lack of experience as a coach; however, his team finished in 3rd place and he led the club to AFC Champions League for the first time in his debut season.

In a 2009 J.League match between Yokohama F. Marinos and Nagoya Grampus, Stojković amazed everyone by scoring a goal from his technical area. One of the players had just been injured, so the goalkeeper Tetsuya Enomoto kicked the ball out of play to stop the game. Stojković got out of his seat in the dugout and volleyed the ball, which went high into the air before dipping into goal. For this action he was sent off by the referee.

On 20 November 2010, Stojković led Grampus to the J. League title, the club's first. Stojković has stated that he had learnt a lot about football from former manager Arsène Wenger, who had led the club to their previous best showing in 1995 when they finished runners-up and Emperor's Cup champions, and had kept regular contact with him, with Wenger giving him advice and congratulating him on the club's success. Stojković has been named by Wenger as the person he would like to take over Arsenal when he has gone stating "Our ideas are the same and we both strive for perfect football." After the successful 2010 season, Stojković was awarded the J. League Manager of the Year.

=== Guangzhou R&F ===
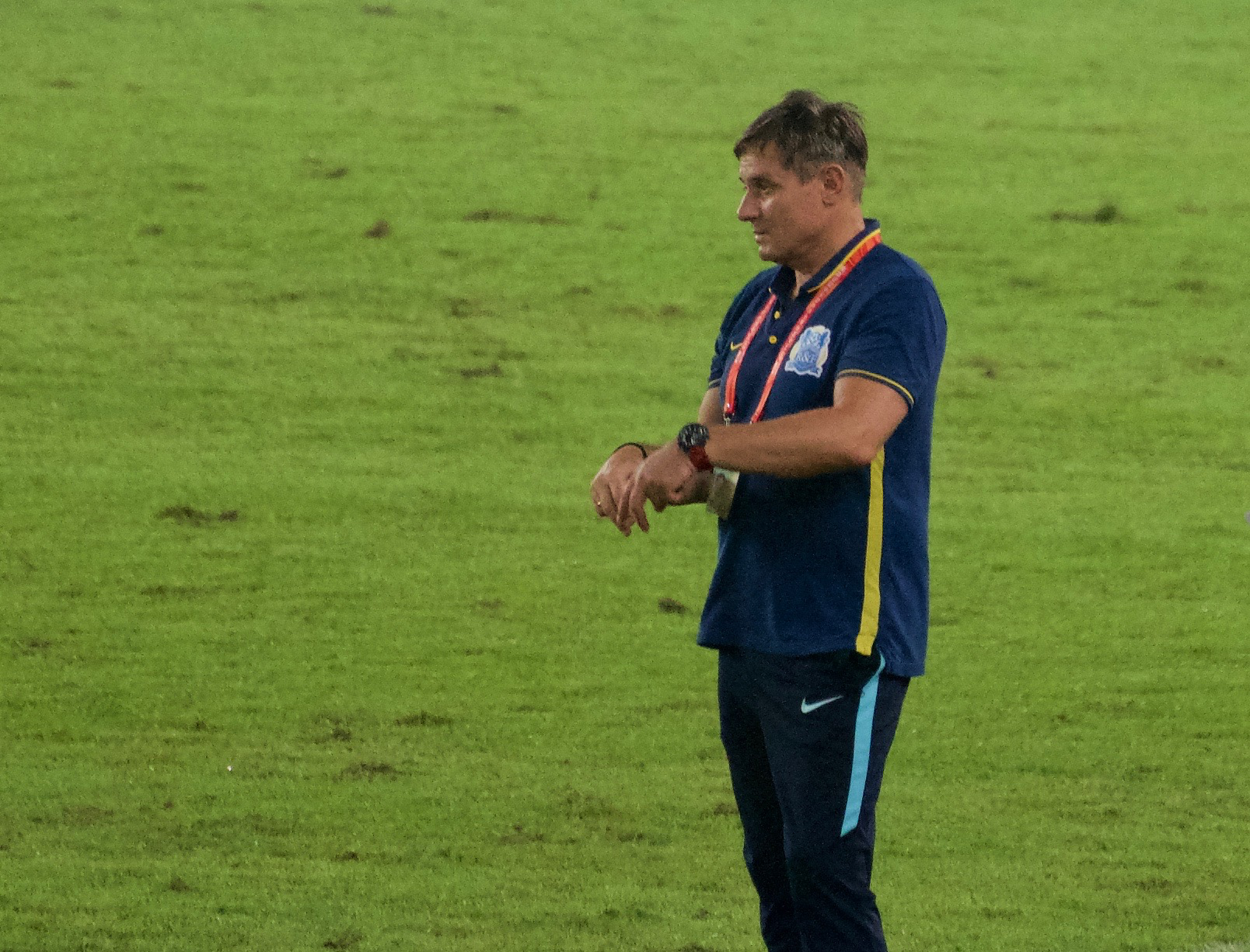
Stojković managing Guangzhou R&F in 2016

Stojković was announced as manager of Chinese Super League side Guangzhou R&F on 24 August 2015 on a contract that would expire in 2017. On 8 September 2016, Guangzhou R&F confirmed that Stojković had signed a renewed contract with Guangzhou R&F until the end of the 2020. Stojković saved the team from the threat of relegation in 2015. The rest of his time in charge was characterised by attacking football, with striker Eran Zahavi twice winning the CSL golden boot award. Guangzhou R&F also made the semi-finals of the CFA Cup in 2016 and 2018, and just missed out on qualifying for the Asian Champions League in 2017. The team finished 12th in the 2019 Super League and had the league's worst defensive record, conceding 72 goals in 30 games. After spending over four seasons at the club - making him Guangzhou R&F's longest ever serving manager - Stojkovic left the club in January 2020.

=== Serbia ===
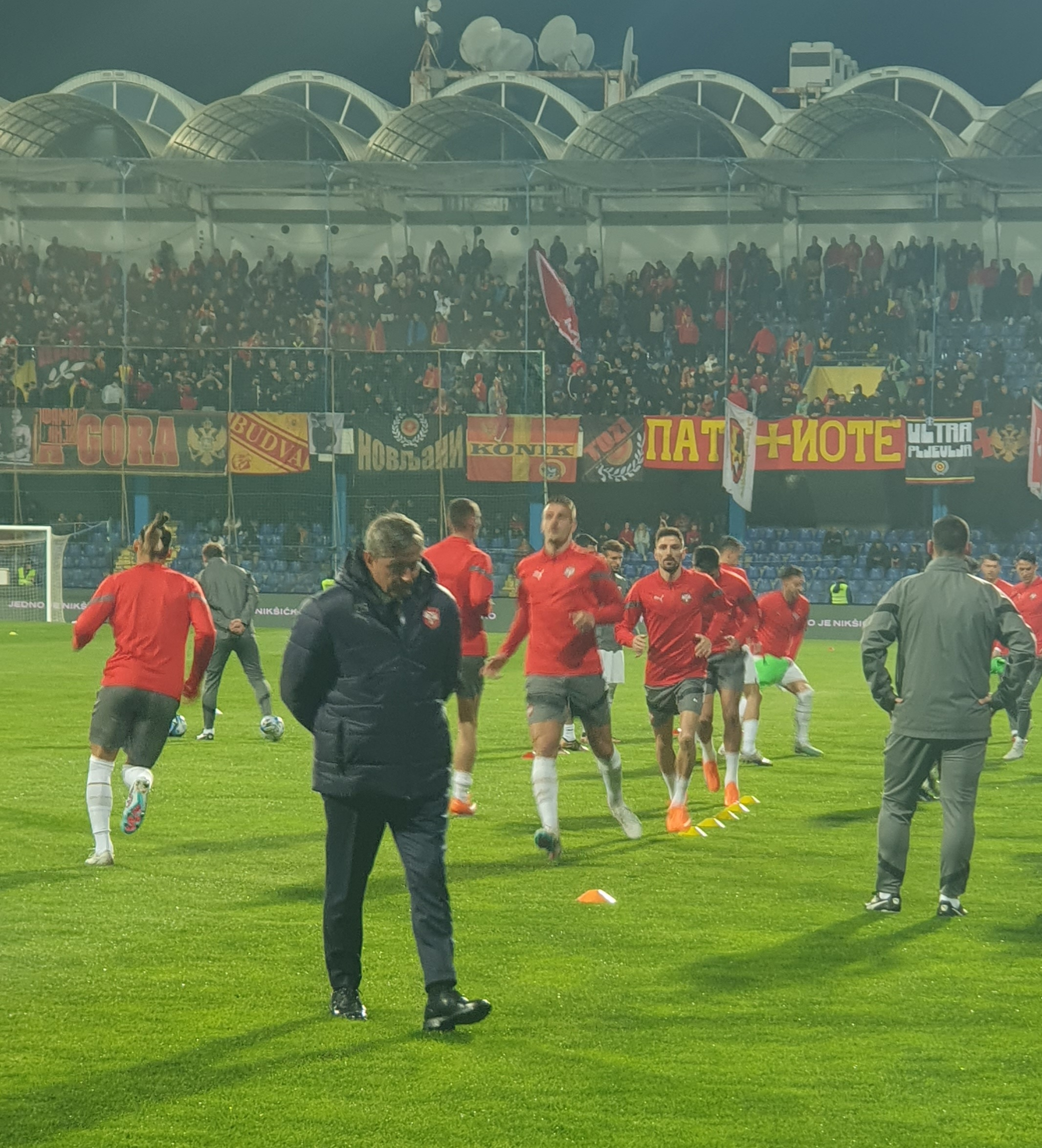
Stojković (in black) as manager of Serbia in 2023

On 3 March 2021, his birthday, Stojković was appointed new manager of the Serbia national team. Under his leadership Serbia qualified for the 2022 FIFA World Cup at the top of their Group A, after 2–1 win over Portugal in the last match with Aleksandar Mitrović scoring in the 90th minute.

In the 2022 World Cup, Serbia were in Group G with Brazil, Cameroon, and Switzerland. They earned one draw and two losses, finishing last in the group and were eliminated. In the Euro 2024 qualifying, Serbia secured their first-ever finals berth as an independent nation after drawing 2–2 with Bulgaria in their final group match, as they qualified as runners-up in their Group G. At Euro 2024, they finished last in their group with two draws and one loss.

On October 11, 2025, Stojković resigned from his job after a 1–0 home loss to Albania during the 2026 World Cup qualifying.

=== Shandong Taishan ===
On 16 November 2026, Stojković was appointed new manager of the Shandong Taishan.

== Career statistics ==
=== International ===
Appearances and goals by national team and year
| National team | Year | Apps | Goals |
|---|---|---|---|
| SFR Yugoslavia | 1983 | 1 | 0 |
| SFR Yugoslavia | 1984 | 5 | 2 |
| SFR Yugoslavia | 1985 | 2 | 0 |
| SFR Yugoslavia | 1986 | 0 | 0 |
| SFR Yugoslavia | 1987 | 5 | 2 |
| SFR Yugoslavia | 1988 | 6 | 2 |
| SFR Yugoslavia | 1989 | 11 | 1 |
| SFR Yugoslavia | 1990 | 9 | 2 |
| SFR Yugoslavia | 1991 | 1 | 0 |
| SFR Yugoslavia | 1992 | 1 | 0 |
| FR Yugoslavia | 1993 | 0 | 0 |
| FR Yugoslavia | 1994 | 2 | 0 |
| FR Yugoslavia | 1995 | 3 | 0 |
| FR Yugoslavia | 1996 | 8 | 3 |
| FR Yugoslavia | 1997 | 7 | 0 |
| FR Yugoslavia | 1998 | 10 | 1 |
| FR Yugoslavia | 1999 | 4 | 2 |
| FR Yugoslavia | 2000 | 7 | 0 |
| FR Yugoslavia | 2001 | 2 | 0 |
| Total | | 84 | 15 |

Scores and results list Yugoslavia's goal tally first, score column indicates score after each Stojković goal.

List of international goals scored by Dragan Stojković
| No. | Date | Venue | Opponent | Score | Result | Competition | Ref. |
|---|---|---|---|---|---|---|---|
| 1 | 2 June 1984 | Estádio Nacional, Oeiras, Portugal | Portugal | 3–2 | 3–2 | Friendly | |
| 2 | 19 June 1984 | Stade Geoffroy-Guichard, Saint-Étienne, France | France | 2–3 | 2–3 | UEFA Euro 1984 | |
| 3 | 25 March 1987 | Gradski stadion Banja Luka, Banja Luka, Yugoslavia | Austria | 2–0 | 4–0 | Friendly | |
| 4 | 29 April 1987 | Windsor Park, Belfast, United Kingdom | Northern Ireland | 1–1 | 2–1 | UEFA Euro 1988 qualification | |
| 5 | 23 March 1988 | Vetch Field, Swansea, Wales | Wales | 1–1 | 2–1 | Friendly | |
| 6 | 19 November 1988 | JNA Stadium, Belgrade, Yugoslavia | France | 3–2 | 3–2 | 1990 FIFA World Cup qualification | |
| 7 | 14 June 1989 | Ullevaal Stadion, Oslo, Norway | Norway | 1–0 | 2–1 | 1990 FIFA World Cup qualification | |
| 8 | 26 June 1990 | Stadio Marcantonio Bentegodi, Verona, Italy | Spain | 1–0 | 2–1 | 1990 FIFA World Cup | |
| 9 | 26 June 1990 | Stadio Marcantonio Bentegodi, Verona, Italy | Spain | 2–1 | 2–1 | 1990 FIFA World Cup | |
| 10 | 27 March 1996 | Red Star Stadium, Belgrade, Serbia | Romania | 1–0 | 1–0 | Friendly | |
| 11 | 2 June 1996 | Red Star Stadium, Belgrade, Serbia | Malta | 3–0 | 6–0 | 1998 FIFA World Cup qualification | |
| 12 | 6 October 1996 | Svangaskarð, Toftir, Faroe Islands | Faroe Islands | 8–1 | 8–1 | 1998 FIFA World Cup qualification | |
| 13 | 21 June 1998 | Stade Félix-Bollaert, Lens, France | Germany | 2–0 | 2–2 | 1998 FIFA World Cup | |
| 14 | 5 September 1999 | Red Star Stadium, Belgrade, Serbia | Macedonia | 1–0 | 3–1 | UEFA Euro 2000 qualification | |
| 15 | 5 September 1999 | Red Star Stadium, Belgrade, Serbia | Macedonia | 2–0 | 3–1 | UEFA Euro 2000 qualification | |

== Managerial statistics ==
As of match played 12 October 2025

| Team | Nat | From | To | Record | | | | |
| Team | Nat | From | To | G | W | D | L | Win % |
|---|---|---|---|---|---|---|---|---|
| Nagoya Grampus | (Japan) | 1 February 2008 | 31 January 2014 | 278 | 141 | 56 | 81 | 50.72 |
| Guangzhou R&F | (China) | 24 August 2015 | 3 January 2020 | 141 | 57 | 26 | 58 | 40.43 |
| Serbia | (Serbia) | 3 March 2021 | 11 October 2025 | 55 | 26 | 14 | 15 | 47.27 |
| Total | | | | 474 | 224 | 96 | 154 | 47.26 |

== Honours ==
=== Player ===
Red Star Belgrade

- Yugoslav First League: 1987–88, 1989–90
- Yugoslav Cup: 1989–90

Marseille

- Division 1: 1990–91
- UEFA Champions League: 1992–93

Nagoya Grampus Eight

- Emperor's Cup: 1995, 1999

Yugoslavia

- Summer Olympic bronze medalist: 1984

Individual

- J. League MVP: 1995
- J. League Best Eleven: 1995, 1996, 1999
- Japanese Footballer of the Year: 1995
- Best Athlete of SD Crvena Zvezda: 1987, 1988, 1989
- Zvezdina Zvezda: 1990
- Yugoslav League MVP: 1988, 1989
- FIFA World Cup All-Star Team: 1990
- Yugoslav Footballer of the Year: 1988, 1989
- The Dream Team 110 years of OM: 2010
- World XI: 1991, 1998
- J.League 20th Anniversary Team

=== Manager ===
Nagoya Grampus Eight

- J.League Division 1: 2010
- Japanese Super Cup: 2011

Individual

- J.League Manager of the Year: 2010
- Sportsperson of the Year of Niš (2010)
- Serbian Coach of the Year: 2016, 2021, 2022, 2023

=== Orders ===
- Order of the Rising Sun, 4th Class, Gold Rays with Rosette (Japan): 2015
- Order of Karađorđe's Star, 2nd Class (Serbia): 2022

== TV advertisements ==
- Toyota Corolla Touring Wagon (1995)
- Transportation Bureau City of Nagoya Stored-value card ja:ユリカ (1998)
- Circle K Soba (2001)
