= 2002–03 RC Lens season =

Lens
2002–03 season
- President: Gervais Martel
- Head coach: Joël Müller
- Stadium: Stade Félix-Bollaert
- Ligue 1: 8th
- Coupe de France: Round of 32
- Coupe de la Ligue: Third round
- Champions League: Group stage
- UEFA Cup: Third round
- Top goalscorer: League: Antoine Sibierski (12); All: Antoine Sibierski; Daniel Moreira (13)
- Average home league attendance: 37,204

The 2002–03 season was RC Lens's 97th season in existence and the club's 12th consecutive season in the top flight of French football. In addition to the domestic league, Lens participated in this season's editions of the Coupe de France and the Coupe de la Ligue.

== First-team squad ==
Squad at end of season

Note: Flags indicate national team as defined under FIFA eligibility rules; some limited exceptions apply. Players may hold more than one non-FIFA nationality.

No.	Pos.	Nation	Player
1	GK	FRA	Guillaume Warmuz (captain)
2	DF	FRA	Éric Sikora
3	DF	CMR	Rigobert Song
4	DF	MLI	Adama Coulibaly
5	MF	FRA	Jocelyn Blanchard
6	DF	POL	Jacek Bąk
7	MF	FRA	Antoine Sibierski
8	MF	MLI	Seydou Keita
9	FW	FRA	Tony Vairelles
10	FW	FRA	Daniel Moreira
11	MF	FRA	Stéphane Pédron
14	DF	SEN	Ferdinand Coly
15	MF	SEN	Pape Sarr
16	GK	FRA	Sébastien Chabbert
17	DF	FRA	Yoann Lachor
18	FW	FRA	Olivier Thomert

No.	Pos.	Nation	Player
19	MF	SEN	Papa Bouba Diop
20	DF	FRA	Zoumana Camara
21	FW	NGA	John Utaka
23	MF	SEN	Abdoulaye Faye
26	DF	FRA	Cyril Rool
28	FW	CIV	Dagui Bakari
29	MF	FRA	Charles-Édouard Coridon
30	GK	FRA	Charles Itandje
40	GK	FRA	Guillaume Cherreau
—	GK	USA	Joe Cannon
—	DF	FRA	Rod Fanni
—	DF	GUI	Daouda Jabi
—	MF	MAR	Yazid Kaïssi
—	MF	MAR	Abdelmajid Oulmers
—	MF	BRA	Alessandro Furtado
—	FW	SEN	Ibrahima N'Diaye

== Competitions ==
=== Overview ===
Competition	First match	Last match	Starting round	Final position	Record							
Competition	First match	Last match	Starting round	Final position	Pld	W	D	L	GF	GA	GD	Win %
Ligue 1	3 August 2002	24 May 2003	Matchday 1	8th	38	14	15	9	43	31	+12	36.84
Coupe de France	4 January 2003	25 January 2003	Round of 64	Round of 32	2	1	0	1	3	3	+0	50.00
Coupe de la Ligue	7 December 2002		Third round	Third round	1	0	1	0	3	3	+0	0.00
Total					41	15	16	10	49	37	+12	36.59

Source: Competitions

=== Ligue 1 ===
==== League table ====
Pos	Team	Pld	W	D	L	GF	GA	GD	Pts	Qualification or relegation
6	Auxerre	38	18	10	10	38	29	+9	64	Qualification to UEFA Cup first round
7	Guingamp	38	19	5	14	59	46	+13	62	Qualification to Intertoto Cup third round
8	Lens	38	14	15	9	43	31	+12	57	Qualification to UEFA Cup qualifying round (Note: Lens qualified for the UEFA Cup qualifying round through the UEFA Fair Play ranking award.)
9	Nantes	38	16	8	14	37	39	−2	56	Qualification to Intertoto Cup third round
10	Nice	38	13	16	9	39	31	+8	55	Qualification to Intertoto Cup second round

Source: Ligue 1
Rules for classification: 1) points; 2) goal difference; 3) number of goals scored.

==== Results summary ====
Overall								Home						Away					
Pld	W	D	L	GF	GA	GD	Pts	W	D	L	GF	GA	GD	W	D	L	GF	GA	GD
38	14	15	9	43	31	+12	57	9	7	3	29	16	+13	5	8	6	14	15	−1

Source: Ligue 1

==== Results by round ====
Round	1	2	3	4	5	6	7	8	9	10	11	12	13	14	15	16	17	18	19	20	21	22	23	24	25	26	27	28	29	30	31	32	33	34	35	36	37	38
Ground	A	H	A	A	H	A	H	A	H	A	H	A	H	A	H	A	H	A	H	A	H	H	A	H	A	H	A	H	A	H	A	H	A	H	A	H	A	H
Result	D	D	W	D	W	L	W	L	D	W	D	D	W	L	W	L	L	D	W	L	W	L	D	D	D	D	W	W	D	D	D	D	W	L	L	W	W	W
Position	10	12	8	10	3	8	5	9	8	7	8	9	7	8	6	9	11	9	8	10	8	10	11	12	11	12	11	10	10	10	10	11	11	11	11	11	10	8

Source: Ligue 1
A = Away; H = Home; W = Win; D = Draw; L = Loss

==== Matches ====
3 August 2002 1	Bastia	1–1	Lens	Furiani
20:00 CEST (UTC+2)				Stadium: Stade Armand Cesari

10 August 2002 2	Lens	1–1	Sochaux	Lens
17:15 CEST (UTC+2)				Stadium: Stade Bollaert-Delelis

17 August 2002 3	Sedan	0–1	Lens	Sedan
20:00 CEST (UTC+2)				Stadium: Stade Louis Dugauguez

24 August 2002 4	Nantes	2–2	Lens	Nantes
17:15 CEST (UTC+2)				Stadium: Stade de la Beaujoire

31 August 2002 5	Lens	1–0	Monaco	Lens
17:15 CEST (UTC+2)				Stadium: Stade Bollaert-Delelis

10 September 2002 6	Lyon	1–0	Lens	Lyon
20:45 CEST (UTC+2)				Stadium: Stade de Gerland

14 September 2002 7	Lens	1–0	Rennes	Lens
20:00 CEST (UTC+2)				Stadium: Stade Bollaert-Delelis

21 September 2002 8	Bordeaux	1–0	Lens	Bordeaux
20:45 CEST (UTC+2)				Stadium: Stade Chaban-Delmas

28 September 2002 9	Lens	0–0	Lille	Lens
20:00 CEST (UTC+2)				Stadium: Stade Bollaert-Delelis

5 October 2002 10	Montpellier	0–2	Lens	Montpellier
20:00 CEST (UTC+2)				Stadium: Stade de la Mosson

19 October 2002 11	Lens	1–1	Ajaccio	Lens
20:00 CEST (UTC+2)				Stadium: Stade Bollaert-Delelis

26 October 2002 12	Nice	0–0	Lens	Nice
20:00 CEST (UTC+2)				Stadium: Stade du Ray

2 November 2002 13	Lens	3–1	Auxerre	Lens
20:00 CET (UTC+1)				Stadium: Stade Bollaert-Delelis

9 November 2002 14	Strasbourg	2–0	Lens	Strasbourg
20:00 CET (UTC+1)				Stadium: Stade de la Meinau

17 November 2002 15	Lens	3–2	Paris Saint-Germain	Lens
20:45 CET (UTC+1)				Stadium: Stade Bollaert-Delelis

23 November 2002 16	Marseille	1–0	Lens	Marseille
17:15 CET (UTC+1)				Stadium: Stade Vélodrome

1 December 2002 17	Lens	1–3	Guingamp	Lens
18:00 CET (UTC+1)				Stadium: Stade Bollaert-Delelis

4 December 2002 18	Troyes	0–0	Lens	Troyes
20:30 CET (UTC+1)				Stadium: Stade de l'Aube

15 December 2002 19	Lens	1–0	Le Havre	Lens
20:00 CET (UTC+1)				Stadium: Stade Bollaert-Delelis

20 December 2002 20	Sochaux	3–0	Lens	Montbéliard
18:00 CET (UTC+1)				Stadium: Stade Auguste Bonal

18 January 2003 21	Lens	4–0	Sedan	Lens
19:00 CET (UTC+1)				Stadium: Stade Bollaert-Delelis
Note: The match was originally scheduled for 10 January 2003, but was postponed.

22 January 2003 23	Monaco	1–1	Lens	Monaco
20:30 CET (UTC+1)				Stadium: Stade Louis II

29 January 2003 24	Lens	2–2	Lyon	Lens
20:30 CET (UTC+1)				Stadium: Stade Bollaert-Delelis

1 February 2003 25	Rennes	1–1	Lens	Rennes
20:00 CET (UTC+1)				Stadium: Stade de la Route de Lorient

5 February 2003 26	Lens	3–3	Bordeaux	Lens
20:30 CET (UTC+1)				Stadium: Stade Bollaert-Delelis

8 February 2003 27	Lille	0–2	Lens	Lille
20:00 CET (UTC+1)				Stadium: Stade Grimonprez-Jooris

22 February 2003 28	Lens	4–0	Montpellier	Lens
20:00 CET (UTC+1)				Stadium: Stade Bollaert-Delelis

1 March 2003 29	Ajaccio	0–0	Lens	Ajaccio
20:00 CET (UTC+1)				Stadium: Stade François Coty

8 March 2003 30	Lens	0–0	Nice	Lens
20:00 CET (UTC+1)				Stadium: Stade Bollaert-Delelis

14 March 2003 22	Lens	0–1	Nantes	Lens
20:30 CET (UTC+1)				Stadium: Stade Bollaert-Delelis
Note: The match was originally scheduled for 14 January 2003, but was postponed.

22 March 2003 31	Auxerre	0–0	Lens	Auxerre
20:00 CET (UTC+1)				Stadium: Stade de l'Abbé-Deschamps

5 April 2003 32	Lens	1–1	Strasbourg	Lens
20:00 CEST (UTC+2)				Stadium: Stade Bollaert-Delelis

12 April 2003 33	Paris Saint-Germain	0–1	Lens	Paris
20:00 CEST (UTC+2)			Moreira 46'	Stadium: Parc des Princes; Attendance: 43,284; Referee: Bruno Ruffray

20 April 2003 34	Lens	0–1	Marseille	Lens
20:45 CEST (UTC+2)			Leboeuf 33' (pen.)	Stadium: Stade Bollaert-Delelis; Attendance: 40,827; Referee: Pascal Garibian

3 May 2003 35	Guingamp	1–0	Lens	Guingamp
20:00 CEST (UTC+2)				Stadium: Stade de Roudourou

10 May 2003 36	Lens	1–0	Troyes	Lens
20:00 CEST (UTC+2)				Stadium: Stade Bollaert-Delelis

20 May 2003 37	Le Havre	1–3	Lens	Le Havre
20:30 CEST (UTC+2)				Stadium: Stade Jules Deschaseaux

24 May 2003 38	Lens	2–0	Bastia	Lens
20:30 CEST (UTC+2)				Stadium: Stade Bollaert-Delelis

=== Coupe de France ===
4 January 2003 Round of 64	Forbach	2–3	Lens	Forbach
18:00 CET (UTC+1)				Stadium: Stade du Schlossberg; Attendance: 5,500; Referee: Patrick Lhermite

25 January 2003 Round of 32	Toulouse	1–0	Lens	Toulouse
14:30 CET (UTC+1)	N'Doye (penalty missed) 13'; Bancarel 23'			Stadium: Stade de Toulouse; Attendance: 21,526; Referee: Gilles Veissière

=== Coupe de la Ligue ===
7 December 2002 Third round	Beauvais	3–3 (a.e.t.) (4–2 p)	Lens	Beauvais
18:00 CET (UTC+1)				Stadium: Stade Pierre Brisson; Attendance: 6,045; Referee: Jean-Marc Bonnin

=== Champions League ===
==== First group stage ====
Pos	Team	Pld	W	D	L	GF	GA	GD	Pts	Qualification
1	(Italy) Milan	6	4	0	2	12	7	+5	12	Advance to second group stage
2	(Spain) Deportivo La Coruña	6	4	0	2	11	12	−1	12	Advance to second group stage
3	(France) Lens	6	2	2	2	11	11	0	8	Transfer to UEFA Cup
4	(Germany) Bayern Munich	6	0	2	4	9	13	−4	2	

Source: RSSSF

18 September 2002 1	Milan (Italy)	2–1	(France) Lens	Milan, Italy
20:45 CEST (UTC+2)	Inzaghi 57', 61'	Report	Moreira 75'	Stadium: San Siro; Attendance: 70,214; Referee: Kyros Vassaras (Greece)

24 September 2002 2	Lens (France)	1–1	(Germany) Bayern Munich	Lens, France
20:45 CEST (UTC+2)	Utaka 76'	Report	Linke 23'	Stadium: Stade Félix-Bollaert; Attendance: 39,567; Referee: Lucílio Batista (Portugal)

1 October 2002 3	Deportivo La Coruña (Spain)	3–1	(France) Lens	A Coruña, Spain
20:45 CEST (UTC+2)	Makaay 41'; Capdevila 79'; César 84'	Report	Moreira 10'	Stadium: Estadio Riazor; Attendance: 24,734; Referee: Rune Pedersen (Norway)

23 October 2002 4	Lens (France)	3–1	(Spain) Deportivo La Coruña	Lens, France
20:45 CEST (UTC+2)	Coulibaly 61'; Moreira 79'; Thomert 84'	Report	Makaay 15'	Stadium: Stade Félix-Bollaert; Attendance: 37,982; Referee: Valentin Ivanov (Russia)

29 October 2002 5	Lens (France)	2–1	(Italy) Milan	Lens, France
20:45 CET (UTC+1)	Moreira 41'; Utaka 49'	Report	Shevchenko 31'	Stadium: Stade Félix-Bollaert; Attendance: 39,474; Referee: Graham Barber (England)

13 November 2002 6	Bayern Munich (Germany)	3–3	(France) Lens	Munich, Germany
20:45 CET (UTC+1)	R. Kovač 6'; Warmuz 19' (o.g.); Feulner 87'	Report	Fink 20' (o.g.); Bakari 54'; Blanchard 90'	Stadium: Olympiastadion; Attendance: 22,000; Referee: Paul Allaerts (Belgium)

=== UEFA Cup ===
==== Third round ====
28 November 2002 First leg	Porto (Portugal)	3–0	(France) Lens	Porto, Portugal
22:30 CET (UTC+1)	Postiga 36'; Derlei 45'; Jankauskas 87'	Report		Stadium: Estádio das Antas; Attendance: 32,041; Referee: Graham Poll (England)

12 December 2002 Second leg	Lens (France)	1–0 (1–3 agg.)	(Portugal) Porto	Lens, France
21:15 CET (UTC+1)	Song 28'	Report		Stadium: Stade Félix-Bollaert; Attendance: 35,026; Referee: Vladimír Hriňák (Slovakia)
