= 2003–04 RC Lens season =

Lens
2003–04 season
- President: Gervais Martel
- Head coach: Joël Müller
- Stadium: Stade Bollaert-Delelis
- Ligue 1: 8th
- Coupe de France: Round of 32
- Coupe de la Ligue: Second round
- UEFA Cup: Second round

The 2003–04 season was the 105th season in RC Lens's history. The club participated in the Ligue 1, the Coupe de France, Coupe de la Ligue and UEFA Cup. The season began on 2 August 2003 and concluded on 23 May 2004.

== Competitions ==
=== Overall record ===
Competition	First match	Last match	Starting round	Final position	Record							
Competition	First match	Last match	Starting round	Final position	Pld	W	D	L	GF	GA	GD	Win %
Ligue 1	2 August 2003	23 May 2004	Matchday 1	8th	38	15	8	15	34	48	−14	39.47
Coupe de France	7 January 2004	20 April 2004	Round of 64	Round of 32	2	1	0	1	2	2	+0	50.00
Coupe de la Ligue	28 October 2003	13 January 2004	Round of 32	Quarter-finals	3	1	1	1	3	5	−2	33.33
UEFA Cup	14 August 2003	27 November 2003	Qualifying round	Second round	6	4	0	2	12	6	+6	66.67
Total					49	21	9	19	51	61	−10	42.86

Source: Competitions

=== Ligue 1 ===
==== League table ====
Pos	Team	Pld	W	D	L	GF	GA	GD	Pts	Qualification or relegation
6	Nantes	38	17	9	12	47	35	+12	60	Qualification to Intertoto Cup third round
7	Marseille	38	17	6	15	51	45	+6	57	
8	Lens	38	15	8	15	34	48	−14	53	
9	Rennes	38	14	10	14	56	44	+12	52	
10	Lille	38	14	9	15	41	41	0	51	Qualification to Intertoto Cup third round

Source: Ligue 1
Rules for classification: 1) points; 2) goal difference; 3) number of goals scored.

==== Results summary ====
Overall								Home						Away					
Pld	W	D	L	GF	GA	GD	Pts	W	D	L	GF	GA	GD	W	D	L	GF	GA	GD
38	15	8	15	34	48	−14	53	10	6	3	21	17	+4	5	2	12	13	31	−18

Source: Ligue 1

==== Results by round ====
Round	1	2	3	4	5	6	7	8	9	10	11	12	13	14	15	16	17	18	19	20	21	22	23	24	25	26	27	28	29	30	31	32	33	34	35	36	37	38
Ground	H	A	H	A	H	A	H	A	H	A	H	A	H	A	H	A	H	A	A	H	A	H	A	H	A	H	A	H	A	H	A	H	A	H	A	H	H	A
Result	D	L	W	W	W	L	W	L	L	L	W	W	W	L	W	W	L	L	L	D	L	W	L	W	D	D	W	D	D	W	L	D	L	D	W	L	W	L
Position	11	16	12	8	5	9	6	10	11	13	9	6	5	8	6	4	6	6	8	9	10	10	10	10	10	10	10	9	9	8	8	8	9	9	8	9	8	8

Source: Ligue 1
A = Away; H = Home; W = Win; D = Draw; L = Loss

==== Matches ====
2 August 2003 1	Lens	0–0	Le Mans
CEST (UTC+2)

9 August 2003 2	Nantes	2–0	Lens
CEST (UTC+2)

17 August 2003 3	Lens	2–1	Marseille
CEST (UTC+2)

23 August 2003 4	Strasbourg	0–1	Lens
CEST (UTC+2)

31 August 2003 5	Lens	1–0	Nice
CEST (UTC+2)

13 September 2003 6	Rennes	2–0	Lens
CEST (UTC+2)

20 September 2003 7	Lens	1–0	Bordeaux
CEST (UTC+2)

27 September 2003 8	Lyon	4–0	Lens
CEST (UTC+2)

4 October 2003 9	Lens	0–2	Metz
CEST (UTC+2)

18 October 2003 10	Bastia	3–1	Lens
CEST (UTC+2)

25 October 2003 11	Lens	2–1	Lille
CEST (UTC+2)

2 November 2003 12	Paris Saint-Germain	0–1	Lens
CEST (UTC+2)

9 November 2003 13	Lens	3–2	Montpellier
CEST (UTC+2)

22 November 2003 14	Monaco	2–0	Lens
CEST (UTC+2)

30 November 2003 15	Lens	2–1	Guingamp
CEST (UTC+2)

3 December 2003 16	Toulouse	1–2	Lens
CEST (UTC+2)

6 December 2003 17	Lens	0–3	Sochaux
CEST (UTC+2)

13 December 2003 18	Auxerre	2–0	Lens
CEST (UTC+2)

20 December 2003 19	Ajaccio	2–0	Lens
CEST (UTC+2)

10 January 2004 20	Lens	0–0	Nantes
CEST (UTC+2)

18 January 2004 21	Marseille	3–2	Lens
CEST (UTC+2)

31 January 2004 22	Lens	2–1	Strasbourg
CEST (UTC+2)

7 February 2004 23	Nice	4–0	Lens
CEST (UTC+2)

14 February 2004 24	Lens	2–1	Rennes
CEST (UTC+2)

21 February 2004 25	Bordeaux	0–0	Lens
CEST (UTC+2)

28 February 2004 26	Lens	1–1	Lyon
CEST (UTC+2)

6 March 2004 27	Metz	0–2	Lens
CEST (UTC+2)

13 March 2004 28	Lens	0–0	Bastia
CEST (UTC+2)

20 March 2004 29	Lille	1–1	Lens
CEST (UTC+2)

28 March 2004 30	Lens	1–0	Paris Saint-Germain
CEST (UTC+2)

3 April 2004 31	Montpellier	1–0	Lens
CEST (UTC+2)

10 April 2004 31	Lens	0–0	Monaco
CEST (UTC+2)

24 April 2004 33	Guingamp	1–0	Lens
CEST (UTC+2)

1 May 2004 34	Lens	1–1	Toulouse
CEST (UTC+2)

8 May 2004 35	Sochaux	0–3	Lens
CEST (UTC+2)

11 May 2004 36	Lens	1–3	Auxerre
CEST (UTC+2)

15 May 2004 37	Lens	2–0	Ajaccio
CEST (UTC+2)

23 May 2004 38	Le Mans	3–0	Lens
CEST (UTC+2)

=== Coupe de France ===
3 January 2004 Round of 64	Lens	1–0	Le Mans	Lens
20:00 CET (UTC+1)				Stadium: Stade Félix Bollaert; Attendance: 11,083; Referee: Bruno Ruffray

24 January 2004 Round of 32	Dijon	2–1	Lens	Dijon
19:00 CET (UTC+1)				Stadium: Stade Gaston Gérard; Attendance: 7,488; Referee: Philippe Kalt

=== Coupe de la Ligue ===
28 October 2003 Round of 32	Lens	1–1 (a.e.t.) (4–3 p)	Lyon	Lens
20:00 CEST (UTC+2)				Stadium: Stade Félix Bollaert; Attendance: 23,500; Referee: Alain Sars

16 December 2003 Round of 16	Lens	2–0	Bordeaux	Lens
21:00 CET (UTC+1)				Stadium: Stade Félix Bollaert; Attendance: 30,594; Referee: Gilles Veissière

13 January 2004 Quarter-finals	Lens	0–4	Sochaux	Lens
21:00 CET (UTC+1)				Stadium: Stade Félix Bollaert; Attendance: 20,947; Referee: Bertrand Layec

=== UEFA Cup ===
==== Qualifying round ====
14 August 2003 First leg	Lens (France)	3–0	(Georgia (country)) Torpedo Kutaisi	Lens, France
20:00	Moreira 69'; Utaka 82'; Diop 85'	Report		Stadium: Stade Félix Bollaert; Attendance: 26,443; Referee: Dietmar Drabek (Austria)

28 August 2003 Second leg	Torpedo Kutaisi (Georgia (country))	0–2 (0–5 agg.)	(France) Lens	Kutaisi, Georgia
17:00		Report	Bakari 35', 41'	Stadium: Central Stadium; Attendance: 7,500; Referee: Ferenc Bede (Hungary)

==== First round ====
24 September 2003 First leg	Cementarnica 55 (North Macedonia)	0–1	(France) Lens	Skopje, Macedonia
18:00		Report	Diop 90'	Stadium: Gradski stadion Attendance: 8,000; Referee: René Rogalla (Switzerland)

15 October 2003 Second leg	Lens (France)	5–0 (6–0 agg.)	(North Macedonia) Cementarnica 55	Lens, France
20:30	Coridon 14'; Moreira 45'; Utaka 52' (pen.); Coulibaly 56'; Bakari 90'	Report		Stadium: Stade Félix Bollaert; Attendance: 22,671; Referee: Costas Kapitanis (Cyprus)

==== Second round ====
6 November 2003 First leg	Gaziantepspor (Turkey)	3–0	(France) Lens	Gaziantep, Turkey
16:45	Devran 43'; Bouazizi 59'; Lazarov 65'	Report		Stadium: Kamil Ocak Stadium; Attendance: 4,010; Referee: Dejan Delević (Serbia and Montenegro)

27 November 2003 Second leg	Lens (France)	1–3 (1–6 agg.)	(Turkey) Gaziantepspor	Lens, France
18:30	Fanni 73'	Report	Bölükbaşı 40'; Namlı 55'; Lazarov 85' (pen.)	Stadium: Stade Félix Bollaert; Attendance: 37,372; Referee: Stefan Messner (Austria)

== Statistics ==
=== Appearances and goals ===
No.	Pos	Nat	Player	Total		Ligue 1		Coupe de France		Coupe de la Ligue		UEFA Cup	
No.	Pos	Nat	Player	Apps	Goals	Apps	Goals	Apps	Goals	Apps	Goals	Apps	Goals
Goalkeepers
1	GK	(France) FRA		0	0	0	0	0	0	0	0	0	0
1	GK	(France) FRA		0	0	0	0	0	0	0	0	0	0
Defenders
2	DF	(France) FRA		0	0	0	0	0	0	0	0	0	0
2	DF	(France) FRA		0	0	0	0	0	0	0	0	0	0
Midfielders
3	MF	(France) FRA		0	0	0	0	0	0	0	0	0	0
3	MF	(France) FRA		0	0	0	0	0	0	0	0	0	0
Forwards
4	FW	(France) FRA		0	0	0	0	0	0	0	0	0	0
4	FW	(France) FRA		0	0	0	0	0	0	0	0	0	0

Last updated: May 2004
Source: Competitions
