= 2006–07 RC Lens season =

Lens
2006–07 season
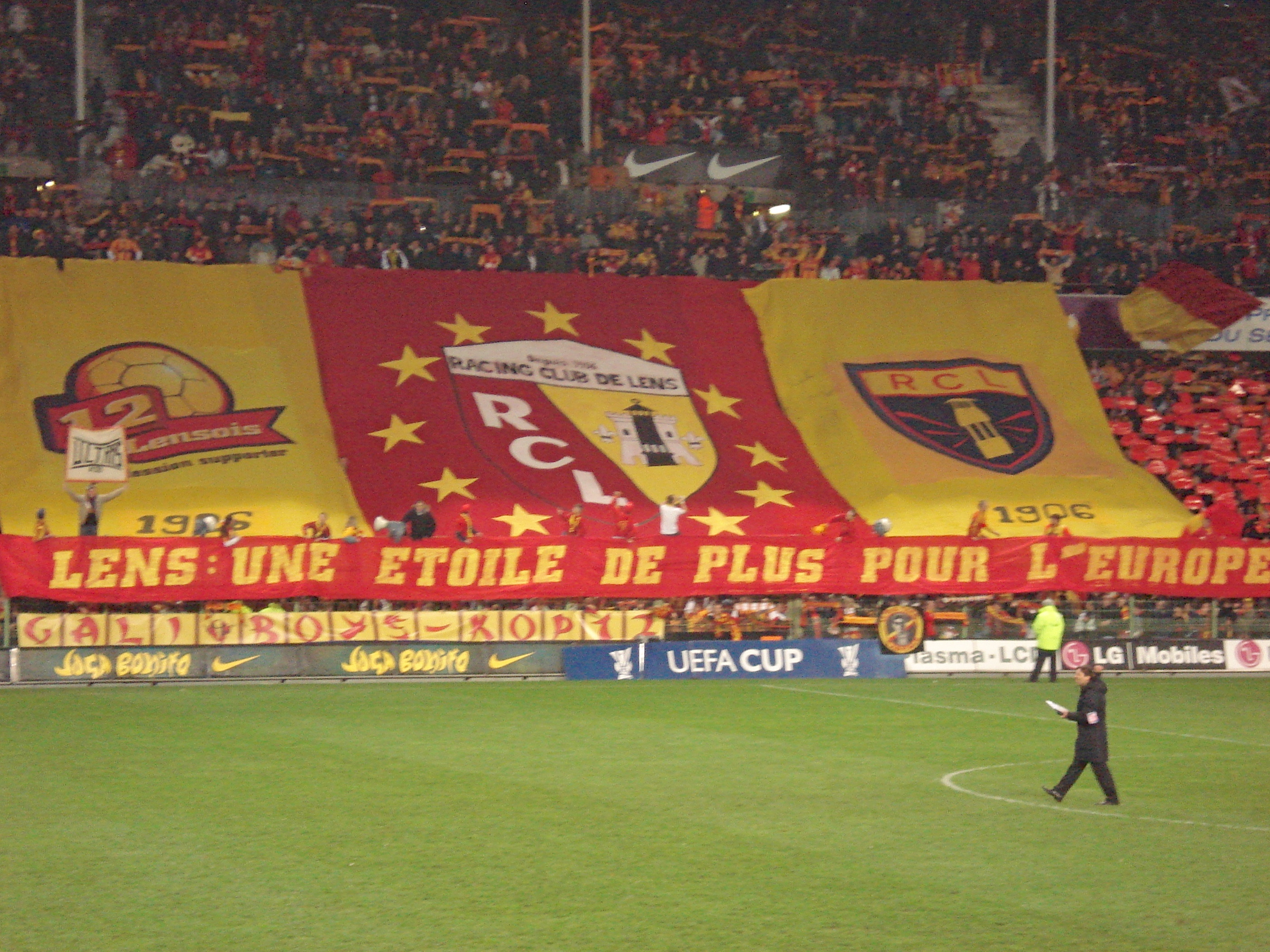
- Tifo Lensois during match Lens-Parma in the UEFA Cup
- President: Gervais Martel
- Head coach: Francis Gillot
- Stadium: Stade Félix-Bollaert
- Ligue 1: 5th
- Coupe de France: Quarter-finals
- Coupe de la Ligue: Round of 16
- UEFA Cup: Round of 16
- Top goalscorer: League: Aruna Dindane; Seydou Keita (11); All: Aruna Dindane (16)
- Average home league attendance: 34,363
Home colours	Away colours	Third colours

The 2006–07 season was the 101st season in the existence of RC Lens and the club's 16th consecutive season in the top-flight of French football. In addition to the domestic league, Lens participated in this season's editions of the Coupe de France, the Coupe de la Ligue and UEFA Cup.

== Season summary ==
Lens finished fifth, one point away from Champions League qualification. Francis Gillot subsequently resigned as manager, but remained with the club as a scout.

== First-team squad ==
Squad at end of season

Note: Flags indicate national team as defined under FIFA eligibility rules; some limited exceptions apply. Players may hold more than one non-FIFA nationality.

No.	Pos.	Nation	Player
1	GK	FRA	Sébastien Chabbert
2	DF	POR	Marco Ramos (Note: Ramos was born in Levallois-Perret, France, but also qualifies to represent Portugal internationally and represented them at U-19 level.)
3	DF	BRA	Hilton
4	DF	MLI	Adama Coulibaly
5	DF	FRA	Nicolas Gillet
6	DF	FRA	Patrick Barul
7	MF	FRA	Razak Boukari (Note: Boukari was born in Lomé, Togo, but also qualifies to represent France internationally and represented them at U-21 level before making his international debut for Togo in 2010.)
8	MF	MLI	Seydou Keita
9	FW	GAB	Daniel Cousin
10	MF	FRA	Eric Carrière
14	MF	FRA	Kévin Monnet-Paquet
15	MF	MAR	Mounir Diane
16	GK	FRA	Arnaud Brocard

No.	Pos.	Nation	Player
18	MF	FRA	Olivier Monterrubio
20	MF	FRA	Adil Hermach (Note: Hermach was born in Nîmes, France, but also qualifies to represent Morocco internationally and would make his international debut for Morocco in March 2008.)
21	MF	MLI	Sidi Yaya Keita
22	FW	TUN	Issam Jemâa
23	MF	SRB	Nenad Kovačević
25	DF	SRB	Milan Biševac (Note: Biševac was born in Titova Mitrovica, Yugoslavia (now Mitrovica, Kosovo, but still part of Serbia in 2007–08).)
26	DF	FRA	Yohan Demont
27	FW	CIV	Aruna Dindane
28	DF	FRA	Damien Tixier
29	DF	GUF	Lesly Malouda
30	GK	FRA	Charles Itandje (Note: Itandje was born in Bobigny, France, and represented them at U-21 level, but also qualifies to represent Cameroon internationally and would make his international debut for Cameroon in 2013.)
—	MF	FRA	Mohamed Diamé (Note: Diamé was born in Créteil, France, but also qualifies to represent Senegal internationally through his father and would make his international debut for Senegal in March 2011.)

=== Left club during season ===
Note: Flags indicate national team as defined under FIFA eligibility rules; some limited exceptions apply. Players may hold more than one non-FIFA nationality.

No.	Pos.	Nation	Player
11	FW	BRA	Jussiê (on loan to Bordeaux)
13	MF	FRA	Jonathan Lacourt (on loan to Troyes)
18	MF	FRA	Olivier Thomert (Note: Thomert was born in Versailles, France, but also qualifies to represent Martinique internationally and would make his international debut for Martinique in 2013.) (to Rennes)
19	DF	GUI	Kamil Zayatte (to Young Boys)

No.	Pos.	Nation	Player
23	MF	FRA	Alou Diarra (to Lyon)
24	DF	FRA	Grégory Vignal (on loan to Kaiserslautern)
31	MF	GUI	Simon Feindouno (on loan to Istres)
33	MF	FRA	Adel Taarabt (Note: Taarabt was born in Fez, Morocco, but was raised in France and represented them at U-17 and U-19 level before making his international debut for Morocco in February 2009.) (on loan to Tottenham Hotspur)

== Competitions ==
=== Overview ===
Competition	First match	Last match	Starting round	Final position	Record							
Competition	First match	Last match	Starting round	Final position	Pld	W	D	L	GF	GA	GD	Win %
Ligue 1	5 August 2006	26 May 2007	Matchday 1	5th	38	15	12	11	47	41	+6	39.47
Coupe de France	6 January 2007	28 February 2007	Round of 64	Quarter-finals	4	2	1	1	10	6	+4	50.00
Coupe de la Ligue	20 September 2006	24 October 2006	Third round	Round of 16	2	1	0	1	5	4	+1	50.00
UEFA Cup	14 September 2006	14 March 2007	First round	Round of 16	10	4	3	3	13	11	+2	40.00
Total					54	22	16	16	75	62	+13	40.74

Source: Competitions

=== Ligue 1 ===
==== League table ====
Pos	Team	Pld	W	D	L	GF	GA	GD	Pts	Qualification or relegation
3	Toulouse	38	17	7	14	44	43	+1	58	Qualification to Champions League third qualifying round
4	Rennes	38	14	15	9	38	30	+8	57	Qualification to UEFA Cup first round
5	Lens	38	15	12	11	47	41	+6	57	Qualification to Intertoto Cup third round
6	Bordeaux	38	16	9	13	39	35	+4	57	Qualification to UEFA Cup first round (Note: Bordeaux, the winner of the Coupe de la Ligue, is awarded entry to the 2007–08 UEFA Cup. The winners of the Coupe de France, Sochaux also have been awarded entry to the 2007–08 UEFA Cup.)
7	Sochaux	38	15	12	11	46	48	−2	57	Qualification to UEFA Cup first round

Source: Ligue 1
Rules for classification: 1) points; 2) goal difference; 3) number of goals scored.

==== Results summary ====
Overall								Home						Away					
Pld	W	D	L	GF	GA	GD	Pts	W	D	L	GF	GA	GD	W	D	L	GF	GA	GD
38	15	12	11	47	41	+6	57	9	8	2	28	16	+12	6	4	9	19	25	−6

Source: Ligue 1

==== Results by round ====
Round	1	2	3	4	5	6	7	8	9	10	11	12	13	14	15	16	17	18	19	20	21	22	23	24	25	26	27	28	29	30	31	32	33	34	35	36	37	38
Ground	H	A	H	A	H	A	H	A	H	A	H	A	H	H	A	H	A	H	A	H	A	H	A	H	A	H	A	H	A	H	A	A	H	A	H	A	H	A
Result	W	L	D	L	W	W	W	L	D	D	W	W	D	W	D	W	W	L	W	D	L	D	W	W	D	D	W	D	L	L	L	D	W	L	W	L	D	L
Position	6	10	12	14	11	7	3	6	7	7	5	4	3	3	3	2	2	2	2	2	3	3	2	2	2	2	2	2	2	2	2	3	2	3	2	3	3	5

Source: Ligue 1
A = Away; H = Home; W = Win; D = Draw; L = Loss

=== UEFA Cup ===
==== First round ====
14 September 2006 First leg	Ethnikos Achna (Cyprus)	0–0	(France) Lens	Nicosia, Cyprus
18:00 (CET)	Blanco (yellow card) 17'; Belić (yellow card) 64'; Iordache (yellow card) 87'	Report	Barul (yellow card) 60'; Si.Keita (yellow card) 61' (yellow-red card) 72'	Stadium: GSP Stadium; Referee: Domenico Messina (Italy)

28 September 2006 Second leg	Lens (France)	3–1 (3–1 agg.)	(Cyprus) Ethnikos Achna	Lens, France
18:00 (CET)	Dindane 11'; Gillet (yellow card) 33'; Jemâa 63'; Cousin 64'	Report	Belić 71'	Stadium: Stade Félix-Bollaert; Referee: Lucílio Batista (Portugal)

==== Group stage ====
Pos	Team	Pld	W	D	L	GF	GA	GD	Pts	Qualification
1	(Italy) Parma	4	3	0	1	6	6	0	9	Advance to knockout stage
2	(Spain) Osasuna	4	2	1	1	7	4	+3	7	Advance to knockout stage
3	(France) Lens	4	1	1	2	5	5	0	4	Advance to knockout stage
4	(Denmark) Odense	4	1	1	2	5	6	−1	4	
5	(Netherlands) Heerenveen	4	1	1	2	2	4	−2	4	

2 November 2006 1	Lens (France)	3–1	(Spain) Osasuna	Lens, France
20:00 (CET)	Dindane 14'; Se.Keita (yellow card) 41'; Barul (yellow card) 61'; Cousin 73' (pen.); Gillet (yellow card) 85'; Boukari 87'	Report	Izquierdo (yellow card) 16'; Javier Flaño (yellow card) 32'; Valdo (yellow card) 49'; Soldado (yellow card) 55'; Corrales (yellow card) 59'; Delporte (yellow card) 70'	Stadium: Stade Félix-Bollaert; Attendance: 33,950; Referee: Gerald Lehner (Austria)

23 November 2006 2	Odense (Denmark)	1–1	(France) Lens	Odense, Denmark
20:45 (CET)	Ophaug (yellow card) 44'; Bechara (yellow card) 45'; Grahn 58'	Report	Si.Keita (yellow card) 29'; Jemâa 87'	Stadium: Fionia Park; Attendance: 7,700; Referee: Alon Yefet (Israel)

29 November 2006 3	Lens (France)	1–2	(Italy) Parma	Lens, France
20:45 (CET)	Cousin 20'	Report	Castellini (yellow card) 52'; Ferronetti (yellow card) 54'; Rossi (yellow card) 65'; Dedič 77', (yellow card) 77'; Budan (yellow card) 85'; Paponi 90+1'	Stadium: Stade Félix-Bollaert; Attendance: 32,350; Referee: Stuart Dougal (Scotland)

14 December 2006 4	Heerenveen (Netherlands)	1–0	(France) Lens	Heerenveen, Netherlands
20:45 (CET)	Alves (yellow card) 39', (goal) 90+3'; Friend (yellow card) 77'	Report	Hilton (yellow card) 61'; Ramos (yellow card) 89'	Stadium: Abe Lenstra Stadion; Attendance: 17,000; Referee: Costas Kapitanis (Cyprus)

==== Round of 32 ====
15 February 2007 First leg	Lens (France)	3–1	(Greece) Panathinaikos	Lens, France
20:45 (CET)	Se.Keita (yellow card) 32'; Dindane (yellow card) 38'; Jemâa 50'; Demont (yellow card) 68'; Jemâa 71'; Dindane 90+1' (pen.)	Report	Romero (yellow card) 20'; Salpingidis 66'; Mantzios (yellow card) 68'	Stadium: Stade Félix-Bollaert; Attendance: 29,950; Referee: Jonas Eriksson (Sweden)

22 February 2007 Second leg	Panathinaikos (Greece)	0–0 (1–3 agg.)	(France) Lens	Athens, Greece
20:45 (CET)	Ivanschitz (yellow card) 22'; Morris (red card) 78'	Report	Hilton (yellow card) 18'	Stadium: Olympic Stadium; Attendance: 40,914; Referee: Jaroslav Jára (Czech Republic)

==== Round of 16 ====
8 March 2007 First leg	Lens (France)	2–1	(Germany) Bayer Leverkusen	Lens, France
19:00 (CET)	Monterrubio 17'; Si.Keita (yellow card) 65'; Demont (yellow card) 65'; Cousin 70' (pen.)	Report	Haggui 51', (yellow card) 15' (yellow-red card) 69'; Castro (yellow card) 34'; Barnetta (yellow card) 77'	Stadium: Stade Félix-Bollaert; Attendance: 29,200; Referee: Howard Webb (England)

14 March 2007 Second leg	Bayer Leverkusen (Germany)	3–0 (4–2 agg.)	(France) Lens	Leverkusen, Germany
18:15 (CET)	Voronin 36', (yellow card) 59'; Barbarez 56'; Juan 71'; Castro (yellow card) 85'; Callsen-Bracker (yellow card) 87'	Report	Itandje (yellow card) 9'; Demont (yellow card) 44'; Se.Keita (yellow card) 52'; Dindane (yellow card) 85'	Stadium: BayArena; Attendance: 22,500; Referee: Olegário Benquerença (Portugal)
