= Saša Stojanović =

Serbian footballer (born 1983)

Saša Stojanović Caша Cтojaновић
Personal information
- Date of birth: 21 January 1983 (age 43)
- Place of birth: Pasi Poljana, SFR Yugoslavia
- Height: 1.78 m (5 ft 10 in)
- Position: Midfielder

Team information
- Current team: Radnički Niš (assistant coach)

Youth career
- Radnički Niš

Senior career*
Years	Team	Apps	(Gls)
2001–2006	PSV Eindhoven	0	(0)
2001–2004	→ Jong PSV (loan)	70	(16)
2005–2006	→ Eindhoven (loan)	35	(6)
2006–2007	Eindhoven	34	(12)
2007–2009	RBC	62	(13)
2009–2010	Aris Limassol	22	(7)
2010–2011	Hapoel Haifa	27	(3)
2011–2012	Ethnikos Achna	10	(0)
2012–2014	Radnički Niš	46	(10)
2014	Universitatea Cluj	10	(0)
2015–2016	Red Star Belgrade	19	(2)
2016–2020	Radnički Niš	87	(11)

Managerial career
- 2020–: Radnički Niš (assistant)
- * Club domestic league appearances and goals

Saša "Caki" Stojanović (Serbian Cyrillic: Caша Cтojaновић; born 21 January 1983) is a Serbian football coach and a former player. He is an assistant coach with Radnički Niš.

== Career ==
Stojanović played in his own country for Radnički Niš, from where he was scouted by Dutch team PSV Eindhoven. In the 2005/2006 season he played 35 games for F.C. Eindhoven (on loan from PSV), scoring six goals. For the 2007/2008 season Stojanović played for West-Brabantse first division club RBC Roosendaal, and was transferred the following year to Aris Limassol in Cyprus.

In June 2014, he signed a contract for a season with the Romanian club Universitatea Cluj. He ended his deal on 6 January 2015, and in the same day signed an agreement with Red Star Belgrade, in his home country.

== Honours ==
Red Star

- Serbian SuperLiga (1): 2015–16
