= 2004–05 RC Lens season =

Lens
2004–05 season
- Head coach: Joël Müller (until January 2005); Francis Gillot (from January 2005)
- Stadium: Stade Bollaert-Delelis
- Ligue 1: 7th
- Coupe de France: Round of 16
- Coupe de la Ligue: Quarter-finals
- Top goalscorer: John Utaka (12)
- Average home league attendance: 34,950

The 2004–05 season was the 99th season in the existence of RC Lens and the club's 14th consecutive season in the top flight of French football. In addition to the domestic league, Lens participated in this season's edition of the Coupe de France and the Coupe de la Ligue. The season covered the period from 1 July 2004 to 30 June 2005.

== Competitions ==
=== Overall record ===
Competition	First match	Last match	Starting round	Final position	Record							
Competition	First match	Last match	Starting round	Final position	Pld	W	D	L	GF	GA	GD	Win %
Ligue 1	7 August 2004	28 May 2005	Matchday 1	7th	38	13	13	12	45	39	+6	34.21
Coupe de France	8 January 2005	12 February 2005	Round of 64	Round of 32	2	1	0	1	6	3	+3	50.00
Coupe de la Ligue	10 November 2004		Round of 32	Quarter-finals	3	1	1	1	2	4	−2	33.33
Total					43	15	14	14	53	46	+7	34.88

Source: Competitions

=== Ligue 1 ===
==== League table ====
Pos	Team	Pld	W	D	L	GF	GA	GD	Pts	Qualification or relegation
5	Marseille	38	15	10	13	47	42	+5	55	Qualification to Intertoto Cup third round
6	Saint-Étienne	38	12	17	9	47	34	+13	53	Qualification to Intertoto Cup second round
7	Lens	38	13	13	12	45	39	+6	52	Qualification to Intertoto Cup second round
8	Auxerre	38	14	10	14	48	47	+1	52	Qualification to UEFA Cup first round (Note: Auxerre was qualified for the 2005–06 UEFA Cup as winners of the 2004–05 Coupe de France.)
9	Paris Saint-Germain	38	12	15	11	40	41	−1	51	

Source: Ligue 1
Rules for classification: 1) points; 2) goal difference; 3) number of goals scored.

==== Results summary ====
Overall								Home						Away					
Pld	W	D	L	GF	GA	GD	Pts	W	D	L	GF	GA	GD	W	D	L	GF	GA	GD
38	13	13	12	45	39	+6	52	10	6	3	30	15	+15	3	7	9	15	24	−9

Source: Ligue 1

==== Results by round ====
Round	1	2	3	4	5	6	7	8	9	10	11	12	13	14	15	16	17	18	19	20	21	22	23	24	25	26	27	28	29	30	31	32	33	34	35	36	37	38
Ground	A	H	A	H	A	A	H	A	H	A	H	A	H	A	H	A	H	A	H	A	H	A	H	H	A	H	A	H	A	H	A	H	A	H	A	H	A	H
Result	D	W	W	D	L	D	D	L	D	L	D	D	L	D	D	W	W	L	W	D	L	L	L	W	W	W	D	W	L	W	L	D	L	W	D	W	L	W
Position	11	5	1	3	8	10	10	11	12	13	16	15	16	16	16	15	10	14	12	14	14	14	14	13	11	10	9	8	10	9	10	10	11	11	9	8	9	7

Source: Ligue 1
A = Away; H = Home; W = Win; D = Draw; L = Loss

==== Matches ====
7 August 2004 1	Toulouse	0–0	Lens
CEST (UTC+2)

14 August 2004 2	Lens	3–0	Saint-Étienne
CEST (UTC+2)

21 August 2004 3	Istres	0–2	Lens
CEST (UTC+2)

28 August 2004 4	Lens	1–1	Monaco
CEST (UTC+2)

11 September 2004 5	Caen	1–0	Lens
CEST (UTC+2)

18 September 2004 6	Strasbourg	1–1	Lens
CEST (UTC+2)

22 September 2004 7	Lens	2–2	Paris Saint-Germain
CEST (UTC+2)

26 September 2004 8	Nantes	1–0	Lens
CEST (UTC+2)

2 October 2004 9	Lens	1–1	Ajaccio
CEST (UTC+2)

16 October 2004 10	Auxerre	3–0	Lens
CEST (UTC+2)

24 October 2004 11	Lens	0–0	Marseille
CEST (UTC+2)

30 October 2004 12	Bordeaux	1–1	Lens
CEST (UTC+2)

6 November 2004 13	Lens	0–1	Lyon
CEST (UTC+2)			Itandje 36' (o.g.)

13 November 2004 14	Nice	1–1	Lens
CEST (UTC+2)

20 November 2004 15	Lens	1–1	Lille
CEST (UTC+2)

28 November 2004 16	Sochaux	1–2	Lens
CEST (UTC+2)

4 December 2004 17	Lens	2–0	Metz
CEST (UTC+2)

11 December 2004 18	Rennes	3–1	Lens
CEST (UTC+2)

18 December 2004 19	Lens	2–1	Bastia
CEST (UTC+2)

12 January 2005 20	Saint-Étienne	0–0	Lens
CEST (UTC+2)

15 January 2005 21	Lens	0–1	Istres
CEST (UTC+2)			Saïfi 21'

22 January 2005 22	Monaco	2–0	Lens
CEST (UTC+2)

26 January 2005 23	Lens	0–1	Caen
CEST (UTC+2)			Mazure 49'

29 January 2005 24	Lens	2–1	Strasbourg
CEST (UTC+2)

6 February 2005 25	Paris Saint-Germain	0–2	Lens
CEST (UTC+2)

19 February 2005 26	Lens	2–0	Nantes
CEST (UTC+2)

26 February 2005 27	Ajaccio	0–0	Lens
CEST (UTC+2)

5 March 2005 28	Lens	3–1	Auxerre
CEST (UTC+2)

12 March 2005 29	Marseille	2–1	Lens
CEST (UTC+2)

19 March 2005 30	Lens	2–0	Bordeaux
CEST (UTC+2)

2 April 2005 31	Lyon	1–0	Lens
CEST (UTC+2)

9 April 2005 32	Lens	0–0	Nice
CEST (UTC+2)

16 April 2005 33	Lille	2–1	Lens
CEST (UTC+2)

23 April 2005 34	Lens	3–2	Sochaux
CEST (UTC+2)

7 May 2005 35	Metz	1–1	Lens
CEST (UTC+2)

14 May 2005 36	Lens	5–2	Rennes
CEST (UTC+2)

21 May 2005 37	Bastia	3–1	Lens
CEST (UTC+2)

28 May 2005 38	Lens	1–0	Toulouse
CEST (UTC+2)

=== Coupe de France ===
	Lens	–
CEST (UTC+2)

=== Coupe de la Ligue ===
	Lens	–
CEST (UTC+2)

== Statistics ==
=== Goalscorers ===
Rank	No.	Pos	Nat	Name	Ligue 1	Coupe de France	Coupe de la Ligue	Total
1	25	DF	(France)	[[]]	0	0	0	0
1	8	MF	(France)	[[]]	0	0	0	0
1	17	MF	(France)	[[]]	0	0	0	0
1	27	FW	(France)	[[]]	0	0	0	1
Totals					0	0	0	0
