= Patrick Barul =

French footballer (born 1977)

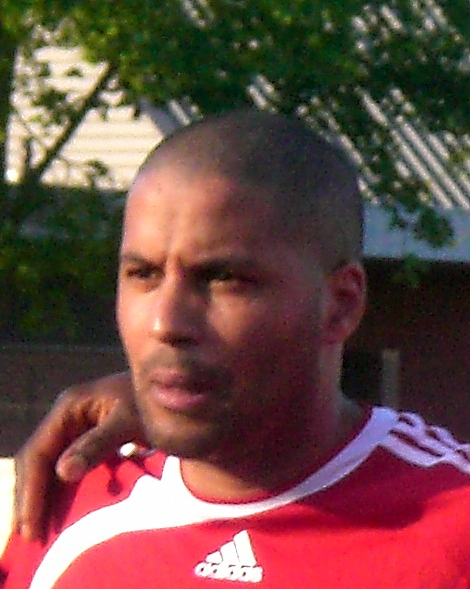
- Barul în 2014

Personal information
- Date of birth: 2 October 1977 (age 49)
- Place of birth: Orléans, France
- Height: 1.75 m (5 ft 9 in)
- Position: Defender

Youth career
- 1993–1994: Poitiers FC
- 1994–1996: Cannes

Senior career*
Years	Team	Apps	(Gls)
1996–1999	Cannes	57	(0)
1999–2002	Lens	17	(0)
2002–2003	Nice	15	(0)
2003–2007	Lens	82	(0)
2007–2009	Nice	8	(0)
- * Club domestic league appearances and goals

Patrick Barul (born 2 October 1977) is a French former professional football defender who played for French team Nice.

Barul was out of contract in June 2009, but in December 2009 moved to Belgium and joined RFC Tournai.

== Honours ==
Lens

- UEFA Intertoto Cup: 2005
