= 2005–06 RC Lens season =

RC Lens
2005–06 season
- President: Gervais Martel
- Head coach: Francis Gillot
- Stadium: Stade Félix-Bollaert
- Ligue 1: 4th
- Coupe de France: Round of 32
- Coupe de la Ligue: Second round
- UEFA Intertoto Cup: Winners
- UEFA Cup: Round of 32
- Top goalscorer: League: Daniel Cousin (13); All: Daniel Cousin (21)
- Average home league attendance: 34,502

The 2005–06 season was the 100th season in the existence of RC Lens and the club's 15th consecutive season in the top-flight of French football. In addition to the domestic league, Lens participated in this season's editions of the Coupe de France and Coupe de la Ligue.

== Transfers ==
=== In ===
No.	Pos	Player	Transferred from	Fee	Date	Source
22	FW	(Tunisia) Issam Jemâa	(Tunisia) Espérance Sportive de Tunis	Undisclosed	1 July 2005	
27	FW	(Ivory Coast) Aruna Dindane	(Belgium) Anderlecht	Undisclosed	1 July 2005	
26	DF	(France) Yohan Demont	(France) Ajaccio	Free transfer	1 July 2005	
23	MF	(France) Alou Diarra	(England) Liverpool	Undisclosed	1 July 2005	
14	FW	(France) Pierre-Alain Frau	(France) Lyon	Loan	5 December 2005	
7	DF	(Uruguay) Guillermo Rodríguez	(Uruguay) Danubio	Undisclosed	1 January 2006	

=== Out ===
No.	Pos	Player	Transferred to	Fee	Date	Source
21	FW	(Nigeria) John Utaka	(France) Rennes	€6,000,000	1 July 2005	
7	MF	(France) Jérôme Leroy	(Israel) Beitar Jerusalem	€500,000	9 December 2005	

== Competitions ==
=== Overview ===
Competition	First match	Last match	Starting round	Final position	Record							
Competition	First match	Last match	Starting round	Final position	Pld	W	D	L	GF	GA	GD	Win %
Ligue 1	30 July 2005	13 May 2006	Matchday 1	4th	38	14	18	6	48	38	+10	36.84
Coupe de France	7 January 2006	31 January 2006	Round of 64	Round of 32	2	1	0	1	1	1	+0	50.00
Coupe de la Ligue	26 October 2005		Second round	Second round	1	0	0	1	2	3	−1	0.00
Total					41	15	18	8	51	42	+9	36.59

Source: Competitions

=== Ligue 1 ===
==== League table ====
Pos	Team	Pld	W	D	L	GF	GA	GD	Pts	Qualification or relegation
2	Bordeaux	38	18	15	5	43	25	+18	69	Qualification to Champions League group stage
3	Lille	38	16	14	8	56	31	+25	62	Qualification to Champions League third qualifying round
4	Lens	38	14	18	6	48	34	+14	60	Qualification to UEFA Cup first round
5	Marseille	38	16	12	10	44	35	+9	60	Qualification to Intertoto Cup third round
6	Auxerre	38	17	8	13	50	39	+11	59	Qualification to Intertoto Cup third round

Source: Ligue 1
Rules for classification: 1) points; 2) goal difference; 3) number of goals scored.

==== Results summary ====
Overall								Home						Away					
Pld	W	D	L	GF	GA	GD	Pts	W	D	L	GF	GA	GD	W	D	L	GF	GA	GD
38	14	18	6	48	34	+14	60	11	7	1	34	14	+20	3	11	5	14	20	−6

Source: Ligue 1

==== Results by round ====
Round	1	2	3	4	5	6	7	8	9	10	11	12	13	14	15	16	17	18	19	20	21	22	23	24	25	26	27	28	29	30	31	32	33	34	35	36	37	38
Ground	A	H	A	H	A	H	A	A	H	A	H	A	H	A	H	A	H	A	H	A	H	A	H	A	H	H	A	H	A	H	A	H	A	H	A	H	A	H
Result	L	W	W	W	D	D	D	D	D	D	D	D	W	D	D	W	W	D	W	D	L	L	D	L	W	D	L	W	D	W	D	W	W	D	L	W	D	W
Position	18	8	6	3	2	3	5	4	7	6	8	8	6	8	9	6	4	5	2	4	5	7	7	9	8	9	11	7	6	6	7	6	5	5	6	6	6	4

Source: Ligue 1
A = Away; H = Home; W = Win; D = Draw; L = Loss

==== Matches ====
30 July 2005 1	Nantes	2–0	Lens	Nantes
20:00 CEST (UTC+2)		Report		Stadium: Stade de la Beaujoire

6 August 2005 2	Lens	2–0	Marseille	Lens
17:15 CEST (UTC+2)		Report		Stadium: Stade Bollaert-Delelis; Referee: Olivier Husset

13 August 2005 3	Nancy	1–2	Lens	Tomblaine
20:00 CEST (UTC+2)		Report		Stadium: Stade Marcel Picot

20 August 2005 4	Lens	7–0	Auxerre	Lens
20:00 CEST (UTC+2)		Report		Stadium: Stade Bollaert-Delelis

28 August 2005 5	Monaco	0–0	Lens	Monaco
18:00 CEST (UTC+2)		Report		Stadium: Stade Louis II

11 September 2005 6	Lens	1–1	Bordeaux	Lens
18:00 CEST (UTC+2)		Report		Stadium: Stade Bollaert-Delelis; Referee: Philippe Kalt

18 September 2005 7	Strasbourg	1–1	Lens	Strasbourg
18:00 CEST (UTC+2)		Report		Stadium: Stade de la Meinau; Referee: Fredy Fautrel

22 September 2005 8	Lyon	1–1	Lens	Lyon
20:45 CEST (UTC+2)		Report		Stadium: Stade de Gerland; Referee: Damien Ledentu

25 September 2005 9	Lens	0–0	Rennes	Lens
20:45 CEST (UTC+2)		Report		Stadium: Stade Bollaert-Delelis

15 October 2005 11	Lens	2–2	Nice	Lens
20:00 CEST (UTC+2)		Report		Stadium: Stade Bollaert-Delelis; Referee: Hervé Piccirillo

23 October 2005 12	Troyes	1–1	Lens	Troyes
18:00 CEST (UTC+2)		Report		Stadium: Stade de l'Aube; Referee: Bruno Coué

29 October 2005 13	Lens	1–0	Toulouse	Lens
20:00 CEST (UTC+2)		Report		Stadium: Stade Bollaert-Delelis; Referee: Bruno Ruffray

6 November 2005 14	Sochaux	1–1	Lens	Montbéliard
18:00 CET (UTC+1)		Report		Stadium: Stade Auguste Bonal; Referee: Tony Chapron

11 November 2005 10	Ajaccio	0–0	Lens	Ajaccio
20:00 CET (UTC+1)		Report		Stadium: Stade François Coty; Referee: Olivier Thual

19 November 2005 15	Lens	0–0	Metz	Lens
20:00 CET (UTC+1)		Report		Stadium: Stade Bollaert-Delelis; Referee: Patrick Lhermite

27 November 2005 16	Paris Saint-Germain	3–4	Lens	Paris
18:00 CET (UTC+1)		Report		Stadium: Parc des Princes; Referee: Stéphane Bré

4 December 2005 17	Lens	2–1	Saint-Étienne	Lens
21:00 CET (UTC+1)		Report		Stadium: Stade Bollaert-Delelis; Referee: Hervé Piccirillo

10 December 2005 18	Lille	0–0	Lens	Villeneuve-d'Ascq
17:15 CET (UTC+1)		Report		Stadium: Stadium Lille Métropole; Referee: Bruno Coué

18 December 2005 19	Lens	2–0	Le Mans	Lens
18:00 CET (UTC+1)		Report		Stadium: Stade Bollaert-Delelis; Referee: Philippe Malige

4 January 2006 20	Marseille	1–1	Lens	Marseille
20:45 CET (UTC+1)		Report		Stadium: Stade Vélodrome; Referee: Claude Colombo

11 January 2006 21	Lens	1–2	Nancy	Lens
20:30 CET (UTC+1)		Report		Stadium: Stade Bollaert-Delelis

14 January 2006 22	Auxerre	1–0	Lens	Auxerre
20:00 CET (UTC+1)		Report		Stadium: Stade de l'Abbé-Deschamps; Referee: Olivier Thual

22 January 2006 23	Lens	1–1	Monaco	Lens
18:00 CET (UTC+1)		Report		Stadium: Stade Bollaert-Delelis

28 January 2006 24	Bordeaux	1–0	Lens	Bordeaux
17:15 CET (UTC+1)		Report		Stadium: Stade Chaban-Delmas; Referee: Olivier Thual

4 February 2006 25	Lens	2–1	Strasbourg	Lens
20:00 CET (UTC+1)		Report		Stadium: Stade Bollaert-Delelis

11 February 2006 26	Lens	1–1	Lyon	Lens
17:15 CET (UTC+1)		Report		Stadium: Stade Bollaert-Delelis; Referee: Bruno Coué

18 February 2006 27	Rennes	4–1	Lens	Rennes
20:00 CET (UTC+1)		Report		Stadium: Stade de la Route de Lorient; Referee: Philippe Kalt

26 February 2006 28	Lens	1–0	Ajaccio	Lens
18:00 CET (UTC+1)		Report		Stadium: Stade Bollaert-Delelis; Referee: Damien Ledentu

4 March 2006 29	Nice	0–0	Lens	Nice
20:00 CET (UTC+1)		Report		Stadium: Stade du Ray; Referee: Bruno Ruffray

11 March 2006 30	Lens	1–0	Troyes	Lens
20:00 CET (UTC+1)		Report		Stadium: Stade Bollaert-Delelis; Referee: Stéphane Bré

18 March 2006 31	Toulouse	1–1	Lens	Toulouse
20:00 CET (UTC+1)		Report		Stadium: Stadium de Toulouse; Referee: Olivier Thual

25 March 2006 32	Lens	2–1	Sochaux	Lens
20:00 CET (UTC+1)		Report		Stadium: Stade Bollaert-Delelis; Referee: Bruno Derrien

1 April 2006 33	Metz	0–1	Lens	Metz
20:00 CEST (UTC+2)		Report		Stadium: Stade Saint-Symphorien; Referee: Damien Ledentu

8 April 2006 34	Lens	1–1	Paris Saint-Germain	Lens
17:15 CEST (UTC+2)	Jussiê 90' (o.g.)	Report	Kalou 77'	Stadium: Stade Bollaert-Delelis; Referee: Bertrand Layec

15 April 2006 35	Saint-Étienne	2–0	Lens	Saint-Étienne
20:00 CEST (UTC+2)		Report		Stadium: Stade Geoffroy-Guichard; Referee: Patrick Lhermite

29 April 2006 36	Lens	4–2	Lille	Lens
17:15 CEST (UTC+2)		Report		Stadium: Stade Bollaert-Delelis; Referee: Olivier Thual

6 May 2006 37	Le Mans	0–0	Lens	Le Mans
20:00 CEST (UTC+2)		Report		Stadium: Stade Léon-Bollée; Referee: Éric Poulat

13 May 2006 38	Lens	3–1	Nantes	Lens
20:00 CEST (UTC+2)		Report		Stadium: Stade Bollaert-Delelis; Referee: Philippe Malige

=== Coupe de France ===
7 January 2006 Round of 64	Le Mans	0–1	Lens	Le Mans
20:30 CET (UTC+1)				Stadium: Stade Léon-Bollée; Attendance: 4,280; Referee: Stéphane Bré

31 January 2006 Round of 32	Rennes	1–0	Lens	Rennes
20:30 CET (UTC+1)				Stadium: Stade de la Route de Lorient; Attendance: 10,307; Referee: Pascal Garibian

=== Coupe de la Ligue ===
26 October 2005 Second round	Lens	2–3	Auxerre	Lens
21:00 CEST (UTC+2)				Stadium: Stade Bollaert-Delelis; Attendance: 27,605; Referee: Éric Poulat
