= Daniel Moreira =

French footballer (born 1977)

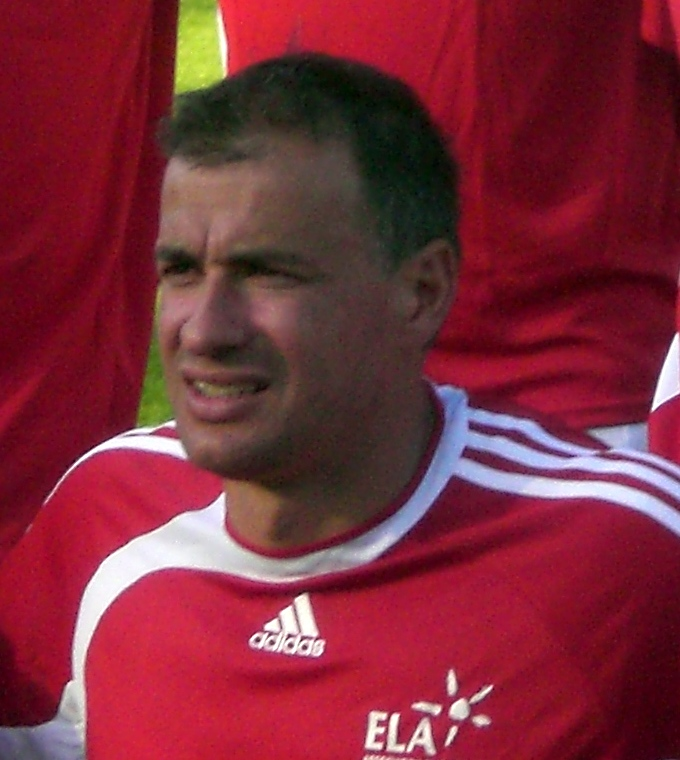
- Moreira in 2014

Personal information
- Full name: Daniel Moreira De Sa
- Date of birth: 8 August 1977 (age 49)
- Place of birth: Maubeuge, Nord, France
- Height: 1.77 m (5 ft 10 in)
- Position: Striker

Youth career
- 1993–1995: US Maubeuge

Senior career*
Years	Team	Apps	(Gls)
1995–1996	Valenciennes	7	(2)
1996–1998	Guingamp	58	(9)
1998–2004	Lens	184	(39)
2004–2006	Toulouse	67	(21)
2006–2009	Rennes	39	(0)
2008–2009	→ Grenoble (loan)	31	(4)
2009–2010	Boulogne	13	(1)
Total		399	(76)

International career
1998–1999	France U21	13	(6)
2002–2004	France	3	(0)
- * Club domestic league appearances and goals

Daniel Moreira De Sa (born 8 August 1977) is a French former professional footballer who played as a striker.

== Early life ==
Moreira was born in Maubeuge Nord, France, and is of Portuguese descent.

== Club career ==
Moreira started his career with Valenciennes before moving to Guingamp. He finished as the runners-up of the 1997 Coupe de France playing for them.

In 1998, he transferred to Lens. He won the Coupe de la Ligue with the Les Sang et Or in 1999, scoring the winning goal in the final against Metz, and got very close from winning the national championship in 2002. After spending six years at Stade Félix Bollaert, he was rewarded with a move to Toulouse. In the 2005–06 season, he formed a formidable attacking partnership alongside Brazilian-born Tunisian forward Santos, scoring 15 goals between them in Ligue 1.

On 22 June 2006, Moreira agreed to join Rennes for a fee of €5,500,000.

Moreira made a less than impressive season at his new club, not scoring after 29 appearances (17 of them as starter). In 2008, he was then loaned to recently promoted Grenoble where, on 9 August, he scored a goal for his debut against Sochaux at the 89th minute to ensure an unexpected 2–1 away win for Grenoble's first Ligue 1 game for 43 years.

In August 2009 he transferred to Boulogne. After a complicated knee injury, he retired from professional football in December 2010.

== International career ==
Moreira has earned 3 caps in his career, making his debut for the France national team on 20 November 2002 in a 3–0 win against Serbia.

== Career statistics ==
Appearances and goals by club, season and competition
Club	Season	League			Cup (Note: Includes Coupe de France and Coupe de la Ligue.)		Continental (Note: Includes UEFA Champions League, UEFA Cup and UEFA Intertoto Cup.)		Total	
Club	Season	Division	Apps	Goals	Apps	Goals	Apps	Goals	Apps	Goals
Guingamp	1996–97	Division 1	26	1	4	0	9	1	39	2
Guingamp	1997–98	Division 1	32	8	6	0	–		38	8
Guingamp	Total		58	9	10	0	9	1	77	10
Lens	1998–99	Division 1	31	4	7	4	5	0	43	8
Lens	1999–00	Division 1	22	4	2	2	6	0	30	6
Lens	2000–01	Division 1	29	2	2	1	2	0	33	3
Lens	2001–02	Ligue 1	31	12	2	0	–		33	12
Lens	2002–03	Ligue 1	38	9	3	0	8	4	49	13
Lens	2003–04	Ligue 1	33	8	5	1	4	2	40	11
Lens	Total		184	39	21	8	25	6	230	53
Toulouse	2004–05	Ligue 1	30	11	1	0	–		31	11
Toulouse	2005–06	Ligue 1	37	10	3	2	–		40	12
Toulouse	Total		67	21	4	2	0	0	71	23
Rennes	2006–07	Ligue 1	29	0	4	0	–		33	0
Rennes	2007–08	Ligue 1	10	0	2	0	2	0	14	0
Rennes	Total		39	0	6	0	2	0	47	0
Grenoble (loan)	2008–09	Ligue 1	31	4	3	1	–		34	5
Boulogne	2009–10	Ligue 1	6	1	1	0	–		7	1
Boulogne	2010–11	Ligue 2	7	0	3	0	–		10	0
Boulogne	Total		13	1	4	0	0	0	17	1
Career total			392	74	48	11	36	7	476	92

== Honours ==
Guingamp

- UEFA Intertoto Cup: 1996

Lens

- Coupe de la Ligue: 1998–99
