= Pasi Poljana =

Coordinates: 43.2942°N 21.8692°E

- urban settlement
- Interactive map of Pasi Poljana
- Country: Serbia
- District: Nišava District
- Municipality: Niš
- Time zone: UTC+1 (CET)
  - Summer (DST): UTC+2 (CEST)

Pasi Poljana is an urban settlement in Niš municipality in Serbia. Pasi Poljana is a suburb of Niš in the area of the city municipality of Palilula in the Nišava district. It is located on the wavy terrain of the Bubanj zone, about 4.5 km southwest of the center of Nis. According to the 2002 census, there were 2,139 inhabitants (according to the 1991 census there were 1705 inhabitants). In the settlement there are separate classes of all grades of the primary school Kralj Petar Prvi.

== History ==
Passy Poljana is old, but in the Middle Ages, a village was formed, since the Turkish census was recorded in 1498 as Pasi Pola, with 21 houses, 5 unmarried and 1 widowed house, and with duties of 3.233 aces. According to the Turkish census of the Nakhije of Nis from 1516, the place was one of the 111 villages of Nahije and it was named Pasje Polje, and it had 19 houses, 3 widowed households, and 5 single households. [1] In the later times, the village dies and occasionally comes down to the status of a mezra.

At the beginning of the 19th century, embossing the boots from various parts, it is renewed by the Spahija Stabeg. Turčin set himself a house (tower) in the present-day Economic Valley, in the quest for Crkviste, and tried to seize the peasants of the village around them. Thus in the Economic valley, in some parts of it, the ancestors of today's Savinac, Kosutin, Mrstinac and Nizin originate from Leskovac region. For these, in the 19th century, newcomers from Pirot (Adžijina) and Svrljiški region (Denčini, Redžini and Živići) and others were settled. Prior to liberation from the Turks, with 36 houses, he managed Ali-aga from Djakovica. In 1878, the village had 36 households and 302 inhabitants.

In the period of Serbia and inter-Yugoslav Yugoslavia, it gradually loses its natural characteristics, focusing on market and suburban agriculture. In 1930, there were 105 households and 720 inhabitants.

The development after 1945 caused, on the one hand, the relocation or gradual dislocation of the settlement towards Nis, while the proximity of the city, on the other hand, attracted newcomers from other villages. At the same time there was a significant economic and social restructuring of the population (in 1971 there were 32 agricultural, 104 mixed and 158 non-agricultural households). On this basis, Passi Poljana lost the traditional rural features (though not the traditional rural organization of the settlement) already in the 1960s, and was first mixed, then from 1975/80. year and city hallmarks as a peripheral workers' settlement Nis.

== Demography ==
In the village of Pasi Poljana there are 1663 adult inhabitants, and the average age of the population is 38.7 years (38.6 in males and 38.8 in females). In the settlement there are 936 households, and the average number of members per household is 3.14.

This settlement was largely inhabited by Serbs (according to the 2002 census), and in the last three censuses, there was an increase in the number of inhabitants.
