= Adama Coulibaly (footballer, born 1980) =

Malian footballer (born 1980)

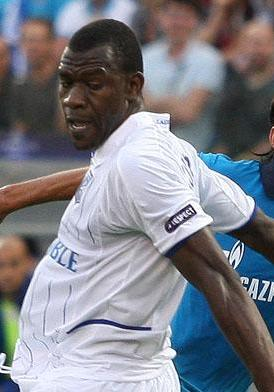
- Coulibaly with Auxerre in 2010

Personal information
- Date of birth: 10 September 1980 (age 46)
- Place of birth: Bamako, Mali
- Height: 1.86 m (6 ft 1 in)
- Position: Defender

Senior career*
| Years | Team | Apps | (Gls) |
| 1998–1999 | Djoliba | 20 | (1) |
| 1999–2008 | Lens | 190 | (9) |
| 2008–2014 | Auxerre | 170 | (4) |
| 2014–2015 | Valenciennes | 26 | (1) |
| Total | | 406 | (15) |

International career
| 1998–2014 | Mali | 77 | (1) |
Medal record
Men's football
Representing Mali
Africa Cup of Nations
| Third place | 2013 South Africa |
- * Club domestic league appearances and goals

Adama Coulibaly (born 10 September 1980) is a Malian former professional footballer who played as a defender.

== Career ==
Having started his career at Djoliba, he spent most of his career at French sides Lens and Auxerre. He played one season for Valenciennes before he ended his career. He played international matches for Mali along with his cousin Moussa Coulibaly.

== Personal life ==
He holds both Malian and French nationalities.

== Honours ==
Lens

- UEFA Intertoto Cup: 2005

Mali U20

- FIFA World Youth Championship third place: 1999
