= 2005–06 Lille OSC season =

Lille
2005–06 season
- Head coach: Claude Puel
- Stadium: Stadium Lille Métropole; Stade de France (Champions League matches)
- Ligue 1: 3rd
- Coupe de France: Quarter-finals
- Coupe de la Ligue: Round of 16
- UEFA Champions League: Group stage
- UEFA Cup: Round of 16
- Top goalscorer: League: Peter Odemwingie (14); All: Peter Odemwingie (15)
- Average home league attendance: 13,198

The 2005–06 season was the 62nd season in the existence of Lille OSC and the club's 6th consecutive season in the top flight of French football. In addition to the domestic league, Lille participated in this season's edition of the Coupe de France, the Coupe de la Ligue, the UEFA Champions League, and the UEFA Cup. The season covered the period from 1 July 2005 to 30 June 2006.

== Competitions ==
=== Overall record ===
| Competition | First match | Last match | Starting round | Final position | Record | | | | | | | |
| Competition | First match | Last match | Starting round | Final position | Pld | W | D | L | GF | GA | GD | Win % |
|---|---|---|---|---|---|---|---|---|---|---|---|---|
| Ligue 1 | 30 July 2005 | 13 May 2006 | Matchday 1 | 3rd | 38 | 16 | 14 | 8 | 53 | 31 | +22 | 42.11 |
| Coupe de France | 7 January 2005 | 11 April 2006 | Round of 64 | Quarter-finals | 4 | 3 | 0 | 1 | 5 | 2 | +3 | 75.00 |
| Coupe de la Ligue | 26 October 2005 | 21 December 2005 | Round of 32 | Round of 16 | 2 | 1 | 0 | 1 | 2 | 1 | +1 | 50.00 |
| UEFA Champions League | 14 September 2005 | 7 December 2005 | Group stage | Group stage | 6 | 1 | 3 | 2 | 1 | 2 | −1 | 16.67 |
| UEFA Cup | 15 February 2006 | 15 March 2006 | Round of 32 | Round of 16 | 4 | 2 | 1 | 1 | 4 | 4 | +0 | 50.00 |
| Total | | | | | 54 | 23 | 18 | 13 | 65 | 40 | +25 | 42.59 |

Source: Competitions

=== Ligue 1 ===
==== League table ====
| Pos | Team | Pld | W | D | L | GF | GA | GD | Pts | Qualification or relegation |
|---|---|---|---|---|---|---|---|---|---|---|
| 1 | Lyon (C) | 38 | 25 | 9 | 4 | 73 | 31 | +42 | 84 | Qualification to Champions League group stage |
| 2 | Bordeaux | 38 | 18 | 15 | 5 | 43 | 25 | +18 | 69 | Qualification to Champions League group stage |
| 3 | Lille | 38 | 16 | 14 | 8 | 56 | 31 | +25 | 62 | Qualification to Champions League third qualifying round |
| 4 | Lens | 38 | 14 | 18 | 6 | 48 | 34 | +14 | 60 | Qualification to UEFA Cup first round |
| 5 | Marseille | 38 | 16 | 12 | 10 | 44 | 35 | +9 | 60 | Qualification to Intertoto Cup third round |

Source: Ligue 1
Rules for classification: 1) points; 2) goal difference; 3) number of goals scored.
(C) Champions

==== Results summary ====
| Overall | | | | | | | | Home | | | | | | Away | | | | | |
| Pld | W | D | L | GF | GA | GD | Pts | W | D | L | GF | GA | GD | W | D | L | GF | GA | GD |
|---|---|---|---|---|---|---|---|---|---|---|---|---|---|---|---|---|---|---|---|
| 38 | 16 | 14 | 8 | 56 | 31 | +25 | 62 | 12 | 5 | 2 | 33 | 7 | +26 | 4 | 9 | 6 | 23 | 24 | −1 |

Source: Ligue 1

==== Results by round ====
| Round | 1 | 2 | 3 | 4 | 5 | 6 | 7 | 8 | 9 | 10 | 11 | 12 | 13 | 14 | 15 | 16 | 17 | 18 | 19 | 20 | 21 | 22 | 23 | 24 | 25 | 26 | 27 | 28 | 29 | 30 | 31 | 32 | 33 | 34 | 35 | 36 | 37 | 38 |
|---|---|---|---|---|---|---|---|---|---|---|---|---|---|---|---|---|---|---|---|---|---|---|---|---|---|---|---|---|---|---|---|---|---|---|---|---|---|---|
| Ground | H | A | H | A | H | A | H | A | H | H | A | H | A | H | A | H | A | H | A | H | A | H | A | H | A | H | A | A | H | A | H | A | H | A | H | A | H | A |
| Result | W | D | L | D | D | W | W | L | W | L | D | W | D | W | L | W | L | D | W | W | L | W | D | W | L | D | W | W | W | D | D | D | D | D | W | L | W | D |
| Position | 5 | 7 | 13 | 13 | 12 | 8 | 6 | 8 | 5 | 7 | 10 | 5 | 7 | 5 | 7 | 5 | 7 | 8 | 8 | 4 | 6 | 5 | 4 | 4 | 4 | 4 | 3 | 3 | 3 | 3 | 3 | 3 | 3 | 4 | 3 | 3 | 3 | 3 |

Source: Ligue 1
A = Away; H = Home; W = Win; D = Draw; L = Loss

==== Matches ====
| 30 July 2005 1 | Lille | 1–0 | Rennes |
| 20:00 CEST (UTC+2) |

| 6 August 2005 2 | Ajaccio | 3–3 | Lille |
| 20:00 CEST (UTC+2) |

| 13 August 2005 3 | Lille | 1–2 | Troyes |
| 20:00 CEST (UTC+2) |

| 20 August 2005 4 | Sochaux | 0–0 | Lille |
| 20:00 CEST (UTC+2) |

| 24 August 2005 5 | Lille | 0–0 | Toulouse |
| 20:30 CEST (UTC+2) |

| 10 September 2005 6 | Metz | 0–2 | Lille |
| 20:00 CEST (UTC+2) |

| 17 September 2005 7 | Lille | 4–0 | Nice |
| 20:00 CEST (UTC+2) |

| 21 September 2005 8 | Paris Saint-Germain | 2–1 | Lille |
| 20:45 CEST (UTC+2) |

| 24 September 2005 9 | Lille | 2–0 | Saint-Étienne |
| 20:00 CEST (UTC+2) |

| 2 October 2005 10 | Lille | 0–1 | Monaco |
| 18:00 CEST (UTC+2) |

| 15 October 2005 11 | Le Mans | 1–1 | Lille |
| 20:00 CEST (UTC+2) |

| 22 October 2005 12 | Lille | 2–0 | Nantes |
| 20:00 CEST (UTC+2) |

| 29 October 2005 13 | Marseille | 1–1 | Lille |
| 17:15 CEST (UTC+2) |

| 6 November 2005 14 | Lille | 2–0 | Strasbourg |
| 18:00 CEST (UTC+2) |

| 19 November 2005 15 | Auxerre | 3–2 | Lille |
| 17:15 CEST (UTC+2) |

| 26 November 2005 16 | Lille | 1–0 | Nancy |
| 20:00 CEST (UTC+2) |

| 3 December 2005 17 | Bordeaux | 1–0 | Lille |
| 20:00 CEST (UTC+2) |

| 10 December 2005 18 | Lille | 0–0 | Lens |
| 17:15 CEST (UTC+2) |

| 16 December 2005 19 | Lyon | 1–3 | Lille |
| 20:45 CEST (UTC+2) |

| 4 January 2006 20 | Lille | 2–0 | Ajaccio |
| 20:30 CEST (UTC+2) |

| 11 January 2006 21 | Troyes | 2–1 | Lille |
| 20:30 CEST (UTC+2) |

| 14 January 2006 22 | Lille | 3–0 | Sochaux |
| 20:00 CEST (UTC+2) |

| 21 January 2006 23 | Toulouse | 0–0 | Lille |
| 20:00 CEST (UTC+2) |

| 29 January 2006 24 | Lille | 3–1 | Metz |
| 18:00 CEST (UTC+2) |

| 4 February 2006 25 | Nice | 2–0 | Lille |
| 20:00 CEST (UTC+2) |

| 12 February 2006 26 | Lille | 0–0 | Paris Saint-Germain |
| 21:00 CEST (UTC+2) |

| 18 February 2006 27 | Saint-Étienne | 0–2 | Lille |
| 20:00 CEST (UTC+2) |

| 26 February 2006 28 | Monaco | 0–1 | Lille |
| 18:00 CEST (UTC+2) |

| 4 March 2006 29 | Lille | 4–0 | Le Mans |
| 20:00 CEST (UTC+2) |

| 12 March 2006 30 | Nantes | 1–1 | Lille |
| 18:00 CEST (UTC+2) |

| 19 March 2006 31 | Lille | 0–0 | Marseille |
| 17:30 CEST (UTC+2) |

| 25 March 2006 32 | Strasbourg | 2–2 | Lille |
| 20:00 CEST (UTC+2) |

| 1 April 2006 33 | Lille | 1–1 | Auxerre |
| 17:30 CEST (UTC+2) |

| 8 April 2006 34 | Nancy | 0–0 | Lille |
| 20:00 CEST (UTC+2) |

| 15 April 2006 35 | Lille | 3–2 | Bordeaux |
| 17:15 CEST (UTC+2) |

| 29 April 2006 36 | Lens | 4–2 | Lille |
| 17:15 CEST (UTC+2) |

| 6 May 2006 37 | Lille | 4–0 | Lyon |
| 20:00 CEST (UTC+2) |

| 13 May 2006 38 | Rennes | 2–2 | Lille |
| 20:00 CEST (UTC+2) |

=== Coupe de France ===
| 7 January 2006 Round of 64 | Saint-Étienne | 0–1 (a.e.t.) | Lille | Saint-Étienne |
| CET (UTC+1) | | | | Stadium: Stade Geoffroy Guichard |

| 1 February 2006 Round of 32 | Lorient | 0–1 | Lille | Lorient |
| CET (UTC+1) | | | | Stadium: Stade du Moustoir |

| 21 March 2006 Round of 16 | AS Vitré | 0–2 | Lille | Rennes |
| CET (UTC+1) | | | | Stadium: Stade de la Route de Lorient |

| 11 April 2006 Quarter-finals | Paris Saint-Germain | 2–1 | Lille | Paris |
| CET (UTC+1) | | | | Stadium: Parc des Princes |

=== Coupe de la Ligue ===
| 26 October 2005 Round of 32 | Saint-Étienne | 0–2 | Lille | Saint-Étienne |
| CET (UTC+1) | | | | Stadium: Stade Geoffroy Guichard |

| 21 December 2005 Round of 16 | Monaco | 2–0 | Lille | Monaco |
| CET (UTC+1) | | | | Stadium: Stade Louis II |

=== UEFA Champions League ===
==== Group stage ====
| Pos | Team | Pld | W | D | L | GF | GA | GD | Pts | Qualification |
|---|---|---|---|---|---|---|---|---|---|---|
| 1 | (Spain) Villarreal | 6 | 2 | 4 | 0 | 3 | 1 | +2 | 10 | Advance to knockout stage |
| 2 | (Portugal) Benfica | 6 | 2 | 2 | 2 | 5 | 5 | 0 | 8 | Advance to knockout stage |
| 3 | (France) Lille | 6 | 1 | 3 | 2 | 1 | 2 | −1 | 6 | Transfer to UEFA Cup |
| 4 | (England) Manchester United | 6 | 1 | 3 | 2 | 3 | 4 | −1 | 6 | |

Source: RSSSF

| 14 September 2005 1 | Benfica (Portugal) | 1–0 | (France) Lille | Lisbon, Portugal |
| 20:45 CEST (UTC+2) | Miccoli 90+2' | Report | | Stadium: Estádio da Luz; Attendance: 32,176; Referee: Rene Temmink (Netherlands) |

| 27 September 2005 2 | Lille (France) | 0–0 | (Spain) Villarreal | Saint-Denis, France |
| 20:45 CEST (UTC+2) | | Report | | Stadium: Stade de France; Attendance: 35,153; Referee: Peter Fröjdfeldt (Sweden) |

| 18 October 2005 3 | Manchester United (England) | 0–0 | (France) Lille | Manchester, England |
| 20:45 CEST (UTC+2) | | Report | | Stadium: Old Trafford; Attendance: 60,626; Referee: Stefano Farina (Italy) |

| 2 November 2005 4 | Lille (France) | 1–0 | (England) Manchester United | Saint-Denis, France |
| 20:45 CET (UTC+1) | Ačimovič 38' | Report | | Stadium: Stade de France; Attendance: 66,470; Referee: Markus Merk (Germany) |

| 22 November 2005 5 | Lille (France) | 0–0 | (Portugal) Benfica | Saint-Denis, France |
| 20:45 CET (UTC+1) | | Report | | Stadium: Stade de France; Attendance: 76,187; Referee: Massimo Busacca (Switzerland) |

| 7 December 2005 6 | Villarreal (Spain) | 1–0 | (France) Lille | Villarreal, Spain |
| 20:45 CEST (UTC+2) | Guayre 67' | Report | | Stadium: Estadio El Madrigal; Attendance: 15,751; Referee: Valentin Ivanov (Russia) |

=== UEFA Cup ===
==== Round of 32 ====
| 15 February 2006 First leg | Lille (France) | 3–2 | (Ukraine) Shakhtar Donetsk | Villeneuve-d'Ascq, France |
| CEST (UTC+2) | Fauvergue 19'; Dernis 57'; Odemwingie 77' | Report | Brandão 89'; Marica 90+1' | Stadium: Stadium Lille Métropole; Attendance: 13,644; Referee: Gianluca Paparesta (Italy) |

| 23 February 2006 Second leg | Shakhtar Donetsk (Ukraine) | 0–0 (2–3 agg.) | (France) Lille | Donetsk, Ukraine |
| CEST (UTC+2) | | Report | | Stadium: RSC Olimpiyskiy; Attendance: 23,250; Referee: Nicolai Vollquartz (Denmark) |

==== Round of 16 ====
| 9 March 2006 First leg | Lille (France) | 1–0 | (Spain) Sevilla | Villeneuve-d'Ascq, France |
| CEST (UTC+2) | Dernis 24' | Report | | Stadium: Stadium Lille Métropole; Attendance: 11,009; Referee: Wolfgang Stark (Germany) |

| 15 March 2006 Second leg | Sevilla (Spain) | 2–0 (2–1 agg.) | (France) Lille | Seville, Spain |
| CEST (UTC+2) | Kanouté 29'; Luís Fabiano 45+2' | Report | | Stadium: Ramón Sánchez Pizjuán Stadium; Attendance: 33,660; Referee: Mike Riley (England) |

== Statistics ==
=== Goalscorers ===
| Rank | No. | Pos | Nat | Name | Ligue 1 | CDF | CDL | UCL | UEFA Cup | Total |
|---|---|---|---|---|---|---|---|---|---|---|
| 1 | 14 | FW | (Nigeria) | Peter Odemwingie | 14 | 0 | 0 | 0 | 1 | 15 |
| 2 | 23 | FW | (Ivory Coast) | Abdul Kader Keïta | 5 | 0 | 0 | 0 | 0 | 5 |
| 2 | 17 | MF | (Cameroon) | Jean Makoun | 5 | 0 | 0 | 0 | 0 | 5 |
| Totals | | | | | 56 | 5 | 2 | 1 | 4 | 68 |
