= 2005–06 Stade Rennais FC season =

Stade Rennais
2005–06 season
- President: Emmanuel Cueff
- Head coach: László Bölöni
- Stadium: Stade de la Route de Lorient
- Ligue 1: 7th
- Coupe de France: Semi-finals
- Coupe de la Ligue: Second round
- UEFA Cup: Group stage
- Top goalscorer: League: John Utaka (11); All: John Utaka (16)
- Highest home attendance: 29,490 vs Marseille
- Average home league attendance: 23,943
- Biggest defeat: Nancy 6–0 Rennes
Home colours	Away colours	Third colours

The 2005–06 season was the 105th season in Stade Rennais FC's history. The club participated in the Ligue 1, the Coupe de France, Coupe de la Ligue and UEFA Cup. The season began on 30 July 2005 and concluded on 13 May 2006.

== Competitions ==
=== Overall record ===
Competition	First match	Last match	Starting round	Final position	Record							
Competition	First match	Last match	Starting round	Final position	Pld	W	D	L	GF	GA	GD	Win %
Ligue 1	30 July 2005	13 May 2006	Matchday 1		38	18	5	15	48	49	−1	47.37
Coupe de France	7 January 2006	20 April 2006	Round of 64	Semi-finals	5	4	0	1	13	9	+4	80.00
Coupe de la Ligue	26 October 2006		Second round	Second round	1	0	0	1	0	1	−1	0.00
UEFA Cup	15 September 2005	14 December 2005	First round	Group stage	6	1	1	4	4	11	−7	16.67
Total					50	23	6	21	65	70	−5	46.00

Source: Competitions

=== Ligue 1 ===
==== League table ====
Pos	Team	Pld	W	D	L	GF	GA	GD	Pts	Qualification or relegation
5	Marseille	38	16	12	10	44	35	+9	60	Qualification to Intertoto Cup third round
6	Auxerre	38	17	8	13	50	39	+11	59	Qualification to Intertoto Cup third round
7	Rennes	38	18	5	15	48	49	−1	59	
8	Nice	38	16	10	12	36	31	+5	58	
9	Paris Saint-Germain	38	13	13	12	44	38	+6	52	Qualification to UEFA Cup first round (Note: Paris Saint-Germain was qualified for the 2006–07 UEFA Cup as winners of the 2005–06 Coupe de France.)

Source: Ligue 1
Rules for classification: 1) points; 2) goal difference; 3) number of goals scored.

==== Results summary ====
Overall								Home						Away					
Pld	W	D	L	GF	GA	GD	Pts	W	D	L	GF	GA	GD	W	D	L	GF	GA	GD
38	18	5	15	48	49	−1	59	11	3	5	34	25	+9	7	2	10	14	24	−10

Source: Ligue 1

==== Results by round ====
Round	1	2	3	4	5	6	7	8	9	10	11	12	13	14	15	16	17	18	19	20	21	22	23	24	25	26	27	28	29	30	31	32	33	34	35	36	37	38
Ground	A	H	A	H	A	H	A	H	A	H	A	A	H	A	H	A	H	A	H	A	H	A	H	A	H	A	H	A	H	H	A	H	A	H	A	H	A	H
Result	L	L	L	W	L	W	W	D	D	L	W	W	W	L	W	L	W	L	L	W	W	L	L	L	L	L	W	W	W	W	W	W	W	W	L	D	D	D
Position	15	19	20	16	19	14	12	13	15	16	13	10	8	10	8	10	8	10	10	10	10	10	11	12	14	15	12	11	9	8	6	5	4	3	4	5	5	7

Source: Ligue 1
A = Away; H = Home; W = Win; D = Draw; L = Loss

==== Matches ====
30 July 2005 1	Lille	1–0	Rennes	Villeneuve d'Ascq
20:00 CEST (UTC+2)	Makoun 38'			Stadium: Stadium Lille Métropole; Attendance: 12,697; Referee: Éric Poulat

7 August 2005 2	Rennes	0–3	Nantes	Rennes
18:00 CEST (UTC+2)				Stadium: Stade de la Route de Lorient; Attendance: 29,345; Referee: Damien Ledentu

13 August 2005 3	Le Mans	4–0	Rennes	Le Mans
20:00 CEST (UTC+2)

20 August 2005 4	Rennes	3–2	Marseille	Rennes
20:00 CEST (UTC+2)				Stadium: Stade de la Route de Lorient; Attendance: 29,490; Referee: Fredy Fautrel

27 August 2005 5	Nancy	6–0	Rennes	Tomblaine
20:00 CEST (UTC+2)

10 September 2005 6	Rennes	3–1	Auxerre	Rennes
20:00 CEST (UTC+2)				Stadium: Stade de la Route de Lorient

18 September 2005 7	Monaco	0–2	Rennes	Monaco
18:00 CEST (UTC+2)				Stadium: Stade Louis II

21 September 2005 8	Rennes	2–2	Bordeaux	Rennes
20:30 CEST (UTC+2)				Stadium: Stade de la Route de Lorient

25 September 2005 9	Lens	0–0	Rennes	Lens
20:45 CEST (UTC+2)

2 October 2005 10	Rennes	1–3	Lyon	Rennes
18:00 CEST (UTC+2)				Stadium: Stade de la Route de Lorient

15 October 2005 11	Strasbourg	0–1	Rennes	Strasbourg
20:00 CEST (UTC+2)

23 October 2005 12	Ajaccio	0–1	Rennes	Ajaccio
18:00 CEST (UTC+2)

29 October 2005 13	Rennes	2–1	Metz	Rennes
CEST (UTC+2)				Stadium: Stade de la Route de Lorient

6 November 2005 14	Troyes	2–1	Rennes	Troyes
CET (UTC+1)

20 November 2005 15	Rennes	4–1	Toulouse	Rennes
CET (UTC+1)				Stadium: Stade de la Route de Lorient

26 November 2005 16	Sochaux	1–0	Rennes	Montbéliard
CET (UTC+1)

4 December 2005 17	Rennes	1–0	Nice	Rennes
CET (UTC+1)				Stadium: Stade de la Route de Lorient

10 December 2005 18	Paris Saint-Germain	2–0	Rennes	Paris
CET (UTC+1)

17 December 2005 19	Rennes	0–1	Saint-Étienne	Rennes
CET (UTC+1)				Stadium: Stade de la Route de Lorient

4 January 2006 20	Nantes	0–2	Rennes	Nantes
CET (UTC+1)

11 January 2006 21	Rennes	1–0	Le Mans	Rennes
CET (UTC+1)				Stadium: Stade de la Route de Lorient

15 January 2006 22	Marseille	1–0	Rennes	Marseille
20:45 CET (UTC+1)	Pagis 65'			Stadium: Stade Vélodrome; Attendance: 45,211; Referee: Bruno Coué

21 January 2006 23	Rennes	0–2	Nancy	Rennes
20:00 CET (UTC+1)				Stadium: Stade de la Route de Lorient; Attendance: 24,142

28 January 2006 24	Auxerre	2–0	Rennes	Auxerre
20:00 CET (UTC+1)				Stadium: Stade de l'Abbé Deschamps; Attendance: 6,606

4 February 2006 25	Rennes	1–3	Monaco	Rennes
20:00 CET (UTC+1)				Stadium: Stade de la Route de Lorient; Attendance: 25,955

11 February 2006 26	Bordeaux	3–1	Rennes	Bordeaux
20:00 CET (UTC+1)				Stadium: Stade Chaban-Delmas; Attendance: 20,133

18 February 2006 27	Rennes	4–1	Lens	Rennes
20:00 CET (UTC+1)				Stadium: Stade de la Route de Lorient; Attendance: 21,501

25 February 2006 28	Lyon	1–4	Rennes	Lyon
20:00 CET (UTC+1)				Stadium: Stade Municipal de Gerland; Attendance: 39,168; Referee: Thierry Auriac

4 March 2006 29	Rennes	2–1	Strasbourg	Rennes
20:00 CET (UTC+1)				Stadium: Stade de la Route de Lorient; Attendance: 23,172

11 March 2006 30	Rennes	3–0	Ajaccio	Rennes
20:00 CET (UTC+1)				Stadium: Stade de la Route de Lorient; Attendance: 22,503

18 March 2006 31	Metz	0–1	Rennes	Metz
20:00 CET (UTC+1)			Gourcuff 27'	Stadium: Stade Saint-Symphorien; Attendance: 16,591; Referee: Hervé Piccirillo

25 March 2006 32	Rennes	2–0	Troyes	Rennes
CET (UTC+1)				Stadium: Stade de la Route de Lorient

2 April 2006 33	Toulouse	0–1	Rennes	Toulouse
18:00 CEST (UTC+2)			Aubey 73' (o.g.)	Stadium: Stadium de Toulouse; Attendance: 16,686; Referee: Patrick Lhermite
Note: Game not played on 1 April 20:00 to avoid concordance with the quarter-final game of Heineken Cup Stade Toulousain-Leinster.

9 April 2006 34	Rennes	2–1	Sochaux	Rennes
20:45 CEST (UTC+2)				Stadium: Stade de la Route de Lorient; Attendance: 23,711; Referee: Fredy Fautrel

16 April 2006 35	Nice	2–1	Rennes	Nice
18:00 CEST (UTC+2)				Stadium: Stade du Ray; Attendance: 11,466; Referee: Thierry Auriac

3 May 2006 36	Rennes	1–1	Paris Saint-Germain	Rennes
20:45 CEST (UTC+2)	Källström 71' (pen.)		Kalou 90+1'	Stadium: Stade de la Route de Lorient; Attendance: 28,425; Referee: Alain Sars

6 May 2006 37	Saint-Étienne	0–0	Rennes	Saint-Étienne
20:00 CEST (UTC+2)				Stadium: Stade Geoffroy Guichard; Attendance: 32,478; Referee: Stéphane Moulin

13 May 2006 38	Rennes	2–2	Lille	Rennes
20:00 CEST (UTC+2)	Frei 36', 65'		Fauvergue 78'; Bodmer 85'	Stadium: Stade de la Route de Lorient; Attendance: 28,788; Referee: Laurent Duhamel

=== Coupe de France ===
7 January 2006 Round of 64	Corte	2–3	Rennes	Ajaccio
17:00 CET (UTC+1)	Da Fonseca 10'; Muller 55'		Bourillon 54'; Sow 84', 85'	Stadium: Stade François Coty; Attendance: 4,000; Referee: Damien Ledentu

31 January 2006 Round of 32	Rennes	1–0	Lens	Rennes
20:30 CET (UTC+1)	Assou-Ekotto 62' (o.g.)			Stadium: Stade de la Route de Lorient; Attendance: 10,307; Referee: Pascal Garibian

21 March 2006 Round of 16	Colmar	1–4	Rennes	Mulhouse
18:15 CET (UTC+1)	Bader 45'		Utaka 3', 66', 69', 72'	Stadium: Stade de l'Ill; Attendance: 10,250; Referee: Jean-Charles Cailleux

12 April 2006 Quarter-finals	Rennes	5–3 (a.e.t.)	Montpellier	Rennes
18:00 CEST (UTC+2)	Briand 2'; Monterrubio 97', 102'; Utaka 104'; Källström 110'		Lafourcade 10', 103', 111'	Stadium: Stade de la Route de Lorient; Attendance: 17,998; Referee: Pascal Garibian

20 April 2006 Semi-finals	Marseille	3–0	Rennes	Marseille
17:00 CEST (UTC+2)	Ribéry 1'; Taiwo 19'; Niang 45'			Stadium: Stade Vélodrome; Attendance: 57,000; Referee: Hervé Piccirillo

=== Coupe de la Ligue ===
26 October 2006 Second round	Montpellier	1–0	Rennes	Montpellier
21:00 CEST (UTC+2)	Lafourcade 87'			Stadium: Stade de la Mosson; Attendance: 4,874; Referee: Tony Chapron

=== UEFA Cup ===
==== First round ====
15 September 2005 First leg	Rennes (France)	3–1	(Spain) Osasuna	Rennes, France
19:00 CEST (UTC+2)				Stadium: Stade de la Route de Lorient

29 September 2005 Second leg	Osasuna (Spain)	0–0 (1–3 agg.)	(France) Rennes	Pamplona, Spain
20:30 CEST (UTC+2)				Stadium: Estadio Reyno de Navarra

==== Group stage ====
Pos	Team	Pld	W	D	L	GF	GA	GD	Pts	Qualification	RAP	SHK	STU	PAOK	REN
1	(Romania) Rapid București	4	3	0	1	5	2	+3	9	Advance to knockout stage	—	—	—	1–0	2–0
2	(Ukraine) Shakhtar Donetsk	4	3	0	1	4	1	+3	9	Advance to knockout stage	0–1	—	—	1–0	—
3	(Germany) VfB Stuttgart	4	3	0	1	6	4	+2	9	Advance to knockout stage	2–1	0–2	—	—	—
4	(Greece) PAOK	4	1	0	3	6	5	+1	3		—	—	1–2	—	5–1
5	(France) Rennes	4	0	0	4	1	10	−9	0		—	0–1	0–2	—	—

== Statistics ==
=== Appearances and goals ===
No.	Pos	Nat	Player	Total		Ligue 1		Coupe de France		Coupe de la Ligue		UEFA Cup	
No.	Pos	Nat	Player	Apps	Goals	Apps	Goals	Apps	Goals	Apps	Goals	Apps	Goals
Goalkeepers
30	GK	(France) FRA	Simon Pouplin	15	0	15	0	0	0	0	0	0	0
1	GK	(Sweden) SWE	Andreas Isaksson	24	0	24	0	0	0	0	0	0	0
Defenders
25	DF	(Ghana) GHA	John Mensah	12	1	12	1	0	0	0	0	0	0
5	DF	(Senegal) SEN	Jacques Faty	23	0	23	0	0	0	0	0	0	0
4	DF	(Brazil) BRA	Adaílton	19	0	19	0	0	0	0	0	0	0
9	DF	(Sweden) SWE	Erik Edman	26	0	26	0	0	0	0	0	0	0
2	DF	(Cameroon) CMR	Jean-Joël Perrier-Doumbé	28	0	28	0	0	0	0	0	0	0
21	DF	(Switzerland) SUI	Alain Rochat	9	0	9	0	0	0	0	0	0	0
27	DF	(France) FRA	Cyril Jeunechamp	13	0	13	0	0	0	0	0	0	0
17	DF	(Cameroon) CMR	Stéphane Mbia	22	0	22	0	0	0	0	0	0	0
3	DF	(Morocco) MAR	Abdeslam Ouaddou	19	1	19	1	0	0	0	0	0	0
6	DF	(France) FRA	Grégory Bourillon	32	0	32	0	0	0	0	0	0	0
Midfielders
14	MF	(France) FRA	Cédric Barbosa	13	0	13	0	0	0	0	0	0	0
24	MF	(France) FRA	Olivier Sorlin	13	0	13	0	0	0	0	0	0	0
22	MF	(France) FRA	Étienne Didot	19	1	19	1	0	0	0	0	0	0
10	MF	(France) FRA	Yoann Gourcuff	36	6	36	6	0	0	0	0	0	0
18	MF	(France) FRA	Olivier Monterrubio	32	5	32	5	0	0	0	0	0	0
8	MF	(Sweden) SWE	Kim Källström	34	8	34	8	0	0	0	0	0	0
Forwards
29	FW	(Senegal) SEN	Moussa Sow	7	0	7	0	0	0	0	0	0	0
28	FW	(Democratic Republic of the Congo) COD	Arnold Mvuemba	16	1	16	1	0	0	0	0	0	0
19	FW	(France) FRA	Jimmy Briand	29	3	29	3	0	0	0	0	0	0
11	FW	(Morocco) MAR	Youssouf Hadji	21	3	21	3	0	0	0	0	0	0
7	FW	(Nigeria) NGA	John Utaka	28	11	28	11	0	0	0	0	0	0
24	FW	(Gabon) GAB	Stéphane N'Guéma	6	0	6	0	0	0	0	0	0	0
23	FW	(Switzerland) SUI	Alexander Frei	23	7	23	7	0	0	0	0	0	0

Last updated: May 2006
Source: Competitions
