= 2005–06 Stade Malherbe Caen season =

Stade Malherbe Caen
2005–06 season
- President: Jean-François Fortin
- Head coach: Patrick Parizon
- Stadium: Stade Michel d'Ornano
- Ligue 2: 4th
- Coupe de France: Round of 64 (disqualified)
- Coupe de la Ligue: Round of 16
- Top goalscorer: League: Stéphane Samson (11); All: Stéphane Samson (13)
- Average home league attendance: 12,866
Home colours	Away colours

The 2005–06 season was Stade Malherbe Caen's 92nd season in existence and the club's first season back in the second division of French football. In addition to the domestic league, Caen participated in this season's editions of the Coupe de France, and the Coupe de la Ligue.

== Competitions ==
=== Overall record ===
Competition	First match	Last match	Starting round	Final position	Record							
Competition	First match	Last match	Starting round	Final position	Pld	W	D	L	GF	GA	GD	Win %
Ligue 2	29 July 2005	12 May 2006	Matchday 1	4th	38	18	12	8	56	35	+21	47.37
Coupe de France	20 November 2005	7 January 2006	Seventh round	Round of 32	3	3	0	0	11	1	+10	100.00
Coupe de la Ligue	22 September 2005	20 December 2005	First round	Round of 16	3	2	0	1	6	2	+4	66.67
Total					44	23	12	9	73	38	+35	52.27

Source: Competitions

=== Ligue 2 ===
==== League table ====
Pos	Team	Pld	W	D	L	GF	GA	GD	Pts	Promotion or Relegation
2	Sedan (P)	38	19	14	5	50	32	+18	71	Promotion to Ligue 1
3	Lorient (P)	38	18	12	8	49	26	+23	66	Promotion to Ligue 1
4	Caen	38	18	12	8	56	35	+21	66	
5	Dijon	38	16	12	10	47	32	+15	60	
6	Bastia	38	16	10	12	47	40	+7	58	

Source: Ligue 2
(P) Promoted

==== Results summary ====
Overall								Home						Away					
Pld	W	D	L	GF	GA	GD	Pts	W	D	L	GF	GA	GD	W	D	L	GF	GA	GD
38	18	12	8	56	35	+21	66	12	5	2	31	15	+16	6	7	6	25	20	+5

Source: Ligue 2

==== Results by round ====
Round	1	2	3	4	5	6	7	8	9	10	11	12	13	14	15	16	17	18	19	20	21	22	23	24	25	26	27	28	29	30	31	32	33	34	35	36	37	38
Ground	A	H	A	H	A	H	A	H	A	H	A	H	A	A	H	A	H	A	H	A	H	A	H	A	H	A	H	A	H	A	H	H	A	H	A	H	A	H
Result	L	W	L	L	L	D	D	D	D	W	W	D	W	D	D	L	W	D	W	D	L	L	W	D	W	D	W	W	D	W	W	W	W	W	W	W	L	W
Position	15	17	19	20	20	20	19	18	20	15	13	13	8	9	8	10	8	8	6	7	8	10	6	9	7	8	8	7	7	6	5	5	5	4	4	4	4	4

Source: Ligue 2
A = Away; H = Home; W = Win; D = Draw; L = Loss

==== Matches ====
29 July 2005 1	Créteil	3–2	Caen	Créteil
--:-- CET (UTC+1)

12 August 2005 3	Reims	2–0	Caen	Reims
--:-- CET (UTC+1)

16 August 2005 4	Caen	0–2	Valenciennes	Caen
--:-- CET (UTC+1)				Stadium: Stade Michel d'Ornano

19 August 2005 5	Laval	1–0	Caen	Laval
--:-- CET (UTC+1)

26 August 2005 6	Caen	0–0	Guingamp	Caen
--:-- CET (UTC+1)				Stadium: Stade Michel d'Ornano

2 September 2005 2	Caen	3–0	Amiens	Caen
--:-- CET (UTC+1)				Stadium: Stade Michel d'Ornano

9 September 2005 7	Sète	1–1	Caen	Sète
--:-- CET (UTC+1)

19 September 2005 8	Caen	1–1	Sedan	Caen
--:-- CET (UTC+1)				Stadium: Stade Michel d'Ornano

30 September 2005 10	Caen	1–0	Lorient	Caen
--:-- CET (UTC+1)				Stadium: Stade Michel d'Ornano

7 October 2005 11	Dijon	0–2	Caen	Dijon
--:-- CET (UTC+1)

14 October 2005 12	Caen	1–1	Grenoble	Caen
--:-- CET (UTC+1)				Stadium: Stade Michel d'Ornano

18 October 2005 9	Istres	0–0	Caen	Istres
--:-- CET (UTC+1)

21 October 2005 13	Clermont	0–3	Caen	Clermont-Ferrand
--:-- CET (UTC+1)

29 October 2005 14	Gueugnon	2–2	Caen	Gueugnon
--:-- CET (UTC+1)

7 November 2005 15	Caen	0–0	Montpellier	Caen
--:-- CET (UTC+1)				Stadium: Stade Michel d'Ornano

11 November 2005 16	Le Havre	2–0	Caen	Le Havre
--:-- CET (UTC+1)

25 November 2005 17	Caen	4–1	Bastia	Caen
--:-- CET (UTC+1)				Stadium: Stade Michel d'Ornano

2 December 2005 18	Châteauroux	1–1	Caen	Châteauroux
--:-- CET (UTC+1)

16 December 2005 19	Caen	3–1	Brest	Caen
--:-- CET (UTC+1)				Stadium: Stade Michel d'Ornano

3 January 2006 20	Amiens	1–1	Caen	Amiens
--:-- CET (UTC+1)

10 January 2006 21	Caen	1–3	Reims	Caen
--:-- CET (UTC+1)				Stadium: Stade Michel d'Ornano

15 January 2006 22	Valenciennes	2–1	Caen	Valenciennes
--:-- CET (UTC+1)

20 January 2006 23	Caen	2–1	Laval	Caen
--:-- CET (UTC+1)				Stadium: Stade Michel d'Ornano

3 February 2006 24	Guingamp	0–0	Caen	Guingamp
--:-- CET (UTC+1)

10 February 2006 25	Caen	1–0	Sète	Caen
--:-- CET (UTC+1)				Stadium: Stade Michel d'Ornano

17 February 2006 26	Sedan	1–1	Caen	Sedan
--:-- CET (UTC+1)

24 February 2006 27	Caen	1–0	Istres	Caen
--:-- CET (UTC+1)				Stadium: Stade Michel d'Ornano

6 March 2006 28	Lorient	1–3	Caen	Lorient
--:-- CET (UTC+1)

10 March 2006 29	Caen	1–1	Dijon	Caen
--:-- CET (UTC+1)				Stadium: Stade Michel d'Ornano

17 March 2006 30	Grenoble	0–2	Caen	Grenoble
--:-- CET (UTC+1)

24 March 2006 31	Caen	2–1	Clermont	Caen
--:-- CET (UTC+1)				Stadium: Stade Michel d'Ornano

31 March 2006 32	Caen	1–0	Gueugnon	Caen
--:-- CET (UTC+1)				Stadium: Stade Michel d'Ornano

7 April 2006 33	Montpellier	1–3	Caen	Montpellier
--:-- CET (UTC+1)

14 April 2006 34	Caen	4–1	Le Havre	Caen
--:-- CET (UTC+1)				Stadium: Stade Michel d'Ornano

21 April 2006 35	Bastia	0–2	Caen	Furiani
--:-- CET (UTC+1)

28 April 2006 36	Caen	2–1	Châteauroux	Caen
--:-- CET (UTC+1)				Stadium: Stade Michel d'Ornano; Attendance: 18,597; Referee: Yves Brizou

5 May 2006 37	Brest	2–1	Caen	Brest
--:-- CET (UTC+1)				Stadium: Stade Francis le Blé; Attendance: 8,290; Referee: Philippe Kalt

12 May 2006 38	Caen	3–1	Créteil	Caen
--:-- CET (UTC+1)				Stadium: Stade Michel d'Ornano; Attendance: 20,376; Referee: Olivier Thual

=== Coupe de France ===
19 November 2005 Seventh round	Tremblay	1–5	Caen	Tremblay
--:-- CEST (UTC+2)

10 December 2005 Eighth round	Caen	2–0	Locminé	Caen
--:-- CEST (UTC+2)				Stadium: Stade Michel d'Ornano

7 January 2006 Round of 64	Longuenesse	0–4	Caen	Longuenesse
--:-- CEST (UTC+2)				Attendance: 3,113; Referee: Ruddy Buquet
Note: Caen disqualified for not following the rules of the competition in having at least seven players who had played one of the last two matches on the referee sheet.

=== Coupe de la Ligue ===
22 September 2005 First round	Caen	5–0	Valenciennes	Caen
--:-- CEST (UTC+2)				Stadium: Stade Michel d'Ornano

26 October 2005 Round of 32	Caen	1–0	Strasbourg	Caen
--:-- CEST (UTC+2)				Stadium: Stade Michel d'Ornano

20 December 2005 Round of 16	Guingamp	2–0	Caen	Guingamp
--:-- CEST (UTC+2)
