= 2011–12 Montpellier HSC season =

Montpellier
2011–12 season
- Chairman: Laurent Nicollin
- Manager: René Girard
- Stadium: Stade de la Mosson
- Ligue 1: 1st
- Coupe de France: Quarter-finals (vs Gazélec Ajaccio)
- Coupe de la Ligue: Round of 16 (vs Lorient)
- Top goalscorer: League: Olivier Giroud (21); All: Olivier Giroud (25)
- Highest home attendance: 27,649 vs Lille (12 May 2012)
- Lowest home attendance: 4,787 vs Lorient (26 October 2011)
- Average home league attendance: 17,492
Home colours	Away colours

The 2011–12 Montpellier HSC season was the 38th professional season of the club since its creation in 1974.

In that, the club was won its first Ligue 1 title, finishing the season with 82 points, three points ahead of runners-up Paris Saint-Germain. On 20 May 2012, in a game marred by stoppages for crowd violence, John Utaka scored a brace to secure a 2–1 victory over Auxerre and won the Ligue 1 title for Montpellier. Olivier Giroud, who finished the season with 21 goals and 9 assists, was the league's top goal scorer. Despite being tied on goals with Paris Saint-Germain Nenê, he was named the league's top scorer by the Ligue de Football Professionnel due to finishing with more goals in open play.

== Players ==
French teams are limited to four players without EU citizenship. Hence, the squad list includes only the principal nationality of each player; several non-European players on the squad have dual citizenship with an EU country. Also, players from the ACP countries—countries in Africa, the Caribbean, and the Pacific that are signatories to the Cotonou Agreement—are not counted against non-EU quotas due to the Kolpak ruling.

=== Current squad ===
As of August 4, 2011.

Note: Flags indicate national team as defined under FIFA eligibility rules; some limited exceptions apply. Players may hold more than one non-FIFA nationality.

No.	Pos.	Nation	Player
1	GK	FRA	Laurent Pionnier
2	DF	FRA	Garry Bocaly
3	DF	FRA	Mapou Yanga-Mbiwa (captain)
4	DF	BRA	Hilton
5	DF	CMR	Henri Bedimo
6	MF	FRA	Joris Marveaux
7	FW	NGR	John Utaka
10	MF	MAR	Younès Belhanda
11	MF	FRA	Grégory Lacombe
12	MF	FRA	Geoffrey Dernis
13	MF	CHI	Marco Estrada
14	MF	FRA	Romain Pitau
15	MF	FRA	Jonathan Tinhan

No.	Pos.	Nation	Player
16	GK	FRA	Geoffrey Jourdren
17	FW	FRA	Olivier Giroud
18	FW	FRA	Karim Aït-Fana
19	FW	SEN	Souleymane Camara
20	MF	FRA	Rémy Cabella
21	DF	MAR	Abdel El Kaoutari
22	MF	FRA	Benjamin Stambouli
23	MF	TUN	Jamel Saihi
25	DF	FRA	Mathieu Deplagne
27	DF	FRA	Cyril Jeunechamp
30	GK	FRA	Jonathan Ligali
40	GK	FRA	Baptiste Valette

=== Out on loan ===
Note: Flags indicate national team as defined under FIFA eligibility rules; some limited exceptions apply. Players may hold more than one non-FIFA nationality.

No.	Pos.	Nation	Player
8	MF	FRA	Guillaume Legras (at Martigues)
24	FW	FRA	Bengali-Fodé Koita (at Lens)
28	MF	FRA	Jonas Martin (at Amiens)
31	DF	FRA	Teddy Mézague (at Martigues)
32	MF	FRA	Adrian Coulomb (at Vannes)

== Transfers ==
=== Summer in ===
Date	Name	Moving from	Fee
9 June 2011	(Cameroon) Henri Bedimo	Lens	Undisclosed
2 August 2011	(Brazil) Vitorino Hilton	Marseille	Free

=== Summer out ===
Date	Name	Moving to	Fee
21 May 2011	(France) Antoine Jouan	Clermont	Free
2 June 2011	(France) Téji Savanier	Arles-Avignon	Free
2 June 2011	(France) Hugo Rodriguez	Arles-Avignon	Free
6 June 2011	(France) Romain Armand	Clermont	Free

=== Winter out ===
Date	Name	Moving to	Fee
30 January 2012	(France) Bengali-Fodé Koita	Lens	Loan

== Competitions ==
=== Ligue 1 ===
==== League table ====
Pos	Team	Pld	W	D	L	GF	GA	GD	Pts	Qualification or relegation
1	Montpellier (C)	38	25	7	6	68	34	+34	82	Qualification to Champions League group stage
2	Paris Saint-Germain	38	23	10	5	75	41	+34	79	Qualification to Champions League group stage
3	Lille	38	21	11	6	72	39	+33	74	Qualification to Champions League play-off round
4	Lyon	38	19	7	12	64	51	+13	64	Qualification to Europa League group stage (Note: Lyon won the 2011–12 Coupe de France and thus qualified for the group stage of the 2012–13 UEFA Europa League. Since they finished 4th, the spot for the Europa League play-off round goes to the fifth-placed team.)
5	Bordeaux	38	16	13	9	53	41	+12	61	Qualification to Europa League play-off round

Source: Ligue 1
Rules for classification: 1) points; 2) goal difference; 3) number of goals scored.
(C) Champions

==== Results summary ====
Overall								Home						Away					
Pld	W	D	L	GF	GA	GD	Pts	W	D	L	GF	GA	GD	W	D	L	GF	GA	GD
38	25	7	6	68	34	+34	82	16	2	1	37	11	+26	9	5	5	31	23	+8

Source: Soccerway

==== Results by round ====
Round	1	2	3	4	5	6	7	8	9	10	11	12	13	14	15	16	17	18	19	20	21	22	23	24	25	26	27	28	29	30	31	32	33	34	35	36	37	38
Ground	H	A	H	A	H	A	A	H	A	H	A	H	A	H	A	H	A	H	A	H	A	H	H	A	H	A	H	A	H	A	H	A	H	A	H	A	H	A
Result	W	W	W	L	W	D	W	L	D	W	W	W	D	W	W	W	L	D	L	W	W	W	W	D	W	D	W	L	W	W	W	L	W	W	D	W	W	W
Position	2	2	1	1	1	2	1	4	2	2	2	2	2	2	1	1	1	1	2	2	2	2	2	2	1	2	2	2	1	1	1	1	1	1	1	1	1	1

Source: Ligue 1
A = Away; H = Home; W = Win; D = Draw; L = Loss
Notes: Match 30 versus Marseille was postponed and later played on 11 April 2012. It should appear between rounds 31 & 32.

==== Matches ====
Win Draw Loss

6 August 2011 1	Montpellier	3–1	Auxerre	Montpellier
21:00	Belhanda 35'; Dernis 75'; Giroud 90'	Report	Traoré 45'	Stadium: Stade de la Mosson; Attendance: 12,198; Referee: Laurent Duhamel

14 August 2011 2	Lille	0–1	Montpellier	Villeneuve-d'Ascq
17:00		Report	Giroud 70'	Stadium: Stadium Nord Lille Métropole; Attendance: 16,304; Referee: Ruddy Buquet

21 August 2011 3	Montpellier	4–0	Rennes	Montpellier
21:00	Belhanda 31' (pen.); Dernis 52'; S. Camara 72', 86'	Report		Stadium: Stade de la Mosson; Attendance: 14,021; Referee: Alexandre Castro

27 August 2011 4	Lyon	2–1	Montpellier	Lyon
17:00	Pjanić 49'; Pied 83'	Report	Belhanda (red card) 82'; Bedimo 90+1'	Stadium: Stade de Gerland; Attendance: 31,634; Referee: Antony Gautier

11 September 2011 5	Montpellier	1–0	Nice	Montpellier
19:00	S. Camara 75'	Report		Stadium: Stade de la Mosson; Attendance: 12,168; Referee: Lionel Jaffredo

17 September 2011 6	Brest	2–2	Montpellier	Brest
19:00	Ben Basat 70'; Gentiletti 88'; Makonda (red card) 90'	Report	Giroud 19', 41'	Stadium: Stade Francis-Le Blé; Attendance: 12,565; Referee: Stéphane Lannoy

21 September 2011 7	Ajaccio	1–3	Montpellier	Ajaccio
19:00	Mostefa 53'	Report	Cabella 3'; Estrada 9'; Utaka 35'; El Kaoutari (yellow card) 53' (yellow-red card) 63'	Stadium: Stade François Coty; Attendance: 5,670; Referee: Hervé Piccirillo

24 September 2011 8	Montpellier	0–3	Paris-Saint-Germain	Montpellier
21:00		Report	Gameiro 39'; Pastore 43', 80'	Stadium: Stade de la Mosson; Attendance: 24,842; Referee: Laurent Duhamel

1 October 2011 9	Bordeaux	2–2	Montpellier	Bordeaux
21:00	Diabaté 18'; Planus (red card) 25'; Ciani 50'	Report	Yanga-Mbiwa (yellow card) 76' (yellow-red card) 80'; Belhanda 88' (pen.); Hilton 90'	Stadium: Stade Chaban-Delmas; Attendance: 17,713; Referee: Clément Turpin

15 October 2011 10	Montpellier	5–3	Dijon	Montpellier
19:00	Estrada 26'; Giroud 50', 57' (pen.), 81'; S. Camara 64'	Report	Corgnet 9', 11'; Guerbert 90'	Stadium: Stade de la Mosson; Attendance: 12,047; Referee: Saïd Ennjimi

22 October 2011 11	Caen	1–3	Montpellier	Caen
19:00	Frau (yellow card) 48' (yellow-red card) 87'; Nivet 82' (pen.)	Report	Yanga-Mbiwa 14'; Marveaux (yellow card) 18' (yellow-red card) 64'; Utaka 20'; Belhanda 79'	Stadium: Stade Michel d'Ornano; Attendance: 14,290; Referee: Sébastien Desiage

29 October 2011 12	Montpellier	2–0	Nancy	Montpellier
19:00	Giroud 62'; S. Camara 74'	Report		Stadium: Stade de la Mosson; Attendance: 11,683; Referee: Wilfred Bien

6 November 2011 13	Saint-Étienne	1–1	Montpellier	Saint-Étienne
17:00	Nicoliță 32'	Report	Marveaux 57'	Stadium: Stade Geoffroy-Guichard; Attendance: 18,788; Referee: Fredy Fautrel

19 November 2011 14	Montpellier	1–0	Marseille	Montpellier
21:00	Diawara 62' (o.g.)	Report		Stadium: Stade de la Mosson; Attendance: 26,241; Referee: Tony Chapron

26 November 2011 15	Sochaux	1–3	Montpellier	Montbéliard
19:00	A. Camara 84'	Report	Giroud 50', 87', 89'	Stadium: Stade Auguste Bonal; Attendance: 11,941; Referee: Stéphane Lannoy

3 December 2011 16	Montpellier	4–0	Lorient	Montpellier
19:00	Dernis 27'; Giroud 47'; Utaka 62'; Cabella 86'	Report		Stadium: Stade de la Mosson; Attendance: 12,866; Referee: Antony Gautier

10 December 2011 17	Valenciennes	1–0	Montpellier	Valenciennes
19:00	Kadir 46'	Report		Stadium: Stade du Hainaut; Attendance: 14,078; Referee: Laurent Duhamel

17 December 2011 18	Montpellier	1–1	Toulouse	Montpellier
19:00	Dernis 7'	Report	M'Bengue 40'; Tabanou (yellow card) 56' (yellow-red card) 87'	Stadium: Stade de la Mosson; Attendance: 16,780; Referee: Ruddy Buquet

21 December 2011 19	Evian	4–2	Montpellier	Annecy
19:00	Barbosa 52'; Khalifa 68'; Cambon 71'; Dja Djédjé 75'	Report	Giroud 47'; Belhanda 54'	Stadium: Parc des Sports; Attendance: 12,336; Referee: Lionel Jaffredo

14 January 2012 20	Montpellier	1–0	Lyon	Montpellier
21:00	Giroud 62'	Report		Stadium: Stade de la Mosson; Attendance: 18,889; Referee: Stéphane Lannoy

28 January 2012 21	Nice	0–1	Montpellier	Nice
19:00		Report	Giroud 90'	Stadium: Stade Municipal du Ray; Attendance: 7,099; Referee: Saïd Ennjimi

4 February 2012 22	Montpellier	1–0	Brest	Montpellier
19:00	Dernis 41'	Report	Sissoko (red card) 90+3'	Stadium: Stade de la Mosson; Attendance: 11,149; Referee: Wilfred Bien

11 February 2012 23	Montpellier	3–0	Ajaccio	Montpellier
19:00	Belhanda 53'; Cabella 64'; Giroud 67'	Report		Stadium: Stade de la Mosson; Attendance: 11,647; Referee: Clément Turpin

19 February 2012 24	Paris-Saint-Germain	2–2	Montpellier	Paris
21:00	Alex 41'; Hoarau 88'	Report	Belhanda 45'; Utaka 82'	Stadium: Parc des Princes; Attendance: 44,398; Referee: Tony Chapron

25 February 2012 25	Montpellier	1–0	Bordeaux	Montpellier
19:00	Utaka 80'	Report		Stadium: Stade de la Mosson; Attendance: 21,284; Referee: Bartolomeu Varela

3 March 2012 26	Dijon	1–1	Montpellier	Dijon
19:00	Kakuta 67'	Report	Tinhan 88'	Stadium: Stade Gaston Gérard; Attendance: 14,016; Referee: Hervé Piccirillo

11 March 2012 27	Montpellier	3–0	Caen	Montpellier
21:00	Aït-Fana 51'; S. Camara 83'; Giroud 90' (pen.)	Report		Stadium: Stade de la Mosson; Attendance: 14,501; Referee: Ruddy Buquet

17 March 2012 28	Nancy	1–0	Montpellier	Tomblaine
19:00	André Luiz 63' (pen.)	Report	Hilton (red card) 43'; Stambouli (red card) 60'	Stadium: Stade Marcel Picot; Attendance: 17,136; Referee: Philippe Kalt

24 March 2012 29	Montpellier	1–0	Saint-Étienne	Montpellier
19:00	Giroud 89'	Report	Mignot (red card) 77'	Stadium: Stade de la Mosson; Attendance: 24,615; Referee: Fredy Fautrel

7 April 2012 31	Montpellier	2–1	Sochaux	Montpellier
19:00	Belhanda 4'; S. Camara 55'	Report	Maïga 28'	Stadium: Stade de la Mosson; Attendance: 18,429; Referee: Bartolomeu Varela

11 April 2012 30	Marseille	1–3	Montpellier	Marseille
18:00	Mbia 33'	Report	Belhanda 7' (pen.), 71'; Giroud 49'	Stadium: Stade Vélodrome; Attendance: 41,519; Referee: Clément Turpin

15 April 2012 32	Lorient	2–1	Montpellier	Lorient
17:00	Bedimo 69' (o.g.); Campbell 77'	Report	Giroud 78'	Stadium: Stade du Moustoir; Attendance: 15,952; Referee: Wilfred Bien

21 April 2012 33	Montpellier	1–0	Valenciennes	Montpellier
19:00	S. Camara 6'	Report		Stadium: Stade de la Mosson; Attendance: 18,731; Referee: Saïd Ennjimi

27 April 2012 34	Toulouse	0–1	Montpellier	Toulouse
19:00		Report	Belhanda 3'	Stadium: Stadium Municipal; Attendance: 21,251; Referee: Tony Chapron

1 May 2012 35	Montpellier	2–2	Evian	Montpellier
21:00	Belhanda 42' (pen.), (red card) 90+5'; Giroud 84'	Report	Kahlenberg 44'; Bérigaud 69'; Mongongu (red card) 90+5'; Khalifa (red card) 90+7'	Stadium: Stade de la Mosson; Attendance: 22,599; Referee: Olivier Thual

7 May 2012 36	Rennes	0–2	Montpellier	Rennes
21:00		Report	S. Camara 26'; Costil 52' (o.g.)	Stadium: Stade de la Route de Lorient; Attendance: 28,172; Referee: Antony Gautier

13 May 2012 37	Montpellier	1–0	Lille	Montpellier
21:00	Aït-Fana 90+3'	Report		Stadium: Stade de la Mosson; Attendance: 27,649; Referee: Fredy Fautrel

20 May 2012 38	Auxerre	1–2	Montpellier	Auxerre
21:00	Kapo 20'	Report	Utaka 32', 76'	Stadium: Stade de l'Abbé Deschamps; Attendance: 16,509; Referee: Saïd Ennjimi

=== Coupe de France ===
8 January 2012 Round of 64	Prix-lès-Mézières	0–4	Montpellier	Charleville-Mézières
20:30			Cabella 17', 40'; Estrada 57'; Giroud 70'	Stadium: Stade du Petit-Bois; Attendance: 3,050; Referee: Hervé Piccirillo

23 January 2012 Round of 32	Tours	0–1	Montpellier	Tours
20:30			Cabella 53'	Stadium: Stade de la Vallée du Cher; Referee: Tony Chapron

8 February 2012 Round of 16	Châteauroux	0–2	Montpellier	Châteauroux
20:00	Fournier (red card) 90+1'		Giroud 38'; Belhanda 90'	Stadium: Stade Gaston Petit; Attendance: 7,713; Referee: Alexandre Castro

21 March 2012 Quarter-finals	Gazélec Ajaccio	1–0	Montpellier	Ajaccio
17:00	Bocognano 75'			Stadium: Stade François Coty; Referee: André Petit

=== Coupe de la Ligue ===
31 August 2011 Third round	Montpellier	2–2 (a.e.t.) (4–3 p)	Amiens	Montpellier
20:00	Utaka 68'; Giroud 76'	Report	Puyo 11'; Gavanon 34' (pen.)	Stadium: Stade de la Mosson; Attendance: 6,179; Referee: Pascal Vileo
	Penalties
	Dernis (penalty missed); Saihi (penalty missed); Marveaux (penalty scored); Giroud (penalty scored); Yanga-Mbiwa (penalty scored); Pitau (penalty scored)		(penalty scored) Bazile; (penalty scored) Puyo; (penalty scored) Djaballah; (penalty missed) Cissé; (penalty missed) Gavanon; (penalty missed) Durimel

26 October 2011 Round of 16	Montpellier	1–2	Lorient	Montpellier
18:45	Bocaly (yellow card) 48' (yellow-red card) 55'; Giroud 65'	Report	Emeghara 14'; Campbell 69'	Stadium: Stade de la Mosson; Attendance: 4,787; Referee: Jean-Charles Cailleux
