= Kroupi =

Kroupi is an Ivorian surname. Notable people with the surname include:

- Éli Kroupi (born 1979), Ivorian football forward
- Eli Junior Kroupi (born 2006), French football forward
