= Moussa Sow =

French footballer (born 1986)

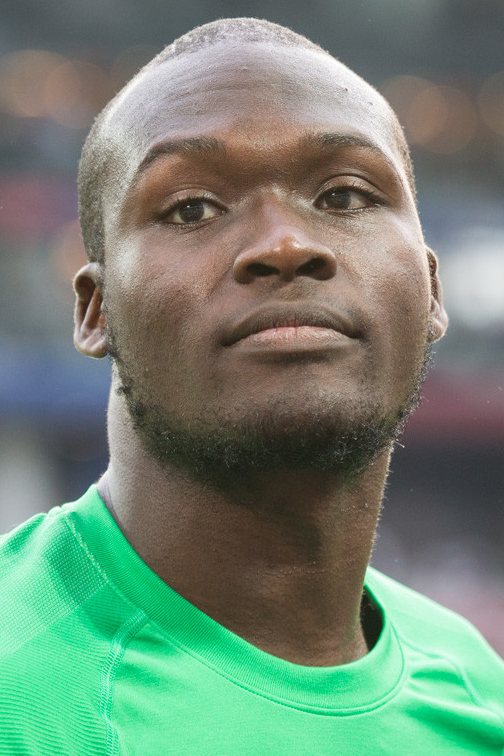
- Sow with Senegal at the 2018 FIFA World Cup

Personal information
- Full name: Moussa Sow
- Date of birth: 19 January 1986 (age 40)
- Place of birth: Mantes-la-Jolie, France
- Height: 1.80 m (5 ft 11 in)
- Position: Forward

Youth career
- 1999–2002: Mantes
- 2002–2003: Amiens
- 2003–2004: Rennes

Senior career*
| Years | Team | Apps | (Gls) |
| 2004–2010 | Rennes | 82 | (12) |
| 2007–2008 | → Sedan (loan) | 30 | (6) |
| 2010–2012 | Lille | 54 | (31) |
| 2012–2015 | Fenerbahçe | 108 | (52) |
| 2015–2018 | Shabab Al Ahli | 32 | (15) |
| 2016–2017 | → Fenerbahçe (loan) | 25 | (12) |
| 2018 | → Bursaspor (loan) | 11 | (4) |
| 2019 | Gazişehir Gaziantep | 15 | (4) |
| 2020–2021 | Ümraniyespor | 13 | (3) |
| Total | | 370 | (139) |

International career
| 2004–2005 | France U19 | 5 | (7) |
| 2009 | France U21 | 2 | (0) |
| 2009–2018 | Senegal | 50 | (18) |
- * Club domestic league appearances and goals

Moussa Sow (born 19 January 1986) is a former professional footballer who played as a forward. Born in France, he represented Senegal at international level, scoring 18 goals in 50 appearances.

He was known for his bicycle kick goals and emotional reactions such as crying when he failed to score, or when the team has lost.

== Club career ==
=== Rennes ===
He started his professional career at Stade Rennais in 2004 as an 18-year-old. In his first couple of seasons, Sow made his mark mostly in cup competitions, scoring a brace for Rennes against Corte on 6 January 2006 in the Coupe de France and one in an away game against Lille in the Coupe de la Ligue.

==== Sedan (loan) ====
He was loaned out to Sedan in 2007, scoring six goals in 30 appearances for the club. Upon his return to Rennes, he was the club's first-choice striker for two seasons before joining Lille on a free transfer In June 2010.

=== Lille ===
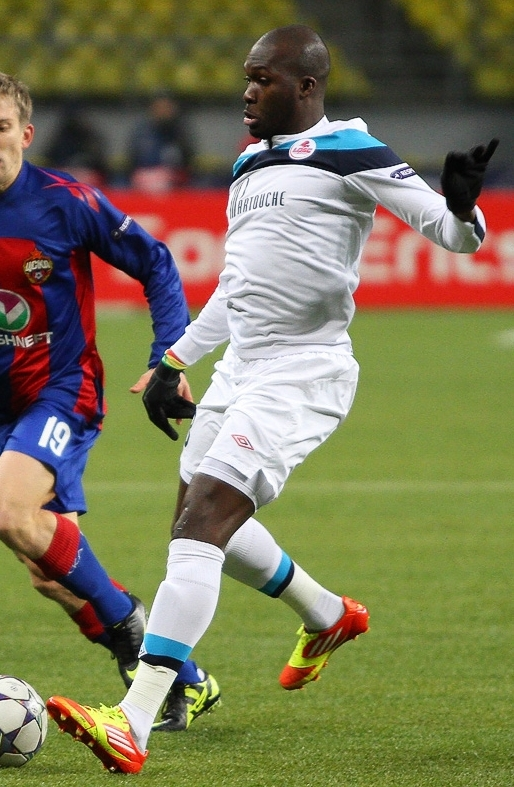
Sow, whilst playing for Lille

After his contract with Rennes came to an end, the 24-year–old forward signed a three-year deal with Lille OSC on 28 June 2010. Sow scored on his debut for Lille in a 1–1 draw away to his former club Rennes. But Moussa Sow did not score again in the league until a 90th-minute goal on 19 September gave Lille all three points in a tough home contest against Auxerre.

Sow scored his first hat-trick for Lille on 13 November 2010, the goals came in a 5–2 away victory to Caen, with both Gervinho and Franck Beria grabbing 90th-minute goals to seal the win. Less than a month later on 5 December 2010, Sow netted another hat-trick this time against Lorient. His goals helped Lille to a 6–3 win and firmly placed his side into contention for the Ligue 1 crown. Lille went into the winter break in sole position of first place, as Sow fired in their only goal in a 1–1 draw with Saint Étienne on 22 December 2010.

Sow scored his 22nd goal of the Ligue 1 campaign in a 2–2 draw with Paris Saint-Germain on 21 May 2011. The result ensured that Lille would secure their first Ligue 1 title since 1954. Sow scored his third hat-trick, on the final day of the season, as Lille tied the knot on their championship season with an emphatic 3–2 victory over former club Rennes. Sow was the top scorer of the 2010–11 season with 25 league goals and also contributed with three assists and been in the Team of the Year.

=== Fenerbahçe ===
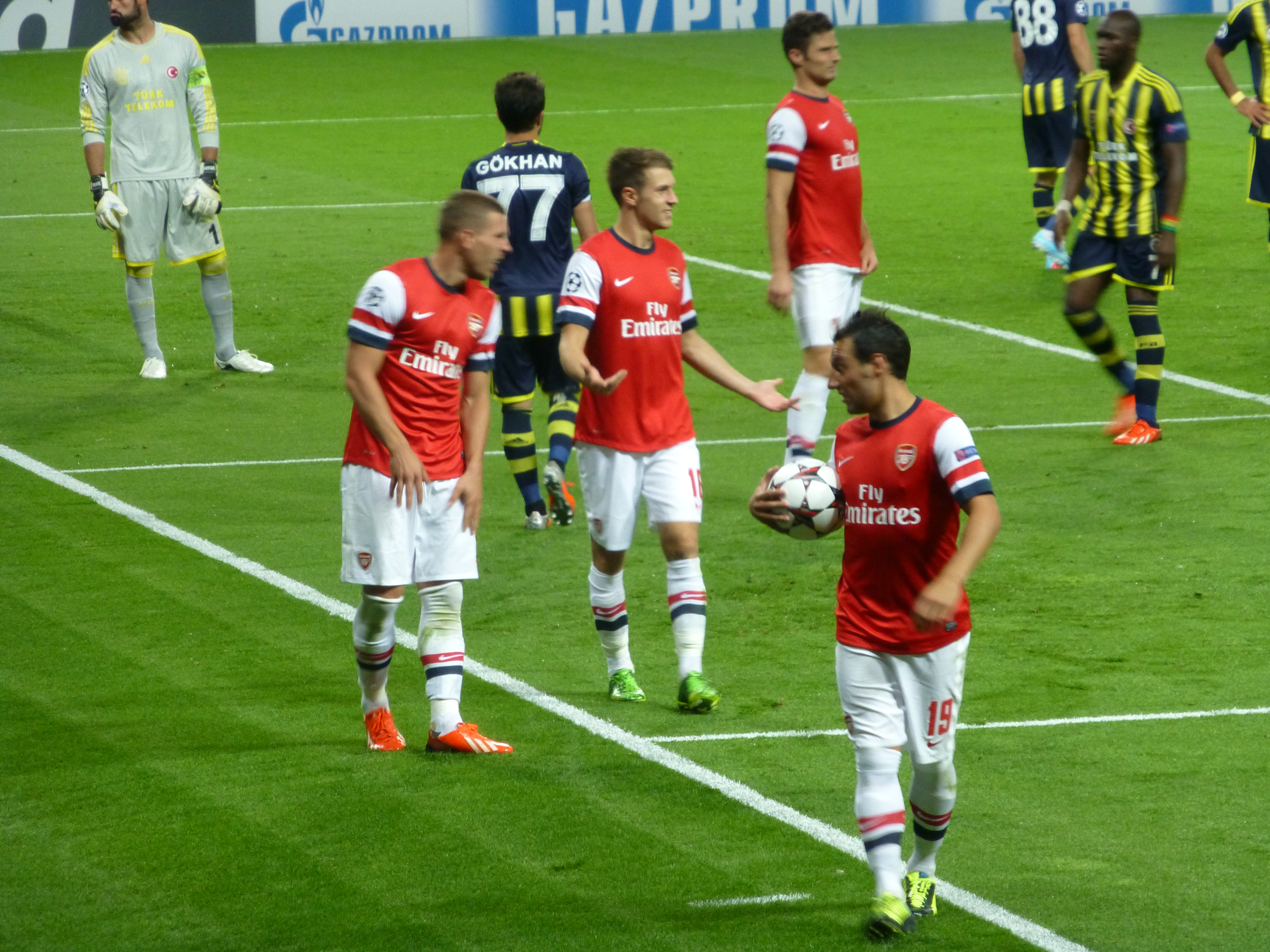
Moussa Sow with Fenerbahçe during a match against Arsenal

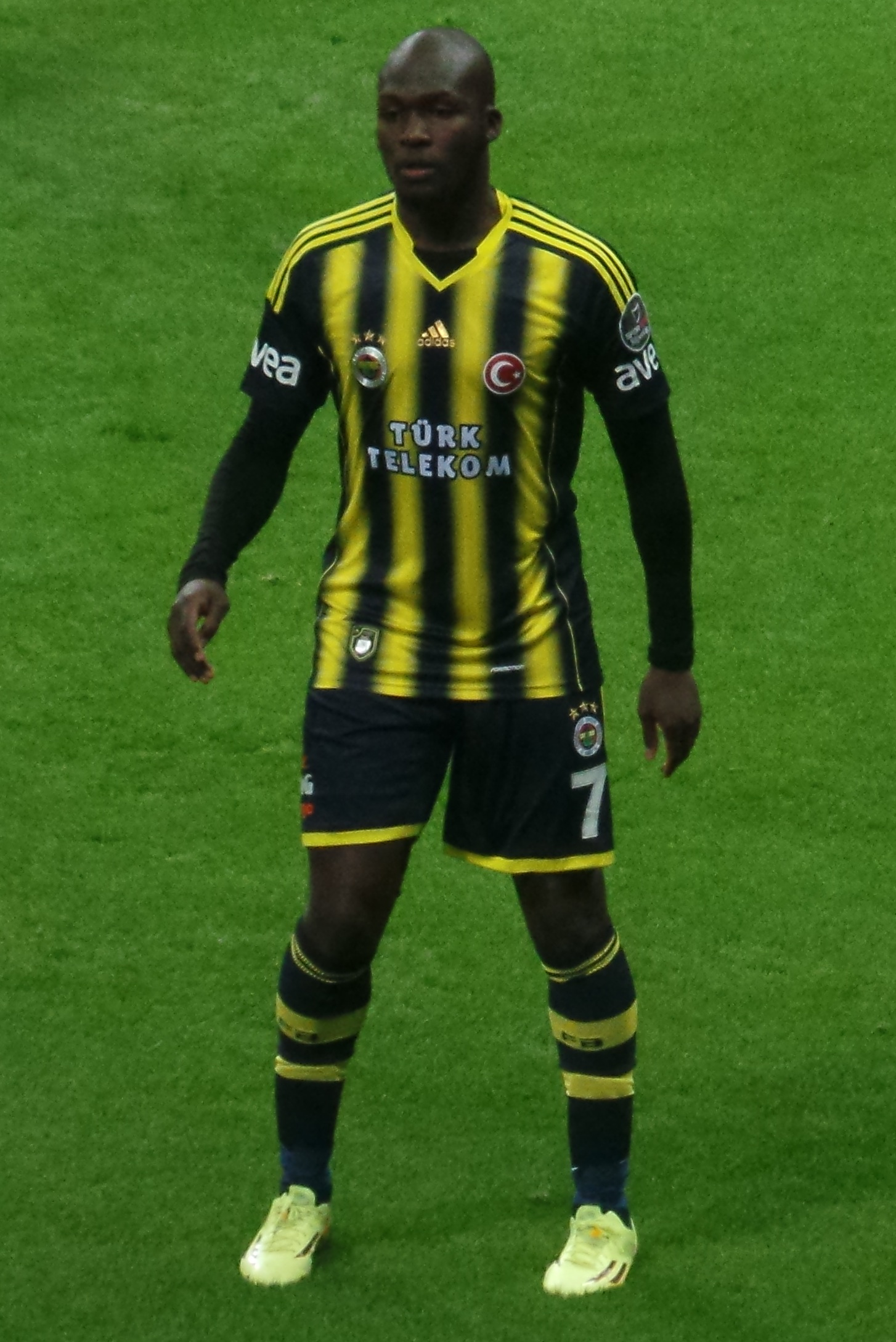
Sow playing for Fenerbahçe in 2014

On 27 January 2012, Fenerbahçe acquired Sow for €10 million. He signed a 4.5-year contract which would have kept him at the club until the end of 2015–16 season. Sow made his debut against local rivals Beşiktaş on 5 February 2012, scoring a goal in the second minute of injury time. On 18 March he scored the first goal of the derby match with a bicycle kick against Galatasaray. He continued his good run of form by scoring a late equaliser against Kayserispor to earn a draw for his team in quarter-finals of the Turkish Cup on 12 April 2012, helping his team to reach the semi-finals through a penalty shoot-out. Sow also scored the second goal for his team against rivals Trabzonspor on 15 April 2012. Over the course of the 2011–12 season Sow played 12 league matches and scored 7 goals. Sow earned his first trophy with Fener in the Turkish Cup final on 16 May as the club ripped apart Bursaspor by a score of 4–0.

In the 2012–13 season Sow scored 13 goals in 22 league matches and three goals in European matches. On 3 March 2013, he scored twice against Beşiktaş followed by a goal each in the following league matches, a 4–1 victory against Bursaspor and a 2–1 win against. Antalyaspor. On 22 May 2013, he scored the solitary goal as Fenerbahçe defeated Trabzonspor to secure the club's second straight 2012–13 Turkish Cup, consolation for falling short to city rivals Galatasaray in the league campaign. On 21 September 2013, Fenerbahçe were victorious in a 4–0 win against Elazığspor while Sow completed his first hat-trick for the club during this match. Sow cried after leaving Fenerbahçe and stated that he will forever be only a Fenerbahçe fan.

=== Al Ahli ===
On 29 August 2015, Al Ahli acquired Sow for €16 million.

==== Return to Fenerbahçe on loan ====
On 31 August 2016, Sow wanted to return to Fenerbahçe and returned to Fenerbahçe on a season long loan deal from Al Ahli. In November 2016, Fenerbahçe began selling shirts with Sow's name and number turned upside as tribute to his repeated times of his amazing bicycle kick goals, the latter of whom he scored a hat-trick against. On 8 December 2016, Sow scored another bicycle kick, this time in the UEFA Europa League in a 1–0 away victory against Feyenoord.

==== Bursaspor (loan) ====
In January 2018, Sow joined Bursaspor on loan from Al Ahli until the end of 2017–18 season.

=== Gazişehir Gaziantep ===
On 28 January 2019, Sow signed for Gazişehir Gaziantep on a one-and-a-half-year contract.

== International career ==
On 5 September 2010, Sow scored his first goal for Senegal in a 4–0 defeat of the Democratic Republic of Congo during qualifying for the 2012 Africa Cup of Nations. He scored three more times in the qualifying phase as well as once in a 2–1 defeat to Equatorial Guinea at the tournament finals.

At the 2015 Africa Cup of Nations, Sow scored Senegal's winning goal as they defeated Ghana 2–1 in the team's opening match.

In May 2018 he was named in Senegal's 23-man squad for the 2018 FIFA World Cup in Russia.

He retired from international football in August 2018.

== Personal life ==
On Instagram, Sow follows only one account; Fenerbahçe.

== Career statistics ==
=== Club ===
Appearances and goals by club, season and competition
| Club | Season | League | | | National cup (Note: Includes Coupe de France, Turkish Cup and UAE President's Cup) | | League cup (Note: Includes Coupe de la Ligue and UAE League Cup) | | Continental | | Other | | Total | |
| Club | Season | Division | Apps | Goals | Apps | Goals | Apps | Goals | Apps | Goals | Apps | Goals | Apps | Goals |
|---|---|---|---|---|---|---|---|---|---|---|---|---|---|---|
| Rennes | 2004–05 | Ligue 1 | 3 | 0 | 1 | 0 | 0 | 0 | 0 | 0 | – | | 4 | 0 |
| Rennes | 2005–06 | Ligue 1 | 7 | 0 | 0 | 0 | 0 | 0 | 2 (Note: Appearances in UEFA Cup) | 0 | – | | 9 | 0 |
| Rennes | 2006–07 | Ligue 1 | 14 | 0 | 1 | 1 | 0 | 0 | 0 | 0 | – | | 15 | 1 |
| Rennes | 2007–08 | Ligue 1 | 2 | 0 | 0 | 0 | 0 | 0 | 0 | 0 | – | | 2 | 0 |
| Rennes | 2008–09 | Ligue 1 | 32 | 9 | 6 | 2 | 2 | 1 | 5 | 1 | – | | 45 | 13 |
| Rennes | 2009–10 | Ligue 1 | 24 | 3 | 1 | 2 | 1 | 0 | – | | – | | 26 | 5 |
| Rennes | Total | | 82 | 12 | 9 | 5 | 3 | 1 | 7 | 1 | – | | 101 | 19 |
| Sedan (loan) | 2007–08 | Ligue 2 | 30 | 6 | 0 | 0 | 0 | 0 | – | | – | | 30 | 6 |
| Lille | 2010–11 | Ligue 1 | 36 | 25 | 5 | 0 | 2 | 0 | 8 (Note: Appearances in UEFA Europa League) | 1 | – | | 51 | 26 |
| Lille | 2011–12 | Ligue 1 | 18 | 6 | 0 | 0 | 0 | 0 | 6 (Note: Appearances in UEFA Champions League) | 3 | 1 (Note: Appearance in Trophée des Champions) | 1 | 25 | 10 |
| Lille | Total | | 54 | 31 | 5 | 0 | 2 | 0 | 14 | 4 | 1 | 1 | 76 | 36 |
| Fenerbahçe | 2011–12 | Süper Lig | 12 | 7 | 2 | 1 | – | | – | | – | | 14 | 8 |
| Fenerbahçe | 2012–13 | Süper Lig | 31 | 15 | 6 | 1 | – | | 16 (Note: Four appearances and two goals in UEFA Champions League, twelve appearances and one goal in UEFA Europa League) | 3 | 1 (Note: Appearance in Turkish Super Cup) | 0 | 54 | 19 |
| Fenerbahçe | 2013–14 | Süper Lig | 30 | 15 | 0 | 0 | – | | 4 | 1 | 1 | 0 | 35 | 16 |
| Fenerbahçe | 2014–15 | Süper Lig | 33 | 14 | 6 | 2 | – | | 0 | 0 | 1 | 0 | 40 | 16 |
| Fenerbahçe | 2015–16 | Süper Lig | 2 | 1 | 0 | 0 | – | | 3 (Note: Two appearances in UEFA Champions League, one appearance in UEFA Europa League) | 0 | – | | 5 | 1 |
| Fenerbahçe | Total | | 108 | 52 | 14 | 4 | – | | 23 | 4 | 3 | 0 | 148 | 60 |
| Al-Ahli | 2015–16 | UAE Pro League | 24 | 13 | 0 | 0 | 6 | 3 | 0 | 0 | – | | 30 | 16 |
| Fenerbahçe (loan) | 2016–17 | Süper Lig | 24 | 12 | 5 | 1 | – | | 7 | 2 | – | | 36 | 15 |
| Al-Ahli | 2017–18 | UAE Pro League | 8 | 1 | 0 | 0 | 0 | 0 | 0 | 0 | – | | 8 | 1 |
| Bursaspor (loan) | 2017–18 | Süper Lig | 11 | 4 | 1 | 0 | – | | – | | – | | 12 | 4 |
| Gazişehir Gaziantep | 2018–19 | Süper Lig | 15 | 4 | 0 | 0 | – | | – | | – | | 15 | 4 |
| Ümraniyespor | 2020–21 | TFF First League | 13 | 3 | 1 | 0 | – | | – | | – | | 14 | 3 |
| Career total | | | 369 | 137 | 35 | 10 | 11 | 4 | 51 | 11 | 4 | 1 | 470 | 163 |

=== International ===
Appearances and goals by national team and year
| National team | Year | Apps | Goals |
|---|---|---|---|
| Senegal | 2009 | 3 | 0 |
| Senegal | 2010 | 5 | 2 |
| Senegal | 2011 | 5 | 3 |
| Senegal | 2012 | 6 | 1 |
| Senegal | 2013 | 8 | 3 |
| Senegal | 2014 | 5 | 1 |
| Senegal | 2015 | 5 | 2 |
| Senegal | 2016 | 1 | 1 |
| Senegal | 2017 | 10 | 5 |
| Senegal | 2018 | 2 | 0 |
| Total | | 50 | 18 |

Scores and results list Senegal's goal tally first, score column indicates score after each Sow goal. (includes two unofficial goals)

List of international goals scored by Moussa Sow
| No. | Date | Venue | Opponent | Score | Result | Competition |
|---|---|---|---|---|---|---|
| 1 | 5 September 2010 | Stade des Martyrs, Kinshasa, Democratic Republic of the Congo | DR Congo | 1–0 | 4–0 | 2012 Africa Cup of Nations qualification |
| 2 | 9 October 2010 | Stade Léopold Sédar Senghor, Dakar, Senegal | Mauritius | 4–0 | 7–0 | 2012 Africa Cup of Nations qualification |
| 3 | 9 February 2011 | Stade Léopold Sédar Senghor, Dakar, Senegal | Guinea | 2–0 | 3–0 | Friendly |
| 4 | 3 September 2011 | Stade Léopold Sédar Senghor, Dakar, Senegal | DR Congo | 1–0 | 2–0 | 2012 Africa Cup of Nations qualification |
| 5 | 3 September 2011 | Stade Léopold Sédar Senghor, Dakar, Senegal | DR Congo | 2–0 | 2–0 | 2012 Africa Cup of Nations qualification |
| 6 | 25 January 2012 | Estadio de Bata, Bata, Equatorial Guinea | Equatorial Guinea | 1–1 | 2–1 | 2012 Africa Cup of Nations |
| 7 | 5 February 2013 | Stade Municipal Saint-Leu-la-Forêt, Paris, France | Guinea | 1–0 | 1–1 | Friendly |
| 8 | 23 March 2013 | Stade du 28 Septembre, Conakry, Guinea | Angola | 1–0 | 1–1 | 2014 FIFA World Cup qualification |
| 9 | 16 November 2013 | Stade Mohamed V, Casablanca, Morocco | Ivory Coast | 1–0 | 1–1 | 2014 FIFA World Cup qualification |
| 10 | 19 November 2014 | Stade Léopold Sédar Senghor, Dakar, Senegal | Botswana | 3–0 | 3–0 | 2015 Africa Cup of Nations qualification |
| 11 | 9 January 2015 | Stade Mohamed V, Casablanca, Morocco | Gabon | 1–0 | 1–0 | Friendly |
| 12 | 19 January 2015 | Estadio de Mongomo, Mongomo, Equatorial Guinea | Ghana | 2–1 | 2–1 | 2015 Africa Cup of Nations |
| 13 | 8 October 2016 | Stade Léopold Sédar Senghor, Dakar, Senegal | Cape Verde | 2–0 | 2–0 | 2018 FIFA World Cup qualification |
| 14 | 8 January 2017 | Stade Municipal de Kintélé, Brazzaville, Republic of Congo | Libya | 1–0 | 2–1 | Friendly |
| 15 | 23 January 2017 | Stade de Franceville, Franceville, Gabon | Algeria | 2–2 | 2–2 | 2017 Africa Cup of Nations |
| 16 | 23 March 2017 | The Hive Stadium, London, England | Nigeria | 1–0 | 1–1 | Friendly |
| 17 | 10 June 2017 | Stade Léopold Sédar Senghor, Dakar, Senegal | Equatorial Guinea | 1–0 | 3–0 | 2019 Africa Cup of Nations qualification |
| 18 | 10 June 2017 | Stade Léopold Sédar Senghor, Dakar, Senegal | Equatorial Guinea | 2–0 | 3–0 | 2019 Africa Cup of Nations qualification |

== Honours ==
Rennes

- UEFA Intertoto Cup: 2008
- Coupe de France runner-up: 2008–09

Lille

- Ligue 1: 2010–11
- Coupe de France: 2010–11
- Trophée des Champions runner-up: 2011

Fenerbahce

- Süper Lig: 2013–14
- Turkish Cup: 2012–13
- Turkish Super Cup: 2014

Al-Ahli Dubai

- UAE Pro League: 2015–16

France U19

- UEFA European Under-19 Football Championship: 2005

Individual

- CAF Team of the Year: 2011
- Ligue 1 top goalscorer: 2010–11
- Ligue 1 Team of the Season: 2010–11
