= Éli Kroupi =

Ivorian footballer (born 1979)

Personal information
- Full name: Zahi Verges Napoles Kroupi
- Date of birth: 18 October 1979 (age 47)
- Place of birth: Kadrokpa, Sassandra, Ivory Coast
- Height: 1.75 m (5 ft 9 in)
- Position: Forward

Youth career
- 1997–1998: Rennes

Senior career*
Years	Team	Apps	(Gls)
1997–1998	Rennes	2	(0)
1998–2000	Valence	22	(3)
2000–2004	Lorient	93	(29)
2004	Angers	4	(0)
2004–2006	Nancy	43	(23)
2007	→ Al-Wahda (loan)	16	(4)
2007–2008	Arezzo	6	(2)
2008	Levadiakos	8	(0)
2008–2009	Nîmes	13	(1)
2010	Al Urooba		
2010–2011	GSI Pontivy	2	(0)
2011–2012	Ploemeur		
Total		271	(88)

International career
2001–2005	Ivory Coast	2	(0)
- * Club domestic league appearances and goals

Zahi Verges Napoles "Éli" Kroupi (born 18 October 1979), also known as Elie Kroupi, is an Ivorian former professional footballer who played as a forward. He played for, among others, Rennes, Lorient, Angers, Nancy and Nîmes in France, Greek club Levadiakos as well as United Arab Emirates sides Al-Wahda and Al Urooba.

== Club career ==
Kroupi was born in Kadrokpa, Sassandra, Ivory Coast.

Whilst at Lorient, Kroupi played in the 2002 Coupe de France Final, in which they beat Bastia.

He spent the 2006–07 season on loan at United Arab Emirates side Al-Wahda. In July 2007, it was announced that Kroupi would not return to Nancy, after the club decided to cancel his contract. Then, Kroupi signed with Greek club Levadiakos in 2008. After 8 appearances for Levadiakos, he returned to France. This time, he signed with Nîmes in Ligue 2. On 18 March 2010, Al Urooba signed the Ivorian striker from Nîmes.

== International career ==
Kroupi debuted for Ivory Coast on 17 June 2001 during the 2–2 draw in the 2002 African Cup of Nations qualification. He also played on 2 August 2005 during the 2–2 friendly draw against DR Congo.

== Playing style ==
Kroupi is known for his speed, his ability to shoot accurately with both feet, and his supreme scoring ability. He was also one of the top scorers in Ligue 1 during the 2005–06 season.

== Personal life ==
Kroupi holds Ivorian and French nationalities. His cousin is former New England Revolution player Arsène Oka. His son Eli Junior Kroupi is a professional footballer who also played for Lorient before moving to Premier League side Bournemouth, and also plays for the France national team.

== Career statistics ==
=== International ===
Appearances and goals by national team and year
National team	Year	Apps	Goals
Ivory Coast	2001	1	0
Ivory Coast	2002	0	0
Ivory Coast	2003	0	0
Ivory Coast	2004	0	0
Ivory Coast	2005	1	0
Total		2	0

== Honours ==
Lorient

- Coupe de France: 2001–02

Nancy

- Coupe de la Ligue: 2005–06
