= 2005–06 Ligue 1 =

68th season of top-tier French football

Ligue 1
- Season: 2005–06
- Dates: 29 July 2005 – 13 May 2006
- Champions: Lyon (5th Title)
- Relegated: Ajaccio; Strasbourg; Metz
- Champions League: Lyon; Bordeaux; Lille
- UEFA Cup: Lens; Paris Saint-Germain; Nancy
- Matches: 380
- Goals: 811 (2.13 per match)
- Top goalscorer: Pauleta (21 goals)

Olympique Lyonnais won Ligue 1 season 2005–06 of the French Association Football League with 84 points.

== Participating teams ==
Location of teams in 2005–06 Ligue 1
- Ajaccio
- Auxerre
- Bordeaux
- Le Mans
- Lens
- Lille
- Lyon
- Marseille
- Metz
- Monaco
- Nancy
- Nantes
- Nice
- Paris Saint-Germain
- Rennes
- Saint-Étienne
- Sochaux
- Strasbourg
- Toulouse
- Troyes

=== Personnel and kits ===
Team	Manager	Kit manufacturer	Shirt sponsors (front)	Shirt sponsors (back)	Shirt sponsors (sleeve)	Shorts sponsors
Ajaccio	(France) José Pasqualetti	Legea	Géant Casino, Collectivité Territoriale de Corse/Conseil Général de la Corse du Sud	Conseil Général de la Corse du Sud	Collectivité Territoriale de Corse	None
Auxerre	(France) Jacques Santini	Uhlsport	PlayStation, PlayStation Portable	None	None	None
Bordeaux	(Brazil) Ricardo Gomes	Puma	Motorola/Motorola SLVR L7	Cdiscount	EUROP-LOT	Cdiscount
Le Mans	(France) Frédéric Hantz	Kappa	Le Gaulois (H)/Fermiers de Loué (A), NTN	muc72.fr/NTN	None	Quick
Lens	(France) Francis Gillot	Nike	Orange	Orange	None	None
Lille	(France) Claude Puel	Kipsta	Partouche Casino	Partouche Casino	None	None
Lyon	(France) Gérard Houllier	Umbro	Renault Trucks (H)/LG Mobile (A), Apicil, Renault Trucks	Renault Trucks	Fertiligène	ISS
Marseille	(France) Jean Fernandez	Adidas	Neuf	VK Mobile	Internity	Quick
Metz	(France) Joël Müller	Kappa	Arcelor (H)/Sollac (A), Moselle	None	Cora	BigBen Interactive
Monaco	(Italy) Francesco Guidolin	Puma	Fedcom, HSBC	Superfund	HSBC	None
Nancy	(Uruguay) Pablo Correa	Baliston	Odalys Vacances, Geodis Calberson, Vittel, Grand Nancy	None	Regina	TUI
Nantes	(France) Serge Le Dizet	Airness	Synergie Interim	Synergie Interim	None	None
Nice	(France) Frédéric Antonetti	Puma	Rica Lewis (H)/Gorenje (A), RMC	Gorenje (H)/Rica Lewis (A)	Pizzorno Environnement	Pizzorno Environnement
Paris Saint-Germain	(France) Guy Lacombe	Nike	Thomson	None	PSG.fr	None
Rennes	(Romania) László Bölöni	Airness	Airness, Samsic Propreté, rennes.fr	Fiat Utilitaires	Association ELA	staderennais.com
Saint-Étienne	(France) Élie Baup	Adidas	Konica Minolta, Conseil général de la Loire en Rhône-Alpes	Vocalcom	None	Loire
Sochaux	(France) Dominique Bijotat	Lotto	Esso, Franche-Comté	Loxam	Megnin Bernard	Adia Job Store
Strasbourg	(France) Jacky Duguépéroux	Adidas	Steelcase (H)/Afflelou (A and in UEFA matches), Strasbourg	Afflelou (H)	None	None
Toulouse	(France) Erick Mombaerts	Lotto	Nicopatch, Monné-Decroix, Eaux d'Alet	Creditec	None	ISS
Troyes	(France) Jean-Marc Furlan	Baliston	Baguépi (H)/Groupe Nasuba (A), Samro, CLCT Studio	Groupe Nasuba (H)/Baguépi (A)	None	LCR

== League table ==
Pos	Team	Pld	W	D	L	GF	GA	GD	Pts	Qualification or relegation
1	Lyon (C)	38	25	9	4	73	31	+42	84	Qualification to Champions League group stage
2	Bordeaux	38	18	15	5	43	25	+18	69	Qualification to Champions League group stage
3	Lille	38	16	14	8	56	31	+25	62	Qualification to Champions League third qualifying round
4	Lens	38	14	18	6	48	34	+14	60	Qualification to UEFA Cup first round
5	Marseille	38	16	12	10	44	35	+9	60	Qualification to Intertoto Cup third round
6	Auxerre	38	17	8	13	50	39	+11	59	Qualification to Intertoto Cup third round
7	Rennes	38	18	5	15	48	49	−1	59	
8	Nice	38	16	10	12	36	31	+5	58	
9	Paris Saint-Germain	38	13	13	12	44	38	+6	52	Qualification to UEFA Cup first round (Note: Paris Saint-Germain was qualified for the 2006–07 UEFA Cup as winners of the 2005–06 Coupe de France.)
10	Monaco	38	13	13	12	42	36	+6	52	
11	Le Mans	38	13	13	12	33	36	−3	52	
12	Nancy	38	12	12	14	35	37	−2	48	Qualification to UEFA Cup first round (Note: Nancy was qualified for the 2006–07 UEFA Cup as winners of the 2005–06 Coupe de la Ligue.)
13	Saint-Étienne	38	11	14	13	29	39	−10	47	
14	Nantes	38	11	12	15	37	41	−4	45	
15	Sochaux	38	11	11	16	34	47	−13	44	
16	Toulouse	38	10	11	17	36	47	−11	41	
17	Troyes	38	9	12	17	37	47	−10	39	
18	Ajaccio (R)	38	8	9	21	27	53	−26	33	Relegation to Ligue 2
19	Strasbourg (R)	38	5	14	19	33	56	−23	29	Relegation to Ligue 2
20	Metz (R)	38	6	11	21	26	59	−33	29	Relegation to Ligue 2

Source: Ligue 1
Rules for classification: 1) points; 2) goal difference; 3) number of goals scored.
(C) Champions; (R) Relegated

== Results ==
Home \ Away	ACA	AUX	BOR	MFC	RCL	LIL	OL	OM	MET	ASM	NAL	NAN	NIC	PSG	REN	STE	SOC	STR	TFC	TRO
Ajaccio		1–0	0–2	0–0	0–0	3–3	1–3	3–1	0–1	1–0	1–0	0–2	0–3	1–1	0–1	3–1	0–1	0–0	1–0	0–1
Auxerre	2–0		1–0	0–0	1–0	3–2	0–2	1–2	1–1	2–1	0–1	4–0	2–0	2–0	2–0	0–0	3–0	4–0	2–0	3–0
Bordeaux	1–0	1–0		2–2	1–0	1–0	1–1	1–1	3–3	1–0	1–0	0–0	1–0	0–2	2–0	0–0	1–1	2–1	2–0	2–0
Le Mans	1–0	0–2	1–0		0–0	1–1	1–2	3–0	2–0	0–0	0–0	0–0	2–0	0–0	4–0	0–1	2–1	2–0	1–1	1–0
Lens	1–0	7–0	1–1	2–0		4–2	1–1	2–0	0–0	1–1	1–2	3–1	2–2	1–1	0–0	2–1	2–1	2–1	1–0	1–0
Lille	2–0	1–1	3–2	4–0	0–0		4–0	0–0	3–1	0–1	1–0	2–0	4–0	0–0	1–0	2–0	3–0	2–0	0–0	1–2
Lyon	3–2	1–1	0–0	8–1	1–1	1–3		2–1	4–0	2–1	1–0	3–1	2–1	2–0	1–4	4–0	1–0	1–0	1–1	2–1
Marseille	1–1	1–0	0–2	1–1	1–1	1–1	1–1		3–1	2–1	6–0	2–1	1–0	1–0	1–0	2–0	0–0	2–2	0–0	2–1
Metz	2–0	1–2	0–1	0–0	0–1	0–2	0–4	1–0		2–1	0–0	1–4	1–0	1–0	0–1	0–1	0–1	0–0	2–2	2–4
Monaco	3–0	0–2	0–1	2–0	0–0	0–1	2–1	1–0	3–0		2–2	1–1	0–0	1–1	0–2	1–0	4–1	1–1	1–0	1–1
Nancy	0–0	1–3	0–0	1–0	1–2	0–0	0–2	1–1	1–1	0–1		0–0	0–0	1–1	6–0	2–0	0–3	1–2	2–0	2–1
Nantes	0–2	3–2	0–1	1–0	2–0	1–1	0–1	1–3	0–0	0–0	3–0		0–0	0–0	0–2	1–1	3–1	4–3	2–0	1–1
Nice	1–0	1–0	0–1	1–0	0–0	2–0	1–1	0–1	2–1	2–0	1–0	1–1		1–0	2–1	0–1	1–2	3–1	2–1	1–1
Paris SG	2–4	4–1	3–1	0–1	3–4	2–1	0–1	0–0	4–1	0–0	1–0	2–0	1–2		2–0	2–2	3–1	1–0	2–0	2–1
Rennes	3–0	3–1	2–2	1–0	4–1	2–2	1–3	3–2	2–1	1–3	0–2	0–3	1–0	1–1		0–1	2–1	2–1	4–1	2–0
Saint-Étienne	0–0	1–1	1–1	3–0	2–0	0–2	0–0	2–1	2–0	1–1	0–2	1–0	0–1	3–0	0–0		0–0	0–2	1–3	1–1
Sochaux	3–1	1–0	0–3	0–0	1–1	0–0	0–4	0–1	1–1	2–1	0–2	1–0	1–1	0–1	1–0	4–0		1–1	0–1	1–1
Strasbourg	2–2	0–0	0–0	1–2	1–1	2–2	0–4	0–1	2–1	1–2	1–3	0–1	0–0	1–1	0–1	0–1	0–0		2–4	2–0
Toulouse	3–0	2–0	1–1	0–2	1–1	0–0	0–1	1–0	2–0	3–3	1–1	1–0	0–2	1–0	0–1	1–1	1–2	1–2		2–1
Troyes	3–0	1–1	1–1	1–3	1–1	1–0	0–1	0–1	0–0	1–2	0–1	1–0	1–2	1–1	2–1	0–0	2–1	1–1	3–1	

Source: Ligue 1
Legend: Blue = home team win; Yellow = draw; Red = away team win.

== Top goalscorers ==
Rank	Player	Club	Goals
1	(Portugal) Pauleta	Paris Saint-Germain	21
2	(Brazil) Fred	Lyon	14
2	(Nigeria) Peter Odemwingie	Lille	14
4	(Gabon) Daniel Cousin	Lens	13
5	(Belgium) Luigi Pieroni	Auxerre	12
5	(France) Sylvain Wiltord	Lyon	12
7	(Nigeria) John Utaka	Rennes	11
8	(France) Péguy Luyindula	Auxerre	10
8	(Senegal) Mamadou Niang	Marseille	10
8	(France) Mickaël Pagis	Marseille (6); Strasbourg (4)	10
8	(Mali) Mamadou Diallo	Nantes	10
8	(Brazil) Ilan	Sochaux	10
8	(Uruguay) Javier Chevantón	Monaco	10
8	(France) Daniel Moreira	Toulouse	10

== Awards ==
=== Player of the Month ===
Month	Player
August	(France) Jérôme Leroy (Lens)
September	(France) Grégory Coupet (Lyon)
October	(France) Franck Ribéry (Marseille)
November	(France) Franck Ribéry (Marseille)
December	(Senegal) Mamadou Niang (Marseille)
January	(Japan) Daisuke Matsui (Le Mans)
February	(Nigeria) John Utaka (Rennes)
March	(France) Yoann Gourcuff (Rennes)
April	(France) Franck Ribéry (Marseille)

=== Annual ===
Award	Winner	Club	Ref.
Player of the Season	(Brazil) Juninho	Olympique Lyonnais	
Young Player of the Season	(France) Franck Ribéry	Olympique de Marseille	
Goalkeeper of the Season	(France) Grégory Coupet	Olympique Lyonnais	
Manager of the Season	(France) Claude Puel	Lille OSC	

Team of the Year
Goalkeeper	(France) Grégory Coupet (Lyon)			
Defenders	(Tunisia) David Jemmali (Bordeaux)	(Brazil) Cris (Lyon)	(Colombia) Mario Yepes (Paris Saint-Germain)	(France) Éric Abidal (Lyon)
Midfielders	(Mali) Mahamadou Diarra (Lyon)	(Brazil) Juninho (Lyon)	(France) Franck Ribéry (Marseille)	(France) Florent Malouda (Lyon)
Forwards	(France) Sylvain Wiltord (Lyon)		(Portugal) Pauleta (Paris Saint-Germain)	

== Attendances ==
No.	Club	Average attendance	Change	Highest
1	Olympique de Marseille	49,625	-6.4%	57,609
2	Paris Saint-Germain FC	40,486	14.4%	43,906
3	Olympique lyonnais	38,465	2.5%	40,426
4	RC Lens	34,184	-2.2%	40,591
5	AS Saint-Étienne	29,627	-0.8%	43,921
6	FC Nantes	29,450	-4.2%	37,260
7	Stade rennais	25,002	7.5%	29,490
8	Girondins de Bordeaux	24,247	3.3%	32,765
9	RC Strasbourg	18,984	8.8%	26,022
10	Toulouse FC	18,883	-19.0%	28,524
11	AS Nancy	17,164	42.1%	20,064
12	FC Metz	16,040	-11.9%	22,689
13	FC Sochaux	14,257	-9.1%	18,770
14	ESTAC	13,803	57.5%	19,825
15	LOSC	13,221	-0.8%	17,274
16	Le Mans FC	11,438	52.7%	16,531
17	AS Monaco	11,183	-5.0%	17,596
18	OGC Nice	10,903	-5.4%	14,283
19	AJ auxerroise	10,669	-6.2%	19,980
20	AC Ajaccio	3,415	12.1%	4,783
