= Anthony Gauvin =

French footballer (born 1973)

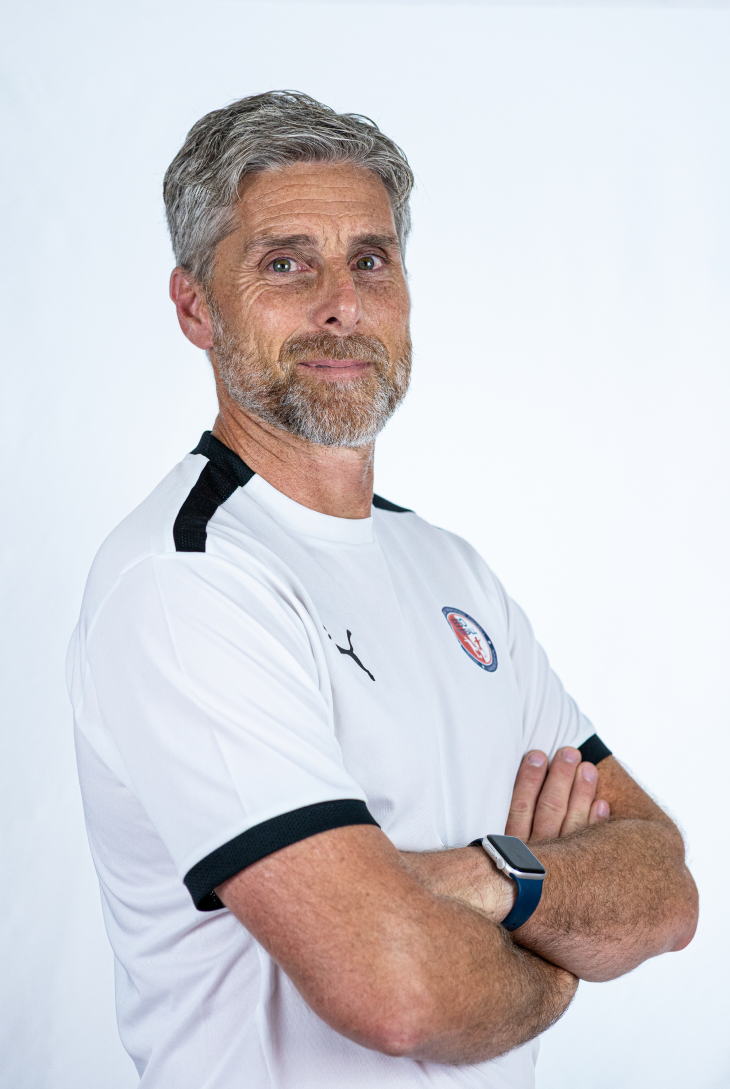

Personal information
- Date of birth: 15 November 1973 (age 52)
- Place of birth: Niort, France
- Height: 1.78 m (5 ft 10 in)
- Position: Defender

Senior career*
Years	Team	Apps	(Gls)
1991–1997	Chamois Niortais	156	(3)
1997–1998	Saint-Étienne	42	(3)
1998–1999	Nice	17	(0)
1999–2004	Lorient	139	(18)
2004–2007	Le Havre	84	(7)
2007–2008	Brest	9	(0)
2008–2010	Fontenay-le-Comte	46	(3)

Managerial career
- 2008–: Fontenay-le-Comte
- * Club domestic league appearances and goals

Anthony Gauvin (born 15 November 1973) is a French former professional footballer who played as a defender. During his career, he assisted Chamois Niortais, Saint-Étienne, Nice, Lorient, Le Havre, Brest and Fontenay-le-Comte.

He is the manager of Fontenay-le-Comte, a position he has held since 2008.

Whilst at Lorient Gauvin played in the 2002 Coupe de France Final in which they beat SC Bastia.
