= VK Mobile =

South Korean electronics company

- Industry: Electronics; Telecommunications
- Defunct: July 7, 2006
- Headquarters: South Korea
- Key people: Yi Cheol-sang (CEO)

VK Mobile was a South Korean company specialising in manufacturing mobile phone terminals. It was part of the brand name VK (short for Viable Korea) which was established in 2001. It originally started as an importer of Lithium ion polymer batteries for mobile phones in 1997, but began production of its own batteries in 2000 and mobile phones in 2001.

VK Mobile targeted primarily markets in Japan, Hong Kong, China, Europe, Australia, Taiwan, United States and Canada. The main technology has been CDMA and PCS but there have been also plans to expand into other areas.

The CEO of the company, Yi Cheol-sang, was already famous before he started business as one of the leaders of South Korean student activism.

On July 7, 2006, VK Mobile filed for bankruptcy after it suffered several financial difficulties resulting from operational loss.

== List of phone models ==
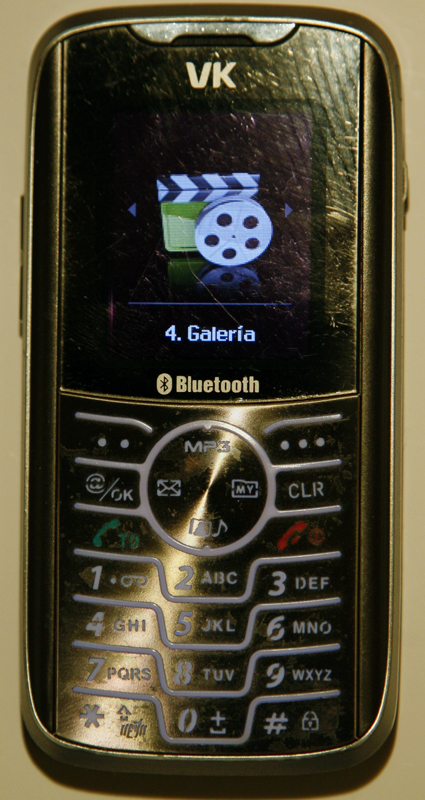
VK Mobile 2020-GSM, launched in February 2006

- VK Mobile VK580 (2004, Q3)
- VK Mobile VK610 (2004, Q3)
- VK Mobile VK700 (2005, Q1)
- VK Mobile VK1000 (2005, Q4)
- VK Mobile VK1010 (2005, Q4)
- VK Mobile VK1020 (2005, Q4)
- VK Mobile VK2000 (2006, February)

== See also ==
- Economy of South Korea
- Communications in South Korea
