= Departmental Council of Corse-du-Sud =

Departmental legislature in France

The Departmental Council of Corse-du-Sud (French: Conseil départemental de la Corse-du-Sud, Corsican: Cunsigliu Dipartimentale di Corse-du-Sud) is the deliberative assembly of the French department of Corse-du-Sud in the region of Corsica. It consists of 22 members (general councilors) from 11 cantons and its headquarters are in Ajaccio.

The President of the General Council is Pierre-Jean Luciani.

== Vice-Presidents ==
The President of the Departmental Council is assisted by 4 vice-presidents chosen from among the departmental advisers. Each of them has a delegation of authority.

List of vice-presidents of the Corse-du-Sud Departmental Council (as of 2021)
| Order | Name | Party |
|---|---|---|
| 1st | Jean-Jacques Panunzi | UMP |
| 2nd | Jeannine Ciabrini | UMP |
| 3rd | Francois Colonna | DVD |
| 4th | Lucie Frimigacci | DVD |
