= Guillaume Legras =

French footballer (born 1990)

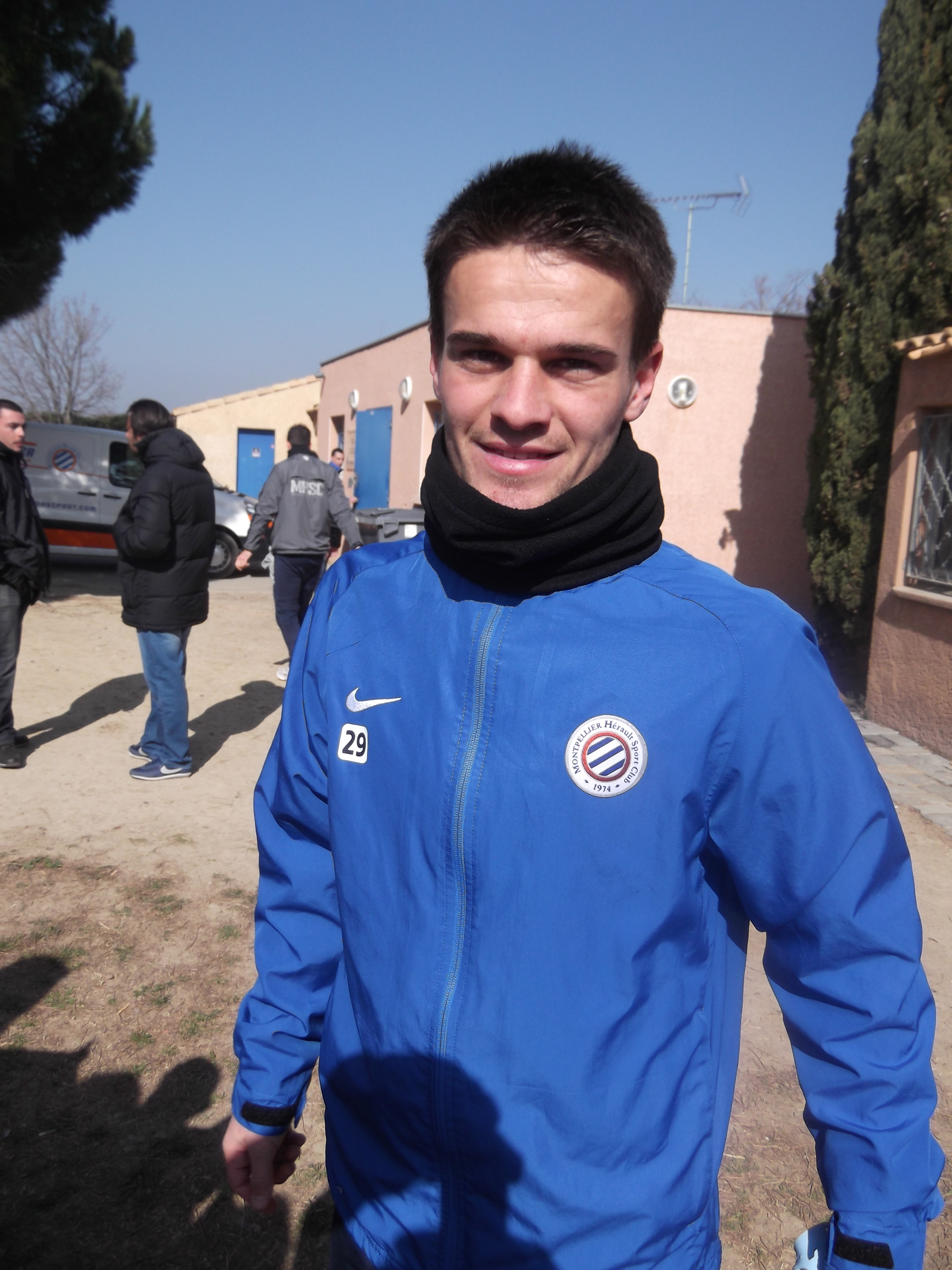

Personal information
- Date of birth: 17 January 1990 (age 36)
- Place of birth: France
- Position: Midfielder

Senior career*
| Years | Team | Apps | (Gls) |
| -2013 | Montpellier HSC | 0 | (0) |
| 2011-2012 | FC Martigues→(loan) | 30 | (0) |
| 2013-2015 | A.S.D. Barletta 1922 | 58 | (0) |
| 2015-2016 | U.C. AlbinoLeffe | 18 | (0) |
| 2016-2017 | U.S. Vibonese Calcio | 33 | (0) |
| 2017/2018 | Blois Football 41 | 9 | (0) |
- * Club domestic league appearances and goals

Guillaume Legras (born 17 January 1990) is a French retired footballer.

== Career ==
After failing to make an appearance for French Ligue 1 side Montpellier HSC, Legras was spotted by a scout from Italian second division club A.C. Reggina 1919 while playing at a tournament for out-of-contract players. Despite failing the trial, he eventually signed for A.S.D. Barletta 1922 in the Italian third division. In 2015, after the club went bankrupt, he trialed with Yeovil Town in England before joining another Italian third division team, U.C. AlbinoLeffe.

In 2017, Legras became a free agent again until he signed for French lower league outfit Blois Football 41 for the second half of 2017/18.
