= Martin Douillard =

French professional footballer (born 1985)

Personal information
- Full name: Martin Clément Douillard
- Date of birth: March 20, 1985 (age 41)
- Place of birth: Les Sables-d'Olonne, France
- Height: 1.73 m (5 ft 8 in)
- Position: Midfielder

Team information
- Current team: Aurillac Arpajon

Senior career*
Years	Team	Apps	(Gls)
2005–2008	Le Mans	45	(1)
2008–2010	Clermont	22	(1)
2010–2011	Luçon	6	(0)
2011–2012	Yverdon Sport	15	(2)
2012–2015	Mulhouse	80	(8)
2015–2016	Pau	26	(1)
2016–2018	Rodez	33	(4)
2018–	Aurillac Arpajon	9	(2)
- * Club domestic league appearances and goals as of 10:30, 6 December 2018 (UTC)

Martin Douillard (born March 20, 1985) is a French professional footballer who currently plays for FC Aurillac Arpajon Cantal Auvergne as a midfielder.

He has also represented Le Mans, Clermont Foot, Luçon, Mulhouse, Pau and Rodez.
