= Arnaud Le Lan =

French footballer (born 1978)

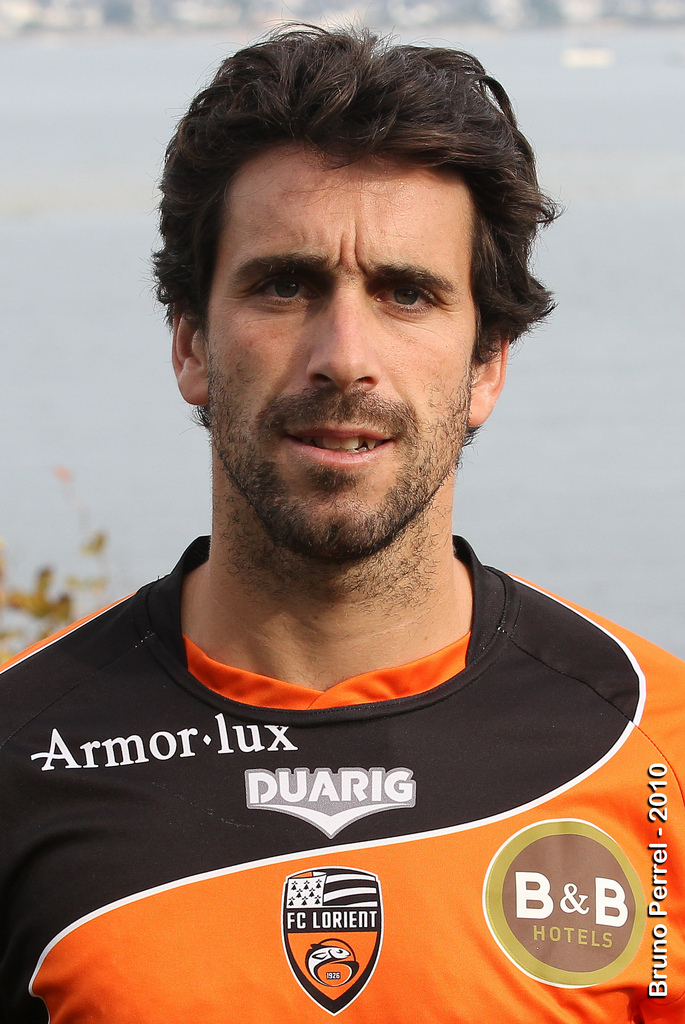
- Le Lan with Lorient in 2010

Personal information
- Date of birth: 22 March 1978 (age 48)
- Place of birth: Pontivy, France
- Position: Defender

Senior career*
Years	Team	Apps	(Gls)
1996–2002	Lorient	115	(2)
2002–2005	Rennes	58	(0)
2005–2008	Guingamp	87	(0)
2008–2013	Lorient	86	(1)
Total		346	(3)

International career
2011	Brittany	1	(0)
- * Club domestic league appearances and goals

Arnaud Le Lan (born 22 March 1978) is a French former professional footballer who played as a defender. He played his entire career in Brittany.

== Club career ==
Le Lan started his professional footballing career with Ligue 1 club Lorient in 1996. He stayed there until 2002 playing 100 games for the clubs. Whilst at Lorient Le Lan played in the 2002 Coupe de France Final in which they beat Bastia.

In 2002, he signed for Rennes.

In 2005, he signed for Guingamp for a fee worth €500,000. He played 87 games for the club.

In 2008, he rejoined his first football club Lorient. He retired at the end of the 2012–13 Ligue 1 with Lorient, at the age of 35

== Honours ==
Lorient

- Coupe de France: 2001–02
