= Geoffrey Dernis =

French footballer (born 1980)

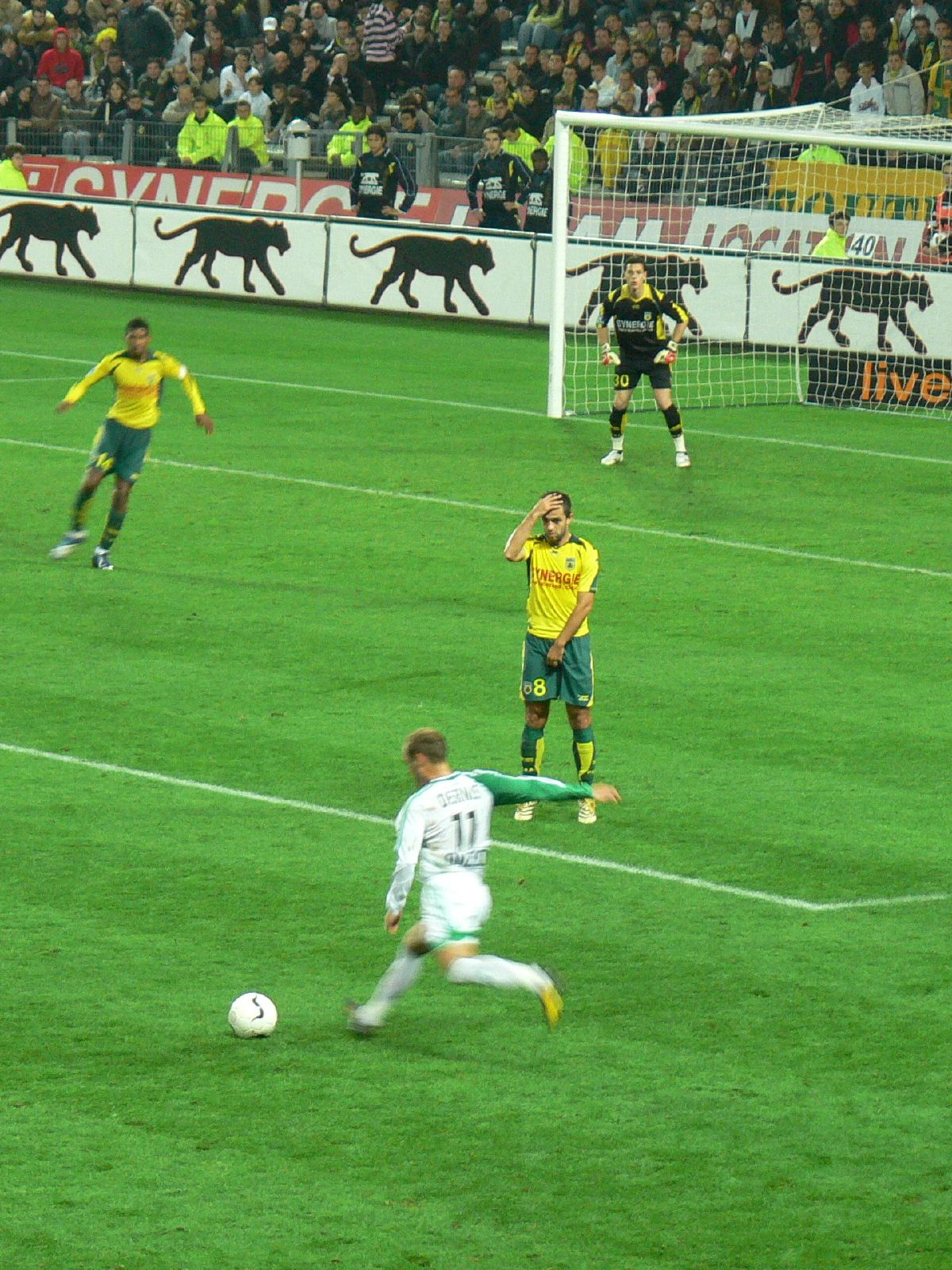
- Dernis taking a free kick in November 2006

Personal information
- Full name: Geoffrey Dernis
- Date of birth: 24 December 1980 (age 45)
- Place of birth: Grande-Synthe, France
- Height: 1.71 m (5 ft 7 in)
- Positions: Left winger; attacking midfielder

Team information
- Current team: Agde

Youth career
- Lille

Senior career*
Years	Team	Apps	(Gls)
1998–2001	Lille	14	(1)
2001–2003	Wasquehal	63	(11)
2003–2006	Lille	64	(5)
2006–2009	Saint-Étienne	81	(9)
2009–2012	Montpellier	60	(9)
2012–2014	Brest	39	(2)
2014–2015	AEL	2	(0)
2016–2018	AS Lattoise		(0)
2019–	Agde	3	(0)

International career
1996–1997	France U-17	3	(0)
- * Club domestic league appearances and goals as of 02:27, 5 December 2014 (UTC)

Geoffrey Dernis (born 24 December 1980) is a French footballer who plays as a midfielder for RCO Agde in the Championnat National 3.

== Honours ==
Lille

- Ligue 2: 1999–2000
- UEFA Intertoto Cup: 2004

Montpellier

- Ligue 1: 2011–12
