= 2005–06 Coupe de la Ligue =

French League Cup

Tournament details
- Country: France
- Dates: 20 September 2005 – 22 April 2006
- Teams: 43

Final positions
- Champions: Nancy (2nd title)
- Runners-up: Nice

Tournament statistics
- Matches played: 43
- Goals scored: 96 (2.23 per match)
- Top goal scorer: Arnaud Gonzalez (3 goals)

The 2005–06 Coupe de la Ligue, a knockout cup competition in French football organised by the Ligue de Football Professionnel, began on 20 September 2005. The final was held on 22 April 2006 at the Stade de France. AS Nancy defeated Nice 2–1 in the final. The defending champions RC Strasbourg were eliminated from the competition on 26 October 2005 by SM Caen.

== First round ==
The matches were played on 20 and 22 September 2005.

Team 1	Score	Team 2
Châteauroux	1–0 (a.e.t.)	Brest
Angers	2–3	Laval
Guingamp	3–1	Sète
Montpellier	1–1 (a.e.t.) (6–5 p)	Créteil
Dijon	2–1	Bastia
Gueugnon	0–0 (a.e.t.) (4–5 p)	Amiens
Clermont	2–1	Istres
Reims	0–1	Le Havre
Caen	5–0	Valenciennes
Niort	0–0 (a.e.t.) (4–5 p)	Sedan

== Second round ==
The matches were played on 25 and 26 October 2005.

Team 1	Score	Team 2
Lorient	5–4 (a.e.t.) (3–2 p)	Amiens
Nantes	1–1 (a.e.t.) (4–3 p)	Lyon
Bordeaux	1–0	Marseille
Le Mans	2–1	Clermont
Nice	2–0 (a.e.t.)	Châteauroux
Monaco	1–0	Dijon
Laval	0–1	Guingamp
Le Havre	0–1 (a.e.t.)	Toulouse
Montpellier	1–0	Rennes
Ajaccio	4–2 (a.e.t.)	Grenoble
Nancy	1–0	Sochaux
Lens	2–3	Auxerre
Sedan	1–0	Metz
Saint-Étienne	0–2	Lille
Caen	1–0	Strasbourg
Paris Saint-Germain	4–1	Troyes

== Round of 16 ==
The matches were played on 20 and 21 December 2005.

Team 1	Score	Team 2
Toulouse	2–0	Paris Saint-Germain
Montpellier	0–1	Ajaccio
Nancy	1–0	Lorient
Monaco	1–0	Lille
Auxerre	1–1 (a.e.t.) (1–4 p)	Le Mans
Guingamp	2–0	Caen
Nice	2–0	Sedan
Bordeaux	3–1	Nantes

== Final draw ==
Quarterfinals
H	Nancy	1
A	Ajaccio	0
H	Guingamp	2
A	Le Mans	3
H	Toulouse	0
A	Monaco	2
H	Nice	2
A	Bordeaux	1

Semifinals
H	Nancy	2
A	Le Mans	0
H	Monaco	0
A	Nice	1

Final
Nancy	2
Nice	1

== Final draw results ==
=== Quarter-finals ===
17 January 2006	Guingamp	1–1 (a.e.t.) (2–3 p)	Le Mans	Guingamp
	Gonzalez 112'	(Report)	Fauré 96'	Stadium: Stade du Roudourou; Attendance: 5,526; Referee: Claude Colombo
	Penalties
	Martini (penalty scored); Gonzalez (penalty missed); Le Lan (penalty scored); Abriel (penalty missed); Jouffre (penalty missed)		(penalty missed) de Melo; (penalty missed) Thomas; (penalty scored) Matsui; (penalty scored) Baša; (penalty missed) Douillard

17 January 2006	Nice	2–1 (a.e.t.)	Bordeaux	Nice
	Bellion 45'; Balmont 110'	(Report)	Šmicer 54'	Stadium: Stade du Ray; Attendance: 7,924; Referee: Alain Sars

18 January 2006	Toulouse	0–2	Monaco	Toulouse
		(Report)	Plašil 66'; Vieri 93'	Stadium: Stadium Municipal; Attendance: 15,712; Referee: Éric Poulat

18 January 2006	Nancy	1–0	Ajaccio	Nancy
	Puygrenier 24'	(Report)		Stadium: Stade Marcel Picot; Attendance: 9,033; Referee: Pascal Garibian

=== Semi-finals ===
7 February 2006	Monaco	0–1	Nice	Monaco
		(Report)	Ederson 88'	Stadium: Stade Louis II; Attendance: 17,341; Referee: Laurent Duhamel

7 February 2006	Nancy	2–0	Le Mans	Nancy
	Brison 44' da Costa 63'	(Report)		Stadium: Stade Marcel Picot; Attendance: 19,612; Referee: Stéphane Lannoy

=== Final ===
22 April 2006
20:50

Nancy	2–1	Nice
Zerka 22'; Kim 65'		Vahirua 48'

Stade de France, Saint-Denis
Attendance: 76,830
Referee: Bertrand Layec

=== Topscorer ===
Arnaud Gonzalez (3 goals)
