= 2005–06 Coupe de France =

Tournament details
- Country: France
- Teams: 6,394

Final positions
- Champions: Paris Saint-Germain
- Runners-up: Marseille

Tournament statistics
- Top goal scorer(s): Pauleta; Toifilou Maoulida; John Utaka (5 goals)

The Coupe de France's results of the 2005–06 season. Six thousand three hundred and ninety-four clubs participated in the cup and the final was played on 29 April 2006 between PSG and Olympique de Marseille. As winners, PSG qualified for the first round of the 2006–07 UEFA Cup.

== Round of 64 ==
Team 1	Score	Team 2
Vannes (Nat.)	1–2	Lorient (L2)
Strasbourg (L1)	4–0	Nancy (L1)
Saint-Étienne (L1)	0–1 (a.e.t.)	Lille (L1)
Le Mans (L1)	0–1	Lens (L1)
Brest (L2)	3–0	Nice (L1)
Nantes (L1)	2–1	Valenciennes (L2)
Lyon-Duchère (CFA)	2–1	Toulouse (L1)
Calais (CFA)	3–2 (a.e.t.)	Troyes (L1)
Wasquehal (CFA)	1–3	Bordeaux (L1)
Corte (CFA2)	2–3	Rennes (L1)
Saint-Lô (CFA2)	0–2	Ajaccio (L1)
Oissel (CFA2)	1–2 (a.e.t.)	Sochaux (L1)
Vermelles (DH)	0–4	Paris Saint-Germain (L1)
Drancy (DSR)	0–4	Metz (L1)
Moulins (Nat.)	3–3 (a.e.t.) (5–3 p)	Istres (L2)
Bastia (L2)	3–3 (a.e.t.) (3–1 p)	Louhans-Cuiseaux (Nat.)
Châteauroux (L2)	2–0	Yzeure (CFA)
Dijon (L2)	2–1	Forbach (CFA2)
Amiens (L2)	2–0	Plabennec (CFA2)
Montpellier (L2)	2–1	Hyères (CFA2)
Longuenesse (PH)	0–4^{1}	Caen (L2)
Cannes (Nat.)	1–1 (a.e.t.) (3–4 p)	Agde (CFA)
Saint-Pryvé (CFA2)	0–6	Entente SSG (Nat.)
Sainte-Geneviève (CFA)	5–0	Mulhouse (CFA)
Brive (CFA)	0–0 (a.e.t.) (4–5 p)	Bois-Guillaume (CFA)
Fontenay (CFA2)	0–1	Vitré (CFA)
Roye-Noyon (CFA)	1–0	Alençon (CFA2)
Saint-Louis Neuweg (DH)	1–2	Colmar (CFA2)
Grenoble (L2)	0–4	Lyon (L1)
Marseille (L1)	4–0	Le Havre (L2)
Noisy-le-Sec (CFA)	0–1	Auxerre (L1)
Rhône Vallées (CFA2)	0–6	Monaco (L1)

^{1}Longuenesse won administratively.

== Round of 32 ==
Team 1	Score	Team 2
Paris Saint-Germain (L1)	1–0	Auxerre (L1)
Marseille (L1)	2–0	Metz (L1)
Nantes (L1)	2–0	Bois-Guillaume (CFA)
Rennes (L1)	1–0	Lens (L1)
Lille (L1)	1–0	Lorient (L2)
Lyon (L1)	2–1 (a.e.t.)	Ajaccio (L1)
Calais (CFA)	1–0	Sainte-Geneviève (CFA)
Montpellier (L2)	6–1	Roye-Noyon (CFA)
Lyon-Duchère (CFA)	0–0 (a.e.t.) (5–4 p)	Strasbourg (L1)
Sochaux (L1)	2–1	Châteauroux (L2)
Dijon (L2)	1–0	Moulins (Nat.)
Colmar (CFA2)	1–0	Monaco (L1)
Vitré (CFA)	3–1	Longuenesse (PH)
Bastia (L2)	2–0 (a.e.t.)	Agde (CFA)
Brest (L2)	2–0	Amiens (L2)
Bordeaux (L1)	2–1	Entente SSG (Nat.)

== Round of 16 ==
Team 1	Score	Team 2
Marseille (L1)	2–0	Sochaux (L1)
Calais (CFA)	1–0 (a.e.t.)	Brest (L2)
Vitré (CFA)	0–2	Lille (L1)
Montpellier (L2)	1–0	Bordeaux (L1)
Lyon-Duchère (CFA)	0–3	Paris Saint-Germain (L1)
Colmar (CFA2)	1–4	Rennes (L1)
Nantes (L1)	3–0	Dijon (L2)
Lyon (L1)	1–0	Bastia (L2)

== Quarter-finals ==
11 April 2006	Paris Saint-Germain (1)	2–1	Lille (1)	Paris
18:15	Kalou 40'; Pauleta 57'		Tavlaridis 30'	Stadium: Parc des Princes; Attendance: 21,345; Referee: Claude Colombo

11 April 2006	Lyon (1)	1–2	Marseille (1)	Lyon
21:00 CEST	Fred 21'		Maoulida 17'; Niang 65'	Stadium: Stade de Gerland; Attendance: 38,885; Referee: Bertrand Layec

12 April 2006	Rennes (1)	5–3 (a.e.t.)	Montpellier (2)	Rennes
18:00	Briand 2'; Monterrubio 97', 102'; Utaka 104'; Källström 110'		Lafourcade 10', 103', 111'	Stadium: Route de Lorient; Attendance: 17,998; Referee: Pascal Garibian

12 April 2006	Calais (4)	0–1	Nantes (2)	Lens
20:45 CEST (UTC+2)			Da Rocha 88'	Stadium: Stade Félix-Bollaert; Attendance: 25,463; Referee: Thierry Auriac

== Semi-finals ==
20 April 2006	Marseille (1)	3–0	Rennes (1)	Marseille
17:00	Ribéry 1'; Taiwo 19'; Niang 45'			Stadium: Stade Vélodrome; Attendance: 57,000; Referee: Hervé Piccirillo

20 April 2006	Nantes (1)	1–2	Paris Saint-Germain (1)	Nantes
20:45	Cetto 72'		Pancrate 68'; Pauleta 86'	Stadium: Stade de la Beaujoire; Attendance: 35,968; Referee: Damien Ledentu

== Final ==
29 April 2006
20:45

Marseille	1–2	Paris Saint-Germain
Maoulida 67'		Kalou 5'; Dhorasoo 49'

Stade de France, Saint-Denis
Attendance: 79,061
Referee: Laurent Duhamel

== Top scorers ==
Rank	Player	Club	Goals
1	(Portugal) Pauleta	Paris Saint-Germain	5
1	(Mayotte) Toifilou Maoulida	Marseille	5
1	(Nigeria) John Utaka	Rennes	5
