= 2004–05 AS Monaco FC season =

AS Monaco
2004–05 season
- President: Michel Pastor
- Head coach: Didier Deschamps
- Stadium: Stade Louis II
- Ligue 1: 3rd
- Coupe de la Ligue: Semi-final (vs. SM Caen)
- Coupe de France: Semi-final (vs. Sedan)
- Champions League: Round of 16 (vs. PSV Eindhoven)
- Top goalscorer: League: Javier Chevantón; Mohamed Kallon (10 each); All: Emmanuel Adebayor; Javier Chevantón (13 each)
Home colours

The 2004–05 season was AS Monaco FC's 48th season in Ligue 1. They again finished third in Ligue 1, whilst getting knocked out of the Coupe de la Ligue and Coupe de France at the Semifinal stage by Caen and Sedan respectively.

== Squad ==
Note: Flags indicate national team as defined under FIFA eligibility rules; some limited exceptions apply. Players may hold more than one non-FIFA nationality.

No.	Pos.	Nation	Player
1	GK	FRA	Fabien Audard (loan from Lorient)
3	DF	FRA	Patrice Evra
4	DF	FRA	François Modesto
5	MF	URU	Diego Pérez
6	MF	CZE	Jaroslav Plašil
7	MF	ARG	Lucas Bernardi
8	FW	SLE	Mohamed Kallon
9	FW	ARG	Javier Saviola (loan from Barcelona)
10	FW	URU	Javier Chevantón
12	DF	ITA	Joseph Dayo Oshadogan
13	DF	BRA	Maicon
15	MF	GRE	Akis Zikos
16	GK	FRA	André Biancarelli
17	MF	FRA	Jimmy Juan

No.	Pos.	Nation	Player
18	FW	COD	Shabani Nonda
19	DF	FRA	Sébastien Squillaci
20	DF	FRA	Arnaud Lescure
21	MF	SWE	Pontus Farnerud
22	FW	FRA	David Gigliotti
24	FW	TOG	Emmanuel Adebayor
25	FW	SEN	Souleymane Camara
27	DF	FRA	Julien Rodriguez
30	GK	ITA	Flavio Roma
31	DF	FRA	Olivier Veigneau
32	DF	FRA	Gaël Givet
34	MF	FRA	Marko Muslin
35	MF	NOR	Hassan El Fakiri
41	FW	FRA	Nicolas Maurice-Belay

=== Out on loan ===
Note: Flags indicate national team as defined under FIFA eligibility rules; some limited exceptions apply. Players may hold more than one non-FIFA nationality.

No.	Pos.	Nation	Player
—	DF	POR	Marco Ramos (at US Créteil)
—	MF	MLI	Djibril Sidibé (at Bastia)
—	MF	FRA	Nicolas Hislen (at Lorient)

No.	Pos.	Nation	Player
—	FW	FRA	Laurent Lanteri (at Châteauroux)
—	FW	FRA	Sébastien Grax (at Troyes)

== Transfers ==
In: Note: Flags indicate national team as defined under FIFA eligibility rules; some limited exceptions apply. Players may hold more than one non-FIFA nationality.

No.	Pos.	Nation	Player
1	GK	FRA	Fabien Audard (loan from (France) Lorient)
4	DF	FRA	François Modesto (from (Italy) Cagliari)
5	MF	URU	Diego Pérez (from (Uruguay) Peñarol)
8	FW	SLE	Mohamed Kallon (from (Italy) Inter Milan)
9	FW	ARG	Javier Saviola (loan from (Spain) Barcelona)
10	FW	URU	Javier Chevantón (from (Italy) Lecce)
13	DF	BRA	Maicon (from (Brazil) Cruzeiro)
21	MF	SWE	Pontus Farnerud (loan return from (France) Strasbourg)
34	MF	FRA	Marko Muslin (from (Serbia and Montenegro) Red Star Belgrade)

Out: Note: Flags indicate national team as defined under FIFA eligibility rules; some limited exceptions apply. Players may hold more than one non-FIFA nationality.

No.	Pos.	Nation	Player
1	GK	FRA	Stéphane Porato (to (France) Ajaccio)
4	DF	ARG	Hugo Ibarra (loan return to (Portugal) Porto)
8	MF	FRA	Ludovic Giuly (to (Spain) Barcelona)
9	FW	CRO	Dado Pršo (to (Scotland) Rangers)
10	FW	ESP	Fernando Morientes (loan return to (Spain) Real Madrid)
14	MF	FRA	Édouard Cissé (loan return to (France) Paris Saint-Germain)
21	MF	FRA	Nicolas Hislen (loan to (France) Lorient)
22	FW	FRA	Laurent Lanteri (loan to (France) Châteauroux)
25	MF	FRA	Jérôme Rothen (to (France) Paris Saint-Germain)
28	DF	POR	Marco Ramos (loan to (France) Créteil)
29	GK	SEN	Tony Sylva (to (France) Lille)
31	FW	FRA	Sébastien Grax (loan to (France) Troyes)
33	FW	FRA	Nicolas Raynier (to (France) Lille)
38	MF	FRA	Laurent Mohellebi (to (France) Istres)
—	MF	MLI	Djibril Sidibé (loan to (France) Bastia)

== Competitions ==
=== Ligue 1 ===
==== League table ====
Pos	Team	Pld	W	D	L	GF	GA	GD	Pts	Qualification or relegation
1	Lyon (C)	38	22	13	3	56	22	+34	79	Qualification to Champions League group stage
2	Lille	38	18	13	7	52	29	+23	67	Qualification to Champions League group stage
3	Monaco	38	15	18	5	52	35	+17	63	Qualification to Champions League third qualifying round
4	Rennes	38	15	10	13	49	42	+7	55	Qualification to UEFA Cup first round
5	Marseille	38	15	10	13	47	42	+5	55	Qualification to Intertoto Cup third round

Source: Ligue 1
Rules for classification: 1) points; 2) goal difference; 3) number of goals scored.
(C) Champions

==== Results summary ====
Overall								Home						Away					
Pld	W	D	L	GF	GA	GD	Pts	W	D	L	GF	GA	GD	W	D	L	GF	GA	GD
38	15	18	5	52	35	+17	63	11	6	2	38	21	+17	4	12	3	14	14	0

Last updated: 31 March 2015.
Source: Soccerway

==== Results by round ====
Round	1	2	3	4	5	6	7	8	9	10	11	12	13	14	15	16	17	18	19	20	21	22	23	24	25	26	27	28	29	30	31	32	33	34	35	36	37	38
Ground	A	H	A	A	H	A	H	A	H	A	H	A	H	A	H	A	H	A	H	A	H	H	A	H	A	H	A	H	A	H	A	H	A	H	A	H	A	H
Result	W	W	L	D	W	W	W	D	L	D	D	D	D	D	L	D	W	W	D	W	W	W	D	W	D	D	L	D	D	W	L	W	D	W	D	W	D	D
Position	4	2	7	9	5	1	1	1	3	4	4	4	5	5	6	7	6	3	4	3	3	3	4	3	4	4	4	4	4	3	4	4	4	3	3	3	3	3

Source: Ligue 1
A = Away; H = Home; W = Win; D = Draw; L = Loss

==== Results ====
7 August 2004 1	Saint-Étienne	0–1	AS Monaco	Saint-Étienne
17:15 CEST (UTC+2)	Hellebuyck (yellow card) 55'	Report	Chevantón 2', (yellow card) 51'; Pérez (yellow card) 51'; Bernardi (yellow card) 54'; Juan (yellow card) 84'; Zikos (yellow card) 87'; Roma (yellow card) 90'	Stadium: Stade Geoffroy-Guichard; Attendance: 32,459; Referee: Laurent Duhamel

14 August 2004 2	AS Monaco	2–1	Istres	Fontvieille
20:00 CEST (UTC+2)	Kallon 5', (yellow card) 6'; Maicon 29'; Chevantón (yellow card) 63'	Report	Kehiha (yellow card) 46'; Hamed (yellow card) 80'; Montaño 81'	Stadium: Stade Louis II; Attendance: 12,687; Referee: Dominique Fraise

21 August 2004 3	SM Caen	1–0	AS Monaco	Caen
20:00 CEST (UTC+2)	Watier (yellow card) 20', (goal) 22'; Dugardein (yellow card) 43'; Deroin (yellow card) 89'	Report	Pérez (yellow card) 35'; Farnerud (yellow card) 55'	Stadium: Stade Michel d'Ornano; Attendance: 20,651; Referee: Pascal Vileo

28 August 2004 4	Lens	1–1	AS Monaco	Lens
20:00 CEST (UTC+2)	Gillet (yellow card) 42'; Bąk (yellow card) 68'	Report	Kallon 8'; Zikos (yellow card) 44'; Maicon (yellow card) 62'; Evra (yellow card) 76'; Adebayor (yellow card) 82'	Stadium: Stade Bollaert-Delelis; Attendance: 39,019; Referee: Pascal Garibian

11 September 2004 5	AS Monaco	3–1	Strasbourg	Fontvieille
20:00 CEST (UTC+2)	Adebayor 3'; Kallon 57' (pen.), (yellow card) 57'; Maicon (yellow card) 84'; Saviola 85'; Rodriguez (yellow card) 89'	Report	Pagis 40'; Fahmi (yellow card) 60'	Stadium: Stade Louis II; Attendance: 9,931; Referee: Patrick Lhermitte

19 September 2004 6	Paris Saint-Germain	0–1	AS Monaco	Paris
21:00 CEST (UTC+2)	Yepes (yellow card) 26'; Cana (yellow card) 58'	Report	Kallon (yellow card) 16'; Squillaci (yellow card) 58'; Adebayor 82'	Stadium: Parc des Princes; Attendance: 40,039; Referee: Stéphane Bré

22 September 2004 7	AS Monaco	2–1	Nantes	Fontvieille
20:30 CEST (UTC+2)	Farnerud 47'; Maicon (yellow card) 55'; Zikos (yellow card) 60'; Rodriguez (yellow card) 66'; Modesto (yellow card) 80'; Kallon 89' (pen.)	Report	Toulalan (yellow card) 32'; Bratu 44'; Da Rocha (yellow card) 60'; Capoue (yellow card) 86'; Faé (yellow card) 89'	Stadium: Stade Louis II; Attendance: 8,893; Referee: Hervé Piccirillo

25 September 2004 8	Lyon	0–0	AS Monaco	Lyon
17:15 CEST (UTC+2)	Berthod (yellow card) 13'; Cris (yellow card) 41'; Diarra (yellow card) 66'	Report	Pérez (yellow card) 44' (yellow-red card) 60'; Maicon (yellow card) 89'	Stadium: Stade de Gerland; Attendance: 38,825; Referee: Laurent Duhamel

2 October 2004 9	AS Monaco	3–4	Nice	Fontvieille
20:00 CEST (UTC+2)	Saviola 5'; Adebayor 20', 60'; Evra (yellow card) 55'; Rodriguez (yellow card) 88' (yellow-red card) 89'	Report	Agali (yellow card) 44', (goal) 66', 72', 74'; Cobos (yellow card) 75'; Vahirua 82'; Traoré (red card) 89'	Stadium: Stade Louis II; Attendance: 16,374; Referee: Éric Poulat

16 October 2004 10	Metz	1–1	AS Monaco	Metz
20:00 CEST (UTC+2)	Avezac (yellow card) 24'; Leca (yellow card) 33'; Djiba (yellow card) 40', (goal) 83'	Report	Kallon (yellow card) 44'; El Fakiri (yellow card) 49'; Adebayor 55'; Pérez (yellow card) 63'	Stadium: Stade Saint-Symphorien; Attendance: 23,987; Referee: Stéphane Lannoy

24 October 2004 11	AS Monaco	0–0	Auxerre	Fontvieille
18:00 CEST (UTC+2)	Bernardi (yellow card) 53'; Evra (yellow card) 88'	Report	Kalou (yellow card) 63'; Mathis (yellow card) 64'	Stadium: Stade Louis II; Attendance: 11,613; Referee: Alain Hamer

29 October 2004 12	Marseille	1–1	AS Monaco	Marseille
21:00 CEST (UTC+2)	Koke 19'; Déhu (yellow card) 27'	Report	Evra (yellow card) 28' (yellow-red card) 90'; Squillaci 31'; Chevantón (yellow card) 39'	Stadium: Stade Vélodrome; Attendance: 55,780; Referee: Bertrand Layec

6 November 2004 13	AS Monaco	2–2	Ajaccio	Fontvieille
20:00 CET (UTC+1)	Saviola 36'; Kallon 78' (pen.); Roma (yellow card) 87'	Report	Džodić 16'; Gaspar (yellow card) 70'; Porato (yellow card) 78'; Demont (yellow card) 85'; Ouadah (yellow card) 89'	Stadium: Stade Louis II; Attendance: 9,832; Referee: Bruno Ruffray

14 November 2004 14	Lille	1–1	AS Monaco	Villeneuve d'Ascq
21:00 CET (UTC+1)	Ačimovič (yellow card) 20'; Landrin 42', (yellow card) 42'	Report	Zikos (yellow card) 9'; Chevantón 30'	Stadium: Stadium Nord de Villeneuve d'Ascq; Attendance: 13,577; Referee: Stéphane Bré

19 November 2004 15	AS Monaco	1–3	Sochaux	Fontvieille
17:00 CET (UTC+1)	Kallon (yellow card) 34'; Modesto (yellow card) 39'; Zikos (yellow card) 67'; Adebayor 68'	Report	Ménez 31'; Tall (yellow card) 47'; Oruma (yellow card) 57', (goal) 63'; Ilan (yellow card) 75', (goal) 79'	Stadium: Stade Louis II; Attendance: 12,897; Referee: Pascal Viléo

27 November 2004 16	Toulouse	0–0	AS Monaco	Toulouse
20:00 CET (UTC+1)	Taïder (yellow card) 40'	Report	Modesto (yellow card) 48'	Stadium: Stadium Municipal; Attendance: 31,568; Referee: Pascal Garibian

3 December 2004 17	AS Monaco	2–0	Rennes	Fontvieille
20:00 CET (UTC+1)	Givet (yellow card) 21'; Kallon 30'; Chevantón 31'; Evra (yellow card) 84'	Report	Mornar (yellow card) 15'; Jeunechamp (yellow card) 90'	Stadium: Stade Louis II; Attendance: 8,089; Referee: Stéphane Moulin

11 December 2004 18	Bastia	0–2	AS Monaco	Furiani
20:00 CET (UTC+1)	Sidibé (yellow card) 13'; Jau (yellow card) 24'; Yahia (yellow card) 43'; Vanney (yellow card) 70'	Report	Squillaci (yellow card) 18'; Chevantón 19', (yellow card) 29'; Saviola 44'; Evra (yellow card) 74'	Stadium: Stade Armand Cesari; Attendance: 4,618; Referee: Philippe Kalt

18 December 2004 19	AS Monaco	1–1	Bordeaux	Fontvieille
17:15 CET (UTC+1)	Kallon 42'; Zikos (yellow card) 55'; Maicon (yellow card) 87'	Report	Darcheville 7'; Cohade (yellow card) 44'; Meriem (yellow card) 78'	Stadium: Stade Louis II; Attendance: 12,438; Referee: Bertrand Layec

12 January 2005 20	Istres	0–1	AS Monaco	Fos-sur-Mer
20:30 CET (UTC+1)	Saveljić (yellow card) 13'; Pérez (yellow card) 20'	Report	Camara 15'; Maicon (yellow card) 44'; Givet (yellow card) 53'; Oshadogan (yellow card) 89'	Stadium: Stade Parsemain; Attendance: 6,390; Referee: Fredy Fautrel

15 January 2005 21	AS Monaco	5–2	SM Caen	Fontvieille
20:00 CET (UTC+1)	Kallon 8', 50' (pen.); Maicon 37'; Saviola 42'; Plašil 80'	Report	Hengbart (yellow card) 20'; Watier 33', (yellow card) 80'; Zubar (yellow card) 49'; Danjou (yellow card) 63'; Hebert (yellow card) 76'; Bakour (yellow card) 82'; Lemaître 87'	Stadium: Stade Louis II; Attendance: 7,834; Referee: Stéphane Lannoy

22 January 2005 22	AS Monaco	2–0	Lens	Fontvieille
20:00 CET (UTC+1)	Saviola 20'; Maicon 40'; Givet (yellow card) 52'	Report	Assou-Ekotto (yellow card) 39'; Diarra (yellow card) 44'	Stadium: Stade Louis II; Attendance: 9,354; Referee: Olivier Thual

26 January 2005 23	Strasbourg	Postponed	AS Monaco	Strasbourg
CET (UTC+1)		[ Report]		Stadium: Stade de la Meinau

30 January 2005 24	AS Monaco	2–0	Paris Saint-Germain	Fontvieille
21:00 CET (UTC+1)	Plašil (yellow card) 29'; Kallon 36'; Bernardi 56'	Report	Armand (yellow card) 23'; Yepes (yellow card) 40'	Stadium: Stade Louis II; Attendance: 12,147

5 February 2005 25	Nantes	0–0	AS Monaco	Nantes
20:00 CET (UTC+1)	Da Rocha (yellow card) 24'; Viveros (yellow card) 74'	Report	Plašil (yellow card) 24'; Squillaci (yellow card) 76'	Stadium: Stade de la Beaujoire; Attendance: 33,671; Referee: Tony Chapron

18 February 2005 26	AS Monaco	1–1	Lyon	Fontvieille
21:00 CET (UTC+1)	Zikos (yellow card) 17'; Bernardi (yellow card) 63'; Rodriguez 84'; Pérez (yellow card) 87'	Report	Diatta (yellow card) 27'; Essien (yellow card) 63' (yellow-red card) 64'; Juninho (yellow card) 88'; Clément 89'	Stadium: Stade Louis II; Attendance: 17,188; Referee: Pascal Garibian

26 February 2005 27	Nice	2–1	AS Monaco	Nice
20:00 CET (UTC+1)	Balmont 13'; Agali (yellow card) 43'; Ederson 66'; Djetou (yellow card) 68'; Varrault (yellow card) 69'; Gregorini (yellow card) 85'	Report	Evra (yellow card) 16'; Gigliotti 60', (yellow card) 60'; Kallon (yellow card) 71'; Givet (yellow card) 86'	Stadium: Stade du Ray; Attendance: 12,775; Referee: Laurent Duhamel

5 March 2005 28	AS Monaco	0–0	Metz	Fontvieille
20:00 CET (UTC+1)	Evra (yellow card) 58'; Zikos (yellow card) 78'	Report	Gvozdenović (yellow card) 27'	Stadium: Stade Louis II; Attendance: 8,079; Referee: Philippe Malige

13 March 2005 29	Auxerre	2–2	AS Monaco	Auxerre
21:00 CET (UTC+1)	Akalé (yellow card) 16'; Pieroni 54'; Jaurès 76' (pen.)	Report	Pérez (yellow card) 27'; Modesto (yellow card) 28', (goal) 56'; Rodriguez 45'	Stadium: Stade de l'Abbé-Deschamps; Attendance: 10,454; Referee: Pascal Viléo

16 March 2005 23	Strasbourg	0–0	AS Monaco	Strasbourg
19:00 CET (UTC+1)	Kanté (yellow card) 83'; Farnerud (yellow card) 90'	Report	Bernardi (yellow card) 42'; Modesto (yellow card) 67'; Roma (yellow card) 89'	Stadium: Stade de la Meinau; Attendance: 21,253; Referee: Bruno Derrien

20 March 2005 30	AS Monaco	2–1	Marseille	Fontvieille
21:00 CET (UTC+1)	Maicon 24'; Adebayor 42', (yellow card) 55'; Zikos (yellow card) 61'	Report	Bernardi 54' (o.g.); Batlles (yellow card) 61'; N'Diaye (yellow card) 89'	Stadium: Stade Louis II; Attendance: 17,315; Referee: Bertrand Layec

2 April 2005 31	Ajaccio	3–0	AS Monaco	Ajaccio
20:00 CEST (UTC+2)	Faria 32', 42'; André Luiz 45'; Seck (yellow card) 66'	Report	Farnerud (yellow card) 44'; Rodriguez (yellow card) 64'	Stadium: Stade François Coty; Attendance: 3,891; Referee: Stéphane Bré

16 April 2005 33	Sochaux	1–1	AS Monaco	Montbéliard
20:00 CEST (UTC+2)	Pitau (yellow card) 6'; Ilan 37'; Paisley (yellow card) 69'; Isabey (yellow card) 82'	Report	Chevantón 10', (yellow card) 34'; Evra (yellow card) 64'; Zikos (yellow card) 80'; Adebayor (red card) 87'	Stadium: Stade Auguste Bonal; Attendance: 19,696; Referee: Jean-Paul Chaudre

23 April 2005 34	AS Monaco	2–1	Toulouse	Fontvieille
17:15 CEST (UTC+2)	Chevantón (yellow card) 31', (goal) 64' (pen.); Saviola 54'; Maicon (yellow card) 55'; Zikos (yellow card) 80'	Report	Dieuze (yellow card) 49'; Taïder (yellow card) 56'; Suarez 71'	Stadium: Stade Louis II; Attendance: 10,071; Referee: Éric Poulat

1 May 2015 32	AS Monaco	2–0	Lille	Fontvieille
21:00 CEST (UTC+2)	Bernardi (yellow card) 33'; Squillaci 64'; Adebayor 90'	Report	Tafforeau (yellow card) 24'; Bodmer (yellow card) 30'; Tavlaridis (yellow card) 44' (yellow-red card) 89'	Stadium: Stade Louis II; Attendance: 11,595; Referee: Philippe Kalt

7 May 2005 35	Rennes	0–0	AS Monaco	Rennes
20:00 CEST (UTC+2)	Adaílton (yellow card) 17'	Report	Squillaci (yellow card) 20'; Zikos (yellow card) 51'	Stadium: Stade de la Route de Lorient; Attendance: 29,085; Referee: Hervé Piccirillo

14 May 2005 36	AS Monaco	5–2	Bastia	Fontvieille
20:00 CEST (UTC+2)	Chevantón 9', 36', 44'; Saviola 46'; Adebayor 86'	Report	Hadji 2'; Chimbonda 57'; Penneteau (red card) 89'	Stadium: Stade Louis II; Attendance: 9,878; Referee: Bruno Derrien

21 May 2005 37	Bordeaux	1–1	AS Monaco	Bordeaux
20:45 CEST (UTC+2)	Jurietti (yellow card) 5'; Laslandes (yellow card) 44'; Chamakh 79'	Report	Maicon (yellow card) 16'; Bernardi (yellow card) 44'; Chevantón (yellow card) 53'; Squillaci 89'	Stadium: Stade Chaban-Delmas; Attendance: 24,224; Referee: Laurent Duhamel

28 May 2005 38	AS Monaco	1–1	Saint-Étienne	Fontvieille
20:00 CEST (UTC+2)	Chevantón 1'; Zikos (yellow card) 26'; Givet (yellow card) 87'; Modesto (yellow card) 89'	Report	Sablé 10', (yellow card) 43'; Hellebuyck (yellow card) 42'; Piquionne (yellow card) 53'; Feindouno (yellow card) 89'	Stadium: Stade Louis II; Attendance: 17,512; Referee: Damien Ledentu

=== Coupe de la Ligue ===
9 November 2004 Round of 32	Sedan	0–1	AS Monaco	Sedan
19:00 CET UTC+1	Noro (yellow card) 7'; Sabin (yellow card) 57'; Charpenet (yellow card) 90'; Ducourtioux (red card) 90'	Report	Givet (yellow card) 44'; Chevantón 51'; Saviola (yellow card) 56'	Stadium: Stade Louis Dugauguez; Attendance: 16,731; Referee: Philippe Kalt

21 December 2004 Round of 16	AS Monaco	1–0	Guingamp	Fontvieille
21:00 CET UTC+1	Kallon (yellow card) 57'; Adebayor 82'	Report	Bridonneau (yellow card) 12'; Kouassi (yellow card) 87' (red card) 89'	Stadium: Stade Louis II; Attendance: 8,400; Referee: Thierry Auriac

19 January 2005 Quarter-final	Montpellier	1–2	AS Monaco	Montpellier
21:00 CET UTC+1	Lafourcade 80', (yellow card) 82'	Report	Oshadogan (yellow card) 24'; Modesto (yellow card) 44'; Adebayor 59'; Veigneau 78'	Stadium: Stade de la Mosson; Attendance: 19,828; Referee: Stéphane Duhamel

2 February 2005 Semi-final	Caen	3–1	AS Monaco	Caen
21:00 CET UTC+1	Lemaître (yellow card) 8', (goal) 42'; Mazure 31'; Watier 52' (pen.); Dugardein (yellow card) 59'	Report	Camara (yellow card) 57'; Audard (yellow card) 64' (yellow-red card) 64'; Adebayor 82'	Stadium: Stade Michel d'Ornano; Attendance: 18,697; Referee: Philippe Kalt

=== Coupe de France ===
8 January 2005 Round of 64	Seyssinet	0–7	AS Monaco	Seyssinet-Pariset
CET UTC+1		[ Report]	Evra 15'; Saviola 30', 64'; Camara 32', 36'; Kallon 80', 90'	Stadium: Complexe Sportif Joseph Guetat

12 February 2005 Round of 32	Libourne Saint-Seurin-sur-L'Isle	2–4	AS Monaco	Libourne
CET UTC+1	Vieira 52'; Thèze 87'	[ Report]	Saviola 25', 87', 90'; Astier 81' (o.g.)	Stadium: Stade Jean-Antoine Moueix

2 March 2005 Round of 16	Rennes	0–1 (a.e.t.)	AS Monaco	Rennes
CET UTC+1		[ Report]	Saviola 94'	Stadium: Stade de la Route de Lorient

19 April 2005 Quarter-final	AS Monaco	1–0 (a.e.t.)	Clermont Foot	Fontvieille
CET UTC+1	Camara 105'	[ Report]		Stadium: Stade Louis II

11 May 2005 Semi-final	AS Monaco	0–1	Sedan	Fontvieille
CET UTC+1		[ Report]	Citony 75'	Stadium: Stade Louis II

=== UEFA Champions League ===
==== Group stage ====
Pos	Team	Pld	W	D	L	GF	GA	GD	Pts	Qualification
1	(France) Monaco	6	4	0	2	10	4	+6	12	Advance to knockout stage
2	(England) Liverpool	6	3	1	2	6	3	+3	10	Advance to knockout stage
3	(Greece) Olympiacos	6	3	1	2	5	5	0	10	Transfer to UEFA Cup
4	(Spain) Deportivo La Coruña	6	0	2	4	0	9	−9	2	

15 September 2004 1	Liverpool (England)	2–0	(France) AS Monaco	Liverpool, England
20:45 CEST UTC+2	Cissé 22'; Gerrard (yellow card) 50'; Baroš 84'	Report	Zikos (yellow card) 16'; Givet (yellow card) 56'	Stadium: Anfield; Attendance: 33,517; Referee: Terje Hauge (Norway)

28 September 2004 2	AS Monaco (France)	2–0	(Spain) Deportivo La Coruña	Fontvieille, Monaco
20:45 CEST UTC+2	Kallon 5'; Saviola 10'; Evra (yellow card) 55'	Report	Andrade (yellow card) 34'; Sergio (yellow card) 36'	Stadium: Stade Louis II; Attendance: 13,673; Referee: Stefano Farina (Italy)

19 October 2004 3	AS Monaco (France)	2–1	(Greece) Olympiacos	Fontvieille, Monaco
20:45 CEST UTC+2	Saviola 3'; Chevantón 10'	Report	Okkas 60'; Venetidis (yellow card) 63'; Anatolakis (yellow card) 79'	Stadium: Stade Louis II; Attendance: 16,624; Referee: Jan Wegereef (Netherlands)

3 November 2004 4	Olympiacos (Greece)	1–0	(France) AS Monaco	Athens, Greece
20:45 CET UTC+1	Pantos (yellow card) 18'; Stoltidis (yellow card) 77'; Schürrer 84'; Georgatos (yellow card) 85'; Castillo (yellow card) 90'	Report	Plašil (yellow card) 52'; Evra (yellow card) 59'; Squillaci (yellow card) 63'	Stadium: Karaiskakis Stadium; Attendance: 33,000; Referee: Markus Merk (Germany)

23 November 2004 5	AS Monaco (France)	1–0	(England) Liverpool	Fontvieille, Monaco
20:45 CET UTC+1	Saviola 54'	Report	Traoré (yellow card) 41'; Hamann (yellow card) 45'; Warnock (yellow card) 81'	Stadium: Stade Louis II; Attendance: 15,000; Referee: Claus Bo Larsen (Denmark)

8 December 2004 6	Deportivo La Coruña (Spain)	0–5	(France) AS Monaco	A Coruña, Spain
20:45 CET UTC+1		Report	Chevantón 21'; Givet 35'; Saviola 38'; Maicon 54'; Adebayor 75'	Stadium: Estadio Riazor; Attendance: 16,000; Referee: Yuri Baskakov (Russia)

==== Knockout stage ====
===== Round of 16 =====
22 February 2005 First leg	PSV (Netherlands)	1–0	(France) AS Monaco	Eindhoven, Netherlands
20:45 CET UTC+1	Alex 8'; Vogel (yellow card) 38'	Report	Rodriguez (yellow card) 40'	Stadium: Philips Stadion; Attendance: 31,225; Referee: Luis Medina Cantalejo (Spain)

9 March 2005 Second leg	AS Monaco (France)	0–2 (0–3 agg.)	(Netherlands) PSV	Fontvieille, Monaco
20:45 CET UTC+1	Zikos (yellow card) 65'; Givet (red card) 76'; Maicon (yellow card) 81'; Chevantón (yellow card) 85'	Report	Vennegoor of Hesselink 26'; Van Bommel (yellow card) 31'; Lee (yellow card) 44'; Beasley 69'; Park (yellow card) 81'	Stadium: Stade Louis II; Attendance: 15,125; Referee: Steve Bennett (England)

== Statistics ==
=== Appearances and goals ===
No.	Pos	Nat	Player	Total		Ligue 1		Coupe de France		Coupe de la Ligue		UEFA Champions League	
No.	Pos	Nat	Player	Apps	Goals	Apps	Goals	Apps	Goals	Apps	Goals	Apps	Goals
1	GK	(France) FRA	Fabien Audard	7	0	4	0	3	0	0	0	0	0
3	DF	(France) FRA	Patrice Evra	46	0	35+1	0	1+1	0	0	0	8	0
4	DF	(France) FRA	François Modesto	34	1	19+9	1	3	0	0	0	1+2	0
5	MF	(Uruguay) URU	Diego Pérez	38	0	20+9	0	2+1	0	0	0	1+5	0
6	MF	(Czech Republic) CZE	Jaroslav Plašil	30	1	18+6	1	1	0	0	0	4+1	0
7	MF	(Argentina) ARG	Lucas Bernardi	30	1	23+1	1	1	0	0	0	5	0
8	FW	(Sierra Leone) SLE	Mohamed Kallon	44	11	28+7	10	1+1	0	0	0	7	1
9	FW	(Argentina) ARG	Javier Saviola	37	12	27+2	8	1	0	0	0	7	4
10	FW	(Uruguay) URU	Javier Chevantón	34	13	22+4	10	2	1	0	0	4+2	2
12	DF	(Italy) ITA	Joseph Dayo Oshadogan	4	0	0+1	0	3	0	0	0	0	0
13	DF	(Brazil) BRA	Maicon	39	5	30+1	4	1	0	0	0	7	1
15	MF	(Greece) GRE	Akis Zikos	40	0	31+1	0	0	0	0	0	8	0
16	GK	(France) FRA	André Biancarelli	1	0	0	0	0+1	0	0	0	0	0
17	MF	(France) FRA	Jimmy Juan	4	0	0+3	0	0	0	0	0	0+1	0
18	FW	(Democratic Republic of the Congo) COD	Shabani Nonda	15	1	3+7	0	2	0	0	0	1+2	1
19	DF	(France) FRA	Sébastien Squillaci	35	3	28	3	1	0	0	0	6	0
21	MF	(Sweden) SWE	Pontus Farnerud	34	1	12+12	1	4	0	0	0	3+3	0
22	FW	(France) FRA	David Gigliotti	9	1	1+5	1	2+1	0	0	0	0	0
24	FW	(Togo) TOG	Emmanuel Adebayor	46	12	29+5	9	2+2	3	0	0	5+3	0
25	FW	(Senegal) SEN	Souleymane Camara	13	1	3+7	1	2	0	0	0	0+1	0
27	DF	(France) FRA	Julien Rodriguez	27	2	16+2	2	3	0	0	0	6	0
30	GK	(Italy) ITA	Flavio Roma	43	0	34	0	1	0	0	0	8	0
31	DF	(France) FRA	Olivier Veigneau	3	1	0	0	3	1	0	0	0	0
32	DF	(France) FRA	Gaël Givet	43	1	33+1	0	2	0	0	0	7	1
34	MF	(France) FRA	Marko Muslin	1	0	0+1	0	0	0	0	0	0	0
35	MF	(Norway) NOR	Hassan El Fakiri	12	0	2+6	0	3	0	0	0	0+1	0
Players away from the club on loan:
Players who appeared for Monaco no longer at the club:

=== Goal scorers ===
Place	Position	Nation	Number	Name	Ligue 1	Coupe de la Ligue	Coupe de France	UEFA Champions League	Total
1	FW	(Uruguay)	10	Javier Chevantón	10	1		2	13
1	FW	(Togo)	24	Emmanuel Adebayor	9	3		1	13
3	FW	(Argentina)	9	Javier Saviola	8	0		4	12
4	FW	(Sierra Leone)	8	Mohamed Kallon	10	0		1	11
5	DF	(Brazil)	13	Maicon	4	0		1	5
6	DF	(France)	19	Sébastien Squillaci	3	0		0	3
7	DF	(France)	27	Julien Rodriguez	2	0		0	2
8	MF	(Sweden)	21	Pontus Farnerud	1	0		0	1
8	FW	(Senegal)	25	Souleymane Camara	1	0		0	1
8	MF	(Czech Republic)	6	Jaroslav Plašil	1	0		0	1
8	MF	(Argentina)	7	Lucas Bernardi	1	0		0	1
8	FW	(France)	22	David Gigliotti	1	0		0	1
8	DF	(France)	4	François Modesto	1	0		0	1
8	DF	(France)	31	Olivier Veigneau	0	1		0	1
8	DF	(France)	32	Gaël Givet	0	0		1	1
				TOTALS	52	5	13	10	80

=== Disciplinary record ===
Number	Nation	Position	Name	Ligue 1		Coupe de France		Coupe de la Ligue		UEFA Champions League		Total	
Number	Nation	Position	Name	Yellow card	Red card	Yellow card	Red card	Yellow card	Red card	Yellow card	Red card	Yellow card	Red card
1	(France)	GK	Fabien Audard	0	0	2	1			0	0	2	1
3	(France)	DF	Patrice Evra	10	1	0	0			2	0	12	1
4	(France)	DF	François Modesto	6	0	1	0			0	0	7	0
5	(Uruguay)	MF	Diego Pérez	7	1	0	0			0	0	8	1
6	(Czech Republic)	MF	Jaroslav Plašil	2	0	0	0			1	0	3	0
7	(Argentina)	MF	Lucas Bernardi	6	0	0	0			0	0	6	0
8	(Sierra Leone)	FW	Mohamed Kallon	6	0	1	0			0	0	7	0
9	(Argentina)	FW	Javier Saviola	0	0	1	0			0	0	1	0
10	(Uruguay)	FW	Javier Chevantón	7	0	0	0			1	0	8	0
12	(Italy)	DF	Joseph Dayo Oshadogan	1	0	1	0			0	0	2	0
13	(Brazil)	DF	Maicon	8	0	0	0			1	0	9	0
15	(Greece)	MF	Akis Zikos	13	0	0	0			2	0	15	0
17	(France)	MF	Jimmy Juan	1	0	0	0			0	0	1	0
19	(France)	DF	Sébastien Squillaci	4	0	0	0			1	0	5	0
21	(Sweden)	MF	Pontus Farnerud	2	0	0	0			0	0	2	0
22	(France)	FW	David Gigliotti	1	0	0	0			0	0	1	0
24	(Togo)	FW	Emmanuel Adebayor	2	1	0	0			0	0	2	1
25	(Senegal)	FW	Souleymane Camara	0	0	1	0			0	0	1	0
27	(France)	DF	Julien Rodriguez	5	1	0	0			1	0	6	1
30	(Italy)	GK	Flavio Roma	3	0	0	0			0	0	3	0
32	(France)	DF	Gaël Givet	5	0	1	0			1	1	7	1
35	(Norway)	DF	Hassan El Fakiri	1	0	0	0			0	0	1	0
			TOTALS	90	4	8	1			10	1	108	6
