= List of foreign Ligue 1 players: B =

This is a list of foreign players in the French Ligue 1, which commenced play in 1932. The following players must meet both of the following two criteria:

1. Have played at least one Ligue 1 game. Players who were signed by Ligue 1 clubs, but only played in lower league, cup and/or European games, or did not play in any competitive games at all, are not included.
2. Are considered foreign, i.e., outside France and its dependencies (Guadeloupe, Martinique, Reunion Island or French Polynesia), determined by the following:

A player is considered foreign if he is not eligible to play for the national teams of France.

More specifically,

- If a player has been capped on international level, the national team is used; if he has been capped by more than one country, the highest level (or the most recent) team is used. These include French players with dual citizenship. Players who played for France but came as foreign players (such as Miguel Ángel Lauri) are also listed.
- If a player has not been capped on international level, his country of birth is used, except those who were born abroad from French parents or moved to France at a young age, and those who clearly indicated to have switched his nationality to another nation.

Clubs listed are those that the player has played at least one Ligue 1 game for.

Seasons listed are those that the player has played at least one Ligue 1 game in. Note that seasons, not calendar years, are used. For example, "1992–95" indicates that the player has played in every season from 1992–93 to 1994–95, but not necessarily every calendar year from 1992 to 1995.

In bold: players still active in Ligue 1 and their respective teams in current season.

== Belarus ==
- Syarhey Chernik – Nancy – 2016–17
- Sergey Krivets – Metz – 2014–15

== Belgium ==
- Brandon Baiye – Clermont – 2022–23
- Michy Batshuayi – Marseille – 2014–16
- Roberto Bisconti – Nice – 2004–06
- **Arnaud Bodart** – Lille, **Le Havre** – 2025–
- Gilbert Bodart – Bordeaux – 1996–97
- Danny Boffin – Metz – 1997–2000
- Toni Brogno – Sedan – 2000–02
- Gust Brouwers – Excelsior Roubaix – 1934–36
- Christian Brüls – Nice, Rennes – 2013–15
- Gianni Bruno – Lille, Bastia, Evian, Lorient – 2011–15
- Vincent Burlet – Lille – 2025–26
- Maxime Busi – Reims – 2021–24
- Yannick Carrasco – Monaco – 2013–15
- Maximiliano Caufriez – Clermont – 2022–24
- Jürgen Cavens – Marseille – 2001–02
- Nacer Chadli – Monaco – 2018–19
- Laurent Ciman – Dijon – 2018–19
- **Thibault De Smet** – Reims, **Paris FC** – 2020–21, 2022–
- Eric Deflandre – Lyon – 2000–04
- Brecht Dejaegere – Toulouse – 2022–23
- Stéphane Demol – Toulouse – 1990–91
- Jason Denayer – Lyon – 2018–22
- Philippe Desmet – Lille – 1986–89
- Brandon Deville – AC Ajaccio – 2013–14
- Jérémy Doku – Rennes – 2020–24
- Grégory Dufer – Caen – 2004–05
- Steve Dugardein – Caen – 2004–05
- **Julien Duranville** – **Lyon** – 2026–
- Yassine El Ghanassy – Nantes – 2017–18
- Renaud Emond – Nantes – 2019–22
- Björn Engels – Reims – 2018–19
- Wout Faes – Reims, Monaco – 2020–22, 2025–26
- Matias Fernandez-Pardo – Lille – 2024–26
- Malick Fofana – Lyon – 2023–27
- Thomas Foket – Reims – 2018–24
- Guillaume Gillet – SC Bastia, Nantes – 2014–17
- Roland Godart – CO Roubaix-Tourcoing – 1950–52
- **Mika Godts** – **Paris SG** – 2026–
- Fernand Goyvaerts – Nice – 1968–69, 1970–71
- Baptiste Guillaume – Lens, Lille, Angers, Nîmes – 2014–16, 2017–19
- Eden Hazard – Lille – 2007–12
- **Thorgan Hazard** – **Lens** – 2026–
- **Stanis Idumbo** – **Monaco** – 2025–
- Nordin Jbari – Troyes – 1999–2001
- Christophe Kinet – Strasbourg – 1997–99
- Victor Klonaridis – Lille – 2012–13
- Roland Lamah – Le Mans – 2008–10
- Christophe Lauwers – Toulouse – 1998–99
- Dominique Lemoine – Mulhouse – 1989–90
- Philippe Léonard – Monaco, Nice – 1996–2004
- Aaron Leya Iseka – Marseille, Toulouse, Metz – 2016–17, 2018–21
- Anthony Limbombe – Nantes – 2018–21
- Dodi Lukebakio – Toulouse – 2016–17
- Orel Mangala – Lyon – 2023–26
- Eliot Matazo – Monaco – 2020–25
- Noam Mayoka-Tika – Marseille – 2023–24
- **Noah Mbamba** – **Lorient** – 2026–
- Isaac Mbenza – Montpellier, Amiens – 2016–18, 2019–20
- Thomas Meunier – Paris SG, Lille – 2016–20, 2024–26
- Robert Meuris – CO Roubaix-Tourcoing, AS Monaco, Nîmes Olympique – 1947–52, 1953–55
- Raphaël Miceli – Strasbourg, Le Havre – 1997–2000
- Kevin Mirallas – Lille, Saint-Étienne – 2004–10
- Diego Moreira – Lyon, Strasbourg – 2023–26
- **Nathan Ngoy** – **Lille** – 2025–
- **Samuel Nibombé** – **Monaco** – 2025–
- **Joseph Nonge** – **Brest** – 2026–
- Kazeem Olaigbe – Rennes – 2024–25
- Amadou Onana – Lille – 2021–22
- **Loïs Openda** – Lens, **Lyon** – 2022–23, 2026–
- Divock Origi – Lille – 2012–14
- Stef Peeters – Caen – 2017–19
- Mike Penders – Strasbourg – 2025–26
- **Arthur Piedfort** – **Auxerre** – 2026–
- Luigi Pieroni – Auxerre, Nantes, Lens, Valenciennes – 2004–10
- Thierry Pister – Toulon – 1989–90
- Gaston Plovie – Excelsior Roubaix, RC Roubaix, Sète – 1932–35, 1936–38
- David Pollet – Lens – 2007–08, 2010–11
- Pascal Renier – Troyes – 1999–2001
- Rubenilson – Nice – 1996–97
- Enzo Scifo – Bordeaux, Auxerre, Monaco – 1988–91, 1993–97
- Matz Sels – Strasbourg – 2018–24
- **Ayanda Sishuba** – Lens, **Rennes** – 2023–
- Lucas Stassin – Saint-Étienne – 2024–25
- Benoît Thans – Lens – 1987–89
- Arthur Theate – Rennes – 2022–24
- Youri Tielemans – Monaco – 2017–19
- Daniel Van Buyten – Marseille – 2001–03
- Leo Van der Elst – Metz – 1988–89
- Gunter Van Handenhoven – Metz – 1998–2002
- Joseph Van Mol – Nice – 1961–64, 1965–68
- Anthony Vanden Borre – Montpellier – 2016–17
- Erwin Vandenbergh – Lille – 1986–90
- Erwin Vandendaele – Reims – 1977–78
- Mike Vanhamel – Le Havre – 2008–09
- Charles Vanhoutte – Nice – 2025–26
- Franky Vercauteren – Nantes – 1987–90
- Julien Vercauteren – Nice – 2014–15
- Arthur Vermeeren – Marseille – 2025–26
- Patrick Vervoort – Bordeaux – 1990–91
- Eddy Voordeckers – Rennes – 1985–87
- Marc Wilmots – Bordeaux – 2000–01
- **Axel Witsel** – **Nice** – 2026–
- Laurent Wuillot – Ajaccio – 2002–03

== Benin ==
- Khaled Adénon – Le Mans, Amiens – 2008–09, 2017–19
- Jordan Adéoti – Caen – 2014–17
- Jean-Marc Adjovi-Bocco – Lens – 1991–97
- Yannick Aguemon – Toulouse – 2011–12
- Mattéo Ahlinvi – Nîmes – 2020–21
- Saturnin Allagbé – Dijon – 2020–21
- Sessi D'Almeida – Bordeaux – 2014–15
- Laurent D'Jaffo – Montpellier – 1991–95
- David Djigla – Bordeaux – 2014–15
- Jodel Dossou – Clermont – 2021–23
- Rudy Gestede – Metz – 2007–08
- Cédric Hountondji – Rennes, Clermont, Angers – 2013–14, 2021–23, 2024–25
- Emmanuel Imorou – Caen – 2014–17, 2018–19
- Steve Mounié – Montpellier, Brest – 2015–17, 2020–24
- Mickaël Poté – Nice – 2009–12
- Stéphane Sessègnon – Le Mans, Paris SG, Montpellier – 2006–11, 2016–18
- Oumar Tchomogo – Guingamp – 2003–04
- Jonathan Tinhan – Grenoble, Montpellier, Troyes – 2009–10, 2011–14, 2017–18
- **Aiyegun Tosin** – **Lorient** – 2023–24, 2025–
- Olivier Verdon – Bordeaux – 2017–18

== Bosnia and Herzegovina ==
- Anel Ahmedhodžić – Bordeaux – 2021–22
- Boško Antić – Angers – 1972–75
- Alen Bajkuša – Caen – 1996–97
- Mehmed Baždarević – Sochaux – 1988–95
- Boban Božović – Lens – 1991–92
- **Nidal Čelik** – **Lens** – 2025–
- Adnan Čustović – Le Havre – 1998–2000
- Amar Dedić – Marseille – 2024–25
- Esad Dugalić – Saint-Étienne – 1976–77
- Haris Duljević – Nîmes – 2019–21
- Vinko Golob – Toulouse FC (1937) – 1948–49
- Faruk Hadžibegić – Sochaux – 1988–95
- Vahid Halilhodžić – Nantes, Paris SG – 1981–87
- Said Hamulić – Toulouse – 2022–23
- Vedad Ibišević – Paris SG – 2004–05
- Dragan Jakovljević – Nantes – 1989–91
- Božidar Janković – Metz – 1981–82
- Josip Katalinski – Nice – 1975–78
- Sead Kolašinac – Marseille – 2022–23
- Muhamed Konjić – Monaco – 1998–99
- Petar Manola – Red Star – 1947–48
- Mirza Mešić – Nantes – 1999–2000
- Danijel Milićević – Metz – 2017–18
- Muhamed Mujić – Bordeaux – 1962–63
- Vahidin Musemić – Nice – 1974–76
- Džemaludin Mušović – Valenciennes – 1976–77
- Simo Nikolić – Lyon – 1980–83
- Ivica Osim – Strasbourg, Sedan, Valenciennes – 1970–71, 1972–74, 1975–76, 1977–78
- Miralem Pjanić – Metz, Lyon – 2007–08, 2008–11
- Sanjin Prcić - Sochaux, Rennes, Strasbourg – 2013–15, 2016–24
- Boro Primorac – Lille, Cannes – 1983–86, 1987–90
- Halid Šabanović – Angers – 2022–23
- Alen Škoro – Marseille – 2000–01
- Blaž Slišković – Marseille, Lens, Mulhouse, Rennes – 1986–87, 1988–90, 1991–92
- Edhem Šljivo – Nice – 1981–82
- Emir Spahić – Montpellier – 2009–10
- Safet Sušić – Paris SG – 1982–91
- Mirza Varešanović – Bordeaux – 1995–96

== Brazil ==
- **Abner** – **Lyon** – 2024–
- Adaílton (Adaílton da Silva Santos) – AS Nancy – 2005–08
- Adaílton (Adaílton José dos Santos Filho) – Rennes – 2004–06
- Adaílton (Adaílton Martins Bolzan) – Paris SG – 1998–99
- Adeílson – Nice – 2008–09
- Adriano – Monaco – 2007–11
- Adryan – Nantes – 2015–16
- Adryelson – Lyon – 2023–25
- Adson – Nantes – 2023–24
- Airton – Stade Français – 1966–67
- Alex (Alex Dias de Almeida) – Saint-Étienne, Paris SG – 1999–2002
- Alex (Alex Rodrigo Dias da Costa) – Paris SG – 2011–14
- **Alexsandro** – **Lille** – 2022–
- Aloísio – Saint-Étienne, Paris SG – 1999–2003
- Dani Alves – Paris SG – 2017–19
- Yeso Amalfi – Nice, RC Paris, Marseille – 1950–51, 1954–56, 1957–58
- Leandro Amaral – Istres – 2004–05
- Anderson – Lyon – 2007–08
- Elinton Andrade – Marseille – 2009–12
- André Luís – Marseille – 2005–06
- André Luiz (André Luiz Moreira) – Marseille, Paris SG, Ajaccio – 2001–03, 2004–06
- André Luiz (André Luiz Silva do Nascimento) – AS Nancy – 2005–13
- Ângelo Gabriel – Strasbourg – 2023–24
- Antônio Carlos – Ajaccio – 2005–06
- Assis – Montpellier – 2001–02
- Danilo Avelar – Amiens – 2017–18
- Baltazar – Rennes – 1991–92
- Danilo Barbosa – Nice – 2018–22
- Michel Bastos – Lille, Lyon – 2006–13
- César Belli – Paris SG, Rennes – 1999–2002
- **Lucas Beraldo** – **Paris SG** – 2023–
- Bolívar – Monaco – 2006–08
- António Borges – Cannes, Antibes – 1935–36, 1938–39
- Neto Borges – Clermont – 2022–24
- Gabriel Boschilia – Monaco, Nantes – 2015–20
- Abel Braga – Paris SG – 1979–81
- Brandão – Marseille, Saint-Étienne, Bastia – 2008–16
- Brandãozinho – Nice – 1953–56
- Claudio Caçapa – Lyon – 2000–07
- Jonathan Cafu – Bordeaux – 2017–18
- Caio Henrique – Monaco – 2020–26
- Flávio Camargo – Bastia – 1994–95
- Joel Camargo – Paris SG – 1971–72
- Diogo Campos – Evian – 2012–13
- Carlão – Sochaux – 2008–14
- Carlos Eduardo – Nice – 2014–15
- Carlos Henrique – Bordeaux – 2005–14
- Carlos Vinícius – Monaco – 2018–19
- Matheus Carvalho – Monaco – 2014–15
- Ceará – Paris SG – 2007–12
- Christian – Paris SG, Bordeaux – 1999–2002
- Eduardo Costa – Bordeaux, Marseille, AS Monaco – 2001–05, 2009–10
- Cris – Lyon – 2004–12
- Cuca – Saint-Étienne – 1995–96
- Dalbert – Nice, Rennes – 2016–17, 2020–21
- Dante – Lille, Nice – 2003–05, 2016–26
- David Luiz – Paris SG – 2014–16
- Deivid – Bordeaux – 2003–04
- Denílson – Bordeaux – 2005–06
- Diego Carlos – Nantes – 2016–19
- Dill – Marseille – 2001–02
- Dória – Marseille – 2016–18
- Douglão – Nantes – 2008–09
- Douglas Augusto – Nantes – 2023–25
- Dudu Cearense – Rennes – 2004–06
- Ederson – Nice, Lyon – 2004–12
- Edmílson (Edmílson Gomes) – Lyon – 2001–04
- Edmílson (Edmílson Gonçalves) – Paris SG – 1997–98
- Edson (Edson Luís da Silva) – Marseille – 1998–99
- Édson (Édson Marcelo de Faria Manfron) – Ajaccio – 2004–06
- Eduardo (Eduardo Adelino da Silva) – Toulouse FC – 2003–05
- Eduardo (Eduardo Ribeiro dos Santos) – Lens, Ajaccio – 2009–14
- Emerson (Emerson da Conceição) – Lille – 2006–11
- Emerson (Emerson Ricardo Otacilio) – Lorient – 1998–99
- Emersonn – Toulouse – 2025–26
- Endrick – Lyon – 2025–26
- Everson – Nice – 2002–04
- Fabinho (Fábio Alves Félix) – Toulouse FC – 2006–07
- Fabinho (Fábio Henrique Tavares) – Monaco – 2013–18
- Fábio – Nantes – 2018–22
- Faustinho – Sedan – 1961–62
- Fernandão – Marseille, Toulouse FC – 2001–04
- Fernando Cônsul Fernandes – Valenciennes – 1967–68
- Demetrius Ferreira – AS Nancy, Bastia, Marseille, Troyes – 1998–2007
- Francisco Filho – Nîmes Olympique – 1966–67
- Fransérgio – Bordeaux – 2021–22
- Fred – Lyon – 2005–09
- Adriano Gabiru – Marseille – 2000–01
- Gabriel – Lille, Troyes – 2016–20
- Ganso – Amiens – 2018–19
- Géder – Le Mans – 2008–10
- Geninho – Bastia – 1970–71
- Geraldo – Paris SG – 1991–92
- Gerson – Marseille – 2021–23
- Gil – Valenciennes – 2011–12
- Giovane Élber – Lyon – 2003–04
- Andrei Girotto – Nantes – 2017–23
- Fernando Giudicelli – Antibes – 1935–36
- Ricardo Gomes – Paris SG – 1991–95
- Grafite – Le Mans – 2006–07
- Gralak – Bordeaux – 1996–98
- Bruno Guimarães – Lyon – 2019–22
- Hélder – Nancy – 2008–09, 2011–13
- Henrique – Lyon – 2021–24
- Hernani – Saint-Étienne – 2017–18
- Vitorino Hilton – Bastia, Lens, Marseille, Montpellier – 2003–21
- Ilan – Sochaux, Saint-Étienne, Ajaccio, Bastia – 2004–09, 2011–14
- Isaias – Metz – 1995–97
- Ismaily – Lille – 2022–25
- Jaguaré – Marseille – 1936–39
- Jairzinho – Marseille – 1974–75
- Léo Jardim – Lille – 2021–23
- Jean Lucas – Lyon, Brest, Monaco – 2019–23
- Jeffinho – Lyon – 2022–24
- Jemerson – Monaco, Metz – 2015–20, 2021–22
- Jeovânio – Valenciennes – 2006–09
- João Victor – Nantes – 2022–23
- Jorge – Monaco – 2016–18
- Jubal – Auxerre – 2022–23, 2024–25
- Júlio César – Brest, Montpellier – 1986–90
- Juninho – Lyon – 2001–09
- Jussiê – Lens, Bordeaux – 2005–16
- Kim – AS Nancy – 2005–08
- Leonardo – Paris SG – 1996–98
- Ruan Levine – Ajaccio – 2022–23
- Lucas Lima – Nantes – 2016–19
- Renan Lodi – Marseille – 2023–24
- Luan – Toulouse – 2009–10
- Lucas Evangelista – Nantes – 2018–19
- Lucas – Rennes – 2000–02
- Luís Fabiano – Rennes – 2000–02
- Luís Henrique (Luís Henrique Pereira dos Santos) – Monaco – 1992–94
- Luis Henrique (Luís Henrique Tomaz de Lima) – Marseille – 2020–22, 2023–25
- Luiz Alberto – Saint-Étienne – 2000–01
- Luiz Araújo – Lille – 2017–21
- Luiz Gustavo – Marseille – 2017–20
- Luizinho – Nîmes Olympique, Montpellier – 1974–82
- Thiago Maia – Lille – 2017–20
- Maicon – AS Monaco – 2004–06
- Malcom – Bordeaux – 2015–18
- Wallyson Mallmann – Nice – 2015–16
- Fernando Marçal – Guingamp, Lyon – 2016–20
- Marcelinho (Marcelo dos Santos) – Marseille – 2000–01
- Marcelinho (Marcelo Pereira Surcin) – Ajaccio – 2004–05
- Marcelo – Lyon – 1993–97
- Marcelo – Lyon, Bordeaux – 2017–22
- Marcos António – Auxerre – 2007–08
- Marcos Paulo – Le Mans – 2008–09
- Mariano – Bordeaux – 2011–15
- Marlon – Nice – 2017–18
- **Marquinhos (Marcos Aoás Corrêa)** – **Paris SG** – 2013–
- Marquinhos (Marcus Vinicius Oliveira Alencar) – Nantes – 2023–24
- Armando da Silva Martins – Lens – 1952–54
- William Matheus – Toulouse FC – 2014–16
- Maxwell – Paris SG – 2012–17
- Túlio de Melo – Le Mans, Lille OSC, Evian – 2005–14
- Thiago Mendes – Lille, Lyon – 2017–23
- Fernando Menegazzo – Bordeaux – 2005–11
- Miranda – Sochaux – 2005–06
- Paulo Miranda – Bordeaux – 2001–02, 2003–04
- Gabriel Moscardo – Reims – 2024–25
- Walquir Mota – Lille OSC – 1992–94
- Lucas Moura – Paris SG – 2012–18
- Rafael Moura – Lorient – 2007–08
- Carlos Mozer – Marseille – 1989–92
- Naldo – Monaco – 2018–19
- Nathan – Amiens – 2017–18
- Nenê – Monaco, Paris SG – 2007–13
- Neymar – Paris SG – 2017–23
- Nilmar – Lyon – 2004–05
- Nivaldo – Saint-Étienne – 2007–08
- Vicente Nola – Saint-Étienne – 1951–53
- Magno Novaes – Bastia, Valenciennes – 2012–14
- Eduardo Oliveira – Sedan – 1999-01
- Valeriano de Oliveira – RC Lens – 1993–94
- Oswaldinho – Saint-Étienne – 1951–52
- Otávio (Otávio Henrique Santos) – Bordeaux – 2017–22
- **Otávio (Otávio Ataide da Silva)** – **Paris FC** – 2025–
- Pablo – Bordeaux – 2015–16, 2017–21
- **Igor Paixão** – **Marseille** – 2025–
- Lucas Paquetá – Lyon – 2020–22
- Paulão – Saint-Étienne – 2011–12
- Paulo André – Le Mans – 2006–09
- Paulo César (Paulo César Arruda Parente) – Paris SG, Toulouse FC – 2002–09
- Paulo César (Paulo César Lima) – Marseille – 1974–75
- Pedro Henrique – Rennes – 2014–17
- Pena – Strasbourg – 2002–03
- Lucas Pereira – Ajaccio – 2004–06
- Matheus Pereira – Dijon – 2019–20
- Luan Peres – Marseille – 2021–22
- Lucas Perri – Lyon – 2024–25
- Constantino Pires – Nîmes Olympique, Marseille, Lyon – 1951–65
- Pita – Strasbourg – 1988–89
- Plinio – Bordeaux – 1969–70
- Rafael – Lyon – 2015–20
- Rafinha – Paris SG – 2020–22
- Raí – Paris SG – 1993–98
- Raphinha – Rennes – 2019–21
- Rafael Ratão – Toulouse – 2022–23
- Reinaldo – Paris SG – 2003–05
- Thiago Ribeiro – Bordeaux – 2004–05
- Ricardinho – Bordeaux – 1997–98
- Diego Rigonato – Reims – 2012–16
- Rincón – Troyes – 2012–13, 2015–16
- Robson Bambu – Nice – 2020–21
- Rodrigo – Ajaccio, Strasbourg – 2003–06, 2007–08
- Ronaldinho – Paris SG – 2001–03
- Rubens – Caen – 1991–92
- Carlos Ruiter – Bordeaux, AS Monaco – 1966–72, 1973–74
- Felipe Saad – Evian, AC Ajaccio, Caen – 2011–13, 2014–15
- Álvaro Santos – Sochaux, Strasbourg – 2006–08
- Andrey Santos – Strasbourg – 2023–25
- Éverton Santos – Paris SG – 2007–08
- Fábio Santos (Fábio dos Santos Barbosa) – Lyon – 2007–09
- Fábio Santos (Fábio Santos Romeu) – AS Monaco – 2007–08
- Márcio Santos – Bordeaux – 1992–94
- Sávio – Bordeaux – 2002–03
- Rafael Schmitz – Lille, Valenciennes – 2001–07, 2008–12
- Severo – Lens – 1952–54
- Célio Silva – Caen – 1993–94
- Gabriel Silva – Saint-Étienne – 2017–22
- Igor Silva – Lorient – 2021–24, 2025–26
- Lucas Silva – Marseille – 2015–16
- Thiago Silva – Paris SG – 2012–20
- Somália – Toulouse – 2015–18
- Sonny Anderson – Marseille, AS Monaco, Lyon – 1993–97, 1999–2003
- Souza – Paris SG – 2007–08
- Tetê – Lyon – 2021–23
- Thiago Xavier – Troyes – 2012–13, 2015–16
- Matheus Thuler – Montpellier – 2021–22
- Vágner Love – Monaco – 2015–16
- Valdeir – Bordeaux – 1992–95
- Valdo – Paris SG – 1991–95
- Vampeta – Paris SG – 2000–01
- Vander – Rennes – 2000–01
- **Vanderson** – **Monaco** – 2021–
- Matheus Vivian – Metz, Guingamp – 2007–08, 2013–14
- Wallace – AS Monaco – 2014–16
- Weldon – Sochaux, Troyes – 2005–07
- Wendel – Bordeaux – 2006–11
- William – Bastia – 1995–96
- Agostinho Zara – Saint-Étienne – 1951–52
- Zé Alcino – AS Nancy – 1999–2000
- Nélson Zeglio – Sochaux, CO Roubaix-Tourcoing – 1951–53, 1954–55

== Bulgaria ==
- Dimitri Antonov – CO Roubaix-Tourcoing, Sète – 1947–51, 1953–55
- Dimitar Berbatov – Monaco – 2013–15
- Georgi Dimitrov – Saint-Étienne – 1986–88
- Emil Gargorov – Strasbourg – 2007–08
- Nikolay Iliev – Rennes – 1994–95
- Georgi Ivanov – Rennes – 2002–04
- Yordan Letchkov – Marseille – 1996–97
- Vladimir Manchev – Lille – 2002–04
- Plamen Markov – Metz – 1985–87
- Penko Rafailov – Strasbourg – 1937–38
- Nasko Sirakov – Lens – 1992–93
- Georgi Slavkov – Saint-Étienne – 1986–87
- Nikolay Todorov – Montpellier – 1991–92
- Boycho Velichkov – Le Havre – 1986–87
- Hristo Yanev – Grenoble – 2008–09
- Andrey Zhelyazkov – Strasbourg – 1985–86

== Burkina Faso ==
- Habib Bamogo – Montpellier, Marseille, Nantes, Nice – 2001–05, 2006–11
- Mamady Bangré – Toulouse – 2023–24
- Cyrille Bayala – Ajaccio – 2022–23
- **Martin Bley** – **Lorient** – 2025–
- Kouamé Botué – Ajaccio – 2022–23
- Abdoulaye Cissé – Montpellier – 2001–04
- Henoch Conombo – Bastia – 2004–05
- Bryan Dabo – Montpellier, Saint-Étienne – 2009–10, 2012–18
- Moumouni Dagano – Guingamp, Sochaux – 2003–04, 2005–08
- Lohann Doucet – Nantes, Paris FC – 2021–23, 2025–26
- Charles Kaboré – Marseille – 2007–13
- Issa Kaboré – Troyes, Marseille – 2021–23
- Hervé Koffi – Lille, Lens, Angers – 2017–18, 2024–26
- **Hillel Konaté** – **Troyes** – 2026–
- Bakary Koné – Lyon, Strasbourg – 2011–16, 2017–18
- Djakaridja Koné – Evian – 2012–15
- **Arsène Kouassi** – **Lorient** – 2025–
- Anthony Koura – Nancy – 2016–17
- Préjuce Nakoulma – Nantes – 2016–18
- Abou Ouattara – Lille – 2019–20
- Dango Ouattara – Lorient – 2021–23
- Issicka Ouattara – Angers, Mulhouse, Strasbourg – 1974–75, 1976–77, 1982–84
- Hermann Ouédraogo – Istres – 2004–05
- **Mohamed Ouédraogo** – **Lyon** – 2026–
- Fadil Sido – Metz – 2014–15
- Alain Traoré – Auxerre, Lorient, Monaco – 2006–16
- Bertrand Traoré – Lyon – 2017–20
- Steeve Yago – Toulouse – 2012–18
- Arthur Zagré – Paris SG, Dijon – 2019–21

== Burundi ==
- **Youssouf Ndayishimiye** – **Nice** – 2022–
- Saidi Ntibazonkiza – Caen – 2015–16

== References and notes ==
=== Books ===
- Barreaud, Marc (1998). Dictionnaire des footballeurs étrangers du championnat professionnel français (1932-1997). L'Harmattan, Paris. ISBN 2-7384-6608-7.
- Tamás Dénes; Pál Peterdi; Zoltán Rochy; József Selmeci (1999). Kalandozó magyar labdarúgók. ISBN 963-85967-0-8.

=== Club pages ===
- AJ Auxerre former players
- AJ Auxerre former players
- Girondins de Bordeaux former players
- Girondins de Bordeaux former players
- Les ex-Tangos (joueurs), Stade Lavallois former players
- Olympique Lyonnais former players
- Olympique de Marseille former players
- FC Metz former players
- AS Monaco FC former players
- Ils ont porté les couleurs de la Paillade... Montpellier HSC Former players
- AS Nancy former players
- FC Nantes former players
- Paris SG former players
- Red Star Former players
- Red Star former players
- Stade de Reims former players
- Stade Rennais former players
- CO Roubaix-Tourcoing former players
- AS Saint-Étienne former players
- Sporting Toulon Var former players

=== Others ===
- stat2foot
- footballenfrance
- French Clubs' Players in European Cups 1955-1995, RSSSF
- Finnish players abroad, RSSSF
- Italian players abroad, RSSSF
- Romanians who played in foreign championships
- Swiss players in France, RSSSF
- EURO 2008 CONNECTIONS: FRANCE, Stephen Byrne Bristol Rovers official site

== Notes ==
1. Born in Austria
2. Born in Brazil
3. Born in Cameroon
4. Born in Croatia (then part of SFR Yugoslavia)
5. Born in France
6. Born in Germany
7. Born in Ivory Coast
8. Born in Democratic Republic of Congo (then Zaire)
9. Born in Mauritania
10. Born in the Netherlands
11. Born in Nigeria
12. Born in Senegal
13. Born in Sweden
14. Born in Switzerland
15. Capped for the DR Congo national football team
16. Capped for the France national under-21 football team
17. Capped for the France national under-20 football team
18. Capped for the France national under-19 football team
19. Capped for the France national under-18 football team
20. Capped for the France national under-17 football team
21. Capped for the France national under-16 football team
22. Capped for the Germany national under-20 football team
23. Capped for the Germany national under-19 football team
24. Capped for the Germany national under-18 football team
25. Capped for the Ivory Coast national under-19 football team
26. Capped for the Ivory Coast national under-17 football team
27. Capped for the Luxembourg national under-19 football team
28. Capped for the Luxembourg national under-17 football team
29. Capped for the Morocco national football team
30. Capped for the Portugal national under-21 football team
31. Capped for the Portugal national under-20 football team
32. Capped for the Portugal national under-19 football team
33. Capped for the Portugal national under-18 football team
34. Capped for the Portugal national under-16 football team
35. Capped for the Spain national under-19 football team
36. Capped for the Spain national under-17 football team
37. Capped for the Spain national under-16 football team
38. Capped for the Sweden men's national football team
39. Capped for the Sweden national under-21 football team
40. Capped for the Sweden men's national under-19 football team
41. Capped for the Sweden men's national under-17 football team
42. Capped for the Switzerland national under-21 football team
43. Capped for the Switzerland national under-20 football team
44. Capped for the Switzerland national under-19 football team
