= 2007–08 AS Monaco FC season =

AS Monaco
2007–08 season
- President: Michel Pastor
- Head coach: Ricardo Gomes
- Stadium: Stade Louis II
- Ligue 1: 12th
- Coupe de la Ligue: Round of 16 (vs. Lens)
- Coupe de France: Round of 32 (vs. Marseille)
- Top goalscorer: League: Ludovic Giuly; Frédéric Piquionne (7 each); All: Frédéric Piquionne (8)
- Average home league attendance: 10,570
Home colours

The 2007–08 season was AS Monaco FC's 51st season in Ligue 1. They finished twelfth in Ligue 1, and were knocked out of the Coupe de la Ligue by Lens, at the Round of 16, and the Coupe de France by Marseille at the Round of 32.

Ricardo Gomes was appointed as coach at the beginning of the season, replacing Laurent Banide.

== Squad ==
Note: Flags indicate national team as defined under FIFA eligibility rules; some limited exceptions apply. Players may hold more than one non-FIFA nationality.

No.	Pos.	Nation	Player
1	GK	MON	Manuel Vallaurio
2	DF	FRA	Sylvain Monsoreau
3	DF	FRA	Jérémy Berthod
4	DF	FRA	François Modesto
5	MF	URU	Diego Pérez
6	MF	CRO	Nikola Pokrivač
7	MF	ARG	Lucas Bernardi
8	MF	ARG	Sergio Almirón (loan from Juventus)
10	FW	FRA	Jérémy Ménez
11	MF	BRA	Nenê
12	DF	BRA	Adriano
13	DF	FRA	Vincent Muratori
14	MF	FRA	Malaury Martin
15	FW	BRA	Fábio Santos (loan from São Paulo)
16	GK	FRA	Stéphane Ruffier

No.	Pos.	Nation	Player
17	MF	FRA	Serge Gakpe
18	FW	FRA	Frédéric Piquionne
20	MF	URU	Nacho González (loan from Danubio)
21	MF	FRA	Camel Meriem
22	DF	BRA	Bolívar
23	MF	CRO	Jerko Leko
24	DF	COD	Cédric Mongongu
25	DF	ARG	Leandro Cufré
26	DF	SEN	Massamba Sambou
27	DF	FRA	Arnaud Lescure
28	MF	FRA	Djamel Bakar
30	GK	ITA	Flavio Roma
33	FW	FRA	Steve Pinau
34	MF	FRA	Distel Zola
—	DF	GER	Torben Joneleit

=== Out on loan ===
Note: Flags indicate national team as defined under FIFA eligibility rules; some limited exceptions apply. Players may hold more than one non-FIFA nationality.

No.	Pos.	Nation	Player
—	MF	FRA	Thomas Mangani (at Ajaccio)
—	FW	COL	Juan Pablo Pino (at Charleroi)
—	FW	FRA	Lanteri Laurent (at Legano)

No.	Pos.	Nation	Player
—	FW	FRA	Alexandre Licata (at Bastia)
—	FW	FRA	Frédéric Nimani (at Sedan)
—	FW	URU	Gonzalo Vargas (at Sochaux)

== Transfers ==
=== Summer ===
In: Note: Flags indicate national team as defined under FIFA eligibility rules; some limited exceptions apply. Players may hold more than one non-FIFA nationality.

No.	Pos.	Nation	Player
3	DF	FRA	Jérémy Berthod (from (France) Lyon)
11	MF	BRA	Nenê (from (Spain) Celta Vigo)
12	DF	BRA	Adriano (from (Italy) Atalanta)
18	FW	FRA	Frédéric Piquionne (from (France) Saint-Étienne, previously on loan)

Out: Note: Flags indicate national team as defined under FIFA eligibility rules; some limited exceptions apply. Players may hold more than one non-FIFA nationality.

No.	Pos.	Nation	Player
1	GK	FRA	Guillaume Warmuz (Retired)
3	DF	FRA	Manuel dos Santos (to (France) Strasbourg)
6	MF	CZE	Jaroslav Plašil (to (Spain) Osasuna)
8	MF	ESP	Gerard (to (Spain) Recreativo Huelva)
15	MF	CIV	Yaya Touré (to (Spain) Barcelona)
18	FW	SLE	Mohamed Kallon
19	FW	URU	Gonzalo Vargas (loan to (France) Sochaux)
27	FW	FRA	Frédéric Nimani (loan to (France) Lorient)
32	DF	FRA	Gaël Givet (to (France) Marseille)
—	DF	GER	Torben Joneleit (loan to (Scotland) Hibernian)
—	MF	FRA	Thomas Mangani (loan to (France) Ajaccio)
—	FW	FRA	Lanteri Laurent (loan to (Italy) Legano)
—	FW	FRA	Alexandre Licata (loan to (France) Gueugnon)

=== Winter ===
In: Note: Flags indicate national team as defined under FIFA eligibility rules; some limited exceptions apply. Players may hold more than one non-FIFA nationality.

No.	Pos.	Nation	Player
6	MF	CRO	Nikola Pokrivač (from (Croatia) Dinamo Zagreb)
8	MF	ARG	Sergio Almirón (loan from (Italy) Juventus)
20	MF	URU	Nacho González (loan from (Uruguay) Danubio)
—	DF	GER	Torben Joneleit (loan return from (Scotland) Hibernian)

Out: Note: Flags indicate national team as defined under FIFA eligibility rules; some limited exceptions apply. Players may hold more than one non-FIFA nationality.

No.	Pos.	Nation	Player
9	FW	CZE	Jan Koller (to (Germany) 1. FC Nürnberg)
15	DF	FRA	Olivier Veigneau (to (Germany) Duisburg)
20	FW	COL	Juan Pablo Pino (loan to (Belgium) Charleroi)
27	FW	FRA	Frédéric Nimani (loan to (France) Sedan, previously on loan to (France) Lorient)

== Competitions ==
=== Ligue 1 ===
==== League table ====
Pos	Team	Pld	W	D	L	GF	GA	GD	Pts
10	Lorient	38	12	16	10	32	35	−3	52
11	Caen	38	13	12	13	48	53	−5	51
12	Monaco	38	13	8	17	40	48	−8	47
13	Valenciennes	38	12	9	17	42	40	+2	45
14	Sochaux	38	10	14	14	34	43	−9	44

Source: Ligue 1
Rules for classification: 1) points; 2) goal difference; 3) number of goals scored.

==== Results summary ====
Overall								Home						Away					
Pld	W	D	L	GF	GA	GD	Pts	W	D	L	GF	GA	GD	W	D	L	GF	GA	GD
38	13	8	17	40	48	−8	47	7	5	7	22	24	−2	6	3	10	18	24	−6

Last updated: 31 March 2015.
Source: Soccerway

==== Results by round ====
Round	1	2	3	4	5	6	7	8	9	10	11	12	13	14	15	16	17	18	19	20	21	22	23	24	25	26	27	28	29	30	31	32	33	34	35	36	37	38
Ground	H	A	H	A	H	A	A	H	A	H	A	H	A	H	A	H	A	H	A	H	A	H	A	H	H	A	H	A	H	A	H	A	H	A	H	A	H	A
Result	D	L	W	W	W	W	L	L	L	L	L	D	W	W	D	D	L	W	L	W	W	W	L	D	L	D	D	L	L	L	L	W	L	W	L	D	W	L
Position	7	14	8	4	3	1	4	6	8	12	12	11	10	7	8	8	12	8	9	8	7	5	5	7	9	7	7	9	12	13	15	14	14	13	14	14	12	12

Source: Ligue 1
A = Away; H = Home; W = Win; D = Draw; L = Loss

==== Results ====
4 August 2007 1	AS Monaco	1 – 1	Saint-Étienne	Fontvieille
20:00 CEST UTC+2	Muratori (yellow card) 31'; Piquionne 44'; Plašil (yellow card) 48'; Ménez (yellow card) 90+2'	Report	Feindouno 48' (pen.); Tavlaridis (yellow card) 55'; Nivaldo (yellow card) 79'; Sall (yellow card) 90+3'	Stadium: Stade Louis II; Attendance: 17,134; Referee: Thierry Auriac

11 August 2007 2	Lorient	2 – 1	AS Monaco	Lorient
20:00 CEST UTC+2	Saïfi 14', 30'; Ewolo (yellow card) 32'; Audard (yellow card) 90+1'	Report	Berthod (yellow card) 13'; Leko (yellow card) 26'; Plašil (yellow card) 30'; Gakpé 66'; Roma (yellow card) 74'	Stadium: Stade du Moustoir; Attendance: 11,981; Referee: Laurent Duhamel

15 August 2007 3	AS Monaco	2 – 0	Metz	Fontvieille
20:30 CEST UTC+2	Modesto 31'; Piquionne 85'	Report	Djiba (yellow card) 30'; Léoni (yellow card) 45'; François (yellow card) 45+1'; Gueye (yellow card) 89'	Stadium: Stade Louis II; Attendance: 11,392; Referee: Hervé Piccirillo

18 August 2007 4	Sochaux	0 – 3	AS Monaco	Montbéliard
17:10 CEST UTC+2	Sène (yellow card) 65'	Report	Koller 1', 89'; Ménez 57'	Stadium: Stade Auguste Bonal; Attendance: 14,091; Referee: Stéphane Bré

25 August 2007 5	AS Monaco	3 – 1	Le Mans	Fontvieille
20:00 CEST UTC+2	Ménez (yellow card) 41' (goal) 50'; Pérez (yellow card) 43'; Cufré 48' (pen.); Piquionne 64'	Report	Matsui 31'; Romaric (yellow card) 43'; Baša (yellow card) 59'	Stadium: Stade Louis II; Attendance: 11,033; Referee: Lionel Jaffredo

29 August 2007 6	Lille	0 – 1	AS Monaco	Villeneuve-d'Ascq
20:30 CEST UTC+2	Lichtsteiner (yellow card) 30'; Obraniak (red card) 45+1'; Plestan (yellow card) 54'; Emerson (yellow card) 68'; Youla (yellow card) 73'	Report	Piquionne 21'; Cufré (yellow card) 42'; Koller (yellow card) 79'	Stadium: Stade Pierre-Mauroy; Attendance: 13,849; Referee: Olivier Thual

1 September 2007 7	Bordeaux	2 – 1	AS Monaco	Bordeaux
17:10 CEST UTC+2	Chamakh 61'; Jurietti (yellow card) 73'; Wendel 74'	Report	Piquionne (yellow card) 34'; Leko (yellow card) 69'; Nenê 89'	Stadium: Nouveau Stade de Bordeaux; Attendance: 23,390; Referee: Fredy Fautrel

16 September 2007 8	AS Monaco	1 – 2	Paris Saint-Germain	Fontvieille
16:00 CEST UTC+2	Pérez (yellow card) 50'; Ménez (yellow card) 59' (goal) 85'	Report	Armand 40'; Diané 53'	Stadium: Stade Louis II; Attendance: 12,694; Referee: Bertrand Layec

22 September 2007 9	Valenciennes	1 – 0	AS Monaco	Valenciennes
20:00 CEST UTC+2	Audel 11'; Ouaddou (yellow card) 45'; Saez (yellow card) 83' (red card) 88'; Rippert (red card) 90+1'	Report	Ménez (yellow card) 28' (red card) 43'; Muratori (yellow card) 34'; Roma (yellow card) 43'; Pérez (yellow card) 89'	Stadium: Stade du Hainaut; Attendance: 14,225; Referee: Thierry Auriac

5 October 2007 10	AS Monaco	1 – 3	Nancy	Fontvieille
21:00 CEST UTC+2	Koller 74'	Report	Kim 32', 47'; Puygrenier (yellow card) 32'; Basser (yellow card) 34'; Dia 38'	Stadium: Stade Louis II; Attendance: 8,851; Referee: Éric Poulat

20 October 2007 11	Lyon	3 – 1	AS Monaco	Lyon
16:15 CEST UTC+2	Juninho 12' (pen.); Réveillère 18'; Benzema 50'; Bodmer (yellow card) 82'; Anderson (yellow card) 89'	Report	Meriem (yellow card) 11'; Monsoreau 42'; Cufré (yellow card) 54'; Leko (yellow card) 55'	Stadium: Stade de Gerland; Attendance: 36,254; Referee: Philippe Kal

27 October 2007 12	AS Monaco	0 – 0	SM Caen	Fontvieille
20:00 CET UTC+1	Muratori (yellow card) 76'	Report	Nivet (yellow card) 39' (red card) 53'; Seube (yellow card) 45'; Planté (yellow card) 90+5'	Stadium: Stade Louis II; Attendance: 8,986; Referee: Olivier Lamarre

3 November 2007 13	Rennes	0 – 1	AS Monaco	Rennes
20:00 CET UTC+1	Cheyrou (yellow card) 25'	Report	Pérez (yellow card) 14'; Adriano (yellow card) 22'; Leko (yellow card) 38'; Piquionne 46'; Modesto (yellow card) 62'; Roma (yellow card) 90+2'	Stadium: Roazhon Park; Attendance: 27,754; Referee: Tony Chapron

10 November 2007 14	AS Monaco	3 – 0	RC Strasbourg	Fontvieille
20:00 CET UTC+1	Gakpé 43'; Nenê 62', 90'; Ménez (yellow card) 89'	Report		Stadium: Stade Louis II; Attendance: 9,448; Referee: Bruno Ruffray

24 November 2007 15	Toulouse	0 – 0	AS Monaco	Toulouse
20:00 CET UTC+1		Report		Stadium: Stadium Municipal; Attendance: 15,434; Referee: Stéphane Lannoy

2 December 2007 16	AS Monaco	1 – 1	Nice	Fontvieille
20:00 CET UTC+1	Adriano (yellow card) 15'; Leko (yellow card) 19'; Koller 86'; Cufré (yellow card) 90'; Modesto (yellow card)	Report	Echouafni (yellow card) 31'; Bamogo (yellow card) 39'; Rool (yellow card) 41'; Laslandes 90+2'	Stadium: Stade Louis II; Attendance: 15,394; Referee: Stéphane Bré

8 December 2007 17	Marseille	2 – 0	AS Monaco	Marseille
17:10 CET UTC+1	Rodriguez 52'; Cana (yellow card) 56' (goal) 69'	Report	Meriem (yellow card) 27'; Piquionne (yellow card) 65'; Muratori (yellow card) 71'; Bernardi (yellow card) 79'	Stadium: Stade Vélodrome; Attendance: 50,510; Referee: Damien Ledentu

15 December 2007 18	AS Monaco	2 – 0	Lens	Fontvieille
20:00 CET UTC+1	Modesto (yellow card) 23'; Ménez (yellow card) 27' (goal) 52', 82'; Pérez (yellow card) 75'	Report	Dindane (yellow card) 55' (yellow-red card) 90+2'	Stadium: Stade Louis II; Attendance: 14,578; Referee: Fredy Fautrel

22 December 2007 19	AJ Auxerre	1 – 0	AS Monaco	Auxerre
20:00 CET UTC+1	Traoré 68'; Lejeune (yellow card) 73'	Report	Meriem (yellow card) 65'	Stadium: Stade de l'Abbé-Deschamps; Attendance: 8,952; Referee: Thierry Auriac

12 January 2008 20	AS Monaco	1 – 0	Lorient	Fontvieille
20:00 CET UTC+1	Meriem (yellow card) 27'; Bernardi (yellow card) 52'; Sambou 90+1'	Report	Marchal (yellow card) 35'	Stadium: Stade Louis II; Attendance: 7,434; Referee: Antony Gautier

19 January 2008 21	Metz	1 – 4	AS Monaco	Metz
20:00 CET UTC+1	Cubilier (yellow card) 29'; Aguirre 54'; Belson (yellow card) 86'	Report	Piquionne (yellow card) 23' (goal) 31'; Ménez 30', 62'; Berthod (yellow card) 60'; Gakpé 84'	Stadium: Stade Saint-Symphorien; Attendance: 12,197; Referee: Fredy Fautrel

23 January 2008 22	AS Monaco	1 – 0	Sochaux	Fontvieille
20:30 CET UTC+1	Modesto (yellow card) 64'; Piquionne 78'; Adriano (yellow card) 80'	Report	Pichot (yellow card) 40'	Stadium: Stade Louis II; Attendance: 7,093; Referee: Jean-Charles Cailleux

26 January 2008 23	Le Mans	1 – 0	AS Monaco	Le Mans
20:00 CET UTC+1	Le Tallec (yellow card) 21'; Matsui 22'	Report	Adriano (yellow card) 35'; Pérez (yellow card) 65'; Nenê (yellow card) 85'	Stadium: Stade Léon-Bollée; Attendance: 9,417; Referee: Stéphane Bré

9 February 2008 24	AS Monaco	0 – 0	Lille	Fontvieille
20:00 CET UTC+1	Berthod (yellow card) 7'; Bernardi (yellow card) 54'; Cufré (yellow card) 63'	Report	Dumont (yellow card) 15'; Béria (yellow card) 85'	Stadium: Stade Louis II; Attendance: 7,679; Referee: Philippe Kalt

17 February 2008 25	AS Monaco	0 – 6	Bordeaux	Fontvieille
18:00 CET UTC+1	Sambou (yellow card) 17'; Leko (yellow card) 63'; Pérez (red card) 65'	Report	Henrique (yellow card) 9'; Diarra (yellow card) 37'; Cavenaghi 51', 64' (yellow card) 67'; Micoud 60', 87'; Chamakh 81'; Obertan 90+1'	Stadium: Stade Louis II; Attendance: 10,018; Referee: Antony Gautier

23 February 2008 26	Paris Saint-Germain	1 – 1	AS Monaco	Paris
20:00 CET UTC+1	Diané 42'; Clément (yellow card) 44'	Report	Gakpé (yellow card) 63'; Almirón 72'; Adriano (yellow card) 76'	Stadium: Parc des Princes; Attendance: 38,652; Referee: Fredy Fautrel

1 March 2008 27	AS Monaco	0 – 0	Valenciennes	Fontvieille
20:00 CET UTC+1	Modesto (yellow card) 51'	Report	Chelle (yellow card) 52'	Stadium: Stade Louis II; Attendance: 7,912; Referee: Philippe Malige

8 March 2008 28	Nancy	2 – 0	AS Monaco	Tomblaine
20:00 CET UTC+1	Modesto 6' (o.g.); Biancalani (yellow card) 9'; Hadji 19'; Puygrenier (yellow card) 86'	Report	Bolívar (yellow card) 43'; Leko (yellow card) 45'; Bernardi (yellow card) 63'; Muratori (yellow card) 81'	Stadium: Stade Marcel Picot; Attendance: 18,541; Referee: Laurent Duhamel

15 March 2008 29	AS Monaco	0 – 3	Lyon	Fontvieille
16:00 CET UTC+1	Modesto (yellow card) 33'	Report	Keïta 21', 38'; Fred 35'	Stadium: Stade Louis II; Attendance: 12,321; Referee: Stéphane Lannoy

22 March 2008 30	SM Caen	4 – 1	AS Monaco	Caen
20:00 CET UTC+1	Planté (yellow card) 45'; Hengbart 62' (pen.); Sorbon 76'; Gouffran 86'; Jemâa 90+3'	Report	Sambou 6'; Leko (yellow card) 45'; Roma (yellow card) 46'; Nenê (yellow card) 80'	Stadium: Stade Michel d'Ornano; Attendance: 20,082; Referee: Tony Chapron

31 March 2008 31	AS Monaco	1 – 2	Rennes	Fontvieille
19:00 CEST UTC+2	Nenê (yellow card) 25'; Sambou 37'; Cufré (yellow card) 53'; Adriano (yellow card) 77'	Report	Hansson 19' (yellow card) 56'; Mbia (yellow card) 47'; Pagis 90+2'	Stadium: Stade Louis II; Attendance: 7,164; Referee: Damien Ledentu

5 April 2008 32	Strasbourg	0 – 2	AS Monaco	Strasbourg
20:00 CEST UTC+2	Johansen (yellow card) 50'	Report	Adriano (yellow card) 29'; Pokrivač (yellow card) 38'; Nenê 66'; Modesto (yellow card) 71'; Santos 83'	Stadium: Stade de la Meinau; Attendance: 19,106; Referee: Jean-Charles Cailleux

12 April 2008 33	AS Monaco	0 – 2	Toulouse	Fontvieille
20:00 CEST UTC+2	Modesto (yellow card) 89'	Report	Batlles 4'; Elmander 47'; Mathieu (yellow card) 73'; Sissoko (yellow card) 85'	Stadium: Stade Louis II; Attendance: 9,499; Referee: Bertrand Layec

19 April 2008 34	Nice	0 – 2	AS Monaco	Nice
20:00 CEST UTC+2	Diakité (yellow card) 45+1'; Echouafni (yellow card) 63'; Laslandes (yellow card) 71'; Balmont (yellow card) 83'	Report	Pérez (yellow card) 17'; Leko (yellow card) 26'; Adriano (yellow card) 33' (yellow-red card) 84'; Meriem 35'; Nenê (yellow card) 52'; Cufré (yellow card) 74'; Almirón 90'; Pokrivač (red card) 90+4'	Stadium: Stade du Ray; Attendance: 13,455; Referee: Stéphane Lannoy

27 April 2008 35	AS Monaco	2 – 3	Marseille	Fontvieille
20:55 CEST UTC+2	Monsoreau (yellow card) 18'; Leko (yellow card) 44' (goal) 63'; González 56'; Almirón (yellow card) 83'; Berthod (yellow card) 85'	Report	Nasri 28'; Cana (yellow card) 44'; Taiwo 61'; Kaboré (yellow card) 62'; Rodriguez (yellow card) 87'; Cissé 82' (yellow card) 90+4'	Stadium: Stade Louis II; Attendance: 17,351; Referee: Laurent Duhamel

3 May 2008 36	Lens	0 – 0	AS Monaco	Lens
20:00 CEST UTC+2		Report	González (yellow card) 54'; Adriano (yellow card) 57'; Meriem (yellow card) 62'	Stadium: Stade Bollaert-Delelis; Attendance: 39,399

10 May 2008 37	AS Monaco	3 – 0	AJ Auxerre	Fontvieille
20:45 CEST UTC+2	Bakar 48'; Nenê 75'; Meriem 82'	Report		Stadium: Stade Louis II; Attendance: 9,839; Referee: Hervé Piccirillo

17 May 2008 38	Saint-Étienne	4 – 0	AS Monaco	Saint-Étienne
20:50 CEST UTC+2	Gomis 4', 7'; Dernis 33'; Feindouno 81'	Report	Pokrivač (yellow card) 47'	Stadium: Stade Geoffroy-Guichard; Attendance: 34,237; Referee: Thierry Auriac

=== Coupe de la Ligue ===
27 September 2007 Third Round	Nantes	2 – 3	AS Monaco	Nantes
20:50 CEST UTC+2	Keșerü 14' (yellow card) 44'; Heinz 35'	Report	Adriano (yellow card) 30'; Nenê 48' (pen.), 71'; Gakpé 53'; Cufré (yellow card) 60'	Stadium: Stade de la Beaujoire; Attendance: 7,944; Referee: Tony Chapron

31 October 2007 Round of 16	AS Monaco	1 – 2	Lens	Fontvieille
17:00 CET UTC+1	Piquionne 67'; Pérez (yellow card) 81'	Report	Boukari 15'; Coulibaly (yellow card) 35'; Demont (yellow card) 41'; Kovačević (yellow card) 58'; Carrière 83'; Monterrubio (yellow card) 90+2'	Stadium: Stade Louis II; Attendance: 8,604; Referee: Philippe Malige

=== Coupe de France ===
6 January 2008 Round of 64	Stade Brest	1 – 3 (a.e.t.)	AS Monaco	Brest
CET UTC+1	Socrier 19'	[ Report]	Bakar 90+1', 99', 110'	Stadium: Stade Francis-Le Blé

3 February 2008 Round of 32	Marseille	3 – 1	AS Monaco	Marseille
CET UTC+1	Valbuena 6'; Grandin 10'; Cissé 62'	[ Report]	Bakar 70'	Stadium: Stade Vélodrome

== Statistics ==
As of match played 17 May 2008

=== Appearances and goals ===
No.	Pos	Nat	Player	Total		Ligue 1		Coupe de France		Coupe de la Ligue	
No.	Pos	Nat	Player	Apps	Goals	Apps	Goals	Apps	Goals	Apps	Goals
2	DF	(France) FRA	Sylvain Monsoreau	28	1	23+3	1	0	0	2	0
3	DF	(France) FRA	Jérémy Berthod	12	0	9+3	0	0	0	0	0
4	DF	(France) FRA	François Modesto	28	1	23+3	1	0	0	2	0
5	MF	(Uruguay) URU	Diego Pérez	27	0	23+2	0	0	0	1+1	0
6	MF	(Croatia) CRO	Nikola Pokrivač	9	0	5+4	0	0	0	0	0
7	MF	(Argentina) ARG	Lucas Bernardi	20	0	18+1	0	0	0	1	0
8	MF	(Argentina) ARG	Sergio Almirón	7	2	4+3	2	0	0	0	0
10	FW	(France) FRA	Jérémy Ménez	26	7	21+4	7	0	0	1	0
11	MF	(Brazil) BRA	Nenê	30	7	24+4	5	0	0	1+1	2
12	DF	(Brazil) BRA	Adriano	26	0	23+1	0	0	0	2	0
13	DF	(France) FRA	Vincent Muratori	23	0	22	0	0	0	1	0
14	MF	(France) FRA	Malaury Martin	7	0	4+3	0	0	0	0	0
15	DF	(Brazil) BRA	Fábio Santos	5	1	3+2	1	0	0	0	0
16	GK	(France) FRA	Stéphane Ruffier	10	0	9+1	0	0	0	0	0
17	MF	(France) FRA	Serge Gakpé	32	4	12+18	3	0	0	2	1
18	FW	(France) FRA	Frédéric Piquionne	34	8	26+6	7	0	0	1+1	1
20	MF	(Uruguay) URU	Ignacio María González	5	1	2+3	1	0	0	0	0
21	MF	(France) FRA	Camel Meriem	29	2	24+3	2	0	0	2	0
22	DF	(Brazil) BRA	Bolívar	22	0	21+1	0	0	0	0	0
23	MF	(Croatia) CRO	Jerko Leko	31	1	22+7	1	0	0	2	0
24	DF	(Democratic Republic of the Congo) COD	Cédric Mongongu	4	0	2+2	0	0	0	0	0
25	DF	(Argentina) ARG	Leandro Cufré	26	1	22+3	1	0	0	1	0
26	DF	(Senegal) SEN	Massamba Sambou	12	3	12	3	0	0	0	0
28	MF	(France) FRA	Djamel Bakar	17	1	8+9	1	0	0	0	0
30	GK	(Italy) ITA	Flavio Roma	32	0	30	0	0	0	2	0
33	FW	(France) FRA	Steve Pinau	3	0	0+3	0	0	0	0	0
Players away from the club on loan:
20	FW	(Colombia) COL	Juan Pablo Pino	18	0	5+11	0	0	0	0+2	0
Players who appeared for Monaco no longer at the club:
6	MF	(Czech Republic) CZE	Jaroslav Plašil	4	0	3+1	0	0	0	0	0
8	FW	(Sierra Leone) SLE	Mohamed Kallon	2	0	2	0	0	0	0	0
9	FW	(Czech Republic) CZE	Jan Koller	19	4	11+7	4	0	0	1	0

=== Goal scorers ===
Place	Position	Nation	Number	Name	Ligue 1	Coupe de France	Coupe de la Ligue	Total
1	FW	(France)	18	Frédéric Piquionne	7	0	1	8
2	FW	(France)	10	Jérémy Ménez	7	0	0	7
2	MF	(Brazil)	11	Nenê	5	0	2	7
4	MF	(France)	28	Djamel Bakar	1	4	0	5
5	FW	(Czech Republic)	9	Jan Koller	4	0	0	4
5	MF	(France)	17	Serge Gakpé	3	0	1	4
7	DF	(Senegal)	26	Massamba Sambou	3	0	0	3
8	MF	(Argentina)	8	Sergio Almirón	2	0	0	2
8	MF	(France)	21	Camel Meriem	2	0	0	2
10	DF	(France)	4	François Modesto	1	0	0	1
10	DF	(Argentina)	25	Leandro Cufré	1	0	0	1
10	DF	(France)	2	Sylvain Monsoreau	1	0	0	1
10	DF	(Brazil)	15	Fábio Santos	1	0	0	1
10	MF	(Croatia)	23	Jerko Leko	1	0	0	1
10	MF	(Uruguay)	20	Nacho González	1	0	0	1
				TOTALS	40	4	4	48

=== Disciplinary record ===
Number	Nation	Position	Name	Ligue 1		Coupe de France		Coupe de la Ligue		Total	
Number	Nation	Position	Name	Yellow card	Red card	Yellow card	Red card	Yellow card	Red card	Yellow card	Red card
2	(France)	DF	Sylvain Monsoreau	1	0			0	0	1	0
3	(France)	DF	Jérémy Berthod	4	0			0	0	4	0
4	(France)	DF	François Modesto	8	0			0	0	8	0
5	(Uruguay)	MF	Diego Pérez	7	1			1	0	8	1
6	(Czech Republic)	MF	Jaroslav Plašil	2	0			0	0	2	0
6	(Croatia)	MF	Nikola Pokrivač	2	1			0	0	2	1
7	(Argentina)	MF	Lucas Bernardi	4	0			0	0	4	0
8	(Argentina)	MF	Sergio Almirón	1	0			0	0	1	0
9	(Czech Republic)	FW	Jan Koller	1	0			0	0	1	0
10	(France)	FW	Jérémy Ménez	7	1			0	0	7	0
11	(Brazil)	MF	Nenê	4	0			0	0	4	0
12	(Brazil)	DF	Adriano	10	1			1	0	11	1
13	(France)	DF	Vincent Muratori	4	0			0	0	4	0
17	(France)	MF	Serge Gakpé	1	0			0	0	1	0
18	(France)	FW	Frédéric Piquionne	3	0			0	0	3	0
20	(Uruguay)	MF	Nacho González	1	0			0	0	1	0
21	(France)	MF	Camel Meriem	5	0			0	0	5	0
22	(Brazil)	DF	Bolívar	1	0			0	0	1	0
23	(Croatia)	MF	Jerko Leko	10	0			0	0	10	0
25	(Argentina)	DF	Leandro Cufré	6	0			1	0	7	0
26	(Senegal)	DF	Massamba Sambou	1	0			0	0	1	0
30	(Italy)	GK	Flavio Roma	4	0			0	0	4	0
			TOTALS	87	4			3	0	90	4
