= 2003–04 Stade Malherbe Caen season =

Stade Malherbe Caen
2003–04 season
- Head coach: Patrick Rémy
- Stadium: Stade Michel d'Ornano
- Ligue 2: 2nd (promoted)
- Coupe de France: Round of 16
- Coupe de la Ligue: First round
- Top goalscorer: Cyrille Watier (12)

The 2003–04 season was the 91st season in the existence of Stade Malherbe Caen and the club's seventh consecutive season in the second division of French football. In addition to the domestic league, Stade Malherbe Caen participated in this season's editions of the Coupe de France and the Coupe de la Ligue.

== Pre-season and friendlies ==
Win Draw Loss

== Competitions ==
=== Overall record ===
Competition	First match	Last match	Starting round	Final position	Record							
Competition	First match	Last match	Starting round	Final position	Pld	W	D	L	GF	GA	GD	Win %
Ligue 2	2 August 2003	22 May 2004	Matchday 1	2nd	38	20	11	7	56	31	+25	52.63
Coupe de France	22 November 2003	11 February 2004	Seventh round	Round of 16	5	4	0	1	8	3	+5	80.00
Coupe de la Ligue	23 September 2003		First round	First round	1	0	0	1	0	2	−2	0.00
Total					44	24	11	9	64	36	+28	54.55

Last updated: 22 May 2004
Source: Competitions

=== Ligue 2 ===
==== League table ====
Pos	Team	Pld	W	D	L	GF	GA	GD	Pts	Promotion or Relegation
1	Saint-Étienne (C, P)	38	22	7	9	44	29	+15	73	Promotion to Ligue 1
2	Caen (P)	38	20	11	7	56	31	+25	71	Promotion to Ligue 1
3	Istres (P)	38	19	9	10	44	26	+18	66	Promotion to Ligue 1
4	Lorient	38	17	10	11	57	45	+12	61	
5	Sedan	38	15	15	8	42	31	+11	60	

Source: Ligue 2
(C) Champions; (P) Promoted

==== Results summary ====
Overall								Home						Away					
Pld	W	D	L	GF	GA	GD	Pts	W	D	L	GF	GA	GD	W	D	L	GF	GA	GD
38	20	11	7	56	31	+25	71	12	4	3	31	15	+16	8	7	4	25	16	+9

Last updated: 22 May 2004.
Source: Ligue 2

==== Results by round ====
Round	1	2	3	4	5	6	7	8	9	10	11	12	13	14	15	16	17	18	19	20	21	22	23	24	25	26	27	28	29	30	31	32	33	34	35	36	37	38
Ground	A	H	A	H	A	H	A	H	A	H	A	H	A	H	A	H	A	H	A	A	H	A	H	A	H	A	H	A	H	A	H	A	H	A	H	A	H	H
Result	D	L	L	D	L	W	W	W	D	W	D	W	D	W	D	W	W	D	W	D	W	L	L	W	D	D	W	L	W	W	L	W	W	W	D	W	W	W
Position	7	12	18	17	20	17	14	10	9	6	8	5	6	6	6	4	3	5	4	4	3	5	6	5	5	5	3	3	3	3	3	3	2	2	2	2	2	2

Source: Ligue 2
A = Away; H = Home; W = Win; D = Draw; L = Loss

==== Matches ====
2 August 2003 1	Troyes	2–2	Caen	Troyes
--:-- CEST (UTC+2)				Stadium: Stade de l'Aube

9 August 2003 2	Caen	1–2	Clermont	Caen
--:-- CEST (UTC+2)				Stadium: Stade Michel d'Ornano

16 August 2003 3	Istres	3–1	Caen
--:-- CEST (UTC+2)

19 August 2003 4	Caen	0–0	Grenoble	Caen
--:-- CEST (UTC+2)				Stadium: Stade Michel d'Ornano

23 August 2003 5	Laval	1–0	Caen
--:-- CEST (UTC+2)

30 August 2003 6	Caen	1–0	Angers	Caen
--:-- CEST (UTC+2)				Stadium: Stade Michel d'Ornano

5 September 2003 7	Niort	0–3	Caen
--:-- CEST (UTC+2)

13 September 2003 8	Caen	2–1	Gueugnon	Caen
--:-- CEST (UTC+2)				Stadium: Stade Michel d'Ornano

20 September 2003 9	Châteauroux	1–1	Caen
--:-- CEST (UTC+2)

27 September 2003 10	Caen	1–0	Saint-Étienne	Caen
--:-- CEST (UTC+2)				Stadium: Stade Michel d'Ornano

4 October 2003 11	Le Havre	1–1	Caen
--:-- CEST (UTC+2)

18 October 2003 12	Caen	2–0	Lorient	Caen
--:-- CEST (UTC+2)				Stadium: Stade Michel d'Ornano

25 October 2003 13	Créteil	0–0	Caen
--:-- CEST (UTC+2)

1 November 2003 14	Caen	4–1	Valence	Caen
--:-- CET (UTC+1)				Stadium: Stade Michel d'Ornano

8 November 2003 15	Sedan	0–0	Caen
--:-- CET (UTC+1)

30 November 2003 16	Caen	2–1	Amiens	Caen
--:-- CET (UTC+1)				Stadium: Stade Michel d'Ornano

3 December 2003 17	Besançon	0–1	Caen
--:-- CET (UTC+1)

7 December 2003 18	Caen	1–1	Rouen	Caen
--:-- CET (UTC+1)				Stadium: Stade Michel d'Ornano

20 December 2003 19	Nancy	0–2	Caen
--:-- CET (UTC+1)

10 January 2004 20	Clermont	2–2	Caen
--:-- CET (UTC+1)

17 January 2004 21	Caen	2–1	Istres	Caen
--:-- CET (UTC+1)				Stadium: Stade Michel d'Ornano

31 January 2004 22	Grenoble	2–1	Caen
--:-- CET (UTC+1)

7 February 2004 23	Caen	1–2	Laval	Caen
--:-- CET (UTC+1)				Stadium: Stade Michel d'Ornano

14 February 2004 24	Angers	0–1	Caen
--:-- CET (UTC+1)

23 February 2004 25	Caen	2–2	Niort	Caen
--:-- CET (UTC+1)				Stadium: Stade Michel d'Ornano

28 February 2004 26	Gueugnon	0–0	Caen
--:-- CET (UTC+1)

6 March 2004 27	Caen	1–0	Châteauroux	Caen
--:-- CET (UTC+1)				Stadium: Stade Michel d'Ornano

14 March 2004 28	Saint-Étienne	1–0	Caen
16:00 CET (UTC+1)				Attendance: 24,512; Referee: Eric Brocas

21 March 2004 29	Caen	3–1	Le Havre	Caen
--:-- CET (UTC+1)				Stadium: Stade Michel d'Ornano

27 March 2004 30	Lorient	2–3	Caen
--:-- CET (UTC+1)

3 April 2004 31	Caen	1–2	Créteil	Caen
--:-- CEST (UTC+2)				Stadium: Stade Michel d'Ornano

10 April 2004 32	Valence	0–2	Caen
--:-- CEST (UTC+2)

24 April 2004 33	Caen	1–0	Sedan	Caen
--:-- CEST (UTC+2)				Stadium: Stade Michel d'Ornano

2 May 2004 34	Amiens	0–3	Caen
--:-- CEST (UTC+2)

8 May 2004 35	Caen	1–1	Besançon	Caen
--:-- CEST (UTC+2)				Stadium: Stade Michel d'Ornano

12 May 2004 36	Rouen	1–2	Caen
--:-- CEST (UTC+2)

16 May 2004 37	Caen	2–0	Nancy	Caen
--:-- CEST (UTC+2)				Stadium: Stade Michel d'Ornano

22 May 2004 38	Caen	3–0	Troyes	Caen
--:-- CEST (UTC+2)				Stadium: Stade Michel d'Ornano

=== Coupe de France ===
22 November 2003 Seventh round	Caen	3–2	Stade Lamballais	Caen
--:-- CET (UTC+1)				Stadium: Stade Michel d'Ornano

14 December 2003 Eighth round	US Chantilly	0–3	Caen	Chantilly
14:30 CET (UTC+1)				Stadium: Stade des Bourgognes

3 January 2004 Round of 64	Caen	1–0	Le Havre	Caen
20:00 CET (UTC+1)	Watier 78' (pen.)			Stadium: Stade Michel d'Ornano; Attendance: 10,112; Referee: Bruno Derrien

24 January 2004 Round of 32	Caen	1–0	Cannes	Caen
20:00 CET (UTC+1)	Mazure 3'			Stadium: Stade Michel d'Ornano; Attendance: 7,197; Referee: Jean-Marc Bonnin

11 February 2004 Round of 16	Amiens	1–0	Caen	Amiens
20:00 CET (UTC+1)	Buron 9'			Stadium: Stade de la Licorne; Attendance: 5,816; Referee: Stéphane Moulin

=== Coupe de la Ligue ===
23 September 2003 First round	Troyes	2–0	Caen	Troyes
--:-- CEST (UTC+2)				Stadium: Stade de l'Aube
