= Hermann Ouédraogo =

Burkinabé footballer

Hyacinthe Ouédraogo
Personal information
- Full name: Hermann Hyacinthe Ouédraogo
- Date of birth: December 12, 1981 (age 44)
- Place of birth: Ouagadougou, Upper Volta
- Height: 1.85 m (6 ft 1 in)
- Position: Striker

Team information
- Current team: US Ouagdougou

Youth career
- 1999–2001: Planéte Champions

Senior career*
Years	Team	Apps	(Gls)
2003–2004	Planéte Champions	27	(11)
2004	FC Istres	5	(2)
2005–	US Ouagdougou	204	(100)

International career
2004–2007	Burkina Faso	15	(3)
- * Club domestic league appearances and goals

Hermann Hyacinthe Ouédraogo (born 12 December 1981) is a Burkina Faso football player who is currently playing for Union Sportive de Ouagadougou.

== Career ==
Ouédraogo began his career with the Planéte Champions and joined in summer 2004 to French club FC Istres, but after a bad first half of the 2004–2005 season turned in January 2005 back to Burkina Faso and signed for Union Sportive de Ouagadougou.

== International career ==
He was part of the Burkinabé team, who finished of the fourth place in the 2006 FIFA World Cup qualification (CAF) and played his last game at the UEMOA Tournament 2007.
