= Maicon (footballer, born 1981) =

Brazilian footballer (born 1981)

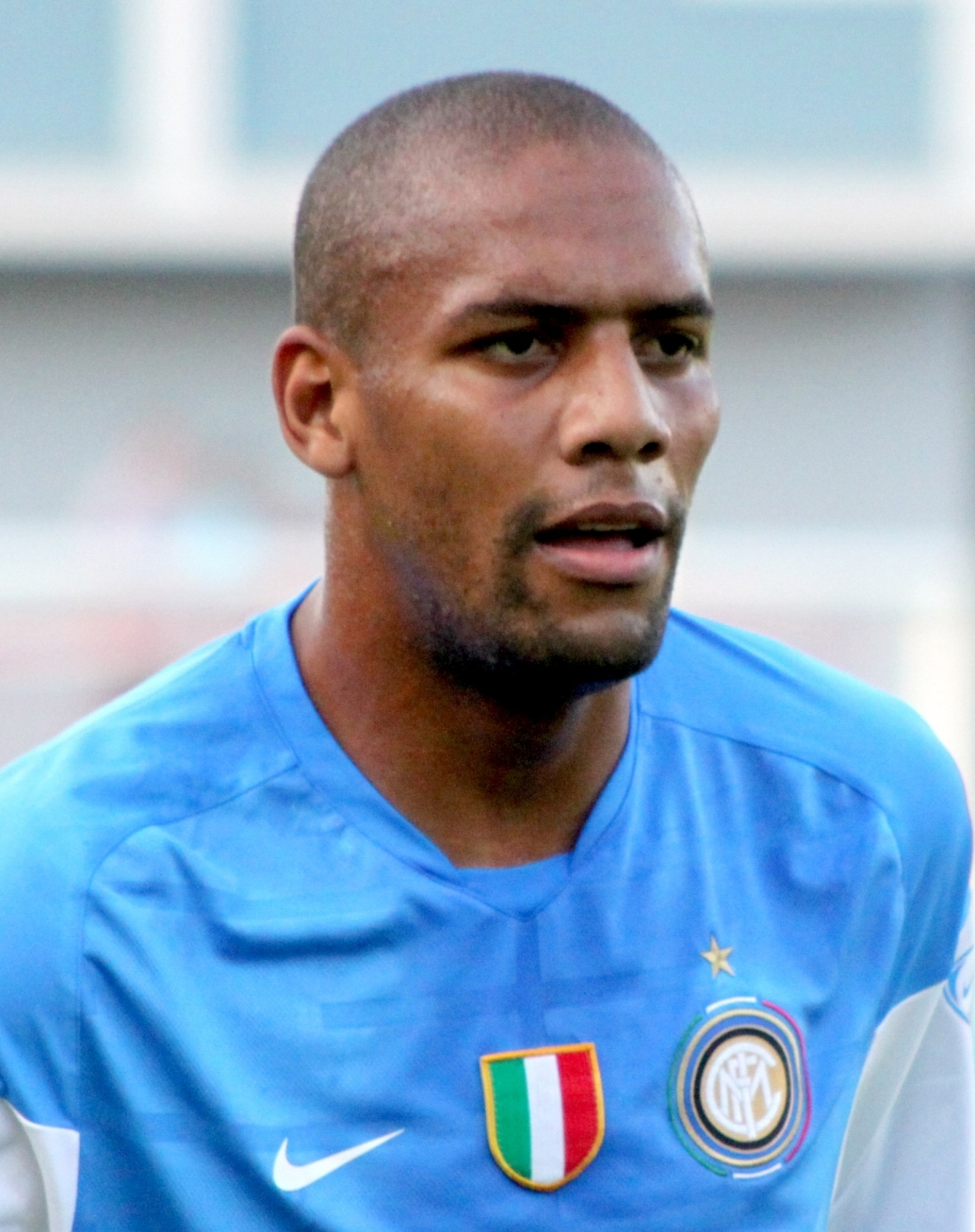
- Maicon with Inter Milan in 2009

Personal information
- Full name: Maicon Douglas Sisenando
- Date of birth: 26 July 1981 (age 45)
- Place of birth: Novo Hamburgo, Brazil
- Height: 1.85 m (6 ft 1 in)
- Position: Right-back

Youth career
- 1995: Grêmio
- 1999–2000: Criciúma
- 2000–2001: Cruzeiro

Senior career*
Years	Team	Apps	(Gls)
2000–2004	Cruzeiro	78	(1)
2004–2006	Monaco	58	(5)
2006–2012	Inter Milan	177	(16)
2012–2013	Manchester City	9	(0)
2013–2016	Roma	57	(4)
2017	Avaí	9	(1)
2019	Criciúma	27	(0)
2020	Villa Nova	8	(0)
2021	Sona	17	(0)
2021	Tre Penne	1	(0)
Total		441	(27)

International career
2001	Brazil U20	4	(0)
2003–2014	Brazil	76	(7)
Medal record
Men's football
Representing Brazil
FIFA Confederations Cup
Winner	2005 Germany
Winner	2009 South Africa
Copa América
Winner	2004 Peru
Winner	2007 Venezuela
CONCACAF Gold Cup
Runner-up	2003 Mexico & USA
U-20 South American Championship
Winner	2001 Ecuador
- * Club domestic league appearances and goals

Maicon Douglas Sisenando (born 26 July 1981), also known as Maicon Douglas (Brazilian Portuguese: [ˈmajkõ ˈdowɡlɐs]) or simply Maicon, is a Brazilian former professional footballer who played as a right-back.

Maicon began his career in his native country with Cruzeiro, after initially playing for Grêmio and Criciúma at youth level. He played 125 times for Cruzeiro between 2000 and 2004, earning one national league title and several other domestic competitions, before moving to Europe when he signed for Ligue 1 side Monaco. After two years in Monaco, he signed for Inter Milan in 2006, where he became an established first team player, going on to win the UEFA Champions League in 2010, four Serie A titles, the FIFA Club World Cup and various domestic competitions. In August 2012, he signed for Manchester City. Maicon failed to secure a regular place in the team, moving back to Italy to play for Roma the following season. He returned to Brazil in 2017, playing for Avaí, childhood club Criciúma and Villa Nova. He retired in 2021 after a brief stint in the Italian Serie D and the Sammarinese league.

As a Brazil international, Maicon made his debut in 2003 and represented his nation on 76 occasions, scoring seven goals. He won a runners-up medal at the 2003 CONCACAF Gold Cup, and took part in three Copa América tournaments (winning the competition in 2004 and 2007) and two FIFA World Cups (finishing in fourth-place in 2014 on home soil). He was also a member of the teams that won consecutive FIFA Confederations Cup titles in 2005 and 2009.

== Club career ==
=== Early career ===
A talented right-sided wingback, Maicon debuted for Cruzeiro in 2001 and after two successful seasons in Brazil, which included winning a championship and being called up for the Brazil national team in 2003, he was signed by Monaco for £2.1 million in June 2004.

=== Inter Milan ===
==== 2006–2009 ====
In July 2006, Inter Milan officially announced the signing of Maicon for a fee of £4.8 million and a five-year contract, along with fellow Brazilian fullback Maxwell and French midfielder Olivier Dacourt. During his time at Inter, he established himself as a reliable wing-back, solid defensively with an ability of making emphatic runs down the right wing, often setting up goals or scoring himself with his powerful right foot. He overtook Inter captain Javier Zanetti as the first choice right back, with the Argentine moving in midfield. He was generally considered one of the best wing-backs in the game.

During a UEFA Champions League match on 6 March 2007, Maicon was involved in a brawl with Valencia defender David Navarro. Maicon was originally banned for six matches, but the ban was reduced to three. A regular under former coach José Mourinho, he contributed his fair share of assists and goals as Inter won a fourth consecutive title in the 2008–09 season, including a match-winning brace against Siena.

==== 2009–10 season ====
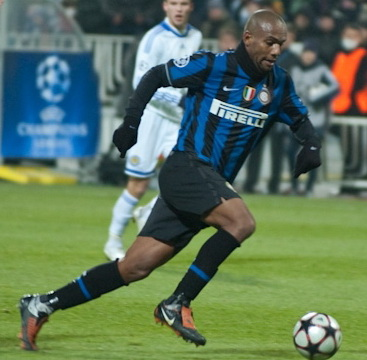
Maicon in action for Inter Milan in 2009.

Maicon continued the good form he displayed in previous seasons during the 2009–10 season; he started the season by scoring a goal against Milan in the 4–0 Derby della Madonnina victory, and then playing well against Barcelona in a 0–0 draw at the San Siro. He subsequently set up Diego Milito on matchday five in Serie A against Napoli, as Inter defeated Napoli 3–1. Maicon continued with his solid performances, notably scoring the last goal in a 5–0 win over Genoa on 17 October and making a fantastic byline run which resulted in Milito's match killing goal in a 5–3 home victory over Palermo two weeks later. In the very next match, he scored a goal against Livorno, where the match ended 2–0 for Inter. During Inter's home leg of the Derby d'Italia, the right back opened the scoring against Juventus with one of the most spectacular goals of the season, juggling a loose ball over the onrushing defender at the top of the penalty box and volleying it into the opposite corner.

Later that month, Maicon scored his first Champions League goal against reigning champions Barcelona when Inter registered a famous victory over the Catalans. He reportedly knocked out a tooth after he collided with Lionel Messi. Having overtaken Roma at the summit of the Serie A and winning the league title, Inter went on to eliminate Barcelona from the Champions League in the semi-finals, with Maicon earning praise. On 22 May 2010, after beating Roma in the Coppa Italia final weeks earlier, Inter won the Champions League, thus obtaining the treble, with a 2–0 victory over Bayern Munich in the final at the Santiago Bernabéu Stadium, Madrid. He was named the 2009–10 UEFA Club Defender of the Year and his performances earned him a nomination for the Ballon d'Or trophy as Europe's top player.

==== 2011–12 season ====
In the 2011–12 season, Maicon played just 23 games in Serie A. In his 23 appearances Maicon scored two goals, the first in a 2–1 defeat to Juventus at the San Siro on 29 October 2011, and the second in the Derby della Madonnina against Milan in a 4–2 win, on 6 May 2012. He scored from outside the penalty box with a belting shot into the top left corner of Marco Amelia's goal, in a game in which teammate Diego Milito scored a hat-trick.

=== Manchester City ===
On 31 August 2012, Maicon signed for Manchester City in a £3 million transfer deal, taking the number 3 shirt. He made his City debut on 15 September in a 1–1 draw against Stoke City. He made his home debut in a 2–1 win against Tottenham Hotspur on 11 November, replacing centre-back Matija Nastasić in the second half. Maicon struggled with injury throughout the season, but when fit he found it a struggle to break into the City team, ultimately failing to dislodge Pablo Zabaleta from the right back position and struggling to even supplant the injury-prone Micah Richards for the substitute right-back role fit. Maicon therefore rarely made City's substitutes' bench. When manager Roberto Mancini was sacked at the end of the season, his replacement Manuel Pellegrini was quick to move the player, omitting him from the club's pre-season tour of South Africa and commenting that he had no plans to include him in the squad.

=== Roma ===
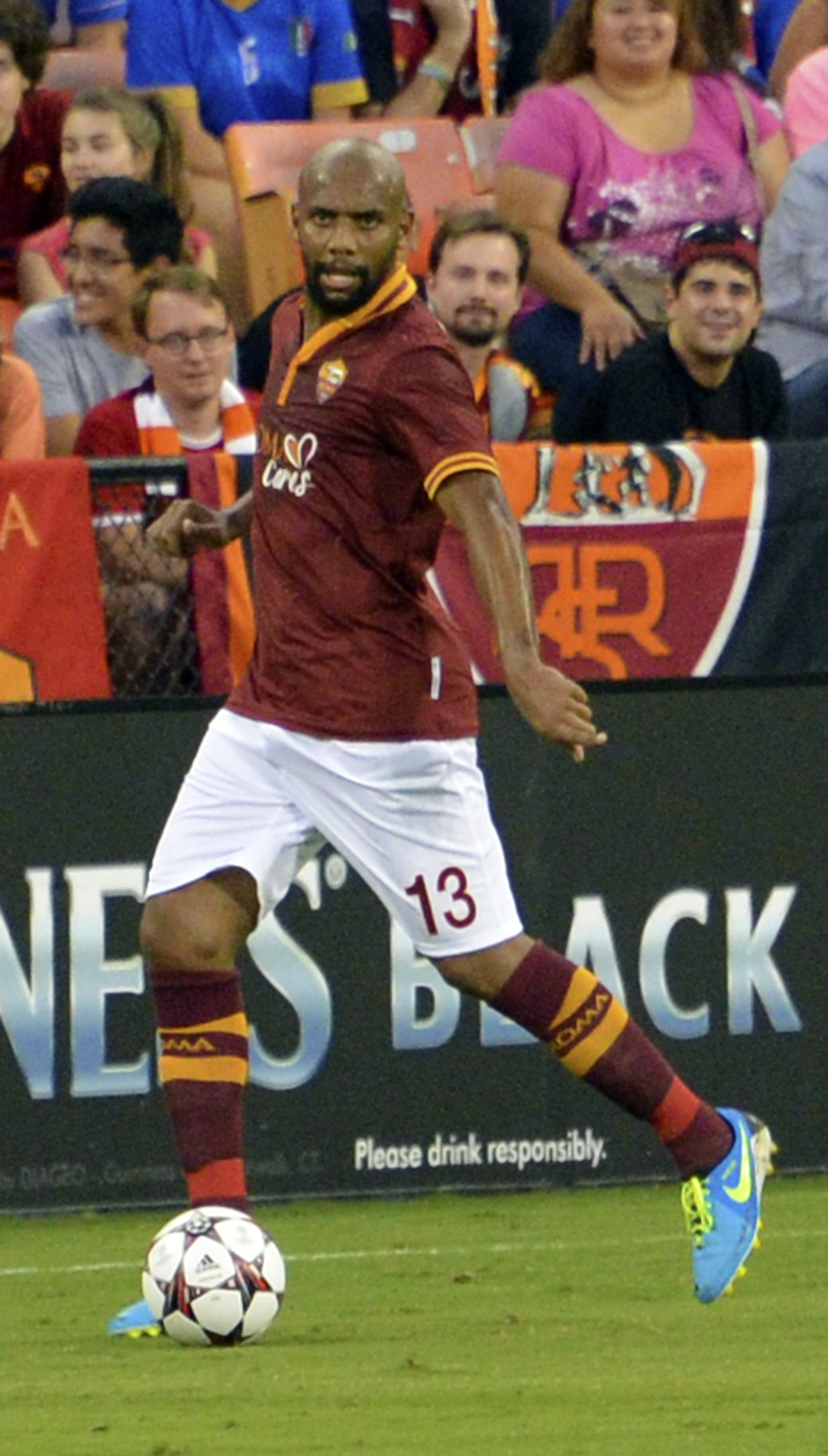
Maicon in action with Roma in 2013.

On 18 July 2013, Maicon returned to Serie A after Manchester City allowed him to move on a free transfer to Roma. His transfer was made official by Roma on 26 July on his 32nd birthday, with Maicon signing a two-year deal.

Roma started the 2013–14 season under manager Rudi Garcia with ten wins in its first ten Serie A games. He was allocated squad number 13, and made his competitive debut on 25 August in the opening league week against Livorno, playing full-90 minutes in a 0–2 away win. On 25 September, during the away match against Sampdoria, Maicon suffered a muscular injury and was replaced in the 35th minute; following the match, it was reported he had a first degree lesion in the right thigh, and the recovery time was around 15 days. Maicon returned in action for the league match against Napoli, helping the team to win 2–0 at home. Later on 8 December, Maicon scored his first goal for Roma in the 2–1 home win against Fiorentina, returning the team to the winning ways after four consecutive draws.

He started 2014 by scoring his second goal of the season in Roma's 4–0 home defeat of Genoa. Maicon made his Coppa Italia debut nine days later in the quarter-final against Juventus, contributing in a 1–0 home win and progression to the semi-final.

On 13 October 2014, Maicon agreed a contract extension with Roma, extending his stay at Stadio Olimpico until June 2016.

=== Avaí ===
On 31 May 2017, Maicon signed with Brazilian side Avaí on a one-year contract. After training for a few weeks with Botafogo, he didn't sign with the Glorioso, instead going to the club from Santa Catarina. Maicon came back to Brazilian football after 13 years, after leaving Cruzeiro for AS Monaco. In December 2017, Maicon announced his retirement after spending one season with Avaí who were relegated to Série B.

=== Criciúma ===
On 22 December 2018, Maicon announced he had signed a one-year contract with Série B side Criciúma. Maicon cited his son as one of the reasons for his return to football and his previous history with the club as a youth player.

=== Villa Nova ===
In September 2020, Maicon joined Campeonato Brasileiro Série D side Villa Nova.

=== Sona ===
In January 2021, it was confirmed that Maicon had joined Italian Serie D club Sona on a six-month deal.

=== Tre Penne ===
On 14 June 2021, Maicon joined Sammarinese club Tre Penne. During his month-long stay at the club, he made two appearances in the 2021–22 UEFA Europa Conference League first qualifying round.

=== Retirement ===
On 7 May 2023, Maicon announced his retirement from professional football.

== International career ==
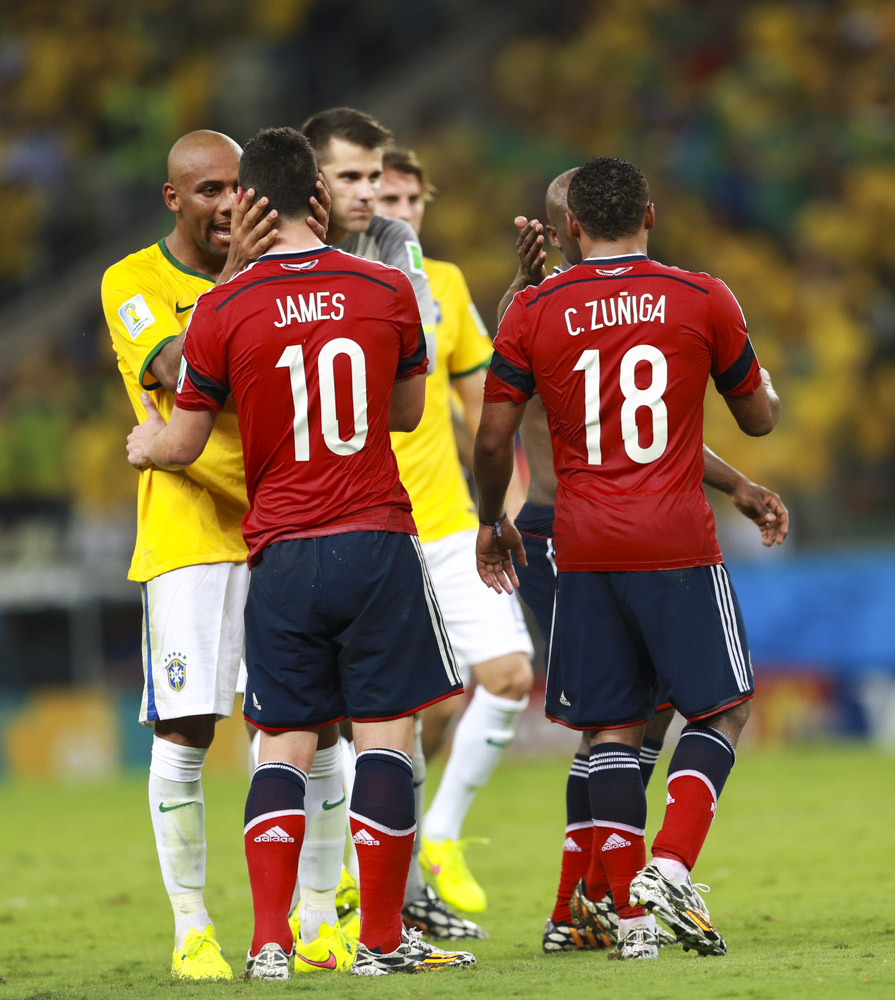
Maicon (left) comforts Colombia midfielder James Rodríguez after their quarter-final loss at the 2014 FIFA World Cup.

After appearing for Brazil's under-20 team at the 2001 FIFA World Youth Championship, Maicon made his senior international debut in the team's opening game of the 2003 CONCACAF Gold Cup against Mexico on 12 July 2003. He was named in the team of the tournament as Brazil finished as runner-up.

He went on to become the first choice right-back for the Seleção, winning the Copa América in 2004 and 2007, and the FIFA Confederations Cup in 2005 and 2009. He appeared in his first FIFA World Cup in 2010 and scored on his tournament debut, a 2–1 win over North Korea.

In June 2014, Maicon was selected in Brazil's squad for the 2014 World Cup. He replaced Dani Alves as the team's starting right-back for the 2–1 quarter-final win against Colombia in Fortaleza and for the remainder of the tournament.

On 7 September 2014, Maicon was dismissed from the Brazil squad for an unspecified "internal problem".

== Style of play ==
Maicon is known for aiding his team both offensively and defensively, and has played both as a full-back and an attacking wing-back or wide midfielder. As a result of his success during his time at Inter Milan, he earned the nickname "Il Colosso" ("The Colossus"), and developed into one of the best attacking full-backs in the world. He formed a notable partnership with teammate Javier Zanetti.

== Personal life ==
Maicon is a great-nephew of former Brazil international footballer Valdomiro.

== Career statistics ==
=== Club ===
Club	Season	League			Cup		Continental		Other		Total	
Club	Season	Division	Apps	Goals	Apps	Goals	Apps	Goals	Apps	Goals	Apps	Goals
Cruzeiro	2000	Série A	0	0	0	0	0	0	2 (Note: Appearances in Copa dos Campeões)	0	2	0
Cruzeiro	2001	Série A	18	0	—		6 (Note: Two appearances in Copa Libertadores, four appearances in Copa Mercosur)	0	9 (Note: Seven appearances in Campeonato Mineiro, two appearances in Copa Sul-Minas)	0	33	0
Cruzeiro	2002	Série A	19	1	5	0	—		26 (Note: 16 appearances and one goal in Copa Sul-Minas, three appearances in Campeonato Mineiro, seven appearances in Copa dos Campeões)	1	50	2
Cruzeiro	2003	Série A	12	0	2	0	2 (Note: Appearances in Copa Sudamericana)	0	1 (Note: Appearance(s) in Campeonato Mineiro)	0	17	0
Cruzeiro	2004	Série A	8	0	—		5 (Note: Appearances in Copa Libertadores)	1	10	0	23	1
Cruzeiro	Total		57	1	7	0	13	1	48	1	125	3
Monaco	2004–05	Ligue 1	30	4	3	0	9 (Note: Appearances in UEFA Champions League)	1	1 (Note: Appearance(s) in Coupe de la Ligue)	0	43	5
Monaco	2005–06	Ligue 1	28	1	0	0	7 (Note: Two appearances in UEFA Champions League, five appearances in UEFA Cup)	1	3	0	38	2
Monaco	Total		58	5	3	0	16	2	4	0	81	7
Inter Milan	2006–07	Serie A	32	2	3	0	8	1	1 (Note: Appearance in Supercoppa Italiana)	0	44	3
Inter Milan	2007–08	Serie A	31	1	3	0	5	0	0	0	39	1
Inter Milan	2008–09	Serie A	29	4	3	0	8	1	1	0	41	5
Inter Milan	2009–10	Serie A	33	6	5	0	13	1	1	0	52	7
Inter Milan	2010–11	Serie A	28	1	4	0	8	0	3 (Note: One appearance in Supercoppa Italiana, one appearance in UEFA Super Cup, one appearance in FIFA Club World Cup)	0	43	1
Inter Milan	2011–12	Serie A	24	2	2	1	3	0	—		29	3
Inter Milan	2012–13	Serie A	0	0	0	0	1 (Note: Appearance in UEFA Europa League)	0	—		1	0
Inter Milan	Total		177	16	20	1	46	3	6	0	249	20
Manchester City	2012–13	Premier League	9	0	1	0	3	0	0	0	13	0
Roma	2013–14	Serie A	28	2	3	0	—		—		31	2
Roma	2014–15	Serie A	14	1	2	0	3	1	—		19	2
Roma	2015–16	Serie A	15	1	1	0	3	0	—		19	1
Roma	Total		57	4	6	0	6	1	—		69	5
Avaí	2017	Série A	9	1	—		—		—		9	1
Criciúma	2019	Série B	13	0	3	0	—		14 (Note: Appearances in Campeonato Catarinense)	0	30	0
Villa Nova	2020	Série D	8	0	—		—		—		8	0
Sona	2020–21	Serie D	17	0	—		—		—		17	0
Tre Penne	2021–22	Campionato Sammarinese di Calcio	1	0	—		2 (Note: Appearances in UEFA Europa Conference League)	0	—		3	0
Career total			406	27	40	1	86	7	72	1	604	36

=== International ===
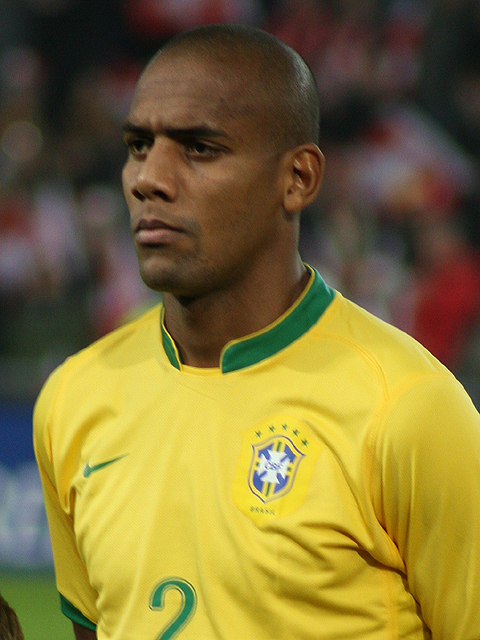
Maicon with Brazil in 2006.

Appearances and goals by national team and year
National team	Year	Apps	Goals
Brazil	2003	5	1
Brazil	2004	6	0
Brazil	2005	2	0
Brazil	2006	5	0
Brazil	2007	15	2
Brazil	2008	9	1
Brazil	2009	13	1
Brazil	2010	8	1
Brazil	2011	3	0
Brazil	2012	0	0
Brazil	2013	3	1
Brazil	2014	6	0
Total		76	7

Brazil score listed first, score column indicates score after each Maicon goal.

International goals by date, venue, cap, opponent, score, result and competition
No.	Date	Venue	Cap	Opponent	Score	Result	Competition
1	14 July 2003	Estadio Azteca, Mexico City, Mexico	2	Honduras	1–0	2–1	2003 CONCACAF Gold Cup
2	10 July 2007	Estadio José Pachencho Romero, Maracaibo, Venezuela	25	Uruguay	1–0	2–2 (aet), 5–4 (pen.)	2007 Copa América
3	22 August 2007	Stade de la Mosson, Montpellier, France	27	Algeria	1–0	2–0	Friendly match
4	20 November 2008	Bezerrão, Gama, Brazil	42	Portugal	3–1	6–2	Friendly match
5	18 June 2009	Loftus Versfeld Stadium, Pretoria, South Africa	45	United States	3–0	3–0	2009 FIFA Confederations Cup
6	15 June 2010	Ellis Park Stadium, Johannesburg, South Africa	59	North Korea	1–0	2–1	2010 FIFA World Cup
7	16 November 2013	Sun Life Stadium, Miami, United States	69	Honduras	3–0	5–0	Friendly match

== Honours ==
Cruzeiro

- Campeonato Brasileiro Série A: 2003
- Copa do Brasil: 2003
- Campeonato Mineiro: 2002, 2003

Inter Milan

- Serie A: 2006–07, 2007–08, 2008–09, 2009–10
- Coppa Italia: 2009–10, 2010–11
- Supercoppa Italiana: 2006, 2008, 2010
- UEFA Champions League: 2009–10
- FIFA Club World Cup: 2010

Brazil

- Copa América: 2004, 2007
- FIFA Confederations Cup: 2005, 2009
- CONCACAF Gold Cup: Runner-up 2003

Individual

- ESM Team of the Year: 2008–09, 2009–10
- 2009 FIFA Confederations Cup: FIFA.com Users' Top 11
- 2010 FIFA World Cup Man of the Match: vs Korea DPR (GM)
- 2010 FIFA World Cup: Dream Team
- UEFA Club Defender of the Year: 2009–10
- FIFA FIFPro World XI: 2010
- UEFA Team of the Year: 2010
- Samba d'Or: 2010
- CONCACAF Gold Cup Best XI: 2003
- Inter Milan Hall of Fame: 2022
