= Jimmy Hebert =

French footballer (born 1972)

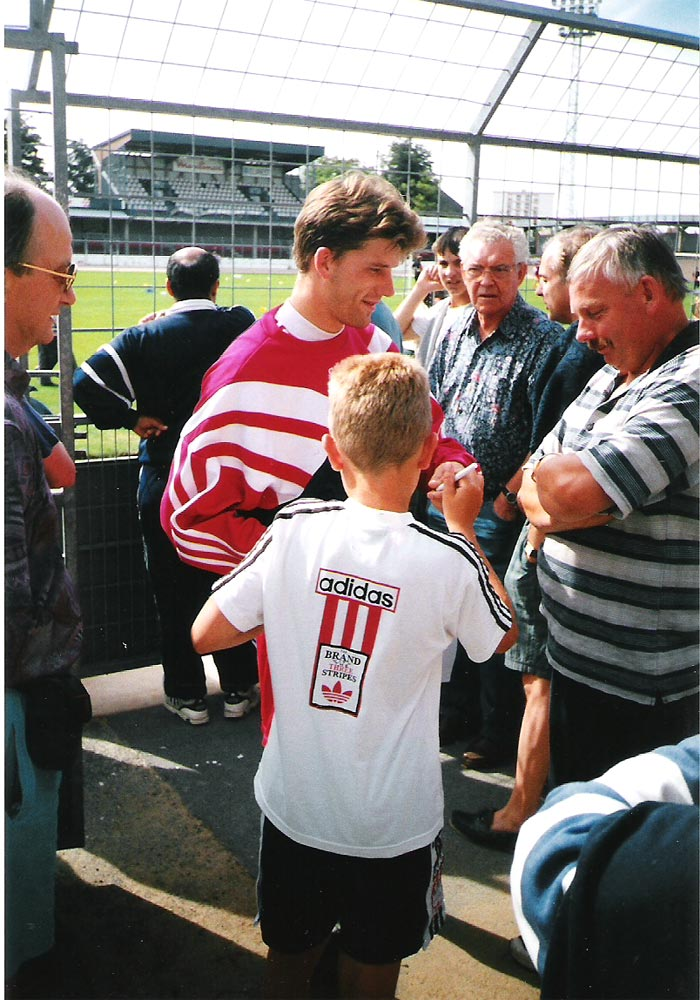
- 1996

Personal information
- Date of birth: 1 July 1972 (age 54)
- Place of birth: Paris, France
- Height: 1.86 m (6 ft 1 in)
- Position: Midfielder

Senior career*
| Years | Team | Apps | (Gls) |
| 1990–1996 | USL Dunkerque | 207 | (8) |
| 1996–2006 | Caen | 321 | (23) |
| Total | | 528 | (31) |
- * Club domestic league appearances and goals

Jimmy Hebert (born 1 July 1972) is a French former professional footballer who played as a midfielder. He was born in Paris, France.

He played on the professional level in Ligue 1 and Ligue 2 for USL Dunkerque and Stade Malherbe Caen.
