= Vincent Planté =

French footballer (born 1980)

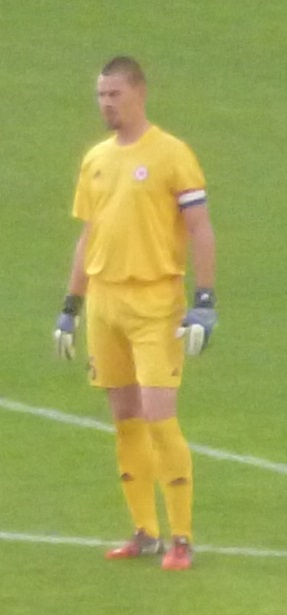
- Vincent Planté in 2015

Personal information
- Date of birth: 19 November 1980 (age 45)
- Place of birth: Lille, France
- Height: 1.90 m (6 ft 3 in)
- Position: Goalkeeper

Team information
- Current team: Chambly (GK coach)

Youth career
- Cannes

Senior career*
Years	Team	Apps	(Gls)
1999–2003	Cannes	68	(0)
2003–2009	Caen	176	(0)
2009–2011	Saint-Étienne	0	(0)
2010–2011	→ Arles-Avignon (loan)	19	(0)
2011–2013	Guingamp	18	(0)
2012–2013	Guingamp B	4	(0)
2013–2016	Red Star	68	(0)
2016–2017	Poissy	15	(0)
2017–2019	Chambly B	2	(0)
2017–2021	Chambly	4	(0)
- * Club domestic league appearances and goals

Vincent Planté (born 19 November 1980) is a French football goalkeeper coach and a former goalkeeper. He works for Chambly.

During his career he played for Cannes, Caen, Saint-Étienne, Arles-Avignon, Guingamp, Red Star, Poissy, and Chambly. After retiring from his playing career in 2017, Planté became the goalkeeper coach for Chambly. On 17 April 2021, 4 years after his retirement, Planté came off the bench as an emergency goalkeeper in a 2–0 win over Amiens SC.
