= Joseph Dayo Oshadogan =

Italian footballer

Personal information
- Date of birth: 27 June 1976 (age 50)
- Place of birth: Genoa, Italy
- Height: 1.82 m (6 ft 0 in)
- Position: Defender

Youth career
- 1993–1994: Pisa
- 1994–1995: Foggia

Senior career*
Years	Team	Apps	(Gls)
1995–1999	Foggia	85	(10)
1999	Roma	0	(0)
1999–2001	Reggina	40	(0)
2001–2003	Cosenza	51	(5)
2003–2005	AS Monaco	4	(0)
2005–2006	Ternana	29	(0)
2007–2008	Widzew Łódź	24	(4)
2008–2010	Virtus Lanciano	36	(6)
Total		289	(25)

International career
1996	Italy U21	3	(0)
- * Club domestic league appearances and goals

Joseph Dayo Oshadogan (born 27 June 1976) is an Italian former professional footballer who played as a defender.

== Club career ==
Oshadogan was born in 1976 in Genoa to a Nigerian father and an Italian mother. He grew up in Pisa, where he spent some time as part of the local team's youth system.

In 1994, he moved to Foggia, where he made his professional debut in the Serie B on 26 August 1995. He played at the club for four seasons, his longest stint at one club in his career.

In 1999, he signed for AS Roma, but left the Giallorossi soon later to join Reggina, where he spent two seasons.

After a two-year spell at Cosenza, in 2003 he joined French side AS Monaco, where he played only four domestic league matches in two seasons.

He then returned to Italy, joining Ternana, which he left following disagreements with the club management.

In May 2007 he joined Widzew Łódź, becoming the team captain, but left the club early in 2008, refusing to return to Poland after having been fined by club management.

Oshadogan ended his career back in Italy at Virtus Lanciano where he stayed for two seasons, from 2008 to 2010.

== International career ==
Oshadogan was also capped three times for the Italian under-21 national team, making him the first coloured player to represent Italy, making his debut for the Azzurrini on 3 October 1996, a 3–0 away win to Moldova.
