= Raphaël Miceli =

Belgian footballer

Personal information
- Date of birth: 30 April 1976 (age 50)
- Place of birth: Belgium
- Positions: Midfielder; winger

Senior career*
Years	Team	Apps	(Gls)
-1996	Royal Football Club Seraing	24	(2)
1996–1997	Standard Liège	25	(0)
1997–1999	RC Strasbourg Alsace	39	(2)
1999–2000	Le Havre AC	8	(0)
2000–2001	S.C. Eendracht Aalst	11	(2)
2001–2002	RFC Liège	24	(4)
2002–2004	R.C.S. Verviétois	24	(4)
2004–2005	Royal Spa Football Club	21	(11)
2005–2006	Royal Football Club Union La Calamine	22	(1)
2006–2009	Royal Racing Club Hamoir	76	(21)
- * Club domestic league appearances and goals

Raphael Miceli (born 30 April 1976 in Belgium) is a Belgian retired footballer.
