= Cyrille Watier =

French footballer (born 1972)

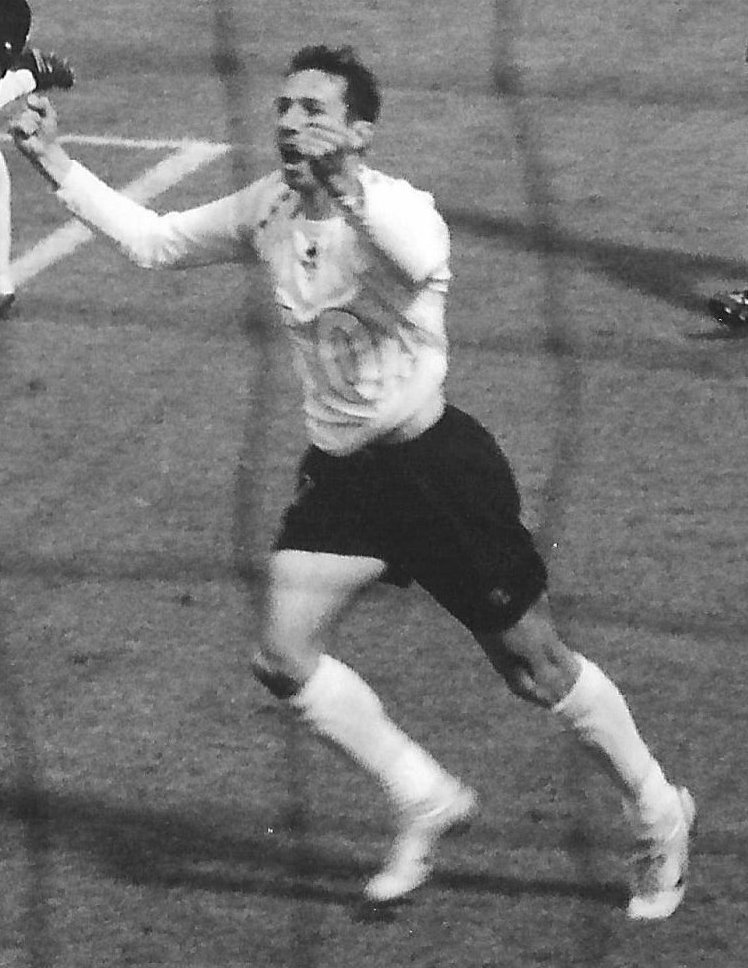

Personal information
- Date of birth: 25 June 1972 (age 54)
- Place of birth: Lorient, France
- Height: 1.78 m (5 ft 10 in)
- Position: Striker

Senior career*
Years	Team	Apps	(Gls)
1994–1998	Lorient	43	(7)
1998–1999	GSI Pontivy	32	(22)
1999–2005	Caen	218	(69)
2005–2006	Guingamp	21	(2)
2006–2007	Laval	34	(9)
Total		348	(101)
- * Club domestic league appearances and goals

Cyrille Watier (born 25 June 1972) is a French former professional footballer who played as a striker.

Watier was Stade Malherbe Caen's top goalscorer with 69 goals in all competitions between 1999 and 2005. He was surpassed by Alexandre Mendy in 2024. In 2007, Watier retired from professional football after suffering an Achilles tendon rupture.
