= Fabien Audard =

French footballer (born 1978)

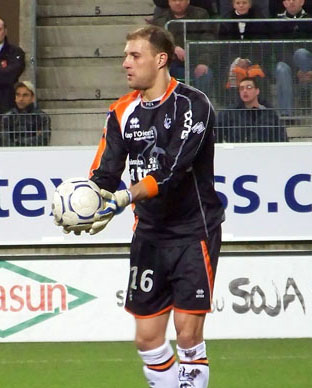
- Audard playing for Lorient in 2008

Personal information
- Date of birth: March 28, 1978 (age 48)
- Place of birth: Toulouse, France
- Height: 1.89 m (6 ft 2 in)
- Position: Goalkeeper

Senior career*
| Years | Team | Apps | (Gls) |
| 1996–2001 | Toulouse | 10 | (0) |
| 2001–2003 | Bastia | 0 | (0) |
| 2002–2003 | → Lorient (loan) | 30 | (0) |
| 2003–2015 | Lorient | 291 | (0) |
| 2004–2005 | → Monaco (loan) | 4 | (0) |
| Total | | 335 | (0) |
- * Club domestic league appearances and goals

Fabien Audard (born March 28, 1978) is a French former professional footballer who played as a goalkeeper.

== Career ==
Born in Toulouse, Haute-Garonne, Midi-Pyrénées, Audard began at his local club Toulouse FC which formed him. He made his debut as a first-half substitute in the Ligue 1 match against Olympique de Marseille on October 3, 1998. Toulouse were already a goal down and eventually lost 2–0. He conceded his first goal to Fabrizio Ravanelli.

Audard made his next appearance on November 4, 2000, playing the full match as Toulouse drew 0–0 with RC Strasbourg. He played four further times that season before moving to SC Bastia in August 2001.

Audard did not play for Bastia in his first season there, and was loaned out to Ligue 2 Lorient for the 2002–03 season, where he played thirty matches. The move was made permanent and the 2003–04 season gave Audard 25 more matches. AS Monaco secured his services on loan for the 2004–05 season, where he played four matches as cover for Flavio Roma.

Returning to Lorient, Audard missed just one match of their 2005–06 promotion campaign.

== Career statistics ==
Appearances and goals by club, season and competition
| Club | Season | League | | | National cup | | League cup | | Europe | | Other | | Total | |
| Club | Season | Division | Apps | Goals | Apps | Goals | Apps | Goals | Apps | Goals | Apps | Goals | Apps | Goals |
|---|---|---|---|---|---|---|---|---|---|---|---|---|---|---|
| Toulouse | 1998–99 | Division 1 | 1 | 0 | 0 | 0 | 0 | 0 | — | | — | | 1 | 0 |
| Toulouse | 1999–2000 | Division 2 | 4 | 0 | 0 | 0 | 3 | 0 | — | | — | | 7 | 0 |
| Toulouse | 2000–01 | Division 1 | 5 | 0 | 0 | 0 | 0 | 0 | — | | — | | 5 | 0 |
| Toulouse | Total | | 10 | 0 | 0 | 0 | 3 | 0 | — | | — | | 13 | 0 |
| Bastia | 2001–02 | Division 1 | 0 | 0 | 0 | 0 | 0 | 0 | — | | — | | 0 | 0 |
| Lorient (loan) | 2002–03 | Ligue 2 | 30 | 0 | 4 | 0 | 1 | 0 | 2 | 0 | — | | 37 | 0 |
| Lorient | 2003–04 | Ligue 2 | 25 | 0 | 2 | 0 | 2 | 0 | — | | — | | 29 | 0 |
| Lorient | 2005–06 | Ligue 2 | 37 | 0 | 3 | 0 | 2 | 0 | — | | — | | 42 | 0 |
| Lorient | 2006–07 | Ligue 1 | 12 | 0 | 0 | 0 | 1 | 0 | — | | — | | 13 | 0 |
| Lorient | 2007–08 | Ligue 1 | 38 | 0 | 2 | 0 | 0 | 0 | — | | — | | 40 | 0 |
| Lorient | 2008–09 | Ligue 1 | 28 | 0 | 1 | 0 | 1 | 0 | — | | — | | 30 | 0 |
| Lorient | 2009–10 | Ligue 1 | 35 | 0 | 1 | 0 | 3 | 0 | — | | — | | 39 | 0 |
| Lorient | 2010–11 | Ligue 1 | 29 | 0 | 4 | 0 | 1 | 0 | — | | — | | 34 | 0 |
| Lorient | 2011–12 | Ligue 1 | 29 | 0 | 1 | 0 | 0 | 0 | — | | — | | 30 | 0 |
| Lorient | 2012–13 | Ligue 1 | 34 | 0 | 0 | 0 | 0 | 0 | — | | — | | 34 | 0 |
| Lorient | 2013–14 | Ligue 1 | 23 | 0 | 1 | 0 | 0 | 0 | — | | — | | 24 | 0 |
| Lorient | 2014–15 | Ligue 1 | 1 | 0 | 0 | 0 | 0 | 0 | — | | — | | 1 | 0 |
| Lorient | Total | | 291 | 0 | 15 | 0 | 10 | 0 | 0 | 0 | — | | 316 | 0 |
| Monaco (loan) | 2004–05 | Ligue 1 | 4 | 0 | 1 | 0 | 3 | 0 | 0 | 0 | — | | 8 | 0 |
| Career total | | | 335 | 0 | 20 | 0 | 17 | 0 | 2 | 0 | 0 | 0 | 374 | 0 |
