= Dino Djiba =

Senegalese footballer

Personal information
- Date of birth: 20 December 1985 (age 40)
- Place of birth: Dakar, Senegal
- Height: 1.88 m (6 ft 2 in)
- Position: Midfielder

Youth career
- 1999–2003: Metz

Senior career*
Years	Team	Apps	(Gls)
2003–2009	Metz	56	(2)
2008–2009	Gondomar		
2010	FC Homburg		
2010–2011	CS Blénod et Pont-à-Mousson		
2011–2012	Thionville		

International career
2004–2006	Senegal	5	(0)
- * Club domestic league appearances and goals

Dino Djiba (born 20 December 1985) is a Senegalese former professional footballer who played as a midfielder.

== International career ==
Represented the national team at the 2006 Africa Cup of Nations, where his team took 4th place for the third time in history.

== Career statistics ==
=== International ===
Appearances and goals by national team and year
National team	Year	Apps	Goals
Senegal	2004	2	0
Senegal	2005	0	0
Senegal	2006	3	0
Total		5	0
