= Steve Dugardein =

Belgian footballer

Personal information
- Date of birth: 28 January 1974 (age 52)
- Place of birth: Mouscron, Belgium
- Height: 1.82 m (6 ft 0 in)
- Position: Midfielder

Senior career*
Years	Team	Apps	(Gls)
1996–2004	Mouscron		
2004–2005	Caen	20	(0)
2005–2008	Mouscron	89	(4)
2008–2009	OH Leuven	14	(0)

Managerial career
- 2013–2015: Mouscron (youth)
- 2015: AC Estaimbourg
- 2015–2016: RFC Tournai (assistant)
- * Club domestic league appearances and goals

Steve Dugardein (born 28 January 1974 in Mouscron, Belgium) is a Belgian former professional footballer who played as a midfielder.
