= 2010–11 AS Monaco FC season =

AS Monaco FC
2010–11 season
- President: Étienne Franzi
- Head coach: Guy Lacomber (until 10 January); Laurent Banide (from 10 January)
- Stadium: Stade Louis II
- Ligue 1: 18th (relegated)
- Coupe de France: Round of 64
- Coupe de la Ligue: Quarter-finals
- Top goalscorer: League: Park Chu-young (12); All: Park Chu-young (12)
- Average home league attendance: 6,517
Home colours	Away colours	Third colours

During the 2010–11 French football season, AS Monaco competed in Ligue 1.

== First-team squad ==
Squad at end of season

Note: Flags indicate national team as defined under FIFA eligibility rules; some limited exceptions apply. Players may hold more than one non-FIFA nationality.

No.	Pos.	Nation	Player
1	GK	FRA	Sébastien Chabbert
2	DF	FRA	Dennis Appiah
3	DF	CMR	Nicolas N'Koulou
4	DF	COD	Cédric Mongongu
5	DF	FRA	Laurent Bonnart
6	MF	MLI	Mahamadou Diarra
7	MF	CGO	Chris Malonga (Note: Malonga was born in Sens, France.)
9	FW	HON	Georgie Welcome (on loan from Motagua)
10	FW	KOR	Park Chu-young
11	FW	CMR	Benjamin Moukandjo
12	DF	BRA	Adriano
13	DF	SWE	Petter Hansson
14	MF	GUI	Pascal Feindouno
15	MF	FRA	Thomas Mangani
16	GK	FRA	Stéphane Ruffier (captain)
18	DF	MLI	Djimi Traoré (Note: Traoré was born in Saint-Ouen, France.)
19	MF	CIV	Jean-Jacques Gosso

No.	Pos.	Nation	Player
20	MF	FRA	Mathieu Coutadeur
21	FW	ROU	Daniel Niculae
22	MF	GAB	Frédéric Bulot
23	DF	FRA	Vincent Muratori
24	MF	FRA	Nampalys Mendy
25	MF	NGR	Lukman Haruna
26	FW	FRA	Kévin Malcuit
27	MF	FRA	Grégory Lacombe (on loan from Montpellier)
28	DF	FRA	Sébastien Puygrenier (on loan from Zenit)
29	DF	FRA	Layvin Kurzawa
30	GK	FRA	Franck L'Hostis
31	FW	NIG	Moussa Maâzou (on loan from CSKA Moscow)
32	DF	CIV	Igor Lolo
33	FW	FRA	Terence Makengo
33	FW	FRA	Valère Germain
—	MF	FRA	Loïc Dufau

=== Out on loan ===
Note: Flags indicate national team as defined under FIFA eligibility rules; some limited exceptions apply. Players may hold more than one non-FIFA nationality.

No.	Pos.	Nation	Player
14	FW	CIV	Yannick Sagbo (Note: Sagbo was born in Marseille, France.) (on loan to Evian)
27	MF	FRA	Frédéric Nimani (on loan to Nantes)
—	GK	FRA	Yohann Thuram-Ulien (on loan to Tours)
—	DF	FRA	Yvan Erichot (on loan to Clermont)
—	MF	FRA	Kévin Diaz (on loan to Metz)

No.	Pos.	Nation	Player
—	MF	BRA	Eduardo Costa (on loan to Vasco da Gama)
—	MF	COD	Distel Zola (on loan to Laval)
—	MF	FRA	Yohan Mollo (on loan to Caen)
—	FW	COD	Dieumerci Mbokani (on loan to VfL Wolfsburg)

== Transfers ==
=== Summer ===
In: Note: Flags indicate national team as defined under FIFA eligibility rules; some limited exceptions apply. Players may hold more than one non-FIFA nationality.

No.	Pos.	Nation	Player
9	FW	COD	Dieumerci Mbokani (from (Belgium) Standard Liège)
11	FW	GAB	Pierre-Emerick Aubameyang (loan from (Italy) Milan)
21	FW	ROU	Daniel Niculae (from (France) Auxerre)

Out: Note: Flags indicate national team as defined under FIFA eligibility rules; some limited exceptions apply. Players may hold more than one non-FIFA nationality.

No.	Pos.	Nation	Player
5	MF	URU	Diego Pérez (to (Italy) Bologna)
7	FW	ISL	Eiður Guðjohnsen (to (England) Stoke City)
8	MF	ARG	Alejandro Alonso (to (France) Saint-Étienne)
11	MF	BRA	Nenê (to (France) Paris Saint-Germain)
19	DF	SUI	Patrick Müller (retired)
20	MF	COL	Juan Pablo Pino (to (Turkey) Galatasaray)
25	MF	CRO	Jerko Leko (to (Turkey) Bucaspor)
—	DF	SEN	Massamba Sambou (to (Greece) Atromitos)

=== Winter ===
In: Note: Flags indicate national team as defined under FIFA eligibility rules; some limited exceptions apply. Players may hold more than one non-FIFA nationality.

No.	Pos.	Nation	Player
6	MF	MLI	Mahamadou Diarra (from (Spain) Real Madrid)
9	FW	HON	Georgie Welcome (from (Honduras) Motagua)
11	FW	CMR	Benjamin Moukandjo (from (France) Nîmes)
14	MF	GUI	Pascal Feindouno (from (Qatar) Al Sadd)
31	FW	NIG	Moussa Maâzou (loan from (Russia) CSKA Moscow)

Out: Note: Flags indicate national team as defined under FIFA eligibility rules; some limited exceptions apply. Players may hold more than one non-FIFA nationality.

No.	Pos.	Nation	Player
6	MF	BRA	Eduardo Costa (loan to (Brazil) Vasco da Gama)
9	FW	COD	Dieumerci Mbokani (loan to (Germany) VfL Wolfsburg)
11	FW	GAB	Pierre-Emerick Aubameyang (loan return to (Italy) Milan)
17	FW	TOG	Serge Gakpé (to (France) Nantes)

== Competitions ==
=== Ligue 1 ===
==== League table ====
Pos	Team	Pld	W	D	L	GF	GA	GD	Pts	Qualification or relegation
16	Brest	38	11	13	14	36	43	−7	46	
17	Nice	38	11	13	14	33	48	−15	46	
18	Monaco (R)	38	9	17	12	36	40	−4	44	Relegation to Ligue 2
19	Lens (R)	38	7	14	17	35	58	−23	35	Relegation to Ligue 2
20	Arles-Avignon (R)	38	3	11	24	21	70	−49	20	Relegation to Ligue 2

Source: Ligue 1
Rules for classification: 1) points; 2) goal difference; 3) number of goals scored.
(R) Relegated

==== Results summary ====
Overall								Home						Away					
Pld	W	D	L	GF	GA	GD	Pts	W	D	L	GF	GA	GD	W	D	L	GF	GA	GD
38	9	17	12	36	40	−4	44	5	9	5	16	17	−1	4	8	7	20	23	−3

==== Results by round ====
Round	1	2	3	4	5	6	7	8	9	10	11	12	13	14	15	16	17	18	19	20	21	22	23	24	25	26	27	28	29	30	31	32	33	34	35	36	37	38
Ground	A	H	A	H	A	H	A	H	A	H	H	A	H	A	H	A	H	A	H	A	H	A	H	A	H	A	A	H	A	H	A	H	A	H	A	H	A	H
Result	D	D	D	W	D	D	L	L	D	L	D	W	D	L	D	L	L	D	W	D	D	L	W	L	D	D	W	L	W	W	L	W	D	D	L	D	W	L
Position	13	14	15	7	9	10	12	15	16	18	18	18	16	17	17	17	17	18	17	19	19	19	18	18	18	18	17	18	18	16	17	15	14	15	17	18	18	18

Source: Ligue 1
A = Away; H = Home; W = Win; D = Draw; L = Loss

==== Results ====
7 August 2010 1	Lyon	0 – 0	Monaco	Lyon
20:00 CEST (UTC+2)		Summary		Stadium: Stade de Gerland; Attendance: 35,275; Referee: Lionel Jaffredo

17 August 2010 2	Monaco	0 – 0	Montpellier	Fontvieille
19:00 CEST (UTC+2)		Summary		Stadium: Stade Louis II; Attendance: 8,917; Referee: Philippe Kalt

21 August 2010 3	Lens	2 – 2	Monaco	Lens
19:00 CEST (UTC+2)	Adriano 73' (o.g.); Roudet 83'	Summary	Niculae 19'; Aubameyang 69'	Stadium: Stade Bollaert-Delelis; Attendance: 32,905; Referee: Laurent Duhamel

29 August 2010 4	Monaco	2 – 0	Auxerre	Fontvieille
17:00 CEST (UTC+2)	Niculae 52'; Aubameyang 59'	Summary		Stadium: Stade Louis II; Attendance: 6,677; Referee: Herve Piccirillo

12 September 2010 5	Marseille	2 – 2	Monaco	Marseille
21:00 CEST (UTC+2)	Valbuena 42'; Adriano 81' (o.g.)	Summary	Niculae 15'; Park 79'	Stadium: Stade Vélodrome; Attendance: 49,384; Referee: Stephane Lannoy

18 September 2010 6	Monaco	0 – 0	Toulouse	Fontvieille
19:00 CEST (UTC+2)		Summary		Stadium: Stade Louis II; Attendance: 6,070; Referee: Fredy Fautrel

25 September 2010 7	Lorient	2 – 1	Monaco	Lorient
19:00 CEST (UTC+2)	Gameiro 6'; Kitambala 89'	Summary	Mbokani 26'; Puygrenier (red card) 45'	Stadium: Stade du Moustoir; Attendance: 16,018; Referee: Wilfried Bien

2 October 2010 8	Monaco	0 – 1	Brest	Fontvieille
19:00 CEST (UTC+2)		Summary	Grougi 71'	Stadium: Stade Louis II; Attendance: 5,431; Referee: Sebastien Moreira

16 October 2010 9	Caen	0 – 0	Monaco	Caen
19:00 CEST (UTC+2)		Summary		Stadium: Stade Michel d'Ornano; Attendance: 16,285; Referee: Bartolomeu Varela

23 October 2010 10	Monaco	0 – 2	Valenciennes	Fontvieille
19:00 CEST (UTC+2)		Summary	Pujol 32', 52'	Stadium: Stade Louis II; Attendance: 5,121; Referee: Alain Hamer

2 November 2010 (Note: The match was originally scheduled for 31 October 2010 but postponed due to heavy rain.) 11	Monaco	2 – 2	Bordeaux	Fontvieille
19:00 CET (UTC+1)	Park 49'; Coutadeur 64'; Coutadeur (yellow card) 31' (yellow-red card) 84'	Summary	Traoré 10' (o.g.); Jussiê 74'	Stadium: Stade Louis II; Attendance: 5,023; Referee: Stephane Lannoy

7 November 2010 12	Nancy	0 – 4	Monaco	Tomblaine
17:00 CET (UTC+1)		Summary	Malonga 55', 62'; Park 81', 87'	Stadium: Stade Marcel Picot; Attendance: 14,745; Referee: Antony Gautier

13 November 2010 13	Monaco	0 – 0	Arles-Avignon	Fontvieille
19:00 CET (UTC+1)		Summary		Stadium: Stade Louis II; Attendance: 5,161; Referee: Ruddy Buquet

21 November 2010 14	Lille	2 – 1	Monaco	Villeneuve-d'Ascq
17:00 CET (UTC+1)	Frau 39'; Obraniak 78'	Summary	Adriano 57'	Stadium: Grand Stade Lille Métropole; Attendance: 16,454; Referee: Stephane Bre

27 November 2010 15	Monaco	1 – 1	Nice	Fontvieille
19:00 CET (UTC+1)	Park 78' (pen.)	Summary	Diakité (red card) 26'; Mouloungui 85'	Stadium: Stade Louis II; Attendance: 9,134; Referee: Tony Chapron

4 December 2010 16	Rennes	1 – 0	Monaco	Rennes
19:00 CET (UTC+1)	Montaño 64' (pen.)	Summary		Stadium: Stade de la Route de Lorient; Attendance: 20,829; Referee: Olivier Thual

12 December 2010 17	Monaco	0 – 2	Saint-Étienne	Fontvieille
17:00 CET (UTC+1)		Summary	Batlles 20'; Sako 78'	Stadium: Stade Louis II; Attendance: 6,694; Referee: Bartolmeu Varela

18 December 2010 18	Paris Saint-Germain	2 – 2	Monaco	Paris
21:00 CET (UTC+1)	Nenê 40', 52'	Summary	Puygrenier 32'; Niculae 88'	Stadium: Parc des Princes; Attendance: 32,842; Referee: Lionel Jaffredo

22 December 2010 19	Monaco	2 – 1	Sochaux	Fontvieille
19:00 CET (UTC+1)	Malonga 8'; Park 90+3'	Summary	Lolo 48' (o.g.); Maïga (red card) 90'	Stadium: Stade Louis II; Attendance: 4,984; Referee: Nicolas Rainville

15 January 2011 20	Auxerre	1 – 1	Monaco	Auxerre
21:00 CET (UTC+1)	Quercia 26'	Summary	Adriano 71'	Stadium: Stade de l'Abbé-Deschamps; Attendance: 9,319; Referee: Stephane Lannoy

30 January 2011 21	Monaco	0 – 0	Marseille	Fontvieille
21:00 CET (UTC+1)		Summary		Stadium: Stade Louis II; Attendance: 10,959; Referee: Said Ennjimi

6 February 2011 22	Toulouse	2 – 0	Monaco	Toulouse
17:00 CET (UTC+1)	Sissoko 48', 76'	Summary		Stadium: Stadium Municipal; Attendance: 24,662; Referee: Jean Cailleux

12 February 2011 23	Monaco	3 – 1	Lorient	Fontvieille
19:00 CET (UTC+1)	Lolo 3'; Mangani 56'; Park 90+4'	Summary	Gameiro 22'; Morel (red card) 90+3'	Stadium: Stade Louis II; Attendance: 4,921; Referee: Herve Piccirillo

19 February 2011 24	Brest	2 – 0	Monaco	Brest
19:00 CET (UTC+1)	Ayité 14', 89' (pen.)	Summary	Adriano (yellow card) 49' (yellow-red card) 89'	Stadium: Stade Francis-Le Blé; Attendance: 13,271; Referee: Sebastien Moreira

26 February 2011 25	Monaco	2 – 2	Caen	Fontvieille
19:00 CET (UTC+1)	Park 35' (pen.), 62'	Summary	El-Arabi; Mollo; Sorbon (yellow card) 25' (yellow-red card) 83'	Stadium: Stade Louis II; Attendance: 5,142; Referee: Lionel Jaffredo

5 March 2011 26	Valenciennes	0 – 0	Monaco	Valenciennes
CET (UTC+1)		Summary		Stadium: Stade du Hainaut; Attendance: 11,859; Referee: Alban Hung

13 March 2011 27	Bordeaux	0 – 1	Monaco	Bordeaux
17:00 CET (UTC+1)		Summary	Adriano 22'	Stadium: Stade Chaban-Delmas; Attendance: 26,811; Referee: Laurent Duhamel

20 March 2011 28	Monaco	0 – 1	Nancy	Fontvieille
17:00 CET (UTC+1)		Summary	André Luiz 20'	Stadium: Stade Louis II; Attendance: 5,446; Referee: Nicolas Rainville

2 April 2011 29	Arles-Avignon	0 – 2	Monaco	Avignon
19:00 CEST (UTC+2)	Lorenzi (red card) 2'	Summary	Moukandjo 30'; Park 66'	Stadium: Parc des Sports; Attendance: 9,203; Referee: Tony Chapron

9 April 2011 30	Monaco	1 – 0	Lille	Fontvieille
19:00 CEST (UTC+2)	Park 12'	Summary	Gervinho (red card) 38'	Stadium: Stade Louis II; Attendance: 7,986; Referee: Olivier Thual

16 April 2011 31	Nice	3 – 2	Monaco	Nice
19:00 CEST (UTC+2)	Mounier 21'; Civelli 46'; Mouloungui 60'	Summary	Gosso 29'; Park 76' (pen.)	Stadium: Stade Municipal du Ray; Attendance: 8,988; Referee: Clement Turpin

24 April 2011 32	Monaco	1 – 0	Rennes	Fontvieille
17:00 CEST (UTC+2)	Welcome 73'	Summary		Stadium: Stade Louis II; Attendance: 6,569; Referee: Fredy Fautrel

1 May 2011 33	Saint-Étienne	1 – 1	Monaco	Saint Étienne
21:00 CEST (UTC+2)	Payet 12'	Summary	Welcome 31'; Kurzawa (yellow card) 26' (yellow-red card) 60'	Stadium: Stade Geoffroy-Guichard; Attendance: 23,656; Referee: Stephane Lannoy

7 May 2011 34	Monaco	1 – 1	Paris Saint-Germain	Fontvieille
19:00 CEST (UTC+2)	Adriano 25'	Summary	Erdinç 51'	Stadium: Stade Louis II; Attendance: 9,338; Referee: Antony Gautier

11 May 2011 35	Sochaux	3 – 0	Monaco	Montbéliard
19:00 CEST (UTC+2)	Sauget 21'; Maïga 23'; Boudebouz 84'	Summary		Stadium: Stade Auguste Bonal; Attendance: 14,524; Referee: Wilfried Bien

15 May 2011 36	Monaco	1 – 1	Lens	Fontvieille
17:00 CEST (UTC+2)	Moukandjo 14'	Summary	Varane 90+3'	Stadium: Stade Louis II; Attendance: 6,444; Referee: Herve Piccirillo

21 May 2011 37	Montpellier	0 – 1	Monaco	Montpellier
21:00 CEST (UTC+2)		Summary	Moukandjo 56'	Stadium: Stade de la Mosson; Attendance: 17,998; Referee: Sebastien Moreira

29 May 2011 38	Monaco	0 – 2	Lyon	Fontvieille
21:00 CEST (UTC+2)		Summary	Diakhaté 67'; López 83'	Stadium: Stade Louis II; Attendance: 11,140; Referee: Laurent Duhamel

=== Coupe de la Ligue ===
22 September 2010 Third Round	Monaco	1 – 0	Lens	Fontvieille
18:00 CEST (UTC+2)	Niculae 83' (pen.)	Summary; Summary		Stadium: Stade Louis II; Attendance: 4,661; Referee: Jean-Charles Cailleux

26 October 2010 Round of 16	Monaco	1 – 1 (a.e.t.) (5 – 3 p)	Lorient	Fontvieille
20:00 CEST (UTC+2)	Hansson 99'	Summary; Summary	Diarra 118'	Stadium: Stade Louis II; Attendance: 4,889; Referee: Tony Chapron
	Penalties
	Park (penalty scored); Gakpé (penalty scored); Mongongu (penalty scored); Coutadeur (penalty scored); Mbokani (penalty scored)		(penalty missed) Le Lan; (penalty scored) Monnet-Paquet; (penalty scored) Gameiro; (penalty scored) Amalfitano

10 November 2010 Quarterfinals	Marseille	2 – 1	Monaco	Marseille
20:45CET (UTC+1)	A. Ayew 42'; Azpilicueta 60'	Summary; Summary	Coutadeur 22' (pen.)	Stadium: Stade Vélodrome; Attendance: 17,765; Referee: Clément Turpin

=== Coupe de France ===
8 January 2011 Round of 64	Chambéry	1 – 1 (a.e.t.) (3 – 2 p)	Monaco	Chambéry
15:00 CET (UTC+1)	Dubard 5'	Summary; Summary	Malonga 19'	Stadium: Stade Jaques Level; Attendance: 3,500; Referee: Pascal Vileo
	Penalties
	Tissot-Rosset (penalty scored); Pérez (penalty missed); Chmielinski (penalty missed); Yahia Bey (penalty scored); Sahinović (penalty scored)		(penalty missed) Niculae; (penalty scored) Lolo; (penalty missed) Gosso; (penalty missed) Puygrenier; (penalty scored) Bonnart

== Squad statistics ==
=== Appearances and goals ===
No.	Pos	Nat	Player	Total		Ligue 1		Coupe de France		Coupe de la Ligue	
No.	Pos	Nat	Player	Apps	Goals	Apps	Goals	Apps	Goals	Apps	Goals
1	GK	(France) FRA	Sébastien Chabbert	6	0	4+2	0	0	0	0	0
3	DF	(Cameroon) CMR	Nicolas N'Koulou	33	0	26+4	0	0+1	0	2	0
4	DF	(Democratic Republic of the Congo) COD	Cédric Mongongu	22	0	14+5	0	0	0	3	0
5	DF	(France) FRA	Laurent Bonnart	28	0	24+1	0	1	0	2	0
6	MF	(Mali) MLI	Mahamadou Diarra	9	0	9	0	0	0	0	0
7	MF	(Republic of the Congo) CGO	Chris Malonga	20	4	9+7	3	1	1	3	0
9	FW	(Honduras) HON	Georgie Welcome	14	2	5+8	2	0	0	0+1	0
10	FW	(South Korea) KOR	Park Chu-young	35	12	32+1	12	0	0	2	0
11	FW	(Cameroon) CMR	Benjamin Moukandjo	15	3	13+2	3	0	0	0	0
12	DF	(Brazil) BRA	Adriano	34	4	32	4	0	0	0+2	0
13	DF	(Sweden) SWE	Petter Hansson	34	1	28+2	0	1	0	3	1
14	MF	(Guinea) GUI	Pascal Feindouno	5	0	2+3	0	0	0	0	0
15	MF	(France) FRA	Thomas Mangani	25	1	20+4	1	1	0	0	0
16	GK	(France) FRA	Stéphane Ruffier	38	0	34	0	1	0	3	0
18	DF	(Mali) MLI	Djimi Traoré	8	0	5+2	0	0	0	1	0
19	MF	(Ivory Coast) CIV	Jean-Jacques Gosso	24	1	18+4	1	1	0	1	0
20	MF	(France) FRA	Mathieu Coutadeur	21	2	11+7	1	0	0	2+1	1
21	FW	(Romania) ROU	Daniel Niculae	19	5	13+4	4	1	0	1	1
22	MF	(Gabon) GAB	Frédéric Bulot	12	0	3+5	0	0+1	0	1+2	0
23	DF	(France) FRA	Vincent Muratori	17	0	14+3	0	0	0	0	0
24	MF	(France) FRA	Nampalys Mendy	15	0	13+1	0	0	0	1	0
25	MF	(Nigeria) NGR	Lukman Haruna	19	0	12+5	0	0+1	0	1	0
26	FW	(France) FRA	Kévin Malcuit	1	0	0+1	0	0	0	0	0
27	MF	(France) FRA	Grégory Lacombe	8	0	4+4	0	0	0	0	0
28	DF	(France) FRA	Sébastien Puygrenier	33	1	28+3	1	1	0	1	0
29	DF	(France) FRA	Layvin Kurzawa	6	0	5	0	0	0	1	0
31	FW	(Niger) NIG	Moussa Maâzou	1	0	0+1	0	0	0	0	0
32	DF	(Ivory Coast) CIV	Igor Lolo	20	1	9+9	1	1	0	1	0
33	FW	(France) FRA	Terence Makengo	1	0	0	0	0	0	0+1	0
33	FW	(France) FRA	Valère Germain	3	0	0+2	0	0	0	0+1	0
Players away from Monaco on loan:
14	FW	(Ivory Coast) CIV	Yannick Sagbo	1	0	0+1	0	0	0	0	0
Players who appeared for Monaco no longer at the club:
8	MF	(Argentina) ARG	Alejandro Alonso	4	0	3+1	0	0	0	0	0
9	FW	(Democratic Republic of the Congo) COD	Dieumerci Mbokani	11	1	9+1	1	0	0	0+1	0
11	FW	(Gabon) GAB	Pierre-Emerick Aubameyang	23	2	17+2	2	1	0	2+1	0
17	FW	(Togo) TOG	Serge Gakpé	14	0	2+8	0	1	0	2+1	0

=== Top scorers ===
Place	Position	Nation	Number	Name	Ligue 1	Coupe de France	Coupe de la Ligue	Total
1	FW	(South Korea)	10	Park Chu-young	12	0	0	12
2	FW	(Romania)	21	Daniel Niculae	4	0	1	5
3	DF	(Brazil)	12	Adriano	4	0	0	4
3	MF	(Republic of the Congo)	7	Chris Malonga	3	1	0	4
5	FW	(Cameroon)	11	Benjamin Moukandjo	3	0	0	3
6	FW	(Honduras)	9	Georgie Welcome	2	0	0	2
6	FW	(Gabon)	11	Pierre-Emerick Aubameyang	2	0	0	2
6	MF	(France)	20	Mathieu Coutadeur	1	0	1	2
9	FW	(Democratic Republic of the Congo)	9	Dieumerci Mbokani	1	0	0	1
9	MF	(France)	15	Thomas Mangani	1	0	0	1
9	MF	(Ivory Coast)	19	Jean-Jacques Gosso	1	0	0	1
9	DF	(France)	28	Sébastien Puygrenier	1	0	0	1
9	DF	(Ivory Coast)	32	Igor Lolo	1	0	0	1
9	DF	(Sweden)	13	Petter Hansson	0	0	1	1
				TOTALS	36	1	3	40

=== Disciplinary record ===
Number	Nation	Position	Name	Ligue 2		Coupe de France		Coupe de la Ligue		Total	
Number	Nation	Position	Name	Yellow card	Red card	Yellow card	Red card	Yellow card	Red card	Yellow card	Red card
3	(Cameroon)	DF	Nicolas N'Koulou	7	0	1	0	1	0	9	0
4	(Democratic Republic of the Congo)	DF	Cédric Mongongu	0	0	0	0	1	0	1	0
6	(Mali)	MF	Mahamadou Diarra	3	0	0	0	0	0	3	0
7	(Republic of the Congo)	MF	Chris Malonga	1	0	0	0	0	0	1	0
8	(Argentina)	MF	Alejandro Alonso	3	0	0	0	0	0	3	0
9	(Democratic Republic of the Congo)	FW	Dieumerci Mbokani	3	0	0	0	0	0	3	0
9	(Honduras)	FW	Georgie Welcome	1	0	0	0	0	0	1	0
10	(South Korea)	FW	Park Chu-young	3	0	0	0	0	0	3	0
11	(Gabon)	FW	Pierre-Emerick Aubameyang	1	0	0	0	0	0	1	0
11	(Cameroon)	FW	Benjamin Moukandjo	2	0	0	0	0	0	2	0
12	(Brazil)	DF	Adriano	12	1	0	0	0	0	12	1
13	(Sweden)	DF	Petter Hansson	1	0	0	0	0	0	1	0
15	(France)	MF	Thomas Mangani	6	0	0	0	0	0	6	0
16	(France)	GK	Stéphane Ruffier	3	0	0	0	0	0	3	0
17	(Togo)	FW	Serge Gakpé	1	0	0	0	1	0	2	0
18	(Mali)	DF	Djimi Traoré	1	0	0	0	0	0	1	0
19	(Ivory Coast)	MF	Jean-Jacques Gosso	4	0	0	0	0	0	4	0
20	(France)	MF	Mathieu Coutadeur	1	1	0	0	0	0	1	1
21	(Romania)	FW	Daniel Niculae	2	0	0	0	0	0	2	0
22	(Gabon)	MF	Frédéric Bulot	1	0	0	0	0	0	1	0
23	(France)	DF	Vincent Muratori	4	0	0	0	0	0	4	0
24	(France)	MF	Nampalys Mendy	3	0	0	0	0	0	3	0
25	(Nigeria)	MF	Lukman Haruna	3	0	0	0	0	0	3	0
28	(France)	DF	Sébastien Puygrenier	7	1	0	0	0	0	7	1
29	(France)	DF	Layvin Kurzawa	3	1	0	0	0	0	3	1
32	(Ivory Coast)	DF	Igor Lolo	6	0	0	0	1	0	7	0
33	(France)	FW	Terence Makengo	0	0	0	0	1	0	1	0
			TOTALS	79	4	1	0	5	0	85	4
