= 2008–09 AS Monaco FC season =

AS Monaco
2008–09 season
- President: Jérôme de Bontin
- Head coach: Ricardo Gomes
- Stadium: Stade Louis II
- Ligue 1: 11th
- Coupe de la Ligue: Round of 32 (vs. Lens)
- Coupe de France: Round of 32 (vs. Marseille)
- Top goalscorer: League: Alexandre Licata (7); All: Alexandre Licata (9)
Home colours

The 2008–09 season was AS Monaco FC's 52nd season in Ligue 1. They finished eleventh in Ligue 1, and were knocked out of the Coupe de la Ligue by RC Lens, in the Round of 32, and the Coupe de France by Marseille in the Round of 32.

== Squad ==
Note: Flags indicate national team as defined under FIFA eligibility rules; some limited exceptions apply. Players may hold more than one non-FIFA nationality.

No.	Pos.	Nation	Player
1	GK	FRA	Yohann Thuram-Ulien
2	DF	COD	Cédric Mongongu
3	DF	CMR	Nicolas Nkoulou
4	DF	FRA	François Modesto (vice-captain)
5	MF	URU	Diego Pérez
6	MF	CRO	Nikola Pokrivač
8	DF	SUI	Patrick Müller
9	FW	FRA	Yannick Sagbo
10	FW	KOR	Park Chu-young
11	FW	USA	Freddy Adu (on loan from Benfica)
12	DF	BRA	Adriano
13	DF	FRA	Vincent Muratori
14	DF	CRO	Dario Šimić (vice-captain)
15	DF	FRA	Thomas Mangani
16	GK	FRA	Stéphane Ruffier
17	FW	FRA	Serge Gakpé
18	MF	ARG	Alejandro Alonso

No.	Pos.	Nation	Player
19	MF	CIV	Jean-Jacques Gosso
20	FW	COL	Juan Pablo Pino
21	MF	FRA	Camel Meriem
22	FW	FRA	Alexandre Licata
23	MF	CRO	Jerko Leko
24	MF	FRA	Loïc Dufau
25	MF	NGR	Lukman Haruna
26	MF	FRA	Yohan Mollo
27	FW	FRA	Frédéric Nimani
28	FW	FRA	Djamel Bakar
29	MF	FRA	Distel Zola
30	GK	ITA	Flavio Roma (captain)
31	MF	FRA	Kevin Diaz
32	DF	CIV	Igor Lolo
40	GK	FRA	Ludovic Guimera
—	GK	MON	Manuel Vallaurio

=== Out on loan ===
Note: Flags indicate national team as defined under FIFA eligibility rules; some limited exceptions apply. Players may hold more than one non-FIFA nationality.

No.	Pos.	Nation	Player
11	FW	BRA	Nenê (at Espanyol)
14	MF	FRA	Malaury Martin (at Nimes)
22	DF	BRA	Bolívar (at Internacional)
25	DF	ARG	Leandro Cufré (at Hertha Berlin)
26	DF	SEN	Massamba Sambou (at Le Havre)

No.	Pos.	Nation	Player
27	DF	FRA	Arnaud Lescure (at Rodez)
34	DF	GER	Torben Joneleit (at Charleroi)
35	MF	NGR	Sani Kaita (at Kuban Krasnodar)
—	FW	FRA	Vincent Ramaël (at Tubize)
—	FW	URU	Gonzalo Vargas (at Atlas)

== Transfers ==
=== Summer ===
In: Note: Flags indicate national team as defined under FIFA eligibility rules; some limited exceptions apply. Players may hold more than one non-FIFA nationality.

No.	Pos.	Nation	Player
8	DF	SUI	Patrick Müller (from (France) Lyon)
10	FW	KOR	Park Chu-young (from (South Korea) FC Seoul)
11	FW	USA	Freddy Adu (loan from (Portugal) Benfica)
14	DF	CRO	Dario Šimić (from (Italy) A.C. Milan)
15	MF	FRA	Thomas Mangani (loan return from (France) Ajaccio)
18	MF	ARG	Alejandro Alonso (from (France) Bordeaux)
19	MF	CIV	Jean-Jacques Gosso (from (Israel) Ashdod)
20	MF	COL	Juan Pablo Pino (loan return from (Belgium) R. Charleroi)
22	FW	FRA	Alexandre Licata (loan return from (France) Bastia)
27	FW	FRA	Frédéric Nimani (loan return from (France) Sedan)
32	DF	ITA	Elia Legati (loan from (Italy) A.C. Milan)
35	MF	NGR	Sani Kaita (from (Netherlands) Sparta Rotterdam)

Out: Note: Flags indicate national team as defined under FIFA eligibility rules; some limited exceptions apply. Players may hold more than one non-FIFA nationality.

No.	Pos.	Nation	Player
1	GK	MON	Manuel Vallaurio (loan to (France) Evian)
2	DF	FRA	Sylvain Monsoreau (to (France) Saint-Étienne)
3	DF	FRA	Jérémy Berthod (to (France) AJ Auxerre)
7	MF	ARG	Lucas Bernardi (to (Argentina) Newell's Old Boys)
8	MF	ARG	Sergio Almirón (loan return to (Italy) Juventus)
10	FW	FRA	Jérémy Ménez (to (Italy) Roma)
11	FW	BRA	Nenê (loan to (Spain) Espanyol)
14	MF	FRA	Malaury Martin (loan to (France) Nîmes)
15	DF	BRA	Fábio Santos (loan return to (Brazil) São Paulo)
18	FW	FRA	Frédéric Piquionne (to (France) Lyon)
20	MF	URU	Nacho González (loan return to (Uruguay) Danubio)
22	DF	BRA	Bolívar (loan to (Brazil) Internacional)
26	DF	SEN	Massamba Sambou (loan to (France) Le Havre)
27	DF	FRA	Arnaud Lescure (loan to (France) Rodez)
33	FW	FRA	Steve Pinau (to (Italy) Genoa)

=== Winter ===
In: Note: Flags indicate national team as defined under FIFA eligibility rules; some limited exceptions apply. Players may hold more than one non-FIFA nationality.

No.	Pos.	Nation	Player
32	DF	CIV	Igor Lolo (from (Ukraine) Dnipro Dnipropetrovsk)
—	GK	MON	Manuel Vallaurio (loan return from (France) Evian)

Out: Note: Flags indicate national team as defined under FIFA eligibility rules; some limited exceptions apply. Players may hold more than one non-FIFA nationality.

No.	Pos.	Nation	Player
25	DF	ARG	Leandro Cufré (loan to (Germany) Hertha Berlin)
32	DF	ITA	Elia Legati (loan return to (Italy) A.C. Milan)
34	DF	GER	Torben Joneleit (loan to (Belgium) R.Charleroi)
35	MF	NGR	Sani Kaita (loan to (Russia) Kuban Krasnodar)

== Competitions ==
=== Ligue 1 ===
==== League table ====
Pos	Team	Pld	W	D	L	GF	GA	GD	Pts
9	Nice	38	13	11	14	40	41	−1	50
10	Lorient	38	10	15	13	47	47	0	45
11	Monaco	38	11	12	15	41	45	−4	45
12	Valenciennes	38	10	14	14	35	42	−7	44
13	Grenoble	38	10	14	14	24	37	−13	44

Source: Ligue 1
Rules for classification: 1) points; 2) goal difference; 3) number of goals scored.
France's third UEFA Europa League spot went to Ligue 2 side Guingamp, winners of 2008–09 Coupe de France.

==== Results summary ====
Overall								Home						Away					
Pld	W	D	L	GF	GA	GD	Pts	W	D	L	GF	GA	GD	W	D	L	GF	GA	GD
38	11	12	15	41	45	−4	45	7	4	8	26	23	+3	4	8	7	15	22	−7

Last updated: 31 March 2015.
Source: Soccerway

==== Results by round ====
Round	1	2	3	4	5	6	7	8	9	10	11	12	13	14	15	16	17	18	19	20	21	22	23	24	25	26	27	28	29	30	31	32	33	34	35	36	37	38
Ground	H	A	H	A	H	A	H	A	H	A	H	A	H	A	H	A	H	A	H	H	A	H	A	H	A	H	A	H	A	H	A	H	A	H	A	H	A	A
Result	W	D	D	L	W	D	L	L	L	D	W	W	L	L	W	W	D	L	L	L	D	W	D	L	L	D	D	W	W	L	D	W	W	L	L	D	L	D
Position	5	4	8	11	7	9	13	14	15	13	13	13	12	14	12	10	10	12	14	14	14	11	10	11	12	12	13	11	10	12	10	9	9	10	11	11	12	11

Source: Ligue 1
A = Away; H = Home; W = Win; D = Draw; L = Loss

==== Results ====
9 August 2008 1	AS Monaco	1 – 0	Paris Saint-Germain	Fontvieille
21:00 CEST UTC+2	Nimani 79'; Gosso (yellow card) 81'	Report	Makélélé (yellow card) 66'; Chantôme (yellow card) 88'	Stadium: Stade Louis II; Attendance: 16,904; Referee: Stéphane Bré

16 August 2008 2	Nantes	1 – 1	AS Monaco	Nantes
19:00 CEST UTC+2	Douglão (yellow card) 12'; Keșerü 67'; Babović (yellow card) 73'; Maréval (yellow card) 77'	Report	Meriem 4'; Ruffier (yellow card) 16'; Gosso (yellow card) 45'; Nenê (yellow card) 78'; Leko (yellow card) 90'	Stadium: Stade de la Beaujoire; Attendance: 29,039; Referee: Bertrand Layec

23 August 2008 3	AS Monaco	1 – 1	SM Caen	Fontvieille
19:00 CEST UTC+2	Nimani 52'; Pino (yellow card) 73'	Report	Eluchans (yellow card) 54'; Leko 74' (o.g.); Sorbon (yellow card) 81'; Savidan (yellow card) 90'	Stadium: Stade Louis II; Attendance: 9,183; Referee: Lionel Jaffredo

30 August 2008 4	Grenoble Foot	1 – 0	AS Monaco	Grenoble
19:00 CEST UTC+2	Moreira 18'; Romao (yellow card) 63'; Flachez (yellow card) 86'	Report	Leko (yellow card) 33'	Stadium: Stade des Alpes; Attendance: 18,885; Referee: Antony Gautier

13 September 2008 5	AS Monaco	2 – 0	Lorient	Fontvieille
19:00 CEST UTC+2	Park 25'; Nimani 70'	Report	Saïfi (yellow card) 74'	Stadium: Stade Louis II; Attendance: 6,928; Referee: Alain Hamer

21 September 2008 6	Marseille	0 – 0	AS Monaco	Marseille
21:00 CEST UTC+2		Report	Leko (yellow card) 27'; Alonso (yellow card) 49'	Stadium: Stade Vélodrome; Attendance: 51,342; Referee: Stéphane Lannoy

28 September 2008 7	AS Monaco	0 – 2	Lille	Fontvieille
17:00 CEST UTC+2	Pérez (yellow card) 38'	Report	Balmont (yellow card) 37'; Cabaye (yellow card) 61' (goal) 69'; Obraniak 87'	Stadium: Stade Louis II; Attendance: 6,936; Referee: Bertrand Layec

5 October 2008 8	Saint-Étienne	2 – 0	AS Monaco	Saint-Étienne
17:00 CEST UTC+2	Gomis 11'; Dernis 83'	Report	Pérez (yellow card) 63'	Stadium: Stade Geoffroy-Guichard; Attendance: 26,577; Referee: Clément Turpin

18 October 2008 9	AS Monaco	1 – 2	Nice	Fontvieille
19:00 CEST UTC+2	Cufré 39' (pen.) (yellow card) 90+3'; Šimić (yellow card) 34'; Leko (red card) 89'	Report	Bamogo 9'; Diakité (yellow card) 33'; Rool (yellow card) 35'; Apam (yellow card) 45'; Faé 57'	Stadium: Stade Louis II; Attendance: 13,543; Referee: Stéphane Bré

25 October 2008 10	Toulouse	0 – 0	AS Monaco	Toulouse
21:00 CEST UTC+2	Sirieix (yellow card) 6'; Capoue (yellow card) 16'; Didot (yellow card) 35'	Report	Pérez (yellow card) 31'; Alonso (yellow card) 48'; Mollo (yellow card) 90+1'	Stadium: Stadium Municipal; Attendance: 17,707; Referee: Damien Ledentu

29 October 2008 11	AS Monaco	3 – 1	Nancy	Fontvieille
19:00 CET UTC+1	Adriano (yellow card) 25'; Nimani 32'; Pokrivač 64'; Licata 87'	Report	Macaluso (yellow card) 62'; Calvé (yellow card) 69'; Hadji 76'	Stadium: Stade Louis II; Attendance: 6,640; Referee: Alexandre Castro

2 November 2008 12	Le Havre	2 – 3	AS Monaco	Le Havre
17:00 CET UTC+1	Nestor 47'; Alassane 60'; Idir (yellow card) 85'	Report	Cufré 20'; Pokrivač (yellow card) 32'; Licata 40'; Park 50'	Stadium: Stade Océane; Attendance: 13,593; Referee: Antony Gautier

8 November 2008 13	AS Monaco	0 – 1	Lyon	Fontvieille
19:00 CET UTC+1	Adriano (yellow card) 62'	Report	Fred 55'; Grosso (yellow card) 86'	Stadium: Stade Louis II; Attendance: 10,444; Referee: Hervé Piccirillo

16 November 2008 14	Rennes	2 – 1	AS Monaco	Rennes
17:00 CET UTC+1	Sow 43'; Briand 53'	Report	Park (yellow card) 55'; Cufré 72' (pen.) (yellow card) 77'	Stadium: Roazhon Park; Attendance: 21,086; Referee: Olivier Thual

23 November 2008 15	AS Monaco	3 – 0	Le Mans	Fontvieille
17:00 CET UTC+1	Alonso 49'; André 50' (o.g.); Licata 53'	Report	Coutadeur (yellow card) 15'	Stadium: Stade Louis II; Attendance: 6,294; Referee: Fredy Fautrel

29 November 2008 16	AJ Auxerre	0 – 1	AS Monaco	Auxerre
19:00 CET UTC+1	Grichting (yellow card) 59'; Mignot (yellow card) 79'	Report	Pokrivač 24' (yellow card) 25'; Alonso (yellow card) 33'	Stadium: Stade de l'Abbé-Deschamps; Attendance: 12,972; Referee: Stéphane Bré

7 December 2008 17	AS Monaco	1 – 1	Sochaux	Fontvieille
17:00 CET UTC+1	Alonso 20' (yellow card) 57'; Adriano (yellow card) 53'; Park (yellow card) 69'; Pokrivač (yellow card) 84'	Report	Santos 9'; Richert (yellow card) 30'; Thomas (yellow card) 35'; Daf (yellow card) 88'	Stadium: Stade Louis II; Attendance: 6,585; Referee: Philippe Kalt

13 December 2008 18	Valenciennes	3 – 1	AS Monaco	Valenciennes
19:00 CET UTC+1	Tiéné (yellow card) 18'; Sánchez 29'; Belmadi 41'; Pujol 59'; Rafael (yellow card) 86'	Report	Pino 23'; Gosso (yellow card) 36'; Cufré (yellow card) 70'; Leko (yellow card) 84' (yellow-red card) 86'; Adriano (yellow card) 90+1'	Stadium: Stade du Hainaut; Attendance: 11,322; Referee: Ruddy Buquet

21 December 2008 19	AS Monaco	3 – 4	Bordeaux	Fontvieille
21:00 CET UTC+1	Pino 13'; Licata 43', 50'; Mollo (yellow card) 45'; Adu (yellow card) 76'; Nimani (yellow card) 90+1'	Report	Chalmé (yellow card) 25'; Chamakh 67', 87' (yellow card) 88'; Diarra 67'; Cavenaghi 89' (yellow card) 89'	Stadium: Stade Louis II; Attendance: 8,142; Referee: Laurent Duhamel

10 January 2009 20	AS Monaco	1 – 2	Nantes	Fontvieille
21:00 CET UTC+1	Alonso (yellow card) 43'; Licata 86'	Report	Bagayoko 5' (yellow card) 76' (yellow-red card) 76'; Tall (yellow card) 33'; Capoue 41'; N'Daw (yellow card) 88'	Stadium: Stade Louis II; Attendance: 6,415; Referee: Éric Poulat

18 January 2009 21	SM Caen	2 – 2	AS Monaco	Caen
17:00 CET UTC+1	Gomis (yellow card) 65'; Savidan 73'; Nivet 90+2'	Report	Pino 6'; Gosso (yellow card) 15'; Alonso 24'; Pokrivač (yellow card) 39'	Stadium: Stade Michel d'Ornano; Attendance: 18,304; Referee: Damien Ledentu

31 January 2009 22	AS Monaco	1 – 0	Grenoble Foot	Fontvieille
19:00 CET UTC+1	Licata 68'	Report	Baning (yellow card) 69'	Stadium: Stade Louis II; Attendance: 6,710; Referee: Bertrand Layec

7 February 2009 23	Lorient	1 – 1	AS Monaco	Lorient
19:00 CET UTC+1	Ciani (yellow card) 12'; Abriel 60'; Marchal (yellow card) 89'	Report	Gosso (yellow card) 14'; Mollo 21'; Šimić (yellow card) 81'; Pokrivač (yellow card) 87'	Stadium: Stade du Moustoir; Attendance: 9,775; Referee: Jean-Charles Cailleux

15 February 2009 24	AS Monaco	0 – 1	Marseille	Fontvieille
21:00 CET UTC+1	Pokrivač (yellow card) 56'	Report	Koné 77'	Stadium: Stade Louis II; Attendance: 13,475; Referee: Antony Gautier

22 February 2009 25	Lille	2 – 1	AS Monaco	Villeneuve-d'Ascq
21:00 CET UTC+1	Obraniak 12'; Béria (yellow card) 64'; Dumont 90+2'	Report	Modesto (yellow card) 31'; Meriem (yellow card) 44'; Alonso (yellow card) 65' (yellow-red card) 67'; Leko (yellow card) 86'; Malicki 90+4' (o.g.)	Stadium: Stadium Lille Métropole; Attendance: 13,485; Referee: Ruddy Buquet

1 March 2009 26	AS Monaco	2 – 2	Saint-Étienne	Fontvieille
17:00 CET UTC+1	Nimani 20'; Gosso (yellow card) 56'; Mollo 90+2'	Report	Payet 26'; Matsui 61' (yellow card) 71'; Sall (yellow card) 68'; Gomis (yellow card) 89'	Stadium: Stade Louis II; Attendance: 8,374; Referee: Saïd Ennjimi

7 March 2009 27	Nice	0 – 0	AS Monaco	Nice
19:00 CET UTC+1	Faé (yellow card) 86'	Report	Gosso (yellow card) 16'; Lolo (yellow card) 36'; Leko (yellow card) 66'; Mongongu (yellow card) 75' (yellow-red card) 77'	Stadium: Allianz Riviera; Attendance: 10,357; Referee: Tony Chapron

14 March 2009 28	AS Monaco	3 – 2	Toulouse	Fontvieille
19:00 CET UTC+1	Nimani 40'; Modesto 75'; Gosso (yellow card) 81'; Lolo 89'	Report	M'Bengue (yellow card) 7'; Gignac 26'; Cetto 68'; Capoue (yellow card) 75'; Congré (yellow card) 89'	Stadium: Stade Louis II; Attendance: 6,752; Referee: Philippe Kalt

21 March 2009 29	Nancy	0 – 1	AS Monaco	Tomblaine
19:00 CET UTC+1	Luiz (yellow card) 59'; Hélder (yellow card) 82'	Report	Pokrivač (yellow card) 69'; Park 70'; Mollo (yellow card) 88'	Stadium: Stade Marcel Picot; Attendance: 19,377; Referee: Lionel Jaffredo

4 April 2009 30	AS Monaco	0 – 1	Le Havre	Fontvieille
19:00 CEST UTC+2	Šimić (yellow card) 29' (yellow-red card) 90'	Report	Sambou 76'; Alla (yellow card) 78'	Stadium: Stade Louis II; Attendance: 6,459; Referee: Jean-Charles Cailleux

12 April 2009 31	Lyon	2 – 2	AS Monaco	Lyon
21:00 CEST UTC+2	Cris (yellow card) 39' (goal) 65'; Källström (yellow card) 41'; Réveillère (yellow card) 53'; Makoun (yellow card) 70'; Piquionne 81'	Report	Lolo (yellow card) 31'; Leko 34' (yellow card) 74'; Pérez (yellow card) 43'; Ruffier (yellow card) 45+1'; Pino 66'; Gosso (yellow card) 70'	Stadium: Stade de Gerland; Attendance: 40,245; Referee: Antony Gautier

18 April 2009 32	AS Monaco	3 – 1	Rennes	Fontvieille
19:00 CEST UTC+2	Leko (yellow card) 19' (goal) 78' (pen.); Gosso (yellow card) 45+1'; Pino 84', 90+3'	Report	Hansson (yellow card) 65'; Leroy (yellow card) 69'; Aubey (red card) 76'; Cheyrou 85'	Stadium: Stade Louis II; Attendance: 7,714; Referee: Éric Poulat

26 April 2009 33	Le Mans	0 – 1	AS Monaco	Le Mans
17:00 CEST UTC+2	Géder (yellow card) 60'; Maïga (yellow card) 62'	Report	Park 87'	Stadium: Stade Léon-Bollée; Attendance: 10,531; Referee: Olivier Thual

2 May 2009 34	AS Monaco	0 – 1	AJ Auxerre	Fontvieille
19:00 CEST UTC+2		Report	Kahlenberg 26'	Stadium: Stade Louis II; Attendance: 7,203; Referee: Jean-Charles Cailleux

13 May 2009 35	Sochaux	3 – 0	AS Monaco	Montbéliard
19:00 CEST UTC+2	Martin 26'; Modesto 46' (o.g.); Perquis (yellow card) 52'; Svěrkoš 71'	Report	Mongongu (yellow card) 44'; Leko (yellow card) 60'; Lolo (yellow card) 67'	Stadium: Stade Auguste Bonal; Attendance: 16,879; Referee: Bertrand Layec

16 May 2009 36	AS Monaco	1 – 1	Valenciennes	Fontvieille
19:00 CEST UTC+2	Park 7'	Report	Audel 61' (yellow card) 76'	Stadium: Stade Louis II; Attendance: 7,026; Referee: Laurent Duhamel

23 May 2009 37	Bordeaux	1 – 0	AS Monaco	Bordeaux
21:00 CEST UTC+2	Chamakh 35'; Jussiê (yellow card) 42'; Cavenaghi (yellow card) 90+2'	Report	Haruna (yellow card) 78' (yellow-red card) 90'; Diaz (yellow card) 82'; Pérez (yellow card) 88'	Stadium: Stade Chaban-Delmas; Attendance: 32,260; Referee: Thierry Auriac

30 May 2009 38	Paris Saint-Germain	0 – 0	AS Monaco	Paris
21:00 CEST UTC+2	Clément (yellow card) 63'; Pancrate (yellow card) 66'	Report	Modesto (yellow card) 41'; Mongongu (yellow card) 55'; Park (yellow card) 80'	Stadium: Parc des Princes; Attendance: 43,665; Referee: Olivier Thual

=== Coupe de la Ligue ===
24 September 2009 Third Round	AS Monaco	0 – 1	Paris Saint-Germain	Fontvieille
17:00 CEST UTC+2		Report	Pancrate 34'; Mulumbu (yellow card) 62'	Stadium: Stade Louis II; Attendance: 5,581; Referee: Philippe Kalt

=== Coupe de France ===
4 January 2009 Round of 64	Blagnac	0 – 1	AS Monaco	Blagnac
14:45 CET UTC+1	Y.Calvet (yellow card) 21'; G.Pradere (yellow card) 82'	Report	Marquet 21' (o.g.); Muratori (yellow card) 28'; Licata (yellow card) 86'; Ruffier (yellow card) 90+2'	Stadium: Stade Municipal des Ramiers

25 January 2009 Round of 32	AS Monaco	1 – 0	Nice	Fontvieille
20:45 CET UTC+1	Diaz (yellow card) 58'; Licata 83'; Pokrivač (yellow card) 86'; Pérez (yellow card) 89'	Report	Hognon (yellow card) 27'	Stadium: Stade Louis II

4 March 2009 Round of 16	Ajaccio	0 – 2	AS Monaco	Ajaccio
19:00 CET UTC+1	Martins (yellow card) 50'	Report	Pokrivač 30'; Licata 74'	Stadium: Stade François Coty

18 March 2009 Quarterfinal	Grenoble Foot	2 – 0	AS Monaco	Grenoble
17:00 CET UTC+1	Moreira 13'; Akrour 54'	Report		Stadium: Stade des Alpes; Attendance: 14,065; Referee: Thierry Auriac

== Statistics ==
As of match played 30 May 2009

=== Appearances and goals ===
No.	Pos	Nat	Player	Total		Ligue 1		Coupe de France		Coupe de la Ligue	
No.	Pos	Nat	Player	Apps	Goals	Apps	Goals	Apps	Goals	Apps	Goals
1	GK	(France) FRA	Yohann Thuram-Ulien	3	0	2+1	0	0	0	0	0
2	DF	(Democratic Republic of the Congo) COD	Cédric Mongongu	26	0	19+3	0	3	0	1	0
3	DF	(Cameroon) CMR	Nicolas Nkoulou	25	0	21+2	0	1	0	1	0
4	DF	(France) FRA	François Modesto	34	1	29+2	1	3	0	0	0
5	MF	(Uruguay) URU	Diego Pérez	26	0	14+8	0	3	0	1	0
6	MF	(Croatia) CRO	Nikola Pokrivač	27	3	17+6	2	3	1	1	0
8	DF	(Switzerland) SUI	Patrick Müller	10	0	6+1	0	3	0	0	0
9	FW	(France) FRA	Yannick Sagbo	4	0	0+3	0	0+1	0	0	0
10	FW	(South Korea) KOR	Park Chu-young	35	5	31	5	3	0	0+1	0
11	FW	(United States) USA	Freddy Adu	10	0	0+9	0	0	0	1	0
12	DF	(Brazil) BRA	Adriano	15	0	15	0	0	0	0	0
13	DF	(France) FRA	Vincent Muratori	11	0	7+1	0	2	0	1	0
14	DF	(Croatia) CRO	Dario Šimić	30	0	26+1	0	2	0	1	0
15	DF	(France) FRA	Thomas Mangani	3	0	3	0	0	0	0	0
16	GK	(France) FRA	Stéphane Ruffier	36	0	32	0	4	0	0	0
17	FW	(France) FRA	Serge Gakpé	14	0	5+8	0	0+1	0	0	0
18	MF	(Argentina) ARG	Alejandro Alonso	19	3	17	3	1	0	0+1	0
19	MF	(Ivory Coast) CIV	Jean-Jacques Gosso	32	0	29+2	0	1	0	0	0
20	FW	(Colombia) COL	Juan Pablo Pino	26	6	20+3	6	2	0	1	0
21	MF	(France) FRA	Camel Meriem	31	1	23+5	1	2	0	1	0
22	FW	(France) FRA	Alexandre Licata	24	9	12+9	7	2+1	2	0	0
23	MF	(Croatia) CRO	Jerko Leko	26	2	20+4	2	1	0	1	0
25	MF	(Nigeria) NGR	Lukman Haruna	4	0	1+3	0	0	0	0	0
26	MF	(France) FRA	Yohan Mollo	28	2	18+6	2	3+1	0	0	0
27	FW	(France) FRA	Frédéric Nimani	32	6	15+13	6	2+1	0	0+1	0
28	FW	(France) FRA	Djamel Bakar	7	0	1+5	0	0+1	0	0	0
30	GK	(Italy) ITA	Flavio Roma	5	0	4	0	0	0	1	0
31	MF	(France) FRA	Kévin Diaz	5	0	2+2	0	1	0	0	0
32	DF	(Ivory Coast) CIV	Igor Lolo	12	1	10	1	2	0	0	0
Players away from the club on loan:
11	FW	(Brazil) BRA	Nenê	1	0	1	0	0	0	0	0
25	DF	(Argentina) ARG	Leandro Cufré	15	3	15	3	0	0	0	0
35	MF	(Nigeria) NGR	Sani Kaita	3	0	2+1	0	0	0	0	0
Players who appeared for Monaco no longer at the club:
10	FW	(France) FRA	Jérémy Ménez	3	0	1+2	0	0	0	0	0

=== Goal scorers ===
Place	Position	Nation	Number	Name	Ligue 1	Coupe de France	Coupe de la Ligue	Total
1	FW	(France)	22	Alexandre Licata	7	2	0	9
2	FW	(France)	27	Frédéric Nimani	6	0	0	6
2	FW	(Colombia)	20	Juan Pablo Pino	6	0	0	6
4	FW	(South Korea)	10	Park Chu-young	5	0	0	5
5	DF	(Argentina)	25	Leandro Cufré	3	0	0	3
5	MF	(Argentina)	18	Alejandro Alonso	3	0	0	3
5	MF	(Croatia)	6	Nikola Pokrivač	2	1	0	3
5				Own goal	2	1	0	3
9	MF	(France)	26	Yohan Mollo	2	0	0	2
9	MF	(Croatia)	23	Jerko Leko	2	0	0	2
11	MF	(France)	21	Camel Meriem	1	0	0	1
11	DF	(France)	4	François Modesto	1	0	0	1
11	DF	(Ivory Coast)	32	Igor Lolo	1	0	0	1
				TOTALS	41	4	0	45

=== Disciplinary record ===
Number	Nation	Position	Name	Ligue 1		Coupe de France		Coupe de la Ligue		Total	
Number	Nation	Position	Name	Yellow card	Red card	Yellow card	Red card	Yellow card	Red card	Yellow card	Red card
2	(Democratic Republic of the Congo)	DF	Cédric Mongongu	4	1	0	0	0	0	4	1
4	(France)	DF	François Modesto	2	0	0	0	0	0	2	0
5	(Uruguay)	MF	Diego Pérez	5	0	1	0	0	0	6	0
6	(Croatia)	MF	Nikola Pokrivač	7	0	1	0	0	0	8	0
10	(South Korea)	FW	Park Chu-young	3	0	0	0	0	0	3	0
11	(Brazil)	FW	Nenê	1	0	0	0	0	0	1	0
11	(United States)	FW	Freddy Adu	1	0	0	0	0	0	1	0
12	(Brazil)	DF	Adriano	4	0	0	0	0	0	4	0
13	(France)	DF	Vincent Muratori	0	0	1	0	0	0	1	0
14	(Croatia)	DF	Dario Šimić	4	1	0	0	0	0	4	1
16	(France)	GK	Stéphane Ruffier	2	0	1	0	0	0	3	0
18	(Argentina)	MF	Alejandro Alonso	7	1	0	0	0	0	7	1
19	(Ivory Coast)	MF	Jean-Jacques Gosso	10	0	0	0	0	0	10	0
20	(Colombia)	FW	Juan Pablo Pino	1	0	0	0	0	0	1	0
21	(France)	MF	Camel Meriem	1	0	0	0	0	0	1	0
22	(France)	FW	Alexandre Licata	0	0	1	0	0	0	1	0
23	(Croatia)	MF	Jerko Leko	10	2	0	0	0	0	10	2
25	(Argentina)	DF	Leandro Cufré	3	0	0	0	0	0	3	0
25	(Nigeria)	MF	Lukman Haruna	2	1	0	0	0	0	2	1
26	(France)	MF	Yohan Mollo	3	0	0	0	0	0	3	0
27	(France)	FW	Frédéric Nimani	1	0	0	0	0	0	1	0
31	(France)	MF	Kévin Diaz	1	0	1	0	0	0	2	0
32	(Ivory Coast)	DF	Igor Lolo	3	0	0	0	0	0	3	0
			TOTALS	75	6	6	0	0	0	81	6
