= Jonathan Pérez =

Jonathan Pérez may refer to:

- Jonathan Pérez (footballer, born 1987), French footballer
- Jonathan Pérez (footballer, born 2003), Mexican footballer
- Jonathan Pérez (musician) (born 1979), Chilean drummer
