= Frédéric Nimani =

Footballer (born 1988)

Personal information
- Full name: Frédéric Koutou Nimani N'Galou
- Date of birth: 8 October 1988 (age 38)
- Place of birth: Marseille, France
- Height: 1.91 m (6 ft 3 in)
- Positions: Centre forward; winger

Youth career
- 1995–1998: Burel
- 1998–1999: Marseille
- 1999–2001: SO Caillolais
- 2001–2002: Vivaux Marroniers
- 2002–2006: Monaco

Senior career*
Years	Team	Apps	(Gls)
2006–2013	Monaco	43	(9)
2007–2008	→ Lorient (loan)	2	(0)
2008	→ Sedan (loan)	6	(0)
2010	→ Burnley (loan)	2	(0)
2010–2011	→ Nantes (loan)	0	(0)
2012	→ PAOK (loan)	13	(1)
2013	Istres	10	(0)
2013–2014	OFI	3	(0)
2015–2016	Fribourg	18	(6)
2016	Egersunds	24	(12)
2016–2017	Fribourg	4	(0)
2017–2019	Neuchâtel Xamax	19	(2)
2021	Sant Julià	6	(0)
2021–2022	Racing Besançon	8	(1)
2022	Young Fellows Juventus	10	(0)

International career^{‡}
2008–2009	France U21	8	(2)
2018–	Central African Republic	4	(0)
- * Club domestic league appearances and goals as of 11 June 2022 ‡ National team caps and goals as of 08:43, 16 July 2019 (UTC)

Frédéric Koutou Nimani N'Galou (born 8 October 1988) is a professional footballer who plays as centre forward or winger. Born in France, he played for the France U21 and the Central African Republic senior national team at international level.

== Club career ==
=== Monaco and loan moves ===
Born in Marseille, Nimani's spell at AS Monaco began well when he scored on his debut against Auxerre on 9 September 2006. Despite bursting onto the scene at the Stade Louis II in spectacular fashion, he was loaned to Lorient in 2007. However, after a bust-up with Christian Gourcuff in January 2008, he was recalled and loaned to Ligue 2 outfit Sedan for the rest of the season.

On his return to Monaco, he scored the match winner on the first day of the 2008–2009 season against Paris Saint Germain. Nimani went on to register 7 goals in his first full season at Monaco, developing a good partnership with fellow striker Park Chu-Young and keeping the likes of Serge Gakpé and Juan Pablo Pino out of the first team.

Nimani's success attracted the attention of English Premier League and Spanish La Liga teams, most notably Arsenal and Real Madrid. In June 2009, it was reported in the press that Alex McLeish and Tony Mowbray were tracking the French U21 international.

==== Burnley loan ====
On 19 January 2010, it was reported that Nimani was set to move to Premier League Club Burnley on loan deal with a further view to buy the player for €4 million. After training with the club he signed on a five-month loan deal on 22 January 2010.

However, Nimani made two appearances for Burnley coming on for Chris Eagles on a 65 minutes in a 1–0 defeat against Bolton Wanderers and he came on as a replacement for David Nugent in Burnley's 5-2 defeat away at Aston Villa, subsequently becoming the first player from the Central African Republic to play in the Premier League. Following Burnley's relegation back to the Championship, after one season in the Premier League, Burnley did not take up a permanent move for Nimani.

==== Nantes loan ====
Following his spell in England, Nimani joined French side Nantes on loan again for the rest of the season and never made appearance for Nantes. After AS Monaco's relegation to Ligue 2, Nimani scored his first goal in two years against Troyes in a 1–1 draw on 6 August 2011. Nimani made only made three appearances this season at AS Monaco after falling out with managers Laurent Banide and then Marco Simone.

==== PAOK loan ====
On 30 January 2012, Nimani agreed to sign with Greek club PAOK until the end of the season. He signed with PAOK on loan from Monaco with a clause allowing PAOK to make the move permanent at the end of the 2011–2012 season. He was a personal choice of club's coach László Bölöni. Nimani debut for the club in a 2–0 win over OFI on 12 February 2012. Nimani made his Europa League debut in the second leg against Udinese in a 3–0 loss on 23 February 2012, putting PAOK out of the tournament. On 18 April 2012, Nimani scored his first goal in a 2–0 win over Doxa Drama. After a loan at PAOK, the club did not take up a permanent move for Nimani.

=== Istres ===
After his loan at PAOK ended, Nimani return to Monaco and he was barely used in the first team. In January, it announced that Nimani was expected to leave the club before Nimani was released by the club. Just a few days later after his release, Nimani joined Istres on a free transfer, until the end of the 2012–13 season. He made ten appearances for the club.

=== OFI ===
At the end of the 2012–13 season, Nimani left the club and move abroad to Greece by joining OFI on a two-year deal.

=== Fribourg and Egersund ===
In 2015, Nimani played for FC Fribourg.

Nimani had a short spell at the Norwegian side Egersunds IK. He made a partnership with Stian Koldal and Frode Egebakken. He made 24 appearances and produced 12 goals.

In September 2016, he returned to FC Fribourg.

=== Xamax ===
On 31 January 2017, the last day of the 2016–17 winter transfer window, Nimani joined Swiss Challenge League side Neuchâtel Xamax FCS. He signed a contract until June 2018 with the option of an extension in case of promotion to the Swiss Super League.

=== Sant Julia ===
In February 2021, Nimani signed for Andorran side Sant Julià.

=== Racing Besancon ===
In July 2021, Nimani joined Racing Besançon in France.

=== SC Young Fellows Juventus ===
In January 2022, Nimani returned to Switzerland to sign for Young Fellows Juventus who play in the Swiss 1. Liga Promotion.

== International career ==
Nimani played eight times and scored two times with the France U21, but was eligible to play for both Chad and Central African Republic. He was called up for the first time to the latter selection and made his debut in the 2019 Africa Cup of Nations qualification match against Guinea on 9 September 2018.

== Personal life ==
Nimani was born in Marseille and is of Chadian and Central African descent.

== Career statistics ==
Appearances and goals by national team and year
National team	Year	Apps	Goals
Central African Republic	2018	4	0
Total		4	0
