= Adriano (footballer, born April 1982) =

Brazilian footballer

Personal information
- Full name: Adriano Pereira da Silva
- Date of birth: 3 April 1982 (age 44)
- Place of birth: Salvador, Bahia, Brazil
- Height: 1.79 m (5 ft 10 in)
- Position: Defender

Senior career*
Years	Team	Apps	(Gls)
2001–2004	Grêmio	46	(2)
2004–2005	Palermo	1	(0)
2005	→ Atalanta (loan)	10	(2)
2005–2007	Atalanta	61	(2)
2007–2013	Monaco	116	(5)
Total		234	(11)

International career
2003	Brazil U20	3	(0)
- * Club domestic league appearances and goals

Adriano Pereira da Silva (born 3 April 1982), known as Adriano, is a Brazilian former professional footballer who played as a defender.

== Career ==
Adriano was born in Salvador, Bahia. He was signed by Palermo from Grêmio in summer 2004, but just played one league match. 50% of Adriano's registration rights was sold to Atalanta in summer 2005 after a successful 6 months loan. Along with Igor Budan they cost Atalanta €1.5 million as part of Stephen Makinwa's deal. Adriano was valued €500,000 at that time.

Atalanta bought all the rights on 1 June 2007, but sold him to Monaco on last day of the transfer window. On 12 July 2013, Monaco announced that Adriano had left the club after six years.

== Career statistics ==
As of match played 30 March 2013

Appearances and goals by club, season and competition
Club	Season	League			National cup		League cup		Continental		Other		Total	
Club	Season	Division	Apps	Goals	Apps	Goals	Apps	Goals	Apps	Goals	Apps	Goals	Apps	Goals
Palermo	2004–05	Serie A	1	0	2	0	–		–		–		3	0
Atalanta (loan)	2004–05	Serie A	10	2	1	0	–		–		–		11	2
Atalanta	2005–06	Serie B	35	1			–		–		–		35	1
Atalanta	2006–07	Serie A	25	1	2	0	–		–		–		27	1
Atalanta	2007–08	Serie A	1	0	1	0	–		–		–		2	0
Atalanta	Total		61	2	3	0	0	0	0	0	0	0	64	2
Monaco	2007–08	Ligue 1	24	0	2	0	2	0	–		–		28	0
Monaco	2008–09	Ligue 1	15	0	0	0	0	0	–		–		15	0
Monaco	2009–10	Ligue 1	16	0	1	0	0	0	–		–		17	0
Monaco	2010–11	Ligue 1	32	4	0	0	2	0	–		–		34	4
Monaco	2011–12	Ligue 2	14	0	0	0	1	1	–		–		15	1
Monaco	2012–13	Ligue 2	15	1	2	0	3	0	–		–		20	1
Monaco	Total		116	5	5	0	8	1	0	0	0	0	129	6
Career total			188	9	11	0	8	1	0	0	0	0	207	10
