= Alexandre Licata =

French footballer (born 1984)

Personal information
- Date of birth: 2 January 1984 (age 42)
- Place of birth: Grenoble, France
- Height: 1.80 m (5 ft 11 in)
- Position: Striker

Senior career*
Years	Team	Apps	(Gls)
2003–2004	Lille II	25	(4)
2004–2006	Louhans-Cuiseaux	38	(20)
2006–2009	Monaco	20	(7)
2007	→ Gueugnon (loan)	5	(2)
2007–2008	→ Bastia (loan)	26	(4)
2009–2012	Auxerre	0	(0)
Total		120	(38)
- * Club domestic league appearances and goals

Alexandre Licata (born 2 January 1984) is a French former professional footballer who played as a striker.

== Career ==
Licata was born in Grenoble. He started his career at Lille OSC. Licata joined CS Louhans-Cuiseaux in 2004 when they were in the Championnat National, scoring 20 goals in his first two seasons. On 9 May 2009, the 25-year-old striker from AS Monaco signed a new four-year contract with AJ Auxerre, who offered him a much higher salary.

He was drafted in to help score goals, as fellow striker Daniel Niculae failed to score a single goal in the 2008–09 season. However, he has missed all of the season up until April 2010 because of a serious ankle injury. After never fully recover from the injury he decided to retire in 2012.

== Career statistics ==
Appearances and goals by club, season and competition
Club	Season	League			Ref.
Club	Season	Division	Apps	Goals	Ref.
Lille II	2003–04	CFA	25	4	
Louhans-Cuiseaux	2004–05	CFA	18	10	
Louhans-Cuiseaux	2005–06	National	20	10	
Louhans-Cuiseaux	Total		38	20	–
Monaco	2005–06	Ligue 1	0	0	
Monaco	2006–07	Ligue 1	0	0	
Monaco	2008–09	Ligue 1	20	7	
Monaco	Total		20	7	–
Gueugnon (loan)	2006–07	Ligue 2	5	2	
Bastia (loan)	2007–08	Ligue 2	26	4	
Auxerre B	2009–10	CFA	6	1	
Auxerre B	2010–11	CFA	0	0	
Auxerre B	2011–12	CFA	0	0	
Auxerre B	Total		6	1	–
Career total			120	38	–
