= Elia Legati =

Italian footballer (born 1986)

Personal information
- Date of birth: 3 January 1986 (age 40)
- Place of birth: Fidenza, Italy
- Height: 1.88 m (6 ft 2 in)
- Position: Centre back

Youth career
- Fiorenzuola
- 2001–2006: Milan

Senior career*
Years	Team	Apps	(Gls)
2006–2009	Milan	0	(0)
2006–2008	→ Legnano (loan)	57	(0)
2008–2009	→ Monaco (loan)	0	(0)
2009	→ Novara (loan)	13	(0)
2009–2010	Crotone	40	(1)
2010–2014	Padova	112	(3)
2014	→ Carpi (loan)	12	(0)
2014–2015	Venezia	30	(1)
2015–2018	Pro Vercelli	87	(3)
2018–2023	FeralpiSalò	126	(5)

International career
2005	Italy U-19	1	(0)
2005–2006	Italy U-20	3	(0)
- * Club domestic league appearances and goals

Elia Legati (born 3 January 1986) is an Italian former professional footballer who played as a defender.

== Club career ==
Legati was signed by Milan from Fiorenzuola in 2001. He played in their youth teams for six years, before joining Legnano on a two-season loan in August 2006.

For the 2008–09 season he moved to French side Monaco on another loan spell; however, he was called back in January, due to lack of playing time, and subsequently loaned to Novara for the remainder of the season.

In July 2009, he was transferred to Crotone in a co-ownership deal, for €10,000. He made 40 appearances and scored one goal in his first Serie B season; his good performances prompted Milan to re-acquire him fully, for €350,000. However, for the 2010–11 season, he was signed by Padova in a new co-ownership deal, for €660,000. In June 2011 Padova bought him outright for another €660,000.

On 16 January 2018, he signed a contract with FeralpiSalò until 30 June 2020. Legati announced his retirement from playing on 13 May 2023, with his shirt number 13 retired by the club.
