= Nenê (footballer, born 1981) =

Brazilian footballer

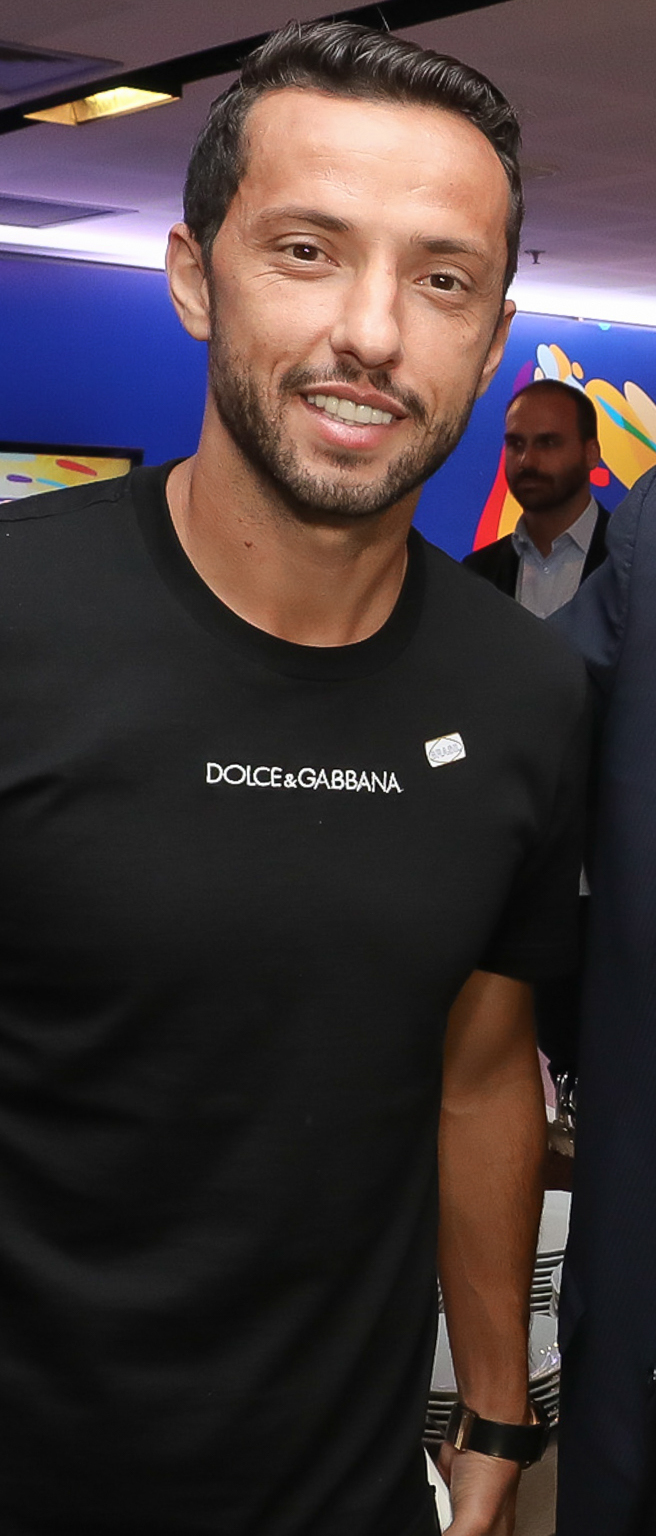
- Nenê in 2019

Personal information
- Full name: Anderson Luiz de Carvalho
- Date of birth: 19 July 1981 (age 45)
- Place of birth: Jundiaí, Brazil
- Height: 1.81 m (5 ft 11 in)
- Position: Attacking midfielder

Team information
- Current team: Botafogo-PB
- Number: 10

Youth career
- 1996–1997: Bahia
- 1997–1998: Sporting CP
- 1998–1999: Corinthians

Senior career*
Years	Team	Apps	(Gls)
1999–2003	Paulista	32	(26)
2002	→ Palmeiras (loan)	24	(5)
2003	→ Santos (loan)	28	(8)
2003–2004	Mallorca	29	(2)
2004–2006	Alavés	78	(21)
2006–2007	Celta	38	(8)
2007–2010	Monaco	63	(19)
2008–2009	→ Espanyol (loan)	35	(4)
2010–2013	Paris Saint-Germain	79	(36)
2013–2015	Al-Gharafa	43	(20)
2015	West Ham United	8	(0)
2015–2018	Vasco da Gama	116	(38)
2018–2019	São Paulo	60	(10)
2019–2021	Fluminense	91	(19)
2021–2023	Vasco da Gama	66	(17)
2023–2025	Juventude	92	(13)
2026–	Botafogo-PB	31	(10)

International career
2001	Brazil U20	1+	(0+)
2003	Brazil U23	6	(1)
- * Club domestic league appearances and goals as of 8 November 2026

Anderson Luiz de Carvalho (born 19 July 1981), known as Nenê, is a Brazilian professional footballer who plays as an attacking midfielder for Campeonato Brasileiro Série C club Botafogo-PB.

As of 2025, he is the oldest player to score in a Série A match, having set this record on 21 August 2025 at 44 years and 32 days old. He is also one of a few players in football with more than 1,100 official appearances.

Nenê started his career in 2000 for Paulista and was loaned to Palmeiras and Santos, before leaving Brazil and spending most of his professional career in Spain, representing four clubs and amassing 140 games and 23 goals over the course of four La Liga seasons, and France, where he made 142 Ligue 1 appearances in four and a half campaigns and scored 55 goals for Monaco and Paris Saint-Germain. He won the 2012–13 Ligue 1 title with PSG and also became the league's best foreign player in 2010 while playing for Monaco.

Nenê had brief tenures in Qatar (Al-Gharafa) and England (West Ham United) before returning to Brazil. Since then, he has played for Vasco da Gama (twice), São Paulo, Fluminense and Juventude, before joining Botafogo-PB.

== Club career ==
=== Early career ===
Born in Jundiaí, São Paulo, Nenê started playing professionally with local Etti Jundiaí at the age of 19. On 16 May 2002, he moved to Palmeiras on loan until December.

Nenê made his Brasileirão Série A debut on 11 August 2002, starting and scoring the opening goal in a 1–1 home draw against Grêmio. He finished the year with five league goals, but his club suffered relegation for the first time in its history.

On 27 January 2003, Nenê signed for defending Série A champions Santos. Mainly a backup option to Robinho and Ricardo Oliveira, he still scored three goals during the team's Copa Libertadores run, and also appeared in both legs of the finals as a substitute.

=== Spain ===
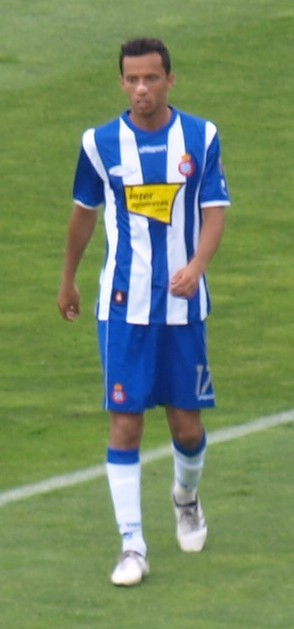
Nenê playing for Espanyol

In 2003–04, Nenê moved to Spain, first with RCD Mallorca – making his La Liga debut on 14 September 2003 in a 0–4 away loss against Athletic Bilbao– and then Deportivo Alavés. With the Basque side he put up two extraordinary individual seasons, with 21 goals in the league alone, playing his first year in the second division and achieving promotion.

After being relegated from the top level with Alavés in 2006, Nenê met the same fate with RC Celta de Vigo, again appearing in all 38 league games and totalling nearly 3,000 minutes of action for the Galicians.

=== Monaco ===
On 22 August 2007, Nenê was transferred to AS Monaco FC for an undisclosed fee. A year later, having already started with the French, he joined RCD Espanyol in the last days of the summer transfer window on a one-year loan, with a buying option for the Catalans at the season's end, which was finally not activated.

Back with Monaco, Nenê began the new campaign in impressive scoring fashion, scoring nine goals in his first ten matches – this included a brace against US Boulogne in a 3–1 away victory, both from long-range free kicks, as he led the scoring charts for a lengthy period of time.

=== Paris Saint-Germain ===
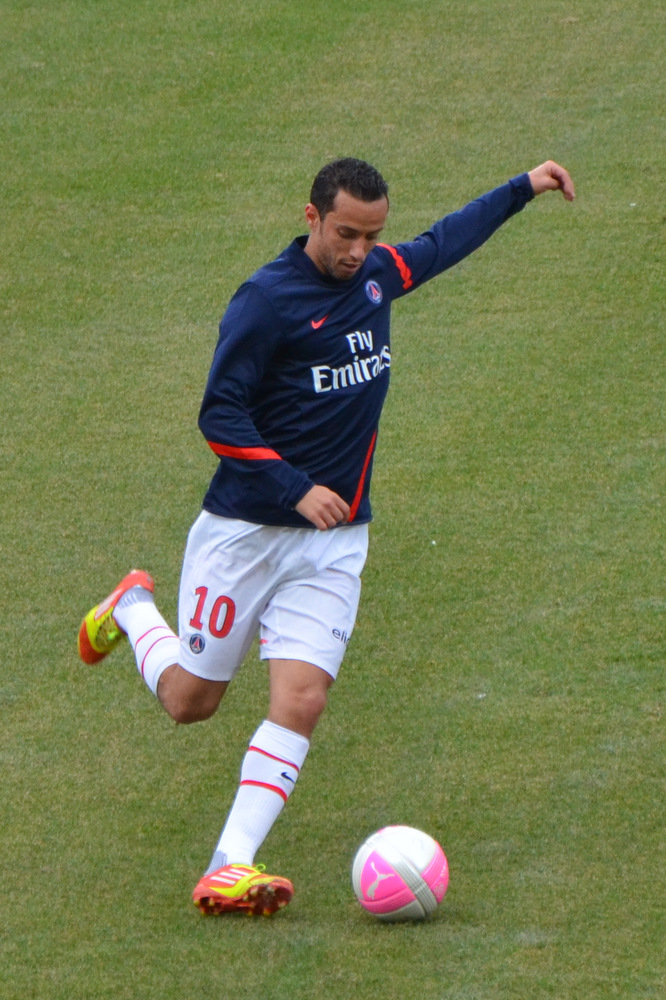
Nenê with Paris Saint-Germain in 2012

On 11 July 2010, Nenê joined Paris Saint-Germain in a deal believed to be around €5.5 million. "I'm very happy to have signed for Paris," the player told PSG's official website, adding: "Like PSG, I'm hoping to have a big league season and to pull something off in the Europa League". He scored in his first official appearance, a 3–1 home win against AS Saint-Étienne, adding two on 11 September against newly promoted AC Arles-Avignon (4–0, home). Halfway through the season he had already registered 13 goals, making him the third-highest scorer only behind Moussa Sow and Kevin Gameiro; his displays, free-kick ability and attacking flair earned him comparisons with Ronaldinho, a compatriot who played at the Parc des Princes earlier in the decade, but he only scored one more goal until the end of the campaign, with PSG finally finishing fourth.

In the summer of 2011, Paris Saint-Germain were purchased by Qatari investors and bought several new players, including Jérémy Menez with whom Nenê had played at Monaco. The Brazilian began the season hesitantly, struggling to accept that he had lost his star status in the team with the arrival of Javier Pastore. On 29 October, however, he scored two goals (both penalties) in a 4–2 home win against Stade Malherbe Caen, putting his team three points clear at the top of the table.

Nenê scored his first hat-trick with PSG on 13 May 2012, netting all of the game's goals in the home fixture against Rennes in only 18 minutes of play. He finished the campaign as the league's second top scorer, helping his side to second and direct qualification to the UEFA Champions League.

=== Al-Gharafa ===
On 15 January 2013, after having appeared in 112 official matches with PSG (but only nine in the league in the first half of the season), Nenê moved to Al-Gharafa SC in the Qatar Stars League. In March, he was suspended for nine games and fined €67,000 for fighting with Houssine Kharja, being eventually released in late January of the following year.

=== West Ham United ===
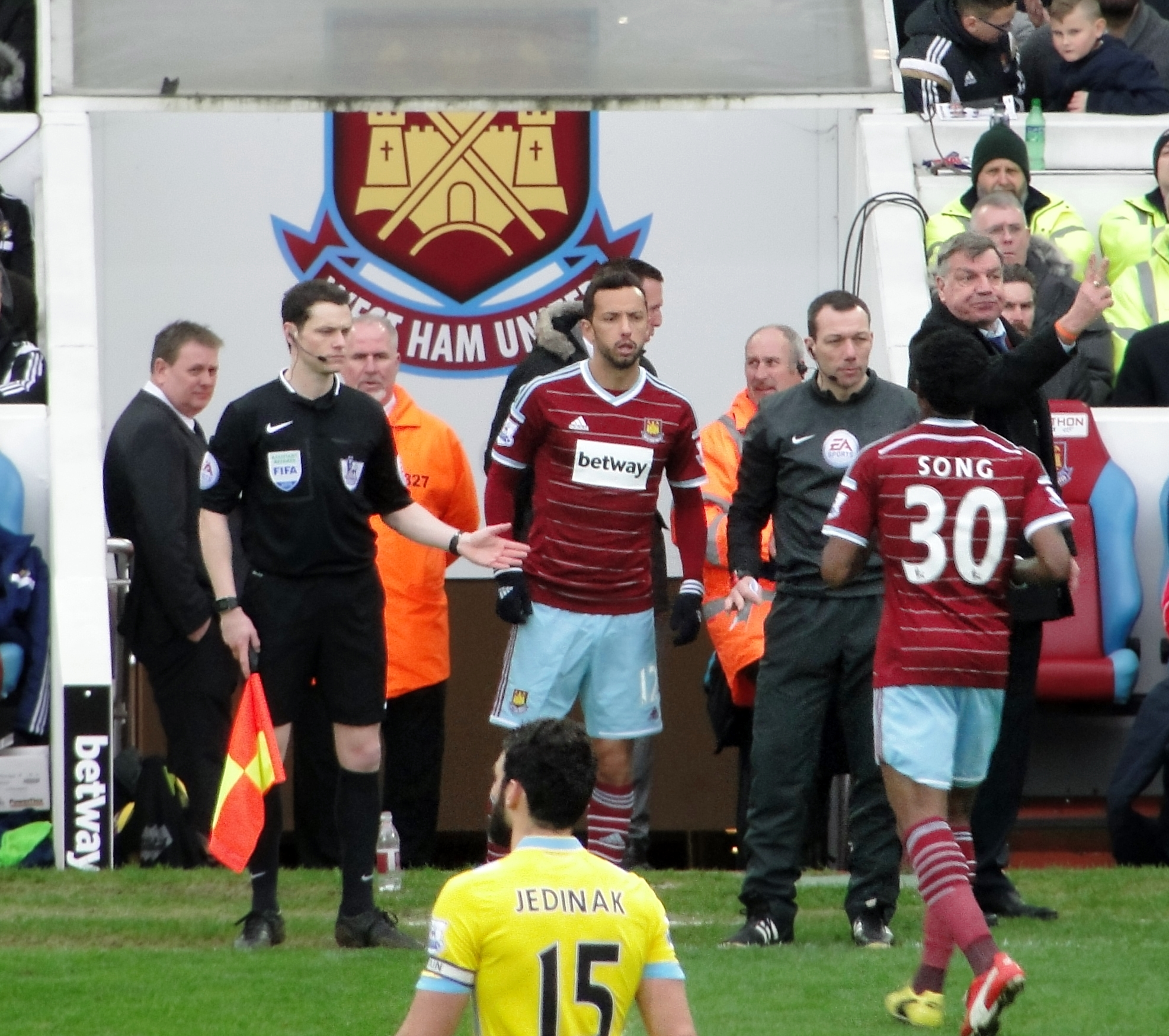
Nenê making his West Ham debut

On 18 February 2015, free agent Nenê signed for West Ham United until the end of the campaign. He made his debut ten days later in a 1–3 home defeat by Crystal Palace by coming on as a 61st minute substitute for Alex Song, and was released at the end of the season following an unsuccessful stint at the Hammers.

=== São Paulo ===
On 26 January 2018, the 36-year-old Nenê agreed to a two-year contract with São Paulo. In an interview held the previous December, he claimed to have been a supporter of the club as a child. He scored his first goal for his new team on 7 February, in a 1–0 win over Bragantino for the Campeonato Paulista.

=== Fluminense ===
After being released, on 15 July 2019, Nenê joined Fluminense until the end of the 2020 season. In the first two months of that year, he scored seven goals across all competitions.

=== Vasco and Juventude ===
After Fluminense, Nenê played for Vasco da Gama between September 2021 and March 2023 and then joined Juventude in April 2023. On 15 August 2024, at 43 years and 26 days old, he became the oldest player to score in the Brasileirão Série A, surpassing the record previously held by Rogério Ceni. He scored again the following August to further extend his record.

=== Botafogo-PB ===
On 10 January 2026, Nenê moved to Série C club Botafogo-PB, signing a one-year contract.

== Personal life ==
In October 2012, Nenê was named an ambassador in France for the game FIFA 13, alongside Karim Benzema and Lionel Messi. In 2010, he signed a deal with Adidas.

Each year, Nenê organised with fellow footballer Neymar a charity match in his hometown of Jundiaí, with the purpose of raising money for food for families in need.

== Career statistics ==
As of match played 10 October 2026

Appearances and goals by club, season and competition
Club	Season	League			State league		National cup (Note: Includes Copa do Brasil, Copa del Rey, Coupe de France)		Continental		Other		Total	
Club	Season	Division	Apps	Goals	Apps	Goals	Apps	Goals	Apps	Goals	Apps	Goals	Apps	Goals
Paulista	2000	Série C							—					
Paulista	2001	Série C							—					
Paulista	2002	Série B	0	0	0	0	—		—		15 (Note: Appearances in Torneio Rio – São Paulo)	6	15	6
Paulista	Total								—				72	26
Palmeiras	2002	Série A	24	5	—		0	0	—		6 (Note: Five appearances, two goals in Copa dos Campeões; one appearance, one goal in Supercampeonato Paulista)	3	30	8
Santos	2003	Série A	25	8	3 (Note: Appearances in Campeonato Paulista)	0	—		13 (Note: Twelve appearances, one goal in Copa Libertadores; one appearance in Copa Sudamericana)	3	—		41	11
Mallorca	2003–04	La Liga	29	2	—		2	0	6 (Note: Appearances in UEFA Cup)	0	—		37	2
Alavés	2004–05	Segunda División	40	12	—		0	0	—		—		40	12
Alavés	2005–06	La Liga	38	9	—		0	0	—		—		38	9
Alavés	Total		78	21	—		0	0	—		—		78	21
Celta	2006–07	La Liga	38	8	—		1	0	9	1	—		48	9
Monaco	2007–08	Ligue 1	28	5	—		1	0	—		2 (Note: Appearances in Coupe de la Ligue)	2	31	7
Monaco	2008–09	Ligue 1	1	0	—		0	0	—		—		1	0
Monaco	2009–10	Ligue 1	34	14	—		6	1	—		1	0	41	15
Monaco	Total		63	19	—		7	1	—		3	2	73	22
Espanyol (loan)	2008–09	La Liga	35	4	—		4	0	—		—		39	4
Paris Saint-Germain	2010–11	Ligue 1	35	14	—		5	2	9 (Note: Appearances in UEFA Europa League)	4	2 (Note: One appearance in Trophée des Champions and one appearance in Coupe de la Ligue)	0	51	20
Paris Saint-Germain	2011–12	Ligue 1	35	21	—		4	4	7	2	1	0	47	27
Paris Saint-Germain	2012–13	Ligue 1	9	1	—		0	0	4 (Note: Appearances in UEFA Champions League)	0	1	0	14	1
Paris Saint-Germain	Total		79	36	—		9	6	20	6	4	0	112	48
Al-Gharafa	2012–13	QSL	6	3	—		0	0	7 (Note: Appearances in AFC Champions League)	2	3	2	16	7
Al-Gharafa	2013–14	QSL	23	10	—		3	1	—		3	0	29	11
Al-Gharafa	2014–15	QSL	14	7	—		0	0	—		—		14	7
Al-Gharafa	Total		43	20	—		3	1	7	2	6	2	59	25
West Ham United	2014–15	Premier League	8	0	—		0	0	—		—		8	0
Vasco da Gama	2015	Série A	20	9	—		3	0	—		—		23	9
Vasco da Gama	2016	Série B	31	13	17 (Note: Appearances in Campeonato Carioca)	7	7	1	—		—		55	21
Vasco da Gama	2017	Série A	31	5	15	3	3	3	—		—		49	8
Vasco da Gama	2018	Série A	0	0	2	1	0	0	—		—		2	1
Vasco da Gama	Total		82	27	34	11	13	4	—		—		129	39
São Paulo	2018	Série A	35	8	12	2	4	2	4 (Note: Appearances in Copa Sudamericana)	0	—		55	12
São Paulo	2019	Série A	2	0	11	0	2	0	2 (Note: Appearances in Copa Libertadores)	0	—		17	0
São Paulo	Total		37	8	23	2	6	2	6	0	0	0	72	12
Fluminense	2019	Série A	25	3	0	0	0	0	2	0	—		27	3
Fluminense	2020	Série A	31	8	13	6	6	6	2	0	—		52	20
Fluminense	2021	Série A	15	1	7	1	5	1	10	2	—		37	5
Fluminense	Total		71	12	20	7	11	7	14	2	0	0	116	28
Vasco da Gama	2021	Série B	14	4	0	0	0	0	—		—		14	4
Vasco da Gama	2022	Série B	33	7	10	5	2	0	—		—		45	12
Vasco da Gama	2023	Série A	0	0	9	1	2	1	—		—		11	2
Vasco da Gama	Total		47	11	19	6	4	1	0	0	0	0	70	18
Juventude	2023	Série B	28	7	—		—		—		—		28	7
Juventude	2024	Série A	28	3	5 (Note: Appearances in Campeonato Gaúcho)	0	3	0	—		—		36	3
Juventude	2025	Série A	25	3	6	0	1	0	—		—		32	3
Juventude	Total		81	13	11	0	4	0	0	0	0	0	96	13
Botafogo-PB	2026	Série C	20	7	11 (Note: Appearances in Campeonato Paraibano)	3	1	0	—		1 (Note: Appearance(s) in Copa do Nordeste)	0	33	10
Career total			760	201	121	29	65	22	75	14	35	13	1113	299

== Honours ==
Paulista

- Campeonato Brasileiro Série C: 2001
- Campeonato Paulista Série A2: 2001

Paris Saint-Germain

- Ligue 1: 2012–13

Vasco da Gama

- Campeonato Carioca: 2016

Fluminense

- Taça Rio: 2020

Botafogo-PB

- Campeonato Paraibano: 2026

Individual

- Ligue 1 Best Foreign Player: 2009–10
- Ligue 1 Top Scorer: 2011–12 (joint)
- UNFP Ligue 1 Team of the Year: 2010–11, 2011–12
- Campeonato Carioca Best Player: 2016
- Campeonato Carioca Team of the Year: 2020

== See also ==
- List of men's footballers with 1,000 or more official appearances
