= Chris Malonga =

Footballer (born 1987)

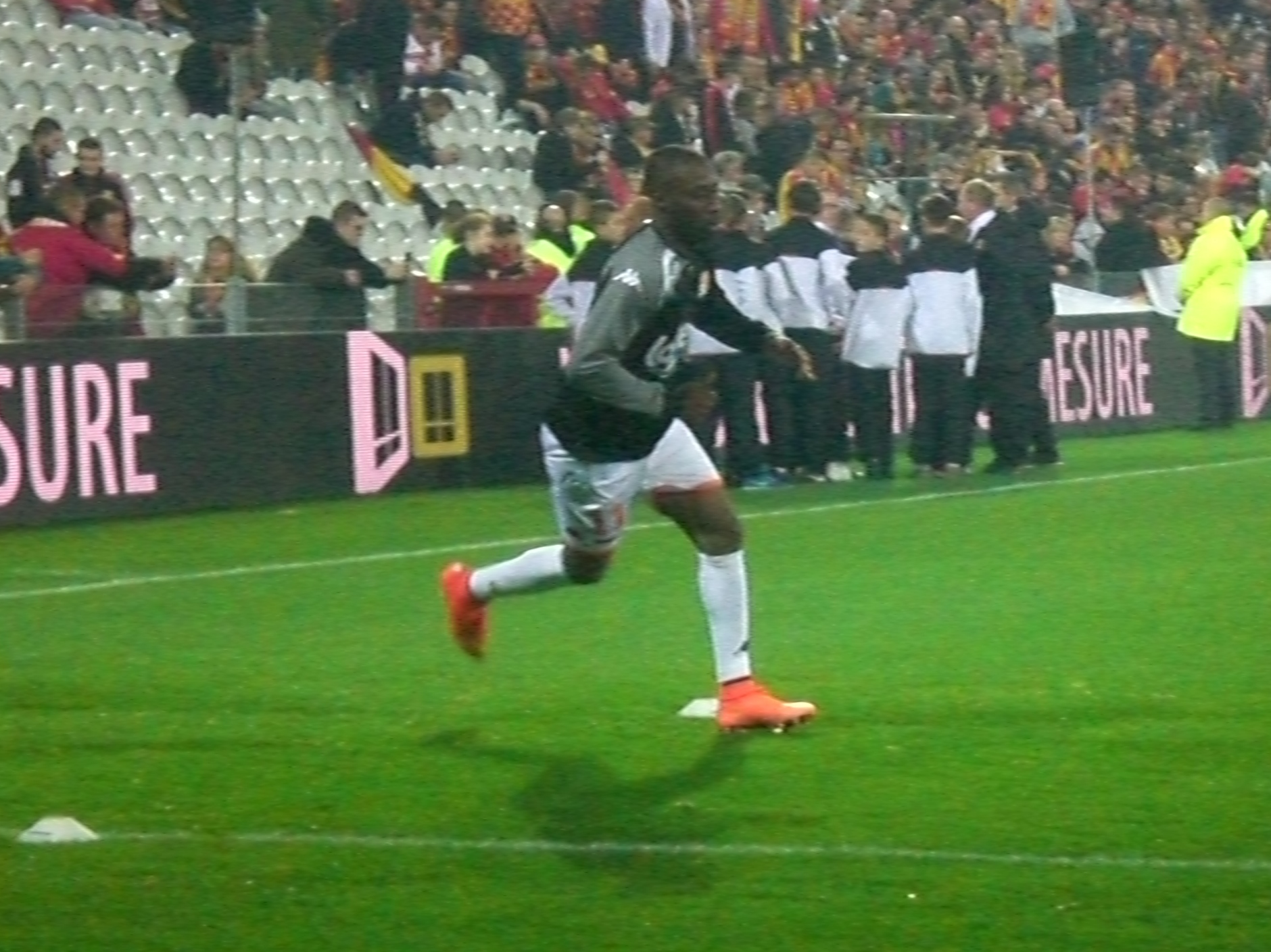
- Malonga with Laval in 2015

Personal information
- Full name: Francis Chris Malonga Ntsayi
- Date of birth: 11 July 1987 (age 39)
- Place of birth: Sens, France
- Height: 1.83 m (6 ft 0 in)
- Position: Winger

Team information
- Current team: Racing Besançon

Youth career
- 2001–2003: Auxerre
- 2003–2004: Louhans-Cuiseaux
- 2004–2007: Nancy

Senior career*
Years	Team	Apps	(Gls)
2007–2010	Nancy	69	(9)
2010–2013	Monaco	24	(4)
2012–2013	→ Lausanne-Sport (loan)	30	(8)
2013–2014	Vitória Guimarães	17	(0)
2014	Vitória Guimarães B	1	(0)
2014–2015	Lausanne-Sport	26	(5)
2015–2017	Laval	48	(3)
2019–2021	Martigues	9	(2)
2021–	Racing Besançon	21	(9)

International career^{‡}
2006–2016	Congo	19	(2)
- * Club domestic league appearances and goals as of 21:06, 16 May 2019 (UTC) ‡ National team caps and goals as of 4 March 2018

Francis Chris Malonga Ntsayi (born 11 July 1987) is a professional footballer who plays as a winger for Racing Besançon. Born in France, he represented Congo at international level.

== Club career ==
=== Youth career and Nancy ===
Malonga was born in Sens, France. After starting in the small club Migennes he moved to Auxerre, he began his career with hometown club AJ Auxerre and spent three years at the club before joining CS Louhans-Cuiseaux. After a year's stint there, he joined Nancy and spent three years in the club's youth academy. He made his professional debut during the 2007–08 season, in a 1–0 win over Caen on 11 August 2007. In the next game, on 16 August 2007, he provided the assist for a Pascal Berenguer goal, which turned out to be a winning goal in a 2–1 win against Nice. Two weeks later, on 25 August 2007, he scored his first Ligue 1 goal in a 4–1 against Auxerre. He went on to establish himself in the first team at the club, under new manager Pablo Correa.

Four months later, he scored the winning goal in a 1–0 win over Bordeaux, leading the club to go onto second place. But when both clubs meet again on 29 March 2008, which Bordeaux won 2–1, he was judged to have fouled opposition player Johan Micoud in the penalty box, leading to a penalty which was converted by Fernando Cavenaghi. TV replays suggested it was the opposite way around. Having been a victim of refereeing errors, Micoud received a one-match ban by the Disciplinary Committee of the Professional Football League, for his role by cheating to win a penalty. Despite this, he scored on the final game of the season in a 3–2 loss against Rennes. At the end of the season, Malonga had a successful debut season, making 32 appearances and scoring 5 goals. He shortly signed a new contract, keeping him until 2011.

In the 2008–09 season Malonga made twelve appearances, due to having a two strain injury, which ruled him out for the rest of the season. In the 2009–10 campaign, he recaptured his form and had a good season scoring 4 goals and 6 assists in 25 league matches, including a two goals in consecutive games against Lille and Le Mans on May. Despite this, ASNL decided to part ways with Malonga. In the 2010–11 season, he made two appearances before leaving for Monaco.

=== Monaco ===
In August 2010, Malonga joined Monaco for the fee of €1 million from Nancy and was assigned the number 7 shirt. On 12 September 2010, he made his debut in a 2–2 draw, against Marseille, having come on as a substitute. Two months later, on 7 November 2010, he scored a brace in a 4–0 win over his former club Nancy. However, the club would be relegated to Ligue 2, due to poor results and Malonga remained at the club despite the club's relegation. The next season, Malonga featured for the last eight games but soon disappeared from the first team, due to new signing.

After two unhappy season at Monaco without making an impact, Malonga went to Switzerland joining Lausanne-Sport on loan for the rest of the season where he will join up with national teammate Matt Moussilou. On 14 July 2012, he made his debut, playing in the left-midfield in a 0–0 draw against Thun and two weeks later, he scored his first goal and provided an assist, in a 5–1 win over Servette. During his time with Lausanne-Sport, Malonga became a key player for the club and was a goalscoring threat throughout the season. He returned to Monaco after his one year in Switzerland.

=== Later career ===
Malonga once again left Monaco in the last days of the transfer window, to sign a one-year contract with Primeira Liga club Vitória de Guimarães.

After one year alone to treat a wound, he joined Martigues in January 2019.

In August 2021, Malonga signed for Racing Besançon.

== International career ==
Born in France, Malonga holds French and Congolese nationalities.

He made his debut with for the Congo national team in 2008.

He represented Congo at the 2015 Africa Cup of Nations, where his team advanced to the quarterfinals.

== Career statistics ==
Scores and results list Congo's goal tally first, score column indicates score after each Malonga goal.

List of international goals scored by Chris Malonga
No.	Date	Venue	Opponent	Score	Result	Competition
1	8 October 2006	Stade Alphonse Massemba-Débat, Brazzaville, Congo	Chad	2–0	3–1	2008 Africa Cup of Nations qualification
2	15 November 2011	Estádio Nacional 12 de Julho, São Tomé, São Tomé and Principe	São Tomé and Príncipe	3–0	5–0	2014 FIFA World Cup qualification
3	9 June 2012	Stade Municipal, Point-Noire, Congo	Niger	1–0	1–0	2014 FIFA World Cup qualification
