= Juan Pablo Pino =

Colombian footballer (born 1987)

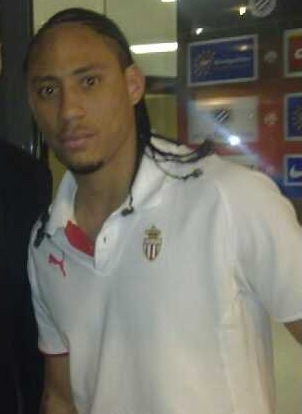
- Pino with Monaco

Personal information
- Full name: Juan Pablo Pino Puello
- Date of birth: 30 March 1987 (age 39)
- Place of birth: Cartagena de Indias, Colombia
- Height: 1.75 m (5 ft 9 in)
- Positions: Forward; winger

Senior career*
Years	Team	Apps	(Gls)
2004–2006	Independiente Medellín	40	(2)
2007–2010	Monaco	65	(6)
2008	→ Charleroi (loan)	4	(0)
2010–2013	Galatasaray	19	(3)
2011–2012	→ Al-Nassr (loan)	13	(5)
2012	Mersin İdman Yurdu	0	(0)
2012–2013	Olympiacos	3	(0)
2013–2014	→ Independiente Medellín (loan)	8	(0)
2014–2015	Bastia	4	(0)
2014	Bastia II	2	(1)
2016	Universitario	4	(1)
2017	Arema	19	(3)
2018	Barito Putera	9	(0)
2019	Cúcuta Deportivo	0	(0)
2021–2022	Real Cartagena	9	(0)
Total		199	(21)

International career
2005–2008	Colombia U20	23	(13)
2008–2010	Colombia	6	(0)
- * Club domestic league appearances and goals

Juan Pablo Pino Puello (born 30 March 1987) is a Colombian former professional footballer who plays as a forward.

== Club career ==
=== Independiente Medellin ===
Pino began his professional career with Independiente Medellín in 2004. He stayed with the Colombian club until the 2006 Finalizacion season.

=== Monaco ===
In January 2007, Pino joined AS Monaco. On 10 February 2007, Pino played his first Ligue 1 match for Monaco against Paris Saint-Germain. In January 2008, he was loaned out to Sporting Charleroi of Belgium. He returned for the 2008–09 season, which was one of the best of his career, where he scored six goals in 23 appearances, including a brace against Stade Rennais on 18 April 2009.

=== Galatasaray ===
On 19 July 2010, Galatasaray announced that Pino had joined the team on a three-year contract for a sum of €3 million. He made his debut in the Europa League qualifying round match against OFK Beograd on 29 July.

He was picked man of the match during the Istanbul derby against Fenerbahçe which finished 0–0 on 24 October 2010. Pino scored his first goal for the club on 30 October 2010 against Antalyaspor, a match which ended in a 2–1 victory for Galatasaray.

Before the 2011–12 season, the new Galatasaray manager, Fatih Terim left him in Istanbul and did not call him for a pre-season camp. On 29 August he left on loan to for Al-Nassr for €400,000. Pino scored his first goal for Al Nassr with a free kick in a 2–1 loss against Al-Ettifaq. He went on to score four more goals for the Saudi Arabian club, before a foot injury in February cut his season short.

After Pino returned from his loan spell at Al Nassr, he expressed his interest to stay at Galatasaray, however Terim refused Pino's interest to stay at the Turkish club and his contract was terminated.

=== Mersin İdman Yurdu ===
On 20 July 2012, Pino signed for another Turkish club, Mersin İdman Yurdu, for a fee of €100,000 on a two-year contract. However, after the team's training camp in Slovenia, the club and the player mutually terminated their contract. The club cited inability to adjust to the club as the reason for the termination.

=== Olympiacos ===
On 14 September 2012, Pino was in talks with the Greek club, Olympiacos F.C. to play for the team in the 2013 season. He made his debut against Veria in a 3–0 home win, contributing two assists. However, he only made a few appearances throughout the season due to injury complications, and left the club at the end of the season.

=== Independiente Medellín ===
On 29 July 2013, Pino returned to his homeland to play for Independiente Medellin, the club where he began his career. Pino only made eight league appearances out of twenty games, failing to score any goals, and was only included once in the starting XI. In October 2013, his contract was terminated, with the club citing injury problems and indiscipline as the reason for the termination. It was also reported that the player had skipped trainings and refused a drug and alcohol test, after suspicion that he had arrived to training drunk.

=== Bastia ===
In 2014, Pino joined French club Bastia of Ligue 2.

=== Arema ===
On 17 April 2017, Pino joined the Indonesian club side, Arema. He signed one-year deal and used the number 20 for the 2017 Liga 1 season.

== International career ==
Pino is also a Colombian international having previously played for the under-20 team. He made his national team debut in 2009.

== Personal life ==
In 2011, while playing for Al Nasr, Pino was taken into custody by Saudi moral police after mall customers complained about his religious tattoos. Pino later apologized for his actions and was released from custody after a team delegate discussed the matter with police.

== Honours ==
Independiente Medellín

- Categoría Primera A: 2004

Olympiacos

- Super League Greece: 2012–13
