= Cédric Mongongu =

Congolese footballer (born 1989)

Personal information
- Date of birth: 22 June 1989 (age 37)
- Place of birth: Kinshasa, Zaire
- Height: 1.89 m (6 ft 2 in)
- Position: Centre back

Youth career
- 2002–2005: RCF Paris
- 2005–2007: Monaco

Senior career*
Years	Team	Apps	(Gls)
2007–2011	Monaco	94	(0)
2011–2015	Evian	98	(7)
2015–2016	Eskişehirspor	5	(0)
2016–2017	Montpellier	4	(0)
2018–2019	Politehnica Iași	3	(0)

International career^{‡}
2008–	DR Congo	40	(2)
- * Club domestic league appearances and goals as of 08:09, 10 December 2022 (UTC) ‡ National team caps and goals as of 20:31, 10 October 2016 (UTC)

Cédric Mongongu (born 22 June 1989) is a Congolese professional footballer who plays as a centre back for the DR Congo national team.

== Club career ==
Mongongu began playing for his local club in La Garenne-Colombes before joining RCF Paris in 2002.

=== Monaco ===
He proceeded to join the Centre of Formation at Monaco in 2005 before making his first appearance in a 1–1 draw with Saint-Étienne on 4 August 2007. On 3 July 2009, he signed his first professional contract with Monaco. He went on to make a total of 92 appearances for the club.

In 2011, Mongongu joined Evian, making his debut on 21 September 2011 against Marseille. In 2015, he joined Eskişehirspor. After only one match his contract was terminated in January 2016.

== International career ==
Mongongu chose to represent the country of his birth at international level DR Congo.

== Personal life ==
Mongongu was born in Kinshasa, Zaire, but moved to France as a child growing up in La Garenne-Colombes, Hauts-de-Seine.

== Career statistics ==
=== International ===
Appearances and goals by national team and year
National team	Year	Apps	Goals
DR Congo	2008	7	0
DR Congo	2009	2	0
DR Congo	2010	2	0
DR Congo	2011	1	0
DR Congo	2012	5	0
DR Congo	2013	7	0
DR Congo	2014	6	2
DR Congo	2015	10	0
Total		40	2

Scores and results list DR Congo's goal tally first, score column indicates score after each Mongongu goal.

List of international goals scored by Cédric Mongongu
No.	Date	Venue	Opponent	Score	Result	Competition	Ref.
1	11 October 2014	Stade des Martyrs, Kinshasa, Democratic Republic of the Congo	Ivory Coast	1–1	1–2	2015 Africa Cup of Nations qualification	
2	19 November 2014	Stade Tata Raphaël, Kinshasa, Democratic Republic of the Congo	Sierra Leone	2–1	3–1	2015 Africa Cup of Nations qualification	

== Honors ==
=== National ===
DR Congo

- Africa Cup of Nations bronze:2015
