= Jean-Jacques Gosso =

Ivorian footballer (born 1983)

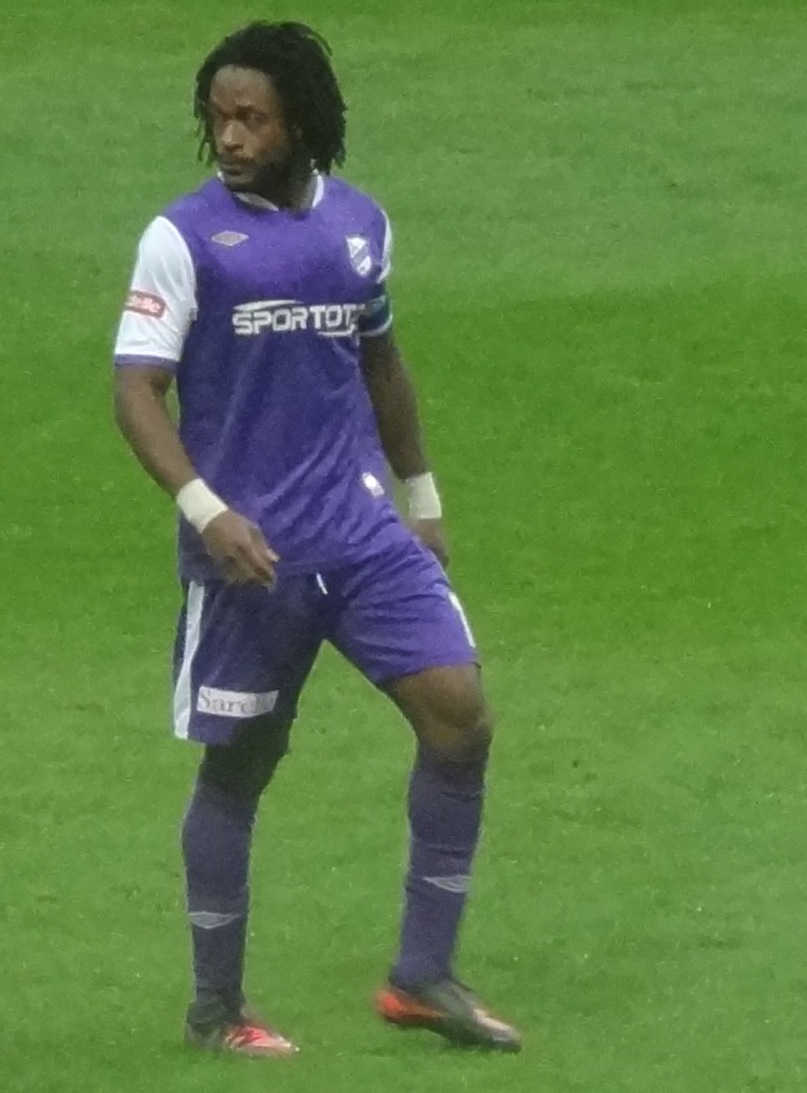
- Gosso playing for Orduspor in 2012

Personal information
- Full name: Jean-Jacques Gosso Gosso
- Date of birth: 15 March 1983 (age 43)
- Place of birth: Abidjan, Ivory Coast
- Height: 1.77 m (5 ft 10 in)
- Position: Defensive midfielder

Youth career
- 1996–2000: Stella Club

Senior career*
Years	Team	Apps	(Gls)
2000–2002	Stella Club	24	(1)
2003–2007	Wydad Casablanca	33	(2)
2007–2008	Ashdod	44	(2)
2008–2011	Monaco	61	(1)
2011–2012	Orduspor	23	(0)
2012–2013	Mersin İdmanyurdu	6	(0)
2013–2015	Gençlerbirliği	57	(1)
2015–2017	Göztepe	64	(1)
Total		312	(8)

International career
2008–2013	Ivory Coast	22	(0)
- * Club domestic league appearances and goals

Jean-Jacques Gosso Gosso (born 15 March 1983) is an Ivorian former professional footballer who played as a defensive midfielder. He played in Ivory Coast, Israel, Morocco, France and Turkey. He made 22 appearances for the Ivory Coast national team, and was part of the squads at the 2010 and 2012 African Cup of Nations.

== Club career ==
=== Stella Club ===
Born in Abidjan, Ivory Coast Gosso started his career at Stella Club d'Adjamé. In 2004, he moved to Wydad Casablanca in Morocco until the end of his contract in 2006. After that he traveled to Israel to discuss terms with Maccabi Tel Aviv in 2006. Due to financial constraints at the club, they were unable to come up the player's financial requirements.

=== Ashdod ===
Months later Gosso's name came up again but this time word had spread that F.C. Ashdod had agreed terms with the player and that he was due to sign a contract. In the end, Gosso did indeed join F.C. Ashdod where he immediately received a starting position in his first league match against Maccabi Tel Aviv.

=== Monaco ===
On 8 July 2008, it was announced that Gosso would go on trial with Monégasque side AS Monaco FC. On 22 July 2008, it was announced that Monaco would sign Gosso after the successful trial on a three-year contract.

=== Orduspor ===
Gosso signed a three-year contract with the Turkish Süper Lig club Orduspor in July 2011. On 18 October 2012, Gosso left the club after his contract was terminated two years early by mutual consent.

After finishing the 2012–2013 season at Mersin İdmanyurdu, Gosso signed a one-year contract at Ankara's Gençlerbirliği.

== International career ==
He was member of the Ivory Coast U-20 squad in 2003 FIFA World Youth Championship in United Arab Emirates.

He was called up to the senior squad for the first time in 2008, and was named as part of the Elephants squad for the 2010 African Cup of Nations in Angola.

He was selected for the 2012 African Cup of Nations in Equatorial Guinea and Gabon, playing mostly at right-back.

== Career statistics ==
=== International ===
Ivory Coast national team
Year	Apps	Goals
2008	1	0
2009	3	0
2010	1	0
2011	3	0
2012	11	0
2013	3	0
Total	22	0

== Honours ==
- Botola: 2006
- Coupe de France runner-up: 2010

Ivory Coast

- Africa Cup of Nations runner-up:2012
