= Mathieu Coutadeur =

French footballer (born 1986)

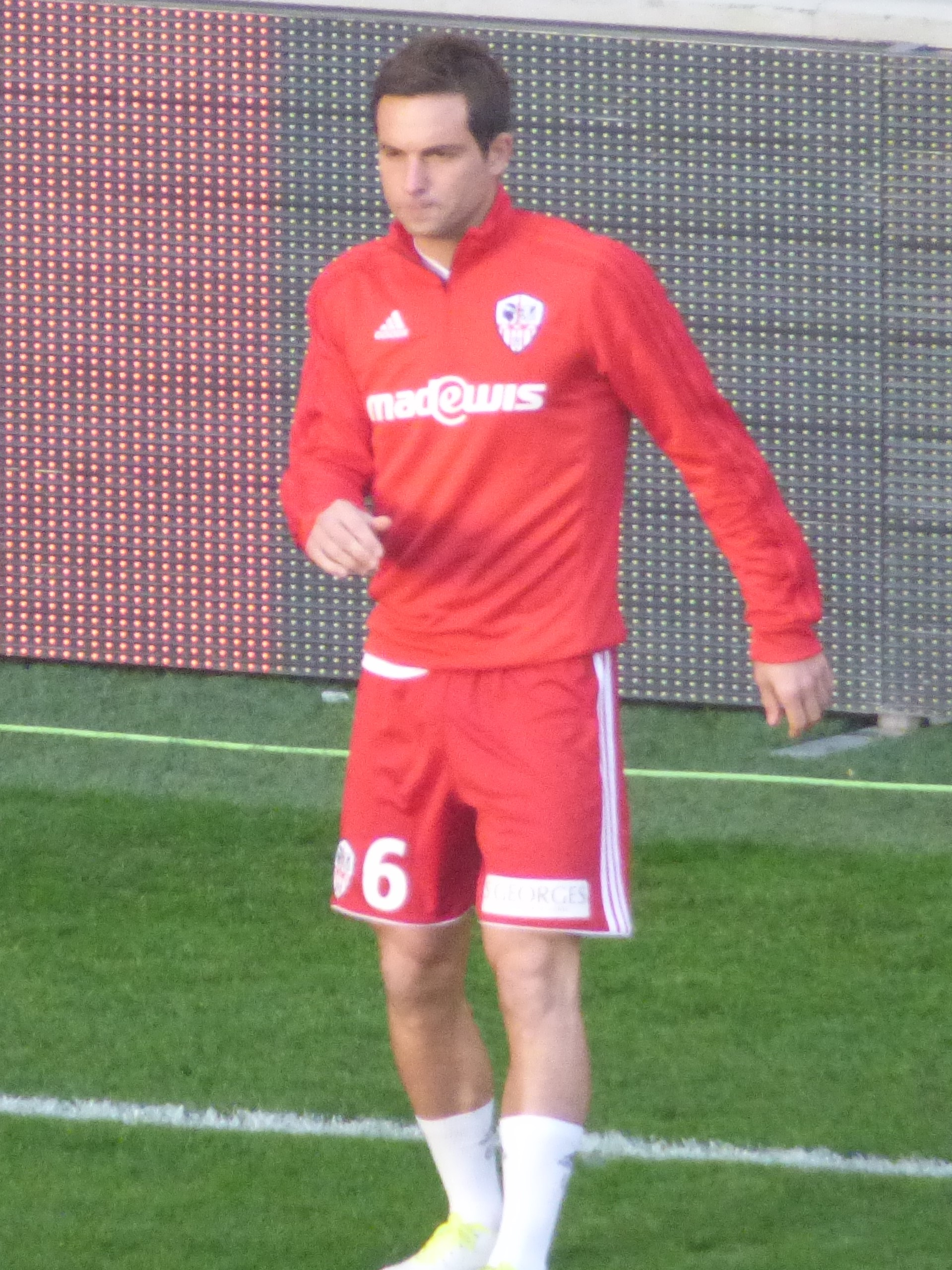
- Coutadeur with Ajaccio in 2018

Personal information
- Date of birth: 20 March 1986 (age 40)
- Place of birth: Le Mans, France
- Height: 1.69 m (5 ft 7 in)
- Position: Midfielder

Youth career
- 1993–1996: Le Mans
- 1996–1999: US Le Mans
- 1999–2005: Le Mans

Senior career*
Years	Team	Apps	(Gls)
2005–2009	Le Mans	105	(8)
2009–2011	Monaco	37	(1)
2010	Monaco B	3	(0)
2011–2015	Lorient	62	(3)
2012–2014	Lorient B	4	(0)
2015–2016	AEL Limassol	32	(1)
2016–2017	Laval	35	(5)
2017–2023	Ajaccio	152	(12)
2023–2024	Le Mans	21	(1)
Total		451	(31)

International career
2006–2008	France U21	7	(0)
- * Club domestic league appearances and goals

Mathieu Coutadeur (born 20 March 1986) is a French former professional footballer who played as a midfielder.

== Club career ==
Coutadeur played for his hometown club Le Mans between 2005 and 2009. He played an important role in Le Mans' 2007–08 season, helping them finish in the top half of Ligue 1. He played over 100 games for the club before changing clubs.

On 31 August 2009, Coutadeur signed a four-year contract with Monaco for €4 million.
