= Igor Lolo =

Ivorian footballer (born 1982)

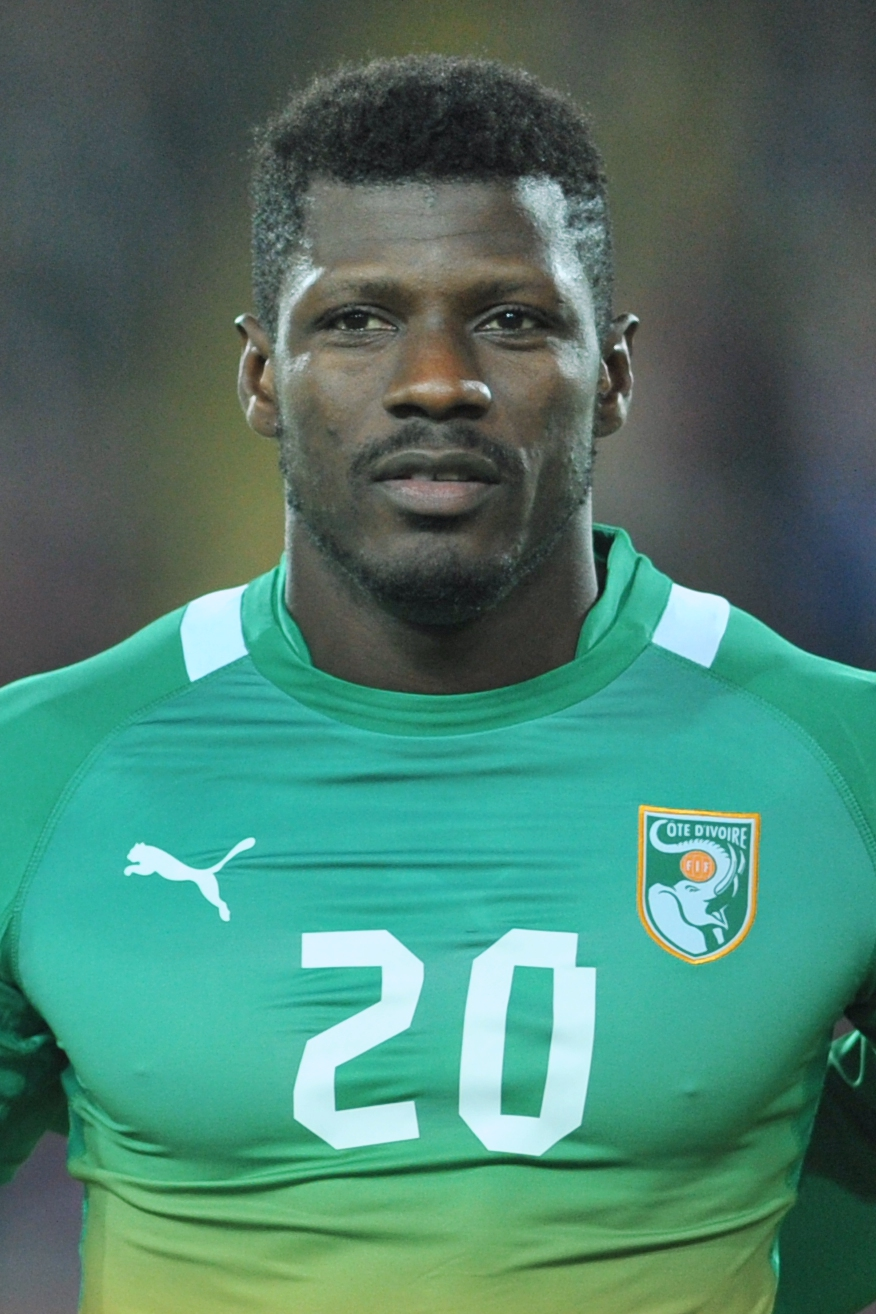
- Playing for Ivory Coast in 2012

Personal information
- Full name: Igor Alexandre Lolo
- Date of birth: 22 July 1982 (age 44)
- Place of birth: Adzopé, Ivory Coast
- Height: 1.80 m (5 ft 11 in)
- Position: Defender

Youth career
- ASEC Mimosas

Senior career*
Years	Team	Apps	(Gls)
2002–2003	ASEC Mimosas	14	(1)
2003–2004	Beveren	10	(1)
2004–2005	Metalurh Donetsk	13	(0)
2005–2007	Beerschot	41	(4)
2007–2008	Racing Genk	27	(0)
2008–2009	Dnipro Dnipropetrovsk	3	(0)
2009–2011	Monaco	43	(2)
2011–2013	Kuban Krasnodar	34	(0)
2013–2015	Rostov	23	(0)
2016	Westerlo	0	(0)
Total		208	(8)

International career
2008–2013	Ivory Coast	19	(0)
- * Club domestic league appearances and goals

Igor Alexandre Lolo (born 22 July 1982) is an Ivorian former professional footballer who played as a defender.

== Club career ==
Born in Adzopé, Ivory Coast, Lolo started his career with ASEC Mimosas where he was spotted by K.S.K. Beveren who signed him a contract to play in Belgium. He stayed there one season before leaving for FC Metalurh Donetsk. After one season in Donetsk, he chose to come back to Belgium and was signed by K.F.C. Germinal Beerschot. After two seasons with Beerschot, he went to KRC Genk. Lolo moved to FC Dnipro Dnipropetrovsk in September 2008 for €4 million, before signing a two-and-a-half-year deal with AS Monaco on 28 January 2009.

In the summer of 2013, Lolo signed a two-year contract with FC Rostov. Previously, he played for fellow Russian Premier League side Kuban Krasnodar, but had his contract with them terminated in April 2013.

In 2016, he joined Westerlo.

== International career ==
Lolo received his first cap in the friendly match against Paraguay at Kirin Cup on 22 May 2008.

== Career statistics ==
=== International ===
Ivory Coast national team
Year	Apps	Goals
2008	6	0
2009	0	0
2010	0	0
2011	3	0
2012	8	0
2013	2	0
Total	19	0

== Honours ==
ASEC Mimosas

- Côte d'Ivoire Premier Division: 2003
- Coupe de Côte d'Ivoire de football: 2003

Beveren

- Belgian Cup: 2003-2004 runners-up

AS Monaco

- Coupe de France: 2010 runners-up

Rostov

- Russian Cup: 2013–14

Ivory Coast

- Africa Cup of Nations: 2012 runners-up
