= Vincent Muratori =

French footballer (born 1987)

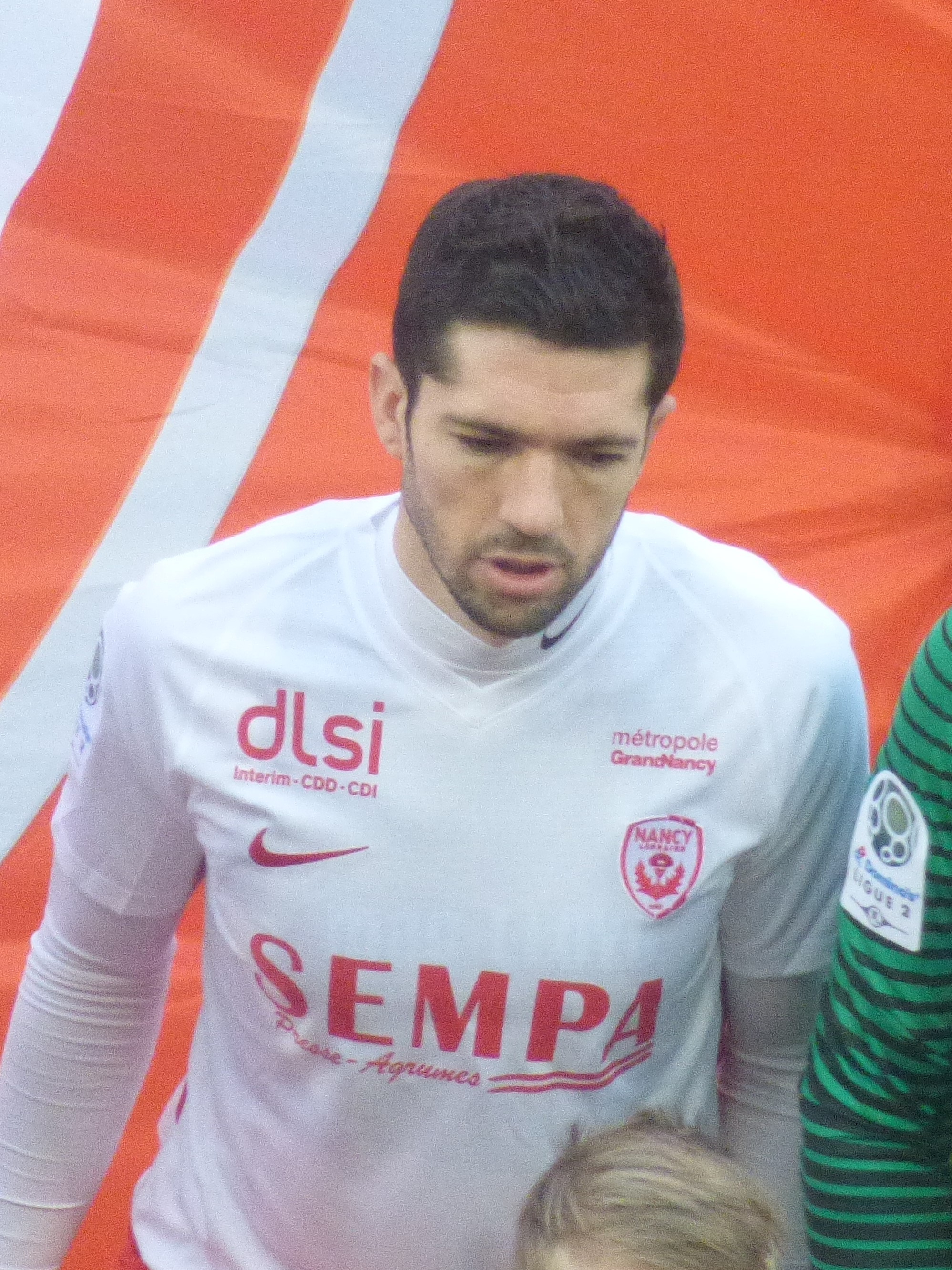
- Muratori in 2019

Personal information
- Full name: Vincent Muratori
- Date of birth: 3 August 1987 (age 39)
- Place of birth: Orange, France
- Height: 1.78 m (5 ft 10 in)
- Position: Defender

Youth career
- 2002–2007: Monaco

Senior career*
Years	Team	Apps	(Gls)
2007–2012	Monaco	73	(0)
2011–2012	Monaco B	4	(0)
2012–2013	Nancy B	11	(1)
2012–2020	Nancy	181	(1)
2021–2023	Pays de Grasse	45	(1)

International career
2008	France U21	3	(0)
- * Club domestic league appearances and goals

Vincent Muratori (born 3 August 1987) is a retired French professional footballer who played as a defender. He began his football career at Monaco.
