= Jonathan Pérez (footballer, born 1987) =

French footballer

Personal information
- Full name: Jonathan Pérez
- Date of birth: 18 June 1987 (age 39)
- Place of birth: Clamart, France
- Height: 1.82 m (5 ft 11 1/2 in)
- Position: Midfielder

Team information
- Current team: SO Chambéry Foot
- Number: 5

Senior career*
Years	Team	Apps	(Gls)
2007–2010	ESTAC B	14	(0)
2007–2009	Troyes AC	6	(0)
2010–	SO Chambéry Foot	1	(0)
- * Club domestic league appearances and goals

Jonathan Pérez (born 18 June 1987 in Clamart) is a footballer, who currently plays for SO Chambéry Foot.

== Career ==
He has played in Ligue 2 for Troyes AC before joining SO Chambéry Foot in July 2009.
