= Loïc Dufau =

French footballer (born 1989)

Personal information
- Date of birth: 15 March 1989 (age 37)
- Place of birth: Marseille, France
- Height: 1.77 m (5 ft 10 in)
- Position: Midfielder

Team information
- Current team: GOAL FC
- Number: 6

Senior career*
Years	Team	Apps	(Gls)
2007–2011	Monaco B	59	(9)
2009–2010	→ Cassis Carnoux (loan)	26	(2)
2011–2013	Gazélec Ajaccio	55	(0)
2013–2015	Poiré-sur-Vie	50	(1)
2013–2015	Poiré-sur-Vie B	8	(0)
2015–2016	Lokomotiv Plovdiv	9	(0)
2016–2017	Toulon	12	(0)
2016	Toulon B	1	(0)
2017	Sedan	15	(0)
2017–2022	Le Puy	113	(11)
2022–	GOAL FC	42	(2)
- * Club domestic league appearances and goals as of 16 January 2024

Loïc Dufau (born 15 March 1989) is a French professional footballer who plays as a midfielder for GOAL FC.

== Career ==
Dufau started his career with Monaco, where he made 59 league appearances for the reserve team, and also had a loan spell at Championnat National side Cassis Carnoux during the 2009–10 season.

Dufau was a regular starter in the Gazélec Ajaccio team that won promotion to Ligue 2 for the first time in the club's history in 2012.

On 7 August 2015, it was announced that Dufau had signed for Bulgarian club Lokomotiv Plovdiv, signing a 1-year contract. He made his A Group debut on the following day against Litex Lovech.

On 8 July 2022, Dufau signed with Championnat National 2 club GOAL FC.

== Honours ==
Le Puy

- Championnat National 2: 2021–22
