= Yohan Mollo =

French footballer (born 1989)

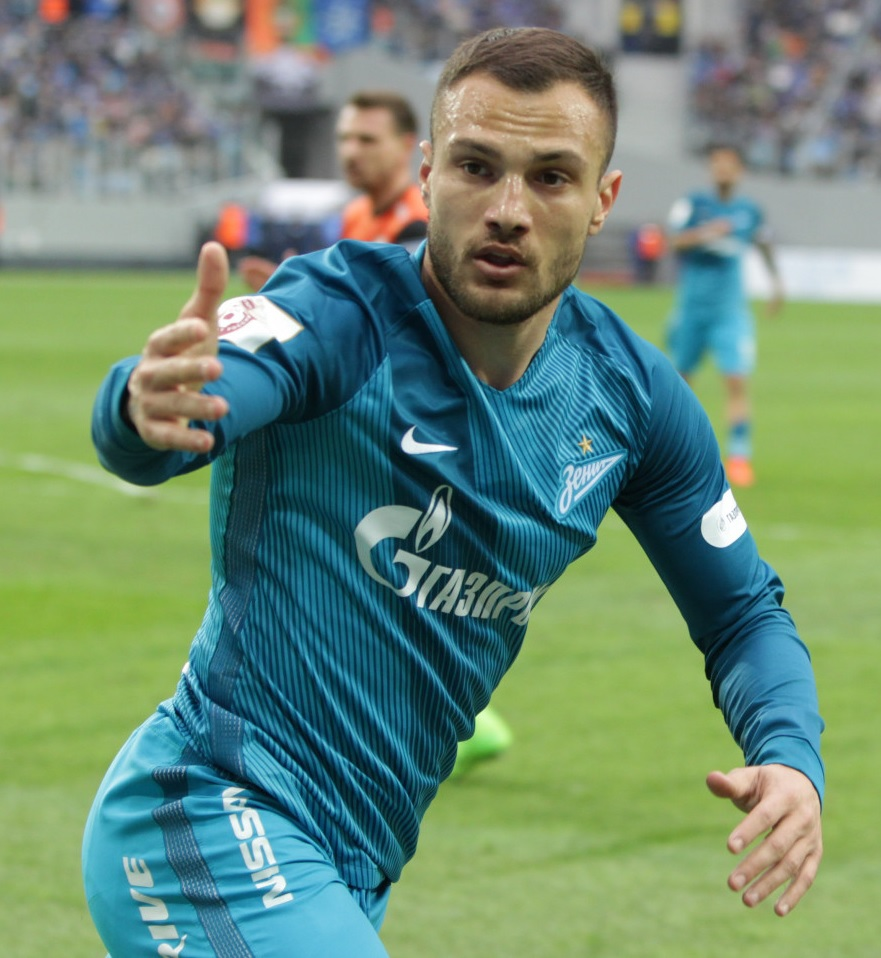
- Mollo with Zenit Saint Petersburg

Personal information
- Date of birth: 18 July 1989 (age 37)
- Place of birth: Martigues, France
- Height: 1.74 m (5 ft 9 in)
- Positions: Winger; right-back

Team information
- Current team: Berre SpC

Youth career
- 1996–2003: Marseille
- 2003–2004: Aubagne
- 2004–2008: Monaco

Senior career*
Years	Team	Apps	(Gls)
2008–2011	Monaco	42	(2)
2010–2011	→ Caen II (loan)	2	(0)
2010–2011	→ Caen (loan)	35	(4)
2011–2012	Granada	6	(0)
2011–2012	→ Nancy (loan)	19	(3)
2012–2013	Nancy	17	(3)
2012–2013	Nancy II	1	(0)
2012–2013	→ Saint-Étienne (loan)	19	(4)
2013–2016	Saint-Étienne II	4	(2)
2013–2016	Saint-Étienne	51	(5)
2015–2016	→ Krylia Sovetov Samara (loan)	23	(0)
2016–2017	Krylia Sovetov Samara	12	(5)
2017	Zenit Saint Petersburg	7	(1)
2017	→ Zenit-2 Saint Petersburg	4	(0)
2017–2018	Fulham	6	(0)
2018	Al-Rayyan	0	(0)
2018	Krylia Sovetov Samara	7	(0)
2019	Sochaux	16	(2)
2019–2021	Panathinaikos	29	(1)
2020	→ Orléans (loan)	6	(0)
2021–2023	Hyères	52	(2)
2023–2024	Istres	25	(1)
2024–2025	Olympique Alès	12	(0)
2025–	Berre SpC		

International career
2008–2010	France U21	8	(0)
- * Club domestic league appearances and goals as of 17 May 2025

Yohan Mollo (born 18 July 1989) is a French professional footballer who plays as a winger or right-back for Régional 1 club Berre SpC.

== Career ==
=== Youth career ===
Mollo began his football career with Olympique de Marseille in 1996, who were at the time attempting to bounce back from the bribery scandal the club had endured in the early 1990s. After spending nearly eight years in Marseille's youth system, Mollo had a one-year spell at local club Aubagne FC before moving to the principality-based side Monaco.

=== Monaco ===
Just before the end of the 06–07 season, Mollo and Monaco agreed to terms on a professional contract with the player signing for three years.

Mollo was promoted to the first-team and handed the number 26 kit for the 2008–09 season. He made his professional debut on 18 October 2008 in a 1–2 loss to OGC Nice appearing as a substitute.

On 7 December 2009, Mollo signed his first professional contract with Monaco.

=== Krylia Sovetov Samara ===
In the summer of 2015, he joined Krylia Sovetov Samara in the Russian Football Premier League on loan. On 29 August 2015, in his second game and first start for Krylia Sovetov he assisted on all three goals as his new club unexpectedly defeated the reigning champion FC Zenit Saint Petersburg with a score of 3–1 in an away game. On 31 August 2016, he moved to Krylia Sovetov on a permanent basis.

=== Zenit St. Petersburg ===
On 10 January 2017, he signed a 3.5-year contract with Zenit Saint Petersburg on a €3 million transfer fee. Before the 2017–18 season, Zenit hired Roberto Mancini as their new manager and Mollo was moved to the second-tier farm-club FC Zenit-2 Saint Petersburg. On 26 July 2017, he brought attention on himself by showing the middle finger to Zenit Saint Petersburg fans when being substituted. On 30 August 2017, he was released from his Zenit contract by mutual consent.

=== Fulham ===
On 31 August 2017, Mollo signed for championship side Fulham, signing a two-year contract. On 30 January 2018, Fulham announced the mutual termination of Mollo's contract, after featuring just six times for the club during his five months, and failing to play a full 90 minutes once.

=== Return to Krylia Sovetov Samara ===
On 6 September 2018, he returned to Russia, rejoining Krylia Sovetov Samara on a one-year deal. He left Krylia Sovetov in January 2019.

=== Sochaux ===
On 28 January 2019, he signed with Sochaux until the end of the 2018–19 season.

=== Panathinaikos ===
On 25 July 2019, Mollo joined Panathinaikos on a two-year contract.

In January 2020 he joined Ligue 2 side US Orléans on loan for the rest of the season. He made six appearances while Orléans placed last in the league when the season was abandoned due to the COVID-19 pandemic.

On 23 October 2020, after 11 months he is again part of Panathinaikos' squad. Specifically, the French winger had played for last time on 24 November 2019 in a match against Panetolikos, as a late substitution. After a quarrel with club's coach Georgios Donis, before a Super League Greece match with Xanthi F.C. he was loaned out, to return in the summer of 2020, with ex- Panathinaikos coach Dani Poyatos not counting on him.

=== Olympique Alès ===
On 5 December 2024, Mollo signed with Olympique Alès in the fifth-tier Championnat National 3.

== Personal life ==
Mollo is of half Italian, and half Romani descent. He is the cousin of André-Pierre Gignac.

== Career statistics ==
As of match played 18:08, 12 May 2021 (UTC).

Appearances and goals by club, season and competition
Club	Season	League			National cup		League cup		Continental		Total	
Club	Season	Division	Apps	Goals	Apps	Goals	Apps	Goals	Apps	Goals	Apps	Goals
Monaco	2008–09	Ligue 1	24	2	0	0	0	0	—		24	2
Monaco	2009–10	Ligue 1	18	0	0	0	1	0	—		19	0
Monaco	Total		42	2	0	0	1	0	0	0	43	2
Caen II (loan)	2010–11	CFA	2	0	—		—		—		2	0
Caen (loan)	2010–11	Ligue 1	35	4	1	0	2	0	—		38	4
Granada	2011–12	La Liga	6	0	1	0	—		—		7	0
Nancy (loan)	2011–12	Ligue 1	19	3	0	0	0	0	—		19	3
Nancy	2012–13	Ligue 1	17	3	0	0	1	0	—		18	3
Nancy	2013–14	Ligue 2	2	0	0	0	0	0	—		2	0
Nancy	Total		19	3	0	0	1	0	0	0	20	3
Nancy II	2012–13	CFA	1	0	—		—		—		1	0
Saint-Étienne (loan)	2012–13	Ligue 1	19	4	4	0	2	0	—		25	4
Saint-Étienne II	2013–14	CFA 2	2	1	—		—		—		2	1
Saint-Étienne II	2014–15	CFA	2	1	—		—		—		2	1
Saint-Étienne II	Total		4	2	0	0	0	0	0	0	4	2
Saint-Étienne	2013–14	Ligue 1	17	1	1	0	1	0	—		19	1
Saint-Étienne	2014–15	Ligue 1	23	4	5	0	1	0	2	0	31	4
Saint-Étienne	2015–16	Ligue 1	1	0	0	0	0	0	2	0	3	0
Saint-Étienne	Total		51	5	6	0	2	0	4	0	63	5
Krylia Sovetov (loan)	2015–16	Russian Premier League	23	0	2	0	—		—		25	0
Krylia Sovetov	2016–17	Russian Premier League	12	5	1	0	—		—		13	5
Zenit Saint Petersburg	2016–17	Russian Premier League	7	1	0	0	—		—		7	1
Zenit-2 Saint Petersburg	2017–18	Russian National Football League	4	0	—		—		—		4	0
Fulham	2017–18	EFL Championship	6	0	0	0	0	0	—		6	0
Krylia Sovetov	2018–19	Russian Premier League	7	0	0	0	—		—		7	0
Sochaux	2018–19	Ligue 2	16	2	0	0	0	0	—		16	2
Panathinaikos	2019-20	Super League 1	5	1	1	0	0	0	—		6	1
Panathinaikos	2020-21	Super League 1	24	0	2	0	0	0	—		26	0
Panathinaikos	Total		29	1	3	0	0	0	0	0	32	1
Orléans (loan)	2019–20	Ligue 2	6	0	0	0	0	0	—		6	0
Career total			281	32	16	0	8	0	4	0	306	32

== Honours ==
Saint-Étienne

- Coupe de la Ligue: 2012–13
