= Alejandro Alonso (footballer) =

Argentine footballer (born 1982)

Personal information
- Full name: Alejandro César Alonso
- Date of birth: 3 March 1982 (age 44)
- Place of birth: Buenos Aires, Argentina
- Height: 1.72 m (5 ft 8 in)
- Position: Midfielder

Senior career*
Years	Team	Apps	(Gls)
2001–2005	Huracán	34	(5)
2005–2008	Bordeaux	83	(4)
2008–2011	Monaco	44	(5)
2011–2013	Saint-Étienne	29	(1)
Total		190	(15)
- * Club domestic league appearances and goals

Alejandro César Alonso (born 3 March 1982) is an Argentine former professional footballer who played as a midfielder. Having started his career with Club Atlético Huracán in Argentina, he went on to play for Girondins de Bordeaux, AS Monaco, and AS Saint-Étienne in France.

== Career ==
Alonso signed a two-year deal in January 2011 with Saint-Étienne.
