= Serge Gakpé =

Togolese footballer (born 1987)

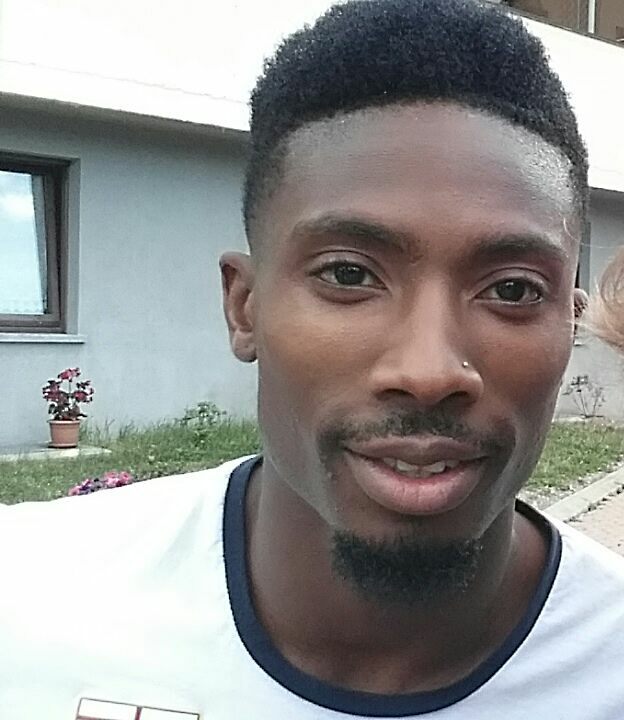
- Gakpé in 2016

Personal information
- Full name: Serge Gakpé
- Date of birth: 7 May 1987 (age 39)
- Place of birth: Bondy, France
- Height: 1.76 m (5 ft 9 in)
- Positions: Winger; attacking midfielder

Team information
- Current team: APEA Akrotiri
- Number: 87

Youth career
- 1995–2001: UMS Pontault-Combault
- 2001–2004: AS Monaco

Senior career*
Years	Team	Apps	(Gls)
2004–2005	Monaco B	38	(15)
2006–2011	Monaco	92	(9)
2010	→ Tours (loan)	17	(5)
2011–2015	Nantes	124	(22)
2012	→ Standard Liège (loan)	19	(1)
2015–2017	Genoa	20	(4)
2016	→ Atalanta (loan)	5	(0)
2017	→ Chievo (loan)	8	(0)
2017–2018	Amiens	29	(3)
2018–2019	Cercle Brugge	26	(5)
2019–2021	Apollon Limassol	20	(6)
2021–2022	Karmiotissa	16	(3)
2023–	APEA	4	(0)

International career
2002–2003	France U16	9	(0)
2003–2004	France U17	3	(1)
2004–2005	France U18	10	(0)
2005–2006	France U19	8	(0)
2007–2008	France U21	6	(1)
2009–2017	Togo	45	(4)
- * Club domestic league appearances and goals as of 1 June 2022 (UTC)

Serge Gakpé (born 7 May 1987) is a professional footballer who plays as a right winger. Born in France, he played for France national teams at youth level before switching to the Togo national team.

== Club career ==
Gakpé began his career playing for his local club UMS Pontault-Combault, whom AS Monaco share a partnership with. During his time in Pontault-Combault, he regularly attended sessions at the Clairefontaine academy. After being recommended to the Ligue 1 side by Pontault-Combault and Clairefontaine officials, he agreed to join the principality-based side in 2001.

Despite not having a professional contract, he joined the first-team squad following the winter break of the 2005–06 season, making his professional debut in a 1–1 draw against RC Lens on 22 January 2006. Not only did he start the match, but also scored his first professional goal, in the 7th minute. He went on to play in 13 more matches and added another goal to his tally as well.

Serge then signed his first professional contract on 4 January 2007, inking a three-year deal with the club. He later added another year to the contract, which tied him to Monaco until 2011. Over the next three seasons, his playing time increased, making 76 appearances and scoring 11 goals. His performances caught the attention of several prominent European clubs such as English sides Sheffield Wednesday, Chelsea and Tottenham Hotspur, and Spanish club Barcelona.

Gakpé signed for Ligue 2 club FC Nantes on 28 January 2011. At the end of January 2012, it was announced that Gakpé had signed for Belgian club Standard Liège on a season-long loan. On 30 August 2014, he scored the only goal in the match, converting a penalty, against Montpellier HSC.

== International career ==
Even though Gakpé holds French nationality and represented France at youth level, he chose to play for the Togo national team, and was called up for the 2010 FIFA World Cup qualification match against Morocco on 6 September 2009.

In 2013 he played in all matches at 2013 Africa Cup of Nations when his team reached the quarter-finals.

=== International goals ===
Scores and results list Togo's goal tally first, score column indicates score after each Gakpé goal.

List of international goals scored by Serge Gakpé
No.	Date	Venue	Opponent	Score	Result	Competition
1	4 September 2010	Botswana National Stadium, Gaborone, Botswana	Botswana	1–1	1–2	2012 Africa Cup of Nations qualification
2	11 November 2011	Estádio Lino Correia, Bissau, Guinea-Bissau	Guinea-Bissau	1–0	1–1	2014 FIFA World Cup qualification
3	17 June 2012	Stade de Kégué, Lomé, Togo	Kenya	1–0	1–0	2013 Africa Cup of Nations qualification
4	30 January 2013	Mbombela Stadium, Nelspruit, South Africa	Tunisia	1–0	1–1	2013 Africa Cup of Nations
