= 2005–06 AS Monaco FC season =

AS Monaco
2005–06 season
- President: Michel Pastor
- Head coach: Didier Deschamps (until 19 September 2005); Jean Petit (caretaker); Francesco Guidolin (from October 2005)
- Stadium: Stade Louis II
- Ligue 1: 10th
- Coupe de la Ligue: Semi-final (vs. Nice)
- Coupe de France: Round of 32 (vs. Colmar)
- Champions League: Third qualifying round (vs. Real Betis)
- UEFA Cup: Round of 32 (vs. Basel)
- Top goalscorer: League: Javier Chevantón (10); All: Javier Chevantón (11)
Home colours

The 2005–06 season was AS Monaco FC's 49th season in Ligue 1. They finished tenth in Ligue 1, and were knocked out of the Coupe de la Ligue by Nice, in the semifinals, and the Coupe de France by Colmar at the Last 32. Monaco started the season under the management of Didier Deschamps, but after a poor start and disagreement with the club's President, Michel Pastor, Deschamps resigned from the club on 19 September 2005. Jean Petit was appointed as coach follow Deschamps' departure with Francesco Guidolin taking over from him in October.

== Squad ==
Note: Flags indicate national team as defined under FIFA eligibility rules; some limited exceptions apply. Players may hold more than one non-FIFA nationality.

No.	Pos.	Nation	Player
1	GK	FRA	Guillaume Warmuz
3	DF	FRA	Manuel Dos Santos
4	DF	FRA	François Modesto
5	MF	URU	Diego Pérez
6	MF	CZE	Jaroslav Plašil
7	MF	ARG	Lucas Bernardi
8	MF	ESP	Gerard
9	FW	URU	Javier Chevantón
10	FW	FRA	Alexandre Licata
11	MF	FRA	Olivier Sorlin
13	DF	BRA	Maicon
15	MF	GRE	Akis Zikos
16	GK	FRA	André Biancarelli
17	MF	FRA	Olivier Kapo (on loan from Juventus)

No.	Pos.	Nation	Player
18	DF	FRA	Eric Cubilier
19	DF	FRA	Sébastien Squillaci
20	DF	FRA	Arnaud Lescure
21	MF	FRA	Camel Meriem
22	FW	FRA	David Gigliotti
23	FW	ITA	Marco Di Vaio
26	FW	FRA	Frédéric Nimani
28	FW	FRA	Nicolas Maurice-Belay
29	MF	FRA	Malaury Martin
30	GK	ITA	Flavio Roma
31	DF	FRA	Olivier Veigneau
32	DF	FRA	Gaël Givet (captain)
33	FW	FRA	Alexis Allart
34	MF	FRA	Serge Gakpe
36	FW	ITA	Christian Vieri

=== Out on loan ===
Note: Flags indicate national team as defined under FIFA eligibility rules; some limited exceptions apply. Players may hold more than one non-FIFA nationality.

No.	Pos.	Nation	Player
—	GK	FRA	Stéphane Ruffier (at (France) Aviron Bayonnais)
—	MF	FRA	Jimmy Juan (at (England) Ipswich Town)
—	MF	FRA	Marko Muslin (at (Netherlands) Willem II)

No.	Pos.	Nation	Player
—	MF	SLE	Mohamed Kallon (at (Saudi Arabia) Ittihad)
—	FW	FRA	Toifilou Maoulida (at (France) Marseille)

== Transfers ==
=== Summer ===
In: Note: Flags indicate national team as defined under FIFA eligibility rules; some limited exceptions apply. Players may hold more than one non-FIFA nationality.

No.	Pos.	Nation	Player
1	GK	FRA	Guillaume Warmuz (from (Germany) Borussia Dortmund)
8	MF	ESP	Gerard (from (Spain) Barcelona)
11	MF	FRA	Olivier Sorlin (from (France) Rennes)
14	FW	FRA	Toifilou Maoulida (from (France) Rennes)
17	MF	FRA	Olivier Kapo (loan from (Italy) Juventus)
18	DF	FRA	Éric Cubilier (loan return from (France) Lens)
21	MF	FRA	Camel Meriem (from (France) Bordeaux)

Out: Note: Flags indicate national team as defined under FIFA eligibility rules; some limited exceptions apply. Players may hold more than one non-FIFA nationality.

No.	Pos.	Nation	Player
8	FW	SLE	Mohamed Kallon (loan to (Saudi Arabia) Ittihad)
12	DF	ITA	Joseph Dayo Oshadogan (to (Italy) Ternana)
18	FW	COD	Shabani Nonda (to (Italy) Roma)
21	MF	SWE	Pontus Farnerud (to (France) Strasbourg)
25	FW	SEN	Souleymane Camara (to (France) Nice)
27	DF	FRA	Julien Rodriguez (to (Scotland) Rangers)
35	DF	NOR	Hassan El Fakiri (to (Germany) Borussia Mönchengladbach)
—	GK	FRA	Stéphane Ruffier (loan to (France) Aviron Bayonnais)

=== Winter ===
In: Note: Flags indicate national team as defined under FIFA eligibility rules; some limited exceptions apply. Players may hold more than one non-FIFA nationality.

No.	Pos.	Nation	Player
3	DF	FRA	Manuel dos Santos (from (Portugal) Benfica)
10	FW	FRA	Alexandre Licata (from (France) Louhans-Cuiseaux)
23	FW	ITA	Marco Di Vaio (from (Spain) Valencia)
36	FW	ITA	Christian Vieri (from (Italy) A.C. Milan)

Out: Note: Flags indicate national team as defined under FIFA eligibility rules; some limited exceptions apply. Players may hold more than one non-FIFA nationality.

No.	Pos.	Nation	Player
3	DF	FRA	Patrice Evra (to (England) Manchester United)
14	FW	FRA	Toifilou Maoulida (loan to (France) Marseille)
24	FW	TOG	Emmanuel Adebayor (to (England) Arsenal)
26	MF	FRA	Marko Muslin (loan to (Netherlands) Willem II)

== Competitions ==
=== Ligue 1 ===
==== League table ====
Pos	Team	Pld	W	D	L	GF	GA	GD	Pts	Qualification or relegation
8	Nice	38	16	10	12	36	31	+5	58	
9	Paris Saint-Germain	38	13	13	12	44	38	+6	52	Qualification to UEFA Cup first round (Note: Paris Saint-Germain was qualified for the 2006–07 UEFA Cup as winners of the 2005–06 Coupe de France.)
10	Monaco	38	13	13	12	42	36	+6	52	
11	Le Mans	38	13	13	12	33	36	−3	52	
12	Nancy	38	12	12	14	35	37	−2	48	Qualification to UEFA Cup first round (Note: Nancy was qualified for the 2006–07 UEFA Cup as winners of the 2005–06 Coupe de la Ligue.)

Source: Ligue 1
Rules for classification: 1) points; 2) goal difference; 3) number of goals scored.

==== Results summary ====
Overall								Home						Away					
Pld	W	D	L	GF	GA	GD	Pts	W	D	L	GF	GA	GD	W	D	L	GF	GA	GD
38	13	13	12	42	36	+6	52	8	7	4	23	14	+9	5	6	8	19	22	−3

Last updated: 31 March 2015.
Source: Soccerway

==== Results by round ====
Round	1	2	3	4	5	6	7	8	9	10	11	12	13	14	15	16	17	18	19	20	21	22	23	24	25	26	27	28	29	30	31	32	33	34	35	36	37	38
Ground	A	H	A	A	H	A	H	A	H	A	H	A	H	A	H	A	H	A	H	A	H	H	A	H	A	H	A	H	A	H	A	H	A	H	A	H	A	H
Result	W	L	W	L	D	L	L	W	D	W	W	L	W	D	W	L	W	D	W	L	D	L	D	W	W	D	L	L	L	W	L	D	D	W	D	D	D	D
Position	5	9	7	10	10	12	15	12	13	11	6	8	7	8	6	8	5	6	5	8	8	9	9	9	8	9	11	12	13	11	12	12	12	11	11	11	11	10

Source: Ligue 1
A = Away; H = Home; W = Win; D = Draw; L = Loss

==== Results ====
30 July 2005 1	Nancy	0–1	AS Monaco	Tomblaine
20:00 CEST UTC+2	Keita (yellow card) 21'; Kroupi (yellow card) 56' (yellow-red card) 76'; Duchemin (yellow card) 70'; Chrétien (red card) 89'	Report	Maicon (yellow card) 24'; Kapo 69'; Evra (yellow card) 69'; Meriem (yellow card) 77'	Stadium: Stade Marcel Picot; Attendance: 19,188; Referee: Philippe Kalt

6 August 2005 2	AS Monaco	0–2	Auxerre	Fontvieille
20:00 CEST UTC+2	Evra (red card) 41'; Givet (yellow card) 90+1'	Report	Cheyrou (yellow card) 8'; Violeau 25'; Pieroni 78'; Bolf (yellow card) 81'	Stadium: Stade Louis II; Attendance: 15,748; Referee: Olivier Thual

14 August 2005 3	Strasbourg	1–2	AS Monaco	Strasbourg
18:00 CEST UTC+2	Devaux (yellow card) 35'; Boka (yellow card) 85'; Le Pen 90'	Report	Bernardi (yellow card) 34'; Squillaci 48'; Maoulida (yellow card) 62'; Maicon (yellow card) 72'; Chevantón 79'	Stadium: Stade de la Meinau; Attendance: 22,891; Referee: Éric Poulat

20 August 2005 4	Bordeaux	1–0	AS Monaco	Bordeaux
17:15 CEST UTC+2	Cheyrou (yellow card) 17', (goal) 58'; Darcheville (yellow card) 47'	Report	Zikos (yellow card) 36'; Squillaci (yellow card) 45'; Gerard (yellow card) 49'; Evra (yellow card) 56'; Kapo (yellow card) 70'	Stadium: Stade Chaban-Delmas; Attendance: 30,663; Referee: Alain Hamer

28 August 2005 5	AS Monaco	0–0	Lens	Fontvieille
18:00 CEST UTC+2		Report	Keita (yellow card) 82'	Stadium: Stade Louis II; Attendance: 11,910; Referee: Laurent Duhamel

10 September 2005 6	Lyon	2–1	AS Monaco	Lyon
17:15 CEST UTC+2	Fred 5', 49'; Berthod (yellow card) 25'	Report	Kapo (yellow card) 34' (yellow-red card) 55'; Gigliotti (yellow card) 42', (goal) 79'; Maicon (yellow card) 90'	Stadium: Stade de Gerland; Attendance: 39,043; Referee: Hervé Piccirillo

18 September 2005 7	AS Monaco	0–2	Rennes	Fontvieille
18:00 CEST UTC+2	Zikos (yellow card) 54' (yellow-red card) 54'; Squillaci (red card) 66'; Bernardi (yellow card) 69'; Maoulida (yellow card) 77'	Report	Jeunechamp (yellow card) 26'; Perrier-Doumbé (yellow card) 30'; Källström 35'; Edman (yellow card) 55'; Gourcuff 59'	Stadium: Stade Louis II; Attendance: 8,171; Referee: Damien Ledentu

21 September 2005 8	Troyes	1–2	AS Monaco	Troyes
20:30 CEST UTC+2	Faye (yellow card) 26'; Grax 33', (yellow card) 82'; Jaziri (yellow card) 45'	Report	Cubilier (yellow card) 20' (yellow-red card) 54'; Bernardi (yellow card) 31'; Adebayor 57'; Gerard (yellow card) 64' (yellow-red card) 68'; Givet 77'	Stadium: Stade de l'Aube; Attendance: 12,214; Referee: Stéphane Moulin

24 September 2005 9	AS Monaco	0–0	OGC Nice	Fontvieille
17:15 CEST UTC+2	Zikos (yellow card) 62'; Evra (yellow card) 70'; Givet (yellow card) 86'	Report	Fanni (yellow card) 39'; Koné (yellow card) 45'; Traoré (yellow card) 72'	Stadium: Stade Louis II; Attendance: 14,193; Referee: Jean-Paul Chaudre

2 October 2005 10	Lille	0–1	AS Monaco	Villeneuve-d'Ascq
18:00 CEST UTC+2	Fauvergue (yellow card) 28'	Report	Cubilier (yellow card) 30'; Maoulida (yellow card) 55'; Kapo 60'	Stadium: Stade Pierre-Mauroy; Attendance: 12,738; Referee: Pascal Garibian

15 October 2005 11	AS Monaco	3–0	Metz	Fontvieille
20:00 CEST UTC+2	Zikos (yellow card) 59', (goal) 64'; Gigliotti 61'; Meriem 72'	Report	Djiba (yellow card) 55'; Tum (yellow card) 57'	Stadium: Stade Louis II; Attendance: 8,128; Referee: Bruno Ruffray

23 October 2005 12	Sochaux	2–1	AS Monaco	Montbéliard
18:00 CEST UTC+2	Ilan 9'; Miranda (yellow card) 26'; Dagano 40'; N'Daw (yellow card) 45'; Brunel (yellow card) 76'	Report	Bernardi (yellow card) 39'; Gigliotti (yellow card) 63'; Plašil (yellow card) 74'; Givet (yellow card) 88'; Modesto (yellow card) 89'; Maicon 90+2'	Stadium: Stade Auguste Bonal; Attendance: 15,028; Referee: Stéphane Lannoy

29 October 2005 13	AS Monaco	3–0	Ajaccio	Fontvieille
20:00 CEST UTC+2	Chevantón 38', (yellow card) 45'; Zikos (yellow card) 57'; Givet 69'; Plašil 76'; Maicon (yellow card) 78'	Report	Džodić (yellow card) 41'; Robin (yellow card) 80'	Stadium: Stade Louis II; Attendance: 8,631; Referee: Thierry Auriac

6 November 2005 14	Paris Saint-Germain	0–0	AS Monaco	Paris
20:45 CET UTC+1	Letizi (yellow card) 75'	Report	Zikos (yellow card) 45'	Stadium: Parc des Princes; Attendance: 43,555; Referee: Jean-Paul Chaudre

19 November 2005 15	AS Monaco	1–0	Saint-Étienne	Fontvieille
17:15 CET UTC+1	Modesto (yellow card) 36'; Meriem 54'; Warmuz (yellow card) 84'; Sorlin (yellow card) 85'	Report	Ilunga (yellow card) 23'; Hellebuyck (yellow card) 45'	Stadium: Stade Louis II; Attendance: 16,234; Referee: Philippe Kalt

27 November 2005 16	Marseille	2–1	AS Monaco	Marseille
20:45 CET UTC+1	Oruma 64'; Lamouchi 76'; Mendoza (yellow card) 82'	Report	Meriem 19', (yellow card) 52'; Cubilier (yellow card) 63'; Adebayor (red card) 90'	Stadium: Stade Vélodrome; Attendance: 47,846; Referee: Pascal Garibian

3 December 2005 17	AS Monaco	2–0	Le Mans	Fontvieille
20:00 CET UTC+1	Modesto 11'; Sorlin 42'; Gigliotti (yellow card) 82'	Report	Bonnart (yellow card) 40'	Stadium: Stade Louis II; Attendance: 7,385; Referee: Stéphane Lannoy

11 December 2005 18	Nantes	0–0	AS Monaco	Nantes
18:00 CET UTC+1	Bamogo (yellow card) 29'	Report	Zikos (yellow card) 34'; Evra (yellow card) 66'	Stadium: Stade de la Beaujoire; Attendance: 28,275; Referee: Tony Chapron

18 December 2005 19	AS Monaco	1–0	Toulouse	Fontvieille
18:00 CET UTC+1	Kapo 85' (pen.)	Report	Mansaré (yellow card) 29'; Aubey (yellow card) 86'; Emaná (yellow card) 86'	Stadium: Stade Louis II; Attendance: 9,108; Referee: Patrick Lhermite

5 January 2006 20	Auxerre	2–1	AS Monaco	Auxerre
20:45 CET UTC+1	Luyindula 34'; Kahlenberg 57'; Grichting (yellow card) 60'	Report	Di Vaio 30'; Veigneau (yellow card) 49'; Givet (yellow card) 58'	Stadium: Stade de l'Abbé-Deschamps; Attendance: 7,972; Referee: Hervé Piccirillo

11 January 2006 21	AS Monaco	1–1	Strasbourg	Fontvieille
20:30 CET UTC+1	Givet (yellow card) 39'; Bernardi (yellow card) 43'; Kapo 72'; Zikos (yellow card) 78'	Report	Loué (yellow card) 40'; Kanté 74', (yellow card) 76'; Deroff (yellow card) 87'	Stadium: Stade Louis II; Attendance: 8,177; Referee: Fredy Fautrel

14 January 2006 22	AS Monaco	0–1	Bordeaux	Fontvieille
20:00 CET UTC+1	Pérez (yellow card) 59'; Modesto (yellow card) 77'	Report	Cheyrou (yellow card) 1'; Henrique (yellow card) 17'; Denílson 70'	Stadium: Stade Louis II; Attendance: 11,496; Referee: Stéphane Bré

22 January 2006 23	Lens	1–1	AS Monaco	Lens
18:00 CET UTC+1	Gillet 45', (yellow card) 60'	Report	Gakpe 7'; Pérez (yellow card) 37'; Maicon (yellow card) 78'; Kapo (yellow card) 85'	Stadium: Stade Bollaert-Delelis; Attendance: 35,796; Referee: Jean-Paul Chaudre

29 January 2006 24	AS Monaco	Postponed	Lyon	Fontvieille
CET UTC+1		[ Report]		Stadium: Stade Louis II

4 February 2006 25	Rennes	1–3	AS Monaco	Rennes
20:00 CET UTC+1	Mvuemba 25'; Adaílton (yellow card) 85'	Report	Zikos (yellow card) 40'; Vieri 57', 68'; Maicon (yellow card) 89'; Veigneau 90+1'	Stadium: Stade de la Route de Lorient; Attendance: 25,955; Referee: Saïd Ennjimi

11 February 2006 26	AS Monaco	1–1	Troyes	Fontvieille
20:00 CET UTC+1	Vieri 15'; Bernardi (red card) 74'	Report	Tourenne (yellow card) 35'; Matuidi (yellow card) 53'; Yamissi 64'; Grax (yellow card) 87'	Stadium: Stade Louis II; Attendance: 8,635; Referee: Pascal Garibian

18 February 2006 27	Nice	2–0	AS Monaco	Nice
17:15 CET UTC+1	Bellion 8' (pen.), (yellow card) 33'; Koné (yellow card) 77'	Report	Modesto (yellow card) 22'; Cubilier (yellow card) 50'; Zikos (yellow card) 78' dos Santos (yellow card) 82'; Vieri (yellow card) 90'	Stadium: Stade du Ray; Attendance: 11,366; Referee: Éric Poulat

26 February 2006 28	AS Monaco	0–1	Lille	Fontvieille
18:00 CEST UTC+2	Di Vaio (yellow card) 27'	Report	Tavlaridis (yellow card) 34'; Keïta (yellow card) 40'; Makoun (red card) 51'; Odemwingie 58'; Debuchy (yellow card) 88'	Stadium: Stade Louis II; Attendance: 8,808; Referee: Philippe Malige

4 March 2006 29	Metz	2–1	AS Monaco	Metz
20:00 CEST UTC+2	Plašil 72' (o.g.); Tum 81'	Report	Lescure (yellow card) 14'; Di Vaio (yellow card) 31', (goal) 37'	Stadium: Stade Saint-Symphorien; Attendance: 16,757; Referee: Patrick Lhermite

11 March 2006 30	AS Monaco	4–1	Sochaux	Fontvieille
20:00 CEST UTC+2	Chevantón 9'; Di Vaio 18', 62'; Bernardi (yellow card) 33'; Kapo 46'	Report	Ilan 68' (pen.); Weldon (yellow card) 84'; Diawara (yellow card) 90'	Stadium: Stade Louis II; Attendance: 9,480; Referee: Jean-Charles Cailleux

18 March 2006 31	AC Ajaccio	1–0	AS Monaco	Ajaccio
20:00 CEST UTC+2	N'Diaye 12'; Carlos (yellow card) 43'; Saïfi (yellow card) 56'	Report	Pérez (yellow card) 70'	Stadium: Stade François Coty; Attendance: 3,292; Referee: Laurent Duhamel

26 March 2006 32	AS Monaco	1–1	Paris Saint-Germain	Fontvieille
20:45 CEST UTC+2	Chevantón 52', (yellow card) 53'; Pérez (yellow card) 54'	Report	M'bami (yellow card) 14'; César 15'; Kalou (yellow card) 54'	Stadium: Stade Louis II; Attendance: 11,668; Referee: Thierry Auriac

1 April 2006 33	Saint-Étienne	1–1	AS Monaco	Saint-Étienne
20:00 CEST UTC+2	Hognon (yellow card) 38'; Camara (yellow card) 61'; Gomis 84'	Report	Chevantón 56'; Di Vaio (yellow card) 60'; Pérez (yellow card) 64'; Roma (yellow card) 71'	Stadium: Stade Geoffroy-Guichard; Attendance: 33,683; Referee: Bruno Ruffray

8 April 2006 34	AS Monaco	1–0	Marseille	Fontvieille
20:00 CEST UTC+2	Pérez (yellow card) 13'; Chevantón 27'; Maicon (yellow card) 79'	Report	Pagis (yellow card) 40'; Civelli (yellow card) 79'	Stadium: Stade Louis II; Attendance: 17,596; Referee: Stéphane Lannoy

15 April 2006 35	Le Mans	0–0	AS Monaco	Le Mans
20:00 CEST UTC+2	Thomas (yellow card) 34'; Cerdan (yellow card) 84'	Report	Maicon (yellow card) 26'; Gakpe (yellow card) 77'	Stadium: Stade Léon-Bollée; Attendance: 13,212; Referee: Philippe Malige

23 April 2006 24	AS Monaco	2–1	Lyon	Fontvieille
20:45 CET UTC+1	Chevantón 32'; Bernardi (yellow card) 30'; Di Vaio 57'	Report	Tiago (yellow card) 54'; Carew 90'	Stadium: Stade Louis II; Attendance: 16,053; Referee: Pascal Garibian

30 April 2006 36	AS Monaco	1–1	Nantes	Fontvieille
16:30 CEST UTC+2	Bernardi (yellow card) 40'; Maicon (yellow card) 51'; Chevantón 89'; Plašil (yellow card) 90'	Report	Capoue (yellow card) 11', (goal) 28'; Da Rocha (yellow card) 90'	Stadium: Stade Louis II; Attendance: 11,061; Referee: Bertrand Layec

6 May 2006 37	Toulouse	3–3	AS Monaco	Toulouse
20:00 CEST UTC+2	Santos 31'; Dieuze (yellow card) 71', (goal) 88'; Moreira 82'	Report	Gakpe 38' dos Santos 40'; Chevantón 56', (yellow card) 87'; Plašil (yellow card) 89'	Stadium: Stadium Municipal; Attendance: 20,176; Referee: Hervé Piccirillo

13 May 2006 38	AS Monaco	2–2	Nancy	Fontvieille
20:00 CEST UTC+2	Pérez (yellow card) 56'; Chevantón 63'; Modesto 66'	Report	Givet 6' (o.g.); Lécluse (yellow card) 31'; Diakhaté (yellow card) 35'; Duchemin (yellow card) 42'; Luiz 78'	Stadium: Stade Louis II; Attendance: 9,990; Referee: Stéphane Moulin

=== Coupe de la Ligue ===
26 October 2005 Second round	AS Monaco	1–0	Dijon	Fontvieille
20:00 CET UTC+1	Gerard 33'	Report		Stadium: Stade Louis II; Attendance: 9,397; Referee: Pascal Viléo

21 December 2005 Third round	AS Monaco	1–0	Lille	Fontvieille
20:00 CET UTC+1	Chevantón (yellow card) 34'; Zikos (yellow card) 70'; Meriem 82'	Report	Debuchy (yellow card) 79'	Stadium: Stade Louis II; Attendance: 11,457; Referee: Bertrand Layec

18 January 2006 Quarterfinal	Toulouse	0–2	AS Monaco	Toulouse
21:00 CET UTC+1		Report	Maicon (yellow card) 59'; Plašil 66'; Bernardi (yellow card) 74'; Vieri 90+3'	Stadium: Stadium Municipal; Attendance: 15,712; Referee: Éric Poulat

7 February 2006 Semi-final	AS Monaco	0–1	Nice	Fontvieille
21:00 CET UTC+1	Bernardi (yellow card) 16'; Vieri (yellow card) 64'; Zikos (yellow card) 89'; Chevantón (yellow card) 90+1'	Report	Bagayoko (yellow card) 33'; Rool (yellow card) 64'; Ederson 88'	Stadium: Stade Louis II; Attendance: 17,341; Referee: Laurent Duhamel

=== Coupe de France ===
8 January 2006 Round of 64	Rhone Valleys	0–6	AS Monaco	Valence
CET UTC+1		[ Report]	Gigliotti 9', 35', 38', 49'; Gakpé 20', 42'	Stadium: Stade Georges Pompidou

12 February 2005 Round of 32	Colmar	1–0 (a.e.t.)	AS Monaco	Colmar
CET UTC+1	Bader 114'	[ Report]		Stadium: Colmar Stadium

=== UEFA Champions League ===
==== Qualifying rounds ====
===== Third qualifying round =====
9 August 2005 First leg	Real Betis (Spain)	1–0	(France) AS Monaco	Seville, Spain
22:00 CET UTC+1	Fernández (yellow card) 28'; Rivera (yellow card) 30'; Edu 90+3'	Report	Modesto (yellow card) 23'; Evra (yellow card) 44'; Sorlin (yellow card) 71'	Stadium: Estadio Manuel Ruiz de Lopera; Attendance: 30,000; Referee: Graham Poll (England)

23 August 2005 Second leg	AS Monaco (France)	2–2 (2–3 agg.)	(Spain) Real Betis	Fontvieille, Monaco
20:45 CET UTC+1	Gerard 33'; Bernardi (yellow card) 38'; Maoulida 63'; Squillaci (yellow card) 83'	Report	Oliveira 17', 75'; Xisco (yellow card) 36'; Joaquín (yellow card) 37'; Rivera (yellow card) 53'; Doblas (yellow card) 79'	Stadium: Stade Louis II; Attendance: 21,000; Referee: Ľuboš Micheľ (Slovakia)

=== UEFA Cup ===
==== First round ====
15 September 2005 First leg	AS Monaco (France)	2–0	(Netherlands) Willem II	Fontvieille, Monaco
21:00 CEST UTC+2	Kapo 24'; Adebayor 47'	Report		Stadium: Stade Louis II; Referee: Alexandru Tudor (Romania)

29 September 2005 Second leg	Willem II (Netherlands)	1–3 (1–5 agg.)	(France) AS Monaco	Tilburg, Netherlands
18:00 CEST UTC+2	van der Haar (yellow card) 16'; Reuser (yellow card) 33'; Smit (yellow card) 61'; Hadouir 84'	Report	Maicon 47'; Adebayor 54'; Chevantón 89'	Stadium: Koning Willem II Stadion; Referee: Eduardo Iturralde González (Spain)

==== Group stage ====
Pos	Team	Pld	W	D	L	GF	GA	GD	Pts	Qualification	MON	HSV	SLA	VIK	CSS
1	(France) Monaco	4	3	0	1	6	2	+4	9	Advance to knockout stage	—	2–0	—	—	2–1
2	(Germany) Hamburger SV	4	3	0	1	5	2	+3	9	Advance to knockout stage	—	—	2–0	2–0	—
3	(Czech Republic) Slavia Prague	4	1	1	2	6	8	−2	4	Advance to knockout stage	0–2	—	—	—	4–2
4	(Norway) Viking	4	1	1	2	3	6	−3	4		1–0	—	2–2	—	—
5	(Bulgaria) CSKA Sofia	4	1	0	3	5	7	−2	3		—	0–1	—	2–0	—

20 October 2005 1	Viking (Norway)	1–0	(France) AS Monaco	Stavanger, Norway
18:00 CEST UTC+2	Nhleko 18'; Grande (yellow card) 31'	Report		Stadium: Viking Stadion; Referee: Gerald Lehner (Austria)

24 November 2005 2	AS Monaco (France)	2–0	(Germany) Hamburger SV	Fontvieille, Monaco
21:00 CEST UTC+2	Adebayor 44'; Meriem 47'; Bernardi (yellow card) 62'	Report	Van Buyten (yellow card) 37'; Ziegler (yellow card) 60'; Boulahrouz (red card) 90+2'	Stadium: Stade Louis II; Referee: Roberto Rosetti (Italy)

30 November 2005 3	Slavia Prague (Czech Republic)	0–2	(France) AS Monaco	Prague, Czech Republic
CEST UTC+2	Suchý (yellow card) 57'	Report	Maoulida 12', 72'; Sorlin (yellow card) 31'; Evra (yellow card) 50'	Stadium: Eden Arena; Referee: Sorin Corpodean (Romania)

15 December 2005 4	AS Monaco (France)	2–1	(Bulgaria) CSKA Sofia	Fontvieille, Monaco
CET UTC+1	Kapo 49'; Squillaci 74'; Zikos (yellow card) 90+1'	Report	Dimitrov 83'; Gargorov (yellow card) 89'	Stadium: Stade Louis II; Referee: Dougie McDonald (Scotland)

==== Knockout stage ====
===== Round of 32 =====
15 February 2006 First leg	Basel (Switzerland)	1–0	(France) AS Monaco	Basel, Switzerland
18:00 CET UTC+1	Degen 78'	Report		Stadium: St. Jakob-Park; Referee: Pieter Vink (Netherlands)

23 February 2006 Second leg	AS Monaco (France)	1–1 (1 – 2 agg.)	(Switzerland) Basel	Fontvieille, Monaco
20:45 CET UTC+1	Bernardi (yellow card) 9'; Vieri 21' (pen.); Chevantón (yellow card) 76'	Report	Majstorović 56', (yellow card) 56'; Zanni (yellow card) 71'	Stadium: Stade Louis II; Referee: Costas Kapitanis (Cyprus)

== Statistics ==
As of match played 13 May 2006

=== Appearances and goals ===
No.	Pos	Nat	Player	Total		Ligue 1		Coupe de France		Coupe de la Ligue		Europe	
No.	Pos	Nat	Player	Apps	Goals	Apps	Goals	Apps	Goals	Apps	Goals	Apps	Goals
1	GK	(France) FRA	Guillaume Warmuz	35	0	23	0	0	0	4	0	8	0
3	DF	(France) FRA	Manuel dos Santos	18	1	14+1	1	0	0	1	0	2	0
4	DF	(France) FRA	François Modesto	39	2	21+7	2	0	0	2	0	8+1	0
5	MF	(Uruguay) URU	Diego Pérez	26	0	15+7	0	0	0	1	0	3	0
6	MF	(Czech Republic) CZE	Jaroslav Plašil	31	2	17+4	1	0	0	3+1	1	6	0
7	MF	(Argentina) ARG	Lucas Bernardi	45	0	29+3	0	0	0	1+2	0	9+1	0
8	MF	(Spain) ESP	Gerard	9	2	6+1	0	0	0	1	1	1	1
9	FW	(Uruguay) URU	Javier Chevantón	28	11	18+5	10	0	0	1+1	0	1+2	1
11	MF	(France) FRA	Olivier Sorlin	28	1	18+2	1	0	0	1+1	0	5+1	0
13	DF	(Brazil) BRA	Maicon	38	2	28	1	0	0	2+1	0	7	1
15	MF	(Greece) GRE	Akis Zikos	29	1	15+2	1	0	0	3	0	7+2	0
16	GK	(France) FRA	André Biancarelli	1	0	0+1	0	0	0	0	0	0	0
17	MF	(France) FRA	Olivier Kapo	32	7	20+5	5	0	0	1	0	5+1	2
18	DF	(France) FRA	Eric Cubilier	19	0	10+3	0	0	0	1+1	0	3+1	0
19	DF	(France) FRA	Sébastien Squillaci	37	2	26+1	1	0	0	2	0	8	1
20	DF	(France) FRA	Arnaud Lescure	2	0	1+1	0	0	0	0	0	0	0
21	MF	(France) FRA	Camel Meriem	42	5	25+5	3	0	0	3+1	1	8	1
22	FW	(France) FRA	David Gigliotti	21	2	4+10	2	0	0	1	0	0+6	0
23	FW	(Italy) ITA	Marco Di Vaio	17	5	15	5	0	0	2	0	0	0
28	FW	(France) FRA	Nicolas Maurice-Belay	20	0	6+7	0	0	0	2+1	0	1+3	0
29	MF	(France) FRA	Malaury Martin	1	0	1	0	0	0	0	0	0	0
30	GK	(Italy) ITA	Flavio Roma	17	0	15	0	0	0	0	0	2	0
31	DF	(France) FRA	Olivier Veigneau	26	1	11+9	1	0	0	2	0	1+3	0
32	DF	(France) FRA	Gaël Givet	42	2	32	2	0	0	4	0	5+1	0
34	MF	(France) FRA	Serge Gakpe	15	2	8+5	2	0	0	0	0	2	0
36	FW	(Italy) ITA	Christian Vieri	11	5	5+2	3	0	0	1+1	1	2	1
Players away from the club on loan:
14	FW	(France) FRA	Toifilou Maoulida	23	3	9+7	0	0	0	1	0	2+4	3
26	MF	(France) FRA	Marko Muslin	1	0	0+1	0	0	0	0	0	0	0
Players who appeared for Monaco no longer at the club:
3	DF	(France) FRA	Patrice Evra	23	0	15	0	0	0	1	0	7	0
24	FW	(Togo) TOG	Emmanuel Adebayor	21	4	11+2	1	0	0	1	0	7	3
25	FW	(Senegal) SEN	Souleymane Camara	2	0	0+2	0	0	0	0	0	0	0

=== Goal scorers ===
Place	Position	Nation	Number	Name	Ligue 1	Coupe de France	Coupe de la Ligue	Europe	Total
1	FW	(Uruguay)	9	Javier Chevantón	10		0	1	11
2	MF	(France)	17	Olivier Kapo	5		0	2	7
3	FW	(Italy)	23	Marco Di Vaio	5		0	0	5
3	FW	(Italy)	36	Christian Vieri	3		1	1	5
3	MF	(France)	21	Camel Meriem	3		1	1	5
6	FW	(Togo)	24	Emmanuel Adebayor	1		0	3	4
7	FW	(France)	14	Toifilou Maoulida	0		0	3	3
8	FW	(France)	22	David Gigliotti	2		0	0	2
8	DF	(France)	4	François Modesto	2		0	0	2
8	MF	(France)	34	Serge Gakpé	2		0	0	2
8	DF	(France)	32	Gaël Givet	2		0	0	2
8	MF	(Czech Republic)	6	Jaroslav Plašil	1		1	0	2
8	DF	(France)	19	Sébastien Squillaci	1		0	1	2
8	DF	(Brazil)	13	Maicon	1		0	1	2
8	MF	(Spain)	8	Gerard	0		1	1	2
16	MF	(Greece)	15	Akis Zikos	1		0	0	1
16	MF	(France)	11	Olivier Sorlin	1		0	0	1
16	DF	(France)	31	Olivier Veigneau	1		0	0	1
16	DF	(France)	3	Manuel dos Santos	1		0	0	1
				TOTALS	42	6	4	14	66

=== Disciplinary record ===
Number	Nation	Position	Name	Ligue 1		Coupe de France		Coupe de la Ligue		Europe		Total	
Number	Nation	Position	Name	Yellow card	Red card	Yellow card	Red card	Yellow card	Red card	Yellow card	Red card	Yellow card	Red card
1	(France)	GK	Guillaume Warmuz	1	0			0	0	0	0	1	0
3	(France)	DF	Patrice Evra	4	1			0	0	2	0	2	0
3	(France)	DF	Manuel dos Santos	1	0			0	0	0	0	1	0
4	(France)	DF	François Modesto	4	0			0	0	1	0	1	0
5	(Uruguay)	MF	Diego Pérez	7	0			0	0	0	0	1	0
6	(Czech Republic)	MF	Jaroslav Plašil	3	0			0	0	0	0	1	0
7	(Argentina)	MF	Lucas Bernardi	8	1			2	0	3	0	5	0
8	(Spain)	MF	Gerard	3	1			0	0	0	0	1	0
9	(Uruguay)	FW	Javier Chevantón	3	0			2	0	1	0	3	0
11	(France)	MF	Olivier Sorlin	1	0			0	0	2	0	2	0
13	(Brazil)	DF	Maicon	9	0			1	0	0	0	1	0
14	(France)	FW	Toifilou Maoulida	3	0			0	0	0	0	1	0
15	(Greece)	MF	Akis Zikos	11	1			2	0	1	0	3	0
17	(France)	MF	Olivier Kapo	4	1			0	0	0	0	1	0
18	(France)	DF	Éric Cubilier	5	1			0	0	0	0	1	0
19	(France)	DF	Sébastien Squillaci	1	1			0	0	1	0	1	0
20	(France)	DF	Arnaud Lescure	1	0			0	0	0	0	1	0
21	(France)	MF	Camel Meriem	2	0			0	0	0	0	1	0
22	(France)	MF	David Gigliotti	3	0			0	0	0	0	1	0
23	(Italy)	FW	Marco Di Vaio	3	0			0	0	0	0	1	0
24	(Togo)	FW	Emmanuel Adebayor	0	1			0	0	0	0	0	1
30	(Italy)	GK	Flavio Roma	1	0			0	0	0	0	1	0
31	(France)	DF	Olivier Veigneau	1	0			0	0	0	0	1	0
32	(France)	DF	Gaël Givet	5	0			0	0	0	0	1	0
34	(France)	MF	Serge Gakpé	1	0			0	0	0	0	1	0
36	(Italy)	FW	Christian Vieri	1	0			1	0	0	0	1	0
			TOTALS	86	8			8	0	11	0	105	8
