= 2006–07 AS Monaco FC season =

AS Monaco
2006–07 season
- President: Michel Pastor
- Head coach: László Bölöni (until October 2006); Laurent Banide (from October 2006)
- Stadium: Stade Louis II
- Ligue 1: 9th
- Coupe de la Ligue: Round of 16 (vs. Stade Reims)
- Coupe de France: Round of 16 (vs. Sochaux)
- Top goalscorer: League: Jan Koller (8); All: Jan Koller (8)
Home colours

The 2006–07 season was AS Monaco FC's 50th season in Ligue 1. They finished Ninth in Ligue 1, and were knocked out of the Coupe de la Ligue by Stade Reims, at the Round of 16, and the Coupe de France by Sochaux also at the Round of 16.

Monaco replaced coach Francesco Guidolin with László Bölöni at the start of the season, before firing Bölöni in October with the club sitting 19th in the league. Laurent Banide was appointed as the replacement for Bölöni.

== Squad ==
As of May 20, 2007 Note: Flags indicate national team as defined under FIFA eligibility rules; some limited exceptions apply. Players may hold more than one non-FIFA nationality.

No.	Pos.	Nation	Player
1	GK	FRA	Guillaume Warmuz
2	DF	FRA	Sylvain Monsoreau
3	DF	FRA	Manuel Dos Santos
4	DF	FRA	François Modesto
5	MF	URU	Diego Pérez
6	MF	CZE	Jaroslav Plašil
7	MF	ARG	Lucas Bernardi
8	MF	ESP	Gerard
9	FW	CZE	Jan Koller
10	FW	FRA	Jérémy Ménez
13	FW	COL	Juan Pablo Pino
14	MF	FRA	Malaury Martin
15	MF	CIV	Yaya Touré
16	GK	FRA	Stéphane Ruffier

No.	Pos.	Nation	Player
17	MF	FRA	Serge Gakpe
18	FW	SLE	Mohamed Kallon
19	FW	URU	Gonzalo Vargas
20	FW	FRA	Frédéric Piquionne (loan from Saint-Étienne)
21	MF	FRA	Camel Meriem
22	DF	BRA	Bolívar
23	MF	CRO	Jerko Leko
24	DF	COD	Cédric Mongongu
25	DF	ARG	Leandro Cufré
26	DF	SEN	Massamba Sambou
27	FW	FRA	Frédéric Nimani
28	MF	FRA	Djamel Bakar
30	GK	ITA	Flavio Roma
32	DF	FRA	Gaël Givet (captain)

=== Out on loan ===
Note: Flags indicate national team as defined under FIFA eligibility rules; some limited exceptions apply. Players may hold more than one non-FIFA nationality.

No.	Pos.	Nation	Player
11	FW	FRA	Sébastien Grax (at Sochaux)
13	FW	FRA	Alexandre Licata (at Gueugnon)
20	DF	FRA	Arnaud Lescure (at Toulon)
22	FW	FRA	David Gigliotti (at Troyes)

No.	Pos.	Nation	Player
28	MF	FRA	Nicolas Maurice-Belay (at Sedan)
29	DF	FRA	Thomas Mangani (at Stade Brest)
31	DF	FRA	Olivier Veigneau (at Nice)

== Transfers ==
=== Summer ===
In: Note: Flags indicate national team as defined under FIFA eligibility rules; some limited exceptions apply. Players may hold more than one non-FIFA nationality.

No.	Pos.	Nation	Player
2	DF	FRA	Sylvain Monsoreau (from (France) Lyon)
9	FW	CZE	Jan Koller (from (Germany) Borussia Dortmund)
10	FW	FRA	Jérémy Ménez (from (France) Sochaux)
15	MF	CIV	Yaya Touré (from (Greece) Olympiacos)
16	GK	FRA	Stéphane Ruffier (loan return from (France) Aviron Bayonnais)
18	FW	SLE	Mohamed Kallon (loan return from (Saudi Arabia) Ittihad)
19	FW	URU	Gonzalo Vargas (from (Argentina) Club de Gimnasia y Esgrima La Plata)
22	DF	BRA	Bolívar (from (Brazil) Internacional)
23	MF	CRO	Jerko Leko (from (Ukraine) Dynamo Kyiv)
25	DF	ARG	Leandro Cufré (from (Italy) Roma)

Out: Note: Flags indicate national team as defined under FIFA eligibility rules; some limited exceptions apply. Players may hold more than one non-FIFA nationality.

No.	Pos.	Nation	Player
9	FW	URU	Javier Chevantón (to (Spain) Sevilla)
11	MF	FRA	Olivier Sorlin (to (France) Rennes)
13	DF	BRA	Maicon (to (Italy) Internazionale)
15	MF	GRE	Akis Zikos (to (Greece) AEK Athens)
18	DF	FRA	Éric Cubilier (to (France) Nantes)
19	DF	FRA	Sébastien Squillaci (to (France) Lyon)
20	DF	FRA	Arnaud Lescure (loan to (France) Toulon)
22	FW	FRA	David Gigliotti (to (France) Troyes)
28	MF	FRA	Nicolas Maurice-Belay (loan to (France) Sedan)
31	DF	FRA	Olivier Veigneau (loan to (France) Nice)
33	FW	FRA	Alexis Allart (to (France) Louhans-Cuiseaux)
36	FW	ITA	Christian Vieri (to (Italy) Sampdoria)
—	MF	FRA	Jimmy Juan (to (France) Grenoble, previously on loan to (England) Ipswich Town)
—	MF	FRA	Marko Muslin (to (Belgium) Lierse, previously on loan to (Netherlands) Willem II)
—	FW	FRA	Toifilou Maoulida (to (France) Marseille, previously on loan)

=== Winter ===
In: Note: Flags indicate national team as defined under FIFA eligibility rules; some limited exceptions apply. Players may hold more than one non-FIFA nationality.

No.	Pos.	Nation	Player
13	MF	COL	Juan Pablo Pino (from (Colombia) Independiente Medellín)
20	FW	FRA	Frédéric Piquionne (loan from (France) Saint-Étienne)

Out: Note: Flags indicate national team as defined under FIFA eligibility rules; some limited exceptions apply. Players may hold more than one non-FIFA nationality.

No.	Pos.	Nation	Player
10	FW	FRA	Alexandre Licata (loan to (France) Gueugnon)
20	FW	ITA	Marco Di Vaio (to (Italy) Genoa)

== Competitions ==
=== Ligue 1 ===
==== League table ====
Pos	Team	Pld	W	D	L	GF	GA	GD	Pts	Qualification or relegation
7	Sochaux	38	15	12	11	46	48	−2	57	Qualification to UEFA Cup first round (Note: Bordeaux, the winner of the Coupe de la Ligue, is awarded entry to the 2007–08 UEFA Cup. The winners of the Coupe de France, Sochaux also have been awarded entry to the 2007–08 UEFA Cup.)
8	Auxerre	38	13	15	10	41	41	0	54	
9	Monaco	38	13	12	13	45	38	+7	51	
10	Lille	38	13	11	14	45	43	+2	50	
11	Saint-Étienne	38	14	7	17	52	50	+2	49	

Source: Ligue 1
Rules for classification: 1) points; 2) goal difference; 3) number of goals scored.

==== Results summary ====
Overall								Home						Away					
Pld	W	D	L	GF	GA	GD	Pts	W	D	L	GF	GA	GD	W	D	L	GF	GA	GD
38	13	12	13	45	38	+7	51	9	5	5	26	18	+8	4	7	8	19	20	−1

Last updated: 31 March 2015.
Source: Soccerway

==== Results by round ====
Round	1	2	3	4	5	6	7	8	9	10	11	12	13	14	15	16	17	18	19	20	21	22	23	24	25	26	27	28	29	30	31	32	33	34	35	36	37	38
Ground	A	H	A	H	A	H	A	H	A	H	A	H	A	H	A	H	A	H	A	A	H	A	H	A	H	A	H	A	H	A	H	A	H	A	H	A	H	H
Result	L	L	D	W	L	L	L	W	L	L	L	D	W	D	D	W	L	W	D	W	L	W	W	L	D	W	D	D	W	D	D	D	W	D	L	L	W	W
Position	16	19	18	13	14	17	19	16	18	19	20	20	17	16	16	16	16	14	15	15	15	14	13	14	14	13	14	14	12	13	13	13	11	11	13	14	13	9

Source: Ligue 1
A = Away; H = Home; W = Win; D = Draw; L = Loss

==== Results ====
5 August 2006 1	Nancy	1 – 0	AS Monaco	Tomblaine
20:00 CEST UTC+2	Luiz (yellow card) 19'; N'Guémo (yellow card) 19'; Curbelo (yellow card) 32'; Zerka 54'; Biancalani (yellow card) 84'	Report	Leko (yellow card) 11'; Gigliotti (yellow card) 26' (yellow-red card) 80'; Gakpé (yellow card) 27'	Stadium: Stade Marcel Picot; Attendance: 17,515; Referee: Fredy Fautrel

12 August 2006 2	AS Monaco	1 – 2	Saint-Étienne	Fontvieille
20:00 CEST UTC+2	Kallon (red card) 45+1'; Koller (yellow card) 51'; Bernardi (yellow card) 60'; Plašil (yellow card) 63'; Gerard 87' (pen.)	Report	Feindouno 12'; Landrin (yellow card) 51'; Piquionne 72'; Camara (yellow card) 84'	Stadium: Stade Louis II; Attendance: 17,324; Referee: Hervé Piccirillo

19 August 2006 3	Rennes	1 – 1	AS Monaco	Rennes
20:00 CEST UTC+2	Jeunechamp (yellow card) 40'; Briand 86'; Mbia (yellow card) 90+2'	Report	Koller 12'; Gakpé (yellow card) 13'; Bernardi (yellow card) 18'; Leko (yellow card) 44'; Sambou (yellow card) 52'; Plašil (yellow card) 88'	Stadium: Stade de la Route de Lorient; Attendance: 25,877; Referee: Bruno Ruffray

27 August 2006 4	AS Monaco	2 – 1	Sedan	Fontvieille
18:00 CEST UTC+2	Kallon 31'; Modesto 43'; Givet (yellow card) 54'; Gakpé (yellow card) 74'; Bernardi (yellow card) 80'; Leko (yellow card) 82'	Report	Boutabout 83'; Hénin (yellow card) 87'; Ouadah (yellow card) 90+2'	Stadium: Stade Louis II; Attendance: 9,603; Referee: Thierry Auriac

9 September 2006 5	AJ Auxerre	2 – 1	AS Monaco	Auxerre
20:00 CEST UTC+2	Cheyrou 28'; Jeleń 58'; Cool (yellow card) 90+3'; Mathis (yellow card) 90+4'	Report	Cufré (yellow card) 23'; Modesto (yellow card) 29'; Touré (yellow card) 31'; Nimani 61'	Stadium: Stade de l'Abbé-Deschamps; Attendance: 11,860; Referee: Philippe Kalt

17 September 2006 6	AS Monaco	1 – 2	Paris Saint-Germain	Fontvieille
18:00 CEST UTC+2	Modesto (yellow card) 10'; Kallon 33'; Bernardi (yellow card) 79'	Report	Rozehnal 42'; Hellebuyck 54'; Kalou (yellow card) 73'; Mendy (yellow card) 89'	Stadium: Stade Louis II; Attendance: 12,433; Referee: Stéphane Lannoy

24 September 2006 7	Lens	1 – 0	AS Monaco	Lens
18:30 CEST UTC+2	Jussiê 5' (pen.) (yellow card) 55'; Demont (yellow card) 29'; Jemâa (yellow card) 31'	Report	Pérez (yellow card) 31'; Leko (yellow card) 34'; Givet (yellow card) 59'	Stadium: Stade Bollaert-Delelis; Attendance: 31,828; Referee: Philippe Malige

30 September 2006 8	AS Monaco	2 – 1	Le Mans	Fontvieille
20:00 CEST UTC+2	Touré 10'; Ménez 81'	Report	Romaric 24' (pen.); Baša (yellow card) 43'	Stadium: Stade Louis II; Attendance: 9,895; Referee: Stéphane Bré

14 October 2006 9	Bordeaux	1 – 0	AS Monaco	Bordeaux
20:00 CEST UTC+2	Perea 70'	Report	Ménez (yellow card) 2'; Gerard (yellow card) 85'	Stadium: Stade Chaban-Delmas; Attendance: 23,135; Referee: Thierry Auriac

21 October 2006 10	AS Monaco	1 – 3	Toulouse	Fontvieille
20:00 CEST UTC+2	Di Vaio 14'; Cufré (yellow card) 40' (yellow-red card) 89'	Report	Bergougnoux 11' (yellow card) 58'; Mansaré (yellow card) 21'; Elmander 83'; Emaná 90+4'	Stadium: Stade Louis II; Attendance: 7,903; Referee: Fredy Fautrel

28 October 2006 11	Nantes	1 – 0	AS Monaco	Nantes
20:00 CEST UTC+2	Rossi 27'; Payet (yellow card) 30'; Cubilier (yellow card) 40'	Report	Plašil (yellow card) 14' (yellow-red card) 44'; Bernardi (yellow card) 20'; Cufré (yellow card) 52'	Stadium: Stade de la Beaujoire; Attendance: 30,745; Referee: Lionel Jaffredo

4 November 2006 12	AS Monaco	0 – 0	Nice	Fontvieille
20:00 CET UTC+1	Gakpé (yellow card) 40'	Report	Kanté (yellow card) 81'	Stadium: Stade Louis II; Attendance: 15,981; Referee: Tony Chapron

12 November 2006 13	Troyes	0 – 4	AS Monaco	Troyes
18:00 CET UTC+1	Faye (yellow card) 34'; Saganowski (yellow card) 75'	Report	Gakpé 21'; Pérez (yellow card) 23' (yellow-red card) 32'; Leko (yellow card) 63'; Meriem 73' (pen.); Roma (yellow card) 74'; Touré 85'; Di Vaio 90+2'	Stadium: Stade de l'Aube; Attendance: 11,436; Referee: Hervé Piccirillo

18 November 2006 14	AS Monaco	2 – 2	Lorient	Fontvieille
20:30 CET UTC+1	Touré 8'; Ménez 50'	Report	Namouchi 22'; Le Pen 50'	Stadium: Stade Louis II; Attendance: 9,820; Referee: Laurent Duhamel

25 November 2006 15	Lille	1 – 1	AS Monaco	Villeneuve d'Ascq
20:00 CET UTC+1	Bodmer 77'	Report	Gakpé 37'; Roma (yellow card) 45+2'; Givet (yellow card) 60'; Bernardi (yellow card) 85'	Stadium: Stade Pierre-Mauroy; Attendance: 13,193; Referee: Bertrand Layec

2 December 2006 16	AS Monaco	3 – 0	Valenciennes	Fontvieille
20:00 CET UTC+1	Touré 37'; Gakpé 46'; Koller 63'	Report	Flachez (yellow card) 75'; Traoré (yellow card) 82'	Stadium: Stade Louis II; Attendance: 12,277; Referee: Alexandre Castro

9 December 2006 17	Marseille	2 – 1	AS Monaco	Marseille
20:00 CET UTC+1	Pagis 37' (yellow card) 37'; Niang 77'; Cissé (yellow card) 90+3'	Report	Leko (yellow card) 28'; Di Vaio 58'; Bernardi (yellow card) 61' (yellow-red card) 90+1'	Stadium: Stade Vélodrome; Attendance: 47,708; Referee: Tony Chapron

16 December 2006 18	AS Monaco	3 – 0	Sochaux	Fontvieille
20:00 CET UTC+1	Leko 6'; Ménez 59'; Pérez (yellow card) 85'; Touré 88'	Report	Pichot (yellow card) 57'; Sène (yellow card) 81'	Stadium: Stade Louis II; Attendance: 11,292; Referee: Stéphane Lannoy

23 December 2006 19	Lyon	0 – 0	AS Monaco	Lyon
17:10 CET UTC+1	Tiago (yellow card) 45'; Toulalan (yellow card) 60'; Juninho (yellow card) 89'	Report	Leko (yellow card) 32'; Roma (yellow card) 70'; Pérez (yellow card) 71'; Cufré (yellow card) 87'	Stadium: Stade de Gerland; Attendance: 38,225; Referee: Thierry Auriac

14 January 2007 20	Saint-Étienne	0 – 1	AS Monaco	Saint-Étienne
18:00 CET UTC+1	Sablé (yellow card) 60'	Report	Ménez (yellow card) 37'; Leko (yellow card) 42'; Koller 66'	Stadium: Stade Geoffroy-Guichard; Attendance: 32,518; Referee: Damien Ledentu

24 January 2007 21	AS Monaco	0 – 2	Rennes	Fontvieille
20:30 CET UTC+1		Report	Briand 50' (yellow card) 78'; Didot 78'	Stadium: Stade Louis II; Attendance: 6,866; Referee: Laurent Duhamel

27 January 2007 22	Sedan	0 – 1	AS Monaco	Sedan
20:00 CET UTC+1	Jau (yellow card) 42'	Report	Koller 2'; Ménez (yellow card) 57'; Leko (yellow card) 82'; Gakpé (yellow card) 83'	Stadium: Stade Louis Dugauguez; Attendance: 10,851; Referee: Fredy Fautrel

3 February 2007 23	AS Monaco	2 – 1	AJ Auxerre	Fontvieille
20:00 CET UTC+1	Leko (yellow card) 34'; Gakpé 36'; Piquionne 63' (pen.); Cufré (yellow card) 64'	Report	Pedretti (yellow card) 23'; Cheyrou (yellow card) 30'; Akalé 90'	Stadium: Stade Louis II; Attendance: 8,102; Referee: Saïd Ennjimi

10 February 2007 24	Paris Saint-Germain	4 – 2	AS Monaco	Paris
17:10 CET UTC+1	Diané 5', 35'; Cissé (yellow card) 54'; Gallardo (yellow card) 79' (goal) 82'; Rodríguez 86'	Report	Piquionne 50' (yellow card) 64'; Ménez (yellow card) 61'; Koller 87'	Stadium: Parc des Princes; Attendance: 34,171; Referee: Olivier Thual

18 February 2007 25	AS Monaco	0 – 0	Lens	Fontvieille
18:00 CET UTC+1	Plašil (yellow card) 40'; Pérez (yellow card) 80'	Report	Coulibaly (yellow card) 45+1'; Dindane (yellow card) 71'	Stadium: Stade Louis II; Attendance: 10,666; Referee: Hervé Piccirillo

24 February 2007 26	Le Mans	0 – 2	AS Monaco	Le Mans
20:00 CET UTC+1		Report	Piquionne 15'; Pérez 47'; Leko (yellow card) 64'; Monsoreau (yellow card) 79'	Stadium: MMArena; Attendance: 10,388; Referee: Alexandre Castro

3 March 2007 27	AS Monaco	0 – 0	Bordeaux	Fontvieille
20:00 CET UTC+1		Report	Henrique (yellow card) 19'	Stadium: Stade Louis II; Attendance: 11,456; Referee: Philippe Kalt

10 March 2007 28	Toulouse	1 – 1	AS Monaco	Toulouse
17:10 CET UTC+1	Mathieu 26'; Mansaré (yellow card) 80'	Report	Pérez (yellow card) 70'; Koller 76' (yellow card) 79'; Leko (yellow card) 77'	Stadium: Stadium Municipal; Attendance: 27,595; Referee: Stéphane Lannoy

17 March 2007 29	AS Monaco	2 – 1	Nantes	Fontvieille
20:00 CET UTC+1	Pérez 35'; Givet 43'; Bolívar (yellow card) 44'; Monsoreau (yellow card) 56'; Leko (yellow card) 78'; Cufré (yellow card) 84'	Report	Da Rocha 14' das Neves (yellow card) 52'; Vainqueur (yellow card) 66'	Stadium: Stade Louis II; Attendance: 9,493; Referee: Philippe Malige

1 April 2007 30	Nice	1 – 1	AS Monaco	Nice
16:00 CEST UTC+2	Laslandes 11'; Rool (yellow card) 15' (yellow-red card) 55'; Fanni (yellow card) 87'; Echouafni (yellow card) 90+2'	Report	Monsoreau (yellow card) 41'; Pérez (yellow card) 55'; Koller (yellow card) 67'; Plašil 80' dos Santos (yellow card) 84'	Stadium: Stade du Ray; Attendance: 13,524; Referee: Éric Poulat

7 April 2007 31	AS Monaco	0 – 0	Troyes	Fontvieille
20:00 CEST UTC+2	Touré (yellow card) 30'	Report	Bangoura (yellow card) 30'	Stadium: Stade Louis II; Attendance: 9,311; Referee: Alexandre Castro

14 April 2007 32	Lorient	0 – 0	AS Monaco	Lorient
20:00 CEST UTC+2	Morel (yellow card) 28'	Report	Cufré (yellow card) 31'; Ménez (yellow card) 36'	Stadium: Stade du Moustoir; Attendance: 14,213; Referee: Saïd Ennjimi

21 April 2007 33	AS Monaco	3 – 1	Lille	Fontvieille
20:00 CEST UTC+2	Pérez (yellow card) 18'; Meriem 42'; Bolívar (yellow card) 52'; Monsoreau 68'; Ménez 76'	Report	Rafael (yellow card) 67'; Keïta 85'; Makoun (yellow card) 88'; Dumont (red card) 90+3'	Stadium: Stade Louis II; Attendance: 10,004; Referee: Olivier Thual

28 April 2007 34	Valenciennes	2 – 2	AS Monaco	Valenciennes
20:00 CEST UTC+2	Haddad 84'; Chelle 89'	Report	Ménez 46'; Leko (yellow card) 52' dos Santos (yellow card) 59'; Koller 66'	Stadium: Stade Nungesser; Attendance: 15,816; Referee: Thierry Auriac

6 May 2007 35	AS Monaco	1 – 2	Marseille	Fontvieille
21:05 CEST UTC+2	Ménez 12'; Pérez (yellow card) 59'; Monsoreau (yellow card) 84'; Leko (yellow card) 89'	Report	Ribéry 45'; Niang (yellow card) 81' (goal) 84' (pen.); Rodriguez (yellow card) 90+4'	Stadium: Stade Louis II; Attendance: 16,401; Referee: Saïd Ennjimi

9 May 2007 36	Sochaux	2 – 1	AS Monaco	Montbéliard
18:00 CEST UTC+2	Touré 29' (o.g.); Pichot (yellow card) 73'; Grax (yellow card) 80'; Brunel (yellow card) 90+1'	Report	Piquionne 45'; Touré (red card) 66'	Stadium: Stade Auguste Bonal; Attendance: 13,451; Referee: Hervé Piccirillo

19 May 2007 37	AS Monaco	1 – 0	Lyon	Fontvieille
20:45 CEST UTC+2	Modesto (yellow card) 43'; Ménez 58'; Meriem (yellow card) 67'; Pérez (yellow card) 77'	Report	Cris (yellow card) 26'	Stadium: Stade Louis II; Attendance: 13,145; Referee: Damien Ledentu

26 May 2007 38	AS Monaco	2 – 0	Nancy	Fontvieille
20:45 CEST UTC+2	Koller 10'; Piquionne 56'; Bakar (yellow card) 77'	Report		Stadium: Stade Louis II; Attendance: 7,933; Referee: Sandryk Biton

=== Coupe de la Ligue ===
20 September 2006 Third round	Valenciennes	0 – 0 (a.e.t.) (4 – 5 p)	AS Monaco	Valenciennes
21:00 CET UTC+1	Silvestri (yellow card) 42'; Liron (yellow card) 45+1'; Saez (yellow card) 101'	Report	Givet (yellow card) 102'; Di Vaio (yellow card) 116'	Stadium: Stade du Hainaut; Attendance: 4,792; Referee: Fredy Fautrel
	Penalties
	Silvestri (penalty missed); Kharroubi (penalty scored); Roudet (penalty scored); Bourgeois (penalty scored); Hassli (penalty scored)		Givet (penalty scored); Di Vaio (penalty scored); Gerard (penalty scored); Bernardi (penalty scored); Monsoreau (penalty scored)

24 October 2006 Round of 16	Stade Reims	0 – 0 (a.e.t.) (4 – 3 p)	AS Monaco	Reims
20:00 CET UTC+1	Jeannel (yellow card) 86'; Baléguhé (yellow card) 107'	Report	Bernardi (yellow card) 49'; Pérez (yellow card) 78'	Stadium: Stade Auguste Delaune; Attendance: 9,167; Referee: Stéphane Moulin
	Penalties
	Fauré (penalty scored); Comminges (penalty scored); Féret (penalty scored); Bonnal (penalty missed); Jeannel (penalty scored)		Meriem (penalty scored); Givet (penalty missed); Gakpé (penalty scored); Ménez (penalty scored); Di Vaio (penalty missed)

=== Coupe de France ===
6 January 2007 Round of 64	US Quevilly	0 – 2	AS Monaco	Le Petit-Quevilly
CET UTC+1		[ Report]	Meriem 67'; Vargas 90'	Stadium: Stadium Lozai Amable Le Grand-Quevilly

21 January 2007 Round of 32	AS Monaco	2 – 0	Toulouse	Fontvieille
CET UTC+1	Meriem 37', 90'	[ Report]		Stadium: Stade Louis II

30 January 2007 Round of 16	AS Monaco	0 – 2	Sochaux	Fontvieille
CET UTC+1		Report	Pitau 27'; Le Tallec 63'	Stadium: Stade Louis II

== Statistics ==
As of match played 26 May 2007

=== Appearances and goals ===
No.	Pos	Nat	Player	Total		Ligue 1		Coupe de France		Coupe de la Ligue	
No.	Pos	Nat	Player	Apps	Goals	Apps	Goals	Apps	Goals	Apps	Goals
2	DF	(France) FRA	Sylvain Monsoreau	32	1	27+3	1	0	0	2	0
3	DF	(France) FRA	Manuel dos Santos	26	0	22+3	0	0	0	0+1	0
4	DF	(France) FRA	François Modesto	26	1	21+4	1	0	0	1	0
5	MF	(Uruguay) URU	Diego Pérez	27	2	22+3	2	0	0	1+1	0
6	MF	(Czech Republic) CZE	Jaroslav Plašil	31	1	23+7	1	0	0	1	0
7	MF	(Argentina) ARG	Lucas Bernardi	18	0	16	0	0	0	2	0
8	MF	(Spain) ESP	Gerard	7	1	1+5	1	0	0	0+1	0
9	FW	(Czech Republic) CZE	Jan Koller	34	8	26+6	8	0	0	1+1	0
10	FW	(France) FRA	Jérémy Ménez	31	7	23+6	7	0	0	1+1	0
13	FW	(Colombia) COL	Juan Pablo Pino	8	0	1+7	0	0	0	0	0
15	MF	(Ivory Coast) CIV	Yaya Touré	28	5	24+3	5	0	0	1	0
17	MF	(France) FRA	Serge Gakpe	24	4	16+7	4	0	0	1	0
18	FW	(Sierra Leone) SLE	Mohamed Kallon	12	2	6+6	2	0	0	0	0
19	FW	(Uruguay) URU	Gonzalo Vargas	9	0	5+3	0	0	0	0+1	0
20	FW	(France) FRA	Frédéric Piquionne	14	5	12+2	5	0	0	0	0
21	MF	(France) FRA	Camel Meriem	26	2	18+7	2	0	0	1	0
22	DF	(Brazil) BRA	Bolívar	36	0	34	0	0	0	2	0
23	MF	(Croatia) CRO	Jerko Leko	28	1	18+10	1	0	0	0	0
25	DF	(Argentina) ARG	Leandro Cufré	21	0	20	0	0	0	1	0
26	DF	(Senegal) SEN	Massamba Sambou	4	0	4	0	0	0	0	0
27	FW	(France) FRA	Frédéric Nimani	4	1	0+3	1	0	0	1	0
28	MF	(France) FRA	Djamel Bakar	4	0	0+4	0	0	0	0	0
30	GK	(Italy) ITA	Flavio Roma	40	0	38	0	0	0	2	0
32	DF	(France) FRA	Gaël Givet	34	1	32	1	0	0	2	0
Players away from the club on loan:
11	FW	(France) FRA	Sébastien Grax	4	0	1+3	0	0	0	0	0
22	FW	(France) FRA	David Gigliotti	1	0	1	0	0	0	0	0
31	DF	(France) FRA	Olivier Veigneau	1	0	1	0	0	0	0	0
Players who appeared for Monaco no longer at the club:
20	FW	(Italy) ITA	Marco Di Vaio	16	3	6+8	3	0	0	2	0

=== Goal scorers ===
Place	Position	Nation	Number	Name	Ligue 1	Coupe de France	Coupe de la Ligue	Total
1	FW	(Czech Republic)	9	Jan Koller	8	0	0	8
2	FW	(France)	10	Jérémy Ménez	7	0	0	7
3	MF	(Ivory Coast)	15	Yaya Touré	5	0	0	5
3	FW	(France)	20	Frédéric Piquionne	5	0	0	5
3	MF	(France)	21	Camel Meriem	2	3	0	5
6	MF	(France)	17	Serge Gakpé	4	0	0	4
7	FW	(Italy)	20	Marco Di Vaio	3	0	0	3
8	FW	(Sierra Leone)	18	Mohamed Kallon	2	0	0	2
8	MF	(Uruguay)	5	Diego Pérez	2	0	0	2
10	MF	(Spain)	8	Gerard	1	0	0	1
10	DF	(France)	4	François Modesto	1	0	0	1
10	FW	(France)	27	Frédéric Nimani	1	0	0	1
10	MF	(Croatia)	23	Jerko Leko	1	0	0	1
10	DF	(France)	32	Gaël Givet	1	0	0	1
10	MF	(Czech Republic)	6	Jaroslav Plašil	1	0	0	1
10	DF	(France)	2	Sylvain Monsoreau	1	0	0	1
10	FW	(Uruguay)	19	Gonzalo Vargas	0	1	0	1
				TOTALS	45	4	0	49

=== Disciplinary record ===
Number	Nation	Position	Name	Ligue 1		Coupe de France		Coupe de la Ligue		Total	
Number	Nation	Position	Name	Yellow card	Red card	Yellow card	Red card	Yellow card	Red card	Yellow card	Red card
2	(France)	DF	Sylvain Monsoreau	4	0			0	0	4	0
3	(France)	DF	Manuel dos Santos	2	0			0	0	2	0
4	(France)	DF	François Modesto	3	0			0	0	3	0
5	(Uruguay)	MF	Diego Pérez	10	1			1	0	11	1
6	(Czech Republic)	MF	Jaroslav Plašil	5	1			0	0	5	1
7	(Argentina)	MF	Lucas Bernardi	8	1			1	0	9	1
8	(Spain)	MF	Gerard	1	0			0	0	1	0
9	(Czech Republic)	FW	Jan Koller	3	0			0	0	3	0
10	(France)	FW	Jérémy Ménez	5	0			0	0	5	0
15	(Ivory Coast)	MF	Yaya Touré	2	1			0	0	2	1
17	(France)	MF	Serge Gakpé	5	0			0	0	5	0
18	(Sierra Leone)	FW	Mohamed Kallon	0	1			0	0	0	1
20	(Italy)	FW	Marco Di Vaio	0	0			1	0	1	0
20	(France)	FW	Frédéric Piquionne	1	0			0	0	1	0
21	(France)	MF	Camel Meriem	1	0			0	0	1	0
22	(France)	FW	David Gigliotti	2	1			0	0	2	1
22	(Brazil)	DF	Bolívar	2	0			0	0	2	0
23	(Croatia)	MF	Jerko Leko	15	0			0	0	15	0
25	(Argentina)	DF	Leandro Cufré	8	1			0	0	8	1
26	(Senegal)	DF	Massamba Sambou	1	0			0	0	1	0
28	(France)	MF	Djamel Bakar	1	0			0	0	1	0
30	(Italy)	GK	Flavio Roma	3	0			0	0	3	0
32	(France)	DF	Gaël Givet	3	0			1	0	4	0
			TOTALS	85	7			4	0	89	7
