= Marco Di Vaio =

Italian footballer (born 1976)

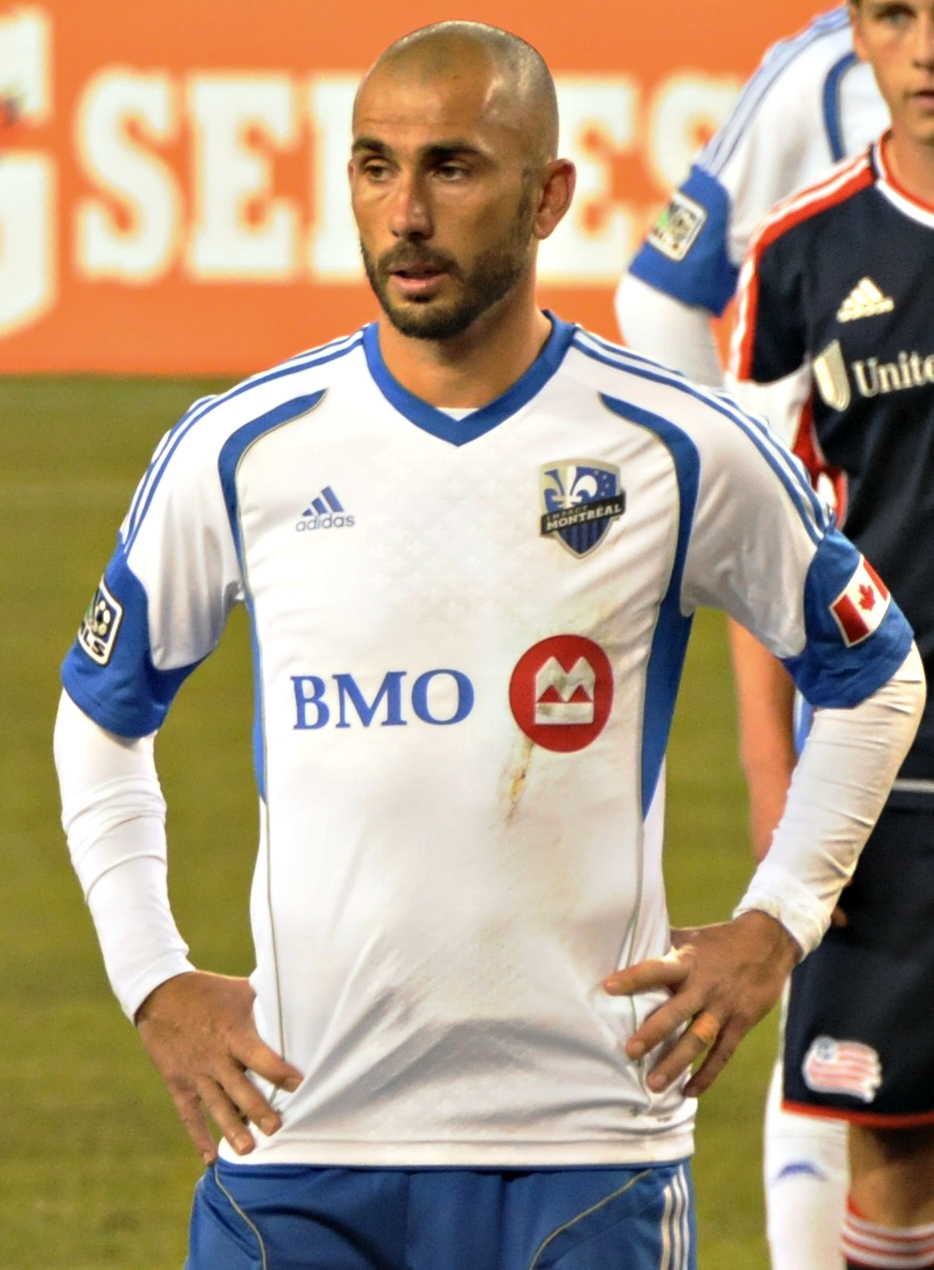
- Di Vaio playing for the Montreal Impact in 2013

Personal information
- Full name: Marco Di Vaio
- Date of birth: 15 July 1976 (age 50)
- Place of birth: Rome, Italy
- Height: 1.80 m (5 ft 11 in)
- Position: Striker

Youth career
- 1991–1994: Lazio

Senior career*
Years	Team	Apps	(Gls)
1993–1995	Lazio	8	(3)
1995–1996	Verona	7	(1)
1996–1997	Bari	27	(3)
1997–1999	Salernitana	67	(33)
1999–2002	Parma	83	(41)
2002–2004	Juventus	55	(18)
2004–2006	Valencia	35	(11)
2006–2007	Monaco	29	(8)
2007–2008	Genoa	44	(12)
2008–2012	Bologna	143	(65)
2012–2014	Montreal Impact	76	(34)
Total		575	(230)

International career
1993–1994	Italy U18	3	(0)
2001–2004	Italy	14	(2)
- * Club domestic league appearances and goals

Marco Di Vaio (Italian pronunciation: [ˈmarko di ˈvaːjo]; born 15 July 1976) is an Italian former professional footballer who played as a striker. A prolific goalscorer, in his long club career, Di Vaio scored over 200 league goals while playing for several clubs, mainly in Italy, as well as in France, Spain and Canada. At international level, Di Vaio represented the Italy national football team at Euro 2004.

== Club career ==
=== Early career ===
Di Vaio started his career at his hometown club Lazio. He made his Serie A debut on 20 November 1994 against Padova. He then played for Serie B clubs such as Verona and Bari, before moving to Salernitana in 1997.

=== Salernitana ===
He was a revelation at Salernitana, leading them to their second promotion to the Serie A in 1997–98 as the top scorer in Serie B for that season.

=== Parma ===
Despite Salernitana's relegation the following season, Di Vaio remained in Serie A, after being purchased by Parma. He scored an impressive number of goals for the Gialloblu and he went on to become the 2nd highest scorer of the league in his third season for the team.

=== Juventus ===
Juventus won the race to sign him during the following summer (2002), by paying Parma €7 million (€2 million plus 50% registration rights of Brighi) for the loan.

But Di Vaio never really reproduced the form he showed at Parma, mainly because of the immense competition for a first-team places at Juventus. Initially a loan signing, he was signed permanently in summer 2003 for €14 million.

During his stay with Juventus, he managed to win one scudetto, and reached 2003 UEFA Champions League final.

=== Valencia ===
Due to an early exit from the UEFA Champions League 2003–04 and coupled with the arrival of new coach Fabio Capello, Juventus began a restructuring of their first team squad. As a result, Di Vaio and his striking partner Fabrizio Miccoli were soon frozen out. Di Vaio moved to defending UEFA Cup and La Liga champions Valencia on a five-year contract, costing Valencia € 10.5million, joining up with fellow countrymen, coach Claudio Ranieri and new signing Bernardo Corradi. Di Vaio partnered Corradi up front in ten La Liga matches, creating a total of four goals. He managed a mere eleven league goals during his spell in Spain.

His presence in the first team line-up of Valencia became restricted with the arrivals of Patrick Kluivert and David Villa, along with the sacking of Ranieri. New coach Quique Sánchez Flores preferred to use Miguel Ángel Angulo as Villa's strike partner or utilised a 4–5–1 formation, with Villa as the lone frontman. This restricted Di Vaio to only one league start during the 2005–06 season.

=== Monaco ===
In January 2006, Di Vaio was loaned out to Ligue 1 side Monaco with an option to make the deal permanent. Along with Di Vaio, countryman Christian Vieri was also signed and partnered him for seven French league matches, yielding three goals, all of which were scored by Vieri. Initially an insurance signing for injured Javier Chevantón, and to replace the departing Emmanuel Adebayor, the Italian duo created opportunities for Chevantón to score goals in the second half of the season.

In his second season, Di Vaio became the third choice striker behind new signings Jan Koller and Jérémy Menez, restricting him to just six first team appearances.

=== Genoa ===
On 22 January 2007, after an unsuccessful spell in Ligue 1, Di Vaio surprisingly returned to Italy by signing with Serie B club Genoa, a side strongly pushing for promotion, for €1.8 million. The club duly achieved promotion, but once in Serie A, the partnership of Marco Borriello and Giuseppe Sculli was preferred, leaving Di Vaio to make only nine appearances.

=== Bologna ===
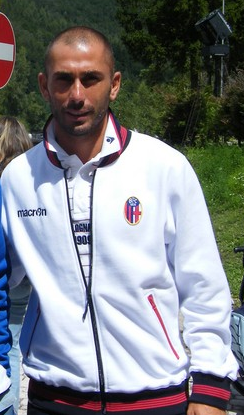
Di Vaio at Bologna, 2011

On 21 August 2008, it was confirmed that Di Vaio had signed for Serie A side Bologna, recently promoted from Serie B. This reunited with former Genoa teammate Adaílton. Di Vaio was a surprise star in the 2008–09 season, scoring an impressive 24 goals for a mediocre Bologna side. He finished the season as joint second top-scorer alongside Genoa striker Diego Milito. At the end of season, Bologna signed him on free transfer.

In his period at Bologna, Di Vaio regained reputation as a key prolific striker, rapidly becoming a fan favourite, as well as team captain and one of the reference players during the two club takeovers in the 2010–11 season, ensuring himself a contract extension until June 2013; following the announcement, Di Vaio also state his desire to spend the rest of his footballing career as a Bologna player. However, on 4 May 2012, Di Vaio confirmed that the 2011–12 season will be his last with Bologna, and that he would be considering various options for his future.

=== Montreal Impact ===
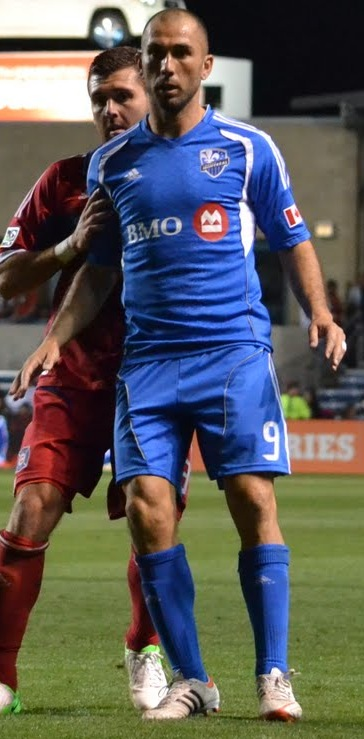
Di Vaio vs. the Chicago Fire in September 2012

After lengthy negotiations, Montreal Impact announced that Marco Di Vaio had signed as the Canadian club's first Designated Player. Di Vaio made his Impact debut on 27 June 2012 against Toronto FC, and scored his first goal a month later on 28 July 2012 against New York Red Bulls. Di Vaio scored his first goal of the 2014 season against Philadelphia Union on 29 March 2014. On 25 October 2014, in his last game as a professional, Di Vaio scored the opening goal in a 1–1 draw at home to D.C. United. Di Vaio retired following the 2014 season.

== International career ==
Di Vaio made his senior International debut for Italy under manager Giovanni Trapattoni, on 5 September 2001, in a friendly match in Piacenza against Morocco, which ended in a 1–0 home victory to Italy. He scored his first goal for Italy on 11 October 2003, in Reggio Calabria, in a 4–0 home win over Azerbaijan in a UEFA Euro 2004 qualifying match. Di Vaio played for Italy at Euro 2004 under Giovanni Trapattoni, appearing in Italy's final group match, which ended in a 2–1 victory over Bulgaria, although Italy were still eliminated in the first round of the competition. Di Vaio later received several call-ups from Marcello Lippi who had previously coached Di Vaio at Juventus. However, a loss of form whilst with Valencia, coupled with the emergence of Luca Toni and Alberto Gilardino, led to Di Vaio losing his place with the national team. He made his final appearance for Italy with Lippi on 9 October 2004, in a 1–0 away loss to Slovenia, in a 2006 World Cup Qualifying match. In total, Di Vaio appeared 14 times with the national side, scoring two goals.

== Post-retirement ==
Di Vaio joined Bologna as club manager after his retirement as a footballer.

== Style of play ==
Mainly playing as a goalscorer, Di Vaio was capable of playing anywhere along the front-line, due to his technique and distribution. He preferred to play a centre-forward, where he could take advantage of his goalscoring ability in the area and skill in the air. He also had an accurate shot from distance, and was an accurate penalty taker.

== Career statistics ==
=== Club ===
As of 29 September 2013

Appearances and goals by club, season and competition
Club	Season	League			National cup (Note: Includes Coppa Italia, Copa del Rey, Coupe de France, Canadian Championship)		League cup (Note: Includes Coupe de la Ligue)		Continental		Other		Total	
Club	Season	Division	Apps	Goals	Apps	Goals	Apps	Goals	Apps	Goals	Apps	Goals	Apps	Goals
Lazio	1993–94	Serie A	0	0	1	0	–		1 (Note: Appearance(s) in UEFA Cup)	0	–		2	0
Lazio	1994–95	Serie A	8	3	4	0	–		1	1	–		13	4
Lazio	Total		8	3	5	0	–		2	1	–		15	4
Verona	1995–96	Serie B	7	1	0	0	–		–		–		7	1
Bari	1996–97	Serie B	27	3	0	0	–		–		–		27	3
Salernitana	1997–98	Serie B	36	21	2	0	–		–		–		38	21
Salernitana	1998–99	Serie A	31	12	1	0	–		–		–		32	12
Salernitana	Total		67	33	3	0	–		–		–		70	33
Parma	1999–2000	Serie A	23	6	0	0	–		10 (Note: Two appearances in UEFA Champions League, eight appearances and seven goals in UEFA Cup)	7	2 (Note: One appearance in Supercoppa Italiana, one appearance in Serie A UEFA Champions League qualification play-off)	0	35	13
Parma	2000–01	Serie A	27	15	7	3	–		5	2	–		39	20
Parma	2001–02	Serie A	33	20	6	1	–		10 (Note: Two appearances in UEFA Champions League, eight appearances and two goals in UEFA Cup)	2	–		49	23
Parma	2002–03	Serie A	–		–		–		–		1 (Note: Appearance in Supercoppa Italiana)	1	1	1
Parma	Total		83	41	13	4	–		25	11	3	1	124	57
Juventus	2002–03	Serie A	26	7	3	0	–		11 (Note: Appearances in UEFA Champions League)	4	–		40	11
Juventus	2003–04	Serie A	29	11	7	3	–		7	3	1	0	44	17
Juventus	Total		55	18	10	3	–		18	7	1	0	84	28
Valencia	2004–05	La Liga	30	11	0	0	–		7 (Note: Five appearances and one goal in UEFA Champions League, two appearances and one goal in UEFA Cup)	2	2 (Note: One appearance in Supercopa de España, one appearance and one goal in UEFA Super Cup)	1	39	14
Valencia	2005–06	La Liga	5	0	0	0	–		6 (Note: Appearances in UEFA Intertoto Cup)	0	–		11	0
Valencia	Total		35	11	0	0	–		13	2	2	1	50	14
Monaco	2005–06	Ligue 1	15	5	1	0	2	0	–		–		18	5
Monaco	2006–07	Ligue 1	14	3	1	0	2	0	–		–		17	3
Monaco	Total		29	8	2	0	4	0	–		–		35	8
Genoa	2006–07	Serie B	22	9	0	0	–		–		–		22	9
Genoa	2007–08	Serie A	22	3	2	1	–		–		–		24	4
Genoa	Total		44	12	2	1	–		–		–		46	13
Bologna	2008–09	Serie A	38	24	2	1	–		–		–		40	25
Bologna	2009–10	Serie A	30	12	1	0	–		–		–		31	12
Bologna	2010–11	Serie A	38	19	1	0	–		–		–		39	19
Bologna	2011–12	Serie A	37	10	1	0	–		–		–		38	10
Bologna	Total		143	65	5	1	–		–		–		148	66
Montreal Impact	2012	Major League Soccer	17	5	3	0	–		–		–		20	5
Montreal Impact	2013	Major League Soccer	33	20	3	2	–		–		–		36	22
Montreal Impact	2014	Major League Soccer	26	9	4	0	–		3 (Note: Appearances in CONCACAF Champions League)	4	–		33	13
Montreal Impact	Total		76	34	10	2	–		3	4	–		89	40
Career total			574	229	50	11	4	0	61	25	6	2	695	267

=== International ===
Italy
Year	Apps	Goals
2001	1	0
2002	4	0
2003	5	2
2004	4	0
Total	14	2

=== International statistics ===
International appearances and goals
#	Date	Venue	Opponent	Result	Goal	Competition
1	5 September 2001	Piacenza, Italy	Morocco	1–0	0	Friendly
2	13 February 2002	Catania, Italy	United States	1–0	0	Friendly
3	17 April 2002	Milan, Italy	Uruguay	1–1	0	Friendly
4	21 August 2002	Trieste, Italy	Slovenia	0–1	0	Friendly
5	20 November 2002	Pescara, Italy	Turkey	1–1	0	Friendly
6	30 April 2003	Geneva Switzerland	Switzerland	2–1	0	Friendly
7	3 June 2003	Campobasso, Italy	Northern Ireland	2–0	0	Friendly
8	11 October 2003	Reggio Calabria, Italy	Azerbaijan	4–0	1	UEFA Euro 2004 qualifying
9	12 November 2003	Warsaw, Poland	Poland	1–3	0	Friendly
10	16 November 2003	Ancona, Italy	Romania	1–0	1	Friendly
11	28 April 2004	Genoa, Italy	Spain	1–1	0	Friendly
12	22 June 2004	Guimarães, Portugal	Bulgaria	2–1	0	UEFA Euro 2004
13	18 August 2004	Reykjavík, Iceland	Iceland	0–2	0	Friendly
14	9 October 2004	Celje, Slovenia	Slovenia	0–1	0	2006 FIFA World Cup qualifying

== Honours ==
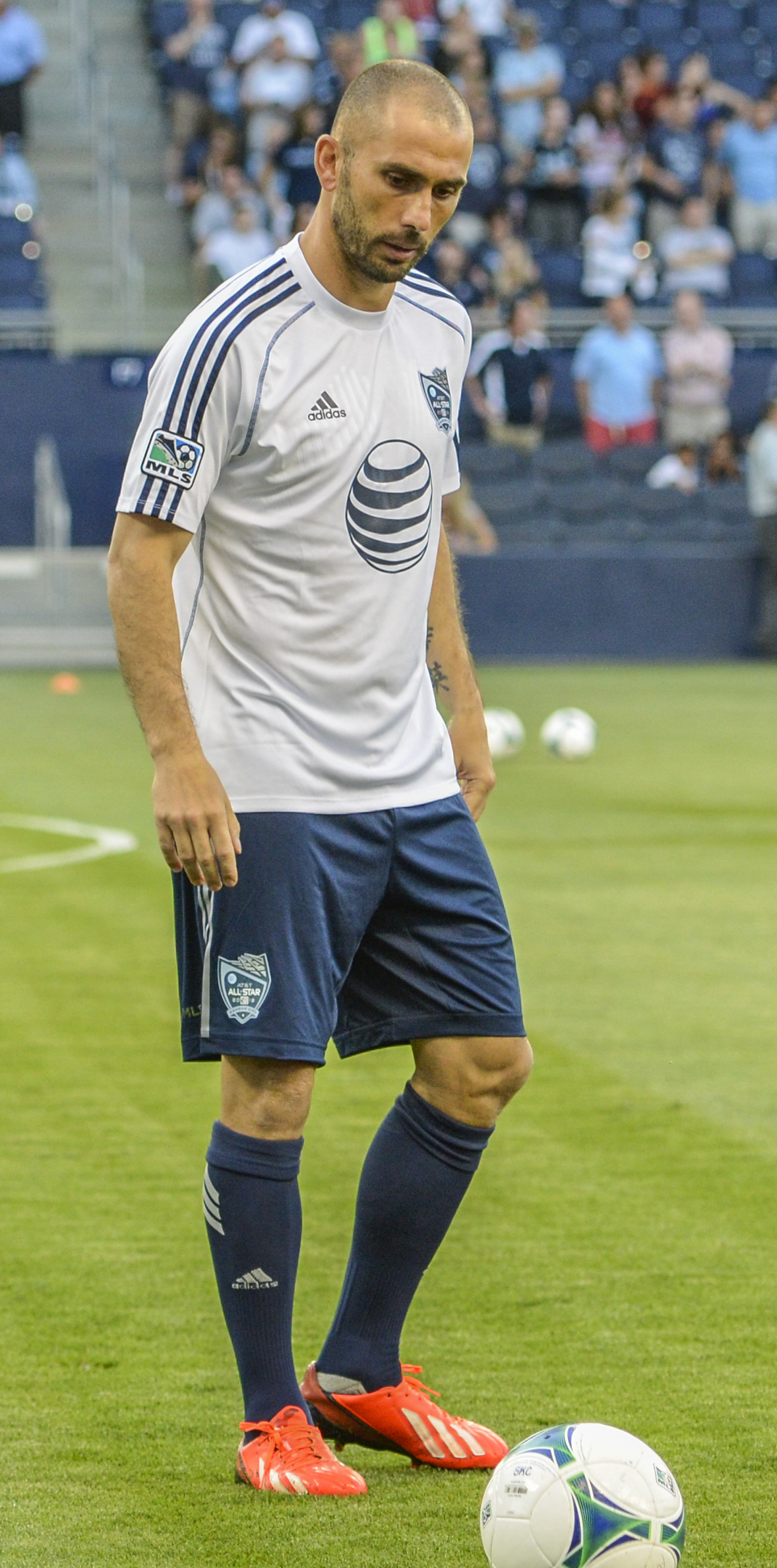
Di Vaio at the 2013 MLS All-Star Game

Salernitana

- Serie B: 1997–98

Parma

- Coppa Italia: 2001–02
- Supercoppa Italiana: 1999

Juventus

- Serie A: 2002–03
- Supercoppa Italiana: 2003
- UEFA Champions League runner-up: 2002–03

Valencia

- UEFA Super Cup: 2004

Montreal Impact

- Canadian Championship: 2013, 2014

Individual

- Serie B top scorer: 1997–98
- MLS All-Star: 2013
- MLS Best XI: 2013
- Montreal Impact Most Valuable Player: 2013
- Montreal Impact Top Scorer: 2013, 2014
