= Jérémy Ménez =

French association football player (born 1987)

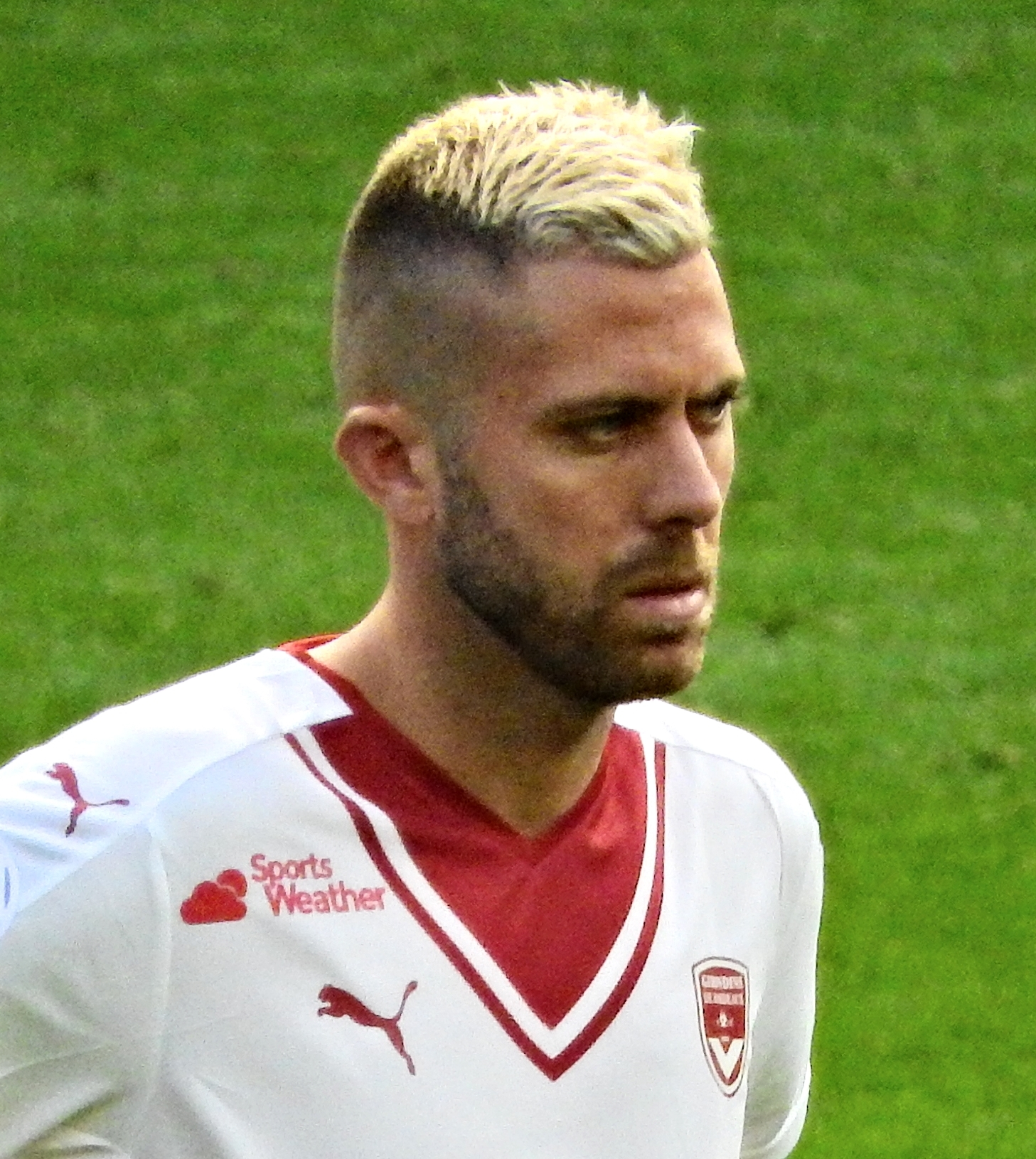
- Ménez playing for Bordeaux in 2016

Personal information
- Full name: Jérémy Ménez
- Date of birth: 7 May 1987 (age 39)
- Place of birth: Longjumeau, France
- Height: 1.83 m (6 ft 0 in)
- Positions: Forward; winger

Youth career
- 1994–1995: CA Vitry
- 1995–2000: CFF Paris
- 2000–2001: CSF Brétigny
- 2001–2004: Sochaux

Senior career*
Years	Team	Apps	(Gls)
2004–2006	Sochaux	55	(7)
2006–2008	Monaco	57	(14)
2008–2011	Roma	84	(7)
2011–2014	Paris Saint-Germain	79	(14)
2014–2016	AC Milan	43	(18)
2016–2017	Bordeaux	26	(3)
2017–2018	Antalyaspor	7	(0)
2018–2019	América	18	(5)
2019–2020	Paris FC	17	(4)
2020–2023	Reggina	67	(13)
2023–2024	Bari	10	(0)
Total		463	(85)

International career
2007–2008	France U21	9	(2)
2010–2013	France	24	(2)
Medal record
Men's football
Representing France
UEFA European Under-17 Championship
Winner	2004 France
- * Club domestic league appearances and goals

Jérémy Ménez (born 7 May 1987) is a French former professional footballer who played as a forward. Ménez has been described as an ambipedal, technically skilled, pacy playmaker.

Ménez began his career spending time with various clubs in the Île-de-France region such as the Centre de Formation de Paris and CSF Brétigny. In 2001, he secured a move to Sochaux and spent four years in the club's youth academy. In March 2004, Ménez became the youngest professional football player in the history of Ligue 1 after signing a professional contract and made his professional debut in the 2004–05 season. With Sochaux, he played European football for the first time after participating in the 2004–05 edition of the UEFA Cup. After two seasons at the club, he joined Monaco. At Monaco, Ménez developed into a playmaking midfielder under the tutelage of Brazilian manager Ricardo Gomes. After two successful seasons in Monaco, he signed for Serie A club Roma on a four-year contract. With Roma, Ménez featured in the UEFA Champions League for the first time and scored 12 goals in over 100 appearances with the club. In July 2011, after three seasons with Roma, Ménez returned to France signing a three-year contract with Paris Saint-Germain. He was then signed by AC Milan on a free transfer in June 2014, signing a three-year contract.

Ménez is a former French youth international and has represented his nation at every level for which he was eligible. Prior to playing for the senior team, he played in the under-17 team that won the 2004 UEFA European Under-17 Championship. Ménez made his senior international debut in August 2010 in a friendly match against Norway. He represented his country at the Euro 2012.

== Club career ==
=== Early career ===
Ménez was born in Longjumeau, Essonne. As a child, he grew up in Vitry-sur-Seine, not far from his birthplace, and supported hometown club Paris Saint-Germain. Ménez became attracted to football through his father and older brother who were football players themselves. Ménez began his career at local club CA Vitry. After a year at the club, Ménez joined the Centre de Formation de Paris, a youth sporting club designed to cater only to football players under the age of 19. While at C.F.F.P, Ménez developed and honed his technical skills and was placed into the playmaker position by his coaches. After five years at the academy, he departed the club after developing friction with the academy coaches. After leaving CFFP, Ménez joined CSF Brétigny, a local Parisian club that also trained French internationals Patrice Evra and Jimmy Briand. He spent only a year at the club before securing a move to professional club Sochaux in Franche-Comté.

=== Sochaux ===
Upon his arrival at Sochaux, Ménez entered the club's youth academy and began attending the sports department's elite high school, Vignes de Seloncourt, with ambitions of becoming an accountant. While in the club's academy, Ménez was adept both on and off the field earning good grades in school. On 24 March 2004, at the age of 16, he signed his first professional contract with Sochaux, agreeing to a three-year deal until June 2007. Upon signing the contract, he became the youngest professional football player in the history of Ligue 1. Ménez was subsequently promoted to the club's senior team and assigned the number 26 shirt by manager Guy Lacombe. Prior to signing his contract, Ménez drew strong interest from English clubs Arsenal and Manchester United. The latter club's manager at the time, Sir Alex Ferguson, was later accused by Sochaux's former president Jean-Claude Plessis of tapping up Ménez; he accused Ferguson of meeting with the player's parents in Paris and offering them financial favours. Manchester United denied the accusations. Ménez travelled to Manchester and visited the team's facilities and Old Trafford, the club's stadium, before deciding to remain in France.

On 7 August 2004, Ménez made his professional debut in the club's opening match of the 2004–05 season against Ajaccio. He started the match and played 57 minutes before being substituted for in a 1–0 win. Despite being so young, Ménez was a regular within the team, often rotating between the bench and starting XI. On 20 November, he scored his first professional goal in a 3–1 victory over Monaco. Two months later, Ménez became the youngest player in league history to score a hat-trick after recording one in the team's 4–0 victory over Bordeaux. He scored the goals in a seven-minute span to assure Sochaux of victory. Ménez was a regular during the team's 2004–05 UEFA Cup campaign, appearing in six matches with the club. Sochaux suffered elimination in the Round of 32 at the hands of Greek club Olympiacos. Following the season, Ménez was nominated for the UNFP Young Player of the Year award but lost out to Nantes midfielder Jérémy Toulalan.

For the 2005–06 season, Ménez switched to the number 11 shirt and was given a more prominent role within the team by new manager Dominique Bijotat. He appeared in 31 league matches, fifth-best on the team, and scored three goals. Ménez scored his first goal on 15 October 2005 in a 1–1 draw against Bordeaux. At the beginning of the new year, Ménez scored his final two goals in another 1–1 draw with Nice and a 4–0 victory over Saint-Étienne. Sochaux finished the season in a disappointing 15th position after finishing the four previous seasons in the top ten. This led Ménez to become unsettled and to declare his desire to leave the club. On 8 June 2006, Sochaux chairman Dassier announced that he would consider offers for the player with Ligue 1 clubs Paris Saint-Germain, Bordeaux, Monaco and English club Arsenal reported to be interested.

=== Monaco ===
On 22 June 2006, Sochaux announced on its website that it had reached an agreement with fellow Ligue 1 club Monaco for the transfer of Ménez. He signed a four-year contract, with the transfer fee undisclosed. Ménez was given the number 10 shirt by manager László Bölöni and inserted into his preferred left-winger position. He made his club debut on 19 August in the team's 1–1 draw with Rennes, appearing as a substitute. On 30 September, Ménez scored his first goal for the club in a 2–1 win over Le Mans, netting the game-winner ten minutes from time. Following the firing of Bölöni and the arrival of new manager Ricardo Gomes, Ménez struggled to get consistent playing time and grew frustrated, which led to interest abroad from Manchester United and Liverpool. On 11 November, however, he was re-inserted into the starting line-up and scored the equalising goal in a 2–2 draw with Lorient. Ménez maintained his form into the new year, but struggled for fitness in February due to a groin injury. The injury required surgery and Ménez missed two months of play. He returned to the team in April and scored goals in three-straight matches against Lille, Valenciennes and Marseille. Ménez finished the 2006–07 campaign by scoring the only goal in a win over the champions Lyon.

Despite summer interest from English Premier League clubs, Ménez opted to remain at Monaco. In the 2007–08 campaign, he scored his first goal in the team's 3–0 victory over his former club Sochaux. The following week, he netted again, this time in a 3–1 win over Le Mans. On 15 December, Ménez scored a double in a 3–1 victory against Lens. It was his first multi-goal game since his hat-trick three years prior. The following month, Ménez scored both of the team's goal in a 2–0 away win against Metz. On 23 February 2008, he suffered an injury in a league match against Paris-Saint Germain, which led to him leaving the match at half-time. The injury was discovered to be serious and Ménez missed three months before returning for the final two matches of the season, making obligatory substitute appearances.

=== Roma ===
After featuring in Monaco's first three league matches of the season, it was reported on 27 August 2008 that Ménez had signed a four-year contract with Italian club Roma. The transfer fee was priced at €10.5 million with Monaco set to receive another €1.5 million in incentives. Ménez was announced as the replacement for departed wingers Mancini and Ludovic Giuly and selected the number 24 shirt, the former number of club legend Marco Delvecchio. He made his debut for the club on 31 August in the team's Serie A match against Napoli, appearing as a substitute in the 63rd minute. Ménez made his UEFA Champions League debut in the team's group stage match against Bordeaux, playing 51 minutes in a 3–1 victory. On 6 December, he scored his first goal for the club in a 1–0 victory over Chievo. For the majority of the campaign, however, Ménez struggled for consistent playing time, rarely lasting an entire match and often starting on the bench for consecutive matches under Luciano Spalletti. On 24 May 2009, he appeared as a substitute in the 75th minute against AC Milan. After five minutes on the field, Ménez scored a goal to put Roma up 2–1; the capital club went on to win the match 3–2. The following week, he started the match and scored a goal in a 3–2 win over Torino.

For the 2009–10 season, Ménez switched to the unusual number 94 shirt. He scored his first goal against Milan on 18 October 2009. On 6 January 2010, he drew the ire of new manager Claudio Ranieri and several teammates, who criticised him for his substitute appearance against Cagliari in which he gave a somewhat lackadaisical effort. Following the criticism, Ménez stated, "I touched the lowest point of my career in that game away to Cagliari," and, "My teammates were right to criticise me." On 11 January, Ménez issued an apology to coach Ranieri and his teammates and brushed off rumours of him issuing a transfer request by declaring himself fully committed to the team. On 30 January, midfielder Simone Perrotta stated that Ménez simply needed a confidence boost. After appearing as a substitute for four consecutive matches after the Cagliari match, Ménez made his first start since December 2009 in a league match against Catania on 21 February. He capped the return by assisting on the game-winning goal scored by Mirko Vučinić. Ménez finished the campaign by starting eight of the final ten league matches as Roma finished the season in second place and qualified for the UEFA Champions League.

In the 2010–11 season, Ménez began the season as a starter under Ranieri after his successful end to the previous season. Despite being a starter, however, Ranieri continued to undermine Ménez's durability as he consistently substituted the player out in every match he started. On 3 November, Ménez scored his first goal of the campaign in a 3–2 Champions League victory over Swiss club Basel. A week later, he assisted on a Marco Borriello goal in a 3–2 win over Fiorentina. On 13 November, for the first time in the season, Ménez played an entire match after playing in a 1–1 draw with Juventus. In the team's next league match against Udinese, he scored his first league goal and also assisted on a goal in a 2–0 win. After going scoreless in December, on 22 January 2011, Ménez scored the final goal in a 3–0 win over Cagliari. On 16 February, Ménez scored a goal in Roma's first leg of its Champions League first knockout round tie with Shakhtar Donetsk. Five days later, Ranieri resigned from his position as manager and replaced with Vincenzo Montella. Under Montella, Ménez appeared in the manager's first three matches as a substitute. On 13 March, he made his first start under Montella in a league match against Lazio, but was substitute out after 55 minutes. On 23 March, in an interview with French newspaper L'Equipe, Ménez admitted that he was frustrated with his playing time under Montella. The frustration reached its zenith when, on 21 April, Ménez and Montella got into an altercation during a morning training session after Montella reportedly "spent a quarter of an hour berating the France international" for his lack of commitment. Later that night, following the team's Coppa Italia tie with Inter Milan, while leaving the Stadio Olimpico in his vehicle, Ménez was attacked by stone-throwing "thugs", which resulted in his car windshield being smashed.

=== Paris Saint-Germain ===
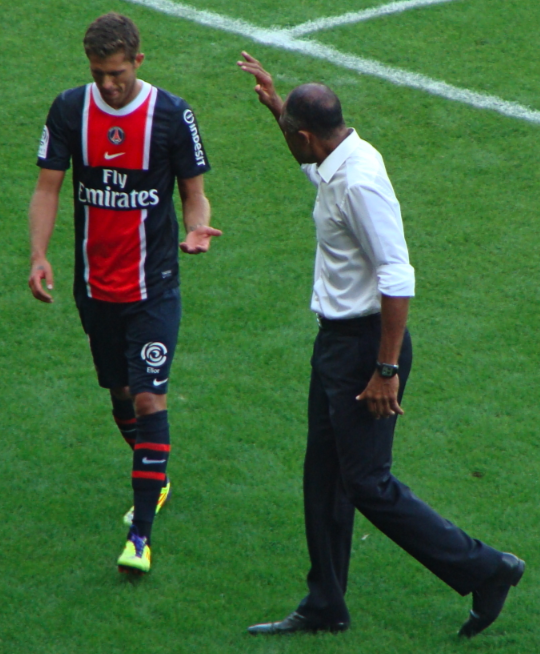
Ménez with manager Antoine Kombouaré in 2011

On 25 July 2011, Paris Saint-Germain confirmed that the club had signed Ménez to a three-year contract. The transfer fee was €8 million plus possible future incentives. He was presented to the media the same day – alongside fellow new signing and international teammate Blaise Matuidi – and was assigned the number 7 shirt. Ménez made his club debut for the team in its 1–0 defeat to the New York Red Bulls at the Emirates Cup. He made his competitive debut for PSG on 6 August 2011 in the team's opening 1–0 league defeat to Lorient. The following week, he assisted on the team's opening goal, scored by Kevin Gameiro, in a 1–1 draw with Rennes. On 18 August 2011, in PSG's first leg UEFA Europa League playoff round tie against Luxembourger club Differdange, Ménez scored the final goal for the team in a 4–0 away win. He also assisted on a goal in the victory. Three days later, he again assisted Gameiro for a goal in a 2–1 win over Valenciennes, helping PSG earn its first league win of the season. On 28 August, Ménez netted his first league goal for the club away to Toulouse; Paris Saint-Germain won the match 3–1.

Under the guidance of coaches Antoine Kombouaré and later Carlo Ancelotti, Ménez enjoyed a strong campaign which saw him deliver seven goals and 12 assists in 33 league appearances for PSG, a career best for him. On 4 December 2011, during a 3–2 home league victory against Auxerre, Ménez scored PSG's 2,000th goal in top-flight football.

In the 2012–13 season, Ménez was used less prolifically in Ligue 1 matches. With two goals and two assists in five European appearances, however, he has been one of his club's main actors in their Champions League efforts, developing a strong understanding on the pitch with new star striker Zlatan Ibrahimović, another former Serie A player.

=== AC Milan ===
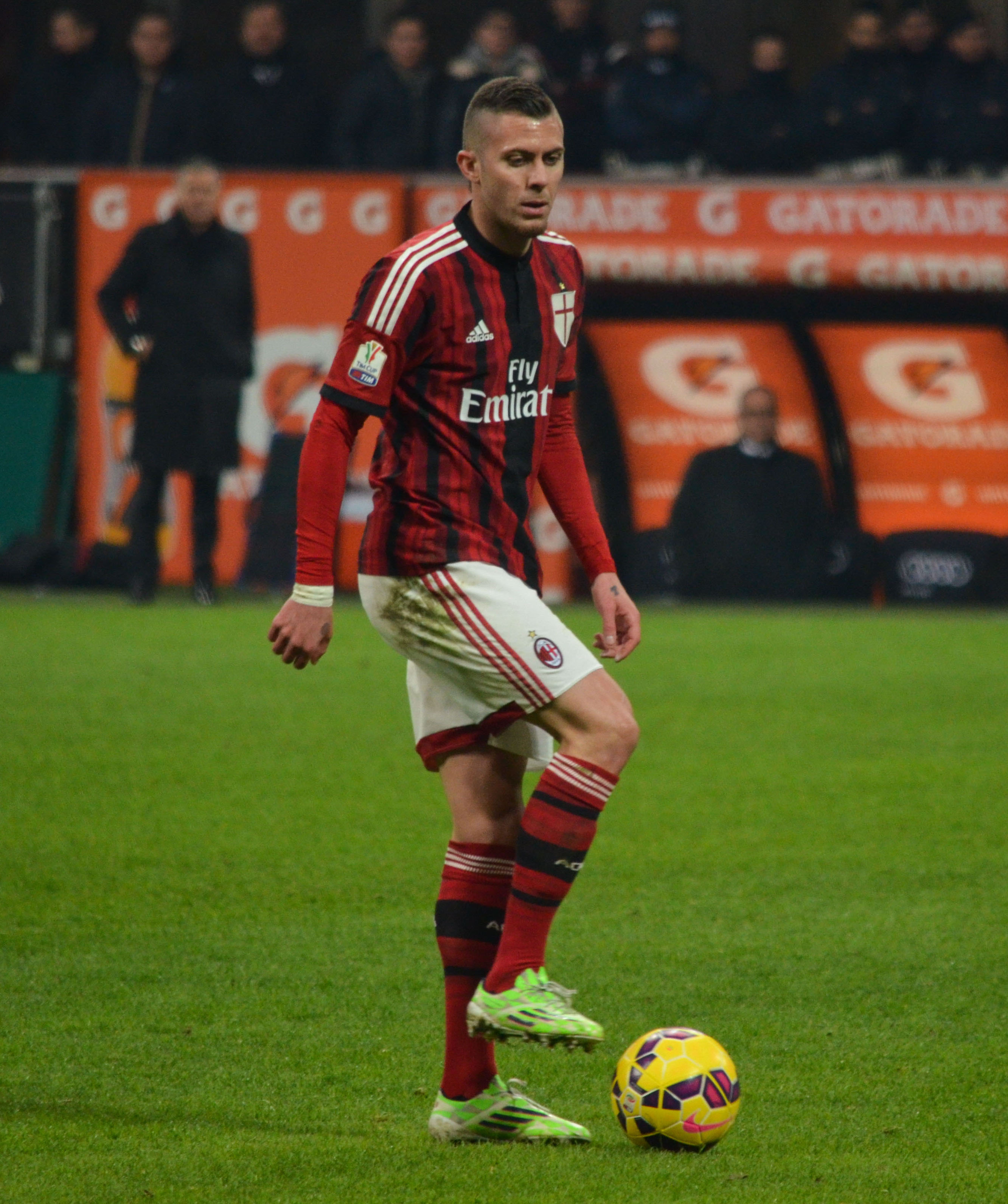
Ménez with AC Milan in 2015.

In June 2014, Italian club AC Milan confirmed that the club had signed Ménez on a three-year contract. On 31 August 2014, Ménez scored a penalty on his debut for Milan against Lazio. He went on to score two goals against Parma helping Milan win the game. His first goal in this game was from a penalty, and the second goal was a beautifully worked backheel finish. On 8 November, Ménez scored a penalty kick and assisted Stephan El Shaarawy's goal as Milan drew Sampdoria 2–2.

On 23 November, Ménez scored a beautiful goal as he calmy converted El Shaarawy's cross in the far net in the Derby della Madonnina against Inter. He then scored two goals and was named man of the match in the next game against Udinese. Ménez also continued his impressive form and scored a beautiful goal as he dribbled past 3 defenders and put it in the net as he helped Milan beat Napoli 2–0. Ménez scored two goals and created an assist in the 3–1 defeat of Parma on 1 February. He followed this with a penalty in a 2–2 draw with Hellas Verona on 7 March and a brace in a 3–1 defeat of Cagliari on 21 March, hitting a career high in goals for a single club (15, surpassing his previous best of 14 for PSG). On 4 March 2015, Ménez scored the winning goal after a long solo run against Palermo in a 2–1 victory, Milan's first away win of 2015. Ménez's season, however, ended poorly; on 29 April 2015, he was sent off for a second bookable offensive during the 3–1 defeat against Genoa and was handed a four-match ban for an insulting gesture, also missing the team's last match against Atalanta due to an injury. Ménez ended his first season at Milan as the club's top scorer, with 34 appearances and 16 goals in all competitions.

In the subsequent summer, Ménez suffered back problems and underwent surgery in Monaco. On 21 August, he was ruled out for a month as further back complications arose. An infection meant he missed the first 26 games of the 2015–16 season and was kept from playing until his return in a 2–1 league win over Genoa on 14 February 2016. On 1 March, he started a match for the first time since April 2015, playing 76 minutes and scoring twice in a 5–0 Coppa Italia defeat of Alessandria, sending Milan to the final for the first time since 2003.

=== Bordeaux ===
On 1 August 2016, Bordeaux and Milan reached an agreement for the transfer of Ménez. On 3 August, two days after signing for the club, he was involved in a gruesome incident in a pre-season match against Lorient. The injury occurred in the second-half when Lorient midfielder Didier Ndong inadvertently stood on Ménez's head, causing the former French international to lose part of his right ear in the process. Ménez had only come on as a substitute in the 62nd minute but had to be taken off a little more than 15 minutes later when the incident happened. Ndong offered his apologies to Ménez for his part in the accident, stating, "I offer my apologies to Jeremy Ménez and Girondins de Bordeaux. I give him my full support for the coming days and hope to see him very quickly on the pitches of Ligue 1."

=== Antalyaspor ===
On 9 June 2017, he joined the Turkish club Antalyaspor.

=== América ===
On 5 January 2018, it was announced Ménez had joined Mexican side Club América. He made his Liga MX debut on 27 January against Atlas. He appeared as a substitute in the 67th minute for Cecilio Domínguez in América's 1–0 win. The following week, Ménez scored his first goal for América in a 5–1 against Lobos BUAP. On 10 February, he scored from the penalty spot to equalise the score in América's 1–1 draw against Tigres UANL. On 2 May, he scored two penalties against Pumas UNAM in the quarterfinals away match, which América would later win 4–1.

On 4 August, during a friendly match against Pachuca, he suffered an anterior cruciate ligament injury ruling him out between 6 and 9 months, leaving him out of the 2019 Torneo Apertura.

On 29 August 2019, it was announced that Ménez and Club América ended their contractual relation on a mutual agreement.

=== Paris FC ===
On 27 September 2019, he signed a one-year contract with French club Paris FC. In June 2020, after the end of the season, Ménez left Paris FC and became a free agent.

=== Reggina ===
On 23 June 2020, Ménez signed a three-year contract with newly-promoted Serie B club Reggina.

=== Bari ===
On 19 July 2023, Ménez joined Serie B side Bari, signing a 1-year deal, with an optional year. On his debut on 18 August, he suffered a season-ending anterior cruciate ligament injury in his right knee.

In March 2024, Ménez departed the club having had his contract terminated by mutual consent.

=== End of career ===
On 28 September 2024, Ménez announces his retirement from football.

== International career ==
=== Youth ===
Ménez has earned caps with all of France's youth teams. He is a member of the group, commonly known as the Génération 1987, that produced current internationals Hatem Ben Arfa, Karim Benzema and Samir Nasri, alongside himself. Ménez made his youth international debut with the under-16 team on 11 December 2002 in a friendly against Greece, playing alongside Nasri and Ben Arfa. In the match, Ménez scored the fifth goal of a 6–1 victory. At the 2003 Aegean Cup in Turkey, he scored goals in three consecutive matches. Ménez scored goals against Ukraine and Israel and netted his final goal in the third-place match against Belgium.

At the Montaigu Tournament, Ménez scored three goals, second-best on the team behind Ben Arfa. He scored a goal in the team's 8–0 win over Gabon in the team's opening group match and, in the following match, scored the opening goal in the team's 3–0 win over Russia. In the team's final group stage match against England, Ménez netted another goal in a 3–1 victory. At a regional tournament in Salerno, Italy, Ménez led the team to the title by scoring a double in the final match against the hosts. He also scored two goals in the group matches against Japan and Finland. Ménez finished the under-16 campaign with 14 appearances and a team-leading 12 goals.

With the under-17 team, Ménez, Ben Arfa, and Nasri were joined by Karim Benzema and tasked with the goal of winning the 2004 UEFA European Under-17 Championship on home soil. Ménez made his debut with the team in the opening match of the season against Sweden. In the Tournio de Val-de-Marne, he scored one goal. France were crowned champions without conceding a goal. At the 2004 UEFA European Under-17 Championship, Ménez contributed to the team's winning the competition by scoring two goals, netting one against Turkey in the group stage and a second in the semi-finals against Portugal. In total with the under-17s, he made 17 appearances and scored 6 goals. Due to increased playing time at his parent club Sochaux, Ménez's stint with the under-18 team was uneventful. Ménez did appear with the team at the 2005 Meridian Cup, scoring five goals in four matches as France were crowned champions.

The foursome of Ben Arfa, Nasri, Benzema and Ménez returned to international play together for under-19 duty. The four were joined by Issiar Dia, Blaise Matuidi and Serge Gakpé with the objective of winning the 2006 UEFA European Under-19 Championship. In the first round of qualification for the tournament, Ménez went scoreless as France advanced through the round undefeated. In the final round of qualification, he scored a double against Bulgaria in a 4–0 win. Despite finishing the round undefeated, however, France were eliminated after being beaten on points by Scotland.

Ménez was absent from the under-21 team during his early eligibility term but made his debut on 25 May 2008 in the team's 2–1 friendly match win over the Netherlands. He went months without a call-up before finally returning to the team ahead of the important two-legged playoff against Germany in qualification for the 2009 UEFA European Under-21 Championship in October 2008. Ménez appeared in both legs as France were defeated 2–1 on aggregate. The 1–0 loss in the second leg eliminated France from the competition and also ended Ménez's under-21 career.

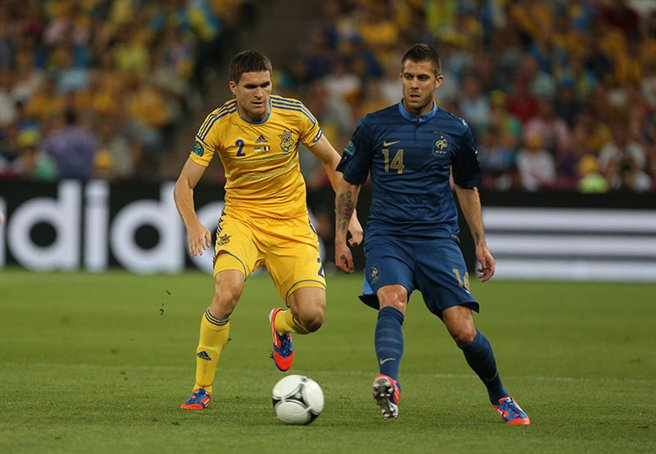
Ménez (right) playing for France against Ukraine at UEFA Euro 2012.

=== Senior ===
On 5 August 2010, Ménez was called up to the senior team for the first time by new manager Laurent Blanc for the team's friendly against Norway on 11 August 2010. He made his international debut in the match starting on the right wing as France were defeated 2–1. On 9 February 2011, Ménez assisted on the only goal, scored by Karim Benzema, in the team's 1–0 win over Brazil at the Stade de France. After appearing regularly in qualifying for UEFA Euro 2012, on 29 May 2012, Ménez was named to the squad to participate in the competition. On 5 June, in the team's final warm-up friendly ahead of the Euro, he scored his first international goal in a 4–0 shutout win over Estonia. At Euro 2012, Ménez made his debut at a senior international competition on 15 June in the team's second group stage match against Ukraine. In the contest, he started and scored France's opening goal in a 2–0 victory.

== Personal life ==
He has two children: a daughter, Maëlla (born 2012) and a son, Menzo (born 2014). Their mother, Émilie Nef Naf is the winner of the third season of reality TV show Secret Story.

== Career statistics ==
=== Club ===
Appearances and goals by club, season and competition
Club	Season	League			National cup (Note: Includes Coupe de France, Coppa Italia, Turkish Cup, Copa MX)		League cup (Note: Includes Coupe de la Ligue)		Europe		Other		Total	
Club	Season	Division	Apps	Goals	Apps	Goals	Apps	Goals	Apps	Goals	Apps	Goals	Apps	Goals
Sochaux	2004–05	Ligue 1	24	4	0	0	2	0	6 (Note: Appearances in UEFA Cup)	0	—		32	4
Sochaux	2005–06	Ligue 1	31	3	0	0	0	0	—		—		31	3
Sochaux	Total		55	7	0	0	2	0	6	0	—		63	7
Monaco	2006–07	Ligue 1	29	7	0	0	2	0	—		—		31	7
Monaco	2007–08	Ligue 1	25	7	2	0	1	0	—		—		28	7
Monaco	2008–09	Ligue 1	3	0	0	0	0	0	—		—		3	0
Monaco	Total		57	14	2	0	3	0	—		—		62	14
Roma	2008–09	Serie A	29	4	0	0	—		3 (Note: Appearances in UEFA Champions League)	0	—		32	4
Roma	2009–10	Serie A	23	1	4	0	—		10 (Note: Appearances in UEFA Europa League)	3	—		37	4
Roma	2010–11	Serie A	32	2	4	0	—		6	2	1 (Note: Appearance in Supercoppa Italiana)	0	43	4
Roma	Total		84	7	8	0	0	0	19	5	1	0	112	12
Paris Saint-Germain	2011–12	Ligue 1	33	7	3	0	1	0	5	2	—		42	9
Paris Saint-Germain	2012–13	Ligue 1	30	5	3	0	2	1	7	2	—		42	8
Paris Saint-Germain	2013–14	Ligue 1	16	2	2	0	4	0	4	0	0	0	26	2
Paris Saint-Germain	Total		79	14	8	0	7	1	16	4	0	0	110	19
AC Milan	2014–15	Serie A	33	16	1	0	—		—		—		34	16
AC Milan	2015–16	Serie A	10	2	2	2	—		—		—		12	4
AC Milan	Total		43	18	3	2	—		—		—		46	20
Bordeaux	2016–17	Ligue 1	26	3	3	0	2	0	—		—		31	3
Antalyaspor	2017–18	Süper Lig	7	0	2	0	—		—		—		9	0
América	2017–18	Liga MX	14	5	—		—		2 (Note: Appearances in CONCACAF Champions League)	0	—		16	5
América	2018–19	Liga MX	3	0	1	0	—		1	0	1	0	6	0
América	2018–19	Liga MX	1	0	—		—		—		—		1	0
América	Total		18	5	1	0	0	0	3	0	1	0	23	5
Paris FC	2019–20	Ligue 2	17	4	1	1	—		—		—		18	5
Reggina	2020–21	Serie B	18	3	0	0	—		—		—		18	3
Reggina	2021–22	Serie B	16	5	1	0	—		—		—		17	5
Reggina	2022–23	Serie B	31	5	1	0	—		—		—		32	5
Reggina	Total		65	13	2	0	—		—		—		67	13
Bari	2023–24	Serie B	10	0	0	0	—		—		—		10	0
Career total			439	83	30	3	14	1	44	9	2	0	553	98

=== International ===
Appearances and goals by national team and year
National team	Year	Apps	Goals
France	2010	2	0
France	2011	7	0
France	2012	12	2
France	2013	3	0
Total		24	2

Scores and results list France's goal tally first, score column indicates score after each Ménez goal.

List of international goals scored by Jérémy Ménez
No.	Date	Venue	Opponent	Score	Result	Competition
1	5 June 2012	MMArena, Le Mans, France	Estonia	4–0	4–0	Friendly
2	15 June 2012	Donbas Arena, Donetsk, Ukraine	Ukraine	1–0	2–0	UEFA Euro 2012

== Honours ==
Paris Saint-Germain

- Ligue 1: 2012–13, 2013–14
- Coupe de la Ligue: 2013–14

América

- Liga MX: Apertura 2018
- Copa MX: Clausura 2019
- Campeón de Campeones: 2019

France U17

- UEFA European Under-17 Championship: 2004
