= Edgar Loué =

Ivorian footballer

Edgard Loué
Personal information
- Full name: Edgard Gnoleba Loué
- Date of birth: December 27, 1983 (age 42)
- Place of birth: Abidjan, Ivory Coast
- Height: 1.85 m (6 ft 1 in)
- Position: Defender

Youth career
- –1999: Africa Sports

Senior career*
Years	Team	Apps	(Gls)
1999–2001	Africa Sports		
2001–2002	MC Oran		
2002–2003	MO Constantine		
2003–2006	Raja Casablanca		
2006–2008	Strasbourg	12	(0)
2008–2009	Espérance		
2009–2010	Al-Nasr Benghazi		
2010–2011	Gabès		
2011–2012	Wydad de Fès		
- * Club domestic league appearances and goals

Edgard Gnoleba Loué (born 27 December 1983) is an Ivorian former professional footballer who played as a defender.

== Career ==
Born in Abidjan, Loué started his career in homeland club Africa Sports, before joining Moroccan side Raja Casablanca. He had a spell in Algeria with MO Constantine in the second division. Then he returned to Morocco to play for Raja Casablanca. In January 2006, he joined French club RC Strasbourg, who were in Ligue 1 at the time, on a four-and-a-half-year deal. After his winter transfer window arrival, Loué Gnoleba integrated quickly into the first team, but ultimately is considered a disappointing acquisition by Racing.

Loué won the 2004 Botola with Raja Casablanca and would win the 2008–09 Tunisian Ligue Professionnelle 1 championship with Espérance Sportive de Tunis.
