= Éric Cubilier =

French footballer (born 1979)

Personal information
- Date of birth: 9 May 1979 (age 47)
- Place of birth: Nice, France
- Height: 1.81 m (5 ft 11 in)
- Position: Defender

Senior career*
Years	Team	Apps	(Gls)
1996–2001	Nice	39	(1)
2001–2006	Monaco	54	(0)
2003–2004	→ PSG (loan)	15	(0)
2004–2005	→ Lens (loan)	31	(0)
2006–2008	Nantes	19	(1)
2007–2008	→ Metz (loan)	22	(0)
2009–2010	Bastia	30	(0)
Total		210	(2)

International career
2014	County of Nice		
- * Club domestic league appearances and goals

Éric Cubilier (born 9 May 1979) is a French former professional footballer who played as a defender. He was a member of the County of Nice national football team at the 2014 ConIFA World Football Cup.
