= Ibrahima Faye =

Senegalese footballer (born 1979)

Personal information
- Date of birth: 22 October 1979 (age 47)
- Place of birth: Thiès, Senegal
- Height: 1.83 m (6 ft 0 in)
- Position: Defender

Youth career
- 1998–1999: Gazélec Ajaccio

Senior career*
Years	Team	Apps	(Gls)
1999–2001	Red Star 93	26	(2)
2001–2004	Gent	68	(0)
2004–2005	Caen	31	(0)
2005–2009	Troyes	115	(5)
2009–2011	Lapta		
2011	UJA Alfortville	23	(1)
2011–2012	Paris FC	33	(3)
2012–2013	RE Bertrix	23	(0)

International career
2003–2008	Senegal	28	(1)

Managerial career
- 2017–?: OFC Charleville
- * Club domestic league appearances and goals

Ibrahima Faye (born 22 October 1979) is a Senegalese former professional footballer who played as a defender.

== Career ==
Faye and was born in Pout, a small village near the city of Thiès in Senegal. Moving to France to pursue his footballing career, he completed his youth development at Gazélec Ajaccio before joining Red Star Saint-Ouen.

After a season in Ligue 2 and a season in Championnat National with Red Star he left to join Belgian top-flight club Gent where he spent three seasons as a first-team regular.

Faye moved back to France in 2004 with Caen. He played 30 league games as Caen suffered relegation to Ligue 2. Shortly into the following season, he joined Troyes, becoming a fixture in the team.

In August 2009 Faye trialled with Stoke City of the English Premiership. In October 2009, he also had a trial with Ipswich Town. After making a good impression playing for the club's reserves he was in negotiations for a contract.

In August 2012, Faye joined RE Bertrix of the Belgian third tier.

== Post-playing career ==
In 2017, Faye became manager at French lower-league side OFC Charleville.
