= Marko Muslin =

French footballer (born 1985)

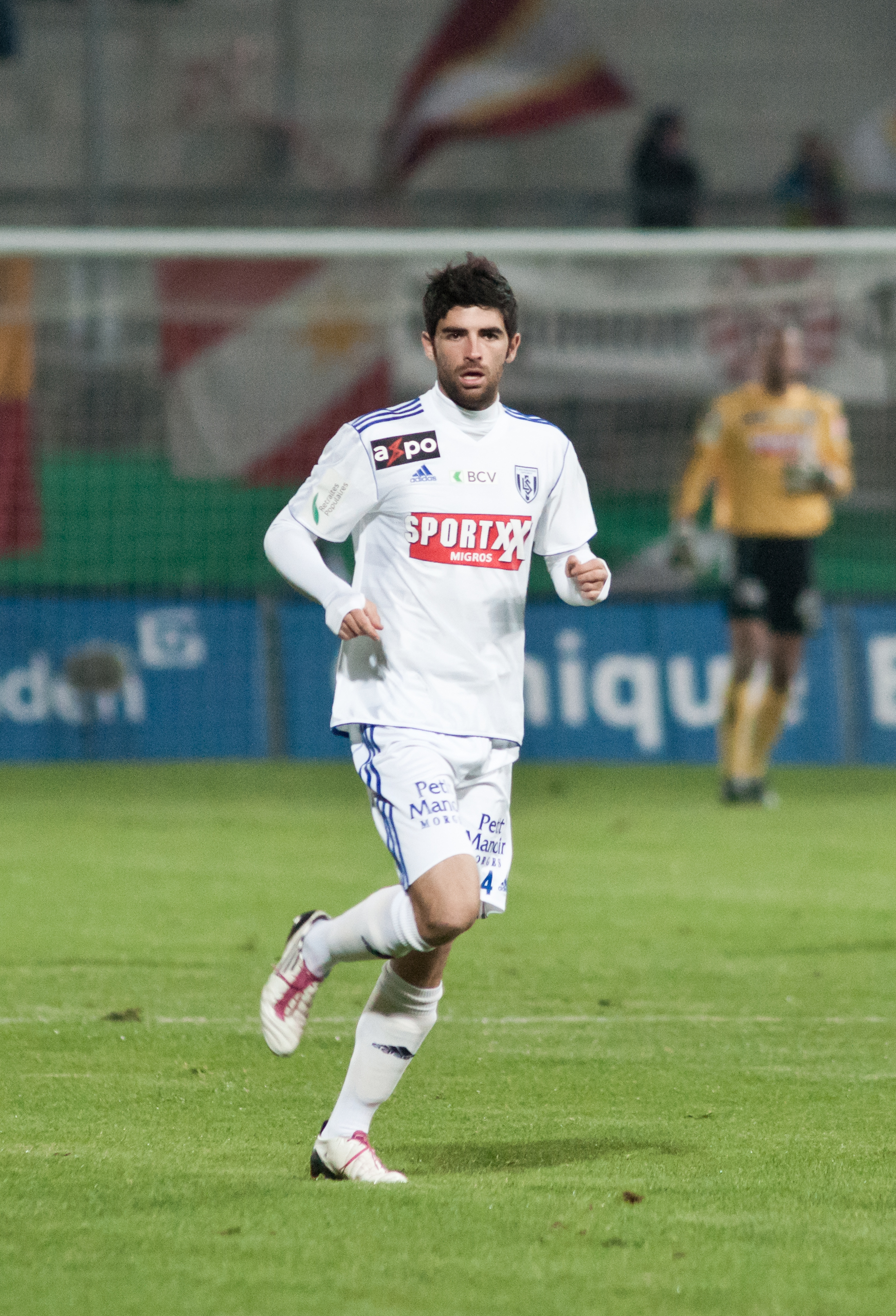

Personal information
- Date of birth: 17 June 1985 (age 41)
- Place of birth: Brest, France
- Height: 1.85 m (6 ft 1 in)
- Positions: Centre back; midfielder

Youth career
- Brest

Senior career*
Years	Team	Apps	(Gls)
2001–2003	Nice B	20	(0)
2003–2004	Red Star Belgrade	17	(0)
2004	→ Hajduk Belgrade (loan)	11	(1)
2004–2006	AS Monaco	2	(0)
2006	→ Willem II (loan)	5	(0)
2006–2007	Lierse	26	(1)
2008	Lokomotiv Sofia	7	(0)
2009–2011	Wil	73	(8)
2011–2012	Lausanne-Sport	22	(0)
2012–2015	Wil	104	(11)
2015–2017	Wohlen	66	(2)
2017–2019	Wil	23	(1)
2018–2019	→ Wohlen (loan)	23	(3)
2019–2021	Wohlen	7	(1)
- * Club domestic league appearances and goals as of 22:06, 22 September 2019 (UTC)

Marko Muslin (born 17 June 1985) is a French retired footballer who last played for Swiss side FC Wohlen.

== Career ==
Marko Muslin started his career at Stade Brest. He later signed with OGC Nice in 2001.

He won the 2003–04 First League of Serbia and Montenegro and Serbia and Montenegro Cup trophies with Red Star Belgrade, however, he played with Red Star only the first half of the season, during the winter-break he was loaned to FK Hajduk Beograd where he played the rest of the season.

In July 2004, he joined French Ligue 1 side AS Monaco FC. In 2005, he was loaned out to Dutch side Willem II.

After playing with Lierse S.K. in the Belgian Pro League, in February 2008 Muslin signed on free transfer with Bulgarian club Lokomotiv Sofia. He left the club after 1 year and joined FC Wil 1900. In the summer of 2011 he moved to FC Lausanne-Sport, however his stay was short as he returned to Wil the following season.

In July 2015, Muslin signed a two-year contract with FC Wohlen.

In September 2018, Muslin returned to FC Wohlen on a season-long loan deal from FC Wil. Muslin stayed at the club ahead of the 2019/20 season.

== Personal life ==
His father Slavoljub is a Serbian football manager and a former player.
