= Olivier Veigneau =

French footballer (born 1985)

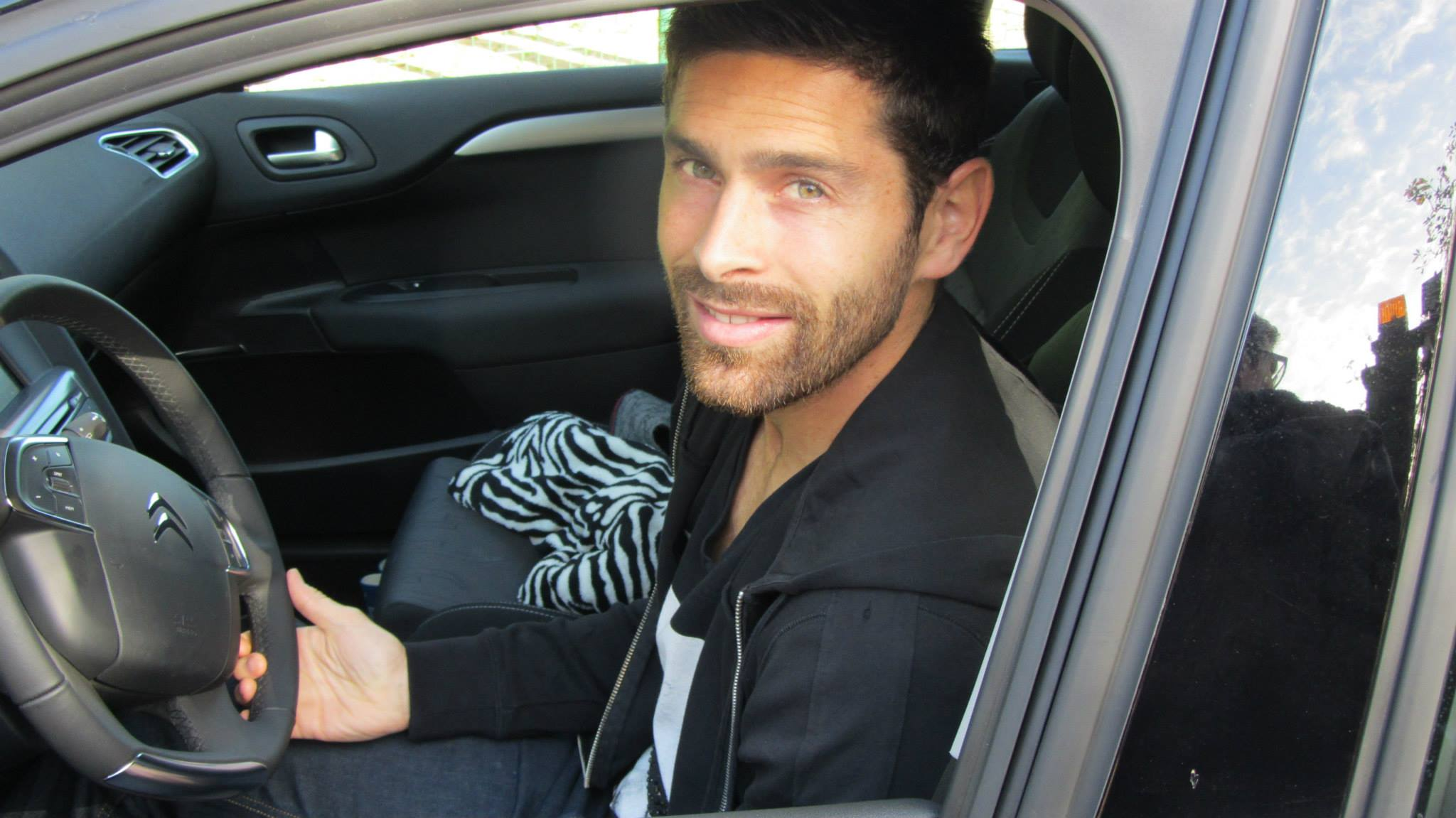

Personal information
- Full name: Olivier Veigneau
- Date of birth: 16 July 1985 (age 41)
- Place of birth: Suresnes, Hauts-de-Seine, France
- Height: 1.74 m (5 ft 8 1/2 in)
- Position: Left-back

Youth career
- 2001–2005: Monaco

Senior career*
Years	Team	Apps	(Gls)
2005–2007	Monaco	21	(1)
2006–2007	→ OGC Nice (loan)	19	(0)
2008–2011	MSV Duisburg	99	(0)
2011–2015	Nantes	117	(0)
2015–2020	Kasımpaşa	122	(0)
2020–2021	Le Mans	20	(0)

International career^{‡}
2004	France U-19	1	(0)
2006	France U-21	1	(0)
- * Club domestic league appearances and goals as of 15 May 2021 ‡ National team caps and goals as of 20 December 2015

Olivier Veigneau (born 16 July 1985) is a French professional footballer who plays as a left-back.
