= Lucas Bernardi =

Argentine footballer

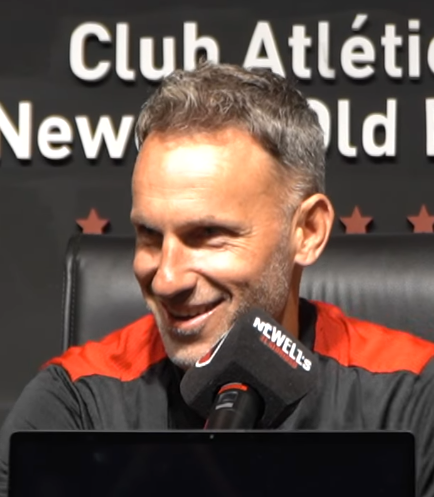
- Bernardi in 2025

Personal information
- Full name: Lucas Ademar Bernardi
- Date of birth: 27 September 1977 (age 49)
- Place of birth: Rosario, Argentina
- Height: 1.73 m (5 ft 8 in)
- Position: Defensive midfielder

Team information
- Current team: Newell's Old Boys (reserves manager)

Senior career*
Years	Team	Apps	(Gls)
1998–2000	Newell's Old Boys	75	(3)
2000–2001	Marseille	8	(0)
2001–2008	Monaco	178	(4)
2008–2014	Newell's Old Boys	198	(3)
Total		459	(10)

International career
2004–2005	Argentina	6	(0)

Managerial career
- 2015–2016: Newell's Old Boys
- 2016: Arsenal de Sarandí
- 2017: Godoy Cruz
- 2017–2018: Estudiantes
- 2018: Belgrano
- 2019: Godoy Cruz
- 2025–: Newell's Old Boys (reserves)
- 2025: Newell's Old Boys (caretaker)
- 2026: Newell's Old Boys (caretaker)
- * Club domestic league appearances and goals

Lucas Ademar Bernardi (born 27 September 1977) is an Argentine former professional football manager and former player who played as a defensive midfielder. He is the current manager of Newell's Old Boys' reserve team.

== Club career ==
Bernardi began his playing career with Newell's Old Boys before joining French team Olympique de Marseille in 2001. After one season with Marseille he joined AS Monaco where he played over 200 games for the club. He was part of the team that reached the final of the 2003–04 UEFA Champions League. In 2009, he returned to Argentina to rejoin Newell's.

== International career ==
Bernardi made his international debut for Argentina against Japan in 2004.

== Coaching career ==
On 3 March 2019, Bernardi was appointed as manager of Godoy Cruz.

== Career statistics ==
=== Club ===
Appearances and goals by club, season and competition
Club	Season	League			National cup		League cup		Continental		Other		Total	
Club	Season	Division	Apps	Goals	Apps	Goals	Apps	Goals	Apps	Goals	Apps	Goals	Apps	Goals
Newell's Old Boys	1997–98	Primera División					–		–		–			
Newell's Old Boys	1998–99	Primera División	23	0			–		–		–		23	0
Newell's Old Boys	1999–2000	Primera División	34	2			–		–		–		34	2
Newell's Old Boys	2000–01	Primera División	17	1			–		–		–		17	1
Newell's Old Boys	Total		74	3			0	0	0	0	0	0	74	3
Marseille	2000–01	Ligue 1	8	0			0	0	–		–		8	0
Monaco	2001–02	Ligue 1	23	0			0	0	–		–		23	0
Monaco	2002–03	Ligue 1	31	0			4	0	–		–		35	0
Monaco	2003–04	Ligue 1	33	2			0	0	12	0	–		45	2
Monaco	2004–05	Ligue 1	24	1			1	0	5	0	–		30	1
Monaco	2005–06	Ligue 1	32	0			3	0	10	0	–		45	0
Monaco	2006–07	Ligue 1	16	0			2	0	–		–		18	0
Monaco	2007–08	Ligue 1	19	0			1	0	–		–		20	0
Monaco	Total		178	3			11	0	27	0	0	0	216	3
Newell's Old Boys	2008–09	Primera División	18	0			–		–		–		0	0
Newell's Old Boys	2009–10	Primera División	35	2			–		2	0	–		0	0
Newell's Old Boys	2010–11	Primera División	24	0			–		6	0	–		0	0
Newell's Old Boys	2011–12	Primera División	37	0	1	0	–		–		–		0	0
Newell's Old Boys	2012–13	Primera División	30	0	1	0	–		8	0	–		0	0
Newell's Old Boys	2013–14	Primera División	35	1	1	0	–		6	1	–		0	0
Newell's Old Boys	2014	Primera División	19	0	0	0	–		–		–		0	0
Newell's Old Boys	Total		198	3	3	0	0	0	22	1	0	0	223	4
Career total			458	9	3	0	11	0	49	1	0	0	521	10

=== International ===
Appearances and goals by national team and year
National team	Year	Apps	Goals
Argentina
Argentina	2004	1	0
Argentina	2005	5	0
Total		6	0

== Managerial statistics ==
As of 27 December 2016.

Team	Nat	From	To	Record				
Team	Nat	From	To	G	W	D	L	Win %
Newell's Old Boys	Argentina	July 2015	February 2016	21	6	5	10	28.57
Arsenal de Sarandí	Argentina	November 2016	December 2016	5	1	2	2	20.00
Godoy Cruz	Argentina	December 2016	present	0	0	0	0	—
Total				26	7	7	12	26.92

== Honours ==
Monaco

- Coupe de la Ligue 2002–03
- UEFA Champions League runner-up: 2003–04

Newell's Old Boys

- Argentine Primera División 2012–13
