= Sébastien Grax =

French footballer (born 1984)

Personal information
- Date of birth: 23 June 1984 (age 42)
- Place of birth: Le Creusot, France
- Height: 1.78 m (5 ft 10 in)
- Position: Striker

Youth career
- 1992–1993: Montauban
- 1993–1998: Draguignan
- 1998–2001: Monaco

Senior career*
Years	Team	Apps	(Gls)
2001–2007	Monaco	8	(0)
2004–2006	→ Troyes (loan)	66	(25)
2006–2007	→ Sochaux (loan)	13	(5)
2007–2008	Sochaux	12	(1)
2008–2010	Saint-Étienne	12	(0)
2009–2010	→ Guingamp (loan)	24	(3)
2011–2014	Troyes	48	(10)
Total		183	(44)

International career
2004–2005	France U21	2	(0)
- * Club domestic league appearances and goals

Sébastien Grax (born 23 June 1984) is a French former professional footballer who played as a striker.

== Career ==
Grax started his career at Monaco in 2001 where he played four matches in three years. He was then loaned out to Troyes in 2004 where he contributed 16 goals in 35 matches to the club's promotion to Ligue 1. In Ligue, he scored nine goals for the club. His most famous goal came against Lille in 2005 when Troyes were newly promoted and Lille were in the UEFA Champions League.

Grax spent 1.5 seasons at Sochaux, scoring 6 goals in 25 league appearances. While at Sochaux he played as they won the 2007 Coupe de France Final.

In June 2008, Grax joined Saint-Étienne.

Grax had a trial with Championship side Crystal Palace in August 2010 followed by another with Preston North End in December.
