= David Gigliotti =

French footballer (born 1985)

Personal information
- Date of birth: May 30, 1985 (age 41)
- Place of birth: Martigues, France
- Height: 1.76 m (5 ft 9 1/2 in)
- Position: Forward

Team information
- Current team: GS Consolat

Youth career
- 1992–1999: Istres
- 1999–2004: Monaco

Senior career*
Years	Team	Apps	(Gls)
2004–2007	Monaco	21	(3)
2006–2007	→ Troyes (loan)	29	(9)
2007–2010	Saint-Étienne	33	(3)
2010	Le Havre	9	(0)
2010–2011	Nîmes	28	(7)
2011–2012	Arles-Avignon	4	(0)
2012–2013	Ajaccio	1	(0)
2014–2016	GS Consolat	64	(11)
2016	Marignane Gignac	4	(4)
2016	Toulon	2	(0)
2017–	GS Consolat	2	(0)

International career
2004–2006	France U-18	5	(3)
2005	France U-21	12	(6)
- * Club domestic league appearances and goals as of 12:29, 16 October 2015 (UTC)

David Gigliotti (born 30 May 1985) is a French footballer who currently plays for GS Consolat in the Championnat National.

== International career ==
He participated in the 2005 and 2006 Toulon Tournaments, earning the award of leading goalscorer (with 3 goals) in the latter tournament. He is also notorious for being a poor striker on fifa and in Abu Ogogo's shadow at all times.

== Personal life ==
David's brother, Guillaume Gigliotti, is also a professional footballer. He is of Argentine descent through his father.
