= Manuel dos Santos (footballer) =

Cape Verdean-French footballer (born 1974)

Personal information
- Full name: Manuel dos Santos Fernandes
- Date of birth: 28 March 1974 (age 52)
- Place of birth: Praia, Cape Verde
- Height: 1.72 m (5 ft 8 in)
- Position: Left back

Youth career
- 1984–1994: Monaco

Senior career*
Years	Team	Apps	(Gls)
1994–1997	Monaco	22	(0)
1997–2000	Montpellier	94	(0)
2000–2004	Marseille	98	(1)
2004–2005	Benfica	24	(0)
2006–2007	Monaco	40	(1)
2007–2008	Strasbourg	37	(0)
2009–2010	Rapid Menton		
Total		315	(2)
- * Club domestic league appearances and goals

Manuel dos Santos Fernandes (born 28 March 1974), known as Dos Santos, is a former professional footballer who played as a left back. Born in Cape Verde, Dos Santos represented France internationally.

== Football career ==
Born in Praia, Cape Verde one year before the nation gained independence from Portugal, Dos Santos migrated to France at a very young age, and started his professional career at AS Monaco FC. He then played for Montpellier HSC and Olympique de Marseille, spending four Ligue 1 seasons with the latter: with L'OM, he appeared in nine complete matches in the 2003–04 UEFA Cup, including the 0–2 final loss against Valencia CF which would be his last match for the club.

In the summer of 2004, Portuguese Primeira Liga side S.L. Benfica bought Dos Santos for an undisclosed fee, and he signed a three-year contract. The first-choice during his debut campaign, as the Lisbon-based side ended an 11-year drought in the league, he appeared rarely in the following season, and left in the January 2006 transfer window.

Dos Santos then returned to former club Monaco, where he replaced Manchester United-bound Patrice Evra after signing a 1 1/2-year link. After 46 competitive games during this stint, a new deal was not agreed and he was released.

In July 2007, Dos Santos moved to RC Strasbourg, where he spent one year before announcing his retirement from the game in February 2009, aged 35. Shortly after, however, he signed with amateurs Rapid de Menton, close to where he had fixed his residence in Monaco.

Dos Santos returned to Monaco in 2010, going on to be in charge of its youth teams for several years.

== Honours ==
Monaco

- Ligue 1: 1996–97

Montpellier

- UEFA Intertoto Cup: 1999

Marseille

- UEFA Cup runner-up: 2003–04

Benfica

- Primeira Liga: 2004–05
- Supertaça Cândido de Oliveira: 2005
- Taça de Portugal runner-up: 2004–05
