= Arnaud Lescure =

French footballer (born 1986)

Personal information
- Date of birth: 13 February 1986 (age 40)
- Place of birth: Auch, France
- Height: 1.81 m (5 ft 11 1/2 in)
- Position: Defender

Team information
- Current team: Balma SC

Youth career
- 2000–2001: CFP Castelmaurou
- 2001–2005: AS Monaco

Senior career*
Years	Team	Apps	(Gls)
2005–2009	AS Monaco	2	(0)
2006–2007	→ Toulon (loan)	28	(0)
2008–2009	→ Rodez AF (loan)	14	(1)
2009–	Balma SC		
- * Club domestic league appearances and goals as of 11:39, 4 July 2009 (UTC)

Arnaud Lescure (born 13 February 1986) is a French footballer who plays Championnat de France amateur for Balma SC. While at Monaco, Lescure spent loan spells at Toulon and Rodez AF.
