= 2003–04 AS Monaco FC season =

AS Monaco
2003–04 season
- President: Pierre Svara
- Head coach: Didier Deschamps
- Stadium: Stade Louis II
- Ligue 1: 3rd
- Coupe de France: Quarter-finals
- Coupe de la Ligue: Round of 16
- UEFA Champions League: Runners-up
- Top goalscorer: League: Ludovic Giuly (13); All: Fernando Morientes (22)
- Highest home attendance: 16,560 (vs. Marseille, 9 May)
- Lowest home attendance: 6,903 (vs. Toulouse, 27 September)
Home colours	Away colours	Third colours

The 2003–04 season was AS Monaco FC's 47th season in Ligue 1. They finished third in Ligue 1, were knocked out of the Coupe de la Ligue by Marseille at the Round of 32, knocked out of the Coupe de France by Châteauroux at the quarter-finals and reached the final of the UEFA Champions League where they were defeated by Porto.

== Season summary ==
The season saw remarkable success on the field, given the club's financial strife. The team, coached by former France national team captain Didier Deschamps and featuring stalwarts such as Fernando Morientes, Ludovic Giuly, Jérôme Rothen and Dado Pršo, finished third in Ligue 1 and enjoyed a remarkable run to the final of the UEFA Champions League, beating Real Madrid and Chelsea along the way. However, despite the on-field success, the 2003–04 season was the club's worst financial year in its history. Within 12 months, Deschamps had left as coach and Svara had been replaced by Michel Pastor.

Monaco were clear outsiders to progress in the Champions League, but defeated tournament favourites like Real Madrid and Chelsea to face another unfancied side, Porto, in the final. Monaco were comprehensively beaten 3–0 by José Mourinho's side, but that did not dampen Monaco's achievement of having defied their underdog status to come within 90 minutes of club football's greatest prize.

Spanish striker Fernando Morientes (signed on loan from Real Madrid) was Monaco's top goalscorer with 22 goals in all competitions.

== Squad ==
Note: Flags indicate national team as defined under FIFA eligibility rules; some limited exceptions apply. Players may hold more than one non-FIFA nationality.

No.	Pos.	Nation	Player
1	GK	FRA	Stéphane Porato
3	DF	FRA	Patrice Evra (Note: Evra was born in Dakar, Senegal.)
4	DF	ARG	Hugo Ibarra (on loan from Porto)
6	MF	CZE	Jaroslav Plašil
7	MF	ARG	Lucas Bernardi
8	MF	FRA	Ludovic Giuly (captain)
9	FW	CRO	Dado Pršo
10	FW	ESP	Fernando Morientes (on loan from Real Madrid)
12	DF	ITA	Joseph Dayo Oshadogan
14	MF	FRA	Édouard Cissé (on loan from Paris Saint-Germain)
15	MF	GRE	Akis Zikos
16	GK	FRA	André Biancarelli
18	FW	COD	Shabani Nonda (Note: Nonda was born in Bujumbura, Burundi.)
19	DF	FRA	Sébastien Squillaci
20	DF	FRA	Arnaud Lescure
21	MF	FRA	Nicolas Hislen

No.	Pos.	Nation	Player
22	FW	FRA	Laurent Lanteri
24	FW	TOG	Emmanuel Adebayor
25	MF	FRA	Jérôme Rothen
27	DF	FRA	Julien Rodriguez
28	DF	POR	Marco Ramos (Note: Ramos was born in Levallois-Perret, France.)
29	GK	SEN	Tony Sylva
30	GK	ITA	Flavio Roma
31	FW	FRA	Sébastien Grax
32	DF	FRA	Gaël Givet
33	FW	FRA	Nicolas Raynier
34	MF	FRA	Jimmy Juan
35	MF	NOR	Hassan El Fakiri (Note: El Fakiri was born in Temsamane, Morocco.)
38	MF	FRA	Laurent Mohellebi
39	DF	FRA	Jim Ablancourt
41	FW	FRA	Nicolas Maurice-Belay

=== Out on loan ===
Note: Flags indicate national team as defined under FIFA eligibility rules; some limited exceptions apply. Players may hold more than one non-FIFA nationality.

No.	Pos.	Nation	Player
26	FW	SEN	Souleymane Camara (at Guingamp)
37	MF	FRA	Sébastien Carole (at West Ham United)

No.	Pos.	Nation	Player
—	MF	MLI	Djibril Sidibé (at Châteauroux)

== Transfers ==
In: Note: Flags indicate national team as defined under FIFA eligibility rules; some limited exceptions apply. Players may hold more than one non-FIFA nationality.

No.	Pos.	Nation	Player
1	GK	FRA	Stéphane Porato (loan return from (France) Créteil-Lusitanos)
4	DF	ARG	Hugo Ibarra (loan from (Portugal) Porto)
10	FW	ESP	Fernando Morientes (loan from (Spain) Real Madrid)
12	DF	ITA	Joseph Dayo Oshadogan (from (Italy) Cosenza)
14	MF	FRA	Édouard Cissé (loan from (France) Paris Saint-Germain)
24	FW	TOG	Emmanuel Adebayor (from (France) Metz)

Out: Note: Flags indicate national team as defined under FIFA eligibility rules; some limited exceptions apply. Players may hold more than one non-FIFA nationality.

No.	Pos.	Nation	Player
4	DF	MEX	Rafael Márquez (to (Spain) Barcelona)
10	MF	ARG	Marcelo Gallardo (to (Argentina) River Plate)
11	FW	ITA	Marco Simone (to (France) Nice)
20	FW	EGY	Mohamed Mazhar (to (France) Châteauroux)
26	FW	SEN	Souleymane Camara (loan to (France) Guingamp)
37	MF	FRA	Sébastien Carole (loan to (England) West Ham United)

== Competitions ==
=== Ligue 1 ===
==== League table ====
Pos	Team	Pld	W	D	L	GF	GA	GD	Pts	Qualification or relegation
1	Lyon (C)	38	24	7	7	64	26	+38	79	Qualification to Champions League group stage
2	Paris Saint-Germain	38	22	10	6	50	28	+22	76	Qualification to Champions League group stage
3	Monaco	38	21	12	5	59	30	+29	75	Qualification to Champions League third qualifying round
4	Auxerre	38	19	8	11	60	34	+26	65	Qualification to UEFA Cup first round
5	Sochaux	38	18	9	11	54	42	+12	63	Qualification to UEFA Cup first round

Source: Ligue 1
Rules for classification: 1) points; 2) goal difference; 3) number of goals scored.
(C) Champions

==== Results summary ====
Overall								Home						Away					
Pld	W	D	L	GF	GA	GD	Pts	W	D	L	GF	GA	GD	W	D	L	GF	GA	GD
38	21	12	5	59	30	+29	75	11	5	3	35	16	+19	10	7	2	24	14	+10

Last updated: 8 September 2015.
Source: Competitive matches

==== Results by round ====
Round	1	2	3	4	5	6	7	8	9	10	11	12	13	14	15	16	17	18	19	20	21	22	23	24	25	26	27	28	29	30	31	32	33	34	35	36	37	38
Ground	H	A	H	A	H	A	A	H	A	H	A	H	A	H	A	H	A	H	A	H	A	H	A	H	H	A	H	A	H	A	H	A	H	A	H	A	H	A
Result	W	L	W	W	W	D	W	W	W	D	D	W	W	W	W	D	W	W	L	W	D	D	W	L	W	D	W	D	D	W	D	D	L	W	W	D	L	W
Position	1	11	5	2	1	2	1	1	1	1	1	1	1	1	1	1	1	1	1	1	1	1	1	1	1	1	1	1	2	2	1	2	3	2	2	2	3	3

Source: Ligue 1
A = Away; H = Home; W = Win; D = Draw; L = Loss

==== Matches ====
2 August 2003 1	AS Monaco	2–0	Bordeaux	Fontvieille
17:15 CEST (UTC+2)	Nonda 31', 56' (pen.)	Report		Stadium: Stade Louis II; Attendance: 13,448; Referee: Bertrand Layec

9 August 2003 2	Lyon	3–1	AS Monaco	Lyon
20:00 CEST (UTC+2)	Squillaci 16' (o.g.); Essien 26'; Rodriguez 44' (o.g.)	Report	Nonda 56'	Stadium: Stade de Gerland; Attendance: 39,726; Referee: Damien Ledentu

16 August 2003 3	AS Monaco	2–0	Bastia	Fontvieille
20:00 CEST (UTC+2)	Adebayor 38'; Zikos 44'	Report		Stadium: Stade Louis II; Attendance: 11,595; Referee: Pascal Viléo

24 August 2003 4	Paris Saint-Germain	2–4	AS Monaco	Paris
20:45 CEST (UTC+2)	Pauleta 14'; Reinaldo 49'	Report	Giuly 35', 90'; Adebayor 37'; Squillaci 56'	Stadium: Parc des Princes; Attendance: 36,527; Referee: Jean-Paul Chaudre

31 August 2003 5	AS Monaco	1–0	Metz	Fontvieille
18:30 CEST (UTC+2)	Squillaci 37'	Report		Stadium: Stade Louis II; Attendance: 8,053; Referee: Hervé Piccirillo

13 September 2003 6	Lille	1–1	AS Monaco	Villeneuve d'Ascq
20:00 CEST (UTC+2)	Manchev 75'	Report	Giuly 44'	Stadium: Stadium Nord de Villeneuve d'Ascq; Attendance: 18,856; Referee: Bruno Derrien

21 September 2003 7	Montpellier	1–2	AS Monaco	Montpellier
18:30 CEST (UTC+2)	Laigle 26'	Report	Adebayor 18'; Giuly 74'	Stadium: Stade de la Mosson; Attendance: 13,870; Referee: Stéphane Bré

27 September 2003 8	AS Monaco	3–0	Toulouse	Fontvieille
20:00 CEST (UTC+2)	Adebayor 11'; Cissé 28'; Pršo 49'	Report		Stadium: Stade Louis II; Attendance: 6,903; Referee: Stéphane Lannoy

4 October 2003 9	Guingamp	1–2	AS Monaco	Guingamp
20:00 CEST (UTC+2)	Goussé 52'	Report	Giuly 16', 26'	Stadium: Stade du Roudourou; Attendance: 13,206; Referee: Laurent Duhamel

18 October 2003 10	AS Monaco	1–1	Auxerre	Fontvieille
17:30 CEST (UTC+2)	Giuly 77'	Report	Kalou 6'	Stadium: Stade Louis II; Attendance: 8,804; Referee: Philippe Kalt

26 October 2003 11	Sochaux	1–1	AS Monaco	Montbéliard
20:45 CET (UTC+1)	Frau 67'	Report	Morientes 21'	Stadium: Stade Auguste Bonal; Attendance: 19,190; Referee: Thierry Auriac

1 November 2003 12	AS Monaco	4–2	Le Mans	Fontvieille
20:00 CET (UTC+1)	Morientes 5'; Cousin 21' (o.g.); Squillaci 68'; Molefe 84' (o.g.)	Report	Cousin 8'; L. Peyrelade 10'	Stadium: Stade Louis II; Attendance: 6,951; Referee: Jean-Marc Bonnin

9 November 2003 13	Ajaccio	0–1	AS Monaco	Ajaccio
18:00 CET (UTC+1)		Report	Pršo 81'	Stadium: Stade François Coty; Attendance: 3,886; Referee: Bruno Derrien

22 November 2003 14	AS Monaco	2–0	Lens	Fontvieille
17:15 CET (UTC+1)	Giuly 58'; Morientes 67'	Report		Stadium: Stade Louis II; Attendance: 9,042; Referee: Stéphane Bré

29 November 2003 15	Nantes	0–1	AS Monaco	Nantes
20:00 CET (UTC+1)		Report	Bernardi 76'	Stadium: Stade de la Beaujoire; Attendance: 36,465; Referee: Philippe Kalt

5 December 2003 17	Marseille	1–2	AS Monaco	Marseille
21:00 CET (UTC+1)	Mido 43'	Report	Squillaci 58'; Giuly 66'	Stadium: Stade Vélodrome; Attendance: 52,265; Referee: Éric Poulat

14 December 2003 18	AS Monaco	2–0	Strasbourg	Fontvieille
20:45 CET (UTC+1)	Pršo 42', 74'	Report		Stadium: Stade Louis II; Attendance: 7,549; Referee: Bruno Ruffray

20 December 2003 19	Rennes	1–0	AS Monaco	Rennes
20:00 CET (UTC+1)	Barbosa 47'	Report		Stadium: Stade de la Route de Lorient; Attendance: 18,633; Referee: Damien Ledentu

9 January 2004 20	AS Monaco	3–0	Lyon	Fontvieille
21:00 CET (UTC+1)	Giuly 33', 89' (pen.); Morientes 47'	Report		Stadium: Stade Louis II; Attendance: 15,674; Referee: René Temmink

17 January 2004 21	Bastia	0–0	AS Monaco	Furiani
17:15 CET (UTC+1)		Report		Stadium: Stade Armand Cesari; Attendance: 6,068; Referee: Éric Poulat

21 January 2004 16	AS Monaco	1–1	Nice	Fontvieille
18:00 CET (UTC+1)	Morientes 40'	Report	D. Meslin 90' (pen.)	Stadium: Stade Louis II; Attendance: 14,391; Referee: Stéphane Bré

30 January 2004 22	AS Monaco	1–1	Paris Saint-Germain	Fontvieille
21:00 CET (UTC+1)	Squillaci 26'	Report	Heinze 31'	Stadium: Stade Louis II; Attendance: 16,022; Referee: Bertrand Layec

7 February 2004 23	Metz	0–2	AS Monaco	Metz
20:00 CET (UTC+1)		Report	Plašil 38'; Givet 51'	Stadium: Stade Saint-Symphorien; Attendance: 18,891; Referee: Pascal Garibian

14 February 2004 24	AS Monaco	0–1	Lille	Fontvieille
20:00 CET (UTC+1)		Report	Moussilou 76'	Stadium: Stade Louis II; Attendance: 8,181; Referee: Hervé Piccirillo

20 February 2004 25	AS Monaco	4–0	Montpellier	Fontvieille
20:00 CET (UTC+1)	Adebayor 47', 56', 71'; Morientes 48'	Report		Stadium: Stade Louis II; Attendance: 7,553; Referee: Stéphane Moulin

28 February 2004 26	Toulouse	1–1	AS Monaco	Toulouse
20:00 CET (UTC+1)	Didot 47'	Report	Givet 72'	Stadium: Stadium Municipal; Attendance: 30,211; Referee: Stéphane Bré

5 March 2004 27	AS Monaco	3–1	Guingamp	Fontvieille
20:00 CET (UTC+1)	Morientes 25', 38'; Pršo 28' (pen.)	Report	Dagano 19'	Stadium: Stade Louis II; Attendance: 7,173; Referee: Pascal Viléo

14 March 2004 28	Auxerre	0–0	AS Monaco	Auxerre
20:45 CEST (UTC+2)		Report		Stadium: Stade de l'Abbé-Deschamps; Attendance: 16,215; Referee: Laurent Duhamel

20 March 2004 29	AS Monaco	1–1	Sochaux	Fontvieille
20:00 CEST (UTC+2)	Morientes 57'	Report	Mathieu 89'	Stadium: Stade Louis II; Attendance: 10,448; Referee: Bruno Derrien

27 March 2004 30	Le Mans	0–1	AS Monaco	Le Mans
20:00 CEST (UTC+2)		Report	Pršo 49'	Stadium: MMArena; Attendance: 14,440; Referee: Alain Hamer

2 April 2004 31	AS Monaco	3–3	Ajaccio	Fontvieille
20:00 CEST (UTC+2)	Nonda 50'; Plašil 66'; Pršo 89'	Report	Loko 24'; Robin 34', 40'	Stadium: Stade Louis II; Attendance: 7,119; Referee: Fredy Fautrel

10 April 2004 32	Lens	0–0	AS Monaco	Lens
17:15 CEST (UTC+2)		Report		Stadium: Stade Bollaert-Delelis; Attendance: 40,010; Referee: Stéphane Bré

2004 33	AS Monaco	0–1	Nantes	Fontvieille
17:15 CEST (UTC+2)		Report	Vahirua 77'	Stadium: Stade Louis II; Attendance: 11,503; Referee: Damien Ledentu

30 April 2004 34	Nice	1–2	AS Monaco	Nice
20:30 CEST (UTC+2)	Varrault 10'	Report	Pršo 34'; Giuly 44'	Stadium: Stade du Ray; Attendance: 13,107; Referee: Éric Poulat

9 May 2004 35	AS Monaco	1–0	Marseille	Fontvieille
20:45 CEST (UTC+2)	Giuly 90'	Report		Stadium: Stade Louis II; Attendance: 16,560; Referee: Laurent Duhamel

12 May 2004 36	Strasbourg	0–0	AS Monaco	Strasbourg
20:30 CEST (UTC+2)		Report		Stadium: Stade de la Meinau; Attendance: 25,585; Referee: Pascal Garibian

15 May 2004 37	AS Monaco	1–4	Rennes	Fontvieille
20:00 CEST (UTC+2)	Morientes 10'	Report	Frei 9'; Monterrubio 57' (pen.); Källström 69', 90'	Stadium: Stade Louis II; Attendance: 10,524; Referee: Bruno Derrien

21 May 2004 38	Bordeaux	1–3	AS Monaco	Bordeaux
20:30 CEST (UTC+2)	Riera 15'	Report	Adebayor 25'; Bernardi 76'; Nonda 78'	Stadium: Stade Chaban-Delmas; Attendance: 32,397; Referee: Philippe Kalt

=== Coupe de la Ligue ===
29 October 2003 Round of 32	Marseille	2–0	AS Monaco	Marseille
21:00 CET (UTC+1)	Fernandão 29'; Drogba 33'	Report		Stadium: Stade Vélodrome; Attendance: 33,974; Referee: Stéphane Bre

=== Coupe de France ===
4 January 2004 Round of 64	Metz	0–2	AS Monaco	Metz
CET (UTC+1)		[ Report]	Zikos 59'; Giuly 86'	Stadium: Stade Saint-Symphorien

24 January 2004 Round of 32	Valenciennes	0–0 (a.e.t.) (1–4 p)	AS Monaco	Valenciennes
CET (UTC+1)		[ Report]		Stadium: Stade du Hainaut

11 February 2004 Round of 16	AS Monaco	4–1	Lyon	Monaco
CET (UTC+1)	Morientes 45+1', 58', 62'; Pršo 86'	[ Report]	Élber 14'	Stadium: Stade Louis II

17 March 2004 Quarterfinal	AS Monaco	0–1	Châteauroux	Monaco
CET (UTC+1)		[ Report]	Sidibé 20'	Stadium: Stade Louis II

=== UEFA Champions League ===
==== Group stage ====
Pos	Team	Pld	W	D	L	GF	GA	GD	Pts	Qualification
1	(France) Monaco	6	3	2	1	15	6	+9	11	Advance to knockout stage
2	(Spain) Deportivo La Coruña	6	3	1	2	12	12	0	10	Advance to knockout stage
3	(Netherlands) PSV Eindhoven	6	3	1	2	8	7	+1	10	Transfer to UEFA Cup
4	(Greece) AEK Athens	6	0	2	4	1	11	−10	2	

Source: RSSSF

17 September 2003 1	PSV (Netherlands)	1–2	(France) AS Monaco	Eindhoven, Netherlands
20:45 CEST (UTC+2)	Bouma 65'	Report	Morientes 31'; Cissé 56'	Stadium: PSV Stadion; Attendance: 27,500; Referee: Stephen Graham Bennett (England)

30 September 2003 2	AS Monaco (France)	4–0	(Greece) AEK Athens	Monaco
20:45 CEST (UTC+2)	Giuly 23'; Morientes 27', 56'; Pršo 86'	Report		Stadium: Stade Louis II; Attendance: 12,000; Referee: Stefano Farina (Italia)

21 October 2003 3	Deportivo (Spain)	1–0	(France) AS Monaco	A Coruña, Spain
20:45 CEST (UTC+2)	Tristán 83'	Report		Stadium: Estadio Municipal de Riazor; Attendance: 25,000; Referee: Frank De Bleeckere (Belgium)

5 November 2003 4	AS Monaco (France)	8–3	(Spain) Deportivo	Monaco
20:45 CET (UTC+1)	Rothen 2'; Giuly 11'; Pršo 26', 30', 45+2', 49'; Plašil 47'; Cissé 67'	Report	Scaloni 45'; Tristán 39', 52'	Stadium: Stade Louis II; Attendance: 17,000; Referee: Brage Sandmoen (Norway)

25 November 2003 5	AS Monaco (France)	1–1	(Netherlands) PSV	Monaco
20:45 CET (UTC+1)	Morientes 34'	Report	Vennegoor of Hesselink 84'	Stadium: Stade Louis II; Attendance: 17,000; Referee: Miroslav Vitkovic (Croatia)

10 December 2003 6	AEK Athens (Greece)	0–0	(France) AS Monaco	Athens, Greece
20:45 CET (UTC+1)		Report		Stadium: Leoforos Alexandras Stadium; Attendance: 11,000; Referee: Wolfgang Stark

==== Knockout stage ====
===== Round of 16 =====
24 February 2004 First leg	Lokomotiv Moscow (Russia)	2–1	(France) AS Monaco	Moscow, Russia
18:30 CET (UTC+1)	Izmailov 32'; Maminov 59'	Report	Morientes 69'	Stadium: Stadion Lokomotiv; Attendance: 25,000; Referee: Alberto Undiano Mallenco

10 March 2004 Second leg	AS Monaco (France)	1–0 (a2 – 2 agg.)	(Russia) Lokomotiv Moscow	Monaco
20:45 CET (UTC+1)	Pršo 60'	Report		Stadium: Stade Louis II; Attendance: 18,000; Referee: Lucílio Batista

===== Quarter-final =====
24 March 2004 First leg	Real Madrid (Spain)	4–2	(France) AS Monaco	Madrid, Spain
20:45 CET (UTC+1)	Helguera 51'; Zidane 70'; Figo 77'; Ronaldo 81'	Report	Squillaci 43'; Morientes 83'	Stadium: Santiago Bernabéu; Attendance: 70,000; Referee: Ľuboš Micheľ

6 April 2004 Second leg	AS Monaco (France)	3–1 (a5 – 5 agg.)	(Spain) Real Madrid	Monaco
20:45 CEST (UTC+2)	Giuly 45+1', 66'; Morientes 48'	Report	Raúl 36'	Stadium: Stade Louis II; Attendance: 18,500; Referee: Pierluigi Collina

===== Semi-final =====
20 April 2004 First leg	AS Monaco (France)	3–1	(England) Chelsea	Monaco
20:45 CEST (UTC+2)	Pršo 17'; Morientes 78'; Nonda 83'	Report	Crespo 22'	Stadium: Stade Louis II; Attendance: 15,500; Referee: Urs Meier

5 May 2004 Second leg	Chelsea (England)	2–2 (3–5 agg.)	(France) AS Monaco	London, England
20:45 CEST (UTC+2)	Grønkjær 22'; Lampard 44'	Report	Ibarra 45+2'; Morientes 60'	Stadium: Stamford Bridge; Attendance: 37,132; Referee: Anders Frisk

==== Final ====
26 May 2004	AS Monaco (France)	0–3	(Portugal) Porto	Gelsenkirchen, Germany
20:45 CEST (UTC+2)		Report	Carlos Alberto 39'; Deco 71'; Alenichev 75'	Stadium: Arena AufSchalke; Attendance: 53,000; Referee: Kim Milton Nielsen

== Statistics ==
As of match played 26 May 2004

=== Appearances and goals ===
No.	Pos	Nat	Player	Total		Ligue 1		Coupe de la Ligue		Coupe de France		Champions League	
No.	Pos	Nat	Player	Apps	Goals	Apps	Goals	Apps	Goals	Apps	Goals	Apps	Goals
3	DF	(France) FRA	Patrice Evra	47	0	33+1	0	0	0	0	0	13	0
4	DF	(Argentina) ARG	Hugo Ibarra	35	1	20+5	0	0	0	0	0	7+3	1
6	MF	(Czech Republic) CZE	Jaroslav Plašil	44	3	15+18	2	1	0	0	0	4+6	1
7	MF	(Argentina) ARG	Lucas Bernardi	46	2	32+2	2	0	0	0	0	12	0
8	MF	(France) FRA	Ludovic Giuly	40	17	28+2	13	0	0	0	0	10	4
9	FW	(Croatia) CRO	Dado Pršo	41	15	16+13	8	1	0	0	0	6+5	7
10	FW	(Spain) ESP	Fernando Morientes	41	19	27+2	10	0	0	0	0	12	9
12	DF	(Italy) ITA	Joseph Dayo Oshadogan	3	0	1+2	0	0	0	0	0	0	0
14	MF	(France) FRA	Édouard Cissé	43	3	18+12	1	0	0	0	0	9+4	2
15	MF	(Greece) GRE	Akis Zikos	40	1	28+3	1	0	0	0	0	8+1	0
18	FW	(Democratic Republic of the Congo) COD	Shabani Nonda	16	6	7+5	5	0	0	0	0	0+4	1
19	DF	(France) FRA	Sébastien Squillaci	35	6	26	5	0	0	0	0	8+1	1
21	MF	(France) FRA	Nicolas Hislen	3	0	0+2	0	1	0	0	0	0	0
22	FW	(France) FRA	Laurent Lanteri	1	0	0+1	0	0	0	0	0	0	0
24	FW	(Togo) TOG	Emmanuel Adebayor	40	8	21+10	8	0	0	0	0	3+6	0
25	MF	(France) FRA	Jérôme Rothen	46	1	33+1	0	0	0	0	0	12	1
27	DF	(France) FRA	Julien Rodriguez	48	0	35	0	0	0	0	0	13	0
28	DF	(Portugal) POR	Marco Ramos	1	0	0+1	0	0	0	0	0	0	0
29	GK	(Senegal) SEN	Tony Sylva	6	0	4	0	1	0	0	0	1	0
30	GK	(Italy) ITA	Flavio Roma	46	0	34	0	0	0	0	0	12	0
31	FW	(France) FRA	Sébastien Grax	1	0	0+1	0	0	0	0	0	0	0
32	DF	(France) FRA	Gaël Givet	47	2	25+8	2	1	0	0	0	13	0
33	FW	(France) FRA	Nicolas Raynier	3	0	1+2	0	0	0	0	0	0	0
34	MF	(France) FRA	Jimmy Juan	2	0	1	0	1	0	0	0	0	0
35	DF	(Norway) NOR	Hassan El Fakiri	21	0	9+9	0	1	0	0	0	0+2	0
38	MF	(France) FRA	Laurent Mohellebi	1	0	0	0	1	0	0	0	0	0
39	DF	(France) FRA	Jim Ablancourt	5	0	2+2	0	1	0	0	0	0	0
Players away from AS Monaco on loan:
26	FW	(Senegal) SEN	Souleymane Camara	6	0	2+2	0	1	0	0	0	0+1	0
37	MF	(France) FRA	Sébastien Carole	2	0	0	0	1	0	0	0	0+1	0
Players who appeared for AS Monaco that left during the season:

=== Goal scorers ===
Place	Position	Nation	Number	Name	Ligue 1	Coupe de France	Coupe de la Ligue	UEFA Champions League	Total
1	FW	(Spain)	10	Fernando Morientes	10	3	0	9	22
2	MF	(France)	8	Ludovic Giuly	13	1	0	4	18
3	FW	(Croatia)	9	Dado Pršo	8	1	0	7	16
4	FW	(Togo)	24	Emmanuel Adebayor	8	0	0	0	8
5	DF	(France)	19	Sébastien Squillaci	5	0	0	1	6
5	FW	(Democratic Republic of the Congo)	18	Shabani Nonda	5	0	0	1	6
7	MF	(Czech Republic)	6	Jaroslav Plašil	2	0	0	1	3
7	MF	(France)	14	Édouard Cissé	1	0	0	2	3
9	MF	(Argentina)	7	Lucas Bernardi	2	0	0	0	2
9	DF	(France)	32	Gaël Givet	2	0	0	0	2
9				Own goal	2	0	0	0	2
9	MF	(Greece)	15	Akis Zikos	1	1	0	0	2
12	MF	(France)	25	Jérôme Rothen	0	0	0	1	1
12	DF	(Argentina)	4	Hugo Ibarra	0	0	0	1	1
				TOTALS	59	6	0	27	92

=== Disciplinary record ===
Number	Nation	Position	Name	Ligue 1		Coupe de la Ligue		Coupe de France		Champions League		Total	
Number	Nation	Position	Name	Booked	Sent off (straight red)	Booked	Sent off (straight red)	Booked	Sent off (straight red)	Booked	Sent off (straight red)	Booked	Sent off (straight red)
3	(France)	DF	Patrice Evra	8	1					2	0	2	0
4	(Argentina)	DF	Hugo Ibarra	4	0					1	0	1	0
6	(Czech Republic)	MF	Jaroslav Plašil	3	0					1	0	1	0
7	(Argentina)	MF	Lucas Bernardi	12	0					4	0	4	0
8	(France)	MF	Ludovic Giuly	2	0					0	1	0	1
9	(Croatia)	FW	Dado Pršo	3	0					1	0	1	0
10	(Spain)	FW	Fernando Morientes	2	0					1	0	1	0
12	(Italy)	DF	Joseph Dayo Oshadogan	1	0					0	0	1	0
14	(France)	MF	Édouard Cissé	6	0					1	0	1	0
15	(Greece)	MF	Akis Zikos	6	0					3	2	3	2
19	(France)	DF	Sébastien Squillaci	2	0					1	0	1	0
24	(Togo)	FW	Emmanuel Adebayor	2	0					0	0	1	0
25	(France)	MF	Jérôme Rothen	2	0					2	0	2	0
26	(Senegal)	FW	Souleymane Camara	1	0					0	0	1	0
27	(France)	DF	Julien Rodriguez	5	0					1	0	1	0
30	(Italy)	GK	Flavio Roma	2	0					1	0	1	0
32	(France)	DF	Gaël Givet	3	1					1	0	1	0
			TOTALS	64	2					20	3	84	5
