= 2001–02 AS Monaco FC season =

AS Monaco
2001–02 season
- President: Pierre Svara
- Head coach: Didier Deschamps
- Stadium: Stade Louis II
- Ligue 1: 15th
- Coupe de France: Quarter-finals
- Coupe de la Ligue: Quarter-finals
- Top goalscorer: League: Shabani Nonda (14); All: Shabani Nonda (17)
Home colours

AS Monaco's 2001–02 season was their 45th in the French Division 1 (although not part of France), and finished 15th.

== Squad ==
Note: Flags indicate national team as defined under FIFA eligibility rules; some limited exceptions apply. Players may hold more than one non-FIFA nationality.

| No. | Pos. | Nation | Player |
|---|---|---|---|
| 1 | GK | FRA | Stéphane Porato |
| 3 | DF | BEL | Philippe Léonard |
| 4 | DF | MEX | Rafael Márquez |
| 5 | DF | FRA | Éric Cubilier |
| 6 | MF | YUG | Vladimir Jugović |
| 7 | MF | ARG | Lucas Bernardi |
| 8 | MF | FRA | Ludovic Giuly (captain) |
| 9 | FW | CRO | Dado Pršo |
| 10 | MF | ARG | Marcelo Gallardo |
| 11 | MF | FRA | Jérôme Rothen |
| 12 | FW | ROU | Florin Răducioiu |
| 14 | FW | FRA | Eric Abidal |
| 15 | MF | FRA | Cyril Rool |
| 16 | GK | FRA | André Biancarelli |
| 17 | DF | CIV | Cyril Domoraud |

| No. | Pos. | Nation | Player |
|---|---|---|---|
| 18 | FW | COD | Shabani Nonda (Note: Nonda was born in Bujumbura, Burundi.) |
| 19 | MF | FRA | Grégory Lacombe |
| 20 | FW | GER | Oliver Bierhoff |
| 21 | MF | SWE | Pontus Farnerud |
| 22 | DF | FRA | Djibril Sidibé |
| 23 | DF | FRA | Bruno Irles |
| 24 | DF | FRA | José-Karl Pierre-Fanfan |
| 25 | FW | SEN | Souleymane Camara |
| 27 | DF | FRA | Julien Rodriguez |
| 30 | GK | ITA | Flavio Roma |
| 31 | DF | FRA | Gaël Givet |
| 33 | MF | GHA | Alex Nyarko |
| — | GK | SEN | Tony Sylva |
| — | DF | FRA | Sébastien Squillaci |

== Competitions ==
=== French Division 1 ===
==== League table ====
| Pos | Team | Pld | W | D | L | GF | GA | GD | Pts | Qualification or relegation |
|---|---|---|---|---|---|---|---|---|---|---|
| 13 | Montpellier | 34 | 9 | 13 | 12 | 28 | 31 | −3 | 40 | |
| 14 | Sedan | 34 | 8 | 15 | 11 | 35 | 39 | −4 | 39 | |
| 15 | Monaco | 34 | 9 | 12 | 13 | 36 | 41 | −5 | 39 | |
| 16 | Guingamp | 34 | 9 | 8 | 17 | 34 | 57 | −23 | 35 | |
| 17 | Metz (R) | 34 | 9 | 6 | 19 | 31 | 47 | −16 | 33 | Relegation to Ligue 2 |

Source: Ligue 1
Rules for classification: 1) points; 2) goal difference; 3) number of goals scored.
(R) Relegated

=== Coupe de la Ligue ===
AS Monaco FC was defeated 2-1 by the Girondins de Bordeaux in the quarter-finals.
