= 2002–03 AS Monaco FC season =

AS Monaco
2002–03 season
- President: Pierre Svara
- Head coach: Didier Deschamps
- Stadium: Stade Louis II
- Ligue 1: 2nd
- Coupe de France: Round of 64
- Coupe de la Ligue: Winners
- Top goalscorer: League: Shabani Nonda (26); All: Shabani Nonda (28)
Home colours

The 2002–03 season was AS Monaco FC's 46th season in Ligue 1. They finished second in Ligue 1, qualifying for the group stage of the 2003–04 UEFA Champions League. The club also competed in the Coupe de France, where it lost in the Round of 64 to Wasquehal Football, and the Coupe de la Ligue, defeating Sochaux in the final on 17 May 2003.

== Overview ==
Monaco finished the Ligue 1 season in second place, just 1 point behind league champions Lyon. Monaco were the highest scoring side in the division with 66 goals and striker Shabani Nonda was the golden boot winner with 26 goals. Winger Jérôme Rothen contributed 18 assists in the league campaign and also finished first in the league in that statistic. Both players were included in the end of season Ligue 1 team of the year.

== Squad ==
Note: Flags indicate national team as defined under FIFA eligibility rules; some limited exceptions apply. Players may hold more than one non-FIFA nationality.

No.	Pos.	Nation	Player
2	DF	FRA	Franck Jurietti
4	DF	MEX	Rafael Márquez
5	DF	FRA	Éric Cubilier
6	MF	SCG	Vladimir Jugović
7	MF	ARG	Lucas Bernardi
8	MF	FRA	Ludovic Giuly (captain)
9	FW	CRO	Dado Pršo
10	MF	ARG	Marcelo Gallardo
11	FW	ITA	Marco Simone
13	DF	FRA	Patrice Evra (Note: Evra was born in Dakar, Senegal.)
15	MF	GRE	Akis Zikos
16	GK	FRA	André Biancarelli
17	DF	BEL	Philippe Léonard
18	FW	COD	Shabani Nonda (Note: Nonda was born in Bujumbura, Burundi.)
19	DF	FRA	Sébastien Squillaci

No.	Pos.	Nation	Player
21	MF	SWE	Pontus Farnerud
23	FW	FRA	Nicolas Raynier
24	DF	FRA	José-Karl Pierre-Fanfan
25	MF	FRA	Jérôme Rothen
26	FW	SEN	Souleymane Camara
27	DF	FRA	Julien Rodriguez
29	GK	SEN	Tony Sylva
30	GK	ITA	Flavio Roma
31	FW	FRA	Sébastien Grax
32	DF	FRA	Gaël Givet
33	FW	FRA	Laurent Lanteri
34	MF	FRA	Jimmy Juan
35	MF	NOR	Hassan El Fakiri (Note: El Fakiri was born in Temsamane, Morocco.)
37	MF	FRA	Sébastien Carole
38	MF	FRA	Nicolas Hislen

== Competitions ==
=== Ligue 1 ===
==== League table ====
Pos	Team	Pld	W	D	L	GF	GA	GD	Pts	Qualification or relegation
1	Lyon (C)	38	19	11	8	63	41	+22	68	Qualification to Champions League group stage
2	Monaco	38	19	10	9	66	33	+33	67	Qualification to Champions League group stage
3	Marseille	38	19	8	11	41	36	+5	65	Qualification to Champions League third qualifying round
4	Bordeaux	38	18	10	10	57	36	+21	64	Qualification to UEFA Cup first round
5	Sochaux	38	17	13	8	46	31	+15	64	Qualification to UEFA Cup first round

Source: Ligue 1
Rules for classification: 1) points; 2) goal difference; 3) number of goals scored.
(C) Champions

==== Results summary ====
Overall								Home						Away					
Pld	W	D	L	GF	GA	GD	Pts	W	D	L	GF	GA	GD	W	D	L	GF	GA	GD
38	19	10	9	66	33	+33	67	12	4	3	37	13	+24	7	6	6	29	20	+9

Last updated: 8 September 2015.
Source: Competitive matches

==== Results by round ====
Round	1	2	3	4	5	6	7	8	9	10	11	12	13	14	15	16	17	18	19	20	21	22	23	24	25	26	27	28	29	30	31	32	33	34	35	36	37	38
Ground	A	H	A	H	A	H	A	A	H	A	H	A	H	A	H	A	H	A	H	A	H	A	H	A	H	H	A	H	A	H	A	H	A	H	A	H	A	H
Result	W	L	L	W	L	W	D	W	W	D	D	D	D	L	W	L	W	W	W	D	D	D	D	W	W	W	D	W	W	L	W	L	W	W	L	W	L	W
Position	1	8	13	9	12	6	9	5	4	4	6	6	8	9	7	10	7	5	3	4	4	4	5	3	1	1	2	2	1	1	1	2	2	1	3	2	3	2

Source: Ligue 1
A = Away; H = Home; W = Win; D = Draw; L = Loss

=== Coupe de la Ligue ===
17 May 2003	AS Monaco	4–1	Sochaux	Stade de France, Saint-Denis
	Giuly 56', 77'; Squillaci 60'; Prso 66'		Saveljic 87' (pen.)	Attendance: 75,379; Referee: Damien Ledentu
