= List of AS Monaco FC players =

This is a list of players who made an appearance with AS Monaco FC in no particular alphabetical order but is organised into club appearance milestones.

Key:

GK	Goalkeeper	DF	Defender	MF	Midfielder	FW	Forward/Attacker

(*) Denotes that a stat is continuously changing and active player

Position - The players' role in a match on the pitch

Monaco - The Players time with club

Appearances - The matches that a player played in (Not to be confused with Matches started)

Goals - The total Goals scored with the club

Assists - The total Goals assisted with the club

== Players ==
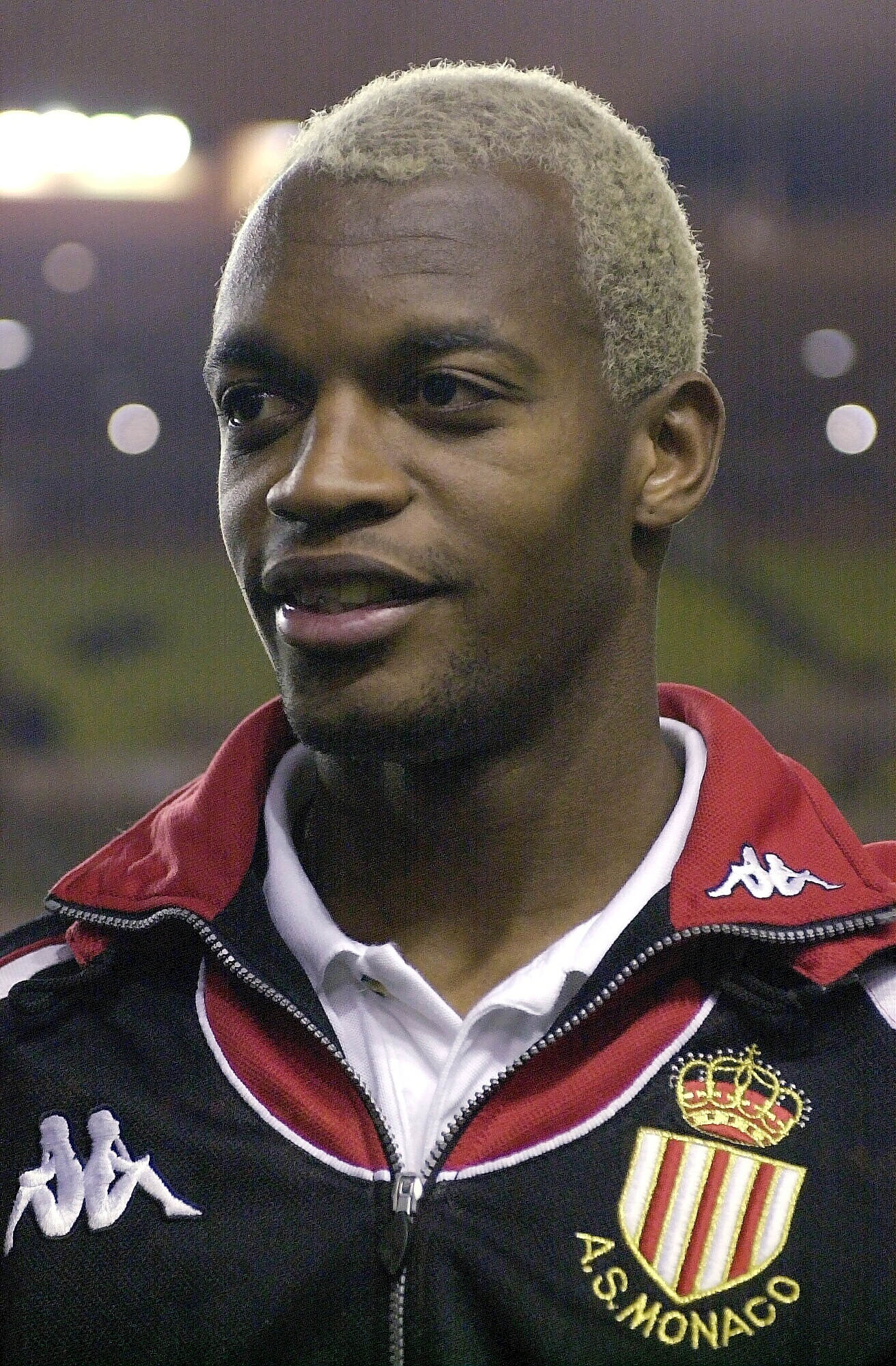
Wagneau Eloi

=== Less than 50 club Appearances ===
Player	Position	Monaco	Appearances	Goals	Assists	Source
(France) Paul Altavelle	GK	1948-1949	15	0	-	
(Morocco) Hassan Akesbi	FW	1964	11	6	-	
(France) Toussaint Andrietti	MF	1975-1976	3	0	0	
(Réunion) Jim Ablancourt	MF	2003-2004	8	0	0	
(Egypt) Mazhar Abdelrahman	FW	2002-2003	5	0	0	
(Tunisia) Aymen Abdennour	DF	2013-2015	24	0	0	
(France) Eric Abidal	DF	2000-2002, 2013-2014	47	0	0	
(Portugal) Adrien Silva	MF	2018-2020	37	0	2	
(United States) Freddy Adu	FW	2008-2009	9	0	0	
(Morocco) Youssef Aït Bennasser	MF	2018-2019	13	0	2	
(Ivory Coast) Jean-Eudes Aholou	MF	2018-2019, 2020-	19	0	1	
(Nigeria) Rbiu Afolabi	DF	2011-2012	14	1	0	
(Argentina) Sergio Almirón	MF	2007-2008	11	2	0	
(Argentina) Alejandro Alonso	MF	2008-2011	48	5	8	
(Brazil) Yeso Amalfi	DF	1991-1992	4	1	-	
(France) André Amitrano	GK	1978-1982	5	0	0	
(France) Jimmy Algerino	DF	1991-1992	3	0	0	
(France) Kylian Mbappe	FW	2015-2018	41	16	8	
(Haiti) Wagneau Eloi	FW	1999-2002	32	4	1	
(Iceland) Eiður Guðjohnsen	FW	2009-2010	9	0	0	
(Gabon) Pierre-Emerick Aubameyang	FW	2010-2011	19	3	2	

=== 50-100 club Appearances ===
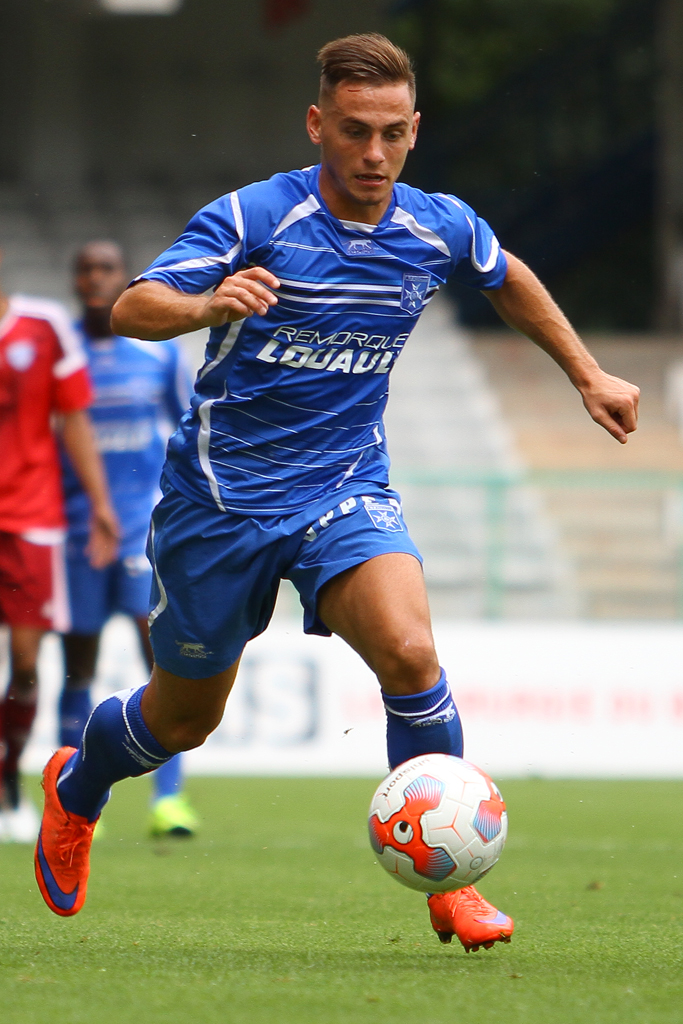
Ruben Aguilar

Player	Position	Monaco	Appearances	Goals	Assists	Source
(Bulgaria) Dimitar Berbatov	FW	2014-2015	53	18	11	
(Togo) Emmanuel Adebayor	FW	2003-2006	78	18	8	
(South Korea) Park Chu-young	FW	2008-2011	91	25	7	
(France) Ruben Aguilar	DF	2019-	52*	1*	5*	
(France) Thierry Henry	FW	1995-1999	97	17	-	
(Italy) Henri Alberto	GK	1956-1960	96	0	-	
(Spain) Cesc Fàbregas	MF	2018-2022	68	6	8	
(France) Jérôme Rothen	MF	2002–2004	82	5	29	

=== 100-150 club Appearances ===
Player	Position	Monaco	Appearances	Goals	Assists	Source
(Mexico) Rafael Márquez	DF	1999-2003	114	5	-	
(Brazil) Adriano Pereira da Silva	DF	2007-2013	116	5	3	
(France) Patrice Evra	DF	2002-2006	120	2	6	

=== 300+ club Appearances ===
Player	Position	Monaco	Appearances	Goals	Assists	Source
(France) Manuel Amoros	DF	1979-1989	304	39	1	
