= 2007–08 Olympique de Marseille season =

Marseille
2007–08 season
- Chairman: Robert Louis-Dreyfus
- Manager: Albert Emon; Eric Gerets
- Ligue 1: 3rd
- Coupe de France: Round of 16
- Coupe de la Ligue: Quarter-finals
- Champions League: Group stage
- UEFA Cup: Round of 16
- Top goalscorer: League: Mamadou Niang (18 goals); All: Mamadou Niang (23 goals)
Home colours	Away colours	Third colours

Olympique de Marseille extended their titleless run to 15 years – but had a decent season, where they qualified for the UEFA Champions League for the second year running, and won away from home in the 2007–08 tournament at Anfield against 2007 finalists Liverpool, but a 4–0 defeat at Stade Vélodrome in the last round knocked OM out of the tournament. Having sold Franck Ribéry to Bayern Munich for around 30 million euros, the stage was set for Marseille to push the boundaries financially in the coming seasons, with investments in the playing squad long overdue for a club that had been known as a club selling players expensively rather than buying.

== Squad ==
As of February 1, 2008.

Note: Flags indicate national team as defined under FIFA eligibility rules; some limited exceptions apply. Players may hold more than one non-FIFA nationality.

No.	Pos.	Nation	Player
1	GK	(France) FRA	Cédric Carrasso
2	MF	(Ivory Coast) CIV	Kanga Akalé (on loan from Lens)
3	DF	(Nigeria) NGA	Taye Taiwo
4	DF	(France) FRA	Julien Rodríguez
5	DF	(France) FRA	Jacques Faty
6	MF	(Algeria) ALG	Karim Ziani
7	MF	(France) FRA	Benoît Cheyrou
9	FW	(France) FRA	Djibril Cissé
10	MF	(Netherlands) NED	Boudewijn Zenden
11	FW	(Senegal) SEN	Mamadou Niang
12	MF	(Burkina Faso) BFA	Charles Kaboré
14	DF	(Senegal) SEN	Leyti N'Diaye
15	DF	(France) FRA	Ronald Zubar
16	GK	(France) FRA	Sébastien Hamel

No.	Pos.	Nation	Player
17	MF	(Cameroon) CMR	Modeste M'bami
18	FW	(France) FRA	Elliot Grandin
19	MF	(Albania) ALB	Lorik Cana (captain)
21	MF	(Serbia) SRB	Miloš Krstić
22	MF	(France) FRA	Samir Nasri
23	DF	(Argentina) ARG	Juan Ángel Krupoviesa (on loan from Boca Juniors)
24	DF	(France) FRA	Laurent Bonnart
26	DF	(France) FRA	Jean-Philippe Sabo
27	DF	(Senegal) SEN	Pape M'Bow
28	MF	(France) FRA	Mathieu Valbuena
29	FW	(Ghana) GHA	André Ayew
30	GK	(France) FRA	Steve Mandanda
32	DF	(France) FRA	Gaël Givet
40	GK	(France) FRA	Sébastien Maté

== Transfers ==
In: Note: Flags indicate national team as defined under FIFA eligibility rules; some limited exceptions apply. Players may hold more than one non-FIFA nationality.

No.	Pos.	Nation	Player
23	DF	(Argentina) ARG	Juan Krupoviesa (on loan from Boca Juniors)
7	MF	(France) FRA	Benoît Cheyrou (from Auxerre)
10	MF	(Netherlands) NED	Boudewijn Zenden (from Liverpool)
9	FW	(France) FRA	Djibril Cisse (from Liverpool)
5	DF	(France) FRA	Jacques Faty (from Rennes)
32	DF	(France) FRA	Gaël Givet (from Monaco)

Out: Note: Flags indicate national team as defined under FIFA eligibility rules; some limited exceptions apply. Players may hold more than one non-FIFA nationality.

No.	Pos.	Nation	Player
—	FW	(France) FRA	Mickaël Pagis (to Rennes)
—	FW	(Senegal) SEN	Rahmane Barry (to Sedan)
20	DF	(Cameroon) CMR	Salomon Olembe (to Wigan Athletic)
7	MF	(France) FRA	Franck Ribéry (to Bayern Munich)
23	DF	(Senegal) SEN	Habib Beye (to Newcastle United)
—	FW	(France) FRA	Fabrice Fiorèse (to Amiens)

== Competitions ==
=== Ligue 1 ===
==== League table ====
Pos	Team	Pld	W	D	L	GF	GA	GD	Pts	Qualification or relegation
1	Lyon (C)	38	24	7	7	74	37	+37	79	Qualification to Champions League group stage
2	Bordeaux	38	22	9	7	65	38	+27	75	Qualification to Champions League group stage
3	Marseille	38	17	11	10	58	45	+13	62	Qualification to Champions League third qualifying round
4	Nancy	38	15	15	8	44	30	+14	60	Qualification to UEFA Cup first round
5	Saint-Étienne	38	16	10	12	47	34	+13	58	Qualification to UEFA Cup first round

Source: Ligue 1
Rules for classification: 1) points; 2) goal difference; 3) number of goals scored.
(C) Champions

==== Results summary ====
Overall								Home						Away					
Pld	W	D	L	GF	GA	GD	Pts	W	D	L	GF	GA	GD	W	D	L	GF	GA	GD
38	17	11	10	58	45	+13	62	11	3	5	34	21	+13	6	8	5	24	24	0

Source: LFP.fr

==== Results by round ====
Round	1	2	3	4	5	6	7	8	9	10	11	12	13	14	15	16	17	18	19	20	21	22	23	24	25	26	27	28	29	30	31	32	33	34	35	36	37	38
Ground	A	H	A	H	A	H	A	H	A	A	H	A	H	A	H	A	H	A	H	A	H	A	H	A	H	A	H	H	A	H	A	H	A	H	A	H	A	H
Result	D	D	L	D	W	L	D	L	L	L	W	L	D	W	W	D	W	D	W	L	W	D	W	W	W	D	W	W	D	L	W	W	W	L	W	L	D	W
Position	14	13	15	14	11	15	16	16	17	18	18	19	19	17	15	16	13	14	11	13	10	11	9	5	4	5	4	4	4	4	4	4	3	4	3	4	4	3

Source: LFP.fr
A = Away; H = Home; W = Win; D = Draw; L = Loss

==== Matches ====
4 August 2007 1	Strasbourg	0–0	Marseille	Strasbourg
17:10				Stadium: Stade de la Meinau; Attendance: 26,397; Referee: Stéphane Lannoy

11 August 2007 2	Marseille	0–0	Rennes	Marseille
20:00				Stadium: Stade Vélodrome; Attendance: 55,896; Referee: Philippe Kalt

15 August 2007 3	Valenciennes	2–1	Marseille	Valenciennes
18:30	Savidan 62', 87'		Ziani 57'	Stadium: Stade Nungesser; Attendance: 16,028; Referee: Alain Hamer

19 August 2007 4	Marseille	2–2	Nancy	Marseille
21:00	Niang 22'; Cissé 50'		Gavanon 64' (pen.); Hadji 80'	Stadium: Stade Vélodrome; Attendance: 55,732; Referee: Olivier Thual

25 August 2007 5	Caen	1–2	Marseille	Caen
17:10	Samson 90+2'		Rodriguez 43'; Niang 54'	Stadium: Stade Michel d'Ornano; Attendance: 20,790; Referee: Thierry Auriac

29 August 2007 6	Marseille	0–2	Nice	Marseille
18:30			Hognon 51'; Hellebuyck 87'	Stadium: Stade Vélodrome; Attendance: 54,000; Referee: Saïd Ennjimi

2 September 2007 7	Paris Saint-Germain	1–1	Marseille	Paris
18:00	Luyindula 20'		Cissé 11'	Stadium: Parc des Princes; Attendance: 43,179; Referee: Stéphane Lannoy

15 September 2007 8	Marseille	1–2	Toulouse	Marseille
17:10	Zubar 90'		Emana 11'; Elmander 37'	Stadium: Stade Vélodrome; Attendance: 53,650; Referee: Jean-Charles Cailleux

22 September 2007 9	Auxerre	2–0	Marseille	Auxerre
17:10	Niculae 19', 23'			Stadium: Stade de l'Abbé-Deschamps; Attendance: 18,150; Referee: Lionel Jaffredo

6 October 2007 10	Saint-Étienne	1–0	Marseille	Saint-Étienne
17:10	Dernis 90'			Stadium: Stade Geoffroy-Guichard; Attendance: 32,004; Referee: Thierry Auriac

21 October 2007 11	Marseille	1–0	Lens	Marseille
21:00	Zenden 74'			Stadium: Stade Vélodrome; Attendance: 49,245; Referee: Stéphane Bré

27 October 2007 12	Sochaux	2–1	Marseille	Montbéliard
20:00	Zubar 31' (o.g.); Bonnart 52' (o.g.)		Niang 9'	Stadium: Stade Auguste Bonal; Attendance: 19,957; Referee: Saïd Ennjimi

3 November 2007 13	Marseille	0–0	Lorient	Marseille
20:00				Stadium: Stade Vélodrome; Attendance: 51,864; Referee: Olivier Thual

11 November 2007 14	Lyon	1–2	Marseille	Lyon
21:00	Juninho 7'		Niang 10' (pen.), 45'	Stadium: Stade de Gerland; Attendance: 38,811; Referee: Bertrand Layec

24 November 2007 15	Marseille	3–1	Metz	Marseille
20:00	Zenden 20'; Niang 36', 70'		Gueye 88'	Stadium: Stade Vélodrome; Attendance: 48,035; Referee: Lionel Jaffredo

1 December 2007 16	Lille	1–1	Marseille	Villeneuve-d'Ascq
20:00	Kluivert 27'		Niang 32'	Stadium: Stadium Lille-Metropole; Attendance: 17,618; Referee: Philippe Kalt

8 December 2007 17	Marseille	2–0	Monaco	Marseille
17:10	Rodriguez 52'; Cana 69'			Stadium: Stade Vélodrome; Attendance: 50,150; Referee: Damien Ledentu

16 December 2007 18	Bordeaux	2–2	Marseille	Bordeaux
20:55	Chamakh 32'; Jussiê 69'		Niang 2'; Cheyrou 26'	Stadium: Stade Chaban-Delmas; Attendance: 32,286; Referee: Laurent Duhamel

22 December 2007 19	Marseille	1–0	Le Mans	Marseille
20:00	Niang 14'			Stadium: Stade Vélodrome; Attendance: 40,886; Referee: Philippe Malige

13 January 2008 20	Rennes	3–1	Marseille	Rennes
20:55	Pagis 39'; Wiltord 82', 88'		Cissé 16'	Stadium: Stade de la Route de Lorient; Attendance: 29,278; Referee: Bruno Coué

19 January 2008 21	Marseille	3–1	Valenciennes	Marseille
20:00	Cissé 27', 73'; Rodriguez 51'		Audel 81'	Stadium: Stade Vélodrome; Attendance: 48,152; Referee: Tony Chapron

23 January 2008 22	Nancy	1–1	Marseille	Tomblaine
20:45	Brison 48'		Nasri 87'	Stadium: Stade Marcel Picot; Attendance: 19,901; Referee: Stéphane Lannoy

26 January 2008 23	Marseille	6–1	Caen	Marseille
20:00	Cissé 28', 55', 57'; Valbuena 41', 44'; Nasri 81'		Toudic 2'	Stadium: Stade Vélodrome; Attendance: 48,481; Referee: Stéphane Moulin

10 February 2008 24	Nice	0–2	Marseille	Nice
20:55			Niang 25'; Cissé 76'	Stadium: Stade du Ray; Attendance: 15,884; Referee: Laurent Duhamel

17 February 2008 25	Marseille	2–1	Paris Saint-Germain	Marseille
20:55	Taiwo 37'; Niang 45'		Rothen 29'	Stadium: Stade Vélodrome; Attendance: 56,863; Referee: Bertrand Layec

24 February 2008 26	Toulouse	0–0	Marseille	Toulouse
19:00				Stadium: Stadium de Toulouse; Attendance: 34,502; Referee: Lionel Jaffredo

1 March 2008 27	Marseille	2–1	Auxerre	Marseille
20:00	Cana 8'; Cissé 22'		Pedretti 89'	Stadium: Stade Vélodrome; Attendance: 53,100; Referee: Bruno Ruffray

9 March 2008 28	Marseille	2–0	Saint-Étienne	Marseille
18:00	Valbuena 59'; Taiwo 66'			Stadium: Stade Vélodrome; Attendance: 53,565; Referee: Fredy Fautrel

16 March 2008 29	Lens	3–3	Marseille	Lens
20:55	Maoulida 56'; Mangane 65'; Rémy 73'		Nasri 24'; Cheyrou 29'; Cissé 89'	Stadium: Stade Félix-Bollaert; Attendance: 40,477; Referee: Éric Poulat

22 March 2008 30	Marseille	0–1	Sochaux	Marseille
20:00			N'Daw 3'	Stadium: Stade Vélodrome; Attendance: 51,435; Referee: Thierry Auriac

30 March 2008 31	Lorient	1–2	Marseille	Lorient
20:55	Saïfi 43' (pen.)		Akalé 53'; Niang 80'	Stadium: Stade du Moustoir; Attendance: 15,436; Referee: Antony Gautier

6 April 2008 32	Marseille	3–1	Lyon	Marseille
20:55	Cissé 26'; Niang 28', 54'		Cana 43' (o.g.)	Stadium: Stade Vélodrome; Attendance: 56,271; Referee: Fredy Fautrel

12 April 2008 33	Metz	1–2	Marseille	Metz
20:00	Barbosa 3'		Cissé 14'; Nasri 57'	Stadium: Stade Saint-Symphorien; Attendance: 25,694; Referee: Philippe Malige

20 April 2008 34	Marseille	1–3	Lille	Marseille
20:55	Niang 13'		Mirallas 37', 40'; Makoun 67'	Stadium: Stade Vélodrome; Attendance: 51,674; Referee: Tony Chapron

27 April 2008 35	Monaco	2–3	Marseille	Monaco
20:55	González 56'; Leko 64'		Nasri 28'; Taiwo 61'; Cissé 82'	Stadium: Stade Louis II; Attendance: 17,368; Referee: Laurent Duhamel

4 May 2008 36	Marseille	1–2	Bordeaux	Marseille
20:55	Niang 45'		Wendel 80'; Ducasse 90'	Stadium: Stade Vélodrome; Attendance: 55,778; Referee: Stéphane Lannoy

10 May 2008 37	Le Mans	0–0	Marseille	Le Mans
20:45				Stadium: Stade Léon-Bollée; Attendance: 16,361; Referee: Bertrand Layec

17 May 2008 38	Marseille	4–3	Strasbourg	Marseille
20:50	Niang 7'; Cissé 45+2,', 78'; Nasri 45+5'		Fanchone 11'; Gameiro 18'; Zenke 72'	Stadium: Stade Vélodrome; Attendance: 55,543; Referee: Damien Ledentu

=== Coupe de France ===
5 January 2008 Round of 64	Beauvais	0–2	Marseille	Beauvais
18:15			Cana 23'; Cissé 32'	Stadium: Stade Pierre Brisson; Attendance: 10,465; Referee: Alain Hamer

3 February 2008 Round of 32	Marseille	3–1	Monaco	Marseille
21:00	Valbuena 6'; Grandin 10'; Cissé 62'		Bakar 70'	Stadium: Stade Vélodrome; Attendance: 35,000; Referee: Éric Poulat

19 March 2008 Round of 16	Carquefou	1–0	Marseille	Nantes
20:45	N'Doye 7'			Stadium: Stade de la Beaujoire; Attendance: 36,883; Referee: Saïd Ennjimi

=== Coupe de la Ligue ===
30 October 2007 Round of 16	Marseille	2–2 (a.e.t.) (5–4 p)	Metz	Marseille
21:00	Niang 94'; Cissé 105'		N'Diaye 96'; Baldé 120'	Stadium: Stade Vélodrome; Attendance: 21,389; Referee: Philippe Kalt
	Penalties
	Niang (penalty scored); Valbuena (penalty scored); Ziani (penalty scored); Cheyrou (penalty scored); Cissé (penalty scored)		(penalty scored) Agouazi; (penalty scored) Pjanić; (penalty scored) N'Diaye; (penalty scored) Bong; (penalty missed) Bassong

16 January 2008 Quarter-finals	Auxerre	1–0	Marseille	Auxerre
21:00	Pedretti 90+1'			Stadium: Stade de l'Abbé-Deschamps; Attendance: 13,006; Referee: Stéphane Bré

=== UEFA Champions League ===
==== Group stage ====
Pos	Team	Pld	W	D	L	GF	GA	GD	Pts	Qualification
1	(Portugal) Porto	6	3	2	1	8	7	+1	11	Advance to knockout stage
2	(England) Liverpool	6	3	1	2	18	5	+13	10	Advance to knockout stage
3	(France) Marseille	6	2	1	3	6	9	−3	7	Transfer to UEFA Cup
4	(Turkey) Beşiktaş	6	2	0	4	4	15	−11	6	

Source: RSSSF

18 September 2007 1	Marseille (France)	2–0	(Turkey) Beşiktaş	Marseille, France
20:45	Rodriguez 76'; Cissé 90+1'			Stadium: Stade Vélodrome; Attendance: 35,676; Referee: Matteo Trefoloni (Italy)

3 October 2007 2	Liverpool (England)	0–1	(France) Marseille	Liverpool, England
20:45			Valbuena 77'	Stadium: Anfield; Attendance: 41,355; Referee: Konrad Plautz (Austria)

24 October 2007 3	Marseille (France)	1–1	(Portugal) Porto	Marseille, France
20:45	Niang 70'		Lucho 79' (pen.)	Stadium: Stade Vélodrome; Attendance: 46,458; Referee: Manuel Mejuto González (Spain)

6 November 2007 4	Porto (Portugal)	2–1	(France) Marseille	Porto, Portugal
20:45	Sektioui 27'; Lisandro 78'		Niang 47'	Stadium: Estádio do Dragão; Attendance: 42,217; Referee: Wolfgang Stark (Germany)

28 November 2007 5	Beşiktaş (Turkey)	2–1	(France) Marseille	Istanbul, Turkey
20:45	Tello 27'; Bobô 88'		Taiwo 65'	Stadium: BJK İnönü Stadium; Attendance: 19,448; Referee: Luis Medina Cantalejo (Spain)

11 December 2007 6	Marseille (France)	0–4	(England) Liverpool	Marseille, France
20:45			Gerrard 4'; Torres 11'; Kuyt 48'; Babel 90+1'	Stadium: Stade Vélodrome; Attendance: 53,097; Referee: Terje Hauge (Norway)

=== UEFA Cup ===
==== Knockout phase ====
===== Round of 32 =====
13 February 2008 First leg	Marseille (France)	3–0	(Russia) Spartak Moscow	Marseille, France
20:45	Cheyrou 62'; Taiwo 68'; Niang 79'	Report		Stadium: Stade Vélodrome; Attendance: 31,790; Referee: Pedro Proença (Portugal)

21 February 2008 Second leg	Spartak Moscow (Russia)	2–0 (2–3 agg.)	(France) Marseille	Moscow, Russia
17:30	Pavlenko 39'; Pavlyuchenko 85'	Report		Stadium: Luzhniki Stadium; Attendance: 15,000; Referee: Thomas Einwaller (Austria)

===== Round of 16 =====
6 March 2008 First leg	Marseille (France)	3–1	(Russia) Zenit Saint Petersburg	Marseille, France
20:45	Cissé 37', 55'; Niang 48'	Report	Arshavin 82'	Stadium: Stade Vélodrome; Attendance: 24,327; Referee: Knut Kircher (Germany)

12 March 2008 Second leg	Zenit Saint Petersburg (Russia)	2–0 (3a–3 agg.)	(France) Marseille	Saint Petersburg, Russia
17:30	Pogrebnyak 39', 78'	Report		Stadium: Petrovsky Stadium; Attendance: 21,500; Referee: Mike Riley (England)

== Sources ==
- – Footballsquads – Marseille 2007/2008 7
- – LFP.fr – Ligue de Football Profesionel
