= Marco Ramos =

Marco Ramos may refer to:

- Marco Ramos (basketball) (born 1987), Mexican professional basketball player
- Marco Ramos (footballer) (born 1983), Portuguese professional football player
