= Flavio Roma =

Italian footballer (born 1974)

Personal information
- Date of birth: 21 June 1974 (age 52)
- Place of birth: Rome, Italy
- Height: 1.91 m (6 ft 3 in)
- Position: Goalkeeper

Youth career
- 1991–1993: Lazio

Senior career*
Years	Team	Apps	(Gls)
1993–1999	Lazio	0	(0)
1993–1994	→ Mantova (loan)	3	(0)
1995–1996	→ Venezia (loan)	7	(0)
1996–1997	→ Fiorenzuola (loan)	19	(0)
1997–1998	→ Foggia (loan)	36	(0)
1998–1999	→ Chievo (loan)	30	(0)
1999–2001	Piacenza	70	(0)
2001–2009	Monaco	205	(0)
2009–2012	Milan	2	(0)
2012–2014	Monaco	2	(0)
Total		374	(0)

International career
2005	Italy	3	(0)
- * Club domestic league appearances and goals

Flavio Roma (Italian pronunciation: [ˈflaːvjo ˈroːma]; born 21 June 1974) is an Italian former professional footballer who played as a goalkeeper.

== Playing career ==
Roma started his career in the youth teams of Lazio. He was the third goalkeeper behind Luca Marchegiani and Fernando Orsi before leaving the club to play for clubs in Serie B and Serie C1. In 1999, he was signed by the Serie A side Piacenza as part of Simone Inzaghi's deal, replacing Valerio Fiori as the first choice in his role. Still, the team was relegated at the end of the season.

=== Monaco ===
In 2001, he was signed by Monaco, then coached by Didier Deschamps, where he was the first-choice goalkeeper ahead of Tony Sylva and Stéphane Porato until the 2008–09 season, when he lost his place to Stéphane Ruffier. He was also in the squad that played the 2004 UEFA Champions League final. During his stay at Monaco, he only missed three months in the 2005–06 season due to injuries, and a shoulder injury ruled him out of the second half of the 2001–02 season in February 2002.

During his career at Monaco, Roma rejected an opportunity to join English side Arsenal in order to sign a new contract with the club.

=== Milan ===
On 12 August 2009, Roma signed a one-year contract with Milan to replace Zeljko Kalac, who was released from the club by mutual consent. Upon joining Milan, Roma cited joining the club as a dream come true, and Roma was expected to compete for the starting position with Marco Storari while Christian Abbiati and Dida were recovering from injury. However, Milan manager Leonardo preferred Storari and, after his return from injury, Dida. In January 2010, Storari left for Sampdoria, and Abbiati recovered from injury, making Roma the third-choice goalkeeper. At the end of the season, his contract was extended to an undisclosed length.

In 2011, Roma started in goal in two matches in the Coppa Italia against Bari and Sampdoria, earning a clean sheet against Bari and conceding only one goal away against Sampdoria. On 17 May 2011, Milan announced Roma extended his contract for an additional year.

On 13 May 2012, Roma announced he had played his last match for Milan.

=== Return to Monaco ===
On 2 August 2012, Roma signed for Monaco on a one-year deal on a free transfer. Following Monaco's promotion to Ligue 1, Roma made his first appearance in his second spell, where he came on as a substitute for Martin Sourzac in the second half, as Monaco won 2–1 against Tours. After making one appearance, Roma signed a contract extension. At the end of the season, he announced his retirement.

== International career ==
Roma received his first call-up for Italy ahead of Italy's friendly match against Finland, in Messina, on 17 November 2004, as manager Marcello Lippi was trying to identify a back-up goalkeeper for Gianluigi Buffon for the 2006 World Cup qualifying cycle; Roma did not appear in the match, however, which ended in a 1–0 victory to the Italians. Roma made his debut on 30 March 2005 in a 0–0 friendly draw with Iceland after replacing Morgan De Sanctis at half-time. That same year, he played his first full match as a starter on 11 June, in a friendly against Ecuador in the United states, which ended in a 1–1 draw. Later that year, he also appeared in Italy's 2–1 friendly defeat to Ireland in Dublin, on 17 August. Due to Roma's injury struggles throughout the 2005–06 season, he was not called up for Italy's warm-up friendlies ahead of the 2006 FIFA World Cup, and was not included in the final squad for the tournament, with Buffon, Angelo Peruzzi, and Marco Amelia being selected as the team's three goalkeepers, and De Sanctis as a reserve. Roma received his last senior international call-up in August 2006 under new manager Roberto Donadoni, ahead of Italy's first match after their 2006 World Cup victory, with Amelia starting ahead of him in the 2–0 friendly defeat to Croatia in Livorno, on 16 August. Roma did not make any more appearances for his country; in total, he received three caps for Italy, all in 2005.

== Style of play ==
Roma was known for his reflexes and shot-stopping ability as a goalkeeper. According to former Milan and Italy goalkeeper Giovanni Galli, Roma had excellent physical and mental attributes, as well as good goalkeeping technique, and a strong, dedicated, serious, and hard-working character. He likened Roma's style to that of his compatriot Francesco Toldo, even describing him as a potential successor for Toldo at Fiorentina. He highlighted Roma's ability to get to ground quickly, in spite of his large stature, as one of his main qualities, while he cited Roma's consistency and concentration as areas in need of improvement his youth.

== Coaching career ==
After retirement, Roma was hired by his former club AS Monaco as a goalkeeping coach for the youth teams, a role he filled in between 2017 and 2020. In 2022, Roma was named new goalkeeping coach of AC Milan, replacing Dida. He left AC Milan after just a year, as the club opted not to extend his contract.

== Career statistics ==
=== Club ===
Appearances and goals by club, season and competition
Club	Season	League			Cup		League Cup		Europe		Other		Total	
Club	Season	Division	Apps	Goals	Apps	Goals	Apps	Goals	Apps	Goals	Apps	Goals	Apps	Goals
Lazio	1991–92	Serie A	0	0	0	0	—		—		—		0	0
Lazio	1992–93	Serie A	0	0	0	0	—		—		—		0	0
Lazio	1994–95	Serie A	0	0	0	0	—		0	0	—		0	0
Lazio	Total		0	0	0	0	—		0	0	—		0	0
Mantova (loan)	1993–94	Serie C1	4	0	—		—		—		1	0	5	0
Venezia (loan)	1995–96	Serie B	7	0	1	0	—		—		—		8	0
Fiorenzuola (loan)	1996–97	Serie C1	19	0	—		—		—		—		19	0
Foggia (loan)	1997–98	Serie B	36	0	4	0	—		—		—		40	0
Chievo (loan)	1998–99	Serie B	30	0	4	0	—		—		—		34	0
Piacenza	1999–2000	Serie A	32	0	4	0	—		—		—		36	0
Piacenza	2000–01	Serie B	38	0	7	0	—		—		—		45	0
Piacenza	Total		70	0	11	0	—		—		—		81	0
Monaco	2001–02	Ligue 1	21	0	1	0	2	0	—		—		24	0
Monaco	2002–03	Ligue 1	28	0	0	0	4	0	—		—		32	0
Monaco	2003–04	Ligue 1	34	0	3	0	0	0	12	0	—		49	0
Monaco	2004–05	Ligue 1	34	0	4	0	1	0	10	0	—		49	0
Monaco	2005–06	Ligue 1	15	0	0	0	0	0	2	0	—		17	0
Monaco	2006–07	Ligue 1	38	0	0	0	2	0	—		—		40	0
Monaco	2007–08	Ligue 1	29	0	0	0	2	0	0	0	—		31	0
Monaco	2008–09	Ligue 1	4	0	0	0	1	0	—		—		5	0
Monaco	2009–10	Ligue 1	0	0	—		—		—		—		0	0
Monaco	Total		203	0	8	0	12	0	24	0	—		247	0
AC Milan	2009–10	Serie A	0	0	0	0	—		0	0	—		0	0
AC Milan	2010–11	Serie A	1	0	2	0	—		0	0	—		3	0
AC Milan	2011–12	Serie A	1	0	0	0	—		0	0	0	0	1	0
AC Milan	Total		2	0	0	0	—		0	0	0	0	4	0
Monaco	2012–13	Ligue 2	1	0	0	0	0	0	—		—		1	0
Monaco	2013–14	Ligue 1	1	0	0	0	0	0	—		—		1	0
Monaco	Total		2	0	0	0	0	0	—		—		2	0
Career total			373	0	30	0	12	0	24	0	1	0	440	0

=== International ===
Appearances and goals by national team and year
National team	Year	Apps	Goals
Italy	2005	3	0
Total		3	0

== Honours ==
Monaco

- Coupe de la Ligue: 2002–03
- Ligue 2: 2012–13
- UEFA Champions League: runner-up 2003–04

Milan

- Serie A: 2010–11
- Supercoppa Italiana: 2011
