= Dado Pršo =

Croatian footballer (born 1974)

- Pršo (left) playing for Croatia against Brazil's Lúcio at the 2006 FIFA World Cup

Personal information
- Full name: Miladin Pršo
- Date of birth: 5 November 1974 (age 51)
- Place of birth: Zadar, SR Croatia, Yugoslavia
- Height: 1.90 m (6 ft 3 in)
- Position: Forward

Team information
- Current team: Bordeaux (assistant coach)

Youth career
- 1981–1983: Bagat
- 1983–1986: Zadar
- 1986–1991: Hajduk Split

Senior career*
Years	Team	Apps	(Gls)
1992–1993	Pazinka	26	(2)
1993–1995	Rouen	10	(1)
1995–1996	Stade Raphaëlois	18	(7)
1996–2004	Monaco	101	(28)
1997–1999	→ Ajaccio (loan)	53	(21)
2004–2007	Rangers	94	(31)
Total		302	(90)

International career
2003–2006	Croatia	32	(9)

Managerial career
- 2024–: Bordeaux (assistant)
- * Club domestic league appearances and goals

Miladin "Dado" Pršo (born 5 November 1974) is a Croatian former professional footballer who played as a forward.

Pršo played for seven different teams, making 302 league appearances and scoring 90 goals. He was part of the Monaco team that reached the 2004 UEFA Champions League Final, as well as part of the Rangers team that won the League and Cup double in 2005. Pršo played 32 games for Croatia, scoring 9 goals, and was part of the team's squad at Euro 2004 and the 2006 World Cup. He retired in June 2007 from the Scottish Premier League club Rangers.

Pršo acquired French nationality by marriage. He was a coach for a youth team in Villefranche-sur-Mer. He is currently assistant manager of Bordeaux.

== Club career ==
=== Early career ===
Born in Zadar, Pršo began training with local clubs NK Bagat and NK Zadar before joining HNK Hajduk Split at the age of 12. He went through the ranks of Hajduk until, in 1991, a medical check allegedly revealed that he had an irregular heartbeat, prompting the team to release him, thinking he was therefore unfit for professional football. Pršo showed no traces of such a defect ever since, though. When the Croatian league was formed, he joined NK Pazinka, playing his only season at the top level of Croatian football at 18 years of age. In 1993, he moved to France to play for FC Rouen, and then moved to Saint Raphaël in 1995, where he worked as a car mechanic while he continued playing football.

=== Monaco ===
In 1996, then-AS Monaco manager Jean Tigana noticed Pršo and recruited the forward, although he would spend that season in the reserve side (alongside David Trezeguet), he was sent on loan to AC Ajaccio. In 1999–2000, he helped AS Monaco win the national championship. Pršo also helped them to the UEFA Champions League final in 2004. He is perhaps best remembered for his four goals in the 8–3 win over Deportivo La Coruña (a game which was played on his 29th birthday), which was the highest scoring Champions League scoreline. That night, he also equaled the competition record, joining Marco van Basten and Simone Inzaghi as the competition's top scorer in a single match; this has since been surpassed by Lionel Messi, Luiz Adriano and Erling Haaland.

=== Rangers ===
In May 2004, Pršo signed for Scottish side Rangers on a free transfer. In his first season at the club, he played 34 league matches, scoring 18 goals to help Rangers win the Scottish Premier League amid dramatic scenes in the final minutes on the last day of the season; he also won the Scottish League Cup. Departing Rangers manager Alex McLeish hailed Pršo as his "best Rangers signing," at the end of the 2005–06 season.

Pršo remained a member of the 2006–07 Rangers team, despite announcing his retirement from international football. He suggested he would retire from club football on the expiration of his contract in 2007. Despite this, Pršo's agent stated early in 2007 that he would like to continue playing for Rangers if his fitness allowed it, only to announce in February 2007 that his retirement was potentially imminent. Shortly afterwards, it was confirmed that Pršo could play for at least one season. But this comment proved to be premature as Pršo announced he would part company with Rangers at the end of the 2007 season due to his recurring knee problems. Pršo's agent also stated that he would seek a transfer to a league where physical fitness was not as much of a requirement, rather than end his footballing career entirely, and suggested North America and Asia as possible destinations.

At Pršo's last game at Ibrox Stadium, he walked off after the final whistle wearing a leg brace due to ankle damage. He waved at the 50,000 fans who waited, and was then given the "Guard of Honour" by his teammates, led by Barry Ferguson, before going back up the tunnel with tears in his eyes.

It was announced on 8 June 2007 that Rangers would release a DVD featuring highlights of Pršo's three seasons at Ibrox, with a large amount of proceeds donated to the Rangers Charity Foundation.

== International career ==
He made his debut for Croatia in a March 2003 European Championship qualification match against Belgium and went on to earn a total of 32 caps, scoring 9 goals. Pršo was part of the Croatian team at UEFA Euro 2004 where he played in three games. Pršo is remembered in this tournament for the one goal he scored against France in Leiria on 17 June 2004. After scoring four goals during qualifying, he was selected to represent his country at the 2006 FIFA World Cup. But he scored no goals during the tournament itself (where the team, as in 2004, was eliminated after the first round).

His final international was at that World Cup against Australia.

== Personal life ==
Pršo comes from a family located in Obrovac, Zadar County. His nephew Milan Pršo has mostly played for FK Rad and represented the Serbian national youth team. According to Milan, Dado's parents once lived in Bačka Topola, Serbia, but moved back to Zadar, Croatia.

Pršo and his wife Carol, who is French, have two children, Nicoline (born c. 1999) and Lorenzo (born 2001), who is also a footballer.

== Career statistics ==
=== Club ===
Appearances and goals by club, season and competition
Club	Season	League			National cup (Note: Includes Croatian Cup, Coupe de France, Scottish Cup)		League cup (Note: Includes Coupe de la Ligue, Scottish League Cup)		Europe		Other		Total	
Club	Season	Division	Apps	Goals	Apps	Goals	Apps	Goals	Apps	Goals	Apps	Goals	Apps	Goals
Pazinka	1992–93	Prva HNL	26	2			–		–		–		26	2
Rouen	1993–94	Division 2	10	1			–		–		–		10	1
Rouen	1994–95	Championnat National 2	0	0			–		–		–		0	0
Rouen	Total		10	1			–		–		–		10	1
Stade Raphaëlois	1995–96	Championnat National 2	18	7			–		–		–		18	7
Ajaccio (loan)	1997–98	Championnat National	23	8			–		–		–		23	8
Ajaccio (loan)	1998–99	Division 2	30	13	1	0	1	0	–		–		32	13
Ajaccio (loan)	Total		53	21	1	0	1	0	–		–		55	21
Monaco	1999–2000	Division 1	20	2	5	3	2	1	5 (Note: Appearances in UEFA Cup)	1	–		32	7
Monaco	2000–01	Division 1	21	4	0	0	2	0	5	0	1 (Note: Appearance in Trophée des Champions)	0	29	4
Monaco	2001–02	Division 1	11	2	3	1	2	0	–		–		16	3
Monaco	2002–03	Ligue 1	20	12	0	0	3	3	–		–		23	15
Monaco	2003–04	Ligue 1	29	8	4	1	1	0	11 (Note: Appearances in UEFA Champions League)	7	–		45	16
Monaco	Total		101	28	12	5	10	4	21	8	1	0	145	45
Rangers	2004–05	Scottish Premier League	34	18	1	0	3	2	8 (Note: Two appearances in UEFA Champions League, six appearances and one goal in UEFA Cup)	1	–		46	21
Rangers	2005–06	Scottish Premier League	32	9	1	0	1	0	7	3	–		41	12
Rangers	2006–07	Scottish Premier League	28	4	0	0	1	0	7	0	–		36	4
Rangers	Total		94	31	2	0	5	2	22	4	–		123	37
Career total			302	90	28	10	16	6	43	12	1	0	390	118

=== International ===
No.	Date	Venue	Cap	Opponent	Score	Result	Competition
1	29 March 2003	Stadion Maksimir, Zagreb, Croatia	1	Belgium	2–0	4–0	UEFA Euro 2004 qualifying
2	15 November 2003	Stadion Maksimir, Zagreb, Croatia	8	Slovenia	1–0	1–1	UEFA Euro 2004 qualifying
3	19 November 2003	Stadion Bežigrad, Ljubljana, Slovenia	9	Slovenia	1–0	1–0	UEFA Euro 2004 qualifying
4	17 June 2004	Estádio Dr. Magalhães Pessoa, Leiria, Portugal	14	France	2–1	2–2	UEFA Euro 2004
5	4 September 2004	Stadion Maksimir, Zagreb, Croatia	16	Hungary	1–0	3–0	2006 FIFA World Cup qualification
6	26 March 2005	Stadion Maksimir, Zagreb, Croatia	19	Iceland	4–0	4–0	2006 FIFA World Cup qualification
7	30 March 2005	Stadion Maksimir, Zagreb, Croatia	20	Malta	1–0	3–0	2006 FIFA World Cup qualification
8	30 March 2005	Stadion Maksimir, Zagreb, Croatia	20	Malta	2–0	3–0	2006 FIFA World Cup qualification
9	28 May 2006	Stadion Gradski vrt, Osijek, Croatia	28	Iran	1–1	2–2	Friendly

== Honours ==
AC Ajaccio

- Championnat National: 1997–98

Monaco

- Ligue 1: 1999–2000
- Coupe de la Ligue: 2002–03
- Trophée des Champions: 2000
- UEFA Champions League runner-up: 2003–04

Rangers

- Scottish Premier League: 2004–05
- Scottish League Cup: 2004–05

Individual

- Croatian Footballer of the Year: 2003, 2004, 2005
- SPL Player of the Month: February 2005, May 2005
- Franjo Bučar State Award for Sport: 2005
- SN Trofej Fair-play: 2005
- John Greig Award: 2007
