= Gaël Givet =

French association football player (born 1981)

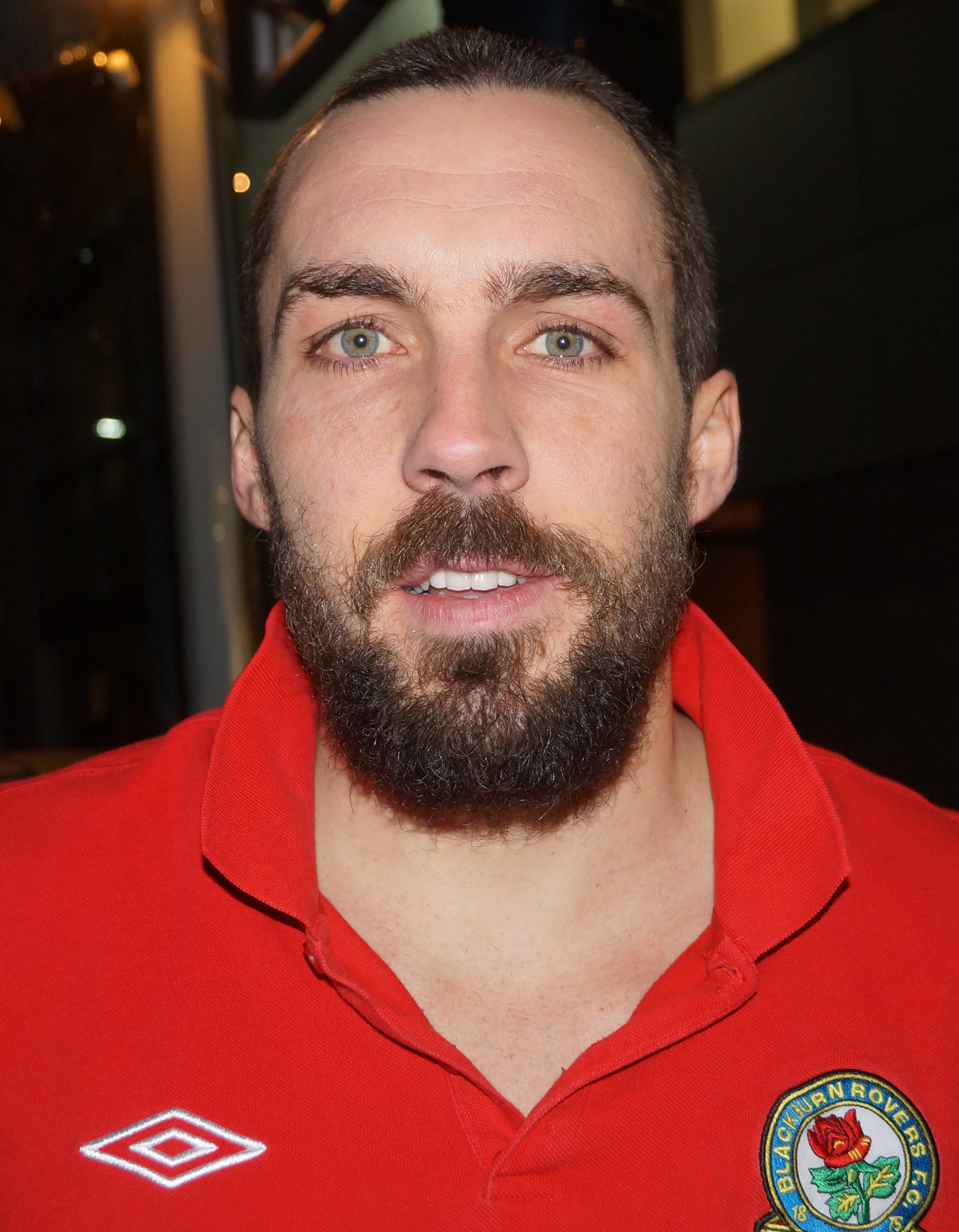
- Givet with Blackburn Rovers in 2013

Personal information
- Full name: Gaël Givet-Viaros
- Date of birth: 9 October 1981 (age 45)
- Place of birth: Arles, France
- Height: 1.81 m (5 ft 11 in)
- Position: Defender

Senior career*
Years	Team	Apps	(Gls)
1998–2000	Monaco B	44	(1)
2000–2007	Monaco	178	(8)
2007–2008	Marseille	29	(0)
2008–2013	Blackburn Rovers	115	(3)
2013–2014	Arles-Avignon	27	(1)
2014	Evian	1	(0)
2014–2015	Arles-Avignon	23	(0)
Total		417	(13)

International career
2004–2006	France	12	(0)
Medal record
Representing France
FIFA World Cup
Runner-up	2006
- * Club domestic league appearances and goals

Gaël Givet-Viaros (French: [ɡaɛl ʒivɛ]; born 9 October 1981), known as Gaël Givet, is a French former professional footballer who played as a left-footed centre back and as a left-back. Givet was a UEFA Champions League runner-up with Monaco in 2004 and was part of the France national team which reached the 2006 FIFA World Cup Final.

== Club career ==
=== Monaco ===
Born in Arles, France, Givet started his professional career at Monaco as a left-back before moving to centre-back. He made his debut in a 2–2 draw against Guingamp in December 2000. He played for Monaco between 2000 and 2007, making 178 league appearances and scoring eight goals. The highlights of his time at the club were winning the Coupe de la Ligue in 2003 and reaching the UEFA Champions League final in 2004, where he missed out on a winner's medal with a 3–0 defeat against José Mourinho's Porto. He played a pivotal role in their success, making 13 Champions League appearances during the campaign. He made a name for himself in the 2003–04 season where he blossomed in the Monaco defense alongside Patrice Evra, Julien Rodriguez and Sébastien Squillaci.

=== Marseille ===
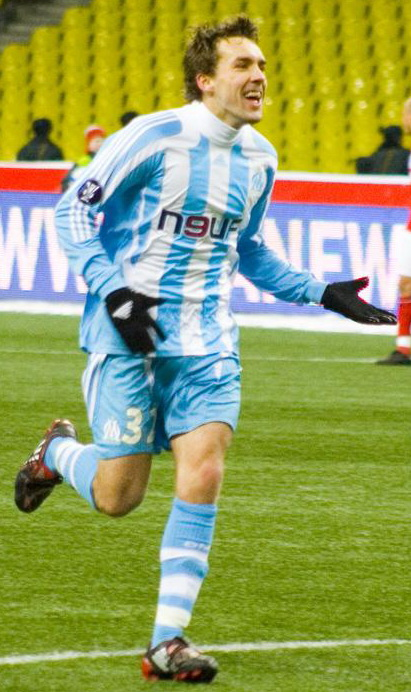
Givet playing for Marseille in 2008

After a successful career at Monaco, Givet moved to Marseille. During the 2007–08 season he featured 29 times in the French league and made nine appearances in the Champions League. At the beginning of the next season, however, he found his opportunities very limited in the first team.

=== Blackburn Rovers ===
On 10 January 2009, L'Équipe reported that Givet would be flying to England to finalize a six-month loan deal with English club Blackburn Rovers on 12 January. On 14 January, Sky Sports announced that Blackburn had completed the signing of Givet on a six-month loan deal with a view to a permanent move at the end of the season. This was confirmed by Marseille on 15 January. He appeared in his first match for Blackburn against Sunderland at the Stadium of Light, entering as a substitute in the FA Cup fourth round on 24 January 2009. The match finished 0–0, which resulted in a return fixture at Ewood Park on 4 February. Givet made his home debut in that match, which resulted in a 2–1 win for Blackburn. On 21 February 2009, he started and played the full 90 minutes against Manchester United at Old Trafford in a 2–1 defeat.

On 15 May 2009, an agreement in principle was made with Marseille to make his loan switch to Blackburn permanent. On 26 June 2009, Blackburn completed the signing of Givet on a four-year contract for £3.5 million. He scored his first goal in over three years against Sunderland on 22 August 2009 in a 2–1 away defeat. He scored his second goal for Rovers at home against Bolton Wanderers at Ewood Park on 21 February 2010 in a 3–0 victory. Following the 2009–10 season, Givet was awarded the Player's Player of the Year award by the club.

On 14 August 2010, Givet started and completed the full 90 minutes in the 1–0 win over Everton on the opening day of the new Premier League season. On 22 September 2010, he scored a volley from the edge of the area on 34 minutes against Aston Villa at Villa Park in the League Cup third round 3–1 defeat. On 13 November 2010, he scored a goal against Tottenham Hotspur at White Hart Lane and played the full 90 minutes at left-back in a 4–2 defeat. On 8 January 2011, he suffered a knee injury whilst playing in the FA Cup third round fixture against Queens Park Rangers in a 1–0 win for Rovers when he accidentally collided with Jamie Mackie and both players had to be stretchered off the field on around about the half-hour stage. In April 2011, Givet was left out of the squad as his future is in doubt after a £275,000 tax dispute with the club. At the end of the 2010–11 season, he made 32 appearances and scored two goals in all competitions.

On 24 August 2011, Givet made his first appearance of the 2011–12 season, playing the full 90 minutes against Sheffield Wednesday at Ewood Park in the second round of the League Cup. On 27 August, he started and played the full 90 minutes alongside Christopher Samba in a 1–0 defeat against Everton at Ewood Park. On 11 September, he started and played the full 90 minutes against Fulham in a 1–1 draw at Craven Cottage. On 17 September, he started the league game with Arsenal and completed the full 90 minutes at Ewood Park in a 4–3 victory in the left-back berth. On 20 September, he captained Rovers in their League Cup third round tie against Leyton Orient at Ewood Park which ended in a 3–2 win for Rovers and also played the full 90 minutes alongside Grant Hanley. On 24 September, Givet started and played the full 90 minutes against Newcastle United at St. James' Park in a 3–1 defeat. On 1 October 2011, he started and played the full 90 minutes at left-back in a 4–0 loss against Manchester City at Ewood Park. He was forced to leave the game against Sunderland on 11 December due to heart palpitations. Immediately suffering heart palpitations, Givet was taken to hospital and was to be monitored by club doctors, tested for an ongoing heart condition and the club are hopeful that the routine tests would show no problems. After suffering heart palpitations, manager Steve Kean recalled Givet suffering heart palpitations, told Givet to get off pitch before he collapsed and club doctor was unable to regulate heart beat.

We had a taste of this (what happened to Fabrice Muamba), although not to this level, with Gaël Givet. Gaël's heart went into a state where we couldn't regulate it. We were fortunate to get him off the pitch before we got to the state where he collapsed. We felt we got away with it there. The doc was telling me, 'You need to get him off, this is very dangerous' He actually said to the doc: 'I'm struggling here.' We stuck a heart rate monitor on him and it was going through the roof. The doc tried to calm it down but he couldn't regulate it, we had to get him off." Of the 30-year-old's recovery Kean added: "The doctors said it was a very straight forward procedure, even if it didn't sound like it – burning nerve-endings and all that. He had a problem near one of the chambers and it moved to another so they had to do it but since then he's been great. Kean recalls Gaël Givet's heart palpitations

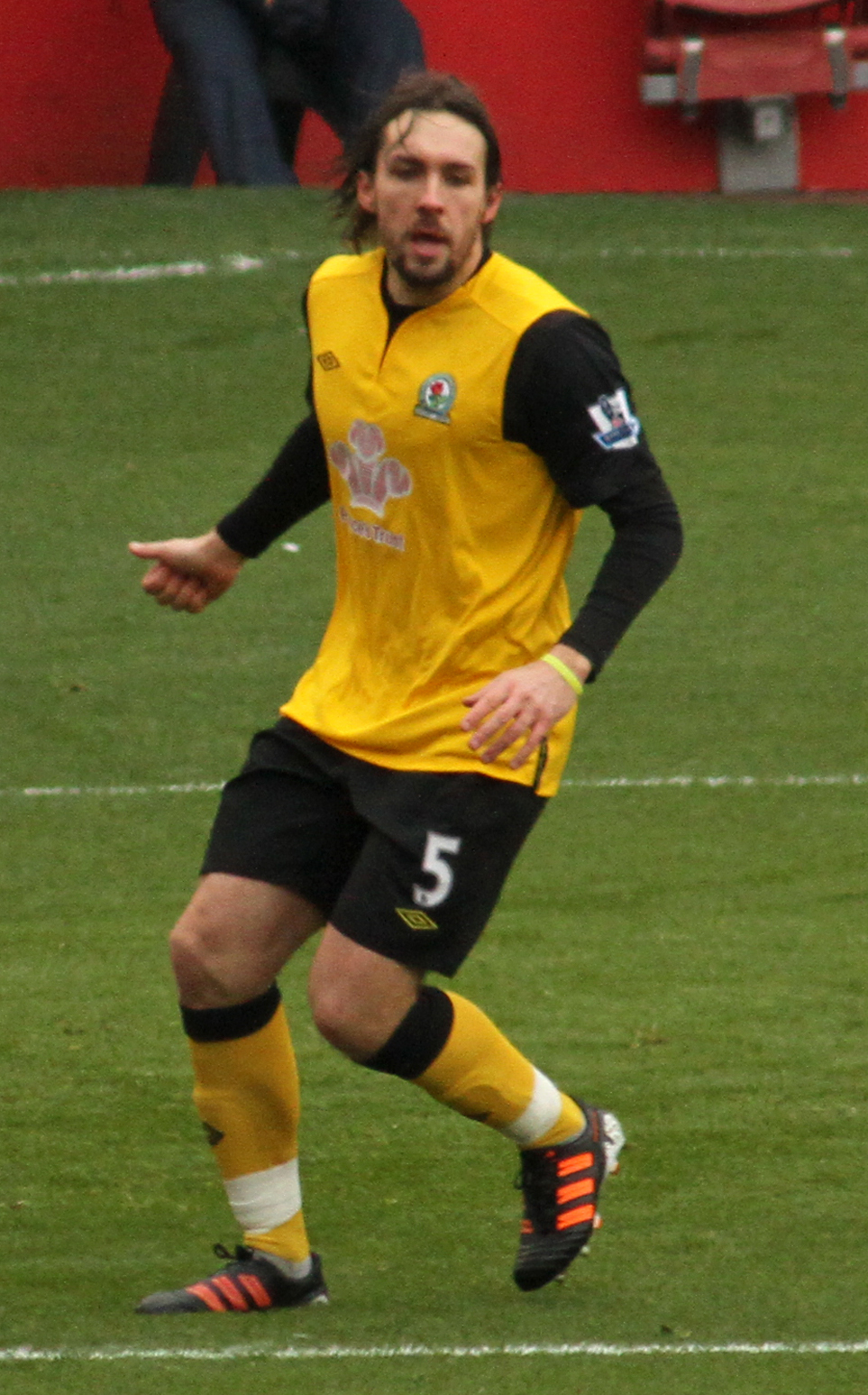
Givet playing for Blackburn Rovers in 2012

Also in the match between Blackburn Rovers and Wigan Athletic, the second half was delayed due to Givet and paramedics were treating him. This was a scare, but thankfully they revealed it was because he had suffered a hamstring strain.

On 4 February 2012, Givet received a red card just two minutes before half-time after a challenge on Robin van Persie as Blackburn were heavily defeated by Arsenal, 7–1. Since his sending off, he did not make his first appearance and rumors began to spread that Kean had been leaving Givet out because of a contract clause but Kean dismissed them. Despite not on the bench for Blackburn in a 3–0 defeat to Swansea City, Kean revealed he did not choose Givet stating was "not in the right frame of mind" to play. Afterwards, Givet said that he wanted to leave Blackburn in the summer. On 21 April 2012, he, however, was selected to start against Norwich City at Ewood Park in the Premier League and played the full 90 minutes, replacing the injured Scottish defender Grant Hanley. On 7 May 2012, Givet started the Premier League game alongside Scott Dann against Wigan at Ewood Park in a crucial game knowing that a win would put them on course for survival, but during half-time, he suffered a heart scare after a row with manager Steve Kean and from being upset that Rovers were going down. He therefore was substituted for midfielder Radosav Petrović. The match finished 1–0 to Wigan, relegating Blackburn.

=== Arles-Avignon ===
On 20 August 2013, Givet made a return to his boyhood team Arles-Avignon after four and a half years with Blackburn. He left the club in September 2014, signing for Evian Thonon Gaillard. However, after only one Ligue 1 game against his former team Marseille, he returned to Arles after falling out with Evian as they described his beard as "jihadist" and ordered him to shave it.

== International career ==
Givet represented France at international level. He made his debut as a half-time substitute for Monaco clubmate and fellow debutant Sébastien Squillaci on 18 August 2004 in a 1–1 friendly draw with Bosnia-Herzegovina. In 2006, he was a member of the French squad that reached the Final of the FIFA World Cup held in Germany, though he did not play. He earned 12 caps for his country, last appearing on 16 August 2006.

== Club career statistics ==
Appearances and goals by club, season and competition
Club	Season	League			Cup		Continental		Total	
Club	Season	Division	Apps	Goals	Apps	Goals	Apps	Goals	Apps	Goals
Monaco	2000–01	Ligue 1	1	0	0	0	0	0	1	0
Monaco	2001–02	Ligue 1	22	2	0	0	0	0	22	2
Monaco	2002–03	Ligue 1	21	1	0	0	0	0	21	1
Monaco	2003–04	Ligue 1	33	2	0	0	13	0	46	2
Monaco	2004–05	Ligue 1	31	0	0	0	9	1	40	1
Monaco	2005–06	Ligue 1	31	2	0	0	6	0	37	0
Monaco	2006–07	Ligue 1	32	1	0	0	0	0	32	1
Monaco	Total		171	8	0	0	28	1	199	9
Marseille	2007–08	Ligue 1	29	0	0	0	9	0	38	0
Blackburn Rovers	2008–09	Premier League	14	0	4	0	0	0	18	0
Blackburn Rovers	2009–10	Premier League	34	2	4	0	0	0	38	2
Blackburn Rovers	2010–11	Premier League	29	1	3	1	0	0	32	2
Blackburn Rovers	2011–12	Premier League	22	0	5	1	0	0	27	1
Blackburn Rovers	2012–13	Championship	16	0	0	0	0	0	16	0
Blackburn Rovers	2013–14	Championship	0	0	1	0	0	0	1	0
Blackburn Rovers	Total		115	3	17	2	0	0	132	5
Arles-Avignon	2013–14	Ligue 2	27	1	0	0	0	0	27	1
Evian	2014–15	Ligue 1	1	0	0	0	0	0	1	0
Arles-Avignon	2014–15	Ligue 2	23	0	5	0	0	0	28	0
Career total			366	12	22	2	37	1	425	15

== Honours ==
Monaco

- Coupe de la Ligue: 2002–03
- UEFA Champions League runner-up: 2003–04

France

- FIFA World Cup runner-up: 2006

Individual

- Ligue 1 Team of the Year: 2004–05
