= Tony Sylva =

Senegalese footballer (born 1975)

Personal information
- Full name: Tony Mario Sylva
- Date of birth: 17 May 1975 (age 51)
- Place of birth: Guédiawaye, Senegal
- Height: 1.85 m (6 ft 1 in)
- Position: Goalkeeper

Youth career
- ADS Aldo Gentina Dakar

Senior career*
Years	Team	Apps	(Gls)
1993–2004	Monaco	24	(0)
1995–1996	→ Gazélec (loan)	33	(0)
1996–1997	→ Épinal (loan)	10	(0)
2000–2001	→ Ajaccio (loan)	31	(0)
2004–2008	Lille	133	(0)
2008–2010	Trabzonspor	39	(0)
Total		270	(0)

International career
1999–2008	Senegal	83	(0)
- * Club domestic league appearances and goals

Tony Mario Sylva (born 17 May 1975) is a Senegalese former professional footballer who played as a goalkeeper.

He spent the vast majority of his 16-year professional career in France, playing in 157 Ligue 1 games during eight seasons and representing in the competition Monaco and Lille.

Sylva appeared with Senegal in the 2002 World Cup and four Africa Cup of Nations tournaments. He is the current goalkeeping coach of Senegal, appointed by Aliou Cissé in 2015.

== Club career ==
Born in Guédiawaye, Sylva spent nearly a decade at the service of AS Monaco FC, but featured mainly for the reserve team during his spell, being successively backup to Fabien Barthez and Flavio Roma in the main squad. He made his debut in Division 1 on 12 September 1999 in a 1–2 away against Stade Rennais FC, contributing with six appearances as the club won the national championship; he also served loans at Gazélec Ajaccio, SAS Épinal and AC Ajaccio before leaving in 2004, the latter two sides competing in Ligue 2.

Sylva subsequently signed for Lille OSC on a free transfer, never appearing in fewer than 30 league games in his four years and helping his team to the second position in 2004–05. He retired in June 2010 at the age of 35, after two seasons in Turkey with Trabzonspor; although his contract with the former was due to expire in June 2009, according to Article 17 of FIFA's regulations for the status and transfer of players he was allowed to leave the club.

== International career ==
Sylva earned 83 caps for Senegal, during nine years. His debut came on 6 June 1999, in a 2–2 draw in Burkina Faso for the 2000 African Cup of Nations qualifiers.

Sylva's was his country's first-choice at the 2002 FIFA World Cup, helping Senegal reach the quarter-finals in their first appearance in the competition.

== Career statistics ==
=== Club ===
Appearances and goals by club, season and competition
Club	Season	League			National cup		League cup		Europe		Total	
Club	Season	Division	Apps	Goals	Apps	Goals	Apps	Goals	Apps	Goals	Apps	Goals
Monaco	1997–98	Division 1	0	0	0	0	0	0	—		0	0
Monaco	1998–99	Division 1	0	0	0	0	0	0	—		0	0
Monaco	1999–2000	Division 1	6	0	1	0	0	0	3 (Note: Five appearances in UEFA Intertoto Cup)	0	10	0
Monaco	2001–02	Division 1	2	0	0	0	0	0	—		2	0
Monaco	2002–03	Ligue 1	12	0	1	0	1	0	—		14	0
Monaco	2003–04	Ligue 1	4	0	1	0	1	0	1 (Note: Appearcnes in UEFA Champions League)	0	7	0
Monaco	Total		24	0	3	0	2	0	4	0	33	0
Gazélec (loan)	1995–96	National	33	0	—		—		—		37	13
Épinal (loan)	1996–97	Division 2	10	0	0	0	1	0	—		11	0
Ajaccio (loan)	2000–01	Division 2	31	0	1	0	0	0	—		32	0
Lille	2004–05	Ligue 1	38	0	1	0	0	0	15 (Note: Five appearances in UEFA Intertoto Cup, ten appearances in UEFA Cup)	0	44	0
Lille	2005–06	Ligue 1	32	0	0	0	0	0	9 (Note: Six appearances in UEFA Champions League, three appearances in UEFA Cup)	0	41	0
Lille	2006–07	Ligue 1	33	0	0	0	0	0	8	0	41	0
Lille	2007–08	Ligue 1	30	0	1	0	0	0	—		31	0
Lille	Total		133	0	2	0	0	0	32	0	167	0
Trabzonspor	2008–09	Süper Lig	27	0	3	0	—		—		30	0
Trabzonspor	2009–10	Süper Lig	12	0	0	0	—		2 (Note: Appearances in UEFA Europa League)	0	14	0
Trabzonspor	Total		39	0	3	0	—		2	0	44	0
Career total			270	0	9	0	3	0	38	0	320	0

=== International ===
Appearances and goals by national team and year
National team	Year	Apps	Goals
Senegal	1999	2	0
Senegal	2001	7	0
Senegal	2002	16	0
Senegal	2003	9	0
Senegal	2004	14	0
Senegal	2005	8	0
Senegal	2006	8	0
Senegal	2007	8	0
Senegal	2008	11	0
Total		83	0

== Honours ==
Monaco

- Ligue 1: 1999–2000
- Coupe de la Ligue: 2002–03
- UEFA Champions League runner-up: 2003–04

Lille

- UEFA Intertoto Cup: 2004

Trabzonspor

- Turkish Cup: 2009–10

Senegal

- Africa Cup of Nations: runner-up 2002
