= Shabani Nonda =

Footballer (born 1977)

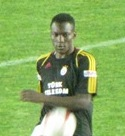
- Nonda playing for Galatasaray in 2008

Personal information
- Full name: Shabani Christophe Nonda
- Date of birth: 6 March 1977 (age 49)
- Place of birth: Bujumbura, Burundi
- Height: 1.82 m (6 ft 0 in)
- Position: Striker

Youth career
- 1990–1992: Atlético Olympic
- 1993–1994: Young Africans

Senior career*
Years	Team	Apps	(Gls)
1994–1995	Vaal Professionals	14	(9)
1996–1998	FC Zürich	75	(36)
1998–2000	Rennes	62	(31)
2000–2005	Monaco	116	(57)
2005–2007	Roma	15	(4)
2006–2007	→ Blackburn Rovers (loan)	26	(7)
2007–2010	Galatasaray	61	(22)
Total		369	(166)

International career
2000–2008	DR Congo	36	(20)
- * Club domestic league appearances and goals

Shabani Christophe Nonda (born 6 March 1977) is a former professional footballer who played as a striker. Born in Burundi, he played for the DR Congo national team, earning 36 caps and scoring 20 goals. He was selected for DR Congo's squad for the 2002 Africa Cup of Nations. He had a prominent Career with the East African giants Young Africans (Yanga), before joining Vaal professionals in South Africa.

== Club career ==
Born in Bujumbura, Burundi, Nonda began his career at Atlético Olympic in 1992. After training in Uganda with Mbarara F.C. then playing in Tanzania with Young Africans and in South Africa with Vaal Professionals, he was discovered by FIFA agent Marcelo Houseman who then placed Nonda in Switzerland with FC Zürich in 1996 for a transfer fee of US$150,000.

After finishing top goalscorer in Switzerland two years running he was transferred to French side Stade Rennais in 1998 for a record fee of US$9 million, and later moved to AS Monaco in 2000 again for €20 million, to replace David Trezeguet. His performances, including those in the 2004 UEFA Champions League final, earned him a move to Serie A club AS Roma on a three-year deal in 2005, for which he earned €1.8 million in gross per season. (however the tax rate including regional tax may have added up to around 50%) However, he never lived up to his potential – partly due to a knee injury sustained while at Monaco – and spent the 2006–07 season on loan at English side Blackburn Rovers. While at Blackburn, Nonda announced his intention to sign a permanent deal, Blackburn opted not to sign Nonda on a permanent deal and he later signed for Turkish club Galatasaray in August 2007 on a two-year deal. On 28 January 2010, Galatasaray released him by mutual consent.

== International career ==
Though he was born in Burundi, Nonda holds citizenship from Democratic Republic of the Congo and to date 36 international caps for the country, with 20 goals since 2000. He retired from international football in 2005, and returned in 2007. He scored a hat-trick against Djibouti in World Cup Qualifications in 2008.

== Outside football ==
=== Media personality ===
Throughout his footballing career, Nonda has hosted a DJ show for a Burundian radio station.

=== Commitment ===
Nonda is a member of the "Champions for Peace" club, a group of famous elite athletes committed to serving peace in the world through sport, created by Peace and Sport, a Monaco-based international organization.

== Career statistics ==
=== Club ===
Appearances and goals by club, season and competition
Club	Season	League			National cup (Note: Includes Swiss Cup, Coupe de France, Coppa Italia, FA Cup, Turkish Cup)		League cup (Note: Includes Coupe de la Ligue, Football League Cup)		Europe		Other		Total	
Club	Season	Division	Apps	Goals	Apps	Goals	Apps	Goals	Apps	Goals	Apps	Goals	Apps	Goals
FC Zürich	1995–96	Nationalliga A	10	4	—		—		—		—		10	4
FC Zürich	1996–97	Nationalliga A	31	8	—		—		—		—		31	8
FC Zürich	1997–98	Nationalliga A	34	24	1	0	—		—		—		35	24
FC Zürich	Total		75	36	1	0	—		—		—		76	36
Rennes	1998–99	Division 1	32	15	1	1	3	2	—		—		36	18
Rennes	1999–2000	Division 1	30	16	4	1	1	0	6 (Note: Appearances in UEFA Intertoto Cup)	2	—		41	19
Rennes	Total		62	31	5	2	4	2	6	2	—		77	37
Monaco	2000–01	Division 1	29	12	0	0	3	1	5 (Note: Appearances in UEFA Champions League)	3	—		37	16
Monaco	2001–02	Division 1	30	14	2	0	2	3	—		—		34	17
Monaco	2002–03	Ligue 1	35	26	1	1	4	1	—		—		40	28
Monaco	2003–04	Ligue 1	12	5	0	0	0	0	4	1	—		16	6
Monaco	2004–05	Ligue 1	10	0	3	0	2	0	3	0	—		18	0
Monaco	Total		116	57	6	1	11	5	12	4	—		145	67
Roma	2005–06	Serie A	15	4	2	2	—		5 (Note: Appearances in UEFA Cup)	2	—		22	8
Blackburn Rovers (loan)	2006–07	Premier League	26	7	2	0	1	0	7	1	—		36	8
Galatasaray	2007–08	Süper Lig	24	11	3	0	—		6	3	—		33	14
Galatasaray	2008–09	Süper Lig	24	4	1	0	—		9 (Note: Two appearances and two goals in UEFA Champions League, seven appearances in UEFA Cup)	2	1 (Note: Appearance in Turkish Super Cup)	1	35	7
Galatasaray	2009–10	Süper Lig	13	7	4	2	—		7 (Note: Appearances in UEFA Europa League)	7	—		24	16
Galatasaray	Total		61	22	8	2	—		22	12	1	1	92	37
Career total			355	157	24	7	16	7	52	21	1	1	448	193

== Honours ==
Monaco

- Coupe de la Ligue: 2002–03; runner-up: 2000–01
- UEFA Champions League runner-up: 2003–04

Roma

- Supercoppa Italiana: 2007

Galatasaray

- Süper Lig: 2007–08
- Turkish Super Cup: 2008

Individual

- Swiss Super League top scorer: 1997–98 (24 goals)
- Swiss Foreign Footballer of the Year: 1997–98
- Ligue 1 top scorer: 2002–03 (26 goals)
- Ligue 1 Team of the Year: 2002–03
