= Mazhar Abdel Rahman =

Egyptian footballer (born 1976)

Personal information
- Full name: Mohamed Mazhar Abdel Rahman
- Date of birth: 11 November 1976 (age 49)
- Place of birth: Cairo, Egypt
- Height: 1.85 m (6 ft 1 in)
- Position: Striker

Senior career*
Years	Team	Apps	(Gls)
1995–2000	Arab Contractors SC		
1998–1999	→ Goldi (loan)		
2000–2002	Al-Masry		(7)
2002–2004	AS Monaco	5	(0)
2003–2004	→ LB Châteauroux (loan)	10	(3)
2004	→ Jiangsu Shuntian (loan)	6	(0)

International career
1999–2001	Egypt	6	(2)
- * Club domestic league appearances and goals

Mohamed Mazhar Abdel Rahman (born 11 November 1976) is an Egyptian former professional footballer who played for AS Monaco and the Egypt national football team.

== International goals ==
#	Date	Venue	Opponent	Score	Result	Competition
1.	19 March 2001	Cairo International Stadium, Cairo, Egypt	Estonia	3–3	Draw	Friendly
2.	26 April 2001	Cairo International Stadium, Cairo, Egypt	South Korea	1–2	Loss	2001 LG Cup
