= Nicolas Hislen =

French footballer (born 1983)

Personal information
- Date of birth: February 11, 1983 (age 43)
- Place of birth: Chaumont, France
- Height: 1.79 m (5 ft 10 1/2 in)
- Position: Midfielder

Team information
- Current team: AC Arles-Avignon
- Number: 27

Senior career*
Years	Team	Apps	(Gls)
2002–2005	Monaco	3	(0)
2004–2005	→ Lorient (loan)	5	(0)
2005–2006	did not play		
2006–2007	FC Martigues		
2007–2009	AC Arles (am. levels)		
2009–	AC Arles-Avignon	2	(0)
- * Club domestic league appearances and goals as of 20:05, 11 November 2009 (UTC)

Nicolas Hislen (born February 11, 1983) is a French professional football player. Currently, he plays in the Ligue 2 for AC Arles-Avignon.
