= Marco Ramos (footballer) =

Portuguese footballer (born 1983)

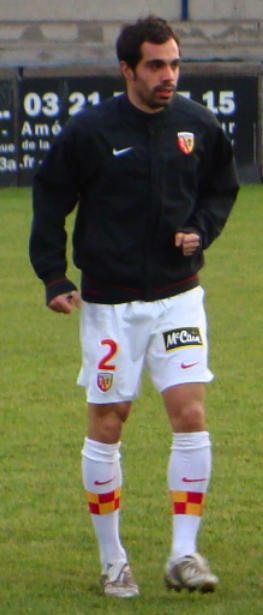
- Ramos training with Lens in 2009

Personal information
- Full name: Marco Miguel Gonçalves Ramos
- Date of birth: 26 April 1983 (age 43)
- Place of birth: Levallois-Perret, France
- Height: 1.72 m (5 ft 8 in)
- Position: Left-back

Youth career
- 1998–2003: Monaco

Senior career*
Years	Team	Apps	(Gls)
2003–2005	Monaco	2	(0)
2004–2005	→ Créteil (loan)	29	(0)
2005–2006	Châteauroux	29	(0)
2006–2011	Lens	108	(0)
2011–2012	Braga	0	(0)
2012–2014	Auxerre	37	(0)
2016–2017	Sequeirense		

International career
2002	Portugal U19	5	(0)
- * Club domestic league appearances and goals

Marco Miguel Gonçalves Ramos (born 26 April 1983) is a Portuguese former professional footballer who played as a left-back.

== Club career ==
Born in Levallois-Perret, Hauts-de-Seine of Portuguese descent, Ramos began playing football with Monaco, reaching the club's youth academy at the age of 15. During his two-year spell with the first team he saw very little playing time, being barred at the full-back positions by Patrice Evra and Hugo Ibarra; he was also loaned to Créteil in Ligue 2 for the 2004–05 season, being released by Monaco at its closure.

After another season in the second division, with Châteauroux, Ramos signed for Lens, where he would experience the most steady period of his career, being a starter in three of his five years and notably contributing with 35 games (33 starts) as the Sang et Or returned to Ligue 1 after winning the 2009 second level championship, being included in the Team of the Year.

Midway through 2010–11, Ramos joined Braga of Portugal on a two-year contract. During his stint with the Minho side, his output consisted of a match against Arouca for the campaign's domestic League Cup (70 minutes played, 4–0 away win).

On 27 July 2012, Ramos returned to his country of birth and joined division two club Auxerre for two seasons.

== International career ==
Ramos gained the first of his five caps for the Portugal under-19 team on 27 March 2002, in a 2–0 friendly win over Greece.
