= Laurent Lanteri =

French footballer (born 1984)

Personal information
- Date of birth: 2 November 1984 (age 41)
- Place of birth: Nice, France
- Height: 1.78 m (5 ft 10 in)
- Position: Forward

Youth career
- 1999–2002: Monaco

Senior career*
Years	Team	Apps	(Gls)
2002–2007	Monaco	2	(0)
2004–2006	→ Châteauroux (loan)	38	(7)
2006	→ Legnano (loan)	14	(5)
2006–2007	→ Metz (loan)	6	(0)
2007–2009	Legnano	41	(16)
2009–2012	Novara	13	(1)
2010	→ Cisco Roma (loan)	11	(6)
2011	→ Casale (loan)	14	(0)
2011–2012	→ Foggia (loan)	18	(3)
2012–2014	Siena	0	(0)
2012–2013	→ Andria (loan)	12	(1)
2013–2014	→ Paganese (loan)	12	(1)
- * Club domestic league appearances and goals as of end of 13–14 season

Laurent Lanteri (born 2 November 1984) is a French footballer.

== Career ==
=== Monaco ===
Lanteri started his career at Monégasque club AS Monaco FC, after played twice at Ligue 1, he went on loan to Ligue 2 club Châteauroux and Metz. At the 2nd half of 2005–06 season he also loaned to Legnano of Serie C2.

=== Legnano ===
In the summer of 2007, he returned to Legnano now at Serie C1, and in January 2009, transferred to fellow third division club Novara.

=== Novara ===
Lanteri was signed by Novara in January 2009 for free. He was sent off in his debut. The consequence was suspended two games.

In January 2010 he left for Cisco Roma on loan. Lanteri did not play any game in 2009–10 Lega Pro Prima Divisione. Lanteri played 4 times in 2010–11 Serie B. On 11 January 2011 he left for Casale. On 2 August 2011 he was signed by Foggia.

=== Siena ===
On 31 August 2012, Lanteri signed for A.C. Siena, with Francesco Parravicini moving in the opposite direction. Both players were "valued" for €1 million. Lanteri was immediately left for Andria in temporary deal for free. On 22 August 2013, he was signed by Paganese.

== Personal life ==
Lanteri was born in France to parents of Italian descent.
