= Jim Ablancourt =

Réunionese footballer (born 1983)

Personal information
- Date of birth: 3 July 1983 (age 43)
- Place of birth: Réunion
- Position: Defender

Senior career*
Years	Team	Apps	(Gls)
- US Stade Tamponnaise
2003–2004	Monaco	8	(0)
2004–2005	MFK Ružomberok		
- US Stade Tamponnaise
- * Club domestic league appearances and goals

Jim Ablancourt (born 3 July 1983) is a French former professional footballer who played as a defender.

== Early life ==
Ablancourt grew up in Saint-Pierre, a town in the French overseas department of Réunion.

== Career ==
=== Early career ===
At the age of 14, Ablancourt started training with the senior team of Réunionnese side US Stade Tamponnaise. After that, he signed for AS Monaco in the Ligue 1, where he made eight appearances. On 18 October 2003, he debuted for Monaco during a 1–1 draw with Auxerre. On 2 April 2004, he played for Monaco against Ajaccio, where he conceded three goals within 45 minutes before being substituted off, a moment he described as one of the worst in his career. Monaco went on to score three goals to make the game 3–3 but he never made another Ligue 1 appearance after that.

Besides the league, he also played for Monaco in the Coupe de France as well as the Coupe de la Ligue and was in the team that reached the final of the 2003-04 UEFA Champions League under 2018 FIFA World Cup-winning manager Didier Deschamps. In 2004, Ablancourt departed Monaco after his contract was not renewed.

=== Later career ===
After Monaco, Ablancourt signed for Slovak club MFK Ružomberok, who wanted to sign a central defender, through his agent, former Ligue 1 player Fabien Piveteau, who knew the then manager of MFK Ružomberok, Czech international Ľubomír Moravčík. The highest-paid player on the team, he experienced racism and returned to Reunion, even though Ružomberok did not want him to leave, with US Stade Tamponnaise. With Stade Tamponnaise, he won the Réunion Premier League ten times. By age 34, Ablancourt was retired from football.

== Personal life ==
He has one daughter.
