= Nicolas Raynier =

French footballer (born 1984)

Personal information
- Date of birth: 4 March 1984 (age 42)
- Place of birth: Carcassonne, France
- Height: 1.79 m (5 ft 10 in)
- Position: Striker

Youth career
- AS Monaco FC

Senior career*
Years	Team	Apps	(Gls)
1999–2004	AS Monaco FC	2	(0)
2004–2005	Lille OSC	0	(0)
2005–2006	FC Sète	24	(4)
2006–2013	Amiens SC	103	(17)
2013–2014	US Boulogne	28	(2)
2014–2015	Hyères	16	(3)
- * Club domestic league appearances and goals as of 10:32, 3 March 2018 (UTC)

Nicolas Raynier (born 4 March 1984) is a retired French football striker.

== Honours ==
Lille

- UEFA Intertoto Cup: 2004
