= Jérôme Rothen =

French footballer (born 1978)

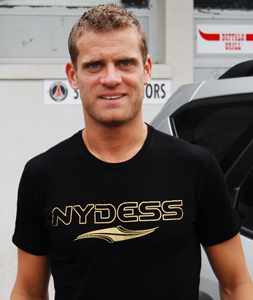
- Rothen in 2008

Personal information
- Full name: Jérôme René Marcel Rothen
- Date of birth: 31 March 1978 (age 48)
- Place of birth: Châtenay-Malabry, Hauts-de-Seine, France
- Height: 1.77 m (5 ft 10 in)
- Position: Winger

Youth career
- 1983–1988: AS Meudon
- 1988–1991: Versailles
- 1991–1994: INF Clairefontaine
- 1994–1997: Caen

Senior career*
Years	Team	Apps	(Gls)
1997–2000	Caen	98	(11)
2000–2002	Troyes	46	(4)
2002–2004	Monaco	82	(5)
2004–2010	Paris Saint-Germain	139	(10)
2009	→ Rangers (loan)	4	(0)
2010	→ Ankaragücü (loan)	12	(0)
2011–2013	Bastia	60	(7)
2013	Caen	8	(1)
Total		449	(38)

International career
2003–2007	France	13	(1)
- * Club domestic league appearances and goals

Jérôme René Marcel Rothen (born 31 March 1978) is a French former professional footballer who played as a winger. He is a football pundit.

Rothen won 13 caps for the France national football team. He represented his country at the UEFA Euro 2004 and won the FIFA Confederations Cup with France in 2003. At club level, Rothen won the Coupe de France once and the Coupe de la Ligue twice with Paris Saint-Germain. He also won the Coupe de la Ligue with Monaco. Rothen was a skilled winger who specialised in free kicks, crossing and passing.

== Club career ==
=== Early career ===
Rothen underwent training at the famous Clairefontaine Football Academy in France.

He started his career with Caen. He then moved to Troyes AC where he played under manager Alain Perrin.

=== Monaco ===
Rothen was bought by AS Monaco on 1 January 2002 for €5 million. With Monaco, Rothen won the Coupe de la Ligue in 2003. He also helped the club reach the final of the Champions League in May 2004, where they lost to FC Porto 3–0.

=== Paris Saint-Germain ===
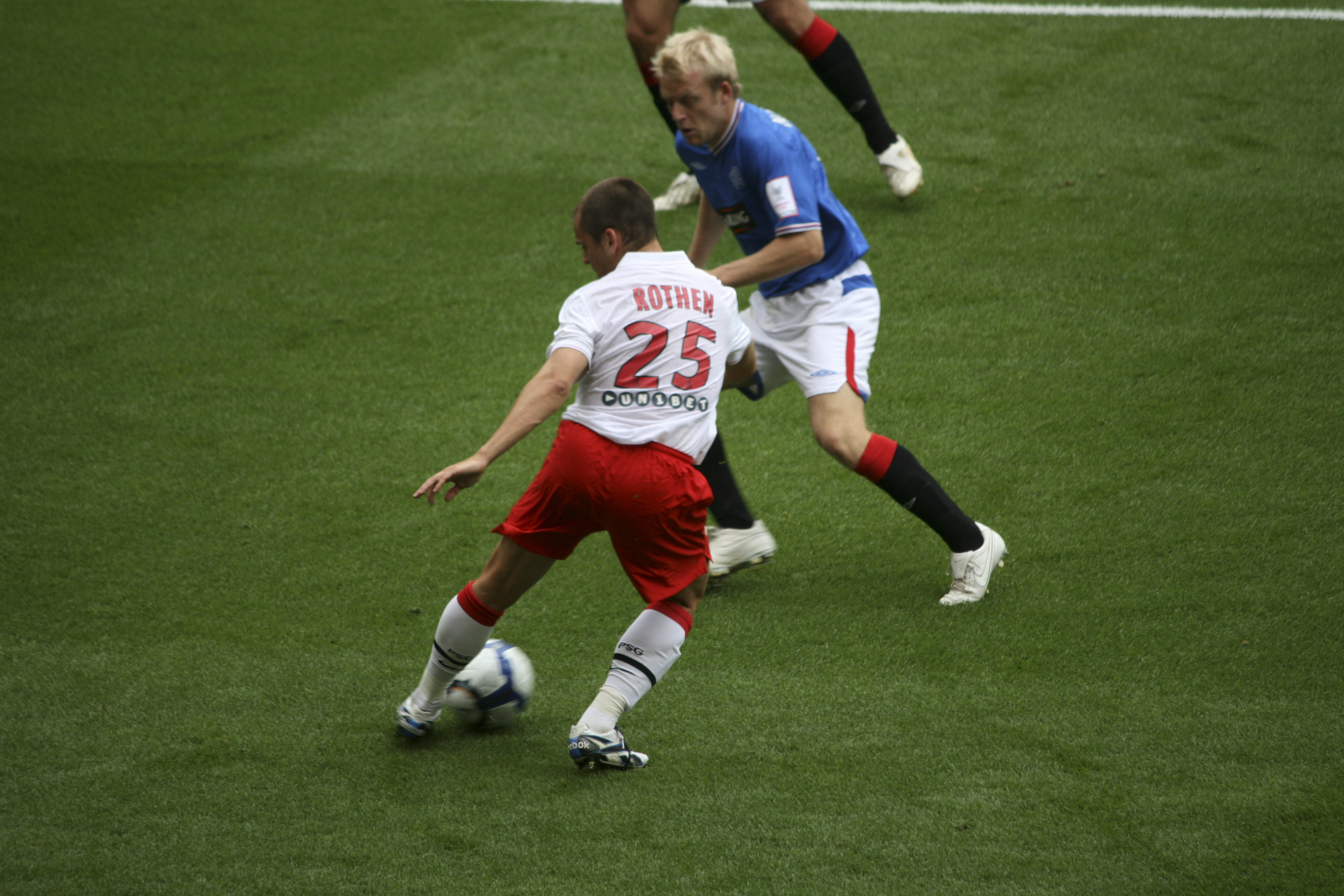
Rothen playing for PSG in 2009.

A native of the Paris metropolitan area, Rothen fulfilled a childhood dream when he signed for the capital side Paris Saint-Germain in 2004 for €11 million. He rejected lucrative offers from more powerful European clubs such as Manchester United, Chelsea and Valencia in order to join PSG, the club he supported during his youth.

In the French capital, his dream soon turned sour. Often injured, Rothen appeared in only 18 league games and 2 Champions League fixtures in his debut season. 2005-06 was equally disappointing. Under the orders of Laurent Fournier and then Guy Lacombe, the left winger struggled to reproduce the kind of displays that had made him famous at Monaco. Often injured, he nonetheless took part in a Coupe de France win over fierce rivals Olympique de Marseille.

In the second half of 2006, returning from injury, Rothen found himself cast aside by Guy Lacombe. In December 2006, he faked an injury in order to organize a transfer deal that would materialize during the January transfer window. He was then tipped to join Lille OSC, but then learned about Lacombe's imminent sacking from Paris Saint-Germain. The arrival of new coach Paul Le Guen in January 2007 convinced him to stay put. Gradually, he began to recover his best form. With the club battling against relegation, Rothen's revival was one of the factors that enabled PSG to save their spot in the top flight.

In the summer of 2007, several clubs expressed interest for the midfielder, including champions Olympique Lyonnais, who were looking for a replacement for the outgoing Florent Malouda. Rothen stayed in Paris, and following a great start to the 2007–08 season, was voted as the league's player of the month in September. He regained a spot in the France national football team and even netted a free-kick on 13 October 2007 against the Faroe Islands.

In 2007–08, Paris Saint-Germain struggled even more than the previous season. In such a context, Rothen became an increasingly important player due to his creativity and crossing ability. Such was his importance to the club that French media would describe PSG as "dependent upon Rothen" and "playing a game that is excessively left-sided", the flank which the player occupied. During those years, several signings like Sergey Semak, Bonaventure Kalou and Williamis Souza were made with the aim of reducing the side's dependence on Rothen and introduce some kind of creative threat on the right flank too. None of these solutions worked, and PSG continued to rely upon Rothen to pull them out of the relegation trap in May 2008.

2008-09 was his last season in Paris. He managed to make 34 league appearances, his best tally in a single season since 2003–04 in Monaco at AS Monaco. However, he had lost much of his importance to the club, with the arrival of other creative players such as Stéphane Sessègnon and former Monaco teammate Ludovic Giuly. In the summer of 2009, Paul Le Guen left the club to be replaced by Antoine Kombouaré, who deemed Rothen surplus to requirements and banished him to the reserves squad.

=== Rangers ===
On 1 September 2009, Rothen agreed to join Scottish Premier League club Rangers on a one-year loan deal from PSG. He made his debut for the club on 12 September 2009 against Motherwell. He made his first appearance in the Champions league for Rangers in their 1–1 draw away to Stuttgart.

=== Ankaragücü ===
After going back to France Rothen's relationship with Rangers soured and the club were looking to move Rothen on, as he was deemed surplus to requirements, rather than pay his salary for the remainder of the season when it looked like he would not figure in the squad.

Rothen flew to Turkey on 22 January 2010 to sign a six-month loan deal with Ankaragücü after rejecting advances from Greek sides AEL, Kavala and Iraklis. On 29 January 2010, he signed a six-month contract with Ankaragücü.

=== Bastia ===
Almost a year after Paris resigned his contract, Rothen signed in May 2011 a two-year contract with the Corsican club of SC Bastia, newly promoted to the French Ligue 2. Rothen made his team debut on 29 July 2011 against Istres, and Bastia won the match 3–1. He won the Ligue 2 title with the team in the 2011-12 season and was selected as the Ligue 2 Player of the Year.

=== Return to Caen ===
In July 2013, Rothen rejoined his first senior club, Caen. On 1 January 2014, he announced his retirement from football.

== International career ==
Rothen made his debut on 29 March 2003 against Malta.

He was a member of the France national football team at Euro 2004, where he made a brief substitute appearance in their defeat by Greece in the quarter-finals. Rothen was not selected in the 2006 FIFA World Cup squad for France. He was recalled to the squad for Euro 2008 qualifying and, on 10 October 2007, marked his comeback with a superbly taken free-kick against the Faroe Islands, the last scored free-kick for France as of 13 June 2015.

== Autobiography ==
On 8 October 2008, Rothen published his autobiography You're Not Going To Believe Me. The book has generated significant attention in the media, notably for its description of an incident concerning Zinedine Zidane, his former teammate in the France national team.

According to Rothen, the incident occurred during the second leg of Monaco's 2004 Champions League quarter-final win over Real Madrid. Monaco had overturned a 4–2 first leg deficit, and were 3–1 up with seconds left to play when Zidane tackled Rothen from behind. "It was a foul and I went down, admittedly I made a bit more of it, but anyone would have done the same, as we were trying to buy some seconds," Rothen wrote. "Zidane leant over me and said: 'Get up, you son of a bitch.'"

The expression Rothen claims Zidane used, 'fils de pute', is a variation on what Marco Materazzi is alleged to have said to Zidane before the head-butt that proved the iconic moment of the 2006 World Cup final. "I was surprised but put it down to his frustration, and I expected him to apologise at the end of the game, but he said nothing," Rothen continued. "I thought the next time we saw each other with the France team he would say sorry, and then it would be forgotten, but he didn't and that disappointed me."

In a subsequent interview with the French newspaper L'Équipe, Rothen stated he did not intend to smear Zidane's image by publicizing the incident. He also denies having received pressure from the latter's camp to remove the offending passage, as had been reported in the press.

== Career statistics ==
=== Club ===
Appearances and goals by club, season and competition
Club	Season	League			National cup (Note: Includes Coupe de France)		League cup (Note: Includes Coupe de la Ligue, Scottish League Cup)		Europe		Other		Total	
Club	Season	Division	Apps	Goals	Apps	Goals	Apps	Goals	Apps	Goals	Apps	Goals	Apps	Goals
Caen	1997–98	Division 2	23	3	3	0	0	0	–		–		26	3
Caen	1998–99	Division 2	37	5	0	0	2	0	–		–		39	5
Caen	1999–2000	Division 2	38	3	0	0	1	0	–		–		39	3
Caen	Total		98	11	3	0	3	0	–		–		114	11
Troyes	2000–01	Division 1	30	4	5	0	3	0	–		–		38	4
Troyes	2001–02	Division 1	16	0	1	0	1	0	12	2	–		30	2
Troyes	Total		46	4	6	0	4	0	12	2	–		68	6
Monaco	2001–02	Division 1	11	1	3	0	1	0	–		–		15	1
Monaco	2002–03	Ligue 1	37	4	1	0	4	0	–		–		42	4
Monaco	2003–04	Ligue 1	34	0	3	0	0	0	12 (Note: Appearances in UEFA Champions League)	1	–		49	1
Monaco	Total		82	5	7	0	5	0	12	1	–		106	6
Paris Saint-Germain	2004–05	Ligue 1	18	1	1	0	0	0	2	0	1 (Note: Appearance in Trophée des champions)	0	22	1
Paris Saint-Germain	2005–06	Ligue 1	28	1	4	0	1	0	–		–		33	1
Paris Saint-Germain	2006–07	Ligue 1	27	2	3	0	1	0	4 (Note: Appearances in UEFA Cup)	0	1	1	36	3
Paris Saint-Germain	2007–08	Ligue 1	32	3	3	0	5	1	–		–		40	4
Paris Saint-Germain	2008–09	Ligue 1	34	3	2	0	3	0	10	1	–		49	4
Paris Saint-Germain	Total		139	10	13	0	10	1	16	1	2	1	180	13
Paris Saint-Germain II	2009–10	Championnat National U19	1	0	–		–		–		–		1	0
Rangers	2009–10	Scottish Premier League	4	0	0	0	1	0	3	0	–		8	0
Ankaragücü	2009–10	Süper Lig	12	0	0	0	–		–		–		12	0
Paris Saint-Germain II	2010–11	Championnat National U19	2	0	–		–		–		–		2	0
Bastia	2011–12	Ligue 2	32	4	2	1	1	0	–		–		35	5
Bastia	2012–13	Ligue 1	28	3	0	0	2	0	–		–		30	3
Bastia	Total		60	7	2	1	3	0	–		–		65	8
Career total			414	35	31	1	26	1	43	4	2	1	516	41

=== International ===
Appearances and goals by national team and year
National team	Year	Apps	Goals
France	2003	3	0
France	2004	4	0
France	2005	4	0
France	2006	0	0
France	2007	2	1
Total		13	1

== Honours ==
Troyes

- UEFA Intertoto Cup: 2001

Monaco

- Coupe de la Ligue: 2002–03
- UEFA Champions League runner-up: 2003–04

Paris Saint-Germain

- Coupe de France: 2005–06; runner-up: 2007–08
- Coupe de la Ligue: 2007–08
- Trophée des Champions runner-up: 2004, 2006

Bastia

- Ligue 2: 2011–12

France

- FIFA Confederations Cup: 2003

Individual

- Ligue 2 Team of the Year: 1999–2000, 2011–12
- Ligue 1 Team of the Year: 2002–03
- LFP Player of the Month: February 2003
- UNFP Player of the Month: September 2007 (Ligue 1), February 2012 (Ligue 2)
- Ligue 2 Player of the Year: 2011–12
