= Stéphane Porato =

French footballer (born 1973)

Personal information
- Full name: Stéphane Patrick Porato
- Date of birth: 19 September 1973 (age 53)
- Place of birth: Colombes, Hauts-de-Seine, France
- Height: 1.83 m (6 ft 0 in)
- Position: Goalkeeper

Youth career
- RC Paris
- 1989–1992: Toulon

Senior career*
Years	Team	Apps	(Gls)
1992–1993	Toulon	2	(0)
1993–1998	Monaco	19	(0)
1998–2000	Marseille	59	(0)
2000–2004	Monaco	37	(0)
2002–2003	→ Créteil-Lusitanos (loan)	26	(0)
2004–2006	Ajaccio	68	(0)
2006–2007	Alavés	22	(0)
2007–2009	Xerez	33	(0)
Total		266	(0)

International career
1999	France	1	(0)
- * Club domestic league appearances and goals

Stéphane Patrick Porato (born 19 September 1973) is a French former professional footballer who played as a goalkeeper.

== Career ==
In his country Porato represented Sporting Toulon, AS Monaco FC, Olympique de Marseille (where he played in the 1999 UEFA Cup Final), US Créteil-Lusitanos and AC Ajaccio, mainly as a backup or starting in the second division. On 13 November 1999 he earned his sole cap for France, appearing in a 3–0 friendly win with Croatia.

In late October 2006, as he had already moved to Spain with second level's Deportivo Alavés, following Ajaccio's relegation from Ligue 1, Porato had a trial at Chelsea in view of signing as third-choice after the long-term skull injury to Petr Čech. Eventually, nothing came of it.

Porato joined Xerez CD, in the same country and tier, for the 2007–08 season. A starter in his first year, he lost the job in the following as the Andalusians achieved a first-ever La Liga promotion, being released in July 2009.

== Honours ==
Monaco

- Trophée des Champions: 2000
