= Julien Rodriguez =

French former professional footballer (born 1978)

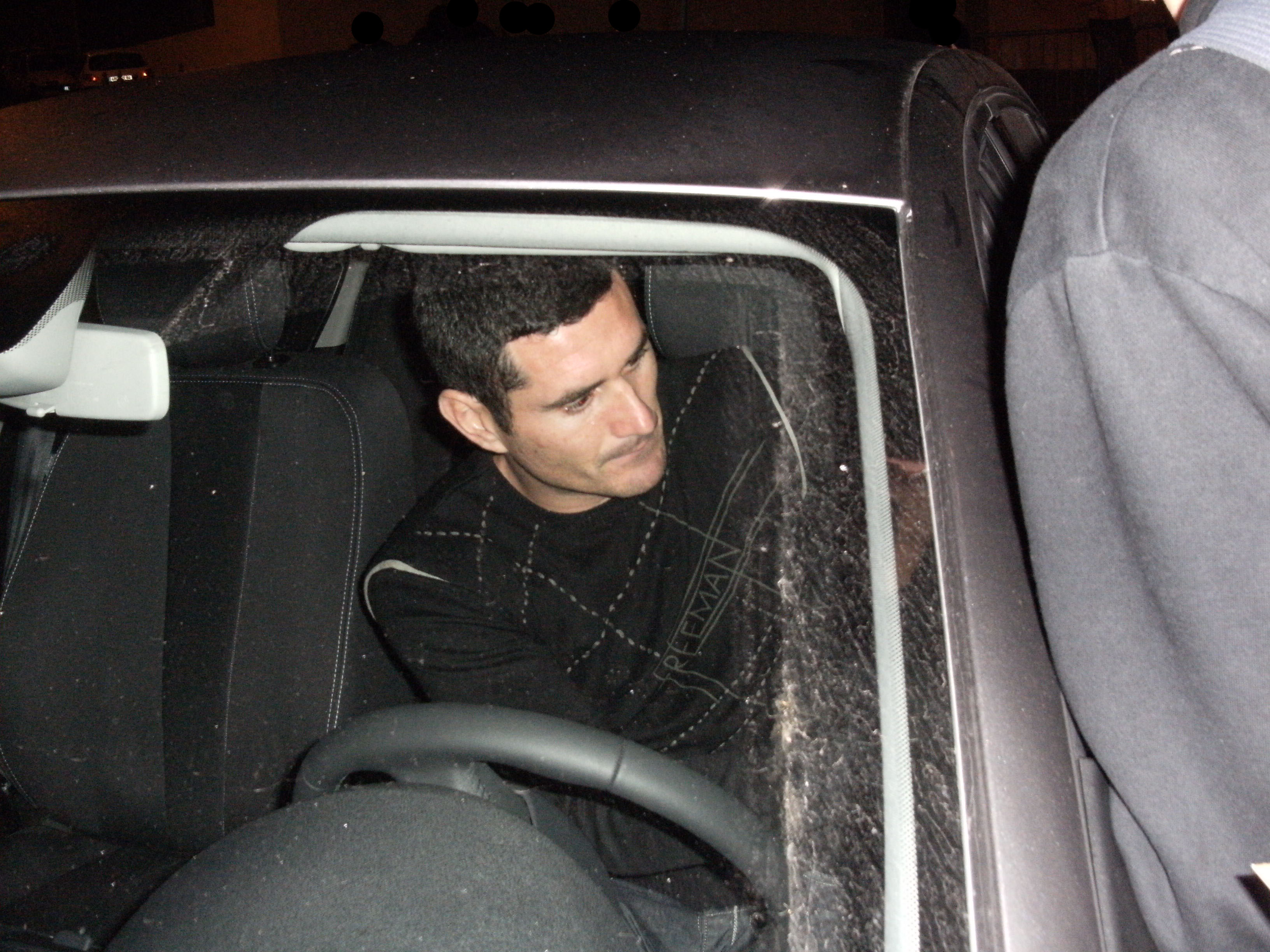
- Rodriguez in 2009

Personal information
- Full name: Julien Rodriguez
- Date of birth: 11 June 1978 (age 48)
- Place of birth: Béziers, France
- Height: 1.85 m (6 ft 1 in)
- Position: Centre back

Senior career*
Years	Team	Apps	(Gls)
1997–2005	Monaco	154	(3)
2005–2007	Rangers	34	(1)
2007–2012	Marseille	42	(3)
Total		230	(7)
- * Club domestic league appearances and goals

Julien Rodriguez (born 11 June 1978) is a French former professional footballer who played as a defender.

== Career ==
Born in Béziers, France, Rodriguez started his career at AS Monaco, making 135 appearances for the club and helping them win the Coupe de la Ligue in 2002–03 and reach the 2004 Champions League final. He joined Scottish Premier League club Rangers in August 2005 for £1 million. He scored his first goal for Rangers on 11 March 2006 in Rangers' 4–0 victory over Kilmarnock at Ibrox Stadium and made a total of 30 appearances in his debut season with the club. Having been expected to be an important member of the Rangers team under the management of fellow Frenchman Paul Le Guen in season 2006–07, Le Guen's reign as manager was short and unsuccessful.

After the appointment of Le Guen's replacement Walter Smith in January 2007, Rodriguez was transferred to Marseille.

Rodriguez received a call-up to the France national football team in 2007, but did not play.
