= 2013–14 FC Girondins de Bordeaux season =

Bordeaux
2013–14 season
- Chairman: Jean-Louis Triaud
- Manager: Francis Gillot (until 23 May 2014); Willy Sagnol (from 23 May 2014)
- Stadium: Stade Chaban-Delmas
- Ligue 1: 7th
- Coupe de France: Quarter-finals
- Coupe de la Ligue: Round of 32
- Trophée des Champions: Runners-up
- UEFA Europa League: Group stage
- Top goalscorer: League: Cheick Diabaté (11); All: Cheick Diabaté & Jussiê (11)
- Highest home attendance: 32,158 vs Monaco (10 August 2013)
- Lowest home attendance: 7,329 vs Maccabi Tel Aviv (3 October 2013)
- Average home league attendance: 18,427 (in all competitions)
Home colours	Away colours	Third colours

The 2013–14 FC Girondins de Bordeaux season was the 133rd professional season of the club since its creation in 1881. During the campaign, the club competed in Ligue 1, the top level of French football, along with the Coupe de France, the Coupe de la Ligue the Trophée des Champions and the UEFA Europa League.

== Players ==
=== First team squad ===
French teams are limited to four players without EU citizenship. Hence, the squad list includes only the principal nationality of each player; several non-European players on the squad have dual citizenship with an EU country. Also, players from the ACP countries—countries in Africa, the Caribbean, and the Pacific that are signatories to the Cotonou Agreement—are not counted against non-EU quotas due to the Kolpak ruling.

Note: Flags indicate national team as defined under FIFA eligibility rules; some limited exceptions apply. Players may hold more than one non-FIFA nationality.

No.	Pos.	Nation	Player
1	GK	SLO	Ažbe Jug
3	DF	BRA	Henrique
5	DF	FRA	Jérémie Bréchet
6	DF	SEN	Ludovic Sané (captain)
7	MF	CMR	Landry N'Guémo
9	FW	URU	Diego Rolán
10	FW	SEN	Henri Saivet
11	FW	FRA	David Bellion
13	FW	FRA	Guillaume Hoarau
14	FW	MLI	Cheick Diabaté
15	MF	FRA	Younés Kaabouni
16	GK	FRA	Cédric Carrasso
17	MF	GAB	André Biyogo Poko

No.	Pos.	Nation	Player
19	MF	FRA	Nicolas Maurice-Belay
20	FW	BRA	Jussiê
21	DF	FRA	Matthieu Chalmé
22	DF	MTQ	Julien Faubert
23	DF	ARG	Lucas Orbán
24	MF	MLI	Abdou Traoré
25	DF	BRA	Mariano
26	MF	CRO	Grégory Sertic (vice-captain)
27	DF	FRA	Marc Planus
29	DF	FRA	Maxime Poundjé
30	GK	MTQ	Kevin Olimpa
31	FW	BEN	David Djigla
--	DF	FRA	Théo Pellenard

Source: Ligue 1, FCGB

=== Out on loan ===
Note: Flags indicate national team as defined under FIFA eligibility rules; some limited exceptions apply. Players may hold more than one non-FIFA nationality.

No.	Pos.	Nation	Player
--	MF	ARG	Rodrigo Castro (at Red Star)
--	MF	CZE	Jaroslav Plašil (at Catania)
--	FW	FRA	Hadi Sacko (at Le Havre)

No.	Pos.	Nation	Player
--	FW	ARG	Emiliano Sala (at Chamois Niortais)
--	DF	SRB	Vujadin Savić (at Arminia Bielefeld)

=== Transfers ===
==== Transfers in ====
Date	Pos.	Player	Age	Moved from	Fee	Notes
1 July 2013	DF	(France) Jérémie Bréchet	33	(France) Troyes	Free Transfer	
31 July 2013	DF	(Argentina) Lucas Orbán	24	(Mexico) Tigre	£3,080,000	
4 January 2014	FW	(France) Guillaume Hoarau	29	(China) Dalian Aerbin	Free Transfer	

==== Transfers out ====
Date	Pos.	Player	Age	Moved to	Fee	Notes
1 July 2013	GK	(France) Abdoulaye Keita	22	(France) Paris Alesia	Free Transfer	
1 July 2013	MF	(France) Evan Chevalier	21	(France) Vendée Poiré-sur-Vie	Free Transfer	
9 July 2013	FW	(France) Anthony Modeste	25	(Germany) 1899 Hoffenheim	£2,650,000	
12 July 2013	DF	(France) Benoît Trémoulinas	27	(Ukraine) Dynamo Kyiv	£5,720,000	
16 August 2013	DF	(France) Florian Marange	27	(England) Crystal Palace	Free Transfer	
28 January 2014	MF	(Tunisia) Fahid Ben Khalfallah	31	(France) Troyes	Free Transfer	
31 January 2014	MF	(Poland) Ludovic Obraniak	29	(Germany) Werder Bremen	£1,300,000	

Last updated: 29 January 2015.

== Squad statistics ==
=== Top scorers ===
Place	Position	Nationality	Number	Name	Ligue 1	Coupe de la Ligue	Coup de France	UEFA Europa League	Trophée des Champions	Total
1	FW	(Mali)	14	Cheick Diabaté	11	0	0	0	0	11
1	FW	(Brazil)	20	Jussiê	9	0	1	1	0	11
3	FW	(France)	10	Henri Saivet	6	1	0	0	1	8
4	MF	(Poland)	-	Ludovic Obraniak	4	0	0	0	0	4
4	DF	(Brazil)	3	Henrique	2	0	1	1	0	4
6	MF	(France)	19	Nicolas Maurice-Belay	3	0	0	0	0	3
6	FW	(France)	13	Guillaume Hoarau	3	0	0	0	0	3
6	DF	(Martinique)	22	Julien Faubert	3	0	0	0	0	3
6	MF	(Croatia)	26	Grégory Sertic	3	0	0	0	0	3
10	DF	(Senegal)	6	Ludovic Sané	0	0	0	2	0	2
10	FW	(Uruguay)	9	Diego Rolán	2	0	0	0	0	2
12	MF	(Cameroon)	7	Landry N'Guémo	1	0	0	0	0	1
12	MF	(Mali)	24	Abdou Traoré	1	0	0	0	0	1
12	MF	(Gabon)	17	André Biyogo Poko	0	0	1	0	0	1
12	FW	(France)	11	David Bellion	0	1	0	0	0	1
TOTALS					48	2	3	4	1	58

Last updated: 29 January 2015
Source: Competitions
Competitive matches only

=== Disciplinary record ===
Number	Nationality	Position	Name	Ligue 1		Coupe de la Ligue		Coupe de France		UEFA Europa League		Trophée des Champions		Total	
Number	Nationality	Position	Name	Yellow card	Red card	Yellow card	Red card	Yellow card	Red card	Yellow card	Red card	Yellow card	Red card	Yellow card	Red card
29	(France)	DF	Maxime Poundjé	2	3	0	0	0	0	1	0	0	0	3	3
23	(Argentina)	DF	Lucas Orbán	3	1*	1	0	0	0	0	1	0	0	4	2
24	(Mali)	MF	Abdou Traoré	1	1*	1	0	1	0	1	0	0	0	4	1
7	(Cameroon)	MF	Landry N'Guémo	2	0	0	0	0	0	0	1*	1	0	3	1
27	(France)	DF	Marc Planus	2	1	0	0	0	0	0	0	0	0	2	1
21	(France)	DF	Matthieu Chalmé	1	0	0	0	0	0	0	1*	0	0	1	1
3	(Brazil)	DF	Henrique	10	0	0	0	1	0	0	0	0	0	11	0
6	(Senegal)	DF	Ludovic Sané	4	0	0	0	0	0	2	0	0	0	6	0
19	(France)	MF	Nicolas Maurice-Belay	4	0	0	0	0	0	1	0	0	0	5	0
-	(Poland)	MF	Ludovic Obraniak	4	0	0	0	0	0	1	0	0	0	5	0
14	(Mali)	FW	Cheick Diabaté	4	0	0	0	0	0	0	0	0	0	4	0
22	(Martinique)	DF	Julien Faubert	2	0	1	0	0	0	1	0	0	0	4	0
25	(Brazil)	DF	Mariano	3	0	0	0	0	0	0	0	0	0	3	0
26	(Croatia)	MF	Grégory Sertic	3	0	0	0	0	0	0	0	0	0	3	0
17	(Gabon)	MF	André Biyogo Poko	2	0	0	0	1	0	0	0	0	0	3	0
20	(Brazil)	FW	Jussiê	2	0	0	0	0	0	0	0	0	0	2	0
9	(Uruguay)	FW	Diego Rolán	1	0	0	0	0	0	1	0	0	0	2	0
-	(France)	DF	Théo Pellenard	1	0	0	0	0	0	0	0	0	0	1	0
-	(France)	FW	Hadi Sacko	1	0	0	0	0	0	0	0	0	0	1	0
5	(France)	DF	Jérémie Bréchet	0	0	0	0	0	0	1	0	0	0	1	0
-	(Tunisia)	MF	Fahid Ben Khalfallah	0	0	0	0	0	0	1	0	0	0	1	0
-	(France)	FW	Enzo Crivelli	0	0	1	0	0	0	0	0	0	0	1	0
			TOTALS	52	6	4	0	3	0	10	3	1	0	70	9

Last updated:29 January 2015
Source: Competitions
Competitive matches only
* indicates a second yellow card ( (yellow card) (yellow-red card) )

== Competitions ==
=== Trophée des Champions ===
3 August 2013	Paris Saint-Germain	2–1	Bordeaux	Libreville, Gabon
19:45 CEST (UTC+02:00)	Motta (yellow card) 46'; Matuidi (yellow card) 78'; Ongenda 81'; Alex 90+3'	Report	N'Guémo (yellow card) 45+2'; Saivet 38'	Stadium: Stade d'Angondjé; Attendance: 34,658; Referee: Jérôme Efong Nzolo (Belgium); Man of the Match: Christophe Jallet

=== Ligue 1 ===
==== League table ====
Pos	Team	Pld	W	D	L	GF	GA	GD	Pts	Qualification or relegation
5	Lyon	38	17	10	11	56	44	+12	61	Qualification for the Europa League third qualifying round
6	Marseille	38	16	12	10	53	40	+13	60	
7	Bordeaux	38	13	14	11	49	43	+6	53	
8	Lorient	38	13	10	15	48	53	−5	49	
9	Toulouse	38	12	13	13	46	53	−7	49	

Source: Ligue 1
Rules for classification: 1) Points; 2) Goal difference; 3) Number of goals scored

==== Results summary ====
Overall								Home						Away					
Pld	W	D	L	GF	GA	GD	Pts	W	D	L	GF	GA	GD	W	D	L	GF	GA	GD
38	13	14	11	49	43	+6	53	10	4	5	31	20	+11	3	10	6	18	23	−5

Last updated: 19 January 2015.
Source: Competitive matches

==== Results by round ====
Round	1	2	3	4	5	6	7	8	9	10	11	12	13	14	15	16	17	18	19	20	21	22	23	24	25	26	27	28	29	30	31	32	33	34	35	36	37	38
Ground	H	A	H	A	H	A	H	A	H	A	H	A	H	A	H	A	H	H	A	H	A	H	A	A	H	H	A	H	A	H	A	H	A	H	A	A	H	A
Result	L	D	W	L	L	D	D	D	W	D	W	W	L	D	W	W	W	W	D	L	L	W	L	L	W	W	L	L	D	D	D	D	D	W	L	W	D	D
Position	18	16	10	14	16	16	18	17	15	15	13	11	12	12	8	7	6	5	5	7	8	7	8	8	7	7	8	8	9	9	9	7	7	7	7	7	7	7

Source: Ligue1
A = Away; H = Home; W = Win; D = Draw; L = Loss

==== Matches ====
Win Draw Loss

10 August 2013 1	Bordeaux	0–2	Monaco	Bordeaux
21:00 CEST (UTC+02:00)	Planus (yellow card) 90+2'	Report	Rivière 82'; Falcao 87'	Stadium: Stade Chaban-Delmas; Attendance: 32,158; Referee: Laurent Duhamel

17 August 2013 2	Toulouse	1–1	Bordeaux	Toulouse
20:00 CEST (UTC+02:00)	Ben Basat (yellow card) 8', (goal) 45'; Abdennour (yellow card) 58'; Aurier (yellow card) 86'	Report	Poundjé (yellow card) 11'; Planus (red card) 28'	Stadium: Stadium Municipal; Attendance: 13,111; Referee: Tony Chapron

24 August 2013 3	Bordeaux	1–0	Bastia	Bordeaux
20:00 CEST (UTC+02:00)	Saivet 32'; Henrique (yellow card) 52'; Diabaté (yellow card) 80'	Report	Palmieri (yellow card) 52'; Yatabaré (yellow card) 88'	Stadium: Stade Chaban-Delmas; Attendance: 15,240; Referee: Wilfried Bien

1 September 2013 4	Saint-Étienne	2–1	Bordeaux	Saint-Étienne
20:00 CEST (UTC+02:00)	Hamouma 7'; Lemoine (yellow card) 40'; Perrin 50'; Clément (yellow card) 59'	Report	Maurice-Belay (yellow card) 32'; Obraniak 90'	Stadium: Stade Geoffroy-Guichard; Attendance: 26,091; Referee: Benoît Millot

13 September 2013 5	Bordeaux	0–2	Paris Saint-Germain	Bordeaux
20:30 CEST (UTC+02:00)	Henrique (yellow card) 20'; Obraniak (yellow card) 41'	Report	Matuidi 30'; Lucas 64'; Ongenda (yellow card) 69'; Verratti (yellow card) 80'	Stadium: Stade Chaban-Delmas; Attendance: 29,548; Referee: Antony Gautier

22 September 2013 6	Lorient	3–3	Bordeaux	Lorient
14:00 CEST (UTC+02:00)	Aboubakar 23'; Monnet-Paquet 44'; Diallo 58'; Jouffre (yellow card) 60'	Report	Diabaté 8' (pen.); Sertic 24'; Saivet 30'; Poundjé (yellow card) 53'; Maurice-Belay (yellow card) 71'	Stadium: Stade du Moustoir; Attendance: 14,038; Referee: Benoît Bastien

25 September 2013 7	Bordeaux	0–0	Reims	Bordeaux
19:00 CEST (UTC+02:00)	Henrique (yellow card) 29'	Report	Ca (yellow card) 31'; Devaux (yellow card) 87'	Stadium: Stade Chaban-Delmas; Attendance: 13,282; Referee: Alexandre Castro

28 September 2013 8	Evian	1–1	Bordeaux	Annecy
20:00 CEST (UTC+02:00)	Bérigaud 25'; Benezet (yellow card) 49'; Barbosa (yellow card) 58'; Bertoglio (yellow card) 90+4'	Report	Sané (yellow card) 40'; Diabaté 69'; Maurice-Belay (yellow card) 74'; N'Guémo (yellow card) 79'; Poundjé (red card) 81'	Stadium: Parc des Sports; Attendance: 9,846; Referee: Mikael Lesage

6 October 2013 9	Bordeaux	4–1	Sochaux	Bordeaux
17:00 CEST (UTC+02:00)	Henrique (yellow card) 13'; Saivet 21' (pen.); Jussiê 39'; Diabaté 70', 89'; Obraniak (yellow card) 71'; Chalmé (yellow card) 89'	Report	Contout 17'; Pouplin (yellow card) 21'; Prcić (yellow card) 66'	Stadium: Stade Chaban-Delmas; Attendance: 12,823; Referee: Philippe Kalt

20 October 2013 10	Lyon	1–1	Bordeaux	Lyon
21:00 CEST (UTC+02:00)	Biševac (yellow card) 38'; Lacazette (yellow card) 41' (yellow-red card) 67'; Briand 90+2'	Report	Diabaté (yellow card) 38'; Obraniak 62'; N'Guémo (yellow card) 65'	Stadium: Stade de Gerland; Attendance: 36,774; Referee: Nicolas Rainville

27 October 2013 11	Bordeaux	2–0	Montpellier	Bordeaux
14:00 CEST (UTC+02:00)	Traoré (yellow card) 11'; Rolán (yellow card) 21'; Mariano (yellow card) 45+1'; Diabaté 75'; Obraniak 90'	Report	Jebbour (red card) 19'	Stadium: Stade Chaban-Delmas; Attendance: 15,972; Referee: Tony Chapron

3 November 2013 12	Nice	1–2	Bordeaux	Nice
14:00 CET (UTC+01:00)	Mendy (yellow card) 38'; Cvitanich (yellow card) 72', (goal) 77' (pen.); Bodmer (yellow card) 83'	Report	Jussiê (yellow card) 25'; Sertic 31'; Obraniak 59'; Orbán (yellow card) 76'	Stadium: Allianz Riviera; Attendance: 27,511; Referee: Benoît Millot

10 November 2013 13	Bordeaux	0–3	Nantes	Bordeaux
14:00 CET (UTC+01:00)	Sertic (yellow card) 68'	Report	Alhadhur (yellow card) 15'; Bessat 41'; Djilobodji 60'; Đorđević 64'; Veretout (yellow card) 76'	Stadium: Stade Chaban-Delmas; Attendance: 24,160; Referee: Fredy Fautrel

23 November 2013 14	Rennes	1–1	Bordeaux	Rennes
20:00 CET (UTC+01:00)	Kana-Biyik 63'	Report	Diabaté 64'; Henrique (yellow card) 90+1'	Stadium: Stade de la Route de Lorient; Attendance: 15,465; Referee: Antony Gautier

1 December 2013 15	Bordeaux	4–0	Ajaccio	Bordeaux
14:00 CET (UTC+01:00)	Jussiê 8', 68'; Obraniak (yellow card) 15'; Orbán (yellow card) 39'; Sertic 50'; Maurice-Belay 54'	Report	Belghazouani (yellow card) 20'; Lasne (yellow card) 39'; Hengbart (yellow card) 42'; Cavalli (yellow card) 89'	Stadium: Stade Chaban-Delmas; Attendance: 11,399; Referee: Ruddy Buquet

4 December 2013 16	Guingamp	0–1	Bordeaux	Guingamp
19:00 CET (UTC+01:00)	Martins Pereira (yellow card) 85'; Beauvue (red card) 90+1'	Report	Faubert 26'; Orbán (yellow card) 51' (yellow-red card) 54'; Sacko (yellow card) 90+5'	Stadium: Stade du Roudourou; Attendance: 14,708; Referee: Sébastien Desiage

8 December 2013 17	Bordeaux	1–0	Lille	Bordeaux
14:00 CET (UTC+01:00)	N'Guémo 27'; Poundjé (red card) 57'	Report	Roux (yellow card) 54'	Stadium: Stade Chaban-Delmas; Attendance: 18,740; Referee: Nicolas Rainville

15 December 2013 18	Bordeaux	2–1	Valenciennes	Bordeaux
14:00 CET (UTC+01:00)	Jussiê 58' (pen.); Henrique (yellow card) 64'; Maurice-Belay 73'	Report	Bahebeck (yellow card) 27'; Doumbia 55'; Penneteau (yellow card) 65'	Stadium: Stade Chaban-Delmas; Attendance: 22,165; Referee: Mikael Lesage

22 December 2013 19	Marseille	2–2	Bordeaux	Marseille
14:00 CET (UTC+01:00)	Diawara (yellow card) 55'; Khalifa (yellow card) 62'; Romao 73'; Gignac 74'	Report	Jussiê 34'; Sané (yellow card) 40'; Maurice-Belay 66'	Stadium: Stade Vélodrome; Attendance: 38,720; Referee: Benoît Bastien

11 January 2014 20	Bordeaux	0–1	Toulouse	Bordeaux
20:00 CET (UTC+01:00)	Poundjé (red card) 34'; Mariano (yellow card) 44'; Obraniak (yellow card) 55'	Report	Spajić (red card) 24'; Braithwaite 53'; Didot (yellow card) 63'	Stadium: Stade Chaban-Delmas; Attendance: 15,058; Referee: Laurent Duhamel

18 January 2014 21	Bastia	1–0	Bordeaux	Bastia
20:00 CET (UTC+01:00)	Diakité (yellow card) 28'; Ba 42'; Cahuzac (yellow card) 79'	Report	Faubert (yellow card) 79'	Stadium: Stade Armand Cesari; Attendance: 13,953; Referee: Wilfried Bien

26 January 2014 22	Bordeaux	2–0	Saint-Étienne	Bordeaux
17:00 CET (UTC+01:00)	Traoré 41'; Henrique 51'	Report	Cohade (yellow card) 67'; Clerc (yellow card) 79'; Corgnet (yellow card) 82'; Brison (yellow card) 89'	Stadium: Stade Chaban-Delmas; Attendance: 19,824; Referee: Nicolas Rainville

31 January 2014 23	Paris Saint-Germain	2–0	Bordeaux	Paris
20:30 CET (UTC+01:00)	Ibrahimović 58'; Alex 88'	Report		Stadium: Parc des Princes; Attendance: 45,292; Referee: Tony Chapron

25 February 2014 24	Bordeaux	3–2	Lorient	Lorient
18:30 CET (UTC+01:00)	Saivet 27'; Diabaté 36'; Hoarau 72'	Report	Diallo 26'; Koné 84'	Stadium: Stade du Moustoir; Attendance: 12,779; Referee: Laurent Duhamel

15 February 2014 25	Reims	1–0	Bordeaux	Reims
20:00 CET (UTC+01:00)	De Préville 64'	Report	Sané (yellow card) 12'	Stadium: Stade Auguste Delaune; Attendance: 13,702; Referee: Lionel Jaffredo

22 February 2014 26	Bordeaux	2–1	Evian	Bordeaux
20:00 CET (UTC+01:00)	Faubert 52'; Pellenard (yellow card) 59'; Saivet 82'	Report	Angoula (yellow card) 53'; Bérigaud 73'; Koné (yellow card) 77'	Stadium: Stade Chaban-Delmas; Attendance: 12,465; Referee: Benoît Bastien

1 March 2014 27	Sochaux	2–0	Bordeaux	Montbéliard
20:00 CET (UTC+01:00)	Ayew 70'; Bakambu 82'; Roudet (yellow card) 84'	Report	Henrique (yellow card) 27'; Maurice-Belay (yellow card) 78'	Stadium: Stade Auguste Bonal; Attendance: 13,095; Referee: Sébastien Desiage

9 March 2014 28	Bordeaux	1–2	Lyon	Bordeaux
21:00 CET (UTC+01:00)	Saivet 7'; Orbán (yellow card) 12'; Planus (yellow card) 86'	Report	Gomis (yellow card) 27'; Bedimo 90+1'; Tolisso 90+4', (yellow card) 90+4'	Stadium: Stade Chaban-Delmas; Attendance: 17,660; Referee: Antony Gautier

16 March 2014 29	Montpellier	1–1	Bordeaux	Montpellier
14:00 CET (UTC+01:00)	Hilton 34', (yellow card) 65'; Marveaux (yellow card) 39'	Report	Henrique 24', (yellow card) 32'; Jussiê (yellow card) 61'; Biyogo Poko (yellow card) 73'	Stadium: Stade de la Mosson; Attendance: 14,018; Referee: Alexandre Castro

21 March 2014 30	Bordeaux	1–1	Nice	Bordeaux
20:00 CET (UTC+01:00)	Mariano (yellow card) 15'; Henrique (yellow card) 52'; Jussiê 63' (pen.); Traoré (yellow card) 84' (yellow-red card) 86'	Report	Bosetti 67'	Stadium: Stade Chaban-Delmas; Attendance: 15,175; Referee: Wilfried Bien

29 March 2014 31	Nantes	0–0	Bordeaux	Nantes
20:00 CEST (UTC+02:00)	Nicoliță (yellow card) 37'	Report	Sertic (yellow card) 82'	Stadium: Stade de la Beaujoire; Attendance: 25,031; Referee: Tony Chapron

5 April 2014 32	Bordeaux	2–2	Rennes	Bordeaux
20:00 CEST (UTC+02:00)	Hoarau 37'; Rolán 61'; Diabaté (yellow card) 90+2'	Report	Doucouré (yellow card) 47', (goal) 64'; Alessandrini 68'; Toivonen (yellow card) 85'; Grosicki (yellow card) 86'	Stadium: Stade Chaban-Delmas; Attendance: 19,776; Referee: Mikael Lesage

12 April 2014 33	Ajaccio	1–1	Bordeaux	Ajaccio
20:00 CEST (UTC+02:00)	Tonucci (yellow card) 47'; Mostefa 85'	Report	Sané (yellow card) 38'; Jussiê 62'	Stadium: Stade François Coty; Attendance: 6,319; Referee: Sébastien Desiage

20 April 2014 34	Bordeaux	5–1	Guingamp	Bordeaux
17:00 CEST (UTC+02:00)	Diabaté 8', 20', 26'; Jussiê 48'; Sertic (yellow card) 63'; Rolán 68' (pen.)	Report	Dialla 29', (yellow card) 60'; Dos Santos (yellow card) 52'; Cerdan (yellow card) 70'	Stadium: Stade Chaban-Delmas; Attendance: 18,046; Referee: Philippe Kalt

27 April 2014 35	Lille	2–1	Bordeaux	Lille
21:00 CEST (UTC+02:00)	Kalou 23'; Souaré (yellow card) 49'; Mendes 68'; Baša (yellow card) 83'	Report	Diabaté (yellow card) 34'; Jussiê 71' (pen.)	Stadium: Stade Pierre-Mauroy; Attendance: 40,644; Referee: Clément Turpin

4 May 2014 36	Valenciennes	0–1	Bordeaux	Valenciennes
17:00 CEST (UTC+02:00)	Enza Yamissi (yellow card) 51'; Pujol (yellow card) 76'	Report	Biyogo Poko (yellow card) 5'; Faubert 74'	Stadium: Stade du Hainaut; Attendance: 12,784; Referee: Stéphane Jochem

10 May 2014 37	Bordeaux	1–1	Marseille	Bordeaux
21:00 CEST (UTC+02:00)	Diabaté 66'; Faubert (yellow card) 73'; Henrique (yellow card) 90+3'	Report	Romao (yellow card) 23'; Cheyrou 32'	Stadium: Stade Chaban-Delmas; Attendance: 31,555; Referee: Benoît Millot

17 May 2014 38	Monaco	1–1	Bordeaux	Fontvieille, Monaco
21:00 CEST (UTC+02:00)	Berbatov (yellow card) 30'; Ocampos 69'	Report	Hoarau 15'	Stadium: Stade Louis II; Attendance: 7,896; Referee: Tony Chapron

=== Coupe de France ===
5 January 2014 Round of 64	Raon-l'Étape	1–2	Bordeaux	Raon-l'Étape
14:15 CET (UTC+01:00)	Ketlas (yellow card) 29'; Patin 71'	Report	Saivet 15' (pen.); Traoré (yellow card) 60'; Faubert (yellow card) 84'; Bellion 87'	Stadium: Stade Paul-Gasser; Attendance: 2,600; Referee: Alexandre Castro

22 January 2014 Round of 32	Île-Rousse	0–0 (a.e.t.) (4-3 p)	Bordeaux	Corsica
17:00 CET (UTC+01:00)	Ventura (yellow card) 6'; Sauli (yellow card) 57'; Delfino (yellow card) 91'; Menozzi (yellow card) 115+2'	Report	Orbán (yellow card) 9'; Crivelli (yellow card) 75'	Stadium: Stade Jacques Ambroggi
	Penalties
	Delfino (penalty scored); Vachet (penalty scored); Portillo (penalty scored); Santelli (penalty scored); Menozzi (penalty missed)		(penalty scored) Sertic; (penalty scored) Henrique; (penalty scored) Mariano; (penalty missed) Bellion; (penalty missed) Sané

=== Coupe de la Ligue ===
18 December 2013 Round of 16	Rennes	1–2	Bordeaux	Rennes
20:55 CEST (UTC+02:00)	Doucouré 52'; Romero (yellow card) 80'; N'Diaye (yellow card) 90+1'	Report	Henrique 50', (yellow card) 61'; Jussiê 90+1'	Stadium: Stade de la Route de Lorient; Attendance: 18,714; Referee: Tony Chapron

14 January 2014 Quarter-finals	Bordeaux	1–3	Paris Saint-Germain	Bordeaux
21:00 CET	Biyogo Poko 48', (yellow card) 80'; Traoré (yellow card) 59'	Report	Pastore 45'; Verratti (yellow card) 64'; Rabiot 85'; Matuidi 88'	Stadium: Stade Chaban-Delmas; Attendance: 29,250; Referee: Ruddy Buquet

=== UEFA Europa League ===
==== Group stage ====
Pos	Team	Pld	W	D	L	GF	GA	GD	Pts	Qualification
1	(Germany) Eintracht Frankfurt	6	5	0	1	13	4	+9	15	Advance to knockout phase
2	(Israel) Maccabi Tel Aviv	6	3	2	1	7	5	+2	11	Advance to knockout phase
3	(Cyprus) APOEL	6	1	2	3	3	8	−5	5	
4	(France) Bordeaux	6	1	0	5	4	10	−6	3	

Source: Soccerway

19 September 2013 1	Eintracht Frankfurt (Germany)	3–0	(France) Bordeaux	Frankfurt, Germany
19:00	Kadlec 4'; Russ 16', (yellow card) 58'; Djakpa 52'; Celozzi (yellow card) 84'	Report	Orbán (red card) 61'; Rolán (yellow card) 82'; Traoré (yellow card) 90+1'	Stadium: Commerzbank-Arena; Attendance: 44,000; Referee: Andre Marriner (England)

3 October 2013 2	Bordeaux (France)	1–2	(Israel) Maccabi Tel Aviv	Bordeaux, France
21:05	Jussiê 48'; Bréchet (yellow card) 52'; Maurice-Belay (yellow card) 62'; Obraniak (yellow card) 90+3'; Sané (yellow card) 90+3'	Report	García (yellow card) 63'; Yitzhaki 71'; Micha 80'	Stadium: Stade Chaban-Delmas; Attendance: 7,329; Referee: Michael Koukoulakis (Greece)

24 October 2013 3	Bordeaux (France)	2–1	(Cyprus) APOEL	Bordeaux, France
21:05	Sané 24', (yellow card) 73'; Henrique 90'	Report	Gonçalves 45'	Stadium: Stade Chaban-Delmas; Attendance: 10,404; Referee: Martin Strömbergsson (Sweden)

7 November 2013 4	APOEL (Cyprus)	2–1	(France) Bordeaux	Nicosia, Cyprus
19:00	Alexandrou 14'; Charalambides (yellow card) 23'; Budimir (red card) 50'; Morais 55'; Vinícius (yellow card) 86'; Pardo (yellow card) 90+2'; Oliveira (yellow card) 90+3'	Report	N'Guémo (yellow card) 37' (yellow-red card) 50'; Sané 45+2'	Stadium: GSP Stadium; Attendance: 11,853; Referee: Sébastien Delferiere (Belgium)

28 November 2013 5	Bordeaux (France)	0–1	(Germany) Eintracht Frankfurt	Bordeaux, France
21:05	Poundjé (yellow card) 47'; Faubert (yellow card) 73'	Report	Rode (yellow card) 42'; Oczipka (yellow card) 55'; Schwegler (yellow card) 66'; Lanig 83'; Barnetta (yellow card) 84'	Stadium: Stade Chaban-Delmas; Attendance: 19,013; Referee: Alberto Undiano Mallenco (Spain)

12 December 2013 6	Maccabi Tel Aviv (Israel)	1–0	(France) Bordeaux	Tel Aviv, Israel
19:00	Itzhaki (yellow card) 52'; Tibi (yellow card) 65'; Zahavi 74' (pen.)	Report	Chalmé (yellow card) 8' (yellow-red card) 73'; Ben Khalfallah (yellow card) 79'	Stadium: Bloomfield Stadium; Attendance: 11,732; Referee: Serhiy Boyko (Ukraine)
