= 2013 Trophée des Champions =

- Event: Trophée des Champions
Paris Saint-Germain	Bordeaux
Ligue 1	Coupe de France
2	1
- Date: 3 August 2013
- Venue: Stade d'Angondjé, Libreville, Gabon
- Referee: Jérôme Efong Nzolo (Belgium)
- Attendance: 34,658

The 2013 Trophée des Champions (English: 2013 Champions' Trophy) was the 18th edition of the French super cup. The match was contested by Paris Saint-Germain, the 2012–13 Ligue 1 champions and Bordeaux, the winners of the 2012–13 edition of the Coupe de France. The match was played at the Stade d'Angondjé in Libreville, Gabon, the fifth consecutive time the competition had taken place on foreign soil. Paris Saint-Germain won the trophy after a 95th-minute headed winner from Alex. It was PSG's third win out of seven appearances in the fixture.

== Match ==
=== Details ===
3 August 2013
19:45 (WAT)

Paris Saint-Germain	2–1	Bordeaux
Ongenda 81'; Alex 90+3'	Report	Saivet 38'

Stade d'Angondjé, Libreville
Attendance: 34,658
Referee: Jérôme Efong Nzolo (Belgium)

Paris Saint-Germain	Bordeaux

GK	30	(Italy) Salvatore Sirigu
RB	26	(France) Christophe Jallet
CB	13	(Brazil) Alex
CB	2	(Brazil) Thiago Silva (c)
LB	17	(Brazil) Maxwell
MF	14	(France) Blaise Matuidi	(yellow card) 78'
MF	8	(Italy) Thiago Motta	(yellow card) 46'	(substituted off) 72'
AM	27	(Argentina) Javier Pastore		(substituted off) 73'
AM	29	(Brazil) Lucas
FW	10	(Sweden) Zlatan Ibrahimović
FW	22	(Argentina) Ezequiel Lavezzi		(substituted off) 74'
Substitutes:
GK	1	(France) Nicolas Douchez
DF	3	(France) Mamadou Sakho
DF	21	(France) Lucas Digne
DF	23	(Netherlands) Gregory van der Wiel
MF	24	(Italy) Marco Verratti		(substituted on) 72'
MF	38	(France) Kingsley Coman		(substituted on) 74'
FW	35	(France) Hervin Ongenda		(substituted on) 73'
Manager:
(France) Laurent Blanc

GK	16	(France) Cédric Carrasso
RB	25	(Brazil) Mariano
CB	6	(Senegal) Ludovic Sané
CB	26	(Croatia) Grégory Sertic
LB	29	(France) Maxime Poundjé
CM	18	(Czech Republic) Jaroslav Plašil (c)		(substituted off) 90+2'
CM	7	(Cameroon) Landry N'Guémo	(yellow card) 45+2'
AM	17	(Gabon) André Biyogo Poko
AM	4	(Poland) Ludovic Obraniak
FW	10	(France) Henri Saivet		(substituted off) 90+1'
FW	19	(France) Nicolas Maurice-Belay		(substituted off) 90+3'
Substitutes:
GK	1	(Slovenia) Ažbe Jug
GK	30	(Martinique) Kévin Olimpa
DF	2	(Serbia) Vujadin Savić
DF	21	(France) Matthieu Chalmé
MF	8	(Tunisia) Fahid Ben Khalfallah		(substituted on) 90+1'
FW	12	(France) Hadi Sacko		(substituted on) 90+3'
FW	20	(Brazil) Jussiê		(substituted on) 90+2'
Manager:
(France) Francis Gillot

MATCH OFFICIALS

- Assistant referees:
  - Evarist Menkouande (Cameroon)
  - Sylvain Mouala (Gabon)
- Fourth official: Eric Otogo-Castane (Gabon)

MATCH RULES

- 90 minutes.
- Penalty shoot-out if scores level after 90 minutes.
- Seven named substitutes
- Maximum of six substitutions.

== See also ==
- 2013–14 Ligue 1
- 2013–14 Coupe de France
- 2013–14 FC Girondins de Bordeaux season
- 2013–14 Paris Saint-Germain FC season
