= 2009–10 FC Girondins de Bordeaux season =

Bordeaux
2009–10 season
- President: Jean-Louis Triaud
- Head coach: Laurent Blanc
- Stadium: Stade Chaban-Delmas
- Ligue 1: 6th
- Coupe de France: Round of 16
- Coupe de la Ligue: Runners-up
- Trophée des Champions: Winners
- UEFA Champions League: Quarter-finals
- Top goalscorer: League: Wendel (11); All: Marouane Chamakh (16)
Home colours	Away colours	Third colours

The 2009–10 season was the 120th season in the existence of FC Girondins de Bordeaux and the club's 19th consecutive season in the top flight of French football. In addition to the domestic league, Bordeaux participated in this season's editions of the Coupe de France, the Coupe de la Ligue, the Trophée des Champions, and the UEFA Champions League.

== Season summary ==
Bordeaux made a good run in the Champions League, reaching the quarter-finals before being knocked out by Lyon. Bordeaux's poor league form saw them drop down to 6th, ensuring that there would be no repeat of European adventure next season.

Manager Laurent Blanc resigned at the end of the season, on 16 May, after 3 years in charge. This was controversial, as Blanc immediately made an inquiry about the position as manager of the national team, prompting chairman Jean-Louis Triaud to demand compensation from the French Football Federation.

== Squad ==
Squad at end of season

Note: Flags indicate national team as defined under FIFA eligibility rules; some limited exceptions apply. Players may hold more than one non-FIFA nationality.

No.	Pos.	Nation	Player
1	GK	FRA	Cédric Carrasso
2	DF	FRA	Michaël Ciani
3	DF	BRA	Henrique
4	MF	FRA	Alou Diarra
5	MF	BRA	Fernando Menegazzo
6	DF	FRA	Franck Jurietti
7	FW	FRA	Yoan Gouffran
8	MF	FRA	Yoann Gourcuff
9	FW	ARG	Fernando Cavenaghi
10	FW	BRA	Jussiê
11	FW	FRA	David Bellion
13	DF	ARG	Diego Placente
16	GK	FRA	Ulrich Ramé
17	MF	BRA	Wendel

No.	Pos.	Nation	Player
18	MF	CZE	Jaroslav Plašil
20	MF	SEN	Henri Saivet
21	DF	FRA	Matthieu Chalmé
22	MF	FRA	Grégory Sertic
24	MF	MLI	Abdou Traoré
25	MF	SEN	Ludovic Sané (Note: Sané was born in Villeneuve-sur-Lot, France, but also qualifies to represent Senegal internationally.)
27	DF	FRA	Marc Planus
28	DF	FRA	Benoît Trémoulinas
29	FW	MAR	Marouane Chamakh (Note: Chamarkh was born in Tonneins, France, but also qualifies to represent Morocco internationally.)
30	GK	FRA	Abdoulaye Keita
31	MF	FRA	Johan Blonbou
32	MF	FRA	Guillaume Insou
33	GK	FRA	Fabien Farnolle (Note: Farnolle was born in Bordeaux, France, but also qualified to represent Benin internationally.)
34	DF	FRA	Christopher Glombard

=== Left club during season ===
Note: Flags indicate national team as defined under FIFA eligibility rules; some limited exceptions apply. Players may hold more than one non-FIFA nationality.

No.	Pos.	Nation	Player
12	MF	FRA	Paul Lasne (on loan to La Berrichonne)
19	MF	FRA	Pierre Ducasse (on loan to Lorient)

No.	Pos.	Nation	Player
26	DF	FRA	Matthieu Saunier (on loan to Rodez)

== Competitions ==
=== Overview ===
Competition	First match	Last match	Starting round	Final position	Record							
Competition	First match	Last match	Starting round	Final position	Pld	W	D	L	GF	GA	GD	Win %
Ligue 1	9 August 2009	15 May 2010	Matchday 1	6th	28	19	7	2	58	40	+18	67.86
Coupe de France	9 January 2010	10 February 2010	Round of 64	Round of 64	3	2	0	1	6	3	+3	66.67
Coupe de la Ligue	26 January 2010	27 March 2010	Round of 16	Runners-up	4	3	0	1	9	6	+3	75.00
Trophée des Champions	25 July 2009		Final	Winners	1	1	0	0	2	0	+2	100.00
Champions League	15 September 2009	7 April 2010	Group stage	Quarter-finals	10	8	1	1	14	6	+8	80.00
Total					46	33	8	5	89	55	+34	71.74

Source: Soccerway

=== Trophée des Champions ===
25 July 2009 Final	Bordeaux	2–0	Guingamp	Montreal, Canada
21:00	Cavenaghi 39'; Fernando 90'	Report		Stadium: Olympic Stadium; Attendance: 34,068; Referee: (Canada) Steve DePiero

=== Ligue 1 ===
==== League table ====
Pos	Team	Pld	W	D	L	GF	GA	GD	Pts	Qualification or relegation
4	Lille	38	21	7	10	72	40	+32	70	Qualification to Europa League play-off round (Note: Coupe de France winners Paris Saint-Germain qualify for the 2010–11 UEFA Europa League Play-off round of 2010–11 UEFA Europa League.)
5	Montpellier	38	20	9	9	50	40	+10	69	Qualification to Europa League third qualifying round (Note: Coupe de la Ligue winners Marseille finished as champions, fulfilling a finish of at least 4th place, thus their Europa League Third qualifying round berth will go to the 5th placed team in the league.)
6	Bordeaux	38	19	7	12	58	40	+18	64	
7	Lorient	38	16	10	12	54	42	+12	58	
8	Monaco	38	15	10	13	39	45	−6	55	

Source: Ligue 1
Rules for classification: 1) points; 2) goal difference; 3) number of goals scored.

==== Results summary ====
Overall								Home						Away					
Pld	W	D	L	GF	GA	GD	Pts	W	D	L	GF	GA	GD	W	D	L	GF	GA	GD
38	19	7	12	58	40	+18	64	12	4	3	34	13	+21	7	3	9	24	27	−3

Source: Ligue 1

==== Results by round ====
Round	1	2	3	4	5	6	7	8	9	10	11	12	13	14	15	16	17	18	19	20	21	22	23	24	25	26	27	28	29	30	31	32	33	34	35	36	37	38
Ground	H	A	H	A	H	A	H	A	A	H	A	H	A	H	A	H	A	H	A	H	A	H	A	H	H	A	H	A	H	A	H	A	H	A	H	A	H	A
Result	W	W	W	D	W	W	W	L	L	W	W	W	L	L	W	W	W	W	W	D	W	D	L	W	L	L	D	D	W	L	L	L	D	L	W	D	W	L
Position	1	2	1	1	1	1	1	2	3	1	1	1	1	2	1	1	1	1	1	1	1	1	1	1	1	2	2	2	2	2	5	5	6	6	5	6	6	6

Source: Ligue 1
A = Away; H = Home; W = Win; D = Draw; L = Loss

==== Matches ====
9 August 2009 1	Bordeaux	4–1	Lens	Bordeaux
21:00 CEST (UTC+2)		Report		Stadium: Stade Chaban-Delmas

15 August 2009 2	Sochaux	2–3	Bordeaux	Montbéliard
19:00 CEST (UTC+2)		Report		Stadium: Stade Auguste Bonal

23 August 2009 3	Bordeaux	4–0	Nice	Bordeaux
17:00 CEST (UTC+2)		Report		Stadium: Stade Chaban-Delmas

30 August 2009 4	Marseille	0–0	Bordeaux	Marseille
21:00 CEST (UTC+2)		Report		Stadium: Stade Vélodrome

12 September 2009 5	Bordeaux	1–0	Grenoble	Bordeaux
21:00 CEST (UTC+2)		Report		Stadium: Stade Chaban-Delmas

19 September 2009 6	Boulogne	0–2	Bordeaux	Boulogne-sur-Mer
19:00 CEST (UTC+2)		Report		Stadium: Stade de la Libération

27 September 2009 7	Bordeaux	1–0	Rennes	Bordeaux
21:00 CEST (UTC+2)		Report		Stadium: Stade Chaban-Delmas

3 October 2009 8	Saint-Étienne	3–1	Bordeaux	Saint-Étienne
19:00 CEST (UTC+2)		Report		Stadium: Stade Geoffroy-Guichard

17 October 2009 9	Auxerre	1–0	Bordeaux	Auxerre
19:00 CEST (UTC+2)		Report		Stadium: Stade de l'Abbé-Deschamps

24 October 2009 10	Bordeaux	3–0	Le Mans	Bordeaux
19:00 CEST (UTC+2)		Report		Stadium: Stade Chaban-Delmas

31 October 2009 12	Bordeaux	1–0	Monaco	Bordeaux
19:00 CET (UTC+1)		Report		Stadium: Stade Chaban-Delmas

8 November 2009 13	Lille	2–0	Bordeaux	Villeneuve d'Ascq
17:00 CET (UTC+1)		Report		Stadium: Stadium Lille Métropole

21 November 2009 14	Bordeaux	0–1	Valenciennes	Bordeaux
19:00 CET (UTC+1)		Report		Stadium: Stade Chaban-Delmas

29 November 2009 15	Nancy	0–3	Bordeaux	Tomblaine
17:00 CET (UTC+1)		Report		Stadium: Stade Marcel Picot

5 December 2009 16	Bordeaux	1–0	Paris Saint-Germain	Bordeaux
21:00 CET (UTC+1)		Report		Stadium: Stade Chaban-Delmas

13 December 2009 17	Lyon	0–1	Bordeaux	Lyon
21:00 CET (UTC+1)		Report		Stadium: Stade Gerland

16 December 2009 11	Montpellier	0–1	Bordeaux	Montpellier
19:00 CET (UTC+1)		Report		Stadium: Stade de la Mosson

19 December 2009 18	Bordeaux	4–1	Lorient	Bordeaux
19:00 CET (UTC+1)		Report		Stadium: Stade Chaban-Delmas

23 December 2009 19	Toulouse	1–2	Bordeaux	Toulouse
21:00 CET (UTC+1)		Report		Stadium: Stadium de Toulouse

17 January 2010 20	Bordeaux	1–1	Marseille	Bordeaux
21:00 CET (UTC+1)		Report		Stadium: Stade Chaban-Delmas

20 January 2010 21	Grenoble	1–3	Bordeaux	Grenoble
19:00 CET (UTC+1)		Report		Stadium: Stade des Alpes

30 January 2010 22	Bordeaux	0–0	Boulogne	Bordeaux
19:00 CET (UTC+1)		Report		Stadium: Stade Chaban-Delmas

6 February 2010 23	Rennes	4–2	Bordeaux	Rennes
21:00 CET (UTC+1)		Report		Stadium: Stade de la Route de Lorient

14 February 2010 24	Bordeaux	3–1	Saint-Étienne	Bordeaux
21:00 CET (UTC+1)		Report		Stadium: Stade Chaban-Delmas

7 March 2010 27	Bordeaux	1–1	Montpellier	Bordeaux
21:00 CET (UTC+1)		Report		Stadium: Stade Chaban-Delmas

10 March 2010 25	Bordeaux	1–2	Auxerre	Bordeaux
19:00 CET (UTC+1)		Report		Stadium: Stade Chaban-Delmas

13 March 2010 28	Monaco	0–0	Bordeaux	Monaco
19:00 CET (UTC+1)		Report		Stadium: Stade Louis II

21 March 2010 29	Bordeaux	3–1	Lille	Bordeaux
17:00 CET (UTC+1)		Report		Stadium: Stade Chaban-Delmas

3 April 2010 31	Bordeaux	1–2	Nancy	Bordeaux
19:00 CEST (UTC+2)		Report		Stadium: Stade Chaban-Delmas

10 April 2010 32	Paris Saint-Germain	3–1	Bordeaux	Paris
21:00 CEST (UTC+2)		Report		Stadium: Parc des Princes

14 April 2010 26	Le Mans	2–1	Bordeaux	Le Mans
20:00 CEST (UTC+2)		Report		Stadium: Stade Léon-Bollée

17 April 2010 33	Bordeaux	2–2	Lyon	Bordeaux
21:00 CEST (UTC+2)		Report		Stadium: Stade Chaban-Delmas

24 April 2010 34	Lorient	1–0	Bordeaux	Lorient
19:00 CEST (UTC+2)		Report		Stadium: Stade du Moustoir

28 April 2010 30	Valenciennes	2–0	Bordeaux	Valenciennes
19:00 CEST (UTC+2)		Report		Stadium: Stade Nungesser

2 May 2010 35	Bordeaux	1–0	Toulouse	Bordeaux
17:00 CEST (UTC+2)		Report		Stadium: Stade Chaban-Delmas

5 May 2010 36	Nice	1–1	Bordeaux	Nice
19:00 CEST (UTC+2)		Report		Stadium: Stade du Ray

8 May 2010 37	Bordeaux	2–0	Sochaux	Bordeaux
21:00 CEST (UTC+2)		Report		Stadium: Stade Chaban-Delmas

15 May 2010 38	Lens	4–3	Bordeaux	Lens
21:00 CEST (UTC+2)		Report		Stadium: Stade Félix-Bollaert

=== Coupe de France ===
9 January 2010 Round of 64	Bordeaux	1–0	Rodez	Bordeaux
20:45 CET (UTC+1)				Stadium: Stade Chaban-Delmas

23 January 2010 Round of 32	Bordeaux	5–1	Ajaccio	Bordeaux
17:45 CET (UTC+1)				Stadium: Stade Chaban-Delmas

10 February 2010 Round of 16	Bordeaux	0–2	Monaco	Bordeaux
20:45 CET (UTC+1)				Stadium: Stade Chaban-Delmas

=== Coupe de la Ligue ===
26 January 2010 Round of 16	Le Mans	2–3	Bordeaux	Le Mans
20:45 CET (UTC+1)	Le Tallec 5'; João Paulo 38'		Gouffran 13'; Gourcuff 36'; Plašil 51'	Stadium: Stade Léon-Bollée; Referee: Bruno Coue

2 February 2010 Quarter-finals	Bordeaux	1–0	Sedan	Bordeaux
18:45 CET (UTC+1)	Gouffran 49'			Stadium: Stade Chaban-Delmas; Attendance: 9,819; Referee: Stéphane Bre

17 February 2010 Semi-finals	Lorient	1–4	Bordeaux	Lorient
20:45 CET (UTC+1)	Koscielny 12'		Wendel 24' (pen.), 80'; Chamakh 29'; Gouffran 89'	Stadium: Stade du Moustoir; Attendance: 14,168; Referee: Clément Turpin

27 March 2010 Final	Marseille	3–1	Bordeaux	Saint-Denis
20:50 CET (UTC+1)	Diawara 61'; Valbuena 67'; Chalmé 77' (o.g.)		Sané 83'	Stadium: Stade de France; Attendance: 79,000; Referee: Stéphane Lannoy

=== UEFA Champions League ===
==== Group stage ====
Pos	Team	Pld	W	D	L	GF	GA	GD	Pts	Qualification
1	(France) Bordeaux	6	5	1	0	9	2	+7	16	Advance to knockout phase
2	(Germany) Bayern Munich	6	3	1	2	9	5	+4	10	Advance to knockout phase
3	(Italy) Juventus	6	2	2	2	4	7	−3	8	Transfer to Europa League
4	(Israel) Maccabi Haifa	6	0	0	6	0	8	−8	0	

Source: RSSSF

15 September 2009 1	Juventus (Italy)	1–1	(France) Bordeaux	Turin, Italy
20:45 CEST (UTC+2)	Iaquinta 63'	Report	Plašil 75'	Stadium: Stadio Olimpico (Note: Juventus played their home group matches at the Stadio Olimpico di Torino as their Stadio delle Alpi was demolished to make way for Juventus Arena.); Attendance: 17,513; Referee: Tom Henning Øvrebø (Norway)

30 September 2009 2	Bordeaux (France)	1–0	(Israel) Maccabi Haifa	Bordeaux, France
20:45 CEST (UTC+2)	Ciani 83'	Report		Stadium: Stade Chaban-Delmas; Attendance: 28,748; Referee: Eric Braamhaar (Netherlands)

21 October 2009 3	Bordeaux (France)	2–1	(Germany) Bayern Munich	Bordeaux, France
20:45 CEST (UTC+2)	Ciani 27'; Planus 40'	Report	Ciani 6' (o.g.)	Stadium: Stade Chaban-Delmas; Attendance: 31,321; Referee: Terje Hauge (Norway)

3 November 2009 4	Bayern Munich (Germany)	0–2	(France) Bordeaux	Munich, Germany
20:45 CET (UTC+1)		Report	Gourcuff 37'; Chamakh 90'	Stadium: Allianz Arena; Attendance: 66,000; Referee: Pedro Proença (Portugal)

25 November 2009 5	Bordeaux (France)	2–0	(Italy) Juventus	Bordeaux, France
20:45 CET (UTC+1)	Fernando 54'; Chamakh 90+4'	Report		Stadium: Stade Chaban-Delmas; Attendance: 32,195; Referee: Eduardo Iturralde González (Spain)

8 December 2009 6	Maccabi Haifa (Israel)	0–1	(France) Bordeaux	Ramat Gan, Israel
20:45 CET (UTC+1)		Report	Jussiê 13'	Stadium: Ramat Gan Stadium (Note: Maccabi Haifa played their home group matches at the Ramat Gan Stadium in Tel Aviv District as their Kiryat Eliezer Stadium did not meet UEFA criteria.); Attendance: 25,800; Referee: Jonas Eriksson (Sweden)

==== Knockout phase ====
===== Round of 16 =====
23 February 2010 First leg	Olympiacos (Greece)	0–1	(France) Bordeaux	Piraeus, Greece
20:45 CET (UTC+1)		Report	Ciani 45+2'	Stadium: Karaiskakis Stadium; Attendance: 29,773; Referee: Howard Webb (England)

17 March 2010 Second leg	Bordeaux (France)	2–1 (3–1 agg.)	(Greece) Olympiacos	Bordeaux, France
20:45 CET (UTC+1)	Gourcuff 5'; Chamakh 88'	Report	Mitroglou 65'	Stadium: Stade Chaban-Delmas; Attendance: 31,004; Referee: Olegário Benquerença (Portugal)

===== Quarter-finals =====
30 March 2010 First leg	Lyon (France)	3–1	(France) Bordeaux	Lyon, France
20:45 CEST (UTC+2)	Lisandro 10', 77' (pen.); Bastos 32'	Report	Chamakh 14'	Stadium: Stade de Gerland; Attendance: 37,859; Referee: Felix Brych (Germany)

7 April 2010 Second leg	Bordeaux (France)	1–0 (2–3 agg.)	(France) Lyon	Bordeaux, France
20:45 CEST (UTC+2)	Chamakh 45'	Report		Stadium: Stade Chaban-Delmas; Attendance: 31,962; Referee: Alberto Undiano Mallenco (Spain)
