= 2013–14 Paris Saint-Germain FC season =

44th season in existence of Paris Saint-Germain

Paris Saint-Germain
2013–14 season
- President: Nasser Al-Khelaifi
- Head coach: Laurent Blanc
- Stadium: Parc des Princes
- Ligue 1: 1st
- Coupe de France: Round of 32
- Coupe de la Ligue: Winners
- Trophée des Champions: Winners
- UEFA Champions League: Quarter-finals
- Top goalscorer: League: Zlatan Ibrahimović (26); All: Zlatan Ibrahimović (41)
- Average home league attendance: 45,420
Home colours	Away colours	Third colours

The 2013–14 season was Paris Saint-Germain Football Club's 44th in existence and their 41st in the top-flight of French football. The team competed in Ligue 1, the Coupe de France, the Coupe de la Ligue, the Trophée des Champions and the UEFA Champions League.

== Summary ==
After Ezequiel Lavezzi, Thiago Silva, Marco Verratti, Zlatan Ibrahimović and Gregory van der Wiel, who all arrived in the summer of 2012, Paris Saint-Germain made another big impact in the summer transfer window 12 months later. Lucas Digne, Marquinhos and Edinson Cavani all joined the squad now coached by Laurent Blanc, who replaced Carlo Ancelotti. The defending Ligue 1 champions hit the ground running with a 2-1 victory over Girondins de Bordeaux to snare the first silverware of the new season, the 2013 Trophée des Champions in Libreville, Gabon.

In Ligue 1, the season opened with a 1-1 draw away to Montpellier, followed by a 1-1 draw at home to AC Ajaccio, which saw Edinson Cavani open his account with Les Rouge-et-Bleu. In Week 3, Laurent Blanc's men recorded their first win of the new season, against Nantes, 2-1. After this slow start to Ligue 1, Blanc's change to a three-man midfield composed by Blaise Matuidi, Thiago Motta and Verratti in a 4-3-3 system during a 2-0 away win over Bordeaux in early September was the pivotal moment. It took just four more games before PSG permanently overhauled early pacesetters Monaco at the top of the table. After another 2-0 wins over Guingamp, the capital club were back in UEFA Champions League action. The objective was to at least do as well as the previous season where the side was eliminated in the quarter-finals on the away goals rule against Barcelona (2-2 and 1-1). And Paris started in style away to Olympiacos with a 4-1 win.

After being held 1-1 by Monaco, and two wins over Valenciennes (1-0) and Toulouse (2-0), Paris enjoyed a week rich in emotions. First up was Benfica at home, before a trip to Olympique de Marseille's Stade Vélodrome. Les Rouge-et-Bleu made light work of their home clash, defeating the Portuguese side 3-0, for a second straight Champions League game. And then came one of the turning points of the season. Reduced to ten men and trailing on the scoreboard, Paris came from behind to defeat OM 2-1, before racking up the victories in October and November, defeating Bastia (4-0), Anderlecht (5-0), Lorient (4-0), Nice (3-1) and Stade de Reims (3-0). Only Saint-Étienne (2-2) and Anderlecht (1-1) took points. The series continued with Olympiacos (2-1), which confirmed qualification for the last-16 of the Champions League, and Olympique Lyonnais (4-0) where Paris really impressed.

The two first defeats of the season, against Evian (0-2) and Benfica (1-2) changed little. Laurent Blanc's men continued to dominate with big wins over Sochaux-Montbéliard (5-0) and Stade Rennais (3-1), before qualifying for the quarter-finals of the Coupe de la Ligue after extra time against Saint-Étienne. A 2-2 with Lille in the final game of the calendar year saw Paris sitting atop the standings. Stade Brest (5-2, Coupe de France last 64), Ajaccio (2-1), Bordeaux (3-1, Coupe de la Ligue quarter-finals) and Nantes (5-0) all fell against the champions. The Coupe de France defeat at home to Montpellier (1-2) in the last 32 was the season's low note. However, Les Parisiens followed up with victories over Bordeaux (2-0) and Nantes (2-1).

Monaco held the club to another draw (1-1), but it only sparked the side into a streak of 11 wins in a row. In the 2014 Coupe de France Final, against Lyon, Paris won 2-1 and collected their second title of the season after the Trophée des Champions. Paris then defeated Evian TG 1-0, before drawing with Sochaux 1-1 and were crowned French champions before entering the field to play against Rennes (1-2), after Monaco failed to win. It was a second consecutive league title, the fourth in the club's history, and the third trophy of the season.

== Players ==
Players, transfers, appearances and goals - 2013/2014 season.

=== First-team squad ===
Note: Flags indicate national team as defined under FIFA eligibility rules; some limited exceptions apply. Players may hold more than one non-FIFA nationality.

No.	Pos.	Nation	Player
1	GK	FRA	Nicolas Douchez
2	DF	BRA	Thiago Silva (captain)
4	MF	FRA	Yohan Cabaye
5	DF	BRA	Marquinhos
6	DF	FRA	Zoumana Camara
7	MF	FRA	Jérémy Ménez
8	MF	ITA	Thiago Motta
9	FW	URU	Edinson Cavani
10	FW	SWE	Zlatan Ibrahimović
13	DF	BRA	Alex
14	MF	FRA	Blaise Matuidi
16	GK	FRA	Mike Maignan
17	DF	BRA	Maxwell

No.	Pos.	Nation	Player
21	DF	FRA	Lucas Digne
22	FW	ARG	Ezequiel Lavezzi
23	DF	NED	Gregory van der Wiel
24	MF	ITA	Marco Verratti
25	MF	FRA	Adrien Rabiot
26	DF	FRA	Christophe Jallet
27	MF	ARG	Javier Pastore
29	MF	BRA	Lucas Moura
30	GK	ITA	Salvatore Sirigu
35	FW	FRA	Hervin Ongenda
38	MF	FRA	Kingsley Coman
40	GK	FRA	Mory Diaw

=== Out on loan ===
Note: Flags indicate national team as defined under FIFA eligibility rules; some limited exceptions apply. Players may hold more than one non-FIFA nationality.

No.	Pos.	Nation	Player
—	DF	FRA	Antoine Conte (at Reims)
—	DF	FRA	Jordan Ikoko (at Créteil)
—	DF	FRA	Youssouf Sabaly (at Evian)

No.	Pos.	Nation	Player
—	GK	FRA	Alphonse Areola (at Lens)
—	MF	FRA	Clément Chantôme (at Toulouse)
—	FW	FRA	Jean-Christophe Bahebeck (at Valenciennes)

=== Transfers in ===
Note: Flags indicate national team as defined under FIFA eligibility rules; some limited exceptions apply. Players may hold more than one non-FIFA nationality.

No.	Pos.	Nation	Player
—	FW	URU	Edinson Cavani (from Napoli) (€64 million)
—	DF	FRA	Lucas Digne (from Lille) (€15 million)

No.	Pos.	Nation	Player
—	DF	BRA	Marquinhos (from Roma) (€31.4 million)
—	MF	FRA	Yohan Cabaye (from Newcastle United) (£19 million)

=== Transfers out ===
Note: Flags indicate national team as defined under FIFA eligibility rules; some limited exceptions apply. Players may hold more than one non-FIFA nationality.

No.	Pos.	Nation	Player
—	MF	ENG	David Beckham (Retired)
—	GK	FRA	Ronan Le Crom (Retired)
—	DF	CIV	Siaka Tiéné (to Montpellier)
—	DF	FRA	Sylvain Armand (to Rennes)

No.	Pos.	Nation	Player
—	MF	FRA	Loïck Landre (to Lens)
—	FW	FRA	Kevin Gameiro (to Sevilla)
—	DF	URU	Diego Lugano (to West Brom)
—	DF	FRA	Mamadou Sakho (to Liverpool)

== Statistics ==
=== Appearances and goals ===
No.	Pos	Nat	Player	Total		Ligue 1		Coupe de France		Coupe de la Ligue		Trophée des Champions		Champions League	
No.	Pos	Nat	Player	Apps	Goals	Apps	Goals	Apps	Goals	Apps	Goals	Apps	Goals	Apps	Goals
Goalkeepers
1	GK	(France) FRA	Nicolas Douchez	6	0	1	0	2	0	3	0	0	0	0	0
16	GK	(France) FRA	Mike Maignan	0	0	0	0	0	0	0	0	0	0	0	0
30	GK	(Italy) ITA	Salvatore Sirigu	49	0	37	0	0	0	1	0	1	0	10	0
40	GK	(France) FRA	Mory Diaw	0	0	0	0	0	0	0	0	0	0	0	0
Defenders
2	DF	(Brazil) BRA	Thiago Silva	42	3	28	3	2	0	4	0	1	0	6+1	0
5	DF	(Brazil) BRA	Marquinhos	32	5	17+4	2	1	0	2	0	0	0	6+2	3
6	DF	(France) FRA	Zoumana Camara	11	0	2+4	0	0	0	1	0	0	0	1+3	0
13	DF	(Brazil) BRA	Alex	42	3	30+1	2	1	0	2	0	1	1	7	0
17	DF	(Brazil) BRA	Maxwell	36	3	23+1	3	1	0	2	0	1	0	8	0
21	DF	(France) FRA	Lucas Digne	20	0	15	0	1	0	2	0	0	0	2	0
23	DF	(Netherlands) NED	Gregory van der Wiel	35	0	24+1	0	2	0	2	0	0	0	6	0
26	DF	(France) FRA	Christophe Jallet	18	0	13	0	0	0	1	0	1	0	3	0
37	DF	(Mali) MLI	Kalifa Traoré	1	0	0	0	0	0	0	0	0	0	1	0
Midfielders
4	MF	(France) FRA	Yohan Cabaye	21	1	9+6	0	0	0	0+2	0	0	0	1+3	1
7	MF	(France) FRA	Jérémy Ménez	26	2	7+9	2	1+1	0	1+3	0	0	0	1+3	0
8	MF	(Italy) ITA	Thiago Motta	47	6	31+1	3	1+1	1	3	0	1	0	9	2
14	MF	(France) FRA	Blaise Matuidi	52	6	27+9	5	2	0	2+2	1	1	0	8+1	0
24	MF	(Italy) ITA	Marco Verratti	43	1	23+6	0	1	0	4	0	0+1	0	8	1
25	MF	(France) FRA	Adrien Rabiot	34	3	12+13	2	1	0	2	1	0	0	2+4	0
27	MF	(Argentina) ARG	Javier Pastore	41	3	18+11	1	1+1	0	1+2	1	1	0	2+4	1
29	MF	(Brazil) BRA	Lucas Moura	53	5	18+18	5	1+1	0	4	0	1	0	5+5	0
38	MF	(France) FRA	Kingsley Coman	3	0	0+2	0	0	0	0	0	0+1	0	0	0
Forwards
9	FW	(Uruguay) URU	Edinson Cavani	43	25	25+5	16	2	1	2+1	4	0	0	8	4
10	FW	(Sweden) SWE	Zlatan Ibrahimović	46	41	32+1	26	1+1	3	2	2	1	0	8	10
22	FW	(Argentina) ARG	Ezequiel Lavezzi	49	12	24+8	9	1+1	1	3+1	0	1	0	8+2	2
35	FW	(France) FRA	Hervin Ongenda	8	1	2+4	0	0+1	0	0	0	0+1	1	0	0
Players transferred out during the season

Last updated: 17 May 2014
Source: Competitions

== Competitions ==
=== Trophée des Champions ===
3 August 2013 Final	Paris Saint-Germain	2–1	Bordeaux	Libreville, Gabon
	Ongenda 82'; Alex 90+5'	Report	Saivet 38'	Stadium: Stade d'Angondjé; Attendance: 34,658

=== Ligue 1 ===
==== League table ====
Pos	Team	Pld	W	D	L	GF	GA	GD	Pts	Qualification or relegation
1	Paris Saint-Germain (C)	38	27	8	3	84	23	+61	89	Qualification for the Champions League group stage (Note: Paris Saint-Germain qualified for the Europa League third qualifying round by winning the 2013–14 Coupe de la Ligue. However, since they already qualified for European competition based on their league position, the spots awarded to the cup winners were passed down the league.)
2	Monaco (Note: Monaco were deducted 2 points due to poor fan behavior in a match last season. However this was overturned on 13 August 2013.)	38	23	11	4	63	31	+32	80	Qualification for the Champions League group stage
3	Lille	38	20	11	7	46	26	+20	71	Qualification for the Champions League third qualifying round
4	Saint-Étienne	38	20	9	9	56	34	+22	69	Qualification for the Europa League play-off round
5	Lyon	38	17	10	11	56	44	+12	61	Qualification for the Europa League third qualifying round

Source: Ligue 1
Rules for classification: 1) Points; 2) Goal difference; 3) Number of goals scored
(C) Champions

==== Results summary ====
Overall								Home						Away					
Pld	W	D	L	GF	GA	GD	Pts	W	D	L	GF	GA	GD	W	D	L	GF	GA	GD
38	27	8	3	84	23	+61	89	15	3	1	51	7	+44	12	5	2	33	16	+17

Source: LFP.fr

==== Results by round ====
Round	1	2	3	4	5	6	7	8	9	10	11	12	13	14	15	16	17	18	19	20	21	22	23	24	25	26	27	28	29	30	31	32	33	34	35	36	37	38
Ground	A	H	A	H	A	H	A	H	A	H	A	H	H	A	H	A	H	A	H	A	H	A	H	A	H	A	H	A	H	A	A	H	A	H	A	H	A	H
Result	D	D	W	W	W	D	W	W	W	W	D	W	W	W	W	L	W	W	D	W	W	D	W	D	W	W	W	W	W	W	W	W	L	W	D	L	W	W
Position	11	12	9	5	3	2	2	2	2	1	1	1	1	1	1	1	1	1	1	1	1	1	1	1	1	1	1	1	1	1	1	1	1	1	1	1	1	1

Source: LFP.fr
A = Away; H = Home; W = Win; D = Draw; L = Loss

==== Matches ====
Win Draw Loss

9 August 2013 1	Montpellier	1–1	Paris Saint-Germain	Montpellier
	Cabella 10'	Report	Maxwell 60'	Stadium: Stade de la Mosson; Attendance: 27,717

18 August 2013 2	Paris Saint-Germain	1–1	Ajaccio	Paris
	Cavani 86'	Report	Pedretti 9'	Stadium: Parc des Princes; Attendance: 44,413

25 August 2013 3	Nantes	1–2	Paris Saint-Germain	Nantes
	Djilobodji 52'	Report	Cavani 24'; Lavezzi 73'	Stadium: Stade de la Beaujoire; Attendance: 35,867

31 August 2013 4	Paris Saint-Germain	2–0	Guingamp	Paris
	Rabiot 90+2'; Ibrahimović 90+3'	Report		Stadium: Parc des Princes; Attendance: 44,943

13 September 2013 5	Bordeaux	0–2	Paris Saint-Germain	Bordeaux
		Report	Matuidi 30'; Lucas 64'	Stadium: Stade Chaban-Delmas; Attendance: 29,548

22 September 2013 6	Paris Saint-Germain	1–1	Monaco	Paris
	Ibrahimović 5'	Report	Falcao 20'	Stadium: Parc des Princes; Attendance: 45,416

25 September 2013 7	Valenciennes	0–1	Paris Saint-Germain	Valenciennes
		Report	Cavani 45+2'	Stadium: Stade du Hainaut; Attendance: 19,180

28 September 2013 8	Paris Saint-Germain	2–0	Toulouse	Paris
	Marquinhos 41'; Cavani 79' (pen.)	Report		Stadium: Parc des Princes; Attendance: 44,745

6 October 2013 9	Marseille	1–2	Paris Saint-Germain	Marseille
	A. Ayew 34' (pen.)	Report	Maxwell 45'; Ibrahimović 66' (pen.)	Stadium: Stade Vélodrome; Attendance: 44,391

19 October 2013 10	Paris Saint-Germain	4–0	Bastia	Paris
	Ibrahimović 10', 13'; Cavani 63', 89' (pen.)	Report		Stadium: Parc des Princes; Attendance: 45,802

27 October 2013 11	Saint-Étienne	2–2	Paris Saint-Germain	Saint-Étienne
	Corgnet 18'; Hamouma 51'	Report	Cavani 68'; Matuidi 90+4'	Stadium: Stade Geoffroy-Guichard; Attendance: 32,807

1 November 2013 12	Paris Saint-Germain	4–0	Lorient	Paris
	Lucas 3'; Ménez 39'; Cavani 43', 81'	Report		Stadium: Parc des Princes; Attendance: 44,994

9 November 2013 13	Paris Saint-Germain	3–1	Nice	Paris
	Ibrahimović 39', 57' (pen.), 75'	Report	Pejčinović 70'	Stadium: Parc des Princes; Attendance: 45,599

23 November 2013 14	Reims	0–3	Paris Saint-Germain	Reims
		Report	Lucas 25'; Ménez 60'; Ibrahimović 90+1'	Stadium: Stade Auguste Delaune; Attendance: 20,666

1 December 2013 15	Paris Saint-Germain	4–0	Lyon	Paris
	Cavani 36'; Ibrahimović 41' (pen.), 83' (pen.); Thiago Silva 60'	Report		Stadium: Parc des Princes; Attendance: 44,829

4 December 2013 16	Evian	2–0	Paris Saint-Germain	Annecy
	N'Sikulu 75'; Sougou 87'	Report		Stadium: Parc des Sports; Attendance: 14,346

7 December 2013 17	Paris Saint-Germain	5–0	Sochaux	Paris
	Thiago Silva 14'; Lavezzi 47'; Cavani 62'; Ibrahimović 87', 90+2'	Report		Stadium: Parc des Princes; Attendance: 45,057

14 December 2013 18	Rennes	1–3	Paris Saint-Germain	Rennes
	Alessandrini 67'	Report	Motta 19'; Ibrahimović 52' (pen.); Cavani 90+1'	Stadium: Stade de la Route de Lorient; Attendance: 28,233

22 December 2013 19	Paris Saint-Germain	2–2	Lille	Paris
	Ibrahimović 36'; Baša 72' (o.g.)	Report	Mavuba 44'; Kalou 53' (pen.)	Stadium: Parc des Princes; Attendance: 45,844

11 January 2014 20	Ajaccio	1–2	Paris Saint-Germain	Ajaccio
	Eduardo 6'	Report	Lavezzi 41'; Matuidi 74'	Stadium: Stade François Coty; Attendance: 6,721

19 January 2014 21	Paris Saint-Germain	5–0	Nantes	Paris
	Thiago Silva 10'; Ibrahimović 36' (pen.), 64'; Motta 51'; Cavani 58'	Report		Stadium: Parc des Princes; Attendance: 45,956

25 January 2014 22	Guingamp	1–1	Paris Saint-Germain	Guingamp
	Yatabaré 84'	Report	Alex 87'	Stadium: Stade du Roudourou; Attendance: 17,623

31 January 2014 23	Paris Saint-Germain	2–0	Bordeaux	Paris
	Ibrahimović 58'; Alex 88'	Report		Stadium: Parc des Princes; Attendance: 45,292

9 February 2014 24	Monaco	1–1	Paris Saint-Germain	Monaco
	Thiago Silva 74' (o.g.)	Report	Pastore 8'	Stadium: Stade Louis II; Attendance: 16,384

14 February 2014 25	Paris Saint-Germain	3–0	Valenciennes	Paris
	Lavezzi 18'; Ibrahimović 50'; Kagelmacher 52' (o.g.)	Report		Stadium: Parc des Princes; Attendance: 45,727

23 February 2014 26	Toulouse	2–4	Paris Saint-Germain	Toulouse
	Ben Yedder 44', 72'	Report	Ibrahimović 32' (pen.), 68', 89'; Lavezzi 56'	Stadium: Stadium Municipal; Attendance: 22,049

2 March 2014 27	Paris Saint-Germain	2–0	Marseille	Paris
	Maxwell 50'; Cavani 79'	Report		Stadium: Parc des Princes; Attendance: 45,483

8 March 2014 28	Bastia	0–3	Paris Saint-Germain	Bastia
		Report	Ibrahimović 7'; Lavezzi 19', 88'	Stadium: Stade Armand-Cesari; Attendance: 14,992

16 March 2014 29	Paris Saint-Germain	2–0	Saint-Étienne	Paris
	Ibrahimović 14', 41'	Report		Stadium: Parc des Princes; Attendance: 45,614

21 March 2014 30	Lorient	0–1	Paris Saint-Germain	Lorient
		Report	Motta 41'	Stadium: Stade du Moustoir; Attendance: 16,116

28 March 2014 31	Nice	0–1	Paris Saint-Germain	Nice
		Report	Kolodziejczak 52' (o.g.)	Stadium: Allianz Riviera; Attendance: 35,030

5 April 2014 32	Paris Saint-Germain	3–0	Reims	Paris
	Cavani 43'; Mandi 48', 89' (o.g.)	Report		Stadium: Parc des Princes; Attendance: 46,440

13 April 2014 33	Lyon	1–0	Paris Saint-Germain	Lyon
	Ferri 31'	Report		Stadium: Stade de Gerland; Attendance: 38,096

23 April 2014 34	Paris Saint-Germain	1–0	Evian	Paris
	Matuidi 89'	Report		Stadium: Parc des Princes; Attendance: 44,992

27 April 2014 35	Sochaux	1–1	Paris Saint-Germain	Montbéliard
	Thiago Silva 56' (o.g.)	Report	Cavani 24'	Stadium: Stade Auguste-Bonal; Attendance: 19,504

7 May 2014 36	Paris Saint-Germain	1–2	Rennes	Paris
	Lavezzi 3'	Report	Kadir 23'; Ntep 27'	Stadium: Parc des Princes; Attendance: 45,625

10 May 2014 37	Lille	1–3	Paris Saint-Germain	Villeneuve-d'Ascq
	Delaplace 90'	Report	Marquinhos 41'; Lucas 65'; Matuidi 82'	Stadium: Stade Pierre-Mauroy; Attendance: 48,960

17 May 2014 38	Paris Saint-Germain	4–0	Montpellier	Paris
	Lavezzi 2'; Ibrahimović 20'; Lucas 49'; Rabiot 88'	Report		Stadium: Parc des Princes; Attendance: 46,206

=== Coupe de France ===
8 January 2014 Round of 64	Brest	2–5	Paris Saint-Germain	Brest
	Lesoimier 33'; Ayité 89'	Report	Ibrahimović 10', 39', 42'; Motta 15'; Lavezzi 46'	Stadium: Stade Francis le Blé; Attendance: 7,000

22 January 2014 Round of 32	Paris Saint-Germain	1–2	Montpellier	Paris
	Cavani 30'	Report	Congré 20'; Montaño 69'	Stadium: Parc des Princes; Attendance: 45,000

=== Coupe de la Ligue ===
18 December 2013 Round of 16	Paris Saint-Germain	2–1 (a.e.t.)	Saint-Étienne	Paris
	Cavani 25', 119'	Report	Erdinç 78'	Stadium: Parc des Princes; Attendance: 45,608

14 January 2014 Quarter-finals	Bordeaux	1–3	Paris Saint-Germain	Bordeaux
	Poko 48'	Report	Pastore 45+1'; Rabiot 85'; Matuidi 88'	Stadium: Stade Chaban-Delmas; Attendance: 29,250

4 February 2014 Semi-finals	Nantes	1–2	Paris Saint-Germain	Nantes
	Veigneau 81'	Report	Ibrahimović 5', 90'	Stadium: Stade de la Beaujoire; Attendance: 35,714

19 April 2014 Final	Lyon	1–2	Paris Saint-Germain	Saint-Denis
	Lacazette 56'	Report	Cavani 4', 32' (pen.)	Stadium: Stade de France; Attendance: 78,489

=== UEFA Champions League ===
==== Group stage ====
Pos	Team	Pld	W	D	L	GF	GA	GD	Pts	Qualification	PAR	OLY	BEN	AND
1	(France) Paris Saint-Germain	6	4	1	1	16	5	+11	13	Advance to knockout phase	—	2–1	3–0	1–1
2	(Greece) Olympiacos	6	3	1	2	10	8	+2	10 (Note: Head-to-head points: Olympiacos 4, Benfica 1.)	Advance to knockout phase	1–4	—	1–0	3–1
3	(Portugal) Benfica	6	3	1	2	8	8	0	10	Transfer to Europa League	2–1	1–1	—	2–0
4	(Belgium) Anderlecht	6	0	1	5	4	17	−13	1		0–5	0–3	2–3	—

Source: UEFA
Notes:

17 September 2013 1	Olympiacos (Greece)	1–4	(France) Paris Saint-Germain	Piraeus, Greece
	Weiss 25'	Report	Cavani 19'; Motta 68', 73'; Marquinhos 86'	Stadium: Karaiskakis Stadium; Attendance: 29,000

2 October 2013 2	Paris Saint-Germain (France)	3–0	(Portugal) Benfica	Paris, France
	Ibrahimović 5', 30'; Marquinhos 25'	Report		Stadium: Parc des Princes; Attendance: 44,732

23 October 2013 3	Anderlecht (Belgium)	0–5	(France) Paris Saint-Germain	Anderlecht, Belgium
		Report	Ibrahimović 17', 22', 36', 62'; Cavani 52'	Stadium: Constant Vanden Stock Stadium; Attendance: 17,000

5 November 2013 4	Paris Saint-Germain (France)	1–1	(Belgium) Anderlecht	Paris, France
	Ibrahimović 70'	Report	De Zeeuw 68'	Stadium: Parc des Princes; Attendance: 43,091

27 November 2013 5	Paris Saint-Germain (France)	2–1	(Greece) Olympiacos	Paris, France
	Ibrahimović 7'; Cavani 90'	Report	Manolas 80'	Stadium: Parc des Princes; Attendance: 44,000

10 December 2013 6	Benfica (Portugal)	2–1	(France) Paris Saint-Germain	Lisbon, Portugal
	Lima 45' (pen.); Gaitán 58'	Report	Cavani 37'	Stadium: Estádio da Luz; Attendance: 27,717

==== Knockout phase ====
===== Round of 16 =====
18 February 2014 First leg	Bayer Leverkusen (Germany)	0–4	(France) Paris Saint-Germain	Leverkusen, Germany
		Report	Matuidi 3'; Ibrahimović 39' (pen.), 42'; Cabaye 88'	Stadium: BayArena; Attendance: 29,412

12 March 2014 Second leg	Paris Saint-Germain (France)	2–1 (6–1 agg.)	(Germany) Bayer Leverkusen	Paris, France
	Marquinhos 13'; Lavezzi 53'	Report	Sam 6'	Stadium: Parc des Princes; Attendance: 45,596

===== Quarter-finals =====
2 April 2014 First leg	Paris Saint-Germain (France)	3–1	(England) Chelsea	Paris, France
	Lavezzi 3'; David Luiz 61' (o.g.); Pastore 90+3'	Report	Hazard 27' (pen.)	Stadium: Parc des Princes; Attendance: 45,517

8 April 2014 Second leg	Chelsea (England)	2–0 (3a–3 agg.)	(France) Paris Saint-Germain	London, England
	Schürrle 32'; Ba 87'	Report		Stadium: Stamford Bridge; Attendance: 38,080
