= Grégory Sertic =

French footballer (born 1989)

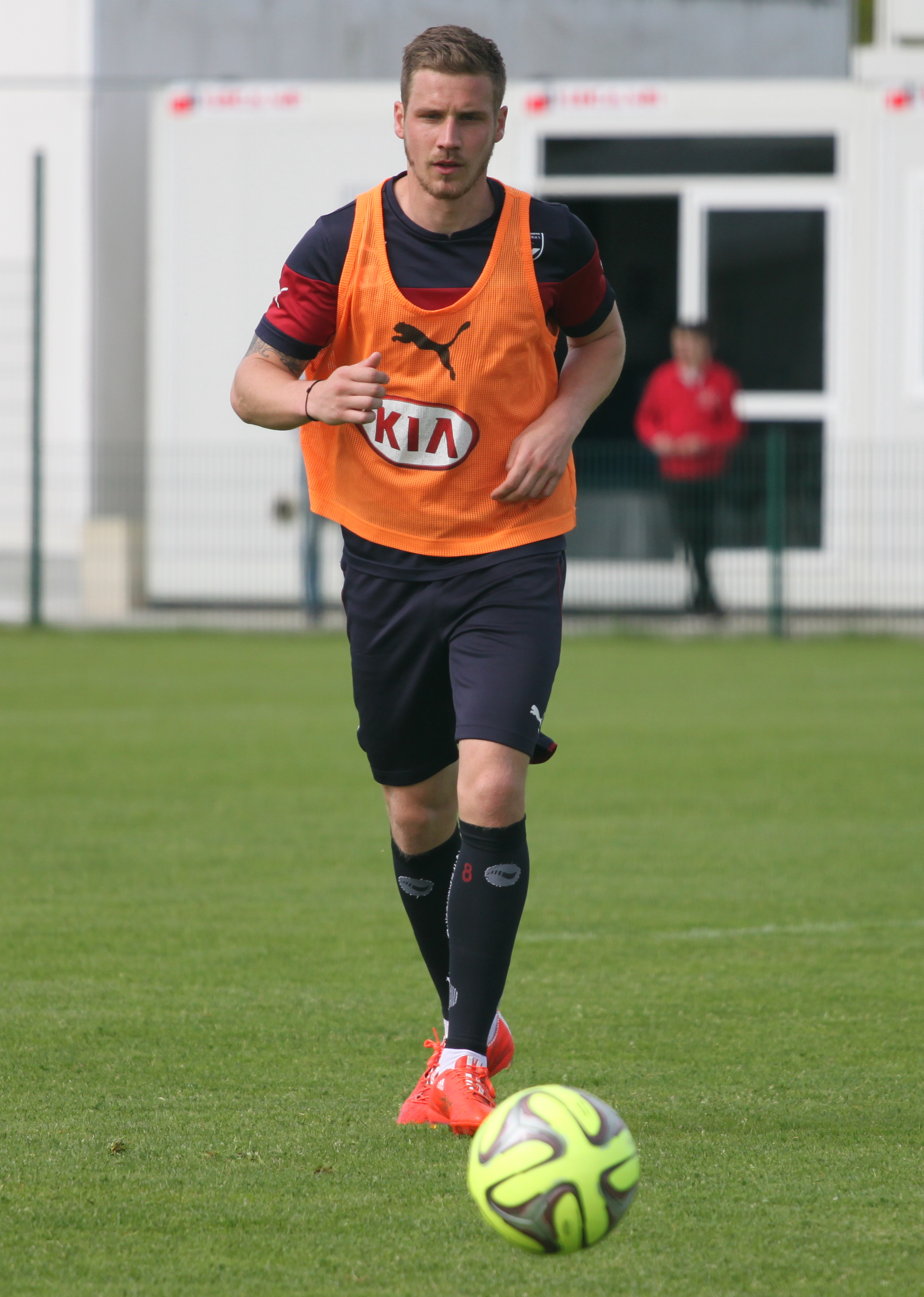
- Sertic training with Bordeaux in 2015

Personal information
- Date of birth: 5 August 1989 (age 37)
- Place of birth: Brétigny-sur-Orge, France
- Height: 1.83 m (6 ft 0 in)
- Position: Defensive midfielder

Youth career
- 1995–1997: AS Egly Football
- 1997–2002: CSF Brétigny
- 2002-2003: Viry-Châtillon
- 2002–2005: INF Clairefontaine
- 2003-2004: CSF Brétigny
- 2005–2007: Bordeaux

Senior career*
Years	Team	Apps	(Gls)
2007–2016	Bordeaux II	31	(7)
2009–2017	Bordeaux	137	(6)
2010–2011	→ Lens (loan)	23	(0)
2011	→ Lens II (loan)	3	(0)
2017–2020	Marseille	19	(0)
2019	Marseille II	2	(0)
2019	→ Zürich (loan)	11	(0)
Total		226	(13)

International career
2009–2010	France U21	5	(0)
- * Club domestic league appearances and goals

Grégory Sertic (Croatian: Sertić; born 5 August 1989) is a French retired professional footballer who played as a defensive midfielder.

== Club career ==
=== Bordeaux ===
Born in Brétigny-sur-Orge, Essonne of Croatian descent, Sertic joined FC Girondins de Bordeaux's youth system at the age of 15, from the famed INF Clairefontaine academy. During the 2007–08 season, spent in the Championnat de France Amateur with the senior reserves, he earned praise from first team manager Laurent Blanc.

Sertic made his debut in Ligue 1 on 29 April 2009, starting in a 3–2 away win against Stade Rennais FC. His maiden competitive appearance had taken place on 11 November of the previous year, in the 4–2 home victory over En Avant de Guingamp in the round of 16 of the Coupe de la Ligue where he came on as a late substitute. His first goal in the former competition was scored in only his second appearance, helping the hosts defeat FC Sochaux-Montbéliard 3–0.

For the 2010–11 season, Sertic was loaned to fellow league club RC Lens.

=== Marseille ===
On 30 January 2017, Sertic signed a three-and-a-half-year contract with Olympique de Marseille. During his spell at the Stade Vélodrome, he played sparingly due to an anterior cruciate ligament injury.

In February 2019, Sertic moved to FC Zürich of the Swiss Super League until the end of the season. He announced his retirement in November 2020 at the age of 31, and immediately started working as a pundit for Canal+.

== International career ==
On 25 May 2009, Sertic was called up for the first time to the France under-21 side which was due to participate in that year's Toulon Tournament. He made his debut in the competition on 6 June, playing 36 minutes in the 1–0 group stage defeat of Portugal.

Sertic was granted Croatian citizenship in March 2013, as his paternal grandfather was a native of Brinje who moved to the French capital. However, FIFA did not allow him to play for that national team due to new rules about naturalisation of players : he did not have Croatian nationality when he represented France U-21, and neither did his parents.

== Career statistics ==
=== Club ===
Appearances and goals by club, season and competition
Club	Season	League			National cup (Note: Includes the Coupe de France.)		League cup (Note: Includes the Coupe de la Ligue.)		Continental		Other		Total	
Club	Season	Division	Apps	Goals	Apps	Goals	Apps	Goals	Apps	Goals	Apps	Goals	Apps	Goals
Bordeaux	2008–09	Ligue 1	6	1	0	0	0	0	0	0	0	0	6	1
Bordeaux	2009–10	Ligue 1	12	0	1	0	2	0	3 (Note: Three appearances in the 2009–10 UEFA Champions League)	0	0	0	18	0
Bordeaux	2011–12	Ligue 1	18	0	3	0	1	0	—		0	0	22	0
Bordeaux	2012–13	Ligue 1	26	0	6	1	1	0	11 (Note: Eleven appearances in the 2012–13 UEFA Europa League)	0	0	0	44	1
Bordeaux	2013–14	Ligue 1	30	3	1	0	1	0	4 (Note: Four appearances in the 2013–14 UEFA Europa League)	0	1 (Note: One appearance in the 2013 Trophée des Champions)	0	37	3
Bordeaux	2014–15	Ligue 1	27	1	1	0	2	0	—		0	0	30	1
Bordeaux	2015–16	Ligue 1	1	0	0	0	0	0	2 (Note: Two appearances in the 2015–16 UEFA Europa League)	0	0	0	3	0
Bordeaux	2016–17	Ligue 1	17	1	1	0	1	0	—		0	0	19	1
Bordeaux	Total		137	6	13	1	8	0	20	0	1	0	179	7
Bordeaux II	2010–11	CFA 2	8	0	—		—		—		0	0	8	0
Bordeaux II	2013–14	CFA	1	0	—		—		—		0	0	1	0
Bordeaux II	2014–15	CFA	1	0	—		—		—		0	0	1	0
Bordeaux II	2015–16	CFA	1	0	—		—		—		0	0	1	0
Bordeaux II	Total		11	0	—		—		—		0	0	11	0
Lens (loan)	2010–11	Ligue 1	23	0	0	0	1	0	—		0	0	24	0
Lens II (loan)	2010–11	CFA	3	0	—		—		—		0	0	3	0
Marseille	2016–17	Ligue 1	8	0	1	0	—		—		0	0	9	0
Marseille	2017–18	Ligue 1	7	0	0	0	—		4	0	0	0	11	0
Marseille	2018–19	Ligue 1	4	0	0	0	—		1	0	0	0	5	0
Marseille	Total		19	0	1	0	—		5	0	0	0	25	0
Marseille II	2017–18	National 2	2	0	0	0	—		—		0	0	2	0
FC Zürich (loan)	2018–19	Swiss Super League	11	0	1	0	—		—		0	0	12	0
Career total			206	6	15	1	9	0	25	0	1	0	256	7

== Honours ==
Bordeaux

- Ligue 1: 2008–09
- Coupe de France: 2012–13
- Coupe de la Ligue: 2008–09
- Trophée des Champions: 2009
