= Lucas Orbán =

Argentine footballer

Personal information
- Full name: Lucas Alfonso Orbán Alegre
- Date of birth: 3 February 1989 (age 37)
- Place of birth: Buenos Aires, Argentina
- Height: 1.79 m (5 ft 10 in)
- Position: Centre-back

Youth career
- River Plate

Senior career*
Years	Team	Apps	(Gls)
2008–2012	River Plate	10	(0)
2011–2012	→ Tigre (loan)	18	(0)
2012–2013	Tigre	29	(1)
2013–2014	Bordeaux	27	(0)
2014–2016	Valencia	29	(1)
2016	→ Levante (loan)	3	(0)
2016–2017	Genoa	11	(0)
2017–2022	Racing Club	53	(0)

International career^{‡}
2013–2015	Argentina	2	(0)
- * Club domestic league appearances and goals as of 04:38, 9 May 2023 (UTC) ‡ National team caps and goals as of 04:38, 9 May 2023 (UTC)

Lucas Alfonso Orbán Alegre (born 3 February 1989) is an Argentine former professional footballer who played as a centre-back. He made 2 appearances for the Argentina national team.

== Club career ==
=== River Plate ===
Born in Buenos Aires, Orbán graduated from local giants River Plate's youth system, and made his professional debut on 24 May 2009, starting in a 2–0 home win over Independiente.

=== Tigre ===
On 12 August 2011, after being sparingly used by River, Orbán was loaned to Tigre for the season. He appeared regularly for the latter, and scored his first professional goal on 19 August 2013, but in a 2–3 loss against former club River.

=== Bordeaux ===
On 31 July 2013 Orban signed a four-year deal with Ligue 1 side Girondins de Bordeaux. He made his debut in the competition on 13 September, starting in a 0–2 home loss against Paris Saint-Germain.

=== Valencia ===
On 11 August 2014, Orbán signed a five-year deal with La Liga's Valencia CF. He made his debut in the competition on 23 August, coming on as a late substitute and scoring an equalizer in a 1–1 away draw against Sevilla FC.

On 31 January 2016, Valencia reached an agreement to loan Orbán to Levante UD until 30 June 2016.

=== Genoa ===
On 31 August 2016, Orbán signed for Italian club Genoa.

=== Racing Club ===
In 2020, Orbán signed for Argentine club Racing club for a reported £7,000 per week contract.

== International career ==
On 13 November 2013, Orbán was called up to Argentina national football team by manager Alejandro Sabella, for the matches against Ecuador and Bosnia and Herzegovina. He made his international debut two days later, starting in a 0–0 draw. On 28 March 2015 he earned his 2nd cap in a 2–0 win over El Salvador.

== Honours ==
Racing Club

- Trofeo de Campeones de la Liga Profesional: 2022
