= Hervin Ongenda =

French footballer (born 1995)

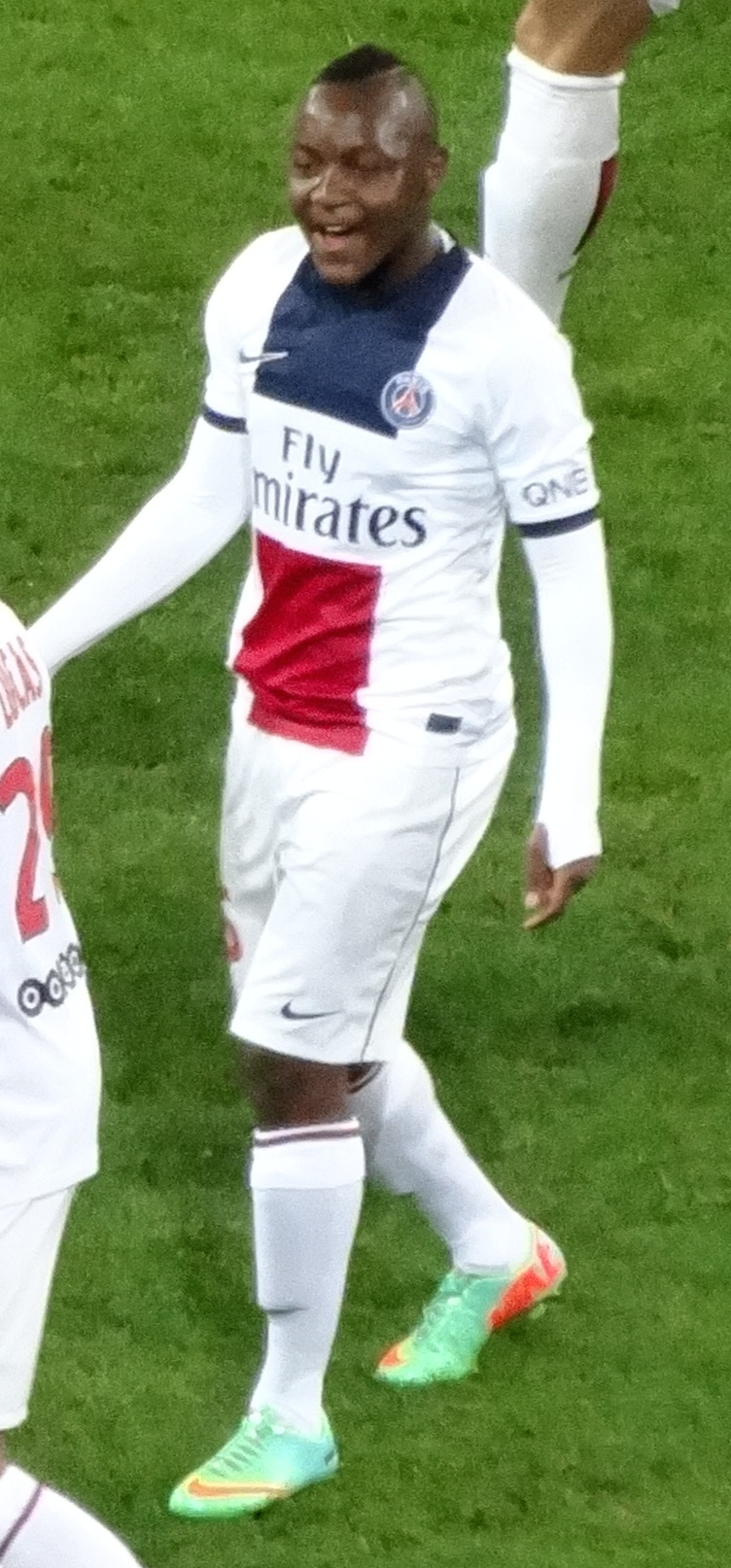
- Ongenda with Paris Saint-Germain in 2014

Personal information
- Date of birth: 24 June 1995 (age 31)
- Place of birth: Paris, France
- Height: 1.71 m (5 ft 7 in)
- Positions: Attacking midfielder; winger

Team information
- Current team: Botoșani
- Number: 26

Youth career
- 2003–2004: Paris FC
- 2004–2006: Les Lilas
- 2006–2013: Paris Saint-Germain

Senior career*
Years	Team	Apps	(Gls)
2012–2017	Paris Saint-Germain B	39	(13)
2013–2017	Paris Saint-Germain	11	(1)
2014–2015	→ Bastia (loan)	16	(0)
2014–2015	→ Bastia B (loan)	6	(2)
2017	PEC Zwolle	3	(0)
2018	Real Murcia	2	(0)
2018–2020	Botoșani	54	(6)
2020	Chievo	3	(0)
2020–2022	Botoșani	51	(7)
2022	Apollon Limassol	13	(1)
2023	Rapid București	4	(0)
2024–	Botoșani	75	(8)

International career
2010–2011	France U16	11	(8)
2011–2012	France U17	8	(0)
2012–2013	France U18	4	(1)
2013	France U19	3	(1)
2013	France U21	1	(0)
- * Club domestic league appearances and goals as of 23 October 2026

Hervin Ongenda (born 24 June 1995) is a French professional footballer who plays as an attacking midfielder or a winger for Liga I club Botoșani.

== Club career ==
The French newspaper Le Parisien described Ongenda as the best of a generation of French footballers which also included Kingsley Coman, Anthony Martial and Adrien Rabiot. Ongenda made his debut for Paris Saint-Germain on 6 January 2013, in a Coupe de France 4–3 victory over Arras.

On 3 August 2013, he featured in the Trophée des Champions against Bordeaux, coming on for Javier Pastore in the 73rd minute and scoring the equaliser eight minutes later as PSG went on to win 2–1. He registered his first Ligue 1 match at 9 August, in a 1–1 draw at Montpellier. Ongenda was loaned for the 2014–15 season to fellow league side Bastia. Upon his return in the capital, he scored his first Ligue 1 goal on 22 November 2015, in a 2–1 defeat of Lorient.

Ongenda joined Dutch side Zwolle in January 2017; he only played three games for Zwolle in a five-month period despite being signed for a 3.5-year deal. On 12 March 2018, having not made an official appearance in more than a year, he signed for Segunda División B side Real Murcia. After playing two games over a two-month period, he again left the club.

On 17 July 2018, Ongenda agreed a contract with Romanian team FC Botoșani. Ten days later, he made his Liga I debut in a 2–0 home victory against Hermannstadt. On 13 January 2020, he signed with Italian Serie B club Chievo until the end of the 2019–20 season, with an option to extend the contract until 2022. Ongenda returned to Botoșani in September 2020, after failing to make an impact during his stint in Italy.

== International career ==
Born in France, Ongenda is of DR Congolese descent. He is a former youth international for France, having played up to the France U21s.

== Career statistics ==
As of 23 October 2026.

Appearances and goals by club, season and competition
Club	Season	League			National cup (Note: Includes Coupe de France, Cupa României)		Europe		Other		Total	
Club	Season	Division	Apps	Goals	Apps	Goals	Apps	Goals	Apps	Goals	Apps	Goals
Paris Saint-Germain B	2012–13	CFA	5	2	—		—		—		5	2
Paris Saint-Germain B	2013–14	CFA	12	2	—		—		—		12	2
Paris Saint-Germain B	2015–16	CFA	16	8	—		—		—		16	8
Paris Saint-Germain B	2016-17	CFA	6	1	—		—		—		6	1
Paris Saint-Germain B	Total		39	13	—		—		—		39	13
Paris Saint-Germain	2012–13	Ligue 1	0	0	1	0	—		—		1	0
Paris Saint-Germain	2013–14	Ligue 1	6	0	1	0	0	0	1 (Note: Appearance in Trophée des Champions)	0	8	0
Paris Saint-Germain	2014–15	Ligue 1	0	0	—		—		1	0	1	0
Paris Saint-Germain	2015–16	Ligue 1	5	1	1	0	0	0	0	0	6	1
Paris Saint-Germain	Total		11	1	3	0	0	0	2	0	16	1
Bastia (loan)	2014–15	Ligue 1	16	0	0	0	—		3 (Note: Appearance in Coupe de la Ligue)	0	19	0
Bastia B (loan)	2014–15	CFA 2	6	2	—		—		—		6	2
PEC Zwolle	2016–17	Eredivisie	3	0	—		—		—		3	0
Real Murcia	2017–18	Segunda División B	2	0	—		—		—		2	0
Botoșani	2018–19	Liga I	37	3	0	0	—		—		37	3
Botoșani	2019–20	Liga I	17	3	0	0	—		—		17	3
Botoșani	Total		54	6	0	0	—		—		108	7
Chievo	2019–20	Serie B	3	0	—		—		—		3	0
Botoșani	2020–21	Liga I	31	4	2	0	—		—		33	4
Botoșani	2021–22	Liga I	20	3	1	0	—		—		21	3
Botoșani	Total		51	7	3	0	—		—		108	7
Apollon Limassol	2021–22	Cypriot First Division	8	1	—		—		—		8	1
Apollon Limassol	2022–23	Cypriot First Division	5	0	0	0	8 (Note: Two appearances in UEFA Champions League and one goal, two appearances in UEFA Europa League, four appearances in UEFA Europa League)	1	0	0	13	1
Apollon Limassol	Total		13	1	—		8	1	0	0	21	2
Rapid Bucureşti	2022–23	Liga I	4	0	—		—		—		4	0
Botoșani	2024–25	Liga I	29	1	3	0	—		—		32	1
Botoșani	2025–26	Liga I	35	7	1	0	—		1 (Note: Appearances in Liga I European play-offs)	0	37	7
Botoșani	2026–27	Liga I	11	0	0	0	—		—		11	0
Botoșani	Total		75	8	4	0	—		1	0	80	8
Career total			277	38	10	0	8	1	6	0	301	39

== Honours ==
Paris Saint-Germain

- Ligue 1: 2012–13, 2013–14, 2015–16
- Coupe de France: 2015–16
- Coupe de la Ligue: 2013–14, 2015–16
- Trophée des Champions: 2013, 2014, 2015, 2016

Bastia

- Coupe de la Ligue runner-up: 2014–15

Apollon Limassol

- Cypriot First Division: 2021–22
- Cypriot Super Cup: 2022

Individual

- Titi d'Or: 2008, 2011
