= 2012–13 Coupe de France =

The Coupe Charles Simon

Tournament details
- Country: France
- Teams: 7,656

Final positions
- Champions: Bordeaux
- Runners-up: Evian

Tournament statistics
- Top goal scorer(s): Cheick Diabaté (6 goals)

The 2012–13 Coupe de France was the 96th season of the most prestigious cup competition of France. The competition was organized by the French Football Federation (FFF) and open to all clubs in French football, as well as clubs from the overseas departments and territories (Guadeloupe, French Guiana, Martinique, Mayotte, New Caledonia, French Polynesia, and Réunion). The final was contested on 31 May 2013 at the Stade de France in Saint-Denis. The defending champions were Lyon, who defeated Quevilly 1–0 in the final of the 2011–12 season, but lost this season in the Round of 64 against Épinal. The winner of the competition, Bordeaux, qualified for the group stage of the 2013–14 UEFA Europa League.

== Calendar ==
On 1 June 2012, the FFF announced the calendar for the 96th Coupe de France season.

On 4 October 2012, the French Football Federation confirmed that the final of the Coupe de France would be moved up a day from 1 June to 31 May. The change occurred due to the final match of the 2012–13 Top 14 season being contested at the Stade de France on 1 June, which would have conflicted with the Coupe de France final.

Round	First match date	Fixtures	Clubs	New entries this round	Prize money	Notes
First Round	18 August 2012	—				
Second Round	1 September 2012	—				
Third Round	16 September 2012	—				Clubs participating in CFA 2 gain entry.
Fourth Round	30 September 2012	—				Clubs participating in CFA gain entry.
Fifth Round	14 October 2012	—				Clubs participating in National gain entry.
Sixth Round	28 October 2012	—		none		
Seventh Round	17 November 2012	88	196 → 108			Clubs participating in Ligue 2 gain entry.
Eighth Round	8 December 2012	44	108 → 64	none		
Round of 64	5 January 2013	32	64 → 32	20		Clubs participating in Ligue 1 gain entry.
Round of 32	22 January 2013	16	32 → 16	none		
Round of 16	26 February 2013	8	16 → 8	none		
Quarter-finals	16 April 2013	4	8 → 4	none		
Semi-finals	7 May 2013	2	4 → 2	none		
Final	31 May 2013	1	2 → 1	none		Coupe de France Final at the Stade de France.

== Regional qualifying rounds ==
All of the teams that enter the competition, but are not members of Ligue 1 or Ligue 2, have to compete in the regional qualifying rounds. The regional qualifying rounds determine the number of regional clubs that will earn spots in the 7th round and normally lasts six rounds.

== Seventh Round ==
The draw for the seventh round of the Coupe de France was held on 31 October 2012 at the headquarters of the Comité National Olympique et Sportif Français (CNOSF), the national sporting committee of France, and was conducted by Guy Ferrier, the France women's under-17 coach that won the 2012 FIFA U-17 Women's World Cup, as well as former footballers Jérôme Alonzo and Daniel Rodighiero. The overseas regional draw was conducted on the previous day. The matches will be played on 17–18 November.

Tie no	Home team	Score	Away team
1	Ytrac	1–0	Balma
2	Muret	3–2	Narbonne
3	Labrède	2–1	Marmande
4	Stade Montois	0–0 (a.e.t.) (4–5 p)	Tarbes
5	Nîmes	1–1 (a.e.t.) (4–2 p)	Luzenac
6	Aurillac	2–0	Colomiers
7	Stade Bordelais	1–0	Pau
8	Toulouse Rodéo	0–3	Châteauroux
9	Saint-Jean Beaulieu	3–1	Corte
10	Neuville	1–2	CA Bastia
11	Agde	3–2	Entente Nord Lozère
12	Avenir Foot Lozère	1–0	Uzès Pont du Gard
13	Toulon	1–3 (a.e.t.)	AS Monaco
14	Salinières Aigues-Mortes	1–2	Marseille Consolat
15	Berre	0–2	Martigues
16	Roche Saint-Genest	0–1	Arles-Avignon
17	Feyzin	1–1 (a.e.t.) (3–4 p)	Pontarlier
18	Moulins	2–0	Lyon Duchère
19	Vénissieux	1–1 (a.e.t.) (8–7 p)	Grenoble
20	Bourg-Péronnas	1–0	Auxerre
21	Yzeure	1–1 (a.e.t.) (4–3 p)	Clermont
22	Millery Vourles	1–2	Vallières
23	Thiers	3–3 (a.e.t.) (0–3 p)	Limonest
24	Savigneux Montbrisson	2–0	Louhans-Cuiseaux
25	ES Metz	0–0 (a.e.t.) (9–10 p)	Haguenau
26	Bar le Duc	2–1	Schirrheim
27	Dijon	1–2 (a.e.t.)	Sedan
28	Biesheim	2–6	Metz
29	Marly	1–1 (a.e.t.) (1–3 p)	Vitry
30	Strasbourg	6–0	Wittemheim
31	Espérance Saint-Dizier	1–2	Raon-l'Étape
32	Amnéville	2–0	Épernay Champagne
33	Saint-Louis Neuweg	2–0	Gazélec Ajaccio
34	Quetigny	0–7	Belfort
35	Belleville Saint-Jean	0–2	Istres
36	Roche Novillars	0–3	Montceau Bourgogne
37	Illzach Modenheim	2–3	Épinal
38	Thaon	1–1 (a.e.t.) (5–4 p)	Dijon Parc
39	Sainte-Marguerite	2–1	Belfort Sud
40	Dommartin Tour	0–2	Villefranche

Tie no	Home team	Score	Away team
41	Guérétoise	0–1	Niort
42	Blois	3–0	Périgny
43	Poitiers	0–1	Vendée Fontenay
44	Ancenis 44	0–1	Vendée Poiré sur Vie
45	Romorantin	0–1	Nantes
46	Montmorillon	0–1	Limoges
47	La Roche-sur-Yon	0–5	Chauray
48	Olympique Saumur	0–2	Vendée Luçon
49	Plabennec	2–0	Avranches
50	Saint-Renan	2–1 (a.e.t.)	Plobannalec
51	Saint-Saturnin Arche	2–2 (a.e.t.) (5–4 p)	Montagnarde
52	Stade Pontivy	2–1 (a.e.t.)	Changé
53	Val d'Izé	0–1	Angers
54	Stade Léonard	1–1 (a.e.t.) (4–2 p)	Moncé
55	Plouzané	0–1	Laval
56	Le Rheu	0–2	Carquefou
57	Saint-Colomban Sportive Locminé	3–4	Sablé-sur-Sarthe
58	Aubervilliers	0–3	Le Mans
59	Camon	1–2	AC Amiens
60	Enquin Les Mines	0–6	Stade Portelois
61	Arras	2–2 (a.e.t.) (6–5 p)	Saint-Omer
62	Lens	3–0	Les Lilas
63	Aire-sur-la-Lys	0–2	Rouen
64	Marck	0–0 (a.e.t.) (3–4 p)	Chambly
65	Lesquin	0–2	Les Mureaux
66	Saint Amand	3–1	Beauvais
67	Boulogne-sur-Mer	2–1	Drancy
68	Breteuil	1–3	Caen
69	Raismes Vicoigne	1–2	Racing Colombes 92
70	Chantilly	0–2	Reims Sainte-Anne
71	Avion	1–2	Meaux
72	Cambrai	0–2	Armentières
73	Fleury Mérogis	2–1	Tours
74	Brétigny	0–2	Le Havre
75	Courseulles	3–4	Guingamp
76	Évry	1–1 (a.e.t.) (4–2 p)	Orléans
77	Évreux	2–2 (a.e.t.) (5–4 p)	Cesson Sévigné
78	Dreux	0–0 (a.e.t.) (4–3 p)	Viry-Châtillon
79	Lyre	1–2	Vitré
80	Aulnay	0–2	Mondeville
81	Hérouville	0–2	Saint-Malo

=== Overseas region ===
Tie no	Home team	Score	Away team
1	Lössi	0–3	Mulhouse
2	Le Geldar	1–4	Dieppe
3	Club Colonial	0–1	Vertou
4	Colmar	5–0	Morne-à-l'Eau

Tie no	Home team	Score	Away team
5	Dunkerque	3–2 (a.e.t.)	Saint-Pauloise
6	Compiègne	2–1	Mtsapéré
7	Pontivy	5–1	Tefana

== Eighth round ==
Team 1	Score	Team 2
Laval	1–2	Guingamp
Saint-Renan	0–1	Nantes
Reims Sainte-Anne	0–5	Caen
Saint Amand	1–3	Le Havre
Agde	0–1	Chauray
Limonest	0–1	Arles-Avignon
Vallières	0–2	CA Bastia
AS Monaco	0–0 (a.e.t.) (6–7 p)	Bourg-Péronnas
Savigneux Montbrisson	2–1	Villefranche
Saint-Louis Neuweg	1–3	Épinal
Pontarlier	2–2 (a.e.t.) (6–5 p)	Colmar
Stade Bordelais	1–0	Niort
AV Lozère	4–2	Limoges
Tarbes	0–5	Nîmes
Montceau Bourgogne	2–0	Mulhouse
Arras	1–0 (a.e.t.)	Angers
AC Amiens	1–0	Racing Colombes 92
Amnéville	2–0	Fleury Mérogis
Compiègne	0–4	Dieppe
Armentières	0–6	Lens
Stade Pontivy	1–4	Vendée Luçon
Sablé-sur-Sarthe	2–2 (a.e.t.) (3–5 p)	Plabennec
Vitré	1–2	Vendée Fontenay
Aurillac	0–1	Istres
Yzeure	0–1	Moulins
Vitry	0–3	Boulogne-sur-Mer
Dreux	2–2 (a.e.t.) (4–3 p)	Évry
Stade Léonard	0–5	Carquefou
Mondeville	0–1 (a.e.t.)	Châteauroux
Évreux	0–1	Le Mans
Vertou	3–0	Saint-Saturnin Arche
Bar le Duc	2–3	Raon-l'Étape
Labrède	0–1 (a.e.t.)	Muret
Saint-Jean Beaulieu	0–0 (a.e.t.) (1–3 p)	Vénissieux
Sainte-Marguerite	0–1	Belfort
Les Mureaux	0–1	Metz
Stade Portelois	1–1 (a.e.t.) (5–3 p)	Dunkerque
Ytrac	1–6	Vendée Poiré sur Vie
Martigues	1–4	Marseille Consolat
Meaux	1–0 (a.e.t.)	Chambly
Blois	0–2 (a.e.t.)	Rouen
Strasbourg	0–1	Sedan
Pontivy	0–3	Saint-Malo
Haguenau	2–3	Thaon

== Round of 64 ==
Team 1	Score	Team 2
Marseille Consolat	1–1 (a.e.t.) (4–5 p)	Moulins
Belfort	1–3	Le Havre
Le Mans	1–2	Vendée Poiré sur Vie
Savigneux Montbrisson	1–1 (a.e.t.) (1–3 p)	Vénissieux
AC Amiens	1–1 (a.e.t.) (3–5 p)	Evian
Amnéville	1–2 (a.e.t.)	Raon-l'Étape
Thaon	0–1	Sochaux
Montceau Bourgogne	0–1	Troyes
Stade Bordelais	1–0	Carquefou
Dreux	1–5	Nancy
Chauray	1–5	Lorient
Rouen	1–1 (a.e.t.) (3–2 p)	Ajaccio
Boulogne-sur-Mer	0–1	Toulouse
Saint-Malo	1–1 (a.e.t.) (2–4 p)	Vertou
Plabennec	1–0	Reims
Lille	3–2	Nîmes
Bourg-Péronnas	1–2	Montpellier
Muret	0–2	Vendée Fontenay
Épinal	3–3 (a.e.t.) (4–2 p)	O. Lyonnais
Metz	2–3 (a.e.t.)	Nice
Caen	2–3	Saint-Étienne
Châteauroux	2–3	Bordeaux
O. Marseille	2–1 (a.e.t.)	Guingamp
Lens	2–1	Rennes
Meaux	1–0	Stade Portelois
Pontarlier	1–2	Sedan
AV Lozère	2–0	Arles-Avignon
Vendée Luçon	1–1 (a.e.t.) (2–4 p)	Brest
CA Bastia	2–0	SC Bastia
Dieppe	2–3	Nantes
Arras	3–4	Paris SG
Istres	3–3 (a.e.t.) (4–3 p)	Valenciennes

== Round of 32 ==
Tie no	Home team	Score	Away team
1	Fontenay	0–5	Troyes
2	CA Bastia	1–3	Brest
3	Sedan	0–1	Lorient
4	Plabennec	1–3	Lille
5	Moulins	1–2	Bordeaux
6	Rouen	1–2	Marseille
7	Meaux	0–0 (a.e.t.) (3–5 p)	Saint-Étienne
8	Nice	2–2 (a.e.t.) (2–4 p)	Nancy

Tie no	Home team	Score	Away team
9	Épinal	1–1 (a.e.t.) (4–3 p)	Nantes
10	Vertou	0–2	Evian
11	Raon-l'Étape	1–0	Istres
12	Lozère	0–3	Le Havre
13	Vénissieux	0–0 (a.e.t.) (4–3 p)	Poiré sur Vie
14	Paris SG	3–1	Toulouse
15	Montpellier	2–3 (a.e.t.)	Sochaux
16	Stade Bordelais	0–3	Lens

== Round of 16 ==
Tie no	Home team	Score	Away team
1	Lorient (1)	3–0	Brest (1)
2	Paris SG (1)	2–0	Marseille (1)
3	Raon-l'Étape (4)	2–2 (a.e.t.) (3–5 p)	Bordeaux (1)
4	Evian (1)	3–1	Le Havre (2)

Tie no	Home team	Score	Away team
5	Sochaux (1)	1–2	Troyes (1)
6	Vénissieux (5)	0–2 (a.e.t.)	Nancy (1)
7	Saint-Étienne (1)	3–2	Lille (1)
8	Lens (2)	2–0	Épinal (3)

== Quarter-finals ==
16 April 2013	Troyes (1)	3–0	Nancy (1)	Troyes
18:00	Bréchet 53'; Faussurier 74'; Camus 81'	Report		Stadium: Stade de l'Aube; Attendance: 7,789; Referee: Tony Chapron

16 April 2013	Saint-Étienne (1)	1–2	Lorient (1)	Saint-Étienne
20:50	Aubameyang 74'	Report	Barthelme 43'; Aliadière 90+2'	Stadium: Stade Geoffroy-Guichard; Attendance: 19,256; Referee: Saïd Ennjimi

17 April 2013	Evian (1)	1–1 (a.e.t.) (4–1 p)	Paris Saint-Germain (1)	Annecy
20:55	Khelifa 44'	Report	Pastore 9'	Stadium: Parc des Sports; Attendance: 14,925; Referee: Philippe Kalt
	Penalties
	Sorlin (penalty scored); Sagbo (penalty scored); Khelifa (penalty scored); Barbosa (penalty scored)		(penalty missed) Ibrahimović; (penalty missed) Silva; (penalty scored) Lavezzi

17 April 2013	Lens (2)	2–3	Bordeaux (1)	Lens
19:00	Carrasso 11' (o.g.); Bergdich 90+2'	Report	Sertic 59'; Diabaté 81', 85'	Stadium: Stade Bollaert-Delelis; Attendance: 38,256; Referee: Clément Turpin

== Semi-finals ==
Evian reached the semi-finals of the Coupe de France for the first time in their history.

8 May 2013	Evian (1)	4–0	Lorient (1)	Annecy
21:00	Ninković 10'; Sagbo 20'; Bérigaud 33'; Baouia 80'	Report		Stadium: Parc des Sports; Attendance: 14,118; Referee: Laurent Duhamel

14 May 2013	Troyes (1)	1–2	Bordeaux (1)	Troyes
20:55	Bahebeck 7'	Report	Diabaté 41'; Bréchet 63' (o.g.)	Stadium: Stade de l'Aube; Attendance: 18,456; Referee: Tony Chapron

== Final ==
Evian reached the final for the first time in their history. Bordeaux won their fourth Coupe de France – and first since 1987 – after a 3–2 victory against Evian.

31 May 2013
20:45 CEST

Bordeaux	3–2	Evian
Diabaté 39', 89'; Saivet 53'	Report	Sagbo 51'; Dja Djédjé 70'

Stade de France, Saint-Denis
Attendance: 77,000
Referee: Fredy Fautrel (Basse Normandie)

== Media coverage ==
For the fifth consecutive season in France, France Télévisions were the free to air broadcasters while Eurosport were the subscription broadcasters.

These matches were broadcast live on French television:

Round	France Télévisions	Eurosport
Seventh Round		
Eighth round		
Round of 64		
Round of 32		
Round of 16		
Quarter-finals		
Semi-finals		
Final		
