= Henri Saivet =

Senegalese footballer (born 1990)

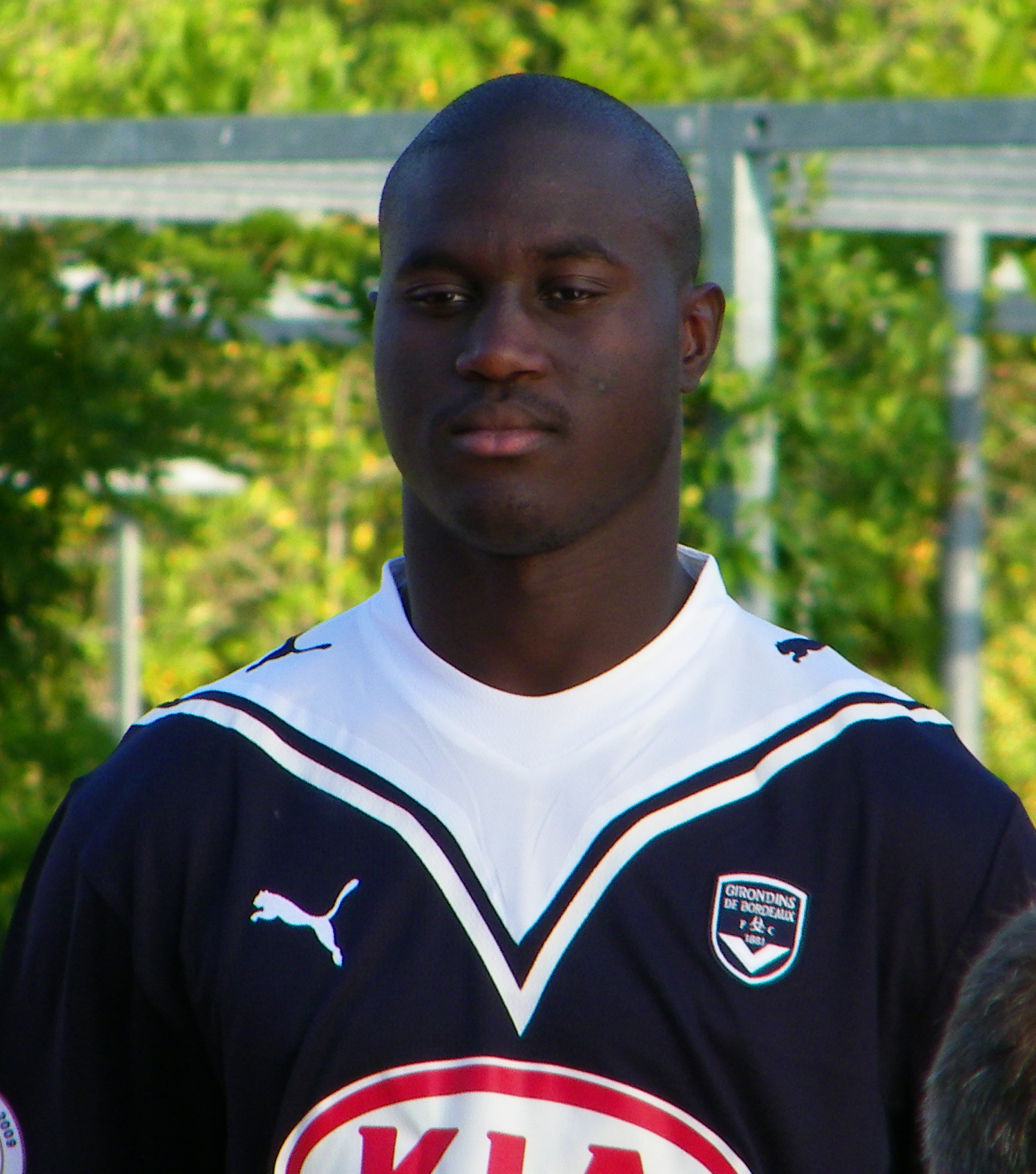
- Saivet with Bordeaux in 2008

Personal information
- Full name: Henri Grégoire Saivet
- Date of birth: 26 October 1990 (age 36)
- Place of birth: Dakar, Senegal
- Height: 1.74 m (5 ft 9 in)
- Position: Midfielder

Team information
- Current team: Caen

Youth career
- 1999–2002: US Cergy Clos
- 2002–2007: Bordeaux

Senior career*
Years	Team	Apps	(Gls)
2006–2010	Bordeaux B	57	(9)
2007–2016	Bordeaux	134	(17)
2011	→ Angers (loan)	18	(3)
2016–2021	Newcastle United	5	(1)
2016–2017	→ Saint-Étienne (loan)	27	(1)
2018	→ Sivasspor (loan)	12	(0)
2018–2019	→ Bursaspor (loan)	29	(2)
2022–2024	Pau	66	(15)
2024–2026	Clermont	45	(5)
2026–	Caen	0	(0)

International career
2005–2006	France U16	15	(8)
2006–2007	France U17	21	(9)
2007–2008	France U18	4	(1)
2010–2012	France U21	12	(4)
2013–2019	Senegal	31	(1)
Medal record
Africa Cup of Nations
Runner-up	2019
- * Club domestic league appearances and goals as of 12 May 2026

Henri Grégoire Saivet (born 26 October 1990) is a Senegalese professional footballer who plays as a midfielder for Ligue 3 club Caen. Although initially a France youth international, he played for the Senegal national team from 2013 to 2019.

Saivet began his career with Bordeaux, making his debut aged 17, and spent nine years at the club before being signed by English club Newcastle United. He made few appearances for Newcastle and was loaned out to Saint-Étienne, and Turkish clubs Sivasspor and Bursaspor before leaving in 2021. After a year without a club, he signed for Pau. In 2024, after two seasons with Pau, he joined Clermont.

== Club career ==
=== Bordeaux ===
In 2007, Saivet signed his first professional contract with Bordeaux, thus making him the youngest professional player in the history of the club. He subsequently made his professional debut during the 2007–08 season, at the age of 17, in a league match against Lens. Saivet scored a goal in the final of the 2013 Coupe de France to help Bordeaux defeat Evian 3–2.

=== Newcastle United ===
On 11 January 2016, Bordeaux manager Willy Sagnol confirmed that he gave Saivet permission to leave the club. Later that day Saivet officially signed a five-and-a-half-year contract with Newcastle United, joining for a reported fee of £5 million.

After playing just four matches starting twice in half a season with Newcastle United, Saivet joined Saint-Étienne on a season-long loan on 23 August 2016 without a purchase option given to Saint-Étienne.

On 23 August 2017, Saivet played his first game for Newcastle since 6 February 2016, starting an EFL Cup tie against Nottingham Forest. He was recalled to the first team on 23 December and scored a free kick in a 3–2 Premier League win against West Ham.

On 25 August 2018, it was announced that Saivet would join Turkish club Bursaspor on loan for the season.

=== Later career ===
In June 2022, Saivet joined French club Pau. After two seasons with the club, he signed for Clermont on a two-year contract on 13 June 2024.

== International career ==
He made his debut for Senegal on 14 August 2013.

== Career statistics ==
=== Club ===
As of 1 July 2021

Appearances and goals by club, season and competition
Club	Season	League			National cup		League cup		Continental, Other		Total	
Club	Season	Division	Apps	Goals	Apps	Goals	Apps	Goals	Apps	Goals	Apps	Goals
Bordeaux B	2006–07	CFA	8	1	0	0	0	0	0	0	8	1
Bordeaux B	2007–08	CFA	17	2	0	0	0	0	0	0	17	2
Bordeaux B	2008–09	CFA	6	1	0	0	0	0	0	0	6	1
Bordeaux B	2009–10	CFA	26	5	0	0	0	0	0	0	26	5
Bordeaux B	Total		57	9	0	0	0	0	0	0	57	9
Bordeaux	2007–08	Ligue 1	1	0	0	0	0	0	0	0	1	0
Bordeaux	2008–09	Ligue 1	1	0	0	0	0	0	0	0	1	0
Bordeaux	2009–10	Ligue 1	3	0	1	0	1	0	1	0	6	0
Bordeaux	2010–11	Ligue 1	6	0	2	0	2	0	0	0	10	0
Bordeaux	2011–12	Ligue 1	24	1	2	0	0	0	0	0	26	1
Bordeaux	2012–13	Ligue 1	34	8	6	1	1	0	8	0	49	9
Bordeaux	2013–14	Ligue 1	33	6	2	0	2	1	5	1	42	8
Bordeaux	2014–15	Ligue 1	14	0	1	0	1	0	0	0	16	0
Bordeaux	2015–16	Ligue 1	18	2	0	0	1	0	8	1	27	3
Bordeaux	Total		134	17	14	1	8	1	22	2	178	21
Angers (loan)	2010–11	Ligue 2	18	3	2	1	0	0	0	0	20	4
Newcastle United	2015–16	Premier League	4	0	0	0	0	0	0	0	4	0
Newcastle United	2017–18	Premier League	1	1	2	0	1	0	0	0	4	1
Newcastle United	2019–20	Premier League	0	0	0	0	0	0	0	0	0	0
Newcastle United	2020–21	Premier League	0	0	0	0	0	0	0	0	0	0
Newcastle United	Total		5	1	2	0	1	0	0	0	8	1
Saint-Étienne (loan)	2016–17	Ligue 1	27	1	1	0	0	0	7	0	35	1
Sivasspor (loan)	2017–18	Süper Lig	12	0	0	0	0	0	0	0	12	0
Bursaspor (loan)	2018–19	Süper Lig	29	2	0	0	0	0	0	0	29	2
Career total			282	33	19	2	9	1	29	2	339	38

=== International ===
As of 27 July 2019

Appearances and goals by national team and year
National team	Year	Apps	Goals
Senegal	2013	4	0
Senegal	2014	1	0
Senegal	2015	9	0
Senegal	2016	0	0
Senegal	2017	8	1
Senegal	2018	2	0
Senegal	2019	7	0
Total		31	1

Scores and results list Senegal's goal tally first, score column indicates score after each Saivet goal.

List of international goals scored by Henri Saivet
No.	Date	Venue	Opponent	Score	Result	Competition
1	19 January 2017	Stade de Franceville, Franceville, Gabon	Zimbabwe	2–0	2–0	2017 Africa Cup of Nations

== Honours ==
Bordeaux

- Coupe de France: 2012–13
- Coupe de la Ligue: 2008–09

Senegal

- Africa Cup of Nations runner-up: 2019
