= Landry Nguémo =

Cameroonian footballer (1985–2024)

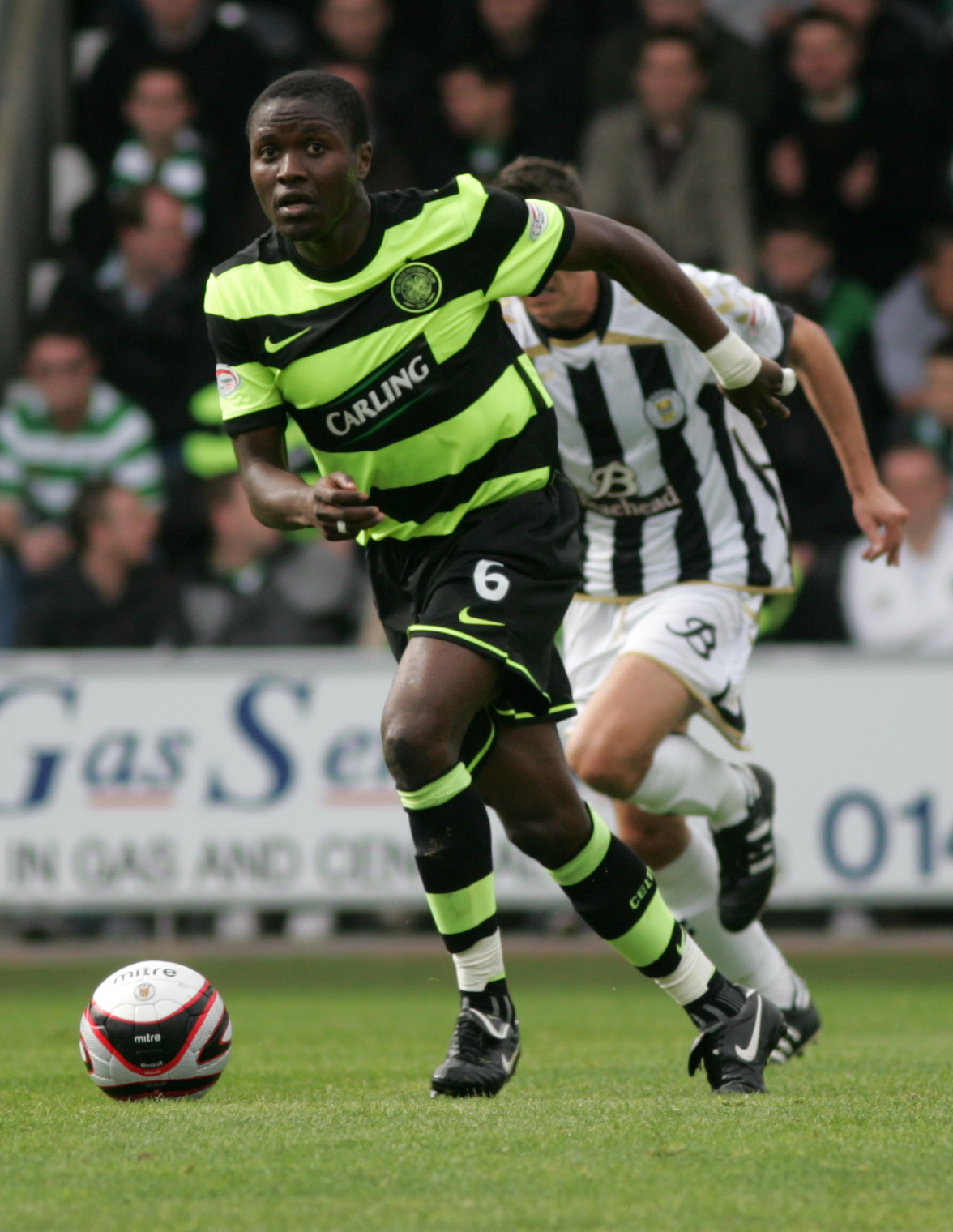
- Nguémo playing for Celtic in 2009

Personal information
- Full name: Joël Landry Tsafack Nguémo
- Date of birth: 28 November 1985
- Place of birth: Yaoundé, Cameroon
- Date of death: 27 June 2024 (aged 38)
- Place of death: Obala, Centre Region, Cameroon
- Height: 1.73 m (5 ft 8 in)
- Position: Defensive midfielder

Youth career
- 2001–2005: Nancy

Senior career*
Years	Team	Apps	(Gls)
2005–2011	Nancy	127	(4)
2009–2010	→ Celtic (loan)	35	(0)
2011–2014	Bordeaux	67	(2)
2015	Saint-Étienne	14	(1)
2015–2017	Akhisar Belediyespor	21	(2)
2017	Kayserispor	9	(0)
2019	Kongsvinger IL	21	(0)
Total		294	(9)

International career
2006–2014	Cameroon	42	(3)

Managerial career
- 2020–2021: COS Villers-les-Nancy U18 (youth)
- 2021–2024: Nancy (youth)
Medal record
Men's association football
Representing Cameroon
Africa Cup of Nations
Silver medal – second place	2008 Ghana	Team
- * Club domestic league appearances and goals

Joël Landry Tsafack Nguémo (28 November 1985 – 27 June 2024) was a Cameroonian professional footballer who played as a defensive midfielder for Nancy, Bordeaux and Saint-Étienne in France and for Scottish club Celtic on loan. Nguémo played for the Cameroon national team from 2006 until 2014, including at the 2010 and 2014 World Cups. From 2020 until his death in 2024, he coached youth football teams, one of which was Nancy.

== Club career ==
=== Early career ===
Nguémo was a native of Dschang, a town in western Cameroon, he played for various local teams in Dschang before moving to Yaounde aged 13.

He spent a short time in EMC.

=== Nancy ===
Nguémo was spotted by scouts of Nancy in Yaoundé and was promptly invited to France where he had trials before signing for the club aged 15. He made his debut aged 19 in August 2005 as a substitute against Lyon in a league match. He made his first start one month later against Troyes.

In January 2009, Nguémo said he would welcome a move away from the club after being linked by French and English media with moves to Arsenal, Sunderland and Everton.

On 31 January 2009, Nguémo scored his first goal for Nancy, a dramatic 90th-minute winner in a match against Le Havre. His second goal for the club also came in dramatic circumstances when he again netted in the 90th minute on 23 May 2009 against Marseille but Nancy were beaten 2–1.

=== Loan to Celtic ===
After days of speculation, on 16 July 2009, Nguémo completed a one-year loan move to Celtic with an option to make it permanent. He wore the number 6 shirt the squad number previously allotted to Bobo Baldé. Nguémo's debut came in the 0–0 draw against Cardiff City where he was picked as Celtic's man of the match. He made his competitive debut in the first leg of a Champions League qualifying tie against Dynamo Moscow in Glasgow, losing 1–0. He was also part of the team that won 2–0 in the return leg in Moscow, sending Celtic through to play Arsenal in the final qualifier for the Champions League. He made his league debut away to Aberdeen in a 3–1 win for Celtic.

In total Nguémo made 35 appearances for Celtic without scoring. At the end of his loan period the two clubs were unable to agree a transfer fee for Nguémo and so he returned to AS Nancy.

=== Bordeaux ===
On 4 July 2011, Nguémo moved from Nancy to Ligue 1 rivals Bordeaux, signing a three-year contract. He played in 33 of Bordeaux's 38 league fixtures in his first season there, helping the club to fifth place and qualification for the following season's Europa League. On 3 October 2013 in a Europa League tie against Maccabi Tel Aviv, Nguémo suffered what was initially suspected to be a minor heart attack. He was substituted and taken to hospital where he underwent extensive tests, with nothing untoward found. Nguémo stated on his Twitter account afterwards that "There is nothing serious. I went back home from hospital after an electrocardiogram" and he returned to first team action just over two weeks later in a Ligue 1 match against Lyon.

=== Saint-Etienne ===
In January 2015, Nguémo signed a six-month contract with Saint-Étienne.

=== Turkish football ===
On 29 August 2015, Nguémo signed with Turkish Süper Lig club Akhisar Belediyespor on a three-year contract after being released from Saint-Étienne at the end of the 2014–15 season.

Nguémo joined another Turkish club, Kayserispor, in January 2017, signing a contract until 2019.

=== Kongsvinger and retirement ===
After a spell at Norwegian side Kongsvinger in 2019, Nguémo retired from football.

== International career ==
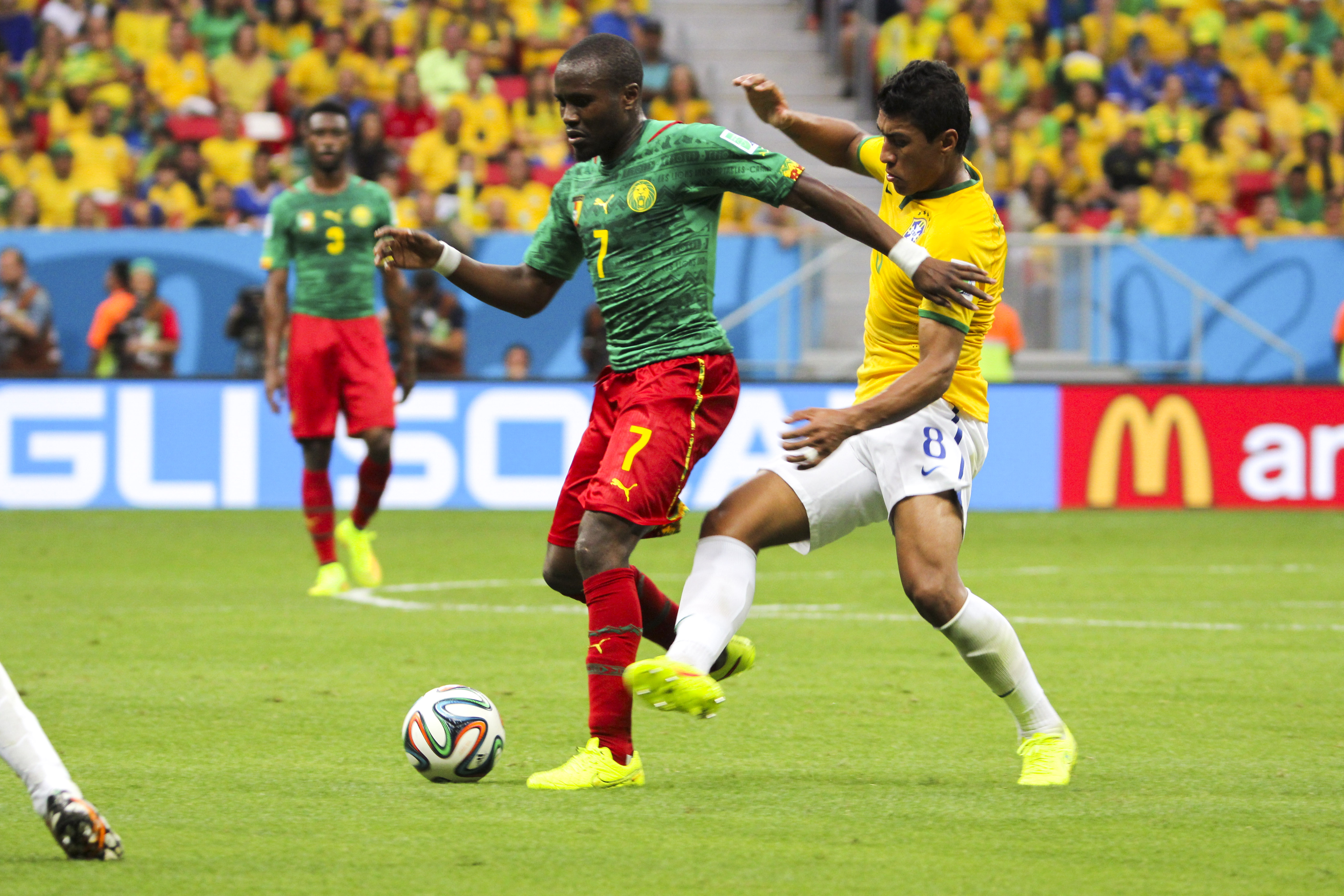
N'Guémo battles Brazil midfielder Paulinho for the ball during the 2014 FIFA World Cup on 23 June.

Nguémo made 42 appearances for the Cameroon national team, scoring three goals and being part of the squad that finished runners-up at the 2008 Africa Cup of Nations.

== Coaching career ==
In May 2020, Nguémo was named U18 manager of French club COS Villers-les-Nancy. In June 2021, Nguémo was hired as a youth coach at his former club, AS Nancy.

== Personal life and death ==
Nguémo was a keen falconer and kept a modest collection of bird of prey, with his favourite, a white-tailed eagle named Mr George after George Weah.

He obtained French citizenship by naturalization in December 2007.

Nguémo died in a traffic collision near the town of Obala in the night between 26 and 27 June 2024. He was 38.

== Honours ==
Nancy

- French League Cup: 2006

Cameroon

- Africa Cup of Nations runner-up: 2008
