= Abdoulaye Keita (footballer, born 1990) =

French footballer

Personal information
- Full name: Abdoulaye Keita
- Date of birth: 16 August 1990 (age 36)
- Place of birth: Clichy-la-Garenne, France
- Height: 1.84 m (6 ft 0 in)
- Position: Goalkeeper

Youth career
- Clairefontaine
- 2006–2008: Bordeaux

Senior career*
Years	Team	Apps	(Gls)
2008–2013	Bordeaux B	10	(0)
2009–2014	Bordeaux	2	(0)
2014–2015	Fontenay	26	(0)
2015–2016	Trélissac		
2020–2021	Fontenay		

International career
2006	France U-17	7	(0)
2008–2009	France U-19	6	(0)
- * Club domestic league appearances and goals as of 15:00, 7 April 2019 (UTC)

Abdoulaye Keita (born 16 August 1990) is a French footballer who plays as a goalkeeper.

== Career ==
Born in Clichy-la-Garenne, Keita began his career 2006 in the youth side for FC Girondins de Bordeaux and made his first team debut against Paris Saint-Germain on 10 April 2010 in the Ligue 1.

== International career ==
Born in France, Keita is of Malian descent. He is former French international Under-17 and under 19 player, he played the 2007 FIFA U-17 World Cup, where he made three appearances.
