= Jussiê =

Brazilian footballer (born 1983)

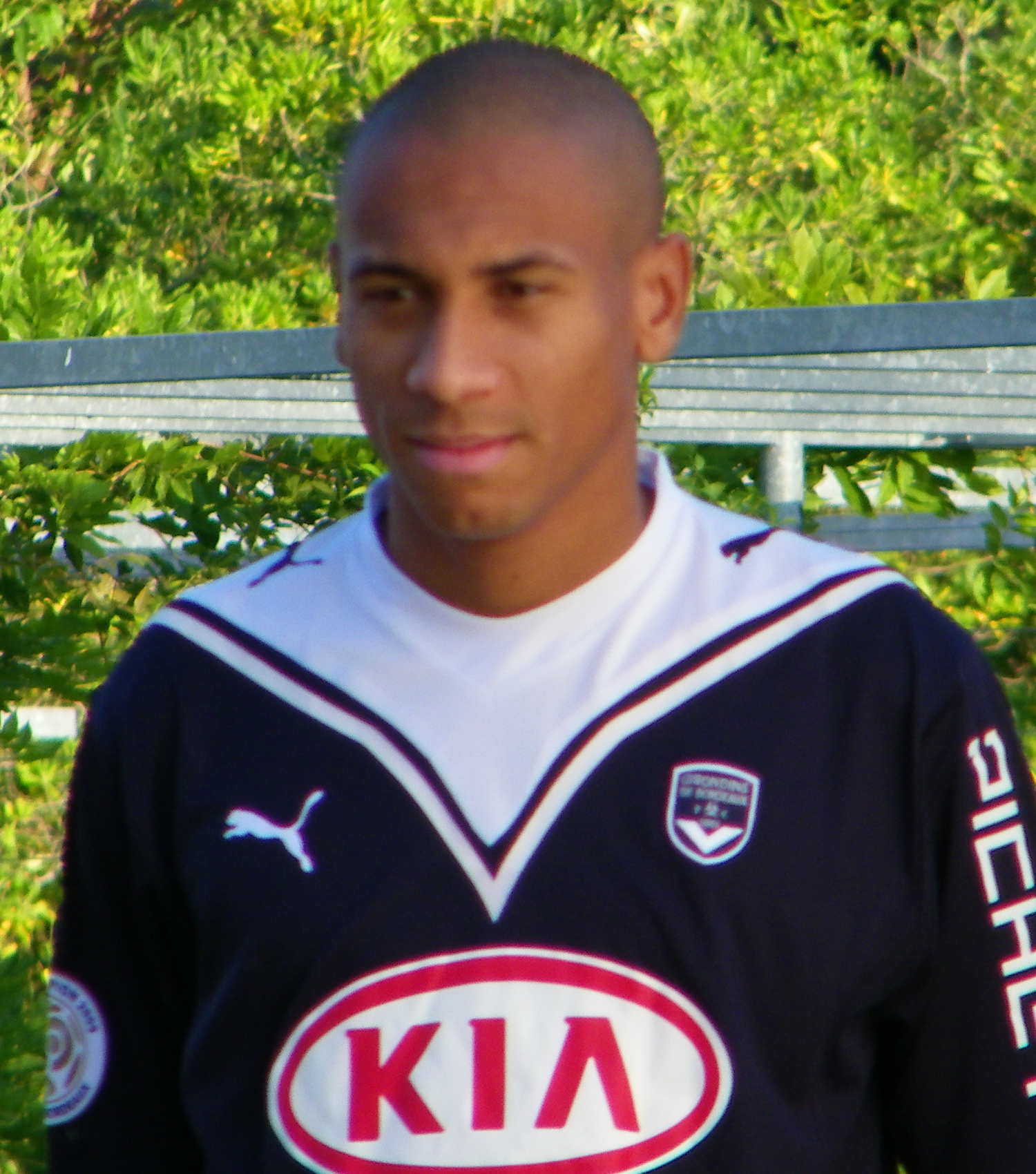
- Jussiê with Bordeaux

Personal information
- Full name: Jussiê Ferreira Vieira
- Date of birth: 19 September 1983 (age 43)
- Place of birth: Nova Venécia, Brazil
- Height: 1.81 m (5 ft 11 in)
- Position: Second striker

Senior career*
Years	Team	Apps	(Gls)
2001–2005	Cruzeiro	58	(13)
2003	→ Kashiwa Reysol (loan)	17	(5)
2005–2007	Lens	68	(13)
2007	→ Bordeaux (loan)	16	(2)
2007–2016	Bordeaux	182	(30)
2013	→ Al Wasl (loan)	12	(1)
Total		353	(64)
- * Club domestic league appearances and goals

Jussiê Ferreira Vieira (born 19 September 1983), commonly known as Jussiê, is a Brazilian former professional footballer who played as a second striker.

== Career ==
=== Early career ===
Born in Nova Venécia, Espírito Santo, Jussiê began his career at Cruzeiro in 2001. In mid-2003, he was loaned to J1 League side Kashiwa Reysol, where he scored a total of 5 goals in 17 matches in the league.

=== Lens ===
On 30 January 2005, Jussiê joined Lens from Cruzeiro for a reported fee of €3.5 million, on a five-year contract.

=== Bordeaux ===
In January 2007, Jussiê joined Bordeaux on loan. On 3 February 2007, he played his first Ligue 1 match for Bordeaux against Nice. He went on to make 16 appearances in the league scoring 2 goals as Bordeaux finished in sixth place. In his club's Coupe de la Ligue final against Lyon he came on as a substitute contributing to a 1–0 win which not only earned Bordeaux the cup but also UEFA Cup qualification.

On 4 June 2007, Jussiê joined Bordeaux permanently on a four-year contract, for an undisclosed fee.

He received French nationality in January 2011.

Jussiê left Bordeaux in summer 2016 after eight years with the club as his contract was not renewed. He expressed disappointment about finding out about his departure via the club website, stating "Given the way I go, inevitably, there is bitterness. I did not understand. I have not had a single call from the president nor anyone. I know that economically, it is a bit complicated for the club. But my story with the Girondins is not a money story".

In February 2017, he announced his retirement from professional football. It had been reported he would play for French amateur club Stade Bordelais but he was denied a playing license by the French Football Federation.

== Career statistics ==
Appearances and goals by club, season and competition
Club	Season	League			Cup (Note: Includes Coupe de France, Coupe de la Ligue, Trophée des champions)		Continental (Note: Includes UEFA Champions League, UEFA-Cup/UEFA Europa League)		Total	
Club	Season	Division	Apps	Goals	Apps	Goals	Apps	Goals	Apps	Goals
Cruzeiro	2001	Série A	8	1	0	0	0	0	8	1
Cruzeiro	2002	Série A	8	0	0	0	0	0	8	0
Cruzeiro	2003	Série A	1	0	0	0	0	0	1	0
Cruzeiro	Total		17	1	0	0	0	0	17	1
Kashiwa Reysol	2003	J1 League	17	5	0	0	0	0	17	5
Cruzeiro	2004	Série A	41	12	0	0	0	0	41	12
Lens	2004–05	Ligue 1	12	1	0	0	7	0	19	1
Lens	2005–06	Ligue 1	35	6	2	0	0	0	37	6
Lens	2006–07	Ligue 1	21	6	1	0	4	0	26	6
Lens	Total		68	13	3	0	11	0	82	13
Bordeaux	2006–07	Ligue 1	16	2	1	0	0	0	17	2
Bordeaux	2007–08	Ligue 1	22	4	2	0	3	2	27	6
Bordeaux	2008–09	Ligue 1	20	2	3	0	2	2	25	4
Bordeaux	2009–10	Ligue 1	30	4	5	0	7	1	42	5
Bordeaux	2010–11	Ligue 1	31	4	2	0	0	0	33	4
Bordeaux	2011–12	Ligue 1	28	6	3	2	0	0	31	8
Bordeaux	2012–13	Ligue 1	15	1	1	0	6	4	22	5
Bordeaux	2013–14	Ligue 1	22	9	1	1	4	1	27	11
Bordeaux	2015–16	Ligue 1	14	0	3	1	4	1	21	2
Bordeaux	Total		198	32	21	4	26	11	245	47
Al Wasl (loan)	2013	UAE Pro League	12	1	1	1	0	0	13	2
Career total			353	64	25	5	37	11	415	80

== Honours ==
Cruzeiro

- Campeonato Mineiro: 2003, 2004

Lens

- UEFA Intertoto Cup: 2005

Bordeaux

- Ligue 1: 2009
- Coupe de la Ligue: 2007, 2009
- Trophée des Champions: 2009
