= 2016–17 Olympique de Marseille season =

Olympique de Marseille
2016–17 season
- President: Vincent Labrune (until 24 July 2016); Giovanni Ciccolunghi (from 25 July to 16 October 2016); Jacques-Henri Eyraud (from 17 October 2016)
- Manager: Franck Passi (until 20 October 2016); Rudi Garcia (from 20 October 2016)
- Stadium: Stade Vélodrome
- Ligue 1: 5th
- Coupe de France: Round of 16
- Coupe de la Ligue: Round of 16
- Top goalscorer: League: Bafétimbi Gomis (20); All: Bafétimbi Gomis (21)
- Highest home attendance: 65,252 vs PSG (26 February 2017)
- Lowest home attendance: 25,121 vs Nantes (25 September 2016)
- Average home league attendance: 39,894
Home colours	Away colours	Third colours

The 2016–17 Olympique de Marseille season was the 67th professional season of the club since its creation in 1899 and 21st consecutive season in the top flight.

== Players ==
French teams are limited to four players without EU citizenship. Hence, the squad list includes only the principal nationality of each player; several non-European players on the squad have dual citizenship with an EU country. Also, players from the ACP countries—countries in Africa, the Caribbean, and the Pacific that are signatories to the Cotonou Agreement—are not counted against non-EU quotas due to the Kolpak ruling.

=== Current squad ===
As of 29 January 2017.

Note: Flags indicate national team as defined under FIFA eligibility rules; some limited exceptions apply. Players may hold more than one non-FIFA nationality.

No.	Pos.	Nation	Player
1	GK	FRA	Brice Samba
2	DF	JPN	Hiroki Sakai
3	DF	BRA	Dória
4	DF	NED	Karim Rekik
5	MF	FRA	Abou Diaby
6	DF	POR	Rolando
7	MF	FRA	Rémy Cabella
8	MF	FRA	Morgan Sanson
10	MF	ARG	Lucas Ocampos
11	FW	FRA	Dimitri Payet
12	DF	CMR	Henri Bedimo
13	MF	FRA	Grégory Sertic
14	FW	CMR	Clinton N'Jie (on loan from Tottenham Hotspur)
15	DF	SVK	Tomáš Hubočan
16	GK	FRA	Yohann Pelé
17	DF	SEN	Bouna Sarr
18	FW	FRA	Bafétimbi Gomis (Captain, on loan from Swansea City)
19	MF	FRA	William Vainqueur (on loan from Roma)

No.	Pos.	Nation	Player
20	MF	TUN	Saîf-Eddine Khaoui
21	DF	FRA	Patrice Evra
22	FW	BEL	Aaron Leya Iseka (on loan from Anderlecht)
23	MF	FRA	Zinédine Machach (on loan from Toulouse)
24	DF	FRA	Rod Fanni
25	MF	NZL	Bill Tuiloma
26	FW	FRA	Florian Thauvin (on loan from Newcastle United)
27	MF	FRA	Maxime Lopez
28	FW	FRA	Antoine Rabillard
29	MF	CMR	André-Frank Zambo Anguissa
30	GK	FRA	Steve Mandanda
32	FW	FRA	Jérémie Porsan-Clemente
33	FW	TUR	Yusuf Sari
35	DF	FRA	Stéphane Sparagna
40	GK	FRA	Florian Escales

=== Out on loan ===
Note: Flags indicate national team as defined under FIFA eligibility rules; some limited exceptions apply. Players may hold more than one non-FIFA nationality.

No.	Pos.	Nation	Player
—	GK	FRA	Julien Fabri (on loan to Bourg-Péronnas)
—	DF	FRA	Baptiste Aloé (on loan to Valenciennes)
—	DF	ARM	Gaël Andonian (on loan to Veria)

== Competitions ==
=== Ligue 1 ===
==== League table ====
Pos	Team	Pld	W	D	L	GF	GA	GD	Pts	Qualification or relegation
3	Nice	38	22	12	4	63	36	+27	78	Qualification for the Champions League third qualifying round
4	Lyon	38	21	4	13	77	48	+29	67	Qualification for the Europa League group stage (Note: Since the winners of the 2016–17 Coupe de France and the 2016–17 Coupe de la Ligue, Paris Saint-Germain, qualified for European competition based on league position, the spot awarded to the Coupe de France winners (Europa League group stage) was passed to the fourth-placed team and the spot awarded to the Coupe de la Ligue winners (Europa League third qualifying round) was passed to the sixth-placed team. The fifth-placed team received the spot in Europa League third qualifying round originally designated to the fourth-placed team.)
5	Marseille	38	17	11	10	57	41	+16	62	Qualification for the Europa League third qualifying round
6	Bordeaux	38	15	14	9	53	43	+10	59	Qualification for the Europa League third qualifying round
7	Nantes	38	14	9	15	40	54	−14	51	

Source: Ligue 1, Soccerway
Rules for classification: 1) Points; 2) Goal difference; 3) Goals scored; 4) Head-to-head goal difference; 5) Fairplay ranking.

==== Results summary ====
Overall								Home						Away					
Pld	W	D	L	GF	GA	GD	Pts	W	D	L	GF	GA	GD	W	D	L	GF	GA	GD
38	17	11	10	57	41	+16	62	13	4	2	33	13	+20	4	7	8	24	28	−4

Last updated: 14 May 2017.
Source: Competitive matches

==== Results by round ====
Round	1	2	3	4	5	6	7	8	9	10	11	12	13	14	15	16	17	18	19	20	21	22	23	24	25	26	27	28	29	30	31	32	33	34	35	36	37	38
Ground	H	A	H	A	H	A	H	A	H	A	H	A	H	A	A	H	A	H	A	H	A	H	A	H	A	H	H	A	H	A	H	A	H	A	A	H	A	H
Result	D	L	W	L	D	L	W	D	W	D	D	L	W	L	D	W	W	W	W	L	L	W	L	W	L	W	L	W	W	D	D	D	W	D	W	W	D	W
Position	12	16	12	14	15	15	13	14	12	11	10	12	11	12	11	10	9	6	6	6	7	6	6	6	6	6	7	6	5	5	6	6	6	6	6	5	5	5

Source: Ligue 1
A = Away; H = Home; W = Win; D = Draw; L = Loss

==== Matches ====
Win Draw Loss

14 August 2016 1	Marseille	0–0	Toulouse	Marseille
20:45 CEST (UTC+02:00)	Diaby (yellow card) 26'; Dória (yellow card) 58'; Cabella (yellow card) 83'	Report	Toivonen (yellow card) 70'	Stadium: Stade Vélodrome; Attendance: 37,364; Referee: Benoît Millot

21 August 2016 2	Guingamp	2–1	Marseille	Guingamp
15:00 CEST (UTC+02:00)	Salibur 1'; Sorbon 58'	Report	Dória (yellow card) 22'; Thauvin 78'	Stadium: Stade du Roudourou; Attendance: 16,056; Referee: Benoît Bastien

26 August 2016 3	Marseille	2–0	Lorient	Marseille
20:45 CEST (UTC+02:00)	Cabella 19'; Hubočan (yellow card) 48'; Gomis 70'	Report	Touré (yellow card) 51'	Stadium: Stade Vélodrome; Attendance: 26,193; Referee: Antony Gautier

11 September 2016 4	Nice	3–2	Marseille	Nice
20:45	Balotelli 7' (pen.), 78'; Koziello (yellow card) 71'; Ricardo (yellow card) 86'; Cyprien 88'	Report	Thauvin 14'; Zambo Anguissa (yellow card) 31'; Dória (yellow card) 66'; Gomis 72' (pen.); Machach (yellow card) 87'	Stadium: Allianz Riviera; Attendance: 31,194; Referee: Frank Schneider

17 September 2016 5	Marseille	0–0	Lyon	Marseille
21:00 CEST (UTC+02:00)	Hubočan (yellow card) 28'; Zambo Anguissa (yellow card) 77'; Machach (yellow card) 83'	Report	Tousart (yellow card) 68'; Yanga-Mbiwa (yellow card) 81'	Stadium: Stade Vélodrome; Attendance: 32,564; Referee: Antony Gautier

21 September 2016 6	Rennes	3–2	Marseille	Rennes
21:00 CEST (UTC+02:00)	Fernandes (yellow card) 26'; Sio 41'; Grosicki 86' (pen.); Hunou 89'	Report	Gomis 44' (pen.), 50'; Machach (yellow card) 56' (yellow-red card) 65'; Cabella (yellow card) 90+2'	Stadium: Roazhon Park; Attendance: 21,583; Referee: Ruddy Buquet

25 September 2016 7	Marseille	2–1	Nantes	Marseille
20:45 CEST (UTC+02:00)	Zambo Anguissa (yellow card) 21'; N'Jie 22'; Gomis 53'	Report	Sala 2'; Kwateng (yellow card) 25'; Vizcarrondo (yellow card) 84'; Harit (yellow card) 90+2'	Stadium: Stade Vélodrome; Attendance: 25,121; Referee: Lionel Jaffredo

2 October 2016 8	Angers	1–1	Marseille	Angers
15:00 CEST (UTC+02:00)	Andreu (yellow card) 77'; Capelle 90+3'	Report	Thauvin 64'	Stadium: Stade Jean-Bouin; Attendance: 14,637; Referee: Johan Hamel

16 October 2016 9	Marseille	1–0	Metz	Marseille
20:45 CEST (UTC+02:00)	Gomis 13'; Diarra (yellow card) 90'	Report	Mandjeck (yellow card) 42'; Philipps (yellow card) 68'	Stadium: Stade Vélodrome; Attendance: 25,588; Referee: Jérôme Miguelgorry

23 October 2016 10	Paris Saint-Germain	0–0	Marseille	Paris
20:45 CET (UTC+1)		Report	Pelé (yellow card) 70'; Diarra (yellow card) 88'	Stadium: Parc des Princes; Attendance: 47,929; Referee: Clément Turpin

30 October 2016 11	Marseille	0–0	Bordeaux	Marseille
20:45 CET (UTC+1)	Fanni (yellow card) 57'	Report	Pallois (yellow card) 39'	Stadium: Stade Vélodrome; Attendance: 57,091; Referee: Nicolas Rainville

4 November 2016 12	Montpellier	3–1	Marseille	Montpellier
20:45 CET (UTC+1)	Boudebouz 4', 36'; Mounié 57'; Deplagne (yellow card) 69'	Report	Lopez (yellow card) 28'; Thauvin 52'	Stadium: Stade de la Mosson; Attendance: 18,451; Referee: Antony Gautier

20 November 2016 13	Marseille	1–0	Caen	Marseille
17:00 CET (UTC+1)	Machach (yellow card) 27'; Gomis (yellow card) 45+1'; Rolando 81'	Report	Seube (yellow card) 45+1'	Stadium: Stade Vélodrome; Referee: Stéphane Lannoy

26 November 2016 14	Monaco	4–0	Marseille	Fontvieille
17:10 CET (UTC+1)	Boschilia 23', (yellow card) 23'; Germain 29', 39'; Carrillo 90+1'	Report	Gomis (yellow card) 13'; Alessandrini (yellow card) 23'	Stadium: Stade Louis II; Attendance: 14,089; Referee: Clément Turpin

30 November 2016 15	Saint-Étienne	0–0	Marseille	Saint-Étienne
19:00 CEST (UTC+2)		Report		Stadium: Stade Geoffroy-Guichard; Referee: Benoît Bastien

4 December 2016 16	Marseille	3–0	Nancy	Marseille
17:00 CEST (UTC+2)	Thauvin 46'; Gomis 80'; N'Jie 90+3'	Report		Stadium: Stade Vélodrome; Attendance: 27,854; Referee: François Letexier

10 December 2016 17	Dijon	1–2	Marseille	Dijon
14:30 CEST (UTC+2)	Abeid 78'	Report	Lopez 6'; Gomis 87'	Stadium: Stade Gaston Gérard; Referee: Jérôme Miguelgorry

18 December 2016 18	Marseille	2–0	Lille	Marseille
17:00 CEST (UTC+2)	Gomis 56'; Thauvin 61'	Report		Stadium: Stade Vélodrome

21 December 2016 19	Bastia	1–2	Marseille	Bastia
20:05 CEST (UTC+2)	Djiku 83'	Report	Gomis 8'; N'Jie 90+1'	Stadium: Stade Armand Cesari; Referee: Benoît Millot

15 January 2017 20	Marseille	1–4	Monaco	Marseille
21:00 CEST (UTC+2)	Rolando 28'; Lopez (yellow card) 65'	Summary	Lemar 15'; Falcao 21'; Silva (yellow card) 34', (goal) 45', 56'	Stadium: Stade Vélodrome; Attendance: 43,814; Referee: Clément Turpin

22 January 2017 21	Lyon	3–1	Marseille	Lyon
21:00 CEST (UTC+2)	Yanga-Mbiwa (yellow card) 37'; Valbuena 43'; Lacazette 61', 75'	Report	Fanni (yellow card) 48'; Dória 67'; Sakai (yellow card) 85'	Stadium: Parc Olympique Lyonnais; Attendance: 48,147; Referee: Ruddy Buquet

27 January 2017 22	Marseille	5–1	Montpellier	Marseille
20:45 CEST (UTC+2)	Gomis 4', 19', 77'; Rolando 38'; Dória (yellow card) 80'; Thauvin 88' (pen.)	Report	Boudebouz 49'; Sessègnon (yellow card) 87'; Rémy (red card) 87'	Stadium: Stade Vélodrome; Attendance: 28,527; Referee: Tony Chapron

3 February 2017 23	Metz	1–0	Marseille	Metz
20:45 CEST (UTC+2)	Doukouré (yellow card) 58'; Jouffre 83'	Report	Thauvin (yellow card) 33'; Sakai (yellow card) 82'; Fanni (yellow card) 90+1'	Stadium: Stade Saint-Symphorien; Attendance: 21,011; Referee: Mikael Lesage

8 February 2017 24	Marseille	2–0	Guingamp	Marseille
20:45 CEST (UTC+2)	Gomis 26', (yellow card) 42'; Payet 76'; Rolando (yellow card) 77'	Report	Coco (yellow card) 38'	Stadium: Stade Vélodrome; Attendance: 28,560; Referee: Benoît Millot

12 February 2017 25	Nantes	3–2	Marseille	Nantes
20:45 CEST (UTC+2)	Diego Carlos 12', (yellow card) 42'; Stępiński 20'; Thomasson 50'; Djidji (yellow card) 53'	Report	Thauvin (yellow card) 43'; Gomis 49', 61'	Stadium: Stade de la Beaujoire; Attendance: 32,471; Referee: François Letexier

18 February 2017 26	Marseille	2–0	Rennes	Marseille
20:45 CEST (UTC+2)	N'Jie 59'; Vainqueur (yellow card) 61'; Thauvin 64'	Report		Stadium: Stade Vélodrome; Attendance: 45,395; Referee: Mikael Lesage

26 February 2017 27	Marseille	1–5	Paris Saint-Germain	Marseille
20:45 CEST (UTC+2)	Evra (yellow card) 38'; Fanni 69'; Cabella (yellow card) 84'	Report	Marquinhos 4'; Cavani 16'; Verratti (yellow card) 29'; Lucas 50'; Draxler 61'; Matauidi 72'; Draxler (yellow card) 83'	Stadium: Stade Vélodrome; Attendance: 65,252; Referee: Benoît Bastien

5 March 2017 28	Lorient	1–4	Marseille	Lorient
15:00 CEST (UTC+2)	Touré (yellow card) 5'; Peybernes (yellow card) 47'; Moukandjo 73'	Report	Rolando 6'; Payet 19'; Vainqueur (yellow card) 25'; Thauvin 53'; Sanson 56'	Stadium: Stade du Moustoir; Attendance: 13,757; Referee: Clément Turpin

10 March 2017 29	Marseille	3–0	Angers	Marseille
20:45 CEST (UTC+2)	Thauvin 9', 77'; Cabella 20'; Bedimo (yellow card) 88'	Report		Stadium: Stade Vélodrome; Attendance: 33,954; Referee: Frank Schneider

17 March 2017 30	Lille	0–0	Marseille	Villeneuve d'Ascq
20:45 CEST (UTC+2)	Xeka (yellow card) 49'	Report	Bedimo (yellow card) 26'; Sanson (yellow card) 68'; Payet (yellow card) 87'; Sakai (yellow card) 90+1'	Stadium: Stade Pierre-Mauroy; Attendance: 40,485; Referee: Mikael Lesage

1 April 2017 31	Marseille	1–1	Dijon	Marseille
17:00 CEST (UTC+2)	Gomis (yellow card) 14'; Payet 48'; Rolando (yellow card) 72'	Report	Kwon (yellow card) 16'; Tavares (yellow card) 37'; Sertic 45+1' (o.g.); Abeid (yellow card) 51'; Varrault (yellow card) 67'	Stadium: Stade Vélodrome; Attendance: 36,116; Referee: Johan Hamel

9 April 2017 32	Toulouse	0–0	Marseille	Toulouse
15:00 CEST (UTC+2)	Diop (yellow card) 81'; Moubandje (yellow card) 90+2'	Report	Sakai (yellow card) 41'; Gomis (yellow card) 44'	Stadium: Stadium Municipal; Attendance: 29,430; Referee: Mikael Lesage

16 April 2017 33	Marseille	4–0	Saint-Étienne	Marseille
20:45 CEST (UTC+2)	Thauvin 22', 58'; Gomis 31'; Evra (yellow card) 44'; Payet 90+3'	Report	Hamouma (yellow card) 30'; Pierre-Gabriel (yellow card) 34'	Stadium: Stade Vélodrome; Attendance: 54,100; Referee: Benoît Millot

21 April 2017 34	Nancy	0–0	Marseille	Tomblaine
20:45 CEST (UTC+2)		Report	Payet (yellow card) 81'; Fanni (yellow card) 85'	Stadium: Stade Marcel Picot; Attendance: 20,087; Referee: Nicolas Rainville

30 April 2017 35	Caen	1–5	Marseille	Caen
15:00 CEST (UTC+2)	Santini 9'; Imorou (yellow card) 15'; Rodelin (yellow card) 56'	Report	Thauvin 2', 63', 89'; Lopez 5', 27', (yellow card) 10'; Sakai (yellow card) 17'; Vainqueur (yellow card) 45+1'; Pelé (yellow card) 58'	Stadium: Stade du Moustoir; Attendance: 20,054; Referee: Amaury Delerue

7 May 2017 36	Marseille	2–1	Nice	Marseille
21:00 CEST (UTC+2)	Gomis 21'; Evra 66'	Report	Balotelli 50'	Stadium: Stade Vélodrome; Attendance: 61,685; Referee: Anthony Gautier

14 May 2017 37	Bordeaux	1–1	Marseille	Bordeaux
21:00 CEST (UTC+2)	Rolán 2'; Vada (yellow card) 50'	Report	Hubočan (yellow card) 19'; Evra (yellow card) 33'; Gomis 60'	Stadium: Matmut Atlantique; Attendance: 41,265; Referee: (France) Clément Turpin

20 May 2017 38	Marseille	1–0	Bastia	Marseille
21:00 CEST (UTC+2)	Fanni (yellow card) 55'; Gomis 74'; Vainqueur (yellow card) 77'; N'Jie (yellow card) 78'	Report	Djiku (yellow card) 50'; Danic (yellow card) 77'	Stadium: Stade Vélodrome; Attendance: 55,178; Referee: Frank Schneider

=== Coupe de France ===
8 January 2017 Round of 64	Toulouse	1–2 (a.e.t.)	Marseille	Toulouse
14:30 CET (UTC+1)	Durmaz 57'		Cabella 48', 107'	Stadium: Stadium Municipal

31 January 2017 Round of 32	Marseille	2–1 (a.e.t.)	Lyon	Marseille
21:05 CEST (UTC+1)	Fanni 24'; Dória 109'		Tolisso 64'	Stadium: Stade Vélodrome; Attendance: 53,502; Referee: Amaury Delerue

1 March 2017 Round of 16	Marseille	3–4 (a.e.t.)	Monaco	Marseille
21:05 CEST (UTC+1)	Payet 43', (yellow card) 119'; Vainqueur (yellow card) 61'; Cabella 84', 111'; Dória (yellow card) 115'		Pelé 19' (o.g.); Mbappé 66'; Mendy 104'; Lemar 113'; Fabinho (yellow card) 119'	Stadium: Stade Vélodrome; Attendance: 35,513; Referee: Benoît Millot

=== Coupe de la Ligue ===
26 October 2016 3rd Round	Clermont	1–2	Marseille	Clermont-Ferrand
21:05 CET (UTC+1)	Centonze 52'		Machach 45'; Gomis 69'	Stadium: Stade Gabriel Montpied; Attendance: 10,480; Referee: François Letexier

13 December 2016 Round of 16	Sochaux	1–1 (a.e.t.) (4–3 p)	Marseille	Montbéliard
21:00	Sao 36'		Sarr 22'	Stadium: Stade Auguste Bonal; Attendance: 18,248; Referee: Tony Chapron
	Penalties
	Tardieu (penalty missed); Robinet (penalty scored); Ilaimaharitra (penalty scored); Sao (penalty scored); Karanović (penalty scored)		(penalty scored) Thauvin; (penalty scored) Lopez; (penalty scored) Sarr; (penalty missed) Dória; (penalty missed) Leya

== Statistics ==
=== Goalscorers ===
As of match played 30 April 2017

Place	Position	Nation	Number	Name	Ligue 1	Coupe de France	Coupe de la Ligue	Total
1	FW	(France)	18	Bafétimbi Gomis	20	0	1	21
2	MF	(France)	26	Florian Thauvin	15	0	0	15
3	FW	(France)	7	Rémy Cabella	2	4	0	6
4	FW	(France)	11	Dimitri Payet	4	1	0	5
5	FW	(Cameroon)	14	Clinton N'Jie	4	0	0	4
5	DF	(Portugal)	6	Rolando	4	0	0	4
7	MF	(France)	27	Maxime Lopez	3	0	0	3
8	DF	(Brazil)	3	Dória	1	1	0	2
8	DF	(France)	24	Rod Fanni	1	1	0	2
10	MF	(France)	21	Patrice Evra	1	0	0	1
10	MF	(France)	23	Zinédine Machach	0	0	1	1
10	MF	(France)	8	Morgan Sanson	1	0	0	1
10	MF	(France) (Guinea)	17	Bouna Sarr	0	0	1	1
Own Goals					1	0	0	1
TOTALS					57	7	3	67

=== Clean sheets ===
As of match played 30 April 2017

Place	Position	Nation	Number	Name	Ligue 1	Coupe de France	Coupe de la Ligue	Total
16	GK	(France)	16	Yohann Pelé	18	0	0	18
