= 2015–16 Olympique de Marseille season =

Olympique de Marseille
2015–16 season
- President: Vincent Labrune
- Manager: Marcelo Bielsa (until 8 August 2015); Franck Passi (interim, 8–19 August); Míchel (from 19 August 2015)
- Stadium: Stade Vélodrome
- Ligue 1: 13th
- Coupe de France: Runners-up
- Coupe de la Ligue: Quarter-finals
- UEFA Europa League: Round of 32
- Top goalscorer: League: Michy Batshuayi (17); All: Michy Batshuayi (23)
- Highest home attendance: 61,166 vs Paris Saint-Germain (7 February 2016)
- Lowest home attendance: 9,107 vs Groningen (26 November 2015)
Home colours	Away colours	Third colours

The 2015–16 Olympique de Marseille season is the 66th professional season of the club since its creation in 1899 and 20th consecutive season in the top flight.

== Players ==
French teams are limited to four players without EU citizenship. Hence, the squad list includes only the principal nationality of each player; several non-European players on the squad have dual citizenship with an EU country. Also, players from the ACP countries—countries in Africa, the Caribbean, and the Pacific that are signatories to the Cotonou Agreement—are not counted against non-EU quotas due to the Kolpak ruling.

=== Current squad ===
As of 1 February 2016

Note: Flags indicate national team as defined under FIFA eligibility rules; some limited exceptions apply. Players may hold more than one non-FIFA nationality.

No.	Pos.	Nation	Player
1	GK	FRA	Brice Samba
2	DF	ESP	Javier Manquillo (on loan from Atlético Madrid)
3	DF	CMR	Nicolas Nkoulou
4	DF	NED	Karim Rekik
5	MF	FRA	Abou Diaby
6	DF	POR	Rolando
7	FW	ARG	Lucas Ocampos
8	MF	BRA	Lucas Silva (on loan from Real Madrid)
10	MF	FRA	Lassana Diarra
11	MF	FRA	Romain Alessandrini
13	MF	FRA	Rémy Cabella
14	MF	FRA	Georges-Kévin Nkoudou
15	DF	FRA	Stéphane Sparagna
16	GK	FRA	Yohann Pelé
17	DF	SEN	Bouna Sarr
18	MF	CHI	Mauricio Isla (on loan from Juventus)

No.	Pos.	Nation	Player
19	MF	MAR	Abdelaziz Barrada
20	MF	TOG	Alaixys Romao
21	FW	SCO	Steven Fletcher (on loan from Sunderland)
22	FW	BEL	Michy Batshuayi
23	DF	FRA	Benjamin Mendy
24	FW	FRA	Florian Thauvin (on loan from Newcastle United)
25	DF	ITA	Paolo De Ceglie (on loan from Juventus)
26	DF	CIV	Brice Dja Djédjé
27	MF	FRA	Maxime Lopez
28	FW	FRA	Antoine Rabillard
29	MF	CMR	André-Frank Zambo Anguissa
30	GK	FRA	Steve Mandanda (captain)
32	DF	BRA	Dória
33	FW	FRA	Billel Omrani
38	FW	FRA	Jérémie Porsan-Clemente

=== On loan ===
Note: Flags indicate national team as defined under FIFA eligibility rules; some limited exceptions apply. Players may hold more than one non-FIFA nationality.

No.	Pos.	Nation	Player
—	GK	FRA	Julien Fabri (to Bourg-en-Bresse)
—	DF	FRA	Baptiste Aloé (to Valenciennes)
—	DF	ARM	Gaël Andonian (to Dijon)
—	MF	NZL	Bill Tuiloma (to Strasbourg)
—	FW	TUN	Saber Khalifa (to Club Africain)

== Transfers ==
=== Transfers in ===
Date	Pos.	Player	Age	Moved from	Fee	Notes
18 June 2015	MF	(France) Georges-Kévin Nkoudou	20	(France) Nantes	Undisclosed	
18 June 2015	GK	(France) Yohann Pelé	32	Free	Free transfer	
30 June 2015	FW	(Argentina) Lucas Ocampos	20	(France) Monaco	£4,900,000	
30 June 2015	DF	(Netherlands) Karim Rekik	20	(England) Manchester City	£3,500,000	
3 July 2015	MF	(Guinea) Bouna Sarr	23	(France) Metz	£1,000,000	
24 July 2015	MF	(France) Lassana Diarra	30	Free	Free transfer	
28 July 2015	MF	(France) Abou Diaby	29	Free	Free transfer	
31 July 2015	MF	(Cameroon) André-Frank Zambo Anguissa	19	Free	Free transfer	
28 August 2015	DF	(Norway) Eirik Haugan	18	(Norway) Molde	Undisclosed	
31 August 2015	DF	(Portugal) Rolando	30	(Portugal) Porto	Undisclosed	

=== Loans in ===
Date	Pos.	Player	Age	Loaned from	Return date	Notes
24 July 2015	DF	(Spain) Javier Manquillo	21	(Spain) Atlético Madrid	30 June 2016	
19 August 2015	MF	(France) Rémy Cabella	25	(England) Newcastle United	30 June 2016	
27 August 2015	MF	(Brazil) Lucas Silva	22	(Spain) Real Madrid	30 June 2016	
31 August 2015	MF	(Chile) Mauricio Isla	27	(Italy) Juventus	30 June 2016	
31 August 2015	DF	(Italy) Paolo De Ceglie	28	(Italy) Juventus	30 June 2016	
31 January 2016	MF	(France) Florian Thauvin	23	(England) Newcastle United	30 June 2016	
1 February 2016	FW	(Scotland) Steven Fletcher	28	(England) Sunderland	30 June 2016	

=== Transfers out ===
Date	Pos.	Player	Age	Moved to	Fee	Notes
1 June 2015	DF	(France) Jérémy Morel	31	(France) Lyon	Free transfer	
9 June 2015	MF	(Algeria) Foued Kadir	31	(Spain) Real Betis	Undisclosed	
10 June 2015	FW	(Ghana) André Ayew	25	(England) Swansea City	Free transfer	
20 June 2015	FW	(France) André-Pierre Gignac	29	(Mexico) Tigres UANL	Free transfer	
26 June 2015	MF	(France) Dimitri Payet	28	(England) West Ham United	£10,500,000	
30 June 2015	MF	(Senegal) Momar Bangoura	21	(England) Swindon Town	Free transfer	
30 June 2015	MF	(Gabon) Alexander N'Doumbou	23	Released		
1 July 2015	MF	(France) Giannelli Imbula	22	(Portugal) Porto	£14,200,000	
11 July 2015	DF	(France) Rod Fanni	33	(Qatar) Al-Arabi	Free transfer	
31 July 2015	DF	(France) Laurent Abergel	22	(France) AC Ajaccio	Free transfer	
4 August 2015	FW	(Senegal) Modou Sougou	30	(England) Sheffield Wednesday	Free transfer	
19 August 2015	MF	(France) Florian Thauvin	22	(England) Newcastle United	£12,000,000	

=== Loans out ===
Date	Pos.	Player	Age	Loaned to	Return date	Notes
8 July 2015	FW	(Tunisia) Saber Khalifa	28	(Tunisia) Club Africain	30 June 2016	
9 July 2015	GK	(France) Brice Samba	21	(France) Nancy	30 June 2016	
10 July 2015	GK	(France) Julien Fabri	21	(France) Bourg-en-Bresse	30 June 2016	
28 August 2015	DF	(France) Baptiste Aloé	21	(France) Valenciennes	30 June 2016	
30 August 2015	DF	(New Zealand) Bill Tuiloma	20	(France) Strasbourg	30 June 2016	
31 August 2015	MF	(France) Mario Lemina	21	(Italy) Juventus	30 June 2016	
31 August 2015	DF	(Brazil) Dória	20	(Spain) Granada	30 June 2016	
21 October 2015	DF	(Armenia) Gaël Andonian	20	(France) Dijon	30 June 2016	

== Competitions ==
=== Ligue 1 ===
==== League table ====
Pos	Team	Pld	W	D	L	GF	GA	GD	Pts
11	Bordeaux	38	12	14	12	50	57	−7	50
12	Montpellier	38	14	7	17	49	47	+2	49
13	Marseille	38	10	18	10	48	42	+6	48
14	Nantes	38	12	12	14	33	44	−11	48
15	Lorient	38	11	13	14	47	58	−11	46

Source: Ligue 1, Soccerway
Rules for classification: 1) Points; 2) Goal difference; 3) Goals scored; 4) Head-to-head points; 5) Head-to-head goal difference; 6) Fairplay ranking.

==== Results summary ====
Overall								Home						Away					
Pld	W	D	L	GF	GA	GD	Pts	W	D	L	GF	GA	GD	W	D	L	GF	GA	GD
38	10	18	10	48	42	+6	48	3	11	5	27	24	+3	7	7	5	21	18	+3

Last updated: 22 August 2016.
Source: Competitive matches

==== Results by round ====
Round	1	2	3	4	5	6	7	8	9	10	11	12	13	14	15	16	17	18	19	20	21	22	23	24	25	26	27	28	29	30	31	32	33	34	35	36	37	38
Ground	H	A	H	A	H	H	A	H	A	H	A	A	H	A	H	A	H	H	A	H	A	A	H	A	H	A	H	A	H	A	H	A	H	A	H	A	H	A
Result	L	L	W	L	W	D	D	L	L	D	W	W	L	W	D	W	D	D	D	D	W	D	D	W	L	D	D	D	D	D	L	L	D	L	D	W	W	D
Position	17	19	13	15	11	12	13	15	16	16	14	12	13	12	11	8	9	9	10	11	8	8	10	8	10	11	11	11	11	10	12	13	14	15	16	13	13	13

Source: Ligue1
A = Away; H = Home; W = Win; D = Draw; L = Loss

==== Matches ====
Win Draw Loss

8 August 2015 1	Marseille	0–1	Caen	Marseille
21:00 CEST (UTC+02:00)	Sparagna (yellow card) 82'	Report	Delort 27'	Stadium: Stade Vélodrome; Attendance: 60,458; Referee: Frank Schneider

16 August 2015 2	Reims	1–0	Marseille	Reims
14:00 CEST (UTC+02:00)	Traore 14', (yellow card) 41'; Peuget (yellow card) 44'	Report	Mendy (yellow card) 28'; Romao (yellow card) 49' (yellow-red card) 74'; Batshuayi (yellow card) 58'	Stadium: Stade Auguste Delaune; Attendance: 20,950; Referee: Benoît Bastien

23 August 2015 3	Marseille	6–0	Troyes	Marseille
21:00 CEST (UTC+02:00)	Barrada 19'; Lemina (yellow card) 28'; Diarra 47'; Batshuayi 56', 90'; Ocampos 63'; Alessandrini 88'	Report	Perea (yellow card) 69'	Stadium: Stade Vélodrome; Attendance: 58,356; Referee: Tony Chapron

28 August 2015 4	Guingamp	2–0	Marseille	Guingamp
20:30 CEST (UTC+02:00)	Lemaître (yellow card) 16'; Privat 72'; Benezet 89'	Report	Diarra (yellow card) 2'; Mendy (yellow card) 15'; Alessandrini (yellow card) 61'; Nkoulou (yellow card) 63'; Batshuayi (yellow card) 74'; Sparagna (yellow card) 83'	Stadium: Stade du Roudourou; Attendance: 18,022; Referee: Amaury Delerue

13 September 2015 5	Marseille	4–1	Bastia	Marseille
21:00 CEST (UTC+02:00)	Mendy 15'; Barrada (yellow card) 30'; Rekik (yellow card) 37'; Alessandrini 46', 66'; Batshuayi 70'	Report	Palmieri (yellow card) 34'; Brandão 78'	Stadium: Stade Vélodrome; Attendance: 46,280; Referee: Nicolas Rainville

20 September 2015 6	Marseille	1–1	Lyon	Marseille
21:00 CEST (UTC+02:00)	Cabella (yellow card) 13'; Rekik (yellow card) 21', (goal) 68'; Mandanda (yellow card) 24'; Alessandrini (red card) 44'; Mendy (yellow card) 61'	Report	Lacazette 25' (pen.); Jallet (yellow card) 79'	Stadium: Stade Vélodrome; Attendance: 56,194; Referee: Ruddy Buquet

23 September 2015 7	Toulouse	1–1	Marseille	Toulouse
21:00 CEST (UTC+02:00)	Moubandje (yellow card) 35' (yellow-red card) 84'; Braithwaite 67'; Doumbia (yellow card) 85'; Akpa Akpro (yellow card) 87'; Yago (red card) 87'	Report	Mendy (red card) 78'; Batshuayi 90'	Stadium: Stadium Municipal; Attendance: 18,350; Referee: Antony Gautier

27 September 2015 8	Marseille	1–2	Angers	Marseille
14:00 CEST (UTC+02:00)	Cabella (yellow card) 37'; Nkoulou (yellow card) 69'; Barrada (yellow card) 73'; Batshuayi 79' (pen.)	Report	Saïss (yellow card) 36'; Mangani 38'; Ketkeophomphone (yellow card) 59'; Thomas 70'; Doré (yellow card) 78'	Stadium: Stade Vélodrome; Attendance: 22,596; Referee: Mikael Lesage

4 October 2015 9	Paris Saint-Germain	2–1	Marseille	Paris
21:00 CEST (UTC+02:00)	Ibrahimović 41', 44'; Aurier (yellow card) 55'; Verratti (yellow card) 88'	Report	Batshuayi 30'; Barrada (yellow card) 35'; Mandanda (yellow card) 40'; Diarra (yellow card) 61'	Stadium: Parc des Princes; Attendance: 47,199; Referee: Benoît Bastien

18 October 2015 10	Marseille	1–1	Lorient	Marseille
14:00 CEST (UTC+02:00)	Batshuayi 21' (pen.); Rolando (yellow card) 88'	Report	Bellugou (yellow card) 21'; Moukandjo 37'; Paye (yellow card) 43'; N'Dong (yellow card) 82'	Stadium: Stade Vélodrome; Attendance: 32,232; Referee: Sébastien Moreira

25 October 2015 11	Lille	1–2	Marseille	Villeneuve d'Ascq
17:00 CET (UTC+01:00)	Civelli (yellow card) 18'; Corchia 71', (yellow card) 83'; Guirassy (yellow card) 81'	Report	Batshuayi 37'; Cabella (yellow card) 48'; Nkoulou (yellow card) 52'; Alessandrini 56'; Silva (yellow card) 70'; Diarra (yellow card) 85'	Stadium: Stade Pierre-Mauroy; Attendance: 35,623; Referee: Tony Chapron

1 November 2015 12	Nantes	0–1	Marseille	Nantes
21:00 CET (UTC+01:00)	Bammou (yellow card) 55'; Moimbe (yellow card) 90+1'	Report	Nkoudou 53'; Cabella (yellow card) 90+3'	Stadium: Stade de la Beaujoire; Attendance: 27,392; Referee: Lionel Jaffredo

8 November 2015 13	Marseille	0–1	Nice	Marseille
17:00 CET (UTC+01:00)	Mendy (yellow card) 86'; Sparagna (yellow card) 87'	Report	Germain 16'; Wallyson (yellow card) 20'; Pereira (yellow card) 68'	Stadium: Stade Vélodrome; Attendance: 47,988; Referee: Antony Gautier

22 November 2015 14	Saint-Étienne	0–2	Marseille	Saint-Étienne
21:00 CET (UTC+01:00)	Hamouma (yellow card) 74'	Report	Batshuayi 41'; Nkoudou 51'; Nkoulou (yellow card) 74'	Stadium: Stade Geoffroy-Guichard; Attendance: 34,681; Referee: Fredy Fautrel

29 November 2015 15	Marseille	3–3	Monaco	Marseille
21:00 CET (UTC+01:00)	Alessandrini 12'; Batshuayi 51'; Mendy (yellow card) 74'; Nkoudou 82'	Report	A.Touré 18', 39', (yellow card) 70'; Costa (yellow card) 33'; Coentrão 72'; Elderson (yellow card) 90+4'	Stadium: Stade Vélodrome; Attendance: 42,882; Referee: Clément Turpin

3 December 2015 16	Rennes	0–1	Marseille	Rennes
21:00 CET (UTC+01:00)	Moreira (yellow card) 1'; André (yellow card) 51'; Mexer (yellow card) 55'; Armand (yellow card) 88'	Report	Cabella 21', (yellow card) 25'; Mandanda (yellow card) 90'	Stadium: Roazhon Park; Attendance: 23,424; Referee: Tony Chapron

6 December 2015 17	Marseille	2–2	Montpellier	Marseille
14:00 CET (UTC+01:00)	Romao (yellow card) 36'; Batshuayi (yellow card) 40'; Cabella 48'; Sarr 72'	Report	Ninga 32', 56', (yellow card) 48'	Stadium: Stade Vélodrome; Attendance: 41,486; Referee: Bartolomeu Varela

13 December 2015 18	Marseille	1–1	Gazélec Ajaccio	Marseille
17:00 CET (UTC+01:00)	Cabella (yellow card) 33'; Batshuayi 38'; Barrada (red card) 51'; Romao (yellow card) 90+2'	Report	Zoua 19' (pen.); Ducourtioux (yellow card) 32'; Mangane (yellow card) 41'; Youga (yellow card) 64'; Coeff (yellow card) 90+1'	Stadium: Stade Vélodrome; Attendance: 40,298; Referee: Nicolas Rainville

20 December 2015 19	Bordeaux	1–1	Marseille	Bordeaux
21:00 CET (UTC+01:00)	Khazri 57', (yellow card) 90+1'; Contento (yellow card) 90+3'; Poko	Report	Nkoulou (yellow card) 12'; Romao 56', (yellow card) 90+1'; Barrada (yellow card) 62'	Stadium: Nouveau Stade de Bordeaux; Attendance: 39,672; Referee: Benoît Bastien

10 January 2016 20	Marseille	0–0	Guingamp	Marseille
21:00 CET (UTC+01:00)	Rolando (yellow card) 59'; Batshuayi (yellow card) 61'	Report	Martins Pereira (yellow card) 80'	Stadium: Stade Vélodrome; Attendance: 38,948; Referee: Fredy Fautrel

17 January 2016 21	SM Caen	1–3	Marseille	Caen
17:00 CET (UTC+01:00)	Imorou (yellow card) 14'; Bazile (yellow card) 44'; Rodelin 67'	Report	Batshuayi 12'; Dja Djédjé (yellow card) 57'; Nkoudou 60'; Sarr 83'	Stadium: Stade Michel d'Ornano; Attendance: 20,513; Referee: Amaury Delerue

24 January 2016 22	Lyon	1–1	Marseille	Lyon
21:00 CET (UTC+01:00)	Morel (yellow card) 52'; Tolisso 78'; Yanga-Mbiwa (yellow card) 87'	Report	Batshuayi (yellow card) 53'; Cabella 64'; Manquillo (yellow card) 78'	Stadium: Parc Olympique Lyonnais; Attendance: 56,506; Referee: Antony Gautier

29 January 2016 23	Marseille	1–1	Lille	Marseille
20:30 CET (UTC+01:00)	Nkoulou (yellow card) 49'; Barrada (red card) 83'; Rabillard 90+6'	Report	Corchia 57'; Amalfitano (yellow card) 90+5'	Stadium: Stade Vélodrome; Attendance: 40,187; Referee: Benoît Bastien

2 February 2016 24	Montpellier	0–1	Marseille	Montpellier
21:00 CET (UTC+01:00)	Martin (yellow card) 51'; Saihi (yellow card) 83'	Report	Rabillard (yellow card) 30'; Nkoudou 68'; Thauvin (red card) 69'; Cabella (yellow card) 86'; De Ceglie (yellow card) 90+4'	Stadium: Stade de la Mosson; Attendance: 16,756; Referee: Tony Chapron

7 February 2016 25	Marseille	1–2	Paris Saint-Germain	Marseille
21:00 CET (UTC+01:00)	Cabella 25'	Report	Ibrahimović 2'; Di María 77'; Motta (yellow card) 88'	Stadium: Stade Vélodrome; Attendance: 61,166; Referee: Ruddy Buquet

14 February 2016 26	Nice	1–1	Marseille	Nice
21:00 CET (UTC+01:00)	Germain 58'; Ricardo (yellow card) 86'	Report	Isla 28', (yellow card) 45+7'; Nkoulou (yellow card) 90+1'	Stadium: Allianz Riviera; Attendance: 28,659; Referee: Benoît Millot

21 February 2016 27	Marseille	1–1	Saint-Étienne	Marseille
14:00 CET (UTC+01:00)	Nkoulou (red card) 60'; Batshuayi 90+4'	Report	Sall (yellow card) 9'; Monnet-Paquet 85'	Stadium: Stade Vélodrome; Attendance: 50,570; Referee: Clément Turpin

6 March 2016 29	Marseille	1–1	Toulouse	Marseille
14:00 CET (UTC+01:00)	Rekik (yellow card) 28'; Rolando (yellow card) 59'; Steven Fletcher 74'	Report	Blin (yellow card) 36'; Ben Yedder 55'	Stadium: Stade Vélodrome; Attendance: 41,080; Referee: Benoît Millot

9 March 2016 28	Gazélec Ajaccio	1–1	Marseille	Ajaccio, Corsica
18:30 CET (UTC+01:00)	Lemoigne (yellow card) 31'; Sylla (yellow card) 70'; Rekik 84' (o.g.)	Report	Romao (yellow card) 38'; Cabella (yellow card) 64', (goal) 79'	Stadium: Stade Ange Casanova; Attendance: 4,103; Referee: Stéphane Lannoy

12 March 2016 30	Lorient	1–1	Marseille	Lorient
17:00 CET (UTC+1)	Waris 34'; Gassama (yellow card) 82'	Report	Isla 46'; Silva (yellow card) 67'; Cabella (yellow card) 68'	Stadium: Stade du Moustoir; Attendance: 15,599; Referee: Ruddy Buquet

18 March 2016 31	Marseille	2–5	Rennes	Marseille
20:30 CET (UTC+01:00)	Rolando (yellow card) 8', (goal) 50'; Thauvin 20'; Batshuayi (yellow card) 32'	Report	Gourcuff 4', 59'; Diagné 9'; Dembélé 14'; André (yellow card) 29'; Sio 77'	Stadium: Stade Vélodrome; Attendance: 40,077; Referee: Sébastien Moreira

3 April 2016 32	Bastia	2–1	Marseille	Bastia
20:00 CET (UTC+01:00)	Mostefa (yellow card) 4'; Palmieri (yellow card) 32'; Reik 47' (o.g.); Danic 56'; Djiku (yellow card) 87'	Report	Diarra (yellow card) 22'; Mandanda (yellow card) 55'; Batshuayi 77'; Alessandrini (red card) 85'	Stadium: Stade Armand Cesari; Attendance: 13,141; Referee: Lionel Jaffredo

9 April 2016 33	Marseille	0–0	Bordeaux	Marseille
21:00 CEST (UTC+02:00)	Reik (yellow card) 23'; Nkoulou (yellow card) 59'; Batshuayi (yellow card) 78'	Report	Touré (yellow card) 19'; Pablo (yellow card) 28'	Stadium: Stade Vélodrome; Attendance: 43,344; Referee: Frank Schneider

16 April 2016 34	Monaco	2–1	Marseille	Monaco
21:00 CEST (UTC+02:00)	Silva 47'; Raggi 75', (yellow card) 76'	Report	Batshuayi 90+3'	Stadium: Stade Louis II; Attendance: 10,056; Referee: Antony Gautier

24 April 2016 35	Marseille	1–1	Nantes	Marseille
17:00 CEST (UTC+02:00)	Thauvin 49'; Romao (red card) 56'; Mendy (yellow card) 90'	Report	Nkoulou 31' (o.g.); Thomasson (yellow card) 44'; Bammou (yellow card) 79'; Vizcarrondo (yellow card) 81'	Stadium: Stade Vélodrome; Attendance: 19,898; Referee: Stéphane Lannoy

30 April 2016 36	Angers	0–1	Marseille	Angers
17:00 CEST (UTC+02:00)	Mangani (yellow card) 13'; Thomas (yellow card) 71'	Report	Mendy (yellow card) 21'; Batshuayi 24', (yellow card) 88'; Fletcher (yellow card) 52'; Manquillo (yellow card) 90+2'	Stadium: Stade Jean-Bouin; Attendance: 16,198; Referee: Tony Chapron

7 May 2016 37	Marseille	1–0	Reims	Marseille
21:00 CEST (UTC+02:00)	Batshuayi 56'; Barrada (yellow card) 68'; Mandanda (yellow card) 88'	Report	Devaux (yellow card) 71'	Stadium: Stade Vélodrome; Attendance: 20,767; Referee: Nicolas Rainville

14 May 2016 38	Troyes	1–1	Marseille	Troyes
21:00 CEST (UTC+02:00)	Camus 10'; Thiago Xavier (yellow card) 30'; Martial (yellow card) 81'	Report	Dja Djédjé (yellow card) 23'; Fletcher 61'	Stadium: Stade de l'Aube; Attendance: 16,623; Referee: François Lexetier

=== Coupe de France ===
3 January 2016 Round of 64	Caen	0–0 (a.e.t.) (1–3 p)	Marseille	Caen
20:45 CET (UTC+01:00)	Adeoti (yellow card) 90'	Report	N'Koulou (yellow card) 44'; Rekik (red card) 62'	Stadium: Stade Michel d'Ornano; Attendance: 15,887; Referee: Jérôme Miguelgorry
	Penalties
	Féret (penalty missed); Ben Youssef (penalty missed); Yahia (penalty scored); Bessat (penalty missed)		Diarra (penalty scored); Rolando (penalty scored); Batshuayi (penalty scored)

20 January 2016 Round of 32	Marseille	2–0	Montpellier	Marseille
20:00 CET (UTC+01:00)	Sarr (yellow card) 32'; Cabella (yellow card) 37'; Bensebaini 41' (o.g.); Dja Djédjé 55', (yellow card) 58'	Report		Stadium: Stade Vélodrome; Attendance: 37,078; Referee: Lionel Jaffredo

11 February 2016 Round of 16	Trélissac	0–2	Marseille	Trélissac
21:00 CET (UTC+01:00)	Sophie (yellow card) 17'	Report	Alessandrini 33'; Fletcher 86'	Stadium: Stade Firmin Daudou; Attendance: 16,604; Referee: Mikael Lesage

3 March 2016 Quarter-final	Granville	0–1	Marseille	Caen
CET (UTC+01:00)	Peron (yellow card) 90'; Vauvy (yellow card) 90'	Report	Batshuayi 50'; Barrada (yellow card) 83'	Stadium: Stade Michel d'Ornano; Attendance: 21,000; Referee: Frank Schneider

20 April 2016 Semi-final	Sochaux	0–1	Marseille	Montbéliard
21:00 CEST (UTC+02:00)	Sao (yellow card) 14'; Tardieu (yellow card) 85'	Report	Mendy (yellow card) 41'; Rolando (yellow card) 46'; Thauvin 49'; Barrada (yellow card) 65'	Stadium: Stade Auguste Bonal; Attendance: 19,964; Referee: Auguste Bonal

21 May 2016 Final	Paris Saint-Germain	4–2	Marseille	Saint-Denis
21:00 CEST (UTC+02:00)	Matuidi 3'; Ibrahimović 47' (pen.), 82'; Cavani 57'	Report	Thauvin 12'; Mendy (yellow card) 33'; Batshuayi 87'	Stadium: Stade de France; Attendance: 80,000; Referee: Clément Turpin

=== Coupe de la Ligue ===
16 December 2015 Round of 16	Bourg-en-Bresse 01	2–3	Marseille	Péronnas
18:45 CET (UTC+01:00)	Boussaha (yellow card) 16', (goal) 27', 90+3'; Perradin (yellow card) 22'	Report	Sarr 13'; Sparagna (yellow card) 19'; Ocampos 50'; Romao (yellow card) 73'; Cabella 75'	Stadium: Stade Municipal de Péronnas; Attendance: 6,405; Referee: Stéphane Jochem

13 January 2016 Quarter-finals	Toulouse	2–1 (a.e.t.)	Marseille	Toulouse
17:00 CET (UTC+01:00)	Ben Yedder 25'; Diop (yellow card) 94'; Braithwaite 99'	Report	Nkoudou 27'; Rolando (yellow card) 78'; Sparagna (yellow card) 87'	Stadium: Stadium Municipal; Attendance: 18,163; Referee: Benoît Millot

=== UEFA Europa League ===
==== Group stage ====
Pos	Team	Pld	W	D	L	GF	GA	GD	Pts	Qualification	BRA	MAR	LIB	GRO
1	(Portugal) Braga	6	4	1	1	7	4	+3	13	Advance to knockout phase	—	3–2	2–1	1–0
2	(France) Marseille	6	4	0	2	12	7	+5	12	Advance to knockout phase	1–0	—	0–1	2–1
3	(Czech Republic) Slovan Liberec	6	2	1	3	6	8	−2	7		0–1	2–4	—	1–1
4	(Netherlands) Groningen	6	0	2	4	2	8	−6	2		0–0	0–3	0–1	—

Source: Soccerway
Rules for classification: Group stage tiebreakers

17 September 2015 1	Groningen (Netherlands)	0–3	(France) Marseille	Groningen, Netherlands
19:00 CEST	De Leeuw (yellow card) 56'; Tibbling (yellow card) 90+1'	Report	Mendy (yellow card) 23'; Nkoudou 25'; Ocampos 40', (yellow card) 51'; Alessandrini 61'	Stadium: Euroborg; Attendance: 21,520; Referee: Yevhen Aranovsky (Ukraine)

1 October 2015 2	Marseille (France)	0–1	(Czech Republic) Slovan Liberec	Marseille, France
21:05 CEST	Rekik (yellow card) 37'; Ocampos (yellow card) 61'	Report	Pokorný (yellow card) 47'; Coufal 84'; Bartošák (yellow card) 90+2'; Koubek (yellow card) 90+6'	Stadium: Stade Vélodrome; Attendance: 10,040; Referee: Aleksei Eskov (Russia)

22 October 2015 3	Braga (Portugal)	3–2	(France) Marseille	Braga, Portugal
21:05 CEST	Hassan 61'; Marcelo Goiano (yellow card) 70'; Eduardo 77'; Djavan (yellow card) 83'; Alan 88'; Ferreira (yellow card) 90+4'	Report	Sparagna (yellow card) 27'; Barrada (yellow card) 56'; Cabella (yellow card) 70'; Alessandrini 84'; Batshuayi 87'	Stadium: Estádio Municipal de Braga; Attendance: 9,000; Referee: Alexandru Tudor (Romania)

5 November 2015 4	Marseille (France)	1–0	(Portugal) Braga	Marseille, France
19:00 CET	Nkoudou 39'; Rekik (yellow card) 87'; Cabella (yellow card) 89'; Barrada (yellow card) 90'	Report	Marcelo Goiano (yellow card) 45'; Ferreira (yellow card) 70'; Luíz Carlos (yellow card) 72'	Stadium: Stade Vélodrome; Attendance: 13,000; Referee: Hüseyin Göçek (Turkey)

26 November 2015 5	Marseille (France)	2–1	(Netherlands) Groningen	Marseille, France
21:05 CET	Nkoudou 28'; Batshuayi 88'	Report	Maduro 50'; Hateboer (yellow card) 89'	Stadium: Stade Vélodrome; Attendance: 9,107; Referee: Andris Treimanis (Latvia)

10 December 2015 6	Slovan Liberec (Czech Republic)	2–4	(France) Marseille	Liberec, Czech Republic
19:00 CET	Bakoš (yellow card) 26', (goal) 75' (pen.); Pavelka (yellow card) 35'; Šural 76'; Efremov (yellow card) 81'; Bartošák (yellow card) 85'	Report	Batshuayi 14', (yellow card) 29'; Mandanda (yellow card) 26'; Cabella (yellow card) 28'; Nkoudou 43'; Barrada 48'; Nkoulou (yellow card) 74'; Ocampos 90+4'	Stadium: Stadion u Nisy; Attendance: 9,900; Referee: Robert Schörgenhofer (Austria)

==== Knockout phase ====
===== Round of 32 =====
18 February 2016 First leg	Marseille (France)	0–1	(Spain) Athletic Bilbao	Marseille, France
21:05 CET (UTC+01:00)	Diarra (yellow card) 76'; Isla (yellow card) 89'	Report	Aduriz 54'; Beñat (yellow card) 60'; Balenziaga (yellow card) 82'; Elustondo (yellow card) 90+2'	Stadium: Vélodrome; Attendance: 29,727; Referee: Craig Thomson (Scotland)

25 February 2016 Second leg	Athletic Bilbao (Spain)	1–1 (2–1 agg.)	(France) Marseille	Bilbao, Spain
19:00 CET (UTC+01:00)	San José (yellow card) 38'; Aduriz (yellow card) 53'; Merino 81'	Report	Nkoulou (yellow card) 34'; Mendy (yellow card) 38'; Batshuayi 40'; Nkoudou (yellow card) 75'; Diarra (yellow card) 90+3'	Stadium: San Mamés; Attendance: 38,259; Referee: Aleksei Kulbakov (Belarus)

== Statistics ==
=== Goalscorers ===
As of match played 6 June 2016

Ran	No.	Pos	Nat	Name	Ligue 1	Coupe de France	Coupe de la Ligue	UEFA Europa League	Total
1	22	MF	(Belgium)	Michy Batshuayi	17	2	0	4	23
2	14	FW	(France)	Georges-Kévin Nkoudou	5	0	1	4	10
3	11	MF	(France)	Romain Alessandrini	5	1	0	2	8
4	13	MF	(France)	Rémy Cabella	5	0	1	0	6
5	7	MF	(Argentina)	Lucas Ocampos	1	0	1	2	4
5	24	FW	(France)	Florian Thauvin	2	2	0	0	4
6	17	MF	(Guinea)	Bouna Sarr	2	0	1	0	3
6	9	FW	(Scotland)	Steven Fletcher	2	1	0	0	3
7	19	MF	(Morocco)	Abdelaziz Barrada	1	0	0	1	2
7	18	MF	(Chile)	Mauricio Isla	2	0	0	0	2
8	23	DF	(France)	Benjamin Mendy	1	0	0	0	1
8	4	DF	(Netherlands)	Karim Rekik	1	0	0	0	1
8	20	MF	(Togo)	Alaixys Romao	1	0	0	0	1
8	10	MF	(France)	Lassana Diarra	1	0	0	0	1
8	28	FW	(France)	Antoine Rabillard	1	0	0	0	1
8	6	DF	(Portugal)	Rolando	1	0	0	0	1
8	26	DF	(Ivory Coast)	Brice Dja Djédjé	0	1	0	0	1
				Own goals	0	1	0	0	1
Total					48	8	4	13	73
