= FCO Saint-Jean-de-la-Ruelle =

French football club

Saint-Jean-de-la-Ruelle
- Full name: Football Club Olympique de Saint-Jean-de-la-Ruelle
- Founded: 1968; 58 years ago
- Ground: Stade des Trois Fontaines, Saint-Jean-de-la-Ruelle
- Chairman: José Torrecilla
- Manager: Brahim Belgour
- League: Division d'Honneur de Centre
- 2008–09: DH Centre, 8th
Home colours

Football Club Olympique de Saint-Jean-de-la-Ruelle is a French association football club founded in 1968. They are based in the town of Saint-Jean-de-la-Ruelle, and their home stadium is the Stade des Trois Fontaines. As of the 2009–10 season, the club plays in the Division d'Honneur de Centre, the sixth tier of French football.

== Notable players ==
- (France) Florian Thauvin (youth)
