= Rémy Cabella =

French footballer (born 1990)

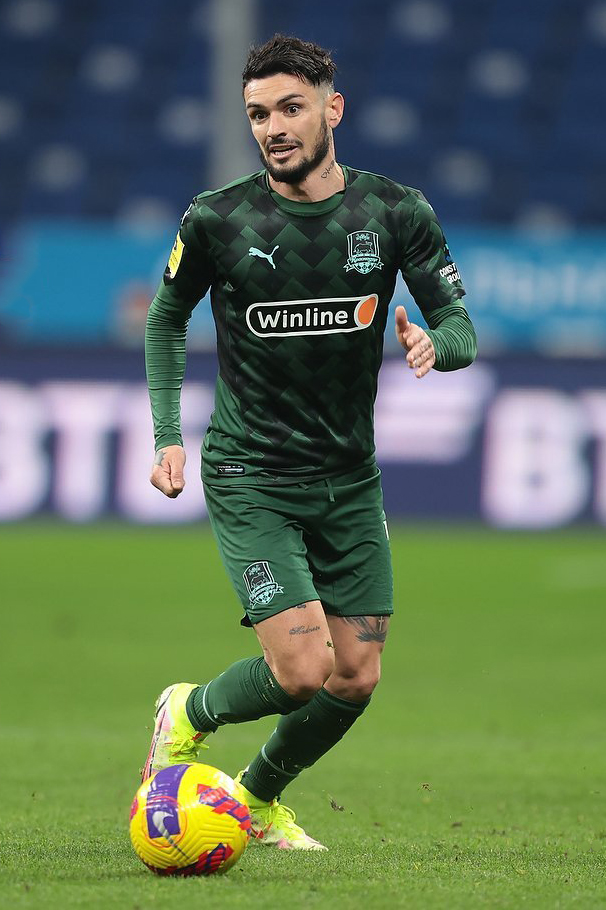
- Cabella with Krasnodar in 2021

Personal information
- Full name: Rémy Joseph Cabella
- Date of birth: 8 March 1990 (age 36)
- Place of birth: Ajaccio, France
- Height: 1.71 m (5 ft 7 in)
- Position: Attacking midfielder

Team information
- Current team: Volos
- Number: 5

Youth career
- 1993–1995: AC Ajaccio
- 1995–1998: Gazélec Ajaccio
- 1998–2000: Afa FA
- 2000–2004: Gazélec Ajaccio
- 2004–2010: Montpellier

Senior career*
Years	Team	Apps	(Gls)
2009–2014	Montpellier	97	(24)
2010–2011	→ Arles-Avignon (loan)	17	(3)
2014–2016	Newcastle United	31	(1)
2015–2016	→ Marseille (loan)	34	(5)
2016–2018	Marseille	32	(3)
2017–2018	→ Saint-Étienne (loan)	26	(7)
2018–2019	Saint-Étienne	34	(8)
2019–2022	Krasnodar	49	(14)
2022	Montpellier	5	(0)
2022–2025	Lille	85	(10)
2025–2026	Olympiacos	7	(0)
2026	→ Nantes (loan)	11	(2)
2026–	Volos	0	(0)

International career^{‡}
2011–2012	France U21	17	(4)
2011–	Corsica	6	(1)
2014	France	4	(0)
- * Club domestic league appearances and goals as of 2 May 2026 ‡ National team caps and goals as of 25 May 2024

Rémy Joseph Cabella (born 8 March 1990) is a French professional footballer who plays as an attacking midfielder for Super League Greece club Volos.

He had two spells each at Montpellier and Saint-Étienne, winning the Ligue 1 title with the former in 2011–12. He also represented Arles-Avignon, Marseille and Lille in the top flight, making over 200 total appearances and scoring over 50 goals. He also played for Newcastle United in the Premier League and Krasnodar in the Russian Premier League.

Cabella earned four caps for France in 2014, and was chosen for the year's World Cup.

== Early life ==
Rémy Joseph Cabella was born on 8 March 1990 in Ajaccio, Corsica, to an Italian father and a Corsican mother. He started his youth career at local clubs AC Ajaccio and Gazélec Ajaccio, before joining Montpellier's academy at the age of 14, winning the 2009 Coupe Gambardella with their under-19 team.

== Club career ==
=== Montpellier ===
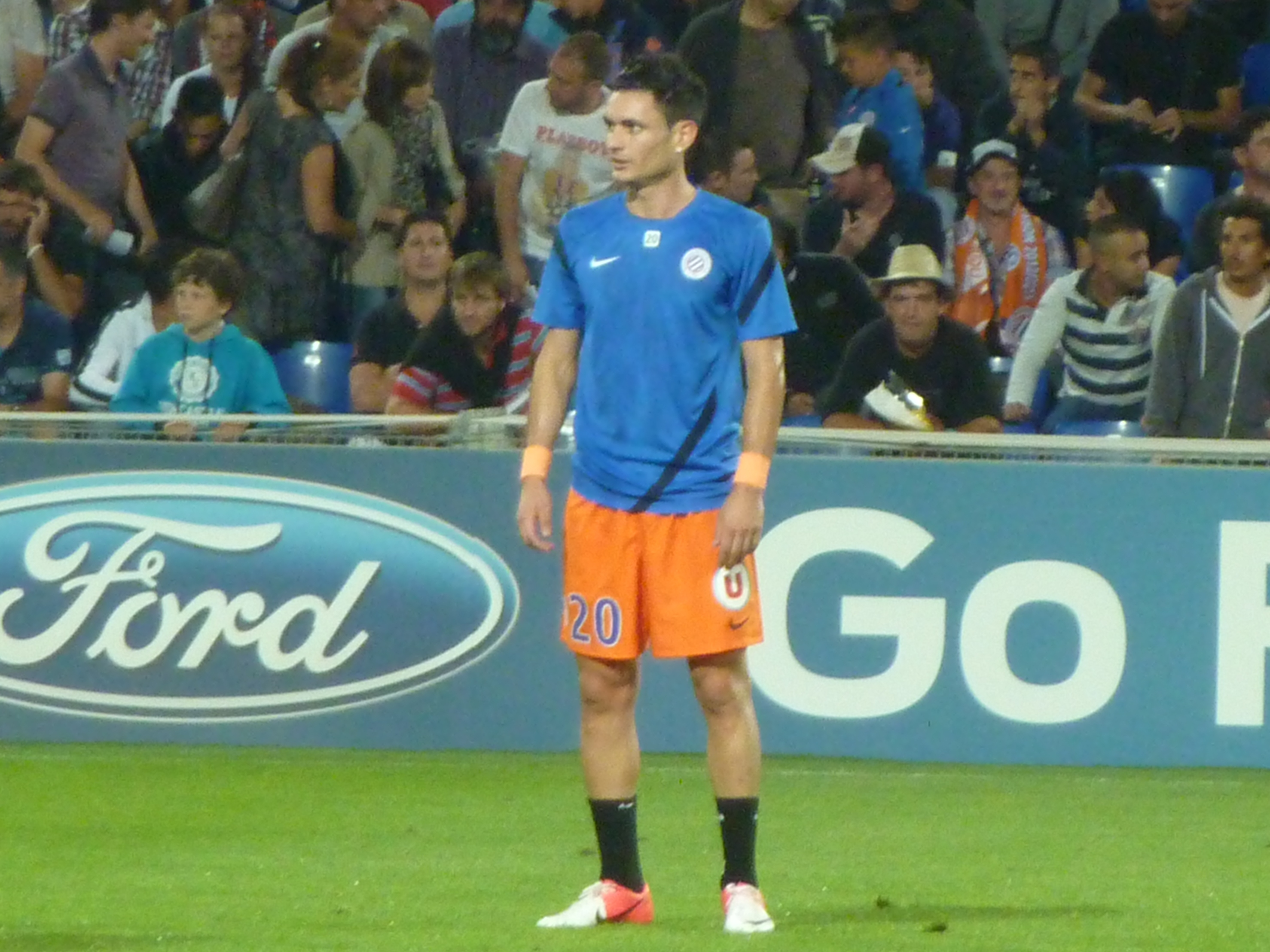
Cabella playing for Montpellier in 2012

Cabella signed a three-year professional contract with Montpellier in July 2009. He injured the cruciate ligament in his right knee during training in September and was ruled out for the season.

He was sent on loan to Arles-Avignon for the 2010–11 Ligue 1 season, where he scored three goals in 17 league appearances.

Cabella signed a two-year extension to his contract in January 2012, which would keep him at the club til 2016. In a 1–0 win over Brest on 4 February 2012, Cabella struck a volley from a cross that struck the back of his teammate Geoffrey Dernis and went into the opposition's net for a goal. Cabella was credited with the assist. On 11 February 2012, in a 3–0 victory over AC Ajaccio, Cabella scored with a right-footed shot across Ajaccio's goalkeeper after being put away by Olivier Giroud. On 20 May 2012, Montpellier won the league title for the first time in its history.

In May 2014, Cabella announced his intention to leave the club in the summer.

=== Newcastle United ===
On 13 July 2014, Cabella signed for Premier League club Newcastle United on a six-year contract, for a reported £8 million transfer fee. He made his competitive debut on 17 August as Newcastle began the season with a 2–0 defeat at home to Manchester City, playing the full 90 minutes. Cabella's only Newcastle goal came on 31 January 2015, opening a 3–0 win away at Hull City. He was subsequently awarded Player of the Month for January by Newcastle fans. During his time with Newcastle, Cabella made 34 appearances in all competitions, scoring just one goal.

=== Marseille ===
On 19 August 2015, Cabella returned to France, signing with Ligue 1 side Marseille on a season-long loan as part of a deal that saw Florian Thauvin transfer to Newcastle. He made his club debut on four days later, starting in the 6–0 Ligue 1 home victory over Troyes. he scored his first goal for Marseille on 3 December in a 1–0 win over Rennes, and another goal three days later in a 2–2 draw with his former team Montpellier.

Although Cabella's loan spell at Marseille had ended, he spent the pre-season with the French club, appearing in some friendly matches. On 11 August 2016, Newcastle announced that Cabella's loan switch to Marseille had become permanent ahead of the 2016–17 season. On 1 March 2017, he scored two goals to level the score twice (to 2–2 and 3–3) in a 4–3 extra-time home loss to Monaco in a 2016–17 Coupe de France round of 16 match.

=== Saint-Étienne ===
On 31 August 2017, Cabella joined Saint-Étienne on a season-long loan. He made his debut ten days later, scoring in the first minute of a 1–1 home draw with Angers.

On 16 August 2018, Cabella joined Saint-Étienne permanently on a four-year contract. The following 5 May, he scored a goal and provided two assists in the 3–2 away win over Monaco, reaching 50 Ligue 1 goals.

=== Krasnodar ===
==== 2019–20 season ====
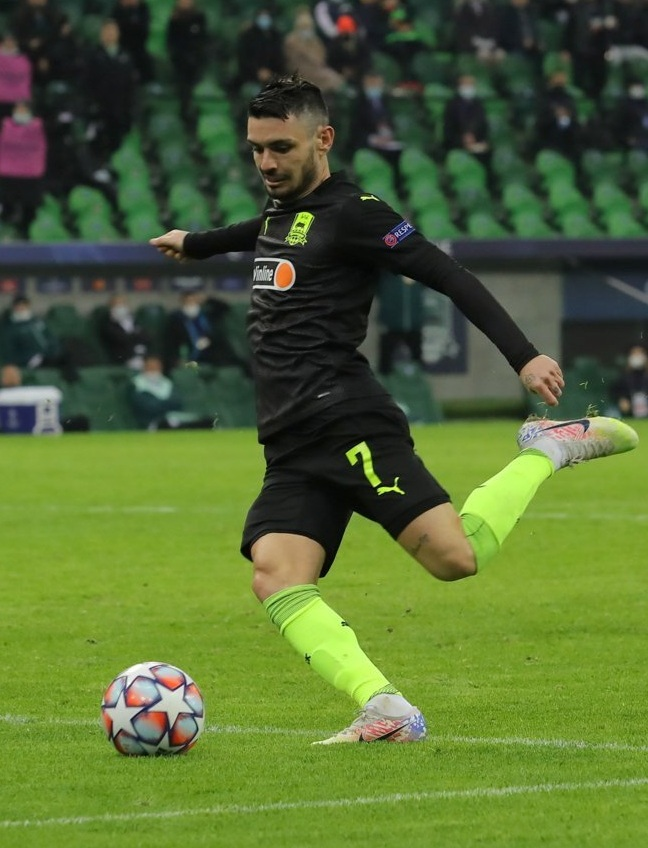
Cabella playing for FC Krasnodar in 2020

On 25 July 2019, Cabella joined Russian club FC Krasnodar for a fee of €12 million. He made his debut on 3 August in a 1–1 draw at FC Zenit St Peterburg, being substituted for Magomed-Shapi Suleymanov after 58 minutes. On 21 August 2019, in the first leg Champions League qualifier against Olympiacos, he suffered an ACL rupture.

Cabella missed almost a year during recovery, making his return appearance for Krasnodar on 1 July 2020 in a match against FC Rostov. The 2019–20 Russian Premier League season had been extended due to the COVID-19 pandemic in Russia.

==== 2020–21 season ====
Cabella scored twice in Krasnodar's first league game of the season, a 3–0 victory at FC Ufa on 9 August 2020.

In September, Cabella scored in each leg of Krasnodar's play-off round 4–2 aggregate win against PAOK for qualification to the group stage of the UEFA Champions League. It was the first time ever that the club had qualified for the group stage of Europe's premier knock-out competition. Cabella missed the first group stage match of the competition away to Rennes on 20 October as he was forced to self-isolate following a positive COVID-19 test. He scored his side's goal in their 1–1 draw away to group winners Chelsea in the final match of the group stage, having already been parachuted to the Europa League Round of 32.

==== 2021–22 season ====
On 3 March 2022, following the Russian invasion of Ukraine, Krasnodar announced that Cabella's contract was suspended and he will not train with the team, but it was not terminated and remained valid. Six days later, it was terminated by mutual consent.

=== Return to France ===
On 6 April 2022, Cabella returned to Montpellier until the end of the season.

On 10 July 2022, Lille announced his arrival on a free transfer, on a one-year contract, with an option to extend for another year.

=== Olympiacos ===
On 20 May 2025, Greek club Olympiacos announced the signing of Cabella on a free transfer on the expiration of his contract with Lille.

==== Nantes (loan) ====
On 1 January 2026, Cabella returned to France, joining Ligue 1 club Nantes until the end of the season. Three days later, he converted a penalty on his debut in a 2–0 away win over his former club Marseille.

=== Volos ===
On 14 September 2026, Cabella signed for Super League Greece club Volos.

== International career ==
=== France U21 ===
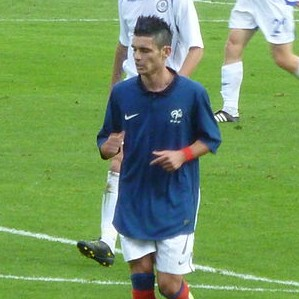
Cabella playing for France U21 in 2011

Between 2010 and 2012, Cabella played seventeen times for the France national under-21 football team, scoring four goals.

=== Corsica ===
As well as the French national side, Cabella also qualified for the non-FIFA affiliated team of Corsica. He made his début for the team in 2011 against Bulgaria. He was again called up to the Squadra Corsa in 2016, while at Marseille, to face the Basque Country. He started the match, playing the full 90 minutes. On 2 June 2019, he equalised in a 1–1 draw away to neighbours Sardinia.

=== France ===
Cabella was named on the stand-by list for France's 2014 FIFA World Cup squad. He made his international debut coming on as an 80th-minute substitute for Yohan Cabaye in a 4–0 friendly match win over Norway on 28 May 2014 at the Stade de France. On 6 June, Cabella replaced the injured Franck Ribéry in France's 2014 World Cup squad. The team lost to Germany in the quarter-finals on 4 July, and Cabella did not enter the field of play in all of their five matches in that tournament.

After signing for Newcastle, Cabella picked up three more caps for France in September and October 2014, in friendly matches against Spain, Serbia, and Armenia.

== Style of play ==
A profile of Cabella by Simon Osborn of Metro in 2013 described him as a "fast, agile and creative midfielder who can play on the wing or behind a striker".

== Career statistics ==
=== Club ===
As of match played 2 May 2026

Appearances and goals by club, season and competition
Club	Season	League			National cup (Note: Includes Coupe de France, FA Cup, Russian Cup, Greek Football Cup)		League cup (Note: Includes Coupe de la Ligue, Football League Cup)		Europe		Other		Total	
Club	Season	Division	Apps	Goals	Apps	Goals	Apps	Goals	Apps	Goals	Apps	Goals	Apps	Goals
Arles-Avignon (loan)	2010–11	Ligue 1	17	3	1	0	0	0	—		—		18	3
Montpellier	2011–12	Ligue 1	29	3	4	3	1	0	—		—		34	6
Montpellier	2012–13	Ligue 1	31	7	1	0	2	1	6 (Note: Appearances in UEFA Champions League)	0	1 (Note: Appearance in Trophée des Champions)	0	41	8
Montpellier	2013–14	Ligue 1	37	14	3	0	1	0	—		—		41	14
Montpellier	Total		97	24	8	3	4	1	6	0	1	0	116	28
Newcastle United	2014–15	Premier League	31	1	1	0	2	0	—		—		34	1
Marseille (loan)	2015–16	Ligue 1	34	5	4	0	1	1	6 (Note: Appearance(s) in UEFA Europa League)	0	—		45	6
Marseille	2016–17	Ligue 1	29	2	3	4	0	0	—		—		32	6
Marseille	2017–18	Ligue 1	3	1	0	0	0	0	1	0	—		4	1
Marseille	Total		66	8	7	4	1	1	7	0	—		81	13
Saint-Étienne (loan)	2017–18	Ligue 1	26	7	1	0	1	0	—		—		28	7
Saint-Étienne	2018–19	Ligue 1	34	8	2	2	1	0	—		—		37	10
Saint-Étienne	Total		60	15	3	2	2	0	—		—		65	17
Krasnodar	2019–20	Russian Premier League	9	2	0	0	—		3	0	—		12	2
Krasnodar	2020–21	Russian Premier League	24	8	1	0	—		7 (Note: Five appearances and three goals in UEFA Champions League, two appearances in UEFA Europa League)	3	—		32	11
Krasnodar	2021–22	Russian Premier League	16	4	2	0	—		—		—		18	4
Krasnodar	Total		49	14	3	0	—		10	3	—		62	17
Montpellier	2021–22	Ligue 1	5	0	—		—		—		—		5	0
Lille	2022–23	Ligue 1	32	7	3	0	—		—		—		35	7
Lille	2023–24	Ligue 1	30	2	0	0	—		11 (Note: Appearances in UEFA Europa Conference League)	2	—		41	4
Lille	2024–25	Ligue 1	23	1	3	0	—		11	1	—		37	2
Lille	Total		85	10	6	0	—		22	3	—		113	13
Olympiacos	2025–26	Super League Greece	7	0	3	0	—		0	0	—		10	0
Nantes (loan)	2025–26	Ligue 1	11	2	1	0	—		—		—		12	2
Career total			428	77	33	9	7	2	45	6	1	0	514	94

=== International ===
As of match played 14 October 2014

Appearances and goals by national team and year
National team	Year	Apps	Goals
France	2014	4	0
Total		4	0

== Honours ==
Montpellier Youth

- Coupe Gambardella: 2008–09

Montpellier

- Ligue 1: 2011–12
