= Karim Rekik =

Dutch association football player

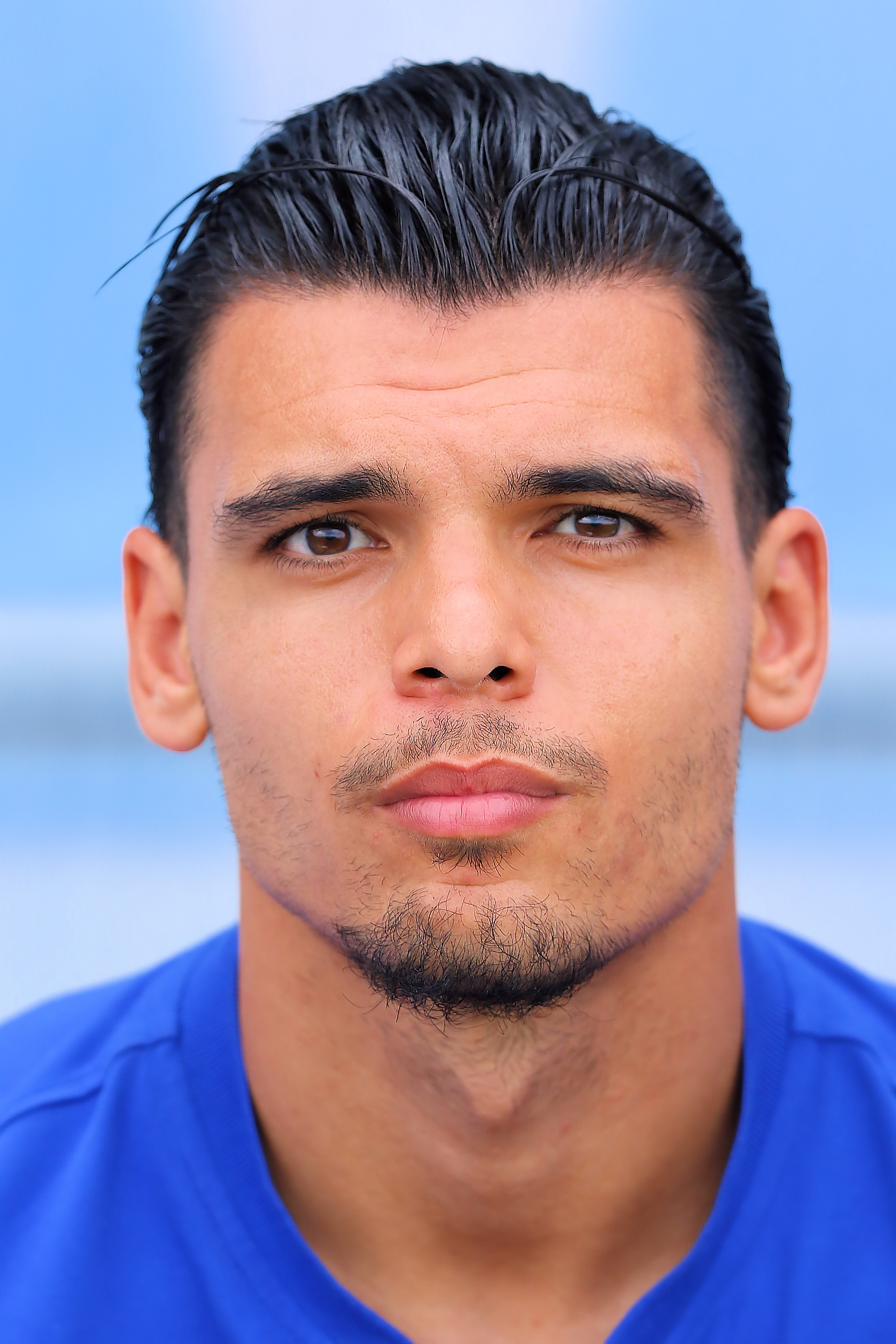
- Rekik in 2019

Personal information
- Full name: Karim Rekik
- Date of birth: 2 December 1994 (age 31)
- Place of birth: The Hague, Netherlands
- Height: 1.86 m (6 ft 1 in)
- Positions: Centre-back; left-back

Youth career
- 1999–2002: Scheveningen
- 2002–2011: Feyenoord
- 2011–2012: Manchester City

Senior career*
Years	Team	Apps	(Gls)
2011–2015	Manchester City	1	(0)
2012	→ Portsmouth (loan)	8	(0)
2013	→ Blackburn Rovers (loan)	5	(0)
2013–2015	→ PSV (loan)	54	(2)
2015–2017	Marseille	34	(1)
2017–2020	Hertha BSC	64	(3)
2020–2023	Sevilla	45	(1)
2023–2025	Al-Jazira	18	(0)

International career^{‡}
2009–2010	Netherlands U16	6	(0)
2010–2011	Netherlands U17	18	(1)
2011–2013	Netherlands U19	12	(1)
2014–2016	Netherlands U21	15	(1)
2014–2017	Netherlands	4	(0)
Medal record
Men's football
Representing Netherlands
UEFA European Under-17 Championship
Winner	2011 Serbia
- * Club domestic league appearances and goals as of 2 June 2024 ‡ National team caps and goals as of 14 November 2017

Karim Rekik (Arabic: كريم رقيق; born 2 December 1994) is a Dutch professional footballer who plays as a defender.

Rekik came through the youth academy at Feyenoord, before joining Premier League side Manchester City who he signed on a professional terms in 2011. He would only make one appearance for City in the league over a four-year spell, spending time on loan with Portsmouth, Blackburn Rovers and PSV. In 2015 he signed for Marseille where he remained for several seasons before joining Hertha BSC.

He has been capped at numerous international levels, including four caps for Netherlands between 2014 and 2017.

== Early life ==
Rekik was born in The Hague. His father was born in Tunisia and his mother is a Dutch primary school teaching assistant. He has a younger brother, Omar, who is also a professional footballer currently playing for NK Maribor.

Rekik started his football when he joined Scheveningen in 1999 before joining Feyenoord, where he went on to stay for nine years. But in March 2011, Manchester City made an approach for Rekik, as Feyernood were determined to keep a hold off him. The approach was to be controversial, as the club took the case matter to the Dutch FA, as a result of the club losing their youngsters to Premier League clubs. The club was also considering legal action against Rekik's agent Søren Lerby, though he insisted he was following FIFA's rules. The case was dismissed.

== Club career ==
=== Manchester City ===
Rekik signed for Manchester City from Feyenoord in the summer of 2011, and made his debut appearance for the first team in the Dublin Super Cup in pre-season.

He made his official first team debut for Manchester City on 21 September 2011 against Birmingham City in the third round of the League Cup, coming on as a substitute for Wayne Bridge in the last 12 minutes of the game. His debut against Birmingham City saw him become the youngest overseas player to appear in a senior game for City, just 16 years and 294 days old. He also made a 73rd-minute substitute appearance in the fourth round of the competition against Wolverhampton Wanderers at Molineux, in place of Luca Scapuzzi.

Rekik returned to Manchester City at the end of the 2011–12 season. On 5 December 2012, it was announced that Rekik signed a long-term contract with the club. He would go on to start in his Premier League debut, a 1–0 win at home to Reading on 22 December 2012, and was substituted for James Milner in the 84th minute. Reading claimed that they deserved a penalty for Rekik's challenge on Jay Tabb, which was not given by referee Mike Dean.

On 10 August 2014, Rekik was an unused substitute as City lost the Community Shield 3–0 to Arsenal at Wembley Stadium.

==== Loan spells in England ====
On 22 March 2012, it was confirmed that Michael Appleton was to take Scapuzzi and Rekik on a month's loan at Portsmouth in the Football League Championship. He made his debut for Portsmouth on 27 March, in a 2–0 home win against Hull City. This was also Rekik's first senior league appearance in club football. Unlike Scapuzzi, Rekik became a regular starter as Portsmouth struggled to fight relegation. He was an ever-present figure in the Portsmouth defence as the league came to an end. Nevertheless, Portsmouth were relegated at the end of the season.

On 15 February 2013, it was confirmed that Rekik would join Blackburn Rovers in the Championship until the end of the season. The move reunited him with his former Portsmouth manager Appleton. Rekik made his Blackburn Rovers debut, playing as a left-midfield, in a 2–0 loss against Hull City on 19 February 2013. Rekik went on to make five appearances for the club.

==== PSV Eindhoven (loan) ====
On 8 July 2013, it was confirmed that Rekik would join PSV Eindhoven on loan for the 2013–14 season, wearing number 3.

Rekik made his PSV Eindhoven debut, in the first leg of third round of Champions League, in a 2–0 win over Zulte Waregem on 30 July 2013. Three days later, Rekik made his league debut, in the opening game of the season, in a 3–2 win over ADO Den Haag. Rekik played the remaining three matches in the Champions League play-off, as PSV were knocked out by Milan. However, Rekik suffered an ankle injury, while in international duty. As a result, Rekik would be out for four weeks, though he would need to undergo surgery. The surgery was successful, resulting him out for another four weeks. After two months on the sidelines, Rekik made his return from the first team on 2 November 2013, in a 1–1 draw against PEC Zwolle. He then scored his first Eredivisie goal for PSV on 7 December in a 2–6 home defeat to Vitesse. Rekik went on to captain two games in absence of Georginio Wijnaldum against Utrecht and ADO Den Haag. Later in the 2013–14 season, Rekik became a regular starter at PSV, as he made twenty-five appearances for the club.

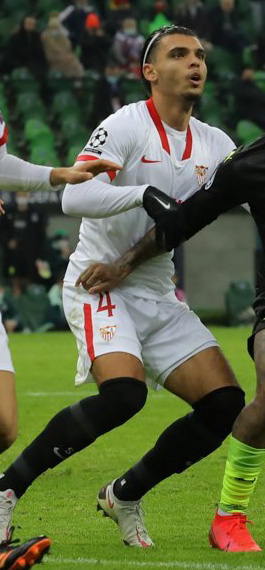
Rekik playing for Sevilla in 2020

Because of his good performance at PSV, Rekik was keen to re-join PSV for the second time next season, though he could return to Manchester City for next season. However, Rekik said he would not return to Manchester City next season unless he was given first team chances.

As his loan spell with PSV came to an end, Rekik was linked with a move to Marseille. Instead on 14 August 2014, it announced that Rekik returned to PSV until the end of the season. Rekik's first game after signing for the club on a loan for the second time came, in a 6–1 win over NAC Breda on 16 August 2014. Rekik then scored his second goal of his PSV career on 9 November 2014, in a 2–1 win over Heracles. Since making his second debut for PSV, Rekik continued to be in the first team in straight matches until he suffered a hamstring injury and was substituted during a match against AZ Alkmaar on 13 February 2015. After making his return to training, Rekik made his return to the first team on 22 March 2015, in a 2–1 loss against Feyernood. Despite this, Rekik later helped PSV win their first league since 2008. Rekik later spoke out about the club's winning the league. Like his first season at PSV, Rekik established himself in the first team with twenty-nine appearances and formed a strong central-defense partnership with Jeffrey Bruma.

Following the 2014–15 season came to an end, PSV was keen to sign Rekik for the third time. However, PSV decided not to sign him after Rekik made it clear that he wanted to play in a bigger league than the Eredivisie.

=== Marseille ===
On 30 June 2015, Rekik joined Marseille for an undisclosed fee after making just two appearances for Manchester City in four years. The move was later confirmed on 2 July 2015 and the player was unveiled, along with Lucas Ocampos. Rekik scored his first goal for Marseille in a 1–1 Ligue 1 draw with rivals Lyon on 20 September.

=== Hertha BSC ===
On 16 June 2017, he signed for Hertha BSC for a reported fee of €2.5 million as a long-term replacement for the departing John Anthony Brooks to VfL Wolfsburg.

=== Sevilla ===
On 5 October 2020, Rekik signed for Spanish club Sevilla FC until 2025.

=== Al Jazira ===
On 30 July 2023, Rekik signed for UAE Pro League club Al-Jazira.

== International career ==
Rekik was eligible to play for Netherlands, through his birthplace, and Tunisia, through his father.

Rekik was called up by Netherlands U17 in September 2010 and made his Netherlands U17 debut, in a 0–0 draw against Italy U17. Rekik was then called up into the squad by Netherlands U17 for the UEFA European Under-17 Championship and scored the opening game of the season, in a 2–0 win over Germany U17. Rekik went on to help the club reach the final, where Netherlands U17 beat Germany U17 5–2.

Rekik was then called up by Netherlands U19 in October 2011 and made his Netherlands U19 debut, in a 3–0 win over Moldova U19. Rekik then captained his first Netherlands U19 game, in a 2–0 win over Norway U19. Rekik went on to captain five times in his eleven appearances.

In August 2013, Rekik was first called up Netherlands for the two matches in the World Cup Qualifying, but was never used.

Rekik made his debut for the Netherlands national team in a 2–0 friendly defeat to France at the Stade de France 6 March 2014. In May 2014, he was named in manager Louis van Gaal's provisional 30-man squad for the 2014 FIFA World Cup. However, on 31 May 2014, van Gaal announced his final squad, which saw Rekik left out of the 23 man squad.

== Career statistics ==
=== Club ===
As of match played 31 May 2023

Appearances and goals by club, season and competition
Club	Season	League			National cup (Note: Includes FA Cup, KNVB Cup, Coupe de France, DFB-Pokal and Copa del Rey)		League cup (Note: Includes EFL Cup and Coupe de la Ligue)		Europe		Other		Total	
Club	Season	Division	Apps	Goals	Apps	Goals	Apps	Goals	Apps	Goals	Apps	Goals	Apps	Goals
Manchester City	2011–12	Premier League	0	0	0	0	2	0	0	0	0	0	2	0
Manchester City	2012–13	Premier League	1	0	0	0	0	0	0	0	0	0	1	0
Manchester City	Total		1	0	0	0	2	0	0	0	0	0	3	0
Portsmouth (loan)	2011–12	Championship	8	0	0	0	0	0	–		–		8	0
Blackburn Rovers (loan)	2012–13	Championship	5	0	0	0	0	0	–		–		5	0
PSV Eindhoven (loan)	2013–14	Eredivisie	25	1	0	0	–		6 (Note: Four appearances in UEFA Champions League, two appearances in UEFA Europa League)	0	–		31	1
PSV Eindhoven (loan)	2014–15	Eredivisie	29	1	1	0	–		8 (Note: Appearance(s) in UEFA Europa League)	0	–		38	1
PSV Eindhoven (loan)	Total		54	2	1	0	–		14	0	–		69	2
Marseille	2015–16	Ligue 1	24	1	6	0	1	0	5	0	–		36	1
Marseille	2016–17	Ligue 1	10	0	1	0	1	0	–		–		12	0
Marseille	Total		34	1	7	0	2	0	5	0	–		48	1
Marseille II	2016–17	CFA	1	0	–		–		–		–		1	0
Hertha BSC	2017–18	Bundesliga	26	2	2	0	–		3	0	–		31	2
Hertha BSC	2018–19	Bundesliga	24	0	3	0	–		–		–		27	0
Hertha BSC	2019–20	Bundesliga	14	1	2	0	–		–		–		16	1
Hertha BSC	2020–21	Bundesliga	0	0	1	0	–		–		–		1	0
Hertha BSC	Total		64	3	8	0	–		3	0	–		75	3
Sevilla	2020–21	La Liga	11	0	7	0	–		4 (Note: Appearance(s) in UEFA Champions League)	0	0	0	22	0
Sevilla	2021–22	La Liga	18	0	3	0	–		5 (Note: Four appearances in UEFA Champions League, one appearance in UEFA Europa League)	0	–		26	0
Sevilla	2022–23	La Liga	16	1	3	0	–		3 (Note: One appearance in UEFA Champions League, two appearances in UEFA Europa League)	0	–		22	1
Sevilla	Total		45	1	13	0	–		12	0	0	0	70	1
Career total			212	7	29	0	4	0	34	0	0	0	279	7

=== International ===
As of match played 14 November 2017

Appearances and goals by national team and year
National team	Year	Apps	Goals
Netherlands	2014	1	0
Netherlands	2017	3	0
Total		4	0

== Honours ==
PSV

- Eredivisie: 2014–15

Marseille

- Coupe de France runner-up: 2015–16

Sevilla

- UEFA Europa League: 2022–23

Al Jazira

- UAE League Cup: 2024-25

Netherlands U17

- UEFA European Under-17 Championship: 2011
