= Benjamin Mendy =

French footballer (born 1994)

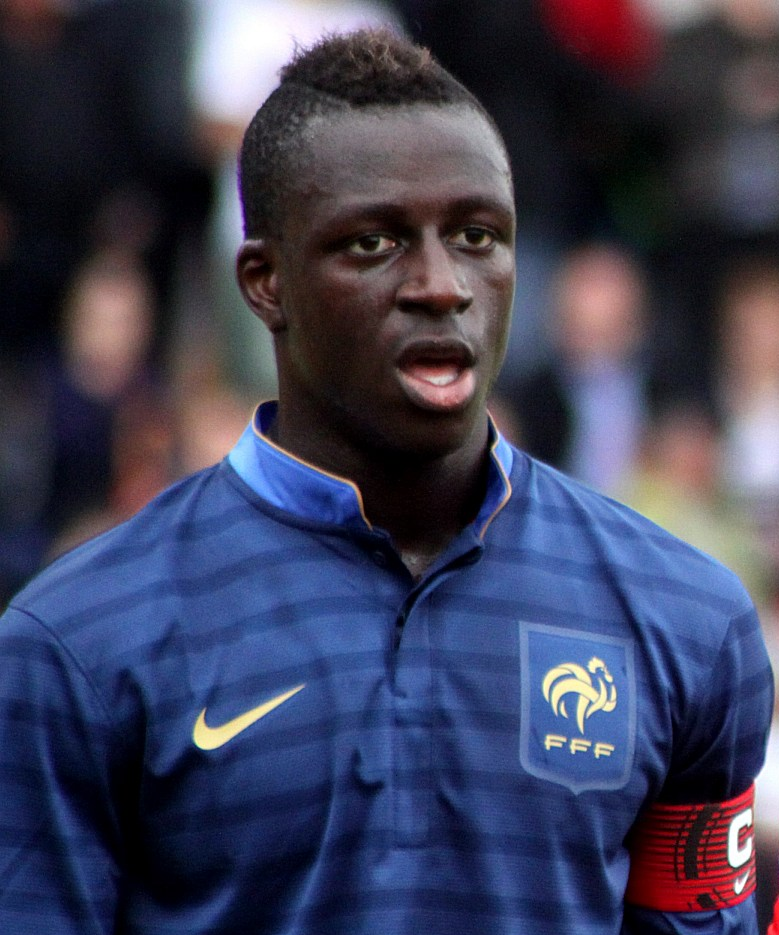
- Mendy with France U19 in 2013

Personal information
- Full name: Benjamin Mendy
- Date of birth: 17 July 1994 (age 32)
- Place of birth: Longjumeau, France
- Height: 1.85 m (6 ft 1 in)
- Position: Left-back

Team information
- Current team: Pogoń Szczecin
- Number: 23

Youth career
- 2000–2007: Palaiseau
- 2007–2011: Le Havre

Senior career*
Years	Team	Apps	(Gls)
2010–2013	Le Havre II	12	(0)
2011–2013	Le Havre	57	(0)
2013–2014	Marseille II	2	(0)
2013–2016	Marseille	81	(2)
2016–2017	Monaco	25	(0)
2017–2023	Manchester City	50	(2)
2023–2024	Lorient	15	(2)
2024–2025	Zürich	7	(0)
2025–	Pogoń Szczecin	20	(0)

International career^{‡}
2009–2010	France U16	15	(1)
2010–2011	France U17	17	(1)
2011–2012	France U18	5	(1)
2012–2013	France U19	12	(0)
2014–2016	France U21	9	(0)
2017–2019	France	10	(0)
Medal record
Men's football
Representing France
FIFA World Cup
Winner	2018 Russia
- * Club domestic league appearances and goals as of 16:50, 24 October 2026 (UTC) ‡ National team caps and goals as of 23:56, 17 November 2019 (UTC)

Benjamin Mendy (French pronunciation: [bɛ̃ʒamɛ̃ mɛndi]; born 17 July 1994) is a French professional footballer who plays as a left-back for Ekstraklasa club Pogoń Szczecin.

After coming through Le Havre's youth academy, Mendy began his playing career with the club's reserve team in 2010, being promoted to the first team a year later. He remained with the club until 2013, when he joined Ligue 1 club Marseille. Mendy spent the next three seasons with Les Olympiens before leaving for Monaco, with whom he won the national championship in 2016–17.

In 2017, Mendy moved to English club Manchester City for a reported £52 million, then the world-record transfer fee for a defender. He won the Premier League in his first season in England. In 2021, Mendy was arrested on allegations of sexual offences and suspended by City. He was acquitted of all charges against him in two trials in 2023. He was released by Manchester City in June 2023 and returned to Ligue 1 with Lorient. In 2025, he briefly played for Zürich of the Swiss Super League before moving to Pogoń Szczecin in Poland later that year.

Mendy made his senior debut for France in 2017 after previously being capped by France youth teams at under-16, under-17, under-18, under-19 and under-21 levels. He was chosen in France's squad for the 2018 World Cup, which they won.

== Club career ==
=== Le Havre ===
On 24 July 2011, Mendy signed his first professional contract, a three-year contract with Ligue 2 club Le Havre. Mendy made his professional debut on 9 August 2011 in the team's 2–1 Coupe de la Ligue second-round defeat to Amiens.

=== Marseille ===
On 8 July 2013, Mendy signed for Ligue 1 club Olympique de Marseille. Mendy was signed by manager Élie Baup, who had led Marseille to a second-place finish and qualification for the 2013–14 UEFA Champions League in the previous season. He made his club and Ligue 1 debut on 11 August against Guingamp, and scored his first goal for Marseille on 24 September against Saint-Étienne. Mendy was in the squad for all six group-stage matches, and made his European debut on 1 October at Borussia Dortmund. However, Marseille lost all their group-stage matches while falling out of the competition, and Baup was sacked in favor of former club manager José Anigo.

Mendy was sparingly used toward the end of the season by Anigo, and made just one start in Marseille's final fourteen games. His performance in the start, against Lille on 20 April 2014, was criticized by former Marseille left-back Éric Di Meco, who claimed he would "eat a rat" if Mendy ever made the France national team. After the season, Mendy was included on the 40-man shortlist for the 2014 Golden Boy award.

Mendy developed his game the following season under Argentinian manager Marcelo Bielsa, as Mendy claimed Bielsa had "given back to him the strength and aggressiveness lost last year." Mendy made 33 starts in the league in the 2014–15 campaign, getting 6 assists, as Marseille qualified for the Europa League. On 23 September 2015, Mendy was shown a straight red card shortly after coming on as a substitute against Toulouse, after he committed a professional foul on Toulouse's Jean-Daniel Akpa Akpro. Mendy would be given a two-match ban, and later missed a further 13 games for Marseille after picking up a hamstring injury against Caen in the Coupe de France on 3 January 2016.

Mendy played for five different managers in three seasons at the Stade Vélodrome. He made 101 competitive appearances with the club and had 14 assists to his name.

=== Monaco ===
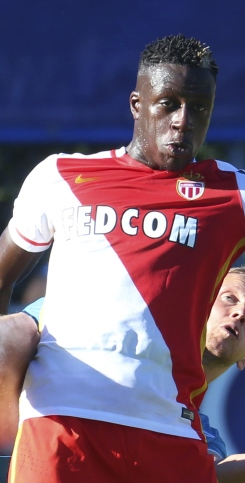
Mendy playing for Monaco in 2016

On 22 June 2016, Olympique de Marseille's Ligue 1 rivals Monaco announced that they had signed Mendy on a five-year contract. Mendy made his debut for the club in the first leg of the Champions League third round against Turkish club Fenerbahçe on 27 July. On 18 December against Lyon in Ligue 1, Mendy was shown a red card for kicking at the backside of Lyon midfielder Corentin Tolisso. This was his second dismissal of the season after he was sent off in the play-off round of the Champions League against Villarreal. Mendy was banned for five matches for the incident, later reduced to four as he made his return against Lorient on 22 January 2017.

On 4 February, Mendy assisted two of Monaco's goals by crossing the ball to the scorers Valère Germain and Radamel Falcao in their 3–0 Ligue 1 home win over Nice. Mendy scored his first goal for Monaco in the Coupe de France against former club Marseille on 1 March. The goal, scored in extra time, gave Monaco a 3–2 lead, as Mendy also provided two assists in the 4–3 victory. Monaco made a run to the semi-finals of the Champions League, and Mendy provided 4 assists in the campaign before they were eliminated by Juventus.

Mendy was a key part of Monaco's 2016–17 Ligue 1 championship season, making 24 starts in the league for Les Monégasques under manager Leonardo Jardim. Monaco scored a league-leading 107 goals during the season, and Mendy was noted along with fellow full-back Djibril Sidibé for their forward play. On 16 May, Mendy was named to the 2017 UNFP Team of the Year, along with 5 of his teammates. The next day, Monaco clinched the Ligue 1 title against Saint-Étienne on the penultimate day of the season, their first in 17 seasons in what would be Mendy's final game with the club. After the season, Mendy was part of the exodus away from the Stade Louis II that included starlets Bernardo Silva, Tiémoué Bakayoko, and later Kylian Mbappé.

=== Manchester City ===
On 24 July 2017, it was announced that Premier League club Manchester City had signed Mendy on a six-year contract, for a fee reported to be £52 million. The transfer fee eclipsed the previous record for a defender, set ten days prior by City on teammate Kyle Walker. On 23 September, Mendy sustained an injury against Crystal Palace, hurting his right knee in a challenge against Palace forward Andros Townsend.

The club later confirmed that he had ruptured the anterior cruciate ligament in his knee, and he underwent surgery in Barcelona on 29 September. Mendy returned from injury on 22 April 2018, as a 75th-minute substitute for Fabian Delph in a game against Swansea City at the City of Manchester Stadium. This appearance gave him the minimum five league games required to receive a Premier League winners' medal.

In the 2018–19 season, Mendy played in 10 of the first 12 Premier League games for City, assisting five goals in the process. On 14 November 2018, days after the 3–1 win against Manchester United, it was announced Mendy had once again undergone surgery in Barcelona for a cartilage problem in his left knee, and was expected to be out for 12 weeks.

On 28 November 2020, Mendy scored his first goal for City in a 5–0 home league win over Burnley. On 15 August 2021, he featured in the opening match of the 2021–22 season in a 1–0 defeat against Tottenham Hotspur, to be his last match at the club.

In August 2021, he was suspended by Manchester City after having been accused and charged with rape by several women and he ceased to play for the club while under suspension. Having not played in nearly two years due to his arrest, City announced they would release Mendy when his contract expired on 30 June 2023.

=== Lorient ===
On 19 July 2023, 23 months after his last appearance in professional football, Mendy signed a two-year contract with Ligue 1 club Lorient. Club owner Loïc Féry refused to comment when asked about the signing by radio station France Bleu. On 17 September, he made his debut for Lorient, coming off the bench in a 2–2 draw against Monaco. On 10 December, he scored his first goal since his return to football, in a 4–2 home loss to former club Marseille.

Affected by injury, Mendy took no part in 2024–25. He finished his spell at Lorient with 15 appearances, two goals and one assist.

=== Zürich ===
On 11 February 2025, Mendy left Lorient and signed for FC Zürich, who were 8th in the Swiss Super League. He signed until summer 2026. After just five months, his contract was dissolved by mutual agreement, having made just eight appearances.

=== Pogoń Szczecin ===
On 16 September 2025, Mendy signed a one-year deal with Polish club Pogoń Szczecin, with an option to extend. He made his debut against Jagiellonia Białystok on 9 November 2025. He extended his deal for a second season.

== International career ==
=== Youth ===
Mendy was a French youth international, having represented his nation at under-16 and under-17 level. In 2011, he was a part of the under-17 team that reached the quarter-finals at the 2011 U-17 World Cup.

=== Senior ===
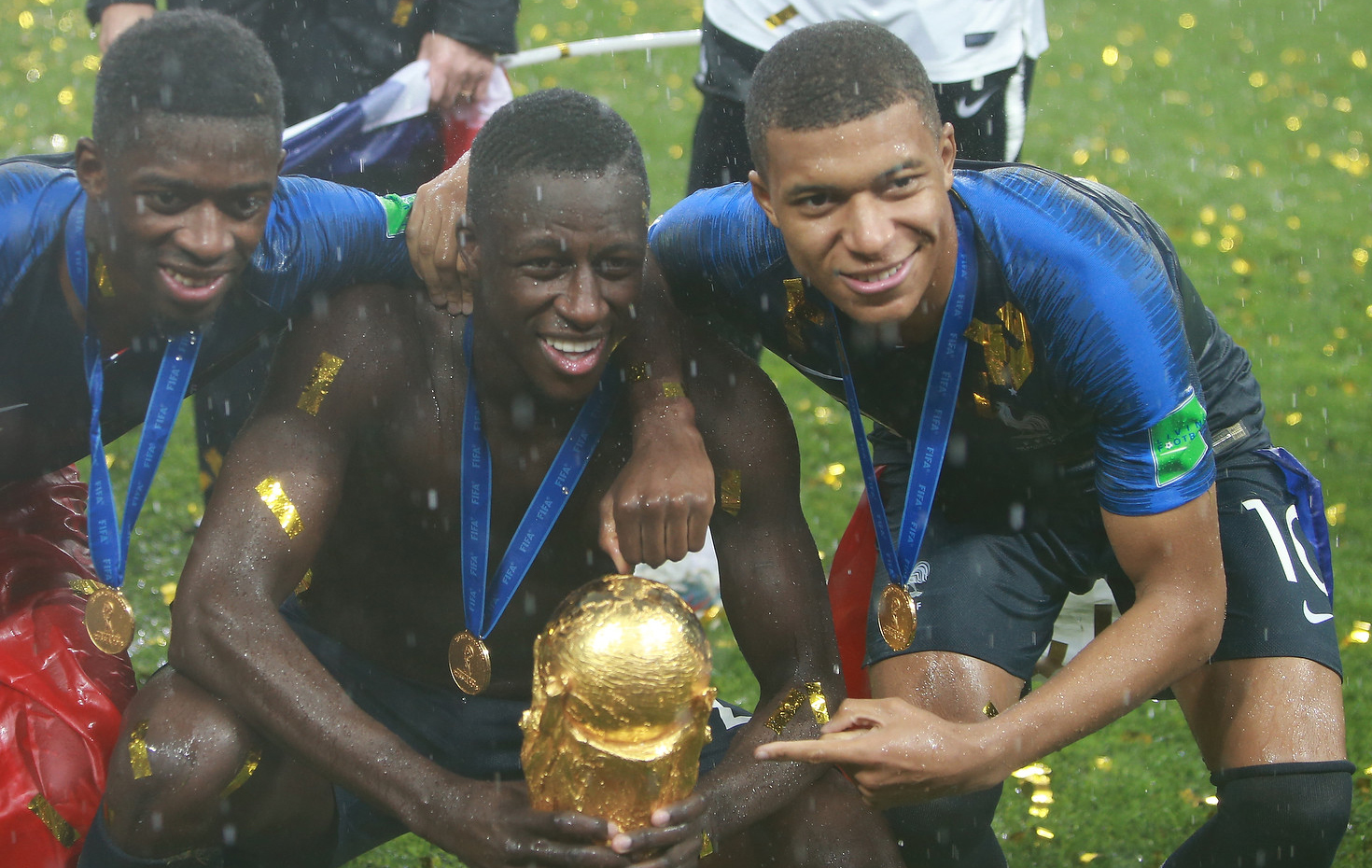
Mendy holding the FIFA World Cup Trophy with Kylian Mbappé and Ousmane Dembélé, 2018

Mendy was called up to the senior France squad for the first time to face Luxembourg and Spain in March 2017. He made his debut on 25 March 2017 against the former, playing the whole game in a 3–1 2018 World Cup qualification away win.

On 17 May 2018, he was called up to the French squad for the 2018 World Cup in Russia. He played 40 minutes as a substitute in a goalless group game against Denmark as France won the tournament. In July 2026, he sold his replica World Cup trophy for US$62,200 through American auctioneers Goldin Auctions.

== Personal life ==
=== Religion ===
Mendy is a Muslim and has made Hajj to Mecca.

=== Rape charges and acquittals ===
On 26 August 2021, Cheshire Constabulary charged Mendy with four counts of rape and one count of sexual assault and remanded him in custody. The initial charges related to alleged offences against three different female complainants, all aged over 16, between October 2020 and August 2021. His application for bail was refused, as he had broken prior bail conditions imposed that he should not host any house parties. Manchester City suspended him pending a trial. Mendy appeared in court on 10 September and was remanded in custody.

While he was in custody, Mendy was charged with three more counts of rape. On 7 January 2022, he was granted bail on condition that he live at his home address in Prestbury, Cheshire, not contact complainants and surrender his passport. Mendy pleaded not guilty on 22 May to seven charges of rape, one of attempted rape and one of sexual assault, relating to six complainants. On 1 June, Mendy was charged with an additional rape brought forward by a new complainant.

The trial began on 10 August 2022 at Chester Crown Court. Mendy was charged with eight rapes, one attempted rape and a sexual assault. He pleaded not guilty to all charges. The jury was made up of 14 jurors, eight men and six women, including two alternates; all had to certify that they had no connection to Manchester City, Manchester United or the police. On 13 September 2022, Mendy was found not guilty of one count of rape against a 19-year-old woman. Judge Stephen Everett told the jury to deliver a not guilty verdict after the prosecution decided not to pursue a guilty verdict on the one count.

On 13 January 2023, Mendy was found not guilty of six counts of rape and one count of sexual assault, while Matturie was found not guilty of six counts of rape and three of sexual assault. The same jury could not reach a verdict on another count of rape and one count of attempted rape against Mendy, as well as three counts of rape and three of sexual assault against Matturie. On 26 June, Mendy's retrial for his outstanding charges began at the same venue, with a new jury. Matturie was tried separately for his outstanding charges; two weeks later, Mendy was found not guilty of one charge of rape and one of attempted rape.

Following the result of his court case and acquittal, fellow footballers such as Jack Grealish, Paul Pogba, Vinícius Júnior, Rio Ferdinand, and Memphis Depay released messages in support of Mendy, with Depay showing concern for the lack of support for Mendy by FIFA, his club, national team, and the Premier League during the legal process.

In November 2023, it was announced that Mendy would be taking Manchester City to an employment tribunal after claiming that he was owed millions of pounds in unauthorised wage deductions. He alleged that the club had stopped paying him in September 2021 after he was initially charged and held in custody. In November 2024 an Employment Tribunal found that Mendy was entitled to receive the majority of his unpaid salary.

== Career statistics ==
=== Club ===
As of match played 24 October 2026

Appearances and goals by club, season and competition
Club	Season	League			National cup (Note: Includes Coupe de France, FA Cup, Swiss Cup, Polish Cup)		League cup (Note: Includes Coupe de la Ligue, EFL Cup)		Europe		Other		Total	
Club	Season	Division	Apps	Goals	Apps	Goals	Apps	Goals	Apps	Goals	Apps	Goals	Apps	Goals
Le Havre II	2010–11	CFA	10	0	—		—		—		—		10	0
Le Havre II	2012–13	CFA	2	0	—		—		—		—		2	0
Le Havre II	Total		12	0	—		—		—		—		12	0
Le Havre	2011–12	Ligue 2	29	0	2	0	1	0	—		—		32	0
Le Havre	2012–13	Ligue 2	28	0	3	0	1	0	—		—		32	0
Le Havre	Total		57	0	5	0	2	0	—		—		64	0
Marseille II	2013–14	CFA 2	2	0	—		—		—		—		2	0
Marseille	2013–14	Ligue 1	24	1	2	0	2	1	2 (Note: Appearance(s) in UEFA Champions League)	0	—		30	2
Marseille	2014–15	Ligue 1	33	0	1	0	1	0	—		—		35	0
Marseille	2015–16	Ligue 1	24	1	4	0	1	0	7 (Note: Appearances in UEFA Europa League)	0	—		36	1
Marseille	Total		81	2	7	0	4	1	9	0	—		101	3
Monaco	2016–17	Ligue 1	25	0	2	1	2	0	10	0	—		39	1
Manchester City	2017–18	Premier League	7	0	0	0	0	0	1	0	—		8	0
Manchester City	2018–19	Premier League	10	0	1	0	1	0	2	0	1 (Note: Appearance in FA Community Shield)	0	15	0
Manchester City	2019–20	Premier League	19	0	3	0	2	0	6	0	0	0	30	0
Manchester City	2020–21	Premier League	13	2	4	0	2	0	1	0	—		20	2
Manchester City	2021–22	Premier League	1	0	0	0	0	0	0	0	1	0	2	0
Manchester City	2022–23	Premier League	0	0	0	0	0	0	0	0	0	0	0	0
Manchester City	Total		50	2	8	0	5	0	10	0	2	0	75	2
Lorient	2023–24	Ligue 1	15	2	0	0	—		—		—		15	2
Zürich	2024–25	Swiss Super League	7	0	1	0	—		—		—		8	0
Pogoń Szczecin	2025–26	Ekstraklasa	11	0	0	0	—		—		—		11	0
Pogoń Szczecin	2026–27	Ekstraklasa	9	0	1	0	—		—		—		10	0
Pogoń Szczecin	Total		20	0	1	0	—		—		—		20	0
Career total			269	6	24	1	13	1	29	0	2	0	337	8

=== International ===
As of match played 17 November 2019

Appearances and goals by national team and year
National team	Year	Apps	Goals
France	2017	4	0
France	2018	5	0
France	2019	1	0
Total		10	0

== Honours ==
Marseille

- Coupe de France runner-up: 2015–16

Monaco

- Ligue 1: 2016–17
- Coupe de la Ligue runner-up: 2016–17

Manchester City

- Premier League: 2017–18, 2018–19, 2020–21
- EFL Cup: 2019–20, 2020–21
- FA Community Shield: 2018
- UEFA Champions League runner-up: 2020–21

France

- FIFA World Cup: 2018

Individual

- UNFP Ligue 1 Team of the Year: 2016–17

Orders

- Knight of the Legion of Honour: 2018
