= Gaël Andonian =

Armenian footballer (born 1995)

Personal information
- Date of birth: 7 February 1995 (age 31)
- Place of birth: Marseille, France
- Height: 1.85 m (6 ft 1 in)
- Position: Centre-back

Team information
- Current team: Ardziv

Youth career
- 2001–2003: AS Gemenosienne
- 2003–2004: Aubagne
- 2004–2014: Marseille

Senior career*
| Years | Team | Apps | (Gls) |
| 2012–2018 | Marseille II | 71 | (3) |
| 2014–2018 | Marseille | 1 | (0) |
| 2015–2016 | → Dijon (loan) | 6 | (1) |
| 2015–2016 | → Dijon II (loan) | 6 | (0) |
| 2017 | → Veria (loan) | 10 | (0) |
| 2018 | Sunderland | 0 | (0) |
| 2019 | Ajaccio | 0 | (0) |
| 2020 | Martigues | 1 | (0) |
| 2020–2021 | Aubagne | 0 | (0) |
| 2021–2022 | Marseille Endoume | 16 | (0) |
| 2022– | Ardziv | 9 | (0) |

International career^{‡}
| 2011 | France U16 | 2 | (0) |
| 2015–2018 | Armenia | 23 | (0) |
- * Club domestic league appearances and goals as of 23:40, 20 April 2022 (UTC) ‡ National team caps and goals as of 4 June 2018

Gaël Andonian (Armenian: Կաէլ Անտոնեան; born 7 February 1995) is a professional footballer who plays as a centre-back for Championnat National 3 club EUGA Ardziv. Born in France, he represents the Armenia national team.

He began his career with hometown club Marseille, making one substitute appearance in Ligue 1 and playing mostly for the reserves.

== Club career ==
Born in Marseille, Andonian is a youth exponent from hometown club Marseille. He was first called into a matchday squad for their 1–0 win away at Nancy on 16 September 2012, remaining an unused substitute. His only other call-up that season was on 6 December, again unused as Marseille lost 3–0 away to AEL Limassol in the UEFA Europa League, both teams already eliminated.

He made his professional debut in a 2–1 Ligue 1 home win against Lens on 2 November 2014, replacing Florian Thauvin for the last 10 minutes.

On 21 October 2015, having taken no part in Marseille's season, Andonian was loaned to Ligue 2 club Dijon for the remainder of the season. He made six appearances in Ligue 2 as the team from Burgundy won promotion, scoring his first professional goal as a last-minute equaliser in a 2–2 draw at Niort on 8 January 2016, and contributing to the own goal that was their other strike in the game. Additionally, Andonian made two appearances in the Coupe de la Ligue, and two appearances in the Coupe de France.

On 27 January 2017, Andonian was loaned to Super League Greece club Veria for the remainder of the season. He made 10 appearances for Veria, and was sent off on 12 March in a 1–0 loss at Platanias.

In September 2018 following his release from Marseille, Andonian had a spell on trial at EFL League One side Sunderland, and played an under-23 match against West Bromwich Albion. Manager Jack Ross did not sign him due to wage issues, as the club were involved in protracted situations regarding Papy Djilobodji and Didier Ndong.

On 18 July 2019, Andonian signed a one-year contract with Ajaccio of Ligue 2. He was an unused substitute eight days later in a 2–2 home draw against Le Havre. Hampered by a shoulder injury, he took no part in the rest of the season and his contract was terminated at its midway point.

Andonian signed for Martigues of the Championnat National 2 on 1 February 2020. That September, he signed for Aubagne of the same league.

== International career ==
In 2011, Andonian played two friendlies for France under-16, both goalless draws against Slovenia on 5 and 7 April.

On 26 February 2015, the president of the Armenian Football Federation Ruben Hayrapetyan announced that Andonian would arrive in the Armenian capital Yerevan on 21 March to receive Armenian citizenship and officially join the Armenia national football team.

Eight days later he received his first international cap, playing the full 90 minutes against Albania in a 2–1 defeat at the Elbasan Arena in UEFA Euro 2016 qualifying.

== Career statistics ==
=== Club ===
As of match played 17 April 2022

Appearances and goals by club, season and competition
| Club | Season | League | | | National Cup | | League Cup | | Other | | Total | |
| Club | Season | Division | Apps | Goals | Apps | Goals | Apps | Goals | Apps | Goals | Apps | Goals |
|---|---|---|---|---|---|---|---|---|---|---|---|---|
| Marseille II | 2012–13 | Championnat de France Amateur 2 | 18 | 1 | — | | — | | — | | 18 | 1 |
| Marseille II | 2013–14 | Championnat de France Amateur 2 | 5 | 0 | — | | — | | — | | 5 | 0 |
| Marseille II | 2014–15 | Championnat de France Amateur 2 | 21 | 2 | — | | — | | — | | 21 | 2 |
| Marseille II | 2015–16 | Championnat de France Amateur | 2 | 0 | — | | — | | — | | 2 | 0 |
| Marseille II | 2016–17 | Championnat de France Amateur | 13 | 0 | — | | — | | — | | 13 | 0 |
| Marseille II | 2017–18 | Championnat National 2 | 12 | 0 | — | | — | | — | | 12 | 0 |
| Marseille II | Total | | 71 | 3 | — | | — | | — | | 71 | 3 |
| Marseille | 2014–15 | Ligue 1 | 1 | 0 | 0 | 0 | 0 | 0 | — | | 1 | 0 |
| Dijon (loan) | 2015–16 | Ligue 2 | 6 | 1 | 2 | 0 | 2 | 0 | — | | 10 | 1 |
| Dijon II (loan) | 2015–16 | Championnat de France Amateur 2 | 6 | 0 | — | | — | | — | | 6 | 0 |
| Veria (loan) | 2016–17 | Super League Greece | 10 | 0 | 0 | 0 | — | | — | | 10 | 0 |
| Ajaccio | 2019–20 | Ligue 2 | 0 | 0 | 0 | 0 | 0 | 0 | — | | 0 | 0 |
| Martigues | 2019–20 | Championnat National 2 | 1 | 0 | 0 | 0 | — | | — | | 1 | 0 |
| Marseille Endoume | 2021–22 | Championnat National 3 | 12 | 0 | 0 | 0 | — | | — | | 12 | 0 |
| Career total | | | 107 | 4 | 2 | 0 | 2 | 0 | 0 | 0 | 111 | 4 |

=== International ===
As of match played 4 June 2018

Appearances and goals by national team and year
| National team | Year | Apps | Goals |
|---|---|---|---|
| Armenia | 2015 | 6 | 0 |
| Armenia | 2016 | 7 | 0 |
| Armenia | 2017 | 7 | 0 |
| Armenia | 2018 | 3 | 0 |
| Total | | 23 | 0 |
