= Florian Thauvin =

French footballer (born 1993)

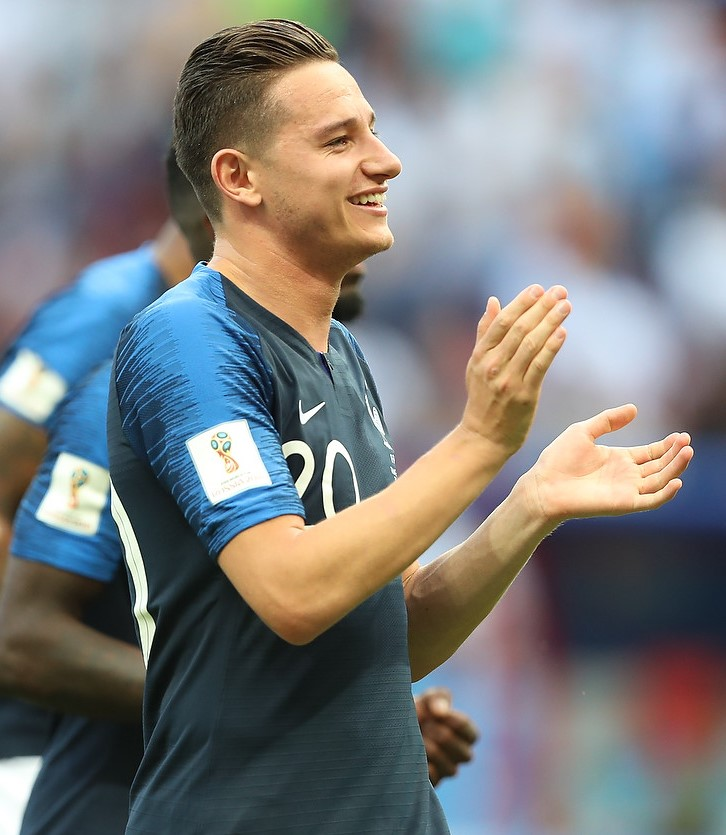
- Thauvin with France in the 2018 FIFA World Cup

Personal information
- Full name: Florian Tristan Mariano Thauvin
- Date of birth: 26 January 1993 (age 33)
- Place of birth: Orléans, Loiret, France
- Height: 1.81 m (5 ft 11 in)
- Positions: Right winger; forward

Team information
- Current team: Lens
- Number: 10

Youth career
- 2000–2005: Ingre
- 2005–2007: Saint-Jean-de-la-Ruelle
- 2007–2008: Orléans
- 2008–2011: Grenoble

Senior career*
Years	Team	Apps	(Gls)
2010–2011	Grenoble	3	(0)
2011–2013	Bastia	32	(3)
2013	Lille	0	(0)
2013	→ Bastia (loan)	13	(7)
2013–2015	Marseille	69	(13)
2015–2017	Newcastle United	13	(0)
2016–2017	→ Marseille (loan)	52	(17)
2017–2021	Marseille	106	(46)
2021–2023	Tigres UANL	38	(8)
2023–2025	Udinese	70	(13)
2025–	Lens	44	(15)

International career^{‡}
2011	France U18	2	(0)
2012	France U19	2	(0)
2012–2013	France U20	16	(7)
2013–2014	France U21	10	(7)
2021	France Olympic	4	(0)
2017–	France	13	(2)
Medal record
Men's football
Representing France
FIFA World Cup
Winner	2018 Russia
FIFA U-20 World Cup
Winner	2013 Turkey
- * Club domestic league appearances and goals as of 21:38, 21 November 2026 (UTC) ‡ National team caps and goals as of 16 November 2025

Florian Tristan Mariano Thauvin (French pronunciation: [flɔʁjɑ̃ tovɛ̃]; born 26 January 1993) is a French professional footballer who plays as a right winger for Ligue 1 club Lens, whom he captains, and the France national team.

He made his professional debut for Grenoble in 2011, moving on to Bastia where he won the Ligue 2 title in his first season and being named Young Player of the Year a year later. He then moved to Marseille for €15 million in 2017, going on to make over 281 appearances and score 86 goals across two spells at the team, with a brief time at Newcastle United of the Premier League in between. He then moved to Tigres UANL in Mexico in June 2021, making 38 total league appearances before moving abroad to Italian side Udinese in January 2023.

Thauvin earned 30 caps and scored 14 goals for France from under-18 to under-21 level, winning the 2013 FIFA U-20 World Cup. He made his senior debut in June 2017 and was part of their squad that won the 2018 FIFA World Cup. In 2021, Thauvin played for the France Olympic team at the 2020 Summer Olympics. Having been absent from the national team for six years, he was recalled to the French senior squad in October 2025. He scored in his return against Azerbaijan as late substitute.

== Club career ==
=== Early career ===
Thauvin was born in Orléans, Loiret. He played for youth teams at Ingre, Saint-Jean-de-la-Ruelle, Orléans, and Grenoble before rising through the ranks at the latter, and drawing the interest of larger clubs. He made his first team debut for Grenoble on 11 March 2011 in a 1–1 Ligue 2 away draw against Vannes. Grenoble was relegated to the CFA 2 after its liquidation in July 2011.

=== Bastia ===
On 19 July 2011, Thauvin departed the club and signed his first professional contract with Corsican side Bastia. On 28 October 2012, he scored his first goal for Bastia in a 3–1 victory over Bordeaux. He helped Bastia to Ligue 2 title triumph in 2012.

On 29 January 2013, Thauvin signed a four-and-a-half-year deal with Ligue 1 club Lille for a reported fee of €3.5 million. As part of the deal, he was immediately sent back to Bastia on a six-month loan deal, keeping him at the top-flight Corsican club until the end of the 2012–13 season. Following his impressive displays that season, Thauvin was named the Ligue 1 Young Player of the Year.

=== Marseille ===
On 3 September 2013, after weeks of drawn-out negotiations and without making single appearance for Lille, Thauvin signed a five-year deal with Marseille. The 20-year-old had been absent from training due to disputes over an improved contract, and forced a move to the Stade Velodrome, eventually signing for €15 million including bonuses.

On 4 January 2015, Thauvin was the only Marseille player to miss in the penalty shootout as they were eliminated from the Coupe de France last 64 by fourth-tier former club Grenoble. Thauvin made 81 appearances over two seasons, scoring 15 goals.

=== Newcastle United ===
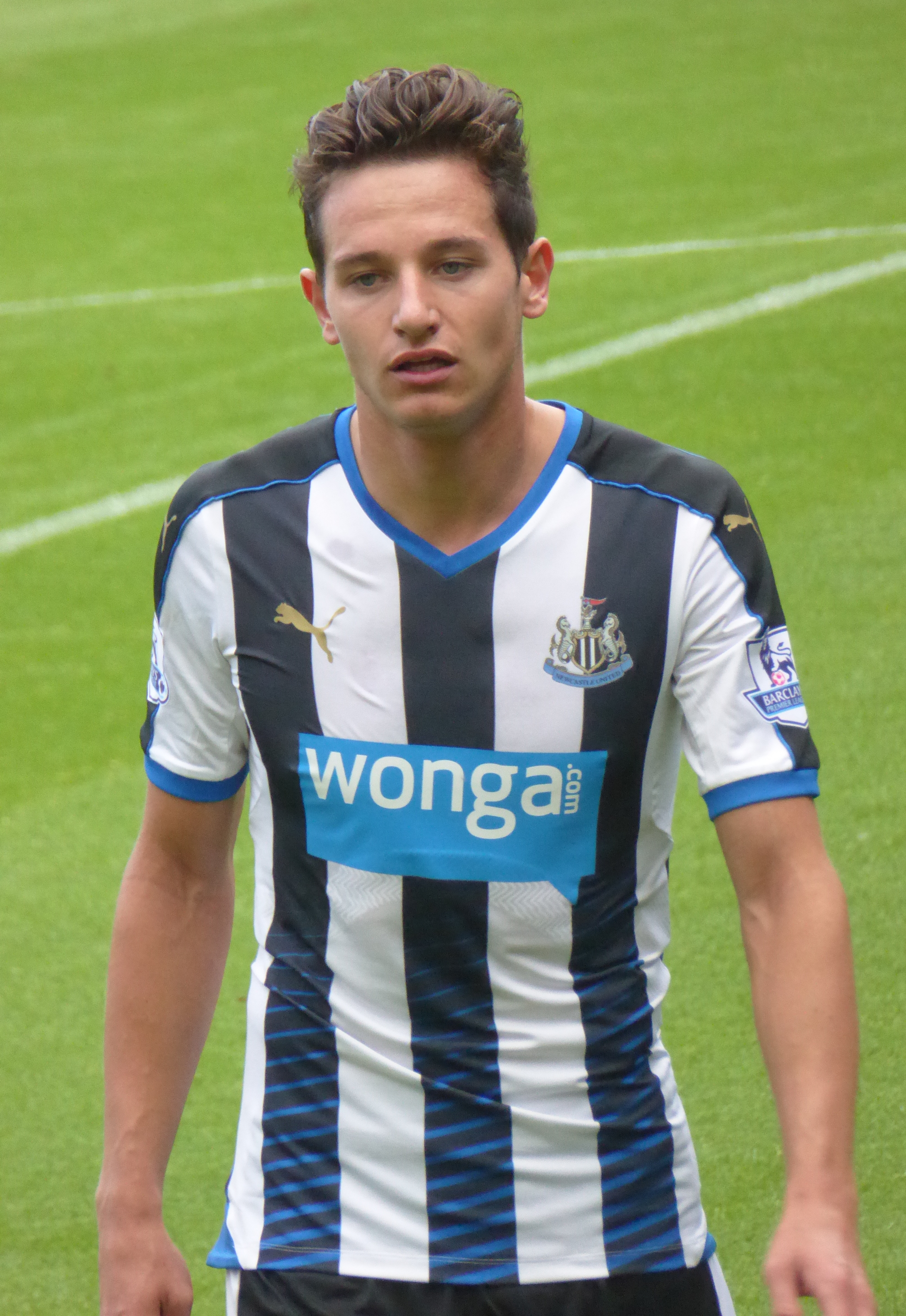
Thauvin playing for Newcastle in 2015

On 19 August 2015, Thauvin joined Newcastle United signing a five-year deal, for a reported fee of £15 million, with Rémy Cabella going in the other direction to Marseille on a season-long deal, with an option to buy. Thauvin was handed the departing Cabella's number 20 shirt. He made his debut three days later, replacing compatriot Gabriel Obertan, in the 69th minute of a goalless draw against Manchester United at Old Trafford, a game in which he had a chance to score a winner, but he was unable to reach a cross. He made his first start for the club against Northampton Town in the League Cup second round on 25 August, scoring a goal and making three assists in a 4–1 home victory.

Thauvin was criticised by Newcastle's all-time top scorer Alan Shearer for turning up to a game wearing a tuxedo. In February 2016, he told L'Équipe that the criticism was unfair and affected his performances.

=== Return to Marseille ===
On 31 January 2016, Newcastle announced Thauvin would return to Marseille on loan for the rest of the season. In the first game of his loan, on 2 February, he was sent off ten minutes after coming on as a substitute at Montpellier for a foul on Hilton. He scored the only goal on 20 April as they beat FC Sochaux-Montbéliard 1–0 away in the semi-finals to reach the final of the 2016 Coupe de France against Le Classique rivals Paris Saint-Germain, which they lost 4–2 with Thauvin scoring a goal.

On 4 August 2016, Thauvin began his second loan spell at Marseille, signing a season-long loan deal; Newcastle inserted a clause in the contract which gave Marseille the option to make the deal permanent. In November 2016, it was reported that the loan spell would be made permanent in the summer of 2017, with Marseille agreeing to pay £9.8 million (€11m) for Thauvin's permanent transfer once he had played just three matches for the club during his second loan spell.

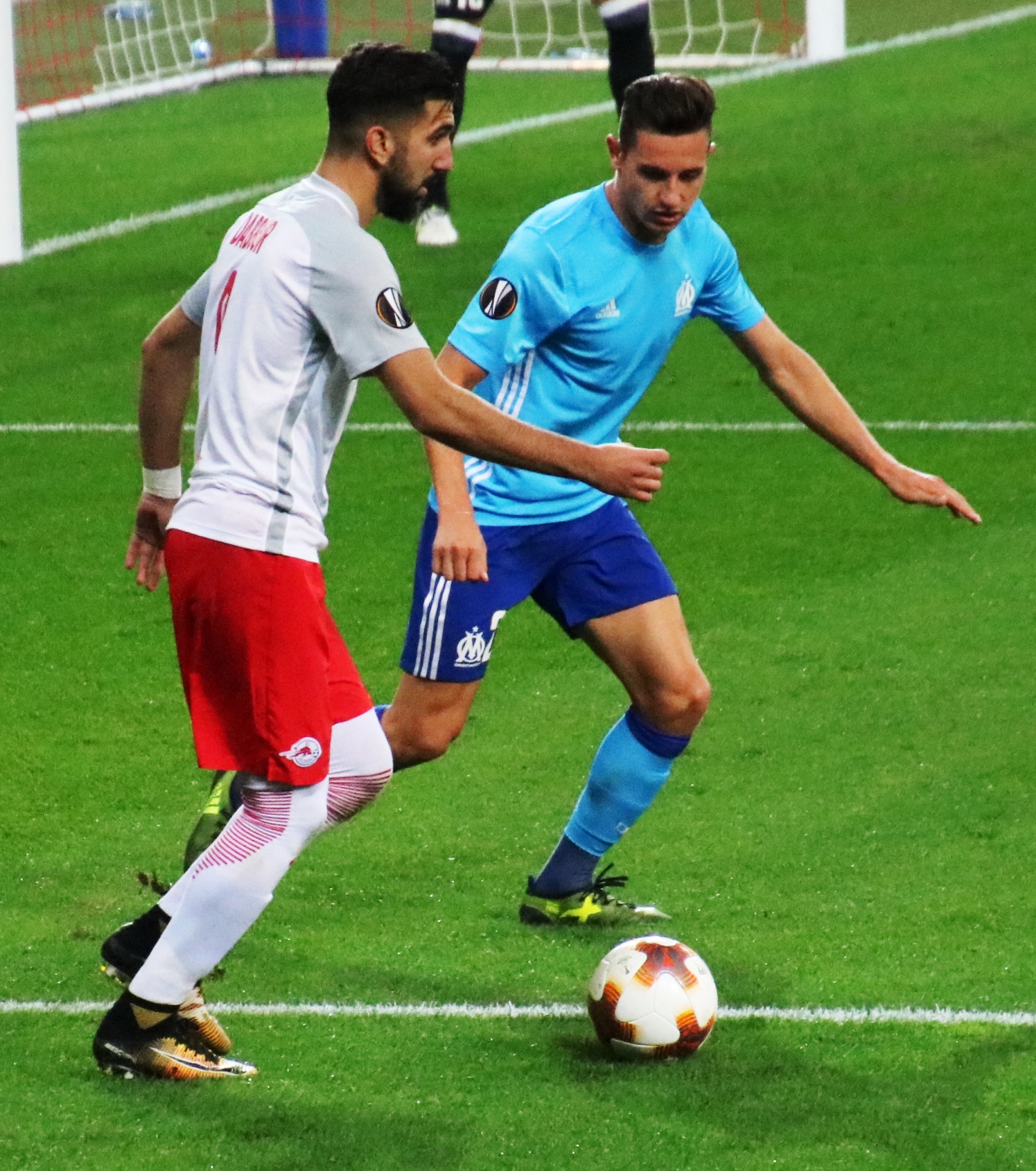
Thauvin (in blue) in action against Salzburg in September 2017

Thauvin captained Marseille for the first time in the 2016–17 Coupe de France round of 64 away match against Toulouse on 8 January 2017, which Marseille won 2–1. On 10 March, he scored two goals in the 3–0 Ligue 1 home win over Angers, taking his tally to four goals in his last four Ligue 1 matches. He was the UNFP Player of the Month for March, with three goals and two assists. On 30 April, Thauvin scored the first hat-trick of his senior club career and assisted one of Maxime Lopez's two goals in a 5–1 Ligue 1 away win over Caen.

On 2 February 2018, Thauvin scored another hat-trick in a 6–3 home win over Metz. He won two more Player of the Month awards for November and February, and finished the 2017–18 Ligue 1 season with 22 goals, behind only PSG's Edinson Cavani for top scorer. He was one of four candidates for the Player of the Season award, that ultimately went to the Parisians' Neymar. In the season's Europa League, he contributed four goals in fourteen games for the team, who lost the final to Atlético Madrid in Lyon.

In 2018–19, Thauvin was Ligue 1's fourth-highest scorer with 16 goals in 33 games, though Marseille finished fifth and missed out on European football; his tally included a hat-trick in a 3–1 win at Amiens on 25 November. He was sent off two months later in a 2–1 home loss to Lille. In September 2019, he was ruled out with ankle ligament injury, returning in March only for the season to be abandoned due to the coronavirus pandemic. On 13 September 2020, Thauvin scored the only goal of an away win against Paris Saint-Germain, to grant Marseille their first win in Le Classique since November 2011.

=== Tigres UANL ===
On 7 May 2021, Thauvin signed with Mexican team, Tigres UANL, joining the club after finishing out his contract with Marseille in June 2021 and reuniting with former Marseille teammate André-Pierre Gignac. After participating in the 2020 Tokyo Summer Olympics he made his Tigres debut on 7 August 2021 against Santos Laguna. Thauvin was sent off in the 35th minute.

On 23 January 2023, Tigres announced that they had terminated Thauvin's contract. Despite being terminated from the team on the 4th week of the Clausura 2023 tournament, Florian was recognized as a Liga MX champion.

=== Udinese ===
On 31 January 2023, Thauvin joined Serie A club Udinese on a two-and-a-half-year deal. Later that year, on 23 October, he scored his first goal for the club from a penalty in a 1–1 draw with Lecce.

=== Lens ===
On 8 August 2025, Thauvin returned to France and signed a three-season contract with Lens. He scored 14 goals and registered 11 assists in all competitions in his debut season as the club finished as runners-up in Ligue 1 and achieved their first-ever title in the Coupe de France, where he also scored in the 3–1 win over Nice in the final. On 16 August 2026, he scored the only goal in a 1–0 win over Paris Saint-Germain in the Trophée des Champions, granting Lens their first-ever title in the competition. Later that month, on 29 August, he scored his 100th goal in Ligue 1, netting in a 2–1 away defeat against Strasbourg.

== International career ==
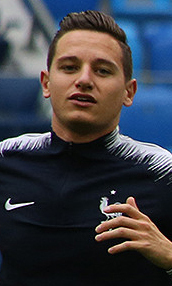
Thauvin at the 2018 FIFA World Cup

=== Youth ===
Thauvin was a regular in the France national youth football team and represented them at the under-18, under-19, under-20 and under-21 levels. Thauvin was a member of the French squad which won the 2013 FIFA U-20 World Cup in Turkey. He scored a penalty in the 4–0 win over Uzbekistan in the quarter-finals and a brace in a 2–1 victory against Ghana in the semi-finals.

=== Senior ===
Thauvin was called up to the senior France squad for the first time to face Luxembourg in a 2018 World Cup qualifying match on 25 March 2017 and Spain in a friendly three days later; he did not play in either match. On 2 June 2017, Thauvin made his debut for Les Bleus in a 5–0 friendly win over Paraguay, coming on in the 80th minute as a substitute for Antoine Griezmann.

Thauvin was selected in the 23-man squad for the 2018 FIFA World Cup in Russia. He played one minute as Didier Deschamps' team won the tournament, in a 4–3 win over Argentina in the last 16 in Kazan in place of Kylian Mbappé.

On 11 June 2019, Thauvin scored a bicycle kick (his first senior international goal) in the 4–0 away win over Andorra in a UEFA Euro 2020 qualifying match, after having assisted Wissam Ben Yedder's goal 16 minutes earlier.

Thauvin was named as one of three overage players for the French Olympic team for the 2020 tournament in Japan. One of the others was his new Tigres teammate, André-Pierre Gignac.

On 6 October 2025, Thauvin was called up to the France squad for the first time in 6 years, following the withdrawal of Bradley Barcola due to an injury. On 11 October, Thauvin returned to the pitch for the senior team for the first time since 2020. He replaced Kylian Mbappé in the 83rd minute, taking less than 2 minutes to score a left foot half volley to take the score to 3–0 against Azerbaijan.

== Style of play ==
In January 2014, he was named by The Observer as one of the ten most promising young players in Europe. Former Toulouse manager Alain Casanova called Thauvin "a player in the image of Franck Ribéry … someone who is able to disrupt any opponent, someone very dangerous when he picks up speed. Very dangerous indeed." ESPN columnist Andy Brassell described him in 2013 as a wide player who is a "left-footer with fine acceleration and jaw-dropping close control."

== Career statistics ==
=== Club ===
As of match played 21 November 2026

Appearances and goals by club, season and competition
Club	Season	League			National cup (Note: Includes Coupe de France, FA Cup, Coppa Italia)		League cup (Note: Includes Coupe de la Ligue, Football League Cup)		Continental		Other		Total	
Club	Season	Division	Apps	Goals	Apps	Goals	Apps	Goals	Apps	Goals	Apps	Goals	Apps	Goals
Grenoble	2010–11	Ligue 2	3	0	0	0	0	0	—		—		3	0
Bastia	2011–12	Ligue 2	13	0	2	0	0	0	—		—		15	0
Bastia	2012–13	Ligue 1	32	10	1	0	2	0	—		—		35	10
Bastia	Total		45	10	3	0	2	0	—		—		50	10
Marseille	2013–14	Ligue 1	31	8	2	1	2	0	6 (Note: Appearances in UEFA Champions League)	1	—		41	10
Marseille	2014–15	Ligue 1	36	5	1	0	1	0	—		—		38	5
Marseille	2015–16	Ligue 1	2	0	0	0	0	0	—		—		2	0
Marseille	Total		69	13	3	1	3	0	6	1	—		81	15
Newcastle United	2015–16	Premier League	13	0	1	0	2	1	—		—		16	1
Marseille (loan)	2015–16	Ligue 1	14	2	4	2	—		2 (Note: Appearances in UEFA Europa League)	0	—		20	4
Marseille (loan)	2016–17	Ligue 1	38	15	3	0	2	0	—		—		43	15
Marseille	2017–18	Ligue 1	35	22	3	0	1	0	15	4	—		54	26
Marseille	2018–19	Ligue 1	33	16	1	0	0	0	3	2	—		37	18
Marseille	2019–20	Ligue 1	2	0	0	0	0	0	—		—		2	0
Marseille	2020–21	Ligue 1	36	8	1	0	—		6	0	1 (Note: Appearance in Trophée des Champions)	0	44	8
Marseille	Total		158	63	12	2	3	0	26	6	1	0	200	71
Tigres UANL	2021–22	Liga MX	28	5	—		—		—		1 (Note: Appearance in Leagues Cup)	0	29	5
Tigres UANL	2022–23	Liga MX	10	3	—		—		—		—		10	3
Tigres UANL	Total		38	8	—		—		—		1	0	39	8
Udinese	2022–23	Serie A	16	0	—		—		—		—		16	0
Udinese	2023–24	Serie A	29	5	2	1	—		—		—		31	6
Udinese	2024–25	Serie A	25	8	1	1	—		—		—		26	9
Udinese	Total		70	13	3	2	—		—		—		73	15
Lens	2025–26	Ligue 1	33	11	4	3	—		—		—		37	14
Lens	2026–27	Ligue 1	10	4	0	0	—		4	1	1	1	15	6
Lens	Total		44	15	4	3	—		4	1	1	1	53	20
Career total			439	121	26	8	10	1	36	8	3	1	515	140

=== International ===
As of match played 16 November 2025

Appearances and goals by national team and year
National team	Year	Apps	Goals
France	2017	2	0
France	2018	5	0
France	2019	3	1
France	2020	0	0
France	2021	0	0
France	2022	0	0
France	2023	0	0
France	2024	0	0
France	2025	3	1
Total		13	2

France score listed first, score column indicates score after each Thauvin goal

List of international goals scored by Florian Thauvin
No.	Date	Venue	Cap	Opponent	Score	Result	Competition
1	11 June 2019	Estadi Nacional, Andorra la Vella, Andorra	10	Andorra	3–0	4–0	UEFA Euro 2020 qualification
2	10 October 2025	Parc des Princes, Paris, France	11	Azerbaijan	3–0	3–0	2026 FIFA World Cup qualification

== Honours ==
Bastia

- Ligue 2: 2011–12

Marseille

- UEFA Europa League runner-up: 2017–18

Tigres UANL

- Liga MX: Clausura 2023

Lens

- Coupe de France: 2025–26
- Trophée des Champions: 2026

France U20

- FIFA U-20 World Cup: 2013

France

- FIFA World Cup: 2018

Individual

- UNFP Ligue 1 Young Player of the Year: 2012–13
- UNFP Ligue 1 Player of the Month: March 2017, November 2017, January 2018, September 2025, November 2025, March 2026
- UNFP Ligue 1 Team of the Year: 2025–26

Orders

- Knight of the Legion of Honour: 2018
