= Moussa Sao =

French footballer (born 1989)

Personal information
- Date of birth: 17 October 1989 (age 37)
- Place of birth: Fontenay-aux-Roses, France
- Height: 1.86 m (6 ft 1 in)
- Positions: Striker; winger

Team information
- Current team: Toulon
- Number: 22

Senior career*
Years	Team	Apps	(Gls)
2013–2015	Le Havre	36	(6)
2015–2018	Sochaux	85	(9)
2018–2020	Red Star	44	(3)
2020–2021	Laval	21	(1)
2021–	Toulon	6	(1)
- * Club domestic league appearances and goals as of 20 November 2021

Moussa Sao (born 17 October 1989) is a French-Senegalese professional footballer who plays as a striker or as a winger for Toulon. Sao is a two-footed player and is a former Futsal player who played at international level for France in his youth. He has made himself available for the Senegal national football team.

== Career ==
Sao played both football and futsal as a youth, but broke through in futsal when spotted by Cannes Bocca. A good season where he was top scorer with 53 goals saw him called up to the France national futsal team, for whom he was selected ten times and scored 14 goals. His success brought attention from professional football clubs, and after a number of trials he signed a two-year deal with Le Havre.

Sao made his senior football debut for Le Havre on 2 August 2013, as a second half substitute in a 2–0 Ligue 2 defeat at AC Arles-Avignon.

In February 2015 Sao joined FC Sochaux-Montbéliard from Le Havre. After three and a half seasons with Sochaux, he signed for Red Star in Ligue 2 in July 2018. In July 2020 he signed with Laval. On 3 September 2021, he moved to Toulon.
