= Julien Fabri =

French footballer (born 1994)

Personal information
- Date of birth: 5 February 1994 (age 32)
- Place of birth: Marseille, France
- Height: 1.83 m (6 ft 0 in)
- Position: Goalkeeper

Team information
- Current team: Furiani-Agliani

Youth career
- AS Mazargues
- 2005–2015: Marseille

Senior career*
Years	Team	Apps	(Gls)
2012–2017	Marseille	0	(0)
2015–2017	→ Bourg-Péronnas (loan)	65	(0)
2017–2019	Brest	2	(0)
2019–2021	Châteauroux	31	(0)
2022–2026	Bastia	4	(0)
2026–	Furiani-Agliani	0	(0)
- * Club domestic league appearances and goals as of 9 May 2026

Julien Fabri (born 5 February 1994) is a French professional footballer who plays as a goalkeeper for Championnat National 1 club Furiani-Agliani.

== Career ==
Fabri signed for his boyhood club, Marseille, at the age of eleven as a youth player. On 8 July 2014, after nine years with the academy, he signed professional terms with Marseille. On 21 July 2015, it was announced that he signed a contract extension with Marseille and would go on loan to newly promoted Ligue 2 side, Bourg-Péronnas. He made his professional debut for the club on 11 August 2015 against Brest in the Coupe de la Ligue playing the full-match as Bourg-Péronnas won on penalties.

On 30 October 2019, Fabri signed a two-year contract with Châteauroux.

Fabri did not play in the 2021–22 season. On 23 May 2022, he signed a two-year contract with Bastia.

== Career statistics ==
As of 10 May 2024

Appearances and goals by club, season and competition
Club	Season	League			National cup		League cup		Other		Total	
Club	Season	Division	Apps	Goals	Apps	Goals	Apps	Goals	Apps	Goals	Apps	Goals
Bourg-Péronnas (loan)	2015–16	Ligue 2	30	0	0	0	2	0	—		32	0
Bourg-Péronnas (loan)	2016–17	Ligue 2	35	0	0	0	0	0	—		35	0
Bourg-Péronnas (loan)	Total		65	0	0	0	2	0	—		67	0
Brest	2017–18	Ligue 2	2	0	1	0	0	0	0	0	3	0
Brest	2018–19	Ligue 2	0	0	0	0	0	0	—		0	0
Brest	2019–20	Ligue 1	0	0	—		—		—		35	0
Brest	Total		2	0	1	0	0	0	0	0	3	0
Châteauroux	2019–20	Ligue 2	15	0	1	0	0	0	—		16	0
Châteauroux	2020–21	Ligue 2	16	0	1	0	—		—		17	0
Châteauroux	Total		31	0	2	0	0	0	—		33	0
Bastia	2022–23	Ligue 2	0	0	0	0	—		—		0	0
Bastia	2023–24	Ligue 2	4	0	1	0	—		—		5	0
Bastia	Total		4	0	1	0	—		—		5	0
Career total			102	0	4	0	2	0	0	0	108	0
