= Michy Batshuayi =

Belgian footballer (born 1993)

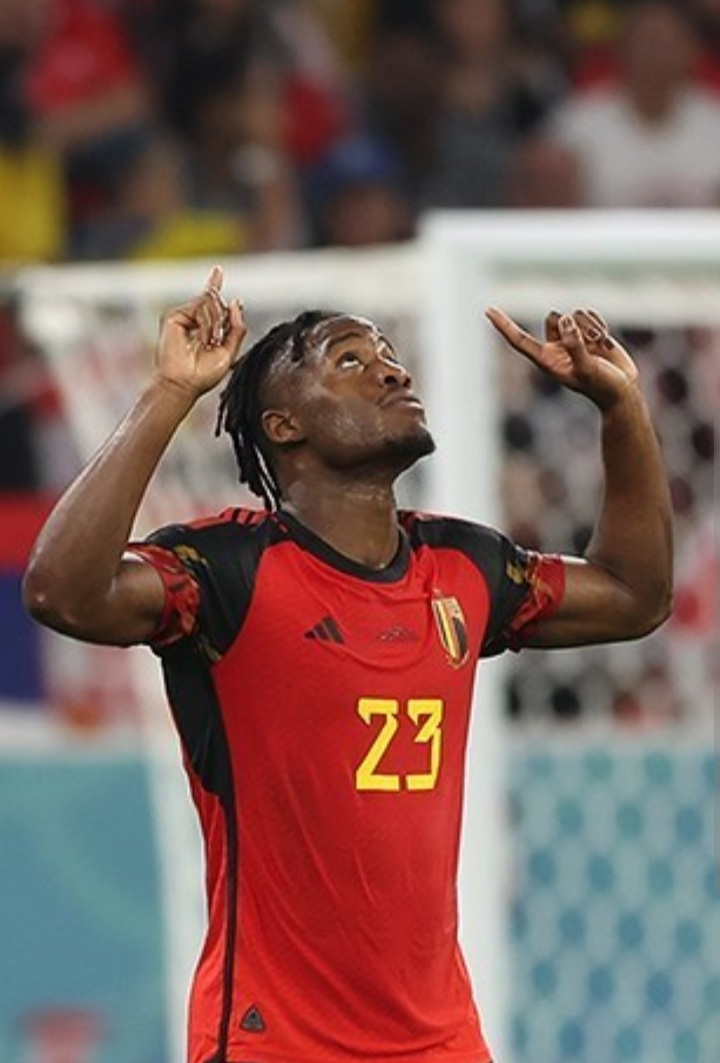
- Batshuayi with Belgium at the 2022 FIFA World Cup

Personal information
- Full name: Michy Batshuayi-Atunga
- Date of birth: 2 October 1993 (age 33)
- Place of birth: Brussels, Belgium
- Height: 1.85 m (6 ft 1 in)
- Position: Striker

Team information
- Current team: Abha
- Number: 44

Youth career
- 2006–2007: Brussels
- 2007–2008: Anderlecht
- 2008–2009: Brussels
- 2009–2011: Standard Liège

Senior career*
Years	Team	Apps	(Gls)
2011–2014	Standard Liège	97	(39)
2014–2016	Marseille	62	(29)
2016–2022	Chelsea	48	(8)
2018	→ Borussia Dortmund (loan)	10	(7)
2018–2019	→ Valencia (loan)	15	(1)
2019	→ Crystal Palace (loan)	11	(5)
2020–2021	→ Crystal Palace (loan)	18	(2)
2021–2022	→ Beşiktaş (loan)	33	(14)
2022–2024	Fenerbahçe	46	(24)
2024–2025	Galatasaray	18	(5)
2025–2026	Eintracht Frankfurt	16	(4)
2026–	Abha	4	(1)

International career
2012–2014	Belgium U21	13	(7)
2015–2024	Belgium	55	(27)
Medal record
Men's football
Representing Belgium
FIFA World Cup
Third place	2018 Russia
- * Club domestic league appearances and goals as of 23:19, 4 September 2026 (UTC)

Michy Batshuayi-Atunga (born 2 October 1993) is a Belgian professional footballer who plays as a striker for Saudi Pro League club Abha. He played for the Belgium national team from 2015 to 2024.

Batshuayi began his professional career at Standard Liège in 2011, scoring 44 goals in 120 games across all competitions. His 21 goals in the 2013–14 Belgian Pro League made him the second-highest scorer and contributed to his Ebony Shoe Award. He then transferred to Marseille for £4.5 million, helping them reach the 2016 Coupe de France final. In July 2016, he was signed by Chelsea for £33 million, and scored the goal that won the Premier League title in his debut season. After loans at Borussia Dortmund, Valencia, Crystal Palace and Beşiktaş, he joined Fenerbahçe in 2022.

Batshuayi scored in his international debut for Belgium against Cyprus in March 2015. He was part of their side that finished in third place at the 2018 FIFA World Cup, also playing at the 2022 World Cup and the UEFA European Championships of 2016 and 2020.

== Club career ==
=== Standard Liège ===
Born in Brussels to Congolese parents, Batshuayi had a nomadic youth career with spells at Evere, Schaarbeek, Brussels (twice) and Anderlecht before he joined Standard Liège. Batshuayi made his debut for the senior team on 20 February 2011 in a 4–1 loss away to Gent, replacing Franck Berrier for the last seven minutes. Six days later, he made his only other appearance of the Belgian Pro League season, filling in for Aloys Nong in the last minute of a 3–0 victory against KV Mechelen at the Stade Maurice Dufrasne.

On 21 July, Batshuayi was an unused substitute in the 2011 Belgian Super Cup, a 1–0 loss to Gent. On 15 December, he scored his first professional goal, the only one away to Copenhagen in the last match of Group B during the 2011–12 UEFA Europa League group stage, advancing his team into the knockout stages. Six days later, he added two more in a 2–1 win at Lierse in the quarter-final first leg of the Belgian Cup, although his side lost 5–4 on aggregate. He scored his first league goal on 14 January 2012 to round off a 6–1 home win over Germinal Beerschot, and ended the campaign with six. He was sent-off as a substitute in a 3–2 loss at Genk on 22 April for stamping on the chest of Jeroen Simaeys, for which the Royal Belgian Football Association suspended him for four matches.

Batshuayi was again sent-off on 25 September 2012 in a 3–2 win at Mouscron in the sixth round of the Belgian Cup, having elbowed Benjamin Delacourt within the first half-hour; he was suspended for the next two matches of the competition and fined €200. In an interview a month later, he said he felt "destroyed" by the suspension. He recorded 12 goals in 26 matches over the campaign, including two on 19 May 2013 to decide a 4–3 home win over Lokeren.

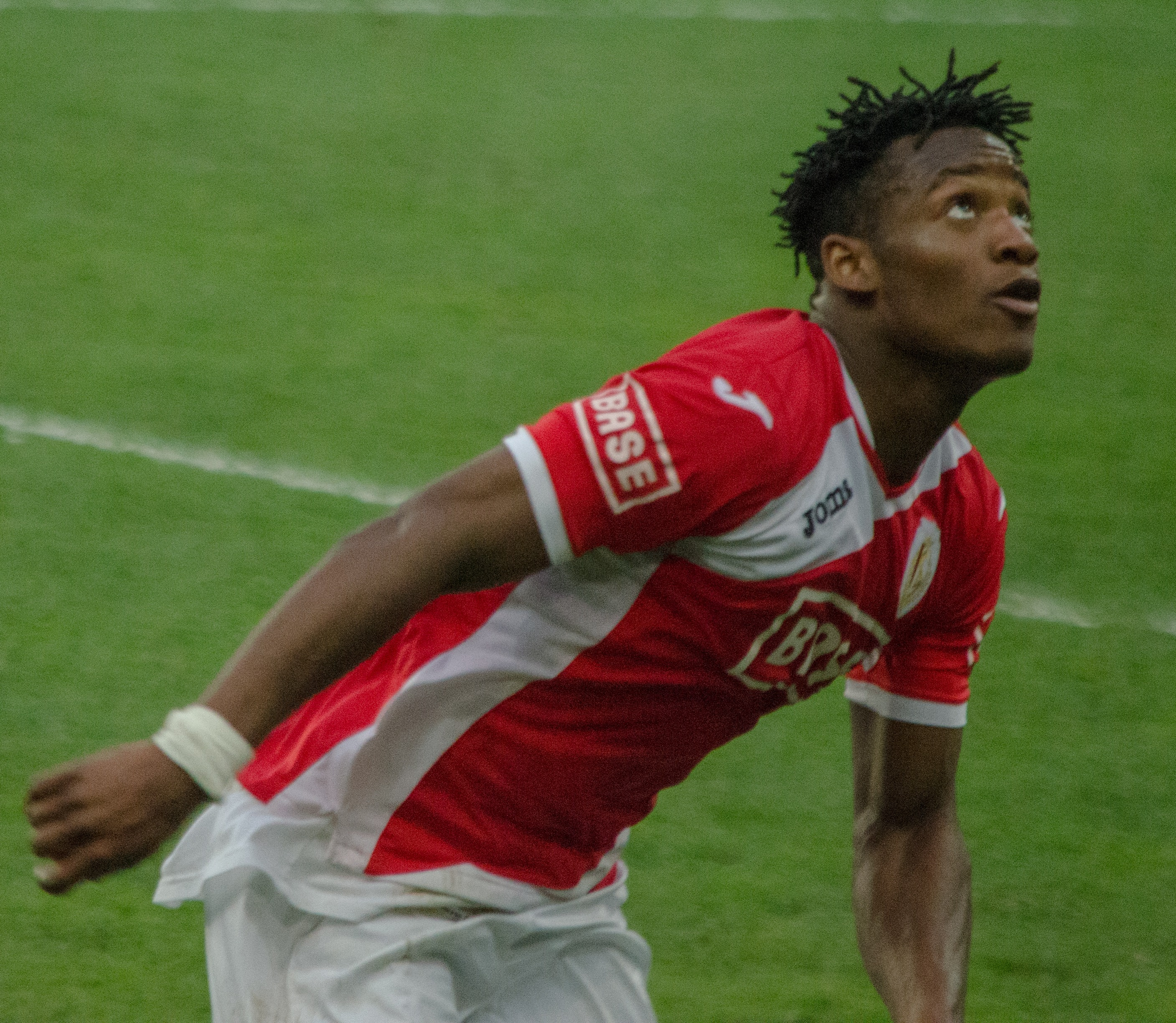
Batshuayi playing for Standard Liège during a match in March 2014

In the 2013–14 season, Batshuayi scored 21 goals in 34 matches, putting him in second place for the league's top scorer behind Lokeren's Hamdi Harbaoui. This tally included a first professional hat-trick on 15 September in a 4–2 win at Oostende. He was awarded the Ebony Shoe Award for the season's best player of African origin, ahead of Harbaoui.

=== Marseille ===
On 8 August 2014, Batshuayi signed with French club Marseille for a £4.5 million transfer fee. He made his debut the next day as Marseille began the Ligue 1 season with a 3–3 draw at Bastia, replacing Dimitri Payet with 11 minutes remaining. On 29 October, he scored his first goal for the club to open a 2–1 defeat at Rennes in the third round of the Coupe de la Ligue. He scored nine league goals for Marcelo Bielsa's team, despite rarely starting matches. On 22 February 2015, within five minutes of coming on for André-Pierre Gignac, he scored twice away to Saint-Étienne in an eventual 2–2 draw. In March, he added further braces in away victories at Toulouse and Lens (6–1 and 4–0 respectively), the latter after taking Gignac's place at half-time.

On 23 August 2015, Batshuayi scored his first goals of the season, a brace, in a 6–0 victory over Troyes. Soon after, club president Vincent Lebrune said, "There is not a single top 15 world club that is not interested in Batshuayi. He is one of the most wanted players on the market. There were a lot of offers for him this summer, but he didn't want to leave. He's proving himself on the pitch, and if clubs want him then they are going to have to pay around €50m." By the mid-season break, he had 11 goals from 19 matches, behind only arch-rival Paris Saint-Germain's Zlatan Ibrahimović, with Marseille in tenth in the league table and PSG in first. Batshuayi finished the league season with 17 goals. He added two more goals from five games in the Coupe de France, one being in the final, where Marseille lost 4–2 to PSG on 21 May 2016.

=== Chelsea ===
==== 2016–17 season ====
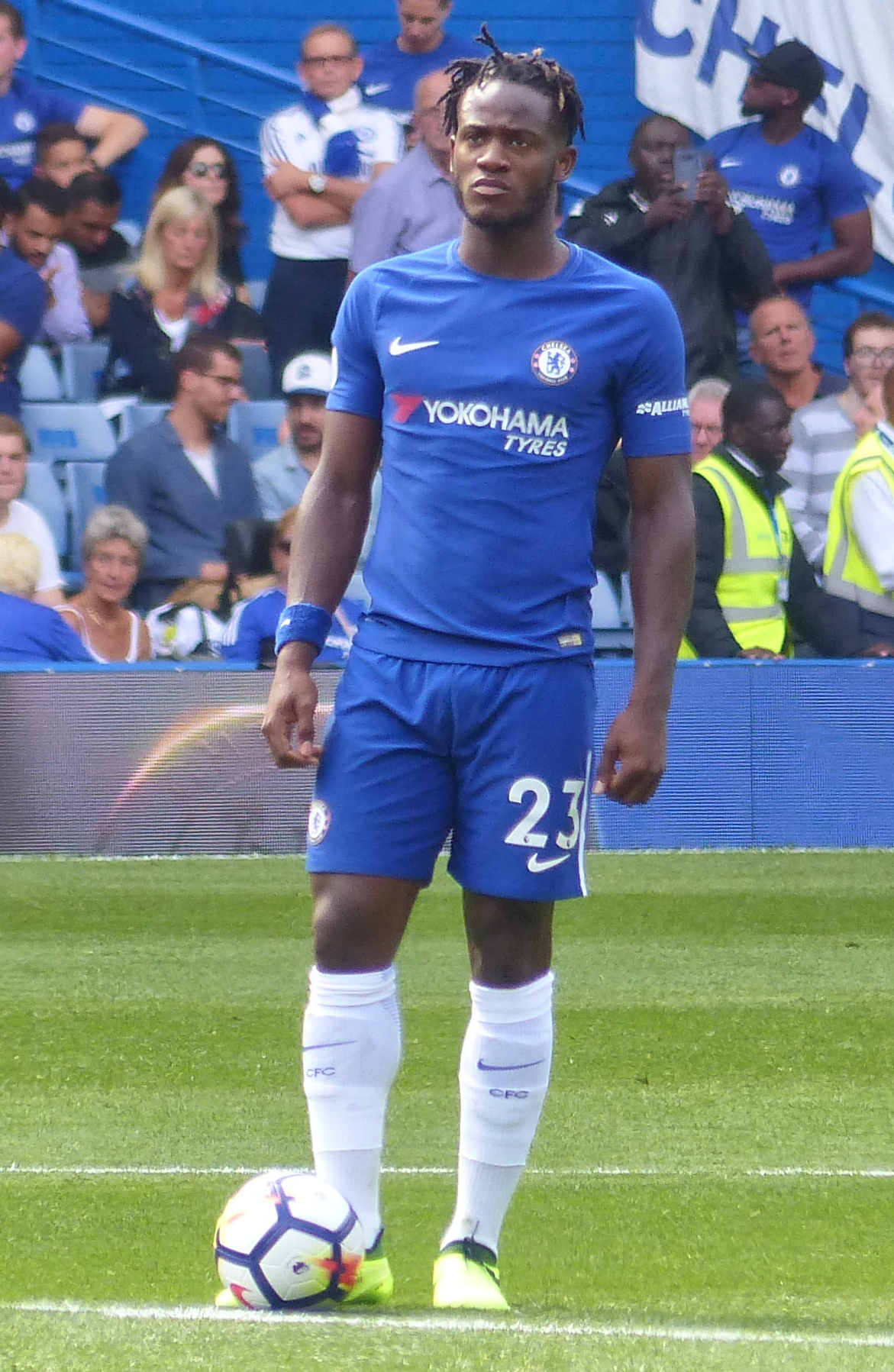
Batshuayi in action against Burnley in August 2017

In April 2016, English Premier League club West Ham United were reported as the favourites to sign Batshuayi, having offered a €35 million bid. Two months later, their London neighbours Crystal Palace made a €38 million (£31.5 million) bid which would have made him their record signing, while Italian champions Juventus were also among the interested parties. Although Palace's bid was accepted, Batshuayi did not want to make the move, instead engaging with a €40 million (£33.2 million) offer from Chelsea, for which he left Belgium's UEFA Euro 2016 squad to undergo a medical.

On 3 July, he signed a five-year deal at Chelsea. He was the first signing by their new manager Antonio Conte, and said his aim was to get the team back to winning the Premier League and qualifying for the UEFA Champions League. Batshuayi added he was eager to work alongside their midfielder Oscar. Batshuayi joined Chelsea for pre-season in Austria, and on 20 July, he made his debut in a friendly against Wolfsberger AC. A day later, he scored his first two goals in an 8–0 friendly victory against Atus Ferlach.

On 15 August, Batshuayi made his competitive debut in Chelsea's opening match of the 2016–17 season, coming off the substitutes' bench to set-up Diego Costa's late winner in a 2–1 win over West Ham. Five days later, after replacing Oscar, he went on to score his first Premier League goal in a victory by the same score at Watford. On 23 August, Batshuayi made his first start for Chelsea in the EFL Cup, scoring a brace in a 3–2 home victory against Bristol Rovers.

On 12 May, Batshuayi came on as a second-half substitute against West Bromwich Albion with the score 0–0, with Chelsea needing a victory to clinch the Premier League title. In the 82nd minute, he slotted a goal past goalkeeper Ben Foster to win Chelsea their fifth Premier League title. Batshuayi went on to score three goals in Chelsea's final two matches, including the last goal of the season in the 92nd minute of Chelsea's 5–1 win over Sunderland at Stamford Bridge. Batshuayi finished the season with 5 goals in only 236 minutes of Premier League action, equaling a rate of one goal every 47 minutes.

==== 2017–18 season ====
Batshuayi scored his first Chelsea hat-trick on 20 September 2017 in a 5–1 home win over Nottingham Forest in the third round of the EFL Cup. In a Champions League group stage match away to Atlético Madrid a week later, substitute Batshuayi scored the added-time winning goal in a 2–1 victory. On 17 January 2018, he scored in a third-round FA Cup win over Norwich City on his 50th appearance for Chelsea. The match finished 1–1 after extra time, with the Blues going on to win 5–3 on penalties.

==== Loan to Borussia Dortmund ====
On 31 January 2018, Batshuayi joined German Bundesliga club Borussia Dortmund on loan for the remainder of the 2017–18 season. His debut came on 2 February away to 1. FC Köln, where he scored twice and had a third disallowed via the video assistant referee, as he was in an offside position. He also made an assist. The match ended 3–2 to Dortmund as an away victory. Batshuayi became the first player to score multiple goals on his Bundesliga debut since the player he replaced at Dortmund, Pierre-Emerick Aubameyang. The following week, on matchday 22, he again scored the opening goal against Hamburger SV as Dortmund won 2–0.

On 15 February, he scored twice against Atalanta in the round of 32 first leg of the 2017–18 UEFA Europa League as Dortmund won 3–2 and took the lead going into the second leg. Dortmund's draw in Italy meant the club progressed to the round of 16, although Batshuayi reported hearing "monkey noises" during the match. In March, UEFA's investigation led to both teams being fined for use of pyrotechnics and other crowd disturbances, but Batshuayi's allegations of racism were dismissed. He criticised European football's governing body for their judgement. In a 2–0 loss to Schalke 04 on 15 April, Batshuayi injured his ankle ligaments and was ruled out for the remainder of the season.

==== Loan to Valencia ====
On 10 August 2018, Batshuayi was loaned to Spanish La Liga club Valencia for the 2018–19 season. Ten days later, he made his Liga debut as a 76th-minute substitute for Carlos Soler in a 1–1 home draw with Atlético Madrid, then continued that role in subsequent matches in a side possessing Rodrigo, Santi Mina and Kevin Gameiro as striking options. On 26 September, he scored his first goal in a 1–1 draw with Celta de Vigo, therefore becoming the first player to score in the top leagues of France, Germany, England and Spain in the 21st century.

==== Loans to Crystal Palace ====
In January 2019, Batshuayi's loan to Valencia was cut short and he joined English Premier League club Crystal Palace on loan until the end of the 2018–19 season. He made his debut on 2 February in a home 2–0 win against Fulham, providing an assist for Jeffrey Schlupp to score the second goal. On 23 February, Batshuayi scored for Crystal Palace in 4–1 win against Leicester City.

On 23 October 2019, Batshuayi came off the bench to score a late 1–0 winner for Chelsea, in their first Champions League meeting with Ajax at Johan Cruyff Arena. He scored the opener in a 2–1 away win over Hull City in the fourth round of the FA Cup on 25 January.

On 10 September 2020, Batshuayi returned to Crystal Palace for his second loan until the end of the 2020–21 season. On 18 October in the game against Brighton & Hove Albion, he won a penalty which was converted by Wilfried Zaha in the 1–1 draw against their rivals.

==== Loan to Beşiktaş ====
On 18 August 2021, Batshuayi extended his contract at Chelsea until 2023 and joined Beşiktaş on loan for the 2021–22 season. He was the Süper Lig's joint-seventh top scorer with 14 goals in 33 games, and won the Turkish Super Cup on 5 January 2022 by scoring in the penalty shootout after the 1–1 draw with Antalyaspor at the Ahmad bin Ali Stadium in Qatar.

=== Fenerbahçe ===
==== 2022–23 season ====
On 2 September 2022, Batshuayi remained in Istanbul by signing a two-year contract with the option for a third at Fenerbahçe. The transfer fee was reportedly €3 million; he was previously being pursued by newly promoted Premier League club Nottingham Forest, who offered to pay the final year of his Chelsea salary and take him on a free transfer. A month later, on 30 October, Batshuayi scored his first hat-trick in a 5–2 win at İstanbulspor, also providing an assist. On 11 June 2023, Batshuayi scored a brace in a 2–0 win in the Turkish Cup final against İstanbul Başakşehir.

==== 2023–24 season ====
On 1 August 2023, he scored a brace in the UEFA Conference League match against Zimbru at the Zimbru Stadium, Fenerbahçe won 4–0. Later that year, on 20 December, he scored his second hat-trick with the club in a 4–3 away win at Kayserispor in Süper Lig. On 17 January 2024, he scored four goals against Adanaspor in Turkish Cup match, Fenerbahçe won 6–0.

=== Galatasaray ===
On 1 July 2024, Galatasaray announced that Batshuayi joined the club by signing a 3-year contract, becoming the first foreign player to play for all Big Three clubs in the Turkish Süper Lig.

=== Eintracht Frankfurt ===
On 3 February 2025, Batshuayi signed a two-and-a-half-year contract with Eintracht Frankfurt in Germany. He scored his first goal for the club during a 2–1 home loss against Union Berlin.

=== Abha ===
On 17 August 2026, it was announced that Batshuayi had joined Saudi Pro League side Abha on a free transfer.

== International career ==
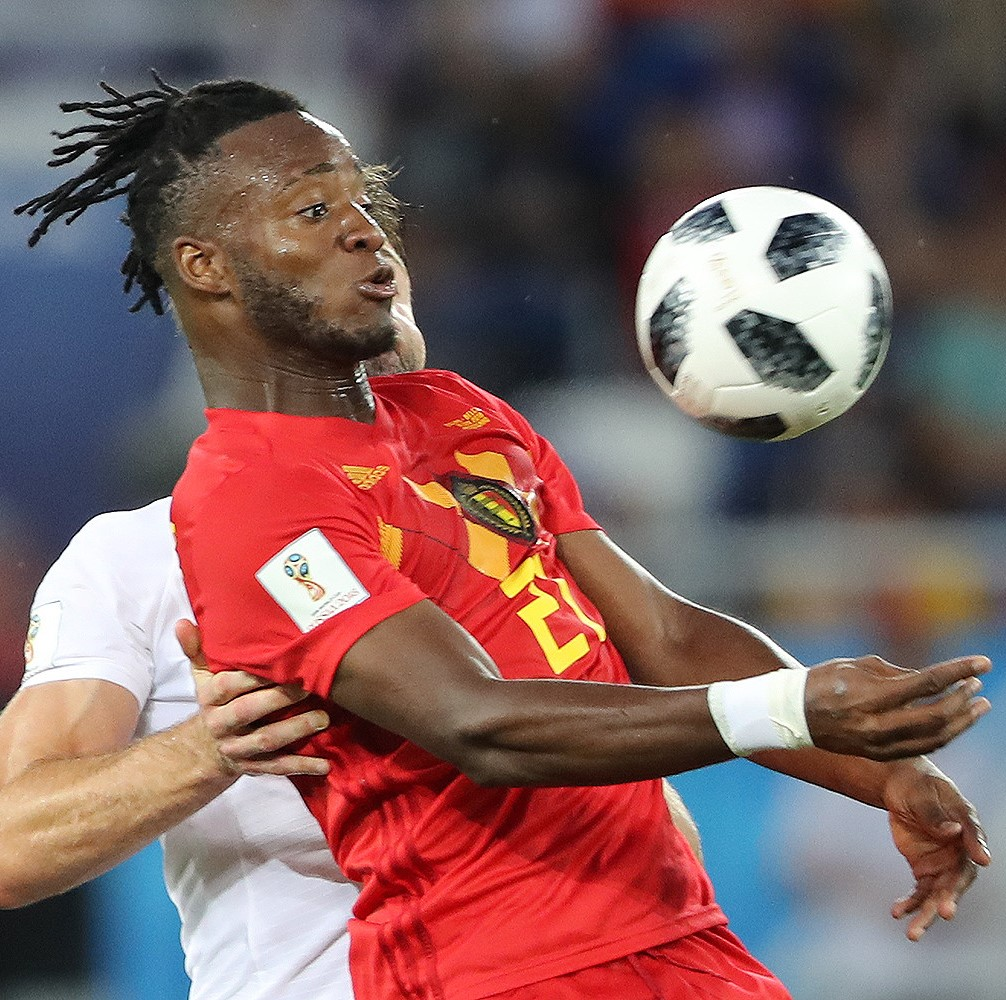
Batshuayi playing for Belgium at the 2018 FIFA World Cup

Batshuayi was eligible to play for the DR Congo national team through his parents, but in March 2015, he ruled out this option, stating that although his Congolese heritage is important to him, he would rather represent Belgium.

Batshuayi made his international debut for Belgium on 28 March 2015 in a UEFA Euro 2016 qualifying match against Cyprus. Replacing Christian Benteke in the 77th minute, he scored from outside the penalty area three minutes later to seal a 5–0 victory at home. He was selected for the final tournament in France, making his competition debut in the last 16 against Hungary in Toulouse on 26 June. With his first touch, he finished Eden Hazard's assist for the second goal of a 4–0 victory.

In Belgium's 2018 FIFA World Cup qualification, Batshuayi scored once in a 4–3 win away to Bosnia and Herzegovina on 7 October 2017, with the Red Devils already assured of their place in the final tournament. Manager Roberto Martínez named him in the 23-man squad to go to Russia. In their second group stage match, he came on as a 68th-minute substitute against Tunisia and missed several chances before finally scoring the fifth goal for Belgium in a 5–2 victory.

Despite a difficult club season, on 17 May 2021, Batshuayi was included in the final 26-man squad for the re-arranged UEFA Euro 2020. He was also called up for the 2022 FIFA World Cup in Qatar, scoring the only goal of the team's opener on 23 November against Canada; Belgium scored no further goals in a group stage elimination.

Despite a prolific club season with 24 goals, he was not included in Belgium's squad for the finals of UEFA Euro 2024.

== Style of play ==
A December 2015 profiling by FourFourTwo likened Batshuayi for his speed, strength, positioning and link-up play to Didier Drogba.

== Personal life ==
Batshuayi is nicknamed "Batsman" a play on the name of the superhero Batman. His younger brother Aaron Leya Iseka plays professional football in the same position, coming through at Anderlecht and signing for Marseille on loan, one month after Batshuayi's exit.

== Career statistics ==
=== Club ===
As of match played 4 September 2026

Appearances and goals by club, season and competition
Club	Season	League			National cup (Note: Includes Belgian Cup, Coupe de France, FA Cup, Copa del Rey, Turkish Cup, DFB-Pokal)		League cup (Note: Includes Coupe de la Ligue, EFL Cup)		Continental		Other		Total	
Club	Season	Division	Apps	Goals	Apps	Goals	Apps	Goals	Apps	Goals	Apps	Goals	Apps	Goals
Standard Liège	2010–11	Belgian Pro League	2	0	0	0	—		—		—		2	0
Standard Liège	2011–12	Belgian Pro League	23	6	2	2	—		8 (Note: One appearance in UEFA Champions League, seven appearances and one goal in UEFA Europa League)	1	0	0	33	9
Standard Liège	2012–13	Belgian Pro League	34	12	2	0	—		—		—		36	12
Standard Liège	2013–14	Belgian Pro League	38	21	1	0	—		10 (Note: Appearance(s) in UEFA Europa League)	2	—		49	23
Standard Liège	Total		97	39	5	2	—		18	3	0	0	120	44
Marseille	2014–15	Ligue 1	26	9	1	0	1	1	—		—		28	10
Marseille	2015–16	Ligue 1	36	17	5	2	2	0	7	4	—		50	23
Marseille	Total		62	26	6	2	3	1	7	4	—		78	33
Chelsea	2016–17	Premier League	20	5	5	2	3	2	—		—		28	9
Chelsea	2017–18	Premier League	12	2	3	3	5	3	4 (Note: Appearances in UEFA Champions League)	2	1 (Note: Appearance in FA Community Shield)	0	25	10
Chelsea	2019–20	Premier League	16	1	2	1	2	3	4	1	—		24	6
Chelsea	Total		48	8	10	6	10	8	8	3	1	0	77	25
Chelsea U23	2017–18	—			—		—		—		1 (Note: Appearance in EFL Trophy)	2	1	2
Borussia Dortmund (loan)	2017–18	Bundesliga	10	7	—		—		4	2	—		14	9
Valencia (loan)	2018–19	La Liga	15	1	3	1	—		5	1	—		23	3
Crystal Palace (loan)	2018–19	Premier League	11	5	2	1	—		—		—		13	6
Crystal Palace (loan)	2020–21	Premier League	18	2	1	0	1	0	—		—		20	2
Crystal Palace (loan)	Total		29	7	3	1	1	0	—		—		33	8
Beşiktaş (loan)	2021–22	Süper Lig	33	14	3	0	—		5	0	1 (Note: Appearance in Turkish Super Cup)	0	42	14
Fenerbahçe	2022–23	Süper Lig	19	12	5	5	—		8	3	—		32	20
Fenerbahçe	2023–24	Süper Lig	27	12	3	6	—		13 (Note: Appearances in UEFA Europa Conference League)	6	0	0	43	24
Fenerbahçe	Total		46	24	8	11	—		21	9	0	0	75	44
Galatasaray	2024–25	Süper Lig	18	5	1	0	—		10 (Note: Two appearances and two goals in UEFA Champions League, eight appearances in UEFA Europa League)	2	1	0	30	7
Eintracht Frankfurt	2024–25	Bundesliga	10	3	—		—		1	0	—		11	3
Eintracht Frankfurt	2025–26	Bundesliga	6	1	2	0	—		2	0	—		10	1
Eintracht Frankfurt	Total		16	3	2	0	—		3	0	—		21	4
Abha	2026–27	Saudi Pro League	4	1	0	0	—		—		—		4	1
Career total			378	135	41	23	14	9	81	24	4	2	518	194

=== International ===
Appearances and goals by national team and year
National team	Year	Apps	Goals
Belgium	2015	2	2
Belgium	2016	7	1
Belgium	2017	4	2
Belgium	2018	10	7
Belgium	2019	6	4
Belgium	2020	3	5
Belgium	2021	7	1
Belgium	2022	11	5
Belgium	2023	3	0
Belgium	2024	2	0
Total		55	27

As of match played 26 March 2024
Scores and results show Belgium's goal tally first, score column indicates score after each Batshuayi goal

International goals by date, venue, opponent, score, result and competition
No.	Date	Venue	Opponent	Score	Result	Competition
1	28 March 2015	King Baudouin Stadium, Brussels, Belgium	Cyprus	5–0	5–0	UEFA Euro 2016 qualifying
2	13 November 2015	King Baudouin Stadium, Brussels, Belgium	Italy	3–1	3–1	Friendly
3	26 June 2016	Stadium Municipal, Toulouse, France	Hungary	2–0	4–0	UEFA Euro 2016
4	5 June 2017	King Baudouin Stadium, Brussels, Belgium	Czech Republic	2–1	2–1	Friendly
5	7 October 2017	Stadion Grbavica, Sarajevo, Bosnia and Herzegovina	Bosnia and Herzegovina	2–2	4–3	2018 FIFA World Cup qualification
6	27 March 2018	King Baudouin Stadium, Brussels, Belgium	Saudi Arabia	3–0	4–0	Friendly
7	11 June 2018	King Baudouin Stadium, Brussels, Belgium	Costa Rica	4–1	4–1	Friendly
8	23 June 2018	Otkritie Arena, Moscow, Russia	Tunisia	5–1	5–2	2018 FIFA World Cup
9	7 September 2018	Hampden Park, Glasgow, Scotland	Scotland	3–0	4–0	Friendly
10	7 September 2018	Hampden Park, Glasgow, Scotland	Scotland	4–0	4–0	Friendly
11	15 November 2018	King Baudouin Stadium, Brussels, Belgium	Iceland	1–0	2–0	2018–19 UEFA Nations League A
12	15 November 2018	King Baudouin Stadium, Brussels, Belgium	Iceland	2–0	2–0	2018–19 UEFA Nations League A
13	24 March 2019	GSP Stadium, Nicosia, Cyprus	Cyprus	2–0	2–0	UEFA Euro 2020 qualifying
14	6 September 2019	San Marino Stadium, Serravalle, San Marino	San Marino	1–0	4–0	UEFA Euro 2020 qualifying
15	6 September 2019	San Marino Stadium, Serravalle, San Marino	San Marino	4–0	4–0	UEFA Euro 2020 qualifying
16	13 October 2019	Astana Arena, Nur-Sultan, Kazakhstan	Kazakhstan	1–0	2–0	UEFA Euro 2020 qualifying
17	8 September 2020	King Baudouin Stadium, Brussels, Belgium	Iceland	2–1	5–1	2020–21 UEFA Nations League A
18	8 September 2020	King Baudouin Stadium, Brussels, Belgium	Iceland	4–1	5–1	2020–21 UEFA Nations League A
19	8 October 2020	King Baudouin Stadium, Brussels, Belgium	Ivory Coast	1–0	1–1	Friendly
20	11 November 2020	Den Dreef, Leuven, Belgium	Switzerland	1–1	2–1	Friendly
21	11 November 2020	Den Dreef, Leuven, Belgium	Switzerland	2–1	2–1	Friendly
22	30 March 2021	Den Dreef, Leuven, Belgium	Belarus	1–0	8–0	2022 FIFA World Cup qualification
23	26 March 2022	Aviva Stadium, Dublin, Ireland	Republic of Ireland	1–0	2–2	Friendly
24	3 June 2022	King Baudouin Stadium, Brussels, Belgium	Netherlands	1–4	1–4	2022–23 UEFA Nations League A
25	14 June 2022	Stadion Narodowy, Warsaw, Poland	Poland	1–0	1–0	2022–23 UEFA Nations League A
26	22 September 2022	King Baudouin Stadium, Brussels, Belgium	Wales	2–0	2–1	2022–23 UEFA Nations League A
27	23 November 2022	Ahmad bin Ali Stadium, Al Rayyan, Qatar	Canada	1–0	1–0	2022 FIFA World Cup

== Honours ==
Chelsea

- Premier League: 2016–17
- FA Cup runner-up: 2016–17

Beşiktaş

- Turkish Super Cup: 2021

Fenerbahçe

- Turkish Cup: 2022–23

Galatasaray

- Süper Lig: 2024–25

Individual

- UNFP Ligue 1 Player of the Month: October 2015
- Bundesliga Team of the Season: 2017–18
