= 2014–15 Olympique de Marseille season =

Olympique de Marseille
2014–15 season
- President: Vincent Labrune
- Manager: Marcelo Bielsa
- Stadium: Stade Vélodrome
- Ligue 1: 4th
- Coupe de France: Round of 64
- Coupe de la Ligue: Round of 32
- Top goalscorer: League: André-Pierre Gignac (21); All: André-Pierre Gignac (23)
- Highest home attendance: 65,148 v Paris Saint-Germain – 5 April 2015
- Lowest home attendance: 39,497 v Nice – 29 August 2014
- Average home league attendance: 52,917
Home colours	Away colours	Third colours

The 2014–15 Olympique de Marseille season was the 65th professional season of the club since its creation in 1899 and 19th consecutive season in the top flight.

This was the first season in ten years that Marseille did not participate in the UEFA Champions League or UEFA Europa League, having finished sixth in the 2013–14 Ligue 1 season. The club was coached by legendary Argentine tactician Marcelo Bielsa, who signed a two-year contract in May 2014.

This was also the first season in which the side played at the renovated Stade Vélodrome, with the stadium having completed renovations which took place over the last three years. Capacity went up to 67,000 – from 48,000 last season, and 42,000 the season before. The stadium is rated five-star by UEFA, and was used ahead for the UEFA Euro 2016.

== Players ==
French teams are limited to four players without EU citizenship. Hence, the squad list includes only the principal nationality of each player; several non-European players on the squad have dual citizenship with an EU country. Also, players from the ACP countries—countries in Africa, the Caribbean, and the Pacific that are signatories to the Cotonou Agreement—are not counted against non-EU quotas due to the Kolpak ruling.

=== Current squad ===
As of 15 July 2014.

Note: Flags indicate national team as defined under FIFA eligibility rules; some limited exceptions apply. Players may hold more than one non-FIFA nationality.

No.	Pos.	Nation	Player
2	DF	FRA	Baptiste Aloé
3	DF	CMR	Nicolas N'Koulou
4	DF	BRA	Dória
5	DF	FRA	Stéphane Sparagna
6	MF	SEN	Momar Bangoura
7	MF	FRA	Benoît Cheyrou
8	MF	FRA	Mario Lemina
9	FW	FRA	André-Pierre Gignac
10	MF	GHA	André Ayew
11	MF	FRA	Romain Alessandrini
14	MF	FRA	Florian Thauvin
15	DF	FRA	Jérémy Morel
16	GK	CGO	Brice Samba

No.	Pos.	Nation	Player
17	MF	FRA	Dimitri Payet
20	MF	TOG	Alaixys Romao
22	FW	BEL	Michy Batshuayi
23	DF	FRA	Benjamin Mendy
24	DF	FRA	Rod Fanni
25	MF	FRA	Gianelli Imbula
26	DF	CIV	Brice Dja Djédjé
27	MF	MAR	Abdelaziz Barrada
29	FW	FRA	Jérémie Porsan-Clemente
30	GK	FRA	Steve Mandanda (captain)
40	GK	FRA	Julien Fabri
--	DF	BRA	Alef
--	MF	FRA	Maxime Lopez

=== Coaching staff ===
Manager	Marcelo Bielsa
Assistant Coaches	Diego Reyes, Pablo Quiroga, Javier Torrente, Diego Torrente, Ever Demalde
Goalkeeping Coach	Stephane Cassard
Physical coaches	Jan Van Winckel (head of strength and conditioning), Frederic Faure
Head Doctor	Christophe Baudot, Sylvain Blanchard
Physiotherapists	Alain Soultanian, Jérôme Palestri, Jean-Georges Cellier

Source: LFP.fr

=== Transfers ===
The club made their first transfer of the season in June when they signed Belgian striker Michy Batshuayi for a rumoured €8 million from Standard Liège. The club then signed Romain Alessandrini, the Marseille-born Rennes winger for €5 million a few days later.

So far, Larry Azouni has been transferred to Nîmes and Florian Raspentino has departed to Caen.

=== In ===
Date	Pos.	Player	Age	Moving from	Fee	Notes
23 June 2014	FW	(Belgium) Michy Batshuayi	20	(Belgium) Standard Liège	€8,000,000	
25 June 2014	MF	(France) Romain Alessandrini	25	(France) Rennes	€5,000,000	

=== Out ===
Date	Pos.	Player	Age	Moving to	Fee	Notes
10 July 2014	MF	(France) Larry Azouni	20	(France) Nîmes	Free	
11 July 2014	MF	(France) Florian Raspentino	25	(France) Caen	Undisclosed	

== Competitions ==
=== Pre-season and friendlies ===
19 July 2014	Bayer Leverkusen	1–4	Marseille	Seekirchen am Wallersee, Austria
19:00 CEST	Yurchenko 79'	Report	Thauvin 34'; Batshuayi 57'; Amalfitano 78'; Payet 80'	Stadium: Stadion Seekirchen

23 July 2014	Marseille	2–1	Benfica	Clermont-Ferrand, France
19:00 CEST	Gignac 21'; Batshuayi 56'	Report	Gaitán 13'	Stadium: Stade Gabriel Montpied

27 July 2014	Marseille	5–0	Willem II	Albertville, France
19:00 CEST	Thauvin 21'; Imbula 25'; Batshuayi 54' 90'; Cheyrou 81'	Report		Stadium: L'anneau de vitesse Attendance: 3,000

30 July 2014	Bari	1–1	Marseille	Bari, Italy
19:00 CEST	Sabelli 62'	Report	Batshuayi 82'	Stadium: Stadio San Nicola

2 August 2014	Marseille	3–1	Chievo	Le Pontet, France
20:00 CEST	Thauvin 17'; N'Koulou 49'; Gignac 73'	Report	Bentivoglio 46'	Stadium: Stade de Fargues

14 November 2014	Espanyol	2–1	Marseille	Barcelona, Spain
15:00 CEST	Caicedo 17' (pen.); Sánchez 83'	Report	Aloé 85'	Stadium: Estadi Cornellà-El Prat

=== Ligue 1 ===
==== League table ====
Pos	Team	Pld	W	D	L	GF	GA	GD	Pts	Qualification or relegation
2	Lyon	38	22	9	7	72	33	+39	75	Qualification for the Champions League group stage
3	Monaco	38	20	11	7	51	26	+25	71	Qualification for the Champions League third qualifying round
4	Marseille	38	21	6	11	76	42	+34	69	Qualification for the Europa League group stage
5	Saint-Étienne	38	19	12	7	51	30	+21	69	Qualification for the Europa League third qualifying round (Note: Since winners of the 2014–15 Coupe de la Ligue, Paris Saint-Germain, qualified for European competition based on their league position, the spot awarded to the Coupe de la Ligue winner (Europa League third qualifying round) is passed to the next best team in the table not already qualified for any European competition (in this case, the fifth-placed team).)
6	Bordeaux	38	17	12	9	47	44	+3	63	Qualification for the Europa League third qualifying round

Source: Ligue 1
Rules for classification: 1) points; 2) goal difference; 3) number of goals scored

==== Results summary ====
Overall								Home						Away					
Pld	W	D	L	GF	GA	GD	Pts	W	D	L	GF	GA	GD	W	D	L	GF	GA	GD
38	21	6	11	76	42	+34	69	13	2	4	40	22	+18	8	4	7	36	20	+16

Last updated: 5 June 2015.
Source: Competitive matches

==== Results by round ====
Round	1	2	3	4	5	6	7	8	9	10	11	12	13	14	15	16	17	18	19	20	21	22	23	24	25	26	27	28	29	30	31	32	33	34	35	36	37	38
Ground	A	H	A	H	A	H	A	H	A	H	A	H	A	H	H	A	H	A	H	A	H	A	H	A	H	A	H	A	H	A	H	A	A	H	A	H	A	H
Result	D	L	W	W	W	W	W	W	W	W	L	W	L	W	W	D	W	L	W	L	W	L	W	D	D	D	L	W	D	W	L	L	L	L	W	W	W	W
Position	8	15	10	4	2	1	1	1	1	1	1	1	1	1	1	1	1	1	1	2	2	2	2	2	2	3	3	3	3	3	3	4	4	5	4	4	4	4

Source: Ligue 1
A = Away; H = Home; W = Win; D = Draw; L = Loss

==== Matches ====
Win Draw Loss

9 August 2014 1	Bastia	3–3	Marseille	Bastia
21:00 CEST (UTC+02:00)	Maboulou 9', 73'; Palmieri (yellow card) 19'; Tallo 66' (pen.); Brandão (yellow card) 82'; Ayité (yellow card) 87'	Report	Gignac 11', 62'; Romaric 17' (o.g.); Mendy (yellow card) 64'	Stadium: Stade Armand Cesari; Attendance: 15,537; Referee: Lionel Jaffredo

17 August 2014 2	Marseille	0–2	Montpellier	Marseille
17:00 CEST (UTC+02:00)	Dja Djédjé (yellow card) 58'	Report	Mounier 18'; Sanson 68'	Stadium: Stade Vélodrome; Attendance: 50,774; Referee: Clément Turpin

23 August 2014 3	Guingamp	0–1	Marseille	Guingamp
17:00 CEST (UTC+02:00)	Sorbon (yellow card) 90+2'	Report	Payet (yellow card) 29'; Gignac 46', (yellow card) 70'; Batshuayi (yellow card) 71'	Stadium: Stade du Roudourou; Attendance: 16,901; Referee: Benoît Millot

29 August 2014 4	Marseille	4–0	Nice	Marseille
20:30 CEST (UTC+02:00)	Payet 19', 48'; Thauvin 45'; Ayew (yellow card) 78'; Barrada 88'	Report	Amavi (yellow card) 31'; Diawara (yellow card) 45'	Stadium: Stade Vélodrome; Attendance: 39,497; Referee: Bartolomeu Varela

14 September 2014 5	Evian	1–3	Marseille	Annecy
21:00 CEST (UTC+02:00)	Mensah (yellow card) 23'; N'Sikulu 90+1'	Report	Gignac 1'; Mensah 44' (o.g.); Thauvin 63'	Stadium: Parc des Sports; Attendance: 12,967; Referee: Amaury Delerue

20 September 2014 6	Marseille	3–0	Rennes	Marseille
17:00 CEST (UTC+02:00)	Gignac 50', 63'; N'Koulou (yellow card) 65'; Alessandrini 90+4'	Report	Armand (yellow card) 90+3'	Stadium: Stade Vélodrome; Attendance: 46,153; Referee: Stéphane Lannoy

23 September 2014 7	Reims	0–5	Marseille	Reims
19:00 CEST (UTC+02:00)	Mavinga (yellow card) 7'	Report	Gignac 8', 20'; Morel (yellow card) 11'; Ayew 52', 59'; Imbula 74'	Stadium: Stade Auguste Delaune; Attendance: 17,705; Referee: Antony Gautier

28 September 2014 8	Marseille	2–1	Saint-Étienne	Marseille
21:00 CEST (UTC+02:00)	Imbula 7'; Payet 28'; N'Koulou (yellow card) 85'	Report	Mollo (yellow card) 51'; Brison 53'; Diomande (yellow card) 79'	Stadium: Stade Vélodrome; Attendance: 55,367; Referee: Fredy Fautrel

4 October 2014 9	Caen	1–2	Marseille	Caen
17:00 CEST (UTC+02:00)	Musavu-King 84'	Report	Morel (yellow card) 37'; Romao 74'; Gignac 90+3'	Stadium: Stade Michel d'Ornano; Attendance: 20,501; Referee: Benoît Millot

20 October 2014 10	Marseille	2–0	Toulouse	Marseille
14:00 CEST (UTC+02:00)	N'Koulou 20'; Gignac 35'; Romao (yellow card) 41'; Ayew (yellow card) 89'	Report	Aguilar (yellow card) 40'; Yago (yellow card) 41'; Akpa Akpro (yellow card) 73'	Stadium: Stade Vélodrome; Attendance: 61,846; Referee: Amaury Delerue

26 October 2014 11	Lyon	1–0	Marseille	Lyon
21:00 CEST (UTC+02:00)	Biševac (yellow card) 48'; Gourcuff 65'	Report	Morel (yellow card) 8'; Romao (yellow card) 21'; Ayew (yellow card) 74'	Stadium: Stade de Gerland; Attendance: 38,712; Referee: Lionel Jaffredo

2 November 2014 12	Marseille	2–1	Lens	Marseille
16:00 CET (UTC+01:00)	N'Koulou 11'; Romao (yellow card) 23' (yellow-red card) 76'; Thauvin 60'; Mendy (yellow card) 72'; Imbula (yellow card) 81'	Report	Guillaume 31'; Valdivia (yellow card) 79'	Stadium: Stade Vélodrome; Attendance: 52,803; Referee: Bartolomeu Varela

9 November 2014 13	Paris Saint-Germain	2–0	Marseille	Paris
21:00 CET (UTC+01:00)	Lucas 38'; Cavani 85'; Cabaye (yellow card) 90'	Report	Imbula (red card) 78'	Stadium: Parc des Princes; Attendance: 45,961; Referee: Clément Turpin

23 November 2014 14	Marseille	3–1	Bordeaux	Marseille
21:00 CET (UTC+01:00)	Lemina 60'; Gignac 85'; Batshuayi 90'	Report	Touré 55'; Yamberé (yellow card) 58'	Stadium: Stade Vélodrome; Attendance: 54,323; Referee: Antony Gautier

28 November 2014 15	Marseille	2–0	Nantes	Marseille
20:30 CET (UTC+01:00)	Thauvin 24', (yellow card) 31'; Fanni 39'	Report	Djilobodji (yellow card) 38'; Gomis (yellow card) 45'	Stadium: Stade Vélodrome; Attendance: 54,103; Referee: Ruddy Buquet

2 December 2014 16	Lorient	1–1	Marseille	Lorient
19:00 CET (UTC+01:00)	Ayew 37' (pen.)	Report	Payet 32'; Mandanda (yellow card) 36'	Stadium: Stade du Moustoir; Attendance: 16,011; Referee: Benoît Millot

7 December 2014 17	Marseille	3–1	Metz	Marseille
21:00 CET (UTC+01:00)	Gignac 43'; Ayew 59'; Payet 90+2'	Report	Malouda 46'; N'Daw (yellow card) 87'	Stadium: Stade Vélodrome; Attendance: 45,537; Referee: Wilfried Bien

14 December 2014 18	Monaco	1–0	Marseille	Fontvieille, Monaco
21:00 CET (UTC+01:00)	Moutinho (yellow card) 44'; Silva 67'; Raggi (yellow card) 86'; Ocampos (yellow card) 90+4'	Report	Lemina (yellow card) 45+1'; Mendy (yellow card) 74'	Stadium: Stade Louis II; Attendance: 12,648; Referee: Tony Chapron

21 December 2014 19	Marseille	2–1	Lille	Marseille
14:00 CET (UTC+01:00)	Roux 32' (o.g.); Batshuayi 69'; Romao (yellow card) 76'	Report	Gueye 61'; Frey (yellow card) 63'	Stadium: Stade Vélodrome; Attendance: 62,408; Referee: Alexandre Castro

9 January 2015 20	Montpellier	2–1	Marseille	Montpellier
20:30 CET (UTC+01:00)	Bérigaud 36'; Lasne 62'	Report	Mendy (yellow card) 18'; Omrani 68' (yellow card) 71'; Thauvin (yellow card) 78'	Stadium: Stade de la Mosson; Attendance: 20,840; Referee: Benoît Bastien

18 January 2015 21	Marseille	2–1	Guingamp	Marseille
21:00 CET (UTC+01:00)	Dja Djédjé (yellow card) 22'; Morel (yellow card) 72'; Lemina 85'; Gignac 89'; Fanni (red card) 90'	Report	Angoua (yellow card) 17'; Beauvue 90+1' (pen.)	Stadium: Stade Vélodrome; Attendance: 42,601; Referee: Wilfried Bien

24 January 2015 22	Nice	2–1	Marseille	Nice
20:30 CET (UTC+01:00)	Genevois 47'; Gomis (yellow card) 51' (yellow-red card) 53'; Pléa (yellow card) 53'; Hult 73'; Mendy (yellow card) 87'; Bauthéac (yellow card) 89'	Report	Aloé (yellow card) 36'; Imbula (yellow card) 59'; Dja Djédjé (yellow card) 64'; Thauvin 77'	Stadium: Allianz Riviera; Attendance: 25,407; Referee: Antony Gautier

31 January 2015 23	Marseille	1–0	Evian	Marseille
16:30 CET (UTC+01:00)	Gignac 49'	Report	Koné (yellow card) 28'; Fall (yellow card) 90+2'	Stadium: Stade Vélodrome; Attendance: 46,579; Referee: Frank Schneider

7 February 2015 24	Rennes	1–1	Marseille	Rennes
16:00 CET (UTC+01:00)	Toivonen 27', (yellow card) 83'; Pedro Henrique (yellow card) 39'	Report	Imbula (yellow card) 35'; Ocampos 60'; Morel (yellow card) 75'; Payet (yellow card) 83'; Lemina (red card) 83'	Stadium: Stade de la Route de Lorient; Attendance: 25,322; Referee: Amaury Delerue

13 February 2015 25	Marseille	2–2	Reims	Marseille
20:30 CET (UTC+01:00)	Thauvin (yellow card) 31'; Payet 58'; Ayew 69'	Report	De Préville 6'; Devaux (yellow card) 43'; Mandi (yellow card) 69'; Ngog 90'	Stadium: Stade Vélodrome; Attendance: 43,653; Referee: Philippe Kalt

22 February 2015 26	Saint-Étienne	2–2	Marseille	Saint-Étienne
21:00 CET (UTC+01:00)	Gradel 54' (pen.); Erdinç 90+1'; Mollo (yellow card) 90+2'	Report	Dja Djédjé (yellow card) 51'; Ocampos (yellow card) 59'; Batshuayi 64', 67'; Aloé (yellow card) 65'; Fanni (yellow card) 81'	Stadium: Stade Geoffroy-Guichard; Attendance: 35,651; Referee: Clément Turpin

28 February 2015 27	Marseille	2–3	Caen	Marseille
20:30 CET (UTC+01:00)	Dja Djédjé (yellow card) 22'; Ayew 45+3'; Gignac 63'	Report	Yahia (yellow card) 2'; Seube 67'; Sala 70'; Benezet 87'	Stadium: Stade Vélodrome; Attendance: 44,614; Referee: Sébastien Desiage

6 March 2015 28	Toulouse	1–6	Marseille	Toulouse
20:30 CET (UTC+01:00)	Ben Yedder 77'; Akpa Akpro (yellow card) 90+1'	Report	Batshuayi 2', 44'; Aloé 6'; Moubandje 20' (o.g.); Mandanda (yellow card) 35'; Ayew (yellow card) 62', (goal) 78'; Gignac 89'	Stadium: Stadium Municipal; Attendance: 19,000; Referee: Tony Chapron

15 March 2015 29	Marseille	0–0	Lyon	Marseille
21:00 CET (UTC+01:00)	Gignac (yellow card) 37'; Mendy (yellow card) 64'; Payet (yellow card) 84'; Morel (red card) 86'; Imbula (yellow card) 88'	Report	Ferri (yellow card) 25'; Rose (yellow card) 88'; Malbranque (yellow card) 90'	Stadium: Stade Vélodrome; Attendance: 62,832; Referee: Benoît Bastien

22 March 2015 30	Lens	0–4	Marseille	Saint-Denis
21:00 CET (UTC+01:00)	Valdivia (yellow card) 11'; Gbamin (yellow card) 35'; Lemoigne (yellow card) 66'	Report	Dja Djédjé (yellow card) 22'; Batshuayi 46', 67', 90+3'; Ayew 72'; Imbula (yellow card) 90'	Stadium: Stade de France; Attendance: 70,122; Referee: Fredy Fautrel

5 April 2015 31	Marseille	2–3	Paris Saint-Germain	Marseille
21:00 CEST (UTC+02:00)	Romao (yellow card) 9'; Fanni (yellow card) 23'; Gignac 30', 43'; Ayew (yellow card) 54' (yellow-red card) 90+6'	Report	Matuidi 35'; Pastore (yellow card) 45'; Marquinhos 49'; Morel 51' (o.g.); Verratti (yellow card) 65'	Stadium: Stade Vélodrome; Attendance: 65,148; Referee: Ruddy Buquet

12 April 2015 32	Bordeaux	1–0	Marseille	Bordeaux
21:00 CEST (UTC+02:00)	Khazri (yellow card) 55'; Plašil (yellow card) 56'; Yamberé 61'	Report	Mendy (yellow card) 36'	Stadium: Stade Chaban-Delmas; Attendance: 32,408; Referee: Bartolomeu Varela

18 April 2015 33	Nantes	1–0	Marseille	Nantes
20:30 CEST (UTC+02:00)	Gakpé 20'; Gomis (yellow card) 41'	Report	Morel (yellow card) 71'; N'Koulou (yellow card) 73'; Ayew (yellow card) 89'	Stadium: Stade de la Beaujoire; Attendance: 36,022; Referee: Stéphane Lannoy

25 April 2015 34	Marseille	3–5	Lorient	Marseille
20:30 CEST (UTC+02:00)	Romao (yellow card) 41'; A. Ayew 59'; Morel 67'; Batshuayi 76'	Report	J. Ayew 9', 84', (yellow card) 87'; Bellugou 14'; N'Dong (yellow card) 51'; Mostefa (yellow card) 62'; Philippoteaux 68'; Abdullah (yellow card) 75'; Gassama (yellow card) 90+3'	Stadium: Stade Vélodrome; Attendance: 55,180; Referee: Saïd Ennjimi

1 May 2015 35	Metz	0–2	Marseille	Metz
20:30 CEST (UTC+02:00)	Malouda (yellow card) 40'	Report	Gignac 38', 62', (yellow card) 56'; Lemina (yellow card) 52'; Ayew (yellow card) 57'	Stadium: Stade Saint-Symphorien; Attendance: 23,190; Referee: Benoît Millot

10 May 2015 36	Marseille	2–1	Monaco	Marseille
21:00 CEST (UTC+02:00)	N'Koulou (yellow card) 28'; Romao (yellow card) 74'; Ayew 79'; Mendy (yellow card) 74'; Alessandrini 87'	Report	Moutinho 1'; Carvalho (yellow card) 70'; Raggi (yellow card) 72'	Stadium: Stade Vélodrome; Attendance: 62,471; Referee: Clément Turpin

16 May 2015 37	Lille	0–4	Marseille	Villeneuve d'Ascq
21:00 CEST (UTC+02:00)	Balmont (yellow card) 28'; Corchia (yellow card) 39'	Report	Gignac 2'; Fanni 26'; Imbula (yellow card) 37'; Alessandrini (yellow card) 68' (goal) 70'; Ayew 76'; Mendy (yellow card) 81'	Stadium: Stade Pierre-Mauroy; Attendance: 44,286; Referee: Tony Chapron

23 May 2015 38	Marseille	3–0	Bastia	Marseille
21:00 CEST (UTC+02:00)	Payet 14'; Djiku 39' (o.g.); N'Koulou (yellow card) 76'; Ocampos 89'	Report	Diakité (yellow card) 34'	Stadium: Stade Vélodrome; Attendance: 59,533; Referee: Ruddy Buquet

=== Coupe de France ===
4 January 2015 Round of 64	Grenoble	3–3 (a.e.t.) (5–4 p)	Marseille	Grenoble
20:45 CET ((+01:00))	Nasrallah 10'; Hachi 48'; Bengriba 120'	Report	Gignac 6', 33'; Ayew 98'	Stadium: Stade des Alpes
	Penalties
	Giraudon (penalty scored); Joufreau (penalty scored); Akrour (penalty scored); Tchenkoua (penalty scored); Nasrallah (penalty scored)		(penalty scored) Ayew; (penalty scored) Batshuayi; (penalty scored) Payet; (penalty scored) Imbula; (penalty missed) Thauvin

=== Coupe de la Ligue ===
28 October 2014 Round of 32	Rennes	2–1	Marseille	Rennes
20:55 CEST (UTC+02:00)	Konradsen 60'; N'Koulou (yellow card) 43'; Barrada (yellow card) 48'; Ntep (red card) 63'; Habibou (yellow card) 72'; Hosiner 90+3'	Report	Batshuayi 19'; Dja Djédjé (red card) 63'	Stadium: Stade de la Route de Lorient; Attendance: 26,660; Referee: Saïd Ennjimi

== Statistics ==
=== Appearances and goals ===
No.	Pos	Nat	Player	Total		Ligue 1		Coupe de France		Coupe de la Ligue	
No.	Pos	Nat	Player	Apps	Goals	Apps	Goals	Apps	Goals	Apps	Goals
Goalkeepers
16	GK	(Republic of the Congo) CGO	Brice Samba	0	0	0	0	0	0	0	0
30	GK	(France) FRA	Steve Mandanda	38	0	38	0	0	0	0	0
Defenders
2	DF	(France) FRA	Baptiste Aloé	14	1	4+10	1	0	0	0	0
3	DF	(Cameroon) CMR	Nicolas N'Koulou	24	2	23+1	2	0	0	0	0
5	DF	(France) FRA	Stéphane Sparagna	4	0	1+3	0	0	0	0	0
12	DF	(France) FRA	Gaël Andonian	1	0	0+1	0	0	0	0	0
15	DF	(France) FRA	Jérémy Morel	31	1	30+1	1	0	0	0	0
18	DF	(New Zealand) NZL	Bill Tuiloma	2	0	0+2	0	0	0	0	0
23	DF	(France) FRA	Benjamin Mendy	33	0	33	0	0	0	0	0
24	DF	(France) FRA	Rod Fanni	27	2	24+3	2	0	0	0	0
26	DF	(Ivory Coast) CIV	Brice Dja Djédjé	33	0	33	0	0	0	0	0
Midfielders
6	MF	(Senegal) SEN	Momar Bangoura	0	0	0	0	0	0	0	0
7	MF	(Argentina) ARG	Lucas Ocampos	14	2	3+11	2	0	0	0	0
8	MF	(France) FRA	Mario Lemina	23	2	13+10	2	0	0	0	0
10	MF	(Ghana) GHA	André Ayew	28	10	27+1	10	0	0	0	0
11	MF	(France) FRA	Romain Alessandrini	26	3	13+13	3	0	0	0	0
14	MF	(France) FRA	Florian Thauvin	36	5	32+4	5	0	0	0	0
17	MF	(France) FRA	Dimitri Payet	36	7	35+1	7	0	0	0	0
20	MF	(Togo) TOG	Alaixys Romao	32	2	27+5	2	0	0	0	0
25	MF	(France) FRA	Giannelli Imbula	37	2	37	2	0	0	0	0
27	MF	(Morocco) MAR	Abdelaziz Barrada	9	1	3+6	1	0	0	0	0
33	MF	(France) FRA	Bilal Boutobba	3	0	0+3	0	0	0	0	0
Forwards
9	FW	(France) FRA	André-Pierre Gignac	38	21	36+2	21	0	0	0	0
19	FW	(France) FRA	Billel Omrani	4	1	0+4	1	0	0	0	0
22	FW	(Belgium) BEL	Michy Batshuayi	26	9	6+20	9	0	0	0	0
29	FW	(France) FRA	Jérémie Porsan-Clémenté	1	0	0+1	0	0	0	0	0
Players transferred out during the season
4	DF	(Brazil) BRA	Dória	0	0	0	0	0	0	0	0
7	MF	(France) FRA	Benoît Cheyrou	0	0	0	0	0	0	0	0

Last updated: 30 May 2015
Source: BDFutbol
