= Romain Alessandrini =

French footballer (born 1989)

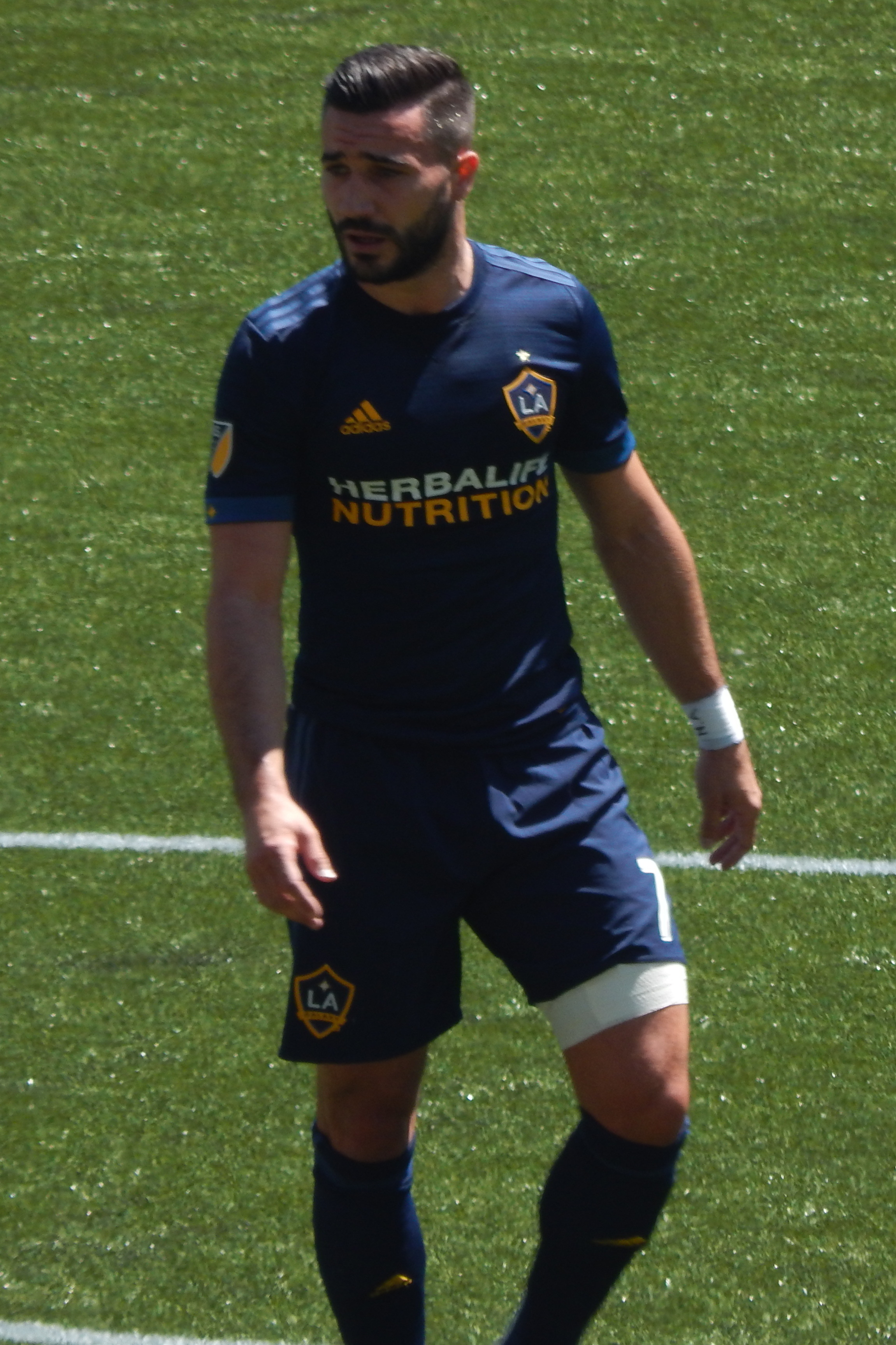
- Alessandrini playing for LA Galaxy

Personal information
- Date of birth: 3 April 1989 (age 37)
- Place of birth: Marseille, France
- Height: 1.73 m (5 ft 8 in)
- Position: Winger

Youth career
- 1996–1999: CA Plan de Cuques MJC
- 1999–2005: Marseille
- 2005–2008: Gueugnon

Senior career*
Years	Team	Apps	(Gls)
2008–2010	Gueugnon	33	(6)
2010–2012	Clermont	68	(22)
2012–2014	Rennes	49	(16)
2014–2017	Marseille	54	(8)
2017–2019	LA Galaxy	61	(24)
2020–2021	Qingdao FC	27	(11)
2022–2023	Shenzhen FC	25	(3)
Total		317	(99)
- * Club domestic league appearances and goals

Romain Alessandrini (born 3 April 1989) is a French former professional footballer who played as a winger.

== Career ==
Alessandrini spent six years of his youth career at Marseille. In 2005, he moved to Gueugnon making his debut in the third-tier Championnat National in 2008.

In 2010, he signed for Ligue 2 side Clermont, playing two seasons there.

In February 2013, while playing for Rennes, was selected by Didier Deschamps to play for France but an injury which ended his season, prevented him from making his international debut.

In summer 2014, Alessandrini returned to Marseille, joining from Rennes for a reported €5 million transfer fee.

On 31 January 2017, he was signed by LA Galaxy as a Designated Player. In January 2020, Alessandrini announced he would not return for LA Galaxy for 2020 season via Instagram.

On 28 February 2020, Alessandrini signed with Chinese club Qingdao Huanghai.

In March 2024, Alessandrini announced his retirement having departed Shenzhen FC two months prior.

== Style of play ==
Alessandrini is known for his pace, dribbling, and contributing goals and goal scoring opportunities from midfield.

== Career statistics ==
Appearances and goals by club, season and competition
Club	Season	League			National cup		League cup		Continental		Other		Total	
Club	Season	Division	Apps	Goals	Apps	Goals	Apps	Goals	Apps	Goals	Apps	Goals	Apps	Goals
Gueugnon	2009–10	Championnat National	6	3	0	0	1	0	—		—		7	3
Clermont	2010–11	Ligue 2	35	11	2	1	2	1	—		—		39	13
Clermont	2011–12	Ligue 2	33	11	2	0	1	0	—		—		36	11
Clermont	Total		68	22	4	1	3	1	—		—		75	24
Rennes	2012–13	Ligue 1	22	10	0	0	4	3	—		—		26	13
Rennes	2013–14	Ligue 1	27	6	5	1	2	0	—		—		34	7
Rennes	Total		49	16	5	1	6	3	—		—		60	20
Marseille	2014–15	Ligue 1	26	3	0	0	1	0	0	0	—		27	3
Marseille	2015–16	Ligue 1	22	5	2	1	0	0	6 (Note: Appearances in UEFA Europa League)	0	—		30	6
Marseille	2016–17	Ligue 1	6	0	1	0	1	0	0	0	—		8	0
Marseille	Total		54	8	3	1	2	0	6	0	—		65	9
LA Galaxy	2017	MLS	30	13	0	0	—		—		—		30	13
LA Galaxy	2018	MLS	26	11	0	0	—		—		—		26	11
LA Galaxy	2019	MLS	5	0	0	0	—		—		2 (Note: Appearances in MLS Cup Playoffs)	0	7	0
LA Galaxy	Total		61	24	0	0	—		—		2	0	63	24
Qingdao Huanghai	2020	Chinese Super League	16	9	1	0	—		—		—		17	9
Qingdao Huanghai	2021	Chinese Super League	11	2	0	0	—		—		1	0	12	2
Qingdao Huanghai	Total		27	11	1	0	—		—		1	0	29	11
Shenzhen FC	2022	Chinese Super League	14	2	0	0	—		—		—		14	2
Shenzhen FC	2023	Chinese Super League	11	1	0	0	—		—		—		11	1
Shenzhen FC	Total		25	3	0	0	—		—		—		25	3
Career total			290	87	13	3	12	4	6	0	3	0	324	94
