= Dimitri Payet =

French footballer (born 1987)

- Payet with Marseille in 2021

Personal information
- Full name: Dimitri Payet
- Date of birth: 29 March 1987 (age 39)
- Place of birth: Saint-Pierre, Réunion, France
- Height: 1.75 m (5 ft 9 in)
- Position: Attacking midfielder

Youth career
- 1995–1998: Saint-Philippe
- 1998–1999: JS Saint-Pierroise
- 1999–2003: Le Havre
- 2003–2004: AS Excelsior

Senior career*
Years	Team	Apps	(Gls)
2004–2005	AS Excelsior	36	(12)
2005–2007	Nantes	33	(5)
2007–2011	Saint-Étienne	129	(19)
2011–2013	Lille	71	(18)
2013–2015	Marseille	72	(15)
2015–2017	West Ham United	48	(11)
2017–2023	Marseille	187	(46)
2023–2025	Vasco da Gama	64	(7)
Total		640	(133)

International career
2007–2008	France U21	12	(4)
2010–2018	France	38	(8)
Medal record
Men's football
Representing France
UEFA European Championship
Runner-up	2016 France
- * Club domestic league appearances and goals

Dimitri Payet (French pronunciation: [dimitʁi pajɛt]; born 29 March 1987) is a French former professional footballer who primarily played as an attacking midfielder. A set-piece specialist known for his accurate, bending free kicks, he was described as a player who was "blessed with terrific technique and dribbling skills".

Payet was born on the French island of Réunion in the Indian Ocean, where he began his career playing for local clubs Saint-Philippe and Saint-Pierroise. In 1999, he moved to metropolitan France, joining Le Havre. Payet spent four years at the club before returning home to spend two years playing for AS Excelsior in the Réunion Premier League. In 2005, he joined FC Nantes and, after a successful 2006–07 season, joined AS Saint-Étienne on a four-year contract. With Saint-Étienne, Payet played in European competition for the first time after featuring in the 2008–09 edition of the UEFA Europa League. In the 2010–11 season, he won the UNFP Player of the Month award for September after scoring three goals and helping Saint-Étienne reach first place in the league table. Following the season, in June 2011, Payet joined the defending champions Lille signing a four-year contract. He had two years there and a further two at Olympique de Marseille before moving abroad to join West Ham United. In 2017 he moved back to France to join his old team, Marseille before leaving the club by mutual agreement in July 2023, joining Brazilian side Vasco da Gama a month later. On 22 March 2026, Payet announced his retirement from professional football during the halftime of the OM-LOSC Ligue 1 game he was reporting about.

Payet is a French international. From 2007 to 2008, he represented his country at under-21 level, making eleven appearances and scoring four goals. In 2010, he was called up to the senior team by manager Laurent Blanc for the first time. Payet made his international debut on 9 October 2010 in a UEFA Euro 2012 qualifying match against Romania, appearing as a substitute. He was a member of the French squad that reached the final of UEFA Euro 2016, being named afterward by UEFA in the Team of the Tournament.

== Club career ==
=== Early career ===
Payet was born in Saint-Pierre on the island of Réunion in the Indian Ocean and began his career at local club AS Saint-Philippe. While at the club as a youth, he was described by coaches as "a kid who stood out from his comrades" and, after three years of development training, moved to one of the best clubs on the island, JS Saint-Pierroise. After only a year at Saint-Pierroise, Payet was signed by professional club Le Havre in metropolitan France, with whom his club shared a mutual partnership. Le Havre also recruited former Saint-Pierroise players Florent Sinama Pongolle and Guillaume Hoarau during this period.

While at Le Havre, Payet endured a tumultuous four years. While training at the club, he was accused of having a difficult character and displaying a lack of motivation. The accusations ultimately led to his departure in 2003 as Payet returned to Réunion to sign with AS Excelsior. He spent only a year and a half at Excelsior playing in the Réunion Premier League before being signed in January 2005 by Nantes who sought to give the player another opportunity to prove himself on the mainland. Payet signed a two-year amateur deal with the club; however, Nantes were given the option of terminating the contract after six months.

=== Nantes ===
Upon his arrival at Nantes, Payet was placed in the club's reserve team in the Championnat de France Amateur, the fourth level of football in France. In the 2005–06 season, Payet quickly established himself as one of the best players on the reserve team. He impressed with the team in 22 matches scoring six goals and was described by the club's reserve team coach Stéphane Moreau as a "talented player despite his natural indifference". His influential play with the team resulted in the player being called up to the senior team in December 2005 by manager Serge Le Dizet. Payet made his professional debut on 19 December in a league match against Bordeaux appearing as a substitute in a 0–0 draw. After the winter break, Payet remained with the senior team and scored his first professional goal in a 4–1 win over Metz. The midfielder appeared as a substitute in the match and had been on the field for no more than two minutes before netting the goal. After appearing in a league match against Toulouse on 4 February, Payet was relegated back to the reserve team for the rest of the season.

Ahead of the 2006–07 season, Payet signed a three-year professional contract with Nantes. He was officially promoted to the senior team and assigned the number 31 shirt by Le Dizet. After appearing as a substitute in the first two matches of the season, Payet made his first professional start on 9 September 2006 in a league match against Lille. In the match, he scored the equalizing goal in a 1–1 draw. Two weeks later, Payet started again and scored the opening goal in a 2–1 win against Marseille. Payet, subsequently, appeared as a starter for the rest of the campaign. He scored his only other goal during the season in a 1–1 draw with Sedan. One dark spot during the campaign was a straight red card in an embarrassing 5–2 loss to Valenciennes. Despite the successful individual season by Payet, Nantes ultimately finished the season in 19th place and were relegated, which meant the club would play in Ligue 2 for the first time since 1963.

=== Saint-Étienne ===
Following Nantes' relegation, Payet's desire to remain in the first division led the player to issuing a transfer request. The player was, subsequently, linked with Sochaux and Saint-Étienne. Payet ultimately decided to sign with Les Verts, stating the move to the club was a "straightforward logical answer" and that Saint-Étienne "can offer me the opportunity to play, which is a priority". Payet ultimately succeeded in getting the move after agreeing to a four-year contract with the club ahead of the 2007–08 season. Nantes was compensated €4 million for the player.

In his first season at Saint-Étienne, Payet struggled to assert himself into the team. He made his club debut on 4 August 2007 in a 1–1 draw with Monaco. Despite being a starter for the majority of the campaign, Payet scored no goals and also failed to provide any assists. In a reversal of fortune, despite Payet's sub-par season, Saint-Étienne finished in fifth place, which meant qualification to the UEFA Cup. In the 2008–09 season, Payet return to the form that resulted in Saint-Étienne signing the player. Prior to the start of the season, he was given the honour of captaining Saint-Étienne during a friendly against the Réunion national team in the player's return to the island. Payet appeared in 30 league matches scoring four goals and supplying six assists in the season. He scored his first league goal for the club on 29 September 2008 in a 1–1 draw with Bordeaux, netting the opener. In December 2008, he scored the game-winning goal against his former club Le Havre.

Payet featured in European competition for the first time after playing in the 2008–09 edition of the UEFA Cup. He made his debut in the competition on 18 September in the first leg of the team's first round tie against Israeli club Hapoel Tel Aviv. On his debut, he scored the opening goal in a 2–1 win. In the group stage, Payet scored a goal in a 3–1 win over Danish club Copenhagen. In the knockout rounds, Payet was instrumental to the team's 5–2 aggregate victory over Greek club Olympiacos. In the first leg, he assisted on a goal in a 3–1 win, while in the second leg, he netted the opener in 2–1 positive result. Saint-Étienne were eliminated from the competition in the next round by German club Werder Bremen, losing 3–2 on aggregate. Payet appeared as a substitute in both legs. Due to focusing its efforts on performing well in four competitions, Saint-Étienne finished one spot short of relegation in the league. On 22 July 2009, Payet signed a two-year contract extension with the club until 2013.

In the 2009–10 season, Payet remained consistent appearing in 35 league matches scoring two goals and providing six assists. He also performed well in the cup competitions, particularly in the Coupe de France. On 24 January 2010, he scored a double in 4–1 victory over Lorient. Two weeks later, he scored the winner against Vannes. Saint-Étienne ultimately reached the quarter-finals losing to Lens. On 18 May 2010, Payet was involved in a physical altercation with teammate and captain Blaise Matuidi during the team's 1–0 defeat to Toulouse. Midway through the first half, Payet received criticism from teammate Yohan Benalouane for displaying a lack of aggression. He was then confronted by Matuidi, who echoed Benalouane's sentiments. Payet and Matuidi suddenly went face-to-face with the former player delivering a blow to Matuidi's head before the two were separated by referee Bruno Coue and teammates. As a result of the incident, Payet was substituted out after 31 minutes and sanctioned by club president Roland Romeyer. Payet apologized for the incident shortly after. On 6 October 2010, following both Payet and Matuidi's call up to the national team, Payet described the incident as "an argument that had no place" and that "the incident was explained and the two were on new ground". Matuidi described the altercation as a "lack of maturity" on both players part.

After the summer, Payet put the past behind him and opened the 2010–11 season by scoring seven goals in the first two months of domestic play. On 7 August 2010, he scored in the team's opening 3–1 defeat to Paris Saint-Germain. On 29 August 2010, Payet scored his first professional hat-trick in a 3–1 victory over Lens. After the international break, he scored a double against Montpellier. On 25 September, Payet delivered a perfect free-kick goal in the team's Derby du Rhône match against Lyon. The free-kick, described by local media as "superb and untouchable", was the only goal in the team's upset victory. The win placed Saint-Étienne in first place for the week. For his performances, Payet was awarded the UNFP Player of the Month award for September. Due to his performances domestically and international, Payet drew interest from several clubs, notably English clubs Chelsea and Liverpool. In January 2011, he was linked with a move to Paris Saint-Germain as the Parisian club looked to immediately replace the departed Stéphane Sessègnon. Payet sought for the move, but Saint-Étienne refused. Ahead of the closure of the transfer window, a frustrated Payet failed to show up to training in an effort to force the transfer. After returning to the team days later, Payet was demoted to the club's reserve team ahead of the team's league match against Montpellier on 5 February 2011.

Payet returned to Saint-Étienne's line-up for the following match against Lyon on 12 February. In his last 14 matches of 2010–11, Payet scored five goals and also registered a further three assists. He ended the season with 13 goals, making him Les Verts' top scorer.

=== Lille ===
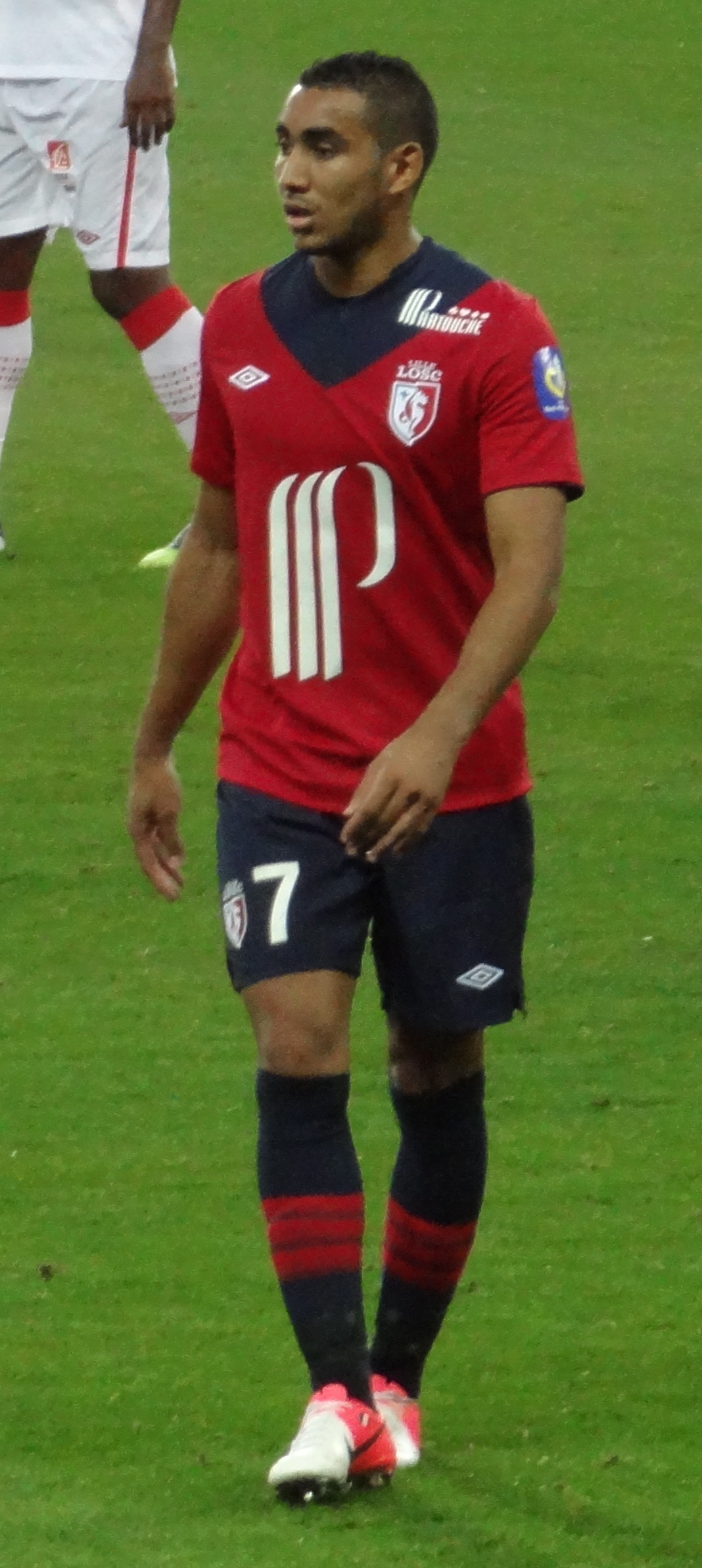
Payet playing for Lille in 2012

On 28 June 2011, Saint-Étienne manager Christophe Galtier confirmed that Payet was on the verge of signing with the defending league champions Lille after the player himself informed him the previous day. Hours later, the move was confirmed by both Saint-Étienne and Lille. Payet agreed to a four-year contract, while the transfer fee was priced at €9 million with future incentives to be included later.

Payet debuted for Lille in a 5–4 Trophée des Champions loss to Marseille at the Stade Ibn Batouta in Morocco on 27 July 2011. His Ligue 1 debut for the club came in the 2011–12 season opener against Nancy on 6 August. On 15 October, Payet scored his first goal for the club in a 3–1 win at Auxerre. Three days later, Payet made his UEFA Champions League debut as a 62nd-minute substitute for Benoît Pedretti in Lille's 1–0 home loss to Italian club Internazionale.

Payet ended his first season at Lille with six goals and six assists, starting in 23 of the team's 38 league matches.

In his second season at the Stade Pierre-Mauroy, after the sale of Eden Hazard to Chelsea, Payet established himself as a regular in Lille's attack, starting all but one of the team's Ligue 1 matches. At the season's winter break, Payet was recognised by the Ligue de Football Professionnel as the league's highest assist-maker, with 7 in the team's 19 matches. He had also reached six goals at the halfway stage, having scored in each of Lille's three matches prior to the winter break.

On 18 May 2013, Payet was named in the UNFP's Ligue 1 team of the season. He ended the season as the league's joint-top assist-maker, alongside Mathieu Valbuena, with 12 goals created. He also scored 12 league goals to register the second-highest scoring season of his career.

=== Marseille ===
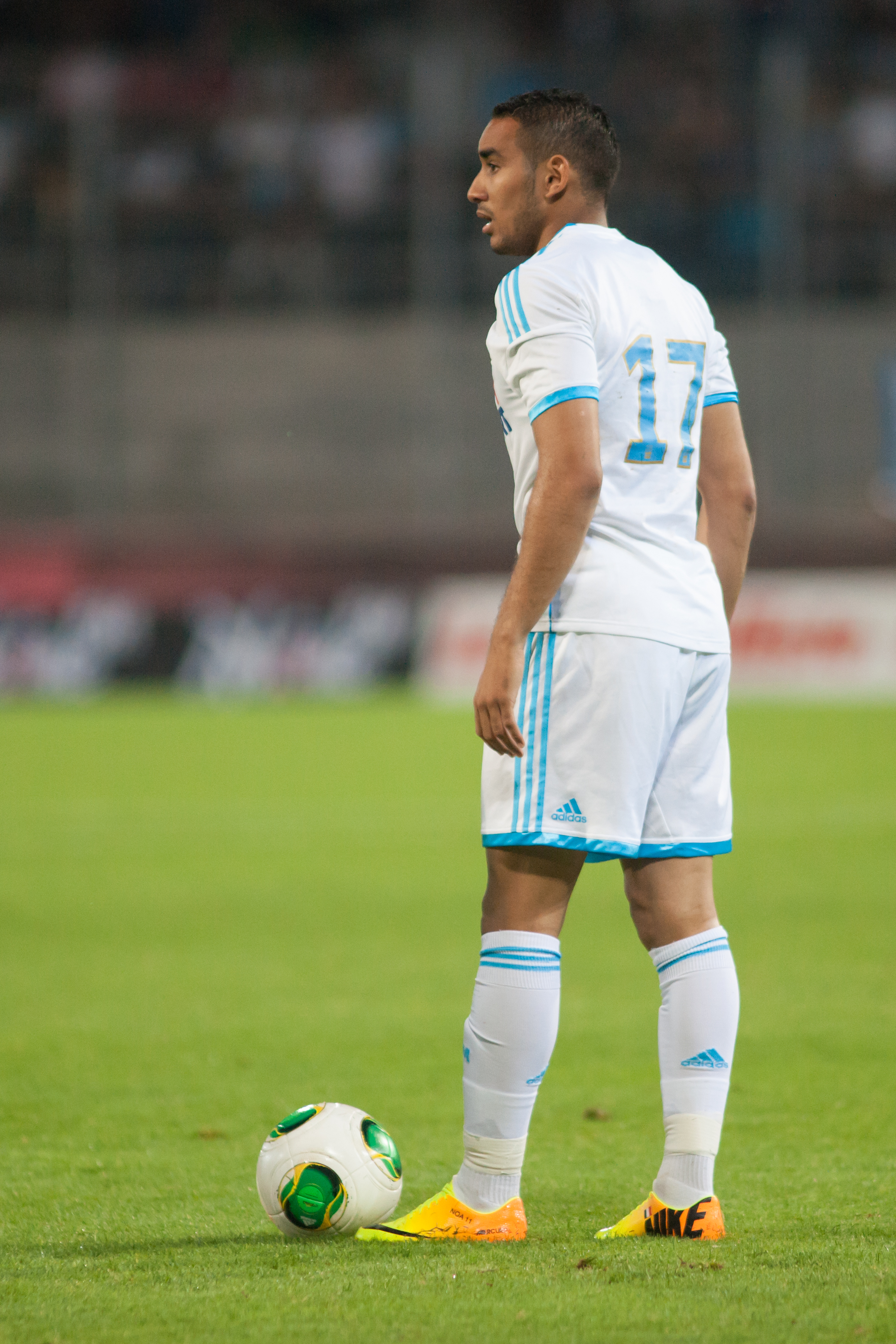
Payet playing for Marseille in 2013

On 27 June 2013, Marseille signed Payet for a fee in the region of €11 million. On his debut, he scored a brace within the first 15 minutes of the game, helping his side to a 3–1 victory over newcomers Guingamp at the Stade de Roudourou on 11 August.

In his second and final season with Marseille, Payet made more successful through-balls than any other player, with the exception of Lionel Messi, in European football's top five leagues. He made almost twice as many key passes as any other player, and made 17 assists in 36 league appearances, topping the Ligue 1 assist charts. Payet credited his excellent 2014–2015 Marseille season which transformed his career to Marcelo Bielsa, who was appointed the head coach of Marseille on a two-year contract in May 2014. "I clicked with him", he later told L'Équipe. "He made me more mature and consistent. He put order into my game. I still have his advice in my head." The key, according to Jan Van Winckel (who was Bielsa's assistant during the 2014–2015 season), was giving him the pivotal No. 10 role and making him the focal point of attacks.

"Bielsa was the first to recognise that Dimitri is a playmaker and not a winger. Dimitri is probably the best player in the world, together with Andrés Iniesta, with his back to the goal. He is so technically gifted and agile that it is almost impossible to get the ball from him. It is no coincidence that Dimi scored against Romania (at the Euro 2016 finals in France) when he was playing in a central role."

Jan van Winckel

On 17 May 2015, he was named in the Ligue 1 Team of the Season by the UNFP for the second time.

=== West Ham United ===
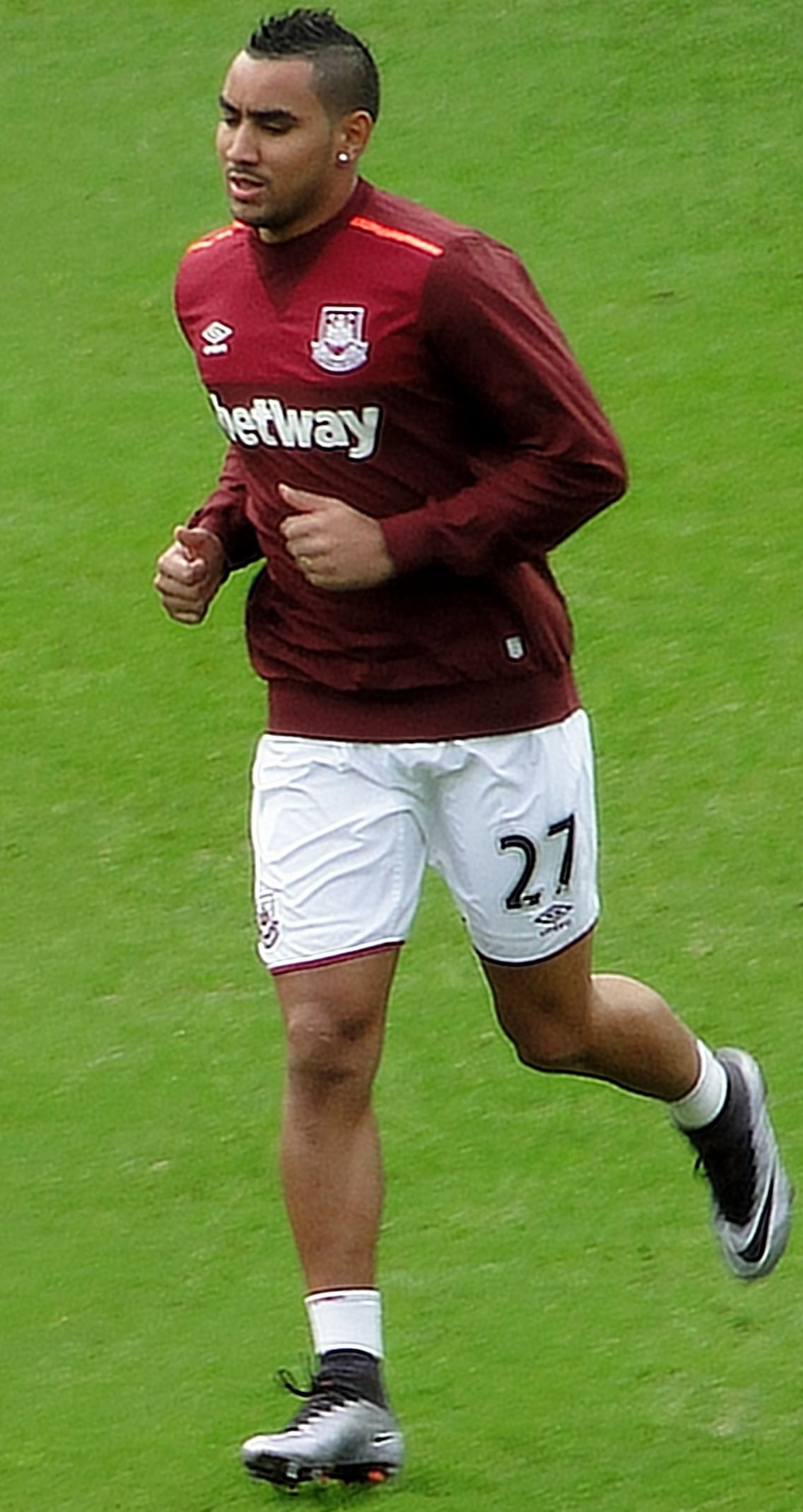
Payet playing for West Ham United in 2016

On 26 June 2015, Payet joined Premier League club West Ham United on a five-year contract, with the option for an extra 12 months. The transfer fee West Ham paid to Marseille was reported to be £10.7 million. Payet had not intended to leave Marseille in the summer of 2015. Rather, his sale was subject to Marseille's concern with financial stability after the sale of players such as Florian Thauvin and Giannelli Imbula had stalled. On 9 August, he made his Premier League debut against Arsenal at the Emirates Stadium and provided the free kick assist for Cheikhou Kouyaté to head in the opening goal of a 2–0 win. Six days later, he scored his first goal for the team, albeit in a 1–2 home defeat to Leicester City. Payet scored twice against Newcastle in a 2–0 win at the Boleyn Ground on 14 September. On 9 November, he was ruled out with an injury for an estimated three months after damaging his ankle in a tough challenge from Everton's James McCarthy in a 1–1 home draw on 7 November. He scored his first goal from his return from injury in a 3–1 comeback win against AFC Bournemouth on 12 January 2016, equalising with a curling hit free-kick that went in off the underside of the crossbar, which was praised by several pundits. His Man of the Match performance received a standing ovation from West Ham fans as he was substituted in the 78th minute for Alex Song.

In February 2016, Payet signed a new five-and-a-half-year contract with West Ham that would pay him £125,000 a week, committing him to the club until the summer of 2021. That March, Payet was named the Premier League Player of the Year at the 2016 London Football Awards. On 13 March, he scored a free kick, described by some journalists as "sublime" and "spectacular", from 35 yards (32 m) as West Ham drew 1–1 at Old Trafford against Manchester United in an FA Cup quarter-final.

Following an outstanding first season in English football, Payet was named Premier League Player of the Year at the London Football Awards in March and shortlisted by the Premier League for the 2016 PFA Players' Player of the Year Award. In May 2016, Payet became the 38th recipient of the West Ham United Player of the Year award.

Following an impressive spell of performances at Euro 2016, West Ham United awarded Payet with a £1,000,000 loyalty bonus in an attempt to pry interest away from other clubs. Payet was criticised for accepting this after his departure of the club during the following winter transfer window. During his time at West Ham, Payet scored 15 goals and recorded 23 assists in 60 games in all competitions.

=== Return to Marseille ===
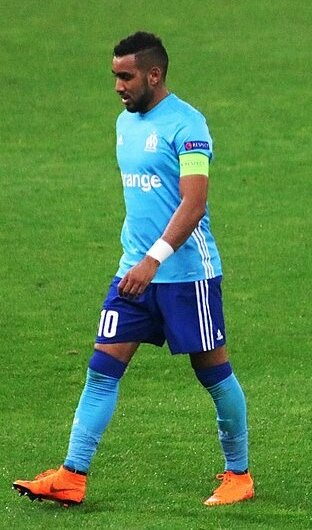
Payet playing for Marseille in 2018

After the takeover by American businessman Frank McCourt, Marseille introduced their "OM Champions" Project, one that would be fueled by a new influx of talent. This prompted the purchase of Morgan Sanson and Patrice Evra. However, both the coaching staff and the Marseille board had been keen on bringing Payet back to the club since the beginning of 2017 January transfer window.

On 12 January 2017, West Ham United manager Slaven Bilić announced that Payet no longer wanted to play for the club. He then did not feature at all in the matchday squad on 14 January, despite no reported injuries. At the London Stadium on that matchday, a mural installed in tribute to Payet winning Player of the Year was guarded by security in order to "prevent it being vandalised". Payet was subsequently the subject of two bids from his previous club Marseille which were both rejected by West Ham. They stated that they did not want to sell the player, but would prefer him to apologise to fans and continue playing for the club. On 29 January, West Ham accepted an offer of £25 million from Marseille for the transfer of Payet, marking a club record sale for West Ham. The day after Payet completed his move to Marseille, his mural at the London Stadium was removed and replaced with one to commemorate Andy Carroll's bicycle kick goal against Crystal Palace scored earlier in the month.

Payet made his second Marseille debut in a 2016–17 Coupe de France clash with Lyon on 31 January 2017, appearing as a substitute in extra time at the Stade Vélodrome as his new club won 2–1. On 8 February, Payet scored his first goal since returning to OM in a 2–0 home victory over Guingamp.

On 3 May 2018, Payet played in the Europa League semi-finals away to Red Bull Salzburg as Marseille played out a 1–2 away loss but secured a 3–2 aggregate win to secure a place in the 2018 UEFA Europa League Final. During the Europa League Final against Atlético Madrid, Payet suffered a hamstring injury and was substituted in the 32nd minute of the first half, leaving the field in tears. Marseille would go on to lose 3–0.

On 10 August 2018, during Marseille's 4–0 victory over Toulouse, Payet scored the first two goals of the 2018–19 Ligue 1 season, the second of which was a converted penalty awarded using video assistant refereeing (VAR) technology; the first usage of VAR in French football.

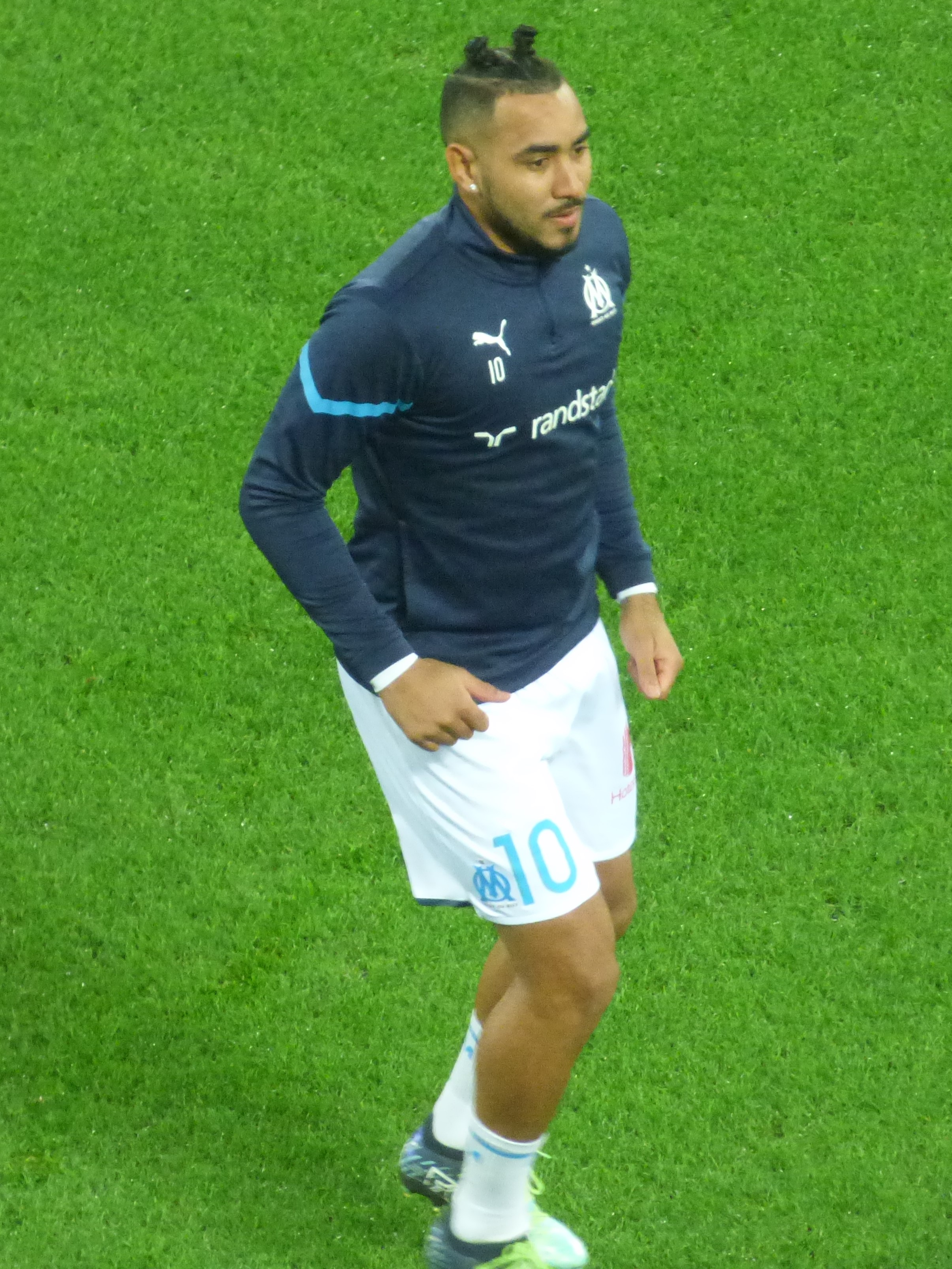
Payet warming-up with Marseille in 2022

Payet and the Marseille squad were involved in an altercation with the opposing crowd in Nice on 22 August 2021. After being struck by what appeared to be a plastic bottle thrown by a fan, Payet threw the bottle back into the crowd. Nice fans then invaded the pitch, causing some fans and players to assault each other, resulting in Payet and two other players being injured. In November 2021, a match between Lyon and Marseille was abandoned after a water bottle thrown by a fan hit Payet on the head as he was preparing to take a corner kick.

On 21 July 2023, Marseille president Pablo Longoria and Dimitri Payet announced during a press conference a mutual agreement to depart as a free agent.

=== Vasco da Gama ===
On 17 August 2023, Payet joined Brazilian Série A side Vasco da Gama on a two-year contract. On 3 September, he made his debut on a 1–1 away draw against Bahia. He regularly appeared on lineups thereafter, scoring his first goal on 18 October against Fortaleza, securing the 1–0 win in São Januário and pushing Vasco out of the relegation zone. He was awarded Man of the Match prize for his performance. On 12 November, Payet scored a free-kick on extra-time to secure a 2–1 league victory at home to América Mineiro.

On 9 June 2025, the club announced that his contract had been terminated by mutual consent.

=== Retirement ===
On 22 March 2026, Payet announced his retirement, at almost 39 years old. Despite his good performances during his career, Payet didn't win any professional competitions.

== International career ==
=== Youth ===
Payet is a former French under-21 international. He made his debut for the team in February 2007 in a friendly match against Switzerland, and assisted a Jérémy Ménez goal. In the team's ensuing match against Denmark, he scored a double in a 3–1 win.

=== Senior ===
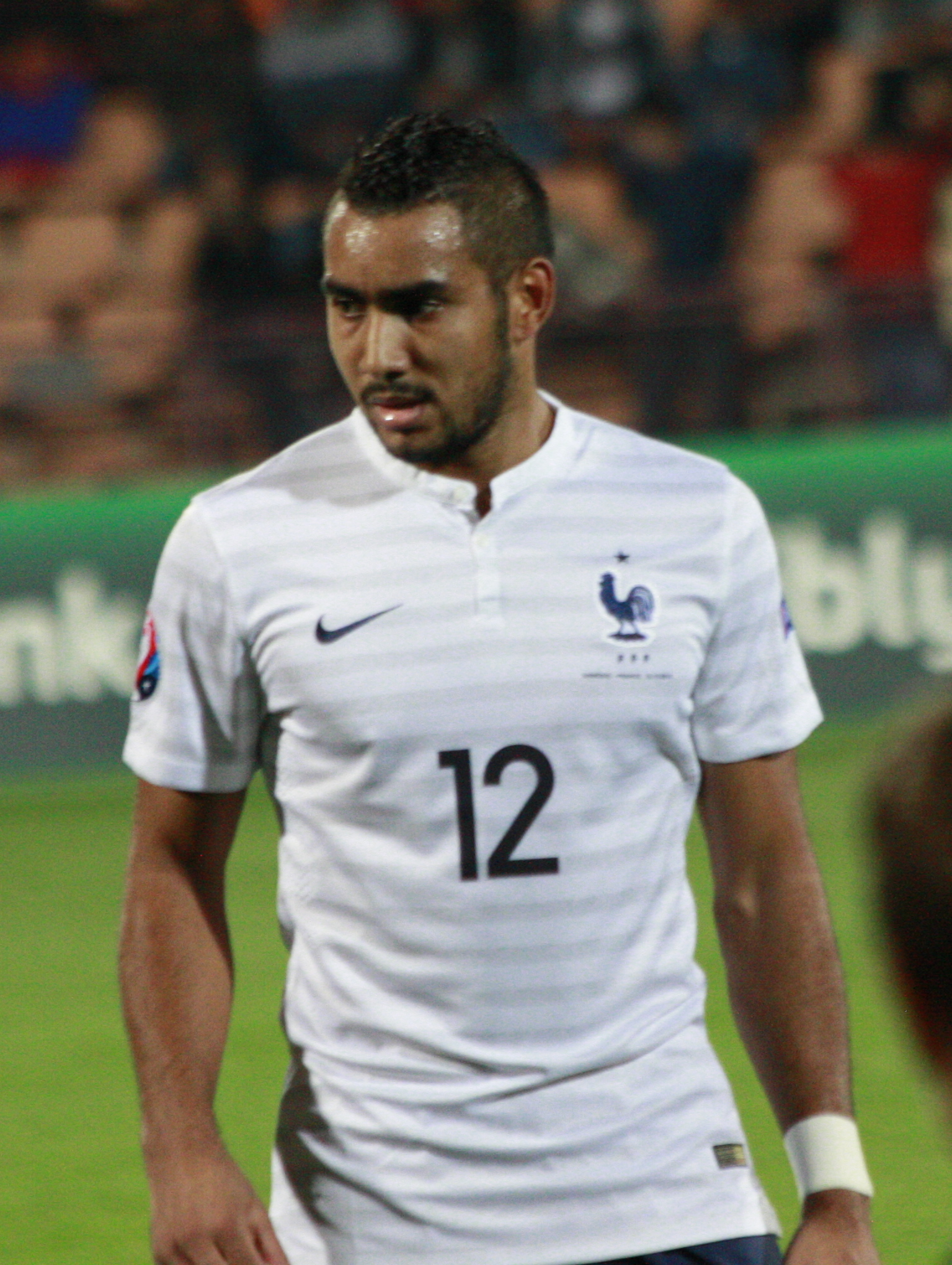
Payet playing for France in 2014

Payet was called up to the senior national team for the first time by Laurent Blanc for the Euro 2012 qualifying matches against Romania and Luxembourg. He made his debut in the former on 9 October 2010, coming on as a substitute for Karim Benzema in the 86th minute and assisted Yoann Gourcuff's goal to make it 2–0. Three days later, he came on for the last 30 minutes against Luxembourg and again assisted Gourcuff for a goal.

Payet scored his first goal on 7 June 2015, coming on for Mathieu Valbuena in the 73rd minute to net France's third goal 16 minutes later, in a 4–3 home friendly defeat by Belgium. Six days later, Payet was substituted at half-time in a 1–0 away friendly defeat by Albania. Having been absent from the French squad since then, Payet was recalled in March 2016 for a squad to play the Netherlands and Russia. His performance on 25 March in a 3–2 win against the Netherlands in Amsterdam was praised by manager Didier Deschamps. Payet hit the post with a second-half shot and created six chances, more than double any other player. He also had the most touches of any player, with 89. Four days later, with his first touch after replacing Antoine Griezmann, he scored a 30-yard free kick against Russia and later assisted Kingsley Coman to confirm a 4–2 win.

In May 2016, Payet was named in the France squad for Euro 2016. He was named the Man of the Match for scoring a goal, laying on an assist, creating eight scoring chances and delivering 13 crosses in the opening match of Euro 2016, on 10 June, a 2–1 win for France against Romania. In that match, Olivier Giroud headed Payet's cross into the goal in the 57th minute and Payet scored France's second goal in the 89th minute — a curling and powerful left-footed shot into the top corner from 2 metres (2.2 yd) outside the penalty box. In France's second group match against Albania on 15 June, Payet was again named the Man of the Match for creating six scoring chances for his teammates and supplying 17 crosses. In that match, Payet scored the second goal for France in a 2–0 win, the goal coming in the 96th minute. On 3 July, he scored and assisted in a 5–2 quarter-final win over Iceland at the Stade de France, as the hosts advanced to the semi-finals of the tournament. In the final of the tournament on 10 July, Payet was involved in a collision with Cristiano Ronaldo while attempting to challenge him for the ball, which resulted in an injury to the Portuguese forward and forced him off after 25 minutes of play. Payet was later substituted and Portugal eventually won the match 1–0 in extra time to lift the trophy.

Payet sustained an injury during the 2018 UEFA Europa League final, which resulted in him missing out on France's ultimately victorious 2018 FIFA World Cup squad. Payet was not personally informed about his omission by manager Didier Deschamps; according to his mother, he "found out watching on television like everyone else, with the family".

== Career statistics ==
=== Club ===
As of match played 15 April 2025

Appearances and goals by club, season and competition
Club	Season	League			National cup (Note: Includes Coupe de France, FA Cup, Copa do Brasil)		League cup (Note: Includes Coupe de la Ligue, EFL Cup)		Continental		Other		Total	
Club	Season	Division	Apps	Goals	Apps	Goals	Apps	Goals	Apps	Goals	Apps	Goals	Apps	Goals
AS Excelsior	2004	Réunion Premier League	36	12	0	0	—		—		—		36	12
Nantes	2005–06	Ligue 1	3	1	1	0	0	0	—		—		4	1
Nantes	2006–07	Ligue 1	30	4	4	0	1	0	—		—		35	4
Nantes	Total		33	5	5	0	1	0	—		—		39	5
Saint-Étienne	2007–08	Ligue 1	31	0	0	0	0	0	—		—		31	0
Saint-Étienne	2008–09	Ligue 1	30	4	1	0	1	0	10 (Note: Appearances in UEFA Cup)	3	—		42	7
Saint-Étienne	2009–10	Ligue 1	35	2	4	3	2	0	—		—		41	5
Saint-Étienne	2010–11	Ligue 1	33	13	1	0	0	0	—		—		34	13
Saint-Étienne	Total		129	19	6	3	3	0	10	3	—		148	25
Lille	2011–12	Ligue 1	33	6	3	0	2	0	4 (Note: Appearances in UEFA Champions League)	0	1 (Note: Appearance in Trophée des Champions)	0	43	6
Lille	2012–13	Ligue 1	38	12	3	1	3	0	8	0	—		52	13
Lille	Total		71	18	6	1	5	0	12	0	1	0	95	19
Marseille	2013–14	Ligue 1	36	8	2	0	2	0	5	0	—		45	8
Marseille	2014–15	Ligue 1	36	7	1	0	1	0	—		—		38	7
Marseille	Total		72	15	3	0	3	0	5	0	—		83	15
West Ham United	2015–16	Premier League	30	9	6	3	1	0	1 (Note: Appearances in UEFA Europa League)	0	—		38	12
West Ham United	2016–17	Premier League	18	2	1	0	3	1	0	0	—		22	3
West Ham United	Total		48	11	7	3	4	1	1	0	—		60	15
Marseille	2016–17	Ligue 1	15	4	2	1	0	0	—		—		17	5
Marseille	2017–18	Ligue 1	31	6	2	1	0	0	14	3	—		47	10
Marseille	2018–19	Ligue 1	31	4	1	0	1	0	5	2	—		38	6
Marseille	2019–20	Ligue 1	22	9	4	3	1	0	—		—		27	12
Marseille	2020–21	Ligue 1	33	7	1	0	—		6	2	1	1	41	10
Marseille	2021–22	Ligue 1	31	12	4	0	—		11 (Note: Appearances in UEFA Europa Conference League)	4	—		46	16
Marseille	2022–23	Ligue 1	24	4	1	0	—		2	0	—		27	4
Marseille	Total		187	46	15	5	2	0	38	11	1	1	243	63
Vasco da Gama	2023	Série A	17	2	—		—		—		—		17	2
Vasco da Gama	2024	Série A	23	3	8	0	—		—		10 (Note: Appearances in Campeonato Carioca)	2	41	5
Vasco da Gama	2025	Série A	4	0	2	0	—		1 (Note: Appearance in Copa Sudamericana)	0	10	0	17	0
Vasco da Gama	Total		44	5	10	0	—		1	0	20	2	75	7
Career total			620	130	52	12	18	1	67	14	22	3	777	160

=== International ===
Appearances and goals by national team and year
National team	Year	Apps	Goals
France	2010	3	0
France	2013	4	0
France	2014	4	0
France	2015	4	1
France	2016	17	7
France	2017	5	0
France	2018	1	0
Total		38	8

France score listed first, score column indicates score after each Payet goal

List of international goals scored by Dimitri Payet
No.	Date	Venue	Opponent	Score	Result	Competition
1	7 June 2015	Stade de France, Saint-Denis, France	Belgium	3–4	3–4	Friendly
2	29 March 2016	Stade de France, Saint-Denis, France	Russia	3–1	4–2	Friendly
3	30 May 2016	Stade de la Beaujoire, Nantes, France	Cameroon	3–2	3–2	Friendly
4	10 June 2016	Stade de France, Saint-Denis, France	Romania	2–1	2–1	UEFA Euro 2016
5	15 June 2016	Stade Vélodrome, Marseille, France	Albania	2–0	2–0	UEFA Euro 2016
6	3 July 2016	Stade de France, Saint-Denis, France	Iceland	3–0	5–2	UEFA Euro 2016
7	7 October 2016	Stade de France, Saint-Denis, France	Bulgaria	2–1	4–1	2018 FIFA World Cup qualification
8	11 November 2016	Stade de France, Saint-Denis, France	Sweden	2–1	2–1	2018 FIFA World Cup qualification

== Honours ==
AS Excelsior

- Coupe de la Réunion: 2004

Marseille

- UEFA Europa League runner-up: 2017–18

France

- UEFA European Championship runner-up: 2016

Individual

- UNFP Ligue 1 Team of the Year: 2012–13, 2014–15, 2021–22
- Marseille Player of the Season: 2014–15, 2021–22
- PFA Team of the Year: 2015–16 Premier League
- West Ham United Hammer of the Year: 2015–16
- UEFA European Championship Team of the Tournament: 2016
- Premier League Goal of the Month: October 2016
- UEFA Europa League Squad of the Season: 2017–18
- UEFA Europa Conference League Team of the Season: 2021–22

Orders

- Knight of the National Order of Merit: 2022
