= Giannelli Imbula =

Congolese footballer (born 1992)

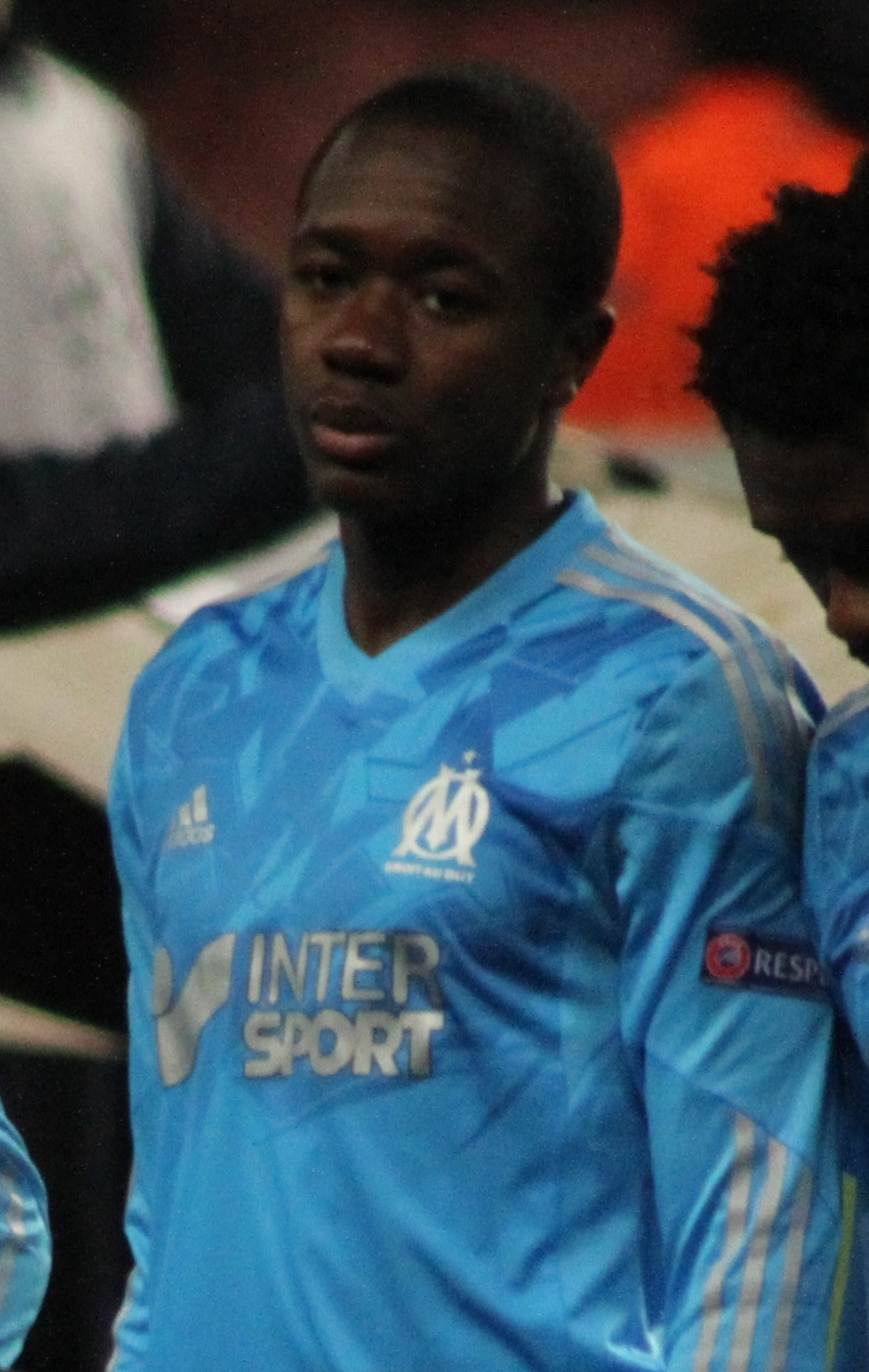
- Imbula with Marseille in 2013

Personal information
- Full name: Gilbert Imbula Wanga
- Date of birth: 12 September 1992 (age 34)
- Place of birth: Vilvoorde, Belgium
- Height: 1.86 m (6 ft 1 in)
- Position: Defensive midfielder

Youth career
- 1998–1999: US Argenteuil
- 2000–2004: Racing Club
- 2004–2005: Paris Saint-Germain
- 2005–2007: Racing Club
- 2007–2009: Guingamp

Senior career*
Years	Team	Apps	(Gls)
2009–2013	Guingamp	91	(4)
2013–2014	Marseille B	2	(0)
2013–2015	Marseille	66	(3)
2015–2016	Porto	10	(0)
2016–2020	Stoke City	26	(2)
2017–2018	→ Toulouse (loan)	28	(1)
2018–2019	→ Rayo Vallecano (loan)	22	(1)
2019–2020	→ Lecce (loan)	3	(0)
2020	Sochi	1	(0)
2021–2022	Portimonense	9	(0)
2023	Tuzlaspor	14	(1)
2023–2024	İstanbulspor	4	(0)

International career
2013	France U20	4	(0)
2013–2014	France U21	7	(0)
2019	DR Congo	2	(0)
- * Club domestic league appearances and goals as of 3 February 2024

Gilbert Imbula Wanga (born 12 September 1992) is a professional footballer who plays as a defensive midfielder. Born in Belgium, Imbula played youth football for France, before changing international allegiance to the DR Congo national football team.

Imbula began his career with French club Guingamp, where he progressed from the youth teams to make his professional debut in October 2009. He helped Guingamp to promotion from the Championnat National in 2010–11. He established himself as a key member of the Guingamp team in Ligue 2 and one of the stand out players in the division which saw him win the Ligue 2 Player of the Year Award. This prompted Ligue 1 side Marseille to sign Imbula for a fee of €7 million.

He spent two seasons at the Stade Vélodrome before joining Portuguese side Porto in the summer of 2015 for €20 million. After seven months at Porto, Imbula joined English club Stoke City for a club record £18.3 million. Despite making a promising start at Stoke, he had a poor 2016–17 season and was sent on loan to Ligue 1 side Toulouse in 2017–18, La Liga side Rayo Vallecano in 2018–19 and Serie A side Lecce in 2019–20.

== Club career ==
=== Early career ===
Imbula was born in Vilvoorde, Belgium, to Congolese parents, who moved to Paris when he was young. Growing up he played youth team football with US Argenteuil, Racing Club, Paris Saint-Germain before moving to Guingamp when he was 15.

Imbula progressed through the youth team at the Stade de Roudourou and made his professional debut in Ligue 2 on 16 October 2009 in a game against Dijon, becoming the youngest player in Ligue 2 history at 17 years, 1 month and 4 days of age. He played 33 times in 2010–11, scoring twice and helping Guingamp gain an instant promotion back to Ligue 2. He made 30 appearances in 2011–12 as the side finished seventh which was followed by promotion to Ligue 1 in 2012–13, with Imbula making 36 appearances, scoring two goals and he was named Ligue 2 Player of the Year.

=== Marseille ===
In July 2013, Imbula joined Marseille for a fee of €7 million, including bonuses. He played 37 times for Marseille in 2013–14 as the team and Imbula failed to make a significant impact, finishing outside of the European places in sixth spot. However, under the management of Marcelo Bielsa in 2014–15, Imbula formed an effective understanding with André Ayew, André-Pierre Gignac and Dimitri Payet where they finished in fourth place in the league table and were the second highest goalscorers with 76 goals.

=== Porto ===
On 1 July 2015, Imbula signed a five-year contract with Portuguese side Porto for a club record fee of €20 million. He struggled, however, to settle in Portugal and reports emerged that Porto would be willing to let him leave in the 2016 January transfer window.

=== Stoke City ===
On 1 February 2016, Imbula joined Premier League club Stoke City on a five-and-a-half-year contract for a club record €24 million (£18.3 million). He made his Stoke debut on 6 February 2016 in a 3–0 defeat against Everton. Imbula scored his first goal for Stoke on 13 February in a 3–1 win over Bournemouth. He made a good start to his Stoke career and earned the praise of teammate Geoff Cameron. He scored in a 2–1 victory against West Ham United on the final day of the 2015–16 season, helping Stoke to a ninth-place finish.

Stoke and Imbula made a poor start to the 2016–17 campaign and he was dropped from the side by manager Mark Hughes. He returned to the side in December and January before again being left out of the squad by Hughes. Imbula made 14 appearances for Stoke in 2016–17 and it was reported that the club would be willing to cut their losses on Imbula in the summer transfer window. Whilst at Stoke, Imbula's attitude prompted some heavy criticism from some of his club teammates. Glen Johnson spoke on BBC Radio 5 Live in March 2019 about an occasion where Imbula subbed himself in a pre-season game after someone did not pass him the ball, only to sub himself back on again ten minutes later. Imbula's contract with Stoke was terminated on 22 February 2020.

==== Loan to Toulouse ====
In August 2017, Imbula joined Toulouse on loan for the 2017–18 season. Imbula played 34 times for Toulouse, helping them remain in Ligue 1 after they defeated Ajaccio in a relegation play-off.

==== Loan to Rayo Vallecano ====
On 30 August 2018, Imbula moved to La Liga side Rayo Vallecano on a one-year loan deal. Imbula played 24 times for Rayo in 2018–19 as the team finished bottom of the table, scoring once with a long-range strike in a 0–1 win at SD Huesca on his 14 September 2018 debut.

==== Loan to Lecce ====
Imbula joined Serie A side Lecce on loan for the 2019–20 season. On 21 February 2020 he received the consensual termination of the contract with the Italian club.

=== Sochi ===
On 3 March 2020, Imbula signed for Russian Premier League club PFC Sochi. He left Sochi in late July 2020.

After leaving Sochi, Imbula was allowed to use the training facilities of former club Guingamp, but ultimately he wasn't offered a contract by the Ligue 2 side.

=== Portimonense ===
On 9 March 2021, Imbula signed for Primeira Liga club Portimonense S.C.

=== Tuzlaspor ===
On 9 January 2023, Imbula joined TFF First League club Tuzlaspor.

=== İstanbulspor ===
On 30 August 2023 he signed a 2-year contract with Süper Lig club İstanbulspor.

== International career ==
Born to Congolese parents, Imbula was born in Belgium but raised in France. In 2013, he acquired French nationality by naturalization and received a call up from France under-21 team to compete in the Toulon Tournament. In October 2015, however, Imbula publicly expressed his desire to play for the Belgium national team, for which reason he has required authorization to FIFA to do so. Imbula was called up to the DR Congo national team squad to face Tanzania on 14 March 2018, but rejected the call-up. One year later, Imbula was named in the provisional DR Congo squad for the 2019 Africa Cup of Nations. However, he was not included in the final 23-man squad after his international clearance was not processed in time. He received international clearance in October 2019. Imbula debuted for the DR Congo in a 0–0 2021 Africa Cup of Nations qualification tie with Gabon on 14 November 2019.

== Style of play ==
Imbula plays as a defensive midfielder and has been described by Mark Hughes as being able to play in centre midfield: "He's a defensive midfielder and he's got a lot of attributes in terms of understanding that role, but he can play in a three as well. I like that flexibility in players because it gives me more options. He's a good young player with good power, good ability on the ball, and a good range of passing."

== Personal life ==
Imbula married his fiancée, Linda, in the summer of 2016. Imbula was caught speeding in Stockport in March 2016.

== Career statistics ==
As of match played 8 January 2024

Appearances and goals by club, season and competition
Club	Season	League			National cup		League cup		Other		Total	
Club	Season	Division	Apps	Goals	Apps	Goals	Apps	Goals	Apps	Goals	Apps	Goals
Guingamp	2009–10	Ligue 2	2	0	0	0	0	0	—		2	0
Guingamp	2010–11	Championnat National	28	2	1	0	4	0	—		33	2
Guingamp	2011–12	Ligue 2	27	0	0	0	3	0	—		30	0
Guingamp	2012–13	Ligue 2	34	2	2	0	0	0	—		36	2
Guingamp	Total		91	4	3	0	7	0	—		101	4
Marseille B	2013–14	CFA 2	2	0	—		—		—		2	0
Marseille	2013–14	Ligue 1	29	1	2	0	2	0	4 (Note: All appearances in the UEFA Champions League)	0	37	1
Marseille	2014–15	Ligue 1	37	2	1	0	1	0	—		39	2
Marseille	Total		66	3	3	0	3	0	4	0	76	3
Porto	2015–16	Primeira Liga	10	0	3	0	3	0	5	0	21	0
Stoke City	2015–16	Premier League	14	2	0	0	0	0	—		14	2
Stoke City	2016–17	Premier League	12	0	1	0	1	0	—		14	0
Stoke City	2017–18	Premier League	0	0	0	0	0	0	—		0	0
Stoke City	2018–19	EFL Championship	0	0	0	0	0	0	—		0	0
Stoke City	2019–20	EFL Championship	0	0	0	0	0	0	—		0	0
Stoke City	Total		26	2	1	0	1	0	—		28	2
Stoke City U23	2016–17	—	—		—		—		1 (Note: Appearance in the EFL Trophy)	0	1	0
Toulouse (loan)	2017–18	Ligue 1	28	1	0	0	2	0	2 (Note: All appearances in the Ligue 1 relegation play-offs)	0	34	1
Rayo Vallecano (loan)	2018–19	La Liga	22	1	2	0	—		—		24	1
Lecce (loan)	2019–20	Serie A	3	0	1	1	—		—		4	1
Sochi	2019–20	Russian Premier League	1	0	0	0	—		—		1	0
Portimonense	2021–22	Primeira Liga	9	0	3	0	2	0	—		14	0
Tuzlaspor	2022–23	TFF First League	14	1	0	0	—		—		14	1
Tuzlaspor	2023–24	TFF First League	1	0	0	0	—		—		1	0
Tuzlaspor	Total		15	1	0	0	0	0	0	0	15	1
İstanbulspor	2023–24	Süper Lig	4	0	1	0	—		—		5	0
Career total			277	12	17	1	18	0	12	0	324	13

== Honours ==
Individual

- UNFP Ligue 2 Player of the Year: 2012–13
- UNFP Ligue 2 Team of the Year: 2012–13
