= Alaixys Romao =

Togolese footballer (born 1984)

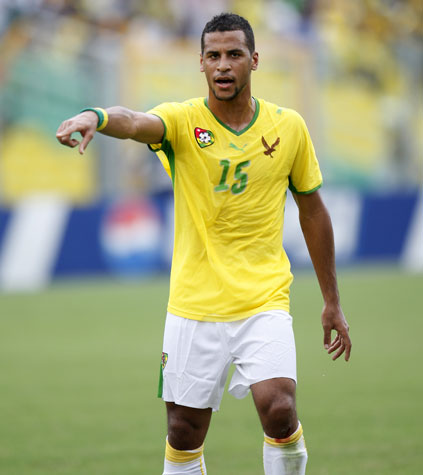
- Romao with Togo in 2009

Personal information
- Full name: Jacques-Alaixys Romao
- Date of birth: 18 January 1984 (age 42)
- Place of birth: L'Haÿ-les-Roses, France
- Height: 1.80 m (5 ft 11 in)
- Positions: Midfielder; centre-back

Team information
- Current team: Six-Fours Le Brusc FC

Senior career*
Years	Team	Apps	(Gls)
2002–2004	Toulouse B	71	(0)
2004–2007	Louhans-Cuiseaux	82	(5)
2007–2010	Grenoble	103	(2)
2010–2013	Lorient	93	(4)
2013–2016	Marseille	127	(4)
2016–2018	Olympiacos	55	(6)
2018–2020	Reims	62	(0)
2020–2021	Guingamp	35	(0)
2021–2023	Ionikos	61	(1)
2023–2025	Athens Kallithea	19	(0)
2025	Ionikos	7	(0)
2025–	Six-Fours Le Brusc FC	0	(0)

International career^{‡}
2002–2003	France U18	0	(0)
2005–	Togo	97	(0)
- * Club domestic league appearances and goals as of 26 May 2024 (UTC) ‡ National team caps and goals as of 17 November 2025

Jacques-Alaixys Romao (born 18 January 1984), is a professional footballer who plays as a center-back for Six-Fours Le Brusc FC. Born in France, he represents Togo at international level.

== Club career ==
=== Early career ===
Romao started his professional career with Toulouse FC, but only managed appearances for the B team in 2004–05 and was then transferred for free to Louhans-Cuiseaux in the Championnat National, the French third tier.

=== Grenoble ===
In the 2007–08 season, he was traded for free to Grenoble and his career took off. A solid and rugged defensive midfielder, Romao proved a valuable asset for Grenoble. His first season with the club saw him appear 30 times in Ligue 2 with 2 goals and 10 yellow cards topped with a promotion to Ligue 1.

In 2008–09, he made 37 appearances, 32 of them as a starter in Ligue 1 and managed to avoid the drop. The next season, Romao made 29 appearances for Grenoble and 2 assists. However, Grenoble was not able to avoid the drop this time and was relegated.

=== Lorient ===
Romao was then signed by FC Lorient in July 2010 for a reported fee of 8,000.00 GBP. In the 2010–11 season, his first with FC Lorient, Romao made 33 appearances in Ligue 1 with a goal and 2 assists, 2 appearances in the Ligue Cup and 2 appearances in the French Cup competition with 1 goal. Romao made another 32 appearances as a starter in the 2011–12 season with a goal and an assist, but also with 11 yellow cards and 2 red cards.

=== Marseille ===
On 31 January 2013, Romao was signed by Marseille. According to L'Équipe, the transfer fee paid to Lorient was €2 million and the duration of Romao's contract was 3.5 years. At the end of his contract in the summer of 2016, he was released by the club, having made 127 appearances in all competitions, scoring 4 goals.

=== Olympiacos ===
On 31 August 2016, Romao joined Greek club Olympiacos, signing a two-year contract with the option of another year. At the end of the season, he helped the club to win its 7th consecutive Super League title.

On 16 August 2017, he scored his first international goal with the club, as Olympiacos came from behind, in first half, to win 2–1 against HNK Rijeka in added time for the 1st leg of UEFA Champions League play-offs. On 16 September 2017, he signed a new contract with the club, which would keep him at the club till the summer of 2020.

=== Reims ===
On 24 July 2018, Romao joined French club Stade de Reims, signing a two-year deal with the option of another year.

=== Guingamp ===
Following the expiration of his contract at Reims, Romao joined Guingamp on a free transfer.

=== Ionikos ===
On 30 June 2021, Romao signed a one-year contract with Greek club Ionikos as a free agent. No agreement could be found on the contours of an extension in Brittany.

=== Athens Kallithea ===
On 1 July 2023, Romao signed with Greek club Athens Kallithea.

=== Return to Ionikos ===
In 2025, Romao returned to Ionikos, which now competed in the first division of the Piraeus FCA amateur championship. During that period, he was also called to the National Team of Togo.

== International career ==
The French-born player has featured for the French under-18 national team, but is a member of the Togolese national team since 2005, for which he was called up to the 2006 World Cup.

In 2013 he played in all matches at 2013 Africa Cup of Nations where his team reached the quarter-finals.

In March 2019, Romao was called up for the first time since October 2017, being selected for the decisive 2019 Africa Cup of Nations qualification match against Benin.

== Career statistics ==
=== International ===
As of match played 17 November 2025

Appearances and goals by national team and year
National team	Year	Apps	Goals
Togo	2005	5	0
Togo	2006	11	0
Togo	2007	3	0
Togo	2008	6	0
Togo	2009	7	0
Togo	2010	1	0
Togo	2011	5	0
Togo	2012	6	0
Togo	2013	7	0
Togo	2014	5	0
Togo	2015	2	0
Togo	2016	8	0
Togo	2017	3	0
Togo	2019	1	0
Togo	2021	4	0
Togo	2022	5	0
Togo	2023	6	0
Togo	2024	8	0
Togo	2025	4	0
Total		97	0

== Honours ==
Olympiacos

- Super League Greece: 2016–17

Ionikos

- Piraeus FCA first division group 1 championship: 2024–25
