= Jan Van Winckel =

Belgian football coach (born 1974)

Personal information
- Date of birth: 26 March 1974 (age 52)
- Place of birth: Duffel, Belgium
- Height: 1.88 m (6 ft 2 in)
- Position: Defender

Team information
- Current team: Al-Ahli Saudi (Technical Advisor)

Managerial career
- Years: Team
- 1994–2000: University of Leuven (head-coach)
- 1994–2000: Stade Leuven (assistant manager)
- 2000–2002: KV Mechelen (assistant manager)
- 2002–2003: Al-Hilal Saudi (assistant manager)
- 2003–2004: United Arab Emirates (assistant manager)
- 2005–2006: United Arab Emirates U23
- 2006–2008: Belgium national football team (scout)
- 2006–2011: Club Brugge KV (assistant manager)
- 2011–2012: Beerschot AC (assistant manager)
- 2012–2014: Al-Ahli Saudi (Technical Director)
- 2014–2015: Olympique de Marseille (Assistant Manager)
- 2015–2018: Saudi Arabian Football Federation (Technical Director)
- 2019–2022: United Arab Emirates Football Association (Senior Technical Consultant)
- 2022–2023: Al-Ahli Saudi (Technical Director)
- 2023–: United Arab Emirates Football Association (Technical Director)

Jan Van Winckel (born 26 March 1974) is a Belgian football coach, UEFA and AFC Pro License Instructor and a FIFA Technical Expert. He is Technical Director at the United Arab Emirates Football Association.

Van Winckel holds a UEFA Pro-licence and graduated with a Master in Sport Sciences and a Master in Business Economics from the University of Leuven. He remains faculty of the Movement Control & Neuroplasticity Research Group and is the author of various book and academic articles

Van Winckel was Assistant Coach at Al-Hilal Saudi in 2004. He held the same role at the national team of the United Arab Emirates in 2005.

In 2002, he was at the heart of Belgium's footballing renaissance with Michel Sablon, Marc Van Geersom, Werner Helsen, and Bob Browaeys.

At Olympique de Marseille, Van Winckel acted as Marcelo Bielsa's right hand and first team assistant.

After resigning at Olympique de Marseille, Van Winckel became the technical director of the Saudi Arabian Football Federation in 2015. As technical director, Van Winckel led the Saudi Arabian football team to the World Cup in Russia in 2018.

In 2019, Jan Van Winckel signed as a senior technical consultant to the United Arab Emirates Football Association. He set up the UAE FA 2nd and 3rd divisions and has launched projects to privatize football clubs in the United Arab Emirates. In 2022, he extended his contract.

In 2022, Van Winckel signed an agreement with Al-Ahli Saudi as Technical Ddvisor. He was technical director at the club from 2014 to 2015 and became vice-champion of Asia. The club was promoted back to the Saudi Pro League.

In 2023, Van Winckel was re-appointed as Technical Director of the United Arab Emirates Football Association. He appointed the Portuguese manager Paulo Bento as head coach of the national team.

== Career ==
=== As Player ===
- 1994-1995: Belgian Champion University football
- 1996-1997: Belgian Champion University football
- 1994-1997: Belgian National University team
- 1996-1997: Belgian National University futsal team
- 2001-2002: 7th most valuable player Belgian Futsal Association
- 2001-2002: 5th best goal scorer Belgian Futsal Association
- 2001-2002: Final Belgian Cup Belgian Futsal Association
- 2001-2002: Selected for the national futsal team

=== As Coach ===
- 1994-2000 : Stade Leuven BEL
- 2000-2002 : KV Mechelen BEL
- 2002-2004 : Al-Hilal FC KSA
- 2004-2006 : United Arab Emirates national football team United Arab Emirates
- 2006-2008 : Belgium national football team *Scout BEL
- 2006-2011 : Club Brugge KV BEL
- 2011-2012 : Beerschot AC BEL
- 2014-2015 : Olympique de Marseille FRA

=== As Technical Director ===
- 2012-2014: Al-Ahli SC (Jeddah) KSA
- 2015-2018 : Saudi Arabian Football Federation KSA
- 2022-2023: Al-Ahli SC (Jeddah) KSA
- 2023- : United Arab Emirates national football team

=== Others ===
- 2015 - : Asian Football Confederation Member of Expert Panels on Coach Education & Youth Development
- 2015 - : Saudi Arabian Olympic Committee Member of Mass Participation Committee and High Performance Committee

== Honours ==
- 1997-1998 : Belgian Champion University football BEL
- 2000-2002 : KV Mechelen BEL : Winner Belgian League
- 2002-2005 : Al-Hilal FC KSA : Winner Saudi Crown Prince Cup and Saudi Federation Cup
- 2005-2006 : United Arab Emirates national football team United Arab Emirates : Qualified for AFC Asian Cup and Arabian Gulf Cup and winner of Kirin Cup
- 2006 : Swaziland national football team SWZ : Second place COSAFA Cup
- 2006-2011 : Club Brugge KV BEL : Winner of Belgian Cup
- 2013-2014 : Al-Ahli SC (Jeddah) KSA : Vice-champion AFC Champions League
- 2015-2017 : Saudi Arabian Football Federation KSA : Winner of Arabian Gulf Cup
- 2018 : Saudi Arabian Football Federation KSA : Qualified for the FIFA World Cup in Russia

== Bibliography ==
- Fitness in Soccer - The science and practical application with Tenney D, Helsen W, McMillan K, Meert JP, Bradley P, Moveo Ergo Sum, Leuven 2014,ISBN 9789082132304 www.fitnessinsoccer.com
- Voetbalconditie - Tussen praktijk en wetenschap door Jean Pierre Meert, Werner Helsen, Kenny Mcmillan, David Tenney, Jan Van Winckel. ACCO Uitgeverij. Publicatiedatum: 28 maart 2014. Pagina's: 608. ISBN 9789033497780
