= 2015–16 FC Girondins de Bordeaux season =

Bordeaux
2015–16 season
- Chairman: Jean-Louis Triaud
- Manager: Willy Sagnol (Until March 2016); Ulrich Ramé (From March 2016 to May 2016)
- Stadium: Nouveau Stade de Bordeaux
- Ligue 1: 11th
- Coupe de France: Round of 16
- Coupe de la Ligue: Semi-final
- UEFA Europa League: Group stage
- Top goalscorer: League: Cheick Diabaté (10); All: Cheick Diabaté (13)
- Highest home attendance: 39,672 vs Marseille (20 December 2015)
- Lowest home attendance: 8,676 vs Lorient (12 January 2016)
Home colours	Away colours	Third colours

The 2015–16 FC Girondins de Bordeaux season was the 135th professional season of the club since its creation in 1881. During this campaign, Bordeaux competed in Ligue 1, the top tier of French football, as well as the Coupe de France, the Coupe de la Ligue and the UEFA Europa League.

== Players ==
French teams are limited to four players without EU citizenship. Hence, the squad list includes only the principal nationality of each player; several non-European players on the squad have dual citizenship with an EU country. Also, players from the ACP countries—countries in Africa, the Caribbean, and the Pacific that are signatories to the Cotonou Agreement—are not counted against non-EU quotas due to the Kolpak ruling.

=== First-team squad ===
As of 1 February 2016.

Note: Flags indicate national team as defined under FIFA eligibility rules; some limited exceptions apply. Players may hold more than one non-FIFA nationality.

No.	Pos.	Nation	Player
1	GK	FRA	Paul Bernardoni (on loan from Troyes)
2	DF	SRB	Milan Gajić
3	DF	GER	Diego Contento
4	DF	BRA	Pablo
5	DF	FRA	Nicolas Pallois
6	DF	SEN	Lamine Sané (captain)
7	MF	MLI	Abdou Traoré
8	MF	FRA	Grégory Sertic
9	FW	URU	Diego Rolán
10	MF	URU	Mauro Arambarri
11	MF	FRA	Clément Chantôme
12	FW	SWE	Isaac Kiese Thelin
13	FW	CIV	Thomas Touré
14	FW	MLI	Cheick Diabaté
16	GK	FRA	Cédric Carrasso
17	MF	GAB	André Biyogo Poko
18	MF	CZE	Jaroslav Plašil
19	MF	FRA	Nicolas Maurice-Belay

No.	Pos.	Nation	Player
20	FW	BRA	Jussiê
21	DF	FRA	Cédric Yambéré
22	MF	FRA	Adam Ounas
23	MF	ARG	Valentin Vada
24	DF	FRA	Mathieu Debuchy (on loan from Arsenal)
25	FW	BRA	Malcom
26	DF	FRA	Frédéric Guilbert
27	FW	FRA	Enzo Crivelli
28	MF	CMR	Kévin Soni
29	DF	FRA	Maxime Poundjé
30	GK	FRA	Jérôme Prior
40	GK	FRA	Lucas Bobe
—	GK	FRA	Alexandre Brucato
—	DF	FRA	Jean Ambrose
—	DF	FRA	Ilias Hassani
—	DF	FRA	Baba Traoré
—	MF	FRA	Robin Maulun

=== Out on loan ===
Note: Flags indicate national team as defined under FIFA eligibility rules; some limited exceptions apply. Players may hold more than one non-FIFA nationality.

No.	Pos.	Nation	Player
—	DF	FRA	Théo Pellenard (to Paris FC)
—	MF	FRA	Younés Kaabouni (to Red Star)

No.	Pos.	Nation	Player
—	FW	FRA	Gaëtan Laborde (to Clermont)

== Transfers ==
=== Transfers in ===
Date	Pos.	Player	Age	Moved from	Fee	Notes
22 July 2015	MF	(Serbia) Milan Gajić	19	(Serbia) OFK Beograd	Free Transfer	
31 August 2015	DF	(Brazil) Pablo	24	(Brazil) Ponte Preta	Free transfer	
31 January 2016	FW	(Brazil) Malcom	18	(Brazil) Corinthians	Undisclosed	
31 January 2016	MF	(Uruguay) Mauro Arambarri	20	(Uruguay) Defensor	Undisclosed	

=== Loans in ===
Date	Pos.	Player	Age	Loaned from	Return date	Notes
31 January 2016	GK	(France) Paul Bernardoni	18	(France) Troyes	30 June 2016	
1 February 2016	RB	(France) Mathieu Debuchy	30	(England) Arsenal	30 June 2016	

=== Transfers out ===
Date	Pos.	Player	Age	Moved to	Fee	Notes
1 July 2015	GK	(Slovenia) Ažbe Jug	23	(Portugal) Sporting CP	Free Transfer	
1 July 2015	DF	(Martinique) Julien Faubert	31			
1 July 2015	MF	(France) Marc Planus	33	Free agent	Released	
1 July 2015	MF	(France) Clément Badin	20	Free agent	Released	
8 July 2015	MF	(Benin) David Djigla	19	(France) Chamois Niortais	Free transfer	
20 July 2015	DF	(Brazil) Mariano	29	(Spain) Sevilla	Undisclosed	
20 July 2015	FW	(Argentina) Emiliano Sala	24	(France) Nantes	Undisclosed	
11 January 2015	MF	(Senegal) Henri Saivet	25	(England) Newcastle	Undisclosed	
30 January 2016	MF	(Tunisia) Wahbi Khazri	24	(England) Sunderland	Undisclosed	

=== Loans out ===
Date	Pos.	Player	Age	Loaned to	Return date	Notes
9 July 2015	MF	(France) Younès Kaabouni	20	(France) Red Star	30 June 2016	
12 August 2015	DF	(France) Théo Pellenard	21	(France) Paris FC	30 June 2016	
8 January 2016	FW	(France) Gaëtan Laborde	21	(France) Clermont Foot	30 June 2016	

== Pre-season and friendlies ==
12 July 2015 Friendly	Gent (Belgium)	4–3	(France) Bordeaux
17:00 CEST (UTC+02:00)	Kums 22' (pen.); Depoitre 47'; Raman 71', 83'	Report	Diabaté 7'; Saivet 43'; Biyogo Poko 74'

16 July 2015 Friendly	Bordeaux (France)	0–0	(France) Angers
18:00 CEST (UTC+02:00)		Report

17 July 2015 Friendly	Bordeaux (France)	1–1	(France) Guingamp
18:00 CEST (UTC+02:00)	Maulun 20'	Report	Bègue 64'

23 July 2015 Friendly	Bordeaux (France)	2–0	(France) Clermont	Bergerac, France
18:00 CEST (UTC+02:00)	Diabaté 19'; Zinga 88'	Report		Stadium: Stade Gaston Simounet

== Competitions ==
=== Ligue 1 ===
==== League table ====
Pos	Team	Pld	W	D	L	GF	GA	GD	Pts
9	Angers	38	13	11	14	40	38	+2	50
10	Bastia	38	14	8	16	36	42	−6	50
11	Bordeaux	38	12	14	12	50	57	−7	50
12	Montpellier	38	14	7	17	49	47	+2	49
13	Marseille	38	10	18	10	48	42	+6	48

Source: Ligue 1, Soccerway
Rules for classification: 1) Points; 2) Goal difference; 3) Goals scored; 4) Head-to-head points; 5) Head-to-head goal difference; 6) Fairplay ranking.

==== Results summary ====
Overall								Home						Away					
Pld	W	D	L	GF	GA	GD	Pts	W	D	L	GF	GA	GD	W	D	L	GF	GA	GD
38	12	14	12	50	57	−7	50	8	7	4	27	20	+7	4	7	8	23	37	−14

Last updated: 22 August 2016.
Source: Competitive matches

==== Results by round ====
Round	1	2	3	4	5	6	7	8	9	10	11	12	13	14	15	16	17	18	19	20	21	22	23	24	25	26	27	28	29	30	31	32	33	34	35	36	37	38
Ground	H	A	A	H	A	H	A	H	A	H	H	A	H	A	H	A	H	A	H	A	H	A	H	A	H	A	H	A	H	A	H	A	A	H	H	A	H	A
Result	L	D	D	W	D	D	L	W	L	D	W	L	W	D	L	L	W	D	D	W	W	D	L	L	L	W	D	L	D	L	D	W	D	L	D	W	W	L
Position	15	15	14	10	12	13	17	12	15	14	13	14	11	13	14	17	12	14	14	12	10	10	7	11	11	9	10	12	13	14	14	12	12	13	11	11	10	11

Source: Ligue1
A = Away; H = Home; W = Win; D = Draw; L = Loss
Notes: Match 35 versus Paris Saint-Germain was rescheduled to 11 May 2016

==== Matches ====
Win Draw Loss

9 August 2015 1	Bordeaux	1–2	Reims	Bordeaux
17:00 CEST (UTC+02:00)	Guilbert (yellow card) 37'; Khazri 41'; Poundjé (yellow card) 62'; Yamberé (yellow card) 88'	Report	Traoré (yellow card) 18' de Préville 80'; Charbonnier (yellow card) 84'; Siebatcheu 87'	Stadium: Nouveau Stade de Bordeaux; Attendance: 31,583; Referee: Ruddy Buquet

15 August 2015 2	Saint-Étienne	1–1	Bordeaux	Saint-Étienne
17:00 CEST (UTC+02:00)	Bahebeck (yellow card) 39'; Clément (yellow card) 39'; Hamouma 58'	Report	Chantôme (yellow card) 51'; Saivet 90+1'	Stadium: Stade Geoffroy-Guichard; Attendance: 34,063; Referee: Nicolas Rainville

23 August 2015 3	Lille	0–0	Bordeaux	Villeneuve d'Ascq
14:00 CEST (UTC+02:00)	Bauthéac (yellow card) 52'	Report	Poundjé (yellow card) 30'; Touré (yellow card) 40'; Pallois (yellow card) 60'; Yamberé (yellow card) 63'; Chantôme (yellow card) 78'	Stadium: Stade Pierre-Mauroy; Attendance: 28,035; Referee: Lionel Jaffredo

30 August 2015 4	Bordeaux	2–0	Nantes	Bordeaux
17:00 CEST (UTC+02:00)	Chantôme (yellow card) 22'; Crivelli (yellow card) 36'; Khazri 45+2'; Yambéré (yellow card) 54'; Gajić 87'	Report	Dubois (yellow card) 36'; Lenjani (yellow card) 45+4' (yellow-red card); B. Touré (yellow card) 65'	Stadium: Nouveau Stade de Bordeaux; Attendance: 26,307; Referee: Clément Turpin

11 September 2015 5	Paris Saint-Germain	2–2	Bordeaux	Paris
20:30 CEST (UTC+02:00)	Cavani 27', 34', (yellow card) 0'; Aurier (yellow card) 56'	Report	Maurice-Belay (yellow card) 0'; Trapp 31' (o.g.); Saivet (yellow card) 32' (yellow-red card) 77'; Biyogo Poko (yellow card) 71'; Khazri 79'	Stadium: Parc de Princes; Attendance: 46,860; Referee: Antony Gautier

20 September 2015 6	Bordeaux	1–1	Toulouse	Bordeaux
14:00 CEST (UTC+02:00)	Pallois (yellow card) 18'; Biyogo Poko (yellow card) 56'; Crivelli 89'	Report	Regattin 23', (yellow card) 57'; Bodiger (yellow card) 45+1'; Trejo (red card) 77'	Stadium: Nouveau Stade de Bordeaux; Attendance: 20,650; Referee: Mikael Lesage

23 September 2015 7	Nice	6–1	Bordeaux	Nice
19:00 CEST (UTC+02:00)	Germain 33'; Le Bihan 42'; Pallois 51' (o.g.); Ben Arfa 68', 75'; A. Mendy 84'	Report	Plašil 6'; Khazri (yellow card) 14'; Crivelli (red card) 50'	Stadium: Allianz Riviera; Attendance: 13,686; Referee: Nicolas Rainville

26 September 2015 8	Bordeaux	3–1	Lyon	Bordeaux
20:00 CEST (UTC+02:00)	Khazri 17'; Chantôme (yellow card) 26'; Plašil 40'; Pablo 45+2', (yellow card) 71'	Report	Beauvue 78'	Stadium: Nouveau Stade de Bordeaux; Attendance: 26,593; Referee: Benoît Millot

4 October 2015 9	Lorient	3–2	Bordeaux	Lorient
17:00 CEST (UTC+02:00)	Moukandjo 47'; Waris 64' (pen.); Touré 79'; Gassama (red card) 82'	Report	Rolán 38'; Poko (yellow card) 60' (yellow-red card) 82'; Poundjé (yellow card) 79'; Ounas 89'	Stadium: Stade du Moustoir; Attendance: 10,407; Referee: Clément Turpin

18 October 2015 10	Bordeaux	0–0	Montpellier	Bordeaux
17:00 CEST (UTC+02:00)	Ounas (yellow card) 38'; Saivet (yellow card) 45+2'; Maurice-Belay (yellow card) 84'; Sané (yellow card) 90+2'	Report	Deplagne (yellow card) 41'; Rémy (yellow card) 90+2'	Stadium: Nouveau Stade de Bordeaux; Attendance: 23,881; Referee: Bartolomeu Varela

25 October 2015 11	Bordeaux	1–0	Troyes	Bordeaux
17:00 CET (UTC+01:00)	Sané (yellow card) 58'; Ounas 78'	Report	Ayasse (yellow card) 23'; Mavinga (yellow card) 35'; Darbion (yellow card) 75'; Jonathan Martins Pereira (yellow card) 77'	Stadium: Nouveau Stade de Bordeaux; Attendance: 21,082; Referee: Saïd Ennjimi

31 October 2015 12	Gazélec Ajaccio	2–0	Bordeaux	Ajaccio
20:00 CET (UTC+01:00)	Larbi 44' 68'; Filippi (yellow card) 52' (yellow-red card); Đoković (yellow card) 56'; Martinez (yellow card) 61'; Maury (yellow card) 73'	Report	Rolán (yellow card) 35'; Crivelli (yellow card) 61'; Poko (yellow card) 74'; Saivet (yellow card) 78'	Stadium: Stade Ange Casanova; Attendance: 3,628; Referee: Hakim Ben El Hadj

8 November 2015 13	Bordeaux	3–1	Monaco	Bordeaux
21:00 CET (UTC+01:00)	Poko (yellow card) 30'; Maurice-Belay 36'; Yambéré 40'; Plašil 48'; Khazri (yellow card) 65'	Report	Hélder Costa 23'; El Shaarawy (yellow card) 66'; Fabinho (yellow card) 72'	Stadium: Nouveau Stade de Bordeaux; Attendance: 21,090; Referee: Benoît Millot

22 November 2015 14	Rennes	2–2	Bordeaux	Rennes
17:00 CET (UTC+01:00)	Dembélé 32'; Grosicki 75'; Sio (yellow card) 87'; Armand (yellow card) 90'	Report	Khazri (yellow card) 23'; Crivelli 41' (yellow card) 90'; Contento 78'; Pallois (red card) 90'	Stadium: Roazhon Park; Attendance: 23,289; Referee: Sébastien Moreira

29 November 2015 15	Bordeaux	1–4	Caen	Bordeaux
17:00 CET (UTC+01:00)	Saivet (yellow card) 16'; Sané (yellow card) 55'; Chantôme (yellow card) 62'; Poko (yellow card) 75' (yellow-red card); Ounas (yellow card) 90'; Crivelli 90'	Report	Ben Youssef 6'; Alhadhur (yellow card) 27'; Da Silva 56'; Carrasso 61' (o.g.); Delort 77'; Adéoti (yellow card) 82'	Stadium: Nouveau Stade de Bordeaux; Attendance: 18,830; Referee: Tony Chapron

2 December 2015 16	Bastia	1–0	Bordeaux	Furiani
19:00 CET (UTC+01:00)	Palmieri (yellow card) 51'; Raspentino 88' (yellow card) 89'	Report	Plašil (yellow card) 62'	Stadium: Stade Armand Cesari; Attendance: 10,135; Referee: Fredy Fautrel

6 December 2015 17	Bordeaux	1–0	Guingamp	Bordeaux
17:00 CET (UTC+01:00)	Yambéré 62'; Khazri (yellow card) 90+4'	Report	Dos Santos (yellow card) 61'; Privat (yellow card) 87'	Stadium: Nouveau Stade de Bordeaux; Attendance: 22,606; Referee: Clément Turpin

13 December 2015 18	Angers	1–1	Bordeaux	Angers
17:00 CET (UTC+01:00)	Angoula (yellow card) 63'; Thomas 83'	Report	Biyogo Poko (yellow card) 22'; Crivelli (yellow card) 37'; Rolán 40'	Stadium: Stade Jean-Bouin; Attendance: 13,702; Referee: Benoît Millot

20 December 2015 19	Bordeaux	1–1	Marseille	Bordeaux
21:00 CET (UTC+01:00)	Khazri 57' (yellow card) 90+1'; Contento (yellow card) 90+3'; Poko	Report	Nkoulou (yellow card) 12'; Romao 56', (yellow card) 90+1'; Barrada (yellow card) 62'	Stadium: Nouveau Stade de Bordeaux; Attendance: 39,672; Referee: Benoît Bastien

9 January 2016 20	Montpellier	0–1	Bordeaux	Montpellier
20:00 CET (UTC+01:00)	Yatabaré (yellow card) 39'; Rémy (yellow card) 41'	Report	Diabaté 16'; Khazri (yellow card) 41'	Stadium: Stade de la Mosson; Attendance: 10,603; Referee: Clément Turpin

16 January 2016 21	Bordeaux	1–0	Lille	Bordeaux
20:00 CET (UTC+01:00)	Poko (yellow card) 48'; Diabaté 51'; Chantôme (yellow card) 58'	Report	Mavuba (yellow card) 84'	Stadium: Nouveau Stade de Bordeaux; Attendance: 21,207; Referee: Lionel Jaffredo

23 January 2016 22	Nantes	2–2	Bordeaux	Nantes
20:00 CET (UTC+01:00)	Sigþórsson 1'; Bedoya 30'; Djidji (yellow card) 49'; Thomasson (yellow card) 90+6'	Report	Biyogo Poko (yellow card) 41'; Khazri (yellow card) 54'; Ounas (yellow card) 66'; Yamberé (yellow card) 90+6'; Diabaté 84'; Cana 90+4' (o.g.)	Stadium: Stade de la Beaujoire; Attendance: 21,893; Referee: Tony Chapron

31 January 2016 23	Bordeaux	4–0	Rennes	Bordeaux
17:00 CET (UTC+01:00)	Diabaté 29', 51'; Guilbert (yellow card) 49'; Contento (yellow card) 59'; Rolan 67'; Touré 90+2'	Report	André (yellow card) 71'	Stadium: Nouveau Stade de Bordeaux; Attendance: 19,883; Referee: Mikael Lesage

3 February 2016 24	Lyon	3–0	Bordeaux	Lyon
19:00 CET (UTC+01:00)	Lacazette (yellow card) 40' (goal) 41', 87'; Ferri (yellow card) 81'; Kalulu (yellow card) 90+3'	Report	Vada (yellow card) 7'; Chantôme (yellow card) 24'; Crivelli (yellow card) 76'; Rolan (yellow card) 76'	Stadium: Parc Olympique Lyonnais; Attendance: 30,143; Referee: Fredy Fautrel

7 February 2016 25	Bordeaux	1–4	Saint-Étienne	Bordeaux
17:00 CET (UTC+01:00)	Arambarri (yellow card) 2'; Yambéré 10', (yellow card) 84'; Crivelli (yellow card) 22'; Contento (yellow card) 90+2'; Diabaté (red card) 90+2'ba	Report	Pajot 4'; Tannane 7'; Cohade (yellow card) 18'; Søderlund 70'; Roux 75'	Stadium: Nouveau Stade de Bordeaux; Attendance: 34,377; Referee: Benoît Bastien

13 February 2016 26	Guingamp	2–4	Bordeaux	Guingamp
20:00 CET (UTC+01:00)	Giresse 42'; Coco 58'; Privat (yellow card) 90+3'	Report	Ounas 19'; Rolán 37'; Chantôme 68'; Diabaté 89'	Stadium: Stade du Roudourou; Attendance: 13,177; Referee: Hakim Ben El Hadj

19 February 2016 27	Bordeaux	0–0	Nice	Bordeaux
20:30 CET (UTC+01:00)		Report	Koziello (yellow card) 44'; Ranieri (yellow card) 90+1'	Stadium: Nouveau Stade de Bordeaux; Attendance: 23,641; Referee: Nicolas Rainville

27 February 2016 28	Reims	4–1	Bordeaux	Reims
20:00 CET (UTC+01:00)	Mandi 23'; Bifouma 34'; Devaux (yellow card) 37'; Conte (yellow card) 50'; Charbonnier (yellow card) 67'; Bangoura 89'	Report	Ounas (yellow card) 30' (goal) 69'; Chantôme (yellow card) 64'	Stadium: Stade Auguste Delaune; Attendance: 11,286; Referee: François Letexier

5 March 2016 29	Bordeaux	1–1	Gazélec Ajaccio	Bordeaux
20:00 CET (UTC+01:00)	Pablo (yellow card) 9'; Diabaté 38' (pen.); Sané (yellow card) 63'	Report	Touré (yellow card) 4'; Mayi (yellow card) 58'; Larbi 89'	Stadium: Matmut Atlantique; Attendance: 17,603; Referee: Johan Hamel

12 March 2016 30	Toulouse	4–0	Bordeaux	Toulouse
20:00 CET (UTC+01:00)	Ben Yedder 5', 50' (pen.); Braithwaite (yellow card) 51' (goal) 86' (pen.); Diop (yellow card) 81'; Tisserand (yellow card) 90'; Trejo 90'	Report	Chantôme (yellow card) 25'; Sané (red card) 49'; Biyogo Poko (yellow card) 51'; Ounas (yellow card) 62'	Stadium: Stadium Municipal; Attendance: 12,292; Referee: Stéphane Lannoy

20 March 2016 31	Bordeaux	1–1	Bastia	Bordeaux
20:00 CET (UTC+01:00)	Enzo Crivelli (yellow card) 43'; Crivelli (yellow card) 45'; Contento 82'	Report	Peybernes (yellow card) 45'; Fofana (yellow card) 54'; Ngando 84'	Stadium: Matmut Atlantique; Attendance: 21,927; Referee: Tony Chapron

1 April 2016 32	Monaco	1–2	Bordeaux	Fontvieille
20:30 CEST (UTC+02:00)	Love (yellow card) 90+2'; Guilbert 90+3' (o.g.)	Report	Touré 45+2'; Ounas 56'; Yambéré (yellow card) 90'	Stadium: Stade Louis II; Attendance: 6,852; Referee: Benoît Bastien

9 April 2016 33	Marseille	0–0	Bordeaux	Marseille
21:00 CET (UTC+01:00)	Reik (yellow card) 23'; Nkoulou (yellow card) 59'; Batshuayi (yellow card) 78'	Report	Touré (yellow card) 19'; Pablo (yellow card) 28'	Stadium: Stade Vélodrome; Attendance: 43,344; Referee: Frank Schneider

16 April 2016 34	Bordeaux	1–3	Angers	Bordeaux
20:00 CET (UTC+01:00)	Guilbert (yellow card) 24'; Debuchy (yellow card) 54'; Rolán 70'	Report	Capelle (yellow card) 15'; Traoré (red card) 35'; Ndoye 61'; Yattara 64'; Andreu (yellow card) 69'; Bourillon 87'	Stadium: Matmut Atlantique; Attendance: 24,611; Referee: Ruddy Buquet

30 April 2016 36	Troyes	2–4	Bordeaux	Troyes
19:00 CET (UTC+01:00)	Pi (yellow card) 7'; Jean (yellow card) 23', (goal) 69'; Nivet 56' (pen.), (yellow card) 57'; Court (yellow card) 90+3'	Report	Rolán 14', 72'; Mavinga 41' (o.g.); Gulbert (yellow card) 43'; Diabaté 60'	Stadium: Stade de l'Aube; Attendance: 13,442; Referee: Bartolomeu Varela

7 May 2016 37	Bordeaux	3–0	Lorient	Bordeaux
21:00 CEST (UTC+2)	Malcom 12'; Diabaté 21', 48'	Report	Guerreiro (yellow card) 85'	Stadium: Nouveau Stade de Bordeaux; Attendance: 23,117; Referee: Stéphane Jochem

11 May 2016 35	Bordeaux	1–1	Paris Saint-Germain	Bordeaux
20:30 CEST (UTC+02:00)	Rolán (yellow card) 14'; Pallois 66'	Report	Kurzawa (yellow card) 41'; Moura (yellow card) 47'; Ibrahimović 59'	Stadium: Stade Chaban-Delmas; Attendance: 38,026; Referee: François Letexier

14 May 2016 38	Caen	1–0	Bordeaux	Caen
21:00 CEST (UTC+02:00)	Delort 14' (pen.); Louis (yellow card) 25'	Report	Contento (yellow card) 15'; Plašil (yellow card) 15'; Pallois (yellow card) 28'; Crivelli (yellow card) 72'	Stadium: Stade Michel d'Ornano; Attendance: 19,599; Referee: Tony Chapron

=== Coupe de France ===
3 January 2016 Round of 64	Étoile Fréjus Saint-Raphaël	2–3	Bordeaux	Saint-Raphaël
14:15 CET (UTC+01:00)	Jérémy Grain (yellow card) 22'; Gendrey 32' 54'; Raphaël Delvigne (yellow card) 90'	Summary	Sané (yellow card) 16'; Diabaté 36' 77'; Guilbert (yellow card) 65' (yellow-red card); Rolán 90'	Stadium: Stade Pourcin; Attendance: 1,330; Referee: Johan Hamel

19 January 2016 Round of 32	Angers	1–2	Bordeaux	Angers
18:30 CET (UTC+01:00)	N'Doye (yellow card) 15'; Ketkeophomphone 69' (yellow card) 71'; Moutou (yellow card) 83'	Report	Jussiê 45'; Crivelli 58'; Touré (yellow card) 78'	Stadium: Stade Jean-Bouin; Attendance: 4,484; Referee: Stéphane Lanno

10 February 2016 Round of 16	Bordeaux	3–4 (a.e.t.)	Nantes	Bordeaux
19:00 CET (UTC+01:00)	Crivelli 23'; Biyogo Poko 51'; Touré (yellow card) 72'; Malcolm 98'	Report	Bammou 6'; Sigthorsson 65'; Moimbé (yellow card) 70'; Audel 115' (yellow card) 120'; Bedoya 118'	Stadium: Nouveau Stade de Bordeaux; Attendance: 9,207; Referee: Frank Schneider

=== Coupe de la Ligue ===
16 December 2015 Round of 16	Bordeaux	3–0	Monaco	Bordeaux
17:00 CET (UTC+01:00)	Ounas 16'; Rolán 57'; Saivet 88'	Report	Boschilia (yellow card) 71'; Raggi (yellow card) 78'	Stadium: Stade Chaban-Delmas; Attendance: 15,163; Referee: (France) Frank Schneider

12 January 2016 Quarter-final	Bordeaux	2–0	Lorient	Bordeaux
21:00 CET (UTC+01:00)	Plašil 44'; Chaigneau 58' (o.g.); Crivelli (yellow card) 90'	Summary		Stadium: Stade Chaban-Delmas; Attendance: 8,676; Referee: (France) Nicolas Rainville

26 January 2016 Semi-final	Lille	5–1	Bordeaux	Villeneuve d'Ascq
21:00 CET (UTC+01:00)	Benzia 7'; Sané 41' (o.g.); Soumaoro 45'; Obbadi (yellow card) 45+1'; Bautheac 56'; Boufal 90+3'	Report	Chantôme 33'; Khazri (yellow card) 44'; Sané (yellow card) 51'	Stadium: Stade Pierre-Mauroy; Attendance: 19,168; Referee: Clément Turpin

=== UEFA Europa League ===
==== Third Qualifying Round ====
30 July 2015 1st Leg	Bordeaux (France)	3–0	(Cyprus) AEK Larnaca	Bordeaux, France
20:30 CEST (UTC+02:00)	Poko 53'; Diabaté 74' (pen.); Maurice-Belay 80', (yellow card) 81'; Saivet (yellow card) 84'	Report	Ninu (yellow card) 73'	Stadium: Nouveau Stade de Bordeaux; Attendance: 30,174; Referee: Pavle Radovanović (Montenegro)

6 August 2015 2nd Leg	AEK Larnaca (Cyprus)	0–1 (0–4 agg.)	(France) Bordeaux	Larnaca, Cyprus
20:30 EEST (UTC+03:00)	Joan Tomàs (yellow card) 11'; Monteiro (yellow card) 45+3'; Laban (yellow card) 73'; Ortiz (red card) 82'; Boljević (yellow card) 90'; Kanté (yellow card) 90+3'	Report	Khazri (yellow card) 11'; Gajić (yellow card) 13'; Kiese Thelin 29', (yellow card) 82'; Chantôme (yellow card) 45', (red card) 45'; Contento (yellow card) 48'; Yamberé (yellow card) 86'	Stadium: Antonis Papadopoulos Stadium; Attendance: 2,500; Referee: Tobias Stieler (Germany)

==== Play-off Round ====
20 August 2015 1st Leg	Bordeaux (France)	1–0	(Kazakhstan) Kairat	Bordeaux, France
20:30 CEST (UTC+02:00)	Khazri 27'; Crivelli (yellow card) 89'	Report	Islamkhan (yellow card) 45'; Riera (yellow card) 79'; Tymoshchuk (yellow card) 84'	Stadium: Nouveau Stade de Bordeaux; Attendance: 24,795; Referee: Arnold Hunter (Northern Ireland)

27 August 2015 2nd Leg	Kairat (Kazakhstan)	2–1 (2–2 (a) agg.)	(France) Bordeaux	Almaty, Kazakhstan
20:45 OMST (UTC+06:00)	Guilbert 1' (o.g.); Tymoshchuk (yellow card) 38'; Kuat 66'; Bruno Soares (yellow card) 88'	Report	Saivet (yellow card) 21'; Khazri (yellow card) 39'; Yamberé (yellow card) 63'; Crivelli 76', (yellow card) 85'	Stadium: Almaty Ortalyk Stadion; Attendance: 23,800; Referee: Bas Nijhuis (Netherlands)

==== Group stage ====
Pos	Team	Pld	W	D	L	GF	GA	GD	Pts	Qualification	LIV	SIO	RUB	BOR
1	(England) Liverpool	6	2	4	0	6	4	+2	10	Advance to knockout phase	—	1–1	1–1	2–1
2	(Switzerland) Sion	6	2	3	1	5	5	0	9	Advance to knockout phase	0–0	—	2–1	1–1
3	(Russia) Rubin Kazan	6	1	3	2	6	6	0	6		0–1	2–0	—	0–0
4	(France) Bordeaux	6	0	4	2	5	7	−2	4		1–1	0–1	2–2	—

Source: Soccerway
Rules for classification: Group stage tiebreakers

17 September 2015 1	Bordeaux (France)	1–1	(England) Liverpool	Bordeaux, France
19:00 CEST	Chantôme (yellow card) 38'; Jussiê 81'	Report	Touré (yellow card) 12'; Lallana 65'	Stadium: Nouveau Stade de Bordeaux; Attendance: 35,328; Referee: Alberto Undiano Mallenco (Spain)

1 October 2015 2	Rubin Kazan (Russia)	0–0	(France) Bordeaux	Kazan, Russia
21:05 CEST (UTC+02:00)	Portnyagin (yellow card) 46'; Kislyak (yellow card) 75' (yellow-red card) 80'	Report	Crivelli (yellow card) 56'; Contento (yellow card) 61'	Stadium: Kazan Arena; Attendance: 17,642; Referee: Gediminas Mažeika (Lithuania)

22 October 2015 3	Bordeaux (France)	0–1	(Switzerland) Sion	Bordeaux, France
21:05 CEST (UTC+02:00)	Chantôme (yellow card) 21'; Khazri (yellow card) 77' (yellow-red card) 86'; Crivelli (yellow card) 81'; Sané (yellow card) 88'; Ounas (yellow card) 90+3'	Report	Lacroix 21'; Fernandes (yellow card) 26'; Jagne (yellow card) 45+1'; Ziegler (yellow card) 79'; Konaté (yellow card) 88'	Stadium: Nouveau Stade de Bordeaux; Referee: Aleksandar Stavrev (Macedonia)

5 November 2015 4	Sion (Switzerland)	1–1	(France) Bordeaux	Sion, Switzerland
19:00 CET (UTC+01:00)	Ndoye (yellow card) 4'; Assifuah (yellow card) 42'; Chantôme 90+4' (o.g.)	Report	Yambéré (yellow card) 37'; Touré 67'; Carrasso (yellow card) 74'	Stadium: Stade Tourbillon; Attendance: 9,000; Referee: (Slovakia) Ivan Kružliak

26 November 2015 5	Liverpool (England)	2–1	(France) Bordeaux	Liverpool, England
21:05 CET (UTC+01:00)	Milner 38' (pen.); Benteke 45+1' (yellow card) 86'; Lucas Leiva (yellow card) 60'; Ibe (yellow card) 62'	Report	Saivet 33'; Sané (yellow card) 37'; Contento (yellow card) 88'	Stadium: Anfield; Attendance: 42,525; Referee: (Israel) Alon Yefet

10 December 2015 6	Bordeaux (France)	2–2	(Russia) Rubin Kazan	Bordeaux, France
19:00 CET (UTC+01:00)	Guilbert (yellow card) 30' (yellow-red card); Laborde 58'; Yambéré (yellow card) 61'; Rolán 63'	Report	Kanunnikov 31'; Kuzmin (yellow card) 39'; Nabiullin (yellow card) 54'; Ustinov 76'	Stadium: Nouveau Stade de Bordeaux; Attendance: 13,640; Referee: (Scotland) John Beaton

== Goalscorers ==
As of match played 22 August 2016

Place	Position	Nation	Number	Name	Ligue 1	Coupe de France	Coupe de la Ligue	UEFA Europa League	Total
1	FW	(Mali)	14	Cheick Diabaté	10	2	0	1	13
2	FW	(Uruguay)	9	Diego Rolán	7	1	1	1	10
3	MF	(Tunisia)	24	Wahbi Khazri	5	0	0	1	6
3	MF	(France)	33	Adam Ounas	5	0	1	0	6
3	FW	(France)	27	Enzo Crivelli	3	2	0	1	6
4	MF	(Czech Republic)	18	Jaroslav Plašil	3	0	1	0	4
4				Own goals	3	0	1	0	4
5	DF	(France)	21	Cédric Yamberé	3	0	0	0	3
5	FW	(France)	13	Thomas Touré	2	0	0	1	3
5	MF	(Senegal)	10	Henri Saivet	1	0	1	1	3
6	DF	(Germany)	3	Diego Contento	2	0	0	0	2
6	MF	(France)	19	Nicolas Maurice-Belay	1	0	0	1	2
6	FW	(Brazil)	25	Malcom	1	1	0	0	2
6	MF	(France)	11	Clément Chantôme	1	0	1	0	2
6	FW	(Brazil)	20	Jussiê	0	1	0	1	2
6	MF	(Gabon)	17	André Biyogo Poko	0	1	0	1	2
7	DF	(Serbia)	2	Milan Gajić	1	0	0	0	1
7	DF	(Brazil)	4	Pablo	1	0	0	0	1
7	DF	(France)	5	Nicolas Pallois	1	0	0	0	1
7	FW	(Sweden)	12	Isaac Kiese Thelin	0	0	0	1	1
7	FW	(France)	—	Gaëtan Laborde	0	0	0	1	1
				TOTALS	47	8	5	11	71
