= 2013–14 Olympique de Marseille season =

Marseille
2013–14 season
- Chairman: Vincent Labrune
- Manager: Élie Baup (until 7 December 2013); José Anigo (until 17 May 2014)
- Stadium: Stade Vélodrome
- Ligue 1: 6th
- Coupe de France: Round of 32
- Coupe de la Ligue: Quarter-finals
- UEFA Champions League: Group stage
- Top goalscorer: League: André-Pierre Gignac (16 goals); All: André-Pierre Gignac (22 goals)
- Highest home attendance: 44,995 v AS Monaco FC
- Lowest home attendance: 8,245 v OGC Nice
- Average home league attendance: 37,842
Home colours	Away colours	Third colours

The 2013–14 season was Olympique de Marseille's 108th season in existence and the club's 18th consecutive season in the top flight of French football, Ligue 1, where they finished 6th. Marseille also participated in the Coupe de France and the Coupe de la Ligue, where they were eliminated in the round of 32 and quarter-finals respectively. They also participated in the UEFA Champions League, where they were eliminated in the group stage.

== Players ==
French teams are limited to four players without EU citizenship. Hence, the squad list includes only the principal nationality of each player; several non-European players on the squad have dual citizenship with an EU country. Also, players from the ACP countries—countries in Africa, the Caribbean, and the Pacific that are signatories to the Cotonou Agreement—are not counted against non-EU quotas due to the Kolpak ruling.

=== Current squad ===
As of 6 January 2014

Note: Flags indicate national team as defined under FIFA eligibility rules; some limited exceptions apply. Players may hold more than one non-FIFA nationality.

No.	Pos.	Nation	Player
1	GK	FRA	Gennaro Bracigliano
3	DF	CMR	Nicolas N'Koulou
4	DF	BRA	Lucas Mendes
7	MF	FRA	Benoît Cheyrou
8	MF	GAB	Alexander N'Doumbou
9	FW	FRA	André-Pierre Gignac
10	MF	GHA	André Ayew
12	MF	GHA	Kevin Osei
13	MF	FRA	Mario Lemina
14	MF	FRA	Florian Thauvin
15	DF	FRA	Jérémy Morel
16	GK	FRA	Brice Samba

No.	Pos.	Nation	Player
17	MF	FRA	Dimitri Payet
19	DF	FRA	Laurent Abergel
20	MF	TOG	Alaixys Romao
21	DF	SEN	Souleymane Diawara
22	MF	NZL	Bill Tuiloma
23	DF	FRA	Benjamin Mendy
24	DF	FRA	Rod Fanni
25	MF	FRA	Gianelli Imbula
26	DF	CIV	Brice Dja Djédjé
28	MF	FRA	Mathieu Valbuena
29	FW	TUN	Saber Khalifa
30	GK	FRA	Steve Mandanda (captain)

==== Out on loan ====
Note: Flags indicate national team as defined under FIFA eligibility rules; some limited exceptions apply. Players may hold more than one non-FIFA nationality.

No.	Pos.	Nation	Player
--	DF	TOG	Sénah Mango (at US Luzenac)
--	MF	FRA	Larry Azouni (at FC Lorient)
--	MF	ALG	Foued Kadir (at Stade Rennais)
--	MF	FRA	Morgan Amalfitano (at West Bromwich Albion)

No.	Pos.	Nation	Player
--	FW	GHA	Jordan Ayew (at Sochaux)
--	FW	SEN	Modou Sougou (at Evian TG)
--	FW	FRA	Florian Raspentino (at SC Bastia)
--	FW	FRA	Billel Omrani (at AC Arles-Avignon)

==== Reserve squad ====
Note: Flags indicate national team as defined under FIFA eligibility rules; some limited exceptions apply. Players may hold more than one non-FIFA nationality.

No.	Pos.	Nation	Player
--	GK	FRA	Julien Fabri
--	GK	FRA	Ali Yirango
--	GK	FRA	Tommy Rey
--	DF	FRA	Jacques Abardonado
--	DF	FRA	Gaël Andonian
--	DF	FRA	Baptiste Aloè
--	DF	COM	Foued M'Roudjaé
--	DF	FRA	Ricardo Charles
--	DF	FRA	Robin Taillan
--	DF	FRA	Jules Mendy
--	DF	FRA	Kévin Pommier
--	MF	FRA	Momar Bangoura

No.	Pos.	Nation	Player
--	MF	FRA	Thomas Ephestion
--	MF	FRA	Ahmed Nouri
--	MF	FRA	Michel Araai
--	MF	FRA	Jérémy Roland
--	MF	FRA	Jonathan Santiago
--	MF	FRA	Maxime Lopez
--	MF	FRA	Emmanuel Loiacono
--	FW	ALG	Abderrahmane Yousfi
--	FW	CMR	Oumar Diop
--	FW	FRA	Fabrice Apruzesse
--	FW	CIV	Achille Anani

== Competitions ==
=== Ligue 1 ===
==== League table ====
Pos	Team	Pld	W	D	L	GF	GA	GD	Pts	Qualification or relegation
4	Saint-Étienne	38	20	9	9	56	34	+22	69	Qualification for the Europa League play-off round
5	Lyon	38	17	10	11	56	44	+12	61	Qualification for the Europa League third qualifying round
6	Marseille	38	16	12	10	53	40	+13	60	
7	Bordeaux	38	13	14	11	49	43	+6	53	
8	Lorient	38	13	10	15	48	53	−5	49	

Source: Ligue 1
Rules for classification: 1) Points; 2) Goal difference; 3) Number of goals scored

==== Results summary ====
Overall								Home						Away					
Pld	W	D	L	GF	GA	GD	Pts	W	D	L	GF	GA	GD	W	D	L	GF	GA	GD
38	16	12	10	53	40	+13	60	10	3	6	30	20	+10	6	9	4	23	20	+3

Source: Competitive matches

==== Results by round ====
Match	1	2	3	4	5	6	7	8	9	10	11	12	13	14	15	16	17	18	19	20	21	22	23	24	25	26	27	28	29	30	31	32	33	34	35	36	37	38
Ground	A	H	A	H	A	H	A	H	A	H	A	H	H	A	H	A	H	A	H	A	H	A	H	A	H	A	H	A	H	A	A	H	A	H	A	H	A	H
Result	W	W	W	L	D	D	W	W	L	L	L	D	W	W	W	L	L	D	D	W	W	L	L	W	D	W	L	L	D	D	D	W	W	D	D	W	D	W
Position	3	3	1	2	4	4	3	3	4	4	6	4	4	4	4	4	4	6	6	5	5	5	5	5	5	5	5	6	6	6	6	6	6	6	6	6	6	6

Source: Ligue 1
A = Away; H = Home; W = Win; D = Draw; L = Loss
Notes: Match 21 versus Valenciennes was postponed until 29 January 2014 and therefore should appear between matches 22 & 23.

==== Matches ====
Win Draw Loss

11 August 2013 1	Guingamp	1–3	Marseille	Guingamp
21:00 CEST	Yatabaré 74'	Report	Gignac 2'; Payet 4', 16'	Stadium: Stade du Roudourou; Attendance: 18,155; Referee: Saïd Ennjimi

17 August 2013 2	Marseille	2–0	Evian	Marseille
17:00 CEST	Gignac 16'; Payet 67'	Report		Stadium: Stade Vélodrome; Attendance: 42,524; Referee: Bartolomeu Varela

24 August 2013 3	Valenciennes	0–1	Marseille	Valenciennes
17:00 CEST		Report	Gignac 88'	Stadium: Stade du Hainaut; Attendance: 19,007; Referee: Lionel Jaffredo

1 September 2013 4	Marseille	1–2	Monaco	Marseille
21:00 CEST	L. Mendes 43'	Report	Falcao 47'; Rivière 79'	Stadium: Stade Vélodrome; Attendance: 44,995; Referee: Ruddy Buquet

14 September 2013 5	Toulouse	1–1	Marseille	Toulouse
17:00 CEST	Ben Yedder 66'	Report	L. Mendes 84'	Stadium: Stadium Municipal; Attendance: 20,111; Referee: Stéphane Lannoy

21 September 2013 6	Bastia	0–0	Marseille	Bastia
17:00 CEST		Report		Stadium: Stade Armand Cesari; Attendance: 14,989; Referee: Laurent Duhamel

24 September 2013 7	Marseille	2–1	Saint-Étienne	Marseille
21:00 CEST	Mendy 22'; Imbula 26'	Report	Ghoulam 32' (pen.)	Stadium: Stade Vélodrome; Attendance: 36,073; Referee: Saïd Ennjimi

28 September 2013 8	Lorient	0–2	Marseille	Lorient
14:00 CEST		Report	Valbuena 58'; A. Ayew 90+1'	Stadium: Stade du Moustoir; Attendance: 15,340; Referee: Olivier Thual

6 October 2013 9	Marseille	1–2	Paris Saint-Germain	Marseille
21:00 CEST	A. Ayew 34' (pen.)	Report	Motta (red card) 31'; Maxwell 45'; Ibrahimović 66' (pen.)	Stadium: Stade Vélodrome; Attendance: 44,391; Referee: Clément Turpin

18 October 2013 10	Nice	1–0	Marseille	Nice
21:00 CEST	Cvitanich 40'	Report		Stadium: Allianz Riviera; Attendance: 31,634; Referee: Antony Gautier

26 October 2013 11	Marseille	2–3	Reims	Marseille
17:00 CEST	Thauvin 56'; Gignac 86'	Report	Ayité 34'; Albaek 37'; Oniangue 90+1'	Stadium: Stade Vélodrome; Attendance: 40,532; Referee: Amaury Delerue

2 November 2013 12	Rennes	1–1	Marseille	Rennes
17:00 CET	Oliveira 9'	Report	J. Ayew 16'	Stadium: Stade de la Route de Lorient; Attendance: 26,785; Referee: Alexandre Castro

10 November 2013 13	Marseille	2–1	Sochaux	Marseille
17:00 CET	Thauvin 5'; Gignac 83' (pen.)	Report	Mayuka 60'	Stadium: Stade Vélodrome; Attendance: 37,583; Referee: Ruddy Buquet

22 November 2013 14	Ajaccio	1–3	Marseille	Ajaccio
20:30 CET	Perozo 31'	Report	Payet 27'; Gignac 39'; Thauvin 58'	Stadium: Stade François Coty; Attendance: 6,846; Referee: Lionel Jaffredo

29 November 2013 15	Marseille	2–0	Montpellier	Marseille
20:30 CET	Thauvin 36'; Khalifa 90+3'	Report		Stadium: Stade Vélodrome; Attendance: 35,045; Referee: Fredy Fautrel

3 December 2013 16	Lille	1–0	Marseille	Villeneuve-d'Ascq
19:00 CET	Roux 90+2'	Report		Stadium: Stade Pierre-Mauroy; Attendance: 46,089; Referee: Laurent Duhamel

6 December 2013 17	Marseille	0–1	Nantes	Marseille
20:30 CET		Report	Bedoya 16'	Stadium: Stade Vélodrome; Attendance: 36,622; Referee: Clément Turpin

15 December 2013 18	Lyon	2–2	Marseille	Lyon
21:00 CET	Lacazette 17'; Gomis 44'	Report	Gignac 45+1'; Thauvin 79'	Stadium: Stade de Gerland; Attendance: 34,218; Referee: Ruddy Buquet

22 December 2013 19	Marseille	2–2	Bordeaux	Marseille
21:00 CET	Romao 73'; Gignac 74'	Report	Jussiê 34'; Maurice-Belay 66'	Stadium: Stade Vélodrome; Attendance: 38,720; Referee: Benoît Bastien

12 January 2014 20	Evian	1–2	Marseille	Annecy
17:00 CET	Sougou 15'	Report	Cheyrou 22'; Gignac 38'	Stadium: Parc des Sports; Attendance: 14,746; Referee: Philippe Kalt

26 January 2014 22	Monaco	2–0	Marseille	Fontvieille, Monaco
21:00 CET	Germain 41'; Rivière 57'	Report		Stadium: Stade Louis II; Attendance: 11,284; Referee: Clément Turpin

29 January 2014 21	Marseille	2–1	Valenciennes	Marseille
19:00 CET	Gignac 31'; Thauvin 63'	Report	Masuaku 37'	Stadium: Stade Vélodrome; Attendance: 35,741; Referee: Bartolomeu Varela

2 February 2014 23	Marseille	2–2	Toulouse	Marseille
21:00 CET	Payet 7'; Valbuena 40'	Report	Ben Yedder 11'; Aurier 60'	Stadium: Stade Vélodrome; Attendance: 34,626; Referee: Saïd Ennjimi

8 February 2014 24	Marseille	3–0	Bastia	Marseille
17:00 CET	Payet 13', 25'; Gignac 55'	Report		Stadium: Stade Vélodrome; Attendance: 36,240; Referee: Benoît Millot

16 February 2014 25	Saint-Étienne	1–1	Marseille	Saint-Étienne
21:00 CET	Brandão 90+2'	Report	Nkoulou 64'	Stadium: Stade Geoffroy-Guichard; Attendance: 32,024; Referee: Fredy Fautrel

22 February 2014 26	Marseille	1–0	Lorient	Marseille
17:00 CET	Gignac 82'	Report		Stadium: Stade Vélodrome; Attendance: 38,104; Referee: Amaury Delerue

2 March 2014 27	Paris Saint-Germain	2–0	Marseille	Paris
21:00 CET	Maxwell 50'; Cavani 79'	Report		Stadium: Parc des Princes; Attendance: 45,483; Referee: Ruddy Buquet

7 March 2014 28	Marseille	0–1	Nice	Marseille
20:30 CET		Report	Eysseric 66'	Stadium: Stade Vélodrome; Attendance: 36,083; Referee: Laurent Duhamel

14 March 2014 29	Reims	1–1	Marseille	Reims
20:30 CET	Devaux 67'	Report	Gignac 80'	Stadium: Stade Auguste-Delaune; Attendance: 20,513; Referee: Benoît Bastien

22 March 2014 30	Marseille	0–1	Rennes	Marseille
17:00 CET		Report	Doucouré 76'	Stadium: Stade Vélodrome; Attendance: 36,883; Referee: Fredy Fautrel

29 March 2014 31	Sochaux	1–1	Marseille	Sochaux
17:00 CEST	Sunzu 25'	Report	Nkoulou 90'	Stadium: Stade Auguste Bonal; Attendance: 16,328; Referee: Bartolomeu Varela

4 April 2014 32	Marseille	3–1	Ajaccio	Marseille
20:30 CEST	A. Ayew 4', 60', 76'	Report	Tallo 61'	Stadium: Stade Vélodrome; Attendance: 34,992; Referee: Stéphane Lannoy

11 April 2014 33	Montpellier	2–3	Marseille	Montpellier
20:30 CEST	Cabella 48'; Sanson 79'	Report	Valbuena 41'; Gignac 58'; Payet 89'	Stadium: Stade de la Mosson; Attendance: 19,757; Referee: Wilfried Bien

20 April 2014 34	Marseille	0–0	Lille	Marseille
21:00 CEST		Report		Stadium: Stade Vélodrome; Attendance: 39,545; Referee: Tony Chapron

25 April 2014 35	Nantes	1–1	Marseille	Nantes
20:30 CEST	Gakpe 64'	Report	Thauvin 30'	Stadium: Stade de la Beaujoire; Attendance: 39,959; Referee: Benoît Bastien

4 May 2014 36	Marseille	4–2	Lyon	Marseille
21:00 CEST	Diawara 12'; Thauvin 26'; Gignac 48', 56'	Report	Mvuemba 40'; Gomis 82'	Stadium: Stade Vélodrome; Attendance: 37,842; Referee: Lionel Jaffredo

10 May 2014 37	Bordeaux	1–1	Marseille	Bordeaux
21:00 CEST	Diabaté 66'	Report	Cheyrou 32'	Stadium: Stade Chaban-Delmas; Attendance: 31,555; Referee: Benoît Millot

17 May 2014 38	Marseille	1–0	Guingamp	Marseille
21:00 CEST	A. Ayew 51'	Report		Stadium: Stade Vélodrome; Attendance: 35,959; Referee: Amaury Delerue

=== Coupe de France ===
5 January 2014 Round of 64	Marseille	2–0 (a.e.t.)	Reims	Marseille
20:45	Gignac 94', 115'			Stadium: Stade Vélodrome; Attendance: 5,000; Referee: Wilfried Bien

21 January 2014 Round of 32	Marseille	4–5	Nice	Marseille
21:00	Gignac 4', 58'; Thauvin 24'; Diawara 90+2'		Bosetti 5'; Maupay 18'; Diawara 45' (o.g.); Brüls 51' (pen.); Abriel 88'	Stadium: Stade Vélodrome; Attendance: 8,240; Referee: Stéphane Lannoy

=== Coupe de la Ligue ===
18 December 2013 Round of 16	Marseille	2–1	Toulouse	Marseille
20:55 CET	Mendy 13'; Gignac 29' (pen.)	Report	Spajić 42'	Stadium: Stade Vélodrome; Attendance: 35,621; Referee: Lionel Jaffredo

15 January 2014 Quarter-final	Lyon	2–1	Marseille	Lyon
20:55 CET	Gourcuff 24'; Gomis 74'	Report	Gignac 89' (pen.)	Stadium: Stade de Gerland; Attendance: 27,338; Referee: Antony Gautier

=== UEFA Champions League ===
==== Group stage ====
Pos	Team	Pld	W	D	L	GF	GA	GD	Pts	Qualification	DOR	ARS	NAP	MAR
1	(Germany) Borussia Dortmund	6	4	0	2	11	6	+5	12 (Note: Tied on head-to-head points (6). Head-to-head goal difference: Borussia Dortmund +1, Arsenal 0, Napoli −1.)	Advance to knockout phase	—	0–1	3–1	3–0
2	(England) Arsenal	6	4	0	2	8	5	+3	12	Advance to knockout phase	1–2	—	2–0	2–0
3	(Italy) Napoli	6	4	0	2	10	9	+1	12	Transfer to Europa League	2–1	2–0	—	3–2
4	(France) Marseille	6	0	0	6	5	14	−9	0		1–2	1–2	1–2	—

Source: UEFA
Notes:

18 September 2013 1	Marseille (France)	1–2	(England) Arsenal	Marseille, France
20:45 CEST	N'Koulou (yellow card) 41'; J. Ayew 90+3' (pen.)	Report	Ramsey (yellow card) 54', (goal) 84'; Walcott 64'	Stadium: Stade Vélodrome; Attendance: 38,380; Referee: Olegário Benquerença (Portugal)

1 October 2013 2	Borussia Dortmund (Germany)	3–0	(France) Marseille	Dortmund, Germany
20:45 CEST	Lewandowski 19', 80' (pen.); Reus 52'; Subotić (yellow card) 62'; Bender (yellow card) 64'	Report	Romao (yellow card) 51'; Fanni (yellow card) 65'; N'Koulou (yellow card) 76'	Stadium: Signal Iduna Park; Attendance: 65,829; Referee: David Fernández Borbalán (Spain)

22 October 2013 3	Marseille (France)	1–2	(Italy) Napoli	Marseille, France
20:45 CEST	Cheyrou (yellow card) 44'; Payet (yellow card) 45'; A. Ayew 86'; J. Ayew (yellow card) 89'	Report	Callejón 42'; Zapata 67'	Stadium: Stade Vélodrome; Attendance: 39,790; Referee: Cüneyt Çakır (Turkey)

6 November 2013 4	Napoli (Italy)	3–2	(France) Marseille	Naples, Italy
20:45 CET	Inler 22'; Higuaín 24', 75'; Fernández (yellow card) 34'	Report	A. Ayew 10'; Thauvin 64'; Payet (yellow card) 77'; Romao (yellow card) 80'	Stadium: Stadio San Paolo; Attendance: 39,148; Referee: Sergei Karasev (Russia)

26 November 2013 5	Arsenal (England)	2–0	(France) Marseille	London, England
20:45 CET	Wilshere 1', 65'; Özil (penalty missed) 38'	Report	N'Koulou (yellow card) 37'; Morel (yellow card) 38'; Romao (yellow card) 81'	Stadium: Emirates Stadium; Attendance: 59,912; Referee: Antonio Lahoz (Spain)

11 December 2013 6	Marseille (France)	1–2	(Germany) Borussia Dortmund	Marseille, France
20:45 CET	Diawara 14'; Payet (yellow card) 32' (yellow-red card) 34'; Gignac (yellow card) 71'	Report	Lewandowski 4'; Großkreutz 87'; Sarr (yellow card) 90+2'	Stadium: Stade Vélodrome; Attendance: 36,655; Referee: Marijo Strahonja (Croatia)
