= 2012–13 FC Girondins de Bordeaux season =

Bordeaux
2012–13 season
- Chairman: Jean-Louis Triaud
- Manager: Francis Gillot
- Stadium: Stade Chaban-Delmas
- Ligue 1: 7th
- Coupe de France: Winners
- Coupe de la Ligue: Round of 16
- UEFA Europa League: Round of 16
- Top goalscorer: League: Henri Saivet; Yoan Gouffran; Cheick Diabaté (8); All: Cheick Diabaté (18)
Home colours	Away colours	Third colours

The 2012–13 FC Girondins de Bordeaux season was the 39th season since the club was refounded. The season was largely successful with the taking an unbeaten run from the previous season to 17 games which was ended on 4 October 2012 with a 3-0 defeat to Newcastle United in the Europa League, as well as winning the Coupe de France.

== Competitions ==
=== Ligue 1 ===
==== League table ====
Pos	Team	Pld	W	D	L	GF	GA	GD	Pts	Qualification or relegation
5	Saint-Étienne	38	16	15	7	60	32	+28	63	Qualification for the Europa League third qualifying round (Note: Saint-Étienne, as winner of the 2012–13 Coupe de la Ligue, qualifies for the third qualifying round of 2013–14 UEFA Europa League.)
6	Lille	38	16	14	8	59	40	+19	62	
7	Bordeaux	38	13	16	9	40	34	+6	55	Qualification for the Europa League group stage (Note: Bordeaux, winner of the 2012–13 Coupe de France, qualified for the Group stage of 2013–14 UEFA Europa League.)
8	Lorient	38	14	11	13	57	58	−1	53	
9	Montpellier	38	15	7	16	54	51	+3	52	

Source: Ligue 1
Rules for classification: 1) points; 2) goal difference; 3) number of goals scored.

==== Results summary ====
Overall								Home						Away					
Pld	W	D	L	GF	GA	GD	Pts	W	D	L	GF	GA	GD	W	D	L	GF	GA	GD
38	13	16	9	40	34	+6	55	8	8	3	22	19	+3	5	8	6	18	15	+3

Last updated: 19 January 2015.
Source: Competitive matches

==== Results by round ====
Round	1	2	3	4	5	6	7	8	9	10	11	12	13	14	15	16	17	18	19	20	21	22	23	24	25	26	27	28	29	30	31	32	33	34	35	36	37	38
Ground	A	H	A	H	A	H	A	A	H	A	H	A	H	A	H	A	H	A	H	A	H	A	H	A	H	H	A	H	A	H	A	H	A	H	A	H	A	H
Result	W	W	D	D	D	D	W	D	D	L	W	W	W	L	D	D	D	D	D	W	L	W	W	L	L	L	L	W	D	D	L	W	D	D	D	W	L	W
Position	1	4	4	4	5	6	5	6	6	8	7	6	2	5	6	6	5	7	7	4	7	5	4	7	9	10	10	9	9	9	9	9	9	9	9	8	9	7

Source: Ligue1
A = Away; H = Home; W = Win; D = Draw; L = Loss

==== Matches ====
Win Draw Loss Postponed

11 August 2012 1	Evian	2–3	Bordeaux	Annecy
21:00	Wass 17'; Khelifa 90+4'	Report	Obraniak 11'; Gouffran 15'; Saivet 51'	Stadium: Parc des Sports; Attendance: 9,048; Referee: Benoit Bastien

19 August 2012 2	Bordeaux	1–0	Rennes	Bordeaux
17:00	Obraniak 75'	Report		Stadium: Stade Chaban-Delmas; Attendance: 22,163; Referee: Tony Chapron

26 August 2012 3	Paris Saint-Germain	0–0	Bordeaux	Paris
21:00		Report		Stadium: Parc des Princes; Attendance: 41,164; Referee: Antony Gautier

2 September 2012 4	Bordeaux	1–1	Nice	Bordeaux
14:00	Saivet 86'	Report	Traoré 90+3'	Stadium: Stade Chaban-Delmas; Attendance: 18,042; Referee: Philippe Kalt

5 September 2012 5	Valenciennes	0–0	Bordeaux	Valenciennes
20:00		Report		Stadium: Stade du Hainaut; Attendance: 15,073; Referee: Lionel Jaffredo

23 September 2012 6	Bordeaux	2–2	Ajaccio	Bordeaux
14:00	Carlos Henrique 54'; Gouffran 78'	Report	Faty 64'; Belghazouani 90+1'	Stadium: Stade Chaban-Delmas; Attendance: 16,295; Referee: Antony Gautier

30 September 2012 7	Lyon	0–2	Bordeaux	Lyon
21:00		Report	Trémoulinas 65'; Diabaté 82'	Stadium: Stade de Gerland; Attendance: 30,881; Referee: Laurent Duhamel

7 October 2012 8	Brest	1–1	Bordeaux	Brest
14:00	Ben Basat 37'	Report	Diabaté 68'	Stadium: Stade Francis-Le Blé; Attendance: 11,158; Referee: Clément Turpin

19 October 2012 9	Bordeaux	1–1	Lille	Bordeaux
20:45	Obraniak 18'; Marange (yellow card) 27'; Planus (yellow card) 45'	Report	Martin (yellow card) 49'; Béria (yellow card) 54'; Baša 90+3'	Stadium: Stade Chaban-Delmas; Attendance: 19,884; Referee: Ruddy Buquet

28 October 2012 10	Bastia	3–1	Bordeaux	Bastia
17:00	Thauvin 6', 17'; Khazri 56'; Marchal (yellow card) 75'; Cahuzac (yellow card) 81'	Report	Obraniak (yellow card) 16'; Gouffran 30'; Plašil (yellow card) 70'	Stadium: Stade Armand Cesari; Attendance: 13,503; Referee: Sébastien Moreira

4 November 2012 11	Bordeaux	1–0	Toulouse	Bordeaux
21:00	Maurice-Belay (yellow card) 11'; N'Guémo (yellow card) 45+2'; Gouffran 87'	Report	Akpa Akpro (yellow card) 14'; Capoue (yellow card) 70'; Ahamada (yellow card) 74'; M'Bengue (yellow card) 90+2'	Stadium: Stade Chaban-Delmas; Attendance: 17,975; Referee: Nicolas Rainville

11 November 2012 12	Lorient	0–4	Bordeaux	Lorient
17:00	Lautoa (yellow card) 51'	Report	Jussiê 19'; Obraniak 33'; Saviet 53'; Gouffran 58'	Stadium: Stade du Moustoir; Attendance: 15,686; Referee: Philippe Kalt

18 November 2012 13	Bordeaux	1–0	Marseille	Bordeaux
21:00	Gouffran 52'	Report	Cheyrou (yellow card) 30'; Apruzesse (yellow card) 85'; Mendes (red card) 90+3'	Stadium: Stade Chaban-Delmas; Attendance: 28,464; Referee: Lionel Jaffredo

25 November 2012 14	Montpellier	1–0	Bordeaux	Montpellier
14:00	Estrada (yellow card) 60'; Cabella 69'	Report	Maurice-Belay (yellow card) 66'; Poundjé (yellow card) 71'; Carlos Henrique (yellow card) 86'	Stadium: Stade de la Mosson; Attendance: 16,416; Referee: Ruddy Buquet

1 December 2012 15	Bordeaux	2–2	Sochaux	Bordeaux
20:00	Roussillon 40' (o.g.); Gouffran 47'; Planus (yellow card) 86'; Jussiê (yellow card) 90'	Report	Poujol 33'; Yaya (yellow card) 63'; Dias 87'	Stadium: Stade Chaban-Delmas; Attendance: 15,524; Referee: Benoît Bastien

9 December 2012 16	Reims	0–0	Bordeaux	Reims
14:00	Tacalfred (yellow card) 36'; Ghilas (yellow card) 60'; Ca (yellow card) 77'; Courtet (yellow card) 90+1'	Report	N'Guémo (yellow card) 43'; Carlos Henrique (yellow card) 60'; Mariano (yellow card) 84'	Stadium: Stade Auguste Delaune; Attendance: 16,021; Referee: Bartolomeu Varela

13 December 2012 17	Bordeaux	0–0	Saint-Étienne	Bordeaux
21:00	Mariano (yellow card) 43'; Biyogo Poko (yellow card) 72'	Report	Clerc (yellow card) 12'; Bayal Sall (yellow card) 54'	Stadium: Stade Chaban-Delmas; Attendance: 19,066; Referee: Clément Turpin

16 December 2012 18	Nancy	1–1	Bordeaux	Tomblaine
14:00	Lotiès (yellow card) 27'; Bakar 32'; Sami (yellow card) 38'	Report	Biyogo Poko (yellow card) 28' (yellow-red card) 45+2'; Planus (yellow card) 53'; Saivet 76'	Stadium: Stade Marcel Picot; Attendance: 16,409; Referee: Philippe Kalt

22 December 2012 19	Bordeaux	0–0	Troyes	Bordeaux
20:00	Planus (yellow card) 68'	Report	Obbadi (yellow card) 55'; Darbion (yellow card) 76'; Marcos (yellow card) 90+3'	Stadium: Stade Chaban-Delmas; Attendance: 19,726; Referee: Wilfried Bien

12 January 2013 20	Rennes	0–2	Bordeaux	Rennes
20:00		Report	Sertic (yellow card) 32'; Gouffran 57'; Planus (yellow card) 62'; Saivet 66'	Stadium: Stade de la Route de Lorient; Attendance: 22,276; Referee: Sébastien Moreira

20 January 2013 21	Bordeaux	0–1	Paris Saint-Germain	Bordeaux
21:00	Sané (yellow card) 33'; Trémoulinas (yellow card) 45'	Report	Ibrahimović 43'; Verratti (yellow card) 49'; Ménez (yellow card) 77'	Stadium: Stade Chaban-Delmas; Attendance: 32,000; Referee: Stephane Lannoy

27 January 2013 22	Nice	0–1	Bordeaux	Nice
17:00	Anin (yellow card) 69'	Report	Saivet 58'; Marange (yellow card) 62'; Carlos Henrique (yellow card) 75'; Ben Khalfallah (yellow card) 90+3'	Stadium: Stade du Ray; Attendance: 12,062; Referee: Laurent Duhamel

2 February 2013 23	Bordeaux	2–0	Valenciennes	Bordeaux
20:00	Bellion 33'; Plašil (yellow card) 52'; Obraniak 71'	Report	Mater (yellow card) 88'	Stadium: Stade Chaban-Delmas; Attendance: 15,243; Referee: Philippe Kalt

9 February 2013 24	Ajaccio	1–0	Bordeaux	Ajaccio
20:00	Faty 31', (yellow card) 70'; Saad (yellow card) 45+2'	Report		Stadium: Stade François Coty; Attendance: 6,513; Referee: Fredy Fautrel

17 February 2013 25	Bordeaux	0–4	Lyon	Bordeaux
14:00	Carrasso (yellow card) 87'	Report	Grenier 15', 73' (pen.); Umtiti (yellow card) 22'; Fofana 65'; Lacazette 75'	Stadium: Stade Chaban-Delmas; Attendance: 27,240; Referee: Nicolas Rainville

24 February 2013 26	Bordeaux	0–2	Brest	Bordeaux
17:00	Bellion (yellow card) 28'; Sané (yellow card) 82'	Report	Trémoulinas 19' (o.g.); Kantari 83' (pen.); Coulibaly (yellow card) 90+1'	Stadium: Stade Chaban-Delmas; Attendance: 14,261; Referee: Sébastien Moreira

3 March 2013 27	Lille	2–1	Bordeaux	Villeneuve-d'Ascq
21:00	Béria (yellow card) 30'; Rodelin 59'; Kalou 72'	Report	Plašil 31' (pen.); Traoré (yellow card) 32'	Stadium: Stade Pierre-Mauroy; Attendance: 40,409; Referee: Ruddy Buquet

10 March 2013 28	Bordeaux	1–0	Bastia	Bordeaux
17:00	Diabaté 57'	Report	Choplin (yellow card) 18'; Khazri (yellow card) 90+3'	Stadium: Stade Chaban-Delmas; Attendance: 15,963; Referee: Antony Gautier

17 March 2013 29	Toulouse	0–0	Bordeaux	Toulouse
17:00		Report	Saivet (yellow card) 90'	Stadium: Stadium Municipal; Attendance: 17,794; Referee: Jean-Charles Cailleux

30 March 2013 30	Bordeaux	1–1	Lorient	Bordeaux
20:00	Obraniak 85'	Report	Aliadière 42'	Stadium: Stade Chaban-Delmas; Attendance: 18,153; Referee: Stephane Lannoy

5 April 2013 31	Marseille	1–0	Bordeaux	Marseille
20:30	Gignac 41'	Report		Stadium: Stade Vélodrome; Attendance: 32,841; Referee: Tony Chapron

13 April 2013 32	Bordeaux	4–2	Montpellier	Bordeaux
20:00	Sané 11'; Diabaté 24'; Plašil 26'; Saivet 54'	Report	Cabella 45+1'; Stambouli 90+2'	Stadium: Stade Chaban-Delmas; Attendance: 20,277; Referee: Benoît Millot

21 April 2013 33	Sochaux	2–2	Bordeaux	Montbéliard
17:00	Boudebouz 34' (pen.); Mariano 51'	Report	Diabaté 78'; Bakambu 64'	Stadium: Stade Auguste Bonal; Attendance: 16,356; Referee: Alexandre Castro

27 April 2013 34	Bordeaux	0–0	Montpellier	Bordeaux
20:00		Report		Stadium: Stade Chaban-Delmas; Attendance: 18,059; Referee: Wilfried Bien

3 May 2013 35	Saint-Étienne	0–0	Bordeaux	Saint-Étienne
20:30		Report		Stadium: Stade Geoffroy-Guichard; Attendance: 24,229; Referee: Nicolas Rainville

11 May 2013 36	Bordeaux	3–2	Nancy	Bordeaux
20:00	Poko 41', (yellow card) 78'; Saivet 45'; Traoré (yellow card) 50'; Diabaté 86'; Trémoulinas (yellow card) 90+3'	Report	Mangani (yellow card) 53'; Karaboué 65'; Sané 79' (yellow card) 90+1'	Stadium: Stade Chaban-Delmas; Attendance: 15,271; Referee: Philippe Kalt

18 May 2013 37	Troyes	1–0	Bordeaux	Troyes
21:00	Camus 56'	Report		Stadium: Stade de l'Aube; Attendance: 15,487; Referee: Saïd Ennjimi

26 May 2013 38	Bordeaux	2–1	Evian	Bordeaux
21:00	Diabaté 5' (pen.), 34'	Report	Sagbo 45+3' (pen.)	Stadium: Stade Chaban-Delmas; Attendance: 15,000; Referee: Antony Gautier

=== Coupe de France ===
6 January 2013 Round of 64	Châteauroux	2–3	Bordeaux	Châteauroux
14:15	Ehua (red card) 50'; Beauvue 55'; Afougou 60'	Report	Ben Khalfallah 30'; Carlos Henrique 79'; Mariano 90+2'	Stadium: Stade Gaston Petit; Attendance: 11,500; Referee: Nicolas Rainville

23 January 2013 Round of 32	Moulins	1–2	Bordeaux	Moulins, Allier
19:30	Sébastien Ligoule 4'; Thibaut Barthomeuf (yellow card) 21'; Mickaël Alphonse (yellow card) 83'	[https://web.archive.org/web/20130206010458/http://int.soccerway.com/matches/2013/01/23/france/coupe-de-france/as-moulins/fc-girondins-de-bordeaux/1429284/	Trémoulinas 53' (yellow card) 71'; Bellion 59'; Sertic (yellow card) 64'; Carlos Henrique (yellow card) 68'; Sané (yellow card) 76'	Stadium: Stade Hector Rolland; Attendance: 3,500; Referee: Mikael Lesage

27 February 2013 Round of 16	US Raon-l'Étape	2–2 (a.e.t.) (3–5 p)	Bordeaux	Raon-l'Étape
18:45	Loïc Demangeon (yellow card) 36'; Jean Dje 64'; Amara Kieta 98'	Report	Obraniak 58', (yellow card) 104'; Traoré (yellow card) 72'; Diabaté 113'	Stadium: Stade Paul-Gasser; Attendance: 5,400; Referee: Laurent Duhamel

17 April 2013 Quarter Final	Lens	2–3	Bordeaux	Lens
19:00	Carrasso 11' (o.g.); Cyprien (yellow card) 42'; Nomenjanahary (yellow card) 70'; Bergdich 90+2'; Riou (yellow card) 90+3'	Report	Trémoulinas (yellow card) 43'; Sertic 59'; Diabaté 81', 85'; Rolán (yellow card) 90+2'	Stadium: Stade Félix-Bollaert; Attendance: 38,256; Referee: Clément Turpin

14 May 2013 Semi-final	Troyes	1–2	Bordeaux	Troyes
21:00	Bahebeck 7'	Report	Planus (yellow card) 30'; Diabaté 41'; Jarjat 63' (o.g.)	Stadium: Stade de l'Aube; Attendance: 20,000; Referee: Tony Chapron

31 May 2013 Final	Evian	2–3	Bordeaux	Paris
21:00	Sorlin (yellow card) 29'; Sagbo 51'; Dja Djédjé 70'	Report	Mariano (yellow card) 20'; Diabaté 39', 89'; Saivet 53'	Stadium: Stade de France; Attendance: 70,000; Referee: Fredy Fautrel

=== Coupe de la Ligue ===
31 October 2012 Last 16	Montpellier	1–0	Bordeaux	Montpellier
18:45	Jeunechamp (yellow card) 19' (yellow-red card) 82'; Tinhan 61'	Report	Ben Khalfallah (yellow card) 58'; Chalmé (yellow card) 68'	Stadium: Stade de la Mosson; Attendance: 7,339; Referee: Bartolomeu Varela

=== UEFA Europa League ===
==== Play-off round ====
23 August 2012 First leg	Red Star Belgrade (Serbia)	0–0	(France) Bordeaux	Belgrade, Serbia
20:00	Jovanović (yellow card) 22'; Milivojević (yellow card) 55'	Report	Sané (yellow card) 20'	Stadium: Red Star Stadium; Attendance: 39,482; Referee: Alberto Undiano Mallenco (Spain)

30 August 2012 Second leg	Bordeaux (France)	3–2 (3–2 agg.)	(Serbia) Red Star Belgrade	Bordeaux, France
19:30	Gouffran (yellow card) 31', (goal) 53', 90+3' (pen.); Maurice-Belay (yellow card) 41' (yellow-red card) 64'; Jussiê 71'; Sertic (yellow card) 81'	Report	Mladenović 45+2', (yellow card) 74'; Jovanović (yellow card) 51'; Kasalica (yellow card) 67'; Mikić 90', (yellow card) 90+1'	Stadium: Stade Chaban-Delmas; Attendance: 21,789; Referee: Mark Clattenburg (England)

==== Group stage ====
Pos	Team	Pld	W	D	L	GF	GA	GD	Pts	Qualification	BOR	NEW	MTM	BRU
1	(France) Bordeaux	6	4	1	1	10	5	+5	13	Advance to knockout phase	—	2–0	1–0	4–0
2	(England) Newcastle United	6	2	3	1	7	5	+2	9	Advance to knockout phase	3–0	—	1–1	1–0
3	(Portugal) Marítimo	6	1	3	2	4	6	−2	6		1–1	0–0	—	2–1
4	(Belgium) Club Brugge	6	1	1	4	6	11	−5	4		1–2	2–2	2–0	—

Source: Soccerway

20 September 2012 Match 1	Bordeaux (France)	4–0	(Belgium) Club Brugge	Bordeaux, France
19:00	Sané 13'; Gouffran 27'; Engels 47' (o.g.); Jussiê 66'	Report	Blondel (yellow card) 23'	Stadium: Stade Chaban-Delmas; Attendance: 13,609; Referee: Vladislav Bezborodov (Russia)

4 October 2012 Match 2	Newcastle United (England)	3–0	(France) Bordeaux	Newcastle upon Tyne, England
20:05	Ameobi 16'; Tioté (yellow card) 20'; Carlos Henrique 40' (o.g.); Anita (yellow card) 44'; Cissé 49'; Perch (yellow card) 89'	Report	Carlos Henrique (yellow card) 13'; N'Guémo (yellow card) 72'	Stadium: St James' Park; Attendance: 30,987; Referee: Antonio Mateu Lahoz (Spain)

25 October 2012 Match 3	Marítimo (Portugal)	1–1	(France) Bordeaux	Funchal, Portugal
21:05	Roberge 36'; João Luiz (yellow card) 65'; Fidélis (yellow card) 69'	Report	Gouffran 30'; Obraniak (yellow card) 38'; Maurice-Belay (yellow card) 45+1'; N'Guémo (yellow card) 74'	Stadium: Estádio dos Barreiros; Attendance: 2,218; Referee: Anastasios Kakos (Greece)

8 November 2012 Match 4	Bordeaux (France)	1–0	(Portugal) Marítimo	Bordeaux, France
19:00	Bellion 16'; Mariano (yellow card) 67'; Sacko (yellow card) 73'	Report	Rosário (yellow card) 11'; Rafael Miranda (yellow card) 13'; Briguel (yellow card) 76'; Simão (yellow card) 89'	Stadium: Stade Chaban-Delmas; Referee: Gediminas Mažeika (Lithuania)

22 November 2012 Match 5	Club Brugge (Belgium)	1–2	(France) Bordeaux	Bruges, Belgium
21:05	Lestienne (yellow card) 45+2', (goal) 86'; Jordi (yellow card) 68'; Vleminckx (yellow card) 70'	Report	Jussiê 3', 40'; Maurice-Belay (yellow card) 22'; Carlos Henrique (yellow card) 90+4'	Stadium: Jan Breydel Stadium; Referee: Florian Meyer (Germany)

6 December 2012 Match 6	Bordeaux (France)	2–0	(England) Newcastle United	Bordeaux, France
19:00	Diabaté 29', 73'	Report	Williamson (yellow card) 43'; Tavernier (yellow card) 68'	Stadium: Stade Chaban-Delmas; Referee: Menashe Masiah (Israel)

==== Round of 32 ====
14 February 2013 1st Leg	Dynamo Kyiv (Ukraine)	1–1	(France) Bordeaux	Kyiv, Ukraine
19:00	Haruna 20', (yellow card) 25'; Mykhalyk (yellow card) 55'; Bezus (yellow card) 64'	Report	Obraniak 23'; Sertic (yellow card) 85'	Stadium: NSC Olimpiyskiy; Referee: Alexandru Tudor (Romania)

21 February 2013 2nd Leg	Bordeaux (France)	1–0 (2–1 agg.)	(Ukraine) Dynamo Kyiv	Bordeaux, France
21:05	Diabaté (yellow card) 29', (goal) 41'; Sertic (yellow card) 32'; Biyogo Poko (yellow card) 77'	Report	Khacheridi (yellow card) 39'; Kranjčar (yellow card) 70'	Stadium: Stade Chaban-Delmas; Referee: Dalibor Conjar (Croatia)

==== Round of 16 ====
7 March 2013 1st Leg	Benfica (Portugal)	1–0	(France) Bordeaux	Lisbon, Portugal
21:05		Report	Carrasso 21' (o.g.); Martins (yellow card) 50'; Rodrigo (yellow card) 53'	Stadium: Estádio da Luz; Referee: Oren Borneshtain (Israel)

14 March 2013 2nd Leg	Bordeaux (France)	2–3 (2–4 agg.)	(Portugal) Benfica	Bordeaux, France
21:05	Carlos Henrique (yellow card) 10'; Obraniak (yellow card) 31'; Diabaté 74'; Ben Khalfallah (yellow card) 77'; Jardel 90+1' (o.g.)	Report	Jardel 30'; Roderick (yellow card) 52'; Cardozo 75', 90+2'; John (yellow card) 83'; Pereira (yellow card) 90'	Stadium: Stade Chaban-Delmas; Referee: Ovidiu Hațegan (Romania)
