= Jean Ambrose =

Footballer (born 1993)

Personal information
- Date of birth: 27 September 1993 (age 33)
- Place of birth: Sens, France
- Height: 1.91 m (6 ft 3 in)
- Position: Defender

Youth career
- Bordeaux

Senior career*
Years	Team	Apps	(Gls)
2013–2014	Moulins	4	(0)
2013–2014	Moulins II	13	(2)
2014–2016	Bordeaux II	25	(1)
2015–2016	Bordeaux	1	(0)
2016	Sedan	0	(0)
2016–2017	Lokomotiv GO	10	(0)
2018–2020	FC Sens	10	(0)
2020	Paro FC		

International career
2017–	Haiti	1	(0)
- * Club domestic league appearances and goals

Jean Ambrose (born 27 September 1993) is a professional footballer who plays as a defender. Born in France, he plays for the Haiti national team at international level.

== Club career ==
Ambrose joined Girondins de Bordeaux in 2014 from AS Moulins. He made his Ligue 1 debut on 13 December 2015 against Angers SCO replacing Nicolas Maurice-Belay after 79 minutes.

He joined Sedan of the Championnat National in the summer of 2016 but was shortly released following disciplinary reasons.

On 6 December 2016, Ambrose joined Bulgarian club Lokomotiv Gorna Oryahovitsa until the end of the 2016–17 season. Ambrose left without permission before the end of the season and the club applied for legal proceedings at FIFA.

== International career ==
In March 2017, Ambrose was called up to the 30-man squad by the Haiti national football team's interim coach, Jean-Claude Josaphat.

Ambrose made his debut for the senior Haiti national football team in a 3–3 2017 Kirin Challenge Cup tie with Japan on 10 October 2017.
