= Aly Yirango =

Malian footballer

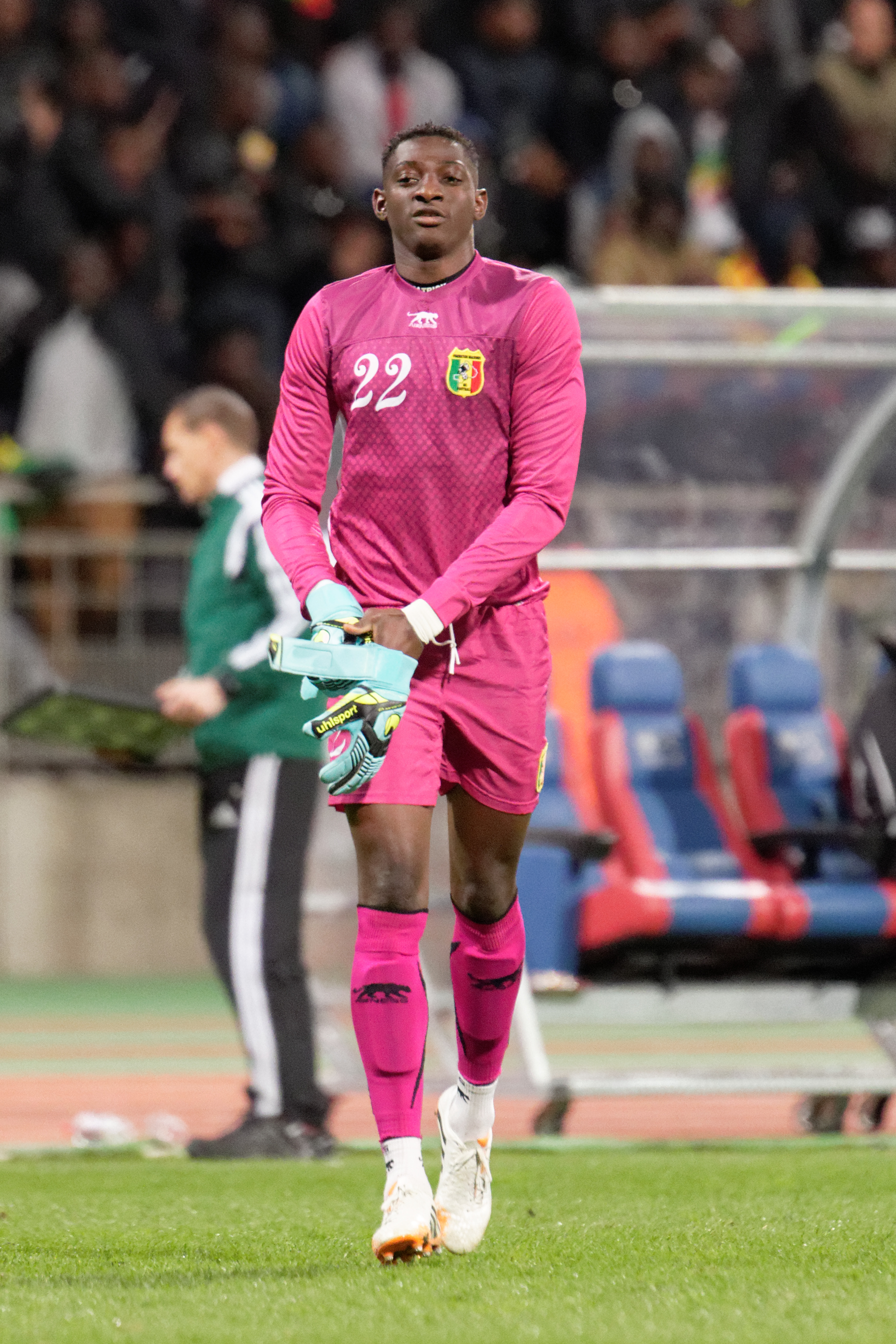
- Yirango with Mali in March 2015

Personal information
- Date of birth: 4 January 1994 (age 32)
- Place of birth: Bamako, Mali
- Height: 1.86 m (6 ft 1 in)
- Position: Goalkeeper

Senior career*
Years	Team	Apps	(Gls)
2012–2013	Djoliba AC		
2013–2014	Marseille B	4	(0)
2014–2015	Guingamp B	10	(0)
2015–2016	Challans	14	(0)
2017	Stade Briochin	0	(0)
2017–2018	Dinan-Léhon	10	(0)
2018–2019	Boulogne B	13	(0)
2018–2019	Boulogne	0	(0)
2019–2021	Lusitanos Saint-Maur	18	(0)
2021–2023	Versailles	22	(0)

International career
2015–2016	Mali	2	(0)
- * Club domestic league appearances and goals as of 19 May 2023

Aly Yirango (born 4 January 1994) is a Malian professional footballer who plays as a goalkeeper. He has won two caps with the Mali national team.

== Club career ==
Born in Bamako, Yirango has played club football for Djoliba, Marseille B, and Guingamp B.

In August 2018, Yirango joined Boulogne. He left the club at the end of the season.

== International career ==
He made his senior international debut for Mali in 2015. He was a squad member at the 2013 Africa Cup of Nations.

== Honours ==
Versailles

- Championnat National 2: 2021–22
