= Mariano (footballer, born 1986) =

Brazilian former footballer

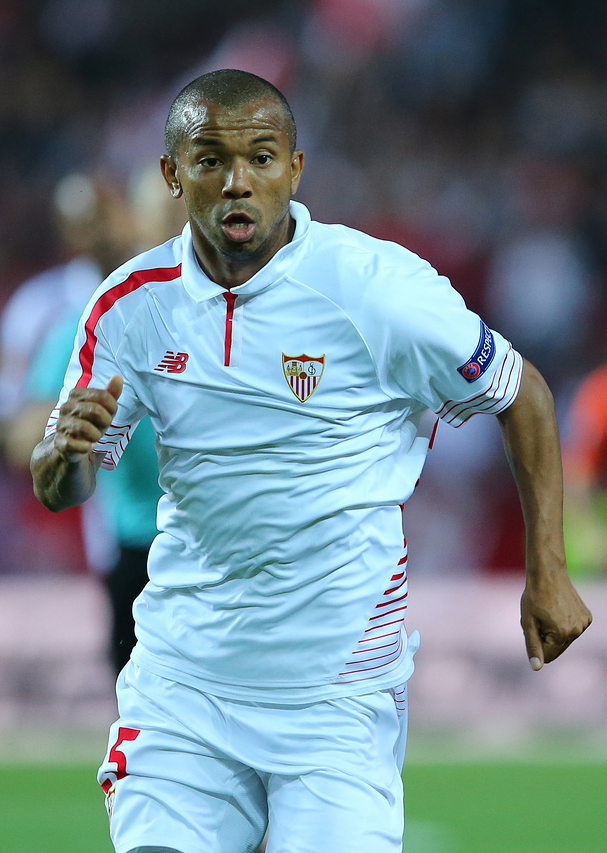
- Mariano with Sevilla in 2016

Personal information
- Full name: Mariano Ferreira Filho
- Date of birth: 23 June 1986 (age 40)
- Place of birth: São João, Brazil
- Height: 1.77 m (5 ft 10 in)
- Position: Right-back

Youth career
- 2002–2004: Guarani

Senior career*
| Years | Team | Apps | (Gls) |
| 2004–2006 | Guarani | 80 | (1) |
| 2007 | Ipatinga | 10 | (0) |
| 2007–2009 | Tombense | 0 | (0) |
| 2007 | → Cruzeiro (loan) | 18 | (0) |
| 2008 | → Ipatinga (loan) | 13 | (0) |
| 2008 | → Atlético Mineiro (loan) | 17 | (0) |
| 2009 | → Fluminense (loan) | 33 | (2) |
| 2010–2011 | Fluminense | 103 | (7) |
| 2012–2015 | Bordeaux | 120 | (2) |
| 2015–2017 | Sevilla | 54 | (0) |
| 2017–2020 | Galatasaray | 84 | (2) |
| 2020–2024 | Atlético Mineiro | 123 | (1) |
| 2025 | América Mineiro | 24 | (0) |
- * Club domestic league appearances and goals as of 21 June 2026

Mariano Ferreira Filho (born 23 June 1986), simply known as Mariano, is a Brazilian former professional footballer who played as a right-back.

He rose to prominence at Fluminense, where he made 165 appearances across three years, and was named in the Bola de Prata and Prêmio Craque do Brasileirão teams when they won the Campeonato Brasileiro Série A in 2010. He then moved to Europe and represented Bordeaux, Sevilla and Galatasaray, winning the 2015–16 UEFA Europa League with the second.

== Club career ==
=== Early career ===
Born in São João, Pernambuco, Mariano graduated with Guarani's youth setup. He made his first team – and Série A – debut on 20 November 2004, coming on as a late substitute in a 2–0 away win against Palmeiras.

In December 2006 Mariano left Bugre, and signed for Ipatinga. In May of the following year he had his rights purchased by Tombense, being immediately loaned to Cruzeiro until December 2008.

Despite appearing in 18 games, Mariano was released by Cruzeiro, and subsequently returned to Ipatinga. On 2 July 2008, he moved to cross-town rivals Atlético Mineiro, on loan until the end of the year.

=== Fluminense ===
In 2009 Mariano joined Fluminense, on loan. He scored his first professional goal on 24 May, but in a 4–1 home loss against Santos, and finished his first season at the club with 20 appearances and two goals.

An important unit for Flu during his spell, Mariano was bought outright on 5 January 2010, and continued to appear regularly over the course of two campaigns. In 2010, after scoring a career-best three goals, he was elected the tournament's best right back, as his side was also crowned champions.

=== Bordeaux ===
On 29 December 2011, Mariano signed a 4 1/2-year contract with French Ligue 1 club Girondins de Bordeaux. He made his debut for the club on 14 January 2012, playing the full 90 minutes in a 2–1 home win against Valenciennes.

Mariano scored his first goal for the club on 6 January 2013, netting a last-minute winner in a 3–2 away win against Châteauroux, for the season's Coupe de France. His first league goal came on 21 April, in a 2–2 draw at Sochaux-Montbéliard. Les Girondins won the cup final on 31 May, with Mariano playing the full 90 minutes of the 3–2 victory against Évian Thonon Gaillard and receiving the first yellow card for a foul on Daniel Wass.

=== Sevilla ===
On 17 July 2015, Sevilla FC reached an agreement with Bordeaux for the transfer of Mariano, with the player signing a three-year deal. He made his debut on 11 August in the UEFA Super Cup, coming on in the 80th minute for Kévin Gameiro in a 5–4 extra-time loss to fellow Spaniards Barcelona in Tbilisi. Mariano made ten more European appearances as the Andalusians went on to win the UEFA Europa League – scoring his sole goal to cap off a 5–2 aggregate win over Shakhtar Donetsk in the semi-finals – including the entirety of the 3–1 victory over Liverpool in the final.

=== Galatasaray ===
On 17 July 2017, Mariano signed a three-year deal at Galatasaray for a fee of up to €4.5 million with an annual wage of €2.3 million. He was encouraged to make the move by Cláudio Taffarel, former Brazil international goalkeeper who played for the Istanbul-based club. On 14 August, he and compatriot defender Maicon made their debuts in the Süper Lig in a 4–1 home win over Kayserispor. He made 26 total appearances as his club won the title in his first season, and scored twice including a 20-metre strike to open a 2–0 win over İstanbul Başakşehir at the Türk Telekom Stadium on 15 April 2018.

=== Return to Atlético Mineiro ===
On 29 July 2020, Mariano joined Atlético Mineiro on a free transfer, returning to the club twelve years after his first spell and reuniting with his former coach at Sevilla Jorge Sampaoli.

=== América Mineiro ===
In February 11 2025, Mariano joined América Mineiro.

== International career ==
In September 2010, amidst good form for Fluminense, Mariano was called up for the first time to the Brazil national team by coach Mano Menezes, for friendlies the following month. Still uncapped, he was recalled by Tite in March 2017 for a 2018 FIFA World Cup qualifier against Paraguay, when Daniel Alves was suspended for accumulation of yellow cards.

== Career statistics ==
As of 15 December 2024

Appearances and goals by club, season and competition
| Club | Season | League | | | State League | | Cup | | Continental | | Other | | Total | |
| Club | Season | Division | Apps | Goals | Apps | Goals | Apps | Goals | Apps | Goals | Apps | Goals | Apps | Goals |
|---|---|---|---|---|---|---|---|---|---|---|---|---|---|---|
| Guarani | 2004 | Série A | 3 | 0 | 0 | 0 | 0 | 0 | — | | — | | 3 | 0 |
| Guarani | 2005 | Série B | 20 | 1 | 15 | 0 | 4 | 0 | — | | — | | 39 | 1 |
| Guarani | 2006 | Série B | 26 | 0 | 16 | 0 | 4 | 1 | — | | — | | 46 | 1 |
| Guarani | Total | | 49 | 1 | 31 | 0 | 8 | 1 | — | | — | | 88 | 2 |
| Ipatinga | 2007 | Série B | 0 | 0 | 10 | 0 | 8 | 0 | — | | — | | 18 | 0 |
| Cruzeiro | 2007 | Série A | 18 | 0 | — | | — | | 1 (Note: Appearance(s) in Copa Sudamericana) | 0 | — | | 19 | 0 |
| Ipatinga | 2008 | Série A | 6 | 0 | 7 | 0 | — | | — | | — | | 13 | 0 |
| Atlético Mineiro | 2008 | Série A | 17 | 0 | — | | — | | 2 | 0 | — | | 19 | 0 |
| Fluminense | 2009 | Série A | 20 | 2 | 13 | 0 | 7 | 0 | 8 | 0 | — | | 48 | 2 |
| Fluminense | 2010 | Série A | 34 | 3 | 16 | 2 | 6 | 0 | — | | — | | 56 | 5 |
| Fluminense | 2011 | Série A | 36 | 1 | 17 | 1 | — | | 8 (Note: Appearance(s) in Copa Libertadores) | 0 | — | | 61 | 2 |
| Fluminense | Total | | 90 | 6 | 46 | 3 | 13 | 0 | 16 | 0 | — | | 165 | 9 |
| Bordeaux | 2011–12 | Ligue 1 | 19 | 0 | — | | 2 | 0 | 0 | 0 | — | | 21 | 0 |
| Bordeaux | 2012–13 | Ligue 1 | 32 | 1 | — | | 5 | 1 | 9 (Note: Appearance(s) in UEFA Europa League) | 0 | — | | 46 | 2 |
| Bordeaux | 2013–14 | Ligue 1 | 38 | 0 | — | | 1 | 0 | 0 | 0 | 2 (Note: One appearance in Coupe de la Ligue, one appearance in Trophée des Champions) | 0 | 41 | 0 |
| Bordeaux | 2014–15 | Ligue 1 | 31 | 1 | — | | 2 | 1 | — | | 2 (Note: Appearance(s) in Coupe de la Ligue) | 0 | 35 | 2 |
| Bordeaux | Total | | 120 | 2 | — | | 10 | 2 | 9 | 0 | 4 | 0 | 143 | 4 |
| Sevilla | 2015–16 | La Liga | 23 | 0 | — | | 3 | 0 | 10 (Note: Four appearances in UEFA Champions League, six appearances and one goal in UEFA Europa League) | 1 | 1 (Note: Appearance(s) in UEFA Super Cup) | 0 | 37 | 1 |
| Sevilla | 2016–17 | La Liga | 31 | 0 | — | | 1 | 0 | 8 (Note: Appearance(s) in UEFA Champions League) | 0 | 3 (Note: Two appearances in Supercopa de España, one appearance in UEFA Super Cup) | 0 | 43 | 0 |
| Sevilla | Total | | 54 | 0 | — | | 4 | 0 | 18 | 1 | 4 | 0 | 80 | 1 |
| Galatasaray | 2017–18 | Süper Lig | 26 | 2 | — | | 2 | 0 | 0 | 0 | — | | 28 | 2 |
| Galatasaray | 2018–19 | Süper Lig | 30 | 0 | — | | 4 | 0 | 5 (Note: Three appearances in UEFA Champions League, two appearances in UEFA Europa League) | 0 | 0 | 0 | 39 | 0 |
| Galatasaray | 2019–20 | Süper Lig | 28 | 0 | — | | 3 | 0 | 6 | 0 | 1 (Note: Appearance(s) in Turkish Super Cup) | 0 | 38 | 0 |
| Galatasaray | Total | | 84 | 2 | — | | 9 | 0 | 11 | 0 | 1 | 0 | 105 | 2 |
| Atlético Mineiro | 2020 | Série A | 8 | 0 | 3 | 0 | — | | — | | — | | 11 | 0 |
| Atlético Mineiro | 2021 | Série A | 25 | 0 | 10 | 1 | 7 | 0 | 8 | 0 | — | | 50 | 1 |
| Atlético Mineiro | 2022 | Série A | 25 | 0 | 6 | 0 | 3 | 0 | 9 | 0 | 1 (Note: Appearance in Supercopa do Brasil) | 0 | 44 | 0 |
| Atlético Mineiro | 2023 | Série A | 22 | 0 | 7 | 0 | 3 | 0 | 6 | 0 | — | | 38 | 0 |
| Atlético Mineiro | 2024 | Série A | 11 | 0 | 6 | 0 | 2 | 0 | 3 | 0 | — | | 22 | 0 |
| Atlético Mineiro | Total | | 91 | 0 | 32 | 1 | 15 | 0 | 26 | 0 | 1 | 0 | 165 | 1 |
| Career total | | | 529 | 11 | 126 | 4 | 67 | 3 | 83 | 1 | 10 | 0 | 815 | 19 |

== Honours ==
Fluminense

- Série A: 2010

Bordeaux

- Coupe de France: 2012–13

Sevilla

- UEFA Europa League: 2015–16

Galatasaray

- Süper Lig: 2017–18, 2018–19
- Turkish Cup: 2018–19
- Turkish Super Cup: 2019

Atlético Mineiro

- Série A: 2021
- Copa do Brasil: 2021
- Campeonato Mineiro: 2020, 2021, 2022, 2023, 2024
- Supercopa do Brasil: 2022

Individual

- Bola de Prata: 2010, 2021
- Campeonato Brasileiro Série A Team of the Year: 2010
- UEFA Europa League Squad of the Season: 2015–16
- Süper Lig Team of the Season: 2017–18
