= Antony Ranieri =

Association football player (born 1997)

Personal information
- Date of birth: 21 June 1997 (age 29)
- Place of birth: Bari, Italy
- Height: 1.65 m (5 ft 5 in)
- Position: Forward

Team information
- Current team: Villefranche SJB

Youth career
- 2007–2016: Nice

Senior career*
Years	Team	Apps	(Gls)
2014–2018	Nice B	71	(9)
2016	Nice	2	(0)
2018–2019	Colomiers	25	(1)
2019–2020	Grasse	11	(1)
2020–2021	Toulon	9	(1)
2021	Monaco B	1	(0)
2024–	Villefranche SJB	1	(0)

International career
2013	France U16	2	(0)
- * Club domestic league appearances and goals as of 7 September 2024

Antony Ranieri (born 21 June 1997) is a professional footballer who plays a striker for Championnat National 3 club Villefranche SJB. Born in Italy, he is a former France youth international.

== Club career ==
Ranieri is a youth exponent from Nice. He made his Ligue 1 debut on 10 January 2016 against Lille, replacing Hatem Ben Arfa after 88 minutes in a 1–1 away draw.

== International career ==
On 5 March 2013, Ranieri made his first appearance for the France under-16 team, starting in a 4–2 friendly loss against Romania in Mogoșoaia.
