= Fouad M'Roudjaé =

Comorian footballer (born 1994)

Personal information
- Date of birth: 24 June 1994 (age 32)
- Place of birth: Marseille, France
- Height: 1.81 m (5 ft 11 in)
- Position: Left back

Senior career*
Years	Team	Apps	(Gls)
2013–2015	Marseille B	26	(0)
2017–2019	USM Endoume Catalans	6	(2)

International career^{‡}
2014	Comoros	2	(0)
- * Club domestic league appearances and goals as of 15:13, 27 September 2026 (UTC) ‡ National team caps and goals as of 15:13, 27 September 2026 (UTC)

Fouad M'Roudjaé (born 24 June 1994) is a footballer who plays as a left back. Born in France, he represented the Comoros at international level.

== Career ==
Born in Marseille, M'Roudjaé has played club football for Marseille B and USM Endoume Catalans.

He made his international debut for Comoros in 2014.
