= Kévin Anin =

French footballer (born 1986)

Personal information
- Date of birth: 5 July 1986 (age 40)
- Place of birth: Le Havre, France
- Height: 1.89 m (6 ft 2 in)
- Position: Midfielder

Youth career
- 1999–2006: Le Havre

Senior career*
| Years | Team | Apps | (Gls) |
| 2006–2010 | Le Havre | 63 | (2) |
| 2010–2012 | Sochaux | 38 | (0) |
| 2012–2013 | Nice | 26 | (1) |
| Total | | 127 | (3) |
- * Club domestic league appearances and goals

Kévin Anin (born 5 July 1986) is a French former professional footballer who played as a midfielder.

== Career ==
A product of the Le Havre youth system which has helped develop the likes of Lassana Diarra and Charles N'Zogbia in recent years, Anin began his career in 1999 at Le Havre AC. Following his club's relegation to Ligue 2, a number of French sides, including Bordeaux, Auxerre, Sochaux and Rennes, made offers for the midfield player who had a trial at Tottenham Hotspur.

After spending a 1.5-year spell at Sochaux Anin moved to OGC Nice on a four-year contract for a reported €2.5m on 18 January 2012.

== Road accident ==
On 4 June 2013, Anin was involved in a road accident on the A28 motorway situated around 60 kilometres north-east of Rouen. He was reportedly asleep in the back of the car when the driver lost control of the vehicle. Anin suffered arm and spinal injuries and was initially placed in an induced coma. He spent a month receiving treatment in hospital before being released to begin rehabilitation. As a result of the car crash, he remained paralysed from the waist down forcing him to quit his football career. His number 17 shirt with OGC Nice was retired to pay tribute to him.
