= Robin Taillan =

French footballer (born 1992)

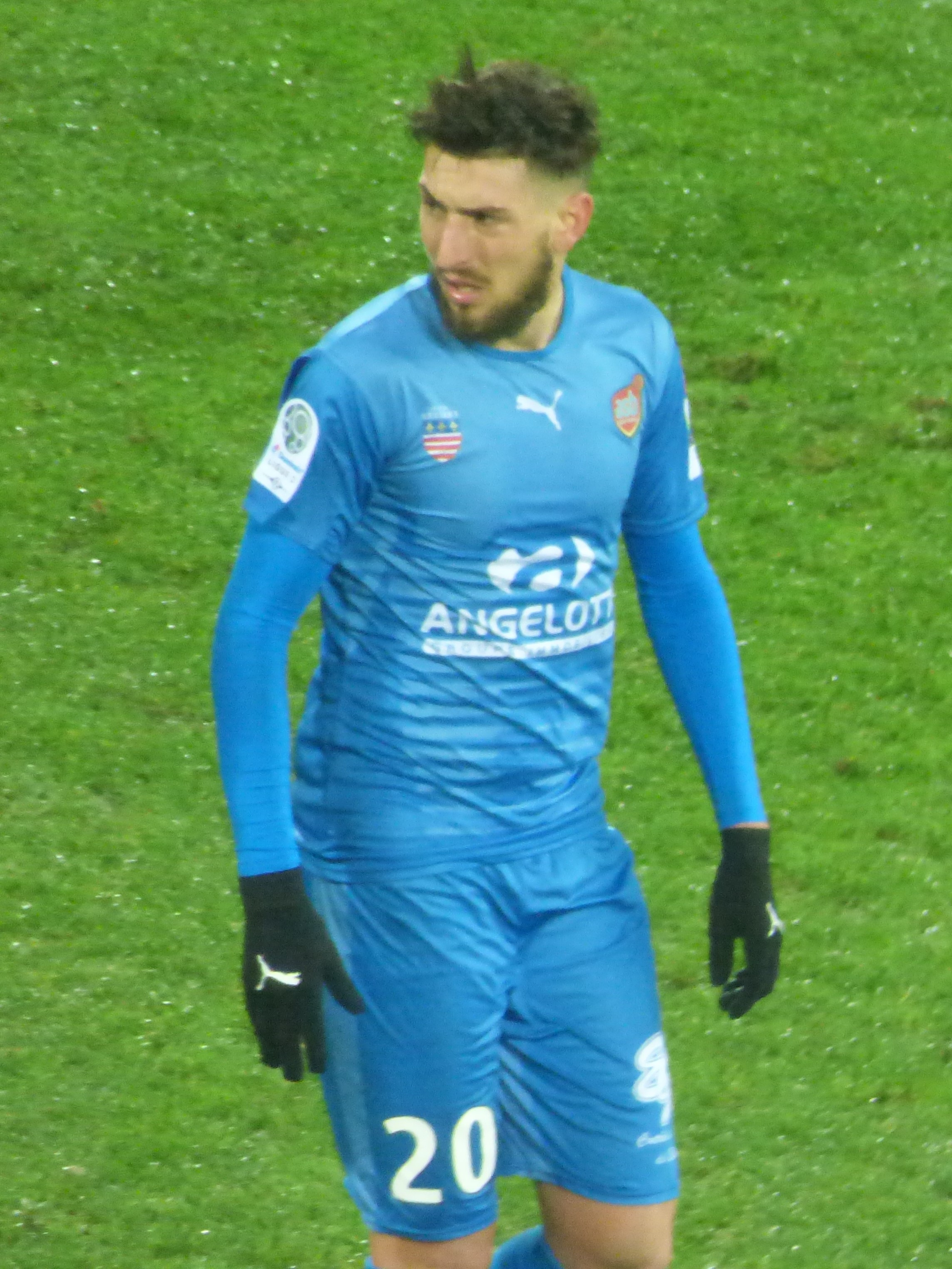
- Taillan in 2019

Personal information
- Date of birth: 27 May 1992 (age 34)
- Place of birth: Béziers, France
- Height: 1.84 m (6 ft 0 in)
- Position: Right-back

Team information
- Current team: Agde

Senior career*
Years	Team	Apps	(Gls)
2011–2012	Agde	27	(5)
2012–2014	Béziers	26	(2)
2014–2015	Marseille II	17	(0)
2015–2016	Paulhan-Pézenas	23	(1)
2016–2020	Béziers	96	(2)
2019	Béziers II	1	(0)
2020–2022	Quevilly-Rouen	35	(0)
2021	Quevilly-Rouen II	4	(0)
2022	Sedan	23	(0)
2023–2024	Sète	14	(1)
2024–	Agde	9	(0)
- * Club domestic league appearances and goals as of 14 December 2024

Robin Taillan (born 27 May 1992) is a French professional footballer who plays as a right-back for Championnat National 3 club Agde.

== Career ==
Taillan briefly joined Olympique de Marseille in 2014, and played for their reserve side. He rejoined Béziers and helped them get promoted to the Ligue 2 in 2018. He made his professional debut with Béziers in a 2–0 Ligue 2 win over Nancy on 27 July 2018.

In June 2020, Taillan joined Quevilly-Rouen after Béziers were relegated to the Championnat National 2.

== Personal life ==
Outside of football, Taillan is also trained as an electrician.

== Career statistics ==
As of match played 14 January 2022

Club statistics
Club	Season	League			National Cup		League Cup		Other		Total	
Club	Season	Division	Apps	Goals	Apps	Goals	Apps	Goals	Apps	Goals	Apps	Goals
Agde	2010–11	CFA	4	1	0	0	—		—		4	1
Agde	2011–12	CFA	23	4	0	0	—		—		23	4
Agde	Total		27	5	0	0	—		—		27	5
Béziers	2012–13	CFA	14	1	0	0	—		—		14	1
Béziers	2013–14	CFA	12	1	1	0	—		—		13	1
Béziers	Total		26	2	1	0	—		—		27	2
Marseille II	2013–14	CFA 2	6	0	—		—		—		6	0
Marseille II	2014–15	CFA 2	11	0	—		—		—		11	0
Marseille II	Total		17	0	—		—		—		17	0
Paulhan-Pézenas	2015–16	CFA 2	23	1	0	0	—		—		23	1
Béziers	2016–17	National	16	1	0	0	—		—		16	1
Béziers	2017–18	National	30	0	0	0	—		—		30	0
Béziers	2018–19	Ligue 2	28	1	0	0	0	0	—		28	1
Béziers	2019–20	National	22	0	0	0	0	0	0	0	22	0
Béziers	Total		96	2	0	0	0	0	0	0	96	2
Béziers II	2019–20	National 3	1	0	—		—		—		1	0
Quevilly-Rouen	2020–21	National	33	0	2	0	—		—		35	0
Quevilly-Rouen	2021–22	Ligue 2	2	0	0	0	—		—		2	0
Quevilly-Rouen	Total		35	0	2	0	—		—		37	0
Quevilly-Rouen II	2021–22	National 3	4	0	—		—		—		4	0
Sedan	2021–22	National	1	0	0	0	—		—		1	0
Career totals			230	10	3	0	0	0	0	0	233	10
