= Cédric Carrasso =

French footballer (born 1981)

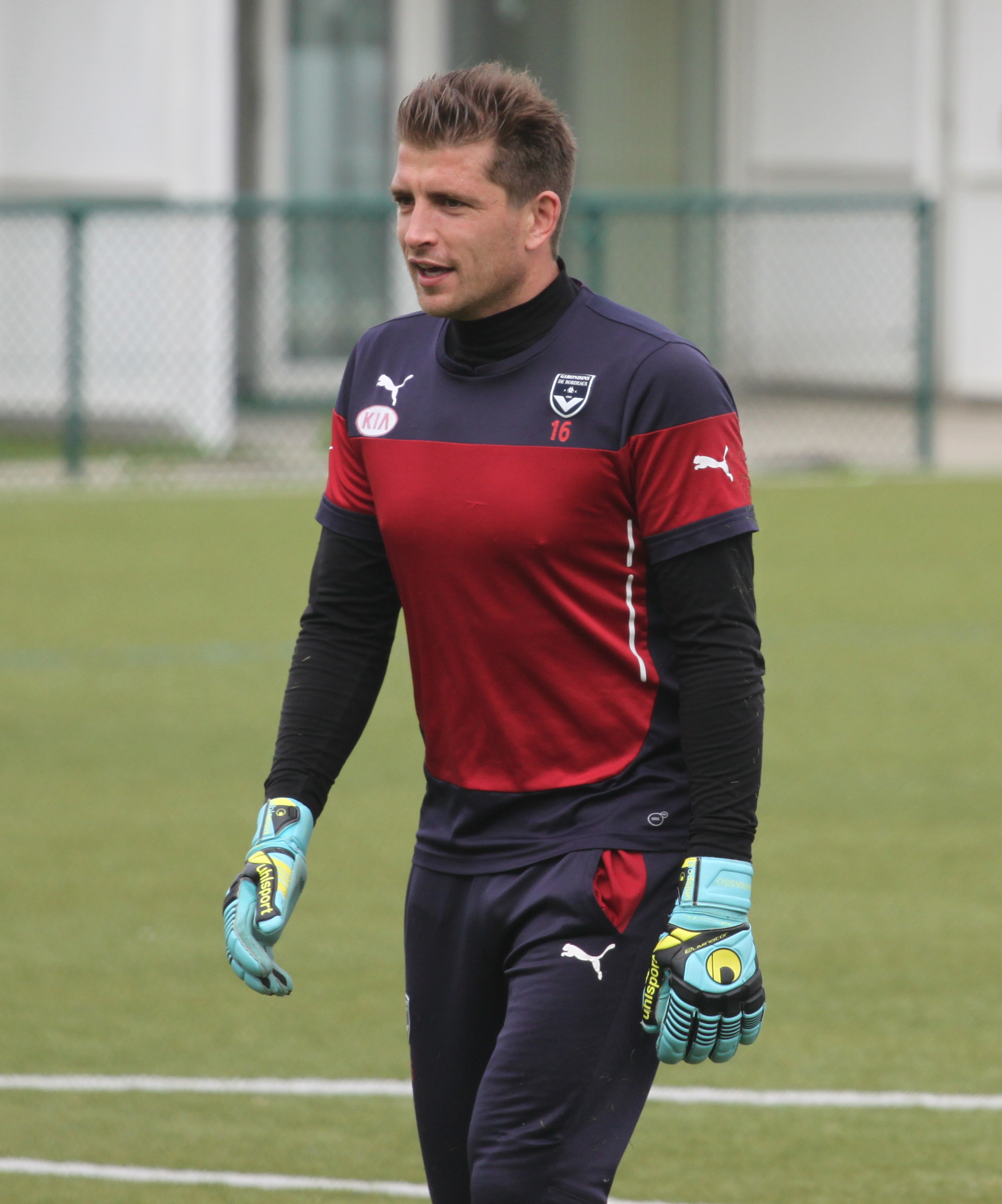
- Carrasso training with Bordeaux in 2016

Personal information
- Full name: Cédric Pascal Régis Carrasso
- Date of birth: 30 December 1981 (age 44)
- Place of birth: Avignon, France
- Height: 1.87 m (6 ft 2 in)
- Position: Goalkeeper

Youth career
- –1993: Avignon
- 1993–2001: Marseille

Senior career*
Years	Team	Apps	(Gls)
2001–2008	Marseille	59	(0)
2001–2002	→ Crystal Palace (loan)	1	(0)
2004–2005	→ Guingamp (loan)	25	(0)
2008–2009	Toulouse	37	(0)
2009–2017	Bordeaux	256	(0)
2017–2018	Galatasaray	1	(0)
Total		379	(0)

International career
2011	France	1	(0)
- * Club domestic league appearances and goals

Cédric Pascal Régis Carrasso (born 30 December 1981) is a French former professional footballer who spent most of his career with Bordeaux and Marseille playing as a goalkeeper. He was also capped once for the France national team.

== Club career ==
=== Marseille ===
Carrasso joined Marseille's youth system at the age of thirteen and, despite leaving for Avignon for one year in 1998, it was there that he signed his first professional contract. Before he had a chance to play for the first team, he was loaned out to Crystal Palace for the 2001–02 season, where he only got to play one match. Upon his return to Marseille, Carrasso made his debut for Marseille in a 2–0 win over Montpellier on 2 November 2002, where he got his first clean sheet in his professional debut and later on he replaced Vedran Runje for a couple of games, but seriously injured himself in an exhibition match against France 98 and was sidelined for the whole of the 2003–04 season. He was then loaned out again, this time to Guingamp, for the following season, and there he became the number one keeper for the first time in his career.

When he returned to Marseille, Carrasso was asked to fill in during Fabien Barthez's long ban. His performances were deemed impressive enough for him to retain the starting keeper position for the 2006–07 season and force Barthez to leave the club. On 9 October 2005, Carrasso signed a new contract, which would keep him until 2009. In the second leg of UEFA Cup on 16 March 2006 against Zenit Saint Petersburg leading 1–0 in the first leg, Carrasso received a red card in his Marseille career on a 90th minutes as the result was 1–1 which, meant that Zenit won 2–1 on aggregate. Carrasso remained as a first-choice goalkeeper for Marseille until on 22 August 2007, however, Carrasso injured his left Achilles tendon, which ruled him out for six months. During that time, Steve Mandanda stepped in and, when Carrasso finally returned, Eric Gerets informed him that he would be but the number two goalkeeper from then on.

=== Toulouse ===
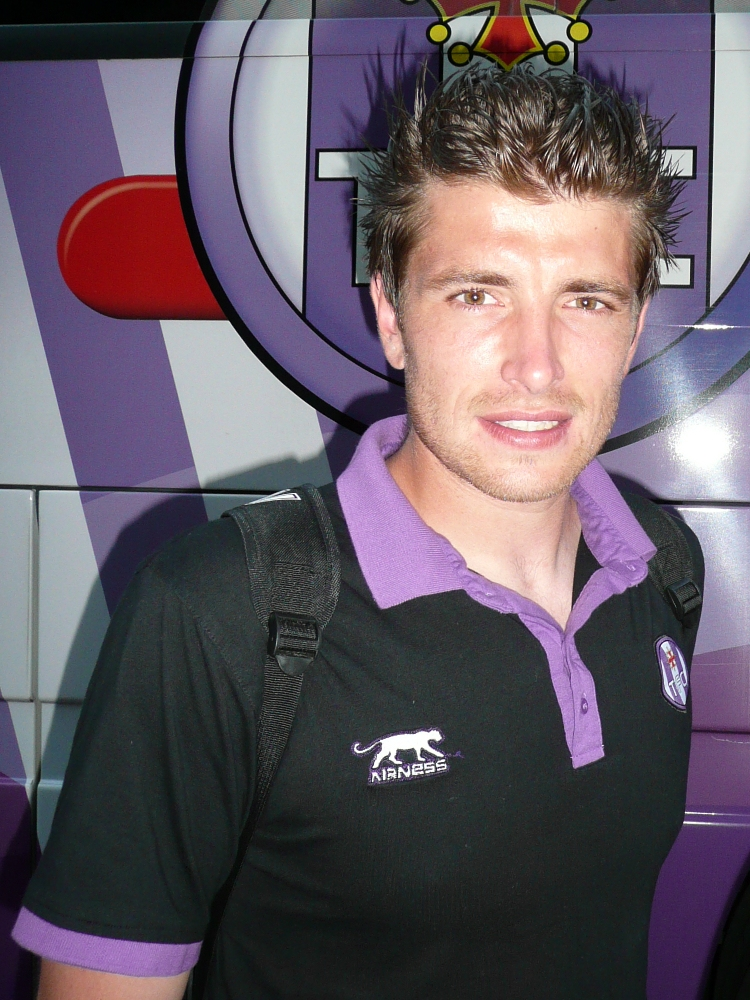
Carrasso with Toulouse in 2008

Unwilling to spend another season on the bench, Carrasso joined FC Toulouse for the 2008–09 season. In Toulouse, he had the difficult task of replacing Nicolas Douchez, who had left for Rennes that same summer. On 10 August 2008, Carrasso made his debut for Toulouse in a 3–0 loss against Olympique Lyonnais. Despite the loss, Carrasso remained the first-choice goalkeeper ahead of Sébastien Hamel and Olivier Blondel. Toulouse conceded only 27 goals during the 2008 campaign, the fewest in the Championnat. Carrasso also has a total of clean sheet of 19 in the league.

=== Bordeaux ===
His performances attracted the attention of defending champions Bordeaux, who needed a replacement for the iconic but aging Ulrich Ramé, and on 30 June, he was acquired for a transfer fee of €8 million. Following his move to Bordeaux, Carrasso told L’Equipe that he was now looking forward to Champions League football with his new club. Carrasso also told L'Equpe:

"Working with Ulrich, a person of great experience, will be a great pleasure. Moreover, he will be a guide for me on a day-to-day basis and getting to know the club. There has been much discussion on the causes of my transfer, but what I want to say is that I have never had any problems or disputes with Toulouse and is just a career choice that was made. I know that for goalkeeping positions, few places are made available. Given the motivation and the desire expressed by the leaders of the club who are champions of France, I could not miss the opportunity. For me, Bordeaux is a very big European club who have ambitions in the Champions League."

Carrasso made his debut for Bordeaux in 4–1 win over Lens. By 9 August 2009, he had amassed a total of 29 clean sheets in League 1. Despite his success, Carrasso conceded 5 times to Lorient in a 5–1 loss on 19 February 2012 and received a straight red card in stoppage time, earning him a one-match ban. (This was Carrasso's second sending-off against Lorient, the first coming during his spell with Guingamp, when he was dismissed in minute 76 of the 1–1 draw between Lorient and Guingamp played 20 September 2004.) During his one-match ban, Ulrich Ramé, the man he replaced as first-choice keeper at Bordeaux, deputized for him. Carrasso returned to action against Brest in a 3–1 win on 6 March 2011. His consistent performances with Bordeaux resulted in a new contract running until 2015. On 17 September 2011, during his third season at Bordeaux, with the Girondins winning 2–0 at half time against Toulouse, Carrasso received another red card, this time for a foul on Franck Tabanou. He was replaced by youngster Abdoulaye Keita, who conceded a late goal from Emmanuel Rivière in an eventual 3–2 loss. Once again, Carrasso received a one-match ban. On this occasion, newly arrived goalkeeper Kévin Olimpa took his place, mading his debut against Lille in a 1–1 draw. After serving his ban, Carrasso returned to action against Lyon in a 3–1 loss on 24 September 2010.

=== Galatasaray ===
Carrasso signed for Galatasaray after his contract with Bordeaux expired on 8 September 2017. After the end of 2017–18 season, the club did not offer him a new contract and Carrasco became a free agent.

== International career ==
Thanks to excellent performances with Toulouse, Carrasso received his first call-up for the France national team for a friendly against Argentina on 11 February 2009. He was then called up for every subsequent France game by Raymond Domenech, but always in the role of third keeper behind Hugo Lloris and Steve Mandanda. He was included in the squad for the 2010 FIFA World Cup, but injured himself in training. Stéphane Ruffier was called up the fill-in as third choice keeper. However, FIFA denied France's request for this substitution, and Carrasso remained the official third keeper, despite the fact that Ruffier was training with the France squad.

When Laurent Blanc took over as the France manager, he also named Carrasso as his third keeper for every game (apart from a friendly against Norway, for which none of the 23 members of the previous World Cup were called up). Carrasso made his debut in the friendly game against Poland played on 8 June 2011. It was his only appearance for France at any level.

== Career statistics ==
=== Club ===
As of match played 12 February 2018

Appearances and goals by club, season and competition
Club	Season	League			Cup		League Cup		Europe		Other		Total	
Club	Season	Division	Apps	Goals	Apps	Goals	Apps	Goals	Apps	Goals	Apps	Goals	Apps	Goals
Marseille	1999–2000	Ligue 1	0	0	0	0	0	0	0	0	—		0	0
Marseille	2000–01	Ligue 1	0	0	0	0	0	0	—		—		0	0
Marseille	2002–03	Ligue 1	2	0	0	0	0	0	—		—		2	0
Marseille	2003–04	Ligue 1	0	0	0	0	0	0	0	0	—		0	0
Marseille	2005–06	Ligue 1	15	0	3	0	0	0	9	0	—		27	0
Marseille	2006–07	Ligue 1	38	0	6	0	2	0	5	0	—		51	0
Marseille	2007–08	Ligue 1	4	0	1	0	0	0	0	0	—		5	0
Marseille	Total		59	0	10	0	2	0	14	0	—		85	0
Crystal Palace (loan)	2001–02	First Division	1	0	0	0	0	0	—		—		1	0
Guingamp (loan)	2004–05	Ligue 2	26	0	3	0	1	0	—		—		30	0
Toulouse	2008–09	Ligue 1	37	0	5	0	1	0	—		—		43	0
Bordeaux	2009–10	Ligue 1	29	0	0	0	1	0	9	0	1	0	40	0
Bordeaux	2010–11	Ligue 1	35	0	2	0	2	0	—		—		39	0
Bordeaux	2011–12	Ligue 1	37	0	3	0	0	0	—		—		40	0
Bordeaux	2012–13	Ligue 1	38	0	5	0	1	0	10	0	—		54	0
Bordeaux	2013–14	Ligue 1	36	0	2	0	2	0	4	0	1	0	45	0
Bordeaux	2014–15	Ligue 1	37	0	2	0	1	0	—		—		40	0
Bordeaux	2015–16	Ligue 1	20	0	0	0	2	0	7	0	—		29	0
Bordeaux	2016–17	Ligue 1	24	0	3	0	0	0	—		—		27	0
Bordeaux	Total		256	0	17	0	9	0	30	0	2	0	314	0
Galatasaray	2017–18	Süper Lig	1	0	1	0	—		—		—		2	0
Career total			380	0	36	0	13	0	44	0	2	0	475	0

== Honours ==
Marseille

- UEFA Intertoto Cup: 2005

Bordeaux

- Trophée des Champions: 2009
- Coupe de France: 2012–13

Galatasaray

- Süper Lig: 2017–18
