= France 98 (charity association) =

French charity association

- Head coach: (France) Aimé Jacquet
- Top scorer: Robert Pires (6)
First colours	Second colours

First international
- France 98 1 - 4 Olympique de Marseille (November 4, 2002)

Biggest win
- France 98 8 - 2 Team Karembeu (May 31, 2008)

Biggest defeat
- France 98 1 - 4 Olympique de Marseille (November 4, 2002); France 98 1 - 4 FC Girondins de Bordeaux (November 16, 2003)

France 98 is an association founded by the French footballers who won the 1998 FIFA World Cup. They organise charity and testimonial matches for former players.

Didier Deschamps is the president of the association. Aimé Jacquet acts as the head coach whenever there is a game. The players are for the most part those who took part in the 1998 World Cup and Euro 2000 victorious campaigns. Charity games, organised by the association, included fundraises to benefit victims of floods in south-eastern France in 2002, of the 2003 earthquake in Algeria, of the AZF explosion in France in 2005, and of the earthquake in Haiti in 2010.

== Matches played ==
=== First match ===
Organiser: Laurent Blanc

On November 4, 2002, in Nîmes against Marseille, to raise money for the victims of the floods in south-eastern France in September 2002. The match ended up in a 1–4 loss for France 98.

=== Second match ===
Organiser: Zinedine Zidane

On October 6, 2003, in Marseille against Marseille, to raise money for the victims of the 2003 Boumerdès earthquake in Algeria and those of fires in south-eastern France. The match ended up in a 1–1 draw.

=== Third match ===
Organiser: Bixente Lizarazu

=== Fourth match ===
Organiser: Fabien Barthez

On May 30, 2005, in Toulouse against Toulouse, to raise money for the victims of the explosion of chemical factory AZF. The match ended up in a 1–2 loss for France 98, with Daniel Moreira playing for both teams during the match.

=== Fifth match ===
Organiser: Pascal Vahirua

On May 26, 2008, in Tahiti for Pascal Vahirua's testimonial match against a selection of « friends of Pascal Vahirua's », mostly Tahitian players. The match ended up in a 3–3 draw.

=== Sixth match ===
Organiser: Christian Karembeu

On May 31, 2008, in Nouméa for Christian Karembeu's testimonial match against Team Karembeu, composed for the most part of Karembeu's Melanesian friends. The match ended up in an 8–2 victory for France 98.

=== Seventh match ===
On July 12, 2008, in the Stade de France (Saint-Denis) for the tenth anniversary of the win in the World Cup final. France 98 played a World selection in front of over 80,000 spectators. The match ended up in a 3–3 draw.

=== Eighth match ===
On July 29, 2015, at the Stade Mayol in Toulon to benefit a local children's charity, France 98 played European Rugby Champions Cup winners RC Toulonnais in a match with one football half and one rugby union half. Toulon had previously played one such charity match in 2013 against Olympique de Marseille at the same venue. France 98 won the football half 6-3, but Toulon won the rugby union half 30-20 to win 33-26 overall. Former France rugby union coach Bernard Laporte served as one of the referees.

=== Ninth match ===
On June 12, 2018, at the Paris La Défense Arena (U Arena) in Nanterre for the twentieth anniversary of the World Cup victory. France 98 played a FIFA 98 team coached by Arsène Wenger and won 3–2 after Vincent Candela's winner following goals from (in order) Fernando Morientes, Henry, Zidane and Gaizka Mendieta. The match was also broadcast in full on TF1.

== Trophée d'honneur ==
On May 11, 2008, France 98 were awarded the Trophée d'honneur during the Trophées UNFP du football ceremony to commemorate the tenth anniversary of the World Cup victory.
