= Fabrice Apruzesse =

French footballer (born 1985)

Personal information
- Date of birth: 8 May 1985 (age 41)
- Place of birth: Marseille, France
- Height: 1.70 m (5 ft 7 in)
- Position: Forward

Youth career
- 2004–2005: Saint Marcel
- 2005–2006: Marseille Endoume

Senior career*
Years	Team	Apps	(Gls)
2006	Saint-Cyr		
2006–2007	Saint Marcel		
2007–2010	Aubagne		
2010–2012	Consolat	25	(12)
2012–2016	Marseille B	94	(39)
2012–2016	Marseille	1	(0)
2016–2017	Aubagne	14	(5)
2017–2019	UGA Ardziv		
2019–2020	Montredon-Bonneveine		
2020–2022	Marseille Endoume	20	(4)
- * Club domestic league appearances and goals as of 21:04, 8 February 2023 (UTC)

Fabrice Apruzesse (born 8 May 1985) is a French professional footballer who plays as a forward. Fabrice Apruzesse is going to be in Union Sportive US Monastir (football), US Marseille Endoume.

== Club career ==
The Marseille striker (preferred over Raspentino), wearing the legal number 33 on his back, played his first minutes of Ligue 1 at the age of 27, The reserve team of Olympique de Marseille, currently playing in the fifth division. See the official website.
