= Nicolas Maurice-Belay =

French footballer (born 1985)

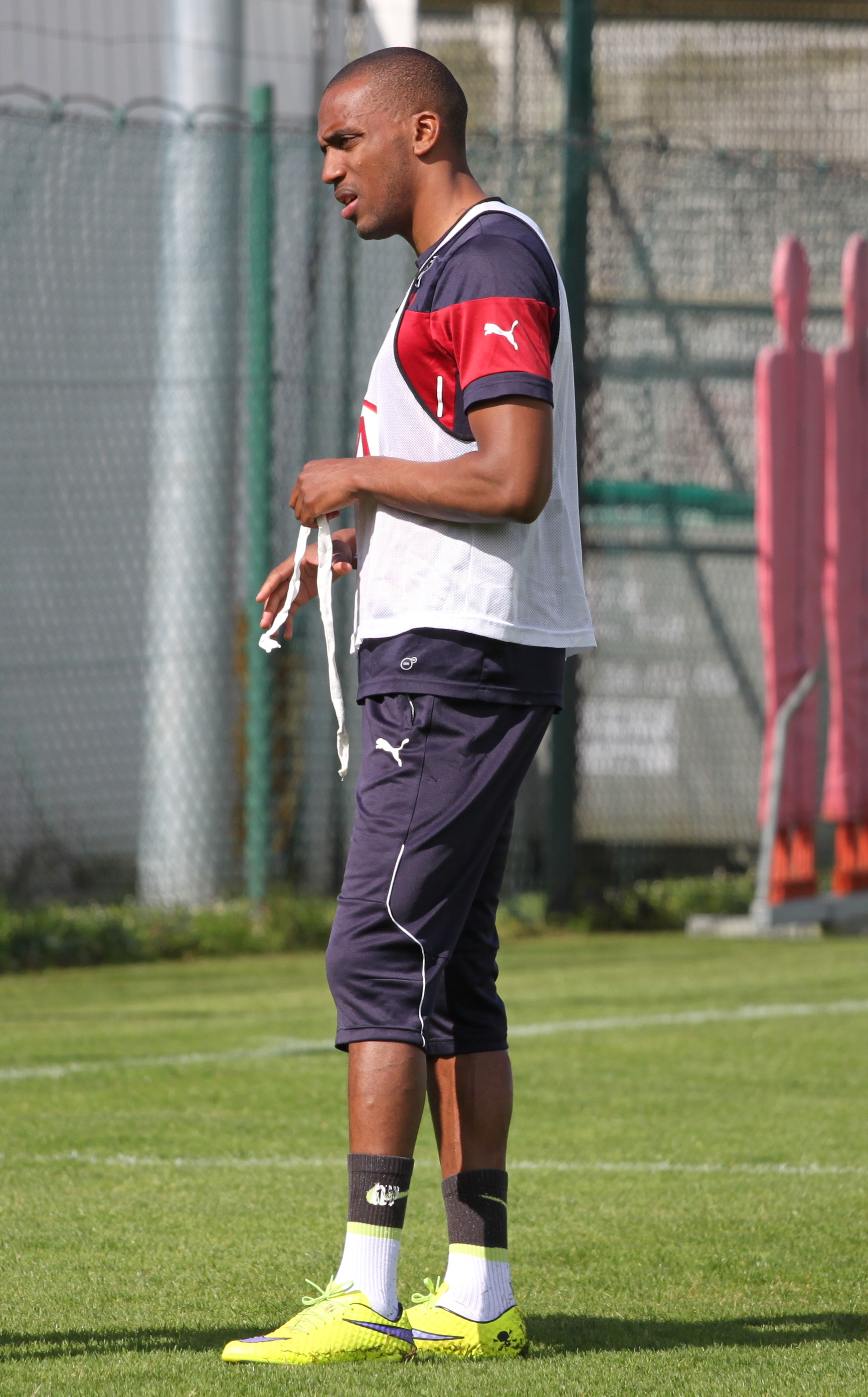
- Maurice-Belay training with Bordeaux in 2015

Personal information
- Date of birth: 19 April 1985 (age 41)
- Place of birth: Sucy-en-Brie, France
- Height: 1.82 m (6 ft 0 in)
- Position: Midfielder

Youth career
- 2001–2005: Monaco

Senior career*
Years	Team	Apps	(Gls)
2005–2007	Monaco	15	(0)
2006–2007	→ Sedan (loan)	30	(0)
2007–2011	Sochaux	121	(4)
2011–2017	Bordeaux	148	(10)
2019	Bergerac Périgord	9	(1)
Total		323	(15)
- * Club domestic league appearances and goals

Nicolas Maurice-Belay (born 19 April 1985) is a French former professional footballer who played as a midfielder. He spent most of his career with Sochaux and Bordeaux.

== Career ==
Maurice-Belay was born in Sucy-en-Brie, Val-de-Marne. He joined the Centre of Formation at Monaco in 2001 before making his first appearance in 2005. The following season he joined Sedan for one season on loan. In 2007, he joined Sochaux remaining at the club for four seasons.

In June 2011 Maurice-Belay signed for Bordeaux on a free-transfer. He left the club at the end of the 2016–17 season when his contract expired.

In February 2019, Maurice-Belay joined fourth-tier side Bergerac Périgord. He was reportedly approached after the chairman's son spotted that he was a free agent while playing the video game Football Manager 2019.

In autumn 2019, Maurice-Belay announced his retirement from playing.

== Honours ==
Bordeaux

- Coupe de France: 2012–13
