= 2012–13 AS Monaco FC season =

AS Monaco
2012–13 season
- President: Dmitry Rybolovlev
- Head coach: Claudio Ranieri
- Stadium: Stade Louis II
- Ligue 2: 1st
- Coupe de France: Eighth round vs Bourg-Péronnas
- Coupe de la Ligue: Round of 16 vs Troyes
- Top goalscorer: League: Ibrahima Touré (16); All: Ibrahima Touré (19)
- Highest home attendance: 6,102 vs Dijon; 13 September 2012
- Lowest home attendance: 4,456 vs Valenciennes; 26 September 2012
- Average home league attendance: 5,841; 1 October 2012
Home colours	Away colours	Third colours

The 2012–13 season was AS Monaco FC's second season in Ligue 2 since relegation from Ligue 1 in 2011. Claudio Ranieri takes over as manager of AS Monaco, following the sacking of Marco Simone at the end of the previous season.

== Squad ==
Updated 1 February 2013. Note: Flags indicate national team as defined under FIFA eligibility rules; some limited exceptions apply. Players may hold more than one non-FIFA nationality.

No.	Pos.	Nation	Player
1	GK	CRO	Danijel Subašić
2	MF	FRA	Dennis Appiah
3	DF	FRA	Layvin Kurzawa
4	DF	ALG	Carl Medjani
5	MF	FRA	Gary Coulibaly (vice-captain)
6	MF	FRA	Stéphane Dumont
7	MF	MAR	Nabil Dirar
8	MF	CGO	Delvin N'Dinga
9	FW	URU	Sebastián Ribas (on loan from Genoa)
10	FW	FRA	Emmanuel Rivière
11	FW	SEN	Ibrahima Touré
12	DF	BRA	Adriano
13	DF	FRA	Jérémy Labor
14	MF	DEN	Jakob Poulsen
15	FW	ARG	Lucas Ocampos

No.	Pos.	Nation	Player
16	GK	FRA	Martin Sourzac
17	FW	BEL	Yannick Carrasco
18	FW	FRA	Valère Germain
19	MF	MAR	Mounir Obbadi
20	MF	SWE	Emir Bajrami (on loan from Twente)
21	DF	URU	Gary Kagelmacher
22	DF	GRE	Georgios Tzavelas
23	MF	FRA	Nampalys Mendy
24	DF	ITA	Andrea Raggi
27	DF	FRA	Jérôme Phojo
28	MF	CMR	Edgar Salli
29	DF	FRA	Tristan Dingomé
30	GK	ITA	Flavio Roma
31	DF	GER	Andreas Wolf (captain)
40	GK	FRA	Marc-Aurèle Caillard

=== Reserve Team ===
Note: Flags indicate national team as defined under FIFA eligibility rules; some limited exceptions apply. Players may hold more than one non-FIFA nationality.

No.	Pos.	Nation	Player
41	GK	FRA	Sébastien Chabbert
—	DF	FRA	Yvan Erichot

No.	Pos.	Nation	Player
—	FW	FRA	Frédéric Nimani
—	MF	FRA	Dominique Pandor

=== On loan ===
Note: Flags indicate national team as defined under FIFA eligibility rules; some limited exceptions apply. Players may hold more than one non-FIFA nationality.

No.	Pos.	Nation	Player
22	MF	GRE	Alexandros Tziolis (at APOEL)
25	MF	FRA	Valentin Eysseric (at Nice)
10	FW	NED	Nacer Barazite (at Austria Wien)
—	MF	FRA	Florian Pinteaux (at Sedan)

No.	Pos.	Nation	Player
—	MF	CGO	Chris Malonga (at Lausanne)
—	MF	FRA	Aadil Assana (at Lausanne)
—	FW	FRA	Terence Makengo (at Auxerre)

== Transfers ==
=== Summer ===
In: Note: Flags indicate national team as defined under FIFA eligibility rules; some limited exceptions apply. Players may hold more than one non-FIFA nationality.

No.	Pos.	Nation	Player
8	MF	CGO	Delvin Ndinga (from (France) Auxerre, €5m)
9	FW	URU	Sebastián Ribas (Loan from (Italy) Genoa)
14	DF	DEN	Jakob Poulsen (from (Denmark) Midtjylland, Undisclosed)
15	MF	ARG	Lucas Ocampos (From (Argentina) River Plate)
19	MF	FRA	Kévin Diaz (Loan return from (France) Metz)
20	MF	SWE	Emir Bajrami (on loan from (Netherlands) Twente)
24	DF	ITA	Andrea Raggi (from (Italy) Bologna, Free)
30	GK	ITA	Flavio Roma (from (Italy) Milan, Free)
36	DF	GRE	Giorgios Tzavelas (From (Germany) Eintracht Frankfurt)

Out: Note: Flags indicate national team as defined under FIFA eligibility rules; some limited exceptions apply. Players may hold more than one non-FIFA nationality.

No.	Pos.	Nation	Player
3	DF	FRA	Vincent Muratori (to (France) Nancy)
4	DF	NGR	Rabiu Afolabi
7	MF	CGO	Chris Malonga (Loan to (Switzerland) Lausanne-Sport)
8	MF	FRA	Ludovic Giuly (to (France) Lorient, Free)
9	FW	FRA	Marama Vahirua (Loan return to (France) Nancy)
10	MF	MLI	Sambou Yatabaré (to (France) Bastia)
13	DF	SWE	Petter Hansson (Retired)
14	DF	FRA	Florian Pinteaux (on loan to (France) Sedan)
17	FW	FRA	Terence Makengo (on loan to (France) Auxerre)
19	DF	CIV	Isaac Koné (to (France) Fréjus)
19	MF	FRA	Kévin Diaz (to (France) Nice)
20	MF	HUN	Vladimir Koman (to (Russia) Krasnodar)
22	FW	NOR	Thorstein Helstad (to (Norway) Lillestrøm, Free)
22	MF	GRE	Alexandros Tziolis (on loan to (Cyprus) APOEL)
25	MF	FRA	Valentin Eysseric (on loan to (France) Nice)
27	MF	FRA	Aadil Assana (on loan at (Switzerland) Lausanne)
30	GK	FRA	Johann Carrasso (Loan return to (France) Rennes)
36	DF	GRE	Giorgios Tzavelas (Loan return to (Germany) Eintracht Frankfurt)
—	FW	ROU	Daniel Niculae (to (Russia) Kuban Krasnodar)
—	MF	FRA	Thomas Mangani (to (France) Nancy, Free)

=== Winter ===
In: Note: Flags indicate national team as defined under FIFA eligibility rules; some limited exceptions apply. Players may hold more than one non-FIFA nationality.

No.	Pos.	Nation	Player
4	DF	ALG	Carl Medjani (From (France) Ajaccio)
10	FW	FRA	Emmanuel Rivière (From (France) Toulouse)
19	MF	MAR	Mounir Obbadi (From (France) Troyes)

Out: Note: Flags indicate national team as defined under FIFA eligibility rules; some limited exceptions apply. Players may hold more than one non-FIFA nationality.

No.	Pos.	Nation	Player
10	FW	NED	Nacer Barazite (loan to Austria Wien)
26	DF	FRA	Éric Marester (to (France) Arles-Avignon)

== Competitions ==
=== Friendlies ===
3 July 2012	Monaco	3–0	Wacker Innsbruck
		Summary

6 July 2012	Monaco	1–0	Dynamo Kyiv
		Summary

9 July 2012	Monaco	1–0	Dynamo Kyiv
		Summary

16 July 2012	Monaco	0–1	Newcastle United
		Summary	Ba 32'

=== Ligue 2 ===
==== League table ====
Pos	Team	Pld	W	D	L	GF	GA	GD	Pts	Promotion or Relegation
1	Monaco (C, P)	38	21	13	4	64	33	+31	76	Promotion to Ligue 1
2	Guingamp (P)	38	20	10	8	63	38	+25	70	Promotion to Ligue 1
3	Nantes (P)	38	19	12	7	54	29	+25	69	Promotion to Ligue 1
4	Caen	38	17	12	9	48	28	+20	63	
5	Angers	38	17	10	11	52	39	+13	61	

Source: Ligue 2
Rules for classification: 1) points; 2) goal difference; 3) number of goals scored.
(C) Champions; (P) Promoted

==== Results summary ====
Overall								Home						Away					
Pld	W	D	L	GF	GA	GD	Pts	W	D	L	GF	GA	GD	W	D	L	GF	GA	GD
38	21	13	4	64	33	+31	76	9	8	2	35	19	+16	12	5	2	29	14	+15

Last updated: 24 May 2013.
Source: Soccerway

==== Results by round ====
Round	1	2	3	4	5	6	7	8	9	10	11	12	13	14	15	16	17	18	19	20	21	22	23	24	25	26	27	28	29	30	31	32	33	34	35	36	37	38
Ground	H	A	H	A	H	A	H	A	H	H	A	H	A	H	A	H	A	H	A	H	H	H	A	H	A	H	A	A	H	A	H	A	H	A	H	A	H	A
Result	W	D	W	W	W	L	D	W	D	D	W	L	D	W	W	W	L	D	W	D	W	D	W	W	W	W	W	D	D	D	D	W	W	D	L	W	W	W
Position	1	3	2	1	1	2	2	1	1	1	1	1	2	1	1	1	2	2	2	2	1	2	2	1	1	1	1	1	1	1	1	1	1	1	1	1	1	1

Source: Soccerway
A = Away; H = Home; W = Win; D = Draw; L = Loss

==== Results ====
30 July 2012 1	Monaco	4–0	Tours	Stade Louis II
20:20 CEST (UTC+2)	Carrasco 30'; Raggi 37'; Touré 38'; Germain 44'	Summary	Blayac (yellow card) 38' (yellow-red card) 48'	Attendance: 5,842; Referee: Hakim Ben El Hadj

3 August 2012 2	Laval	0–0	Monaco	Stade Francis Le Basser
19:30 CEST (UTC+2)		Summary		Attendance: 7,112; Referee: Amaury Delerue

10 August 2012 3	Monaco	3–2	Istres	Stade Louis II
18:45 CEST (UTC+2)	Bajrami 25'; Touré 27'; Germain 83'	Summary	De Préville 7', 14'	Attendance: 5,839; Referee: Jérôme Miguelgorry

16 August 2012 4	Guingamp	1–2	Monaco	Stade du Roudourou
14:00 CEST (UTC+2)	Diallo 19'	Summary	Touré 53', 74'	Attendance: 8,407; Referee: Said Ennjimi

24 August 2012 5	Monaco	3–0	Arles-Avignon	Stade Louis II
18:45 CEST (UTC+2)	Touré 39', 88'; Germain 59'	Summary		Attendance: 6,083; Referee: Bartolomeu Varela

31 August 2012 6	Le Havre	2–1	Monaco	Stade Jules Deschaseaux
18:45 CEST (UTC+2)	Bonnet 25'; Rivière 77'	Summary	Kagelmacher 74'	Attendance: 12,330; Referee: Alexandre Castro

13 September 2012 7	Monaco	1–1	Dijon	Stade Louis II
18:45 CEST (UTC+2)	Carrasco 82'	Summary	Jovial 74'	Attendance: 6,102; Referee: Laurent Duhamel

21 September 2012 8	Lens	0–4	Monaco	Stade Félix-Bollaert
18:45 CEST (UTC+2)	Touré (red card) 67'	Summary	Touré 49', 51', 90'; Germain 69' (pen.)	Attendance: 17,141; Referee: Mikael Lesage

30 September 2012 9	Monaco	2–2	Gazélec Ajaccio	Stade Louis II
18:00 CEST (UTC+2)	Germain 76'; Wolf 90'	Summary	Laïfa 18'; Saadi 75' (pen.)	Attendance: 5,077; Referee: Fredy Fautrel

8 October 2012 10	Monaco	0–0	Châteauroux	Stade Louis II
20:30 CEST (UTC+2)		Summary		Attendance: 4,564; Referee: Johann Hamel

19 October 2012 11	Angers	1–2	Monaco	Jean-Bouin Stadium
18:45 CEST (UTC+2)	Diers 80'; Boyer (red card) 85'	Summary	Adriano (yellow card) 19' (yellow-red card) 40'; Carrasco 45+2'; Touré 48'	Attendance: 14,168; Referee: Clement Turpin

27 October 2012 12	Monaco	0–2	Nantes	Stade Louis II
14:00 CEST (UTC+2)		Summary	Đorđević 25', 35'	Attendance: 5,891; Referee: Amaury Delerue

2 November 2012 13	Niort	1–1	Monaco	Stade René Gaillard
18:45 CET (UTC+1)	Lafourcade 68'; Roye (red card) 80'	Summary	Touré 90+2'	Attendance: 7,294; Referee: Christian Guillard

10 November 2012 14	Monaco	2–0	Auxerre	Stade Louis II
14:00 CET (UTC+1)	Touré 12'; Wolf 54'	Summary	Mandjeck (yellow card) 36' (yellow-red card) 44'; Haddad (red card) 71'	Attendance: 4,798; Referee: Olivier Thual

22 November 2012 15	Clermont	0–1	Monaco	Stade Gabriel Montpied
20:30 CET (UTC+1)		Summary	Touré 64'	Attendance: 6,815; Referee: Abdelali Chaoui

30 November 2012 16	Monaco	3–1	Sedan	Stade Louis II
18:45 CET (UTC+1)	Raggi 9'; Kagelmacher 74'; Touré 90+3' (pen.)	Summary	Pogba 87'	Attendance: 4,192; Referee: Frank Schneider

11 December 2012 17	Caen	3–0	Monaco	Stade Michel d'Ornano
20:55 CET (UTC+1)	Duhamel 17'; Cuvillier 45+1'; Nabab 71'	Summary	Subašić (red card) 43'	Attendance: 13,262; Referee: Alexandre Castro

14 December 2012 18	Monaco	1–1	Nîmes	Stade Louis II
18:45 CET (UTC+1)	Tzavelas 45+2'	Summary	Gragnic 4'	Attendance: 4,303; Referee: Wilfried Bien

22 December 2012 19	Le Mans	2–3	Monaco	MMArena
14:00 CET (UTC+1)	Coulibaly 53' (o.g.); Sanson 66'	Summary	Carrasco 24' (pen.); Touré 51', 82'	Attendance: 8,576; Referee: Tony Chapron

14 January 2013 20	Monaco	1–1	Laval	Stade Louis II
20:30 CET (UTC+1)	Germain 41'	Summary	Viale 45+1'	Attendance: 4,089; Referee: Cedric Cotrel

18 January 2013 21	Istres	0–2	Monaco	Stade Parsemain
20:00 CET (UTC+1)		Summary	Kagelmacher 71'; Ocampos 81'	Attendance: 3,056; Referee: Laurent Duhamel

26 January 2013 22	Monaco	2–2	Guingamp	Stade Louis II
14:00 CET (UTC+1)	Yatabaré 12' (o.g.); Adriano 90'	Summary	Douniama 40'; Yatabaré 49'	Attendance: 4,512; Referee: Ruddy Buquet

4 February 2013 23	Arles-Avignon	0–2	Monaco	Parc des Sports
20:30 CET (UTC+1)		Summary	Rivière 69'; Ocampos 90'	Attendance: 3,085

8 February 2013 24	Monaco	2–1	Le Havre	Stade Louis II
20:00 CET (UTC+1)	Germain 1', 76'	Summary	Bonnet 35'	Attendance: 4,371; Referee: Sebastian Moreira

18 February 2013 25	Dijon	0–2	Monaco	Stade Gaston Gérard
20:30 CET (UTC+1)		Summary	Germain 27', 43'	Attendance: 12,126; Referee: Fredy Fautrel

25 February 2013 26	Monaco	2–1	RC Lens	Stade Louis II
20:30 CET (UTC+1)	Dirar 38'; Raggi 47'	Summary	Touzghar 67'	Attendance: 5,549; Referee: Frank Schneider

1 March 2013 27	Gazélec Ajaccio	0–1	Monaco	Stade Ange Casanova
20:00 CET (UTC+1)	Bocognano (yellow card) 36' (red card) 42'	Summary	Tzavelas 20'	Attendance: 2,042; Referee: Tony Chapron

8 March 2013 28	Châteauroux	1–1	Monaco	Stade Gaston Petit
20:00 CET (UTC+1)	Jeannot 52' (pen.)	Summary	Germain 38'	Attendance: 7,130; Referee: Sebastian Desiage

15 March 2013 29	Monaco	2–2	Angers	Stade Louis II
20:00 CET (UTC+1)	Dirar 33'; Rivière 59'	Summary	Diers 4'; Keserü 40'	Attendance: 4,531; Referee: Philippe Kalt

30 March 2013 30	Nantes	1–1	Monaco	Stade de la Beaujoire
14:00 CET (UTC+1)	A.Trebel 43'	Summary	Riou 62' (o.g.)	Attendance: 36,471; Referee: Ruddy Buquet

5 April 2013 31	Monaco	1–1	Niortais	Stade Louis II
20:00 CEST (UTC+2)	Ocampos 44'	[ Summary]	Roye 35'	Attendance: 4,372; Referee: Alexandre Castro

13 April 2013 32	Auxerre	0–2	Monaco	Stade de l'Abbé-Deschamps
14:00 CEST (UTC+2)		Summary	Carrasco 26', 45+3' (pen.)	Attendance: 9,156; Referee: Sebastian Moreira

22 April 2013 33	Monaco	4–0	Clermont Foot	Stade Louis II
20:40 CEST (UTC+2)	Germain 16'; Dirar 45'; Ocampos 79'; Rivière 87'	Summary	Jouan (red card) 71'	Attendance: 5,066; Referee: Yohann Rouinsard

29 April 2012 34	Sedan	1–1	Monaco	Stade Louis Dugauguez
20:30 CEST (UTC+2)	Pogba 28'	Summary	Raggi 15'	Attendance: 6,300; Referee: Jean Cailleux

4 May 2013 35	Monaco	0–1	Caen	Stade Louis II
14:00 CEST (UTC+2)		Summary	Poyet 8'	Attendance: 7,123; Referee: Said Ennjimi

11 May 2013 36	Nîmes	0–1	Monaco	Stade des Costières
14:00 CEST (UTC+2)	Poulain (red card) 24'	Summary	Touré 90+4'	Attendance: 7,928; Referee: Tony Chapron

17 May 2013 37	Monaco	2–1	Le Mans	Stade Louis II
20:30 CEST (UTC+2)	Touré 25'; Germain 37' (pen.); Touré (red card) 69'	Summary	Sylla 84'	Attendance: 8,058; Referee: Antony Gautier

24 May 2013 38	Tours	1–2	Monaco	Stade de la Vallée du Cher
20:30 CEST (UTC+2)	Kouakou 20'	Summary	Rivière 53'; Germain 90'

=== Coupe de la Ligue ===
7 August 2012 First Round	Nîmes	1–1 (a.e.t.) (5–6 p)	Monaco	Stade des Costières, Nîmes
20:00 CEST UTC+2	Thibault 43'	Summary; Report	Barazite 71'	Attendance: 5,825; Referee: Jean-Charles Cailleux
	Penalties
	Stošić (penalty scored); Ben Yahia (penalty scored); Parpeix (penalty scored); Robail (penalty scored); Amewou (penalty scored); Benezet (penalty missed)		(penalty scored) Adriano; (penalty scored) Dumont; (penalty scored) Raggi; (penalty scored) Touré; (penalty scored) Labor; (penalty scored) Mendy

28 August 2012 Second Round	Niort	1–2	Monaco	Stade René Gaillard, Niort
20:00 CEST UTC+2	Durak 50'	Summary; Report	Touré 1'; Poulsen 46'	Attendance: 6,252; Referee: Benoît Millot

26 September 2012 Third Round	Monaco	4–2 (a.e.t.)	Valenciennes	Stade Louis II, Fontvieille
20:55 CEST UTC+2	Touré 38', 120'; Carrasco 45' (pen.); Ocampos 104'	Summary; Report	Danic 5'; Wolf 32' (o.g.)	Attendance: 4,456; Referee: Phillippe Kalt (Alsace)

30 October 2012 Round of 16	Monaco	1–2	Troyes	Stade Louis II, Fontvieille
20:00 CET UTC+1	Carrasco 25' (pen.)	Summary; Report	Rincón 65'; Othon 81'; Yattara (yellow card) 39' (yellow-red card) 86'	Referee: Alexandre Castro

=== Coupe de France ===
17 November 2012 Seventh Round	Toulon	1–3 (a.e.t.)	Monaco	Toulon
15:15 CET (UTC+1)	R.Dob 63'	Report	Kurzawa 32'; Germain 108', 119'	Stadium: Stade Bon Rencontre; Referee: Didier Falcone

8 December 2012 Eighth Round	Monaco	0–0 (a.e.t.) (6–7 p)	Bourg-Péronnas	Fontvieille
16:00 CET (UTC+1)	Dingomé (red card) 111'	Report		Stadium: Stade Louis II; Referee: Nicolas Rainville
	Penalties
	Adriano (penalty scored); Touré (penalty scored); Coulibaly (penalty scored); Appiah (penalty scored); Carrasco (penalty scored); Labor (penalty scored); Germain (penalty missed)		(penalty scored) M. Moisy; (penalty scored) P. Dimitriou; (penalty scored) E. Kehound; (penalty scored) Faivre; (penalty scored) Di Tommaso; (penalty scored) A. Ben Meloucka; (penalty scored) R. Barbet

== Squad statistics ==
As of 17 May 2013

=== Appearances and goals ===
No.	Pos	Nat	Player	Total		Ligue 2		Coupe de France		Coupe de la Ligue	
No.	Pos	Nat	Player	Apps	Goals	Apps	Goals	Apps	Goals	Apps	Goals
1	GK	(Croatia) CRO	Danijel Subašić	36	0	35+0	0	0+0	0	1+0	0
2	DF	(France) FRA	Dennis Appiah	9	0	1+5	0	2+0	0	0+1	0
3	DF	(France) FRA	Layvin Kurzawa	13	1	7+1	0	2+0	1	1+2	0
4	DF	(Algeria) ALG	Carl Medjani	14	0	14+0	0	0+0	0	0+0	0
5	MF	(France) FRA	Gary Coulibaly	19	0	14+2	0	1+1	0	1+0	0
6	MF	(France) FRA	Stéphane Dumont	7	0	5+1	0	0+0	0	0+1	0
7	MF	(Morocco) MAR	Nabil Dirar	35	3	29+3	3	0+0	0	2+1	0
8	MF	(Republic of the Congo) CGO	Delvin N'Dinga	28	0	7+17	0	2+0	0	2+0	0
10	FW	(France) FRA	Emmanuel Rivière	13	3	4+9	3	0+0	0	0+0	0
11	FW	(Senegal) SEN	Ibrahima Touré	40	21	27+7	18	1+1	0	3+1	3
12	DF	(Brazil) BRA	Adriano	20	1	9+6	1	2+0	0	3+0	0
13	DF	(France) FRA	Jérémy Labor	2	0	0+0	0	1+0	0	1+0	0
14	MF	(Denmark) DEN	Jakob Poulsen	20	0	7+8	0	2+0	0	2+1	0
15	FW	(Argentina) ARG	Lucas Ocampos	32	5	12+16	4	2+0	0	0+2	1
16	GK	(France) FRA	Martin Sourzac	8	0	2+1	0	2+0	0	3+0	0
17	FW	(Belgium) BEL	Yannick Carrasco	30	8	20+6	6	1+1	0	2+0	2
18	FW	(France) FRA	Valère Germain	38	15	32+2	13	1+1	2	1+1	0
19	MF	(Morocco) MAR	Mounir Obbadi	16	0	15+1	0	0+0	0	0+0	0
20	MF	(Sweden) SWE	Emir Bajrami	14	1	4+5	1	1+1	0	2+1	0
21	DF	(Uruguay) URU	Gary Kagelmacher	36	3	33+0	3	1+0	0	2+0	0
22	DF	(Greece) GRE	Giorgios Tzavelas	27	2	23+1	2	0+0	0	2+1	0
23	MF	(France) FRA	Nampalys Mendy	35	0	31+0	0	0+0	0	4+0	0
24	DF	(Italy) ITA	Andrea Raggi	37	4	34+0	4	0+0	0	3+0	0
25	MF	(France) FRA	Valentin Eysseric	2	0	1+0	0	0+0	0	1+0	0
27	DF	(France) FRA	Jérôme Phojo	2	0	0+0	0	0+0	0	2+0	0
28	MF	(Cameroon) CMR	Edgar Salli	1	0	0+1	0	0+0	0	0+0	0
29	MF	(France) FRA	Tristan Dingomé	21	0	13+3	0	1+1	0	3+0	0
31	DF	(Germany) GER	Andreas Wolf	21	2	18+2	2	0+0	0	1+0	0
Players away from the club on loan:
10	FW	(Netherlands) NED	Nacer Barazite	4	1	0+3	0	0+0	0	1+0	1
Players who appeared for Monaco no longer at the club:
26	DF	(France) FRA	Éric Marester	9	0	8+0	0	0+0	0	1+0	0

=== Top scorers ===
Place	Position	Nation	Number	Name	Ligue 2	Coupe de France	Coupe de la Ligue	Total
1	FW	(Senegal)	11	Ibrahima Touré	18	0	3	21
2	FW	(France)	18	Valère Germain	13	2	0	15
3	FW	(Belgium)	17	Yannick Carrasco	6	0	2	8
4	FW	(Argentina)	15	Lucas Ocampos	4	0	1	5
5	DF	(Italy)	24	Andrea Raggi	4	0	0	4
6	DF	(Uruguay)	21	Gary Kagelmacher	3	0	0	3
6	FW	(France)	10	Emmanuel Rivière	3	0	0	3
6	MF	(Morocco)	7	Nabil Dirar	3	0	0	3
9	DF	(Germany)	31	Andreas Wolf	2	0	0	2
9	DF	(Greece)	22	Giorgios Tzavelas	2	0	0	2
9				Own goal	2	0	0	2
12	MF	(Sweden)	20	Emir Bajrami	1	0	0	1
12	DF	(Brazil)	12	Adriano	1	0	0	1
12	FW	(Netherlands)	10	Nacer Barazite	0	0	1	1
12	MF	(Denmark)	14	Jakob Poulsen	0	0	1	1
12	DF	(France)	3	Layvin Kurzawa	0	1	0	1
				TOTALS	61	3	8	72

=== Disciplinary record ===
Number	Nation	Position	Name	Ligue 2		Coupe de France		Coupe de la Ligue		Total	
Number	Nation	Position	Name	Yellow card	Red card	Yellow card	Red card	Yellow card	Red card	Yellow card	Red card
1	(Croatia)	GK	Danijel Subašić	1	1	0	0	0	0	1	1
2	(France)	DF	Dennis Appiah	0	0	0	0	1	0	1	0
3	(France)	DF	Layvin Kurzawa	0	0	0	0	1	0	1	0
4	(Algeria)	DF	Carl Medjani	3	0	0	0	0	0	3	0
6	(France)	MF	Stéphane Dumont	1	0	0	0	0	0	1	0
7	(Morocco)	MF	Nabil Dirar	4	0	0	0	0	0	4	0
8	(Republic of the Congo)	MF	Delvin N'Dinga	1	0	1	0	0	0	2	0
10	(France)	FW	Emmanuel Rivière	1	0	0	0	0	0	1	0
11	(Senegal)	FW	Ibrahima Touré	0	1	0	0	1	0	1	1
12	(Brazil)	DF	Adriano	3	1	1	0	0	0	4	1
13	(France)	DF	Jérémy Labor	0	0	0	0	1	0	1	0
15	(Argentina)	FW	Lucas Ocampos	4	0	0	0	0	0	4	0
16	(France)	GK	Martin Sourzac	1	0	0	0	0	0	1	0
17	(Belgium)	FW	Yannick Carrasco	2	0	0	0	0	0	2	0
18	(France)	FW	Valère Germain	3	0	0	0	0	0	3	0
19	(Morocco)	MF	Mounir Obbadi	1	0	0	0	0	0	1	0
20	(Sweden)	MF	Emir Bajrami	1	0	0	0	0	0	1	0
21	(Uruguay)	DF	Gary Kagelmacher	5	0	0	0	0	0	5	0
22	(Greece)	DF	Giorgios Tzavelas	10	0	0	0	0	0	10	0
23	(France)	MF	Nampalys Mendy	6	0	0	0	1	0	7	0
24	(Italy)	DF	Andrea Raggi	4	0	0	0	1	0	5	0
25	(France)	MF	Valentin Eysseric	1	0	0	0	0	0	1	0
27	(France)	DF	Jérôme Phojo	0	0	0	0	1	0	1	0
29	(France)	MF	Tristan Dingomé	1	0	1	1	0	0	2	1
31	(Germany)	DF	Andreas Wolf	5	0	0	0	1	0	6	0
			TOTALS	58	3	3	1	8	0	69	4
