= 2011–12 AS Monaco FC season =

AS Monaco
2011–12 season
- President: Dmitry Rybolovlev
- Head coach: Marco Simone
- Stadium: Stade Louis II
- Ligue 2: 8th
- Coupe de France: Round of 64 vs Angers
- Coupe de la Ligue: 1st round vs Sedan
- Top goalscorer: League: Ibrahima Touré (10); All: Two Players (10)
- Highest home attendance: 6,617 vs Reims; 15 August 2011
- Lowest home attendance: 3,800 vs Arles-Avignon; 19 September 2011
- Average home league attendance: 4,611
Home colours	Away colours	Third colours

The 2011–12 season was AS Monaco FC's first season back in Ligue 2 since relegation from Ligue 1 in 2011. Marco Simone took over as coach of AS Monaco in September 2011 following the sacking of Laurent Banide. They finished the season in eighth place having struggled in the relegation zone for the majority of the season. They also participated in the Coupe de France where they were eliminated at the Round of 64 stage by Angers, and the Coupe de la Ligue which they were knocked out of in the first round by Sedan.

== Season review ==
On 23 December 2011, Russian billionaire businessman Dmitry Rybolovlev bought a majority stake in AS Monaco. Rybolovlev was stated as saying "I think this club has enormous potential. I hope it can now realise this potential, both domestically and in Europe."

== Squad ==
As of 31 January 2012.

Note: Flags indicate national team as defined under FIFA eligibility rules; some limited exceptions apply. Players may hold more than one non-FIFA nationality.

No.	Pos.	Nation	Player
1	GK	FRA	Sébastien Chabbert
2	DF	FRA	Dennis Appiah
3	DF	FRA	Vincent Muratori
4	DF	NGR	Rabiu Afolabi
5	MF	FRA	Gary Coulibaly
6	MF	FRA	Stéphane Dumont
7	MF	CGO	Chris Malonga
8	MF	FRA	Ludovic Giuly (captain)
9	FW	TAH	Marama Vahirua (on loan from Nancy)
10	MF	MLI	Sambou Yatabaré
11	FW	SEN	Ibrahima Touré
12	DF	BRA	Adriano
13	DF	SWE	Petter Hansson
14	DF	FRA	Florian Pinteaux
15	DF	FRA	Layvin Kurzawa
16	GK	FRA	Martin Sourzac
17	FW	FRA	Terence Makengo
18	FW	FRA	Valère Germain
19	DF	CIV	Isaac Koné

No.	Pos.	Nation	Player
20	MF	HUN	Vladimir Koman
21	DF	URU	Gary Kagelmacher
22	FW	NOR	Thorstein Helstad
23	DF	FRA	Olivier Ferblantier
24	MF	FRA	Nampalys Mendy
25	MF	FRA	Valentin Eysseric
26	DF	FRA	Eric Marester
27	MF	FRA	Aadil Assana
28	MF	CMR	Edgar Salli
29	DF	FRA	Tristan Dingomé
30	GK	FRA	Johann Carrasso (on loan from Rennes)
31	DF	GER	Andreas Wolf
32	MF	MAR	Nabil Dirar
36	DF	GRE	Georgios Tzavellas
38	MF	GRE	Alexandros Tziolis
39	FW	NED	Nacer Barazite
40	GK	CRO	Danijel Subašić
--	DF	FRA	Yvan Erichot

=== On loan ===
Note: Flags indicate national team as defined under FIFA eligibility rules; some limited exceptions apply. Players may hold more than one non-FIFA nationality.

No.	Pos.	Nation	Player
20	MF	FRA	Kévin Malcuit (at Vannes)
—	FW	ROU	Daniel Niculae (at Nancy)
—	MF	FRA	Thomas Mangani (at Nancy)

No.	Pos.	Nation	Player
—	MF	FRA	Kévin Diaz (at FC Metz)
—	GK	FRA	Franck L'Hostis (at Martigues)
—	FW	FRA	Frédéric Nimani (at PAOK)

== Transfers ==
=== Summer ===
In: Note: Flags indicate national team as defined under FIFA eligibility rules; some limited exceptions apply. Players may hold more than one non-FIFA nationality.

No.	Pos.	Nation	Player
4	DF	NGR	Rabiu Afolabi ( (Austria) Red Bull Salzburg, Undisclosed)
6	MF	FRA	Stéphane Dumont ( (France) Lille, Free)
8	MF	FRA	Ludovic Giuly ( (France) Paris Saint-Germain, Free)
9	MF	TAH	Marama Vahirua ( (France) Nancy, Loan)
10	MF	MLI	Sambou Yatabaré ( (France) Caen,)
22	FW	NOR	Thorstein Helstad ( (France) Le Mans, Undisclosed)
26	DF	FRA	Eric Marester ( (France) Troyes, Free)
28	FW	CMR	Edgar Salli ( (Cameroon) Sport de Garoua, Undisclosed)
30	GK	FRA	Johann Carrasso ( (France) Rennes, Loan)
—	DF	TOG	Senah Mango ( (France) Marseille, Loan)
—	MF	SWE	Emir Bajrami ( (Netherlands) Twente, Undisclosed)

Out: Note: Flags indicate national team as defined under FIFA eligibility rules; some limited exceptions apply. Players may hold more than one non-FIFA nationality.

No.	Pos.	Nation	Player
—	DF	CMR	Nicolas N'Koulou (to (France) Marseille, €3.5m)
—	GK	FRA	Stéphane Ruffier (to (France) Saint-Étienne, €3m)
11	FW	CMR	Benjamin Moukandjo (to (France) Nancy, Undisclosed)
—	GK	FRA	Yohann Thuram-Ulien (to (France) Troyes, Undisclosed)
—	MF	FRA	Mathieu Coutadeur (to (France) FC Lorient, Undisclosed)
—	DF	FRA	Laurent Bonnart (to (France) Lille, Free)
—	MF	COD	Distel Zola (to (France) Nancy, Free)
—	DF	COD	Cédric Mongongu (to (France) Evian, Free)
—	MF	GAB	Frédéric Bulot (to (France) Caen, Free)
—	MF	FRA	Léo Schwechlen (to (France) Tours, Free)
31	MF	FRA	Kévin Diaz (to (France) Metz, Loan)
21	FW	ROU	Daniel Niculae (to (France) Nancy, Loan)
15	MF	FRA	Thomas Mangani (to (France) Nancy, Loan)
11	MF	FRA	Frédéric Nimani (to (Greece) PAOK, Loan)

=== Winter ===
In: Note: Flags indicate national team as defined under FIFA eligibility rules; some limited exceptions apply. Players may hold more than one non-FIFA nationality.

No.	Pos.	Nation	Player
11	FW	SEN	Ibrahima Touré ( (United Arab Emirates) Ajman Club, Undisclosed)
20	MF	HUN	Vladimir Koman ( (Italy) Sampdoria, Undisclosed)
31	DF	GER	Andreas Wolf ( (Germany) Werder Bremen, Undisclosed)
32	MF	MAR	Nabil Dirar ( (Belgium) Club Brugge, €7.5m)
36	DF	GRE	Georgios Tzavellas ( (Germany) Eintracht Frankfurt, Undisclosed)
38	DF	GRE	Alexandros Tziolis ( (Spain) Racing Santander, Free)
39	FW	NED	Nacer Barazite ( Austria Wien, Free)
40	GK	CRO	Danijel Subašić ( (Croatia) Hajduk Split, Undisclosed)

Out: Note: Flags indicate national team as defined under FIFA eligibility rules; some limited exceptions apply. Players may hold more than one non-FIFA nationality.

No.	Pos.	Nation	Player

== Competitions ==
=== Ligue 2 ===
==== League table ====
Pos	Team	Pld	W	D	L	GF	GA	GD	Pts
6	Tours	38	15	11	12	44	43	+1	56
7	Guingamp	38	15	10	13	46	43	+3	55
8	Monaco	38	13	13	12	41	48	−7	52
9	Nantes	38	14	9	15	51	42	+9	51
10	Istres	38	13	12	13	46	44	+2	51

Source: Ligue 2
Rules for classification: 1) points; 2) goal difference; 3) number of goals scored.

==== Results summary ====
Overall								Home						Away					
Pld	W	D	L	GF	GA	GD	Pts	W	D	L	GF	GA	GD	W	D	L	GF	GA	GD
38	13	13	12	41	48	−7	52	7	7	5	21	22	−1	6	6	7	20	26	−6

Last updated: 25 November 2011.
Source: Soccerway

==== Results by round ====
Round	1	2	3	4	5	6	7	8	9	10	11	12	13	14	15	16	17	18	19	20	21	22	23	24	25	26	27	28	29	30	31	32	33	34	35	36	37	38
Ground	H	A	H	H	A	H	A	H	A	H	A	H	A	H	A	H	A	H	A	A	H	H	A	H	A	A	H	A	H	A	H	A	H	A	H	A	H	A
Result	D	D	L	D	D	L	D	W	L	D	L	D	L	D	L	L	D	D	W	W	D	L	L	W	D	W	W	D	W	W	W	W	W	L	W	L	L	W
Position	13	12	17	17	15	17	18	16	19	20	20	20	20	20	20	20	20	20	19	18	18	19	19	19	19	18	17	17	16	14	11	9	8	11	7	9	10	8

Source: Soccerway
A = Away; H = Home; W = Win; D = Draw; L = Loss

==== Fixtures & results ====
1 August 2011 1	Monaco	0–0	US Boulogne	Stade Louis II
		Summary		Attendance: 5,133

6 August 2011 2	Troyes	1–1	Monaco	Stade de l'Aube
	Bettiol 69'	Summary	Nimani 16'	Attendance: 8,520

15 August 2011 3	Monaco	1–2	Reims	Stade Louis II
	Germain 90+5'; Koné (yellow card) 60' (yellow-red card) 90+2'	Summary	Amalfitano 35'; Ghilas 48'	Attendance: 6,617

19 August 2011 4	Monaco	1–1	Amiens	Stade Louis II
	Salli 39'; Mendy (red card) 70'	Summary	Bazile 67' (pen.)	Attendance: 4,989

29 August 2011 5	Lens	2–2	Monaco	Stade Félix Bollaert
	Yahia 76'; Demont 84'	Summary	Mangani 31'; Giuly 90'	Attendance: 23,056

9 September 2011 6	Monaco	1–3	Angers	Stade Louis II
	Vahirua 68' (pen.)	Summary	Charbonnier 16', 34'; Keseru 62'	Attendance: 4,141

16 September 2011 7	Bastia	1–1	Monaco	Stade Armand Cesari
	Maoulida 39'; Maoulida (yellow card) 59' (yellow-red card) 90+1'	Summary	Eysseric 39'; Adriano (red card) 90+1'	Attendance: 11,994

19 September 2011 8	Monaco	1–0	Arles-Avignon	Stade Louis II
	Afolabi 54'	Summary		Attendance: 3,800

23 September 2011 9	Laval	1–0	Monaco	Stade Francis Le Basser
	Gamboa 82'	Summary		Attendance: 8,377

30 September 2011 10	Monaco	2–2	Sedan	Stade Louis II
	Germain 20'; Coulibaly 29'	Summary	Eudeline 47'; Court 84'	Attendance: 4,133

17 October 2011 11	Guingamp	4–0	Monaco	Stade du Roudourou
	Atık 16'; Giresse 39' (pen.); Argelier 42'; Knockaert 79'	Summary		Attendance: 9,483

21 October 2011 12	Monaco	0–0	Tours	Stade Louis II
		Summary		Attendance: 3,939

28 October 2011 13	Châteauroux	2–1	Monaco	Stade Gaston Petit
	Orinel 14'; Bourgeois 17'	Summary	Germain 82'	Attendance: 7,761

5 November 2011 14	Monaco	2–2	Le Mans	Stade Louis II
	Malonga 24'; Vahirua 86'	Summary	Ekeng 34'; Ouali 70'	Attendance: 3,808

25 November 2011 15	Nantes	3–0	Monaco	La Beaujoire-Louis Fonteneau
	Raspentino 32', 53'; Pancrate 90+3'	Summary

2 December 2011 16	Monaco	0–2	Metz	Stade Louis II
		Summary	Duhamel 11'; Bouby 66'	Attendance: 3,869

17 December 2011 17	Le Havre	2–2	Monaco	Stade Jules Deschaseaux
	Ryan 34', 78'	Summary	Germain 44', 45'	Attendance: 11,248

20 December 2011 18	Monaco	0–0	Clermont	Stade Louis II
		Summary

14 January 2012 19	Istres	0–1	Monaco	Stade Parsemain
		Summary	Giuly 15'

18 January 2012 20	Amiens	1–2	Monaco	Stade de la Licorne
	Martin 83'	Summary	Salli 13'; Dingomé 60'	Attendance: 10,993

30 January 2012 21	Monaco	2–2	RC Lens	Stade Louis II
	Germain 49'; Yatabaré 55'	Summary	Toudic 69', 90+3'	Attendance: 4,581

13 February 2012 23	Monaco	0–1	Bastia	Stade Louis II
		Summary	Diallo 87'

17 February 2012 24	Arles-Avignon	2–1	Monaco	Parc des Sports
	Abdelhamid 7'; Yattara 20'	Summary	Touré 54'	Attendance: 3,239

24 February 2012 25	Monaco	2–1	Laval	Stade Louis II
	Dirar 32'; Germain 81'	Summary	Viale 17'	Attendance: 4,049

2 March 2012 26	Sedan	2–2	Monaco	Stade Louis Dugauguez
	Fauvergue 17', 31'	Summary	Touré 71'; Salli 89'

6 March 2012 22^{1}	Angers	1–2	Monaco	Jean-Bouin Stadium
	Doré 25'	Summary	Touré 28', 35'

9 March 2012 27	Monaco	1–0	Guingamp	Stade Louis II
	Touré 70'	Summary		Attendance: 4,388

16 March 2012 28	Tours	0–0	Monaco	Stade de la Vallée du Cher
		Summary	Hansson (red card) 36'	Attendance: 7,499

23 March 2012 29	Monaco	2–1	Châteauroux	Stade Louis II
20:00	Salli 3'; Dirar 55'	Summary	Moulin 67'	Attendance: 4,073

30 March 2012 30	Le Mans	0–1	Monaco	MMArena
		Summary	Touré 49'	Attendance: 8,893

6 April 2012 31	Monaco	2–1	Nantes	Stade Louis II
	Touré 28' (pen.); Germain 66'	Summary	Djilobodji 75'	Attendance: 5,583

13 April 2012 32	Metz	0–2	Monaco	Stade Municipal Saint-Symphorien
		Summary	Giuly 7'; Salli 83'

20 April 2012 33	Monaco	1–0	Le Havre	Stade Louis II
	Touré 48'	Summary		Attendance: 4,995

27 April 2012 34	Clermont	1–0	Monaco	Stade Gabriel Montpied
	Alessandrini 78'	Summary		Attendance: 9,814

1 May 2012 35	Monaco	3–2	Istres	Stade Louis II
	Touré 54'; Tzavelas 69'; Dirar 83'	Summary	De Preville 57'; Palmieri 66'	Attendance: 4,882

7 May 2012 36	Stade de Reims	2–0	Monaco	Stade Auguste Delaune II
	Fauré 3'; Weber 71'	Summary

11 May 2012 37	Monaco	0–2	Troyes	Stade Louis II
		Summary	Marcos 21'; Obbadi 56'	Attendance: 4,735

18 May 2012 38	US Boulogne	1–2	Monaco	Stade de la Libération
	Bru 4'	Summary	Touré 11'; Subašić 57'; Coulibaly (red card) 70'	Attendance: 8,035

Notes

- The match between Angers and Monaco was postponed due to a frozen pitch.

=== Coupe de la Ligue ===
23 July 2011 First Round	Sedan	4–1	Monaco	Stade Louis Dugauguez
	Fauvergue 9', 50'; Gragnic 18'; Court 63'	Summary	Adriano 67'	Attendance: 6,216

=== Coupe de France ===
19 November 2011 Seventh Round	Alès	0–5	Monaco	Stade Pierre Pibarot
		Report	Vahirua 3'; Dingomé 10'; Adriano 50'; Germain 68', 76'

9 December 2011 Eighth Round	La Tour-Saint Clair	0–2	Monaco	Stade Grammont
		Report; Summary	Salli 14'; Eysseric 90+1'	Attendance: 4,000

9 January 2012 Round of 64	Angers	4–3	Monaco	Stade Jean Bouin
	Gómez 11'; Charbonnier 27' (pen.); Keserü 35', 89' (pen.)	Report; Summary	Salli 22'; Giuly 28', 44'

== Squad statistics ==
=== Appearances and goals ===
As of 14 May 2012

No.	Pos	Nat	Player	Total		Ligue 2		Coupe de France		Coupe de la Ligue	
No.	Pos	Nat	Player	Apps	Goals	Apps	Goals	Apps	Goals	Apps	Goals
1	GK	(France) FRA	Sébastien Chabbert	7	0	6	0	0	0	1	0
2	DF	(France) FRA	Dennis Appiah	19	0	16+2	0	1	0	0	0
3	DF	(France) FRA	Vincent Muratori	13	0	10	0	2	0	1	0
4	DF	(Nigeria) NGR	Rabiu Afolabi	15	1	14+1	1	0	0	0	0
5	DF	(France) FRA	Gary Coulibaly	34	1	29+2	1	3	0	0	0
6	DF	(France) FRA	Stéphane Dumont	14	0	8+4	0	1	0	1	0
7	MF	(Republic of the Congo) CGO	Chris Malonga	8	1	3+5	1	0	0	0	0
8	FW	(France) FRA	Ludovic Giuly	28	5	26	3	2	2	0	0
9	FW	(French Polynesia) TAH	Marama Vahirua	13	3	7+4	2	1+1	1	0	0
10	FW	(Mali) MLI	Sambou Yatabaré	9	1	8	1	1	0	0	0
11	FW	(Senegal) SEN	Ibrahima Touré	17	10	15+2	10	0	0	0	0
12	DF	(Brazil) BRA	Adriano	15	2	13	0	1	1	1	1
13	DF	(Sweden) SWE	Petter Hansson	20	0	15+1	0	3	0	1	0
14	DF	(France) FRA	Florian Pinteaux	13	0	8+3	0	1+1	0	0	0
15	DF	(France) FRA	Layvin Kurzawa	5	0	5	0	0	0	0	0
16	GK	(France) FRA	Martin Sourzac	8	0	5+1	0	2	0	0	0
17	FW	(France) FRA	Terence Makengo	12	0	7+4	0	0+1	0	0	0
18	FW	(France) FRA	Valère Germain	37	10	22+11	8	1+2	2	1	0
19	DF	(Ivory Coast) CIV	Isaac Koné	4	0	2+1	0	0	0	0+1	0
20	MF	(Hungary) HUN	Vladimir Koman	17	0	15+2	0	0	0	0	0
21	DF	(Uruguay) URU	Gary Kagelmacher	17	0	17	0	0	0	0	0
22	FW	(Norway) NOR	Thorstein Helstad	8	0	3+3	0	1	0	1	0
24	MF	(France) FRA	Nampalys Mendy	29	0	16+12	0	0	0	1	0
25	MF	(France) FRA	Valentin Eysseric	19	2	12+3	1	1+2	1	1	0
26	DF	(France) FRA	Eric Marester	30	0	26+2	0	2	0	0	0
27	MF	(France) FRA	Aadil Assana	7	0	0+5	0	2	0	0	0
28	MF	(Cameroon) CMR	Edgar Salli	30	7	19+9	5	2	2	0	0
29	DF	(France) FRA	Tristan Dingomé	24	2	13+8	1	3	1	0	0
30	GK	(France) FRA	Johann Carrasso	9	0	8	0	1	0	0	0
31	DF	(Germany) GER	Andreas Wolf	2	0	2	0	0	0	0	0
32	MF	(Morocco) MAR	Nabil Dirar	15	3	11+4	3	0	0	0	0
36	DF	(Greece) GRE	Giorgios Tzavelas	14	0	14	0	0	0	0	0
38	DF	(Greece) GRE	Alexandros Tziolis	3	0	3	0	0	0	0	0
39	FW	(Netherlands) NED	Nacer Barazite	7	0	2+5	0	0	0	0	0
40	GK	(Croatia) CRO	Danijel Subašić	16	1	16	1	0	0	0	0
	DF	(France) FRA	Jérémy Labor	3	0	2	0	1	0	0	0
	GK	(France) FRA	Marc-Aurele Caillerd	1	0	1	0	0	0	0	0
	DF	(France) FRA	Jérôme Phojo	1	0	1	0	0	0	0	0
Players who appeared for Monaco no longer at the club:
11	FW	(Cameroon) CMR	Benjamin Moukandjo	0	0	0	0	0	0	0	0
11	FW	(France) FRA	Frédéric Nimani	4	1	1+2	1	0	0	1	0
15	MF	(France) FRA	Thomas Mangani	5	1	1+3	1	0	0	0+1	0
20	MF	(France) FRA	Kévin Malcuit	4	0	1+1	0	1	0	1	0
21	FW	(Romania) ROU	Daniel Niculae	1	0	0	0	0	0	0+1	0
31	MF	(France) FRA	Kévin Diaz	1	0	0+1	0	0	0	0	0

=== Top scorers ===
Place	Position	Nation	Number	Name	Ligue 2	Coupe de France	Coupe de la Ligue	Total
1	FW	(Senegal)	11	Ibrahima Touré	10	0	0	10
1	FW	(France)	18	Valère Germain	8	2	0	10
3	MF	(Cameroon)	28	Edgar Salli	5	2	0	7
4	MF	(France)	8	Ludovic Giuly	3	2	0	5
5	FW	(French Polynesia)	9	Marama Vahirua	2	1	0	3
5	MF	(Morocco)	32	Nabil Dirar	3	0	0	3
7	MF	(France)	25	Valentin Eysseric	1	1	0	2
7	DF	(Brazil)	12	Adriano	0	1	1	2
7	DF	(France)	29	Tristan Dingomé	1	1	0	2
10	MF	(Republic of the Congo)	7	Chris Malonga	1	0	0	1
10	FW	(France)	11	Frédéric Nimani	1	0	0	1
10	MF	(France)	5	Gary Coulibaly	1	0	0	1
10	MF	(France)	4	Rabiu Afolabi	1	0	0	1
10	MF	(France)	15	Thomas Mangani	1	0	0	1
10	FW	(Mali)	10	Sambou Yatabaré	1	0	0	1
10	DF	(Greece)	36	Giorgios Tzavelas	1	0	0	1
				TOTALS	41	10	1	52

=== Disciplinary record ===
Number	Nation	Position	Name	Ligue 2		Coupe de France		Coupe de la Ligue		Total	
Number	Nation	Position	Name	Yellow card	Red card	Yellow card	Red card	Yellow card	Red card	Yellow card	Red card
2	(Nigeria)	DF	Dennis Appiah	1	0	0	0	0	0	1	0
3	(France)	DF	Vincent Muratori	3	1	1	0	0	0	4	1
4	(Nigeria)	DF	Rabiu Afolabi	1	0	0	0	0	0	1	0
5	(France)	DF	Gary Coulibaly	4	1	1	0	0	0	5	1
6	(France)	MF	Stéphane Dumont	1	0	0	0	0	0	1	0
8	(France)	MF	Ludovic Giuly	2	0	0	0	0	0	2	0
10	(Mali)	MF	Sambou Yatabaré	2	0	1	0	0	0	3	0
11	(France)	FW	Frédéric Nimani	1	0	0	0	0	0	1	0
11	(Senegal)	FW	Ibrahima Touré	5	0	0	0	0	0	5	0
12	(Brazil)	DF	Adriano	3	1	0	0	0	0	3	1
13	(Sweden)	DF	Petter Hansson	1	1	0	0	0	0	1	1
14	(France)	DF	Florian Pinteaux	1	0	0	0	0	0	1	0
15	(France)	MF	Thomas Mangani	1	0	0	0	0	0	1	0
17	(France)	FW	Terence Makengo	1	0	0	0	0	0	1	0
18	(France)	FW	Valère Germain	4	0	0	0	0	0	4	0
19	(Ivory Coast)	DF	Isaac Koné	2	1	0	0	0	0	2	1
21	(Uruguay)	DF	Gary Kagelmacher	3	0	0	0	0	0	3	0
20	(Hungary)	MF	Vladimir Koman	1	0	0	0	0	0	1	0
24	(France)	MF	Nampalys Mendy	1	1	0	0	0	0	1	1
25	(France)	MF	Valentin Eysseric	4	0	1	0	0	0	5	0
26	(France)	DF	Eric Marester	8	0	0	0	0	0	8	0
27	(Mali)	MF	Aadil Assana	2	0	1	0	0	0	3	0
28	(Cameroon)	MF	Edgar Salli	2	0	0	0	0	0	2	0
29	(France)	DF	Tristan Dingomé	3	0	0	0	0	0	3	0
30	(France)	GK	Johann Carrasso	1	1	0	0	0	0	1	1
31	(Germany)	DF	Andreas Wolf	1	0	0	0	0	0	1	0
32	(Morocco)	MF	Nabil Dirar	2	0	0	0	0	0	2	0
33	(France)	DF	Florian Pinteaux	3	0	1	0	0	0	4	0
36	(Greece)	DF	Giorgios Tzavelas	3	1	0	0	0	0	3	1
40	(Croatia)	GK	Danijel Subašić	1	0	0	0	0	0	1	0
--	(France)	DF	Jérémy Labor	1	0	0	0	0	0	1	0
			TOTALS	64	7	6	0	0	0	70	7
