= Nabil Dirar =

Moroccan footballer (born 1986)

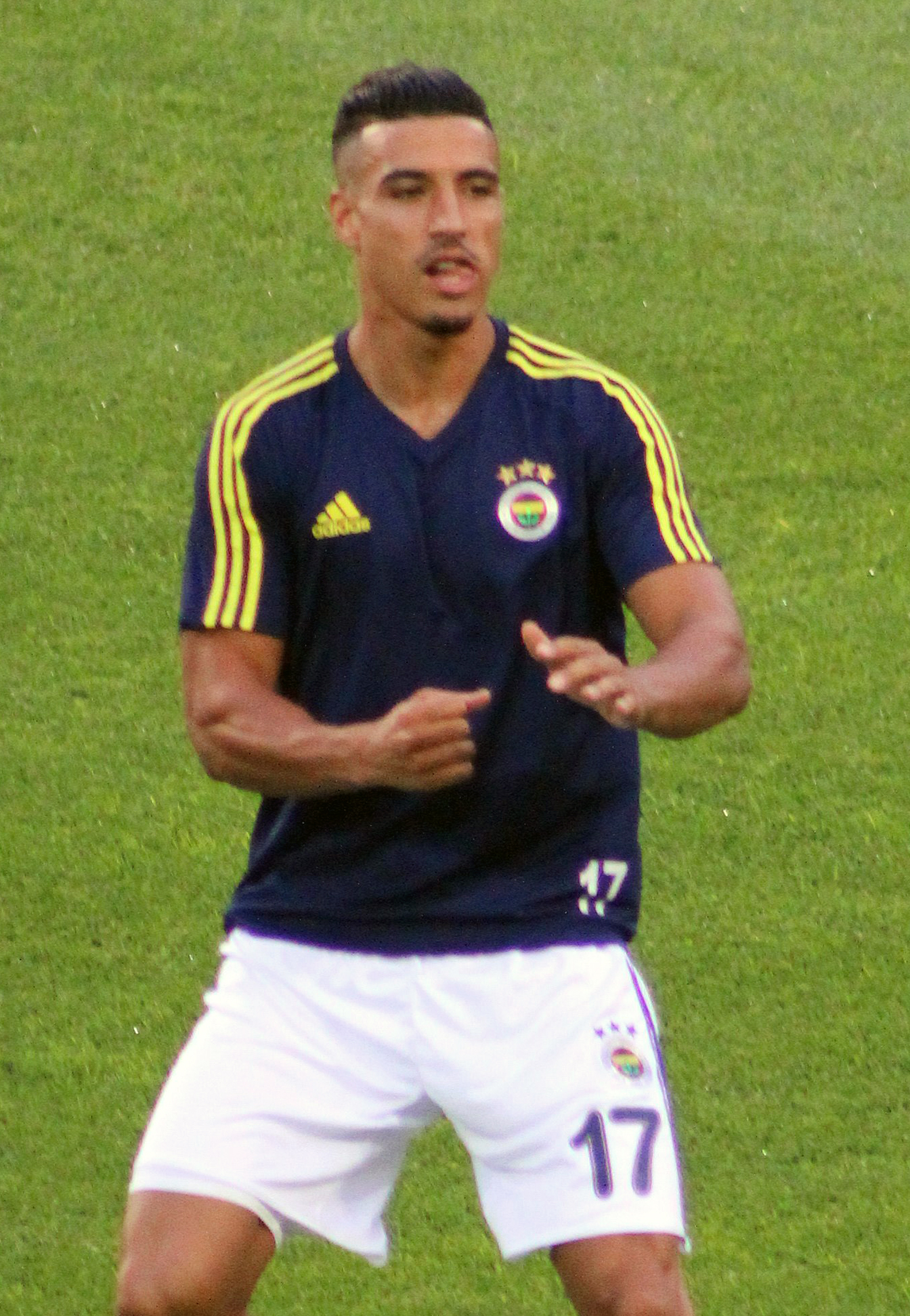

Personal information
- Full name: Nabil Dirar
- Date of birth: 25 February 1986 (age 40)
- Place of birth: Casablanca, Morocco
- Height: 1.87 m (6 ft 2 in)
- Position: Winger

Team information
- Current team: Santa Lucia
- Number: 14

Senior career*
Years	Team	Apps	(Gls)
2004–2006	Diegem Sport	26	(2)
2006–2008	Westerlo	57	(3)
2008–2012	Club Brugge	114	(11)
2012–2017	Monaco	125	(12)
2017–2021	Fenerbahçe	73	(7)
2021	→ Club Brugge (loan)	2	(0)
2021–2022	Kasımpaşa	6	(0)
2022–2023	Chabab Mohammédia	1	(0)
2023	Ishøj IF	0	(0)
2024	FC Schifflange 95	15	(0)
2024–2025	Gostivar	19	(0)
2026–	Santa Lucia	0	(0)

International career
	Morocco U23	2	(1)
2008–2019	Morocco	46	(3)
- * Club domestic league appearances and goals as of 24 June 2025

Nabil Dirar (Arabic: نَبِيل دِرَار; born 25 February 1986) is a Moroccan professional footballer who plays as a winger for Maltese club Santa Lucia.

== Club career ==
=== Early career ===
Born in Casablanca, Dirar moved to Belgium in his early teens and began his career at RWD Molenbeek and Saint-Gilloise before moving to Diegem Sport in 2004, where he began his professional career. During his two-year stay, he scored 2 goals in 26 appearances.

Dirar's performances drew the attention of many clubs, including Westerlo, which won the race against other clubs to sign him, contracting him for three years effective 1 July 2006.

=== Westerlo ===
==== 2006–07 season ====
Dirar made his Westerlo debut in the opening match of the 2006–07 season, appearing as a late substitute for Patrick Ogunsoto in a 2–1 loss against Roeselare. He scored his first Westerlo goal on 21 October in the sixth round of the Belgium Cup, a 1–0 win over Zaventem. He provided two assists in a 2–1 win over Mons on 10 February 2007, and did so again in a 4–2 win over Zulte Waregem on 21 April. In the last match of the season, Dirar scored his first Westerlo goal in the Belgian First Division, in a 1–1 draw against Gent. He finished the 2006–07 season with 2 goals from 35 appearances in all competitions.

==== 2007–08 season ====
The 2007–08 season saw Dirar score his first goal of the season on 24 September 2007, in a 2–1 loss against Standard Liège. He then set up two goals to help the club defeat Roseselare 6–0 on 20 October. On 19 January 2008, he scored one goal and assisted two others in a 7–2 win against RWDM Brussels. However, as the 2007–08 season progressed, he suffered injuries, restricting him to 25 appearances across all competitions.

Dirar's performances at Westerlo attracted interests from other clubs, including Ajax, Anderlecht, Club Brugge and Standard Liège. Ultimately, he ended up joining Club Brugge, signing a five-year contract on 21 May 2008.

=== Club Brugge ===
==== 2008–09 season ====
The next day after signing for Club Brugge, Dirar joined the squad, alongside Joseph Akpala and Ronald Vargas. He made his Club Brugge debut in the opening match of the 2008–09 season, where he started and lasted the entire 90 minutes in a 4–1 win against Tubize. After making his UEFA Cup debut against Swiss side Young Boys on 18 September 2008, He scored his first Club Brugge goal in the Bruges derby, a 3–1 win against Cercle Brugge on 19 October.

After making his debut, Dirar became a first-team regular under the management of Jacky Mathijssen, then made three assists, which he did twice against Zulte Waregem and once against Kortrijk between 29 October 2008 and 1 November 2008, both of which were wins.

Dirar scored his second goal of the season on 31 January 2009 in a 3–1 win over Tubize and again set up three assists, which he did twice against Roeselare and Cercle Brugge between 28 February 2009 and 8 March 2009 respectively, which were also both wins. During the last match of the season, he scored and set up two goals in a 4–1 win over Royal Excel Mouscron. In his first season at the club, he helped the club finish third place behind Anderlecht and Standard Liège, therefore qualifying for the following season's UEFA Europa League, and made 40 appearances, scoring 3 goals and assisting 11 times in all competitions.

==== 2009–10 season ====
Ahead of the 2009–10 season, Dirar was linked with a move to the English Premier League, with Tottenham Hotspur and Everton expressing an interest in signing him. Dirar, however, stayed at the club, while changes had been made, with manager Mathijssen replaced by Adrie Koster and Dirar being forced to compete with new signing Ivan Perišić in the starting lineup. Despite this, Dirar scored and set up a goal in the opening match of the season, a 2–1 win over Charleroi. In a 3–2 win against KV Mechelen on 15 August 2009, he spat at opposition player Yoni Buyens, which although went undetected by the referee, was caught on television. Consequently, he served a five-match ban, three on immediate effect and two on the last match of the season. However, after an appeal from the club, his ban was reduced to two matches. Around the same time, Dirar was suspended by the club and was sent to the reserve team after being late for training.

Dirar made his return to the first team on 1 October in a 2–2 draw with Toulouse in the UEFA Europa League. After again being late for training in mid-November, he was dropped from the squad against Charleroi and, as punishment, trained alone. On 30 December, he returned to the first team and scored his second goal of the season (also setting-up another) in a 4–1 win over Kortrijk. In early February, Dirar suffered an injury that kept him out throughout February and early March. He was involved in altercation with the club captain Stijn Stijnen in training.

Dirar returned to the first team on 21 March 2010, where he set up two goals in a 4–1 win over Beerschot. Weeks later, he scored two goals in two matches against Anderlecht and Gent on 3 and 11 April respectively. He finished the 2009–10 season with 4 goals and 11 assists in 42 appearances across all competitions.

==== 2010–11 season ====
Ahead of the 2010–11 season Dirar signed a new contract with Club Brugge lasting until 2014. However, he was again sent to the reserve team for two weeks after he failed to attend the fan day, though he claimed he did not attend because he was ill. After two weeks with the reserves, he was reinstated to the first team. Following a 1–0 loss against Lokeren on 23 October 2010, Dirar was again sent to the reserve side for three weeks after he fouled Tiko, which could have earned him a red card; he was substituted off in the second half as a result.

After a three-week absence, he was reinstated to the first team and scored his first goal of the season on 28 November in a 2–1 win over Sint-Truidense. He scored his second goal in a 4–3 win over Westerlo in the next match. In the match against Gent on 26 December, Dirar set up one of the goals but was sent-off in the eventual 2–0 win. After the match, he was suspended for two matches. Ultimately serving only a one-match ban, he returned to the first team and scored and assisted another goal in a 5–0 win over Charleroi on 29 December.

During a 2–1 victory against Lokeren on 21 February 2011, Dirar was involved an incident with teammate Ivan Perišić over who should take a free-kick; Perišić took the kick and scored, though Dirar refused to celebrate. He was sent to the reserve team for the third time that season after a 4–1 win over Kortrijk on 12 March when he again was involved in an incident with a teammate over who should take a free-kick, this time with Vadis Odjidja-Ofoe. After the incident, Club Brugge supporters booed him, leading him to respond to the supporters with an obscene gestures. He was ordered by manager Koster to leave the pitch to avoid aggravating the situation. After the match, Dirar apologized to the club and Odjidja-Ofoe during a press conference, saying his behaviour was unacceptable.

A few weeks later, before the start of the playoffs, manager Koster reinstated Dirar to the first team, and he went on to appear in all of Brugge's playoff matches. He finished the 2010–11 season with 3 goals and 11 assists in 40 appearances in all competitions. At the end of the season, he signed a contract with the club, which would keep him until 2016.

==== 2011–12 season ====
In the 2011–12 season, Dirar became one of the most productive players at the club, tallying the most assists for Club Brugge that season (11). He started the season well when he scored his first European goal in the first leg of the UEFA Europa League qualifying phase, in a 4–1 win over Qarabağ, and went on to progress to the next round despite losing 1–0 in the return leg. Dirar scored again in the Europa League group stage and set-up another in a 2–0 win over Maribor. He followed this by scoring his first league goal of the season, in a 2–1 win over Lokeren on 18 September 2011, as well as setting-up another goal. Between 26 October and 30 November, he scored seven goals in six appearances in all competitions, against Gent, Genk, Standard Liège, Cercle Brugge and scoring a brace against Maribor in the Europa League.

In the January transfer window, Dirar was linked with a move away from Club Brugge. French side Monaco made a bid for him, which led to him not playing against RAEC Mons on 29 January 2012 due to a hip injury.

=== Monaco ===
==== 2012–13 season ====
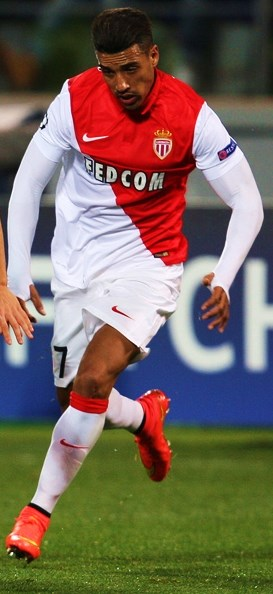
Dirar playing for Monaco in 2015.

On 31 January 2012, Dirar joined Ligue 2 side Monaco for a €7.5 million transfer fee, the highest transfer fee ever received by Club Brugge. Upon joining Monaco, he stated leaving Club Brugge for Monaco was an offer he could not turn down, though he made an apology to manager Christoph Daum.

Dirar made his Monaco debut on 13 February 2012, coming on as a substitute in a 1–0 loss against Bastia. Nine days later, on 24 February, he scored his first goal for the team in a 2–1 win over Stade Lavallois. He then scored two more goals in the 2011–12 season, against Châteauroux and Istres. Dirar finished the half of the 2011–12 season scoring 3 goals from 15 appearances in all competitions.

In the 2012–13 season, Dirar started the season well for the club, setting-up a goal in a 4–0 win over Tours in the opening match of the domestic season. On 25 February 2013 he scored his first goal of the season, in a 1–0 win over Lens. After missing two matches, he scored on his return on 15 March in a 2–2 draw against Angers. On 22 April, he contributed a goal and an assist in a 4–0 win over Clermont. After a two-year absence from top-flight football, Dirar helped the club reach promotion to Ligue 1. On 24 May 2013, in the final match of the 2012–13 season during a match against Tours, he ruptured his cruciate ligaments. Following the match, it was announced he would be out for six months with cruciate ligaments injury. He finished the 2012–13 season with 3 goals from 37 appearances in all competitions.

==== 2013–14 season ====
The 2013–14 season saw Dirar continue rehabilitating his injury, and after seven months on the sidelines, he made his return to training from injury in January 2014. It was not until 1 February 2014 when he made his return from the first team, where he came on as a substitute for James Rodríguez in the 62nd minute in a 2–2 draw against Lorient. Dirar then scored his first goal of the season on 10 May in a 2–1 win over Valenciennes. He finished the 2013–14 season with 1 goal in 13 appearances across all competitions.

==== 2014–15 season ====
In the 2014–15 season, Dirar started the opening match of the Ligue 1 season at right-back in a 2–1 loss to Lorient. It came after when new manager Leonardo Jardim began slotting Dirar at right-back position during the pre-season. After missing one match due to an ankle injury, Dirar scored his first goal for the club on 21 September in a 1–0 win over Guingamp. After suffering two separate injuries in November he set up a goal for Lucas Ocampos to score the only goal in a UEFA Champions League match against Bayer Leverkusen, a 1–0 victory on 26 November.

Following a shinbone injury at the start of 2015 Dirar made his first team return on 17 January 2015, coming on as a substitute in the second half in a 1–0 win over Nantes. He then captained Monaco for the first time following absence of the team captain Jérémy Toulalan in the Champions League knockout stage in the first leg, a 3–1 win over Arsenal. One month later, on 22 March, he scored his second goal of the season in a 3–1 win over Stade de Reims. As the 2014–15 season progressed, Dirar suffered an injury and was sent-off in a 4–1 win over Toulouse on 3 May 2015. He finished the 2014–15 season with 2 goals from 41 appearances in all competitions.

==== 2015–16 season ====
In the 2015–16 season, Dirar started in all seven matches, both in the Pro League and UEFA Europa League qualifying stages. However, in late August, he suffered ankle injury which kept him sidelined for several weeks. After four weeks out with an injury, he made his return to the first team on 24 September 2015, where he set up one of his side's goals in a 3–2 win over Montpellier, followed up by scoring his first goal of the season in a 3–3 draw against Guingamp. However, he continued to remain sidelined, including suffering another ankle injury.

Dirar made his first team return on 5 December, where he set-up one goal in a 2–1 win over Bastia. After suffering from another injury, his return was short-lived when he received a straight red card for leaning his head in towards referee Tony Chapron in the second half in a 1–0 win over Nice on 6 February 2016. Initially given a three-match ban, it was later extended to eight matches on 4 March.

After serving the ban, Dirar made his return to the first team on 10 April in a 4–1 loss against Lille. He scored his second goal of the season in a 3–2 win over Guingamp on 30 April. He went on to finish the 2015–16 season with 2 goals from 24 appearances in all competitions.

==== 2016–17 season ====
In the 2016–17 season, Dirar started the season well providing two assists to help the club defeat Fenerbahçe to send them through to the next round of the UEFA Champions League qualifying rounds. In the next match, against Guingamp in the 2016–17 Ligue 1 opener, he was awarded the captaincy following the absence of incumbent Radamel Falcao; he recorded an assist in the 2–2 draw. He went on to captain two more matches, including against Villarreal, which ensured progression to the group stage after defeating the Spaniards 3–1 on aggregate. He suffered a calf injury during a Champions League match against Tottenham Hotspur, which kept him sidelined for six weeks.

On 26 November 2016 Dirar made his return to the first team, coming on as a second-half substitute in a 4–0 win over Marseille. Two weeks after returning to the first team, he captained the side again on matchday 6 of the Champions League, a 3–0 loss against Bayer Leverkusen. He also captained the team in the following match, a 7–0 win over Rennes in the round of 16 of the Coupe de la Ligue seven days later. After being sidelined on three occasions due to international commitment and injuries Dirar scored an equalizer following a free-kick from Radamel Falcao in a 2–1 win over Dijon on 15 April 2017. He suffered an injury during a warm-up prior to a Champions League match against Juventus, keeping him out for the remainder of the season. The club went on to win the league for the first time since 2000 and Dirar was among three players (including with Danijel Subašić and Andrea Raggi) who won both Ligue 1 and Ligue 2 in the past four seasons. In 2016–17, he scored 1 goal from 33 appearances across all competitions.

=== Fenerbahçe ===
In May 2017, Dirar expressed desire to leave Monaco to seek new adventure. It was announced on 16 June 2017 that Dirar moved to Turkish Süper Lig club Fenerbahçe for a €4.5 million transfer fee; he signed a three-year contract with an option for an additional year.

In January 2021, Dirar rejoined Belgian side Club Brugge until the end of the 2021–22 season.

=== Late career ===
On 3 September 2021, Dirar joined Kasimpașa as a free agent, on a one-year contract.

On 9 September 2022, Dirar signed on a free transfer with Moroccan club Chabab Mohammédia, on a 1-year contract.

After playing his last game with Mohammédia in November 2022, Dirar signed on a free transfer with Danish Third Division club Ishøj IF until the summer of 2024. 2 months later he quit the club again and retired from football due to persistent calf injuries. However, Dirar was presented in Luxembourg's FC Schifflange 95 half a year later.

== International career ==
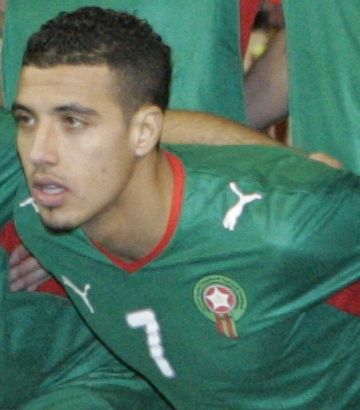
Dirar in the Moroccan squad before a friendly match against Czech Republic on 11 February 2009.

Dirar holds both Belgian and Moroccan nationalities, making him eligible to play for either national team. After featuring for the Morocco U23, he hinted at playing for the Belgium after being left out of the Morocco squad for the Africa Cup of Nations.

Dirar initially announced his intention to play for the Belgium national football team after he decided to decline Morocco's offer. However, he was ineligible to play for Belgium due to his appearances for the Moroccan youth squad. Eventually, two months later, he announced his intention to play for Morocco. Previously, he had said that he considered himself more Moroccan than Belgian.

After appearing in the Morocco U23 side, Dirar earned his first cap for the Morocco in the 2010 FIFA World Cup qualification match against Mauritania on 11 October 2008. His international career was in doubt after being left out of the squad. He later revealed that he did not get on with then Morocco Manager Roger Lemerre, saying Lemerre treated him like a dog. Following Lemerre's sacking, Dirar was welcomed back to the national team. In February 2012, he was called up by Manager Eric Gerets for the Africa Cup of Nations but declined the offer, believing that Gerets would not be needing him for the national team squad.

However, after a six-year absence, Dirar made his national team return, where he played as a right–back, in a 1–0 loss against Uruguay on 28 March 2015. It was his first appearance since being suspended.

In May 2018 he was named in Morocco's 23-man squad for the 2018 FIFA World Cup in Russia.

== Personal life ==
Born in Casablanca, Morocco, Dirar grew up in a poor childhood: his father died when he was one, leaving his mother, a housekeeper, raising eleven children: seven sons and four daughters. Due to his mother's struggle, his brothers worked to support his mother.

Dirar expressed his past dislike for school, having revealed that he skipped school and exams. Despite this, Dirar took auto mechanic's classes for two years. Dirar is also good friends with compatriot teammate Mbark Boussoufa. In September 2012, Dirar was fined and lost his driver's license for about fifteen days after he parked his car in the bike path prior to his departure to AS Monaco.

Dirar married in 2011. In 2012, Dirar became a father when his wife gave birth to a daughter, Layana, which led him to cancel his international commitment to Morocco.

He is a Muslim.

== Career statistics ==
=== Club ===
As of match played on 3 August 2023.

Appearances and goals by club, season and competition
Club	Season	League			National cup		League Cup		Continental		Total	
Club	Season	Division	Apps	Goals	Apps	Goals	Apps	Goals	Apps	Goals	Apps	Goals
Club Brugge	2008–09	Belgian Pro League	33	3	0	0	—		6	0	39	3
Club Brugge	2009–10	Belgian Pro League	29	4	4	0	—		9	0	42	4
Club Brugge	2010–11	Belgian Pro League	33	3	0	0	—		7	0	40	3
Club Brugge	2011–12	Belgian Pro League	22	4	1	1	—		8	4	31	9
Club Brugge	Total		117	14	5	1	—		30	4	152	19
Monaco	2011–12	French Ligue 2	15	3	0	0	0	0	—		15	3
Monaco	2012–13	French Ligue 2	34	3	0	0	3	0	—		37	3
Monaco	2013–14	French Ligue 1	11	1	2	0	0	0	0	0	13	1
Monaco	2014–15	French Ligue 1	27	2	3	0	2	0	9	0	41	2
Monaco	2015–16	French Ligue 1	20	2	1	0	0	0	7	0	28	2
Monaco	2016–17	French Ligue 1	18	1	2	0	2	0	11	0	33	1
Monaco	Total		125	12	7	0	7	0	27	0	167	12
Fenerbahçe	2017–18	Turkish Süper Lig	29	4	4	0	—		4	1	37	5
Fenerbahçe	2018–19	Turkish Süper Lig	16	1	2	0	—		1	0	19	1
Fenerbahçe	2019–20	Turkish Süper Lig	28	2	5	0	—		0	0	33	2
Fenerbahçe	Total		73	7	11	0	—		5	1	89	8
Club Brugge (loan)	2020–21	Belgian Pro League	25	0	1	0	—		2	0	28	0
Kasimpașa	2021–22	Turkish Süper Lig	6	0	0	0	—		0	0	6	0
Chabab Mohammédia	2022–23	Moroccan Botola Pro	2	0	0	0	—		0	0	2	0
Career total			348	33	24	1	7	0	64	5	443	39

=== International ===
As of match played 19 November 2019

Morocco
Year	Apps	Goals
2008	2	0
2009	4	0
2010	0	0
2011	1	0
2012	0	0
2013	0	0
2014	4	0
2015	3	1
2016	6	1
2017	13	1
2018	6	0
2019	9	0
Total	48	3

=== International goals ===
Scores and results list Morocco's goal tally first.

Goal	Date	Venue	Opponent	Score	Result	Competition
1.	5 September 2015	Estádio Nacional 12 de Julho, São Tomé, São Tomé and Príncipe	São Tomé and Príncipe	3–0	3–0	2017 Africa Cup of Nations qualification
2.	3 June 2016	Stade Olympique de Radès, Tunis, Tunisia	Libya	1–0	1–1	2017 Africa Cup of Nations qualification
3.	11 November 2017	Stade Félix Houphouët-Boigny, Abidjan, Ivory Coast	Ivory Coast	1–0	2–0	2018 FIFA World Cup qualification

== Honours ==
Monaco

- Ligue 1: 2016–17
- Ligue 2: 2012–13

Club Brugge

- Belgian First Division A: 2020–21
