= Valère Germain =

French footballer (born 1990)

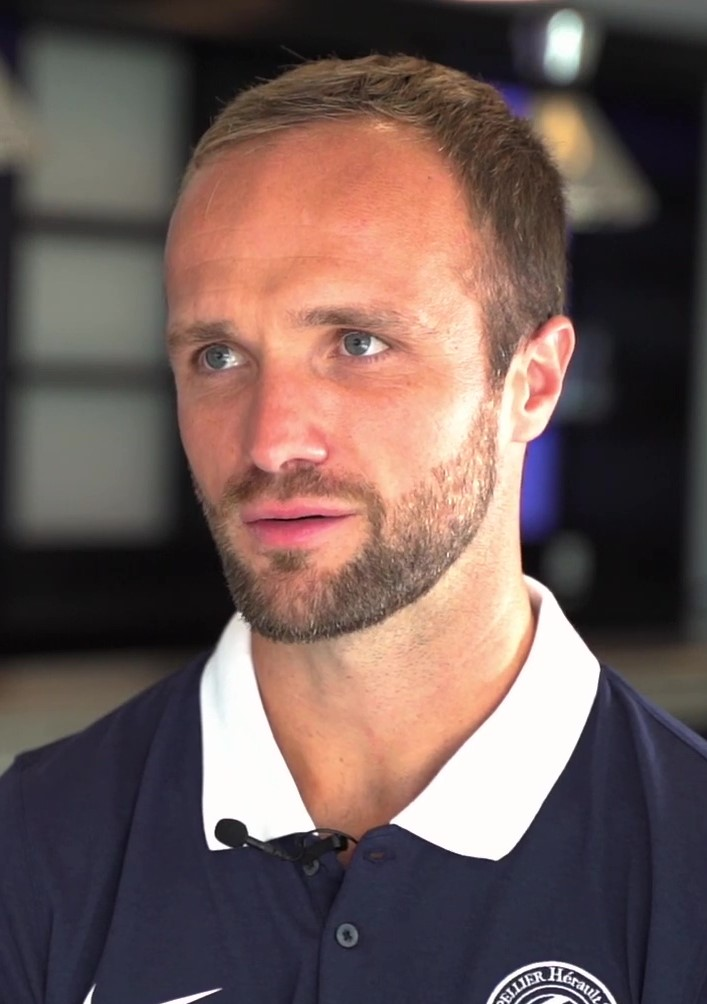
- Germain in 2021

Personal information
- Full name: Valère Bruno René Germain
- Date of birth: 17 April 1990 (age 36)
- Place of birth: Marseille, France
- Height: 1.81 m (5 ft 11 in)
- Position: Forward

Youth career
- 1996–2002: ASPTT Orléans
- 2002–2004: Orléans
- 2004–2005: Châteauroux
- 2005–2010: Monaco

Senior career*
Years	Team	Apps	(Gls)
2010–2012	Monaco II	31	(14)
2010–2017	Monaco	159	(41)
2015–2016	→ Nice (loan)	38	(14)
2017–2021	Marseille	120	(22)
2021–2023	Montpellier	65	(6)
2023–2025	Macarthur FC	45	(19)
2025–2026	Sanfrecce Hiroshima	22	(2)

International career
2012	France U20	4	(2)
2011	France U21	4	(0)
- * Club domestic league appearances and goals as of 29 October 2025

Valère Bruno René Germain (born 17 April 1990) is a French former professional footballer who played as a forward.

== Early life ==
Valère Bruno René Germain was born on 17 April 1990 in Marseille, Bouches-du-Rhône. Germain is the son of former footballer Bruno Germain.

== Club career ==
=== Monaco ===
In the 2009 off-season, Germain signed his first professional contract agreeing to a three-year deal. He had previously played in the Monaco Championnat de France Amateur (CFA) team that won the reserve team title in the 2008–09 season. Despite signing professional terms, the striker spent the next two seasons playing in the club's reserve team. Germain made his professional debut on 1 May 2011 in a league match against Saint-Étienne appearing as a substitute. He played in the team's final league match of the season against Lyon appearing as a substitute in a 2–0 defeat. The defeat confirmed Monaco's relegation to Ligue 2.

In the second division, Germain was permanently promoted to the senior team and, on 15 August 2011, he scored his first goal for the club in a 2–1 loss against Reims. In the following month, he scored his second career goal in a 2–2 draw against Sedan. In the 2012–13 campaign, Germain scored 14 goals in 35 matches for AS Monaco as they got promoted to Ligue 1. On 23 July 2013, Germain signed a contract extension with Monaco, keeping him at the club until 2017. Germain was part of the AS Monaco side that won the 2016–2017 Ligue 1 title, contributing with 10 goals.

In July 2015, Germain joined Nice on loan from Monaco. Nice had an option to buy him after the end of the loan spell.

=== Marseille ===
On 25 June 2017, Monaco announced that Germain had joined Marseille. He scored his first goal on 28 July in the Europa League third qualifying round against Oostende in his debut match for Marseille (4–2).

On 3 May 2018, he played in the Europa League semi-finals away to Red Bull Salzburg – Salzburg won the game 2–1 but Marseille progressed to the final with a 3–2 aggregate victory. Germain missed a big chance early in the final as Atletico Madrid won 3–0 at the Groupama Stadium, in Lyon.

=== Montpellier ===
Following his departure from Marseille in the summer of 2021, Germain remained on the south coast of France, signing for fellow Ligue 1 side Montpellier.

=== Macarthur FC ===
After his 2 year contract with Montpellier expired, Germain moved to Australia to sign for Sydney based A-League club Macarthur FC, signing a two-year deal.

He made his debut for the club, starting in a forward position, against Shan United in the AFC Cup and scored his first goal, as well as setting up the third goal of the game, in a 3–0 win. Two weeks later on 5 October 2023, he scored a brace in another AFC Cup match against Cebu, as well as, setting up one of the goals, in a 8–2 win. Germain captained his first match as a Macarthur FC player against Central Coast Mariners on 29 October 2023, with captain Ulises Dávila placed on the bench and scored the opener, in a 2–1 win. After the match, manager Mile Sterjovski praised his performance and hope that he continued to score more goals. His impact at Macarthur FC was noticed by the Australian newspaper The Daily Telegraph. Germain spoke out about settling in Australia with his wife and son. He then scored his first hat-trick in Australia, in a 4–3 win against Western Sydney Wanderers on 4 February 2024.

On 6 April 2024, Germain scored the first ever A-League Men goal at the Wyndham Regional Football Facility, scoring a 17th minute penalty in an eventual 4–2 loss to Western United.

On 11 February 2025, Germain was issued a 'Disciplinary Notice' after being cited by Football Australia's Match Review Panel for an incident of referee abuse. The following day, it was announced that Germain had received a two match suspension for his actions. Having initially declared his intention to appeal the suspension, Germain instead decided to request a release from his contract with Macarthur FC, citing "refereeing standards" in Australia as his reason for wanting to leave and take up a contract offer with a club in Japan.

=== Sanfrecce Hiroshima ===
On 27 February 2025, Germain signed a contract with Japanese club Sanfrecce Hiroshima.

He scored on his club debut in the first leg of the AFC Champions League's quarter-finals, in a 6-1 win against Lion City Sailors. However, it was emerged that Germain played the match while serving a suspension in the tournament and this led Sanfrecce Hiroshima's win being forfeited and awarded 3–0 to Lion City Sailors by the AFC Disciplinary Committee on 8 March 2025. In the return leg, the club was eliminated from the tournament following a 1-1 draw.

In January 2026, Germain retired from football.

== International career ==
Germain was a France youth international having earned caps at under-21 level. He made his under-21 debut on 2 June 2011 appearing as a substitute in a 1–0 win against Serbia.

== Career statistics ==
As of match played 9 February 2025

Appearances and goals by club, season and competition
Club	Season	League			National cup (Note: Includes Coupe de France, Australia Cup, Emperor's Cup)		League cup (Note: Includes Coupe de la Ligue)		Continental		Other		Total	
Club	Season	Division	Apps	Goals	Apps	Goals	Apps	Goals	Apps	Goals	Apps	Goals	Apps	Goals
Monaco	2010–11	Ligue 1	2	0	0	0	0	0	—		—		2	0
Monaco	2011–12	Ligue 2	34	8	3	2	1	0	—		—		38	10
Monaco	2012–13	Ligue 2	35	14	2	2	2	0	—		—		39	16
Monaco	2013–14	Ligue 1	23	5	2	0	1	0	—		—		26	5
Monaco	2014–15	Ligue 1	29	4	2	1	3	0	3	0	—		37	5
Monaco	2016–17	Ligue 1	36	10	5	3	3	0	16 (Note: Appearances in UEFA Champions League)	4	—		60	17
Monaco	Total		159	41	14	8	10	0	19	4	—		202	53
Nice (loan)	2015–16	Ligue 1	38	14	2	0	1	0	—		—		41	14
Marseille	2017–18	Ligue 1	35	9	2	1	1	1	17 (Note: Appearances in UEFA Europa League)	7	—		55	18
Marseille	2018–19	Ligue 1	36	8	1	0	1	0	4	0	—		42	8
Marseille	2019–20	Ligue 1	25	2	4	0	1	0	—		—		30	2
Marseille	2020–21	Ligue 1	24	3	2	0	—		5	0	1 (Note: Appearance in Trophée des Champions)	0	32	3
Marseille	Total		120	22	11	1	3	1	26	7	1	0	158	31
Montpellier	2021–22	Ligue 1	34	4	2	0	—		—		—		36	4
Montpellier	2022–23	Ligue 1	31	2	1	1	—		—		—		32	3
Montpellier	Total		65	6	3	1	—		—		—		68	7
Macarthur FC	2023–24	A-League Men	28	12	1	0	—		7 (Note: Appearances in AFC Champions League Two)	4	—		36	16
Macarthur FC	2024–25	A-League Men	17	7	4	4	–		–		–		21	11
Macarthur FC	Total		45	19	5	4	–		7	4	–		57	27
Sanfrecce Hiroshima	2025	J1 League	0	0	0	0	–		0	0	–		0	0
Career total			427	102	31	14	16	1	50	15	1	0	525	132

== Honours ==
Monaco

- Ligue 1: 2016–17
- Ligue 2: 2012–13

Marseille

- UEFA Europa League runner-up: 2017–18

Macarthur FC

- Australia Cup: 2024

Sanfrecce Hiroshima

- J.League Cup: 2025
