= Nampalys Mendy =

Senegalese footballer (born 1992)

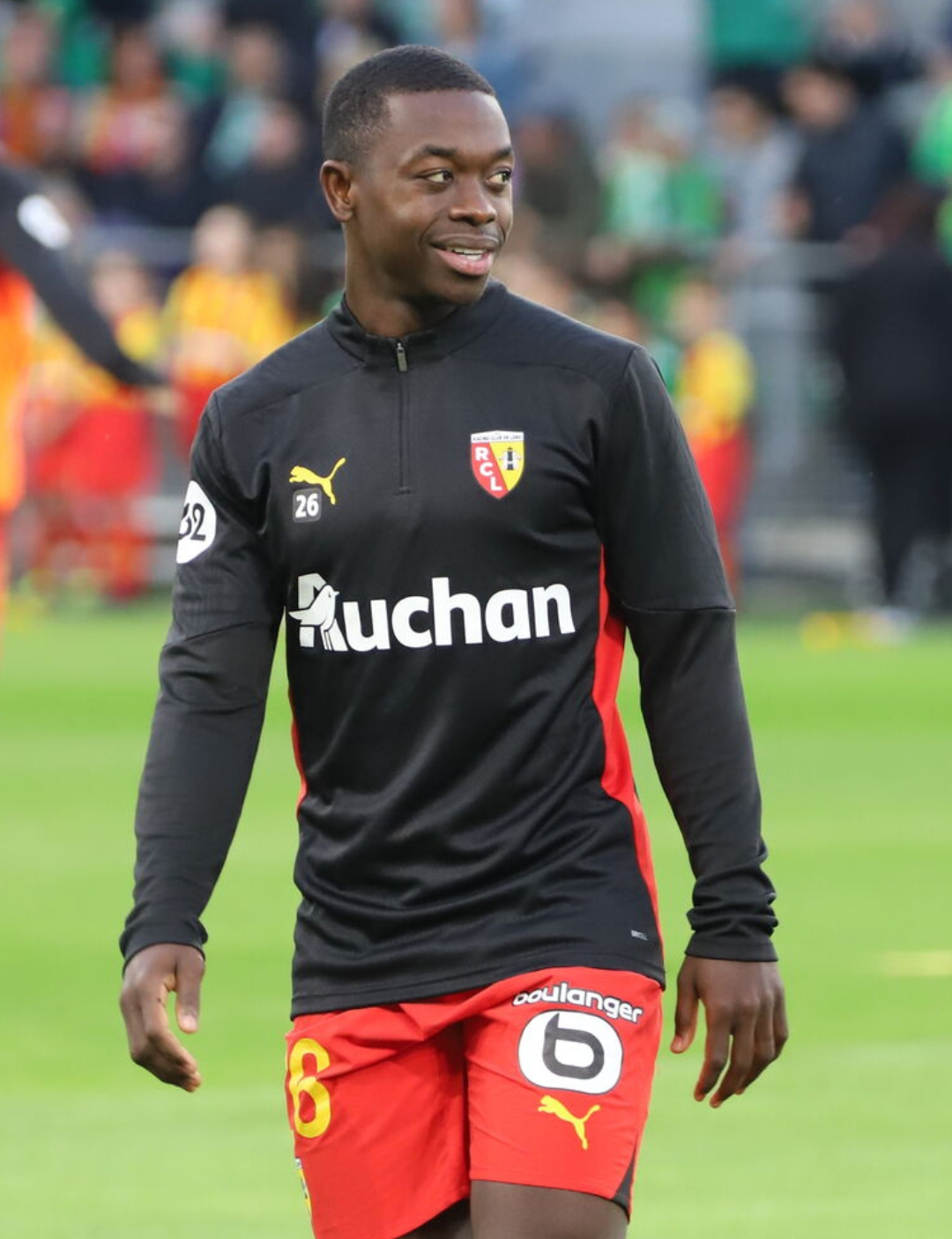
- Mendy with Lens in 2024

Personal information
- Full name: Nampalys Mendy
- Date of birth: 23 June 1992 (age 34)
- Place of birth: La Seyne-sur-Mer, France
- Height: 1.67 m (5 ft 6 in)
- Position: Defensive midfielder

Team information
- Current team: Metz
- Number: 6

Youth career
- 1998–1999: La Beaucaire Toulon
- 1999–2001: Toulon Le Las
- 2001–2005: RCF Toulon
- 2005–2007: Toulon
- 2007–2010: Monaco

Senior career*
Years	Team	Apps	(Gls)
2010–2012	Monaco B	12	(0)
2010–2013	Monaco	74	(0)
2013–2016	Nice	110	(1)
2016–2023	Leicester City	98	(1)
2017–2018	→ Nice (loan)	14	(0)
2023–2025	Lens	26	(0)
2025–2026	Watford	25	(0)
2026–	Metz	2	(0)

International career^{‡}
2009	France U18	3	(0)
2010–2011	France U19	8	(0)
2011–2013	France U20	13	(0)
2010–2014	France U21	5	(0)
2021–2025	Senegal	35	(0)
Medal record
Men's football
Representing Senegal
Africa Cup of Nations
Winner	2021 Cameroon
- * Club domestic league appearances and goals as of 14 August 2026 (UTC) ‡ National team caps and goals as of 23:19, 14 October 2025 (UTC)

Nampalys Mendy (born 23 June 1992) is a professional footballer who plays as a defensive midfielder for Ligue 2 club Metz. Born in France, he represents the Senegal national team.

Due to his small stature, simple distribution, and reliable style of play, Mendy has been compared to former French international, Claude Makélélé. Monaco club scout Didier Christophe, for example, referred to Mendy as a "carbon copy" of Makélélé. Mendy featured in Senegal's 2021 Africa Cup of Nations Final victory against Egypt.

== Club career ==
=== Early career ===
After leaving Sporting Toulon in June 2007, Mendy went on trial with the football section of RC Toulon. According to Monaco scout Didier Christophe, the Toulon coaches stated that Mendy was there to "make up the numbers". However, while observing Mendy in training, Christophe noticed the player's intelligence and understanding of the game and recommended him to Dominique Bijotat, who was serving as head of the Monaco youth academy.

=== Monaco ===
On 27 April 2010, Mendy signed his first professional contract, agreeing to a three-year deal with Monaco until June 2013. In July 2010, he was called up to the first team by manager Guy Lacombe for pre-season training, again to make up the numbers with Lacombe missing several players such as Diego Pérez, Nicolas Nkoulou, Park Chu-young, and Lukman Haruna, who had all participated in the 2010 FIFA World Cup.

On 7 August 2010, Mendy made his professional debut in the club's opening league match against Lyon. He played the entire 90 minutes, receiving a yellow card in the second half. Mendy picked up his first ever red card on 19 August 2011 against Amiens, sent off at the 70th minute mark in a 1–1 draw.

During the 2012–13 season, Mendy played a key role in Monaco's promotion back to Ligue 1. Despite the successful season, Mendy decided to leave Monaco at the end of the season after his contract expired.

=== Nice ===
Mendy was linked to teams such as Manchester United and Arsenal. Despite calling Manchester United his "dream club", Mendy rejected the move to the English side because he wanted to stay in France. After some positive talks with Nice's manager, Claude Puel, Mendy decided to join Nice on a free transfer.

Mendy made his debut on 17 August 2013, in a 2–1 win against Rennes. After club captain Didier Digard left for Real Betis on a free transfer at the end of 2014–15 season, and new captain Mathieu Bodmer was injured, Mendy was named captain.

Mendy made 110 appearances in three seasons for Nice and helped them to a fourth-place finish in Ligue 1 in 2015–16. He had the second highest number of passes behind Thiago Motta (2950), the most passes per game (78), and a passing accuracy of (92%), best of any player not a member of Paris Saint-Germain.

=== Leicester City ===
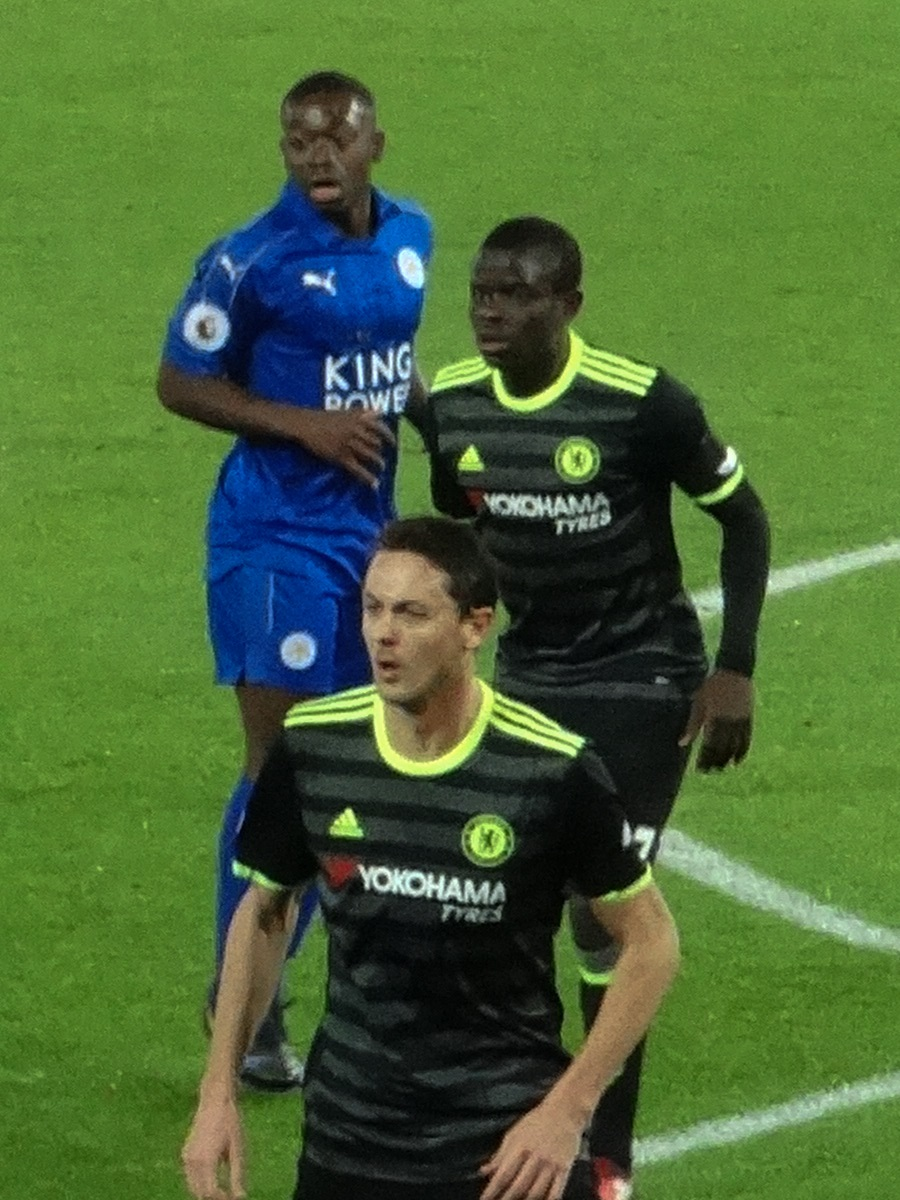
Mendy (in blue) playing for Leicester City in 2017

On 3 July 2016, Mendy moved to English Premier League champions Leicester City, managed by his former boss at Monaco, Claudio Ranieri, signing a four-year deal for £13 million, a club record at the time. The transfer record was broken again when Ahmed Musa joined Leicester for £16 million five days later, and yet again less than two months later when Islam Slimani joined Leicester for £29 million.

Mendy played his first competitive game for Leicester in a 2–1 defeat to Manchester United in the 2016 FA Community Shield on 7 August, coming on as a 63rd-minute substitute for Andy King. He suffered an ankle injury on his league debut at home against Arsenal on 20 August 2016 and was substituted in the 53rd minute. Mendy was sidelined for more than three months, and did not make his return until 7 December 2016 in a Champions League group stage match away to Porto, playing the entire game in a 5–0 defeat. He ultimately made only four league appearances for the season.

On 31 July 2017, Mendy rejoined Nice on loan.

On 24 August 2020, Mendy signed a two-year contract extension with the club.

On 10 September 2021, Mendy was left out of Leicester's final 25-man Premier League squad for the 2021–22 season. However he was then included again when the squad was updated after the January 2022 transfer window.

Mendy scored his first goal for Leicester against Tottenham on 11 February 2023.

On 5 June 2023, following the club's relegation from the Premier League, it was announced that Mendy and six other first team players would be leaving the club upon the expiration of their contracts at the end of the month.

=== Lens ===
On 4 September 2023, Mendy joined Ligue 1 club Lens on a two-year contract as a free agent.

=== Watford ===
On 28 August 2025, Mendy returned to England, joining Championship club Watford on an initial one-year deal with the option for a further year. On 22 May 2026, the club said it was releasing the player.

== International career ==
Mendy was born in France, and is Senegalese by descent. Mendy is a former French youth international having earned caps at the under-17, under-18, and under-19 levels. With the under-17 team, he went unnoticed by coach Philippe Bergeroo until the 2009 UEFA European Under-17 Championship when he was finally called up to the team. Mendy appeared in all three group stage matches as France were eliminated without winning a match. With the under-18 team, he made his debut on 29 October 2009 in a friendly match against the Denmark.

Mendy was initially called up to the under-19 team in August 2010 only to play in the Sendai Cup in Japan, but due to his consistent performances domestically, Monaco coach Guy Lacombe convinced Bergeroo to make him a permanent part of the squad. He was officially called up to the under-19 team for qualification matches for the 2011 UEFA European Under-19 Championship. Mendy made his debut with the team in a 3–0 victory over San Marino and appeared as a starter in the next two qualification matches against Montenegro and Austria, as France won both matches to finish the round undefeated.

On 9 November 2010, while still eligible to represent the under-19 and under-20 teams, Mendy was called up to the under-21 team for a friendly match against Russia.

In March 2021, Mendy received a first call-up to the Senegal national team, making his debut in a goalless draw with Congo.

Mendy was part of Senegal's squad for the 2021 Africa Cup of Nations; the Lions of Teranga went on to win the tournament for the first time in their history, with Mendy being named in CAF's Team of the Tournament.

Mendy played in all four of Senegal's matches at the 2022 FIFA World Cup as the nation reached the round of 16 for the first time since its debut in 2002.

In December 2023, he was named in Senegal's squad for the postponed 2023 Africa Cup of Nations held in the Ivory Coast.

== Personal life ==
Mendy is the cousin of fellow footballers Bafétimbi Gomis and Alexandre Mendy.

He was appointed a Grand Officer of the National Order of the Lion by President of Senegal Macky Sall following the nation's victory at the 2021 Africa Cup of Nations.

== Style of play ==
Mendy is a defensive midfielder known for his resilience, intelligence, and good distribution of the ball. Despite his age and size, Mendy has been praised for his mature and robust play, inviting comparison with former France international Claude Makélélé.

== Career statistics ==
=== Club ===
As of match played 29 July 2026

Appearances and goals by club, season and competition
Club	Season	League			National cup (Note: Includes Coupe de France, FA Cup)		League cup (Note: Includes Coupe de la Ligue, EFL Cup)		Europe		Other		Total	
Club	Season	Division	Apps	Goals	Apps	Goals	Apps	Goals	Apps	Goals	Apps	Goals	Apps	Goals
Monaco	2010–11	Ligue 1	14	0	0	0	1	0	—		—		15	0
Monaco	2011–12	Ligue 2	28	0	0	0	1	0	—		—		29	0
Monaco	2012–13	Ligue 2	32	0	0	0	4	0	—		—		36	0
Monaco	Total		74	0	0	0	6	0	0	0	—		80	0
Nice	2013–14	Ligue 1	36	0	3	0	2	0	2 (Note: Appearances in UEFA Europa League)	0	—		43	0
Nice	2014–15	Ligue 1	36	0	1	0	1	0	—		—		38	0
Nice	2015–16	Ligue 1	38	1	1	0	1	0	—		—		40	1
Nice	Total		110	1	5	0	4	0	2	0	—		121	1
Leicester City	2016–17	Premier League	4	0	3	0	0	0	1 (Note: Appearance(s) in UEFA Champions League)	0	1 (Note: Appearance in FA Community Shield)	0	9	0
Leicester City	2017–18	Premier League	0	0	0	0	1	0	—		—		1	0
Leicester City	2018–19	Premier League	31	0	0	0	1	0	—		—		32	0
Leicester City	2019–20	Premier League	7	0	1	0	0	0	—		—		8	0
Leicester City	2020–21	Premier League	23	0	2	0	0	0	4	0	—		29	0
Leicester City	2021–22	Premier League	14	0	0	0	1	0	0	0	0	0	15	0
Leicester City	2022–23	Premier League	19	1	3	0	2	0	—		—		24	1
Leicester City	Total		98	1	9	0	5	0	5	0	1	0	118	1
Nice (loan)	2017–18	Ligue 1	14	0	1	0	0	0	4	0	—		19	0
Lens	2023–24	Ligue 1	16	0	0	0	—		6	0	—		22	0
Lens	2024–25	Ligue 1	10	0	0	0	—		1 (Note: Appearance in UEFA Conference League)	0	—		11	0
Lens	Total		26	0	0	0	—		7	0	—		33	0
Watford	2025–26	Championship	25	0	1	0	0	0	—		—		26	0
Career total			347	2	16	0	15	0	18	0	1	0	397	2

=== International ===
As of match played 14 October 2025

Appearances and goals by national team and year
National team	Year	Apps	Goals
Senegal	2021	8	0
Senegal	2022	15	0
Senegal	2023	5	0
Senegal	2024	6	0
Senegal	2025	1	0
Total		35	0

== Honours ==
Monaco

- Ligue 2: 2012–13

Leicester City

- FA Cup: 2020–21

Senegal

- Africa Cup of Nations: 2021

Individual

- Africa Cup of Nations Team of the Tournament: 2021

Orders

- Grand Officer of the National Order of the Lion: 2022
