= Hrvoje Ćustić =

Croatian footballer

Personal information
- Date of birth: 21 October 1983
- Place of birth: Zadar, SR Croatia, SFR Yugoslavia
- Date of death: 3 April 2008 (aged 24)
- Place of death: Zadar, Croatia
- Height: 1.84 m (6 ft 1/2 in)
- Positions: Midfielder; forward

Senior career*
Years	Team	Apps	(Gls)
2000–2005	Zadar	84	(7)
2005–2007	NK Zagreb	22	(1)
2007–2008	Zadar	20	(1)
Total		126	(9)

International career^{‡}
2002–2003	Croatia U20	3	(0)
2004–2005	Croatia U21	7	(0)
- * Club domestic league appearances and goals as of 29 March 2008 ‡ National team caps and goals as of 29 March 2005

Hrvoje Ćustić (21 October 1983 – 3 April 2008) was a Croatian footballer who played as a midfielder.

== Career ==
Ćustić started his professional career with his youth club NK Zadar in 2000 and also spent two seasons playing for NK Zagreb between 2005 and 2007, before returning to Zadar in the summer of 2007 on a four-year contract.

== International ==
Between 2004 and 2005, he also played for the Croatian national under-21 team, winning a total of 7 international caps for the team.

== Death ==
In the opening minutes of his club's home match against HNK Cibalia in the Croatian first division on 29 March 2008, Ćustić suffered severe head injuries after colliding with a concrete wall positioned about three metres from the sideline, supporting the fence which separates the pitch from the stands. Seconds before, Ćustić tried to win a loose ball in a duel with an opposing player, but then both players collided and Ćustić was carried into the wall, hitting it with his head.

He was immediately transported to the local hospital and underwent surgery the following evening. Following the surgery, he was in an induced coma and his condition remained stable until 2 April 2008, when a believed infection caused a rapid increase in his body temperature. His condition immediately worsened and in the early afternoon of 3 April 2008, the hospital confirmed that he was brain dead at 11:51 CET that day. Following his death, all of the Croatian league fixtures scheduled for the following weekend were postponed.

== Legacy ==
Ćustić's NK Zadar teammate and former AS Monaco goalkeeper Danijel Subašić wears the image of Hrvoje under his jersey while playing. Danijel Šubašić also played his last club game with Hajduk Split in 2023,with Danijel substituted on 24'th minute, in commemoration of late Hrvoje's 24 young years.

Croatian rapper "Žuvi" mentioned Hrvoje's death in his song "HNS", where he criticized Croatian Football Association, calling out them as responsible .
