= Danijel Subašić =

Croatian footballer (born 1984)

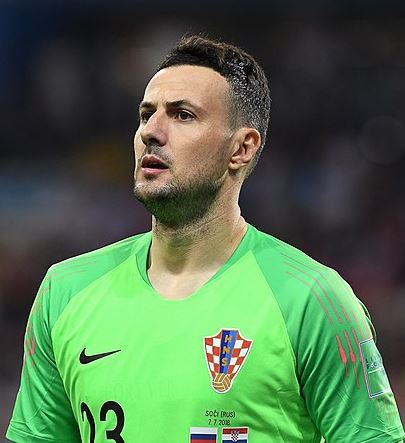
- Subašić with Croatia at the 2018 FIFA World Cup

Personal information
- Full name: Danijel Subašić
- Date of birth: 27 October 1984 (age 42)
- Place of birth: Zadar, SR Croatia, SFR Yugoslavia
- Height: 1.91 m (6 ft 3 in)
- Position: Goalkeeper

Youth career
- 2002–2003: Zadar

Senior career*
| Years | Team | Apps | (Gls) |
| 2003–2009 | Zadar | 81 | (0) |
| 2008–2009 | → Hajduk Split (loan) | 31 | (0) |
| 2009–2012 | Hajduk Split | 64 | (0) |
| 2012–2020 | Monaco | 244 | (1) |
| 2021–2023 | Hajduk Split | 5 | (0) |
| Total | | 425 | (1) |

International career
| 2006 | Croatia U21 | 6 | (0) |
| 2009–2018 | Croatia | 44 | (0) |

Managerial career
- 2023–2026: Croatia (goalkeeping coach)
Medal record
Men's football
Representing Croatia
FIFA World Cup
| Runner-up | 2018 Russia |
- * Club domestic league appearances and goals

Danijel Subašić (born 27 October 1984) is a Croatian former professional footballer who played as a goalkeeper. He currently works as the goalkeeping coach of the Croatia national team.

Subašić began his career in Croatia with Zadar and Hajduk. In January 2012, he joined Monaco, and went on to make 292 competitive appearances for them over eight-and-a-half years. He won Ligue 2 in 2012–13 and Ligue 1 in 2016–17, also being named the league's Goalkeeper of the Year in the latter season.

Subašić made his senior international debut for Croatia in 2009. He was part of their squads for two FIFA World Cups and as many UEFA European Championships. He was a member of the Croatian squad which ended as runners-up to France in the 2018 FIFA World Cup.

== Club career ==
=== Zadar ===
Subašić started his professional career in his hometown club Zadar during the 2003–04 season. Following Zadar's relegation from the top flight at the end of the 2004–05 season, he became a first-team regular during the club's time in the Croatian second division.

=== Hajduk Split ===
In the summer of 2008, he was loaned to Hajduk Split and immediately became a regular at the club, appearing in all of their 18 league matches in the first half of the 2008–09 season. During the winter break of the season, the club decided to convert the loan into a permanent transfer. Subašić kept his place as a regular in the second half of the season, making a further 13 league appearances for the club. Early in the season, he also made three appearances for the club in the UEFA Europa League qualifying.

During his second season with Hajduk, in 2009–10, he made a total of 28 league appearances, as well as another two appearances in the UEFA Europa League qualifying, and also helped the club win the Croatian Cup.

In the 2010–11 season, he made 20 appearances in the league. He had a knee injury in early November which kept him out of action until just prior to the new year. He was the first choice keeper before and after the injury. In that season, Hajduk also qualified for the UEFA Europa League where Danijel kept for all the league games bar one.

=== Monaco ===
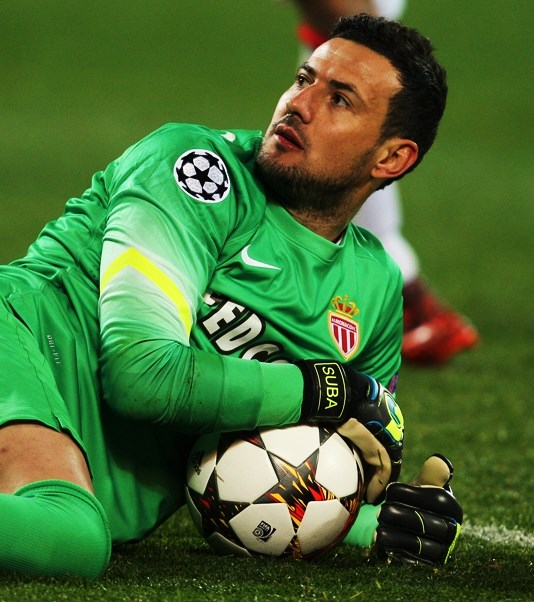
Subašić with Monaco in 2014.

In January 2012, Subašić joined AS Monaco in Ligue 2. He made 17 appearances for the club during the 2011–12 season, keeping five clean sheets. In Monaco's last Ligue 2 match of the 2011–12 season, he scored the winning goal from a free kick in a 2–1 away victory over Boulogne. In the 2012–13 season, Subašić played an important part in winning the Ligue 2 title and earning promotion to Ligue 1. He missed only 3 league matches. On 10 August 2013, he made his Ligue 1 debut for Monaco in a 2–0 win against Bordeaux.

During the 2013–14 season, which was his first season in Ligue 1, Subašić kept four clean sheets and experienced only one defeat in Monaco's first 13 Ligue 1 matches. Subašić played 35 matches in Ligue 1 as Monaco finished runner-up in 2013–14 season. During the 2014–15 season, Subašić kept eight consecutive clean sheets in Ligue 1 matches; on 8 February 2015, his run of not conceding a goal in Ligue 1 ended after 842 minutes in an away match against Guingamp. In the 2016–17 season, Subašić played an important part in winning the first Ligue 1 title after 17 years, as well reaching the Champions League semi-finals, and was named Ligue 1's Goalkeeper of the Year.

Subašić missed the beginning of the 2019–20 season due to a hamstring injury and was replaced by Benjamin Lecomte, who joined Monaco in July 2019. However, Lecomte continued to play in the starting formation despite poor performances, even after Subašić had recovered for his injury. Subašić was relegated to a backup role and did not appear in any games during the whole season. On 8 June 2020, his departure was announced, after having spent eight-and-a-half years at Monaco.

=== Return to Hajduk Split ===
After one year without a contract, Subašić rejoined his old club Hajduk Split on 22 September 2021.

=== Retirement ===
On 28 May 2023, Subašić announced his retirement from professional football.

== International career ==
Subašić made his international debut with the Croatian under-21 national team, in a friendly match against Denmark on 1 March 2006. During the same year, he won a total of 6 international caps with the team, including two competitive appearances in the qualifying for the 2007 European Under-21 Championship.

In 2009, he was called up to the Croatia national team at the full international level, and made his debut for the team on 14 November 2009 in a friendly match against Liechtenstein in Vinkovci, playing the full 90 minutes and keeping a clean sheet in Croatia's 5–0 win. In May 2010, he won another two international caps in friendly matches, in the away fixtures at Austria and Estonia, keeping clean sheets in both matches. After Stipe Pletikosa retired from international football in 2014, Subašić became Croatia's first-choice goalkeeper.

=== UEFA Euro 2016 ===
In May 2016, Subašić was selected in Croatia's final 23-man squad for UEFA Euro 2016 in France. Subašić played in all of Croatia's group games, particularly playing a key role in Croatia 2–1 win over Spain; saving a penalty from Sergio Ramos, marking Spain's first defeat at a Euro finals match since 2004.

=== 2018 FIFA World Cup ===
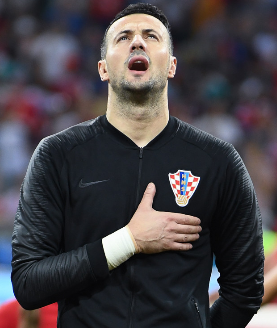
Subašić with Croatia before the game against Russia at the 2018 FIFA World Cup.

In May 2018, he was named in Croatia's final 23-man squad for the 2018 FIFA World Cup in Russia. Subašić was Croatia's regular starting goalkeeper throughout the tournament. Subašić played a key role in Croatia's match against Denmark in the round of sixteen, where he saved three penalties during the penalty shootout; thereby also equaling the record number set by Ricardo in the 2006 World Cup. His opposite number, Kasper Schmeichel, had saved a penalty kick in extra time and two penalties in the shootout to earn the Man of the Match award; Subašić and Schmeichel thus combined for a record six saves from the penalty spot in one game.

On 7 July, in the match against hosts Russia in the quarter-finals, Subašić suffered a minor injury in the last few minutes of the match, but despite this, Subašić kept on playing the match, making several important saves. In the penalty shootout, Subašić saved the first penalty from Fyodor Smolov; thereby becoming just the third goalkeeper in World Cup history to have made four or more saves in penalty shootouts at the World Cup finals; equaling the record made by Sergio Goycochea and Harald Schumacher, also making Croatia just the second team to have advanced on consecutive penalty shootouts, after Argentina in 1990. In the 2018 FIFA World Cup Final, Croatia lost 4–2 to France. Subašić received praise for his performance at the tournament, including from legendary German goalkeeper Oliver Kahn.

Following the conclusion of the World Cup, Subašić announced his retirement from the Croatia national team. He earned a total of 44 caps (1 unofficial).

== Personal life ==
Subašić was born to Jovan "Jovo" Subašić, an ethnic Serb from the village of Zagrad near Benkovac, who belonged to the Eastern Orthodox religion, and Boja (née Brkljača), from the village of Raštević who was Catholic. He was raised Catholic.

Subašić wears the image of his former NK Zadar teammate, Hrvoje Ćustić, under his jersey while playing. Ćustić died in an on-field accident in 2008. After the 2018 FIFA World Cup round of 16 match against Denmark, Subašić took off his shirt to display the image, but FIFA issued a warning to Subašić due to his "private message", as FIFA rules state that a player is not allowed to display private, political, religious or similar images. The decision was made by FIFA as a result of previous players taking off their jersey and displaying images or texts that could cause controversy. Following the match against Russia, Subašić walked up to the fans in order to take off his jersey and display the image once again, although he only showed a small part of it, as he was stopped by Croatia staff member Iva Olivari, whom he proceeded to hug afterwards.

== Career statistics ==
=== Club ===
Appearances and goals by club, season and competition
| Club | Season | League | | | National cup (Note: Includes Croatian Cup and Coupe de France) | | League cup | | Europe | | Other | | Total | |
| Club | Season | Division | Apps | Goals | Apps | Goals | Apps | Goals | Apps | Goals | Apps | Goals | Apps | Goals |
|---|---|---|---|---|---|---|---|---|---|---|---|---|---|---|
| Zadar | 2003–04 | Prva HNL | 1 | 0 | 0 | 0 | — | | — | | — | | 1 | 0 |
| Zadar | 2004–05 | Prva HNL | 12 | 0 | 0 | 0 | — | | — | | — | | 12 | 0 |
| Zadar | 2005–06 | Druga HNL | 27 | 0 | 1 | 0 | — | | — | | — | | 28 | 0 |
| Zadar | 2006–07 | Druga HNL | 13 | 0 | 0 | 0 | — | | — | | — | | 13 | 0 |
| Zadar | 2007–08 | Prva HNL | 28 | 0 | 0 | 0 | — | | — | | — | | 28 | 0 |
| Zadar | Total | | 81 | 0 | 1 | 0 | — | | — | | — | | 82 | 0 |
| Hajduk Split (loan) | 2008–09 | Prva HNL | 31 | 0 | 8 | 0 | — | | 3 (Note: Appearances in UEFA Europa League) | 0 | — | | 42 | 0 |
| Hajduk Split | 2009–10 | Prva HNL | 28 | 0 | 6 | 0 | — | | 2 | 0 | — | | 36 | 0 |
| Hajduk Split | 2010–11 | Prva HNL | 20 | 0 | 0 | 0 | — | | 7 | 0 | 1 (Note: Appearance in Croatian Super Cup) | 0 | 28 | 0 |
| Hajduk Split | 2011–12 | Prva HNL | 16 | 0 | 2 | 0 | — | | 2 | 0 | — | | 20 | 0 |
| Hajduk Split | Total | | 95 | 0 | 16 | 0 | — | | 14 | 0 | 1 | 0 | 126 | 0 |
| Monaco | 2011–12 | Ligue 2 | 17 | 1 | — | | — | | — | | — | | 17 | 1 |
| Monaco | 2012–13 | Ligue 2 | 35 | 0 | 0 | 0 | 0 | 0 | — | | — | | 35 | 0 |
| Monaco | 2013–14 | Ligue 1 | 35 | 0 | 0 | 0 | 0 | 0 | — | | — | | 35 | 0 |
| Monaco | 2014–15 | Ligue 1 | 37 | 0 | 0 | 0 | 0 | 0 | 10 (Note: Appearances in UEFA Champions League) | 0 | — | | 47 | 0 |
| Monaco | 2015–16 | Ligue 1 | 36 | 0 | 0 | 0 | 0 | 0 | 10 (Note: Four appearances in UEFA Champions League, six appearances in UEFA Europa League) | 0 | — | | 46 | 0 |
| Monaco | 2016–17 | Ligue 1 | 36 | 0 | 0 | 0 | 4 (Note: Appearances in Coupe de la Ligue) | 0 | 14 | 0 | — | | 54 | 0 |
| Monaco | 2017–18 | Ligue 1 | 34 | 0 | 0 | 0 | 2 | 0 | 3 | 0 | 1 (Note: Appearance in Trophée des Champions) | 0 | 40 | 0 |
| Monaco | 2018–19 | Ligue 1 | 14 | 0 | 1 | 0 | 1 | 0 | 1 | 0 | 0 | 0 | 17 | 0 |
| Monaco | 2019–20 | Ligue 1 | 0 | 0 | 0 | 0 | 1 | 0 | 0 | 0 | 0 | 0 | 1 | 0 |
| Monaco | Total | | 244 | 1 | 1 | 0 | 8 | 0 | 40 | 0 | 1 | 0 | 292 | 1 |
| Hajduk Split | 2021–22 | Prva HNL | 4 | 0 | 2 | 0 | — | | — | | — | | 6 | 0 |
| Hajduk Split | 2022–23 | Prva HNL | 1 | 0 | 0 | 0 | — | | 0 | 0 | 0 | 0 | 1 | 0 |
| Hajduk Split | Total | | 5 | 0 | 2 | 0 | — | | 0 | 0 | 0 | 0 | 7 | 0 |
| Career total | | | 423 | 1 | 20 | 0 | 8 | 0 | 52 | 0 | 2 | 0 | 505 | 1 |

=== International ===
Appearances and goals by national team and year
| National team | Year | Apps | Goals |
|---|---|---|---|
| Croatia | 2009 | 1 | 0 |
| Croatia | 2010 | 2 | 0 |
| Croatia | 2011 | 0 | 0 |
| Croatia | 2012 | 1 | 0 |
| Croatia | 2013 | 1 | 0 |
| Croatia | 2014 | 6 | 0 |
| Croatia | 2015 | 7 | 0 |
| Croatia | 2016 | 10 (Note: Four appearances in UEFA Euro 2016) | 0 |
| Croatia | 2017 | 7 | 0 |
| Croatia | 2018 | 9 (Note: Six appearances in FIFA World Cup 2018) | 0 |
| Total | | 44 | 0 |

== Honours ==
Hajduk Split

- Croatian Cup: 2009–10, 2021–22, 2022–23

Monaco

- Ligue 1: 2016–17
- Ligue 2: 2012–13

Croatia

- FIFA World Cup runner-up: 2018

Individual

- Ligue 1 Goalkeeper of the Year: 2016–17
- UNFP Ligue 1 Team of the Year: 2016–17
- Honorary citizen of the Zadar County: 2019
- City of Zadar Award: 2018

Orders

- Order of Duke Branimir: 2018
