= Alexandre Cuvillier =

French footballer (born 1986)

Personal information
- Date of birth: 17 June 1986 (age 40)
- Place of birth: Cucq, France
- Height: 1.82 m (6 ft 0 in)
- Position: Midfielder

Team information
- Current team: AS Blainville

Youth career
- 2003–2006: Stade de Reims

Senior career*
Years	Team	Apps	(Gls)
2006–2008	Stade de Reims	11	(1)
2008–2010	Boulogne	78	(10)
2010–2011	→ Nancy (loan)	25	(2)
2010–2011	→ Nancy II (loan)	5	(5)
2011–2014	Nancy	26	(3)
2012	→ Lens (loan)	11	(0)
2012–2013	→ Caen (loan)	30	(7)
2013	→ Caen II (loan)	1	(1)
2014–2016	Brest	32	(2)
2014–2016	Brest II	8	(3)
2017	Boulogne	3	(0)
2021	AS Blainville	2	(0)
- * Club domestic league appearances and goals as of 7 August 2021

Alexandre Cuvillier (born 17 June 1986) is a French footballer who played as a midfielder.

== Career ==
Cuvillier began his career at Stade de Reims. In 2008, he joined Ligue 2 side US Boulogne.

After retiring from football, he moved to Canada to pursue other projects. In 2021, he returned to the sport, joining AS Blainville, where he will play for the first team in the third-tier Première Ligue de soccer du Québec, as well as coach their U17 team.
