= Aadil Assana =

Footballer (born 1993)

Personal information
- Date of birth: 27 January 1993 (age 33)
- Place of birth: Marignane, France
- Height: 1.75 m (5 ft 9 in)
- Position: Defensive midfielder

Youth career
- 1999–2005: Vitrollesv
- 2005–2007: Pennes Mirabeau
- 2007–2008: Luynes
- 2008–2011: Monaco

Senior career*
Years	Team	Apps	(Gls)
2011–2014	Monaco	6	(0)
2011–2014	Monaco II	20	(0)
2012–2013	→ Lausanne-Sport II (loan)	2	(0)
2013	→ Clermont II (loan)	4	(0)
2013	→ CA Bastia (loan)	10	(0)
2017–2019	Marignane Gignac	42	(3)
2022	Martigues	7	(0)

International career^{‡}
2011	France U19	3	(0)
2018–	Comoros	4	(0)
- * Club domestic league appearances and goals as of 28 May 2022 ‡ National team caps and goals as of 7 June 2019

Aadil Assana (born 27 January 1993) is a professional footballer who plays for the Comoros national football team. He primarily plays as a defensive midfielder.

== Club career ==
Assana was a member of the Monaco under-19 team that won the 2010–11 edition of the Coupe Gambardella and made his professional debut on 23 September 2011 in a league match against Laval.

== International career ==
A former France youth international, Assana made his senior debut for the Comoros national football team in a 2–2 friendly draw with Kenya on 24 March 2018.
