= Florian Pinteaux =

French footballer (born 1992)

Personal information
- Date of birth: 4 February 1992 (age 34)
- Place of birth: Creil, France
- Height: 1.81 m (5 ft 11 in)
- Position: Full-back

Team information
- Current team: Beauvais
- Number: 15

Youth career
- 2004–2007: Albion Boys Club
- 2007–2011: Monaco

Senior career*
| Years | Team | Apps | (Gls) |
| 2011–2012 | Monaco B | 13 | (0) |
| 2011–2013 | Monaco | 12 | (0) |
| 2012–2013 | → Sedan (loan) | 28 | (1) |
| 2012 | → Sedan B (loan) | 2 | (0) |
| 2013–2015 | Le Havre | 26 | (1) |
| 2013–2014 | Le Havre B | 8 | (0) |
| 2015 | Arles-Avignon | 15 | (0) |
| 2015–2016 | Châteauroux | 12 | (0) |
| 2015–2016 | Châteauroux B | 9 | (0) |
| 2016–2017 | Sparta Rotterdam | 11 | (0) |
| 2016–2017 | Jong Sparta | 5 | (0) |
| 2017–2018 | Chambly | 15 | (0) |
| 2017–2020 | Chambly B | 5 | (0) |
| 2020– | Beauvais | 12 | (0) |

International career
| 2011–2012 | France U20 | 5 | (0) |
- * Club domestic league appearances and goals as of 17:19, 18 January 2022 (UTC)

Florian Pinteaux (born 4 February 1992) is a French professional footballer who plays as a full-back for Championnat National 1 club Beauvais.

== Club career ==
Born in Creil, Pinteaux began his youth career playing for Monaco. He signed a professional contract with Monaco in 2011 and made his first appearance in December 2011.

His performance with the reserve team was excellent and he signed his first professional contract in March 2010. He made his first appearance with the first team during the Ligue 2 match against Le Havre. The team played out for a 2–2 draw.

He joined Arles-Avignon in January 2015.

== Career statistics ==
As of match played 11 December 2021

Appearances and goals by club, season and competition
| Club | Season | League | | | National cup | | Other | | Total | |
| Club | Season | Division | Apps | Goals | Apps | Goals | Apps | Goals | Apps | Goals |
|---|---|---|---|---|---|---|---|---|---|---|
| Monaco B | 2010–11 | CFA | 2 | 0 | — | | — | | 2 | 0 |
| Monaco B | 2011–12 | CFA | 11 | 0 | — | | — | | 11 | 0 |
| Monaco B | Total | | 13 | 0 | 0 | 0 | 0 | 0 | 13 | 0 |
| Monaco | 2011–12 | Ligue 2 | 12 | 0 | 2 | 0 | 0 | 0 | 4 | 0 |
| Sedan (loan) | 2012–13 | Ligue 2 | 28 | 1 | 3 | 0 | 0 | 0 | 31 | 1 |
| Sedan B (loan) | 2012–13 | CFA 2 | 2 | 0 | — | | — | | 2 | 0 |
| Le Havre | 2013–14 | Ligue 2 | 22 | 1 | 1 | 0 | 1 (Note: Appearance in the Coupe de la Ligue) | 0 | 24 | 1 |
| Le Havre | 2014–15 | Ligue 2 | 4 | 0 | 1 | 0 | 0 | 0 | 5 | 0 |
| Le Havre | Total | | 26 | 1 | 2 | 0 | 1 | 0 | 29 | 1 |
| Le Havre B | 2013–14 | CFA 2 | 5 | 0 | — | | — | | 5 | 0 |
| Le Havre B | 2014–15 | CFA 2 | 3 | 0 | — | | — | | 3 | 0 |
| Le Havre B | Total | | 8 | 0 | 0 | 0 | 0 | 0 | 8 | 0 |
| Arles-Avignon | 2014–15 | Ligue 2 | 15 | 0 | 0 | 0 | 0 | 0 | 15 | 0 |
| Châteauroux | 2015–16 | National | 12 | 0 | 1 | 1 | 0 | | 13 | 1 |
| Châteauroux B | 2015–16 | CFA 2 | 9 | 0 | — | | — | | 9 | 0 |
| Sparta Rotterdam | 2016–17 | Eredivisie | 11 | 0 | 0 | 0 | 0 | 0 | 11 | 0 |
| Jong Sparta | 2016–17 | Tweede Divisie | 5 | 0 | — | | — | | 5 | 0 |
| Chambly | 2017–18 | National | 15 | 0 | 2 | 0 | — | | 17 | 0 |
| Chambly B | 2017–18 | National 3 | 4 | 0 | — | | — | | 4 | 0 |
| Chambly B | 2019–20 | National 3 | 1 | 0 | — | | — | | 1 | 0 |
| Chambly B | Total | | 5 | 0 | 0 | 0 | 0 | 0 | 5 | 0 |
| Beauvais | 2020–21 | National 2 | 7 | 0 | 0 | 0 | — | | 7 | 0 |
| Beauvais | 2021–22 | National 2 | 5 | 0 | 1 | 0 | — | | 6 | 0 |
| Beauvais | Total | | 12 | 0 | 1 | 0 | 0 | 0 | 13 | 0 |
| Career total | | | 173 | 2 | 11 | 1 | 1 | 0 | 117 | 3 |
