= Sébastien Chabbert =

French footballer (born 1978)

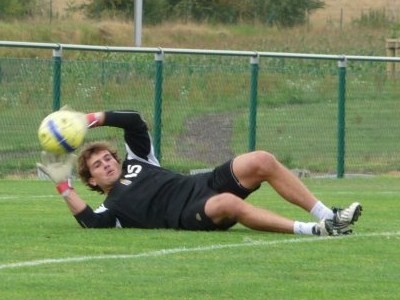
- Chabbert with Charleroi

Personal information
- Date of birth: 15 May 1978 (age 48)
- Place of birth: Pau, France
- Height: 1.84 m (6 ft 0 in)
- Position: Goalkeeper

Senior career*
Years	Team	Apps	(Gls)
1996–1999	Cannes	43	(0)
1999	→ Metz (loan)	2	(0)
1999–2007	Lens	26	(0)
2007–2009	Amiens	37	(0)
2009–2010	Charleroi	19	(0)
2010–2014	Monaco	10	(0)
- * Club domestic league appearances and goals

Sébastien Chabbert (born 15 May 1978) is a French former professional footballer who played as a goalkeeper.

== Honours ==
Lens

- UEFA Intertoto Cup: 2005
