= Tristan Dingomé =

French footballer (born 1991)

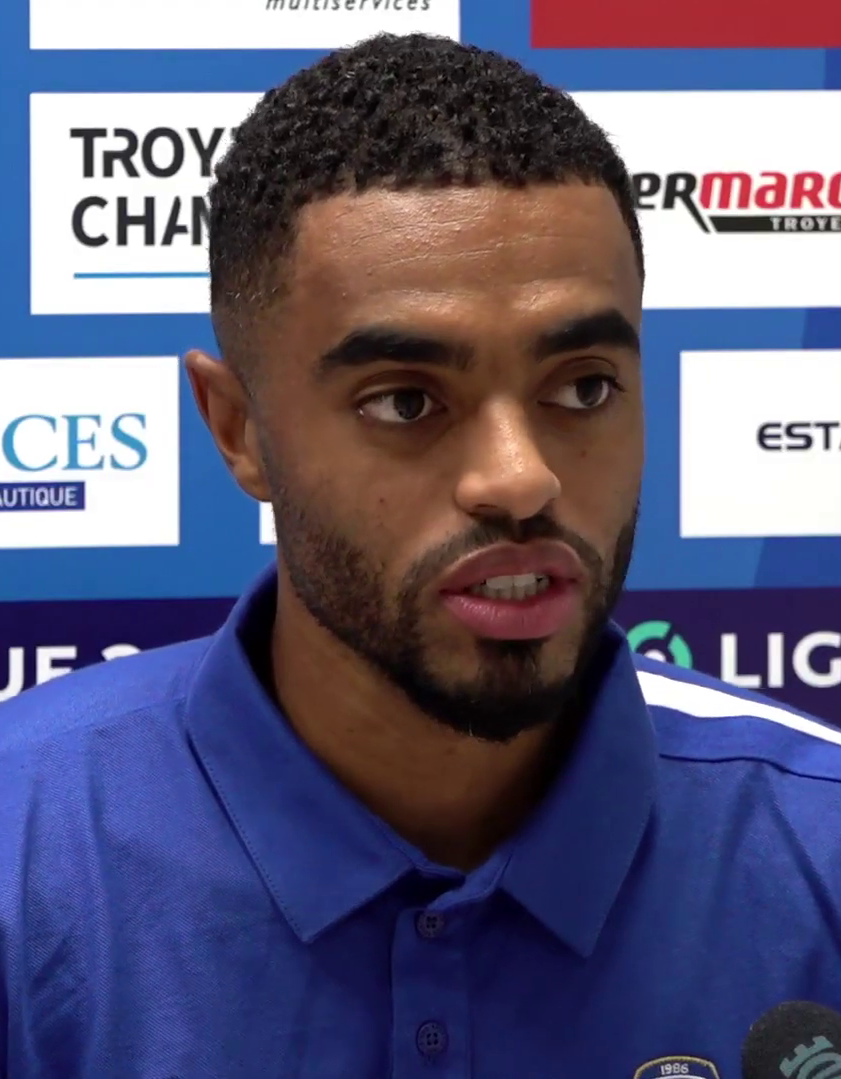
- Dingomé in 2020

Personal information
- Date of birth: 17 February 1991 (age 35)
- Place of birth: Les Ulis, France
- Height: 1.74 m (5 ft 9 in)
- Position: Left-back

Youth career
- US Palaiseau
- 2006–2011: Monaco

Senior career*
Years	Team	Apps	(Gls)
2011–2014	Monaco	47	(1)
2013–2014	→ Le Havre (loan)	31	(0)
2014–2016	Mouscron-Péruwelz	50	(3)
2016–2018	Troyes	45	(4)
2018–2020	Reims	36	(1)
2020–2023	Troyes	58	(6)
2023	Al-Fateh	8	(0)
- * Club domestic league appearances and goals as of 28 February 2021 ‡ National team caps and goals as of 1 July 2016

Tristan Dingomé (born 17 February 1991) is a French professional footballer who primarily plays as a left-back or left midfielder.

== Club career ==
=== Monaco ===
Born in Les Ulis, France, to a Cameroonian mother, and French Guianan Father, Dingomé began his football career at US Palaiseau as a youth before being spotted by Monaco when he was fifteen and joined the side. He spent five years in the youth setup before being promoted by Laurent Banide to the first team in Ligue 2 after the club was relegated.

Dingomé made his professional debut on 17 October 2011 in a league match against Guingamp, as they lost 4–0. He scores his first goal with Monaco in a French cup match against Alès. On 18 January 2012, he scored his first professional league goal against Amiens in a 2–1 win, in which he turns out to score a winning goal. However, new arrivals in the January transfer window saw Dingomé’s first team place fallen behind in the pecking order and fight for his place despite having more playing time. Despite this, Dingomé signed a new contract with the club that kept him until 2015. Until the end of the 2011–12 season, he went on to make 25 appearances scoring once in all competitions.

In the 2012–13 season, Dingomé missed the start of the season, due to injury. He made his first appearance of the season on 23 August 2012, in a 3–0 win over Arles-Avignon. But his season saw him on the sidelines, as he continued to find himself behind the pecking order. After making 19 appearances in all competitions in the 2012–13 season, Monaco were promoted back to Ligue 1 after two-year absence.

Dingomé signed another contract extension, that will keep him until 2016. Shortly after that, Dingomé joined Le Havre on a season long loan and was given number 12 shirt. He made his Le Havre debut on 9 August 2013, where he came on as a substitute, in a 1–0 loss against Clermont Foot. Under the management of Erick Mombaerts, Dingomé's playing time increased and he made 30 appearances.

=== Mouscron-Péruwelz ===
On 17 July 2014, Dingomé left Monaco for the newly promoted Belgian Pro League side Royal Mouscron-Péruwelz prior to the 2014–15 season. He rejected a permanent move to Le Havre in favour of joining Mouscron-Péruwelz.

Dingomé made his Mouscron-Péruwelz debut in the opening game of the season against Anderlecht, where he came on as a substitute in the 55th minutes, and seven minutes later, he set up a goal for Anice Badri, in a 3–1 loss. Since joining the club, he became a first team regular for the side. It wasn’t until on 26 October 2014 when Dingomé scored his first goal for the club, in a 2–2 draw against Lokeren. He scored his second goal for the side on 22 November 2014, in a 2–1 win over Lierse. On 9 May 2015, against Westerlo, Dingomé captained the side for the first time and set up a goal for Zinho Gano, in a 1–1 draw. In his first season at the club, he went on to make thirty–three appearances and scoring two times in all competitions.

In the 2015–16 season, Dingomé started the season well when he scored in his first appearance as captain, in a 3–1 loss against Mechelen on 8 August 2015. Dingomé captained the side in the next two matches for the side. However, he soon found himself in the sidelined, due to injury. Despite this, the club opted to take up their option of a contract extension that would ensure Dingomé’s stay until 2017. He finished the 2015–16 season with 20 appearances scoring once in all competitions.

=== Troyes ===
In July 2016, Dingomé signed a two-year contract with Troyes AC of Ligue 2. He was previously linked with a move to Standard Liège but joined Troyes instead.

Dingomé made his Troyes debut in the opening game of the season, in a 3–1 loss against Sochaux. In a follow–up match, he scored his first goal for the club, in a 2–1 loss against AC Ajaccio. However, he was soon sidelined with suspension and injury. He made his return from injury on 13 January 2017, starting the whole game, in a 2–1 against AC Ajaccio. Since returning to the first team from injury, Dingomé regained his first team place for the side. He then scored two goals in two matches between 17 March 2017 and 31 March 2017. In a match against Auxerre on 5 May 2017, Dingomé scored and set up one of the goals, in a 3–2 win. In his first season at Troye, he went on to make thirty–five appearances and scoring four times in all competitions.

In the 2017–18 season, Dingomé continued to be in the first team regular for the side. He then captained the side on two occasions, which both came against Olympique Lyonnais on 22 October 2017 and Strasbourg on 4 November 2017. However, in November 2017, he suffered a cruciate ligament tear during a 3–0 win over Angers. This sidelined him for the rest of the season. At the end of the 2017–18 season, Dingomé went on to make fourteen appearances in all competitions.

=== Reims ===
It was announced on 29 June 2018 that Dingomé joined Reims, signing a three–year contract. The move reported to cost €1m transfer fee.

However, he continued to remain in the sidelined, due to injury, but continued to train to recover from his injury. It wasn’t until on 28 October 2018 when Dingomé made his Stade de Reims debut, in a 2–0 win over Stade Rennais. However, his return was short–lived when he suffered from an injury during a 2–0 loss against Saint-Étienne on 10 November 2018. Dingomé returned to the starting line-up, coming on as a late substitute, in a 1–1 draw against Lille on 9 December 2018. On 2 February 2019, Dingomé scored his first goal for the club, in a 2–1 win over Marseille. After missing a one match suspension, Dingomé returned to the starting line-up from suspension, where he set up an equaliser for Rémi Oudin, in a 1–1 draw against Lille on 7 April 2019. Until the end of the 2018–19 season, Dingomé went on to make 23 appearances and scoring once in all competitions.

== International career ==
Dingomé is eligible to play either France or Cameroon.

In May 2019, Dingomé was added provisional squad for the African Cup of Nations by Manager Clarence Seedorf. However, he was cut from the squad after suffering from an injury.

== Personal life ==
While growing up, Dingomé idolised Shabani Nonda and supported Liverpool and Paris Saint-Germain.
