= Martin Sourzac =

French footballer (born 1992)

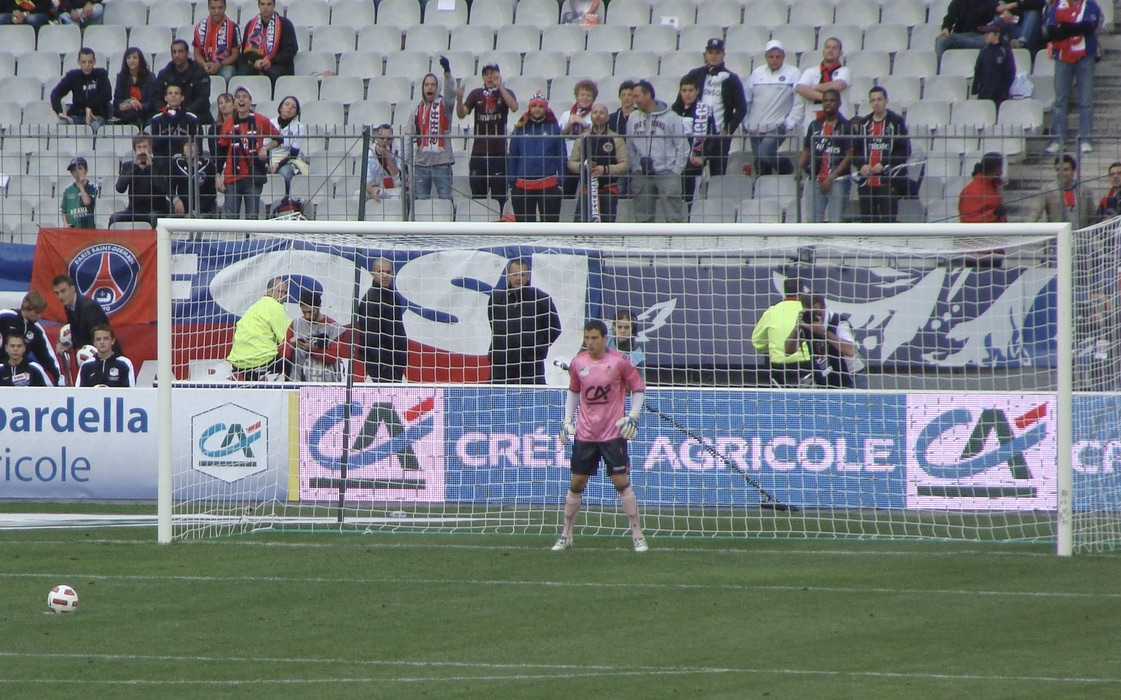

Personal information
- Date of birth: 25 March 1992 (age 34)
- Place of birth: Vendome, France
- Height: 1.84 m (6 ft 0 in)
- Position: Goalkeeper

Team information
- Current team: Imperia
- Number: 1

Senior career*
Years	Team	Apps	(Gls)
2011–2016	Monaco	10	(0)
2013–2014	→ RWDM Brussels (loan)	33	(0)
2017–2019	Nîmes	3	(0)
2019–2021	Nancy	14	(0)
2021–2022	Chambly	13	(0)
2022–2026	Nancy	90	(0)
2026–	Imperia	0	(0)
- * Club domestic league appearances and goals as of 10 November 2026

Martin Sourzac (born 25 March 1992) is a French professional footballer who plays as a goalkeeper for Italian Serie D club Imperia.

== Club career ==
On 12 July 2022, Sourzac returned to Nancy after one season away.

== Honours ==
Monaco

- Ligue 2: 2012–13

Nancy

- Championnat National: 2024–25
