= Gary Coulibaly =

French footballer (born 1986)

Personal information
- Date of birth: 30 March 1986 (age 40)
- Place of birth: Bastia, France
- Height: 1.83 m (6 ft 0 in)
- Position: Midfielder

Youth career
- –2004: Bastia

Senior career*
Years	Team	Apps	(Gls)
2004–2008	Bastia	35	(0)
2008–2011	Istres	107	(6)
2011–2014	Monaco	48	(1)
2014	Laval	13	(0)
2014–2015	Ajaccio	24	(0)
2015–2016	Waasland-Beveren	28	(0)
2016–2017	Levadiakos	24	(0)
2017–2022	Bastia	64	(2)

International career
2007–2008	France U20	6	(0)
2009–2010	Corsica	11	(0)
- * Club domestic league appearances and goals

Gary Coulibaly (born 30 March 1986) is a French former professional footballer who played as a midfielder. He was born in Corsica in France and is of Malian descent. He previously represented France at under-20 level, but has represented Corsica at senior level.

== Career ==
Born in Bastia, Coulibaly began his career with SC Bastia and made 35 league appearances in four seasons with the club, one of them being in Ligue 1. He moved to Istres in July 2008 and helped the club gain promotion to Ligue 2 as National champions in his first season. Two years later, Coulibaly was transferred to Monaco, having scored 6 goals in 107 games for Istres.

In January 2014, he was released by Monaco, having played no games for the club in almost a year. A few days later, he signed a six months contract with Laval.

Six months later, Coulibaly returned to his native island, joining Ligue 2 side AC Ajaccio.

In July 2015, he joined Belgian First Division A club Waasland-Beveren on a free transfer. He signed a one-year contract with the option of another.

In August 2017, Coulibaly returned to his former club SC Bastia as one of four new signings announced by the club, which had played in Ligue 1 in the 2016–17 season but dropped to the fifth-tier Championnat National 3 after filing bankruptcy.
