= Isaac Koné =

Ivorian footballer (born 1991)

Personal information
- Full name: Isaac Koné
- Date of birth: 3 January 1991 (age 35)
- Place of birth: Paris, France
- Height: 1.81 m (5 ft 11 1/2 in)
- Position: Central midfielder

Team information
- Current team: Ionikos
- Number: 5

Youth career
- 2006–2011: Monaco

Senior career*
Years	Team	Apps	(Gls)
2011–2012	Monaco	3	(0)
2012–2015	Fréjus Saint-Raphaël	30	(5)
2015–2016	RWS Bruxelles	56	(0)
2016–2017	Royal Antwerp	19	(0)
2017–2019	Cercle Brugge	50	(0)
2021–	Ionikos	1	(0)

International career
2011	Ivory Coast U23	1	(0)
- * Club domestic league appearances and goals as of 20:55, 7 April 2021 (UTC)

Isaac Koné (born 3 January 1991) is an Ivorian footballer who plays as a central midfielder for Ionikos.

== Club career ==
Koné trained at Monaco's youth academy and played in the youth level. Following Monaco relegated to Ligue 2 in the 2010–11 Ligue 1, he got a chance to play in the senior squad. However, he was released from his side after the 2011–12 season.

In July 2012, he joined Championnat National side Fréjus Saint-Raphaël.

== International career ==
He debuts with Ivory Coast U23 on 11 October 2011 against Morocco (0-2).

== Honours ==
Ionikos

- Super League Greece 2: 2020–21
