= Kévin Diaz (footballer, born 1988) =

French footballer

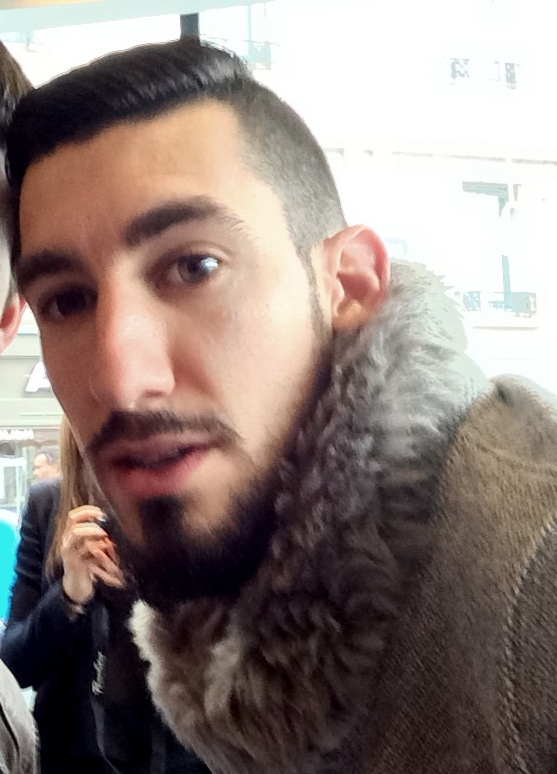
- Diaz with Tours in 2015

Personal information
- Full name: Kévin Diaz
- Date of birth: 18 August 1988 (age 38)
- Place of birth: Istres, France
- Height: 1.74 m (5 ft 9 in)
- Position: Attacking midfielder

Team information
- Current team: Istres

Youth career
- 2002–2008: Monaco

Senior career*
Years	Team	Apps	(Gls)
2008–2012	Monaco	5	(0)
2009–2010	→ Ajaccio (loan)	28	(4)
2010–2011	→ Metz (loan)	15	(3)
2011–2012	→ Metz (loan)	26	(3)
2012–2013	Nice	8	(0)
2013–2015	Tours	34	(1)
2015–2018	Red Star	22	(0)
2018–	Istres	37	(7)
- * Club domestic league appearances and goals as of 1 August 2020

Kévin Diaz (born 18 August 1988) is a French professional footballer who plays as a midfielder for FC Istres.

== Career ==
Diaz joined the principality-based side AS Monaco in 2002. He was officially promoted to the first-team for the 2008–09 Ligue 1 season and made his debut on 30 August 2008 in a 1–0 loss against Grenoble coming on as a substitute. On 21 July 2009, AC Ajaccio announced that they had signed the midfielder on loan from Monaco for the entire season. After two consecutive seasons with FC Metz on loan, he completed move to OGC Nice, signing a one-year contract with the option of two years.

In August 2013, he signed a two-year deal with Tours in Ligue 2.

In July 2015, Diaz signed for newly promoted side Red Star F.C.
