= 2004–05 FC Istres season =

FC Istres
2004–05 season
- President: Bertrand Benoît
- Head coach: Mehmed Baždarević; Xavier Gravelaine
- Stadium: Stade des Costières; Stade Parsemain
- Ligue 1: 20th (relegated)
- Coupe de France: Round of 64
- Coupe de la Ligue: Round of 32
- Top goalscorer: League: Moussa N'Diaye (6); All: Moussa N'Diaye (6)
- Average home league attendance: 7,207

The 2004–05 season was the 85th season in the existence of FC Istres and the club's first season back in the top flight of French football. In addition to the domestic league, Istres participated in this season's edition of the Coupe de France and the Coupe de la Ligue. The season covered the period from 1 July 2004 to 30 June 2005.

== First-team squad ==
Squad at end of season

Note: Flags indicate national team as defined under FIFA eligibility rules; some limited exceptions apply. Players may hold more than one non-FIFA nationality.

| No. | Pos. | Nation | Player |
|---|---|---|---|
| 1 | GK | FRA | Laurent Weber |
| 2 | FW | BRA | Leandro Amaral |
| 3 | DF | FRA | Christophe Dumolin |
| 4 | DF | MLI | Brahim Thiam (Note: Thiam was born in Bobigny, France, and represented them at U-20 level, but also qualified to represent Mali internationally and made his international debut for Mali in 2001.) |
| 5 | DF | FRA | Bruno Savry |
| 7 | MF | FRA | Laurent Mohellebi |
| 8 | DF | SCG | Niša Saveljić |
| 9 | DF | SEN | Abdoulaye Faye (on loan from Lens) |
| 10 | FW | ALG | Rafik Saïfi |
| 11 | FW | COL | Víctor Montaño |
| 12 | FW | COD | Fiston Kuku |
| 13 | MF | FRA | Philippe Delaye |
| 14 | DF | FRA | Romain Trouche |
| 15 | MF | SCG | Dejan Ilić |
| 16 | GK | FRA | Rudy Riou |
| 17 | MF | MAR | Azzeddine Ourahou (Note: Ourahou was born in Nîmes, France, but also qualified to represent Morocco internationally and represented them at the 2004 Summer Olympics.) |
| 18 | MF | FRA | Sébastien Pérez |

| No. | Pos. | Nation | Player |
|---|---|---|---|
| 19 | FW | CIV | Ibrahima Bakayoko |
| 20 | MF | FRA | Franck Chaussidière |
| 21 | MF | FRA | Amor Kehiha |
| 22 | MF | SEN | Moussa N'Diaye |
| 23 | DF | FRA | David Hamed |
| 24 | DF | CMR | Patrick Leugueun |
| 25 | MF | SVN | Luka Žinko |
| 26 | DF | MAR | Noureddine Kacemi |
| 27 | DF | FRA | Steven Pelé |
| 28 | MF | TUN | Adel Chedli (Note: Chedli was born in La Ricamarie, France, but also qualified to represent Tunisia internationally and made his international debut for Tunisia in May 1996.) |
| 29 | MF | FRA | Laurent Courtois |
| 33 | MF | FRA | Cedric Gimenez |
| 34 | MF | FRA | Anthony Sichi |
| — | GK | FRA | Benoît Aureille |
| — | GK | FRA | Julien Mondillon |
| — | FW | FRA | Christophe Caldeirinha |

=== Left club during season ===
Note: Flags indicate national team as defined under FIFA eligibility rules; some limited exceptions apply. Players may hold more than one non-FIFA nationality.

| No. | Pos. | Nation | Player |
|---|---|---|---|
| 6 | MF | TAH | Gérald Forschelet (to Neuchâtel Xamax) |
| 18 | FW | FRA | Florian Maurice (to Châteauroux) |

| No. | Pos. | Nation | Player |
|---|---|---|---|
| 19 | FW | FRA | Steeve Theophile (to Charleroi) |

== Competitions ==
=== Overall record ===
| Competition | First match | Last match | Starting round | Final position | Record | | | | | | | |
| Competition | First match | Last match | Starting round | Final position | Pld | W | D | L | GF | GA | GD | Win % |
|---|---|---|---|---|---|---|---|---|---|---|---|---|
| Ligue 1 | 7 August 2004 | 28 May 2005 | Matchday 1 | 20th | 38 | 6 | 14 | 18 | 25 | 51 | −26 | 15.79 |
| Coupe de France | 8 January 2005 | | Round of 64 | Round of 64 | 1 | 0 | 0 | 1 | 0 | 2 | −2 | 0.00 |
| Coupe de la Ligue | 10 November 2004 | | Round of 32 | Round of 32 | 1 | 0 | 0 | 1 | 2 | 4 | −2 | 0.00 |
| Total | | | | | 40 | 6 | 14 | 20 | 27 | 57 | −30 | 15.00 |

Source: Competitions

=== Ligue 1 ===
==== League table ====
| Pos | Team | Pld | W | D | L | GF | GA | GD | Pts | Qualification or relegation |
|---|---|---|---|---|---|---|---|---|---|---|
| 16 | Metz | 38 | 10 | 14 | 14 | 33 | 45 | −12 | 44 | |
| 17 | Nantes | 38 | 10 | 13 | 15 | 33 | 38 | −5 | 43 | |
| 18 | Caen (R) | 38 | 10 | 12 | 16 | 36 | 60 | −24 | 42 | Relegation to Ligue 2 |
| 19 | Bastia (R) | 38 | 11 | 8 | 19 | 32 | 48 | −16 | 41 | Relegation to Ligue 2 |
| 20 | Istres (R) | 38 | 6 | 14 | 18 | 25 | 51 | −26 | 32 | Relegation to Ligue 2 |

Source: Ligue 1
Rules for classification: 1) points; 2) goal difference; 3) number of goals scored.
(R) Relegated

==== Results summary ====
| Overall | | | | | | | | Home | | | | | | Away | | | | | |
| Pld | W | D | L | GF | GA | GD | Pts | W | D | L | GF | GA | GD | W | D | L | GF | GA | GD |
|---|---|---|---|---|---|---|---|---|---|---|---|---|---|---|---|---|---|---|---|
| 38 | 6 | 14 | 18 | 25 | 51 | −26 | 32 | 5 | 5 | 9 | 11 | 19 | −8 | 1 | 9 | 9 | 14 | 32 | −18 |

Source: Ligue 1

==== Results by round ====
| Round | 1 | 2 | 3 | 4 | 5 | 6 | 7 | 8 | 9 | 10 | 11 | 12 | 13 | 14 | 15 | 16 | 17 | 18 | 19 | 20 | 21 | 22 | 23 | 24 | 25 | 26 | 27 | 28 | 29 | 30 | 31 | 32 | 33 | 34 | 35 | 36 | 37 | 38 |
|---|---|---|---|---|---|---|---|---|---|---|---|---|---|---|---|---|---|---|---|---|---|---|---|---|---|---|---|---|---|---|---|---|---|---|---|---|---|---|
| Ground | A | A | H | A | H | A | H | A | H | A | H | A | H | A | H | A | H | A | H | H | A | H | A | H | A | H | A | H | A | H | A | H | A | H | A | H | A | H |
| Result | D | L | L | D | D | L | L | D | L | D | D | D | L | D | D | L | W | L | L | L | W | D | D | L | D | W | D | L | L | D | L | W | L | L | L | W | L | W |
| Position | 9 | 15 | 16 | 16 | 16 | 18 | 20 | 19 | 19 | 19 | 20 | 20 | 20 | 20 | 20 | 20 | 20 | 20 | 20 | 20 | 20 | 20 | 20 | 20 | 20 | 20 | 20 | 20 | 20 | 20 | 20 | 20 | 20 | 20 | 20 | 20 | 20 | 20 |

Source: Ligue 1
A = Away; H = Home; W = Win; D = Draw; L = Loss

==== Matches ====
| 7 August 2004 1 | Caen | 1–1 | Istres | Caen |
| 20:00 CEST (UTC+2) | | Report | | Stadium: Stade Michel d'Ornano; Attendance: 16,450; Referee: Philippe Malige |

| 14 August 2004 2 | Monaco | 2–1 | Istres | Monaco |
| 20:00 CEST (UTC+2) | | Report | | Stadium: Stade Louis II; Attendance: 12,687; Referee: Dominique Fraise |

| 21 August 2004 3 | Istres | 0–2 | Lens | Nîmes |
| 20:00 CEST (UTC+2) | | Report | | Stadium: Stade des Costières; Attendance: 7,855; Referee: Patrick Lhermite |

| 28 August 2004 4 | Strasbourg | 1–1 | Istres | Strasbourg |
| 20:00 CEST (UTC+2) | | Report | | Stadium: Stade de la Meinau; Attendance: 10,745; Referee: Tony Chapron |

| 11 September 2004 5 | Istres | 1–1 | Paris Saint-Germain | Nîmes |
| 20:00 CEST (UTC+2) | | Report | | Stadium: Stade des Costières; Attendance: 10,512; Referee: Philippe Kalt |

| 18 September 2004 6 | Nantes | 1–0 | Istres | Nantes |
| 20:00 CEST (UTC+2) | | Report | | Stadium: Stade de la Beaujoire; Attendance: 28,115; Referee: Olivier Thual |

| 22 September 2004 7 | Istres | 0–1 | Ajaccio | Nîmes |
| 20:30 CEST (UTC+2) | | Report | | Stadium: Stade des Costières; Attendance: 5,573; Referee: Thierry Auriac |

| 25 September 2004 8 | Auxerre | 0–0 | Istres | Auxerre |
| 20:00 CEST (UTC+2) | | Report | | Stadium: Stade de l'Abbé Deschamps; Attendance: 7,656; Referee: Fredy Fautrel |

| 2 October 2004 9 | Istres | 0–2 | Marseille | Nîmes |
| 17:15 CEST (UTC+2) | | Report | | Stadium: Stade des Costières; Attendance: 13,614; Referee: Claude Colombo |

| 16 October 2004 10 | Bordeaux | 2–2 | Istres | Bordeaux |
| 20:00 CEST (UTC+2) | | Report | | Stadium: Stade Chaban-Delmas; Attendance: 17,516; Referee: Bruno Ruffray |

| 23 October 2004 11 | Istres | 0–0 | Lyon | Nîmes |
| 17:15 CEST (UTC+2) | Thiam (red card) 75' | Report | | Stadium: Stade des Costières; Attendance: 10,197; Referee: Stéphane Bre |

| 30 October 2004 12 | Nice | 0–0 | Istres | Nice |
| 20:00 CEST (UTC+2) | | Report | | Stadium: Stade du Ray; Attendance: 9,740; Referee: Stéphane Moulin |

| 7 November 2004 13 | Istres | 0–2 | Lille | Nîmes |
| 18:00 CET (UTC+1) | | Report | | Stadium: Stade des Costières; Attendance: 6,745; Referee: Bruno Derrien |

| 13 November 2004 14 | Sochaux | 1–1 | Istres | Montbéliard |
| 20:00 CET (UTC+1) | | Report | | Stadium: Stade Auguste Bonal; Attendance: 14,908; Referee: Hervé Piccirillo |

| 20 November 2004 15 | Istres | 0–0 | Metz | Nîmes |
| 20:00 CET (UTC+1) | | Report | | Stadium: Stade des Costières; Attendance: 4,775; Referee: Olivier Thual |

| 27 November 2004 16 | Rennes | 3–1 | Istres | Rennes |
| 20:00 CET (UTC+1) | | Report | | Stadium: Stade de la Route de Lorient; Attendance: 17,571; Referee: Dominique Fraise |

| 4 December 2004 17 | Istres | 1–0 | Bastia | Nîmes |
| 20:00 CET (UTC+1) | | Report | | Stadium: Stade des Costières; Attendance: 5,027; Referee: Bruno Ruffray |

| 11 December 2004 18 | Toulouse | 2–1 | Istres | Toulouse |
| 20:00 CET (UTC+1) | | Report | | Stadium: Stadium de Toulouse; Attendance: 23,751; Referee: Stéphane Lannoy |

| 18 December 2004 19 | Istres | 0–2 | Saint-Étienne | Nîmes |
| 20:00 CET (UTC+1) | | Report | | Stadium: Stade des Costières; Attendance: 10,740; Referee: Hervé Piccirillo |

| 12 January 2005 20 | Istres | 0–1 | Monaco | Nîmes |
| 20:00 CET (UTC+1) | | Report | | Stadium: Stade des Costières; Attendance: 6,390; Referee: Fredy Fautrel |

| 15 January 2005 21 | Lens | 0–1 | Istres | Lens |
| 20:00 CET (UTC+1) | | Report | | Stadium: Stade Félix-Bollaert; Attendance: 31,798; Referee: Bruno Derrien |

| 22 January 2005 22 | Istres | 1–1 | Strasbourg | Nîmes |
| 20:00 CET (UTC+1) | | Report | | Stadium: Stade des Costières; Attendance: 4,927; Referee: Bruno Coué |

| 26 January 2005 23 | Paris Saint-Germain | 2–2 | Istres | Paris |
| 20:30 CET (UTC+1) | | Report | | Stadium: Parc des Princes; Attendance: 29,445; Referee: Dominique Fraise |

| 30 January 2005 24 | Istres | 0–1 | Nantes | Nîmes |
| 19:00 CET (UTC+1) | | Report | | Stadium: Stade des Costières; Attendance: 5,539; Referee: Alain Sars |

| 5 February 2005 25 | Ajaccio | 0–0 | Istres | Ajaccio |
| 20:00 CET (UTC+1) | | Report | | Stadium: Stade François Coty; Attendance: 1,969; Referee: Pascal Garibian |

| 20 February 2005 26 | Istres | 1–0 | Auxerre | Nîmes |
| 18:00 CET (UTC+1) | | Report | | Stadium: Stade des Costières; Attendance: 5,754; Referee: Tony Chapron |

| 27 February 2005 27 | Marseille | 1–1 | Istres | Marseille |
| 21:00 CET (UTC+1) | | Report | | Stadium: Stade Vélodrome; Attendance: 48,766; Referee: Stéphane Bré |

| 5 March 2005 28 | Istres | 0–1 | Bordeaux | Nîmes |
| 20:00 CET (UTC+1) | | Report | | Stadium: Stade des Costières; Attendance: 5,825; Referee: Bruno Ruffray |

| 12 March 2005 29 | Lyon | 2–1 | Istres | Lyon |
| 17:15 CET (UTC+1) | | Report | | Stadium: Stade de Gerland; Attendance: 37,291; Referee: Fredy Fautrel |

| 19 March 2005 30 | Istres | 1–1 | Nice | Nîmes |
| 20:00 CET (UTC+1) | | Report | | Stadium: Stade des Costières; Attendance: 4,745; Referee: Pascal Garibian |

| 2 April 2005 31 | Lille | 8–0 | Istres | Villeneuve d'Ascq |
| 20:00 CEST (UTC+2) | | Report | | Stadium: Stadium Lille Métropole; Attendance: 14,756; Referee: Claude Colombo |

| 9 April 2005 32 | Istres | 2–0 | Sochaux | Fos-sur-Mer |
| 20:00 CEST (UTC+2) | | Report | | Stadium: Stade Parsemain; Attendance: 7,397; Referee: Dominique Fraise |

| 16 April 2005 33 | Metz | 2–1 | Istres | Metz |
| 20:00 CEST (UTC+2) | | Report | | Stadium: Stade Saint-Symphorien; Attendance: 17,742; Referee: Damien Ledentu |

| 23 April 2005 34 | Istres | 0–2 | Rennes | Fos-sur-Mer |
| 20:00 CEST (UTC+2) | | Report | | Stadium: Stade Parsemain; Attendance: 5,452; Referee: Bruno Derrien |

| 7 May 2005 35 | Bastia | 2–0 | Istres | Furiani |
| 20:00 CEST (UTC+2) | | Report | | Stadium: Stade Armand Cesari; Attendance: 5,017; Referee: Fredy Fautrel |

| 14 May 2005 36 | Istres | 1–0 | Toulouse | Fos-sur-Mer |
| 20:00 CEST (UTC+2) | | Report | | Stadium: Stade Parsemain; Attendance: 5,267; Referee: Bruno Coué |

| 21 May 2005 37 | Saint-Étienne | 2–0 | Istres | Saint-Étienne |
| 20:45 CEST (UTC+2) | | Report | | Stadium: Stade Geoffroy-Guichard; Attendance: 34,913; Referee: Stéphane Moulin |

| 28 May 2005 38 | Istres | 3–2 | Caen | Fos-sur-Mer |
| 20:00 CEST (UTC+2) | | Report | | Stadium: Stade Parsemain; Attendance: 5,474; Referee: Thierry Auriac |

=== Coupe de France ===
| 8 January 2005 Round of 64 | Bordeaux | 2–0 | Istres | Bordeaux |
| 15:00 CET (UTC+1) | Laslandes 21'; Jemmali 86' | | | Stadium: Stade Chaban-Delmas; Attendance: 8,781; Referee: Thierry Auriac |

=== Coupe de la Ligue ===
| 10 November 2004 Round of 32 | Guingamp | 4–2 (a.e.t.) | Istres | Guingamp |
| 19:00 CET (UTC+1) | Fauré 5', 118'; Bridonneau 92'; Sikimić 103' | | Maurice 12' (pen.); Courtois 108' | Stadium: Stade de Roudourou; Attendance: 5,035; Referee: Fredy Fautrel |
