= 2001–02 FC Istres season =

Season of a football league in France

FC Istres
2001–02 season
- French Division 2: 17th
- Coupe de France: Eighth round
- Coupe de la Ligue: First round

The 2001–02 season was the 82nd season in the existence of FC Istres and the club's third consecutive season in the second division of French football. In addition to the domestic league, FC Istres competed in this season's edition of the Coupe de France and Coupe de la Ligue. The season covered the period from 1 July 2001 to 30 June 2002.

== Players ==
=== First-team squad ===
Note: Flags indicate national team as defined under FIFA eligibility rules; some limited exceptions apply. Players may hold more than one non-FIFA nationality.

No.	Pos.	Nation	Player
—	GK	FRA	Laurent Quievreux
—	GK	FRA	Julien Mondillon
—	DF	MLI	Samba Diawara
—	DF	FRA	Bruno Savry
—	DF	MLI	Brahim Thiam
—	DF	FRA	Eric Elisor
—	DF	MLI	Cédric Kanté
—	DF	FRA	Bark Seghiri
—	DF	FRA	Nordine Aiteur
—	DF	FRA	Sébastien Blanc
—	DF	FRA	Pierre Bernard
—	DF	FRA	Ludovic Aringhieri
—	DF	FRA	Amor Kehiha
—	DF	FRA	Gabriel Richter
—	DF	FRA	Christophe Dumolin
—	MF	FRA	Jean-Yves de Blasiis

No.	Pos.	Nation	Player
—	MF	FRA	Pascal Berenguer
—	MF	FRA	Xavier Imbert
—	MF	POR	Filipe Teixeira
—	MF	FRA	Nicolas Fabiano
—	MF	FRA	Malik Hebbar
—	MF	FRA	Franck Chaussidière
—	MF	FRA	Aurélien Mille
—	MF	FRA	Cédric Mouret
—	MF	FRA	Patrice Maurel
—	FW	GUI	Ibrahima Bangoura
—	FW	ALG	Nassim Akrour
—	FW	ALG	Sabri Tabet
—	FW	YUG	Dragan Đukanović
—	FW	FRA	Laurent Castro
—	FW	CMR	Ousmane Sanda Sanda

== Competitions ==
Win Draw Loss

=== Overall record ===
Competition	First match	Last match	Starting round	Final position	Record							
Competition	First match	Last match	Starting round	Final position	Pld	W	D	L	GF	GA	GD	Win %
Division 2	28 July 2001	3 May 2002	Matchday 1	17th	38	8	17	13	34	43	−9	21.05
Coupe de France	3 November 2001	23 November 2001	Seventh round	Eighth round	2	1	0	1	4	4	+0	50.00
Coupe de la Ligue	1 September 2001		First round	First round	1	0	0	1	0	2	−2	0.00
Total					41	9	17	15	38	49	−11	21.95

Source: Competitions

=== French Division 2 ===
==== League table ====
Pos	Team	Pld	W	D	L	GF	GA	GD	Pts	Promotion or Relegation
15	Wasquehal	38	11	10	17	43	55	−12	43	
16	Grenoble	38	10	12	16	38	55	−17	42	
17	Istres	38	8	17	13	34	43	−9	41	
18	Créteil	38	9	14	15	35	46	−11	41	
19	Nîmes (R)	38	5	17	16	33	48	−15	32	Relegation to Championnat National [fr]

Source: Ligue 2
(R) Relegated

==== Results summary ====
Overall								Home						Away					
Pld	W	D	L	GF	GA	GD	Pts	W	D	L	GF	GA	GD	W	D	L	GF	GA	GD
38	8	17	13	34	43	−9	41	5	7	7	16	20	−4	3	10	6	18	23	−5

Source: Ligue 2

==== Results by round ====
Round	1	2	3	4	5	6	7	8	9	10	11	12	13	14	15	16	17	18	19	20	21	22	23	24	25	26	27	28	29	30	31	32	33	34	35	36	37	38
Ground	A	A	H	A	H	A	H	A	H	A	H	A	H	A	H	A	H	A	H	H	A	H	A	H	A	H	A	H	A	H	A	H	A	H	A	H	A	H
Result	W	L	L	L	L	D	W	D	L	D	L	W	W	D	L	D	D	L	L	D	L	D	D	D	D	W	D	D	D	D	L	D	W	W	D	L	L	W
Position	5	10	13	16	19	18	14	15	18	18	20	15	12	13	14	14	14	17	17	17	17	18	17	17	18	17	17	17	17	17	17	17	17	17	17	17	17	17

Source: Ligue 2
A = Away; H = Home; W = Win; D = Draw; L = Loss

==== Matches ====
28 July 2001 1	Saint-Étienne	1–2	Istres	Saint-Étienne
--:-- CEST (UTC+2)				Stadium: Stade Geoffroy-Guichard

4 August 2001 2	Laval	2–0	Istres	Laval
--:-- CEST (UTC+2)				Stadium: Stade Francis Le Basser

11 August 2001 3	Istres	0–1	Strasbourg	Istres
--:-- CEST (UTC+2)				Stadium: Stade Bernard Bardin

18 August 2001 4	Niort	2–0	Istres	Niort
--:-- CEST (UTC+2)				Stadium: Stade René Gaillard

25 August 2001 5	Istres	0–2	Beauvais	Istres
--:-- CEST (UTC+2)				Stadium: Stade Bernard Bardin

29 August 2001 6	Nîmes	0–0	Istres	Nîmes
--:-- CEST (UTC+2)				Stadium: Stade des Costières

8 September 2001 7	Istres	1–0	Nancy	Istres
--:-- CEST (UTC+2)				Stadium: Stade Bernard Bardin

15 September 2001 8	Châteauroux	1–1	Istres	Châteauroux
--:-- CEST (UTC+2)				Stadium: Stade Gaston-Petit

21 September 2001 9	Istres	0–3	Caen	Istres
--:-- CEST (UTC+2)				Stadium: Stade Bernard Bardin

29 September 2001 10	Ajaccio	1–1	Istres	Ajaccio
--:-- CEST (UTC+2)				Stadium: Stade François Coty

5 October 2001 11	Istres	0–1	Le Mans	Istres
--:-- CEST (UTC+2)				Stadium: Stade Bernard Bardin

12 October 2001 12	Grenoble	0–5	Istres	Grenoble
--:-- CEST (UTC+2)				Stadium: Stade Lesdiguières

19 October 2001 13	Istres	2–1	Wasquehal	Istres
--:-- CEST (UTC+2)				Stadium: Stade Bernard Bardin

27 October 2001 14	Créteil	1–1	Istres	Créteil
--:-- CEST (UTC+2)				Stadium: Stade Dominique Duvauchelle

	Istres	v	Ajaccio	Istres
--:-- CEST (UTC+2)				Stadium: Stade Bernard Bardin

	Istres	v	Amiens	Istres
--:-- CEST (UTC+2)				Stadium: Stade Bernard Bardin

	Amiens	v	Istres	Amiens
--:-- CEST (UTC+2)				Stadium: Stade de la Licorne

	Beauvais	v	Istres	Beauvais
--:-- CEST (UTC+2)				Stadium: Stade Pierre Brisson

	Caen	v	Istres	Caen
--:-- CEST (UTC+2)				Stadium: Stade Michel d'Ornano

	Istres	v	Châteauroux	Istres
--:-- CEST (UTC+2)				Stadium: Stade Bernard Bardin

	Istres	v	Créteil	Istres
--:-- CEST (UTC+2)				Stadium: Stade Bernard Bardin

	Istres	v	Grenoble	Istres
--:-- CEST (UTC+2)				Stadium: Stade Bernard Bardin

	Istres	v	Gueugnon	Istres
--:-- CEST (UTC+2)				Stadium: Stade Bernard Bardin

	Gueugnon	v	Istres	Gueugnon
--:-- CEST (UTC+2)				Stadium: Stade Jean Laville

	Istres	v	Laval	Istres
--:-- CEST (UTC+2)				Stadium: Stade Bernard Bardin

	Istres	v	Le Havre	Istres
--:-- CEST (UTC+2)				Stadium: Stade Bernard Bardin

	Le Havre	v	Istres	Le Havre
--:-- CEST (UTC+2)				Stadium: Stade Jules Deschaseaux

	Le Mans	v	Istres	Le Mans
--:-- CEST (UTC+2)				Stadium: Stade Léon-Bollée

	Istres	v	Martigues	Istres
--:-- CEST (UTC+2)				Stadium: Stade Bernard Bardin

	Martigues	v	Istres	Martigues
--:-- CEST (UTC+2)				Stadium: Stade Francis Turcan

	Nancy	v	Istres	Tomblaine
--:-- CEST (UTC+2)				Stadium: Stade Marcel Picot

	Istres	v	Nice	Istres
--:-- CEST (UTC+2)				Stadium: Stade Bernard Bardin

	Nice	v	Istres	Nice
--:-- CEST (UTC+2)				Stadium: Stade du Ray

	Istres	v	Nîmes	Istres
--:-- CEST (UTC+2)				Stadium: Stade Bernard Bardin

	Istres	v	Niort	Istres
--:-- CEST (UTC+2)				Stadium: Stade Bernard Bardin

	Istres	v	Saint-Étienne	Istres
--:-- CEST (UTC+2)				Stadium: Stade Bernard Bardin

	Strasbourg	v	Istres	Strasbourg
--:-- CEST (UTC+2)				Stadium: Stade de la Meinau

	Wasquehal	v	Istres	Villeneuve-d'Ascq
--:-- CEST (UTC+2)				Stadium: Stadium Lille Métropole

=== Coupe de la Ligue ===
1 September 2001 First round	CS Louhans-Cuiseaux	2–0	Istres	Louhans
--:-- CEST (UTC+2)				Stadium: Parc des Sports du Bram; Attendance: 1,316; Referee: Jean-Marc Rodolphe

== Statistics ==
=== Squad statistics ===
No.	Pos	Nat	Player	Total		Division 2		Coupe de France		Coupe de la Ligue			
No.	Pos	Nat	Player	Apps	Goals	Apps	Goals	Apps	Goals	Apps	Goals		
Goalkeepers
1	GK	(France) FRA		0	0	0	0	0	0	0	0	0	0
1	GK	(France) FRA		0	0	0	0	0	0	0	0	0	0
Defenders
1	DF	(France) FRA		0	0	0	0	0	0	0	0	0	0
1	DF	(France) FRA		0	0	0	0	0	0	0	0	0	0
Midfielders
1	MF	(France) FRA		0	0	0	0	0	0	0	0	0	0
1	MF	(France) FRA		0	0	0	0	0	0	0	0	0	0
Forwards
1	FW	(France) FRA		0	0	0	0	0	0	0	0	0	0
1	FW	(France) FRA		0	0	0	0	0	0	0	0	0	0
Players who have made an appearance or had a squad number this season but have left the club
1	GK	(France) FRA		0	0	0	0	0	0	0	0	0	0

=== Goalscorers ===
Rank	No.	Pos	Nat	Name	Division 2	Coupe de France	Coupe de la Ligue	Total	
1	1	FW	(France)		0	0	0	0	
2	2	MF	(France)		0	0	0	0	
2	Totals					0	0	0	0
