= Sichi (surname) =

Sichi (/'siki/ see-key) is a surname of Italian origin. In Italy, most Sichis can be found in Tuscany, particularly in the mountain comune of Cutigliano and the associated nearby village of Pian degli Ontani. Several people surnamed Sichi emigrated from Italy to the United States in the late 19th and early 20th centuries; Sichis can be found primarily in western Pennsylvania and California, with a few others in Texas, North Carolina, Virginia, the Midwest and East Coast. The surname Sichi can also occasionally be found in France, the United Kingdom, Brazil, and Argentina.

== Notable persons ==
- Anthony Sichi, French footballer
