= 2014–15 AS Monaco FC season =

Monaco
2014–15 season
- President: Dmitry Rybolovlev
- Head coach: Leonardo Jardim
- Stadium: Stade Louis II
- Ligue 1: 3rd
- Coupe de France: Quarter-finals
- Coupe de la Ligue: Semi-finals
- UEFA Champions League: Quarter-finals
- Top goalscorer: League: Anthony Martial; Bernardo Silva (9 each); All: Anthony Martial (12)
- Highest home attendance: 17,263 vs Arsenal (17 March 2015)
- Lowest home attendance: 800 vs Evian (21 January 2015)
- Average home league attendance: 7,811
Home colours	Away colours	Third colours

The 2014–15 season was AS Monaco FC's second season back in Ligue 1 since promotion from Ligue 2 in 2013. They participated in the Ligue 1, the UEFA Champions League, the Coupe de France, and the Coupe de la Ligue.

== Squad ==
As of 21 January 2015.

Note: Flags indicate national team as defined under FIFA eligibility rules; some limited exceptions apply. Players may hold more than one non-FIFA nationality.

No.	Pos.	Nation	Player
1	GK	CRO	Danijel Subašić
2	DF	BRA	Fabinho (on loan from Rio Ave)
3	DF	FRA	Layvin Kurzawa
5	DF	TUN	Aymen Abdennour
6	DF	POR	Ricardo Carvalho
7	MF	MAR	Nabil Dirar
8	MF	POR	João Moutinho
9	FW	BUL	Dimitar Berbatov
12	FW	BRA	Matheus Carvalho (on loan from Fluminense)
13	DF	BRA	Wallace (on loan from Braga)
14	MF	FRA	Tiémoué Bakayoko
15	MF	POR	Bernardo Silva
16	GK	NED	Maarten Stekelenburg (on loan from Fulham)
17	MF	BEL	Yannick Carrasco

No.	Pos.	Nation	Player
18	FW	FRA	Valère Germain (vice-captain)
19	FW	CIV	Lacina Traoré
21	DF	NGR	Elderson Echiéjilé
22	MF	FRA	Geoffrey Kondogbia
23	FW	FRA	Anthony Martial
24	DF	ITA	Andrea Raggi
25	FW	BFA	Alain Traoré (on loan from Lorient)
28	MF	FRA	Jérémy Toulalan (captain)
29	MF	FRA	Dylan Bahamboula
34	DF	SEN	Abdou Diallo
37	MF	FRA	Abdou Aziz Thiam
38	DF	MLI	Almamy Touré
40	GK	FRA	Marc-Aurèle Caillard

=== Out on loan ===
Note: Flags indicate national team as defined under FIFA eligibility rules; some limited exceptions apply. Players may hold more than one non-FIFA nationality.

No.	Pos.	Nation	Player
—	GK	FRA	Paul Nardi (at Nancy)
—	DF	FRA	Yarouba Cissako (at Zulte Waregem)
—	DF	FRA	Nicolas Isimat-Mirin (at PSV)
—	DF	COD	Marcel Tisserand (at Toulouse)
—	DF	ESP	Borja López (at Deportivo La Coruña)
—	MF	CGO	Delvin N'Dinga (at Olympiacos)
—	MF	MAR	Mounir Obbadi (at Hellas Verona)
—	MF	MAR	Fawzi Ouaamar (at Arles-Avignon)

No.	Pos.	Nation	Player
—	MF	FRA	Jessy Pi (at Troyes)
—	MF	ARG	Lucas Ocampos (at Marseille)
—	FW	COL	Radamel Falcao (at Manchester United)
—	FW	GUI	Tafsir Chérif (at Auxerre)
—	FW	ITA	Gaetano Monachello (at Virtus Lanciano)
—	FW	FRA	Quentin Ngakoutou (at Arles-Avignon)
—	FW	CMR	Edgar Salli (at Académica de Coimbra)

== Transfers ==
=== Summer ===
In:

No.	Pos.	Nat.	Name	Age	EU	Moving from	Type	Transfer window	Ends	Transfer fee	Source
2	DF	(Brazil)	Fabinho	20	Non-EU	Rio Ave (Portugal)	Loan	Summer	2015	Loan	
5	DF	(Tunisia)	Aymen Abdennour	24	Non-EU	Toulouse (France)	Transfer	Summer	2018	€13M	
13	DF	(Brazil)	Wallace	19	EU	Braga (Portugal)	Loan	Summer	2015	Loan	
14	MF	(France)	Tiémoué Bakayoko	19	EU	Rennes (France)	Transfer	Summer			
15	MF	(Portugal)	Bernardo Silva	19	EU	Benfica (Portugal)	Loan	Summer	2015	Loan	
16	GK	(Netherlands)	Maarten Stekelenburg	31	EU	Fulham (England)	Loan	Summer	2015	Loan	
19	FW	(Ivory Coast)	Lacina Traoré	23	Non-EU	Everton (England)	Loan return	Summer		Loan return	
20	DF	(Spain)	Borja López	20	EU	Rayo Vallecano (Spain)	Loan return	Summer		Loan return	

Out:

No.	Pos.	Nat.	Name	Age	EU	Moving to	Type	Transfer window	Transfer fee	Source
9	FW	(Colombia)	Radamel Falcao	28	Non-EU	Manchester United (England)	One Year Loan	Summer	N/A	
10	MF	(Colombia)	James Rodríguez	23	Non-EU	Real Madrid (Spain)	Transfer	Summer	€80M	
16	GK	(Argentina)	Sergio Romero	27	Non-EU	Sampdoria (Italy)	Loan return	Summer	N/A	
19	MF	(Morocco)	Mounir Obbadi	31	Non-EU	Hellas Verona (Italy)	One Year Loan	Summer	N/A	
20	DF	(France)	Nicolas Isimat-Mirin	22	EU	PSV (Netherlands)	One Year Loan	Summer	N/A	
22	DF	(France)	Eric Abidal	34	EU	Olympiacos (Greece)	Transfer	Summer	Free	
25	MF	(France)	Jessy Pi	20	EU	Troyes	One Year Loan	Summer	N/A	
25	FW	(Italy)	Gaetano Monachello	20	EU	Free agent	Released	Summer	N/A	
26	FW	(France)	Terence Makengo	22	EU	Free agent	Released	Summer	N/A	
28	MF	(Cameroon)	Edgar Salli	21	Non-EU	Académica (Portugal)	One Year Loan	Summer	N/A	
29	FW	(France)	Emmanuel Rivière	24	EU	Newcastle United (England)	Transfer	Summer	£6M	
30	GK	(Italy)	Flavio Roma	40	EU	Retired	Released	Summer	N/A	
31	DF	(Germany)	Andreas Wolf	32	EU	Retired	Released	Summer	N/A	
41	GK	(France)	Axel Maraval	20	EU	Free agent	Released	Summer	N/A	
	GK	(France)	Martin Sourzac	22	EU	Free agent	Released	Summer	N/A	
	GK	(France)	Sébastien Chabbert	36	EU	Free agent	Released	Summer	N/A	
	DF	(Algeria)	Carl Medjani	29	EU	Trabzonspor (Turkey)	Released	Summer	N/A	
	DF	(France)	Jérémy Labor	22	EU	Free agent	Released	Summer	N/A	
	DF	(Uruguay)	Gary Kagelmacher	26	Non-EU	1860 Munich (Germany)	Released	Summer	N/A	
	DF	(France)	Jérôme Phojo	21	EU	Arles-Avignon	Released	Summer	N/A	
	MF	(Republic of the Congo)	Delvin N'Dinga	26	Non-EU	Olympiacos (Greece)	One Year Loan	Summer	N/A	
	MF	(France)	Aadil Assana	21	EU	Free agent	Released	Summer	N/A	
	MF	(France)	Dominique Pandor	21	EU	Free agent	Released	Summer	N/A	
	MF	(France)	Tristan Dingomé	23	EU	Royal Mouscron-Péruwelz (Belgium)	Released	Summer	N/A	
	FW	(Cameroon)	Edgar Salli	21	Non-EU	Académica (Portugal)	One Year Loan	Summer	N/A	
	FW	(Netherlands)	Nacer Barazite	24	EU	Utrecht (Netherlands)	Released	Summer	N/A	

EU = if holds or not a European Union passport; Country: when 2 flags, 1st flag = country that plays for internationally, 2nd flag = country of birth; N = number on jersey; P = Position (for position name, pause mouse pointer on abbreviation); Name = Name on jersey (for more extensive name, pause mouse pointer on name); Age = age on the day of the signing; Moving from = only indicate the club the player was playing before start playing for this club in this season, for the type of the moving see Status column; Moving to = only indicates the club the player is going to play next, for the type of the moving see Status column; Ends = when the player's current contract ends; n/a = Not applicable.

=== Winter ===
In:

No.	Pos.	Nat.	Name	Age	EU	Moving from	Type	Transfer window	Ends	Transfer fee	Source
15	MF	(Portugal)	Bernardo Silva	19	EU	Benfica (Portugal)	Transfer	Winter	2019		
12	FW	(Brazil)	Matheus Carvalho	21	Non-EU	Fluminense (Brazil)	Transfer	Winter	2015	Loan	
25	FW	(Burkina Faso)	Alain Traoré	26	EU	Lorient (France)	Transfer	Winter	2015	Loan	

Out:

No.	Pos.	Nat.	Name	Age	EU	Moving to	Type	Transfer window	Transfer fee	Source
20	DF	(Spain)	Borja López	19	EU	Deportivo La Coruña (Spain)	Loan	Winter	N/A	
11	MF	(Argentina)	Lucas Ocampos	19	Non-EU	Marseille (France)	Loan	Winter	N/A	

EU = if holds or not a European Union passport; Country: when 2 flags, 1st flag = country that plays for internationally, 2nd flag = country of birth; N = number on jersey; P = Position (for position name, pause mouse pointer on abbreviation); Name = Name on jersey (for more extensive name, pause mouse pointer on name); Age = age on the day of the signing; Moving from = only indicate the club the player was playing before start playing for this club in this season, for the type of the moving see Status column; Moving to = only indicates the club the player is going to play next, for the type of the moving see Status column; Ends = when the player's current contract ends; n/a = Not applicable.

== Competitions ==
=== Ligue 1 ===
==== League table ====
Pos	Team	Pld	W	D	L	GF	GA	GD	Pts	Qualification or relegation
1	Paris Saint-Germain (C)	38	24	11	3	83	36	+47	83	Qualification for the Champions League group stage
2	Lyon	38	22	9	7	72	33	+39	75	Qualification for the Champions League group stage
3	Monaco	38	20	11	7	51	26	+25	71	Qualification for the Champions League third qualifying round
4	Marseille	38	21	6	11	76	42	+34	69	Qualification for the Europa League group stage
5	Saint-Étienne	38	19	12	7	51	30	+21	69	Qualification for the Europa League third qualifying round (Note: Since winners of the 2014–15 Coupe de la Ligue, Paris Saint-Germain, qualified for European competition based on their league position, the spot awarded to the Coupe de la Ligue winner (Europa League third qualifying round) is passed to the next best team in the table not already qualified for any European competition (in this case, the fifth-placed team).)

Source: Ligue 1
Rules for classification: 1) points; 2) goal difference; 3) number of goals scored
(C) Champions

==== Results summary ====
Overall								Home						Away					
Pld	W	D	L	GF	GA	GD	Pts	W	D	L	GF	GA	GD	W	D	L	GF	GA	GD
38	20	11	7	48	26	+22	71	8	9	2	23	10	+13	12	2	5	25	16	+9

Last updated: 23 May 2015.
Source: Competitive matches

==== Results by round ====
Round	1	2	3	4	5	6	7	8	9	10	11	12	13	14	15	16	17	18	19	20	21	22	23	24	25	26	27	28	29	30	31	32	33	34	35	36	37	38
Ground	H	A	A	H	A	H	A	H	A	H	A	H	A	H	A	H	A	H	A	H	H	A	H	A	A	H	A	H	A	H	H	A	H	A	H	A	H	A
Result	L	L	W	D	L	W	W	L	D	W	W	D	D	D	L	W	W	W	W	D	W	W	D	L	W	D	W	W	W	D	D	W	D	W	W	L	W	W
Position	15	19	17	15	19	16	11	12	13	10	8	7	8	8	10	8	7	6	5	5	5	5	5	5	5	4	4	4	4	4	4	3	3	3	3	3	3	3

Source: Ligue1
A = Away; H = Home; W = Win; D = Draw; L = Loss

==== Matches ====
Win Draw Loss

10 August 2014 1	Monaco	1–2	Lorient	Monaco
21:00 CEST (UTC+02:00)	Abdennour (yellow card) 9'; Dirar (yellow card) 40'; Berbatov (yellow card) 48'; R. Carvalho (yellow card) 53' (yellow-red card) 68'; Falcao 78' (pen.)	Report	Aboubakar 9' (pen.), (yellow card) 65'; Coutadeur (yellow card) 15'; Lavigne 87'	Stadium: Stade Louis II; Attendance: 13,960; Referee: Ruddy Buquet

17 August 2014 2	Bordeaux	4–1	Monaco	Bordeaux
21:00 CEST (UTC+02:00)	Rolán 48', 65'; Khazri (yellow card) 57', (goal) 74' (pen.); Sala 61' (pen.)	Report	Toulalan (yellow card) 32'; Berbatov 45'; Abdennour (yellow card) 60'; Subašić (yellow card) 74'	Stadium: Stade Chaban-Delmas; Attendance: 28,285; Referee: Tony Chapron

24 August 2014 3	Nantes	0–1	Monaco	Nantes
21:00 CEST (UTC+02:00)		Report	Subašić (yellow card) 23'; Falcao 45'; Berbatov (yellow card) 89'	Stadium: Stade de la Beaujoire; Attendance: 27,042; Referee: Amaury Delerue

30 August 2014 4	Monaco	1–1	Lille	Monaco
17:00 CEST (UTC+02:00)	Raggi (yellow card) 60'; Berbatov 61'	Report	Roux 18', (yellow card) 43'; Enyeama (yellow card) 41'; Souaré (yellow card) 54'	Stadium: Stade Louis II; Attendance: 9,345; Referee: Saïd Ennjimi

12 September 2014 5	Lyon	2–1	Monaco	Lyon
20:30 CEST (UTC+02:00)	Jallet (yellow card) 14'; Fekir 30'; Tolisso 73'	Report	Ocampos 39'; Toulalan (yellow card) 56'	Stadium: Stade de Gerland; Attendance: 34,099; Referee: Benoît Bastien

21 September 2014 6	Monaco	1–0	Guingamp	Monaco
17:00 CEST (UTC+02:00)	Dirar 38'; Kurzawa (yellow card) 59'; Moutinho (yellow card) 78'; Toulalan (yellow card) 87'	Report	Angoua (yellow card) 37'; Lemaître (yellow card) 53'	Stadium: Stade Louis II; Attendance: 6,351; Referee: Mikaël Lesage

24 September 2014 7	Montpellier	0–1	Monaco	Montpellier
19:00 CEST (UTC+02:00)	Montaño (yellow card) 86'	Report	Fabinho (yellow card) 69'; Germain 90+3'	Stadium: Stade de la Mosson; Attendance: 11,570; Referee: Alexandre Castro

27 September 2014 8	Monaco	0–1	Nice	Monaco
14:00 CEST (UTC+02:00)	Berbatov (yellow card) 19'; Dirar (yellow card) 73'	Report	Carlos Eduardo 7'; Hult (yellow card) 29'; Bauthéac (yellow card) 49'; Bosetti (yellow card) 85'; Eysseric (yellow card) 86'	Stadium: Stade Louis II; Attendance: 8,941; Referee: Ruddy Buquet

5 October 2014 9	Paris Saint-Germain	1–1	Monaco	Paris
21:00 CEST (UTC+02:00)	Verratti (yellow card) 45+1'; Matuidi (yellow card) 63'; Moura 71', (yellow card) 89'	Report	Carrasco (yellow card) 28'; Moutinho (yellow card) 87'; Martial 90+2'	Stadium: Parc des Princes; Attendance: 45,308; Referee: Benoît Bastien

18 October 2014 10	Monaco	2–0	Evian	Monaco
20:00 CEST (UTC+02:00)	Moutinho 2' (pen.); Bakayoko (yellow card) 43'; Toulalan (yellow card) 63'; Carrasco 71'; Silva (yellow card) 87'	Report	Barbosa (yellow card) 3'; Koné (yellow card) 59'; Tejeda (yellow card) 69'	Stadium: Stade Louis II; Attendance: 5,497; Referee: Olivier Thual

25 October 2014 11	Bastia	1–3	Monaco	Bastia
20:00 CEST (UTC+02:00)	Maboulou 22', (yellow card) 86'; Palmieri (yellow card) 37'; Diakité (yellow card) 90+1'	Report	Germain 6'; Raggi (yellow card) 38'; Kondogbia 78'; Carrasco 85'; Bakayoko (yellow card) 90+1'	Stadium: Stade Armand Cesari; Attendance: 13,106; Referee: Antony Gautier

31 October 2014 12	Monaco	1–1	Reims	Monaco
20:30 CET (UTC+01:00)	Echiéjilé 22'; Kondogbia (yellow card) 70'	Report	Charbonnier (yellow card) 61'; Fofana (yellow card) 76'; Moukandjo 80'	Stadium: Stade Louis II; Attendance: 5,488; Referee: Sébastien Desiage

9 November 2014 13	Saint-Étienne	1–1	Monaco	Saint-Étienne
17:00 CET (UTC+01:00)	Tabanou (yellow card) 28'; Sall (yellow card) 42'; Van Wolfswinkel 58'	Report	Traoré 17'; Bakayoko (yellow card) 34' (yellow-red card) 72'; Raggi (yellow card) 42'; R. Carvalho (yellow card) 44'	Stadium: Stade Geoffroy-Guichard; Attendance: 29,403; Referee: Stéphane Lannoy

22 November 2014 14	Monaco	2–2	Caen	Monaco
20:00 CET (UTC+01:00)	Imorou 5' (o.g.); Moutinho 75'	Report	Koita 50'; Kondogbia 59' (o.g.); Da Silva (yellow card) 72'; Raspentino (yellow card) 90+4'	Stadium: Stade Louis II; Attendance: 7,508; Referee: Sébastien Moreira

29 November 2014 15	Rennes	2–0	Monaco	Rennes
20:00 CET (UTC+01:00)	Abdennour 10' (o.g.); Toivonen 19'; Doucouré (yellow card) 62'	Report	Raggi (yellow card) 52'; Fabinho (yellow card) 73'	Stadium: Stade de la Route de Lorient; Attendance: 17,213; Referee: Bastien

2 December 2014 16	Monaco	2–0	Lens	Monaco
21:00 CET (UTC+01:00)	Wallace (red card) 35'; Berbatov 64'; Carrasco 90+3'	Report	Cyprien (yellow card) 59'; Lemoigne (yellow card) 63'	Stadium: Stade Louis II; Attendance: 5,686; Referee: Frank Schneider

5 December 2014 17	Toulouse	0–2	Monaco	Toulouse
20:30 CET (UTC+01:00)	Grigore (yellow card) 53'	Report	Berbatov (yellow card) 33', (goal) 45', 77' (pen.); Ocampos (yellow card) 90+4'	Stadium: Stadium Municipal; Attendance: 9,978; Referee: Mikael Lesage

14 December 2014 18	Monaco	1–0	Marseille	Monaco
21:00 CET (UTC+01:00)	Moutinho (yellow card) 44'; Silva 67'; Raggi (yellow card) 86'; Ocampos (yellow card) 90+4'	Report	Lemina (yellow card) 45+1'; Mendy (yellow card) 74'	Stadium: Stade Louis II; Attendance: 12,648; Referee: Tony Chapron

20 December 2014 19	Metz	0–1	Monaco	Metz
20:00 CET (UTC+01:00)	Doukouré (yellow card) 12'; Marchal (yellow card) 15'; Malouda (yellow card) 89'	Report	Moutinho (yellow card) 61'; Carrasco 79'	Stadium: Stade Municipal Saint-Symphorien; Attendance: 18,354; Referee: Lionel Jaffredo

11 January 2015 20	Monaco	0–0	Bordeaux	Monaco
21:00 CET (UTC+01:00)	Bakayoko (yellow card) 89'	Report	Sertic (yellow card) 66'	Stadium: Stade Louis II; Attendance: 5,579; Referee: Stéphane Lannoy

17 January 2015 21	Monaco	1–0	Nantes	Monaco
20:00 CET (UTC+01:00)	Carrasco (yellow card) 59'; Silva 73'	Report	Gakpé (yellow card) 38'	Stadium: Stade Louis II; Attendance: 5,692; Referee: Sébastien Desiage

24 January 2015 22	Lille	0–1	Monaco	Lille
17:00 CET (UTC+01:00)	Delaplace (yellow card) 52'; Lopes (yellow card) 58'	Report	Berbatov 57'; Carrasco (yellow card) 72'; Toulalan (yellow card) 76'	Stadium: Stade Pierre-Mauroy; Attendance: 34,898; Referee: Fredy Fautrel

1 February 2015 23	Monaco	0–0	Lyon	Monaco
21:00 CET (UTC+01:00)	Dirar (yellow card) 27'	Report	Dabo (yellow card) 16'	Stadium: Stade Louis II; Attendance: 7,161; Referee: Benoît Millot

8 February 2015 24	Guingamp	1–0	Monaco	Guingamp
14:00 CET (UTC+01:00)	Diallo (red card) 22'; Jacobsen (yellow card) 29'; Lévêque 51'; Yatabaré (yellow card) 90+1'	Report	Carrasco (yellow card) 31'; Wallace (yellow card) 36'	Stadium: Stade du Roudourou; Attendance: 13,532; Referee: Ruddy Buquet

20 February 2015 26	Nice	0–1	Monaco	Nice
20:30 CET (UTC+01:00)	Mendy (yellow card) 26'; Gomis (yellow card) 57'; Diawara (yellow card) 77'; Koziello (yellow card) 87'; Eysseric (yellow card) 88'	Report	Abdennour (red card) 45+3'; Silva 85'	Stadium: Allianz Riviera; Attendance: 24,130; Referee: Benoit Bastien

1 March 2015 27	Monaco	0–0	Paris Saint-Germain	Monaco
21:00 CET (UTC+01:00)	Subašić (yellow card) 90'	Report	Van der Wiel (yellow card) 72'; David Luiz (yellow card) 88'	Stadium: Stade Louis II; Attendance: 12,065; Referee: Bartolomeu Varela

7 March 2015 28	Evian	1–3	Monaco	Annecy
20:00 CET (UTC+01:00)	Sougou 78'	Report	Martial 18'; Abdallah 18' (o.g.); Touré 60'; Kondogbia (yellow card) 83'	Stadium: Parc des Sports; Attendance: 10,905; Referee: Nicolas Rainville

13 March 2015 29	Monaco	3–0	Bastia	Monaco
20:30 CET (UTC+01:00)	Martial 22', 51'; M. Carvalho 42'	Report	Diakité (red card) 32'; Sio (red card) 72'	Stadium: Stade Louis II; Attendance: 5,764; Referee: Ruddy Buquet

22 March 2015 30	Reims	1–3	Monaco	Reims
17:00 CET (UTC+01:00)	Conte (yellow card) 21'; Moukandjo (yellow card) 65'; Diego 70'; Mavinga (yellow card) 78'	Report	Fabinho 5'; Martial 14'; Toulalan (yellow card) 43'; Carrasco (yellow card) 53'; Dirar 79'	Stadium: Stade Auguste Delaune; Attendance: 14,692; Referee: Frank Schneider

3 April 2015 31	Monaco	1–1	Saint-Étienne	Monaco
20:30 CEST (UTC+02:00)	Moutinho (yellow card) 64'; Martial 68'; Raggi (yellow card) 83'; Fabinho (yellow card) 90+2'	Report	Erdinç 62'; Tabanou (yellow card) 70'	Stadium: Stade Louis II; Attendance: 8,894; Referee: Lionel Jaffredo

7 April 2015 25	Monaco	0–0	Montpellier	Monaco
19:00 CEST (UTC+02:00)	Martial (yellow card) 59'	Report	Dabo (yellow card) 72'; Congré (yellow card) 90'	Stadium: Stade Louis II; Attendance: 5,676; Referee: Saïd Ennjimi

10 April 2015 32	Caen	0–3	Monaco	Caen
20:30 CEST (UTC+02:00)	Bazile (yellow card) 27'; Imorou (yellow card) 42'	Report	Martial 29'; Silva 64', 84'	Stadium: Stade Michel d'Ornano; Attendance: 20,065; Referee: Tony Chapron

18 April 2015 33	Monaco	1–1	Rennes	Monaco
20:00 CEST (UTC+02:00)	Silva 28'; Echiéjilé (yellow card) 90'	Report	André (yellow card) 16'; Pedro Henrique (yellow card) 57'; Habibou 87'	Stadium: Stade Louis II; Attendance: 6,527; Referee: Olivier Thual

26 April 2015 34	Lens	0–3	Monaco	Amiens
17:00 CEST (UTC+02:00)	Lemoigne (yellow card) 18'; Valdivia (yellow card) 57'; El Jadeyaoui (yellow card) 69'	Report	Fabinho (yellow card) 24'; Carrasco 36'; Martial 44'; Silva 72'	Stadium: Stade de la Licorne; Attendance: 11,228; Referee: Bartolomeu Varela

2 May 2015 35	Monaco	4–1	Toulouse	Monaco
17:00 CEST (UTC+02:00)	Silva 9'; Kondogbia (yellow card) 43'; Raggi (yellow card) 44'; Martial 45+1' (pen.); Moutinho 56'; Dirar (red card) 80'; Germain 90+2'	Report	Braithwaite 26'; Kana-Biyik (red card) 80'	Stadium: Stade Louis II; Attendance: 7,006; Referee: Nicolas Rainville

10 May 2015 36	Marseille	2–1	Monaco	Marseille
21:00 CEST (UTC+02:00)	N'Koulou (yellow card) 27'; Romao (yellow card) 74'; Ayew 79'; Mendy (yellow card) 85'; Alessandrini 87'	Report	Moutinho 1'; R. Carvalho (yellow card) 70'; Raggi (yellow card) 72'	Stadium: Stade Vélodrome; Attendance: 62,471; Referee: Clément Turpin

16 May 2015 37	Monaco	2–0	Metz	Monaco
21:00 CEST (UTC+02:00)	Silva 45'; Germain 88'	Report	N'Daw (yellow card) 32'; Lejeune (yellow card) 52'; Ikaunieks (yellow card) 60'	Stadium: Stade Louis II; Attendance: 8,627; Referee: Amaury Delerue

23 May 2015 38	Lorient	0–1	Monaco	Lorient
21:00 CEST (UTC+02:00)	Ndong (yellow card) 23'; Ayew (yellow card) 71'	Report	Carrasco 20', (yellow card) 61'; Moutinho (yellow card) 61'; Subašić (yellow card) 90+1'	Stadium: Stade du Moustoir; Attendance: 15,844; Referee: Tony Chapron

=== Coupe de la Ligue ===
17 December 2014 Round of 16	Lyon	1–1 (a.e.t.) (4–5 p)	Monaco	Lyon
21:00 CET (UTC+1)	Bedimo (yellow card) 47'; Lacazette 105'	Report	Diallo (yellow card) 15'; Carrasco (yellow card) 86', (goal) 94'; Fabinho (yellow card) 120'	Stadium: Stade de Gerland; Attendance: 21,541; Referee: Antony Gautier
	Penalties
	Gonalons (penalty scored); Lacazette (penalty scored); Ghezzal (penalty scored); Koné (penalty missed); Umtiti (penalty scored); Ferri (penalty missed)		(penalty missed) Toulalan; (penalty scored) López; (penalty scored) Martial; (penalty scored) Fabinho; (penalty scored) Silva; (penalty scored) Ocampos

14 January 2015 Quarter-finals	Monaco	2–0	Guingamp	Monaco
21:00 CET (UTC+1)	Berbatov 8', (yellow card) 70'; Bakayoko (yellow card) 43'; Martial 90+4'	Report	Mandanne (red card) 36'; Sankharé (yellow card) 82'	Stadium: Stade Louis II; Attendance: 4,785; Referee: Nicolas Rainville

4 February 2015 Semi-finals	Monaco	0–0 (a.e.t.) (6–7 p)	Bastia	Monaco
21:00 CET (UTC+1)	Fabinho (yellow card) 48'; Dirar (yellow card) 92'	Report	Palmieri (yellow card) 92'; Romaric (yellow card) 119'	Stadium: Stade Louis II; Attendance: 7,500; Referee: Antony Gautier
	Penalties
	Martial (penalty scored); Silva (penalty missed); Fabinho (penalty scored); Kurzawa (penalty scored); João Moutinho (penalty missed); Toulalan (penalty scored); Traoré (penalty scored); Echiéjilé (penalty scored); Dirar (penalty missed)		(penalty scored) Boudebouz; (penalty missed) Gillet; (penalty missed) Sio; (penalty scored) Modesto; (penalty scored) Palmieri; (penalty scored) Marange; (penalty scored) Ongenda; (penalty scored) Cioni; (penalty scored) Squillaci

=== Coupe de France ===
4 January 2015 Round of 64	Nîmes	0–2	Monaco	Nîmes
14:15 CET (UTC+1)	Cordoval (yellow card) 39'; Marin (yellow card) 73'	Report	Silva 33'; Germain 90+4'	Stadium: Stade des Costières; Referee: Alexandre Castro

21 January 2015 Round of 32	Monaco	2–0	Evian	Monaco
17:00 CET (UTC+1)	Ocampos 63'; Martial 88'	Summary	N'Sikulu (yellow card) 56'	Stadium: Stade Louis II; Attendance: 800; Referee: Clement Turpin

10 February 2015 Round of 16	Monaco	3–1	Rennes	Monaco
12:00 CET (UTC+1)	Touré 9'; Wallace 11'; Abdennour (yellow card) 14'; Martial 67' (pen.)	Summary	Pedro Henrique 34'	Stadium: Stade Louis II; Attendance: 4,000; Referee: Tony Chapron

4 March 2015 Quarter-finals	Paris Saint-Germain	2–0	Monaco	Paris
21:00 CET (UTC+1)	David Luiz 3', (yellow card) 17'; Rabiot (yellow card) 35'; Cavani 52'	Report	M. Carvalho (yellow card) 11'; Toulalan (yellow card) 24'; Diallo (yellow card) 27'	Stadium: Parc des Princes; Attendance: 45,000; Referee: Clément Turpin

=== UEFA Champions League ===
==== Group stage ====
Pos	Team	Pld	W	D	L	GF	GA	GD	Pts	Qualification	MON	LEV	ZEN	BEN
1	(France) Monaco	6	3	2	1	4	1	+3	11	Advance to knockout phase	—	1–0	2–0	0–0
2	(Germany) Bayer Leverkusen	6	3	1	2	7	4	+3	10	Advance to knockout phase	0–1	—	2–0	3–1
3	(Russia) Zenit Saint Petersburg	6	2	1	3	4	6	−2	7	Transfer to Europa League	0–0	1–2	—	1–0
4	(Portugal) Benfica	6	1	2	3	2	6	−4	5		1–0	0–0	0–2	—

Source: UEFA
Rules for classification: Group stage tiebreakers

16 September 2014 1	Monaco (France)	1–0	(Germany) Bayer Leverkusen	Fontvieille, Monaco
20:45 CEST (UTC+2)	Carrasco (yellow card) 29'; Kurzawa (yellow card) 45+2'; Moutinho 61'	Report	Boenisch (yellow card) 65'; Spahić (yellow card) 74'	Stadium: Stade Louis II; Attendance: 8,130; Referee: Pavel Královec (Czech Republic); Man of the Match: Jérémy Toulalan (Monaco)

1 October 2014 2	Zenit Saint Petersburg (Russia)	0–0	(France) Monaco	Saint Petersburg, Russia
18:00 CEST (UTC+2)		Report	Toulalan (yellow card) 38'; Fabinho (yellow card) 81'; Dirar (yellow card) 83'	Stadium: Petrovsky Stadium; Attendance: 13,817; Referee: Mark Clattenburg (England); Man of the Match: Yury Lodygin (Zenit)

22 October 2014 3	Monaco (France)	0–0	(Portugal) Benfica	Fontvieille, Monaco
20:45 CEST (UTC+2)	R. Carvalho (yellow card) 71'; Kurzawa (yellow card) 78'; Carrasco (yellow card) 90+5'	Report	Eliseu (yellow card) 8'; López (yellow card) 26' (yellow-red card) 76'; Salvio (yellow card) 36'	Stadium: Stade Louis II; Attendance: 12,776; Referee: Szymon Marciniak (Poland); Man of the Match: Danijel Subašić (Monaco)

4 November 2014 4	Benfica (Portugal)	1–0	(France) Monaco	Lisbon, Portugal
20:45 CET (UTC+1)	Samaris (yellow card) 29'; Pérez (yellow card) 38'; Talisca 82'	Report	Traoré (yellow card) 26'; R. Carvalho (yellow card) 39'; Toulalan (yellow card) 56'; Moutinho (yellow card) 74'; Martial (yellow card) 86'	Stadium: Estádio da Luz; Attendance: 32,565; Referee: David Fernández Borbalán (Spain)

26 November 2014 5	Bayer Leverkusen (Germany)	0–1	(France) Monaco	Leverkusen, Germany
20:45 CET (UTC+1)	Spahić (yellow card) 26'	Report	R. Carvalho (yellow card) 42'; Ocampos 72'	Stadium: BayArena; Attendance: 26,230; Referee: Paolo Tagliavento (Italy); Man of the Match: Aymen Abdennour (Monaco)

9 December 2014 6	Monaco (France)	2–0	(Russia) Zenit Saint Petersburg	Fontvieille, Monaco
20:45 CET (UTC+1)	Raggi (yellow card) 26'; Abdennour 63'; Toulalan (yellow card) 81'; Fabinho 89'	Report	Lombaerts (yellow card) 10'; Fayzulin (yellow card) 62'	Stadium: Stade Louis II; Attendance: 11,319; Referee: Damir Skomina (Slovenia)

==== Knockout phase ====
===== Round of 16 =====
25 February 2015 First leg	Arsenal (England)	1–3	(France) Monaco	London, England
20:45 CET (UTC+1)	Coquelin (yellow card) 42'; Bellerín (yellow card) 74'; Özil (yellow card) 87'; Oxlade-Chamberlain 90+1'	Report	Kondogbia 38'; Echiéjilé (yellow card) 45'; Berbatov 53'; Moutinho (yellow card) 90+2'; Carrasco 90+4'	Stadium: Emirates Stadium; Attendance: 59,868; Referee: Deniz Aytekin (Germany)

17 March 2015 Second leg	Monaco (France)	0–2 (a3–3 agg.)	(England) Arsenal	Fontvieille, Monaco
20:45 CET (UTC+1)	Kondogbia (yellow card) 52'	Report	Giroud 36'; Sánchez (yellow card) 42'; Ramsey 79'	Stadium: Stade Louis II; Attendance: 17,263; Referee: Svein Oddvar Moen (Norway)

===== Quarter-finals =====
14 April 2015 First leg	Juventus (Italy)	1–0	(France) Monaco	Turin, Italy
20:45 CEST (UTC+02:00)	Vidal 57' (pen.)	Report	R. Carvalho (yellow card) 55'	Stadium: Juventus Stadium; Attendance: 40,801; Referee: Pavel Královec (Czech Republic)

22 April 2015 Second leg	Monaco (France)	0–0 (0–1 agg.)	(Italy) Juventus	Fontvieille, Monaco
20:45 CEST (UTC+02:00)	Silva (yellow card) 50'; Kondogbia (yellow card) 76'	Report	Chiellini (yellow card) 1'; Tevez (yellow card) 86'	Stadium: Stade Louis II; Attendance: 16,889; Referee: Willie Collum (Scotland)

== Statistics ==
=== Appearances and goals ===
As of match played 23 May 2015

No.	Pos	Nat	Player	Total		Ligue 1		Coupe de France		Coupe de la Ligue		UEFA Champions League	
No.	Pos	Nat	Player	Apps	Goals	Apps	Goals	Apps	Goals	Apps	Goals	Apps	Goals
1	GK	(Croatia) CRO	Danijel Subašić	47	0	37	0	0	0	0	0	10	0
2	DF	(Brazil) BRA	Fabinho	53	2	35+1	1	4	0	2+1	0	9+1	1
3	DF	(France) FRA	Layvin Kurzawa	39	0	25+2	0	0+2	0	1+1	0	7+1	0
5	DF	(Tunisia) TUN	Aymen Abdennour	27	1	18+1	0	1	0	1	0	6	1
6	DF	(Portugal) POR	Ricardo Carvalho	31	0	20+2	0	1	0	2	0	6	0
7	MF	(Morocco) MAR	Nabil Dirar	41	2	13+14	2	1+2	0	1+1	0	7+2	0
8	MF	(Portugal) POR	João Moutinho	52	5	35+2	4	2+1	0	2	0	10	1
9	FW	(Bulgaria) BUL	Dimitar Berbatov	38	9	18+8	7	1	0	2	1	7+2	1
12	FW	(Brazil) BRA	Matheus Carvalho	12	1	4+4	1	1+1	0	0	0	0+2	0
13	DF	(Brazil) BRA	Wallace	22	1	11+3	0	2	1	2	0	3+1	0
14	MF	(France) FRA	Tiémoué Bakayoko	18	0	10+2	0	1	0	2	0	2+1	0
15	MF	(Portugal) POR	Bernardo Silva	45	10	25+7	9	3	1	3	0	1+6	0
16	GK	(Netherlands) NED	Maarten Stekelenburg	8	0	1	0	4	0	3	0	0	0
17	MF	(Belgium) BEL	Yannick Carrasco	52	8	33+3	6	2+2	0	1+1	1	6+4	1
18	FW	(France) FRA	Valère Germain	37	5	9+20	4	1+1	1	3	0	0+3	0
19	FW	(Ivory Coast) CIV	Lacina Traoré	8	1	3+3	1	0	0	0	0	1+1	0
21	DF	(Nigeria) NGR	Elderson Echiéjilé	20	1	10+2	1	4	0	1	0	2+1	0
22	MF	(France) FRA	Geoffrey Kondogbia	33	2	22+1	1	1+1	0	0	0	8	1
23	FW	(France) FRA	Anthony Martial	48	12	18+17	9	2+1	2	1+2	1	4+3	0
24	DF	(Italy) ITA	Andrea Raggi	39	0	27	0	2	0	2	0	8	0
25	FW	(Burkina Faso) BFA	Alain Traoré	4	0	0+1	0	2	0	0+1	0	0	0
28	MF	(France) FRA	Jérémy Toulalan	42	0	28	0	4	0	2	0	8	0
29	MF	(France) FRA	Dylan Bahamboula	1	0	0	0	0+1	0	0	0	0	0
33	FW	(France) FRA	Aboubakar Kamara	2	0	0+2	0	0	0	0	0	0	0
34	DF	(France) FRA	Abdou Diallo	8	0	1+4	0	1	0	1+1	0	0	0
38	DF	(Mali) MLI	Almamy Touré	8	2	4+1	1	2	1	0	0	1	0
Players transferred out during the season
9	FW	(Colombia) COL	Radamel Falcao	3	2	1+2	2	0	0	0	0	0	0
11	MF	(Argentina) ARG	Lucas Ocampos	26	3	7+10	1	2	1	1	0	4+2	1
20	DF	(Spain) ESP	Borja López	1	0	0	0	0	0	0+1	0	0	0

=== Goal scorers ===
Place	Position	Nation	Number	Name	Ligue 1	Coupe de France	Coupe de la Ligue	UEFA Champions League	Total
1	FW	(France)	23	Anthony Martial	9	2	1	0	12
2	MF	(Portugal)	15	Bernardo Silva	9	1	0	0	10
3	FW	(Bulgaria)	9	Dimitar Berbatov	7	0	1	1	9
4	FW	(Belgium)	17	Yannick Carrasco	6	0	1	1	8
5	MF	(Portugal)	8	João Moutinho	4	0	0	1	5
5	FW	(France)	18	Valère Germain	4	1	0	0	5
7	MF	(Morocco)	7	Nabil Dirar	2	0	0	0	2
7	MF	(Argentina)	11	Lucas Ocampos	1	1	0	1	2
7	DF	(Mali)	38	Almamy Touré	1	1	0	0	2
7	MF	(France)	22	Geoffrey Kondogbia	1	0	0	1	2
7	DF	(Brazil)	2	Fabinho	1	0	0	1	2
12	FW	(Ivory Coast)	19	Lacina Traoré	1	0	0	0	1
12	DF	(Nigeria)	21	Elderson Echiéjilé	1	0	0	0	1
12	FW	(Brazil)	12	Matheus Carvalho	1	0	0	0	1
12	DF	(Brazil)	13	Wallace	0	1	0	0	1
12	DF	(Tunisia)	5	Aymen Abdennour	0	0	0	1	1
12				Own goal	1	0	0	0	1
				TOTALS	51	7	3	6	67

=== Disciplinary record ===
Number	Nation	Position	Name	Ligue 1		Coupe de France		Coupe de la Ligue		UEFA Champions League		Total	
Number	Nation	Position	Name	Yellow card	Red card	Yellow card	Red card	Yellow card	Red card	Yellow card	Red card	Yellow card	Red card
1	(Croatia)	GK	Danijel Subašić	4	0	0	0	0	0	0	0	4	0
2	(Brazil)	DF	Fabinho	4	0	0	0	2	0	1	0	7	0
3	(France)	DF	Layvin Kurzawa	1	0	0	0	0	0	2	0	3	0
5	(Tunisia)	DF	Aymen Abdennour	2	1	0	0	0	0	0	0	2	1
6	(Portugal)	DF	Ricardo Carvalho	4	1	0	0	0	0	4	0	8	1
7	(Morocco)	MF	Nabil Dirar	3	1	0	0	1	0	1	0	5	1
8	(Portugal)	MF	João Moutinho	6	0	0	0	0	0	2	0	8	0
10	(Bulgaria)	FW	Dimitar Berbatov	4	0	0	0	1	0	0	0	5	0
11	(Argentina)	MF	Lucas Ocampos	2	0	0	0	0	0	0	0	2	0
12	(Brazil)	FW	Matheus Carvalho	0	0	1	0	0	0	0	0	1	0
13	(Brazil)	DF	Wallace	1	1	0	0	0	0	0	0	1	1
14	(France)	MF	Tiémoué Bakayoko	5	1	1	0	1	0	0	0	7	1
15	(Portugal)	MF	Bernardo Silva	1	0	0	0	0	0	1	0	2	0
17	(Belgium)	MF	Yannick Carrasco	6	0	0	0	1	0	2	0	9	0
19	(Ivory Coast)	FW	Lacina Traoré	0	0	0	0	0	0	1	0	1	0
21	(Nigeria)	DF	Elderson Echiéjilé	1	0	0	0	0	0	1	0	2	0
22	(France)	MF	Geoffrey Kondogbia	3	0	0	0	0	0	2	0	5	0
23	(France)	FW	Anthony Martial	1	0	0	0	0	0	1	0	2	0
24	(Italy)	DF	Andrea Raggi	8	0	0	0	0	0	1	0	9	0
28	(France)	MF	Jérémy Toulalan	6	0	1	0	0	0	3	0	10	0
34	(France)	DF	Abdou Diallo	0	0	1	0	1	0	0	0	2	0
			TOTALS	62	5	4	0	7	0	22	0	95	5
