= Khaled Kehiha =

French-Algerian footballer (born 1986)

Personal information
- Full name: Khaled Kehiha
- Date of birth: 12 March 1986 (age 40)
- Place of birth: Istres, France
- Height: 1.81 m (5 ft 11 in)
- Position: Defender

Team information
- Current team: FC Istres
- Number: 13

Senior career*
Years	Team	Apps	(Gls)
2006–2010	Istres	39	(0)
2011–2012	UA Cognac	1	(0)
2012–2013	FCA Calvi	17	(0)
2013–	Istres	13	(0)
- * Club domestic league appearances and goals as of 00:00, 21 December 2014 (UTC)

Khaled Kehiha (born 12 March 1986) is a French-Algerian footballer. He currently plays as a defender for FC Istres in the French Ligue 2.

== Personal ==
Khaled's older brother Amor Kehiha is also a professional footballer and is currently playing for FC Istres as well.
