= Matheus Carvalho =

Brazilian footballer (born 1992)

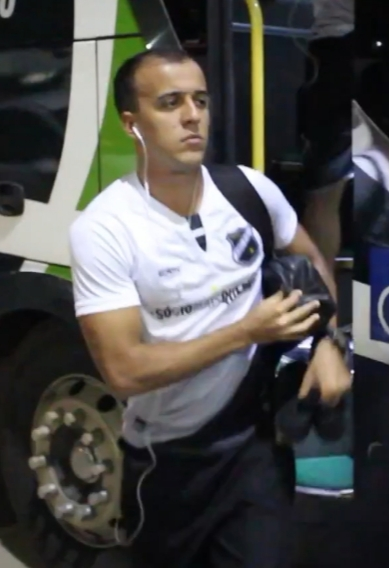
- Carvalho in 2018

Personal information
- Full name: Matheus Thiago de Carvalho
- Date of birth: 11 March 1992 (age 34)
- Place of birth: Niterói, Brazil
- Height: 1.77 m (5 ft 10 in)
- Position: Forward

Team information
- Current team: Barra FC

Youth career
- 2003–2011: Fluminense

Senior career*
Years	Team	Apps	(Gls)
2010–2015	Fluminense	23	(4)
2013	→ Joinville (loan)	18	(4)
2015	→ Monaco (loan)	12	(1)
2016	Fort Lauderdale Strikers	6	(1)
2016	Atlético Goianiense	3	(1)
2017	Paraná	17	(3)
2018	ABC	18	(3)
2019–2021	Náutico	43	(9)
2022–2023	Botafogo SP	28	(5)
2023	Náutico	17	(5)
2024–	Barra FC	9	(1)
- * Club domestic league appearances and goals as of 15:11, 5 March 2024

Matheus Thiago de Carvalho (born 11 March 1992), is a Brazilian footballer who plays as a forward for Barra FC.

== Career ==
On 31 January 2015, Carvalho moved on loan to Monaco till the end of the 2014–15 season, with an option for Monaco to make the deal permanent.

Carvalho signed with North American Soccer League club Fort Lauderdale Strikers on 8 February 2016.

== Honours ==
Fluminense

- Campeonato Brasileiro Série A: 2010
- Campeonato Brasileiro Série A: 2012
- Taça Guanabara: 2012
- Campeonato Carioca: 2012

Joinville

- Copa Santa Catarina: 2013

Atlético Clube Goianiense

- Campeonato Brasileiro Série B: 2016

Náutico

- Campeonato Brasileiro Série C: 2019
- Campeonato Pernambucano: 2021
