= Víctor Montaño =

Colombian footballer (born 1984)

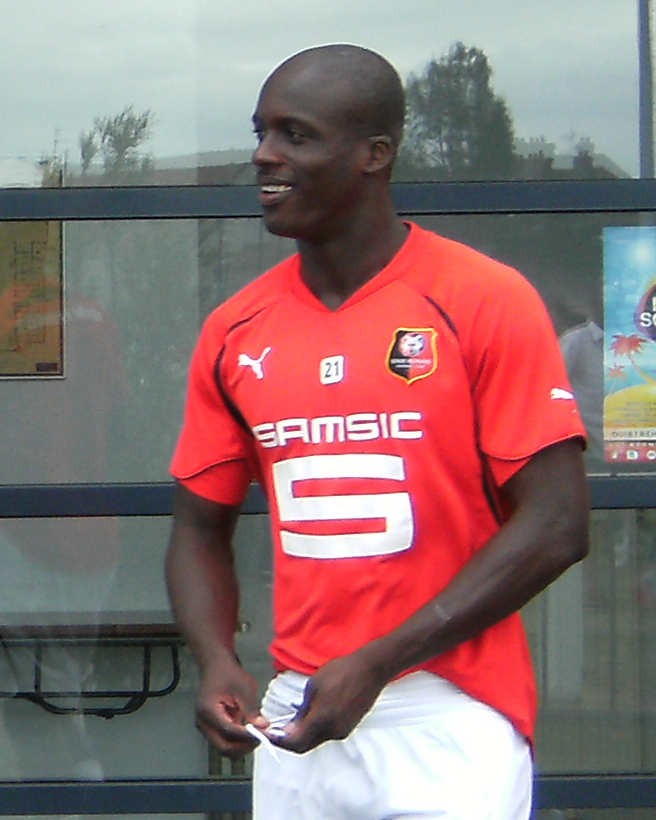
- Montaño with Rennes

Personal information
- Full name: Víctor Hugo Montaño Caicedo
- Date of birth: 1 May 1984 (age 42)
- Place of birth: Cali, Colombia
- Height: 1.77 m (5 ft 10 in)
- Position: Forward

Senior career*
Years	Team	Apps	(Gls)
2002–2004	Millonarios	44	(6)
2004–2005	Istres	33	(2)
2005–2010	Montpellier	159	(43)
2010–2013	Rennes	71	(16)
2013–2014	Montpellier	36	(5)
2015	Toluca	6	(0)
2016	Once Caldas	0	(0)
2017	Riffa SC		
2018	FAS	16	(3)
2019	Orsomarso	11	(2)

International career
2002–2003	Colombia U-20	14	(5)
2011	Colombia	1	(0)
- * Club domestic league appearances and goals

Víctor Hugo Montaño Caicedo (Spanish pronunciation: [ˈbiɣtoɾ moˈtaɲo]; born 1 May 1984) is a Colombian former professional footballer who played as a forward. He made one appearance for the Colombia national team in 2011.

== Club career ==
=== Early career ===
Although born in Cali, Montaño started his professional career at Bogotá side Millonarios as a teenager. He showed great promise in Colombia and at the age of 20, on 26 June 2004, secured a move to newly promoted Ligue 1 side FC Istres in a one-year deal. Montaño appeared in 33 Ligue 1 games in his first season in Europe and netted 2 goals, but was unable to prevent Istres from finishing last and returning to Ligue 2.

=== Montpellier ===
Following the club's relegation he was sold to fellow Ligue 2 side Montpellier. After playing with Montpellier for four seasons in Ligue 2, the club were promoted in 2009 after finishing two points behind champions RC Lens. During the promotion campaign, Montaño finished with 15 goals, three behind top scorer Grégory Thil, and also contributed with seven assists.

In the club's first season back in the French top flight, Montpellier finished in 5th spot on 69 points, just two points away from a Champions League spot. The other two promoted clubs, Le Mans and US Boulogne, fared much worse and immediately dropped back down to Ligue 2, with Montaño scoring goals against Boulogne. Montaño was a big part of Montpellier's success that campaign as he contributed with 11 goals, from 84 shots, and three assists. Included in this, was an impressive brace against Lille on 22 November 2009, that saw his side win 2–0, and a long range effort that helped his side to a dramatic 2–1 victory over Lyon on 23 December.

=== Stade Rennais ===
After a successful five-year spell at Montpellier, Montaño joined Rennes in summer 2010. He signed a four-year deal with the club and was brought in following the departure of Jimmy Briand to Lyon. The transfer fee paid to Montpellier was reported as €6 million. He made his debut for the club on 14 August 2010, the opening day of the Ligue 1 season against AS Nancy. He made an immediate impact, scoring the opening goal and providing an assist for Yacine Brahimi, as his side eventually won 3–0. On 9 January 2011 Montano scored his first brace for the club, coming in a 7–0 thrashing of Championnat National side AS Cannes.

Following a horrendous 5–1 loss to Sochaux on 29 January 2011, Rennes pulled off five straight Ligue 1 victories to go temporarily top of the table on 5 March 2011. Montaño was very instrumental in this run, scoring three goals in three straight games. The first goal of this run came on 13 February against relegation threatened Nice, scoring the winning goal in a 2–0 victory. He followed this up seven days later, converting an 88th-minute penalty to see off Toulouse and send his club up to second spot. On 26 February, Rennes played host to RC Lens, with Abdoulrazak Boukari and Montaño scoring to send Rennes above Lille in the league table. Following this game, Montano was only able to find the net two more times for the rest of the campaign. He scored one and assisted Jérôme Leroy for the winner against AS Saint-Étienne on 15 May 2011, and also found the back of the net against champions Lille on 29 May. Rennes eventually ran out of steam, finishing in sixth spot, but did secure a UEFA Europa League play-off spot. Montaño finished his first season with the Brittany club as an important part of the offense. He started in 31 Ligue 1 fixtures, netting nine goals and adding four assists.

His second season in Brittany started much like his first. In the second leg of their third qualifying round match against Georgian side FC Metalurgi Rustavi, Montaño scored in the 75th minute and Julien Féret added another ten minutes later, as the French side ran out 7–2 aggregate winners. The start of the league campaign was impressive for Rennes as well, Montano scored one and assisted another on the opening day of the new Ligue 1 season. This time it came against newly promoted Dijon and his side won 5–1.

On 18 August 2011, Montaño scored the winning goal of their first leg Europa League play-off tie against Red Star Belgrade in Serbia. His 75th-minute strike put Stade Rennais in control of the tie and favorites to advance to the group stages. In the second leg Montaño opened the scoring in the 10th minute and was later substituted by Stephane Dalmat, as Rennes won 4–0, 6–1 on aggregate. On 18 September Montano put his side 1–0 up in the 19th minute against AS Nancy-Lorraine after being fed in by strike partner Jonathan Pitroipa, the match ended in a 1–1 draw.

In the final game of the season on 20 May 2012, Montaño opened the scoring in the ninth minute as Rennes went on to secure a 5–0 defeat of relegated club Dijon.

=== Return to Montpellier ===
On 7 August 2013, Montpellier re-signed Montaño from fellow Ligue 1 club Rennes.

=== FAS ===
Montaño signed with C.D. FAS of the Salvadoran Primera División for the Apertura 2018 tournament. In December 2018, Montaño's contract was not renewed by FAS. On 29 December 2018, Montaño was on trial with C.D. Municipal Limeño.

=== Orsomarso ===
In January 2019, Montaño signed with Orsomarso in Colombia.

== International career ==
Montaño played with the Colombia U20 national team at the 2003 FIFA World Youth Championship in the United Arab Emirates, helping Colombia finish third by winning against Argentina 2–1.

In 2011, he made one appearance for the Colombia national team.
