= Bernardo Silva =

Portuguese footballer (born 1994)

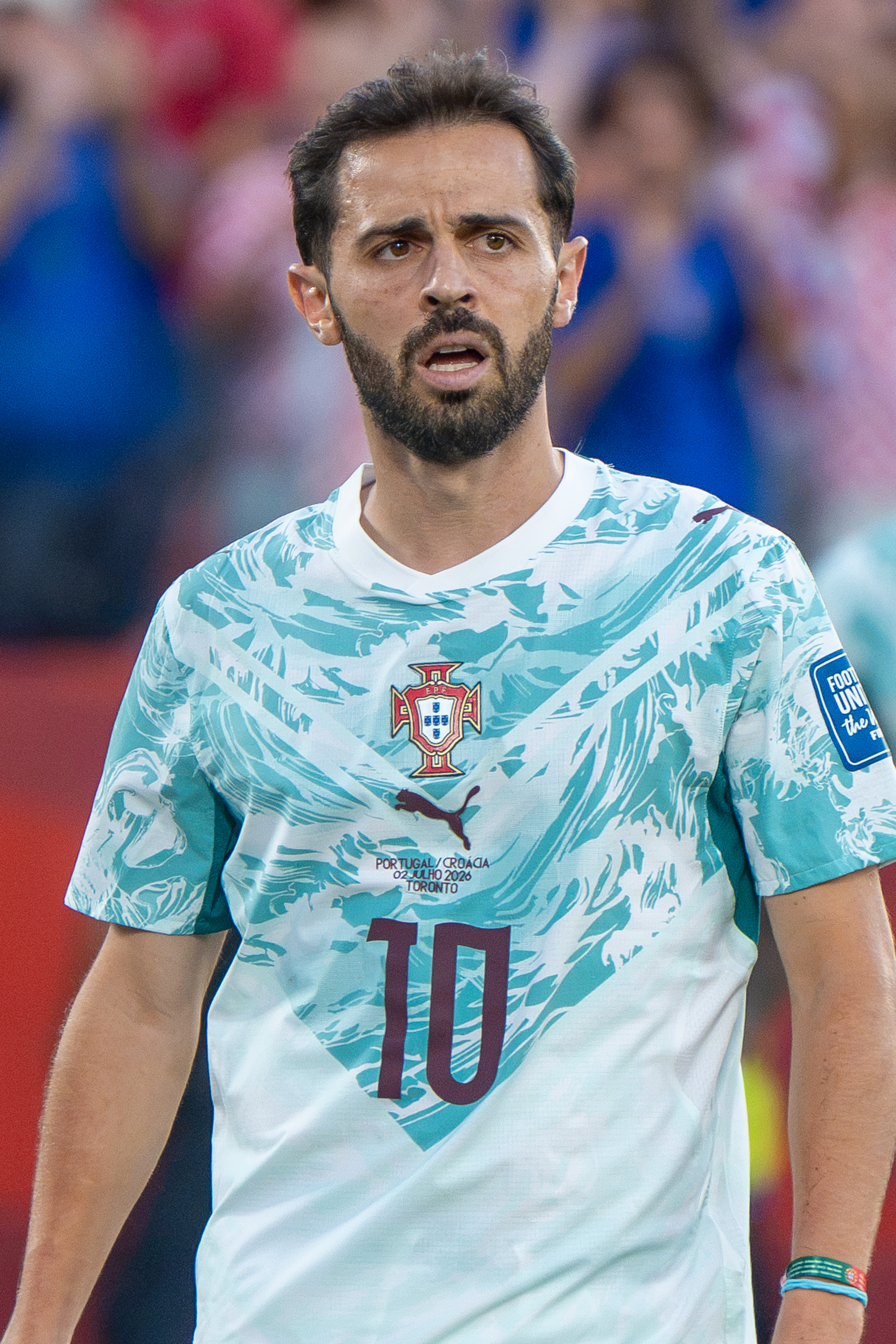
- Silva with Portugal in 2026

Personal information
- Full name: Bernardo Mota Veiga de Carvalho e Silva
- Date of birth: 10 August 1994 (age 32)
- Place of birth: Lisbon, Portugal
- Height: 1.73 m (5 ft 8 in)
- Position: Midfielder

Team information
- Current team: Real Madrid
- Number: 20

Youth career
- 2002–2013: Benfica

Senior career*
Years	Team	Apps	(Gls)
2013–2015	Benfica B	38	(7)
2013–2015	Benfica	1	(0)
2014–2015	→ Monaco (loan)	15	(2)
2015–2017	Monaco	86	(22)
2017–2026	Manchester City	304	(45)
2026–	Real Madrid	11	(0)

International career^{‡}
2012–2013	Portugal U19	13	(2)
2013–2015	Portugal U21	14	(6)
2015–	Portugal	116	(15)
Medal record
Men's football
Representing Portugal
UEFA Nations League
Winner	2019 Portugal
Winner	2025 Germany
FIFA Confederations Cup
Third place	2017 Russia
UEFA European Under-21 Championship
Runner-up	2015 Czech Republic
- * Club domestic league appearances and goals as of 22:06, 21 November 2026 (UTC) ‡ National team caps and goals as of 22:38, 14 November 2026 (UTC)

Bernardo Mota Veiga de Carvalho e Silva (Note: Portuguese pronunciation: [bɨɾˈnaɾðu ˈsilvɐ]) (born 10 August 1994) is a Portuguese professional footballer who plays as a midfielder for La Liga club Real Madrid and captains the Portugal national team.

After spending most of his youth career at Benfica, Silva began his professional senior career with them, before moving to Monaco permanently in January 2015, winning the Ligue 1 title for the 2016–17 season. In the summer of 2017, Silva joined Manchester City. Across nine years with the club, he made over 450 appearances, winning 20 major honours, including six Premier League titles, three FA Cups, four EFL Cups, and the Champions League in 2023, as part of City's continental treble that year. In 2017–18, he helped City becoming the only Premier League team to attain 100 points in a single league season. In 2018–19, Silva had a significant role in City becoming the first men's team in England to win a domestic treble, being named Manchester City's Player of the Year in 2019 and being part of the PFA Premier League Team of the Year. In 2020–21, he helped Manchester City reach their first UEFA Champions League final, and was an integral part of the side who sealed their first ever continental treble in 2022–23, their most successful season to date. In July 2026, he left Manchester City as a free agent and joined La Liga club Real Madrid.

Silva made his senior debut for Portugal in 2015 after previously being capped by the nations's youth teams at under-19 and under-21 levels. He was chosen in Portugal's squads for three FIFA World Cups (2018, 2022 and 2026), two UEFA European Championships (2020 and 2024), and the 2017 FIFA Confederations Cup. He also won the UEFA Nations League in 2019 and 2025, being named as the Player of the Tournament on home soil in the former.

== Early life ==
Bernardo Mota Veiga de Carvalho e Silva was born on 10 August 1994, in Lisbon, Portugal. Silva's football journey started in Lisbon, where his early passion for the game was nurtured.

== Club career ==
=== Benfica ===
A product of Benfica's youth system, Silva played for its ranks, and in 2013 they won the 2012–13 Portuguese Juniors Championship. He made his debut for Benfica B in a Segunda Liga match against Trofense on 10 August 2013 (Matchday 1).

On 19 October 2013, Silva made his debut for Benfica at the age of 19, in a 2013–14 Taça de Portugal third round 1–0 away victory against Campeonato Nacional de Seniores club C.D. Cinfães, coming out of the bench in the 80th minute. His good performance for Benfica B in the 2013–14 Segunda Liga earned him the league's Breakthrough Player of the Year award. He was a member of Benfica's domestic treble-winning team of the 2013–14 season, playing only 31 minutes in a total of three matches.

=== Monaco ===
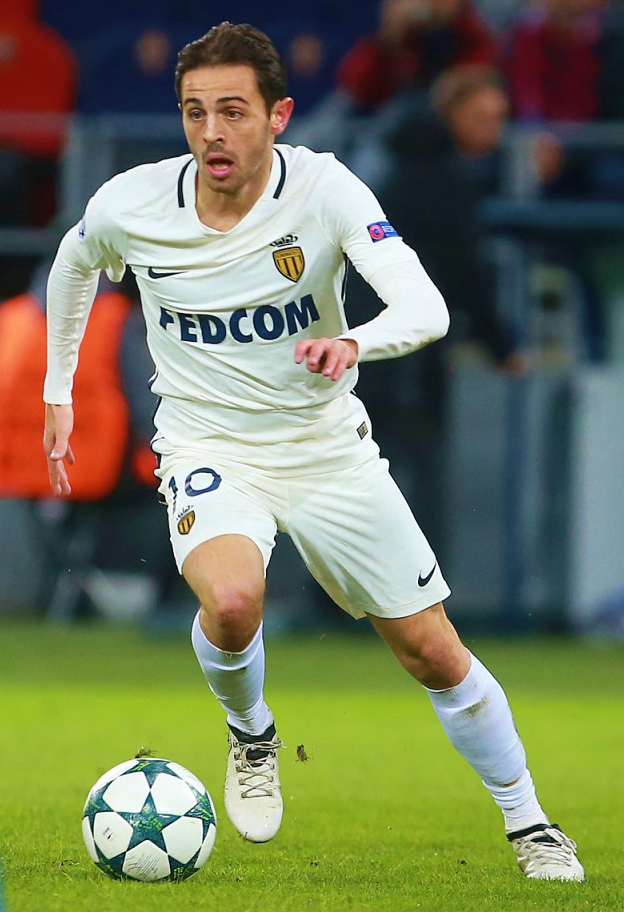
Silva playing for Monaco in the Champions League in 2016

On 7 August 2014, Silva joined Monaco on one-year loan deal. He made his debut on 17 August in a Ligue 1 away match against Bordeaux, replacing Lucas Ocampos in the second half. On 21 September, he made his first start, in a 1–0 home win against Guingamp. On 14 December, he scored the only goal of a home win against Marseille.

On 20 January 2015, Benfica announced that Silva's economic and sports rights had been sold to Monaco for €15.75 million; he signed a contract for Monaco that would expire on 30 June 2019. On 10 April, he scored twice in a 3–0 away win against Caen. On 10 August 2015, Silva extended his contract by one year, tying him to the club until June 2020.

In the 2016–17 Champions League group stage away match against CSKA Moscow on 18 October 2016, Silva scored Monaco's equaliser in the 87th minute to ensure that the match finished in 1–1 draw. On 15 January 2017, he scored Monaco's last two goals in a 4–1 away win over Marseille to help Monaco move to the top of the Ligue 1 table for the first time since Week 5 of the current Ligue 1 season. The following 29 January, Silva scored an added-time equaliser in the 1–1 draw against reigning league champions Paris Saint-Germain at the Parc des Princes, putting his team on top of the league. He finished the 2016–17 season with 8 goals and 9 assists in the league and 11 goals and 12 assists in 58 matches across all competitions.

=== Manchester City ===
==== 2017–2021: Domestic success and European final ====
The calibre of his performances against Manchester City for Monaco in the UEFA Champions League knockout legs in the 2016–17 season was noted by City manager Pep Guardiola and his backroom staff. On 26 May 2017, Manchester City confirmed the signing of Silva on a five-year contract after passing his medical tests. Although the transfer fee remains undisclosed, it has been reported to amount to €50 million (£43.5 million), which could reach €70 million with add-ons. Silva officially joined the club on 1 July, ahead of the 2017–18 season.

On 13 February 2018, Silva scored his first Champions League goal for the City in a 4–0 away victory against Basel in the first leg of the round of 16 stage. On 5 March, Silva scored the solitary winning goal against Chelsea at home – a key win which put them only three wins away from winning the Premier League title. He established himself as a consistent performer, playing the most matches of any City player in the season up to the end of February 2018. By the end of the season, he had played for Manchester City 53 times in all competitions – the most of any City player that season and helped them to a record 100 points in the Premier League and the EFL Cup.

Silva made 51 appearances for Manchester City during the 2018–19 season, scoring 13 goals and adding 14 assists in all competitions. On 24 April 2019, Silva scored the opening goal for City against Manchester United in the Manchester Derby, and the 2–0 win at Old Trafford put his team on top of the league. Silva's consistent and influential performances helped his team to win Premier League title, filling in Kevin De Bruyne's position who missed the majority of the season with an injury. As a result, he was voted into the PFA Team of the Year alongside four other City players and won the Manchester City Player of the Season award, voted by the fans.

In the 2019–20 season, Silva scored a hat-trick in an 8–0 thrashing of Watford in the Premier League on 21 September. Days later, the FA requested a response from Manchester City after Silva directed a tweet towards his teammate Benjamin Mendy which likened the player's appearance to that of a dark-skinned advertising mascot, while Kick It Out, the campaign group against racism in football, expressed their disappointment at Silva's use of a racist stereotype. Mendy said that he was not offended by the tweet. In November, Silva was banned for one match and fined £50,000 for the tweet. The FA said that Silva did not intend the post to be insulting or in any way racist. In October 2019, Silva was nominated as one among 30 candidates for Ballon d´Or.

On 10 January 2021, Silva scored a brace in a 3–0 home win over Championship side Birmingham City in the Third round of the FA Cup. On 20 January, Silva scored his first league goal of the season in a 2–0 home win over Aston Villa. On 24 February, Silva scored his first Champions League goal of the season in a 2–0 away win over Borussia Mönchengladbach in the first leg of the round of 16 tie.

==== 2021–2024: Consecutive Premier League titles and continental treble ====
In the start of the 2021–22 season, Manchester City manager Pep Guardiola revealed that Silva was one of three players that wanted to leave the club in the summer transfer window. It was reported that he was unsatisfied at Manchester, with Spanish La Liga side Atlético Madrid and Italian Serie A side Milan being interested in signing him. After staying at the club in the transfer window, Silva began displaying impressive performances in the midfield for Manchester City, most notably in the 5–0 victory against Arsenal, scoring the only goal in a 1–0 win over Leicester City, and against Liverpool and Chelsea, being named man of the match in the latter, with manager Pep Guardiola describing Silva as "one of the best players in the world". For his performances, Silva was awarded Manchester City's Player of the Month by the club's supporters for two consecutive months in September and October.

On 6 November, in the Manchester derby, Silva scored City's second goal in a 2–0 victory against Manchester United at Old Trafford. On 24 November, Silva became the first player in the Champions League to register a 100% passing rate, being named man of the match, as he provided an assist for Gabriel Jesus, in City's 2–1 home win against Paris Saint-Germain in a Champions League group stage match, to ensure his team qualification to the round of sixteen. For his performances, Silva was named Manchester City's Player of the Month for November, becoming the first player to win the award in three consecutive months.

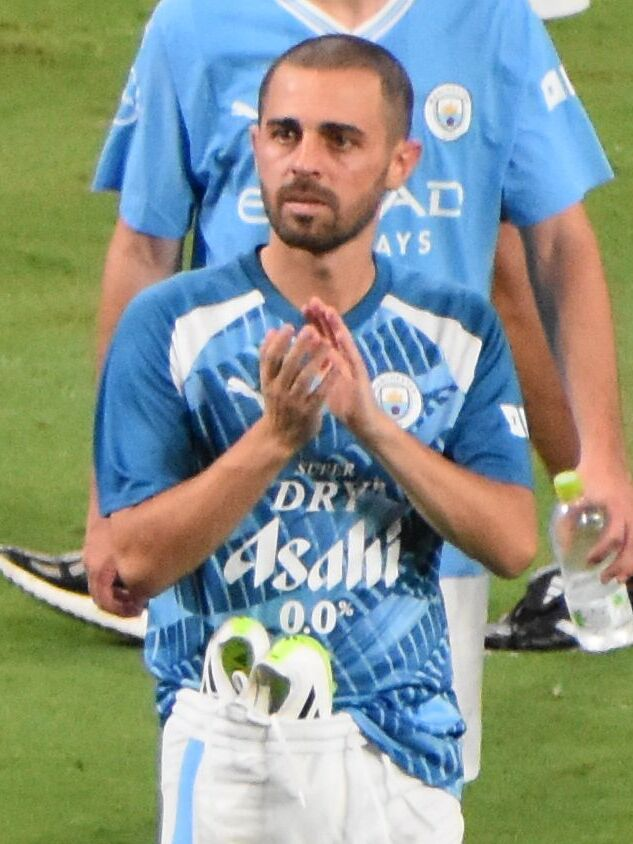
Silva with Manchester City in 2023

On 15 February 2022, Silva scored a brace and provided an assist in a 5–0 away win over Sporting CP in the first leg of the Champions League round of 16 tie, being named man of the match for the second match in a row. Having spent the majority of his first four seasons in Manchester providing width on the right, he was transformed into the ultimate utility player over the course of this season. Though functionally a central midfielder, he has spent time at both centre forward (he scored from there against Manchester United) and defensive midfield. He ended the season with 13 goals and 7 assists in all competitions.

On 17 May 2023, Silva scored a brace in a 4–0 win over Real Madrid in the Champions League semi-final second leg, which secured his club's qualification to the second Champions League final in their history. On 10 June, he provided a crucial assist to Rodri, who scored the match-winning sole goal in the Champions League final against Inter Milan, securing Manchester City's win for their first ever Champions League trophy and completing a continental treble. He was selected in the 2022–23 UEFA Champions League team of the tournament. On 23 August, Silva extended his contract with City until 2026.

On 29 October, Silva was lauded for his role in a dominant 3–0 victory against Manchester United in the Premier League. On 20 April 2024, he scored City's winner in the 84th minute in a 1–0 victory against Chelsea in their FA Cup semi-final.

==== 2024–2026: Captaincy and departure ====
He was appointed as Manchester City's new captain ahead of the 2025–26 season, following the departure of Kevin De Bruyne at the end of the previous season. Later that year, on 5 November, he reached his 100th Champions League appearance in a 4–1 victory over Borussia Dortmund.

On 5 April 2026, Manchester City assistant manager Pep Lijnders announced that Silva would leave the club in the summer when his contract expired. Later that month, on 16 April, it was confirmed that he would leave the club as a free agent at the end of the season.

Silva made his final appearance for Manchester City on 24 May, captaining the side in a 2–1 defeat to Aston Villa on the final day of the Premier League season. He departed the club after nine years, during which he became one of the defining players of the Pep Guardiola era, winning multiple major honours including six Premier League titles and the UEFA Champions League in 2023. Silva received a farewell from supporters, teammates and coaching staff, ending his City career with more than 450 appearances across all competitions.

=== Real Madrid ===
On 17 June 2026, Silva moved to Spain and signed for La Liga club Real Madrid on a two-year contract. He made his debut on 22 August, in a 2–1 win over Espanyol.

== International career ==
=== 2013–2018: Youth level and first international tournaments ===
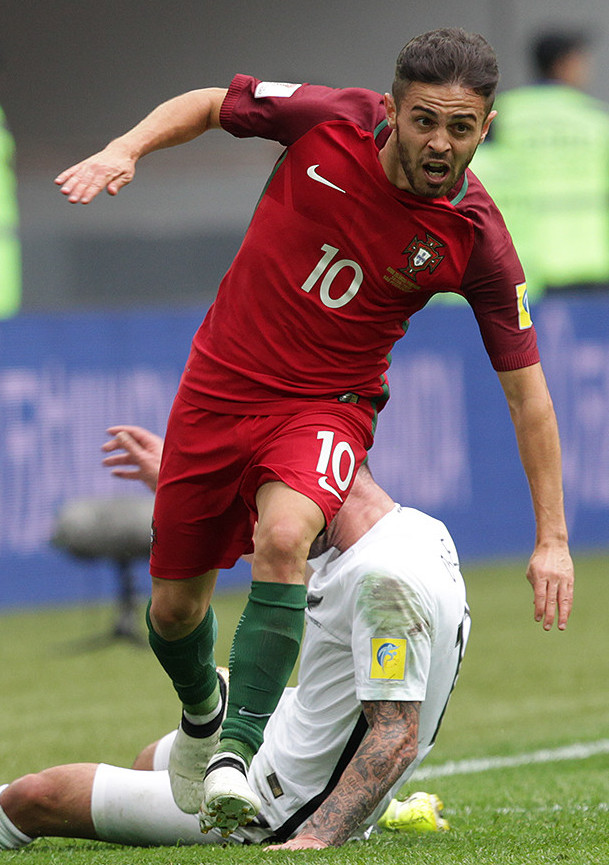
Silva playing for Portugal at the 2017 Confederations Cup

In 2013, Silva represented Portugal at the 2013 European Under-19 Championship, reaching the semi-finals. For his performances, he was named among the top 10 talents under the age of 19 in Europe by a selection of UEFA reporters. On 31 March 2015, Silva made his senior debut for Portugal, starting in a 0–2 friendly defeat to Cape Verde in Estoril. On 27 June 2015, Silva scored Portugal U21s' first goal in a 5–0 win against Germany U21 in the semi-finals of the European Under-21 Championship in Czech Republic. He was left out of the Portuguese squad for the finals of Euro 2016 due to injury. Silva was selected for the Portugal squad for the 2017 Confederations Cup which was hosted in Russia. He scored the second goal of the match in the group stage of the tournament, a 4–0 win over New Zealand. The national team reached the semi-finals before losing out to Chile in a penalty shootout after a 0–0 draw at the end of regulation time. He missed the third place play-off in which Portugal defeated Mexico 2–1 after extra time.

Silva was named in Portugal's 23-man squad for the 2018 World Cup in Russia. He featured in all 4 matches with Portugal, but was knocked out of the tournament after a 2–1 loss to Uruguay.

=== 2018–present: Nations League titles and tournament struggles ===
Silva was selected for three matches in the 2018–19 UEFA Nations League group stage, scoring a goal and providing an assist in a 3–2 victory against Poland on 11 October. Portugal topped their Nations League Group and qualified for the UEFA Nations League Finals held in Portugal. In the semi-finals on 5 June 2019, Silva provided two assists to Cristiano Ronaldo, who scored a hat-trick resulting in a 3–1 over Switzerland to reach the final. In the final of the tournament four days later, he provided a crucial assist to Gonçalo Guedes, who scored the match-winning sole goal at the Estádio do Dragão against the Netherlands, with Portugal winning the trophy on home soil, as he went on to be named the tournament's best player.

Silva continued his fine form throughout the qualifying process for UEFA Euro 2020, finishing the qualifying campaign, with three goals and six assists, including a brace of assists in a 6–0 over Lithuania. He would be named in Portugal's final squad for the delayed final tournament, appearing in all games of the eventual round of 16-exit to Belgium.

In October 2022, Silva was named in Portugal's preliminary 55-man squad for the 2022 FIFA World Cup in Qatar, being included in the final 26-man squad for the tournament. He appeared in all of Portugal's matches in the tournament in an eventual quarter-final exit to Morocco after losing 1–0.

Despite an underwhelming World Cup tournament, his form improved under new manager Roberto Martínez, who used Silva as one of his pilar for his team. He would finish the UEFA Euro 2024 qualifiers campaign with three goals and four assists, including captaining Portugal for the first time on 11 September 2023, in a 9–0 home defeat of Luxembourg in the same phase, their biggest win in international history.

On 21 May 2024, he was selected in the 26-man squad for the UEFA Euro 2024. On 22 June, Silva scored his first goal in a major tournament for Portugal, being awarded player of the match, as he scored the first goal in a 3–0 win against Turkey, securing his country's qualification to the knockout phase. In Portugal's round of 16 match against Slovenia, he played the full 120 minutes and scored the team's third kick of the penalty shootout which they won 3–0. Portugal were eliminated in the quarter-finals to France after losing 5–3 in another penalty shootout, despite scoring his side's second spot kick.

On 23 March 2025, Silva featured in his 100th international match for Portugal against Denmark during the Nations League quarter-finals, which ended in a 5–2 victory after extra time. After being selected for Portugal's squad for the finals, he and his team would go on to win the tournament 5–3 in a penalty shootout over rivals Spain.

On 19 May 2026, Silva was selected in the 26-man squad for the 2026 FIFA World Cup.

Following Cristiano Ronaldo’s retirement from international football in November 2026, Silva was appointed as the permanent captain of the national team under head coach Jorge Jesus.

== Style of play ==
Silva is a diminutive, elegant, and creative left-footed playmaker, with a slender build, who is capable of playing in several attacking and midfield positions. Throughout his career, he has been fielded in a variety of roles, including as a winger on either flank (although he favours the right side of the pitch), as a central midfielder, as a deep-lying playmaker, as an attacking midfielder, or even as a second striker; he has also been deployed in a false 9 role, or even as wing-back on occasion. He is mainly known for his technique, acceleration, agility, passing, ball control, vision, creativity, and dribbling skills, as well as his energy and defensive work-rate, which enables him to cover ground, press opponents, and start attacks after winning back possession. Although he is known for his ability to carry the ball forward, run at defences, and retain possession, he is also known to be an intelligent team player, with a strong personality, who prefers to participate in the build-up of offensive plays rather than undertaking individual dribbling runs. Despite primarily being a creative midfielder, he is also capable of scoring goals himself.

== Personal life ==
Silva's English has been described as "perfect" by the media, partly as a result of his parents sending him to an English-speaking school in Lisbon when he was six years old. In addition to English and his native Portuguese, Silva speaks French and Spanish. His cousin Matilde Fidalgo, also born in 1994, has represented Portugal and Manchester City's women's teams. Silva has a French Bulldog named John after the footballer John Stones. Silva is a supporter of Portuguese club Benfica. On 1 July 2023, he married his fiancée Inês Tomaz.

== Career statistics ==
=== Club ===
As of match played 21 November 2026

Appearances and goals by club, season and competition
Club	Season	League			National cup (Note: Includes Taça de Portugal, Coupe de France, FA Cup, Copa del Rey)		League cup (Note: Includes Taça da Liga, Coupe de la Ligue, EFL Cup)		Europe		Other		Total	
Club	Season	Division	Apps	Goals	Apps	Goals	Apps	Goals	Apps	Goals	Apps	Goals	Apps	Goals
Benfica B	2013–14	Segunda Liga	38	7	—		—		—		—		38	7
Benfica	2013–14	Primeira Liga	1	0	1	0	1	0	0	0	—		3	0
Monaco (loan)	2014–15	Ligue 1	15	2	1	1	2	0	3 (Note: Appearances in UEFA Champions League)	0	—		21	3
Monaco	2014–15	Ligue 1	17	7	2	0	1	0	4	0	—		24	7
Monaco	2015–16	Ligue 1	32	7	3	0	1	0	8 (Note: Two appearances in UEFA Champions League, six appearances in UEFA Europa League)	0	—		44	7
Monaco	2016–17	Ligue 1	37	8	3	0	3	0	15	3	—		58	11
Monaco	Monaco total		101	24	9	1	7	0	30	3	—		147	28
Manchester City	2017–18	Premier League	35	6	3	1	6	1	9	1	—		53	9
Manchester City	2018–19	Premier League	36	7	4	2	2	0	8	4	1 (Note: Appearance in FA Community Shield)	0	51	13
Manchester City	2019–20	Premier League	34	6	4	1	6	1	7	0	1	0	52	8
Manchester City	2020–21	Premier League	26	2	3	2	3	0	13	1	—		45	5
Manchester City	2021–22	Premier League	35	8	3	2	0	0	11	3	1	0	50	13
Manchester City	2022–23	Premier League	34	4	5	0	2	0	13	3	1	0	55	7
Manchester City	2023–24	Premier League	33	6	5	3	0	0	8	2	3 (Note: One appearance in FA Community Shield, two appearances and one goal in FIFA Club World Cup)	1	49	12
Manchester City	2024–25	Premier League	33	4	5	0	1	0	9	0	4 (Note: One appearance and one goal in FA Community Shield, three appearances and one goal in FIFA Club World Cup)	2	52	6
Manchester City	2025–26	Premier League	38	2	4	0	3	0	8	1	—		53	3
Manchester City	Total		304	45	36	11	23	2	86	15	11	3	460	76
Real Madrid	2026–27	La Liga	11	0	0	0	—		3	1	0	0	14	1
Career total			455	76	46	12	31	2	119	19	11	3	662	112

=== International ===
As of match played 14 November 2026

Appearances and goals by national team and year
National team	Year	Apps	Goals
Portugal	2015	5	0
Portugal	2016	4	1
Portugal	2017	12	1
Portugal	2018	12	1
Portugal	2019	10	3
Portugal	2020	8	1
Portugal	2021	13	1
Portugal	2022	14	0
Portugal	2023	9	3
Portugal	2024	11	2
Portugal	2025	9	1
Portugal	2026	9	1
Total		116	15

As of match played 14 November 2026
Portugal score listed first, score column indicates score after each Silva goal

List of international goals scored by Bernardo Silva
No.	Date	Venue	Cap	Opponent	Score	Result	Competition
1	1 September 2016	Estádio do Bessa, Porto, Portugal	7	Gibraltar	4–0	5–0	Friendly
2	24 June 2017	Krestovsky Stadium, Saint Petersburg, Russia	14	New Zealand	2–0	4–0	2017 FIFA Confederations Cup
3	11 October 2018	Silesian Stadium, Chorzów, Poland	32	Poland	3–1	3–2	2018–19 UEFA Nations League A
4	7 September 2019	Red Star Stadium, Belgrade, Serbia	38	Serbia	4–2	4–2	UEFA Euro 2020 qualifying
5	11 October 2019	Estádio José Alvalade, Lisbon, Portugal	40	Luxembourg	1–0	3–0	UEFA Euro 2020 qualifying
6	14 November 2019	Estádio Algarve, Faro, Portugal	42	Lithuania	5–0	6–0	UEFA Euro 2020 qualifying
7	14 October 2020	Estádio José Alvalade, Lisbon, Portugal	48	Sweden	1–0	3–0	2020–21 UEFA Nations League A
8	7 September 2021	Olympic Stadium, Baku, Azerbaijan	61	Azerbaijan	1–0	3–0	2022 FIFA World Cup qualification
9	23 March 2023	Estádio José Alvalade, Lisbon, Portugal	79	Liechtenstein	2–0	4–0	UEFA Euro 2024 qualifying
10	26 March 2023	Stade de Luxembourg, Luxembourg City, Luxembourg	80	Luxembourg	4–0	6–0	UEFA Euro 2024 qualifying
11	17 June 2023	Estadio da Luz, Lisbon, Portugal	81	Bosnia and Herzegovina	1–0	3–0	UEFA Euro 2024 qualifying
12	22 June 2024	Westfalenstadion, Dortmund, Germany	91	Turkey	1–0	3–0	UEFA Euro 2024
13	12 October 2024	Stadion Narodowy, Warsaw, Poland	96	Poland	1–0	3–1	2024–25 UEFA Nations League A
14	9 September 2025	Puskás Aréna, Budapest, Hungary	103	Hungary	1–1	3–2	2026 FIFA World Cup qualification
15	14 November 2026	Estádio Municipal de Braga, Braga, Portugal	116	Denmark	1–4	1–4	2026–27 UEFA Nations League A

== Honours ==
Benfica

- Primeira Liga: 2013–14
- Taça de Portugal: 2013–14
- Taça da Liga: 2013–14

Monaco

- Ligue 1: 2016–17

Manchester City

- Premier League: 2017–18, 2018–19, 2020–21, 2021–22, 2022–23, 2023–24
- FA Cup: 2018–19, 2022–23, 2025–26
- EFL Cup: 2017–18, 2018–19, 2019–20, 2020–21, 2025–26
- FA Community Shield: 2018, 2019, 2024
- UEFA Champions League: 2022–23
- FIFA Club World Cup: 2023

Portugal U21

- UEFA European Under-21 Championship runner-up: 2015

Portugal

- UEFA Nations League: 2018–19, 2024–25
- FIFA Confederations Cup third place: 2017

Individual

- Segunda Liga Breakthrough Player of the Year: 2013–14
- SJPF Segunda Liga Player of the Month: October 2013, December 2013 & January 2014
- UEFA European Under-19 Championship Team of the Tournament: 2013
- UEFA European Under-21 Championship Team of the Tournament: 2015
- UNFP Ligue 1 Player of the Month: January 2017
- UNFP Ligue 1 Team of the Year: 2016–17
- PFA Team of the Year: 2018–19 Premier League, 2021–22 Premier League
- Manchester City Player of the Year: 2018–19
- Manchester City Goal of the Season: 2022
- Alan Hardaker Trophy: 2019
- UEFA Nations League Finals Player of the Tournament: 2019
- UEFA Nations League Finals Team of the Tournament: 2019
- IFFHS Men's World Team: 2019
- ESM Team of the Year: 2021–22
- UEFA Champions League Team of the Season: 2022–23
- FIFA FIFPro World XI: 2023

== See also ==
- List of men's footballers with 100 or more international caps
