= Azzeddine Ourahou =

Moroccan footballer (born 1984)

Personal information
- Date of birth: 12 August 1984 (age 42)
- Place of birth: Morocco
- Height: 1.75 m (5 ft 9 in)
- Position: Midfielder

Team information
- Current team: FC Istres

Senior career*
Years	Team	Apps	(Gls)
- FC Istres

International career
2004–	Morocco		
- * Club domestic league appearances and goals

Azzeddine Ourahou (born 12 August 1984) is a Moroccan footballer.

Ourahou played for Nîmes Olympique and FC Istres in France's Ligue 1 and Ligue 2.

He was part of the Moroccan 2004 Olympic football team, which was eliminated in the first round, finishing third in group D, behind group winners Iraq and runners-up Costa Rica.
