= Christophe Dumolin =

French footballer (born 1973)

Personal information
- Date of birth: January 4, 1973 (age 53)
- Place of birth: Lyon, France
- Height: 1.70 m (5 ft 7 in)
- Position: Defender

Senior career*
Years	Team	Apps	(Gls)
1992–1994	Grenoble	49	(8)
1994–1995	Stade Lavallois	22	(2)
1995–1999	Grenoble	116	(24)
1999–2010	Istres	323	(8)
Total		510	(42)
- * Club domestic league appearances and goals

Christophe Dumolin (born January 4, 1973) is a French former professional football player. He spent eleven years at FC Istres, playing 323 league matches before retiring in 2010.
