= Bruno Savry =

French footballer (born 1974)

Personal information
- Date of birth: 11 March 1974 (age 52)
- Place of birth: Avignon, France
- Height: 1.75 m (5 ft 9 in)
- Position: Defender

Senior career*
| Years | Team | Apps | (Gls) |
| 1988–1992 | Louhans-Cuiseaux | | |
| 1992–2006 | Istres | 145 | (1) |
| 2006–2007 | Toulon | 28 | (1) |
| 2007 | Liberia Mia | 4 | (0) |
| 2007–2010 | Cassis Carnoux | 70 | (0) |
- * Club domestic league appearances and goals

Bruno Savry (born 11 March 1974) is a French former professional football defender.
