= Franck Chaussidière =

French footballer (born 1978)

Personal information
- Full name: Franck Chaussidière
- Date of birth: 1 August 1978 (age 48)
- Place of birth: Issoire, France
- Height: 1.88 m (6 ft 2 in)
- Position: Defensive midfielder

Youth career
- 1993–1998: Lens

Senior career*
Years	Team	Apps	(Gls)
1998–2001	Lens	0	(0)
1999–2000	→ Wasquehal (loan)	23	(0)
2001–2005	Istres	113	(4)
2005–2006	Laval	20	(4)
2006–2011	Clermont	151	(21)
2011–2013	Rouen	32	(1)
Total		339	(30)
- * Club domestic league appearances and goals

Franck Chaussidière (born 1 August 1978) is a retired professional footballer who played as a defensive midfielder for ES Wasquehal, FC Istres, Stade Lavallois, Clermont Foot, and FC Rouen. (Note: Franck Chaussidière – French league stats at LFP – also available in French (archived))
