= Stade Parsemain =

Football stadium in Fos-sur-Mer, France

- Interactive map of Stade Parsemain
- Location: Fos-sur-Mer, France
- Coordinates: 43°28′9.556″N 4°56′57.756″E
- Capacity: 12,500
- Surface: grass

Construction
- Opened: 2005

Tenant
- FC Istres

Stade Parsemain is a Multi-purpose stadium in Fos-sur-Mer, France. It is currently used mostly for football matches and is the home stadium of FC Istres. The stadium is able to hold 12,500 people and was built in 2005.
