= Amor Kehiha =

French-Algerian footballer (born 1977)

Personal information
- Full name: Amor Kehiha
- Date of birth: 5 September 1977 (age 49)
- Place of birth: Martigues, France
- Height: 1.80 m (5 ft 11 in)
- Position: Midfielder

Team information
- Current team: Istres

Youth career
- –1998: FC St.-Rémy

Senior career*
| Years | Team | Apps | (Gls) |
| 1998–2000 | Martigues | ? | (?) |
| 2000–2005 | Istres | 128 | (3) |
| 2005–2006 | Clermont Foot | 19 | (0) |
| 2006–2007 | Toulon | 29 | (0) |
| 2007–2008 | Cassis Carnoux | 12 | (0) |
| 2008–2012 | Istres | 78 | (2) |
| 2012–2013 | Gazélec Ajaccio | 11 | (0) |
| 2014 | US Marignane | 10 | (0) |
| 2014–2015 | FC Martigues | 21 | (0) |
| 2016– | Istres | | |
- * Club domestic league appearances and goals as of 20 July 2017 (UTC)

Amor Kehiha (born 5 September 1977) is a French-Algerian footballer who plays for Istres.

== Personal ==
His younger brother Khaled Kehiha is also a professional footballer and is currently playing for FCA Calvi as well.
