= Brahim Thiam =

Malian former professional footballer (born 1974)

Personal information
- Date of birth: 24 February 1974 (age 52)
- Place of birth: Bobigny, France
- Height: 1.85 m (6 ft 1 in)
- Positions: Defender; midfielder

Youth career
- 1991–1995: Montpellier
- 1996–1997: Saint-Denis Saint-Leu

Senior career*
Years	Team	Apps	(Gls)
1997–1998	Levante	29	(0)
1998–1999	Málaga	16	(1)
1999–2001	Red Star Saint-Ouen	16	(1)
2001–2005	Istres	105	(5)
2005–2009	Caen	63	(1)
2009–2010	Reims	20	(3)
Total		249	(11)

International career
1993	France U20		
2001–2006	Mali	17	(1)
- * Club domestic league appearances and goals

Brahim Thiam (born 24 February 1974) is a former professional footballer who played as a defender or midfielder. Born in France, he made 17 appearances for the Mali national team.

== Career ==
Thiam was born in Bobigny, France. He was said to have a good midfield partnership with Stoke City's Mamady Sidibe and Real Madrid's Mahamadou Diarra when playing internationally. He joined Stade de Reims in January 2009.

== Post-playing career ==
After retiring from playing, Thiam worked as a consultant of beIN Sports.

In September 2019 Yunis Abdelhamid's agent Alain Gauci accused Thiam of illegally acting as an agent on Abdelhamid's behalf. Thiam rejected the allegations as "false". In October 2019, the Reims prosecutor opened a "preliminary investigation".
