= Anthony Sichi =

French football manager (born 1986)

Personal information
- Date of birth: 21 January 1986 (age 40)
- Place of birth: Marignane, France
- Height: 1.78 m (5 ft 10 in)
- Position: Midfielder

Team information
- Current team: Istres (manager)

Youth career
- 1996: O Rovenain
- 2002: Martigues

Senior career*
Years	Team	Apps	(Gls)
2004–2009	Istres	72	(6)
2009–2010	Beauvais	24	(4)
2010–2011	Orléans	18	(0)
2011–2014	Strasbourg	61	(11)
2014	Cannes	10	(1)
2014–2015	FC Martigues	20	(2)
2015–2016	Béziers	8	(0)
2016	SO Romorantin	0	(0)
Total		213	(24)

Managerial career
- 2019–2023: Istres (U19)
- 2023–: Istres
- * Club domestic league appearances and goals

Anthony Sichi (born 21 June 1986) is a French professional football manager and former player who is the manager of National 2 club Istres. During his playing career, Sichi represented clubs including Istres and Strasbourg.

== Honours ==
Istres

- Championnat National: 2008–09
