= Istres FC =

French football club, based in Istres

Istres
- An editor has nominated the above file for discussion of its purpose and/or potential deletion. You are welcome to participate in the discussion and help reach a consensus.
- Full name: Istres Football Club
- Nickname: Les Aviateurs (The Aviators)
- Founded: 1920; 106 years ago
- Ground: Stade Parsemain
- Capacity: 12,500
- Chairman: Bertrand Benoît
- Manager: Anthony Sichi
- League: National 1 Group A
- 2024–25: National 2 Group A, 8th of 16
Home colours	Away colours

Istres Football Club (French pronunciation: [istʁ]; commonly referred to as simply Istres) is a French association football club based in Istres. The club was formed in 1920 and currently play their home matches at the Stade Parsemain in Istres, a commune in the Arrondissement of Istres.

== History ==
=== SS Istréenne ===
==== 1920-21 ====
FC Istres was founded in 1920 by Édouard Guizonnier as SS Istréenne. They began their history in the lower leagues, usually only facing against teams from Provence-Alpes-Côte d'Azur and Bouches-du-Rhône.

=== Istres Sports ===
In 1969, SS Istréenne was merged into the more general sports club Istres Sports, who chose to keep Istréenne's distinctive purple and black colours. In 1977 the club made young entrepreneur Michel Aviet the club's president and ex-Yugoslav goalkeeper Georges Korac the club's manager. During the Aviet-Korac years, the club advanced from France's lower amateur regional divisions all the way up to Ligue 2.

=== FC Istres Ville Nouvelle ===
==== 2003-04 season ====
They played in 2003-04 in Ligue 2 and won their first ever promotion to Ligue 1 after finishing 3rd.

=== FC Istres Ouest Provence ===
==== 2004-05 ====
FC Istres Ouest Provence logo between 2004 and 2016.

An editor has nominated the above file for discussion of its purpose and/or potential deletion. You are welcome to participate in the discussion and help reach a consensus.

In the 2004–05 season, the club reached Ligue 1 for the first time in their history but finished last and was relegated to Ligue 2.

==== 2008-09 ====
Istres returned to Ligue 2 in the 2009–10 season after winning the Championnat National 2008–09, along with AC Arles Avignon and Stade Lavallois, but on 23 June, the DNCG ruled that AC Arles-Avignon would not be allowed to play in Ligue 2 following their promotion from the Championnat National, due to irregularities in the club's financial accounts and management. On 3 July, following an appeal, the DNCG reversed its decision reinstating Arles' Ligue 2 status.

==== 2013-14 ====
After five seasons in Ligue 2, they were relegated at the end of the 2013–14 season after a 4–2 loss to Dijon FCO. They were briefly readmitted to Ligue 2 when Luzenac was denied promotion due to stadium requirements.

==== 2014-15 ====
On 11 July 2014, following the reversal of a ruling against Valenciennes, Istres' relegation was confirmed, and they returned to the Championnat National. The 2014–15 season proved to be the most catastrophic in the modern history of FC Istres Ouest Provence, marking the culmination of years of financial instability and sporting decline. Having been relegated from Ligue 2 at the end of the 2013–14 campaign, the club entered the Championnat National, France’s third tier, under immense pressure both on and off the pitch. The board faced severe financial difficulties after the withdrawal of major sponsors and a substantial reduction in municipal funding. Once considered a model of stability in the early 2000s, Istres had become emblematic of the financial fragility of smaller French professional clubs operating beyond their means.

During the summer of 2014, the club underwent significant changes. Longtime president Michel Aviet sought to balance the budget amid dwindling revenues, while head coach José Pasqualetti, who had overseen the previous relegation, departed. His replacement, Frédéric Arpinon, was tasked with rebuilding a competitive squad capable of stabilizing in the National. However, the loss of key players, including Cheick Diarra, Hicham Khaloua, and several defensive stalwarts, left the squad drastically weakened. With limited financial resources, Istres relied heavily on free agents and loan players, while several youth academy graduates were promoted prematurely to the senior team.

The club’s pre-season preparations were subdued, reflecting its precarious finances. Friendly matches against Martigues, Arles-Avignon, and Hyères were used primarily to test trialists rather than to fine-tune tactics. The mood around Stade Parsemain was one of growing anxiety, as supporters sensed the looming instability. Attendance figures, once exceeding 3,000 during Ligue 2 campaigns, fell below 800. Despite this, the squad remained optimistic at the outset of the season, hoping that experience and team cohesion could offset financial uncertainty.

The National season began poorly. Istres suffered heavy defeats in its opening matches, including a 3–0 loss to Paris FC and a 4–1 setback against US Boulogne. The team’s defensive frailty quickly became apparent, and by September, Istres had conceded the most goals in the division. Arpinon struggled to find a consistent starting eleven, frequently rotating players in search of stability. Despite occasional flashes of quality—such as a 2–1 victory over CA Bastia and a spirited draw against Red Star—the team’s inconsistency left it entrenched in the relegation zone.

As autumn progressed, the club’s financial troubles deepened. Player wages were delayed, and reports surfaced that Istres was struggling to meet DNCG (Direction Nationale du Contrôle de Gestion) compliance requirements. The DNCG had already placed the club under surveillance following the previous season’s relegation, warning of possible sanctions if deficits were not corrected. Behind the scenes, attempts to secure new investors failed, and sponsorship revenue from Ouest Provence—the intercommunal body that had long supported the club—was reduced as part of broader local government restructuring.

On the pitch, morale began to crumble. By December, Istres had gone seven matches without a win and sat in 17th place, inside the relegation zone. Arpinon was dismissed in early January 2015 and replaced by Jean-Luc Vannuchi, a former assistant familiar with the club’s infrastructure. Vannuchi attempted to re-energize the squad by promoting several youth players and adopting a more compact, counter-attacking system. Although performances improved marginally, the lack of experience and squad depth remained evident.

In February, Istres produced its best run of the season, securing consecutive victories against Avranches, Colmar, and Dunkerque, briefly lifting itself out of the relegation places. However, injuries and financial uncertainty soon halted this momentum. Several players departed before the end of the season after being released to reduce wage expenses. Training conditions deteriorated as maintenance budgets were cut, and reports in the regional press described the atmosphere as “survival mode.”

The final months of the season were dominated by off-field drama. In May 2015, the DNCG announced that Istres had failed to meet financial criteria for professional competition and was facing potential administrative relegation, regardless of sporting outcome. Despite Vannuchi’s efforts, the team finished 15th on the pitch—just outside the relegation zone—but the club’s fate was sealed in the boardroom.

On 4 June 2015, the DNCG officially confirmed Istres’ administrative relegation to the Division d’Honneur (sixth tier) due to its inability to guarantee the financial continuity of the club. The ruling was a devastating blow, effectively ending Istres’ professional era. Appeals to the FFF were unsuccessful, and in July, the decision became final. The demotion triggered a mass exodus of remaining professional staff, including players, coaches, and administrators.

The aftermath of the decision was catastrophic. The club’s professional structure was dissolved, and its limited remaining assets were transferred to the amateur association that managed the youth program. The Stade Parsemain, built in 2005 for top-flight football, suddenly stood as a relic of better days—vast, underused, and expensive to maintain. Local newspapers described Istres as “a fallen symbol of provincial football’s fragility,” while supporters’ groups held meetings to discuss forming a phoenix club if necessary.

By late summer 2015, FC Istres Ouest Provence had effectively ceased to function as a professional organization. It was allowed to register only an amateur team in the Division d’Honneur Régionale Méditerranée for the following season. The financial collapse marked the end of an era that had seen Istres rise from the CFA to Ligue 1 within a decade, only to return to the regional leagues within another.

The 2014–15 season, in hindsight, became the hinge point in the club’s modern narrative—a tragic conclusion to its professional ambitions but also the beginning of a long, slow process of rebuilding. The events of that year reshaped the identity of football in Istres, forcing it to rediscover its community roots and abandon the financial illusions that had once carried it to the top.

==== 2015-16 ====
In July 2015, the club was relegated to the seventh tier due to financial issues. Relegated from the Championnat National in 2014-15 (See above) and then administratively demoted due to unpaid debts and failure to meet DNCG financial requirements, the club had effectively lost its professional status. Its place in the national football structure was gone, and for the first time in its post-war existence, Istres was forced to compete at a purely regional level.

The summer of 2015 was consumed by the task of survival. The club’s long-serving president, Michel Aviet, whose tenure had seen both the high point of Ligue 1 football and the subsequent collapse, resigned amid public criticism of financial mismanagement. His departure left the club leaderless at a time of severe uncertainty. Into this vacuum stepped Alain Christmann, a local businessman with prior ties to the Istres youth program. Christmann’s immediate priority was administrative: ensuring the club retained its FFF license and avoided liquidation. Working with the city council and local sponsors, he negotiated short-term financial relief, secured the use of Stade Parsemain under a limited municipal agreement, and began rebuilding the organization on an amateur basis.

The restructuring was drastic. Most of the professional squad left during the summer window, seeking contracts elsewhere, while the club’s training center and academy operations were reduced to minimal levels. Wage costs were slashed, and the remaining staff—coaches, medical personnel, and administrative workers—were either volunteers or paid modest stipends. Despite the exodus, a core of loyal players, including academy graduates and regional veterans, chose to stay. Among them were midfielder Thomas Fellous, defender Kevin Munoz, and goalkeeper Anthony Boulch, who became central figures in the makeshift squad.

Pre-season preparations reflected the club’s new reality. With limited resources, training took place on local pitches around Istres, occasionally at Parsemain but often on municipal fields shared with amateur teams. The coaching staff, led by Jean-Luc Vannuchi, assembled a team from trialists, free agents, and youth products. Friendly matches were played against nearby clubs such as ES Fos, Martigues B, and AS Salon Bel-Air, primarily to assess player fitness rather than tactical systems. Attendance at these matches rarely exceeded a few dozen spectators, but the sessions rekindled a sense of local belonging that had been absent during the club’s professional years.

When the Division d’Honneur Régionale (Méditerranée) season began in September 2015, expectations were modest. Istres, once accustomed to national television coverage and professional scouting, was now facing small-town clubs in modest surroundings. The opening weeks were predictably uneven: a 1–0 defeat to US Venelles was followed by a spirited 3–2 victory over FC Rousset, demonstrating both the raw enthusiasm and defensive fragility of the new side. Vannuchi emphasized discipline and organization over flair, aware that most opponents were physically stronger and tactically seasoned in regional play.

By late autumn, Istres had settled into mid-table stability. The club’s young forwards—most notably Yannis Saïdi and Jérôme Clément—provided energy in attack, while Fellous and Munoz anchored the midfield. However, logistical and financial pressures continued to mount. The team often traveled to away fixtures in shared vehicles rather than chartered buses, and match preparations were frequently disrupted by facility shortages or administrative delays. At one point, the club nearly forfeited a match due to a missing medical certificate for one of its players. Yet, despite these challenges, Istres managed to remain competitive, earning praise within the regional press for its perseverance.

Off the pitch, Christmann and his board concentrated on financial stabilization. The club’s debts were gradually restructured, with creditors agreeing to defer payments over several years. The city of Istres provided limited municipal assistance to cover maintenance costs at Stade Parsemain, which continued to serve as the club’s official ground even if most matches drew fewer than 500 spectators. A renewed partnership was also forged with local youth academies and schools, aimed at revitalizing player development from within the community.

As the season progressed into 2016, the club’s identity became a focal point of discussion. The “Ouest Provence” component of its name, once reflective of the intercommunal structure that supported the club financially, had lost its meaning after the dissolution of the Communauté d’Agglomération Ouest Provence in early 2016. Istres, now part of the Métropole Aix-Marseille-Provence, no longer had administrative ties to the former entity. And later, this prompted Christmann and the board to propose a symbolic but significant change: a reversion to the simpler Istres Football Club, aligning the team’s name directly with the city itself, marking the beginning of the end.

The rebranding, announced in March 2016, was more than a cosmetic gesture. It signaled a philosophical shift away from dependency on external structures and toward self-sufficiency rooted in local support. In a press release, Christmann emphasized that “Istres belongs to Istres again,” declaring the club’s ambition to rise steadily through the regional ranks with homegrown players and community partnerships. Preparations for the transition included the design of a new crest and a revised kit featuring black and purple—the club’s traditional colors—replacing the outdated Ouest Provence logos.

On the field, results during the spring were encouraging. The team achieved a string of victories that lifted it into the upper half of the table, including notable wins against ES Fos and Carnoux FC. The defensive unit improved considerably, with Munoz and Boulch forming a reliable spine that reduced the team’s goals conceded ratio. While Istres was never in serious contention for promotion, its mid-table finish was celebrated as a major accomplishment given the circumstances.

The final months of the campaign brought cautious optimism. Attendance, though modest, increased slightly, and a renewed sense of pride began to permeate the club’s operations. Local press described Istres’ survival as a “renaissance in miniature,” applauding its ability to maintain existence where many similar clubs had folded. The season concluded quietly, with the team securing safety and a stable platform for future growth.

By June 2016, FC Istres Ouest Provence ceased to exist under that name, formally transitioning to Istres FC for the upcoming season. The rebranding closed a painful chapter but also marked a new beginning. The 2015–16 season, though devoid of trophies or promotion, was ultimately one of reconstruction and preservation. It ensured the club’s continuity, preserved its youth structure, and restored a measure of dignity to an institution that had narrowly escaped disappearance. In the context of Istres’ long history, it was the year that kept the flame alive.

=== Istres FC (2016-2022) ===
==== 2015-16 ====
On 12 March 2016, it was renamed Istres Football Club, effective in June, with President of the club Alain Christmann explaining, "The entity 'Ouest Provence' no longer exists, so this change is more logical. It's not a revolution, but it needed to be done."

==== 2016-17 ====
In the first season under the Istres FC name and the first since 2003-04 under the Ville d'Istres logo inside their badge, they had an eventful season.

In July 2016, Istres Football Club embarked on a new chapter following several years of financial and sporting turmoil. Previously known as FC Istres Ouest Provence, the club had been administratively relegated to the seventh tier of French football due to severe financial difficulties in 2014-15 (see above). To signify a fresh start and reconnect with the city, the club officially rebranded as Istres FC. President Alain Christmann spearheaded the reorganization, stressing the importance of stability, sustainable growth, and community engagement. The club's priority was clear: return to higher levels of French football while rebuilding its reputation and infrastructure.

During July, the club focused on pre-season preparations. Manager Jean-Luc Vannuchi, retained to guide the team through its rebuilding phase, worked with a largely local and semi-professional squad, blending youth academy graduates with experienced regional players. Pre-season friendlies were arranged against nearby clubs, including Martigues B, Salon Bel-Air, and ES Fos, allowing the coaching staff to evaluate new recruits and establish team cohesion. The sessions emphasized fitness, tactical organization, and defensive solidity, reflecting the challenges of competing with a reduced squad at the regional level. Local supporters, nostalgic for the club's more successful days, began attending training sessions and friendlies, signaling a tentative but meaningful reconnection with the fans.

August marked the beginning of Istres FC's competitive season in the Division d'Honneur Régionale Méditerranée, the seventh tier of French football. The team opened with a 3–1 victory over US Cap d'Ail, a match that showcased the attacking promise of forward Yannis Saïdi and the midfield leadership of Thomas Fellous. Subsequent matches included a goalless draw away to Aubagne B and a 2–0 home win over Carnoux FC, establishing Istres as an early contender for promotion.

Concurrently, the club began its Coupe de France campaign, advancing past US Septèmes-les-Vallons in the initial regional round with a narrow 2–1 victory, providing an early morale boost for players and fans alike. September saw Istres FC solidify its position at the top of the league. Wins against US Marseille Endoume and Stade Beaucairois, coupled with a draw against ES Fos, demonstrated growing tactical maturity and squad cohesion. In the Coupe de France, Istres overcame FC Rognac 3–0 in the second round and AS Gignac 2–1 in the third round, securing a place in the fourth round and reigniting memories of the club's previous cup exploits. The early successes fostered optimism around Stade Parsemain, with local press highlighting the club's resurgence and supporters beginning to return to the stadium in increasing numbers. October brought mixed results as the rigors of a competitive schedule tested the squad's depth. Istres continued to pursue promotion while maintaining their cup ambitions. The team recorded notable victories, including a 1–0 away win at US Marseille Endoume and a 3–0 triumph over Stade Beaucairois, though a 2–2 home draw with ES Fos exposed defensive vulnerabilities.

In the Coupe de France, Istres defeated US Carqueiranne 2–0 in the fourth round, advancing to face higher-level opposition in the fifth round. Off the field, the club invested in community engagement initiatives, hosting youth clinics and fostering local partnerships to ensure the sustainability of the club's revival. November and December focused on maintaining consistency in league play while navigating the challenges posed by cup competition. Istres continued to occupy one of the top positions in their group, relying on a disciplined defensive approach complemented by effective attacking transitions. The Coupe de France fifth round presented a more demanding challenge, and Istres were ultimately eliminated by GS Consolat after extra time, losing 1–3 in a tightly contested match. Despite the cup exit, the league campaign remained the club's primary objective, with Vannuchi urging his squad to concentrate on securing promotion. In January 2017, Istres resumed league play following a brief winter break. The squad, bolstered by several mid-season acquisitions from nearby amateur sides, displayed improved physical conditioning and tactical cohesion. The team accumulated a string of victories, including 2–0 and 3–1 wins against regional rivals, reinforcing their status as frontrunners in the Méditerranée DHR. The club also benefited from the return of injured players who had missed the first half of the season, adding depth to key positions. February and March were decisive months in Istres FC's promotion campaign. The team maintained an impressive unbeaten run at home, while achieving crucial victories in away matches that allowed them to distance themselves from their nearest competitors. Manager Vannuchi emphasized the importance of experience and composure, and players such as Saïdi, Fellous, and Bellamri became central figures, contributing key goals and leadership on the pitch. By the end of March, Istres had established a comfortable lead in the league standings, bringing the club closer to its long-sought goal of getting promoted back to Ligue 2. April and May saw Istres FC consolidate their advantage and prepare for the final stages of the season. With promotion within reach, the team approached each fixture with discipline and focus. Highlights included a series of 3–0 and 2–1 victories that confirmed the club's dominance in the division. On 16 April 2017, Istres FC secured the Division d'Honneur Régionale Méditerranée title, following a 2–0 victory over a local rival, thus achieving promotion to the Division d'Honneur for the following season. The triumph marked a significant milestone in the club's recovery, symbolizing the success of the summer's reorganization and the dedication of players, staff, and supporters. In June 2017, the season concluded with celebrations both on and off the pitch. Istres FC had not only regained a place in a higher division but had also reestablished itself as a respected presence in regional football. Preparations for the 2017–18 season began immediately, with the club aiming for a second consecutive promotion and continuing its gradual ascent through the French football pyramid. The 2016–17 season, therefore, was remembered as a period of rebirth and renewal, laying the foundations for the club's future.

==== 2017-18 ====
The 2017–18 season represented a critical phase in the gradual rebuilding of Istres Football Club, marking the second full campaign since the club’s rebirth following its financial and administrative collapse earlier in the decade. Having stabilized in the Division d’Honneur Régionale Méditerranée during the 2016–17 season, Istres approached the new campaign with renewed ambition, cautious optimism, and a growing sense of identity under the leadership of president Alain Christmann.

The summer of 2017 saw significant developments both on and off the field. For the first time since the club’s fall from the professional ranks, Istres began the season with a balanced budget and a clearly defined sporting plan. The board reinforced its commitment to local development, while the club’s youth academy—once among the most respected in southern France—was formally reintegrated into the senior structure after several years of financial dormancy. Training facilities were upgraded modestly with municipal assistance, and preseason friendlies drew the largest local crowds in years, signaling a modest but real resurgence in public enthusiasm.

Manager Jean-Luc Vannuchi, retained for a third consecutive season, built upon the foundations of the previous year. The squad remained predominantly regional, composed of young players from the Provence area alongside a few experienced semi-professionals who had returned to help guide the rebuild. Among the key figures were captain Thomas Fellous, forward Yannis Saïdi, and goalkeeper Anthony Boulch, whose leadership both on and off the field proved invaluable. Several promising academy graduates, including Julien Mendy and Kévin Azouz, were promoted to the first team, marking a return to the club’s traditional emphasis on developing homegrown talent.

In terms of competition, Istres were placed in the Ligue de la Méditerranée Regional 1 (the restructured equivalent of the former Division d’Honneur), effectively the sixth tier of French football following the FFF’s national reorganization. The club’s objectives were realistic: maintain stability, aim for a top-half finish, and strengthen infrastructure rather than chase unsustainable promotion. Nevertheless, the early months of the season demonstrated the squad’s growing maturity. Istres opened the campaign with a series of solid performances, including victories against Aubagne B, ES Fos, and US Cap d’Ail, earning plaudits for its disciplined defensive structure and efficient counter-attacking play.

By November, the team had climbed into the upper third of the table. The midfield pairing of Fellous and Mendy provided balance, while Saïdi emerged as the league’s most clinical forward, scoring decisive goals in narrow wins that reflected the club’s pragmatic style. Off the field, Istres FC launched a community outreach initiative, partnering with local schools and youth sports associations to revive football participation in the town. A new club shop opened in the center of Istres, featuring the revived black-and-purple colour scheme that had once been synonymous with its professional era.

The winter period brought a series of challenges that tested the club’s resilience. A wave of injuries to key players, combined with adverse weather and postponed fixtures, disrupted the team’s rhythm. Istres endured a six-match winless run between January and February 2018, which temporarily dropped them to mid-table. Despite these setbacks, morale within the club remained high. Vannuchi’s man-management and Christmann’s steady administrative oversight prevented panic, and by March the team had recovered its form. A run of four consecutive victories—including a 4–0 home triumph over FC Rousset—restored confidence and rekindled hopes of a top-four finish.

Meanwhile, the club’s finances showed encouraging signs of recovery. Local businesses began to reinvest, and average matchday attendance rose steadily to nearly 700—modest by national standards but a significant improvement given the club’s previous struggles. The Stade Parsemain, once a ghostly reminder of Istres’ Ligue 1 past, began to host a livelier atmosphere as supporters returned, many of them long-time fans who had stayed loyal through the club’s years in obscurity.

The closing months of the season reflected the club’s overall transformation. Istres maintained its competitive edge, finishing in the top five of Regional 1, narrowly missing out on promotion but achieving its primary goal of consolidation. The team’s attacking play improved markedly in the spring, with Saïdi finishing among the league’s top scorers, while the defensive unit led by Munoz and Boulch recorded several clean sheets.

Off the pitch, the board continued to focus on infrastructure. Plans were drafted to form a semi-professional structure for the 2018–19 season, with ambitions of returning to the Championnat National 3 within two years. The club also secured a renewed partnership with the city’s sports department, ensuring long-term access to Parsemain and its training facilities.

By June 2018, Istres FC had completed what many considered its first truly stable and sustainable campaign since the collapse of 2015. The club had reestablished its reputation in Provence as a serious, community-driven footballing institution and demonstrated that recovery was not only possible but already well underway. The season was remembered not for trophies or promotion but for restoration—of pride, structure, and purpose. The gradual climb back toward the national tiers had begun in earnest, with the 2017–18 campaign marking the turning point from survival to ambition.

=== Istres FC (2022-present) ===
==== 2023-24 ====
They achieved promotion to the Championnat National 2 in 2024.

=== Naming history ===
- SS Istréenne (1920–1969)
- Istres Sports (1969–1990)
- FC Istres Ville Nouvelle (1990–2004)
- FC Istres Ouest Provence (2004–2016)
- Istres FC (2016–present)

== Players ==
=== Current squad ===
As of 10 April 2026

None of the players have a fixed/assigned shirt number by the club.

Note: Flags indicate national team as defined under FIFA eligibility rules; some limited exceptions apply. Players may hold more than one non-FIFA nationality.

No.	Pos.	Nation	Player
1	GK	COM	Salim Ben Boina
2	DF	FRA	Ianis Polla Boyom
4	DF	FRA	Nolann Quémard
5	DF	FRA	Adam Dihad
6	MF	FRA	Adama Niakaté
7	FW	COM	Zaïd Amir
8	MF	FRA	Mahamadou Konté
9	FW	FRA	Bastian Badu
10	MF	FRA	Matéo Loubatières (on loan from Bastia)
11	FW	COM	Ibrahim Madi
14	MF	ALG	Foued Kadir

No.	Pos.	Nation	Player
17	DF	ALG	Abdelkrim Khechmar
18	MF	MAR	Amine Mokhtari
19	MF	FRA	Landry Nkulu
20	DF	FRA	Thibault Relange
21	MF	FRA	Simon Cara
22	MF	FRA	Ikrame Abdallah
23	DF	FRA	Esteban Marre
25	DF	FRA	Salomon Abergel
26	MF	FRA	Samir Yara
27	FW	FRA	Aymane Nassiri
30	GK	CGO	Will-Césaire Matimbou
33	FW	FRA	Yanis Boukeroucha

=== Notable former players ===
For a list of former Istres players, see below

== Rivalries ==
The club has two major rivalries. First is with neighbours FC Martigues, with many encounters over the years. The second is the Provence derby against AC Arles-Avignon.

== Honours ==
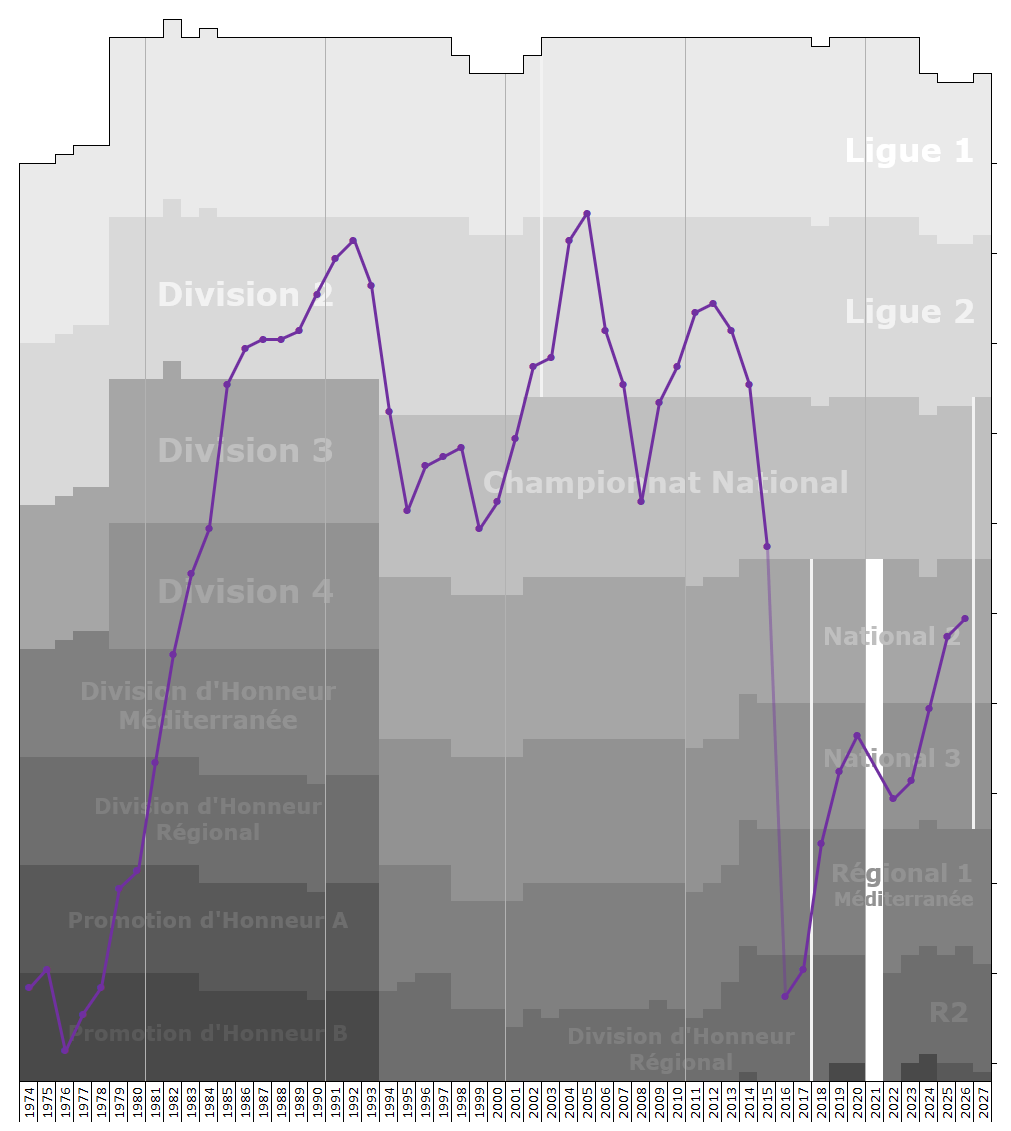
Historical league performance chart of Istres FC

- National
  - Champions (1): 2008–09
- Méditerranée Division d'Honneur
  - Champions (2): 1982, 1990
  - Runner-ups (1): 2018
- Méditerranée Division Honneur Regionale
  - Champions (1): 2017
- Coupe de Provence
  - Champions (4): 1933, 1982, 1987, 1989

== See also ==
- 2004–05 FC Istres season
