= 2015–16 AS Monaco FC season =

Monaco
2015–16 season
- President: Dmitry Rybolovlev
- Head coach: Leonardo Jardim
- Stadium: Stade Louis II
- Ligue 1: 3rd
- Coupe de France: Round of 16
- Coupe de la Ligue: Round of 16
- UEFA Champions League: Play-off round
- UEFA Europa League: Group stage
- Top goalscorer: League: Bernardo Silva (7); All: Lacina Traoré (10)
- Highest home attendance: 16,224 vs Paris Saint-Germain (30 August 2015)
- Lowest home attendance: 5,388 vs Caen (2 December 2015)
- Average home league attendance: 7,846
Home colours	Away colours	Third colours

The 2015–16 AS Monaco FC season was the club's third season back in Ligue 1 since its promotion from Ligue 2 in 2013. Monaco participated in Ligue 1, the UEFA Champions League, the Coupe de France and the Coupe de la Ligue.

== Players ==
=== Current squad ===
As of 1 February 2016.

Note: Flags indicate national team as defined under FIFA eligibility rules; some limited exceptions apply. Players may hold more than one non-FIFA nationality.

No.	Pos.	Nation	Player
1	GK	CRO	Danijel Subašić
2	DF	BRA	Fabinho
4	DF	POR	Fábio Coentrão (on loan from Real Madrid)
5	DF	BRA	Jemerson
6	DF	POR	Ricardo Carvalho
7	MF	MAR	Nabil Dirar
8	MF	POR	João Moutinho (vice-captain)
9	FW	BRA	Vágner Love
10	MF	POR	Bernardo Silva
11	FW	ARG	Guido Carrillo
12	MF	FRA	Farès Bahlouli
13	DF	BRA	Wallace (on loan from Braga)
14	MF	FRA	Tiémoué Bakayoko
16	GK	FRA	Paul Nardi
17	FW	POR	Ivan Cavaleiro
18	FW	POR	Hélder Costa (on loan from Benfica)

No.	Pos.	Nation	Player
19	FW	CIV	Lacina Traoré
20	MF	CRO	Mario Pašalić (on loan from Chelsea)
21	DF	NGR	Elderson Echiéjilé
23	MF	MLI	Adama Traoré
24	DF	ITA	Andrea Raggi
27	MF	FRA	Thomas Lemar
28	MF	FRA	Jérémy Toulalan (captain)
29	FW	FRA	Kylian Mbappé
30	GK	SEN	Seydou Sy
34	DF	FRA	Raphaël Diarra
35	MF	FRA	Jonathan Mexique
36	DF	FRA	Mehdi Beneddine
38	DF	MLI	Almamy Touré
41	MF	FRA	Yhoan Andzouana
47	DF	FRA	Kévin N'Doram

=== Reserve squad ===
Note: Flags indicate national team as defined under FIFA eligibility rules; some limited exceptions apply. Players may hold more than one non-FIFA nationality.

No.	Pos.	Nation	Player
—	DF	CHA	Kévin N'Doram
—	DF	FRA	Yarouba Cissako
—	MF	MAR	Fawzi Ouaamar

No.	Pos.	Nation	Player
—	MF	GHA	David Mills
—	FW	FRA	Corentin Tirard

=== Out on loan ===
Note: Flags indicate national team as defined under FIFA eligibility rules; some limited exceptions apply. Players may hold more than one non-FIFA nationality.

No.	Pos.	Nation	Player
25	MF	POR	Rony Lopes (at Lille)
29	MF	BRA	Gabriel Boschilia (at Standard Liège)
31	MF	POR	Gil Dias (at Varzim)
—	DF	FRA	Abdou Diallo (at Zulte Waregem)
—	DF	COD	Marcel Tisserand (at Toulouse)
—	MF	FRA	Dylan Bahamboula (at Paris FC)
—	MF	CGO	Delvin N'Dinga (at Lokomotiv Moscow)
—	MF	FRA	Jessy Pi (at Troyes)

No.	Pos.	Nation	Player
—	MF	CMR	Edgar Salli (at St. Gallen)
—	FW	COL	Radamel Falcao (at Chelsea)
—	FW	FRA	Valère Germain (at Nice)
—	FW	FRA	Corentin Jean (at Troyes)
—	FW	CAF	Quentin Ngakoutou (at Evian)
—	FW	FRA	Allan Saint-Maximin (at Hannover 96)
—	FW	FRA	Christopher Lina (at Bastia)
—	FW	GUI	Tafsir Chérif (at Varzim)

== Transfers ==
=== Summer ===
In: Note: Flags indicate national team as defined under FIFA eligibility rules; some limited exceptions apply. Players may hold more than one non-FIFA nationality.

No.	Pos.	Nation	Player
2	DF	BRA	Fabinho (from (Portugal) Rio Ave, previously on loan)
4	DF	POR	Fábio Coentrão (loan from (Spain) Real Madrid)
12	MF	FRA	Farès Bahlouli (from (France) Lyon)
13	DF	BRA	Wallace (loan extended from (Portugal) Braga)
16	GK	FRA	Paul Nardi (loan return from (France) Nancy)
17	FW	POR	Ivan Cavaleiro (from (Portugal) Benfica)
18	FW	POR	Hélder Costa (loan from (Portugal) Benfica)
20	MF	CRO	Mario Pašalić (loan from (England) Chelsea)
22	FW	ITA	Stephan El Shaarawy (loan from (Italy) Milan)
25	MF	POR	Rony Lopes (from (England) Manchester City)
27	MF	FRA	Thomas Lemar (from (France) Caen)
29	MF	BRA	Gabriel Boschilia (from (Brazil) São Paulo)
—	MF	MAR	Fawzi Ouaamar (loan return from (France) Arles-Avignon)
—	FW	GUI	Tafsir Chérif (loan return from (France) Orléans)
—	DF	FRA	Yarouba Cissako (loan return from (Belgium) Zulte Waregem)

Out: Note: Flags indicate national team as defined under FIFA eligibility rules; some limited exceptions apply. Players may hold more than one non-FIFA nationality.

No.	Pos.	Nation	Player
3	DF	FRA	Layvin Kurzawa (to (France) Paris Saint-Germain €23 million)
5	DF	TUN	Aymen Abdennour (to (Spain) Valencia)
9	FW	FRA	Anthony Martial (to (England) Manchester United)
9	FW	BUL	Dimitar Berbatov (to (Greece) PAOK)
12	FW	BRA	Matheus Carvalho (loan return to (Brazil) Fluminense)
16	GK	NED	Maarten Stekelenburg (loan return to (England) Fulham)
17	MF	BEL	Yannick Carrasco (to (Spain) Atlético Madrid)
18	FW	FRA	Valère Germain (loan to (France) Nice)
22	MF	FRA	Geoffrey Kondogbia (to (Italy) Inter Milan)
25	MF	BFA	Alain Traoré (loan return to (France) Lorient)
25	MF	FRA	Jessy Pi (loan extended to (France) Troyes)
26	MF	CMR	Edgar Salli (loan to (Switzerland) St. Gallen)
29	MF	FRA	Dylan Bahamboula (loan to (France) Paris FC)
32	DF	COD	Marcel Tisserand (loan extended to (France) Toulouse)
33	FW	FRA	Aboubakar Kamara (to (Belgium) Kortrijk)
40	GK	FRA	Marc-Aurèle Caillard (to (France) Clermont)
—	DF	FRA	Nicolas Isimat-Mirin (to (Netherlands) PSV, previously on loan)
—	MF	ARG	Lucas Ocampos (to (France) Marseille, previously on loan)
—	MF	MAR	Mounir Obbadi (to (France) Lille, previously on loan to (Italy) Hellas Verona)
—	FW	ITA	Gaetano Monachello (to (Italy) Atalanta, previously on loan to (Italy) Virtus Lanciano)
—	DF	ESP	Borja López (loan to (Portugal) Arouca, previously on loan to (Spain) Deportivo La Coruña)
—	MF	GHA	David Mills (loan to (France) Paris FC)
—	MF	CGO	Delvin N'Dinga (loan to (Russia) Lokomotiv Moscow, previously on loan to (Greece) Olympiacos)
—	FW	CAF	Quentin Ngakoutou (loan to (France) Evian, previously on loan to (Switzerland) Lausanne-Sport)
—	FW	COL	Radamel Falcao (loan to (England) Chelsea, previously on loan to (England) Manchester United)

=== Winter ===
In: Note: Flags indicate national team as defined under FIFA eligibility rules; some limited exceptions apply. Players may hold more than one non-FIFA nationality.

No.	Pos.	Nation	Player
5	DF	BRA	Jemerson (from (Brazil) Atlético Mineiro)
9	FW	BRA	Vágner Love (from (Brazil) Corinthians)
—	MF	GHA	David Mills (loan return from (France) Paris FC)

Out: Note: Flags indicate national team as defined under FIFA eligibility rules; some limited exceptions apply. Players may hold more than one non-FIFA nationality.

No.	Pos.	Nation	Player
22	FW	ITA	Stephan El Shaarawy (loan return to (Italy) Milan)
25	MF	POR	Rony Lopes (loan to (France) Lille)
29	MF	BRA	Gabriel Boschilia (loan to (Belgium) Standard Liège)
31	MF	POR	Gil Dias (loan to (Portugal) Varzim)
—	DF	ESP	Borja López (to (Spain) Barcelona B, previously on loan to (Portugal) Arouca)
—	FW	GUI	Tafsir Chérif (loan to (Portugal) Varzim)
—	FW	FRA	Christopher Lina (loan to (France) Bastia)

== Friendlies ==
4 July 2015 Lotto Lubelskie Cup	Monaco	0–1	Hannover 96	Lublin, Poland
CEST (UTC+2)		Report	Benschop 81'	Stadium: Arena Lublin

5 July 2015 Lotto Lubelskie Cup	Monaco	0–3	Shakhtar Donetsk	Lublin, Poland
13:30 CEST (UTC+2)		Report	Marlos 4', 14'; Taison 51'	Stadium: Arena Lublin

10 July 2015	Monaco	0–1	Dynamo Moscow	Fontvieille
19:45 CEST (UTC+2)		Report	Valbuena 7'	Stadium: Stade Louis II

14 July 2015	Monaco	1–0	Queens Park Rangers	Saint-Vincent, Italy
17:00 CEST (UTC+2)	Cavaleiro 15'	Report

17 July 2015	Monaco	3–1	PSV	Saint-Vincent, Italy
CEST (UTC+2)		[ Report]

18 July 2015	Monaco	0–0	Paris FC	Saint-Vincent, Italy
18:00 CEST (UTC+2)		Summary; Report		Attendance: 6,280

22 July 2015	Monaco	5–1	Mainz 05	Saint-Vincent, Italy
19:00 CEST (UTC+2)	Martial 18', 19'; Cavaleiro 30'; Kurzawa 62'; Carrillo 79'	Report	Jairo 12'

== Competitions ==
=== Ligue 1 ===
==== League table ====
Pos	Team	Pld	W	D	L	GF	GA	GD	Pts	Qualification or relegation
1	Paris Saint-Germain (C)	38	30	6	2	102	19	+83	96	Qualification for the Champions League group stage
2	Lyon	38	19	8	11	67	43	+24	65	Qualification for the Champions League group stage
3	Monaco	38	17	14	7	57	50	+7	65	Qualification for the Champions League third qualifying round
4	Nice	38	18	9	11	58	41	+17	63	Qualification for the Europa League group stage (Note: Since the winners of the 2015–16 Coupe de France and the 2015–16 Coupe de la Ligue, Paris Saint-Germain, qualified for European competition based on their league position, the spot awarded to the Coupe de France winners (Europa League group stage) was passed to the fourth-placed team and the spot awarded to the Coupe de la Ligue winners (Europa League third qualifying round) was passed to the sixth-placed team. The fifth-placed team received the spot in Europa League third qualifying round originally designated to the fourth-placed team.)
5	Lille	38	15	15	8	39	27	+12	60	Qualification for the Europa League third qualifying round

Source: Ligue 1, Soccerway
Rules for classification: 1) Points; 2) Goal difference; 3) Goals scored; 4) Head-to-head points; 5) Head-to-head goal difference; 6) Fairplay ranking.
(C) Champions

==== Results summary ====
Overall								Home						Away					
Pld	W	D	L	GF	GA	GD	Pts	W	D	L	GF	GA	GD	W	D	L	GF	GA	GD
38	17	14	7	57	50	+7	65	10	6	3	30	19	+11	7	8	4	27	31	−4

Last updated: 14 May 2016.
Source: Competitive matches

==== Results by round ====
Round	1	2	3	4	5	6	7	8	9	10	11	12	13	14	15	16	17	18	19	20	21	22	23	24	25	26	27	28	29	30	31	32	33	34	35	36	37	38
Ground	A	H	A	H	A	H	A	A	H	H	A	H	A	H	H	A	A	H	A	H	A	H	A	H	H	A	H	A	A	H	A	H	A	H	A	H	A	H
Result	W	D	D	L	W	L	W	D	D	D	W	W	L	W	D	D	W	W	D	D	W	W	L	W	W	D	W	D	D	D	W	L	L	W	D	W	L	W
Position	2	6	8	13	8	11	10	9	10	11	9	6	9	6	7	6	4	3	2	3	2	2	2	2	2	2	2	2	2	2	2	2	3	2	3	3	3	3

Source: Ligue1
A = Away; H = Home; W = Win; D = Draw; L = Loss

==== Matches ====
Win Draw Loss

8 August 2015 1	Nice	1–2	Monaco	Nice
21:00 CEST (UTC+2)	Germain 7'; Boscagli (yellow card) 14' (yellow-red card) 44'; Pléa (yellow card) 39'; Baysse (yellow card) 84'	Report	Kurzawa (yellow card) 41', (goal) 62'; Carvalho (yellow card) 45+3'; Silva 51'	Stadium: Allianz Riviera; Attendance: 25,173; Referee: Lionel Jaffredo

14 August 2015 2	Monaco	0–0	Lille	Fontvieille
20:30 CEST (UTC+2)	Silva (yellow card) 42'	Report	Corchia (yellow card) 24'; Civelli (yellow card) 44'; Obbadi (yellow card) 60'; Boufal (yellow card) 75'; Tallo (yellow card) 79'	Stadium: Stade Louis II; Attendance: 13,331; Referee: Benoît Millot

22 August 2015 3	Toulouse	1–1	Monaco	Toulouse
20:00 CEST (UTC+2)	Doumbia 22'	Report	Wallace (yellow card) 50'; Touré (yellow card) 57'; Lemar 65'; A. Traoré (yellow card) 80'; Silva (yellow card) 87'	Stadium: Stadium Municipal; Attendance: 12,748; Referee: Stéphane Lannoy

30 August 2015 4	Monaco	0–3	Paris Saint-Germain	Fontvieille
21:00 CEST (UTC+2)		Report	Cavani 57', 73'; David Luiz (yellow card) 70'; Lavezzi 83'	Stadium: Stade Louis II; Attendance: 16,224; Referee: Benoît Bastien

13 September 2015 5	Gazélec Ajaccio	0–1	Monaco	Ajaccio
14:00 CEST (UTC+2)	Martinez (yellow card) 20'; Ducourtioux (yellow card) 30'; Youga (yellow card) 90+1'	Report	Fabinho (yellow card) 11', (goal) 17' (pen.); Echiéjilé (yellow card) 76'; Bahlouli (yellow card) 90+4'	Stadium: Stade Ange Casanova; Attendance: 3,880; Referee: Sébastien Moreira

20 September 2015 6	Monaco	2–3	Lorient	Fontvieille
17:00 CEST (UTC+2)	Touré 21'; Lemar 47'; Raggi (yellow card) 75'; Coentrão (yellow card) 87'; Carrillo (yellow card) 87'; Carvalho (yellow card) 90+2'	Report	Ndong 12'; Jeannot 18'; Koné (yellow card) 23'; Guerreiro (yellow card) 43'; Philippoteaux (yellow card) 50'; Moukandjo 59'; Abdullah (yellow card) 61'	Stadium: Stade Louis II; Attendance: 6,140; Referee: Amaury Delerue

24 September 2015 7	Montpellier	2–3	Monaco	Montpellier
19:55 CEST (UTC+2)	Congré 26'; Carrillo 45' (o.g.); Ligali (yellow card) 90+4'; Bensebaini (yellow card) 90+6'	Report	Coentrão 56'; Lemar 65'; Touré (yellow card) 72'; Fabinho 90+5' (pen.)	Stadium: Stade de la Mosson; Attendance: 10,032; Referee: Clément Turpin

27 September 2015 8	Guingamp	3–3	Monaco	Guingamp
17:00 CEST (UTC+2)	Jacobsen (yellow card) 24'; Privat 30'; Benezet 65', 89'; Mathis (yellow card) 70'; Sankharé (yellow card) 84'; Bègue (yellow card) 86'; Salibur (yellow card) 90+3'	Report	Silva 14'; Carvalho (yellow card) 32'; Raggi 45', (yellow card) 90+3'; Bakayoko (yellow card) 60'; Dirar 71'	Stadium: Stade du Roudourou; Attendance: 13,987; Referee: Wilfried Bien

4 October 2015 9	Monaco	1–1	Rennes	Fontvieille
14:00 CEST (UTC+2)	Raggi (yellow card) 43'; Wallace 51', (yellow card) 90'; Fabinho (yellow card) 64'	Report	Pedro Henrique (yellow card) 8'; Doucouré 41'; Grosicki (yellow card) 77'	Stadium: Stade Louis II; Attendance: 5,552; Referee: Tony Chapron

16 October 2015 10	Monaco	1–1	Lyon	Fontvieille
20:30 CEST (UTC+2)	L. Traoré (yellow card) 2'; Pašalić 39'; Wallace (red card) 65'; Silva (yellow card) 87'	Report	Yanga-Mbiwa (yellow card) 9'; Rafael 84'; Umtiti (yellow card) 87'	Stadium: Stade Louis II; Attendance: 9,513; Referee: Fredy Fautrel

25 October 2015 11	Reims	0–1	Monaco	Reims
14:00 CET (UTC+1)	Devaux (yellow card) 62' (yellow-red card) 69'; Charbonnier (yellow card) 67'	Report	Silva 11'; Subašić (yellow card) 90'; Cavaleiro (yellow card) 90+1'	Stadium: Stade Auguste Delaune; Attendance: 14,238; Referee: Frank Schneider

1 November 2015 12	Monaco	1–0	Angers	Fontvieille
17:00 CET (UTC+1)	L. Traoré (yellow card) 26'; Pašalić 35'; Echiéjilé (yellow card) 40'	Report	Camara (yellow card) 45+1'; N'Doye (yellow card) 59'; Andreu (yellow card) 63'; Thomas (yellow card) 75'	Stadium: Stade Louis II; Attendance: 6,075; Referee: Bartolomeu Varela

8 November 2015 13	Bordeaux	3–1	Monaco	Bordeaux
21:00 CET (UTC+1)	Poko (yellow card) 30'; Maurice-Belay 36'; Yambéré 40'; Plašil 48'; Khazri (yellow card) 65'	Report	Costa 23'; El Shaarawy (yellow card) 66'; Fabinho (yellow card) 72'	Stadium: Matmut Atlantique; Attendance: 21,090; Referee: Benoît Millot

21 November 2015 14	Monaco	1–0	Nantes	Fontvieille
20:00 CET (UTC+1)	Pašalić 43'; Carvalho (yellow card) 70'; L. Traoré (yellow card) 72'	Report	Sabaly (yellow card) 42'	Stadium: Stade Louis II; Attendance: 5,733; Referee: Antony Gautier

29 November 2015 15	Marseille	3–3	Monaco	Marseille
21:00 CET (UTC+1)	Alessandrini 12'; Batshuayi 51'; Mendy (yellow card) 74'; Nkoudou 82'	Report	Touré 18', 39', (yellow card) 70'; Costa (yellow card) 33'; Coentrão 72'; Echiéjilé (yellow card) 90+4'	Stadium: Stade Vélodrome; Attendance: 42,882; Referee: Clément Turpin

2 December 2015 16	Monaco	1–1	Caen	Fontvieille
19:00 CET (UTC+1)	Carrillo 56'	Report	Bessat (yellow card) 30'; Leborgne (yellow card) 77'; Rodelin 86'	Stadium: Stade Louis II; Attendance: 5,388; Referee: Stéphane Lannoy

5 December 2015 17	Bastia	1–2	Monaco	Furiani
20:00 CET (UTC+1)	Danic (yellow card) 33'; Mostefa (yellow card) 42'; Raspentino (yellow card) 42'; Romain 90'	Report	Dirar (yellow card) 42'; L. Traoré 72', 84'	Stadium: Stade Armand Cesari; Attendance: 10,596; Referee: Ruddy Buquet

13 December 2015 18	Monaco	1–0	Saint-Étienne	Fontvieille
14:00 CET (UTC+1)	Carvalho (yellow card) 21'; Fabinho (yellow card) 78', (goal) 82'; Toulalan (yellow card) 90'	Report	Malcuit (yellow card) 25' (yellow-red card) 64'; Pajot (yellow card) 29'; Bayal Sall (yellow card) 50'	Stadium: Stade Louis II; Attendance: 7,213; Referee: Mikael Lesage

19 December 2015 19	Troyes	0–0	Monaco	Troyes
20:00 CET (UTC+1)	Dabo (red card) 3'; Azamoum (yellow card) 42'; Karaboué (yellow card) 82'	Report	Costa (yellow card) 43'; Wallace (yellow card) 56'; Lemar (yellow card) 81'	Stadium: Stade de l'Aube; Attendance: 16,266; Referee: Wilfried Bien

9 January 2016 20	Monaco	2–2	Gazélec Ajaccio	Fontvieille
20:00 CET (UTC+1)	Moutinho (yellow card) 26'; Fabinho 51' (pen.); Coentrão (yellow card) 53'; Carvalho 73'	Report	Boutaïb 9'; Tshibumbu 31'; Ducourtioux (yellow card) 36'; Lemoigne (yellow card) 72'; Sylla (yellow card) 76'	Stadium: Stade Louis II; Attendance: 5,542; Referee: Stéphane Jochem

17 January 2016 21	Lorient	0–2	Monaco	Lorient
14:00 CET (UTC+1)	Ndong (yellow card) 29'; Jouffre (yellow card) 40'	Report	Lemar 53'; Moutinho 57'; Coentrão (yellow card) 65'	Stadium: Stade du Moustoir; Attendance: 10,742; Referee: Benoît Bastien

24 January 2016 22	Monaco	4–0	Toulouse	Fontvieille
14:00 CET (UTC+1)	Bakayoko (yellow card) 24'; Silva 28', (yellow card) 40'; Coentrão 36'; Carvalho (yellow card) 39'; Moutinho (yellow card) 52'; Carrillo 70'; Costa 90+2'	Report	Somália (yellow card) 35'	Stadium: Stade Louis II; Attendance: 5,628; Referee: Hakim Ben El Hadj

30 January 2016 23	Angers	3–0	Monaco	Angers
17:00 CET (UTC+1)	N'Doye 19', 43'; Capelle (yellow card) 39'; Yattara 55'; Sunu (yellow card) 79'	Report	Costa (yellow card) 26'; Coentrão (yellow card) 29'; Carrillo (yellow card) 70'	Stadium: Stade Jean-Bouin; Attendance: 13,598; Referee: Ruddy Buquet

2 February 2016 24	Monaco	2–0	Bastia	Fontvieille
19:00 CET (UTC+1)	Fabinho (yellow card) 30'; Modesto 35' (o.g.); Pašalić (yellow card) 61'; Silva 75'	Report	Diallo (yellow card) 66'	Stadium: Stade Louis II; Attendance: 5,607; Referee: Nicolas Rainville

6 February 2016 25	Monaco	1–0	Nice	Fontvieille
14:00 CET (UTC+1)	Dirar (yellow card) 48' (yellow-red card) 48'; Bakayoko 81'; Subašić (yellow card) 90+1'; Silva (yellow card) 90+2'; Moutinho (yellow card) 90+4'	Report	Germain (yellow card) 8'; Cardinale (yellow card) 25'; Koziello (yellow card) 44'; Le Marchand (yellow card) 45+1'; Pied (yellow card) 80'; Pereira (yellow card) 90+3'	Stadium: Stade Louis II; Attendance: 12,842; Referee: Tony Chapron

14 February 2016 26	Saint-Étienne	1–1	Monaco	Saint-Étienne
17:00 CET (UTC+1)	Bayal Sall 57'	Report	Wallace (yellow card) 56'; Vágner Love 84'	Stadium: Stade Geoffroy-Guichard; Attendance: 31,868; Referee: Fredy Fautrel

20 February 2016 27	Monaco	3–1	Troyes	Fontvieille
20:00 CET (UTC+1)	Carrillo 25', 37'; Toulalan (yellow card) 43'; Bakayoko (yellow card) 83'; Mbappé 90+3'	Report	Guèye 80'	Stadium: Stade Louis II; Attendance: 5,650; Referee: Johan Hamel

28 February 2016 28	Nantes	0–0	Monaco	Nantes
14:00 CET (UTC+1)	Gillet (yellow card) 74'	Report	Mbappé (yellow card) 53'	Stadium: Stade de la Beaujoire; Attendance: Mikael Lesage; Referee: 26,866

4 March 2016 29	Caen	2–2	Monaco	Caen
20:30 CET (UTC+01:00)	Yahia (yellow card) 63'; Féret 64' (pen.); Kouakou 89'	Report	Lemar 56'; Fabinho (yellow card) 63'; Yahia 69' (o.g.); Silva (yellow card) 74'; Toulalan (yellow card) 85'; Costa (yellow card) 90+1'	Stadium: Stade Michel d'Ornano; Attendance: 17,926; Referee: Clément Turpin

11 March 2016 30	Monaco	2–2	Reims	Fontvieille
20:30 CET (UTC+1)	Vágner Love 5', 38'; Echiéjilé (yellow card) 36'; Silva (yellow card) 73'	Report	Carrasso (yellow card) 5'; Charbonnier 11'; Conte (yellow card) 70'; Diego 79'	Stadium: Stade Louis II; Attendance: 5,738; Referee: Benoît Millot

20 March 2016 31	Paris Saint-Germain	0–2	Monaco	Paris
21:00 CET (UTC+01:00)	David Luiz (yellow card) 67'	Report	Jemerson (yellow card) 32'; Vágner Love 65'; Fabinho 68' (pen.)	Stadium: Parc des Princes; Attendance: 46,569; Referee: Antony Gautier

1 April 2016 32	Monaco	1–2	Bordeaux	Fontvieille
20:30 CEST (UTC+02:00)	Vágner Love (yellow card) 90+2'; Guilbert 90+3' (o.g.)	Report	Touré 45+2'; Ounas 56'; Yambéré (yellow card) 90'	Stadium: Stade Louis II; Attendance: 6,852; Referee: Benoît Bastien

10 April 2016 33	Lille	4–1	Monaco	Lille
14:00 CEST (UTC+02:00)	Obbadi (yellow card) 32', (goal) 77'; Amalfitano 37'; Civelli (red card) 55'; Eder 67'; Sidibé 88'	Report	Raggi (yellow card) 43'; Fabinho (yellow card) 44'; Echiéjilé (red card) 64'; Bahlouli 90'	Stadium: Stade Pierre-Mauroy; Attendance: 32,125; Referee: Sébastien Moreira

16 April 2016 34	Monaco	2–1	Marseille	Monaco
21:00 CET (UTC+01:00)	Silva 47'; Raggi 75', (yellow card) 76'	Report	Batshuayi 90+3'	Stadium: Stade Louis II; Attendance: 10,056; Referee: Antony Gautier

24 April 2016 35	Rennes	1–1	Monaco	Rennes
21:00 CEST (UTC+02:00)	Sio 80'; Danzé (yellow card) 86'	Report	Costa 14'; Fabinho (yellow card) 79'; Carrillo (yellow card) 90+1'; Wallace (yellow card) 90+3'	Stadium: Roazhon Park; Attendance: 23,251; Referee: Fredy Fautrel

30 April 2016 36	Monaco	3–2	Guingamp	Monaco
19:00 CEST (UTC+02:00)	A. Traoré 17'; Dirar 40'; Silva 76'; Carvalho (yellow card) 89'; Subašić (yellow card) 90+2'	Report	Erdinç 75'; Angoua 81', (yellow card) 84'	Stadium: Stade Louis II; Attendance: 6,669; Referee: Clément Turpin

7 May 2016 37	Lyon	6–1	Monaco	Lyon
21:00 CET (UTC+1)	Ghezzal 3'; Lacazette 8', 35', 80'; Yanga-Mbiwa 34', 59'; Gonalons (yellow card) 63'	Report	L. Traoré (yellow card) 21' (yellow-red card) 23'; Carvalho 41', (yellow card) 75'; Toulalan (yellow card) 65'; Jemerson (yellow card) 70'	Stadium: Parc Olympique Lyonnais; Attendance: 56,696; Referee: Ruddy Buquet

14 May 2016 38	Monaco	2–0	Montpellier	Monaco
21:00 CEST (UTC+02:00)	Cavaleiro 3'; Fabinho 32' (pen.), (yellow card) 89'; Wallace (yellow card) 72'; Toulalan (yellow card) 89'	Report	Dabo (yellow card) 23'	Stadium: Stade Louis II; Attendance: 9,318; Referee: Benoît Bastien

=== Coupe de la Ligue ===
16 December 2015 Round of 16	Bordeaux	3–0	Monaco	Bordeaux
17:00 CET (UTC+1)	Ounas 16'; Rolán 57'; Saivet 89'	Report	Boschilia (yellow card) 71'; Raggi (yellow card) 78'	Stadium: Matmut Atlantique; Attendance: 15,163; Referee: Frank Schneider

=== Coupe de France ===
3 January 2016 Round of 64	Monaco	10–2	Saint-Jean Beaulieu	Fontvieille
18:00 CET (UTC+1)	L. Traoré 21', 31', 34', 45', (red card) 45'; Raggi 29'; Bahlouli 48'; Fabinho 52' (pen.), 86' (pen.); Costa 54'; Pašalić 80'	Report	Meddour (yellow card) 24'; Mariotti (red card) 45'; Tahtouh (yellow card) 52'; Leblanc 78'; Sahour 82' (pen.)	Stadium: Stade Louis II; Attendance: 9,000; Referee: Nicolas Rainville

20 January 2016 Round of 32	Evian	1–3 (a.e.t.)	Monaco	Annecy
18:30 CET (UTC+1)	Soares (yellow card) 55'; Kamin 63'	Report	Wallace (yellow card) 10'; L. Traoré 45+2'; Fabinho (yellow card) 98'; Pašalić 103'; Costa 119'	Stadium: Parc des Sports; Attendance: 3,869; Referee: Johann Hamel

9 February 2016 Round of 16	Sochaux	2–1	Monaco	Montbéliard
21:00 CET (UTC+1)	Teikeu (yellow card) 11'; Martin 19'; Fuchs (yellow card) 44'; Sacko 54', (yellow card) 55'	Report	Bakayoko 38'; Jemerson (yellow card) 57'; Carrillo (yellow card) 65'	Stadium: Stade Auguste Bonal; Attendance: 9,430; Referee: Bartolomeu Varela

=== UEFA Champions League ===
==== Qualifying rounds ====
===== Third qualifying round =====
28 July 2015 First leg	Young Boys (Switzerland)	1–3	(France) Monaco	Bern, Switzerland
20:15 CEST (UTC+2)	Nuzzolo 74'	Report	Kurzawa 64'; Carrillo 72'; Pašalić 75', (yellow card) 90+1'	Stadium: Stade de Suisse; Attendance: 16,079; Referee: Matej Jug (Slovenia)

4 August 2015 Second leg	Monaco (France)	4–0 (7–1 agg.)	(Switzerland) Young Boys	Fontvieille, Monaco
20:45 CEST (UTC+2)	Fabinho (yellow card) 48'; Cavaleiro 54'; Kurzawa 64'; Martial 70'; El Shaarawy 77'	Report	Vilotić (yellow card) 25'; Bertone (yellow card) 39'	Stadium: Stade Louis II; Attendance: 10,457; Referee: Danny Makkelie (Netherlands)

===== Play-off round =====
19 August 2015 First leg	Valencia (Spain)	3–1	(France) Monaco	Valencia, Spain
20:45 CEST (UTC+2)	Rodrigo 4'; Parejo 59', (yellow card) 88'; Mustafi (yellow card) 78'; Feghouli 86', (yellow card) 90+4'	Report	Silva (yellow card) 2'; Pašalić 49', (yellow card) 58'; Dirar (yellow card) 66'; Raggi (yellow card) 90+3'	Stadium: Mestalla Stadium; Attendance: 45,633; Referee: Mark Clattenburg (England)

25 August 2015 Second leg	Monaco (France)	2–1 (3–4 agg.)	(Spain) Valencia	Monaco
20:45 CEST (UTC+2)	Raggi 17'; Pašalić (yellow card) 38'; Toulalan (yellow card) 56'; Echiéjilé (yellow card) 72', (goal) 75'	Report	Negredo 4'; Vezo (yellow card) 52'; Pérez (yellow card) 73'; Piatti (yellow card) 90+2'	Stadium: Stade Louis II; Attendance: 13,165; Referee: Nicola Rizzoli (Italy)

=== UEFA Europa League ===
==== Group stage ====
Pos	Team	Pld	W	D	L	GF	GA	GD	Pts	Qualification
1	(England) Tottenham Hotspur	6	4	1	1	12	6	+6	13	Advance to knockout phase
2	(Belgium) Anderlecht	6	3	1	2	8	6	+2	10	Advance to knockout phase
3	(France) Monaco	6	1	3	2	5	9	−4	6	
4	(Azerbaijan) Qarabağ	6	1	1	4	4	8	−4	4	

Source: Soccerway
Rules for classification: Group stage tiebreakers

17 September 2015 1	Anderlecht (Belgium)	1–1	(France) Monaco	Anderlecht, Belgium
21:05 CEST (UTC+2)	Gillet 11'; Suárez (yellow card) 42'; Obradović (yellow card) 69'; Defour (yellow card) 79'	Report	Echiéjilé (yellow card) 45'; Fabinho (yellow card) 66'; Wallace (yellow card) 81'; L. Traoré 85'	Stadium: Constant Vanden Stock Stadium; Attendance: 15,576; Referee: Miroslav Zelinka (Czech Republic)

1 October 2015 2	Monaco (France)	1–1	(England) Tottenham Hotspur	Fontvieille, Monaco
19:00 CEST (UTC+2)	Toulalan (yellow card) 59'; El Shaarawy 81'	Report	Lamela 35'	Stadium: Stade Louis II; Attendance: 7,216; Referee: Artur Soares Dias (Portugal)

22 October 2015 3	Monaco (France)	1–0	(Azerbaijan) Qarabağ	Fontvieille, Monaco
19:00 CEST (UTC+2)	Wallace (yellow card) 40'; Carvalho (yellow card) 53'; L. Traoré 70'	Report	Agolli (yellow card) 76'	Stadium: Stade Louis II; Attendance: 6,165; Referee: Jakob Kehlet (Denmark)

5 November 2015 4	Qarabağ (Azerbaijan)	1–1	(France) Monaco	Baku, Azerbaijan
17:00 CET (UTC+1)	Armenteros 39', (yellow card) 67'	Report	Fabinho (yellow card) 51'; Cavaleiro 72'; Silva (yellow card) 89'	Stadium: Tofiq Bahramov Stadium; Attendance: 30,200; Referee: Cristian Balaj (Romania)

26 November 2015 5	Monaco (France)	0–2	(Belgium) Anderlecht	Fontvieille, Monaco
19:00 CET (UTC+1)	El Shaarawy (yellow card) 43'; Raggi (yellow card) 50'; Fabinho (yellow card) 66'	Report	N'Sakala (yellow card) 25'; Gillet 45+1'; Defour (yellow card) 58'; Praet (yellow card) 70'; Acheampong 78'; Proto (yellow card) 88'	Stadium: Stade Louis II; Attendance: 5,913; Referee: Manuel Gräfe (Germany)

10 December 2015 6	Tottenham Hotspur (England)	4–1	(France) Monaco	London, England
21:05 CET (UTC+1)	Lamela 2', 15', 38'; Bentaleb (yellow card) 50'; Carroll 78'	Report	Wallace (yellow card) 36'; Toulalan (yellow card) 74'; Dirar (yellow card) 74'; El Shaarawy 61'	Stadium: White Hart Lane; Attendance: 34,122; Referee: Ivan Bebek (Croatia)

== Statistics ==
=== Appearances and goals ===
As of match played 14 May 2016

No.	Pos	Nat	Player	Total		Ligue 1		Coupe de France		Coupe de la Ligue		Champions League/Europa League	
No.	Pos	Nat	Player	Apps	Goals	Apps	Goals	Apps	Goals	Apps	Goals	Apps	Goals
1	GK	(Croatia) CRO	Danijel Subašić	46	0	36	0	0	0	0	0	10	0
2	DF	(Brazil) BRA	Fabinho	47	8	34	6	3	2	1	0	9	0
4	DF	(Portugal) POR	Fábio Coentrão	19	3	13+2	3	0+1	0	0	0	3	0
5	DF	(Brazil) BRA	Jemerson	5	0	3+1	0	1	0	0	0	0	0
6	DF	(Portugal) POR	Ricardo Carvalho	44	2	33	2	2	0	1	0	8	0
7	MF	(Morocco) MAR	Nabil Dirar	28	2	20	2	0+1	0	0	0	4+3	0
8	MF	(Portugal) POR	João Moutinho	37	1	24+2	1	3	0	0	0	8	0
9	FW	(Brazil) BRA	Vágner Love	13	4	9+3	4	0+1	0	0	0	0	0
10	MF	(Portugal) POR	Bernardo Silva	44	7	22+10	7	3	0	1	0	8	0
11	FW	(Argentina) ARG	Guido Carrillo	40	5	15+16	4	1+1	0	0	0	0+7	1
12	MF	(France) FRA	Farès Bahlouli	11	2	2+6	1	1	1	0	0	0+2	0
13	DF	(Brazil) BRA	Wallace	34	1	25+1	1	2	0	1	0	5	0
14	MF	(France) FRA	Tiémoué Bakayoko	23	2	14+5	1	1+1	1	1	0	1	0
16	GK	(France) FRA	Paul Nardi	6	0	2	0	3	0	1	0	0	0
17	FW	(Portugal) POR	Ivan Cavaleiro	19	3	6+6	1	0	0	1	0	5+1	2
18	MF	(Portugal) POR	Hélder Costa	28	5	15+10	3	3	2	0	0	0	0
19	FW	(Ivory Coast) CIV	Lacina Traoré	27	10	11+8	3	2	5	0	0	5+1	2
20	MF	(Croatia) CRO	Mario Pašalić	29	7	12+4	3	1+2	2	1	0	8+1	2
21	DF	(Nigeria) NGR	Elderson Echiéjilé	27	1	18+2	0	0	0	0+1	0	3+3	1
23	MF	(Mali) MLI	Adama Traoré	8	0	4+2	0	0	0	0	0	1+1	0
24	DF	(Italy) ITA	Andrea Raggi	44	4	29+2	2	3	1	1	0	9	1
27	MF	(France) FRA	Thomas Lemar	34	5	21+5	5	1+1	0	0+1	0	2+3	0
28	MF	(France) FRA	Jérémy Toulalan	36	0	25	0	1	0	0+1	0	9	0
29	FW	(France) FRA	Kylian Mbappé	13	1	2+8	1	1	0	1	0	0+1	0
34	DF	(France) FRA	Raphaël Diarra	1	0	0	0	0	0	0	0	0+1	0
38	DF	(Mali) MLI	Almamy Touré	13	3	9+1	3	1	0	0	0	1+1	0
39	FW	(France) FRA	Kylian Mbappe	6	0	0+3	0	0+1	0	1	0	0+1	0
	MF	(France) FRA	Mohamed Chaïbi	2	0	0+1	0	0+1	0	0	0	0	0
Players away from the club on loan:
29	MF	(Brazil) BRA	Gabriel Boschilia	6	0	1+4	0	0	0	1	0	0	0
25	MF	(Portugal) POR	Rony Lopes	2	0	2	0	0	0	0	0	0	0
Players who appeared for Monaco no longer at the club:
3	DF	(France) FRA	Layvin Kurzawa	6	3	3	1	0	0	0	0	3	2
9	FW	(France) FRA	Anthony Martial	7	1	2+1	0	0	0	0	0	4	1
22	FW	(Italy) ITA	Stephan El Shaarawy	24	3	7+8	0	0	0	0	0	4+5	3

=== Goalscorers ===
As of match played 14 May 2016

Place	Position	Nation	Number	Name	Ligue 1	Coupe de France	Coupe de la Ligue	Champions League/Europa League	Total
1	FW	(Ivory Coast)	19	Lacina Traoré	3	5	0	2	10
2	DF	(Brazil)	2	Fabinho	6	2	0	0	8
3	MF	(Portugal)	10	Bernardo Silva	7	0	0	0	7
3	MF	(Croatia)	20	Mario Pašalić	3	2	0	2	7
5	FW	(Argentina)	11	Guido Carrillo	4	0	0	1	5
5	MF	(France)	14	Thomas Lemar	5	0	0	0	5
5	MF	(Portugal)	18	Hélder Costa	3	2	0	0	5
8	FW	(Brazil)	9	Vágner Love	4	0	0	0	4
8	DF	(Italy)	24	Andrea Raggi	2	1	0	1	4
10	DF	(Mali)	38	Almamy Touré	3	0	0	0	3
10	DF	(France)	3	Layvin Kurzawa	1	0	0	2	3
10	FW	(Italy)	22	Stephan El Shaarawy	0	0	0	3	3
10	DF	(Portugal)	4	Fábio Coentrão	3	0	0	0	3
10	FW	(Portugal)	17	Ivan Cavaleiro	1	0	0	2	3
15	MF	(Morocco)	7	Nabil Dirar	2	0	0	0	2
15	DF	(Portugal)	6	Ricardo Carvalho	2	0	0	0	2
15	MF	(France)	14	Tiémoué Bakayoko	1	1	0	0	2
18	DF	(Brazil)	13	Wallace	1	0	0	0	1
18	MF	(Portugal)	8	João Moutinho	1	0	0	0	1
18	FW	(France)	33	Kylian Mbappé	1	0	0	0	1
18	MF	(France)	12	Farès Bahlouli	1	0	0	0	1
18	MF	(France)	12	Farès Bahlouli	0	1	0	0	1
18	FW	(France)	9	Anthony Martial	0	0	0	1	1
18	DF	(Nigeria)	21	Elderson Echiéjilé	0	0	0	1	1
				Own goals	3	0	0	0	3
				TOTALS	57	14	0	15	86

=== Disciplinary record ===
As of match played 14 May 2016

N	P	Nat.	Name	Ligue 1			Coupe de France			Coupe de la Ligue			Champions League/Europa League			Total			Notes
N	P	Nat.	Name	Yellow card	Second yellow card	Red card	Yellow card	Second yellow card	Red card	Yellow card	Second yellow card	Red card	Yellow card	Second yellow card	Red card	Yellow card	Second yellow card	Red card	Notes
1	GK	(Croatia)	Danijel Subašić	3												3			
2	DF	(Brazil)	Fabinho	9			1						4			14			
3	DF	(France)	Layvin Kurzawa	1												1			
4	DF	(Portugal)	Fábio Coentrão	4												4			
5	DF	(Brazil)	Jemerson	2			1									3			
6	DF	(Portugal)	Ricardo Carvalho	8									1			9			
7	MF	(Morocco)	Nabil Dirar	1	1								2			3	1		
8	MF	(Portugal)	João Moutinho	3												3			
9	FW	(Brazil)	Vágner Love	1												1			
10	MF	(Portugal)	Bernardo Silva	7									2			9			
11	MF	(Argentina)	Guido Carrillo	3			1									4			
12	MF	(France)	Farès Bahlouli	1												1			
13	DF	(Brazil)	Wallace	6		1	1						3			10		1	
14	MF	(France)	Tiémoué Bakayoko	3												3			
17	FW	(Portugal)	Ivan Cavaleiro	1												1			
18	MF	(Portugal)	Hélder Costa	4												4			
19	FW	(Ivory Coast)	Lacina Traoré	4	1				1							4	1	1	
20	MF	(Croatia)	Mario Pašalić	1									3			4			
21	DF	(Nigeria)	Elderson Echiéjilé	4		1							2			6		1	
22	FW	(Italy)	Stephan El Shaarawy	1									1			2			
23	DF	(Mali)	Adama Traoré	1												1			
24	DF	(Italy)	Andrea Raggi	5						1			2			8			
27	MF	(France)	Thomas Lemar	1												1			
28	MF	(France)	Jérémy Toulalan	5									3			8			
29	MF	(Brazil)	Gabriel Boschilia							1						1			
33	FW	(France)	Kylian Mbappé	1												1			
38	DF	(Mali)	Almamy Touré	3												3			

Source: Match reports in Competitive matches
Ordered by (red card) , (second yellow card) and (yellow card)
(yellow card) = Number of bookings; (second yellow card) = Number of sending offs after a second yellow card; (red card) = Number of sending offs by a direct red card.
