= 2013–14 AS Monaco FC season =

Monaco
2013–14 season
- President: Dmitry Rybolovlev
- Head coach: Claudio Ranieri
- Stadium: Stade Louis II
- Ligue 1: 2nd
- Coupe de France: Semi-finals
- Coupe de la Ligue: Third round
- Top goalscorer: League: Emmanuel Rivière (10); All: Emmanuel Rivière (13)
- Highest home attendance: 16,384 vs PSG; 9 February 2014
- Lowest home attendance: 0 vs Toulouse; 23 August 2013
- Average home league attendance: 8,274
Home colours	Away colours	Third colours

The 2013–14 season was AS Monaco FC's first season back in Ligue 1 since relegation from Ligue 1 in 2011. They finished the season in second place, reached the semi-finals of the Coupe de France and the Third round of the Coupe de la Ligue.

== Season review ==
Monaco started the season with –2 points following crowd troubles at the end of the 2012–13 season.

Billionaire owner Dmitry Rybolovlev backed an incredible spending spree that saw the club spend close to €150 million in the summer transfer window, including around €50 million on Radamel Falcao. The spending spree meant that expectations were high for the club despite participating in Ligue 2 the season prior. The Monegasque had a great season in Ligue 1, finishing in second place behind Paris Saint-Germain. The second place meant the side qualified for the 2014–15 UEFA Champions League group stage after an extended absence from the competition.

== Squad ==
Note: Flags indicate national team as defined under FIFA eligibility rules; some limited exceptions apply. Players may hold more than one non-FIFA nationality.

No.	Pos.	Nation	Player
1	GK	CRO	Danijel Subašić
2	DF	BRA	Fabinho (on loan from Rio Ave)
3	DF	FRA	Layvin Kurzawa
5	DF	TUN	Aymen Abdennour (on loan from Toulouse)
6	DF	POR	Ricardo Carvalho
7	MF	MAR	Nabil Dirar
8	MF	POR	João Moutinho
9	FW	COL	Radamel Falcao
10	MF	COL	James Rodríguez
11	MF	ARG	Lucas Ocampos
15	FW	BUL	Dimitar Berbatov
16	GK	ARG	Sergio Romero (on loan from Sampdoria)
17	MF	BEL	Yannick Carrasco
18	FW	FRA	Valère Germain (3rd captain)
19	MF	MAR	Mounir Obbadi

No.	Pos.	Nation	Player
20	DF	FRA	Nicolas Isimat-Mirin
21	DF	NGR	Elderson Echiéjilé
22	DF	FRA	Eric Abidal (captain)
23	FW	FRA	Anthony Martial
24	DF	ITA	Andrea Raggi
25	MF	FRA	Jessy Pi
27	MF	FRA	Geoffrey Kondogbia
28	MF	FRA	Jérémy Toulalan (vice-captain)
29	FW	MTQ	Emmanuel Rivière
30	GK	ITA	Flavio Roma
31	DF	GER	Andreas Wolf
40	GK	FRA	Marc-Aurèle Caillard
41	GK	FRA	Axel Maraval
—	FW	NED	Nacer Barazite
—	GK	FRA	Sébastien Chabbert

=== Out on loan ===
Note: Flags indicate national team as defined under FIFA eligibility rules; some limited exceptions apply. Players may hold more than one non-FIFA nationality.

No.	Pos.	Nation	Player
4	DF	ALG	Carl Medjani (loan to Valenciennes)
4	DF	ESP	Borja López (loan to Rayo Vallecano)
13	DF	FRA	Jérémy Labor (loan to FC Brussels)
16	GK	FRA	Martin Sourzac (loan to FC Brussels)
21	DF	URU	Gary Kagelmacher (loan to Valenciennes)
25	FW	ITA	Gaetano Monachello (loan to Cercle Brugge)
26	FW	FRA	Terence Makengo (loan to Châteauroux)

No.	Pos.	Nation	Player
27	MF	CGO	Delvin N'Dinga (loan to Olympiacos)
28	MF	CMR	Edgar Salli (loan to Lens)
32	DF	COD	Marcel Tisserand (loan to Lens)
—	DF	FRA	Jérôme Phojo (loan to Bastia)
—	MF	FRA	Aadil Assana (loan to Bastia)
—	MF	FRA	Dominique Pandor (loan to Stade Brestois)
—	MF	FRA	Tristan Dingomé (loan to Le Havre)

== Transfers ==
=== Summer ===
In:

No.	Pos.	Nat.	Name	Age	EU	Moving from	Type	Transfer window	Ends	Transfer fee	Source
2	DF	(Brazil)	Fabinho	19	EU	Rio Ave (Portugal)	Loan	Summer	2014	N/A	AS Monaco FC
4	DF	(Spain)	Borja López	19	EU	Sporting Gijón (Spain)	Transfer	Summer	2017	€2.2M	Sky Sports
6	DF	(Portugal)	Ricardo Carvalho	35	EU	Real Madrid (Spain)	Transfer	Summer	2014	Free	AS Monaco
8	MF	(Portugal)	João Moutinho	26	EU	Porto (Portugal)	Transfer	Summer	2018	€25M	Goal
9	FW	(Colombia)	Radamel Falcao	27	Non-EU	Atlético Madrid (Spain)	Transfer	Summer	2018	€60M	AS Monaco
10	MF	(Colombia)	James Rodríguez	21	Non-EU	Porto (Portugal)	Transfer	Summer	2018	€45M	Goal
16	GK	(Argentina)	Sergio Romero	26	Non-EU	Sampdoria (Italy)	Loan	Summer	2014	N/A	AS Monaco
20	MF	(Greece)	Alexandros Tziolis	28	EU	APOEL (Cyprus)	Loan Return	Summer	N/A	N/A	
20	DF	(France)	Nicolas Isimat-Mirin	21	EU	Valenciennes	Transfer	Summer	2017	N/A	AS Monaco
22	DF	(France)	Eric Abidal	33	EU	Barcelona (Spain)	Transfer	Summer	2016	Free	AS Monaco
23	FW	(France)	Anthony Martial	17	EU	Lyon	Transfer	Summer	2018	€5M	AS Monaco
25	FW	(Italy)	Gaetano Monachello	19	EU	Olympiakos Nicosia (Cyprus)	Transfer	Summer	2016	N/A	AS Monaco
28	MF	(France)	Jérémy Toulalan	29	EU	Málaga (Spain)	Transfer	Summer	2015	€5M	AS Monaco
	MF	(Republic of the Congo)	Chris Malonga	25	EU	Lausanne-Sport (Switzerland)	Loan Return	Summer	N/A	N/A	
	MF	(France)	Florian Pinteaux	21	EU	Sedan	Loan Return	Summer	N/A	N/A	
	MF	(France)	Aadil Assana	20	EU	Clermont	Loan Return	Summer	N/A	N/A	
	MF	(France)	Terence Makengo	21	EU	Auxerre	Loan Return	Summer	N/A	N/A	
	FW	(Netherlands)	Nacer Barazite	23	EU	Austria Wien	Loan Return	Summer	N/A	N/A	
	MF	(France)	Jessy Pi	19	EU	Youth system	Promoted	Summer	N/A	N/A	
	DF	(Democratic Republic of the Congo)	Marcel Tisserand	20	EU	Youth system	Promoted	Summer	N/A	N/A	
	GK	(France)	Axel Maraval	19	EU	Youth system	Promoted	Summer	N/A	N/A	
	DF	(France)	Yarouba Cissako	18	EU	Youth system	Promoted	Summer	N/A	N/A	
	MF	(Morocco)	Fawzi Ouaamar	20	EU	Youth system	Promoted	Summer	N/A	N/A	
	MF	(France)	Dominique Pandor	20	EU	Youth system	Promoted	Summer	N/A	N/A	

Out:

No.	Pos.	Nat.	Name	Age	EU	Moving to	Type	Transfer window	Transfer fee	Source
2	DF	(France)	Dennis Appiah	21	EU	Caen	Transfer	Summer	Free	
4	DF	(Algeria)	Carl Medjani	28	EU	Olympiacos (Greece)	Loan	Summer	N/A	L'Equipe
6	MF	(France)	Stéphane Dumont	30	EU	Free agent	Contract termination	Summer	N/A	AS Monaco FC
9	FW	(Uruguay)	Sebastián Ribas	25	EU	Genoa (Italy)	Loan return	Summer	N/A	La Repubblica
11	FW	(Senegal)	Ibrahima Touré	27	EU	Al-Nasr (United Arab Emirates)	Transfer	Summer	N/A	AS Monaco
12	DF	(Brazil)	Adriano	31	EU	Free agent	Released	Summer	N/A	AS Monaco
13	DF	(France)	Jérémy Labor	21	EU	Brussels (Belgium)	Loan	Summer	N/A	AS Monaco
16	GK	(France)	Martin Sourzac	21	EU	Brussels (Belgium)	Loan	Summer	N/A	AS Monaco
20	MF	(Sweden)	Emir Bajrami	25	EU	Twente (Netherlands)	Loan return	Summer	N/A	
20	MF	(Greece)	Alexandros Tziolis	28	EU	PAOK (Greece)	Transfer	Summer	Free	Sport24
21	DF	(Uruguay)	Gary Kagelmacher	25	EU	Valenciennes	Loan	Summer	N/A	
23	MF	(France)	Nampalys Mendy	21	EU	Nice	Transfer	Summer	Free	
25	FW	(Italy)	Gaetano Monachello	19	EU	Cercle Brugge (Belgium)	Loan	Summer	N/A	AS Monaco
28	MF	(Cameroon)	Edgar Salli	20	EU	Lens	Loan	Summer	N/A	AS Monaco
	DF	(France)	Jérôme Phojo	20	EU	Bastia	Loan	Summer	N/A	
	MF	(France)	Aadil Assana	20	EU	Bastia	Loan	Summer	N/A	
	MF	(France)	Tristan Dingomé	22	EU	Le Havre	Loan	Summer	N/A	
	MF	(France)	Dominique Pandor	20	EU	Brest	Loan	Summer	N/A	
	MF	(France)	Florian Pinteaux	21	EU	Le Havre	Transfer	Summer	Free	
	MF	(Republic of the Congo)	Chris Malonga	26	EU	Vitória de Guimarães (Portugal)	Transfer	Summer	Free	France Football

=== Winter ===
In:

No.	Pos.	Nat.	Name	Age	EU	Moving from	Type	Transfer window	Ends	Transfer fee	Source
5	DF	(France)	Aymen Abdennour	23	EU	Toulouse	Loan	Winter	2014	N/A	AS Monaco FC
15	FW	(Bulgaria)	Dimitar Berbatov	33	EU	Fulham (England)	Transfer	Winter	2015	N/A	AS Monaco
21	DF	(Nigeria)	Elderson Echiéjilé	25	EU	Braga (Portugal)	Transfer	Winter	2018	N/A	BBC Sport
	FW	(Ivory Coast)	Lacina Traoré	23	EU	Anzhi Makhachkala (Russia)	Transfer	Winter	2018	N/A	AS Monaco

Out:

No.	Pos.	Nat.	Name	Age	EU	Moving to	Type	Transfer window	Transfer fee	Source
4	DF	(Algeria)	Carl Medjani	28	EU	Valenciennes	Loan	Winter	N/A	Goal
4	DF	(Spain)	Borja López	19	EU	Rayo Vallecano (Spain)	Loan	Winter	N/A	Rayoherald
5	MF	(France)	Gary Coulibaly	27	EU	Laval	Released	Winter	N/A	AS Monaco FC
14	MF	(Denmark)	Jakob Poulsen	30	EU	Midtjylland (Denmark)	Transfer	Winter	N/A	FC Midtjylland
32	DF	(Democratic Republic of the Congo)	Marcel Tisserand	21	EU	Lens	Loan	Winter	N/A	RC Lens
	FW	(Ivory Coast)	Lacina Traoré	23	EU	Everton (England)	Loan	Winter	N/A	Everton FC

== Competitions ==
=== Friendlies ===
14 July 2013	Fortuna Düsseldorf	3–2	Monaco	Düsseldorf, Germany
17:30 CEST (UTC+2)	Reisinger 22', 53'; Wegkamp 44'	Report	Rodríguez 56'; Falcao 81'	Stadium: Esprit Arena

20 July 2013	FC Augsburg	1–0	Monaco	Memmingen, Germany
16:00 CEST (UTC+2)	Mölders 14'	Report		Stadium: Memminger Arena

27 July 2013	Leicester City	0–3	Monaco	Leicester, England
17:15 CEST (UTC+2)		[ Report]	Kurzawa 7'; Falcao 40'; Tisserand 85'	Stadium: King Power Stadium; Attendance: 10,663; Referee: Kevin Friend

3 August 2013	Monaco	5–2	Tottenham Hotspur	Fontvieille, Monaco
CEST (UTC+2)	Raggi 14'; Ocampos 47'; Falcao 48', 64'; Obbadi 70'	Report	Kane 57'; Townsend 84'	Stadium: Stade Louis II

=== Ligue 1 ===
==== League table ====
Pos	Team	Pld	W	D	L	GF	GA	GD	Pts	Qualification or relegation
1	Paris Saint-Germain (C)	38	27	8	3	84	23	+61	89	Qualification for the Champions League group stage (Note: Paris Saint-Germain qualified for the Europa League third qualifying round by winning the 2013–14 Coupe de la Ligue. However, since they already qualified for European competition based on their league position, the spots awarded to the cup winners were passed down the league.)
2	Monaco (Note: Monaco were deducted 2 points due to poor fan behavior in a match last season. However this was overturned on 13 August 2013.)	38	23	11	4	63	31	+32	80	Qualification for the Champions League group stage
3	Lille	38	20	11	7	46	26	+20	71	Qualification for the Champions League third qualifying round
4	Saint-Étienne	38	20	9	9	56	34	+22	69	Qualification for the Europa League play-off round
5	Lyon	38	17	10	11	56	44	+12	61	Qualification for the Europa League third qualifying round

Source: Ligue 1
Rules for classification: 1) Points; 2) Goal difference; 3) Number of goals scored
(C) Champions

==== Results summary ====
Overall								Home						Away					
Pld	W	D	L	GF	GA	GD	Pts	W	D	L	GF	GA	GD	W	D	L	GF	GA	GD
38	23	11	4	63	31	+32	80	12	6	1	32	14	+18	11	5	3	31	17	+14

Last updated: 19 May 2014.
Source: [#Matches

==== Results by round ====
Round	1	2	3	4	5	6	7	8	9	10	11	12	13	14	15	16	17	18	19	20	21	22	23	24	25	26	27	28	29	30	31	32	33	34	35	36	37	38
Ground	A	H	H	A	H	A	H	A	H	A	H	A	H	A	H	A	H	A	H	A	A	H	A	H	A	H	A	H	A	H	A	H	A	H	A	H	A	H
Result	W	W	D	W	W	D	W	D	W	D	W	L	D	W	W	W	W	W	L	D	W	W	D	D	W	W	L	W	W	D	L	W	W	W	W	D	W	D
Position	5	2	2	1	1	1	1	1	1	2	2	3	3	3	3	3	2	2	2	2	2	2	2	2	2	2	2	2	2	2	2	2	2	2	2	2	2	2

Source: Soccerway
A = Away; H = Home; W = Win; D = Draw; L = Loss

==== Matches ====
10 August 2013 1	Bordeaux	0–2	Monaco	Bordeaux
21:00 CEST (UTC+2)		Report	Rivière 82'; Falcao 87'	Stadium: Stade Chaban Delmas; Attendance: 32,158; Referee: Laurent Duhamel

18 August 2013 2	Monaco	4–1	Montpellier	Fontvieille
14:00 CEST (UTC+2)	Falcao 18' (pen.); Rivière 44', 58', 81'	Report	Montaño 24'; Congré (red card) 64'	Stadium: Stade Louis II; Attendance: Benoît Millot; Referee: 14,753

23 August 2013 3	Monaco	0–0	Toulouse	Fontvieille
20:30 CEST (UTC+2)	Rivière (yellow card) 50'	Report	Trejo (yellow card) 25'; Abdennour (yellow card) 77'; Didot (yellow card) 90'	Stadium: Stade Louis II; Attendance: 0 Referee: Philippe Kalt

1 September 2013 4	Marseille	1–2	Monaco	Marseille
21:00 CEST (UTC+2)	Mendes 43'; Ayew (yellow card) 50'; Mendy (yellow card) 56'	Report	Carvalho (yellow card) 31'; Fabinho (yellow card) 39'; Falcao 47'; Obbadi (yellow card) 66'; Rivière 79'	Stadium: Stade Vélodrome; Attendance: 44,995; Referee: Ruddy Buquet

15 September 2013 5	Monaco	1–0	Lorient	Fontvieille
14:00 CEST (UTC+2)	Falcao 6' (pen.); Kurzawa (yellow card) 22'; Carrasco (yellow card) 30'; Kondogbia (yellow card) 76'	Report	Koné (yellow card) 1'; Audard (yellow card) 4'; Abdullah (yellow card) 60'	Stadium: Stade Louis II; Attendance: 8,186; Referee: Alexandre Castro

22 September 2013 6	Paris Saint-Germain	1–1	Monaco	Paris
21:00 CEST (UTC+2)	Ibrahimović 5'; Marquinhos (yellow card) 38'	Report	Falcao 20'; Fabinho (yellow card) 36'; Obbadi (yellow card) 63'; Ocampos (yellow card) 90+4'	Stadium: Parc des Princes; Attendance: 45.416; Referee: Tony Chapron

25 September 2013 7	Monaco	3–0	Bastia	Fontvieille
21:00 CEST (UTC+2)	Rivière 39'; Falcao 41', 89', (yellow card) 90+2'	Report	Romaric (yellow card) 77'	Stadium: Stade Louis II; Attendance: 7,643; Referee: Lionel Jaffredo

29 September 2013 8	Stade Reims	1–1	Monaco	Reims
21:00 CEST (UTC+2)	Devaux 4'; Weber (yellow card) 81'; Turan (yellow card) 86' (red card) 88'	Report	Moutinho 13'; Ocampos (yellow card) 24'	Stadium: Stade Auguste-Delaune; Attendance: 20,032; Referee: Benoît Bastian

5 October 2013 9	Monaco	2–1	Saint-Étienne	Fontvieille
17:00 CEST (UTC+2)	Carrasco 15'; Falcao (yellow card) 32'; Ocampos 87'	Report	Ghoulam (yellow card) 38'; Hamouma 49', (yellow card) 58'; Mollo (yellow card) 65'; Gradel (yellow card) 87'; Lemoine (yellow card) 90'; Corgnet (yellow card) 90+2'	Stadium: Stade Louis II; Attendance: 11,773; Referee: Fredy Fautrel

20 October 2013 10	Sochaux	2–2	Monaco	Montbéliard
13:00 CEST (UTC+2)	Bakambu 57'; Lopy 69', (yellow card) 75'; Roudet (yellow card) 77'	Report	Carrasco 5', 15'; Falcao (yellow card) 90'	Stadium: Stade Auguste Bonal; Attendance: 15,041; Referee: Olivier Thual

27 October 2013 11	Monaco	2–1	Lyon	Fontvieille
16:00 CET (UTC+1)	Carrasco (yellow card) 12'; Oddadi 28'; Falcao 36'	Report	Gomis 62'; Grenier (yellow card) 78'; Gonalons (yellow card) 82'; Malbranque (yellow card) 90+1'	Stadium: Stade Louis II; Attendance: 11,352; Referee: Laurent Duhamel

3 November 2013 12	Lille	2–0	Monaco	Villeneuve d'Ascq
20:00CET (UTC+1)	Sidibé (yellow card) 23'; Roux 27', 71'; Meïté (yellow card) 86'	Report	Moutinho (yellow card) 75'; Falcao (yellow card) 88'	Stadium: Stade Pierre-Mauroy; Attendance: 43,880; Referee: Wilfried Bien

8 November 2013 13	Monaco	1–1	Evian	Fontvieille
20:30CET (UTC+1)	Falcao 27'; Carvalho (yellow card) 82'	Report	Wass 20'; Tié Bi (yellow card) 22'; Sougou (yellow card) 87'	Stadium: Stade Louis II; Attendance: 6,507; Referee: Saïd Ennjimi

24 November 2013 14	Nantes	0–1	Monaco	Nantes
21:00 CET (UTC+1)		Report	Obbadi 70'	Stadium: Stade de la Beaujoire; Attendance: 32,195; Referee: Tony Chapron

30 November 2013 15	Monaco	2–0	Rennes	Fontvieille
17:00 CET (UTC+1)	Rodríguez 19'; Martial 44'	Report		Stadium: Stade Louis II; Attendance: Amuary Delerue; Referee: 6,227

3 December 2013 16	Nice	0–3	Monaco	Nice
21:00 CET (UTC+1)		Report	Rodríguez 5'; Rivière 23'; Ocampos 89'	Stadium: Allianz Riviera; Attendance: 28,241; Referee: Stephane Lannoy

8 December 2013 17	Monaco	1–0	Ajaccio	Fontvieille
21:00 CET (UTC+1)	Rivière 75'	[uk.soccerway.com/matches/2013/12/08/france/ligue-1/association-sportive-monaco-fc/athletic-club-ajaccien/1479211/ Report]	Pierazzi (yellow card) 25' (yellow-red card) 62'	Stadium: Stade Louis II; Attendance: 5,619; Referee: Antony Gautier

14 December 2013 18	Guingamp	0–2	Monaco	Guingamp
20:00 CET (UTC+1)		Report	Martial 4'; Kurzawa 42'	Stadium: Stade du Roudourou; Attendance: 14,576; Referee: Laurent Duhamel

20 December 2013 19	Monaco	1–2	Valenciennes	Fontvieille
20:30 CET (UTC+1)	Rodríguez 84'	Report	Abidal 30' (o.g.); Ducourtioux 58'	Stadium: Stade Louis II; Attendance: 6,299; Referee: Olivier Thual

10 January 2014 20	Montpellier	1–1	Monaco	Montpellier
20:30 CET (UTC+1)	Niang 68'	Report	Kurzawa 52'	Stadium: Stade de la Mosson; Attendance: 15,476; Referee: Amuary Delerue

19 January 2014 21	Toulouse	0–2	Monaco	Toulouse
17:00 CET (UTC+1)		Report	Kurzawa 36'; Ocampos 88'	Stadium: Stadium Municipal; Attendance: 16,163; Referee: Tony Chapron

26 January 2014 22	Monaco	2–0	Marseille	Fontvieille
21:00 CET (UTC+1)	Germain 41'; Rivière 57'	Report		Stadium: Stade Louis II; Attendance: 11,284; Referee: Clement Turpin

1 February 2014 23	Lorient	2–2	Monaco	Lorient
16:30 CET (UTC+1)	Aboubakar 12'; Aliadière 73'	Report	Germain 41'; Kurzawa 87'	Stadium: Stade du Moustoir; Attendance: 14,050; Referee: Sebastian Desiage

9 February 2014 24	Monaco	1–1	Paris Saint-Germain	Fontvieille
21:00 CET (UTC+1)	Silva 74' (o.g.)	Report	Pastore 8'	Stadium: Stade Louis II; Attendance: 16,384; Referee: Stephane Lannoy

15 February 2014 25	Bastia	0–2	Monaco	Bastia
17:00 CET (UTC+1)		Report	Rodríguez 45', 77'	Stadium: Stade Armand Cesari; Attendance: 13,816; Referee: Ruddy Buquet

21 February 2014 26	Monaco	3–2	Reims	Fontvieille
20:30 CET (UTC+1)	Germain 8'; Toulalan 63'; Kurzawa 90+5'	Report	Oniangue 53', 71'; Mandi (red card) 84'	Stadium: Stade Louis II; Attendance: 6,127; Referee: Antony Gautier

1 March 2014 27	Saint-Étienne	2–0	Monaco	Saint-Étienne
17:00 CET (UTC+1)	Lemoine 17'; Hamouma 66'	Report		Stadium: Stade Geoffroy-Guichard; Attendance: 34,034; Referee: Clement Turpin

8 March 2014 28	Monaco	2–1	Sochaux	Fontvieille
20:00 CET (UTC+1)	Berbatov 6'; Rodríguez 55' (pen.)	Summary	Butin 83'; Ayew (red card) 85'	Stadium: Stade Louis II; Attendance: 7,654; Referee: Mikael Lesage

16 March 2014 29	Lyon	2–3	Monaco	Lyon
CET (UTC+1)	Briand 32', 78'	Summary	Germain 4'; Rodríguez 27'; Berbatov 52'	Stadium: Stade de Gerland; Attendance: 35,062; Referee: Fredy Fautrel

23 March 2014 30	Monaco	1–1	Lille	Fontvieille
21:00 CET (UTC+1)	Obbadi 4'	Report	Origi 38'	Stadium: Stade Louis II; Attendance: 7,157; Referee: Nicolas Rainville

29 March 2014 31	Evian	1–0	Monaco	Annecy
20:00 CEST (UTC+2)	Mongongu 84' (pen.)	Summary		Stadium: Parc des Sports; Attendance: 11,820; Referee: Lionel Jaffredo

6 April 2014 32	Monaco	3–1	Nantes	Fontvieille
21:00 CEST (UTC+2)	Rodríguez 18', 76' (pen.); Raggi 72'	Report	Bedoya 78'	Stadium: Stade Louis II; Attendance: 6,164; Referee: Benoît Millot

12 April 2014 33	Rennes	0–1	Monaco	Rennes
20:00 CEST (UTC+2)		Report	Rivière 55'	Stadium: Stade de la Route de Lorient; Attendance: 21,643; Referee: Ruddy Buquet

20 April 2014 34	Monaco	1–0	Nice	Fontvieille
14:00 CEST (UTC+2)	Berbatov 5'	Report		Stadium: Stade Louis II; Attendance: 8,500; Referee: Laurent Duhamel

26 April 2014 35	Ajaccio	1–4	Monaco	Ajaccio
17:00 CEST (UTC+2)	Tallo 75'	Report	Berbatov 53', 74'; Kondogbia 88'; Ocampos 90+2'	Stadium: Stade François Coty; Attendance: 6,622; Referee: Said Ennjimi

7 May 2014 36	Monaco	1–1	Guingamp	Fontvieille
19:00 CEST (UTC+2)	Berbatov	Report	Atık 85'; Diallo (red card) 88'	Stadium: Stade Louis II; Attendance: 7,683; Referee: Stephane Lannoy

10 May 2014 37	Valenciennes	1–2	Monaco	Valenciennes
21:00 CEST (UTC+2)	Doumbia 70'	Report	Germain 40'; Dirar 87'	Stadium: Stade du Hainaut; Attendance: 13,006; Referee: Bartolomeu Varela

17 May 2014 38	Monaco	1–1	Bordeaux	Fontvieille
21:00 CEST (UTC+2)	Ocampos 69'	Report	Hoarau 15'	Stadium: Stade Louis II; Attendance: 7,896; Referee: Tony Chapron

=== Coupe de la Ligue ===
30 October 2013 Third round	Reims	1–0	Monaco	Reims
19:55 CEST	Devaux 34'; Ca (yellow card) 38'	Report	Kondogbia (yellow card) 25'; Ocampos (yellow card) 38'; Fabinho (yellow card) 71'	Stadium: Stade Auguste Delaune; Attendance: 16,731; Referee: Bartolomeu Varela

=== Coupe de France ===
5 January 2014 Round of 64	Vannes	2–3	Monaco	Vannes
17:00 CET (UTC+1)	Cakin 1'; Aguemon 35'	Summary	Falcao 3'; Rodríguez 41'; Carrasco 86'	Stadium: Stade de la Rabine; Attendance: 8,708; Referee: Sébastien Desiage

22 January 2014 Round of 32	Monts	0–3	Monaco	Lyon
17:00 CET (UTC+1)		Summary	Falcao 29'; Rivière 63', 72'	Stadium: Stade de Gerland; Attendance: 5,850; Referee: Philippe Kalt

12 February 2014 Round of 16	Nice	0–1 (a.e.t.)	Monaco	Nice
20:55 CET (UTC+1)	Kolodziejczak (red card) 48'	Report	Berbatov 114'	Stadium: Allianz Riviera; Attendance: 8,708; Referee: Nicolas Rainville

26 March 2014 Quarter-finals	Monaco	6–0	Lens	Fontvieille
20:55 CET (UTC+1)	Ocampos 17', 67'; Berbatov 41'; Rivière 54'; Fabinho 58'; Kondogbia 85'	Summary		Stadium: Stade Louis II; Attendance: 6,000; Referee: Benoît Bastien

16 April 2014 Semi-finals	Guingamp	3–1 (a.e.t.)	Monaco	Guingamp
21:00 CET (UTC+1)	Yatabaré 6', 117'; Atık 112'	Summary	Berbatov 36'	Stadium: Stade du Roudourou; Attendance: 15,758; Referee: Antony Gautier

== Squad statistics ==
As of Match played 17 May 2014

=== Appearances and goals ===
No.	Pos	Nat	Player	Total		Ligue 1		Coupe de France		Coupe de la Ligue	
No.	Pos	Nat	Player	Apps	Goals	Apps	Goals	Apps	Goals	Apps	Goals
1	GK	(Croatia) CRO	Danijel Subašić	35	0	35+0	0	0+0	0	0+0	0
2	DF	(Brazil) BRA	Fabinho	31	1	21+5	0	4+0	1	1+0	0
3	DF	(France) FRA	Layvin Kurzawa	29	5	28+0	5	1+0	0	0+0	0
5	DF	(Tunisia) TUN	Aymen Abdennour	6	0	6+0	0	0+0	0	0+0	0
6	DF	(Portugal) POR	Ricardo Carvalho	39	0	36+0	0	3+0	0	0+0	0
7	MF	(Morocco) MAR	Nabil Dirar	13	1	2+9	1	1+1	0	0+0	0
8	MF	(Portugal) POR	João Moutinho	34	1	30+1	1	3+0	0	0+0	0
9	FW	(Colombia) COL	Radamel Falcao	19	11	16+1	9	2+0	2	0+0	0
10	MF	(Colombia) COL	James Rodríguez	38	10	30+4	9	2+1	1	0+1	0
11	FW	(Argentina) ARG	Lucas Ocampos	39	7	11+23	5	3+1	2	1+0	0
15	FW	(Bulgaria) BUL	Dimitar Berbatov	15	9	9+3	6	2+1	3	0+0	0
16	GK	(Argentina) ARG	Sergio Romero	9	0	2+1	0	5+0	0	1+0	0
17	FW	(Belgium) BEL	Yannick Carrasco	22	4	14+4	3	3+1	1	0+0	0
18	MF	(France) FRA	Valère Germain	26	5	14+9	5	2+0	0	1+0	0
19	MF	(Morocco) MAR	Mounir Obbadi	34	3	28+3	3	2+1	0	0+0	0
20	DF	(France) FRA	Nicolas Isimat-Mirin	11	0	5+1	0	4+0	0	1+0	0
21	DF	(Nigeria) NGR	Elderson Echiéjilé	7	0	5+0	0	2+0	0	0+0	0
22	DF	(France) FRA	Eric Abidal	29	0	26+0	0	3+0	0	0+0	0
23	FW	(France) FRA	Anthony Martial	15	2	8+3	2	1+2	0	0+1	0
24	DF	(Italy) ITA	Andrea Raggi	33	1	22+6	1	3+1	0	1+0	0
25	MF	(France) FRA	Jessy Pi	6	0	2+3	0	0+0	0	0+1	0
27	MF	(France) FRA	Geoffrey Kondogbia	31	2	16+10	1	2+2	1	1+0	0
28	MF	(France) FRA	Jérémy Toulalan	35	1	29+0	1	5+0	0	1+0	0
29	FW	(France) FRA	Emmanuel Rivière	36	13	19+11	10	2+3	3	1+0	0
30	GK	(Italy) ITA	Flavio Roma	1	0	1+0	0	0+0	0	0+0	0
31	DF	(Germany) GER	Andreas Wolf	1	0	0+1	0	0+0	0	0+0	0
Players away from the club on loan:
4	DF	(Spain) ESP	Borja López	2	0	0+1	0	0+0	0	1+0	0
27	MF	(Republic of the Congo) CGO	Delvin N'Dinga	2	0	0+2	0	0+0	0	0+0	0
32	DF	(Democratic Republic of the Congo) COD	Marcel Tisserand	6	0	2+4	0	0+0	0	0+0	0
	FW	(Ivory Coast) CIV	Lacina Traoré	0	0	0+0	0	0+0	0	0+0	0
Players who appeared for Monaco no longer at the club:
14	MF	(Denmark) DEN	Jakob Poulsen	1	0	0+0	0	0+0	0	1+0	0

=== Top scorers ===
Place	Position	Nation	Number	Name	Ligue 1	Coupe de France	Coupe de la Ligue	Total
1	FW	(France)	29	Emmanuel Rivière	10	3	0	13
2	FW	(Colombia)	9	Radamel Falcao	9	2	0	11
3	MF	(Colombia)	10	James Rodríguez	9	1	0	10
4	FW	(Bulgaria)	15	Dimitar Berbatov	6	3	0	9
5	FW	(Argentina)	11	Lucas Ocampos	5	2	0	7
6	DF	(France)	3	Layvin Kurzawa	5	0	0	5
6	MF	(France)	18	Valère Germain	5	0	0	5
8	FW	(Belgium)	17	Yannick Carrasco	3	1	0	4
9	FW	(Morocco)	19	Mounir Obbadi	3	0	0	3
10	FW	(France)	23	Anthony Martial	2	0	0	2
10	MF	(France)	28	Geoffrey Kondogbia	1	1	0	2
12	FW	(Portugal)	8	João Moutinho	1	0	0	1
12	FW	(France)	28	Jérémy Toulalan	1	0	0	1
12	DF	(Italy)	24	Andrea Raggi	1	0	0	1
12	MF	(Morocco)	7	Nabil Dirar	1	0	0	1
12				Own goal	1	0	0	1
12	DF	(Brazil)	2	Fabinho	0	1	0	1
				TOTALS	63	14	0	77

=== Disciplinary record ===
Number	Nation	Position	Name	Ligue 1		Coupe de France		Coupe de la Ligue		Total	
Number	Nation	Position	Name	Yellow card	Red card	Yellow card	Red card	Yellow card	Red card	Yellow card	Red card
1	(Croatia)	GK	Danijel Subašić	2	0	0	0	0	0	2	0
2	(Brazil)	DF	Fabinho	3	0	0	0	1	0	4	0
3	(France)	DF	Layvin Kurzawa	3	0	0	0	0	0	3	0
5	(Tunisia)	DF	Aymen Abdennour	2	0	0	0	0	0	2	0
6	(Portugal)	DF	Ricardo Carvalho	8	0	0	0	0	0	8	0
8	(Portugal)	MF	João Moutinho	3	0	0	0	0	0	3	0
9	(Colombia)	FW	Radamel Falcao	5	0	0	0	0	0	5	0
10	(Colombia)	MF	James Rodríguez	1	0	0	0	0	0	1	0
11	(Argentina)	FW	Lucas Ocampos	3	0	0	0	1	0	4	0
15	(Bulgaria)	FW	Dimitar Berbatov	1	0	0	0	0	0	1	0
17	(Belgium)	FW	Yannick Carrasco	2	0	0	0	0	0	2	0
18	(France)	FW	Valère Germain	1	0	0	0	0	0	1	0
19	(Morocco)	MF	Mounir Obbadi	4	0	1	0	0	0	5	0
20	(France)	DF	Nicolas Isimat-Mirin	1	0	0	0	1	0	2	0
21	(Nigeria)	DF	Elderson Echiéjilé	2	0	0	0	1	0	3	0
22	(France)	DF	Eric Abidal	6	0	0	0	0	0	6	0
24	(Italy)	DF	Andrea Raggi	3	0	0	0	0	0	3	0
27	(France)	MF	Geoffrey Kondogbia	4	0	0	0	0	0	4	0
27	(Republic of the Congo)	MF	Delvin N'Dinga	1	0	0	0	1	0	2	0
28	(France)	MF	Jérémy Toulalan	6	0	1	0	0	0	7	0
29	(France)	FW	Emmanuel Rivière	4	0	0	0	0	0	4	0
			TOTALS	65	0	2	0	3	0	70	0
