= Tirard =

Tirard is a surname. Notable people with the surname include:

- Corentin Tirard (born 1995), French professional footballer
- Laurent Tirard (1967–2024), French film director and screenwriter
- Paul Tirard (1879–1945), French diplomat
- Pierre Tirard (1827–1893), French politician
- René Tirard (1899–1977), French sprinter
