= Emmanuel Rivière =

French footballer (born 1990)

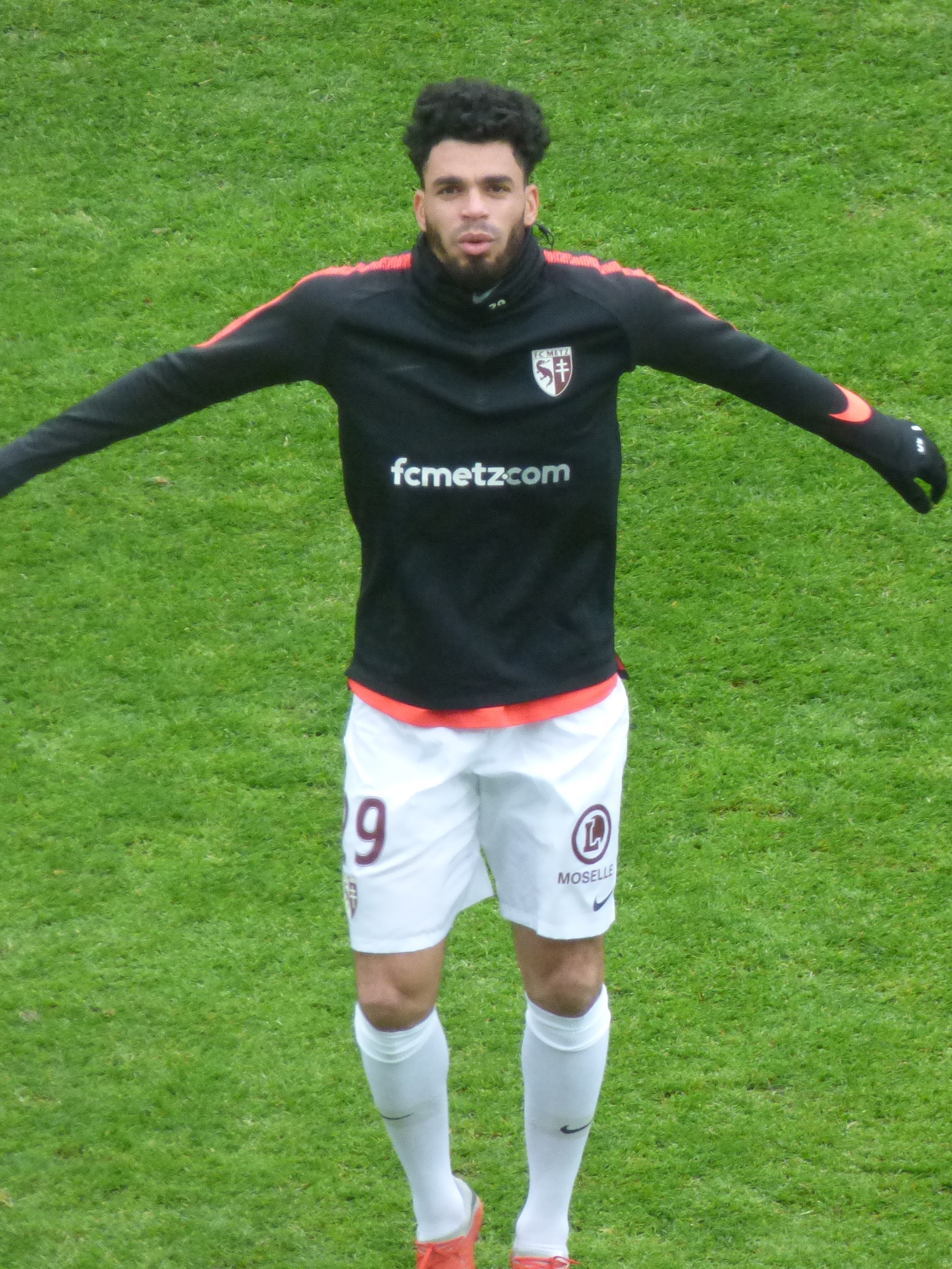
- Rivière playing for Metz in 2019

Personal information
- Full name: Emmanuel José Rivière
- Date of birth: 3 March 1990 (age 36)
- Place of birth: Le Lamentin, Martinique, France
- Height: 1.82 m (6 ft 0 in)
- Position: Striker

Youth career
- 1996–2005: Espoir Saint-Luce
- 2005–2009: Saint-Étienne

Senior career*
Years	Team	Apps	(Gls)
2009–2011	Saint-Étienne	73	(17)
2011–2013	Toulouse	44	(10)
2013–2014	Monaco	44	(14)
2014–2017	Newcastle United	26	(1)
2016–2017	→ Osasuna (loan)	15	(0)
2017–2019	Metz	43	(7)
2019–2020	Cosenza	31	(13)
2020–2021	Crotone	21	(1)
Total		297	(61)

International career
2010–2012	France U21	13	(5)
2019–2021	Martinique	5	(3)
- * Club domestic league appearances and goals

Emmanuel José Rivière (born 3 March 1990) is a French former professional footballer. Rivière primarily played in the lead striker role, but could also operate on wings. He was a French youth international having played at all levels before switching to represent the Martinique national team.

== Club career ==
=== Early career ===
Rivière began his football career playing on the French overseas department of Martinique playing for local side Espoir Sainte-Luce in the commune of Sainte-Luce. He attracted interest from French clubs on the mainland after his performances at the annual Coupe Nationale des 14 ans, which was held at the Clairefontaine academy. Notable clubs that scouted him included Paris Saint-Germain, Lyon and Saint-Étienne. The player signed for Saint-Étienne citing the club's history stating, "The ASSE is legendary in Martinique. They're a very big club. My family was happy to see me sign here. My father, who follows a lot of football, talks about them often."

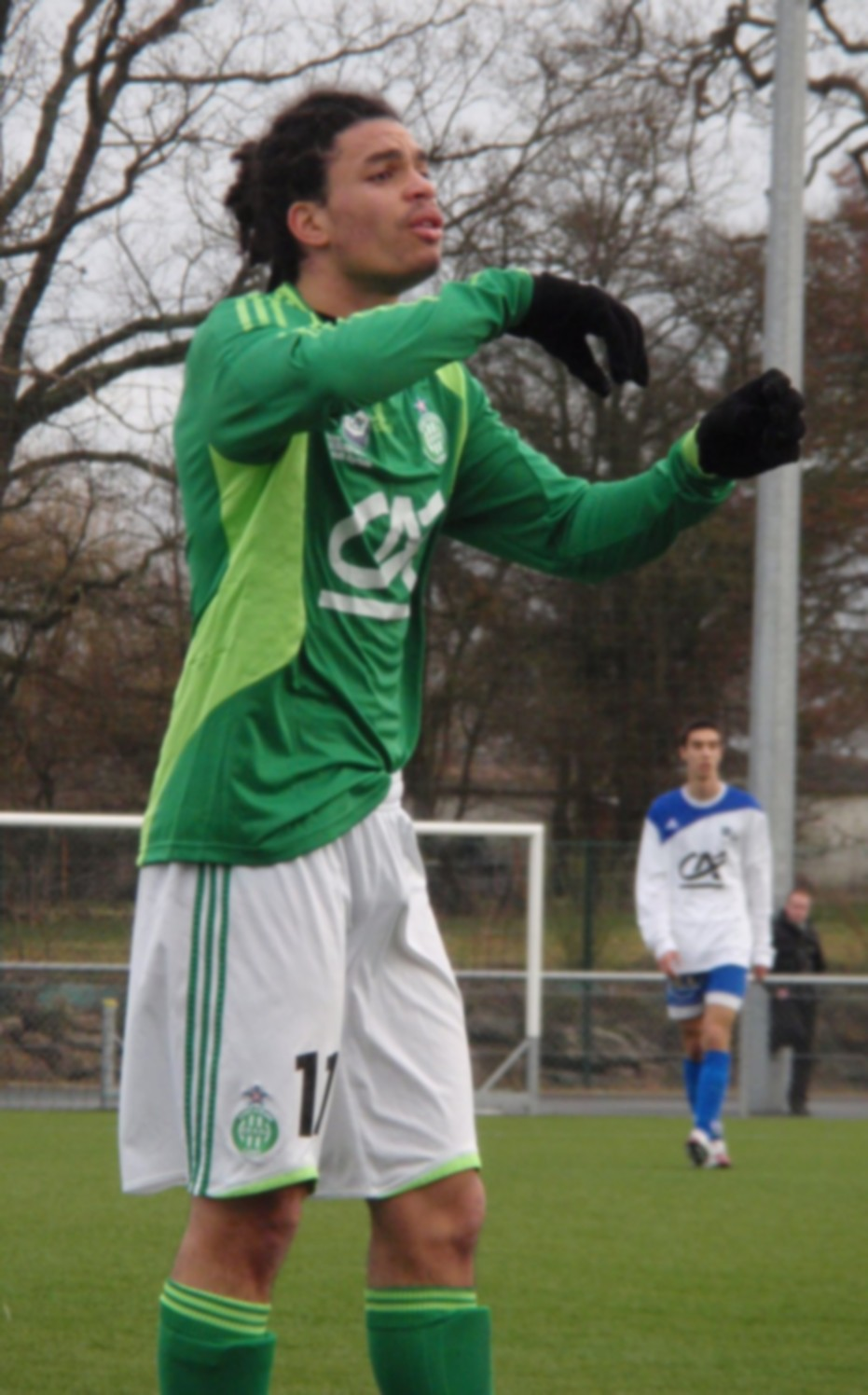
Rivière playing for Saint-Étienne

=== Saint-Étienne ===
During his early years at the club, former Saint-Étienne striker and fellow Martiniquais Frédéric Piquionne served as a mentor. Rivière made his debut in the reserves at the age of 16. During the summer of 2008, he signed his first professional contract agreeing to a three-year deal, which kept him with the Rhône-Alpes-based outfit until 2011.

For the duration of 2008, Rivière did not see any playing time with the senior team; he featured only in the reserves. He made his professional debut on 3 January 2009 in a Coupe de France match against Bordeaux. He started the match and played the full 90 minutes with Saint-Étienne picking up a 1–0 victory courtesy of a goal from Bafétimbi Gomis in the 74th minute. He made his league debut on 31 January in a match against rivals Lyon, coming on as a substitute in the 72nd minute; the match ended in a 1–1 draw. Rivière scored his first career goal for Saint-Étienne on 13 May 2009 in the club's 4–2 victory over Le Havre.

Due to the departure of Gomis, injuries to strikers Ilan and Kevin Mirallas, and the late arrival of the Argentine Gonzalo Bergessio, Rivière started the 2009–10 season as the club's first choice striker. On 15 August, Rivière netted his first goal of the season in the club's 3–1 loss to Toulouse. Following the inclusion of Bergessio into the team, Rivière shifted to the winger role. On 9 January 2010, he scored the opening goal in Saint-Étienne's 4–1 cup victory over Lorient. The following week, he scored the game-winning goal in a 2–1 victory over Grenoble. In February and March, Rivière performed valiantly, scoring five goals in seven matches and also assisting on a goal. Saint-Étienne only lost one of the seven matches played during the span, which lifted the club out of the relegation zone. Rivière scored opening goals in matches against Lyon and Lille, both of which ended in a draw, and scored the game-winning goal against Montpellier. On 5 May, Rivière netted another game-winning goal, this time against Boulogne. The 1–0 result assured Saint-Étienne another campaign in Ligue 1 and also relegated Boulogne.

On 22 July 2010, Rivière signed a three-year contract extension with Saint-Étienne until June 2014. Before signing the agreement, he drew interest from Ligue 1 club Toulouse and German club 1899 Hoffenheim.

=== Toulouse ===
On 12 July 2011, French club Toulouse confirmed that Rivière had joined the club on a four-year contract from Saint-Étienne. The transfer fee was priced at €6 million.

=== Monaco ===
On 30 January 2013, Rivière joined Monaco on a four-and-a-half-year contract for a fee reported to be around €4 million. He scored his first goal for Monaco on his debut in a 2–0 away win at Arles on 4 February 2013.

He scored in Monaco's first game back in Ligue 1 on 10 August 2013, coming on for James Rodríguez in the 72nd minute and scoring less than ten minutes later, helping the club to a 2–0 victory over Bordeaux. In Monaco's match against Montpellier on 18 August, he scored his first ever career hat-trick as the club eased to a 4–1 victory. He then went on to score against Marseille on 1 September, coming off the bench to net the winning goal.

=== Newcastle United ===
On 16 July 2014, Rivière joined Premier League side Newcastle United, signing a four-year contract for an undisclosed fee believed to be in the region of £6 million. He became manager Alan Pardew's fifth signing of the 2014 summer transfer window and upon joining the Tyneside club, Rivière spoke of his excitement of joining the club: "I'm very happy to be here at Newcastle. When the club spoke to me I said yes immediately. It was an easy decision because Newcastle is a big club with great fans and a good stadium."

He made his competitive debut on 17 August in Newcastle's opening match of the league season, a 2–0 defeat to Manchester City; he was substituted for fellow debutant Ayoze Pérez after 83 minutes. His first goals for the club came on 24 September when he scored two goals, including a penalty, to help his side defeat Crystal Palace 3–2 in the third round of the League Cup. Rivière did not score in the league until 16 May, when he was set up by goalkeeper Tim Krul to open the scoring away at Queens Park Rangers, with Newcastle eventually losing 1–2 to their already-relegated opponents at Loftus Road. This represented the player's solitary league goal for Newcastle.

=== Osasuna ===
On 31 August 2016, Rivière was loaned to La Liga side CA Osasuna for the 2016–17 season. He finished the season without scoring a goal and returned to Newcastle United at the end of the season.

=== Metz ===
On 25 August 2017, Rivière completed a move to French Ligue 1 club FC Metz. He left the club at the end of the 2018–19 season.

=== Cosenza ===
On 12 September 2019, Rivière signed a one-year contract with Serie B club Cosenza.

=== Crotone ===
On 11 September 2020, Rivière joined Serie A club Crotone for free. He signed a two-year contract. On 15 October 2021, Crotone announced that Rivière's contract was terminated by the club for the violation of said contract by the player, retroactively back from 13 August 2021.

== Career statistics ==
=== Club ===
Appearances and goals by club, season and competition
Club	Season	League			National cup		League cup		Continental		Total	
Club	Season	Division	Apps	Goals	Apps	Goals	Apps	Goals	Apps	Goals	Apps	Goals
Saint-Étienne	2008–09	Ligue 1	8	1	2	0	0	0	2 (Note: Appearances in the UEFA Cup)	0	12	1
Saint-Étienne	2009–10	Ligue 1	30	8	4	2	1	0	—		35	10
Saint-Étienne	2010–11	Ligue 1	35	8	1	0	2	0	—		38	8
Saint-Étienne	Total		73	17	7	2	3	0	2	0	85	19
Toulouse	2011–12	Ligue 1	26	5	0	0	0	0	—		26	5
Toulouse	2012–13	Ligue 1	18	4	2	1	1	0	—		21	5
Toulouse	Total		44	9	2	1	1	0	0	0	47	10
Monaco	2012–13	Ligue 2	14	4	0	0	0	0	—		14	4
Monaco	2013–14	Ligue 1	30	10	5	3	1	0	—		36	13
Monaco	Total		44	14	5	3	1	0	0	0	50	17
Newcastle United	2014–15	Premier League	23	1	1	0	4	2	—		28	3
Newcastle United	2015–16	Premier League	3	0	0	0	0	0	—		3	0
Newcastle United	Total		26	1	1	0	4	2	0	0	31	3
Osasuna (loan)	2016–17	La Liga	15	0	2	0	—		—		17	0
Metz	2017–18	Ligue 1	28	5	2	1	1	0	—		31	6
Metz	2018–19	Ligue 2	15	2	0	0	1	1	—		16	3
Metz	Total		43	7	2	1	2	1	0	0	47	9
Cosenza	2019–20	Serie B	31	13	0	0	—		—		31	13
Crotone	2020–21	Serie A	21	1	0	0	—		—		21	1
Career total			282	60	19	7	11	3	2	0	329	72

=== International ===
Scores and results list Martinique's goal tally first.

No.	Date	Venue	Opponent	Score	Result	Competition
1.	14 November 2019	Stade Pierre-Aliker, Fort-de-France, Martinique	Honduras	1–0	1–1	2019–20 CONCACAF Nations League A
2.	12 July 2021	Children's Mercy Park, Kansas City, United States	Canada	1–0	1–4	2021 CONCACAF Gold Cup
3.	15 July 2021	Children's Mercy Park, Kansas City, United States	United States	1–4	1–6	2021 CONCACAF Gold Cup

Rivière's goal against the United States in the 2021 CONCACAF Gold Cup, on a penalty kick, was the only time the USA conceded a goal in the entire tournament.

== Honours ==
Monaco

- Ligue 2: 2012–13

Metz

- Ligue 2: 2018–19
