= Fabinho (footballer, born 1993) =

Brazilian footballer

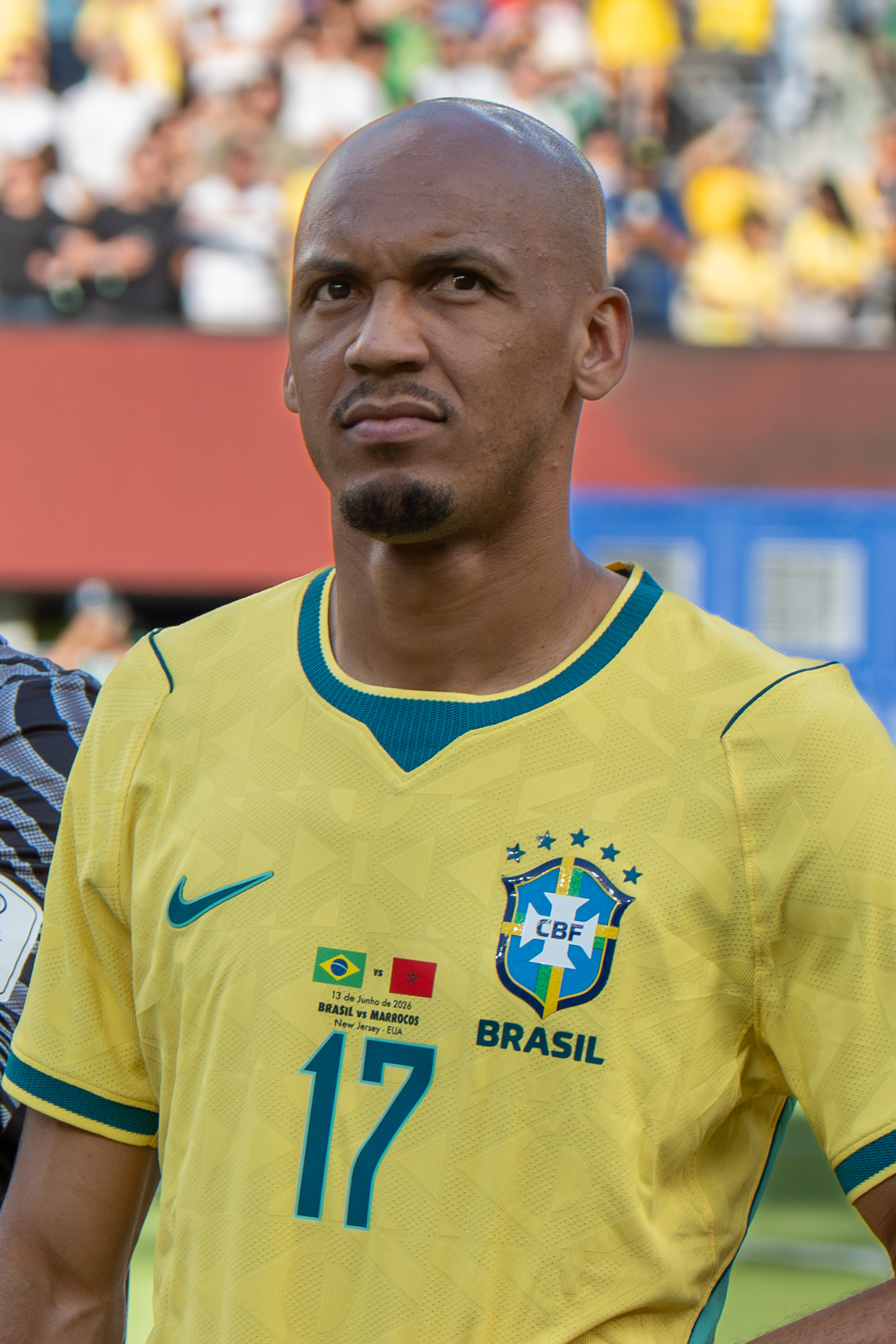
- Fabinho with Brazil in 2026

Personal information
- Full name: Fábio Henrique Tavares
- Date of birth: 23 October 1993 (age 33)
- Place of birth: Campinas, Brazil
- Height: 1.88 m (6 ft 2 in)
- Positions: Defensive midfielder; centre-back

Team information
- Current team: Trabzonspor
- Number: 6

Youth career
- –2012: Fluminense

Senior career*
Years	Team	Apps	(Gls)
2012	Fluminense	0	(0)
2012–2015	Rio Ave	0	(0)
2012–2013	→ Real Madrid Castilla (loan)	30	(2)
2013	→ Real Madrid (loan)	1	(0)
2013–2015	→ Monaco (loan)	62	(1)
2015–2018	Monaco	105	(22)
2018–2023	Liverpool	151	(8)
2023–2026	Al-Ittihad	81	(4)
2026–	Trabzonspor	9	(0)

International career^{‡}
2015–2016	Brazil U23	3	(0)
2015–2026	Brazil	36	(0)
Medal record
Men's football
Representing Brazil
Copa América
Runner-up	2021 Brazil
- * Club domestic league appearances and goals as of 12:30, 8 November 2026 (UTC) ‡ National team caps and goals as of 22 November 2026

Fábio Henrique Tavares (born 23 October 1993), known as Fabinho (Brazilian Portuguese: [faˈbĩɲu]), is a Brazilian professional footballer who plays as a midfielder for Süper Lig club Trabzonspor and the Brazil national team. A versatile player, he can also be deployed as a centre-back. Praised for his tackling, vision, and reading of the game, he is considered one of the best defensive midfielders of his generation.

Fabinho began his career at Paulínia FC and subsequently transferred to Fluminense and Rio Ave in 2012. He spent his entire time in Portugal out on loan, first at Real Madrid Castilla, and made one substitute appearance for the first team. He spent five years at Monaco, playing 233 total games and scoring 31 goals, and he won Ligue 1 in the 2016–17 season. He was recognised as a major player at the Monegasque club. Fabinho then transferred to Liverpool for a reported transfer fee of £39 million. In his debut season at Liverpool he won the UEFA Champions League. Victories in the UEFA Super Cup and in the FIFA Club World Cup preceded Fabinho playing a significant role in Liverpool winning the 2019–20 Premier League. He also won the FA Cup and EFL Cup with Liverpool in the 2021–22 season and won the FA Community Shield the following year. Fabinho has received much credit for his role in Liverpool's resurgence over the years. In 2023, Fabinho officially joined Saudi Pro League club Al-Ittihad, where he won the Saudi Pro League and King's Cup two years later.

Fabinho made his international debut for Brazil in 2015, and was part of their squads at the Copa América in 2015, 2016, and 2021, finishing as a runner-up in the latter edition. Fabinho was also selected as part of Brazil's squad for the FIFA World Cup in 2022 and 2026.

== Early life ==
Fabinho was born in Campinas, São Paulo, to Rosangela and João Roberto Tavares.

== Club career ==
=== Early career ===
Fabinho began his career at Fluminense. He was called into a first team matchday squad for the only time on 20 May 2012, as he was an unused substitute in a 1–0 win over Corinthians in that season's Série A. On 8 June 2012, Fabinho joined Portuguese Primeira Liga club Rio Ave on a six-year contract. Upon arriving in Vila do Conde, Fabinho was greeted by his new manager, Nuno Espírito Santo. Fabinho later stated that he had been informed of what to expect in Portugal by fellow footballer Deco, who had been with him at Fluminense.

After one month at Rio Ave, Fabinho joined Real Madrid Castilla on a season-long loan on 19 July 2012 and was welcomed in his hotel room in Madrid by José Mourinho. He made his professional debut on 17 August, as the Spanish Segunda División season began, playing 90 minutes in the 2–1 defeat at Villarreal. On 28 April 2013, he scored his first goal, heading an added-time equaliser for a 3–3 draw at CD Numancia. He made his debut for Real Madrid on 8 May 2013, playing 14 minutes in place of Fábio Coentrão and assisting the sixth goal by Ángel Di María in the 6–2 La Liga victory over Málaga at the Santiago Bernabéu Stadium. Fabinho was later praised by Jason Pettigrove of Bleacher Report as "assured and polished when called upon".

=== Monaco ===
==== 2013–2015: Adaptation to Monaco ====
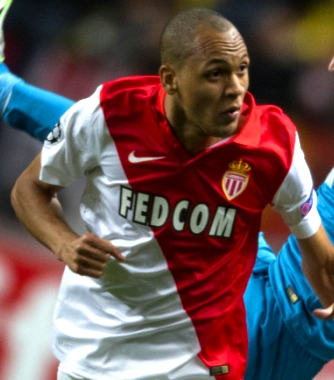
Fabinho playing for Monaco in 2014.

On 19 July 2013, Fabinho joined Monaco from Rio Ave on a season-long loan deal. Fabinho chose to move to Monaco as he was confident of receiving regular playing time there and as he was sure of Monaco's status as a prominent club. His decision was made in this way despite the fact that the coaches at Real Madrid Castilla had notified him that he would have a good chance of moving up to the first team. Fabinho took the squad number 2 to wear on his shirt. He made his debut on 10 August at the Stade Chaban-Delmas in Monaco's opening Ligue 1 match of the 2013–14 season, playing the entire match against Bordeaux, with Monaco winning 2–0. He scored his first goal for Monaco in the 58th minute in their 6–0 home win over Lens in the quarter-finals of the 2013–14 Coupe de France on 26 March 2014.

After completing his one-year loan at Monaco, he rejoined the club on loan for another year on 2 July 2014. On 9 December 2014, he scored the last goal in the Group C Matchday 6 2–0 home win over Zenit St Petersburg (his first UEFA Champions League or UEFA Europa League goal), to enable Monaco to qualify for 2014–15 UEFA Champions League knockout phase as group winners.

==== 2015–2018: Ligue 1 victory ====
"His versatility, his youth and his attitude mark him out as a player with a big future. It's also a source of pride to see him make it into the Brazilian squad."

— The former Monaco vice-president Vadim Vasilyev on Fabinho upon the announcement of his permanent transfer.

On 19 May 2015, after two seasons on loan at Monaco, Monaco and Rio Ave agreed on the permanent transfer of Fabinho; he signed a contract with Monaco for the next four seasons and would be tied to the club until 30 June 2019. On 20 March 2016, Fabinho won a penalty when fouled by compatriot David Luiz, and converted it for a 2–0 win that was Paris Saint-Germain's first home defeat since May 2014.

On 21 February 2017, Fabinho provided one assist each to Radamel Falcao and Kylian Mbappé in a 5–3 away defeat against Manchester City in the 2016–17 UEFA Champions League round of 16 first-leg match. On 15 March, Fabinho made the score 2–0 for Monaco in the 29th minute by driving home Benjamin Mendy's low cross to help Monaco beat Manchester City 3–1 (aggregate score 6–6) in the second-leg match at the Stade Louis II and advance to the quarter-finals on the away goals rule. After Monaco achieved victory in Ligue 1 in 2016–2017, several noted clubs, such as Manchester United, made attempts to sign Fabinho. Fabinho and several other Monaco players dyed their hair in the red-and-white colours of the club as a celebration for the title they had won.

=== Liverpool ===
==== 2018–19 season: UEFA Champions League victory ====
On 28 May 2018, Premier League club Liverpool announced that Fabinho, aged 24, would sign for the club on a long-term contract for a reported initial fee of £39 million, effective 1 July. It was reported that a further £4m could be added to the fee in the form of performance-related bonus payments. The announcement was made days after Liverpool's loss to Real Madrid in the 2018 UEFA Champions League final. The transfer made Fabinho the 9th most expensive Brazilian footballer in history. With Liverpool midfielder Emre Can expected to depart from Liverpool for Juventus, it was suggested by analysts that Fabinho was to be his replacement. Fabinho took the squad number 3 to wear on his shirt. Upon announcing his transfer, Fabinho described himself as "really excited" to be joining "a giant of a team". Fabinho later commented that when he had arrived at the club he had been able to "sense that Liverpool were at the start of something really special", adding that Liverpool "had waited for this moment and [that] now was the time for harvest". His debut for the club came as an injury-time substitute for Sadio Mané in a Champions League group match against Paris Saint-Germain on 18 September, a 3–2 win at Anfield. He made his league debut in a 1–0 win at Huddersfield Town on 20 October, coming on for the last 21 minutes in place of Adam Lallana. A week later he was granted a first league start in a 4–1 home victory against Cardiff City in central midfield alongside Georginio Wijnaldum, and received praise from Sky Sports. On 16 December, Fabinho provided his first assist for Liverpool, a dinked ball over the top of the opposition defence from which Sadio Mané scored, as Liverpool defeated Manchester United at home with a score of 3–1. On 26 December, Fabinho scored his first goal for Liverpool with a late header in a 4–0 win against Newcastle United.

On 7 January 2019, Fabinho played at centre-back against Wolverhampton Wanderers in the FA Cup third round. On 12 January 2019, Fabinho again played in a centre-back position in a 0–1 victory against Brighton & Hove Albion and was highly praised for his role in the win by Garth Crooks. On Fabinho's execution of the centre-back position in the latter match, Ian Wright noted that he had shown his "natural defensive instincts". Following such performances, manager Jurgen Klopp praised him and stated that he was a "new centre-back option". On 7 May 2019, Fabinho was a standout performer as Liverpool overturned a three-goal deficit and beat Barcelona 4–0 in the second leg of the 2018–19 UEFA Champions League semi-finals to advance to the final. In total, Fabinho won a total of 23 tackles, recoveries, interceptions and one-on-one challenges during the match. Former Liverpool player Jamie Carragher later noted that Fabinho was "particularly prominent" in patrolling the central zone of the pitch in the game, in addition lauding him for an "exquisite" tackle on Messi. Fabinho later described the game as the "biggest match" of his life and described the recitation of the 'You'll Never Walk Alone' anthem by the Anfield crowd as the "most defining moment" of his career. On 1 June, Fabinho started in the 2019 UEFA Champions League final against Tottenham Hotspur, playing the full 90 minutes as the club secured their sixth win in the competition and as Fabinho earned his first trophy with the club.

==== 2019–20 season: Super Cup and Premier League victory ====
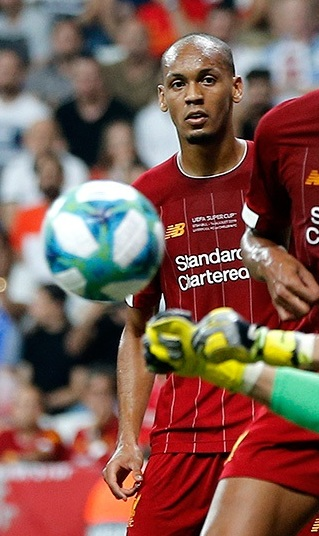
Fabinho playing for Liverpool in the 2019 UEFA Super Cup.

Fabinho started for Liverpool as the side finished as the runners-up to the 2019 FA Community Shield after a penalty shoot-out. On 14 August 2019, Fabinho played the full 90 minutes in the 2019 UEFA Super Cup against Chelsea, scoring Liverpool's second penalty in the shootout after regular time ended 2–2, in an eventual 5–4 win on penalties. On 27 October, he earned praise from the fans for his performance in a 2–1 win against Tottenham. Fabinho's first goal of the season came against Manchester City on 10 November, scoring an early long-ranged goal in an eventual 3–1 win. Scoring this goal after 5 minutes and 26 seconds of the match's start, Fabinho became the fastest Premier League player to score against Manchester City since December 2016 when Theo Walcott of Arsenal scored after 4 minutes 6 seconds.

On 27 November 2019, during a crucial Champions League match against Napoli, he suffered an early ankle injury after falling awkwardly during a challenge and was substituted after 18 minutes. Two days later, the club announced that the injury would keep Fabinho out of action until the start of 2020. On 21 December 2019, Fabinho won the 2019 FIFA Club World Cup after Liverpool beat Flamengo in the final. On 24 June 2020, Fabinho scored a long-range goal from more than thirty yards in a victory against Crystal Palace and was described by journalist Phil McNulty as a "complete operator" who "showed all sides of his game in what turned into a stroll". The same game, he provided a brilliant pass for Mohamed Salah to score and effectively settle the contest. Thus, Fabinho celebrated his 41st victory in what was his 50th Premier League appearance; only Didier Drogba, Arjen Robben, Ederson and Aymeric Laporte have won more of their opening 50 games in the competition. On 25 June 2020, Liverpool won the Premier League after Manchester City were defeated by Chelsea with a score of 2–1. Fabinho played a major part in Liverpool's 2019–20 Premier League title win that season.

==== 2020–21 season: 100th appearance ====
Fabinho started for Liverpool as the side finished as the runners-up to the 2020 FA Community Shield after a penalty shoot-out in which he scored. During the 2020–21 season, Fabinho had to play as a centre-back due to the club's injury problems, one of which being the absence of key defender Virgil van Dijk for some time. On 20 September 2020, Fabinho was widely praised by analysts for a performance in a 0–2 victory against Chelsea in which he made more passes (90) and gained possession more times (12) than any other player. In a Champions League group stage match on 21 October 2020, Fabinho executed an overhead kick clearance off the goal-line to preserve a clean sheet for Liverpool as his side beat Ajax 1–0. Fabinho was voted as man of the match by users of BBC Sport, with manager Jürgen Klopp later stating that Fabinho "actually" enjoyed "[playing] the position". After again playing as a centre-back in a Premier League game against Wolverhampton Wanderers on 8 December 2020, Fabinho was praised by Alan Shearer, who called his defending "superb".

In December 2020, he made his 100th appearance for Liverpool. On 30 December 2020, Fabinho was named in football analyst Garth Crooks' Premier League team of the year along with teammates Sadio Mané, Jordan Henderson, Alisson Becker, Andrew Robertson and Trent Alexander-Arnold. It was calculated that Fabinho topped all Liverpool players for tackles (64) and interceptions (38) in Premier League games in 2020. On 3 August 2021, Fabinho signed a long-term contract with Liverpool until 2026. In this contract, Fabinho was rewarded with a large pay rise owing to gratitude from the Liverpool management for his impressive performances and contributions to Liverpool's recent success in all competitions.

==== 2021–22 season: Further domestic and European success ====
"Whenever Liverpool need to dig out a result Fabinho always seems to be the man on hand to provide the grit and determination required."

— Garth Crooks on Fabinho's performances in the 2021–22 season.

On 12 September 2021, Fabinho scored his first goal of the season, tapping home from close range against Leeds United, the second in an eventual 3–0 win. On 9 January 2022, Fabinho scored his first goals in the FA Cup, scoring the second and fourth in a 4–1 third-round victory over Shrewsbury Town. On 13 February 2022, Fabinho scored again against Burnley from a corner to win the game. The goal was his fifth goal in his past seven games in all competitions. Liverpool won the FA Cup on 15 May 2022 by beating Chelsea in the final, which ended in a 0–0 draw after extra time with Liverpool winning 5–6 in the penalty shoot-out, although Fabinho was not in the matchday squad for the final owing to a hamstring injury. In addition, Fabinho also won the EFL Cup in the 2021–22 season, scoring a Panenka-style penalty in the shoot-out over Chelsea in the final on 27 February 2022. During the match, Fabinho won possession back nine times, the joint most alongside Virgil Van Dijk.

On 3 May 2022, in the 2021–22 UEFA Champions League semi-finals, Fabinho scored a goal against Villarreal though the legs of goalkeeper Gerónimo Rulli to aid Liverpool in progressing to the final. Fabinho later earned a runners-up medal in the Champions League, losing the final to Real Madrid with a scoreline of 0–1 on 28 May 2022, and was selected as part of the Team of the Season. Furthermore, Fabinho was also praised for his role in Liverpool's second-place finish in the Premier League, just a solitary point behind champions Manchester City. The 2021–22 season was also Fabinho's most prolific season at Liverpool in terms of goals scored. For his all-round performances in the season, Fabinho was awarded 14th place in the 2022 Ballon d'Or, joint with Rafael Leão of AC Milan. Liverpool narrowly missed out on the chance to achieve a historic quadruple, coming second in the Premier League and the 2021–22 UEFA Champions League but winning both the EFL Cup and the FA Cup.

==== 2022–23 season: FA Community Shield victory ====
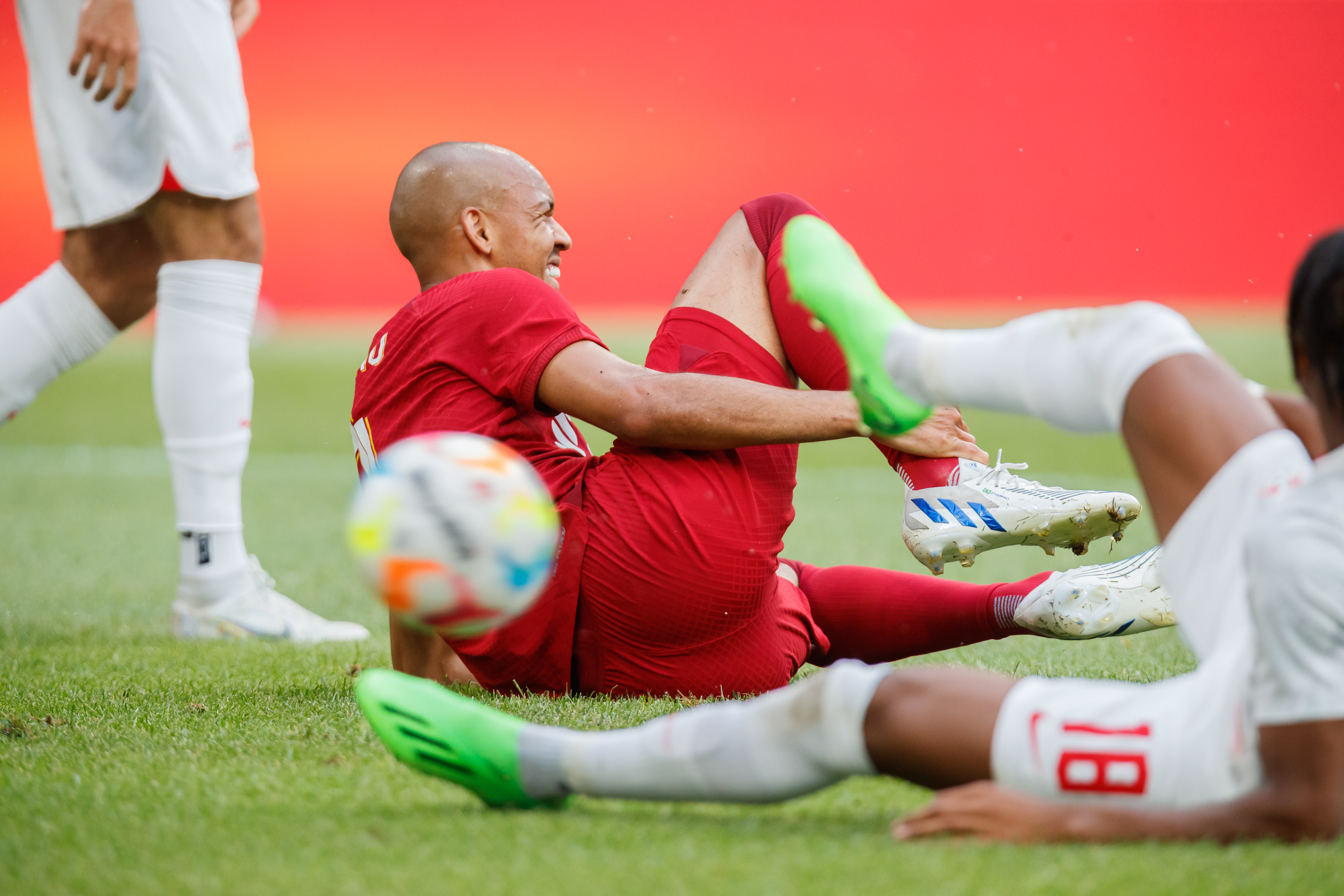
Fabinho playing for Liverpool in a pre-season game before the 2022–23 season.

On 30 July 2022, Fabinho started for Liverpool in the club's 3–1 win over Manchester City in the FA Community Shield at the King Power Stadium. Fabinho was criticised by pundits for his performances through much of the 2022–23 season before recording a string of improved performances in its final months as Liverpool were unbeaten in their last nine games. Fabinho was praised for authoritative and calm performances against Fulham on 3 May 2023 and against Brentford, when he also created the goal opportunity which led to the sole goal of the match, on 6 May 2023.

"He is the one shining example of a player who has got everything. He's the right age, he's the right quality, he's always fit and healthy."

— Michael Owen on Fabinho's qualities as a defensive midfielder in the 2022–23 season.

On 28 May, Fabinho assisted his teammate Roberto Firmino's last goal for Liverpool in a high-scoring draw against Southampton, Liverpool's last game of the season. At the end of the 2022–23 season, Liverpool narrowly missed out on UEFA Champions League qualification. In the preseason of the upcoming 2023–24 season, Fabinho was targeted by Nuno Espírito Santo of Al-Ittihad with a reported bid of £40 million. On 15 July, it was reported that he had departed from Liverpool's squad, who were travelling to a training camp in Germany. Amid reports that Bayern Munich had displayed interest in Fabinho, on 23 July 2023 it was reported that his transfer to Al-Ittihad had a chance of collapse since his French Bulldogs were prohibited from entering Saudi Arabia. Such speculation was dismissed as false by Fabinho's team and by various journalistic outlets.

=== Al-Ittihad ===
On 31 July 2023, Fabinho officially joined Al-Ittihad on a three-year deal lasting until 2026. The deal was reportedly worth £40 million. Announcements were made by all parties involved. The fee paid by Al-Ittihad for the transfer of Fabinho was the fifth-largest sum ever paid to Liverpool for the departure of a player. Owing to the move, Fabinho joined his former manager Nuno Espírito Santo in Saudi Arabia. The transfer of Fabinho was one of a series of high-profile transfers to Al-Ittihad, with other notable players joining the Jeddah-based club including Karim Benzema, N'Golo Kante and Jota. Commenting on Fabinho's departure from Liverpool, Jürgen Klopp stated that he would "definitely" miss him. In the midst of the 2023–24 season, with the lack of a long-term option to succeed him in defensive midfield, it was suggested by journalist David Brindle that Fabinho's departure from Liverpool could be a "big regret" for the club.

On 14 August 2023, Fabinho made his first appearance for his new club in a commanding 3–0 victory against Al-Raed and was widely praised for his performance. He was later given a large Rolex watch by a Saudi journalist as a gift of thanks for his performance. On 5 August 2026, he left the club following the expiration of his contract.

=== Trabzonspor ===
On 24 August 2026, Fabinho signed for Süper Lig side Trabzonspor, on a two year deal.

== International career ==
Included in coach Dunga's 23-man squad for the 2015 Copa América in Chile, Fabinho made his debut in a warm-up match against Mexico on 7 June of that year, as a half-time substitute for Danilo in a 2–0 victory at Allianz Parque in São Paulo. With Dani Alves playing the entire tournament at right-back, Fabinho did not play at the Copa América, in which Brazil reached the quarter-finals. Fabinho was selected for Brazil's Copa América Centenario squad, although he did not play in any of Brazil's three matches at the tournament.

In June 2021, he was included in Brazil's squad for the 2021 Copa América on home soil.

On 7 November 2022, Fabinho was named in the squad for the 2022 FIFA World Cup. He served mainly as a back-up to Casemiro but was praised for the performances he made during the tournament.

On 18 May 2026, Fabinho was selected for Brazil's squad for the 2026 FIFA World Cup.

== Player profile ==
=== Style of play ===
"It is so comforting watching him... when he is in the middle you feel safe."

— Michael Owen on Fabinho.

Fabinho was often regarded as one of the best defensive midfielders in the world, with Sky Sports pundit and former Manchester United player Gary Neville saying, "Fabinho... is the best." He is a robust, agile player who is valued for his ability to win back the ball in the midfield and recycle possession quickly. Fabinho can also provide long balls to wingers to advance play. His role as defensive midfielder sometimes requires him to drop further back to play as a third centre-back to cover for Liverpool's fullbacks Andrew Robertson and Trent Alexander-Arnold. Jürgen Klopp has commented that "Fab[inho] was for so long the insurance we [Liverpool] had more or less in midfield," and that he "always gave us [Liverpool] the freedom to play all the fancy stuff" despite being "involved in that from time to time as well".

"He saves our lives. He gives us opportunities to play the way we play, together with the two centre-halves, so we can really focus on offensive stuff. He's a massive player for us."

— Jürgen Klopp on Fabinho.

Fabinho's vision and reading of the game are considered outstanding and have led to him being nicknamed 'The Lighthouse' by former Liverpool assistant coach Pepijn Lijnders and his teammates. Such attributes have led sports journalist Jonathan Liew to call him a "midfielder whose superior reading of the game can occasionally offer the illusion of clairvoyance". Fabinho also has a pass completion rate which exceeds 90%. Moreover, Fabinho has earned himself the nickname "The Hoover" courtesy of former team-mate Joe Gomez, as he is adept in removing opposing teams' attacking threat on the field. Fabinho has also been called "the spine of the team [Liverpool]" by former team-mate Virgil van Dijk. Furthermore, Fabinho has drawn praise for powerful and well-placed long-range goals as well as for being a reliable and precise penalty-kick taker. Fabinho cites Lionel Messi as the toughest opponent he has ever faced.

=== Reception ===
Fabinho has drawn praise for his ability and achievements from eminent footballing figures such as Michael Owen, Gary Neville, and Ronaldinho, with the latter calling him a "champion with Liverpool and a very important player for them [as well]" and somebody for whom he had the "utmost respect". Former Arsenal forward Thierry Henry has also stated that Fabinho's presence "calms everybody down" on the pitch, referring to Fabinho's effect on his teammates. Former Liverpool player Jamie Carragher has voiced his belief that as a man who could "win the ball" as well as he could "use it", Fabinho's introduction in the Liverpool side had raised the squad's quality. Paul Salt of BBC Radio Merseyside has voiced his belief that Fabinho has been "a great servant" to Liverpool. He has been named in The Guardian's list of the best 100 male footballers on five occasions: 2017, 2019, 2020, 2021 and 2022.

== Personal life ==
Fabinho married Rebeca Tavares in 2015, having been together since 2013. Rebeca was a professional footballer and initially played at a high level as an attacker in Spain, later signing for AS Monaco FF in January 2018 before retiring the same year to support her husband upon his move to Merseyside. The couple revealed Rebeca was pregnant with their first child in July 2022. Their son Israel was born in January 2023. Fabinho has referred to his son as his "little Scouser". Fabinho's father João Roberto died in 2021.

Fabinho is often called 'Flaco', meaning 'skinny' in Spanish, by his teammates, as well as 'Fab'. The Brazilian took Fabinho as his name because when he was in the Fluminense Under 20s, the coach, Marcelo Veiga, referred to him in this way to distinguish him from Fábio Braga. He later decided to keep "Fabinho" on his shirt instead of his given names because his mother recommended he do so. Fabinho is known to spend time with compatriots and former Liverpool F.C teammates Alisson Becker and Roberto Firmino while still living in Liverpool, as well as fellow countrymen Ederson, Fred, and Fernandinho (the three of whom were formerly based in Manchester), and their families until his departure from England, as well as Firmino, Ederson, Fred and Fernandinho's, with Fabinho and Firmino moving to Jeddah, Saudi Arabia, Ederson and Fred moving to Istanbul, Turkey, and Fernandinho returning to Brazil. Fabinho is a devout Christian and is a highly popular figure in Liverpool.

== Career statistics ==
=== Club ===
As of match played 8 November 2026

Appearances and goals by club, season and competition
Club	Season	League			National cup (Note: Includes Coupe de France, FA Cup, King's Cup)		League cup (Note: Includes Coupe de la Ligue, EFL Cup)		Continental		Other		Total	
Club	Season	Division	Apps	Goals	Apps	Goals	Apps	Goals	Apps	Goals	Apps	Goals	Apps	Goals
Fluminense	2012	Série A	0	0	—		—		0	0	0	0	0	0
Real Madrid Castilla (loan)	2012–13	Segunda División	30	2	—		—		—		—		30	2
Real Madrid (loan)	2012–13	La Liga	1	0	0	0	—		0	0	0	0	1	0
Monaco (loan)	2013–14	Ligue 1	26	0	4	1	1	0	—		—		31	1
Monaco (loan)	2014–15	Ligue 1	36	1	4	0	3	0	10 (Note: Appearances in UEFA Champions League)	1	—		53	2
Monaco	2015–16	Ligue 1	34	6	3	2	1	0	9 (Note: Four appearances in UEFA Champions League, five appearances in UEFA Europa League)	0	—		47	8
Monaco	2016–17	Ligue 1	37	9	4	0	1	0	14	3	—		56	12
Monaco	2017–18	Ligue 1	34	7	2	1	4	0	5	0	1 (Note: Appearance in Trophée des Champions)	0	46	8
Monaco	Total		167	25	17	4	10	0	38	4	1	0	233	31
Liverpool	2018–19	Premier League	28	1	1	0	1	0	11	0	—		41	1
Liverpool	2019–20	Premier League	28	2	2	0	0	0	7	0	2 (Note: One appearance in FA Community Shield, one appearance in UEFA Super Cup)	0	39	2
Liverpool	2020–21	Premier League	30	0	2	0	1	0	8	0	1 (Note: Appearance in FA Community Shield)	0	42	0
Liverpool	2021–22	Premier League	29	5	3	2	3	0	13	1	—		48	8
Liverpool	2022–23	Premier League	36	0	3	0	1	0	8	0	1	0	49	0
Liverpool	Total		151	8	11	2	6	0	47	1	4	0	219	11
Al-Ittihad	2023–24	Saudi Pro League	19	1	2	0	—		7 (Note: Appearances in AFC Champions League)	0	2 (Note: Appearances in FIFA Club World Cup)	0	30	1
Al-Ittihad	2024–25	Saudi Pro League	32	2	5	1	—		—		—		37	3
Al-Ittihad	2025–26	Saudi Pro League	30	1	3	0	—		10	2	1 (Note: Appearance in Saudi Super Cup)	0	44	3
Al-Ittihad	Total		81	4	10	1	—		17	2	3	0	111	7
Trabzonspor	2026–27	Süper Lig	9	0	0	0	—		3 (Note: Appearances in UEFA Conference League)	0	0	0	12	0
Career total			439	37	38	7	16	0	105	7	8	0	606	51

=== International ===
As of match played 29 June 2026

Appearances and goals by national team and year
National team	Year	Apps	Goals
Brazil	2015	3	0
Brazil	2016	1	0
Brazil	2017	0	0
Brazil	2018	3	0
Brazil	2019	5	0
Brazil	2020	0	0
Brazil	2021	10	0
Brazil	2022	7	0
Brazil	2023	0	0
Brazil	2024	0	0
Brazil	2025	1	0
Brazil	2026	6	0
Total		36	0

== Honours ==
Monaco

- Ligue 1: 2016–17
- Coupe de la Ligue runner-up: 2016–17, 2017–18

Liverpool

- Premier League: 2019–20
- FA Cup: 2021–22
- EFL Cup: 2021–22
- FA Community Shield: 2022; runner-up: 2019, 2020
- UEFA Champions League: 2018–19; runner-up: 2021–22
- UEFA Super Cup: 2019
- FIFA Club World Cup: 2019

Al-Ittihad

- Saudi Pro League: 2024–25
- King's Cup: 2024–25

Brazil

- Copa América runner-up: 2021

Individual

- UEFA Champions League Team of the Season: 2021–22
