= Tafsir Chérif =

Guinean footballer

Personal information
- Date of birth: 19 June 1995 (age 31)
- Place of birth: Conakry, Guinea
- Height: 1.75 m (5 ft 9 in)
- Position: Forward

Team information
- Current team: Mâcon

Youth career
- 2012–2014: Monaco

Senior career*
Years	Team	Apps	(Gls)
2014–2017	Monaco II	24	(9)
2014–2015	→ Auxerre (loan)	5	(1)
2014–2015	→ Auxerre II (loan)	5	(0)
2015	→ Orléans (loan)	7	(0)
2015–2016	→ Varzim (loan)	21	(2)
2016	→ Rio Ave (loan)	1	(0)
2017	→ Cercle Brugge (loan)	1	(0)
2017–2018	Cholet	6	(0)
2018–2019	Varzim	22	(0)
2019–2020	Académica	3	(0)
2020	Al-Nojoom		
2021–2022	Quevilly-Rouen II	3	(2)
2022	Quevilly-Rouen	1	(0)
2023–2024	Monaco II		
2024–	Mâcon	6	(0)

International career^{‡}
2016	Guinea U20	4	(1)
- * Club domestic league appearances and goals as of 13 December 2024 ‡ National team caps and goals as of 25 May 2016

Tafsir Chérif (born 19 June 1995) is a Guinean professional footballer who plays as a forward for French Championnat National 3 club Mâcon.

Chérif represented the Guinea U20s at the 2016 Toulon Tournament.

== Career ==
On 31 August 2016, the last day of the 2016 summer transfer window, Chérif joined Rio Ave on loan from Monaco.

== Career statistics ==
=== Club ===
As of match played 1 January 2020

Appearances and goals by club, season and competition
Club	Season	League			National Cup		League Cup		Europe		Other		Total	
Club	Season	Division	Apps	Goals	Apps	Goals	Apps	Goals	Apps	Goals	Apps	Goals	Apps	Goals
Monaco II	2012–13	CFA	1	0	—		—		—		—		1	0
Monaco II	2013–14	CFA	23	9	—		—		—		—		23	9
Monaco II	2014–15	CFA	0	0	—		—		—		—		0	0
Monaco II	2015–16	CFA	2	0	—		—		—		—		2	0
Monaco II	Total		26	9	0	0	0	0	0	0	0	0	26	9
Auxerre II (loan)	2014–15	CFA2	5	0	—		—		—		—		5	0
Auxerre (loan)	2014–15	Ligue 2	5	1	0	0	1	1	—		—		6	2
Orléans (loan)	2014–15	Ligue 2	7	0	—		—		—		—		7	0
Varzim (loan)	2015–16	LigaPro	21	2	0	0	0	0	—		—		21	2
Rio Ave (loan)	2016–17	Primeira Liga	1	0	0	0	1	0	—		—		2	0
Cercle Brugge (loan)	2016–17	Belgian First Division B	0	0	0	0	—		—		1	0	1	0
Cholet	2017–18	National	8	0	0	0	—		—		—		8	0
Varzim	2018–19	LigaPro	22	0	2	0	0	0	—		—		24	0
Académica	2020–19	LigaPro	3	0	0	0	0	0	—		—		3	0
Career total			98	12	2	0	2	1	0	0	1	0	103	13
