= Fawzi Ouaamar =

Moroccan footballer

Personal information
- Date of birth: 12 March 1993 (age 33)
- Place of birth: Temsamane, Morocco
- Height: 1.78 m (5 ft 10 in)
- Position: Central midfielder

Team information
- Current team: Châtellerault
- Number: 10

Youth career
- 2008–2013: Monaco

Senior career*
Years	Team	Apps	(Gls)
2011–2016	Monaco B	62	(8)
2014–2015	→ Arles-Avignon (loan)	30	(3)
2016–2017	CR Al Hoceima	21	(0)
2017	Le Pontet	5	(0)
2018	Athlético Marseille	8	(1)
2018–2019	UMS Montélimar	34	(8)
2019–2020	Pau II	1	(0)
2020–2023	Jura Dolois	49	(9)
2023–	Châtellerault	35	(2)
- * Club domestic league appearances and goals as of 19 April 2025

Fawzi Ouaamar (Arabic: فوزي واعمر; born 12 March 1993) is a Moroccan professional footballer who plays as a midfielder for French Championnat National 3 club Châtellerault.

== Club career ==
A youth product of Monaco, Ouaamar was loaned in July 2014 to Arles-Avignon to gain more playing time. He made his full professional debut a few weeks later, in a 0–0 Ligue 2 draw against Ajaccio.

Released by Monaco, Ouammar signed a three-year deal with Moroccan side Chabab Rif Al Hoceima in August 2016.

After one season in Morocco he returned to France, signing for three months with Le Pontet. In January 2018 he signed a two-and-a-half-year deal with GS Consolat, but left after six months for personal reasons. He spent the 2018–19 season with sixth-tier amateur club UMS Montélimar, and in July 2019 signed a one-year deal with Pau, rejoining his former coach form Monaco and Arles-Avignon, Bruno Irles.
