= Corentin Tirard =

French footballer (born 1995)

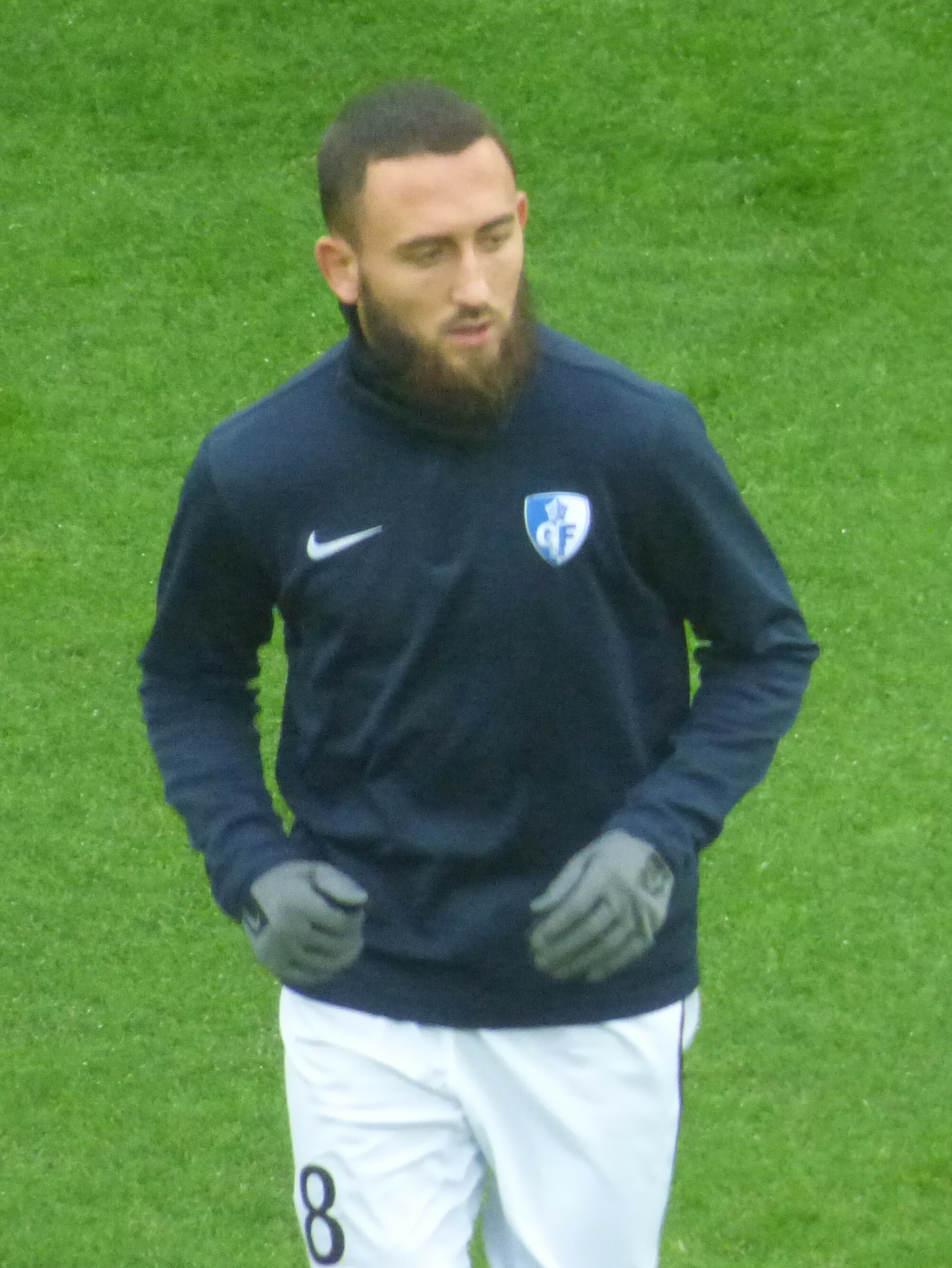
- Tirard with Grenoble in 2018

Personal information
- Full name: Corentin Tirard
- Date of birth: 18 October 1995 (age 31)
- Place of birth: Romans-sur-Isère, France
- Height: 1.75 m (5 ft 9 in)
- Position: Midfielder

Team information
- Current team: Lancy FC
- Number: 18

Youth career
- 2001–2003: St-Just de Claix
- 2003–2009: St-Marcellin
- 2009–2011: Côte St André
- 2011–2012: Valence
- 2012–2014: Monaco

Senior career*
Years	Team	Apps	(Gls)
2014–2017	Monaco B	78	(14)
2017–2019	Grenoble	8	(0)
2019	→ Sparta (loan)	7	(1)
2019–2024	Thonon Evian	63	(14)
2024–	Lancy FC	40	(4)

International career
2015	France U20	2	(0)
- * Club domestic league appearances and goals as of 04:51, 9 June 2022 (UTC)

Corentin Tirard (born 18 October 1995) is a French professional footballer who plays as a midfielder for Swiss 1. Liga Classic club Lancy FC.

== Club career ==
A youth product of Monaco, Tirard joined Grenoble in Championnat National on 20 July 2017. Tirard made his professional debut with Grenoble in a 2–1 Ligue 2 win over Nancy on 19 October 2018. In January 2019, he was loaned six month to Sparta.

On 28 August 2019, Tirard joined Thonon Evian.

== Honours ==
Thonon Evian

- Championnat National 3: 2021–22
- Régional 1 Auvergne-Rhône-Alpes: 2019–20
