= Yarouba Cissako =

French footballer (born 1995)

Personal information
- Date of birth: 8 January 1995 (age 31)
- Place of birth: Pontoise, France
- Height: 1.75 m (5 ft 9 in)
- Position: Right-back

Youth career
- 2004–2009: Cergy Pontoise (Note: In 2005, Olympique de Cergy-Pontoise merged with US Cergy Clos to form Cergy Pontoise FC.)
- 2005–2009: Saint-Ouen l'Aumône
- 2010–2014: Monaco

Senior career*
Years	Team	Apps	(Gls)
2014–2016	Monaco	0	(0)
2014–2015	→ Zulte Waregem (loan)	25	(1)
2017	Sprimont-Comblain	10	(0)
2017–2018	Cholet	10	(0)

International career
2011	France U16	7	(0)
2011–2012	France U17	11	(0)
2013	France U19	5	(0)
- * Club domestic league appearances and goals as of 21:34, 2 January 2022 (UTC)

Yarouba Cissako (born 8 January 1995) is a French professional footballer who plays as a right-back.

== Club career ==
Cissako is a product of AS Monaco's academy. During the 2014–15 season, he played on loan for Belgian side Zulte Waregem in the Belgian Pro League. He made his first team debut on 17 July 2014 in the UEFA Europa League qualifying round against Zawisza Bydgoszcz. He made 25 league appearances and scored one goal.

== International career ==
Cissako was born in France and holds French nationality. He is of Malian descent. He is a youth international for France.
