= Geography of France =

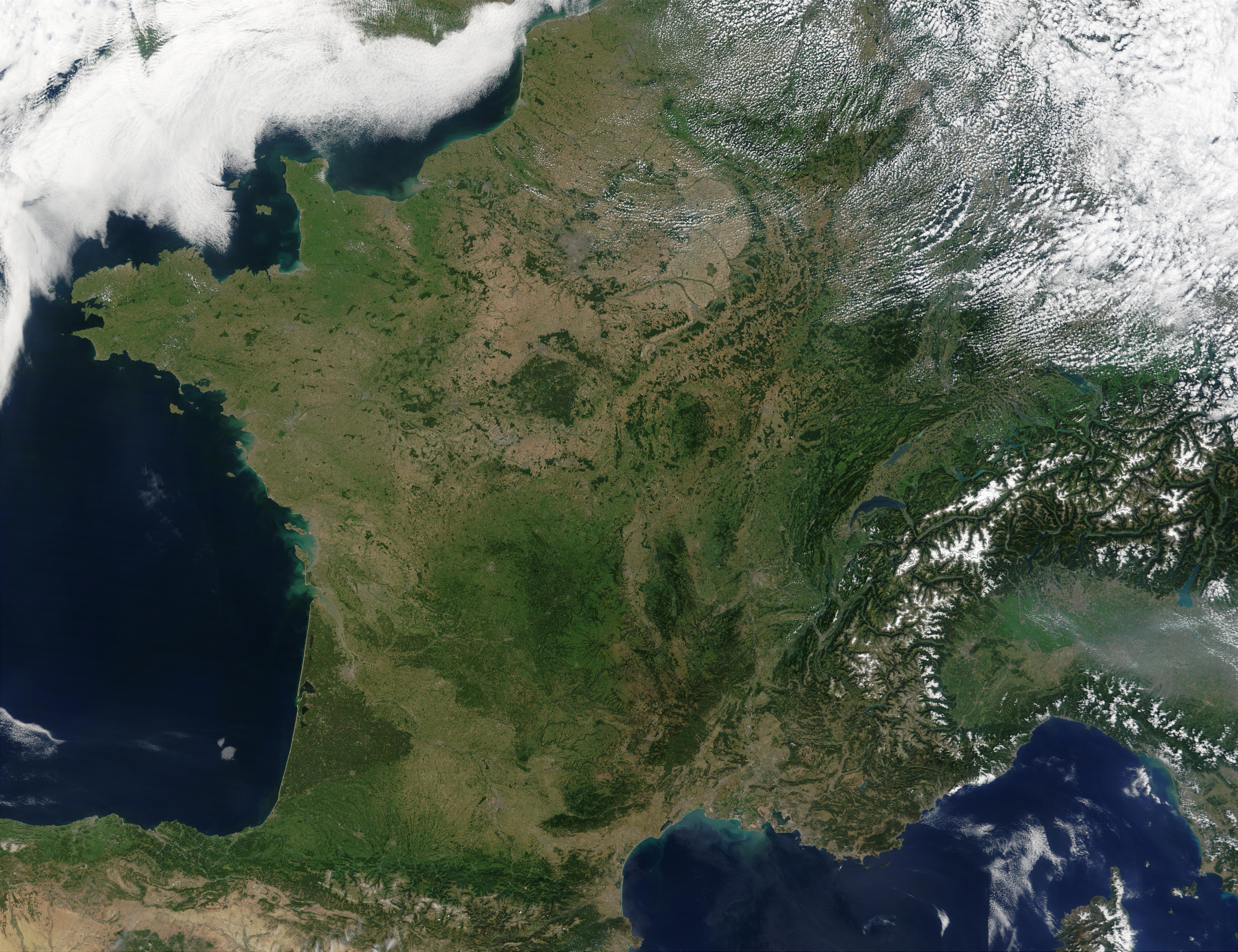
- Continent: Europe
- Region: Western Europe
- Coordinates: 52°51′N 2°21′E
- Area: Ranked 42nd
  - Total: 643,801 km^{2} (248,573 sq mi)
  - Land: 99.48%
  - Water: 0.52%
- Coastline: 5,500 km (3,400 mi)
- Borders: 4,176 km (2,595 mi)
- Highest point: Mont Blanc 4,808 m (15,774 ft)
- Lowest point: Étang de Lavalduc −10 m (−33 ft)
- Longest river: Loire 1,012 km (629 mi)
- Largest lake: Lac du Bourget 44.5 km^{2} (17.2 mi^{2})
- Climate: Oceanic climate, Mediterranean climate (south), mountain climate (Alps and Pyrenees)
- Terrain: Plains and hills (north and west), mountainous (south)
- Natural resources: Coal, iron ore, bauxite, zinc, uranium, antimony, arsenic, potash, feldspar, fluorspar, gypsum, timber, fish, gold
- Natural hazards: Flooding, avalanches, midwinter windstorms, drought, forest fires (south)
- Environmental issues: Water pollution, air pollution, agricultural runoff, acid rain
- Exclusive economic zone: In Europe: 334,604 km^{2} (129,191 mi^{2}); All overseas territories: 11,691,000 km^{2} (4,514,000 mi^{2})

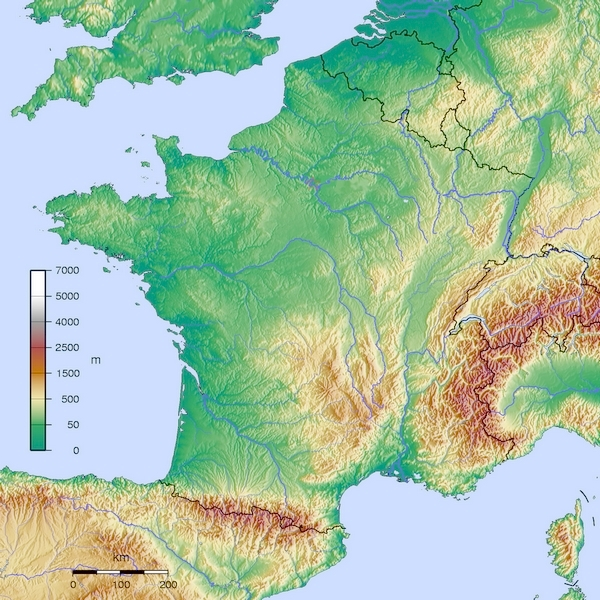
A topographic map of the Republic, excluding all the overseas departments and territories

Simplified physical map

The geography of France consists of a terrain that is mostly flat plains or gently rolling hills in the north and the west and mountainous in the south (including the Massif Central and the Pyrenees) and the east (the country's highest points being in the Alps). Metropolitan France has a total size of 551,695 km^{2} (213,011 mi^{2}) (Europe only). It is the third-largest country in Europe by area (after Russia and Ukraine) and the largest in Western Europe.

== Physical geography of Metropolitan France ==
Köppen climate classification map of Metropolitan France

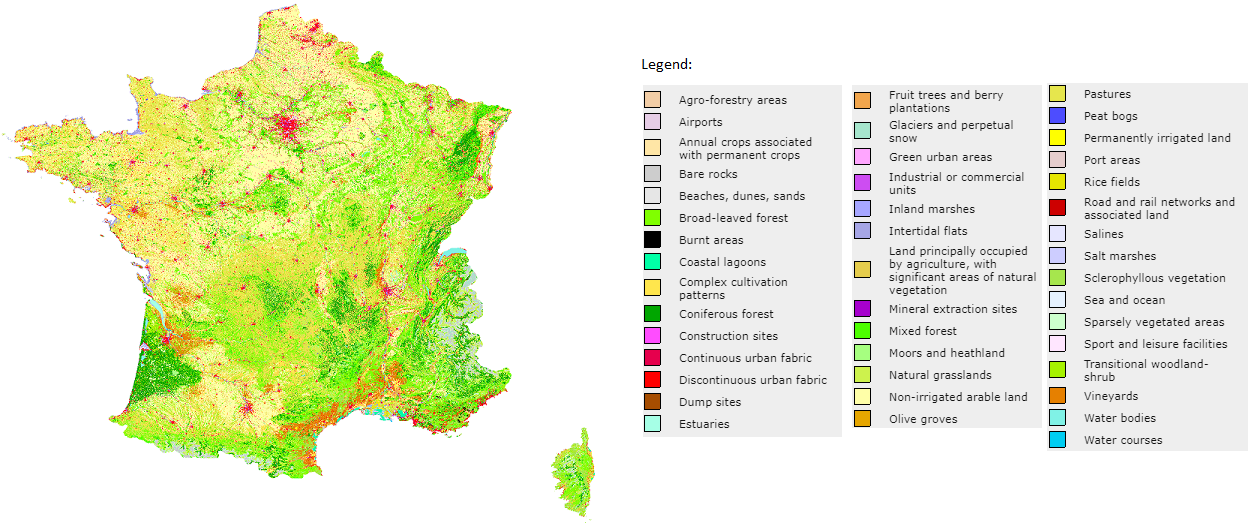
Land use in Metropolitan France, with urban areas shown in red, 2006.

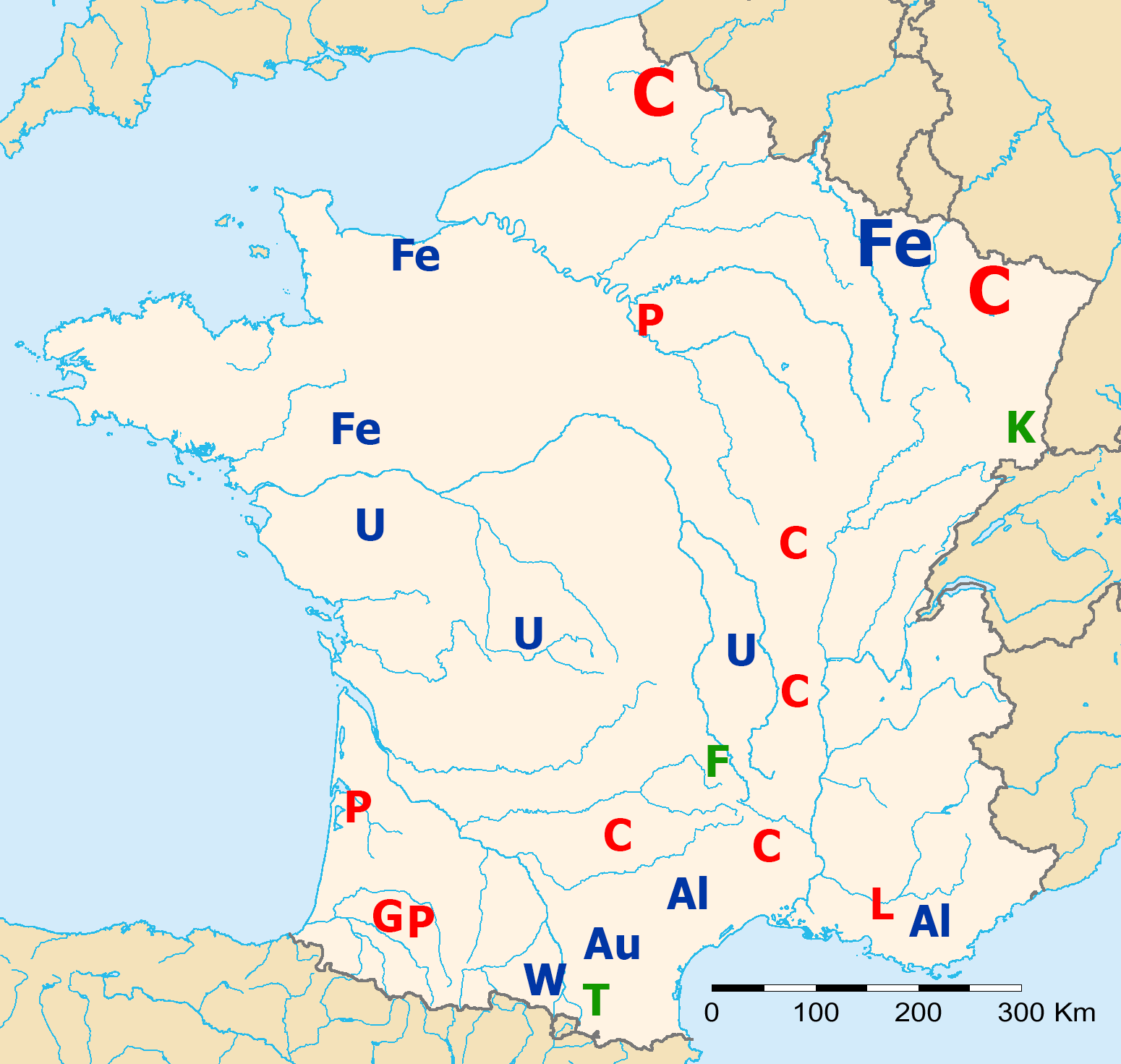
Natural resources of France. Metals are in blue (Al — aluminium ore, Fe — iron ore, W — tungsten, Au — gold, U — uranium). Fossil fuels are in red (C — coal, L — lignite, P — petroleum, G — natural gas). Non-metallic minerals are in green (F — fluorite, K — potash, T — talc).

=== Climate ===
Metropolitan France's territory is relatively large and so its climate is not uniform and gives rise to the following climate nuances:

- The cool semi-arid climate (BSk) is found in the western part of the Bouches-du-Rhône area and the Roussillon plain of the Pyrénées-Orientales. Summers are hot, winters are cool winters. There is insufficient average annual rainfall in some years.
- The hot-summer Mediterranean climate (Csa) is found along the Gulf of Lion and further inland. Summers are hot and dry, winters are cool and autumns can be very rainy near the Cévennes.
- The warm-summer Mediterranean climate (Csb) is found in the northwestern part of Brittany and along the Gulf of Lion but higher in altitude, in the mountains. Summers are warm (but not hot) and dry, winters are cool and can be cold in the mountains and autumns are rainy.
- The humid subtropical climate (Cfa) is found in southwestern France, in the Toulouse area. In France, the humid subtropical climate is not as hot and humid as in the Southeastern United States. Summers are hot and wetter than in the Mediterranean Basin, and winters are cool and somewhat foggy in the plains.
- The oceanic climate (Cfb) concerns a large part of France, as far as Champagne and Burgundy and of course around the coasts of the Bay of Biscay, the English Channel and the North Sea. Summers are pleasantly warm (rarely hot), somewhat dry and winters are cool and wet.
- The subalpine oceanic climate (Cfc) is found at the foot of the Pyrenees, Massif Central and western French Alps as in the mountains of the Vercors Massif and the Chartreuse Mountains. Summers are short, cool and wet, and winters are moderately cold, long and snowy.
- The warm-summer dry-summer continental climate (Dsb) is found in all the mountainous regions of Southern France between 700 and 1,400 metres a.s.l. Summers are pleasantly warm and dry, and winters are very cold and snowy.
- The cool-summer dry-summer continental climate (Dsc) is found in all the mountainous regions of Southern France between 1,400 and 2,300-2,400 metres a.s.l. Summers are cool, short and dry, and winters are very cold and snowy.
- The warm-summer humid continental climate (Dfb) is found in the far east of France or in all the mountain ranges far from the ocean or the sea. Summers are warm to hot and stormy and winters are cold and somewhat dry, and snow is not uncommon. Above 500–600 meters a.s.l in the northeastern quarter of France, the snowpack can persist throughout the winter. In January 1985, in Mouthe, the temperature has dropped under −41.2 °C (−42.2 °F).
- The subalpine climate (Dfc) is found in all the mountainous regions of France between 1,100-1,400 meters a.s.l in the Vosges mountains and 1,400-2,300 metres a.s.l in the southern French Alps or in the Pyrenees. Summers are cool, short and stormy while winters are very cold, long and snowy.
- The alpine tundra climate (ET) is found in all the mountainous regions of France, generally above 2,000 or 2,300-2,400 metres a.s.l depending on the mountain ranges. Summers are chilly, stormy and windy and winters are extremely cold, long and snowy.
- The ice cap climate (EF) is found in all the mountainous regions of France that have a glacier, in the highest mountains of the Alps or the Pyrenees. The climate in the Mont Blanc massif (up to 4,810 meters a.s.l) is an ice cap climate for example. Summers are cold and wet and winters are extremely cold, long and snowy.

Climate change in France includes above average heating.

=== Elevation extremes ===
- Lowest point: Étang de Lavalduc, Bouches-du-Rhône -10 m
- Highest point: Mont Blanc 4,808 m

=== Land use ===
- Arable land: 33.40%
- Permanent crops: 1.83%
- Other: 64.77% (2007)

Irrigated land: 26,420 km^{2} (2007)

Total renewable water resources: 211 km^{3} (2011)

Freshwater withdrawal (domestic/industrial/agricultural): 31.62 km^{3}/yr (19%/71%/10%) (512.1 m^{3}/yr per capita) (2009)

=== Natural resources ===
Coal, iron ore, bauxite, zinc, uranium, antimony, arsenic, potash, feldspar, fluorspar, gypsum, timber, fish, gold, clay, petroleum, silver

=== Natural hazards ===
Flooding, Hailstorms, avalanches, midwinter windstorms, drought, forest fires in the south near the Mediterranean

=== Environment ===
The region that now comprises France consisted of open grassland during the Pleistocene Ice Age. France gradually became forested as the glaciers retreated starting in 10,000 BC, but clearing of these primeval forests began in Neolithic times. These forests were still fairly extensive until the medieval era.

In prehistoric times, France was home to large predatory animals such as wolves and brown bears, as well as herbivores such as elk. The larger fauna have disappeared outside the Pyrenees Mountains where bears live as a protected species. Smaller animals include martens, wild pigs, foxes, weasels, bats, rodents, rabbits, and assorted birds.

By the 15th century, France had largely been denuded of its forests and was forced to rely on Scandinavia and their North American colonies for lumber. Significant remaining forested areas are in the Gascony region and north in the Alsace-Ardennes area. The Ardennes Forest was the scene of extensive fighting in both world wars.

The northcentral part of the region is dominated by the Paris Basin, which consists of a layered sequence of sedimentary rocks. Fertile soils over much of the area make good agricultural land. The Normandy coast to the northwest is characterized by high, chalk cliffs, while the Brittany coast (the peninsula to the west) is highly indented in places that deep valleys were drowned by the sea, and the Biscay coast to the southwest is marked by flat, sandy beaches.

A recent global remote sensing analysis suggested that there were 1,433 km^{2} of tidal flats in France, making it the 23rd ranked country in terms of tidal flat area.

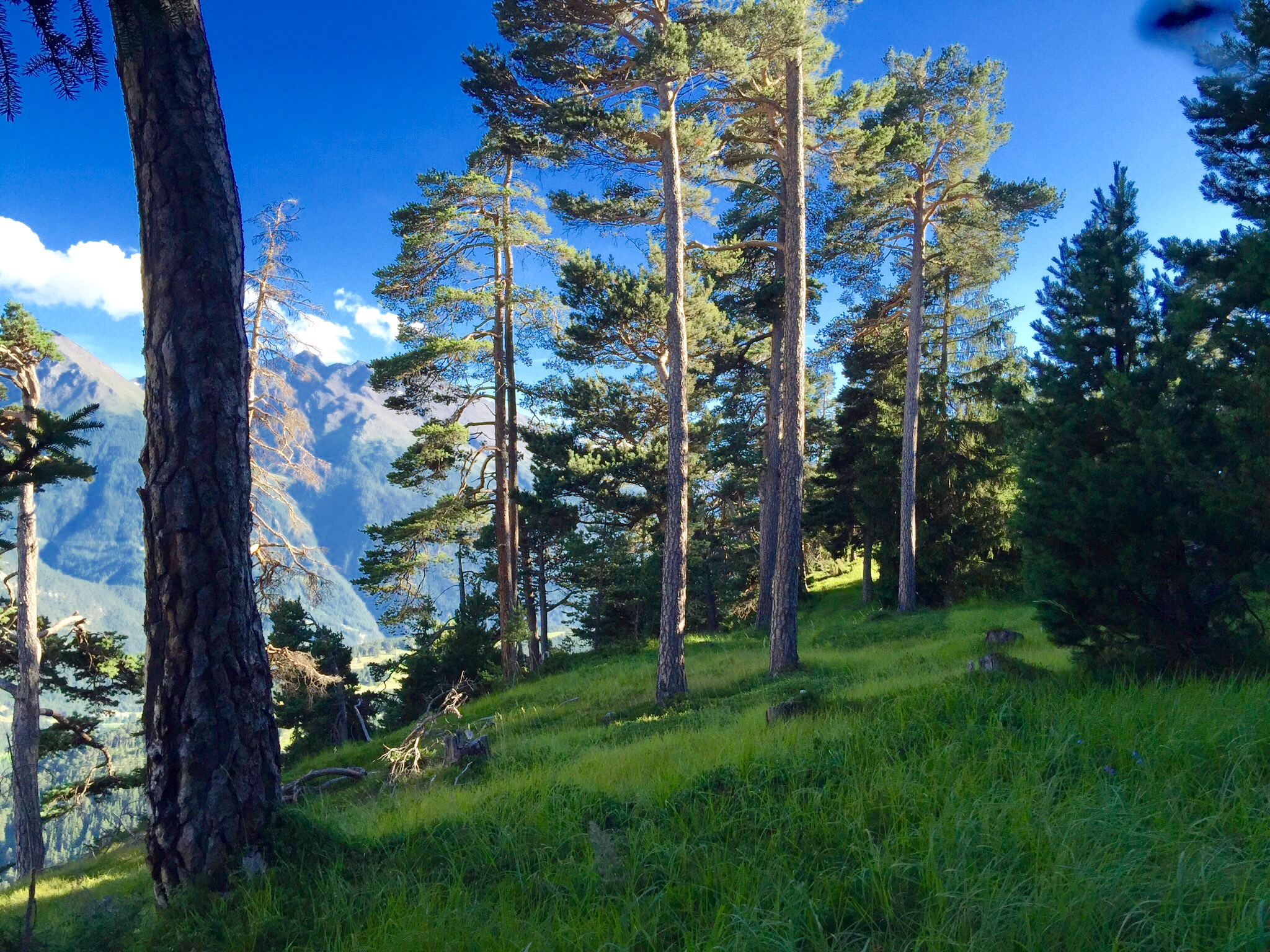
Forest in Sollières-Sardières (Natura 2000 site).

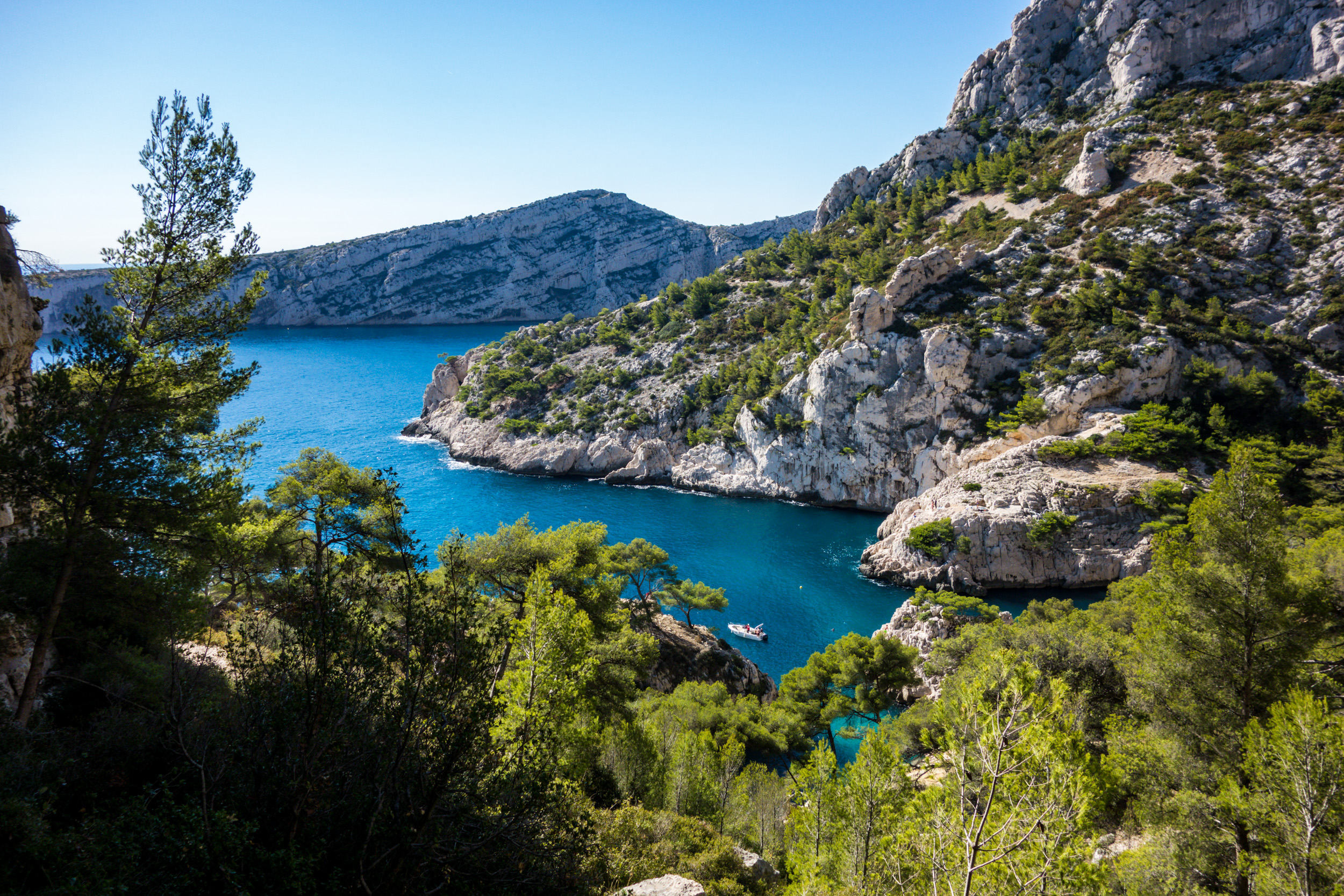
Calanques National Park in Bouches-du-Rhône

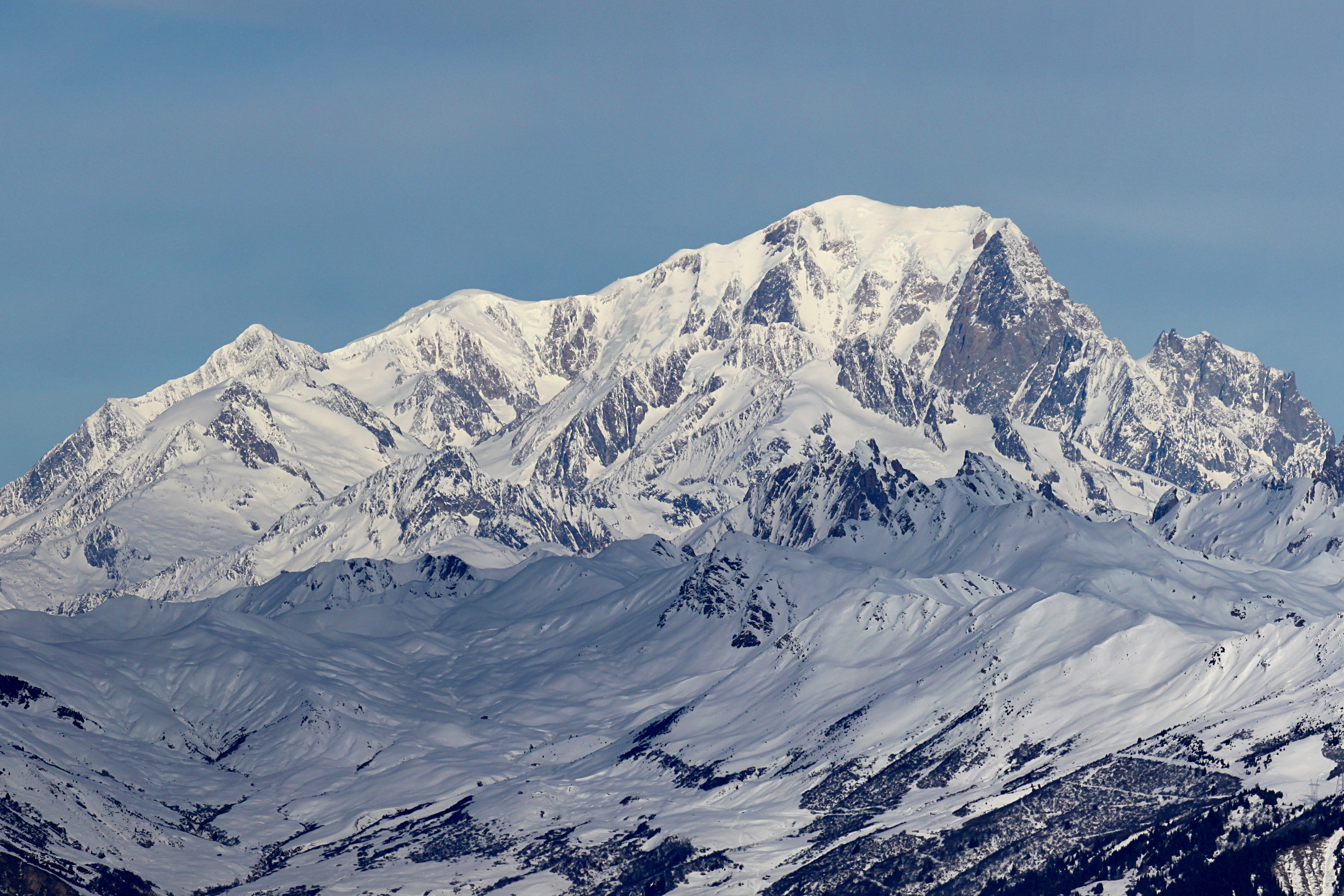
Mont Blanc, the highest summit in Western Europe

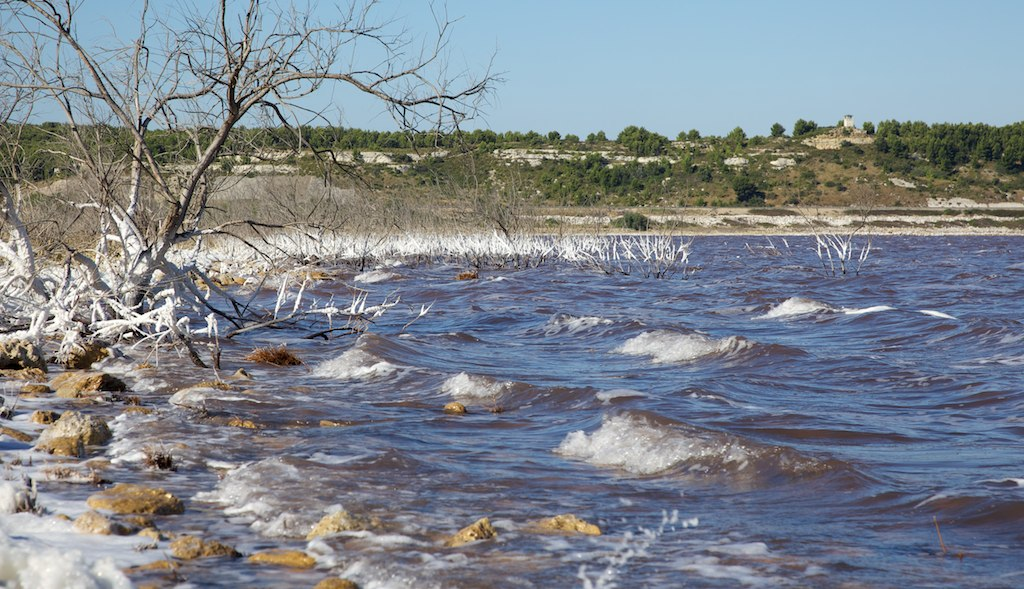
Étang de Lavalduc, the lowest point in France

== Political geography ==
=== Internal divisions ===
Regions and departments of Metropolitan France in 2016.

France has several levels of internal divisions. The first-level administrative division of Metropolitan France is regions. Also the French Republic has sovereignty over several other territories, with various administrative levels.

- Metropolitan (i.e. European) France is divided into 12 régions and 1 territorial collectivity, Corsica. However, Corsica is referred to as a region in common speech. These regions are subdivided into 96 départements, which are further divided into 320 arrondissements, which are further divided into 1,995 cantons, which are further divided into 34,836 communes (as of 1/1/2021).
- Five overseas regions (régions d'outre-mer, or ROM): Guadeloupe, French Guiana, Martinique, Mayotte, and Réunion, with identical status to metropolitan regions. Each of these overseas regions also being an overseas département (département d'outre-mer, or DOM), with the same status as a département of metropolitan France. This double structure (région/département) is new, due to the recent extension of the regional scheme to the overseas départements, and may soon transform into a single structure, with the merger of the regional and departmental assemblies. Another proposed change is that new départements are created such as in the case of Réunion, where it has been proposed to create a second département in the south of the island, with the région of Réunion above these two départements.
- Four overseas collectivities (collectivités d'outre-mer, or COM): Saint-Pierre and Miquelon, Saint Barthélemy, Saint Martin, and Wallis and Futuna.
- One overseas "country" (pays d'outre-mer, or POM): French Polynesia. In 2003 it became an overseas collectivity (or COM). Its statutory law of 27 February 2004 gives it the particular designation of overseas country inside the Republic (or POM), but without legal modification of its status.
- One sui generis collectivity (collectivité sui generis): New Caledonia, whose status is unique in the French Republic.
- One overseas territory (territoire d'outre-mer, or TOM): the French Southern and Antarctic Lands divided into 5 districts: Kerguelen Islands, Crozet Islands, Île Amsterdam and Île Saint-Paul, Adélie Land, and the Scattered islands (Banc du Geyser, Bassas da India, Europa, Juan de Nova, Glorioso, and Tromelin).
- One uninhabited island in the Pacific Ocean off the coast of Mexico that belongs directly to the central government public land and is administered by the high-commissioner of the French Republic in French Polynesia: Clipperton.

=== Boundaries ===
- Land boundaries:
  - Total: 3,966.2 kilometres (2,464.5 mi)
  - 2,751 kilometres (1,709 mi) (Metropolitan), 1,205 kilometres (749 mi) (French Guiana) 10.2 kilometres (6.3 mi) (Saint Martin)
- Border countries:
  - Andorra 55 kilometres (34 mi), Belgium 556 kilometres (345 mi), Germany 450 kilometres (280 mi), Italy 476 kilometres (296 mi), Luxembourg 69 kilometres (43 mi), Monaco 6 kilometres (3.7 mi), Spain 646 kilometres (401 mi), Switzerland 525 kilometres (326 mi) (Metropolitan)
  - Brazil 649 kilometres (403 mi), Suriname 556 kilometres (345 mi) (French Guiana)
  - Sint Maarten 10.2 kilometres (6.3 mi) (Saint Martin)
- Coastline: 5,500 kilometres (3,400 mi) (Metropolitan). 20,000 kilometres (12,000 mi) including all overseas territories.
- Maritime claims:
  - Territorial sea: 12 nmi (22.2 km; 13.8 mi)
  - Contiguous zone: 24 nmi (44.4 km; 27.6 mi)
  - Exclusive economic zone: 334,604 km^{2} (129,191.3 mi^{2}) only in Europe. 11,691,000 km^{2} (4,513,920.3 mi^{2}) including all overseas territories. The 200 nmi (370.4 km; 230.2 mi) does not apply to the Mediterranean Sea
  - Continental shelf: 200 metres (660 ft) depth or to the depth of exploitation
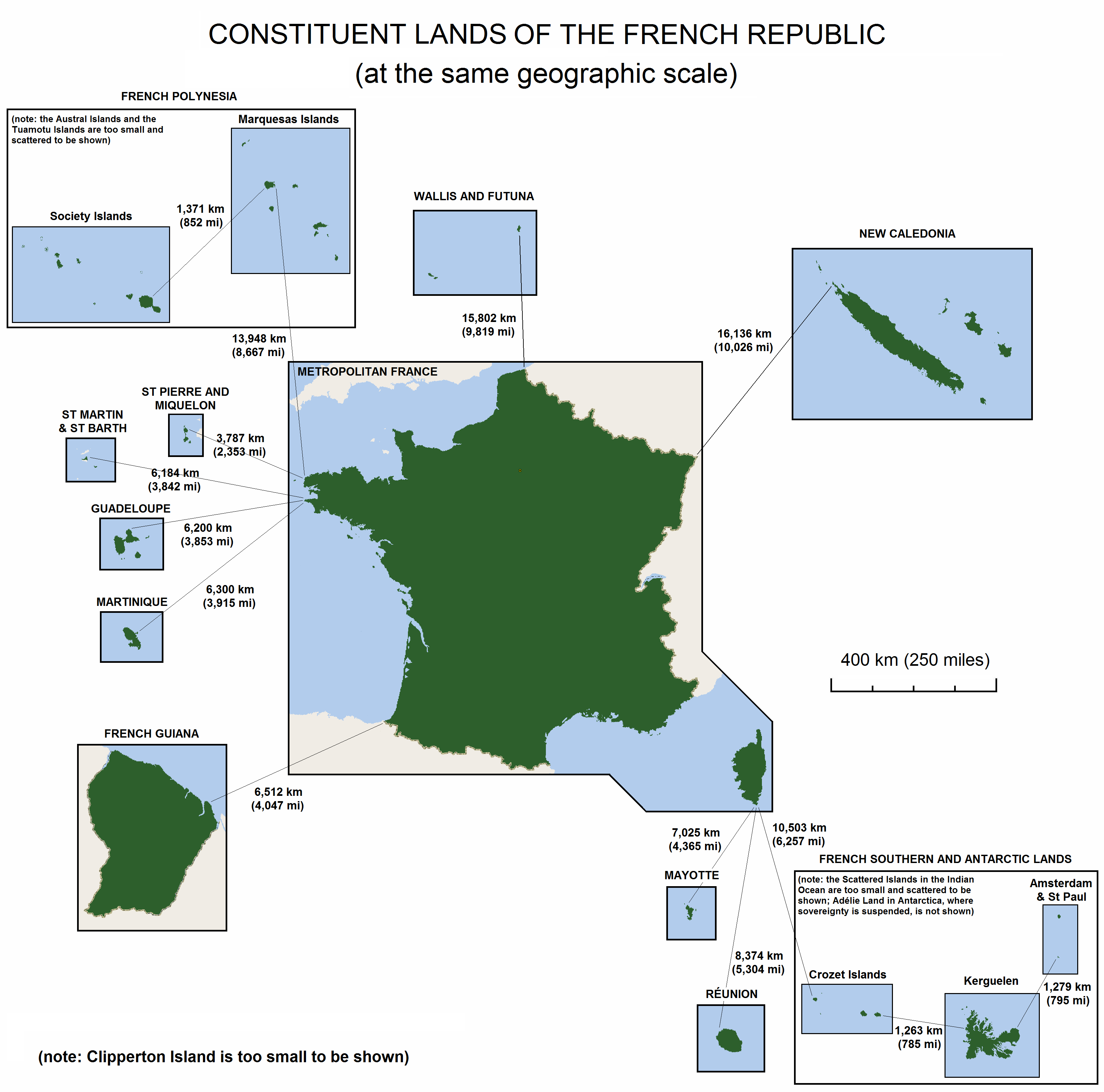
The lands making up the French Republic, shown at the same geographic scale.

French Guiana

The exclusive economic zones of France

== Extreme points ==
This is a list of the extreme points of France; the points that are farther north, south, east or west than any other location.

=== France (mainland Europe) ===
- Northernmost point — Bray-Dunes, Nord at 51°5′22″N 2°32′43″E
- Southernmost point — Puig de Comanegra, Lamanère, Pyrénées-Orientales at 42°19′58″N 2°31′51″E
- Westernmost point — Pointe de Corsen, Plouarzel, Finistère at 48°24′51″N 4°47′44″W
- Easternmost point — Lauterbourg, Bas Rhin at 48°58′2″N 8°13′53″E

=== France (metropolitan) ===
- Northernmost point — Bray-Dunes, Nord at 51°04′N 2°31′E
- Southernmost point — Îles Lavezzi (off Corsica), Bonifacio, Corse-du-Sud at 41°20′N 9°15′E
- Westernmost point — Isle of Ushant (off Brittany), Finistère at 48°27′N 5°08′W
- Easternmost point — San-Giuliano (near Cervione), Haute-Corse at 42°17′N 9°33′E

=== France (including départements d'outre mer) ===
- Northernmost point — Bray-Dunes, Nord at 51°04′N 2°31′E
- Southernmost point — Saint-Joseph, Réunion at 21°23′S 55°39′E
- Westernmost point — Pointe-Noire, Guadeloupe at 16°16′N 61°48′W
- Easternmost point — Sainte-Rose, Réunion at 21°11′S 55°50′E

=== France (all territory of the French Republic) ===
- Northernmost point : Bray-Dunes, Nord at 51°04′N 2°31′E
- Southernmost point : îles de Boynes, Kerguelen Islands, French Southern and Antarctic Lands at 50°01′S 68°52′E
- Westernmost point : Toloke, Futuna, Wallis and Futuna at 14°15′S 178°10′W
- Easternmost point : Hunter Island, New Caledonia at 22°31′S 172°6′E

== Temperature extremes ==
These are the extreme temperatures in France.

Climate data for France
Month	Jan	Feb	Mar	Apr	May	Jun	Jul	Aug	Sep	Oct	Nov	Dec	Year
Record high °C (°F)	23.3 (73.9)	28.3 (82.9)	29.2 (84.6)	32.1 (89.8)	35.6 (96.1)	45.9 (114.6)	43.9 (111.0)	44.1 (111.4)	38.0 (100.4)	35.8 (96.4)	27.1 (80.8)	26.9 (80.4)	45.9 (114.6)
Record low °C (°F)	−41.0 (−41.8)	−35 (−31)	−32.0 (−25.6)	−19.0 (−2.2)	−10 (14)	−4.0 (24.8)	−4.0 (24.8)	−4.0 (24.8)	−7.0 (19.4)	−14.0 (6.8)	−29.0 (−20.2)	−37.0 (−34.6)	−41.0 (−41.8)

== See also ==
- List of fifteen largest French metropolitan areas by population
- Géoportail
- Institut géographique national

General:

- Geography of Europe
