= Étang de Lavalduc =

Saltwater lagoon in France near the Mediterranean Sea

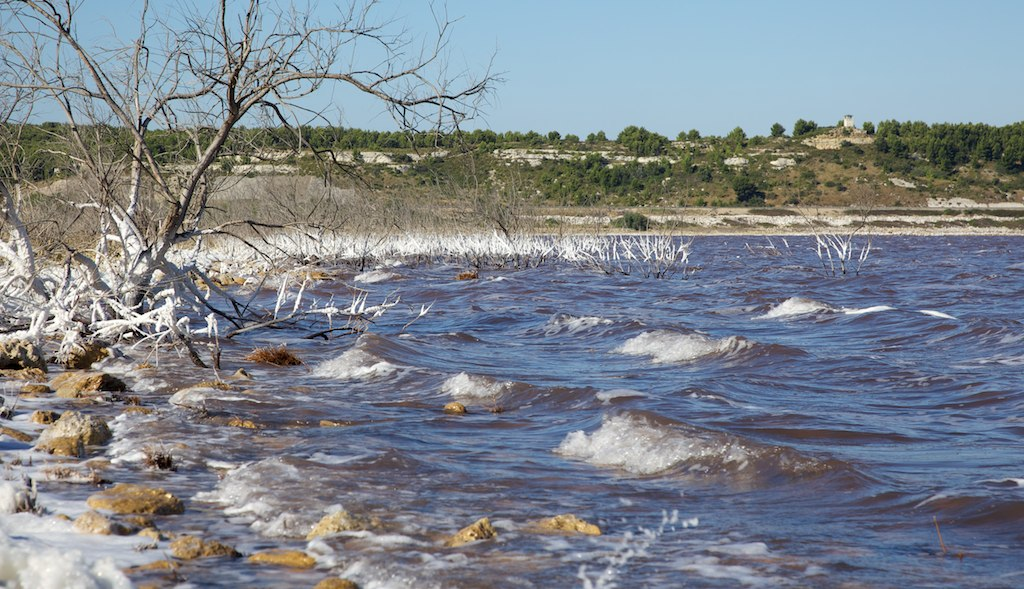

- Location within Provence-Alpes-Côte d'Azur
- Location: Bouches-du-Rhône, Provence, France
- Coordinates: 43°27′51″N 4°58′8″E
- Type: lagoon
- Basin countries: France
- Surface area: 3.54 km^{2} (1.37 sq mi)
- Surface elevation: −10 m (−33 ft)

Étang de Lavalduc, or La Valduc, is a saltwater lagoon with varying levels of salinity in the Mediterranean Sea, west of the Étang de Berre and north of Fos-sur-Mer. The property belongs to the Salins du Midi company, which has made it a storage tank for brine. It is located in three municipalities: Saint-Mitre-les-Remparts, Istres and Fos-sur-Mer, Bouches-du-Rhône. Its coloring of an iridescent pink blue is due to the presence of small crustaceans such as Artemia salina.

Located at an average altitude of about 10 m below sea level, it is the lowest point in France.

== Geography ==
=== Topography ===
The Étang de Lavalduc is, along with the Étang de Pourra, the Étang de Citis, the Étang de Engrenier, the Étang de Rassuen and the Étang de Estomac, part of the five ponds grouped between the Étang de Berre and the Gulf of Fos in the Mediterranean, near the plain of La Crau and the Parc naturel régional de Camargue.

The lagoon is located inside a basin of 2.5 x 1.750 km, formed by hydro-wind and even snow-wind, which it almost completely fills. It is the result of the action of snow and the mistral at the end of the Riss glaciation. A permanent body of water, at variable level, therefore with a fluctuating surface area, it is supplied regularly by injections of industrial brine. It is part of the municipalities of Istres, Saint-Mitre-les-Remparts and Fos-sur-Mer, according to a demarcation kept in the municipal archives of Saint-Miter, dated 15 April 1551. It is bordered by the east and west by hills covered with scrubland and pine forests. To the south and north, there are palustrine formations and elements of riparian forests.

=== Hydrography ===
A natural receptacle, it received from the Fanfarigoule, a source located north of the pond, so much water in 1960 that its level rose by three meters. The place is considered by geographers as the one where evaporation is the strongest in France. The Compagnie des Salins du Midi, which owned it, had to drain it in 1969 by pumping the water out into the sea through a canal that was once used. An underground channel was then built to divert water from the Crau. It connects to the Étang de Cities and, formerly, an open-air channel made it possible to supply Rassuen with the help of a fire pump. Archimedes' screws brought the water up to the western plateau, between the ponds of Estomac and Lavalduc.

In 1821, on Christmas Eve, a tidal wave six meters high, which lasted five days, brought the Mediterranean into the Étang de Engrenier and Lavalduc. During the earthquake of 1909, the waters of the important hydrological network of Crau significantly increased the supply of fresh water.

=== Salinity ===
The salinity of the Étang de Lavalduc is artificial, since it comes from the brine injected by underground pipes from the oil silos at Manosque. In 1984, it was 360 g l − 1, i.e. 97% saturated (seawater from 2 to 6% with 35 g l − 1; the Dead Sea at 27.5% with 275 g l − 1). This brine is reserved for chemical use and not suitable for consumption, which represents 3,000,000 m^{3} (110,000,000 cu ft) stored in the Étang de Engrenier and Lavalduc.

Although watertight, and nothing proving the existence of a channel in antiquity, or that the ensemble formed with Engrenier constituted a deep cove, the two Étangs were salted and constituted an exploited reserve. The only reasonable explanation to date and proven by historical facts is that of a periodic supply by "salivades", that is to say seawater inflows during high tides or storms. This proposition is confirmed by Denizot, who mentions in particular a storm in 1821.

On the north shore of the Étang de Lavalduc, traces of saline largely emerged. Likewise on the planar isthmus of Aren that separates Lavalduc d'Engrenier.

On 12 March 2007, a sealing problem on a wellhead sent fuel oil to a retention basin, which in turn sent hydrocarbons in the leaching brine in the Étang de Engrenier and Lavalduc.

== See also ==
- Hambach surface mine - Lowest human made point in the European Union
- Mont Blanc - Highest point in France and the European Union
