= Charles Rostaing =

French linguist

- Born: 9 October 1904; Istres, France
- Died: 24 April 1999 (aged 94); Saint-Mitre-les-Remparts, France
- Occupation: Toponomist

Charles Rostaing (French pronunciation: [ʃaʁl ʁɔstɛ̃]; 9 October 1904 – 24 April 1999) was a French linguist who specialised in toponymy.

== Biography ==
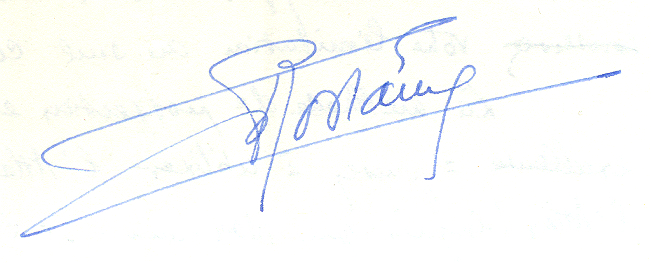
Signature of Charles Rostaing (1904-1999) on 13 December 1984.

Charles Rostaing was one of the most famous specialists in French place names in general and Provence in particular of the 20th century. He was also the grandfather of the biographer Alain Wodrascka.

After his higher studies from 1923 to 1926 in Aix-en-Provence where he was a pupil of Georges Lote and Emile Ripert, he obtained his Agrégation in grammar in 1928. He was a high school teacher in Alès, Toulon, and Nice then in Paris from 1934 to 1946. Just before the defence of his thesis he entered higher education in October 1946 as a lecturer in the language and literature of Provence in the Faculty of Arts of Aix-en-Provence.

In the following year after defending his thesis, he became a senior lecturer and then Professor of classic French language and literature in 1948 before succeeding Auguste Brun, in 1952, to the Chair of Romance languages - a post he held until his departure for the Sorbonne in 1967. He was director of the Centre for Education and Research for Occitan from 1967 to 1974.

Majoral of Félibrige in 1952, he became the ninth capoulié (president) from 1956 to 1962.

== Bibliography ==
Sources: University System documentation (in French) • National Library of France (in French) • Virtual International Authority File • Library of Congress • Gemeinsame Normdatei (in German) • WorldCat

=== Written by Charles Rostaing only ===
- Place names, Presses Universitaires de France Collection What do I know?, 1st edition 1945, 7th edition 1969, reprinted in 1992
- Essay on the toponymy of Provence, Ed. d'Artrey, Paris, 1950
- Essay on the toponymy of Provence (from the beginning to the barbarian invasions), Laffitte Reprints, Marseille, 1973 (1st edition 1950)
- Essay on the toponymy of Provence, Ed. Jeanne Laffitte, Marseille, 1994

=== Written in collaboration ===
- Albert Dauzat and Charles Rostaing, Etymological dictionary of place names in France, Ed. Larousse, 1968
- Charles Rostaing and Rene Jouveau, Summary of Provencal literature, Saint-Rémy-de-Provence, 1972
- Albert Dauzat and Charles Rostaing, Etymological dictionary of place names in France, 2nd edition Librairie Guénégaud, Paris 1978
- Albert Dauzat, Gaston Deslandes, and Charles Rostaing, Etymological dictionary of names of rivers and mountains in France, Klincksieck, 1978

== See also ==
=== Related Items ===
- Linguistics
- Félibrige
- Occitan language
- Occitan literature
