= Centres régionaux opérationnels de surveillance et de sauvetage =

In France, the seven centres régionaux opérationnels de surveillance et de sauvetage (Regional Operating Surveillance and Rescue Centres; French acronym CROSS) coordinate maritime security and surveillance. CROSS conducts their activities under the authority of the maritime prefects in mainland France and government representatives for state action at sea in Overseas France.

Under the Ministry of Ecological Transition, they are managed by Affaires Maritimes (Maritime Matters Department) administrators and provided with staff from the department and the French Navy. Military officers conduct survey and rescue coordination under the Directions Interregionales des Affaires Maritimes (Interregional Directions of the Maritime Matters, DIRM) on the mainland and the Directions Maritimes in Overseas France; both agencies implement the public policies about maritime security, protection of the environment, resource management, maritime-activities regulation, and education.

== History ==
Before the creation of CROSS, responsibility for rescues at sea in France was shared by the French Navy (on the open sea) and the Affaires Maritimes (near the coast). Each district chief was responsible for his area. Leisure boating and fishing led to an increase on accidents after 1960, and the district tools became inadequate.

The Centre Régional Operational de Défence (Defence Operational Regional Center, CROD) was created in 1966 in Lorient and charged with search and rescue operations. Two years later, it became the Atlantic Cross and moved to Etel.

CROSS has been developed along all of France's coastlines. Total coverage was achieved in 1982 with the creation of Cross-Corsen near Brest after the sinking of the Amoco Cadiz. During the 1990s, the Centres Operationnels de Sauvetage (COS) were created in Overseas France. COS Martinique (Antilles) was the first in 1992 (becoming CROSS Antilles-Guyane (French Guiana) in 2001), followed by COS La Réunion in 2004. The network was completed by the MRCC (Maritime Rescue Coordination Centres) of Nouméa (New Caledonia) and the JRCC (Joint Rescue Coordination Centre) of Tahiti (French Polynesia), which has conducted maritime and aerial rescues since 2016.

== Missions ==
=== Search and rescue ===
CROSS manages search-and-rescue operations and monitors alerts around the clock by radio and phone, including distress beacons (EPIRB) and satellite systems. Over 10,000 operations are managed annually for fishing boats, commercial ships (such as tankers and cargo ships), yachting, and leisure sailing. CROSS belongs to the network of Maritime Rescue Coordination Centers (MRCC), as defined by the SAR Convention.

=== Monitoring sea traffic ===
Monitoring sea traffic is crucial in the English Channel, which has 20 percent of global traffic (about 300,000 ships annually). CROSS receives and analyses mandatory reports sent by all ships traversing the English Channel and using one of the three traffic separation schemes off the coast of Ushant (Ouessant) and across the Strait of Dover. It primarily follows ships carrying potentially polluting or dangerous freight, following vessels to detect anomalous routes and any behavior that could introduce risks for human life or the environment; identifies violators of the International Regulations for Preventing Collisions at Sea (IRPCS / RIPAM), records breaches of these rules, and sends them to judicial authorities.

=== Monitoring pollution ===
CROSS registers information about marine pollution and looks for its cause. Under the Maritime Prefects, it contributes to the implementation of the ORSEC (ORGanisation des SECours) measures of the POLMAR (POLlution MARine) plan to combat accidental marine pollution.

=== Monitoring fishing operations ===
The Centre National de Surveillance des Pêches (Fishery Survey National Centre, CNSP), hosted by CROSS in Etel, coordinates maritime and aerial tools at disposition. The European Union has implemented a satellite survey system for fishing boats which the CNSP monitors in French waters, working with similar centers of other EU member states.

=== Broadcasting maritime safety information ===
CROSS broadcasts safety information to ships in zone A1, using marine VHF frequencies for regular forecasts or special meteorological forecasts if winds are near gale force (7 on the Beaufort scale). In zone A2, it uses Navetex broadcasts for both forecasts or avis urgent pour les navigateurs (AVURNAV).

== Locations ==
Coastal France:

- CROSS Gris-Nez in Wissant: Eastern English Channel, including the Strait of Dover (Pas-de-Calais) from the Franco-Belgian border to the Cap d'Antifer Lighthouse
- CROSS Jobourg: Central channel from Cap d'Antifer to Mont-Saint-Michel
- CROSS Corsen in Plouarzel: Western channel from Mont-Saint-Michel to Point Penmarc'h
- CROSS Étel: Bay of Biscay From Point Penmarc'h to the Franco-Spanish border
- CROSS La Garde: Mediterranean Sea
- Sous CROSS Corse (a.k.a. CROSS-MED) in Ajaccio, a secondary station

Overseas France:

- CROSS Antilles-French Guiana in Fort-de-France: Caribbean Sea
- CROSS de la Réunion: Southern Indian Ocean
- JRCC Polynésie française in Papeete (Tahiti): Pacific Ocean; MRCC (maritime) and ARCC (air)
- MRCC of French Guiana in Cayenne
- MRCC Nouvelle-Calédonie in Nouméa: Pacific Ocean
- SAR station in Mayotte, Indian Ocean
- SAR station on Saint-Pierre-et-Miquelon: North-western Atlantic Ocean

=== Gris-Nez (east channel – Strait of Dover / Pas-de-Calais) ===
CROSS Griz-Nez surveys maritime traffic in the Traffic Separation Scheme of the Strait of Dover (Pas-de-Calais). It is the point of entry for foreign search and rescue centers, cooperating with the MRCC within the framework of the Global Maritime Distress and Safety System (GMDSS).

=== Jobourg (central channel) ===
CROSS Jobourg, on the tip of the Cotentin Peninsula in the center of the channel, deals with the maritime navigation survey of the Casquets Traffic Separation Scheme and rescues at sea. It is the reference center for maritime pollution, and hosts the Maritime Information System management.

=== Corsen (west channel – Iroise Sea) ===
In addition to coordinating rescue operations from Mont-Saint-Michel to Point Penmarc'h, CROSS Corsen is in charge of the Ouessant Traffic Separation Scheme on the tip of Brittany and detection radar on the Stiff tower on the island of Ushant (the westernmost point of mainland France).

=== Etel (Bay of Biscay) ===
CROSS Etel is responsible for the area from Point Penmarc'h to the Franco-Spanish border. In addition to its other missions (including search and rescue, primarily for yachting), CROSS Etel hosts the Centre National de Surveillance des Pêches (National Fisheries Survey Centre, CNSP) and the Centre d'Appui au Contrôle de l'Environnement marin (Environment Control Support Centre, CACEM). The CNSP participates in the sea-fisheries survey in the French Zone Economique Exclusive (ZEE) in mainland and Overseas France.

=== La Garde (Méditerranea) ===
The main centre of CROSS Méditerranea, CROSS Lagarde is in the bay of Toulon. It performs search and rescue, primarily for yachting and other leisure boating.

=== Corsica ===
On the Gulf of Ajaccio in the Aspretto naval base, it covers 20 nautical miles around Corsica from 9:00 am to 7:00 pm (8:00 am to 10:00 pm in summer). At night, CROSS Lagarde covers the entire French Mediterranean zone.

=== Antilles-Guyane (Tropical Atlantic) ===
CROSS Antilles-Guyane in Fort-de-France, Martinique, covers about 3 million km^{2} for rescue coordination and sea assistance. It also protects the environment and maritime resources connected with the mainland CROSS.

=== Réunion (South Indian Ocean) ===
Located at Port des Galets in La Réunion, CROSS Réunion has covered a 5.6 million km^{2} area since 2004.

=== Nouméa (New Caledonia and Vanuatu) ===
The Nouméa MRCC oversees the CROSS missions under the Haut Commissaire de la Republique en Nouvelle-Caledonie (Republic High Commissioner in New Caledonia) and the Maritime Zone Commandant. It covers 2.4 million km^{2}, including the Vanuatu archipelago. In inland areas (such as lagoons), the New Caledonia government has had rescue responsibility since 2011.

=== Tahiti (French Polynesia) ===
Created in 2016 by the merger of ARCC Faa'a and MRCC Papeete, the Tahiti JRCC has been located in Arue's French Polynesia armed-forces general quarters since 2017. Under the Republic High Commissioner, it has five missions: aerial and maritime search-and-rescue coordination, fisheries and navigation surveys, marine pollution observation, and the transmission of naval-security information. The JRCC covers about 12.5 million km^{2}, including the five French Polynesian archipelagos.

== Tools ==
CROSS uses:

- patrol ships and speedboats of the Affaires Maritimes,
- ships, planes, helicopters, and survey towers (sémaphores) of the French Navy,
- planes, helicopters, diving, and medical staff from the French Air Force,
- speedboats, planes, and helicopters from French Customs,
- speedboats and helicopters from the Gendarmerie Nationale, and
- helicopters from the Sécurité Civile.

Speedboats and all-weather canoes from the Société Nationale de Sauvetage en Mer (National at Sea Rescue Society, SNSM) contribute to more than 40 percent of search-and-rescue operations. Community firefighters and lifeguards can be used, as well as other ships or yachts. When a sea operation requires medical assistance, CROSS relies on the Centre de Consultation Médicale Maritime de Toulouse (CCMM) and the Service d'Assistance Médicale Urgente (SAMU and SMUR).

== Radio communications ==
CROSS has a communications network consisting of 70 shore radio sites and AIS antennas and four radar stations on the Channel to survey maritime navigation. Four satellite networks are used:

- Argos (fisheries)
- Inmarsat (GMDSS) communications
- COSPAS-SARSAT (search and rescue)
- CleanSeaNet (pollution)

=== Frequencies and modes ===
Mainland CROSS principally uses the VHF marine radio band between 156.025 and 162.525 MHz FM and the mediumwave (MF) marine band from 1605 to 4000 kHz. Meteorological forecasts are broadcast on VHF and MF as part of the GMDSS at particular times, with AVURNAV (Urgent advice to Navigators) or BMS (Special Meteorological Bulletin) as needed. Marine VHF channel 16, 2182 kHZ, and DSC (Digital Selective Calling) channel 70 (2187.5 kHz) are used. French-language AVURNAV or BMS NAVTEX broadcasts use 490 kHz. In overseas France, CROSS uses INMARSAT satellite communications.

== Emergency phone number ==
Like the other SAMU emergency call centers, CROSS has been allocated its own toll-free phone number (196) since November 2014. Using this number, CROSS can ask a mobile operator to locate the mobile phone of a person dealing with an emergency at sea.
