= Torra di Fiurentina =

Genoese coastal defence tower in Corsica

Tower of Fiurentina
- Torra di Fiurentina (Corsican)
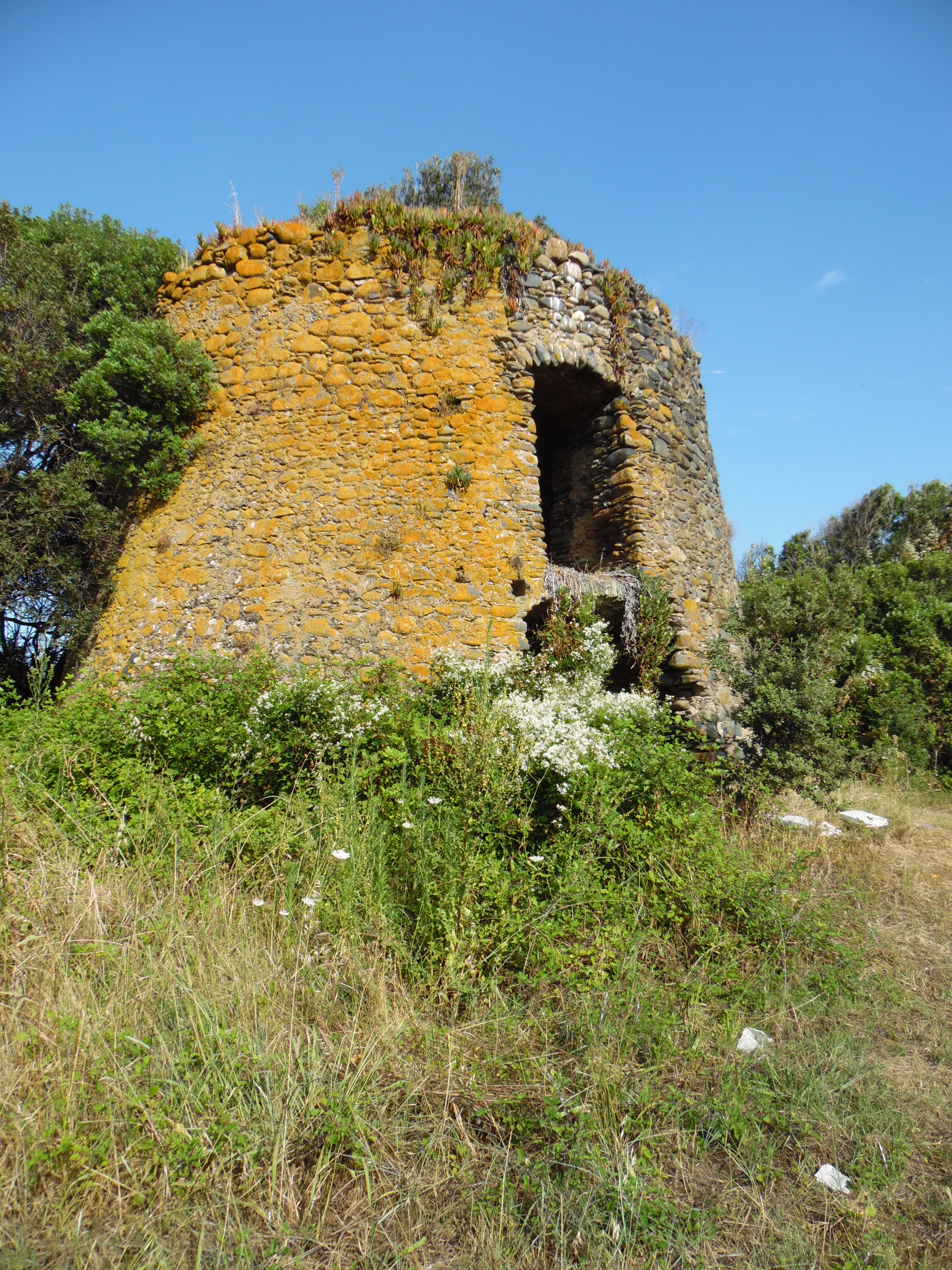

- Location within Corsica
- 42°17′0″N 9°33′34″E

History
- Built: Second half 16th century

The Tower of Fiurentina (Corsican: Torra di Fiurentina) is a ruined Genoese tower located in the commune of San-Giuliano on the east coast of the Corsica. Only part of the base survives.

The building of the tower began in 1575 and was completed in 1582. It was one of a series of coastal defences constructed by the Republic of Genoa between 1530 and 1620 to stem the attacks by Barbary pirates.

In 2007 the tower was added to the "General Inventory of Cultural Heritage" (Inventaire général du patrimoine culturel) maintained by the French Ministry of Culture. It is publicly owned.

== See also ==
- List of Genoese towers in Corsica
