= Canton of Istres =

Coordinates: 43.51°N 4.99°E

- Canton
- Situation of the canton of Istres in the department of Bouches-du-Rhône
- Country: France
- Region: Provence-Alpes-Côte d'Azur
- Department: Bouches-du-Rhône
- No. of communes: {{{nbcomm}}}
- Population (2023): 66,329
- INSEE code: 1310

The canton of Istres is an administrative division of the Bouches-du-Rhône department, in southeastern France. It was created at the French canton reorganisation which came into effect in March 2015. Its seat is in Istres.

It consists of the following communes:

1. Fos-sur-Mer
2. Istres
3. Saint-Mitre-les-Remparts
