= Pointe de Corsen =

Westernmost point of continental France

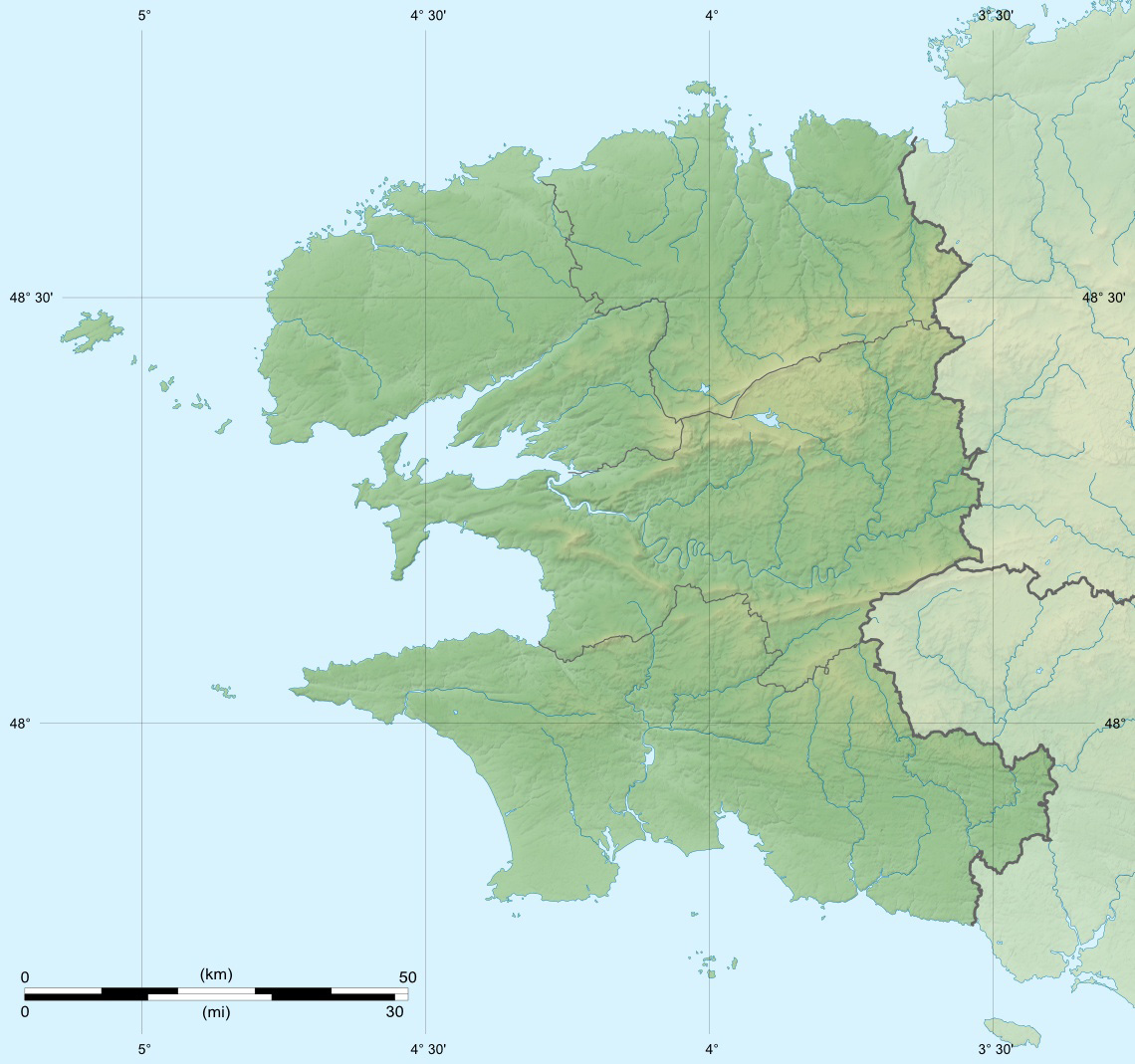
Location of Pointe de Corsen in Finistère

The Pointe de Corsen (Breton: Poent ar C'horsenn) is the westernmost point of continental France, located west of Brest in the commune of Plouarzel, Finistère, Brittany.

A CROSS sea monitoring site is located at the point. Pointe de Corsen, a steep and cliffy headland, is located at 48°24′52″N 4°47′44″W.

== See also ==
- Pointe du Raz
