= Puig de Comanegra =

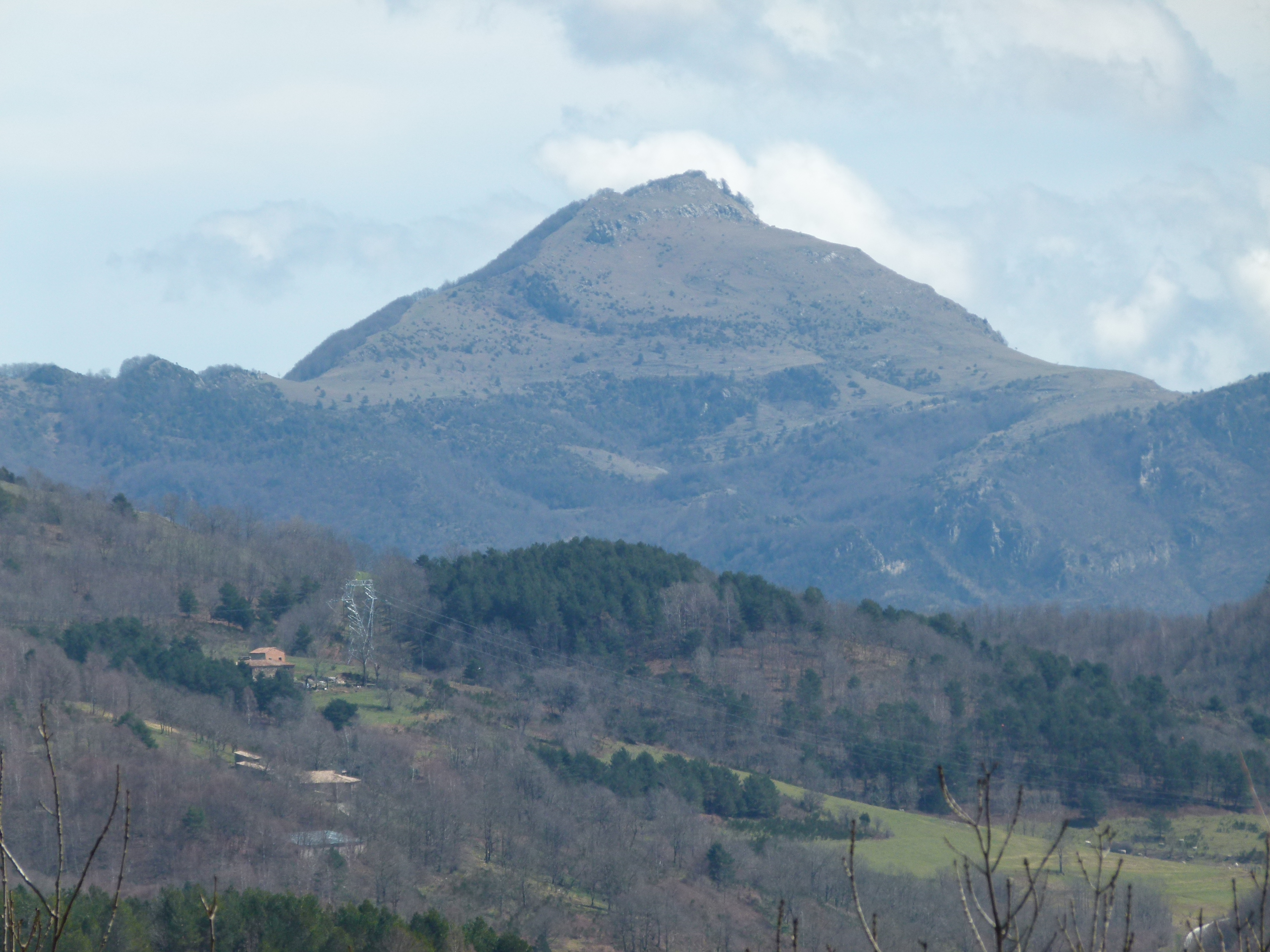

Highest point
- Elevation: 1,557.4 m (5,110 ft)
- Coordinates: 42°20′00″N 2°31′35″E

Geography
- Location within Pyrenees
- Location: Catalonia, Spain
- Parent range: Pyrenees

The Puig de Comanegra is a mountain of Catalonia, on the border between Spain and France. Located in the Pyrenees, it has an elevation of 1,557.4 metres (5,110 ft) above sea level. It is the southernmost point of mainland France.

== See also ==
- Mountains of Catalonia
