= Fos-sur-Mer =

Commune in Provence-Alpes-Côte d'Azur, France

- Commune
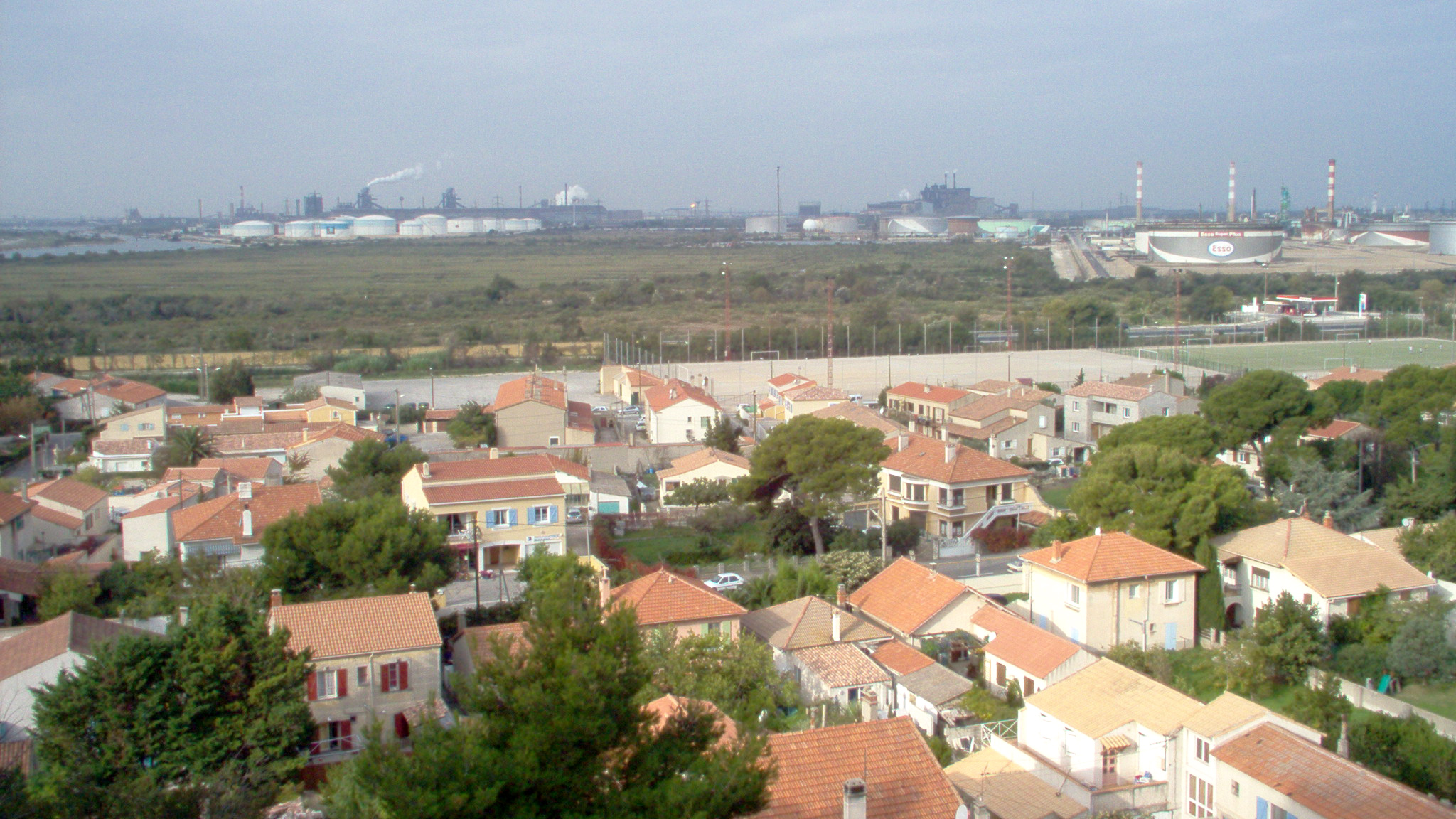
- Industrial zone

- Coat of arms
- Location of Fos-sur-Mer
- Location within France Location within Provence-Alpes-Côte d'Azur
- Coordinates: 43°26′25″N 4°56′55″E
- Country: France
- Region: Provence-Alpes-Côte d'Azur
- Department: Bouches-du-Rhône
- Arrondissement: Istres
- Canton: Istres
- Intercommunality: Aix-Marseille-Provence

Government
  - Mayor (2026–32): Philippe Maurizot
- Area^{1}: 92.31 km^{2} (35.64 sq mi)
- Highest elevation: 39 m (128 ft)
- Lowest elevation: 0 m (0 ft)
- Population (2023): 15,862
  - Density: 171.8/km^{2} (445.0/sq mi)
- Time zone: UTC+01:00 (CET)
  - Summer (DST): UTC+02:00 (CEST)
- INSEE/Postal code: 13039 /13270
- ^{1} French Land Register data, which excludes lakes, ponds, glaciers > 1 km^{2} (0.386 sq mi or 247 acres) and river estuaries.

Fos-sur-Mer (French pronunciation: [fɔs syʁ mɛʁ], literally Fos on Sea; Provençal: Fòs) is a port town and commune in the Bouches-du-Rhône department in southern France. It is one of the busiest ports in Europe despite its small size.

== Geography ==
Fos-sur-Mer is situated about 50 km (31 mi) north west of Marseille, on the Mediterranean coast, and to the west of the Étang de Berre. The city has 6 km (3.7 mi) of sand beach.

== Population ==
Historical population

Year	Pop.	±% p.a.
1793	550	—
1800	418	−3.84%
1806	579	+5.58%
1821	690	+1.18%
1831	916	+2.87%
1836	1,498	+10.34%
1841	1,862	+4.45%
1846	1,938	+0.80%
1851	1,984	+0.47%
1856	2,130	+1.43%
1861	2,218	+0.81%
1866	1,170	−12.01%
1872	1,170	+0.00%
1876	1,040	−2.90%
1881	1,140	+1.85%
1886	1,146	+0.11%
1891	1,464	+5.02%
1896	1,473	+0.12%
1901	1,393	−1.11%

Year	Pop.	±% p.a.
1906	996	−6.49%
1911	1,114	+2.26%
1921	1,223	+0.94%
1926	1,350	+2.00%
1931	1,531	+2.55%
1936	1,543	+0.16%
1946	1,645	+0.64%
1954	2,349	+4.55%
1962	2,898	+2.66%
1968	2,869	−0.17%
1975	6,709	+12.90%
1982	9,031	+4.34%
1990	11,605	+3.18%
1999	13,925	+2.05%
2007	15,832	+1.62%
2012	15,859	+0.03%
2017	15,494	−0.46%
2023	15,862	+0.39%

Source: EHESS and INSEE (1968-2023)

== Economy ==
Fos is the site of a major port development operated by the Autonomous Port of Marseille. The facilities include container handling terminals and a gas (methane) terminal. The waterside location of the industrial zone is attractive to heavy industry including steel.

The steel group ArcelorMittal has its Sollac Méditerranée plant here (merged into ArcelorMittal in 2006). The presence of the steel, chemistry and oil industries means that pollution levels are high.

== Sports ==
Fos-sur-Mer is home to Fos Provence Basket which plays its home games at the 2,000 seat Complexe sportif Parsemain.

== See also ==
- Communes of the Bouches-du-Rhône department
