= San-Giuliano, Haute-Corse =

San-Giuliano
- Commune
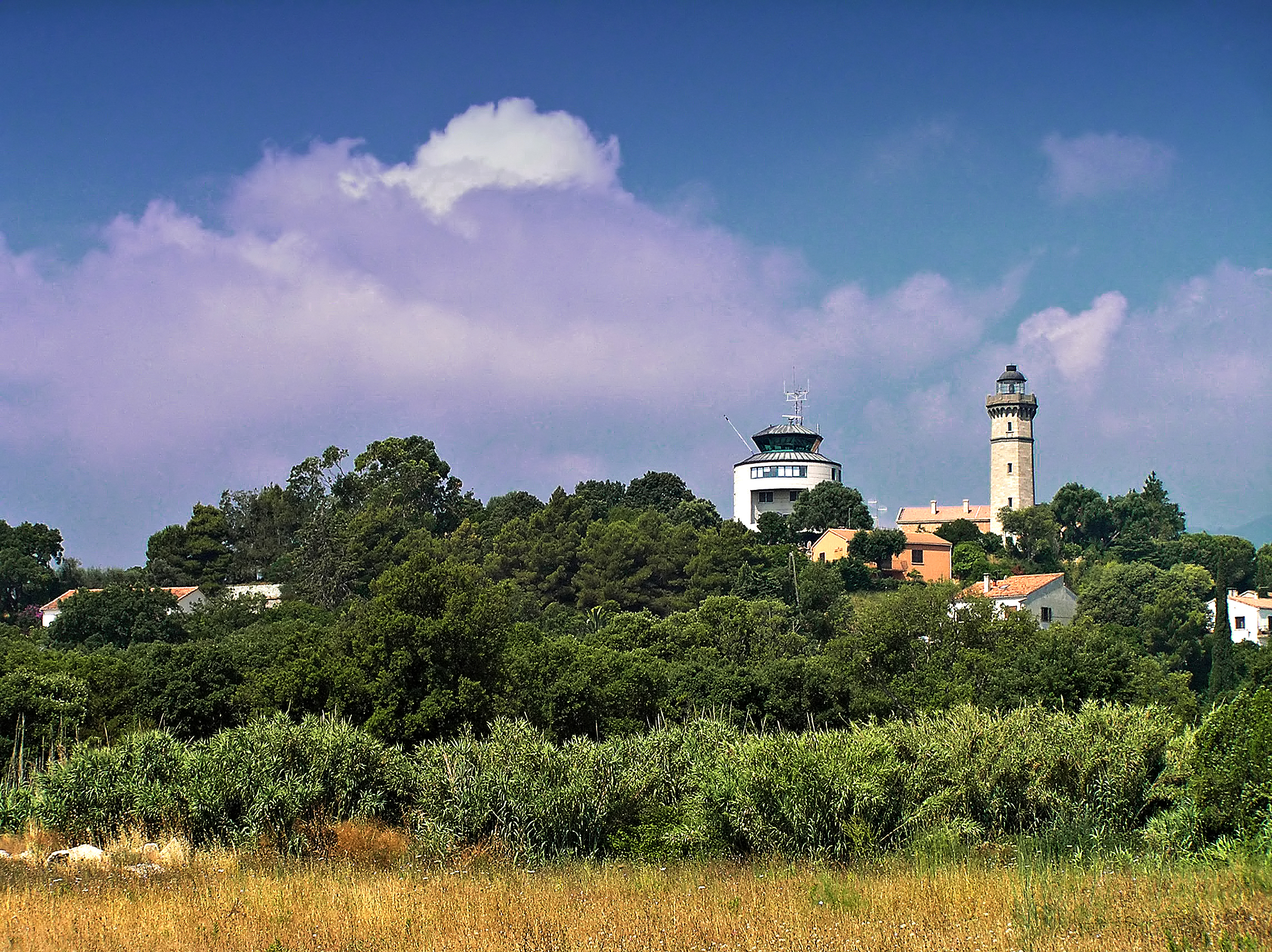
- The lighthouse of Alistro, in San-Giuliano
- Location of San-Giuliano
- Location within France Location within Corsica
- Coordinates: 42°18′55″N 9°29′29″E
- Country: France
- Region: Corsica
- Department: Haute-Corse
- Arrondissement: Corte
- Canton: Castagniccia
- Intercommunality: Costa Verde

Government
  - Mayor (2025–2026): Marie-Ange Orsini
- Area^{1}: 23.93 km^{2} (9.24 sq mi)
- Elevation: 150 m (490 ft)
- Highest elevation: 295 m (968 ft)
- Lowest elevation: 0 m (0 ft)
- Population (2023): 812
  - Density: 33.9/km^{2} (87.9/sq mi)
- Time zone: UTC+01:00 (CET)
  - Summer (DST): UTC+02:00 (CEST)
- INSEE/Postal code: 2B303 /20230
- ^{1} French Land Register data, which excludes lakes, ponds, glaciers > 1 km^{2} (0.386 sq mi or 247 acres) and river estuaries.

San-Giuliano (French form) or San Giuliano di Campoloro (Italian: [san dʒuˈljaːno di kampoˈlɔːro]; Corsican: San Ghjulianu or San Ghjulianu di Campulori; lit. 'St. Julian [of Campoloro]'), is a French commune in the Haute-Corse department, island of Corsica.

It is the easternmost town of the island.

== Population ==
Historical population
Year	Pop.	±% p.a.
1968	461	—
1975	500	+1.17%
1982	542	+1.16%
1990	593	+1.13%
1999	608	+0.28%
2007	605	−0.06%
2012	663	+1.85%
2017	726	+1.83%
2023	812	+1.88%
Source: INSEE

== See also ==
- Communes of the Haute-Corse department
- Tour de Fiorentina
