= Groupe Salins =

European salt producer

Groupe Salins Compagnie des Salins du Midi et des Salines de l'Est
- Company type: SASU (Société par actions simplifiée à associé unique)
- Industry: Salt production APE 0893Z
- Founder: Alfred Renouard
- Headquarters: 92-98 Boulevard Victor Hugo - 92115 Clichy, France
- Key people: Hubert François (CEO)
- Revenue: €144,249,000 as of June 30, 2018
- Net income: €8,738,000 as of June 30, 2018
- Total equity: €117,008,000 as of June 30, 2018
- Number of employees: 544 as of June 30, 2018 (average annual workforce)
- Parent: Finachef 754012094
- Website: www.salins.com

The Groupe Salins, whose main component is the Compagnie des Salins du Midi et des Salines de l'Est, is one of the leading salt producers in Europe. It is exclusively dedicated to the production and marketing of salt.

The group is also the only European actor to master and implement all three techniques of salt production: solar, thermal, and mining. It can supply salt in all its forms, raw or processed, for various applications, including human consumption, agriculture, chemistry, snow removal, water treatment, and other industrial activities.

The Salins Group has facilities in Spain, France, Italy, as well as several African countries. It carries out its logistical and commercial activities throughout Europe, West Africa, and North Africa. Its production capacity amounts to 4 million tons of salt per year.

The history of the Salins Group began in 1856 in Aigues-Mortes. It currently employs 1500 people, and achieves a consolidated annual turnover of €300 million.

== History ==
The group was created in 1856 in Aigues-Mortes by a group of salt pan owners, which became the company Renouard et (Alfred Renouard), before becoming a joint-stock company, the Compagnie des Salins du Midi, in 1868. The headquarters were then located in Montpellier. Adolphe d'Eichthal became its president. In 1890, salt production exceeded 80,000 tons. The saltpans of Giraud were founded around the same period by the company Péchiney.

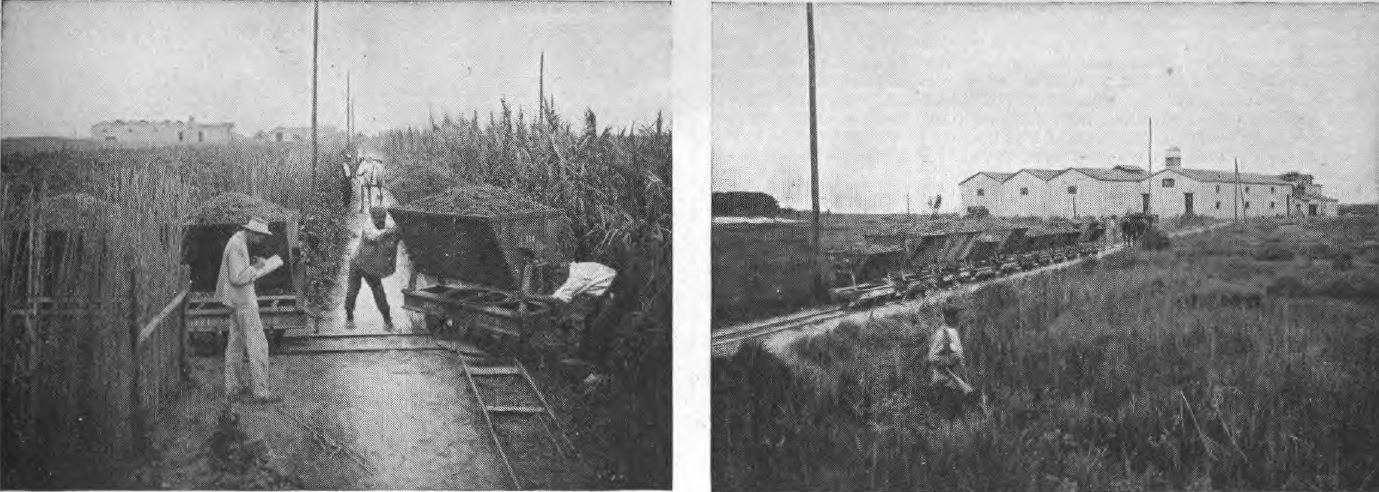
Exploitation of the vineyard of the company around 1920

In 1960, the group acquired the Société salinière de l'Ouest, the main distributor of salts from the western region, thus controlling two-thirds of the market for Guérande salts. In 1968, it merged with the Société Salinière de l'Est et du Sud-Ouest and the saltworks in Dax (Landes), giving rise to the Compagnie de Salins du Midi et des Salines de l'Est (CSME), a national-scale group.

In 2004, French investment funds Abénex, Chequers Capital, and a fund managed by Crédit Agricole (Union d'Études et Investissements) entered the capital.

In 2012, French investment funds Abénex and Chequers Capital, mandated the investment bank Lazard to of the salt group. They halted the process a few months later due to a lack of comprehensive offers.

In 2014, Hubert François became the majority shareholder through his family holding company Finachef, with the remaining capital held by another individual shareholder. The amount of the transaction was not disclosed.

== Salins in Figures ==
Headquarters in Clichy 2019 Revenue: €149,000,000 2021 Revenue: €19,137,000 Group workforce: 250 to 499 employees. The Salins Group is reported to be the largest private landowner in France, with including 25,000 in operation.
