= Plouarzel =

Plouarzel Plouarzhel
- Commune
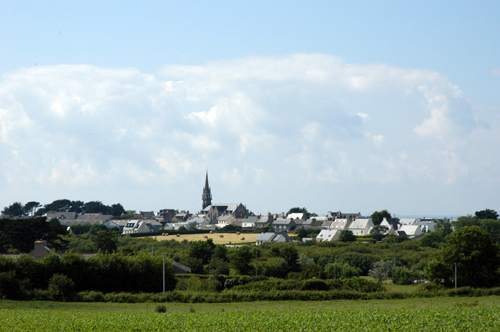
- A general view of Plouarzel

- Coat of arms
- Location of Plouarzel
- Location within France Location within Brittany
- Coordinates: 48°26′05″N 4°43′46″W
- Country: France
- Region: Brittany
- Department: Finistère
- Arrondissement: Brest
- Canton: Saint-Renan
- Intercommunality: Pays d'Iroise

Government
  - Mayor (2020–2026): André Talarmin
- Area^{1}: 42.83 km^{2} (16.54 sq mi)
- Highest elevation: 139 m (456 ft)
- Lowest elevation: 0 m (0 ft)
- Population (2023): 4,029
  - Density: 94.07/km^{2} (243.6/sq mi)
- Time zone: UTC+01:00 (CET)
  - Summer (DST): UTC+02:00 (CEST)
- INSEE/Postal code: 29177 /29810
- Website: plouarzel.fr
- ^{1} French Land Register data, which excludes lakes, ponds, glaciers > 1 km^{2} (0.386 sq mi or 247 acres) and river estuaries.

Plouarzel (French pronunciation: [pluaʁzɛl]; Breton: Plouarzhel) is a commune in the Finistère department of Brittany in north-western France.

The westernmost point of continental France, the Pointe de Corsen, lies within the commune.

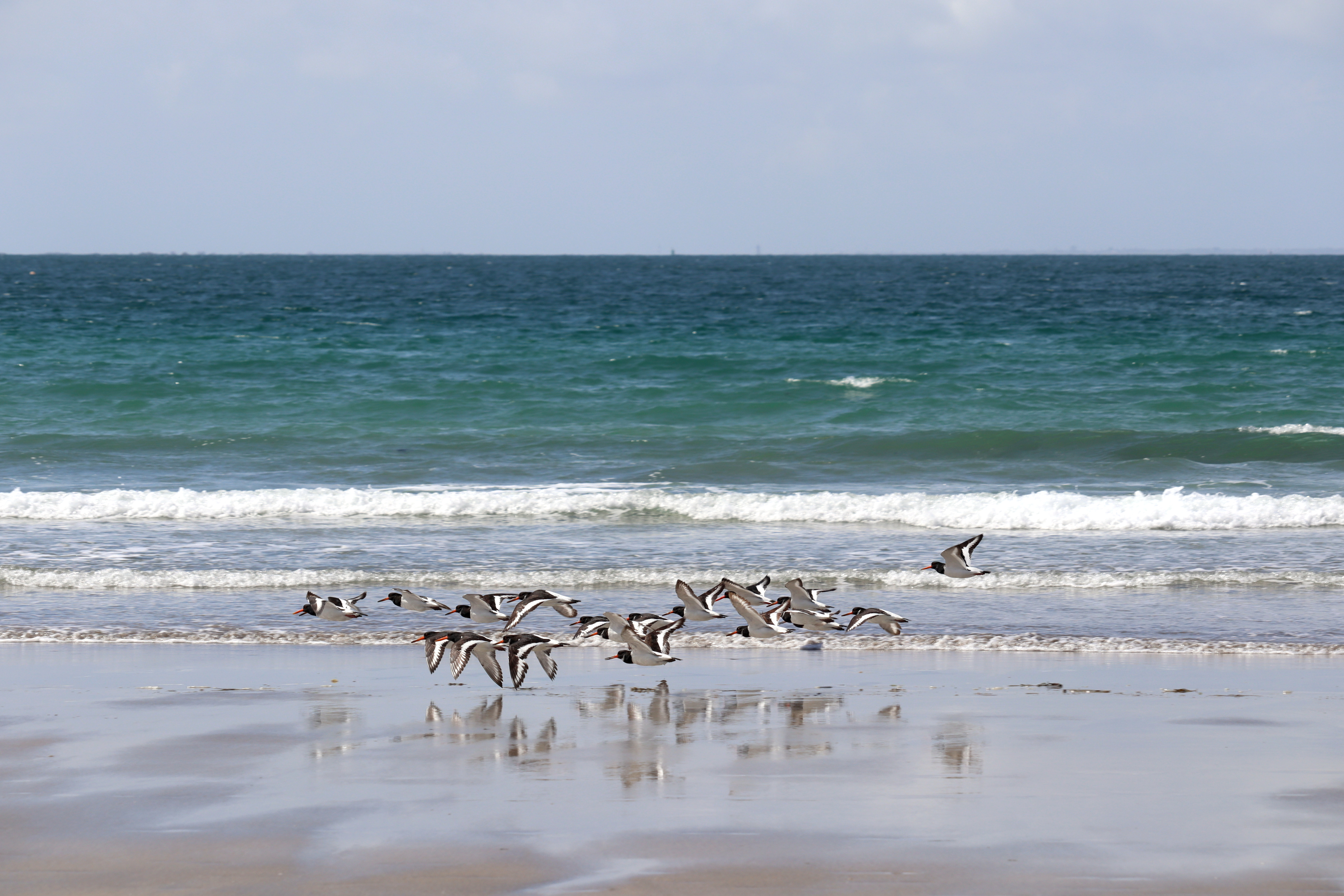
Oystercatchers

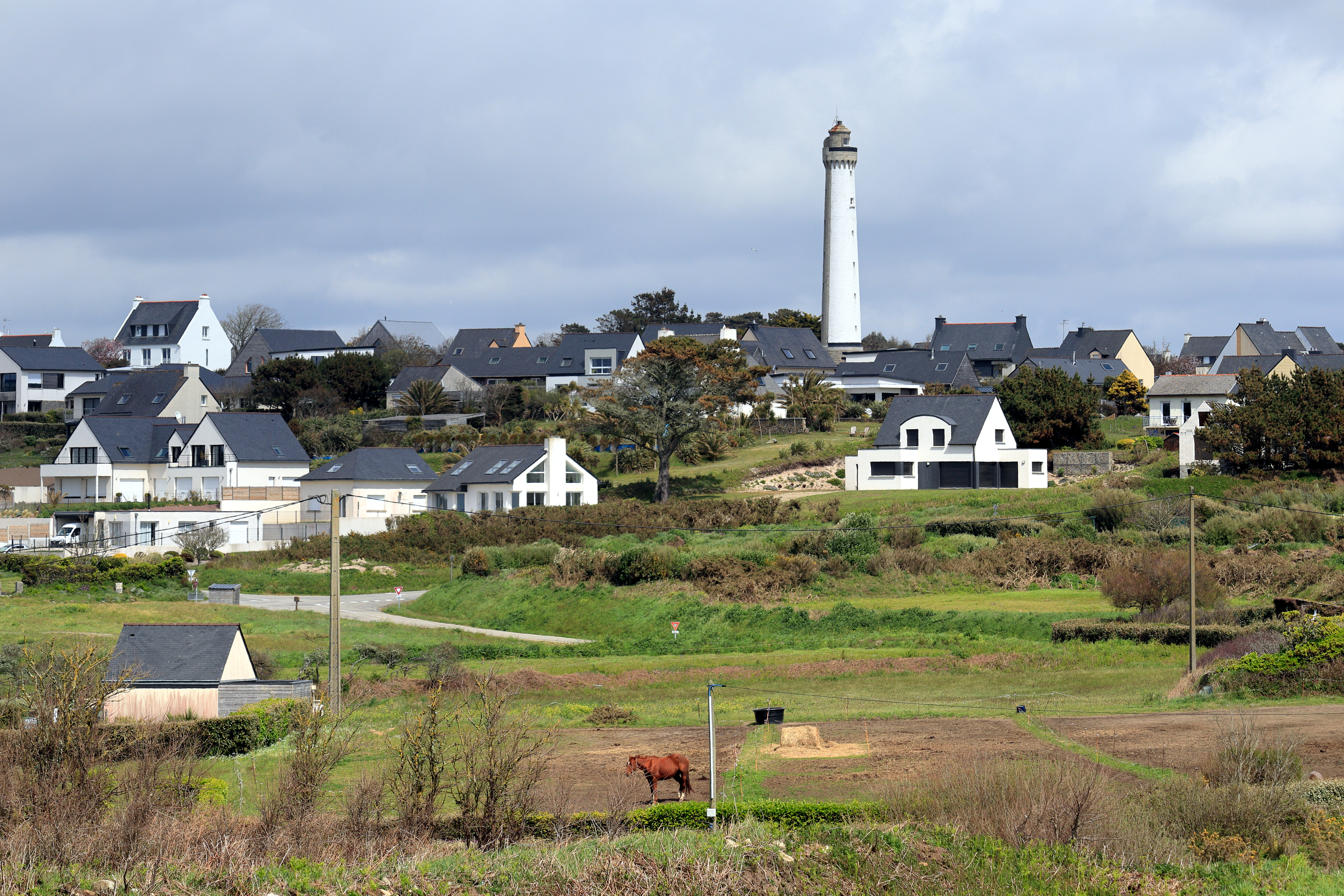
Lighthouse Trézien

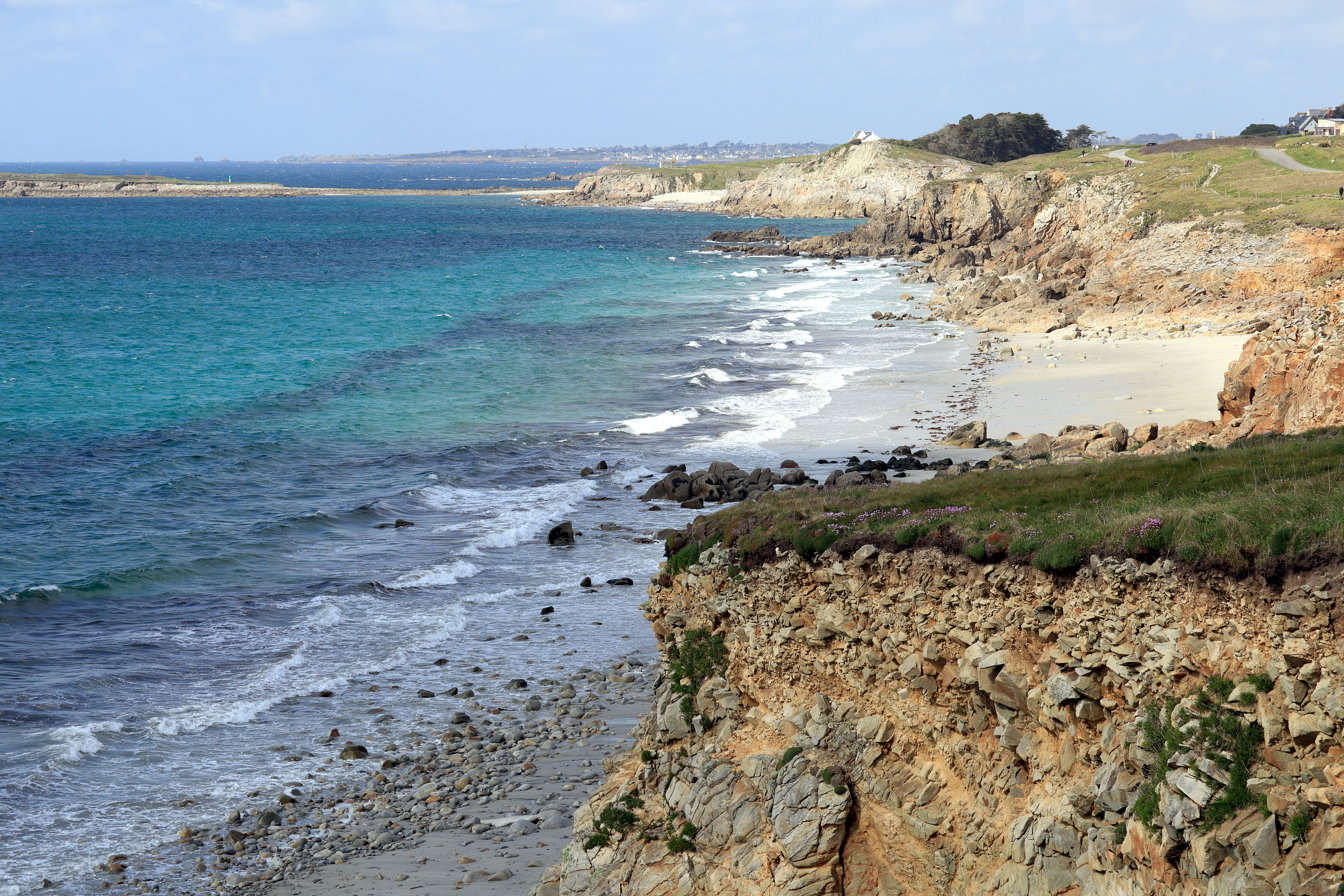
Hiking trail

== Population ==
Inhabitants of Plouarzel are called in French Plouarzélistes.

Historical population
Year	Pop.	±% p.a.
1968	1,915	—
1975	1,886	−0.22%
1982	2,003	+0.86%
1990	2,042	+0.24%
1999	2,458	+2.08%
2007	3,278	+3.66%
2012	3,723	+2.58%
2017	3,715	−0.04%
2023	4,029	+1.36%
Source: INSEE

== Breton language ==
The municipality launched a linguistic plan concerning the Breton language through Ya d'ar brezhoneg on 4 July 2005. In 2008, 9.71% of primary-school children attended bilingual schools.

== See also ==
- Communes of the Finistère department
