= Istres =

Subprefecture of Bouches-du-Rhône, Provence-Alpes-Côte d'Azur, France

- Subprefecture and commune
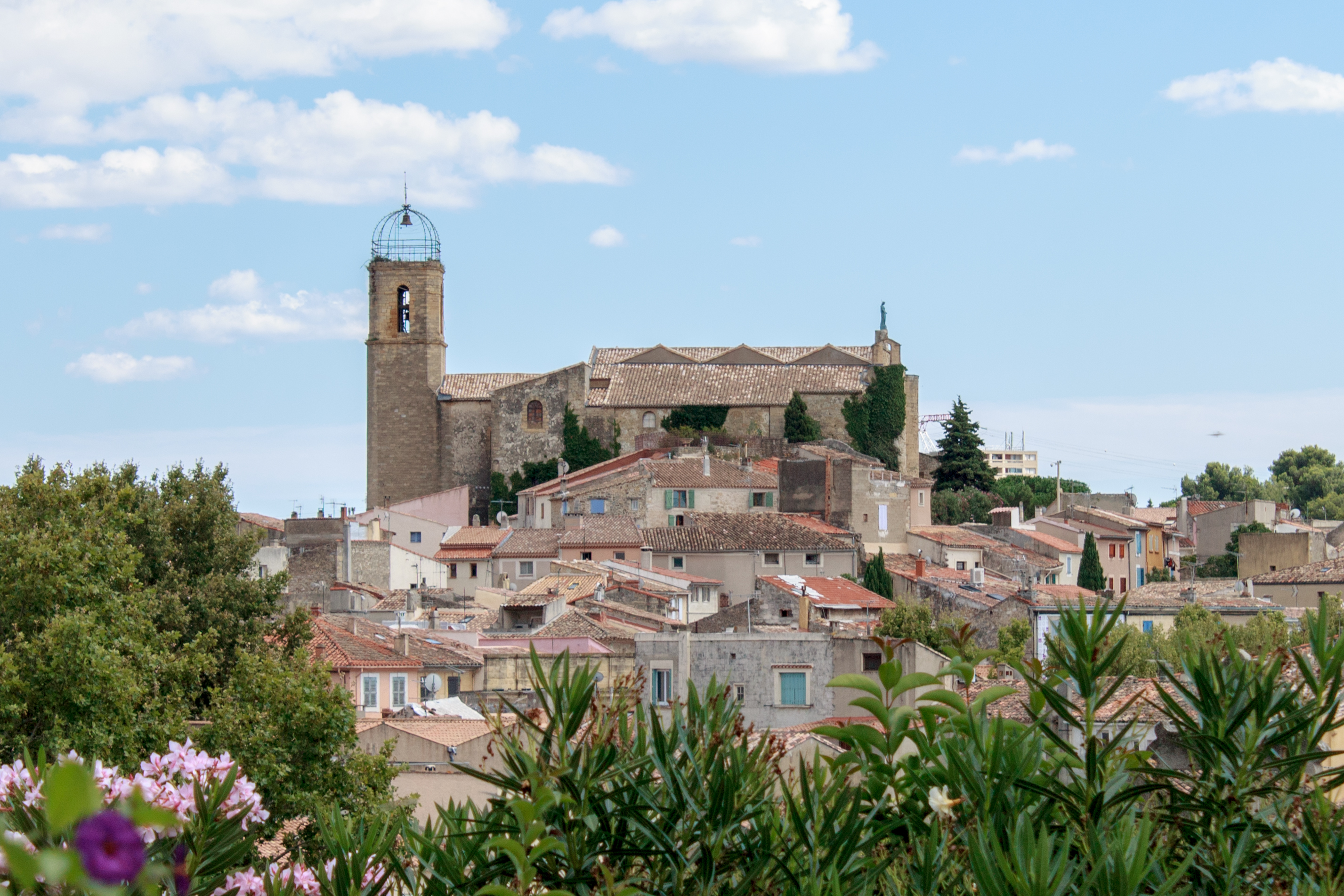
- Historic center

- Coat of arms
- Location of Istres
- Location within France Location within Provence-Alpes-Côte d'Azur
- Coordinates: 43°30′54″N 4°59′22″E
- Country: France
- Region: Provence-Alpes-Côte d'Azur
- Department: Bouches-du-Rhône
- Arrondissement: Istres
- Canton: Istres
- Intercommunality: Aix-Marseille-Provence

Government
  - Mayor (2026–32): Robin Prétot
- Area^{1}: 113.73 km^{2} (43.91 sq mi)
- Elevation: 20 m (66 ft)
- Highest elevation: 120 m (390 ft)
- Lowest elevation: 0 m (0 ft)
- Population (2023): 44,292
  - Density: 389.45/km^{2} (1,008.7/sq mi)
- Time zone: UTC+01:00 (CET)
  - Summer (DST): UTC+02:00 (CEST)
- INSEE/Postal code: 13047 /13800
- ^{1} French Land Register data, which excludes lakes, ponds, glaciers > 1 km^{2} (0.386 sq mi or 247 acres) and river estuaries.

Istres (French pronunciation: [istʁ]; Occitan: Istre) is a commune in southern France, some 60 km (38 mi) northwest of Marseille. It is in the Provence-Alpes-Côte d'Azur region, in the Bouches-du-Rhône department, of which it is a subprefecture.

== Location ==
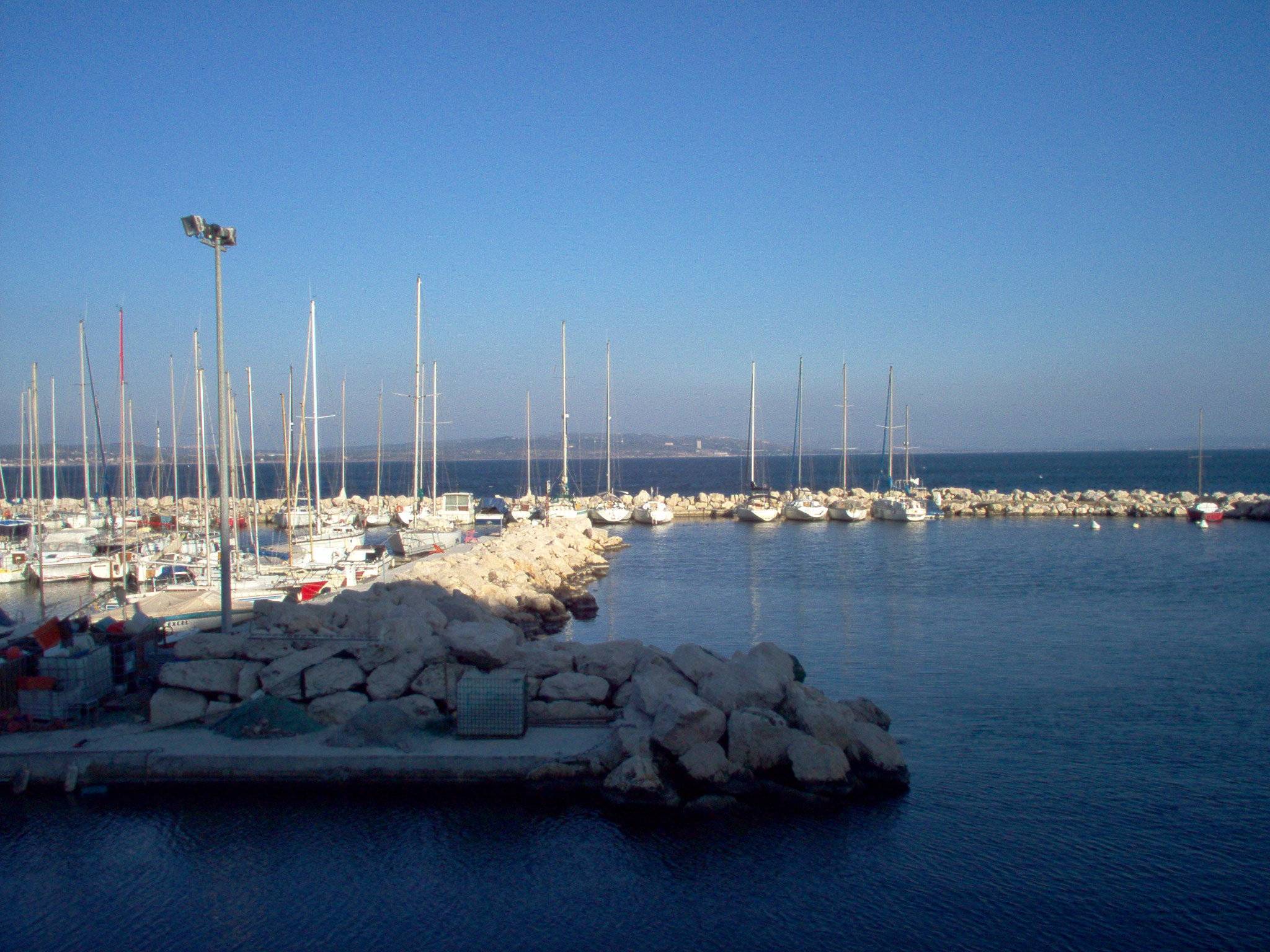
Istres Harbour

Istres is adjacent to the Étang de Berre lagoon (the largest in Europe) and the Étang de l'Olivier lagoon. It is located some 60 km (38 mi) north-west of Marseille, 20 km (13 mi) south-west of Salon-de-Provence, 10 km (6 mi) north of Martigues and 45 km (28 mi) south-east of Arles. Istres is also adjacent to the plaine de la Crau and the Camargue national park.

== Sports ==
The city has numerous sports facilities and exactly 102 clubs. Each year, a race is organized around the Étang de l'Olivier. Many runners participate. The town's main football club is FC Istres.

== Facilities ==
Istres is the home of the Istres-Le Tubé Air Base (BA 125). This air base was one of three utilized by NASA as a contingency landing site for the Space Shuttle in the case of a Transoceanic Abort Landing. Istres shared this responsibility with Zaragoza, Spain and Moron, Spain.

== Climate ==
Istres has a Mediterranean climate characterised by mild, humid winters and hot, dry summers. January and February are the coldest months, averaging temperatures of around 7 °C (45 °F). July and August are the hottest months. The mean summer temperature is around 24 °C (75 °F) with an average maximum temperature of around 32 °C (90 °F). The amount of precipitation is around 566 mm (22 inches) per year. The mistral, a cold and often violent wind, blows through the city mostly in winter and spring.

Climate data for Istres (1981–2010 averages, extremes 1920–present)
Month	Jan	Feb	Mar	Apr	May	Jun	Jul	Aug	Sep	Oct	Nov	Dec	Year
Record high °C (°F)	21.0 (69.8)	23.3 (73.9)	26.0 (78.8)	29.8 (85.6)	34.5 (94.1)	44.3 (111.7)	39.5 (103.1)	39.8 (103.6)	34.9 (94.8)	30.9 (87.6)	25.2 (77.4)	20.3 (68.5)	44.3 (111.7)
Mean daily maximum °C (°F)	11.2 (52.2)	12.4 (54.3)	15.6 (60.1)	18.3 (64.9)	22.5 (72.5)	27.1 (80.8)	30.2 (86.4)	29.8 (85.6)	25.4 (77.7)	20.6 (69.1)	14.8 (58.6)	11.6 (52.9)	20.0 (68.0)
Daily mean °C (°F)	7.0 (44.6)	7.8 (46.0)	10.7 (51.3)	13.3 (55.9)	17.4 (63.3)	21.5 (70.7)	24.6 (76.3)	24.2 (75.6)	20.3 (68.5)	16.3 (61.3)	10.8 (51.4)	7.7 (45.9)	15.2 (59.4)
Mean daily minimum °C (°F)	2.8 (37.0)	3.2 (37.8)	5.7 (42.3)	8.3 (46.9)	12.2 (54.0)	16.0 (60.8)	18.9 (66.0)	18.6 (65.5)	15.3 (59.5)	11.9 (53.4)	6.9 (44.4)	3.8 (38.8)	10.3 (50.5)
Record low °C (°F)	−11.1 (12.0)	−13.6 (7.5)	−7.2 (19.0)	−1.4 (29.5)	3.1 (37.6)	6.7 (44.1)	9.0 (48.2)	9.6 (49.3)	5.1 (41.2)	−2.0 (28.4)	−4.9 (23.2)	−12.6 (9.3)	−13.6 (7.5)
Average precipitation mm (inches)	53.9 (2.12)	36.2 (1.43)	33.9 (1.33)	53.1 (2.09)	42.2 (1.66)	25.7 (1.01)	10.2 (0.40)	26.5 (1.04)	76.8 (3.02)	84.8 (3.34)	60.2 (2.37)	50.8 (2.00)	554.3 (21.82)
Average precipitation days (≥ 1.0 mm)	5.2	4.3	4.2	5.9	4.7	3.3	1.4	2.6	4.3	6.1	6.1	5.5	53.5
Average snowy days	0.8	0.8	0.3	0.0	0.0	0.0	0.0	0.0	0.0	0.0	0.1	0.8	2.8
Average relative humidity (%)	74	71	67	65	65	63	59	62	69	73	73	75	68
Source 1: Meteo France
Source 2: Infoclimat.fr (humidity and snowy days 1961–1990)

== Population ==
Historical population

Year	Pop.	±% p.a.
1793	2,081	—
1800	2,081	+0.00%
1806	1,991	−0.73%
1821	2,785	+2.26%
1831	3,023	+0.82%
1836	3,036	+0.09%
1841	3,122	+0.56%
1846	3,268	+0.92%
1851	3,389	+0.73%
1856	3,614	+1.29%
1861	3,776	+0.88%
1866	3,905	+0.67%
1872	3,937	+0.14%
1876	3,849	−0.56%
1881	3,701	−0.78%
1886	3,750	+0.26%
1891	3,405	−1.91%
1896	3,495	+0.52%
1901	3,517	+0.13%

Year	Pop.	±% p.a.
1906	3,681	+0.92%
1911	3,810	+0.69%
1921	5,462	+3.67%
1926	5,547	+0.31%
1931	7,034	+4.86%
1936	7,286	+0.71%
1946	5,749	−2.34%
1954	8,009	+4.23%
1962	9,478	+2.13%
1968	13,404	+5.95%
1975	18,129	+4.41%
1982	28,561	+6.71%
1990	35,163	+2.63%
1999	38,855	+1.12%
2007	42,775	+1.21%
2012	42,944	+0.08%
2017	43,133	+0.09%
2023	44,292	+0.44%

Source: EHESS and INSEE (1968-2023)

== See also ==
- Communes of the Bouches-du-Rhône department
- FC Istres
