= Saint-Mitre-les-Remparts =

Commune in Provence-Alpes-Côte d'Azur, France

- Commune
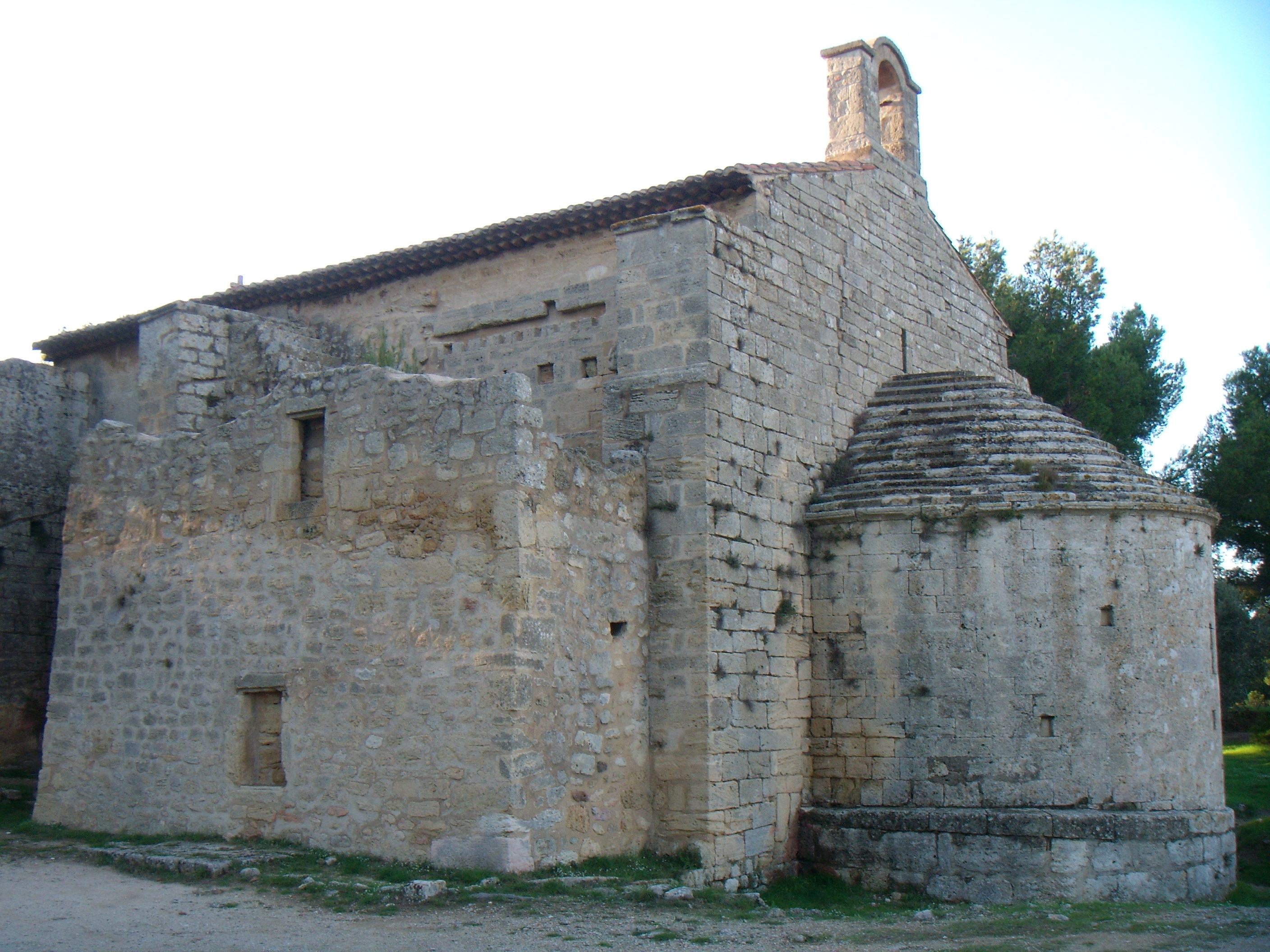
- The chapel of Saint-Blaise, in Saint-Mitre-les-Remparts

- Coat of arms
- Location of Saint-Mitre-les-Remparts
- Location within France Location within Provence-Alpes-Côte d'Azur
- Coordinates: 43°27′21″N 5°00′54″E
- Country: France
- Region: Provence-Alpes-Côte d'Azur
- Department: Bouches-du-Rhône
- Arrondissement: Istres
- Canton: Istres
- Intercommunality: Aix-Marseille-Provence

Government
  - Mayor (2026–32): Vincent Goyet
- Area^{1}: 21.02 km^{2} (8.12 sq mi)
- Elevation: 85 m (279 ft)
- Highest elevation: 141 m (463 ft)
- Lowest elevation: 0 m (0 ft)
- Population (2023): 6,175
  - Density: 293.8/km^{2} (760.9/sq mi)
- Time zone: UTC+01:00 (CET)
  - Summer (DST): UTC+02:00 (CEST)
- INSEE/Postal code: 13098 /13920
- ^{1} French Land Register data, which excludes lakes, ponds, glaciers > 1 km^{2} (0.386 sq mi or 247 acres) and river estuaries.

Saint-Mitre-les-Remparts (French pronunciation: [sɛ̃ mitʁ le ʁɑ̃paʁ]; Occitan: Sant Mitre dei Barris, before 1949: Saint-Mitre) is a commune in the Bouches-du-Rhône department in southern France.

== Population ==
Historical population

Year	Pop.	±% p.a.
1793	988	—
1800	883	−1.59%
1806	922	+0.72%
1821	1,101	+1.19%
1831	1,145	+0.39%
1836	1,206	+1.04%
1841	1,224	+0.30%
1846	1,051	−3.00%
1851	1,089	+0.71%
1856	1,044	−0.84%
1861	1,112	+1.27%
1866	1,055	−1.05%
1872	984	−1.15%
1876	940	−1.14%
1881	898	−0.91%
1886	712	−4.54%
1891	514	−6.31%
1896	489	−0.99%
1901	499	+0.41%

Year	Pop.	±% p.a.
1906	435	−2.71%
1911	457	+0.99%
1921	412	−1.03%
1926	423	+0.53%
1931	405	−0.87%
1936	430	+1.21%
1946	405	−0.60%
1954	667	+6.43%
1962	1,029	+5.57%
1968	1,411	+5.40%
1975	3,327	+13.04%
1982	4,297	+3.72%
1990	5,139	+2.26%
1999	5,458	+0.67%
2007	5,367	−0.21%
2012	5,721	+1.29%
2017	5,837	+0.40%
2023	6,175	+0.94%

Source: EHESS and INSEE (1968-2023)

== See also ==
- Étang de Berre
- Communes of the Bouches-du-Rhône department
