= 2003–04 Olympique de Marseille season =

Marseille
2003–04 season
- Chairman: Robert Louis-Dreyfus
- Manager: Alain Perrin; José Anigo
- Ligue 1: 7th
- Coupe de France: Round of 32
- Coupe de la Ligue: Round of 16
- Champions League: Group stage
- UEFA Cup: Runners-up
- Top goalscorer: League: Didier Drogba (19); All: Didier Drogba (32)
Home colours	Away colours	Third colours

Olympique de Marseille returned to the UEFA Champions League for the first time in four years, and in spite of going out in the group stage, the side made headlines in the UEFA Cup, knocking Liverpool, Internazionale and Newcastle United out on the way to the final, where the sending off of goalkeeper Fabien Barthez and the converted penalty kick from Valencia's Vicente saw Valencia eventually edge the game.

In the domestic campaign, Marseille endured a disappointing campaign, where manager Alain Perrin was replaced by José Anigo early on, following the inability to hang onto the top teams. The end result was seventh, missing out even on UEFA Cup qualification, in spite of having the French player of the season in Didier Drogba in the team. The Ivorian striker netted 19 league goals and was instrumental to OM's fortunes in Europe, and following the season he was sold to Chelsea.

== Squad ==
Note: Flags indicate national team as defined under FIFA eligibility rules; some limited exceptions apply. Players may hold more than one non-FIFA nationality.

No.	Pos.	Nation	Player
1	GK	(Croatia) CRO	Vedran Runje
3	DF	(France) FRA	Manuel dos Santos
4	MF	(France) FRA	Mathieu Flamini
5	DF	(France) FRA	Philippe Christanval
6	MF	(Algeria) ALG	Brahim Hemdani
7	MF	(Senegal) SEN	Sylvain N'Diaye
8	MF	(France) FRA	Sébastien Pérez
9	FW	(Egypt) EGY	Mido
10	FW	(Spain) ESP	Koke
11	FW	(Ivory Coast) CIV	Didier Drogba
12	DF	(Ivory Coast) CIV	Abdoulaye Méïté
14	MF	(Czech Republic) CZE	Štěpán Vachoušek
15	MF	(France) FRA	Pascal Johansen
16	GK	(France) FRA	Fabien Barthez (on loan from Manchester United)
18	MF	(France) FRA	Camel Meriem (on loan from Bordeaux)
19	MF	(Czech Republic) CZE	Rudi Skácel

No.	Pos.	Nation	Player
20	FW	(France) FRA	Steve Marlet (on loan from Fulham)
21	DF	(France) FRA	Johnny Ecker
23	DF	(Senegal) SEN	Habib Beye
24	FW	(France) FRA	Karim Dahou
25	DF	(Brazil) BRA	Demetrius Ferreira (on loan from Bastia)
26	MF	(France) FRA	Laurent Batlles
27	DF	(France) FRA	Camille Borios
28	DF	(France) FRA	David Sommeil (on loan from Manchester City)
29	DF	(Switzerland) SUI	Fabio Celestini
30	GK	(France) FRA	Jérémy Gavanon
32	MF	(France) FRA	Laurent Merlin
36	FW	(Senegal) SEN	Rahmane Barry
—	GK	(France) FRA	Cédric Carrasso
—	MF	(Portugal) POR	Delfim
—	FW	(France) FRA	Nicolas Cicut

=== Left club during season ===
Note: Flags indicate national team as defined under FIFA eligibility rules; some limited exceptions apply. Players may hold more than one non-FIFA nationality.

No.	Pos.	Nation	Player
4	DF	(Belgium) BEL	Daniel Van Buyten (on loan to Manchester City)
7	MF	(Poland) POL	Piotr Świerczewski (to Lech Poznań)
10	FW	(Brazil) BRA	Fernandão (on loan to Toulouse)
13	FW	(Senegal) SEN	Lamine Sakho (on loan to Leeds United)

No.	Pos.	Nation	Player
19	FW	(Ivory Coast) CIV	Ibrahima Bakayoko (to Osasuna)
20	MF	(Cameroon) CMR	Salomon Olembe (on loan to Leeds United)
22	FW	(Russia) RUS	Dmitri Sytchev (to Lokomotiv Moscow)
25	DF	(France) FRA	Fabien Laurenti (on loan to Ajaccio)

== Competitions ==
=== Ligue 1 ===
==== League table ====
Pos	Team	Pld	W	D	L	GF	GA	GD	Pts	Qualification or relegation
5	Sochaux	38	18	9	11	54	42	+12	63	Qualification to UEFA Cup first round
6	Nantes	38	17	9	12	47	35	+12	60	Qualification to Intertoto Cup third round
7	Marseille	38	17	6	15	51	45	+6	57	
8	Lens	38	15	8	15	34	48	−14	53	
9	Rennes	38	14	10	14	56	44	+12	52	

Source: Ligue 1
Rules for classification: 1) points; 2) goal difference; 3) number of goals scored.

==== Results summary ====
Overall								Home						Away					
Pld	W	D	L	GF	GA	GD	Pts	W	D	L	GF	GA	GD	W	D	L	GF	GA	GD
38	17	6	15	51	45	+6	57	12	3	4	34	18	+16	5	3	11	17	27	−10

Source: LFP.fr

==== Results by round ====
Round	1	2	3	4	5	6	7	8	9	10	11	12	13	14	15	16	17	18	19	20	21	22	23	24	25	26	27	28	29	30	31	32	33	34	35	36	37	38
Ground	A	H	A	H	A	H	A	H	H	A	H	A	H	A	H	A	H	H	A	H	A	A	H	A	H	A	A	H	A	H	A	H	A	H	A	H	A	H
Result	W	W	L	W	W	W	L	W	W	L	W	L	L	W	L	D	L	W	L	W	L	W	W	D	D	D	L	W	L	D	W	W	L	L	L	D	L	W
Position	4	2	6	4	2	1	2	2	2	2	2	3	3	3	3	5	7	7	6	6	6	7	6	6	6	6	6	6	6	6	6	6	6	7	7	7	7	7

Source: LFP.fr
A = Away; H = Home; W = Win; D = Draw; L = Loss

==== Matches ====
2 August 2003 1	Guingamp	0–1	Marseille	Guingamp
20:00			Bakayoko 90+1'	Stadium: Stade de Roudourou; Attendance: 18,002; Referee: Damien Ledentu

8 August 2003 2	Marseille	1–0	Auxerre	Marseille
20:45	Mido 58'			Stadium: Stade Vélodrome; Attendance: 55,840; Referee: Alain Sars

17 August 2003 3	Lens	2–1	Marseille	Lens
20:45	Diop 21'; Thomert 90+1'		Drogba 11'	Stadium: Stade Félix-Bollaert; Attendance: 40,445; Referee: Philippe Kalt

23 August 2003 4	Marseille	2–0	Sochaux	Marseille
20:00	Drogba 34'; Hemdani 84' (pen.)			Stadium: Stade Vélodrome; Attendance: 55,782; Referee: Gilles Veissière

31 August 2003 5	Ajaccio	0–1	Marseille	Ajaccio
20:45			Meriem 65'	Stadium: Stade François Coty; Attendance: 8,204; Referee: Pascal Garibian

13 September 2003 6	Marseille	5–0	Le Mans	Marseille
20:00	Drogba 14'; Marlet 24'; Mido 55', 86'; Sychev 68'			Stadium: Stade Vélodrome; Attendance: 51,975; Referee: Dominique Fraise

21 September 2003 7	Nantes	1–0	Marseille	Nantes
20:45	Vahirua 3'			Stadium: Stade de la Beaujoire; Attendance: 35,862; Referee: Laurent Duhamel

27 September 2003 8	Marseille	2–1	Nice	Marseille
20:00	Drogba 59', 90+4' (pen.)		Laslandes 35'	Stadium: Stade Vélodrome; Attendance: 50,148; Referee: Pascal Viléo

5 October 2003 9	Marseille	3–1	Bastia	Marseille
20:45	Drogba 15'; Marlet 19'; Skácel 67'			Stadium: Stade Vélodrome; Attendance: 50,148; Referee: Bruno Derrien

17 October 2003 10	Strasbourg	4–1	Marseille	Strasbourg
21:00	Martins 21'; Niang 37'; Ljuboja 45+1'; Ehret 90'		Marlet 33'	Stadium: Stade de la Meinau; Attendance: 26,943; Referee: Alain Sars

25 October 2003 11	Marseille	2–0	Rennes	Marseille
20:00	Van Buyten 45'; Drogba 76'			Stadium: Stade Vélodrome; Attendance: 52,112; Referee: Claude Colombo

1 November 2003 12	Bordeaux	1–0	Marseille	Bordeaux
20:00	Darcheville 45'			Stadium: Stade Chaban-Delmas; Attendance: 32,507; Referee: Laurent Duhamel

9 November 2003 13	Marseille	1–4	Lyon	Marseille
21:00	Van Buyten 20'		Élber 19'; Luyindula 38', 58'; Juninho 90+2'	Stadium: Stade Vélodrome; Attendance: 56,207; Referee: Bertrand Layec

22 November 2003 14	Lille	0–2	Marseille	Lille
20:00			Drogba 22'; Mido 47'	Stadium: Stade Grimonprez-Jooris; Attendance: 20,480; Referee: Pascal Garibian

30 November 2003 15	Marseille	0–1	Paris Saint-Germain	Marseille
20:45			Fiorèse 90'	Stadium: Stade Vélodrome; Attendance: 55,493; Referee: Alain Sars

5 December 2003 17	Marseille	1–2	Monaco	Marseille
21:00	Mido 44'		Squillaci 59'; Giuly 67'	Stadium: Stade Vélodrome; Attendance: 52,265; Referee: Éric Poulat

20 December 2003 19	Marseille	1–0	Toulouse	Marseille
17:15	Drogba 62'			Stadium: Stade Vélodrome; Attendance: 50,838; Referee: Stéphane Lannoy

10 January 2004 20	Auxerre	2–0	Marseille	Auxerre
20:00	Tainio 4'; Kalou 16'			Stadium: Stade de l'Abbé-Deschamps; Attendance: 21,112; Referee: Laurent Duhamel

18 January 2004 21	Marseille	3–2	Lens	Marseille
20:45	Drogba 10', 48'; Sychev 88'		Moreira 13'; Thomert 62'	Stadium: Stade Vélodrome; Attendance: 48,638; Referee: Pascal Garibian

27 January 2004 16	Metz	1–1	Marseille	Metz
20:45	Rodriguez 47'		Drogba 77'	Stadium: Stade Saint-Symphorien; Attendance: 28,511; Referee: Philippe Kalt

31 January 2004 22	Sochaux	2–1	Marseille	Montbéliard
20:00	Mathieu 31'; Frau 74' (pen.)		Gnanhouan 6' (o.g.)	Stadium: Stade Auguste Bonal; Attendance: 19,754; Referee: Stéphane Bré

4 February 2004 18	Montpellier	0–1	Marseille	Montpellier
19:00			Drogba 64'	Stadium: Stade de la Mosson; Attendance: 21,085; Referee: Claude Colombo

7 February 2004 23	Marseille	2–1	Ajaccio	Marseille
17:16	Mido 11'; Marlet 90+1'		Seck 73'	Stadium: Stade Vélodrome; Attendance: 48,698; Referee: Stéphane Moulin

14 February 2004 24	Le Mans	0–0	Marseille	Le Mans
20:00				Stadium: Stade Léon-Bollée; Attendance: 16,312; Referee: Gilles Veissière

22 February 2004 25	Marseille	1–1	Nantes	Marseille
20:45	Drogba 29'		Moldovan 41'	Stadium: Stade Vélodrome; Attendance: 49,637; Referee: Pascal Viléo

29 February 2004 26	Nice	0–0	Marseille	Nice
18:00				Stadium: Stade du Ray; Attendance: 15,686; Referee: Damien Ledentu

7 March 2004 27	Bastia	4–1	Marseille	Furiani
20:45	Maurice 22'; Diarra 27'; Ben Saada 49'; Ogbeche 65'		Drogba 79' (pen.)	Stadium: Stade Armand Cesari; Attendance: 6,803; Referee: Bertrand Layec

14 March 2004 28	Marseille	4–0	Strasbourg	Marseille
18:00	Drogba 22' (pen.); Marlet 37'; Ferreira 47', 90+3'			Stadium: Stade Vélodrome; Attendance: 47,893; Referee: Stéphane Lannoy

21 March 2004 29	Rennes	4–3	Marseille	Rennes
20:45	Frei 35', 39', 60', 74'		Batlles 31'; Drogba 45'; Mido 72'	Stadium: Stade de la Route de Lorient; Attendance: 18,244; Referee: Hervé Piccirillo

28 March 2004 30	Marseille	1–1	Bordeaux	Marseille
18:30	Meriem 52'		Francia 9'	Stadium: Stade Vélodrome; Attendance: 51,573; Referee: Philippe Kalt

3 April 2004 31	Lyon	1–2	Marseille	Lyon
17:15	Luyindula 17'		Drogba 4'; Meriem 84'	Stadium: Stade de Gerland; Attendance: 38,602; Referee: Laurent Duhamel

18 April 2004 32	Marseille	2–1	Lille	Marseille
18:00	Marlet 45+3'; Batlles 81'		Bodmer 12'	Stadium: Stade Vélodrome; Attendance: 50,832; Referee: Gilles Veissière

25 April 2004 33	Paris Saint-Germain	2–1	Marseille	Paris
18:15	Pauleta 12', 62'		Batlles 90+1'	Stadium: Parc des Princes; Attendance: 41,978; Referee: Stéphane Bré

1 May 2004 34	Marseille	0–1	Metz	Marseille
17:15			Meniri 26'	Stadium: Stade Vélodrome; Attendance: 52,128; Referee: Olivier Thual

9 May 2004 35	Monaco	1–0	Marseille	Monaco
20:45	Giuly 90+3'			Stadium: Stade Louis II; Attendance: 16,560; Referee: Laurent Duhamel

12 May 2004 36	Marseille	1–1	Montpellier	Marseille
20:30	Marlet 30'		Mansaré 66'	Stadium: Stade Vélodrome; Attendance: 48,709; Referee: Bertrand Layec

15 May 2004 37	Toulouse	2–1	Marseille	Toulouse
20:00	Fernandão 44' (pen.); Eduardo 85'		Dao 3' (o.g.)	Stadium: Stadium de Toulouse; Attendance: 35,005; Referee: Damien Ledentu

23 May 2004 38	Marseille	2–1	Guingamp	Marseille
20:00	Marlet 13', 41'		Talhaoui 76'	Stadium: Stade Vélodrome; Attendance: 50,968; Referee: Éric Poulat

=== Coupe de France ===
3 January 2004 Round of 64	Marseille	1–1 (a.e.t.) (4–3 p)	Strasbourg	Marseille
17:00	Ecker 37'		Niang 83'	Stadium: Stade Vélodrome; Attendance: 30,000; Referee: Damien Ledentu
	Penalties
	Mido (penalty scored); Hemdani (penalty scored); Skacel (penalty scored); Barthez (penalty scored)		(penalty scored) Kobylík; (penalty scored) Deroff; (penalty scored) Arrache

24 January 2004 Round of 32	Marseille	1–2 (a.e.t.)	Paris Saint-Germain	Marseille
17:00	Drogba 35'		Pauleta 10'; Sorín 103'	Stadium: Stade Vélodrome; Attendance: 53,000; Referee: Éric Poulat

=== Coupe de la Ligue ===
29 October 2003 Second round	Marseille	2–0	Monaco	Marseille
21:00	Fernandão 29'; Drogba 33'			Stadium: Stade Vélodrome; Attendance: 33,974; Referee: Stéphane Bre

17 December 2003 Round of 16	Sochaux	1–0	Marseille	Montbéliard
21:00	Mathieu 43'			Stadium: Stade Auguste Bonal; Attendance: 19,510; Referee: Bertrand Layec

=== UEFA Champions League ===
==== Third qualifying round ====
13 August 2003 First leg	Austria Wien	0–1	(France) Marseille	Vienna, Austria
20:30		Report	Sychev 4'	Stadium: Ernst-Happel-Stadion; Attendance: 28,300; Referee: Luis Medina Cantalejo (Spain)

27 August 2003 Second leg	Marseille (France)	0–0 (1–0 agg.)	Austria Wien	Marseille, France
20:50		Report		Stadium: Stade Vélodrome; Attendance: 41,253; Referee: Anders Frisk (Sweden)

==== Group stage ====
Pos	Team	Pld	W	D	L	GF	GA	GD	Pts	Qualification
1	(Spain) Real Madrid	6	4	2	0	11	5	+6	14	Advance to knockout stage
2	(Portugal) Porto	6	3	2	1	9	8	+1	11	Advance to knockout stage
3	(France) Marseille	6	1	1	4	9	11	−2	4	Transfer to UEFA Cup
4	(Serbia and Montenegro) Partizan	6	0	3	3	3	8	−5	3	

Source: RSSSF

16 September 2003 1	Real Madrid (Spain)	4–2	(France) Marseille	Madrid, Spain
20:45	Roberto Carlos 29'; Ronaldo 34', 56'; Figo 61' (pen.)		Drogba 25'; Van Buyten 83'	Stadium: Santiago Bernabéu Stadium; Attendance: 60,433; Referee: Wolfgang Stark (Germany)

1 October 2003 2	Marseille (France)	3–0	(Serbia and Montenegro) Partizan	Marseille, France
20:45	Drogba 62', 68', 85'			Stadium: Stade Vélodrome; Attendance: 54,362; Referee: Domenico Messina (Italy)

22 October 2003 3	Marseille (France)	2–3	(Portugal) Porto	Marseille, France
20:45	Drogba 24'; Marlet 82'		Maniche 31'; Derlei 36'; Alenichev 80'	Stadium: Stade Vélodrome; Attendance: 55,209; Referee: Kyros Vassaras (Greece)

4 November 2003 4	Porto (Portugal)	1–0	(France) Marseille	Porto, Portugal
20:45	Alenichev 80'			Stadium: Estádio das Antas; Attendance: 33,215; Referee: Graham Poll (England)

26 November 2003 5	Marseille (France)	1–2	(Spain) Real Madrid	Marseille, France
20:45	Mido 64'		Beckham 35'; Ronaldo 73'	Stadium: Stade Vélodrome; Attendance: 54,745; Referee: Anders Frisk (Sweden)

9 December 2003 6	Partizan (Serbia and Montenegro)	1–1	(France) Marseille	Belgrade, Serbia and Montenegro
20:45	Delibašić 79'		Mido 61'	Stadium: Partizan Stadium; Attendance: 28,000; Referee: Manuel Mejuto González (Spain)

=== UEFA Cup ===
==== Third round ====
26 February 2004 First leg	Marseille (France)	1–0	(Ukraine) Dnipro Dnipropetrovsk	Marseille, France
19:00	Drogba 55' (pen.)	Report		Stadium: Stade Vélodrome; Attendance: 15,285; Referee: Georgios Kasnaferis (Greece)

3 March 2004 Second leg	Dnipro Dnipropetrovsk (Ukraine)	0–0 (0–1 agg.)	(France) Marseille	Dnipropetrovsk, Ukraine
17:00		Report		Stadium: Meteor Stadium; Attendance: 22,100; Referee: Claus Bo Larsen (Denmark)

==== Fourth round ====
11 March 2004 First leg	Liverpool (England)	1–1	(France) Marseille	Liverpool, England
21:00	Baroš 55'	Report	Drogba 78'	Stadium: Anfield; Attendance: 41,270; Referee: Yuri Baskakov (Russia)

25 March 2004 Second leg	Marseille (France)	2–1 (3–2 agg.)	(England) Liverpool	Marseille, France
21:00	Drogba 38' (pen.); Méïté 65'	Report	Heskey 15'	Stadium: Stade Vélodrome; Attendance: 55,000; Referee: Arturo Dauden Ibañez (Spain)

==== Quarter-finals ====
8 April 2004 First leg	Marseille (France)	1–0	(Italy) Internazionale	Marseille, France
21:00	Drogba 46'	Report		Stadium: Stade Vélodrome; Attendance: 58,000; Referee: Lucílio Batista (Portugal)

15 April 2004 Second leg	Internazionale (Italy)	0–1 (0–2 agg.)	(France) Marseille	Milan, Italy
20:45		Report	Meriem 74'	Stadium: San Siro; Attendance: 36,044; Referee: Kim Milton Nielsen (Denmark)

==== Semi-finals ====
22 April 2004 First leg	Newcastle United (England)	0–0	(France) Marseille	Newcastle upon Tyne, England
20:45		Report		Stadium: St James' Park; Attendance: 52,004; Referee: Valentin Ivanov (Russia)

6 May 2004 Second leg	Marseille (France)	2–0 (2–0 agg.)	(England) Newcastle United	Marseille, France
21:00	Drogba 18', 82'	Report		Stadium: Stade Vélodrome; Attendance: 58,897; Referee: Ľuboš Micheľ (Slovakia)

==== Final ====
19 May 2004 Final	Valencia (Spain)	2–0	(France) Marseille	Gothenburg, Sweden
20:45	Vicente 45' (pen.); Mista 58'	Report		Stadium: Ullevi; Attendance: 39,000; Referee: Pierluigi Collina (Italy)
