= 2002–03 Olympique de Marseille season =

Marseille
2002–03 season
- Chairman: Robert Louis-Dreyfus
- Manager: Alain Perrin
- Ligue 1: 3rd
- Coupe de France: Round of 32
- Coupe de la Ligue: Semi-finals
- Top goalscorer: Ibrahima Bakayoko (9)
Home colours	Away colours	Third colours

Olympique de Marseille almost won the French League for the first time in 11 years, having a remarkable run to third place, having only scored five goals more than it conceded. The most praised player was central defender Daniel Van Buyten, who was able to tighten up the defence, and also helping out with scoring several important goals. Without Marseille's goalscoring woes, it could have sustained a more serious title assault. Therefore it signed late-blooming starlet Didier Drogba from En Avant Guingamp, a move that was set to be among the best financial deals in the clubs' history.

== Squad ==
Note: Flags indicate national team as defined under FIFA eligibility rules; some limited exceptions apply. Players may hold more than one non-FIFA nationality.

No.	Pos.	Nation	Player
1	GK	CRO	Vedran Runje
2	DF	FRA	Jérôme Perez
3	DF	FRA	Manuel dos Santos
4	DF	BEL	Daniel Van Buyten
5	DF	ALG	Eduardo Tuzzio
6	MF	ALG	Brahim Hemdani
8	DF	FRA	Sébastien Pérez
9	FW	BRA	Fernandão
10	FW	CIV	Ibrahima Bakayoko
11	FW	FRA	Cyril Chapuis
12	DF	CIV	Abdoulaye Méïté
13	FW	SEN	Lamine Sakho
14	FW	FRA	Karim Dahou

No.	Pos.	Nation	Player
15	MF	FRA	Pascal Johansen
16	GK	FRA	Cédric Carrasso
17	MF	POR	Delfim
18	DF	FRA	Franck Leboeuf (captain)
20	MF	CMR	Salomon Olembé
21	DF	FRA	Johnny Ecker
22	FW	RUS	Dmitri Sytchev
25	DF	FRA	Fabien Laurenti
27	MF	FRA	Michel Gafour
28	DF	FRA	Loris Reina
29	MF	SUI	Fabio Celestini
33	FW	FRA	Laurent Merlin
—	MF	TUN	Fabien Camus

=== Left club during season ===
Note: Flags indicate national team as defined under FIFA eligibility rules; some limited exceptions apply. Players may hold more than one non-FIFA nationality.

No.	Pos.	Nation	Player
7	MF	POL	Piotr Świerczewski (on loan to Birmingham City)
19	MF	ALG	Djamel Belmadi (on loan to Manchester City)
23	MF	FRA	Sébastien Grégori (on loan to Créteil)

No.	Pos.	Nation	Player
24	MF	FRA	Mickaël Marsiglia (on loan to Racing Ferrol)
26	MF	FRA	Benjamin Gavanon (on loan to Nottingham Forest)

== Competitions ==
=== Ligue 1 ===
==== League table ====
Pos	Team	Pld	W	D	L	GF	GA	GD	Pts	Qualification or relegation
1	Lyon (C)	38	19	11	8	63	41	+22	68	Qualification to Champions League group stage
2	Monaco	38	19	10	9	66	33	+33	67	Qualification to Champions League group stage
3	Marseille	38	19	8	11	41	36	+5	65	Qualification to Champions League third qualifying round
4	Bordeaux	38	18	10	10	57	36	+21	64	Qualification to UEFA Cup first round
5	Sochaux	38	17	13	8	46	31	+15	64	Qualification to UEFA Cup first round

Source: Ligue 1
Rules for classification: 1) points; 2) goal difference; 3) number of goals scored.
(C) Champions

==== Results summary ====
Overall								Home						Away					
Pld	W	D	L	GF	GA	GD	Pts	W	D	L	GF	GA	GD	W	D	L	GF	GA	GD
38	19	8	11	41	36	+5	65	12	4	3	26	14	+12	7	4	8	15	22	−7

Source: LFP.fr

==== Results by round ====
Round	1	2	3	4	5	6	7	8	9	10	11	12	13	14	15	16	17	18	19	20	21	22	23	24	25	26	27	28	29	30	31	32	33	34	35	36	37	38
Ground	H	A	H	A	H	A	H	A	H	A	H	A	H	A	H	H	A	H	A	H	A	H	A	H	A	H	A	H	A	H	A	H	A	A	H	A	H	A
Result	L	W	D	W	D	L	W	W	W	L	W	L	W	D	D	W	L	W	W	D	L	W	D	W	L	W	W	W	D	L	W	L	D	W	W	L	W	L
Position	18	10	12	8	9	10	8	4	3	5	3	5	3	4	3	3	4	4	1	1	3	2	3	1	3	2	1	1	2	2	2	3	3	3	2	3	2	3

Source: LFP.fr
A = Away; H = Home; W = Win; D = Draw; L = Loss

==== Matches ====
3 August 2002 1	Marseille	0–2	Nantes	Lyon
17:15			Yepes 62'; Berson 90+3'	Stadium: Stade de Gerland; Attendance: 7,742; Referee: Bruno Derrien

10 August 2002 2	Monaco	0–1	Marseille	Monaco
20:00			Fernandão 54'	Stadium: Stade Louis II; Attendance: 17,172; Referee: Pascal Garibian

16 August 2002 3	Marseille	1–1	Lyon	Marseille
20:45	Bakayoko 29'		Govou 14'	Stadium: Stade Vélodrome; Attendance: 56,529; Referee: Laurent Duhamel

24 August 2002 4	Rennes	1–3	Marseille	Rennes
20:00	Piquionne 10'		Chapuis 35', 70'; Sakho 90+1'	Stadium: Stade de la Route de Lorient; Attendance: 23,205; Referee: Damien Ledentu

1 September 2002 5	Marseille	0–0	Auxerre	Marseille
20:45				Stadium: Stade Vélodrome; Attendance: 53,160; Referee: Philippe Kalt

11 September 2002 6	Nice	2–0	Marseille	Nice
18:00	Everson 52'; Olufade 82'			Stadium: Stade du Ray; Attendance: 13,614; Referee: Bertrand Layec

14 September 2002 7	Marseille	2–1	Bordeaux	Marseille
17:15	Leboeuf 16' (pen.); Bakayoko 75'		Pauleta 52'	Stadium: Stade Vélodrome; Attendance: 51,358; Referee: Alain Sars

21 September 2002 8	Le Havre	1–3	Marseille	Le Havre
20:00	Fauconnier 66'		Sakho 45+2'; Johansen 58'; Celestini 90'	Stadium: Stade Jules Deschaseaux; Attendance: 16,149; Referee: Hervé Piccirillo

27 September 2002 9	Marseille	3–1	Ajaccio	Marseille
20:45	Van Buyten 41'; Chapuis 45'; Bakayoko 77' (pen.)		Destruhaut 15'	Stadium: Stade Vélodrome; Attendance: 48,035; Referee: Damien Ledentu

5 October 2002 10	Lille	3–0	Marseille	Lille
20:00	Tapia 15'; Brunel 55'; Cheyrou 65'			Stadium: Stade Grimonprez-Jooris; Attendance: 20,211; Referee: Patrick Lhermite

20 October 2002 11	Marseille	1–0	Strasbourg	Marseille
20:45	Fernandão 24'			Stadium: Stade Vélodrome; Attendance: 47,131; Referee: Pascal Viléo

26 October 2002 12	Paris Saint-Germain	3–0	Marseille	Paris
17:15	Ronaldinho 15', 37' (pen.); Cardetti 82'			Stadium: Parc des Princes; Attendance: 41,949; Referee: Éric Poulat

2 November 2002 13	Marseille	2–0	Montpellier	Marseille
20:00	Bakayoko 32'; F. Silvestre 61' (o.g.)			Stadium: Stade Vélodrome; Attendance: 51,487; Referee: Stéphane Lannoy

9 November 2002 14	Guingamp	0–0	Marseille	Guingamp
20:00				Stadium: Stade du Roudourou; Attendance: 17,330; Referee: Alain Sars

16 November 2002 15	Marseille	0–0	Troyes	Marseille
20:00				Stadium: Stade Vélodrome; Attendance: 46,017; Referee: Bruno Ruffray

23 November 2002 16	Marseille	1–0	Lens	Marseille
17:15	Olembé 12'			Stadium: Stade Vélodrome; Attendance: 51,320; Referee: Pascal Garibian

30 November 2002 17	Bastia	2–0	Marseille	Furiani
20:00	Ben Saada 74', 87'			Stadium: Stade Armand Cesari; Attendance: 9,008; Referee: Damien Ledentu

4 December 2002 18	Marseille	1–0	Sochaux	Marseille
20:30	Fernandão 40'			Stadium: Stade Vélodrome; Attendance: 45,293; Referee: Patrick Lhermite

14 December 2002 19	Sedan	1–2	Marseille	Sedan
20:45	H. Camara 70'		dos Santos 39'; Bakayoko 49'	Stadium: Stade Louis Dugauguez; Attendance: 22,754; Referee: Hervé Piccirillo

20 December 2002 20	Marseille	1–1	Monaco	Marseille
20:30	Van Buyten 60'		Pršo 40'	Stadium: Stade Vélodrome; Attendance: 51,426; Referee: Stéphane Bré

10 January 2003 21	Lyon	1–0	Marseille	Lyon
20:45	Luyindula 41'			Stadium: Stade de Gerland; Attendance: 38,775; Referee: Pierluigi Collina (Italy)

14 January 2003 22	Marseille	2–0	Rennes	Marseille
20:45	Bakayoko 7'; Van Buyten 19'			Stadium: Stade Vélodrome; Attendance: 44,366; Referee: Jean-Marc Bonnin

21 January 2003 23	Auxerre	0–0	Marseille	Auxerre
20:45				Stadium: Stade Abbe-Deschamps; Attendance: 16,104; Referee: Laurent Duhamel

28 January 2003 24	Marseille	2–0	Nice	Marseille
20:45	Van Buyten 45+3'; Sychev 87'			Stadium: Stade Vélodrome; Attendance: 51,058; Referee: Pascal Garibian

2 February 2003 25	Bordeaux	3–1	Marseille	Bordeaux
20:45	Feindouno 56'; Darcheville 63' (pen.); Sávio 90+6'		Van Buyten 88'	Stadium: Stade Chaban-Delmas; Attendance: 32,793; Referee: Éric Poulat

5 February 2003 26	Marseille	2–0	Le Havre	Marseille
20:30	Sychev 16'; Van Buyten 52'			Stadium: Stade Vélodrome; Attendance: 45,170; Referee: Stéphane Moulin

8 February 2003 27	Ajaccio	0–2	Marseille	Ajaccio
17:15			Bakayoko 35'; Sakho 79' (pen.)	Stadium: Stade François Coty; Attendance: 8,305; Referee: Pascal Viléo

22 February 2003 28	Marseille	2–0	Lille	Marseille
20:00	Bakayoko 13'; Johansen 75'			Stadium: Stade Vélodrome; Attendance: 52,770; Referee: Philippe Kalt

1 March 2003 29	Strasbourg	0–0	Marseille	Strasbourg
20:00				Stadium: Stade de la Meinau; Attendance: 26,857; Referee: Alain Sars

9 March 2003 30	Marseille	0–3	Paris Saint-Germain	Marseille
20:45			Leroy 28', 83'; Ronaldinho 55'	Stadium: Stade Vélodrome; Attendance: 55,982; Referee: Bertrand Layec

22 March 2003 31	Montpellier	1–2	Marseille	Montpellier
17:15	Rouvière 71'		Sakho 22'; Van Buyten 83'	Stadium: Stade de la Mosson; Attendance: 26,096; Referee: Laurent Duhamel

5 April 2003 32	Marseille	0–2	Guingamp	Marseille
20:00			Bah 12'; Drogba 16'	Stadium: Stade Vélodrome; Attendance: 51,643; Referee: Patrick Lhermite

12 April 2003 33	Troyes	0–0	Marseille	Troyes
17:15				Stadium: Stade de l'Aube; Attendance: 14,211; Referee: Stéphane Moulin

20 April 2003 34	Lens	0–1	Marseille	Lens
20:45			Leboeuf 33' (pen.)	Stadium: Stade Félix-Bollaert; Attendance: 40,825; Referee: Pascal Garibian

3 May 2003 35	Marseille	2–1	Bastia	Marseille
17:15	Sychev 45'; Van Buyten 87'		Batlles 90+3'	Stadium: Stade Vélodrome; Attendance: 55,356; Referee: Hervé Piccirillo

10 May 2003 36	Sochaux	3–0	Marseille	Montbéliard
20:00	Santos 28'; Frau 65'; Isabey 86'			Stadium: Stade Auguste Bonal; Attendance: 19,910; Referee: Alain Hamer

20 May 2003 37	Marseille	4–2	Sedan	Marseille
20:00	Pérez 10'; Chapuis 43'; Hemdani 83'; Sakho 89'		N'Diefi 57'; Pérez 61' (o.g.)	Stadium: Stade Vélodrome; Attendance: 50,593; Referee: Laurent Duhamel

24 May 2003 38	Nantes	1–0	Marseille	Nantes
20:30	Quint 84'			Stadium: Stade de la Beaujoire; Attendance: 36,411; Referee: Stéphane Bré

==== Top Scorers ====
- (Ivory Coast) Ibrahima Bakayoko 9 (1)
- (Belgium) Daniel Van Buyten 8
- (France) Cyril Chapuis 4
- (Senegal) Lamine Sakho 4 (1)
- (Brazil) Fernandão 4
- (Russia) Dmitri Sychev 3

=== Coupe de France ===
4 January 2003 Round of 64	Marseille	2–0	Bastia	Marseille
17:00	Fernandão 77'; Olembe 90'			Stadium: Stade Vélodrome; Attendance: 28,000; Referee: Alain Sars

25 January 2003 Round of 32	Paris Saint-Germain	2–1 (a.e.t.)	Marseille	Paris
20:45	Pochettino 14'; Fiorèse 102'		Van Buyten 62'	Stadium: Parc des Princes; Attendance: 38,150; Referee: Stéphane Bré

=== Coupe de la Ligue ===
7 December 2002 Second round	Marseille	5–1	Troyes	Marseille
20:00	Bakayoko 22' (pen.), 29', 60'; Belmadi 30'; Pérez 72'		Thomas 45+1'	Stadium: Stade Vélodrome; Attendance: 19,081; Referee: Bruno Derrien

18 January 2003 Round of 16	Marseille	4–0	Créteil	Marseille
21:00	Chapuis 1', 41'; Sychev 83'; Swierczewski 90+3'			Stadium: Stade Vélodrome; Attendance: 21,000; Referee: Thierry Auriac

4 March 2003 Quarter-finals	Saint-Étienne	0–2	Marseille	Saint-Étienne
21:00			Fernandão 31'; Sakho 50'	Stadium: Stade Geoffroy Guichard; Attendance: 32,767; Referee: Pascal Garibian

16 April 2003 Quarter-finals	Marseille	0–1	Monaco	Marseille
21:00			Pršo 49'	Stadium: Stade Vélodrome; Attendance: 44,201; Referee: Alain Sars

== Sources ==
- RSSSF - France 2002/03
