= 2001–02 Olympique de Marseille season =

Marseille
2001–02 season
- Chairman: Robert Louis-Dreyfus
- Manager: Tomislav Ivić; Zoran Vujović; Albert Emon
- Division 1: 9th
- Coupe de France: Round of 32
- Coupe de la Ligue: Round of 16
- Top goalscorer: Lamine Sakho (6)
Home colours	Away colours	Third colours

Olympique de Marseille at least managed to become a midfield team in the 2001-02 French league season. Despite the mid-table mediocrity, l'OM still attracted more than 50.000 spectators on average, helping the clubs' mired economy getting out of the crisis.

== Squad ==
Note: Flags indicate national team as defined under FIFA eligibility rules; some limited exceptions apply. Players may hold more than one non-FIFA nationality.

No.	Pos.	Nation	Player
1	GK	(Croatia) CRO	Vedran Runje
2	DF	(Nigeria) NGA	Joseph Yobo
5	DF	(Argentina) ARG	Eduardo Tuzzio
3	DF	(France) FRA	Manuel dos Santos
4	DF	(Belgium) BEL	Daniel Van Buyten
6	MF	(Algeria) ALG	Brahim Hemdani
7	MF	(Poland) POL	Piotr Świerczewski
8	MF	(France) FRA	Ibrahim Ba (on loan from Milan)
9	FW	(Brazil) BRA	Fernandão
10	FW	(Ivory Coast) CIV	Ibrahima Bakayoko
11	DF	(Italy) ITA	Stefano Torrisi (on loan from Parma)
12	DF	(Ivory Coast) CIV	Abdoulaye Méïté
13	DF	(Portugal) POR	Dimas (on loan from Sporting CP)
14	FW	(France) FRA	Karim Dahou
15	DF	(France) FRA	Franck Jurietti (on loan from Monaco)
16	GK	(France) FRA	Damien Grégorini

No.	Pos.	Nation	Player
17	MF	(Portugal) POR	Delfim
18	DF	(France) FRA	Franck Leboeuf (captain)
19	MF	(Algeria) ALG	Djamel Belmadi
20	MF	(Cameroon) CMR	Salomon Olembé
21	FW	(Senegal) SEN	Lamine Sakho
22	FW	(France) FRA	Pascal Nouma
23	FW	(France) FRA	Guillaume Deschamps
24	MF	(Spain) ESP	Alberto Rivera (on loan from Real Madrid)
25	DF	(France) FRA	Fabien Laurenti
27	MF	(France) FRA	Wilfried Dalmat (on loan from Nantes)
28	MF	(Brazil) BRA	André Luiz (on loan from Corinthians)
29	FW	(Spain) ESP	Alfonso (on loan from Barcelona)
30	GK	(Switzerland) SUI	Claudio Gentile
32	FW	(France) FRA	Cyril Chapuis
—	DF	(France) FRA	Camille Borios

=== Left club during season ===
Note: Flags indicate national team as defined under FIFA eligibility rules; some limited exceptions apply. Players may hold more than one non-FIFA nationality.

No.	Pos.	Nation	Player
13	MF	(France) FRA	Fabrice Fernandes (to Southampton)
21	DF	(France) FRA	Zoumana Camara (to Lens)
22	FW	(Brazil) BRA	Dill (to São Paulo)

No.	Pos.	Nation	Player
23	MF	(France) FRA	Jérôme Leroy (to Paris Saint-Germain)
24	FW	(Belgium) BEL	Jurgen Cavens (return from loan to Standard Liège)

== Competitions ==
=== Division 1 ===
==== League table ====
Pos	Team	Pld	W	D	L	GF	GA	GD	Pts	Qualification or relegation
7	Troyes	34	13	8	13	40	35	+5	47	Qualification to Intertoto Cup second round
8	Sochaux	34	12	10	12	41	40	+1	46	Qualification to Intertoto Cup second round
9	Marseille	34	11	11	12	34	39	−5	44	
10	Nantes	34	12	7	15	35	41	−6	43	
11	Bastia	34	12	5	17	38	44	−6	41	

Source: Ligue 1
Rules for classification: 1) points; 2) goal difference; 3) number of goals scored.

==== Results summary ====
Overall								Home						Away					
Pld	W	D	L	GF	GA	GD	Pts	W	D	L	GF	GA	GD	W	D	L	GF	GA	GD
34	11	11	12	34	39	−5	44	10	5	2	25	13	+12	1	6	10	9	26	−17

Source: LFP.fr

==== Results by round ====
Round	1	2	3	4	5	6	7	8	9	10	11	12	13	14	15	16	17	18	19	20	21	22	23	24	25	26	27	28	29	30	31	32	33	34
Ground	A	H	A	H	A	H	A	H	A	A	H	A	H	A	H	A	H	A	H	A	H	A	H	A	H	H	A	H	A	H	A	H	A	H
Result	D	D	L	L	L	D	D	W	L	W	D	L	W	D	W	D	W	D	L	L	D	L	W	L	W	W	L	W	L	D	L	W	D	W
Position	7	11	15	16	16	16	17	16	17	14	14	15	13	14	9	10	10	9	9	10	11	11	11	12	11	8	10	10	11	12	11	10	9	9

Source: LFP.fr
A = Away; H = Home; W = Win; D = Draw; L = Loss

==== Matches ====
28 July 2001 1	Montpellier	1–1	Marseille	Montpellier
20:00	Maoulida 76' (pen.)		Bakayoko 28'	Stadium: Stade de la Mosson; Attendance: 29,638; Referee: Alain Hamer

3 August 2001 2	Marseille	0–0	Bordeaux	Marseille
20:45				Stadium: Stade Vélodrome; Attendance: 55,803; Referee: Stéphane Bré

11 August 2001 3	Lens	2–0	Marseille	Lens
20:00	Sakho 60', 65'			Stadium: Stade Félix-Bollaert; Attendance: 40,327; Referee: Pascal Garibian

18 August 2001 4	Marseille	0–1	Troyes	Marseille
20:00			Gousse 58'	Stadium: Stade Vélodrome; Attendance: 55,719; Referee: Patrick Lhermite

25 August 2001 5	Bastia	1–0	Marseille	Furiani
20:00	Beneforti 35'			Stadium: Stade Armand Cesari; Attendance: 11,333; Referee: Damien Ledentu

8 September 2001 6	Marseille	0–0	Lyon	Marseille
17:15				Stadium: Stade Vélodrome; Attendance: 55,529; Referee: Alain Sars

16 September 2001 7	Sedan	1–1	Marseille	Sedan
20:45	Peyrelade 20'		Van Buyten 16'	Stadium: Stade Louis-Dugauguez; Attendance: 20,150; Referee: Bertrand Layec

22 September 2001 8	Marseille	2–0	Nantes	Marseille
20:00	Bakayoko 86', 90+1'			Stadium: Stade Vélodrome; Attendance: 54,752; Referee: Hervé Piccirillo

29 September 2001 9	Guingamp	1–0	Marseille	Guingamp
17:15	Fiorèse 10'			Stadium: Stade de Roudourou; Attendance: 12,774; Referee: Philippe Kalt

13 October 2001 10	Metz	0–2	Marseille	Metz
17:15			Nouma 10'; Fernandão 82'	Stadium: Stade Saint-Symphorien; Attendance: 25,609; Referee: Laurent Duhamel

20 October 2001 11	Marseille	0–0	Lille	Marseille
20:00				Stadium: Stade Vélodrome; Attendance: 50,476; Referee: Bruno Derrien

26 October 2001 12	Auxerre	2–0	Marseille	Auxerre
20:45	Fadiga 4'; Cissé 32'			Stadium: Stade de l'Abbé-Deschamps; Attendance: 20,502; Referee: Stéphane Bré

3 November 2001 13	Marseille	2–1	Rennes	Marseille
20:00	Fernandão 13'; Leboeuf 85' (pen.)		Monterrubio 87' (pen.)	Stadium: Stade Vélodrome; Attendance: 49,668; Referee: Damien Ledentu

16 November 2001 14	Monaco	1–1	Marseille	Monaco
20:45	Nonda 54' (pen.)		Bakayoko 70'	Stadium: Stade Louis II; Attendance: 16,000; Referee: Éric Poulat

24 November 2001 15	Marseille	4–2	Sochaux	Marseille
17:15	André Luiz 26'; Bakayoko 34', 53'; Świerczewski 81'		Meriem 18'; Pagis 48'	Stadium: Stade Vélodrome; Attendance: 54,425; Referee: Pascal Viléo

29 November 2001 16	Paris Saint-Germain	0–0	Marseille	Paris
20:45				Stadium: Parc des Princes; Attendance: 42,178; Referee: Bertrand Layec

8 December 2001 17	Marseille	3–2	Lorient	Marseille
20:00	Cavens 25'; Leroy 74'; André Luiz 85'		Świerczewski 33' (o.g.); Feindouno 54'	Stadium: Stade Vélodrome; Attendance: 55,703; Referee: Pascal Garibian

18 December 2001 18	Bordeaux	0–0	Marseille	Bordeaux
20:45				Stadium: Stade Chaban-Delmas; Attendance: 32,389; Referee: Alain Sars

21 December 2001 19	Marseille	1–2	Lens	Marseille
20:45	Leboeuf 17' (pen.)		Diouf 40'; Coulibaly 82'	Stadium: Stade Vélodrome; Attendance: 53,392; Referee: Stéphane Bré

12 January 2002 21	Marseille	2–2	Bastia	Marseille
20:00	Alfonso 6'; Rivera 34'		Dieuze 54'; Essien 69'	Stadium: Stade Vélodrome; Attendance: 49,129; Referee: Philippe Kalt

23 January 2002 22	Lyon	4–0	Marseille	Lyon
20:30	Anderson 25' (pen.), 35'; Jurietti 30' (o.g.); Govou 32'			Stadium: Stade de Gerland; Attendance: 38,376; Referee: Laurent Duhamel

30 January 2002 23	Marseille	2–1	Sedan	Marseille
20:30	Alfonso 4', 67'		Poueys 79'	Stadium: Stade Vélodrome; Attendance: 49,129; Referee: Améziane Khendek

26 January 2002 20	Troyes	1–0	Marseille	Troyes
17:15	Gousse 47'			Stadium: Stade de l'Aube; Attendance: 15,715; Referee: Franck Glochon

3 February 2002 24	Nantes	3–1	Marseille	Nantes
20:45	Berson 36', 45'; Torrisi 39' (o.g.)		Dalmat 23'	Stadium: Stade de la Beaujoire; Attendance: 35,453; Referee: Damien Ledentu

6 February 2002 25	Marseille	2–1	Guingamp	Marseille
20:30	Sakho 21'; Rivera 71' (pen.)		Saci 26'	Stadium: Stade Vélodrome; Attendance: 46,630; Referee: Dominique Fraise

16 February 2002 26	Marseille	1–0	Metz	Marseille
20:00	Sakho 45+4'			Stadium: Stade Vélodrome; Attendance: 48,154; Referee: Thierry Auriac

24 February 2002 27	Lille	2–0	Marseille	Lille
20:45	Cheyrou 35' (pen.); Bakari 90+3'			Stadium: Stade Grimonprez-Jooris; Attendance: 19,547; Referee: Bertrand Layec

16 March 2002 29	Rennes	2–1	Marseille	Rennes
17:15	Arribagé 59'; Piquionne 73'		Bakayoko 83'	Stadium: Stade de la Route de Lorient; Attendance: 22,656; Referee: Alain Sars

24 March 2002 30	Marseille	1–1	Monaco	Marseille
20:45	Alfonso 90+1'		Nonda 73'	Stadium: Stade Vélodrome; Attendance: 48,964; Referee: Stéphane Bré

1 April 2002 28	Marseille	3–0	Auxerre	Marseille
19:00	Leboeuf 7'; Sakho 73'; Bakayoko 85'			Stadium: Stade Vélodrome; Attendance: 50,544; Referee: Pascal Garibian

6 April 2002 31	Sochaux	3–0	Marseille	Montbéliard
20:00	Saveljić 19'; Frau 35' (pen.), 63'			Stadium: Stade Auguste-Bonal; Attendance: 19,907; Referee: Améziane Khendek

12 April 2002 32	Marseille	1–0	Paris Saint-Germain	Marseille
20:45	Van Buyten 65'			Stadium: Stade Vélodrome; Attendance: 57,797; Referee: Laurent Duhamel

27 April 2002 33	Lorient	2–2	Marseille	Lorient
20:00	Darcheville 76' (pen.); Esceth-N'Zi 90'		Fernandão 33'; Sakho 87'	Stadium: Stade du Moustoir; Attendance: 15,996; Referee: Stéphane Moulin

4 May 2002 34	Marseille	1–0	Montpellier	Marseille
20:00	Sakho 51'			Stadium: Stade Vélodrome; Attendance: 47,813; Referee: Patrick Lhermite

==== Topscorers ====
- (Ivory Coast) Ibrahima Bakayoko 8
- (Senegal) Lamine Sakho 5
- (Spain) Alfonso 4
- (Brazil) Fernandão 3
- (France) Franck Leboeuf 3

=== Coupe de France ===
15 December 2001 Round of 64	Marseille	2–0	Saint-Leu	Marseille
17:00	André Luiz 31'; Leboeuf 85' (pen.)			Stadium: Stade Vélodrome; Attendance: 8,000; Referee: Michel Bonnichon

19 January 2002 Round of 32	Lens	0–1	Marseille	Lens
17:00			Rivera 62'	Stadium: Stade Félix-Bollaert; Attendance: 28,630; Referee: Éric Poulat

10 February 2002 Round of 16	Paris Saint-Germain	1–1 (a.e.t.) (7–6 p)	Marseille	Paris
20:45	Heinze 87'		Van Buyten 68'	Stadium: Parc des Princes; Attendance: 33,790; Referee: Alain Sars
	Penalties
	Déhu (penalty scored); Leal (penalty missed); Aloísio (penalty scored); Alex (penalty missed); Ronaldinho (penalty scored); Heinze (penalty scored); Leroy (penalty scored); Fiorèse (penalty scored); El Karkouri (penalty scored)		(penalty missed) Delfim; (penalty missed) Dalmat; (penalty scored) Luiz; (penalty scored) Tuzzio; (penalty scored) Alfonso; (penalty scored) Bakayoko; (penalty scored) Jurietti; (penalty scored) Dos Santos; (penalty missed) Van Buyten

=== Coupe de la Ligue ===
2 December 2001 Second round	Marseille	0–0 (a.e.t.) (4–2 p)	Montpellier	Marseille
20:45				Stadium: Stade Vélodrome; Attendance: 13,000; Referee: Stéphane Moulin
	Penalties
	Świerczewski (penalty missed); Belmadi (penalty scored); Bakayoko (penalty scored); Cavens (penalty scored); Leroy (penalty scored)		(penalty scored) Barbosa; (penalty missed) Carotti; (penalty missed) Džodić; (penalty scored) Fugier

9 January 2002 Round of 16	Monaco	2–1	Marseille	Monaco
20:45	Nonda 45' (pen.); Bierhoff 88'		André Luiz 76' (pen.)	Stadium: Stade Louis II; Attendance: 10,000; Referee: Bruno Derrien

== Sources ==
- RSSSF - France 2001/02
