= 2004–05 Olympique de Marseille season =

Marseille
2004–05 season
- Chairman: Robert Louis-Dreyfus
- Manager: José Anigo; Albert Emon; Philippe Troussier
- Ligue 1: 5th
- Coupe de France: First round
- Coupe de la Ligue: Round of 32
- Top goalscorer: Péguy Luyindula (10)
Home colours	Away colours	Third colours

Olympique de Marseille had a disappointing season, with three managers passing by en route to a fifth-place finish in Ligue 1 and two premature domestic cup exits. With striker Didier Drogba being sold to Chelsea, and replacements Habib Bamogo and Péguy Luyindula not performing at a similar level, the goal-scoring went dry, but in spite of scoring two points less than the previous season, OM finished two positions above the previous season.

== Squad ==
Note: Flags indicate national team as defined under FIFA eligibility rules; some limited exceptions apply. Players may hold more than one non-FIFA nationality.

No.	Pos.	Nation	Player
1	GK	(France) FRA	Pegguy Arphexad
2	DF	(Brazil) BRA	Léo Matos
3	DF	(Nigeria) NGA	Taye Taiwo
4	DF	(Brazil) BRA	Demetrius Ferreira
5	DF	(France) FRA	Frédéric Déhu
6	MF	(Algeria) ALG	Brahim Hemdani
7	FW	(France) FRA	Steve Marlet (on loan from Fulham)
8	MF	(France) FRA	Bruno Cheyrou (on loan from Liverpool)
10	FW	(Spain) ESP	Koke
11	FW	(France) FRA	Fabrice Fiorèse
12	DF	(Ivory Coast) CIV	Abdoulaye Méïté
13	MF	(France) FRA	Ahmed Yahiaoui
14	FW	(France) FRA	Péguy Luyindula
15	MF	(Cameroon) CMR	Salomon Olembé
16	GK	(France) FRA	Fabien Barthez

No.	Pos.	Nation	Player
17	MF	(France) FRA	Benoît Pedretti
18	MF	(Brazil) BRA	Eduardo Costa
19	DF	(France) FRA	Rémi Ribault
20	MF	(France) FRA	Laurent Batlles
21	DF	(France) FRA	Johnny Ecker
22	MF	(France) FRA	Samir Nasri
23	DF	(Senegal) SEN	Habib Beye
25	MF	(Senegal) SEN	Sylvain N'Diaye
26	FW	(Burkina Faso) BFA	Habib Bamogo
27	MF	(Japan) JPN	Koji Nakata
28	DF	(Senegal) SEN	Leyti N'Diaye
29	FW	(France) FRA	Karim Dahou
30	GK	(France) FRA	Jérémy Gavanon
33	DF	(France) FRA	Philippe Christanval

=== Left club during season ===
Note: Flags indicate national team as defined under FIFA eligibility rules; some limited exceptions apply. Players may hold more than one non-FIFA nationality.

No.	Pos.	Nation	Player
1	GK	(France) FRA	Cédric Carrasso (on loan to Guingamp)
3	DF	(France) FRA	Bixente Lizarazu (to Bayern Munich)

== Competitions ==
=== Ligue 1 ===
==== League table ====
Pos	Team	Pld	W	D	L	GF	GA	GD	Pts	Qualification or relegation
3	Monaco	38	15	18	5	52	35	+17	63	Qualification to Champions League third qualifying round
4	Rennes	38	15	10	13	49	42	+7	55	Qualification to UEFA Cup first round
5	Marseille	38	15	10	13	47	42	+5	55	Qualification to Intertoto Cup third round
6	Saint-Étienne	38	12	17	9	47	34	+13	53	Qualification to Intertoto Cup third round
7	Lens	38	13	13	12	45	39	+6	52	Qualification to Intertoto Cup second round

Source: Ligue 1
Rules for classification: 1) points; 2) goal difference; 3) number of goals scored.

==== Results summary ====
Overall								Home						Away					
Pld	W	D	L	GF	GA	GD	Pts	W	D	L	GF	GA	GD	W	D	L	GF	GA	GD
38	15	10	13	47	42	+5	55	9	4	6	26	19	+7	6	6	7	21	23	−2

Source: LFP.fr

==== Results by round ====
Round	1	2	3	4	5	6	7	8	9	10	11	12	13	14	15	16	17	18	19	20	21	22	23	24	25	26	27	28	29	30	31	32	33	34	35	36	37	38
Ground	H	H	A	H	A	H	A	H	A	H	A	H	A	H	A	H	A	H	A	A	H	A	H	A	H	A	H	A	H	A	H	A	H	A	H	A	H	A
Result	W	W	D	L	L	W	L	W	W	D	D	D	L	W	L	W	W	L	D	W	W	W	L	W	W	W	D	L	W	L	D	L	L	D	L	D	L	D
Position	4	1	3	8	10	7	11	6	5	5	5	5	6	6	7	5	3	5	5	5	5	5	5	5	3	2	2	2	2	2	3	3	3	4	4	4	5	5

Source: LFP.fr
A = Away; H = Home; W = Win; D = Draw; L = Loss

==== Matches ====
7 August 2004 1	Marseille	1–0	Bordeaux	Marseille
20:00	Batlles 90'			Stadium: Stade Vélodrome; Attendance: 56,196; Referee: Alain Sars

15 August 2004 2	Marseille	3–0	Lille	Marseille
21:00	Bamogo 39'; Marlet 90'; Eduardo 90+4'			Stadium: Stade Vélodrome; Attendance: 55,689; Referee: Damien Ledentu

21 August 2004 3	Nice	1–1	Marseille	Nice
17:15	Dié 62' (pen.)		Pedretti 47'	Stadium: Stade du Ray; Attendance: 15,187; Referee: Stéphane Bré

28 August 2004 4	Marseille	1–3	Metz	Marseille
20:00	Luyindula 28'		Tum 12', 90+1'; Borbiconi 89'	Stadium: Stade Vélodrome; Attendance: 55,490; Referee: Olivier Thual

12 September 2004 5	Sochaux	2–0	Marseille	Montbéliard
21:00	Mathieu 37'; Santos 63'			Stadium: Stade Auguste Bonal; Attendance: 19,931; Referee: Gilles Veissière

18 September 2004 6	Marseille	1–0	Toulouse	Marseille
20:00	Luyindula 34'			Stadium: Stade Vélodrome; Attendance: 54,425; Referee: Alain Hamer

22 September 2004 7	Rennes	1–0	Marseille	Rennes
18:00	Frei 58'			Stadium: Stade de la Route de Lorient; Attendance: 26,264; Referee: Pascal Garibian

25 September 2004 8	Marseille	1–0	Bastia	Marseille
20:00	Batlles 78'			Stadium: Stade Vélodrome; Attendance: 50,753; Referee: Stéphane Moulin

2 October 2004 9	Istres	0–2	Marseille	Nîmes
17:15			Bamogo 16'; N'Diaye 48'	Stadium: Stade des Costières; Attendance: 13,614; Referee: Claude Colombo

17 October 2004 10	Marseille	1–1	Saint-Étienne	Marseille
21:00	Koke 90'		Feindouno 16'	Stadium: Stade Vélodrome; Attendance: 55,095; Referee: Patrick Lhermite

24 October 2004 11	Lens	0–0	Marseille	Lens
21:00				Stadium: Stade Félix-Bollaert; Attendance: 40,281; Referee: Damien Ledentu

29 October 2004 12	Marseille	1–1	Monaco	Marseille
21:00	Koke 20'		Squillaci 32'	Stadium: Stade Vélodrome; Attendance: 55,780; Referee: Bertrand Layec

7 November 2004 13	Paris Saint-Germain	2–1	Marseille	Paris
21:00	Pauleta 32'; Cissé 70'		Batlles 42'	Stadium: Parc des Princes; Attendance: 43,131; Referee: Gilles Veissière

13 November 2004 14	Marseille	2–0	Strasbourg	Marseille
20:00	Bamogo 53'; Koke 69'			Stadium: Stade Vélodrome; Attendance: 49,754; Referee: Laurent Duhamel

20 November 2004 15	Ajaccio	2–0	Marseille	Ajaccio
20:00	André Luiz 12' (pen.), 47'			Stadium: Stade François Coty; Attendance: 4,156; Referee: Philippe Kalt

27 November 2004 16	Marseille	3–1	Nantes	Marseille
20:00	Méïté 15'; Fiorèse 21'; Marlet 90'		Yapi Yapo 58'	Stadium: Stade Vélodrome; Attendance: 50,124; Referee: Pascal Viléo

4 December 2004 17	Caen	2–3	Marseille	Caen
20:00	Dufer 43'; Watier 82' (pen.)		Bamogo 26', 47' (pen.); Koke 67'	Stadium: Stade Michel d'Ornano; Attendance: 20,972; Referee: Hervé Piccirillo

11 December 2004 18	Marseille	0–1	Auxerre	Marseille
17:15			Benjani 63'	Stadium: Stade Vélodrome; Attendance: 52,452; Referee: Bertrand Layec

17 December 2004 19	Lyon	1–1	Marseille	Lyon
21:00	Govou 38'		Luyindula 3'	Stadium: Stade de Gerland; Attendance: 38,728; Referee: Claude Colombo

11 January 2005 20	Lille	1–2	Marseille	Villeneuve-d'Ascq
21:00	Brunel 53' (pen.)		Marlet 3'; Nasri 22'	Stadium: Stadium Lille-Metropole; Attendance: 16,388; Referee: Pascal Viléo

16 January 2005 21	Marseille	2–0	Nice	Marseille
21:00	Luyindula 3', 14'			Stadium: Stade Vélodrome; Attendance: 49,650; Referee: Laurent Duhamel

22 January 2005 22	Metz	0–1	Marseille	Metz
17:15			Luyindula 24'	Stadium: Stade Saint-Symphorien; Attendance: 25,908; Referee: Bruno Ruffray

25 January 2005 23	Marseille	0–2	Sochaux	Marseille
21:00			Santos 52'; Pitau 69'	Stadium: Stade Vélodrome; Attendance: 48,664; Referee: Pascal Garibian

29 January 2005 24	Toulouse	1–3	Marseille	Toulouse
20:00	Taïder 23'		Batlles 12'; Marlet 44'; Luyindula 81'	Stadium: Stadium de Toulouse; Attendance: 35,767; Referee: Philippe Kalt

5 February 2005 25	Marseille	3–1	Rennes	Marseille
20:00	Cheyrou 35'; Batlles 42'; Marlet 52'		Maoulida 80'	Stadium: Stade Vélodrome; Attendance: 50,526; Referee: Bruno Derrien

19 February 2005 26	Bastia	0–1	Marseille	Furiani
20:00			Pedretti 63'	Stadium: Stade Armand Cesari; Attendance: 6,591; Referee: Bertrand Layec

27 February 2005 27	Marseille	1–1	Istres	Marseille
21:00	Batlles 55'		N'Diaye 48'	Stadium: Stade Vélodrome; Attendance: 48,766; Referee: Stéphane Bré

6 March 2005 28	Saint-Étienne	2–0	Marseille	Saint-Étienne
21:00	Feindouno 36' (pen.); Hellebuyck 83'			Stadium: Stade Geoffroy-Guichard; Attendance: 35,070; Referee: Pascal Garibian

12 March 2005 29	Marseille	2–1	Lens	Marseille
20:00	Marlet 30', 73'		Utaka 28'	Stadium: Stade Vélodrome; Attendance: 54,350; Referee: Claude Colombo

20 March 2005 30	Monaco	2–1	Marseille	Monaco
21:00	Maicon 24'; Adebayor 41'		Bernardi 46' (o.g.)	Stadium: Stade Louis II; Attendance: 17,315; Referee: Bertrand Layec

3 April 2005 31	Marseille	1–1	Paris Saint-Germain	Marseille
21:00	Batlles 74'		Nakata 46' (o.g.)	Stadium: Stade Vélodrome; Attendance: 56,087; Referee: Éric Poulat

9 April 2005 32	Strasbourg	1–0	Marseille	Strasbourg
20:00	Niang 90'			Stadium: Stade de la Meinau; Attendance: 26,659; Referee: Laurent Duhamel

16 April 2005 33	Marseille	1–2	Ajaccio	Marseille
20:00	Beye 59'		Demont 25'; Marcelo 53'	Stadium: Stade Vélodrome; Attendance: 52,704; Referee: Pascal Viléo

23 April 2005 34	Nantes	2–2	Marseille	Nantes
20:00	Quint 28', 47'		Pedretti 68'; Koke 82'	Stadium: Stade de la Beaujoire; Attendance: 37,022; Referee: Bertrand Layec

7 May 2005 35	Marseille	2–3	Caen	Marseille
17:15	Luyindula 67'; Batlles 89'		Mazure 28'; Valero 43'; Watier 90'	Stadium: Stade Vélodrome; Attendance: 53,386; Referee: Damien Ledentu

14 May 2005 36	Auxerre	0–0	Marseille	Auxerre
20:00				Stadium: Stade de l'Abbé Deschamps; Attendance: 21,227; Referee: Alain Hamer

21 May 2005 37	Marseille	0–1	Lyon	Marseille
20:45			Juninho 56'	Stadium: Stade Vélodrome; Attendance: 57,041; Referee: Claude Colombo

28 May 2005 38	Bordeaux	3–3	Marseille	Bordeaux
20:00	Laslandes 19'; Meriem 63' (pen.); Francia 85'		Luyindula 22', 26' (pen.); Fiorèse 26'	Stadium: Stade Chaban-Delmas; Attendance: 32,712; Referee: Éric Poulat

=== Coupe de France ===
8 January 2005 Round of 64	Marseille	2–3	Angers	Marseille
18:00	Dussart 11' (o.g.); Déhu 73'		Dussart 57'; Gourvennec 59'; Théréau 63'	Stadium: Stade Vélodrome; Attendance: 15,000; Referee: Tony Chapron

=== Coupe de la Ligue ===
10 November 2004 Second round	Marseille	2–3	Paris Saint-Germain	Marseille
21:00	Pedretti 38'; Bamogo 41' (pen.)		Bošković 45', 53'; Mendy 89'	Stadium: Stade Vélodrome; Attendance: 54,281; Referee: Stéphane Bré

== Sources ==
- RSSSF - France 2004/05
