= 2003–04 Leeds United A.F.C. season =

2003–04 season of Leeds United

Leeds United
2003–04 season
- Chairman: Professor John McKenzie (until 15 December); Trevor Birch (until 19 March); Gerald Krasner (from 19 March)
- Manager: Peter Reid (until 10 November); Eddie Gray (from 10 November)
- Stadium: Elland Road
- Premier League: 19th (relegated)
- FA Cup: Third round
- League Cup: Third round
- Top goalscorer: League: Mark Viduka (11); All: Mark Viduka (12)
- Highest home attendance: 40,153 vs Manchester United (18 October 2003, Premier League)
- Lowest home attendance: 29,211 vs Swindon Town (24 September 2003, League Cup)
- Average home league attendance: 36,119

The 2003–04 season saw Leeds United competing in the Premier League (known as the FA Barclaycard Premiership for sponsorship reasons) for a twelfth successive season.

== Competitions ==
=== Premier League ===
==== League table ====
Pos	Team	Pld	W	D	L	GF	GA	GD	Pts	Qualification or relegation
16	Manchester City	38	9	14	15	55	54	+1	41	
17	Everton	38	9	12	17	45	57	−12	39	
18	Leicester City (R)	38	6	15	17	48	65	−17	33	Relegation to the Football League Championship
19	Leeds United (R)	38	8	9	21	40	79	−39	33	Relegation to the Football League Championship
20	Wolverhampton Wanderers (R)	38	7	12	19	38	77	−39	33	Relegation to the Football League Championship

Source: Premier League
Rules for classification: 1) points; 2) goal difference; 3) number of goals scored.
(R) Relegated

==== Results by round ====
Round	1	2	3	4	5	6	7	8	9	10	11	12	13	14	15	16	17	18	19	20	21	22	23	24	25	26	27	28	29	30	31	32	33	34	35	36	37	38
Ground	H	A	H	A	A	H	A	H	H	A	H	A	H	A	H	H	A	H	A	A	H	A	H	A	H	A	H	A	H	A	H	A	H	A	H	A	H	A
Result	D	L	D	W	L	L	L	W	L	L	L	L	L	W	D	W	D	D	L	L	L	L	L	L	W	D	D	L	W	L	W	W	D	L	L	L	D	L
Position	9	13	14	12	14	16	18	16	17	19	20	20	20	20	19	19	19	19	19	19	19	20	20	20	19	20	20	20	19	19	19	18	18	18	18	19	20	19

Source: Statto.com
A = Away; H = Home; W = Win; D = Draw; L = Loss

==== Matches ====
17 August 2003 1	Leeds United	2–2	Newcastle United	Leeds
14:00	Viduka 24'; Smith 57'	Report	Shearer 20' (pen.), 88'	Stadium: Elland Road; Attendance: 36,766; Referee: Alan Wiley

23 August 2003 2	Tottenham Hotspur	2–1	Leeds United	Haringey
15:00	Taricco 41'; Kanouté 71'	Report	Smith 5'	Stadium: White Hart Lane; Attendance: 34,354; Referee: Steve Dunn

26 August 2003 3	Leeds United	0–0	Southampton	Leeds
19:30		Report		Stadium: Elland Road; Attendance: 34,721; Referee: Paul Durkin

30 August 2003 4	Middlesbrough	2–3	Leeds United	Middlesbrough
15:00	Németh 60'; Paulista 63'	Report	Sakho 16'; Camara 77'; Viduka 89'	Stadium: Riverside Stadium; Attendance: 30,414; Referee: Neale Barry

15 September 2003 5	Leicester City	4–0	Leeds United	Leicester
19:30	Nalis 20'; Dickov 23', 83'; Scowcroft 90'	Report		Stadium: The Walkers Stadium; Attendance: 30,460; Referee: Jeff Winter

20 September 2003 6	Leeds United	0–2	Birmingham City	Leeds
15:00		Report	Savage 78' (pen.); Forssell 84'	Stadium: Elland Road; Attendance: 34,305; Referee: Dermot Gallagher

28 September 2003 7	Everton	4–0	Leeds United	Liverpool
15:00	Watson 27', 37', 52'; Ferguson 39'	Report		Stadium: Goodison Park; Attendance: 39,151; Referee: Paul Durkin

4 October 2003 8	Leeds United	2–1	Blackburn Rovers	Leeds
15:00	Johnson 11', 27'	Report	Baggio 86'	Stadium: Elland Road; Attendance: 35,039; Referee: Uriah Rennie

18 October 2003 9	Leeds United	0–1	Manchester United	Leeds
12:00		Report	Keane 81'	Stadium: Elland Road; Attendance: 40,153; Referee: Graham Poll

25 October 2003 10	Liverpool	3–1	Leeds United	Liverpool
15:00	Owen 35'; Murphy 57'; Sinama Pongolle 84'	Report	Smith 42'	Stadium: Anfield; Attendance: 43,599; Referee: Jeff Winter

1 November 2003 11	Leeds United	1–4	Arsenal	Leeds
15:00	Smith 64'	Report	Henry 8', 33'; Pires 17'; Gilberto Silva 50'	Stadium: Elland Road; Attendance: 36,491; Referee: Mike Dean

8 November 2003 12	Portsmouth	6–1	Leeds United	Portsmouth
15:30	Stefanovic 16'; O'Neil 45', 71'; Foxe 62'; Berger 75'; Yakubu 86'	Report	Smith 18'	Stadium: Fratton Park; Attendance: 20,112; Referee: Chris Foy

22 November 2003 13	Leeds United	0–2	Bolton Wanderers	Leeds
15:00		Report	Davies 16'; Giannakopoulos 17'	Stadium: Elland Road; Attendance: 36,558; Referee: Graham Poll

29 November 2003 14	Charlton Athletic	0–1	Leeds United	Greenwich
15:00		Report	Milner 9'	Stadium: The Valley; Attendance: 26,445; Referee: Mark Halsey

6 December 2003 15	Leeds United	1–1	Chelsea	Leeds
15:00	Pennant 18'	Report	Duff 70'	Stadium: Elland Road; Attendance: 36,305; Referee: Mike Dean

14 December 2003 16	Leeds United	3–2	Fulham	Leeds
16:00	Duberry 41'; Viduka 46'; Matteo 88'	Report	Saha 47', 86'	Stadium: Elland Road; Attendance: 30,544; Referee: Neale Barry

22 December 2003 17	Manchester City	1–1	Leeds United	Manchester
19:30	Sibierski 82'	Report	Viduka 24'	Stadium: City of Manchester Stadium; Attendance: 47,126; Referee: Graham Barber

26 December 2003 18	Leeds United	0–0	Aston Villa	Leeds
15:00		Report		Stadium: Elland Road; Attendance: 38,513; Referee: Steve Bennett

28 December 2003 19	Wolverhampton Wanderers	3–1	Leeds United	Wolverhampton
15:00	Smith 18' (o.g.); Iversen 48', 90'	Report	Duberry 3'	Stadium: Molineux; Attendance: 29,139; Referee: Andy D'Urso

7 January 2004 20	Newcastle United	1–0	Leeds United	Newcastle
19:45	Shearer 4'	Report		Stadium: St James' Park; Attendance: 52,130; Referee: Phil Dowd

10 January 2004 21	Leeds United	0–1	Tottenham Hotspur	Leeds
15:00		Report	Keane 56'	Stadium: Elland Road; Attendance: 35,365; Referee: Mark Halsey

17 January 2004 22	Southampton	2–1	Leeds United	Southampton
15:00	Ormerod 36'; Phillips 43'	Report	Kilgallon 75'	Stadium: St Mary's Stadium; Attendance: 31,976; Referee: Alan Wiley

31 January 2004 23	Leeds United	0–3	Middlesbrough	Leeds
15:00		Report	Zenden 53'; Job 77'; Ricketts 89' (pen.)	Stadium: Elland Road; Attendance: 35,970; Referee: Graham Poll

7 February 2004 24	Aston Villa	2–0	Leeds United	Birmingham
15:00	Ángel 45' (pen.); Johnsen 59'	Report		Stadium: Villa Park; Attendance: 39,171; Referee: Uriah Rennie

10 February 2004 25	Leeds United	4–1	Wolverhampton Wanderers	Leeds
19:45	Smith 14'; Matteo 41'; Milner 62'; Viduka 90'	Report	Ganea 21'	Stadium: Elland Road; Attendance: 36,867; Referee: Mike Dean

21 February 2004 26	Manchester United	1–1	Leeds United	Manchester
	Scholes 64'	Report	Smith 67'	Stadium: Old Trafford; Attendance: 67,744; Referee: Mark Halsey

29 February 2004 27	Leeds United	2–2	Liverpool	Leeds
14:00	Bakke 29'; Viduka 34'	Report	Kewell 21'; Baroš 42'	Stadium: Elland Road; Attendance: 39,932; Referee: Paul Durkin

13 March 2004 28	Fulham	2–0	Leeds United	Fulham
15:00	Davis 71'; Boa Morte 83'	Report		Stadium: Craven Cottage; Attendance: 17,104; Referee: Steve Dunn

22 March 2004 29	Leeds United	2–1	Manchester City	Leeds
19:45	McPhail 23'; Viduka 76' (pen.)	Report	Anelka 44'	Stadium: Elland Road; Attendance: 36,998; Referee: Alan Wiley

27 March 2004 30	Birmingham City	4–1	Leeds United	Birmingham
12:30	Hughes 12', 67'; Forssell 69', 82' (pen.)	Report	Viduka 3'	Stadium: St Andrew's; Attendance: 29,069; Referee: Mark Halsey

5 April 2004 31	Leeds United	3–2	Leicester City	Leeds
19:45	Duberry 11'; Viduka 13'; Smith 86'	Report	Dickov 77'; Izzet 79'	Stadium: Elland Road; Attendance: 34,036; Referee: Alan Wiley

10 April 2004 32	Blackburn Rovers	1–2	Leeds United	Blackburn
15:00	Short 90'	Report	Caldwell 2'; Viduka 89'	Stadium: Ewood Park; Attendance: 26,611; Referee: Steve Dunn

13 April 2004 33	Leeds United	1–1	Everton	Leeds
19:30	Milner 50'	Report	Rooney 13'	Stadium: Elland Road; Attendance: 39,835; Referee: Paul Durkin

16 April 2004 34	Arsenal	5–0	Leeds United	Holloway
20:00	Pires 6'; Henry 27', 33' (pen.), 50', 67'	Report		Stadium: Highbury; Attendance: 38,094; Referee: Dermot Gallagher

24 April 2004 35	Leeds United	1–2	Portsmouth	Leeds
15:00	Harte 83' (pen.)	Report	Yakubu 9'; LuaLua 51'	Stadium: Elland Road; Attendance: 39,273; Referee: Uriah Rennie

2 May 2004 36	Bolton Wanderers	4–1	Leeds United	Bolton
14:00	Djorkaeff 47', 53'; Harte 55' (o.g.); Nolan 78'	Report	Viduka 27' (pen.)	Stadium: Reebok Stadium; Attendance: 38,094; Referee: Steve Bennett

8 May 2004 37	Leeds United	3–3	Charlton Athletic	Leeds
15:00 BST	Kilgallon 29'; Pennant 41'; Smith 69' (pen.)	Report	Holland 11'; Euell 76' (pen.), 79'	Stadium: Elland Road; Attendance: 38,986; Referee: Mark Halsey

15 May 2004 38	Chelsea	1–0	Leeds United	Fulham
15:00 BST	Grønkjær 20'	Report		Stadium: Stamford Bridge; Attendance: 41,276; Referee: Mike Dean

=== FA Cup ===
4 January 2004 3	Leeds United	1–4	Arsenal	Leeds
	Viduka 8'	Report	Henry 26'; Edu 33'; Pires 87'; Touré 90'	Stadium: Elland Road; Attendance: 31,207; Referee: Rob Styles

=== League Cup ===
24 September 2003 2	Leeds United	2–2 (a.e.t.) (4–3 p)	Swindon Town	Leeds
	Harte 77'; Robinson 90'	Report	Guerney 44'; Parkin 74'	Stadium: Elland Road; Attendance: 29,211; Referee: Mark Clattenburg

28 October 2003 3	Leeds United	2–3 (a.e.t.)	Manchester United	Leeds
	Júnior 49', 114'	Report	Bellion 78'; Forlán 108'; Djemba-Djemba 117'	Stadium: Elland Road; Attendance: 37,546; Referee: Paul Durkin

== Statistics ==
No.	Pos.	Name	League		FA Cup		League Cup		Total		Discipline	
No.	Pos.	Name	Apps	Goals	Apps	Goals	Apps	Goals	Apps	Goals	Yellow card	Red card
2	DF	(Republic of Ireland) Gary Kelly	38	0	0	0	2	0	40	0	3	0
3	DF	(Republic of Ireland) Ian Harte	21+2	1	1	0	2	1	24+2	2	0	0
4	MF	(England) Jody Morris	11+1	0	0	0	0	0	11+1	0	2	0
5	DF	(South Africa) Lucas Radebe	11+3	0	0	0+1	0	0	11+4	0	2	0
6	DF	(France) Zoumana Camara	13	1	0	0	2	0	15	1	3	0
7	MF	(England) Nick Barmby	1+5	0	0	0	0	0	1+5	0	0	0
8	FW	(England) Michael Bridges	1+9	0	0	0	1+1	0	2+10	0	2	0
9	FW	(Australia) Mark Viduka	30	11	1	1	0	0	31	12	2	2
10	MF	(Senegal) Lamine Sakho	9+8	1	0+1	0	1	0	10+9	1	3	0
11	MF	(England) Jermaine Pennant	34+2	2	0	0	0	0	34+2	2	5	0
12	DF	(Brazil) Roque Júnior	5	0	0	0	2	2	7	2	1	1
13	GK	(England) Paul Robinson	36	0	1	0	2	1	40	1	1	1
14	MF	(Republic of Ireland) Stephen McPhail	8+4	1	0	0	0	0	8+4	0	2	0
15	FW	(France) Cyril Chapuis	0+1	0	0	0	1+1	0	1+2	0	0	0
15	DF	(Scotland) Steven Caldwell	13	1	0	0	0	0	13	1	3	0
16	MF	(England) Jason Wilcox	3+3	0	0	0	1	0	4+3	0	1	0
17	FW	(England) Alan Smith	35	9	1	0	2	0	38	9	6	0
19	MF	(Norway) Eirik Bakke	8+2	1	1	0	0	0	9+2	0	2	0
20	MF	(England) Seth Johnson	24+1	2	0	0	1	0	25+1	0	5	0
21	DF	(Scotland) Dominic Matteo	33	2	1	0	0	0	34	2	8	1
22	DF	(England) Michael Duberry	19	3	1	0	0	0	20	3	2	0
23	MF	(England) David Batty	10+2	0	1	0	1	0	13+2	0	5	0
24	MF	(Cameroon) Salomon Olembé	8+4	0	0	0	2	0	10+4	0	3	0
25	MF	(England) Aaron Lennon	0+11	0	0+1	0	1+1	0	0+14	0	0	0
29	DF	(France) Didier Domi	9+3	0	0	0	0+2	0	9+5	0	5	0
34	DF	(England) Frazer Richardson	2+2	0	1	0	0	0	3+2	0	0	0
36	DF	(England) Matthew Kilgallon	7+1	2	1	0	0	0	9+1	0	0	0
38	MF	(England) James Milner	27+3	3	1	0	1	0	29+3	0	2	0
39	FW	(England) Simon Johnson	1+4	0	0	0	0	0	1+4	0	0	0
40	GK	(England) Scott Carson	2+1	0	0	0	0	0	2+1	0	0	0

== Transfers ==
=== In ===
Date	Pos.	Name	From	Fee	Ref.
19 July 2003	MF	(England) Jody Morris	(England) Chelsea	Free	

=== Out ===
Date	Pos.	Name	From	Fee	Ref.
27 June 2003	DF	(Australia) Shane Cansdell-Sherriff	(Denmark) AGF Aarhus	Free	
30 June 2003	MF	(Australia) Jacob Burns	Released		
9 July 2003	FW	(Australia) Harry Kewell	(England) Liverpool	£5,000,000	
10 July 2003	MF	(France) Olivier Dacourt	(Italy) Roma	£3,500,000	
30 August 2003	DF	(Australia) Paul Okon	(Italy) Vicenza	Free	
1 September 2003	GK	(England) Nigel Martyn	(England) Everton	£500,000	
30 September 2003	GK	(Australia) Danny Milosevic	Released		
13 March 2004	MF	(England) Jody Morris	(England) Rotherham United	Free	

=== Loan in ===
Date from	Date to	Pos.	Name	From	Ref.
22 July 2003	30 June 2004	DF	(France) Zoumana Camara	(France) Lens	
5 August 2003	30 June 2004	DF	(France) Didier Domi	(France) Paris Saint-Germain	
12 August 2003	30 June 2004	FW	(Senegal) Lamine Sakho	(France) Marseille	
20 August 2003	30 June 2004	FW	(England) Jermaine Pennant	(England) Arsenal	
31 August 2003	30 June 2004	MF	(Cameroon) Salomon Olembé	(France) Marseille	
1 September 2003	1 December 2003	DF	(Brazil) Roque Júnior	(Italy) AC Milan	
1 September 2003	6 January 2004	FW	(France) Cyril Chapuis	(France) Marseille	
2 February 2004	30 June 2004	DF	(Scotland) Steven Caldwell	(England) Newcastle United	

=== Loan out ===
Date from	Date to	Pos.	Name	To	Ref.
31 July 2003	1 November 2003	MF	(England) Harpal Singh	(England) Bury	
21 August 2003	1 November 2003	DF	(England) Matthew Kilgallon	(England) West Ham United	
24 August 2003	30 June 2004	DF	(England) Danny Mills	(England) Middlesbrough	
26 August 2003	26 November 2003	MF	(Republic of Ireland) Stephen McPhail	(England) Nottingham Forest	
3 September 2003	2 October 2003	MF	(England) James Milner	(England) Swindon Town	
21 October 2003	30 June 2004	MF	(Republic of Ireland) Paul Keegan	(England) Scunthorpe United	
24 October 2003	24 January 2004	GK	(England) Shaun Allaway	(England) Walsall	
7 November 2003	10 December 2003	DF	(England) Frazer Richardson	(England) Stoke City	
13 December 2003	13 January 2004	MF	(England) Simon Johnson	(England) Blackpool	
7 January 2004	30 June 2004	MF	(Australia) Jamie McMaster	(England) Chesterfield	
2 February 2004	1 May 2004	FW	(England) Michael Bridges	(England) Newcastle United	
27 February 2004	27 March 2004	MF	(England) Nick Barmby	(England) Nottingham Forest	
