= Championship Manager: Season 97/98 =

1997 video game

- Developer(s): Sports Interactive
- Publisher(s): Eidos Interactive
- Designer(s): Paul Collyer, Oliver Collyer
- Series: Championship Manager
- Platform(s): PC
- Release: 31 October 1997
- Genre(s): Sports
- Mode(s): Single player, multiplayer

Championship Manager 97/98 is a game in the Championship Manager series of football management simulation video games. Based on the Championship Manager 2 game engine, it was developed by Sports Interactive and released in October 1997, exclusively for the PC, as the final game in the second generation of Championship Manager games.

== Gameplay ==
The gameplay remained very similar to other games based on Championship Manager 2 but offered far more than a simple database update. It was a clear indication of Sports Interactive's intent for the future of the franchise in two ways: the inclusion of a database editor with the game showed that Sports Interactive were actively encouraging users to modify and customise the game, and the inclusion of nine playable leagues from across Europe was a clear sign of things to come, in terms of the growing depth and global scope of the game.

The game featured nine playable league systems, three times more than in the previous version. It was also the first time ever that players could run more than one league concurrently (up to three in this edition). For example, the English, Spanish, and Italian leagues would all be simulated and players could manage a club in any of these nations and move between them. It also allowed the user to view results and league tables in these selected leagues, adding to the sense of realism. This was also the first time in the series that the Portuguese football league system had ever been a playable league.

Aside from the added playable leagues, bug fixes, and updated player data, there were also other new features in the game. Club squads could now contain 32 players (two more than the previous version), the UEFA Champions League and UEFA Cup formats were changed to reflect their real-life counterparts, added control over tactics (including selection of set-piece takers) and international under-21 matches were now simulated fully.

== Playable leagues ==
=== Europe ===
Nation	Levels	Divisions
Belgium	2	2
England	4	4
France	2	2
Germany	2	2
Holland	2	2
Italy	2	2
Portugal	2	2
Scotland	4	4
Spain	2	2

- This was the first time in the series that the Portuguese league system had ever been a playable league.

=== Data editor and updates ===
Ever since the first game in the series, players had been trying with varying degrees of success to find a way of editing the data within Championship Manager, either to cheat or simply to add themselves as a player in the Championship Manager world. With this version, Sports Interactive included an editor that allowed users to do this and much more.

== Notable players ==
There were many notable players within the game who gained cult status for their high abilities and potential, which often contrasted with their real life abilities. Some of them (e.g. Ibrahima Bakayoko) were really wonderkids at that time but did not eventually evolve into world class players, whilst some others were already mature players of minor league clubs (i.e. Bjørn Heidenstrøm) with inexplicably high abilities within the game.

- Tom Youngs a FRLC for Cambridge United.
- Martin Knudsen a FRC for Viking FK.
- Wilson Oruma, a Nigerian MC for RC Lens.
- Ibrahima Bakayoko, an Ivory Coast AM/FC for Montpellier HSC.
- Anthony Betterton, a GK available as a Schoolboy.
- Stian Neset, a Norwegian SC for Sogndal Fotball.
- Karl Oskar Fjørtoft, a Norwegian MRC for Molde FK
- Martin Lauchlan, DMLC for Partick Thistle F.C.
- John Ritchie, SC for Partick Thistle F.C.
- Alex Martin, SC for Partick Thistle F.C.
- Robert Dunn, M/SC for Partick Thistle F.C.
- Billy MacDonald, DMC for Partick Thistle F.C.
- Geirmund Brendesæter, WBR for SK Brann
- Graeme Tomlinson, FC available on a free transfer.
- Jesper Ljung, a Swedish AM/FC for Helsingborgs IF
- Francisco Viveros, a Chilean SC for Sporting CP
- Tommy Svindal Larsen, a Norwegian MLC for Stabaek
- John Curtis, DC for Manchester United F.C.
- Andrew Duncan, DC for Manchester United F.C. who often appears on a free transfer.
- Erik Nevland, a Norwegian FC for Manchester United F.C. who often appears on a free transfer
- Teddy Lucic, a Swedish DC for IFK Göteborg.
- Marc Emmers, a Belgium MC available on a free transfer
- Bjørn Heidenstrøm, a Norwegian D/MC for Leyton Orient F.C.
- Rubén Ruiz Díaz, a Paraguayan GK for C.F. Monterrey
- Trevor Steven AMRC available on a free transfer
- Dalian Atkinson FC available on a free transfer
- Chris Kiwomya SC available on a free transfer
- Ilya Tsymbalar, a Russian DMRL for FC Spartak Moscow
- Eber Moas, an Uruguayan CB.
- Arnór Guðjohnsen, AMC an Icelandic available on a free transfer or playing for Örebro SK
- Todi Jónsson, SC a Faroese playing for F.C. Copenhagen
- Viktor Onopko, DC a Russian playing for Real Oviedo

== Sales ==
Championship Manager 97/98 was the top selling PC game of 1997 in the UK, despite Sports Interactive encouraging game-sharing by not including any CD-protection. The game could be installed on any number of PCs without needing a copy of the CD to play it, which indicates that it was most likely even more popular than it seemed. SI have since said that this move was to gain as much exposure from the Championship Manager 2 series as possible before the release of the Championship Manager 3 series.
