= Brahim Hemdani =

Algerian footballer (born 1978)

Personal information
- Full name: Ibrahim Hemdani
- Date of birth: 15 March 1978 (age 48)
- Place of birth: Colombes, France
- Height: 1.80 m (5 ft 11 in)
- Position: Defensive midfielder

Team information
- Current team: Algeria (manager)

Youth career
- 1992–1997: Racing Paris

Senior career*
Years	Team	Apps	(Gls)
1995–1997	Racing Paris	44	(3)
1997–1998	Cannes	27	(1)
1998–2001	Strasbourg	53	(3)
2001–2005	Marseille	95	(2)
2005–2009	Rangers	67	(2)
Total		286	(10)

International career
2008–2009	Algeria	2	(0)

Managerial career
- 2017–2020: Côte Bleue (assistant)
- 2020–2022: Courbevoie
- 2022–2025: Marignane GCB
- 2026: Algeria U20
- 2026: Algeria U21
- 2026–: Algeria
- * Club domestic league appearances and goals

Brahim Hemdani (born 15 March 1978) is an Algerian professional football manager and former footballer who played as a defensive midfielder. He is the current manager of the Algeria national team.

== Club career ==
Hemdani was born in Colombes, Hauts-de-Seine. He started his career with Cannes, where he spent two seasons. He later transferred to RC Strasbourg Alsace, spending three seasons with the club. He then joined Marseille, which he helped reach the UEFA Cup final in 2004.

Hemdani then joined Rangers on 14 June 2005 on a Bosman transfer and signed a four-year contract. He suffered from injury problems during his first season, waiting until late October to make his debut against Dundee United. Hemdani was a regular in the side from then on and helped the club reach the last 16 of the Champions League for the first time in their history. The season ended with the side finishing third in the league and trophyless. The following summer, Paul Le Guen took over as manager and Hemdani began the 2006–07 season in midfield but was moved to the centre of defence.

Hemdani scored his first goal for Rangers midway through that season, a shot from outside the box to equalise in the 88th minute of an Old Firm game on 17 December 2006. His second goal came in similar circumstances in a UEFA Cup match in March 2007, against CA Osasuna, scoring to equalise in injury time.

On 16 April 2007, Hemdani was named Rangers Player of the Year at an award ceremony, voted for by the club's fans. He made his 100th appearance for Rangers on 13 March 2008 in a UEFA Cup match against Werder Bremen, the club went on to reach the final that season, which Hemdani played the full 90 minutes of. However, this turned out to be his last match for Rangers as the 2008–09 season saw Hemdani frozen out of the first team. He left on 1 June 2009 having made 108 appearances and scoring twice.

== International career ==
Hemdani declined the chance to be included as part of the Algeria national squad on several occasions in the past. However, in February 2008 he had a change of heart and decided to play for Algeria. Hemdani made his Algerian debut in a 2010 World Cup qualifier against Senegal on 31 May 2008.

== Personal life ==
Hemdani's family are originally from Larbaâ Nath Irathen, near Tizi Ouzou, in the Kabylie region of Algeria and he spends a significant amount of time there every year.

== Career statistics ==
=== Club ===
Club	Season	League			Cup (Note: Includes Coupe de France, Coupe de la Ligue, Scottish League Cup and Scottish Cup)		Continental		Other		Total	
Club	Season	Division	Apps	Goals	Apps	Goals	Apps	Goals	Apps	Goals	Apps	Goals
Racing Paris	1995–96	National 2	10	3			—		—		10	3
Racing Paris	1996–97	National 2	34	0			—		—		34	0
Racing Paris	Total		44	3			—		—		44	3
Cannes	1997–98	Division 1	20	1	4	0	—		—		24	1
Cannes	1998–99	Division 1	7	0	0	0	—		—		7	0
Cannes	Total		27	1	4	0	—		—		31	1
Strasbourg	1998–99	Division 1	12	0	0	0	—		—		12	0
Strasbourg	1999–00	Division 1	29	3	7	1	—		—		36	4
Strasbourg	2000–01	Division 1	12	0	1	0	—		—		13	0
Strasbourg	Total		53	3	8	1	—		—		61	4
Marseille	2000–01	Division 1	8	0	1	0	—		—		9	0
Marseille	2001–02	Division 1	11	0	0	0	—		—		11	0
Marseille	2002–03	Ligue 1	35	1	5	0	—		—		40	1
Marseille	2003–04	Ligue 1	30	1	3	0	17 (Note: eight appearances in UEFA Champions League, nine appearances in UEFA Cup)	0	—		50	1
Marseille	2004–05	Ligue 1	11	0	1	0	—		—		12	0
Marseille	Total		95	2	10	0	17	0	—		124	2
Rangers	2005–06	Premier League	19	0	0	0	5 (Note: All appearance(s) in UEFA Champions League)	0	—		24	0
Rangers	2006–07	Premier League	36	1	3	0	10 (Note: All appearance(s) in UEFA Cup)	1	—		49	2
Rangers	2007–08	Premier League	12	0	5	0	18 (Note: nine appearances in UEFA Champions League, nine appearances in UEFA Cup)	0	—		35	0
Rangers	2008–09	Premier League	0	0	0	0	—		—		0	0
Rangers	Total		67	1	8	0	33	1	—		108	2
Career total			286	10	31	1	50	1	0	0	323	9

== Honours ==
Rangers

- Scottish League Cup: 2008
- Scottish Cup: 2008, 2009
- Scottish first-tier League Championships: 2009
- UEFA Cup Final Runners up: 2007–08

Marseille

- UEFA Cup Final Runners up: 2003–04

== Individual ==
- Rangers F.C. Player of the Year: 2007
