= Ryan Bakayoko =

French association footballer (born 2002)

Personal information
- Full name: Ibrahima Ryan Bakayoko
- Date of birth: 13 February 2002 (age 24)
- Place of birth: Montpellier, France
- Height: 1.96 m (6 ft 5 in)
- Position: Forward

Youth career
- 2008–2015: Montpellier
- 2015–2017: Castelnau Le Crès
- 2017–2019: Nîmes

Senior career*
Years	Team	Apps	(Gls)
2019–2021	Nîmes II	1	(0)
2021–2022	Montpellier II	25	(9)
2022–2024	Niort	36	(1)
2022–2024	Niort II	11	(8)
2024–2025	Sabadell	19	(3)
- * Club domestic league appearances and goals as of 26 June 2025

Ibrahima Ryan Bakayoko (born 13 February 2002) is a French professional footballer who plays as a forward.

== Career ==
A youth product of Montpellier, Castelnau Le Crès, and Nîmes, Bakayoko began his senior career with the reserves of Nîmes in 2019. He returned to Montpellier on 20 June 2020 and was assigned to their reserves. Scoring 9 goals in 25 games with Montpellier II, he transferred to Niort in the Ligue 2 on 21 May 2022. He made his professional debut with Niort in a 1–0 Ligue 2 win over FC Annecy on 30 July 2022, coming on as a sub in the 85th minute.

== Personal life ==
Bakayoko is the nephew of the retired Ivorian footballer Ibrahima Bakayoko.
