= Farid Talhaoui =

Moroccan footballer (born 1982)

Personal information
- Full name: Farid Talhaoui
- Date of birth: 10 February 1982 (age 44)
- Place of birth: Angers, France
- Height: 1.70 m (5 ft 7 in)
- Position: Midfielder

Youth career
- 1998–2002: Guingamp

Senior career*
| Years | Team | Apps | (Gls) |
| 2002–2008 | Guingamp | 53 | (4) |
| 2007 | → FC Lorient (loan) | 1 | (0) |
| 2008–2012 | Wydad Casablanca | | |
| 2012–2013 | Lyon Duchère | 2 | (0) |
| 2013–2014 | OC Khouribga | | |
| 2014–2018 | Lyon Duchère | | |
| 2018–2019 | Saint-Pierroise | | |
| 2019–2020 | Vénissieux | | |
| 2020–2021 | Ménival | | |

International career
| 2004 | Morocco U-23 | 3 | (0) |
- * Club domestic league appearances and goals

Farid Talhaoui (born 10 February 1982) is a Moroccan footballer.

== International career ==
He was part of the Moroccan 2004 Olympic football team, who exited in the first round, finishing third in group D, behind group winners Iraq and runners-up Costa Rica.
