= Stian Neset =

Norwegian footballer (born 1974)

Personal information
- Date of birth: 14 April 1974 (age 52)
- Place of birth: Norway
- Position: Midfielder

Senior career*
Years	Team	Apps	(Gls)
-1998	Sogndal Fotball	6	(0)
-2000	FK Vidar		
- Løv-Ham Fotball
- Dale IL
- * Club domestic league appearances and goals

Stian Neset (born 14 April 1974) is a Norwegian retired footballer.

== Career ==
Neset made 6 appearances for Sogndal Fotball in the Norwegian top flight before spending the rest of his career in the Norwegian lower leagues.

Despite playing in the Norwegian lower leagues for the majority of his career, Neset was known on the video game Championship Manager: Season 97/98 for his potential.
