= Michel Gafour =

French footballer (born 1982)

Personal information
- Date of birth: 25 March 1982 (age 44)
- Place of birth: Toulon, France
- Height: 1.67 m (5 ft 6 in)
- Position: Midfielder

Youth career
- Sporting Toulon Var

Senior career*
Years	Team	Apps	(Gls)
1997–2003	Olympique de Marseille	5	(0)
2003–2004	AS Cannes	28	(1)
2005–2006	Sporting Toulon Var	22	(2)
2006–2007	SO Cassis Carnoux	16	(2)
2007–2008	Consolat Marseille		
2008	Le Touquet FC		
2008–2009	Liberia Mia	9	(0)
2009–2011	SC Toulon-Le Las		

International career
2000	France U18	3	(0)
- * Club domestic league appearances and goals as of October 20, 2008

Michel Gafour (born 25 March 1982) is a French professional football midfielder who last played for SC Toulon-Le Las in the French amateur leagues. He had a spell with Liberia Mia in the Primera Division de Costa Rica.

== Career ==
Born in Toulon, Gafour made five Ligue 1 appearances for Olympique Marseille before joining AS Cannes. Cannes released him after one season, and he trained with Cambridge United F.C. in 2004.

Gafour played for the French youth national team in 2000.
