= Nicolas Cicut =

French footballer (born 1983)

Personal information
- Date of birth: 28 September 1983 (age 43)
- Place of birth: Avignon, France
- Height: 1.86 m (6 ft 1 in)
- Position: Forward

Senior career*
Years	Team	Apps	(Gls)
2001–2003	Marseille B		
2003–2004	Marseille	0	(0)
2004–2006	Gazélec Ajaccio		
2006–2007	AS Cherbourg		
2007–2008	Moulins		
- * Club domestic league appearances and goals

Nicolas Cicut (born 28 September 1983) is a French former professional footballer who played as a forward for Olympique de Marseille, Gazelec Ajaccio, AS Moulins, and AS Cherbourg Football.
