= Bjørn Heidenstrøm =

Norwegian footballer (born 1968)

Personal information
- Full name: Bjørn Olav Heidenstrøm
- Date of birth: 15 January 1968 (age 58)
- Place of birth: Porsgrunn, Norway
- Position: Midfielder

Youth career
- Herøya

Senior career*
Years	Team	Apps	(Gls)
- Odd Grenland
- Lillestrøm
- Sogndal
- Drøbak/Frogn
- Bærum
1996–1997	Leyton Orient	4	(0)
- Tollnes
- Urædd
- Herøya

International career
1984	Norway U15	2	(0)
1983–1984	Norway U16	4	(0)
1985	Norway U19	1	(0)
- * Club domestic league appearances and goals

Bjørn Olav Heidenstrøm (born 15 January 1968) is a Norwegian former professional footballer who played as a midfielder. He represented Norway internationally at youth levels U15, U16 and U19.

After the end of his professional career, he worked administratively for the football club Vålerenga. He also attained fame after being featured in several iterations of Championship Manager, a football-management simulation video game series.

In June 2009, Heidenstrøm embarked on a journey by bicycle from Norway to Cape Town, South Africa, to raise awareness for the plight of refugees. Along the way he collected football shirts, which were stitched together to form a huge football shirt that was unveiled at the 2010 FIFA World Cup in South Africa in June 2010.
