= Christophe Dussart =

French football defender (born 1976)

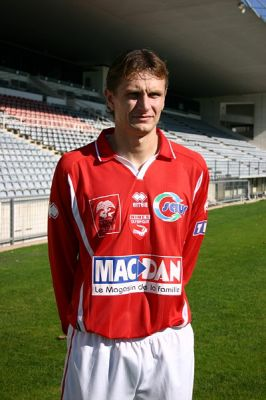

Personal information
- Full name: Christophe Dussart
- Date of birth: 15 April 1976 (age 50)
- Place of birth: Valenciennes, France
- Height: 1.80 m (5 ft 11 in)
- Position: Defender

College career
| Years | Team | Apps | (Gls) |
| 1994-1996 | US Valenciennes-Anzin | | |
| 1996-2000 | Valenciennes FC | 29 | (1) |

Senior career*
| Years | Team | Apps | (Gls) |
| 2000-2001 | Clermont Foot | 20 | (1) |
| 2001-2003 | FC Gueugnon | 62 | |
| 2003-2005 | SCO Angers | 67 | (2) |
| 2005-2008 | Nîmes Olympique | 64 | (6) |
| Total | | 213 | (9) |
- * Club domestic league appearances and goals

Christophe Dussart (born 15 April 1976) is a former French football defender. He played for several years in the second division of the French football league system.

== Sports career ==
Mssr. Dussart began playing for his hometown's third-league semi professional team, then called US Valenciennes-Anzin, in 1994. He continued with the team when it changed its name to Valenciennes FC and stayed with them until 2000. That year he joined semi professional Clermont Foot, staying with them for only a year. He was traded up and spent the next four years in the lower of the two professional leagues. From 2001 to 2003, he played with FC Gueugnon. SCO Angers was his next professional home, again for two years. After this he was traded back down to the third league and played from 2005 to 2008 with Nîmes Olympique. In 2008 he was traded further down to the regional, amateur, sixth tier team Saint-Amand FC where he stayed until 2010. That year he went to the local municipal team in Raismes, AS Raismes Vicoigne, playing with them for a year. He then coached that team from 2012 until 2017.

=== Ranking of teams featuring Mssr Dussart ===
- 1994/95 US Valenciennes-Anzin Championnat National, ranked 15th of 18.
- 1995/96 US Valenciennes-Anzin Championnat National, ranked 3rd of 17.
- 1996/97 Valenciennes FC Championnat National 2, League ranked 4th of 18
- 1997/98 Valenciennes FC Championnat National 2, League ranked 1st of 18
- 1998/99 Valenciennes FC Championnat National, ranked fifth of 19
- 1999/00 Valenciennes FC Championnat National, ranked fifth of 20
- 2000/01 Clermont Foot Championnat National, ranked fourth of 20
- 2001/02 FC Gueugnon Ligue 2, 10th rank
- 2002/03 FC Gueugnon Ligue 2, 14th rank
- 2003/04 Angers SCO Ligue 2, 13th rank
- 2004/05 Angers SCO Ligue 2, 19th rank
- 2005/06 Nîmes Olympique Championnat National, ranked sixth
- 2006/07 Nîmes Olympique Championnat National, ranked fifth
- 2007/08 Nîmes Olympique Championnat National, ranked third
- 2008/09 Saint-Amand FC Division d'Honneur, ranked fourth
- 2009/10 Saint-Amand FC Division d'Honneur, ranked tenth
- 2010/11 AS Raismes Vicoigne Division d'Honneur Regionel

=== Coaching career ===
- 2012/13
  - Won against Bondues FC
  - Lost against Racing Club de France Colombes 92
- 2013/14 Lost championship match against SENIORS A - DHR

== Post-sports career ==
In January 2022, Mssr. Dussart registered with the French government as an individual freelance entrepreneur in real estate rentals.
