= Fabien Laurenti =

French footballer (born 1983)

Personal information
- Date of birth: 6 January 1983 (age 43)
- Place of birth: Marseille, France
- Height: 1.81 m (5 ft 11 in)
- Position: Defender

Youth career
- 1992–2001: Marseille

Senior career*
| Years | Team | Apps | (Gls) |
| 2001–2004 | Marseille | 16 | (0) |
| 2004–2007 | Ajaccio | 106 | (0) |
| 2007–2010 | Lens | 50 | (1) |
| 2010 | → Brest (loan) | 0 | (0) |
| 2010–2012 | Arles-Avignon | 38 | (0) |
| Total | | 210 | (1) |

International career
| 2003–2004 | France U21 | 3 | (0) |
- * Club domestic league appearances and goals

Fabien Laurenti (born 6 January 1983) is a French former professional footballer who played as a defender.

== Career ==
Born in Marseille, Laurenti began his career at Olympique de Marseille. Limited playing time there inspired a move in 2004 to AC Ajaccio, where he made over 100 appearances. In the summer of 2007, he left Ajaccio for RC Lens. On 8 January 2010, Ligue 2 club Stade Brestois 29 signed Laurenti on loan until June 2010 from Lens.

Between 2003 and 2004, he made three appearances for the France U21 team.
