= Delfim Teixeira =

Portuguese footballer (born 1977)

Delfim
Personal information
- Full name: Delfim José Fernandes Rola Teixeira
- Date of birth: 5 February 1977 (age 49)
- Place of birth: Amarante, Portugal
- Height: 1.79 m (5 ft 10 in)
- Position: Defensive midfielder

Youth career
- 1987–1992: Amarante
- 1992–1996: Boavista

Senior career*
Years	Team	Apps	(Gls)
1996–1998	Boavista	16	(1)
1996–1997	→ Aves (loan)	29	(3)
1998–2001	Sporting CP	58	(7)
2001–2006	Marseille	33	(1)
2005	→ Moreirense (loan)	7	(0)
2006	Young Boys	10	(0)
2007–2008	Naval	32	(1)
2008–2009	Trofense	20	(0)
Total		205	(13)

International career
1994	Portugal U17	3	(0)
1994	Portugal U18	1	(0)
1996–1998	Portugal U20	14	(4)
1997–1999	Portugal U21	15	(4)
2001	Portugal B	1	(0)
2000	Portugal	1	(0)
- * Club domestic league appearances and goals

Delfim José Fernandes Rola Teixeira (born 5 February 1977), known simply as Delfim, is a Portuguese former professional footballer who played as a defensive midfielder.

In a career marred by injury problems, he amassed Primeira Liga totals of 133 games and nine goals over as many seasons, in representation of five clubs. The owner of a powerful shot, he also competed in France and Switzerland.

== Club career ==
Delfim was born in Amarante, Porto District. After making his Primeira Liga debut aged 19 with Boavista F.C. he signed for Sporting CP, being an essential midfield player alongside Aldo Duscher in the latter club's 1999–2000 league conquest, after an 18-year drought.

In 2001, Delfim moved to Olympique de Marseille in France, but also began an excruciating battle with injuries, appearing very rarely for the Ligue 1 side and almost retiring from football. In January 2002 he was reunited with former Sporting teammate Dimas and, after an unassuming stint with BSC Young Boys, eventually returned to Portugal.

Delfim was able to revive his career in the 2007–08 season, being very important as Associação Naval 1º de Maio retained their status in the main division; on 27 April 2008, his long-distance shot was the only goal of the home fixture against his former employers Boavista. For the following campaign he joined top-tier newcomers C.D. Trofense, retiring at the age of 32 after his team suffered relegation.

== International career ==
Delfim earned his only full cap for Portugal on 15 November 2000, playing the entire 2–1 friendly win over Israel in Braga.

== Honours ==
Boavista

- Supertaça Cândido de Oliveira: 1997

Sporting CP

- Primeira Liga: 1999–2000

Marseille

- UEFA Intertoto Cup: 2005
