= Daniel Van Buyten =

Belgian association football player (born 1978)

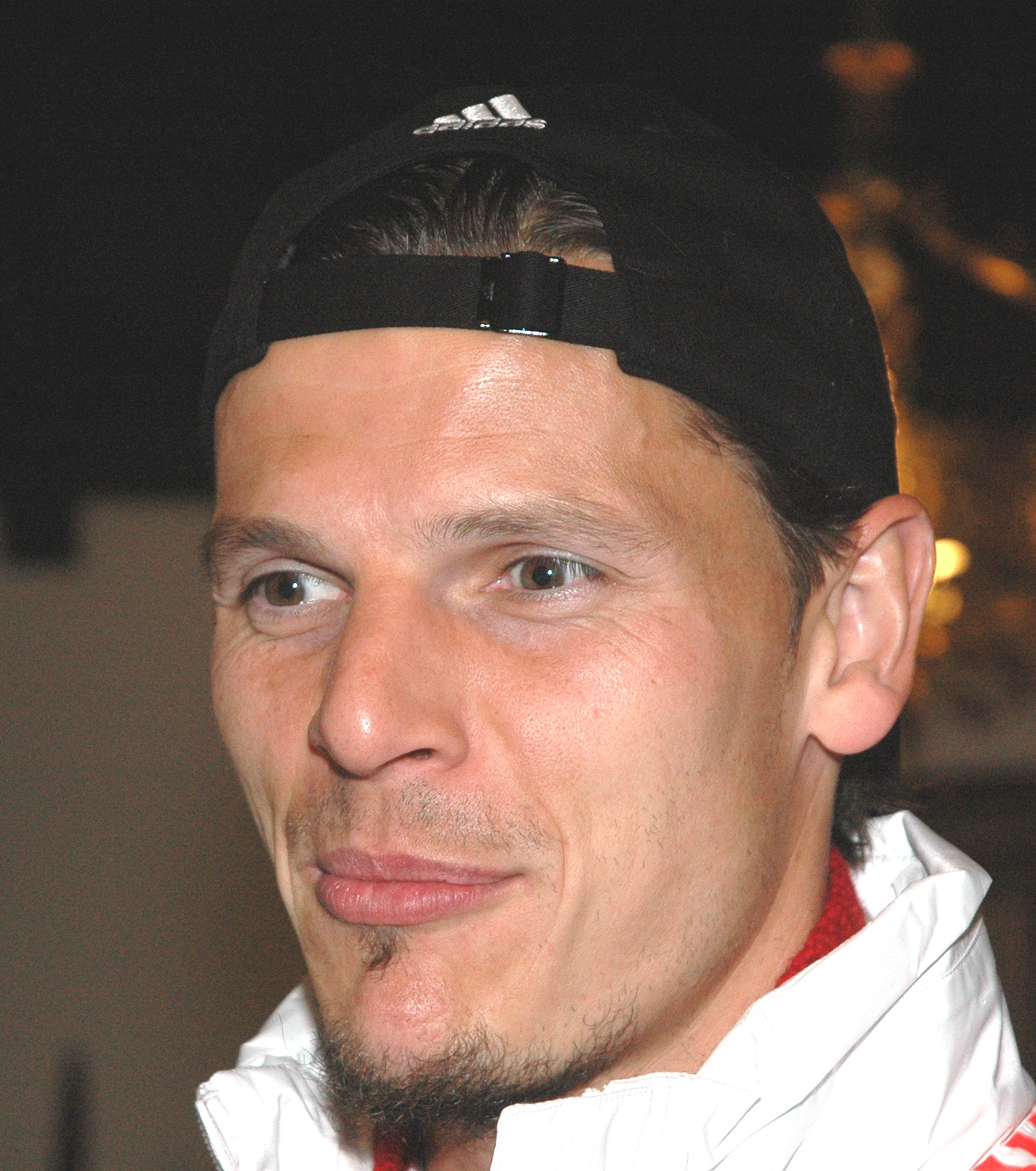
- Van Buyten in 2013

Personal information
- Full name: Daniel Van Buyten
- Date of birth: 7 February 1978 (age 48)
- Place of birth: Chimay, Belgium
- Height: 1.97 m (6 ft 6 in)
- Position: Centre back

Youth career
- 1986–1988: JS Froidchapelle
- 1988–1989: JSG Lammetal
- 1989–1991: JS Froidchapelle
- 1991–1993: Olympic Charleroi
- 1993–1994: UBS Auvelais
- 1994–1997: FC Somzée
- 1997–1998: Charleroi

Senior career*
Years	Team	Apps	(Gls)
1998–1999	Charleroi	19	(1)
1999–2001	Standard Liège	57	(7)
2001–2004	Marseille	76	(12)
2004	→ Manchester City (loan)	5	(0)
2004–2006	Hamburger SV	61	(7)
2006–2014	Bayern Munich	158	(20)
2010–2011	Bayern Munich II	2	(0)
Total		378	(47)

International career
2000	Belgium U18	1	(0)
1999	Belgium U21	6	(1)
2001–2014	Belgium	83	(10)
- * Club domestic league appearances and goals

Daniel Van Buyten (Dutch pronunciation: [ˈdaːnijɛl vɑm ˈbœytə(n)]; (Note: In isolation, van is pronounced [vɑn].) born 7 February 1978) is a Belgian former footballer who played as a centre back. Nicknamed "Big Dan", Van Buyten was known for his uncompromising style of play, exploiting both his physical strength and aerial ability.

Beginning at Charleroi as a striker, Van Buyten's career took off when he converted to a centre back, playing for a series of top flight clubs, including Marseille, Manchester City, Hamburger SV and Bayern Munich. Throughout his career, Van Buyten was also a regular starter for the Belgium national team, amassing 83 caps in an international career that spanned 13 years and which included participation at two FIFA World Cups.

Van Buyten became the first-ever Belgian winner of the UEFA Champions League when Bayern Munich claimed the European crown in 2013.

== Club career ==
=== Early career ===
Van Buyten joined Olympique de Marseille in the summer of 2001, leaving Belgian side Standard Liège with whom he had been with since 1999. After two-and-a-half productive seasons with the club, on 31 January 2004 Van Buyten agreed to a short-term loan agreement with Manchester City, signing for the Premier League club until the end of the season. He proved to be a success in his half-season loan deal at the club, garnering praise from his manager, specifically in his performance against Chelsea. But former manager Kevin Keegan conceded that, "I don't think we will keep him at the end of the season as I feel he will go to a big club then."

Van Buyten returned to Marseille at the end of his loan agreement and was signed by Bundesliga club Hamburger SV in June 2004 to replace outgoing captain Nico-Jan Hoogma, agreeing to a four-year deal with the German side. For Hamburg he made 61 German top-flight appearances.

=== Bayern Munich ===
In June 2006, Bayern Munich announced that they had acquired Van Buyten from Hamburg and had signed him to a contract lasting through the 2009–10 season. Van Buyten had a highly successful first season at the Bavarian club, forming an effective centre-back partnership with Lúcio. Van Buyten scored his first goal for Bayern against Energie Cottbus on 9 December 2006, scoring the game-winning goal of a 2–1 victory for Die Roten. Van Buyten then scored his second goal for the club on 26 January 2007, levelling the sides at 1–1 but Bayern fell to Borussia Dortmund by a score of 3–2.

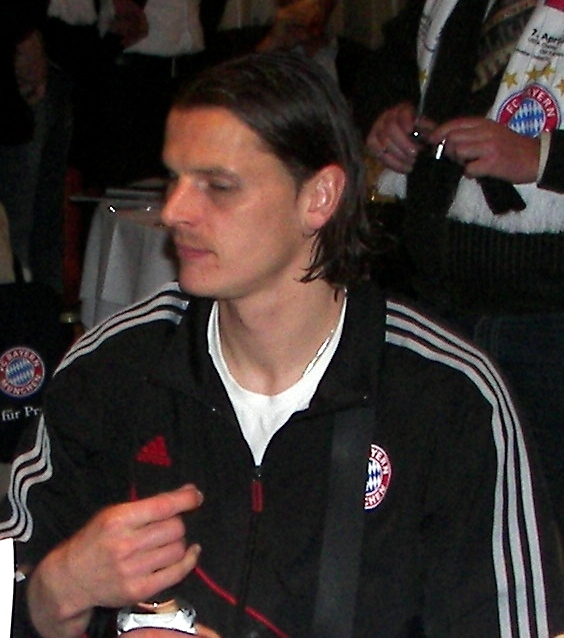
Van Buyten with Bayern Munich in 2010

Arguably Van Buyten's most valuable contribution in his debut season, however, came against Milan on 3 April 2007, in the first-leg of the UEFA Champions League quarter-final. Van Buyten scored two away goals to level the match and give Bayern Munich the advantage in the tie. In the quarter-final encounter against Milan, he scored twice with his left foot, once in the 78th minute to take Bayern to 1–1 and then he scored a stoppage time half-volley.

On 4 February 2010, Bayern Munich announced that Van Buyten had signed a new contract that would keep him at the club until 2012. During the second half of the 2010–11 season, Van Buyten was mostly relegated to bench player status, but recovered his starting spot towards the end of the season. He was part of the squad that blitzed FC St. Pauli on 11 May 2011, netting a goal in an 8–1 victory that condemned the Hamburg-based side to relegation to the 2. Bundesliga.

On 17 December 2011, in the match between Bayern Munich and 1. FC Köln, Van Buyten struck a free-kick so hard that the ball burst. On 30 April 2012, Van Buyten signed a one-year extension with Bayern Munich.

Despite the arrival of centre-back Dante from Borussia Mönchengladbach in the summer of 2012, Van Buyten became an integral member of the back-line for the Bavarians during the 2012–13 campaign, part of a three-man rotation in the centre of defense with Dante and Jérôme Boateng. On 6 April 2013, with a 1–0 defeat of Eintracht Frankfurt thanks to a goal from Bastian Schweinsteiger, Van Buyten celebrated his third Bundesliga championship with Bayern, clinching the club's 23rd national title. Van Buyten played the full 90 minutes in the club's 3–0 second leg semi-final victory over Spanish champions Barcelona on 1 May, clinching a resounding 7–0 aggregate victory and a place in the Champions League final against fellow Bundesliga side Borussia Dortmund. Van Buyten is the first Belgian player in a Champions League final.

After heavily been linked with big spenders Monaco, Van Buyten signed a further contract extension with Bayern Munich on a one-year rolling contract. Having been a part member of the squad under manager Pep Guardiola, and despite scoring against Werder Bremen, Van Buyten was rumored to join 1. FC Köln on a pre-contract agreement, though this was denied by a club official. After the end of the season, the club did not renew his contract, leaving him a free agent to sign with another club. Belgian Pro League club Anderlecht offered him a two-year contract in August 2014, but he rejected it, stating that he had retired from competitive football.

== International career ==
Van Buyten was called up to the national team in 2001 and received his first cap for Belgium on 28 February 2001 against San Marino in a 2002 FIFA World Cup qualifying match, starting in a 10–1 thrashing of the nation. His first goal for the national team came in just his second cap, heading home the equalizing goal in a 2–2 draw with Scotland on 24 March 2001, earning a crucial point for ten-man Belgium in World Cup qualifying.

After good performances with Marseille in France, the young defender was included in the 23-man roster for the 2002 World Cup in South Korea and Japan. He played the full game in Belgium's opening match of the tournament, a 2–2 draw with co-hosts Japan on 4 June. In the second group match, Belgium stuttered to a surprising 1–1 draw with Tunisia on 10 June while Van Buyten booked for the Belgians. Van Buyten helped Belgium pick up their first win of the tournament and in doing so progression to the knockout stage, stopping a late flurry from Russia to secure a 3–2 victory. Finishing as runners-up in the group, Belgium were dealt a tough draw with four-time champions Brazil. Despite a valiant effort, Van Buyten and the Belgians bowed out in the round of 16 as the duo of Rivaldo and Ronaldo led Brazil to a 2–0 win. The South Americans would eventually be crowned champions with a defeat of Germany in the final on 30 June by the same scoreline.

Following Belgium's impressive display at the World Cup in Japan and South Korea, much was expected of the small nation in the qualifying phase of the UEFA Euro 2004 tournament and the country was placed in Pot A amongst the best teams in the European federation. Van Buyten played in all eight qualifying games for the national team but Belgium failed to make it to the final tournament, missing out on second spot in the group to Croatia on the head-to-head rule.

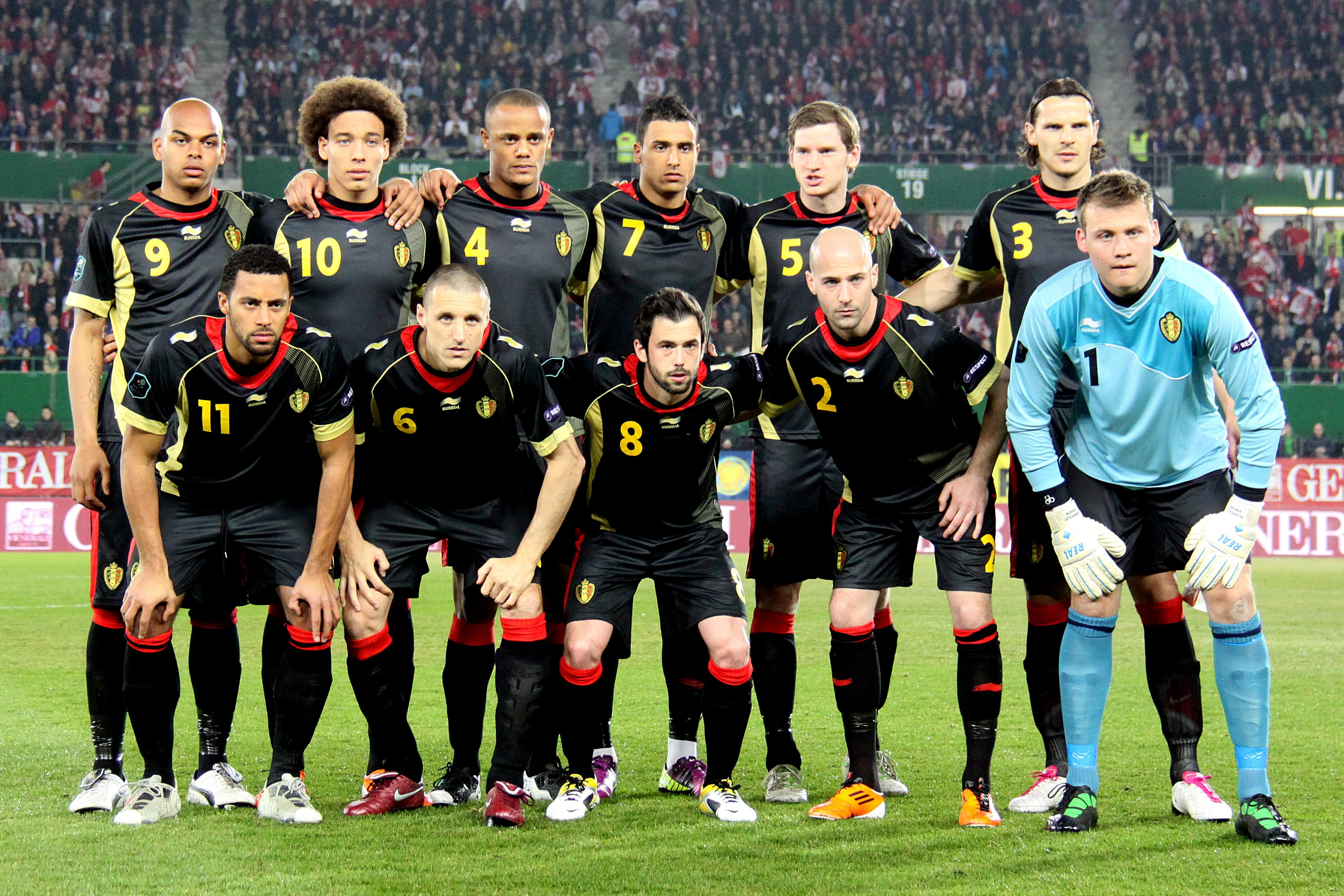
Van Buyten, top right, with the national team against Austria in 2011

On 11 February 2009, he scored a rare double as the Belgians sunk Slovenia 2–0 in a friendly match. Seven months later, on 9 September, Van Buyten notched Belgium's only goal as Belgium slumped to a disappointing 2–1 defeat to lowly Armenia in FIFA World Cup qualifying. The loss meant that Belgium lost any hope of qualifying for the 2010 World Cup in South Africa, with head coach Franky Vercauteren resigning minutes after final whistle.

For Euro 2012 qualification, Belgium were placed in Group A with the likes of Germany, Turkey and Austria. The defender netted a brace away to Turkey on 7 September 2010, but despite his best efforts, Belgium fell to a 3–2 loss as captain Vincent Kompany was sent off for two bookable offenses.

Van Buyten was once again an integral member for the Belgians in yet another qualifying campaign, featuring in seven of the ten qualifying matches for the country. Belgium narrowly missed out in qualifying for the playoff-round, finishing two points behind Turkey with a 3–1 loss to Germany in the final qualifying round game on 11 October 2011.

In 2014 World Cup qualifying, the veteran defender made five appearances as Belgium reached its first tournament in 12 years.

On 13 May 2014, Van Buyten was named in Belgium's squad for the 2014 World Cup, in Brazil. He was the only player in the squad who had played at a major tournament before. At the age of 36, him and goalkeeper Thibaut Courtois were the only Belgian players to play every minute of every match until they were defeated by Argentina in the quarter-finals.

== Personal life ==
Van Buyten's father, Franz, was a popular Belgian catcher/wrestler in Europe from 1960 to 1980. His mother, Renate, is German.

=== Bank theft incident ===
While he was with Manchester City, he, along with players Djamel Belmadi and Matías Vuoso, were the victims of theft perpetrated by two bankers. In January 2006, the bank workers, Paul Sherwood, a cashier, and Paul Hanley, his supervisor, were jailed for 32 months and 12 months respectively.

== Career statistics ==
=== Club ===
Appearances and goals by club, season and competition
Club	Season	League			National Cup		League Cup		Europe		Other		Total		Ref.
Club	Season	Division	Apps	Goals	Apps	Goals	Apps	Goals	Apps	Goals	Apps	Goals	Apps	Goals	Ref.
Charleroi	1998–99	First Division	19	1					—		—		19	1	
Standard Liège	1999–2000	First Division	28	3					—		—		28	3	
Standard Liège	2000–01	First Division	29	4					2	1	—		31	5	
Standard Liège	Total		57	7					2	1	0	0	59	8	—
Marseille	2001–02	Division 1	23	2	3	1	2	0	—		—		28	4	
Marseille	2002–03	Ligue 1	35	8	2	1	4	0	—		—		41	9	
Marseille	2003–04	Ligue 1	18	2	2	0	1	0	8	1	—		29	3	
Marseille	Total		76	6	7	2	7	0	8	1	0	0	98	10	—
Manchester City	2003–04	Premier League	5	0	1	0	0	0	0	0	—		6	0	
Hamburger SV	2004–05	Bundesliga	34	5	1	0	—		4	0	—		39	5	
Hamburger SV	2005–06	Bundesliga	27	2	3	1	—		15	2	—		45	5	
Hamburger SV	Total		61	7	4	1	0	0	19	2	0	0	84	10	—
Bayern Munich	2006–07	Bundesliga	31	3	3	0	2	0	10	2	—		46	5	
Bayern Munich	2007–08	Bundesliga	19	1	4	1	1	0	3	1	—		27	3	
Bayern Munich	2008–09	Bundesliga	18	3	2	0	—		5	1	—		25	4	
Bayern Munich	2009–10	Bundesliga	31	6	5	2	—		12	1	—		48	9	
Bayern Munich	2010–11	Bundesliga	21	2	3	0	—		5	0	0	0	39	2	
Bayern Munich	2011–12	Bundesliga	13	4	2	0	—		7	0	—		22	4	
Bayern Munich	2012–13	Bundesliga	13	0	4	0	—		6	0	0	0	23	0	
Bayern Munich	2013–14	Bundesliga	12	1	3	0	—		2	0	1	0	18	1	
Bayern Munich	Total		158	20	26	2	3	0	50	5	1	0	250	32	—
Bayern Munich II	2010–11	3. Liga	1	0	—		—		—		—		1	0	
Bayern Munich II	2011–12	Regionalliga Süd	1	0	—		—		—		—		1	0	
Bayern Munich II	Total		2	0	0	0	0	0	0	0	—		2	0	—
Career total			378	41	38	5	10	0	79	9	1	0	506	55	—

=== International ===
Scores and results list Belgium's goal tally first, score column indicates score after each Van Buyten goal.

List of international goals scored by Daniel Van Buyten
No.	Date	Venue	Opponent	Score	Result	Competition
1	24 March 2001	Hampden Park, Glasgow, Scotland	Scotland	2–2	2–2	2002 FIFA World Cup qualification
2	30 March 2005	Stadio Olimpico, Serravalle, San Marino	San Marino	2–1	2–1	2006 FIFA World Cup qualification
3	7 September 2005	Olympisch Stadion, Antwerp, Belgium	San Marino	8–0	8–0	2006 FIFA World Cup qualification
4	6 September 2006	Republican Stadium, Yerevan, Armenia	Armenia	1–0	1–0	UEFA Euro 2008 qualifying
5	11 February 2009	Cristal Arena, Genk, Belgium	Slovenia	1–0	2–0	Friendly
6	11 February 2009	Cristal Arena, Genk, Belgium	Slovenia	2–0	2–0	Friendly
7	9 September 2009	Republican Stadium, Yerevan, Armenia	Armenia	1–2	1–2	2010 FIFA World Cup qualification
8	7 September 2010	Şükrü Saracoğlu Stadium, Istanbul, Turkey	Turkey	1–0	2–3	UEFA Euro 2012 qualifying
9	7 September 2010	Şükrü Saracoğlu Stadium, Istanbul, Turkey	Turkey	2–2	2–3	UEFA Euro 2012 qualifying
10	11 November 2011	Stade Maurice Dufrasne, Liège, Belgium	Romania	1–0	2–1	Friendly

== Honours ==
=== Club ===
Hamburger SV

- UEFA Intertoto Cup: 2005

Bayern Munich

- Bundesliga: 2007–08, 2009–10, 2012–13, 2013–14
- DFB-Pokal: 2007–08, 2009–10, 2012–13, 2013–14
- DFL-Ligapokal: 2007
- DFL-Supercup: 2010, 2012
- UEFA Champions League: 2012–13
- UEFA Super Cup: 2013
- FIFA Club World Cup: 2013

=== International ===
==== Belgium ====
- FIFA Fair Play Trophy: 2002 World Cup

=== Individual ===
- UNFP Ligue 1 Team of the Year: 2002–03
- ESM Team of the Year: 2002–03
- Bundesliga kicker Team of the Season: 2004–05
- Belgian Sports Merit Award: 2014
- DH The Best Standard Liège Team Ever: 2020

=== Orders ===
- Officer in the Walloon Merit: 2014
