= Lamine Sakho =

Senegalese footballer (born 1977)

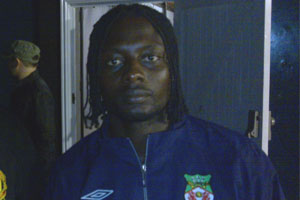
- Sakho in 2009

Personal information
- Date of birth: 28 September 1977 (age 49)
- Place of birth: Louga, Senegal
- Height: 1.78 m (5 ft 10 in)
- Positions: Winger; striker

Senior career*
| Years | Team | Apps | (Gls) |
| 1997–1999 | Nîmes | 62 | (19) |
| 1999–2001 | Lens | 62 | (18) |
| 2002–2005 | Marseille | 43 | (10) |
| 2003–2004 | → Leeds United (loan) | 17 | (1) |
| 2004–2007 | Saint-Étienne | 20 | (1) |
| 2007–2008 | Montpellier | 36 | (3) |
| 2008–2009 | Alki Larnaca | 6 | (0) |
| 2009–2010 | Wrexham | 18 | (1) |
| 2012 | Consolat Marseille | 8 | (0) |
| Total | | 272 | (53) |

International career
| 2004 | Senegal | 2 | (0) |
- * Club domestic league appearances and goals

Lamine Sakho (born 28 September 1977) is a Senegalese former professional footballer who played as a winger or striker.

== Career ==
=== Early career ===
Sakho's previous clubs were Nîmes Olympique, RC Lens, Olympique Marseille and AS Saint-Étienne

=== Leeds United ===
Sakho also had a short loan spell with Leeds United in which he scored once in 17 appearances, in a 3–2 win at Middlesbrough in August 2003. At Leeds United Sakho had a hugely promising debut against Newcastle United where he played left wing and received man of the match, after that his form never came up to the same standard and after suffering a cruciate knee ligament injury his time at Leeds was effectively over.

He was known as a striker prior to joining Leeds, but he found himself mainly being played as a winger during his time at the Elland Road club, where he was competing with James Milner and Jermaine Pennant for places. That season Leeds were relegated from the Premier League. Sakho was regarded as one of the more successful loan players that season, after several players such as Roque Junior and Cyril Chapuis had torrid spells at Leeds.

=== Wrexham ===
Following spells in France and Cyprus, he scored his first goal for Wrexham in a 1–0 away win at Ebbsfleet United on 31 October 2009. Sakho received a straight red card for Wrexham in the game against Hayes & Yeading after headbutting a player. His contract was terminated by 'mutual consent' in March 2010 after failing to make an impact at the club.

=== Consolat ===
In January 2012, after almost two years without a club, Sakho signed for Championnat de France amateur club Consolat Marseille. He made his debut on 18 February 2012 in the 1–0 home win against Gap.
