= Ibrahima Bakayoko =

Ivorian footballer (born 1976)

Personal information
- Full name: Ibrahima Bakayoko Sela
- Date of birth: 31 December 1976 (age 49)
- Place of birth: Séguéla, Ivory Coast
- Height: 6 ft 0 in (1.83 m)
- Position: Forward

Youth career
- 1991–1993: Yani Sports
- 1993–1994: Alliance Renaissance

Senior career*
Years	Team	Apps	(Gls)
1994–1996	Stade d'Abidjan	64	(12)
1996–1998	Montpellier	76	(25)
1998–1999	Everton	23	(4)
1999–2003	Marseille	115	(34)
2003–2004	Osasuna	26	(4)
2004–2005	Istres	15	(4)
2005–2007	Livorno	37	(5)
2007	Messina	6	(1)
2007–2008	AEL	30	(4)
2008–2009	PAOK	30	(8)
2009–2012	PAS Giannina	84	(33)
2012–2013	Olympiacos Volos	12	(0)
2014	Stade Bordelais	4	(0)
Total		522	(134)

International career
1996–2002	Ivory Coast	40	(22)
- * Club domestic league appearances and goals

Ibrahima Bakayoko (born 31 December 1976) is an Ivorian retired professional footballer who played as a forward.

== Club career ==
Playing in France with Montpellier, Bakayoko was rated highly enough by Everton manager Walter Smith that Smith was willing to pay £4.5 million for Bakayoko's services in October 1998. However, he failed to impress in the 23 games he played, only finding the net four times in the league (seven times in all competitions). A brief highlight was scoring twice as Everton beat Blackburn Rovers 2–1 at Ewood Park. He was sold for £4 million in June 1999 to Marseille.

A spell in Spain with Osasuna followed, before Bakayoko returned for a third spell in France, this time representing Istres, before he moved over the Alps to Italy, first with Livorno and then with Messina. On 28 January 2007, he played his first Serie A match for Messina against Ascoli.

In the summer of 2007, he joined Greek SuperLeague outfit AEL. On 20 September 2007, he scored from 30 yards for his new side in the UEFA Cup first round first leg against English Premier League side Blackburn Rovers. On 19 June 2008, he joined PAOK for a year.

After his contract expired, Bakayoko signed a two-year contract for newly promoted PAS Giannina on 27 July 2009.

== International career ==
Bakayoko is a former international for Ivory Coast. He made his first appearance for The Elephants in 1995.

== Personal life ==
Bakayoko holds Ivorian and French nationalities. He is the uncle of the French footballer Ryan Bakayoko.

== Championship Manager ==
Bakayoko came to be known as a legendary signing in the computer game Championship Manager. Writing in FourFourTwo, Ed McCambridge noted: "Rapidly becoming the standout attacking midfielder or forward on Championship Manager 97/98, Bakayoko could be bought for a pretty low sum from Montpellier at the start of the game and was willing to join any Premier League side".

== Career statistics ==
=== International ===
Appearances and goals by national team and year
National team	Year	Apps	Goals
Ivory Coast	1996	4	1
Ivory Coast	1997	5	2
Ivory Coast	1998	7	4
Ivory Coast	1999	4	1
Ivory Coast	2000	6	4
Ivory Coast	2001	10	10
Ivory Coast	2002	3	0
Total		39	22

Scores and results list Ivory Coast's goal tally first, score column indicates score after each Bakayoko goal.

List of international goals scored by Ibrahima Bakayoko
No.	Date	Venue	Opponent	Score	Result	Competition	Ref.
1	9 June 1996	Felix Houphouet Boigny Stadium, Abidjan, Ivory Coast	Burkina Faso	1–1	1–1	Friendly	
2	23 February 1997	Stade Modibo Kéïta, Bamako, Mali	Mali	1–1	2–1	1998 Africa Cup of Nations qualification	
3	27 July 1997	Stade de la Paix, Bouaké, Ivory Coast	Mali	4–2	4–2	1998 Africa Cup of Nations qualification	
4	29 January 1998	Stade de la Paix, Bouaké, Ivory Coast	Mozambique	3–1	4–1	Friendly	
5	29 January 1998	Stade de la Paix, Bouaké, Ivory Coast	Mozambique	4–1	4–1	Friendly	
6	8 February 1998	Stade Omnisports, Bobo-Dioulasso, Burkina Faso	Namibia	2–0	4–3	1998 Africa Cup of Nations	
7	16 February 1998	Stade Municipal, Ouagadougou, Burkina Faso	Angola	4–2	5–2	1998 Africa Cup of Nations	
8	11 April 1999	Felix Houphouet Boigny Stadium, Abidjan, Ivory Coast	Congo	1–0	2–0	2000 Africa Cup of Nations qualification	
9	23 April 2000	Felix Houphouet Boigny Stadium, Abidjan, Ivory Coast	Rwanda	1–0	2–0	2002 FIFA World Cup qualification	
10	23 April 2000	Felix Houphouet Boigny Stadium, Abidjan, Ivory Coast	Rwanda	2–0	2–0	2002 FIFA World Cup qualification	
11	18 June 2000	Felix Houphouet Boigny Stadium, Abidjan, Ivory Coast	Tunisia	1–2	2–2	2002 FIFA World Cup qualification	
12	19 November 2000	Felix Houphouet Boigny Stadium, Abidjan, Ivory Coast	Libya	1–1	2–1	2002 Africa Cup of Nations qualification	
13	28 January 2001	Mahamasina Municipal Stadium, Antananarivo, Madagascar	Madagascar	1–0	3–1	2002 FIFA World Cup qualification	
14	28 January 2001	Mahamasina Municipal Stadium, Antananarivo, Madagascar	Madagascar	2–0	3–1	2002 FIFA World Cup qualification	
15	10 March 2001	Stade des Martyrs, Kinshasa, DR Congo	DR Congo	2–0	2–1	2002 FIFA World Cup qualification	
16	22 April 2001	Felix Houphouet Boigny Stadium, Abidjan, Ivory Coast	Congo	2–0	2–0	2002 FIFA World Cup qualification	
17	20 May 2001	El Menzah Stadium, Tunis, Tunisia	Tunisia	1–0	1–1	2002 FIFA World Cup qualification	
18	3 June 2001	Tripoli Stadium, Tripoli, Libya	Libya	2–0	3–0	2002 Africa Cup of Nations qualification	
19	17 June 2001	Felix Houphouet Boigny Stadium, Abidjan, Ivory Coast	Egypt	1–1	2–2	2002 Africa Cup of Nations qualification	
20	1 July 2001	Felix Houphouet Boigny Stadium, Abidjan, Ivory Coast	Madagascar	1–0	6–0	2002 FIFA World Cup qualification	
21	1 July 2001	Felix Houphouet Boigny Stadium, Abidjan, Ivory Coast	Madagascar	2–0	6–0	2002 FIFA World Cup qualification	
22	1 July 2001	Felix Houphouet Boigny Stadium, Abidjan, Ivory Coast	Madagascar	6–0	6–0	2002 FIFA World Cup qualification	

== Honours ==
PAS Giannina

- Super League Greece 2: 2010–11

Individual

- Super League Greece 2 top scorer: 2010–11
