= Stéphane Moulin (referee) =

French football referee (1963–2020)

- Born: 27 October 1963; Rennes, France
- Died: 8 November 2020 (aged 57); Paris, France

Domestic
Years	League	Role
1993–2008	Ligue 2	Referee
1993–2008	Coupe de France	Referee
1995–2007	Coupe de la Ligue	Referee
1996–2008	Ligue 1	Referee
2000	Trophée des Champions	Referee
2000	UEFA Intertoto Cup	Referee
2000–2001	UEFA Europa League	Referee
2002	UEFA European Under-21 Championship	Referee

Stéphane Moulin (27 October 1963 – 8 November 2020) was a French football referee. Moulin began his officiating career in 1991, presiding over games in Ligue 1 and Ligue 2. He also served as President of the Arbitration Committee of the Ligue de Franche-Comté de football.

== Biography ==
Moulin started refereeing in his native Jura region before moving up to the Bourgogne-Franche-Comté League. During his early years, he was seen as a protege of the former professional referee Michel Vautrot and became friends with him. He started refereeing at French Federal league level in 1991 and in 1995, he turned professional and started refereeing in the Ligue de Football Professionnel. He refereed over 300 matches at the top level in France, including 155 Ligue 1 matches and 30 Coupe de France matches before retiring in 2008. After retiring, he joined the French Football Federation's refereeing steering committee, eventually becoming their president. He volunteered from 1992 to 2012 on the Regional Referees Commission in Franche-Comté while also serving as their president.

In 2000, before refereeing a UEFA Intertoto Cup match between Romania's Ceahlăul Piatra Neamț and Austria's Austria Vienna, he was approached by the Ceahlăul Piatra Neamț president Gheorghe Stefan who attempted to bribe Moulin with four prostitutes. When Moulin reported this to UEFA, Stefan was banned from football for a year, despite his claim that they were just folk singers. In 2002, he drew attention for issuing four red cards in a match between Lille and Paris Saint-Germain (PSG). The media claimed that he had also sent off Lille's Mile Sterjovski but Moulin later clarified he was directing it at PSG's Frederic Dehu a second time due to him refusing to leave the pitch.

== Personal life ==
Outside of refereeing, he was a teacher of history and geography. Stéphane Moulin died in Paris on 8 November 2020, at the age of 57.
