= Cyril Chapuis =

French footballer (born 1979)

Personal information
- Date of birth: 21 March 1979 (age 47)
- Place of birth: Lyon, France
- Height: 1.81 m (5 ft 11 in)
- Position: Striker

Youth career
- 1996–1998: Niort

Senior career*
Years	Team	Apps	(Gls)
1998–2000	Niort	23	(4)
2000–2001	Rennes	44	(13)
2002–2005	Marseille	42	(4)
2003	→ Leeds United (loan)	1	(0)
2004	→ Strasbourg (loan)	9	(1)
2004–2005	→ Ajaccio (loan)	21	(3)
2006–2007	Grenoble	28	(5)
2007–2009	Metz	11	(1)
2012–2014	Bourg-Péronnas	29	(4)
Total		208	(35)

International career
2000–2002	France U-21	9	(0)
Medal record
Men's football
Representing France
UEFA European Under-21 Championship
Runner-up	2002 Switzerland
- * Club domestic league appearances and goals

Cyril Chapuis (born 21 March 1979) is a French former professional footballer who played as a striker.

== Club career ==
Chapuis started his professional career at Niort in Ligue 2 and then moved to Ligue 1 for Rennes.

In January 2002, he signed a five-year contract with Olympique de Marseille, playing one and a half season with Marseille before being loaned on three occasions to Leeds United (playing just once in the league, against Bolton in November 2003), Strasbourg and Ajaccio. He was released in summer 2005.

After being without a club for one year, he joined Grenoble in Ligue 2.

In November 2012, after three years without playing a single game, Chapuis joined National team Bourg-Péronnas.

== International career ==
He was called up to the French Under 21s and was part of the squad of Les Bleuets that lost to Czech U-21 in the final of the 2002 UEFA European Under-21 Football Championship.
