= Bertrand Layec =

French football referee

- Born: 3 July 1965 (age 61); Vannes, France

Domestic
Years	League	Role
1998–2010	Ligue 1	Referee

International
Years	League	Role
2002–2010	UEFA	Referee

Bertrand Layec (French pronunciation: [bɛʁtʁɑ̃ lajɛk]; born 3 July 1965) is a former French football referee. He was registered as a Fédéral 1 referee in France meaning he is eligible to officiate Ligue 1 and Ligue 2 matches, as well as matches in the Coupe de France and Coupe de la Ligue. Layec refereed his first match in Ligue 1 in 1998 and, in 2002, became a FIFA official. He refereed his last match on the final day of the 2009–10 season and now serves as the president of the Direction Nationale de L'Arbitrage (English: National Leadership of Arbitration) (DNA). Layec is currently under investigation by the French justice system for defamation of character after distributing an abusive e-mail directed at Bruno Derrien, a former referee who authored a controversial book directed at his profession.

At international level, Layec officiated at the 2007 FIFA U-17 World Cup, as well as Euro 2008 qualifiers and 2010 World Cup qualifiers.
