= Stéphane Bré =

French football referee

Stéphane Bré (born 29 March 1966 in Saint-Brieuc) is a French football referee. He has refereed in the French Football Federation (FFF) since 1992 and has been a FIFA referee since 1998.

Bré has officiated the 2000 Olympic tournament in Sydney. He also served as a referee in qualifiers for the Euro 2000 and 2002 World Cup tournaments. This former General Intelligence Police Officer is a captain in a general information sub-directorate.
