= Alain Sars =

French football referee

- Full name: Alain Sars
- Born: 30 April 1961 (age 65); Dombasle-sur-Meurthe, France

Domestic
Years	League	Role
–2006	Ligue 1	Referee

International
Years	League	Role
1993–2006	FIFA–listed	Referee

Alain Sars (born 30 April 1961) is a retired French football referee.

Sars has officiated matches in the 2000 African Cup of Nations, UEFA Champions League, the UEFA European Football Championship, and the 1995 FIFA World Youth Championship. He also served as a referee in qualifying matches for the Euro 1996, 1998 World Cup, Euro 2000, 2002 World Cup, Euro 2004, and 2006 World Cup tournaments.

Alin Sars became infamous in Sweden in the Champions League game between AIK and FC Barcelona in the year 1999. AIK took a surprising lead by Nebojša Novaković when there were 20 minutes left of the game. In the 85th minute Sars decided to allow Barcelona to commence with their corner kick during a double substitution for AIK, resulting in a goal. AIK lost the game 1-2 after a late goal in extra time from Barcelona. The Swedes were furious and the head coach of AIK Stuart Baxter was sent off after heavily protesting the unjust goal. Even to this day Sars is an unpopular referee among AIK-fans.

The AIK-Barcelona game was not the first game in which he made a huge scandal. In a game between PSV Eindhoven and 1. FC Kaiserslautern he allowed a goal when the ball wasn't over the line thanks to player protests.

Sars attarcted similar criticism in 2000 for his refereeing of a 2002 FIFA World Cup qualification game between England and Finland. England's Ray Parlour had a shot that went over the goalline, but Sars and linesman Pierre Ufrasi did not spot this and did not give the goal. Sars also only gave Finnish goalkeeper Antti Niemi a yellow card for a foul on Teddy Sheringham that England felt deserved a red card. Sars called for the introduction of video refereeing and replays following the match.

After these scandals Sars was appointed as a referee in FIFA World Cup qualifiers for the 1998, 2002 and 2006 World Cups. However, he never refereed at a World Cup itself. Sars was named by FIFA in March 2006 as one of the 44 candidate referees to officiate at the 2006 FIFA World Cup in Germany, but he was not among those selected for the tournament.

He retired internationally in 2006. After his retirement, Sars worked as a regional technical advisor for the Lorraine Football League, and as a consultant for Canal+ and RTL.
