= Karim Dahou =

French footballer (born 1982)

Personal information
- Date of birth: 15 May 1982 (age 44)
- Place of birth: Orange, France
- Height: 1.68 m (5 ft 6 in)
- Position: Attacking midfielder

Senior career*
Years	Team	Apps	(Gls)
1999–2004	Marseille	12	(0)
2004–2005	→ Lorient (loan)	10	(0)
2005–2007	→ Nîmes (loan)	17	(1)
2007–2008	SC Orange		
2008–2010	SC Annonay		
2011–2012	FC Saint-Maurice		
- * Club domestic league appearances and goals

Karim Dahou (French pronunciation: [kaʁim dau]; born 15 May 1982) is a French former professional footballer who played as a midfielder. His previous notable clubs include Olympique de Marseille and FC Lorient. (Note: Karim Dahou – French league stats at LFP – also available in French (archived)) He is of Moroccan and Algerian descent and has represented France at youth level and Morocco at the Olympic level.
