= Laurent Duhamel =

French football referee

Laurent Duhamel (born 10 October 1968 in Rouen) is a French football referee. He has been a referee in the French Football Federation (FFF) since 1993 and a FIFA referee since 1999. He was suspended from refereeing in France in 2009, but allowed to continue to referee international matches.

Duhamel has officiated in qualifiers for the 2002, 2006, and 2010 World Cups, as well as Euro 2008 qualifying.
