= 2006–07 Olympique de Marseille season =

Marseille
2006–07 season
- Chairman: Robert Louis-Dreyfus
- Manager: Albert Emon
- Ligue 1: 2nd
- Coupe de France: Runners-up
- Coupe de la Ligue: Round of 16
- UEFA Cup: First round
- Intertoto Cup: Progress
- Top goalscorer: League: Mamadou Niang (12 goals); All: Mamadou Niang (17 goals)
Home colours	Away colours	Third colours

Olympique de Marseille had a solid season, but did not manage to win the elusive trophy they had chased for 14 years, with the biggest disappointment being losing on penalty shootout against Sochaux in the Coupe de France final. The 2nd-place finish of Ligue 1 was the best for eight years, but the side were never in title contention, being 18 points adrift of Lyon.

== Squad ==
Note: Flags indicate national team as defined under FIFA eligibility rules; some limited exceptions apply. Players may hold more than one non-FIFA nationality.

No.	Pos.	Nation	Player
1	GK	FRA	Cédric Carrasso
2	DF	ARG	Renato Civelli
3	DF	NGA	Taye Taiwo
4	DF	FRA	Julien Rodríguez
5	DF	FRA	Alain Cantareil
6	DF	FRA	Garry Bocaly
7	MF	FRA	Franck Ribéry
8	MF	NGA	Wilson Oruma
9	FW	FRA	Djibril Cissé (on loan from Liverpool)
10	FW	FRA	Mickaël Pagis
11	FW	SEN	Mamadou Niang
13	FW	FRA	Toifilou Maoulida
14	FW	ALG	Salim Arrache

No.	Pos.	Nation	Player
15	DF	FRA	Ronald Zubar
16	GK	FRA	Sébastien Hamel
17	MF	CMR	Modeste M'bami
19	MF	ALB	Lorik Cana (captain)
20	DF	FRA	Hassoun Camara
22	MF	FRA	Samir Nasri
23	DF	SEN	Habib Beye
25	DF	SEN	Mame N'Diaye
26	DF	SVN	Boštjan Cesar
27	DF	CMR	Salomon Olembe
28	MF	FRA	Mathieu Valbuena
30	GK	ALG	Mehdi Sennaoui

== Competitions ==
=== Ligue 1 ===
==== League table ====
Pos	Team	Pld	W	D	L	GF	GA	GD	Pts	Qualification or relegation
1	Lyon (C)	38	24	9	5	64	27	+37	81	Qualification to Champions League group stage
2	Marseille	38	19	7	12	53	38	+15	64	Qualification to Champions League group stage
3	Toulouse	38	17	7	14	44	43	+1	58	Qualification to Champions League third qualifying round
4	Rennes	38	14	15	9	38	30	+8	57	Qualification to UEFA Cup first round
5	Lens	38	15	12	11	47	41	+6	57	Qualification to Intertoto Cup third round

Source: Ligue 1
Rules for classification: 1) points; 2) goal difference; 3) number of goals scored.
(C) Champions

==== Results summary ====
Overall								Home						Away					
Pld	W	D	L	GF	GA	GD	Pts	W	D	L	GF	GA	GD	W	D	L	GF	GA	GD
38	19	7	12	53	38	+15	64	14	2	3	35	16	+19	5	5	9	18	22	−4

Source: LFP.fr

==== Results by round ====
Round	1	2	3	4	5	6	7	8	9	10	11	12	13	14	15	16	17	18	19	20	21	22	23	24	25	26	27	28	29	30	31	32	33	34	35	36	37	38
Ground	A	H	A	H	A	H	A	H	A	H	A	H	A	H	A	A	H	A	H	A	H	A	H	A	H	A	H	A	H	A	H	A	H	H	A	H	A	H
Result	D	W	W	W	W	W	L	W	D	L	L	L	L	W	D	L	W	L	W	W	W	L	D	L	D	L	L	D	W	L	W	D	W	W	W	W	W	W
Position	11	5	1	1	1	2	2	2	2	2	2	6	8	6	7	8	6	7	6	3	2	4	4	4	5	8	8	8	8	8	5	5	5	4	4	2	2	2

Source: LFP.fr
A = Away; H = Home; W = Win; D = Draw; L = Loss

==== Matches ====
6 August 2006 1	Sedan	0–0	Marseille	Sedan
18:00				Stadium: Stade Louis Dugauguez; Attendance: 22,799; Referee: Olivier Thual

13 August 2006 2	Marseille	2–0	Rennes	Marseille
21:00	Pagis 38'; Maoulida 85'			Stadium: Stade Vélodrome; Attendance: 55,711; Referee: Thierry Auriac

19 August 2006 3	Auxerre	0–3	Marseille	Auxerre
17:15			Ribéry 45'; Maoulida 49'; Pagis 70'	Stadium: Stade de l'Abbé-Deschamps; Attendance: 19,415; Referee: Stéphane Lannoy

27 August 2006 4	Marseille	2–0	Le Mans	Marseille
18:00	Bamogo 69'; Niang 79' (pen.)			Stadium: Stade Vélodrome; Attendance: 52,672; Referee: Stéphane Moulin

10 September 2006 5	Paris Saint-Germain	1–3	Marseille	Paris
21:00	Pauleta 22' (pen.)		Niang 7' (pen.); Nasri 67'; Pagis 88'	Stadium: Parc des Princes; Attendance: 44,431; Referee: Stéphane Bré

17 September 2006 6	Marseille	2–1	Bordeaux	Marseille
21:00	Pagis 49'; Taiwo 53'		Chamakh 63' (pen.)	Stadium: Stade Vélodrome; Attendance: 55,000; Referee: Laurent Duhamel

24 September 2006 7	Nantes	2–1	Marseille	Nantes
21:00	Payet 38'; Norbert 49'		Niang 78'	Stadium: Stade de la Beaujoire; Attendance: 35,068; Referee: Tony Chapron

1 October 2006 8	Marseille	3–0	Toulouse	Marseille
18:00	Taiwo 44'; Bamogo 45+2'; Cana 47'			Stadium: Stade Vélodrome; Attendance: 48,833; Referee: Stéphane Lannoy

15 October 2006 9	Lens	1–1	Marseille	Lens
21:00	Dindane 79' (pen.)		Niang 62' (pen.)	Stadium: Stade Félix-Bollaert; Attendance: 40,549; Referee: Fredy Fautrel

22 October 2006 10	Marseille	1–4	Lyon	Marseille
21:00	Bamogo 70'		Juninho 20', 78'; Benzema 48'; Källström 87'	Stadium: Stade Vélodrome; Attendance: 57,376; Referee: Bertrand Layec

29 October 2006 11	Nice	2–1	Marseille	Nice
18:00	Rool 25'; Ederson 90' (pen.)		Pagis 62'	Stadium: Stade du Ray; Attendance: 15,030; Referee: Éric Poulat

4 November 2006 12	Marseille	0–1	Lorient	Marseille
20:00			Gignac 48'	Stadium: Stade Vélodrome; Attendance: 48,879; Referee: Alain Hamer

12 November 2006 13	Lille	1–0	Marseille	Villeneuve-d'Ascq
21:00	Bodmer 45+2'			Stadium: Stadium Lille-Metropole; Attendance: 17,355; Referee: Laurent Duhamel

19 November 2006 14	Marseille	1–0	Valenciennes	Marseille
21:00	Pagis 60'			Stadium: Stade Vélodrome; Attendance: 46,484; Referee: Damien Ledentu

25 November 2006 15	Troyes	1–1	Marseille	Troyes
17:15	Lachuer 18'		Maoulida 60'	Stadium: Stade de l'Aube; Attendance: 18,579; Referee: Philippe Malige

3 December 2006 16	Sochaux	1–0	Marseille	Montbéliard
18:00	Afolabi 76'			Stadium: Stade Auguste Bonal; Attendance: 19,990; Referee: Philippe Kalt

9 December 2006 17	Marseille	2–1	Monaco	Marseille
20:00	Pagis 37'; Niang 77'		Di Vaio 58'	Stadium: Stade Vélodrome; Attendance: 47,708; Referee: Tony Chapron

16 December 2006 18	Nancy	2–0	Marseille	Tomblaine
17:10	Gavanon 43'; Kim 71'			Stadium: Stade Marcel Picot; Attendance: 20,081; Referee: Bertrand Layec

22 December 2006 19	Marseille	2–1	Saint-Étienne	Marseille
21:00	Cissé 9'; Pagis 63'		Heinz 45+1'	Stadium: Stade Vélodrome; Attendance: 53,614; Referee: Olivier Thual

14 January 2007 20	Rennes	0–2	Marseille	Rennes
21:00			Cissé 58'; Maoulida 90+2'	Stadium: Stade de la Route de Lorient; Attendance: 29,144; Referee: Éric Poulat

24 January 2007 21	Marseille	3–1	Auxerre	Marseille
17:00	Ribéry 7', 38'; Taiwo 87'		Jeleń 16'	Stadium: Stade Vélodrome; Attendance: 0 Referee: Hervé Piccirillo

28 January 2007 22	Le Mans	2–0	Marseille	Le Mans
17:10	Fanchone 38'; Grafite 83' (pen.)			Stadium: Stade Léon-Bollée; Attendance: 15,976; Referee: Lionel Jaffredo

4 February 2007 23	Marseille	1–1	Paris Saint-Germain	Marseille
21:00	Cissé 68'		Pauleta 74'	Stadium: Stade Vélodrome; Attendance: 56,592; Referee: Bertrand Layec

11 February 2007 24	Bordeaux	1–0	Marseille	Bordeaux
21:00	Faubert 74'			Stadium: Stade Chaban-Delmas; Attendance: 32,200; Referee: Tony Chapron

18 February 2007 25	Marseille	0–0	Nantes	Marseille
21:00				Stadium: Stade Vélodrome; Attendance: 49,507; Referee: Éric Poulat

24 February 2007 26	Toulouse	3–0	Marseille	Toulouse
17:10	Elmander 39', 48'; Emana 63'			Stadium: Stadium de Toulouse; Attendance: 35,164; Referee: Alain Hamer

4 March 2007 27	Marseille	0–1	Lens	Marseille
21:00			Dindane 58' (pen.)	Stadium: Stade Vélodrome; Attendance: 51,718; Referee: Stéphane Bré

11 March 2007 28	Lyon	1–1	Marseille	Lyon
21:00	Baroš 19'		Niang 86'	Stadium: Stade de Gerland; Attendance: 38,930; Referee: Philippe Kalt

17 March 2007 29	Marseille	3–0	Nice	Marseille
20:00	Niang 6', 40'; Civelli 13'			Stadium: Stade Vélodrome; Attendance: 50,007; Referee: Stéphane Lannoy

31 March 2007 30	Lorient	2–1	Marseille	Lorient
17:10	Saïfi 60'; Le Pen 74'		Cissé 81' (pen.)	Stadium: Stade du Moustoir; Attendance: 15,572; Referee: Stéphane Moulin

8 April 2007 31	Marseille	4–1	Lille	Marseille
21:00	Niang 9' (pen.), 90+1'; Civelli 38', 63'		Bastos 11' (pen.)	Stadium: Stade Vélodrome; Attendance: 54,862; Referee: Hervé Piccirillo

14 April 2007 32	Valenciennes	0–0	Marseille	Valenciennes
20:00				Stadium: Stade Nungesser; Attendance: 16,398; Referee: Éric Poulat

21 April 2007 33	Marseille	2–1	Troyes	Marseille
20:00	Cissé 55'; M'Bami 86'		Jaziri 80'	Stadium: Stade Vélodrome; Attendance: 47,708; Referee: Damien Ledentu

29 April 2007 34	Marseille	4–2	Sochaux	Marseille
21:00	Cana 13'; Cissé 68'; Nasri 73'; Ribéry 85'		Leroy 5'; Rodriguez 90+2' (o.g.)	Stadium: Stade Vélodrome; Attendance: 54,702; Referee: Laurent Duhamel

6 May 2007 35	Monaco	1–2	Marseille	Monaco
21:05	Ménez 12'		Ribéry 45'; Niang 84' (pen.)	Stadium: Stade Louis II; Attendance: 16,401; Referee: Saïd Ennjimi

9 May 2007 36	Marseille	2–1	Nancy	Marseille
20:30	Niang 78' (pen.); Cissé 81'		Puygrenier 80'	Stadium: Stade Vélodrome; Attendance: 44,000; Referee: Thierry Auriac

19 May 2007 37	Saint-Étienne	1–2	Marseille	Saint-Étienne
20:45	Feindouno 69'		Cissé 54'; Valbuena 86'	Stadium: Stade Geoffroy-Guichard; Attendance: 34,466; Referee: Bertrand Layec

26 May 2007 38	Marseille	1–0	Sedan	Marseille
20:45	Nasri 61'			Stadium: Stade Vélodrome; Attendance: 53,604; Referee: Olivier Thua

=== Coupe de France ===
6 January 2007 Round of 64	Cambrai	1–4 (a.e.t.)	Marseille	Villeneuve-d'Ascq
21:00	Bailleul 78'		Cissé 18', 107', 111'; Maoulida 114'	Stadium: Stadium Lille-Metropole; Attendance: 13,446; Referee: Jean-Charles Cailleux

20 January 2007 Round of 32	Le Mans	0–1	Marseille	Le Mans
17:00			Niang 120' (pen.)	Stadium: Stade Leon-Bollee; Attendance: 12,532; Referee: Thierry Auriac

31 January 2007 Round of 16	Marseille	2–1	Lyon	Marseille
21:00	Pagis 87'; Niang 90+1'		Cris 17'	Stadium: Stade Vélodrome; Attendance: 57,346; Referee: Laurent Duhamel

27 February 2007 Quarter-finals	Marseille	5–0	Vannes	Marseille
20:45	Niang 2'; Maoulida 32' (pen.), 65'; Cissé 61' (pen.); Pagis 90+1'			Stadium: Stade Vélodrome; Attendance: 32,000; Referee: Olivier Thual

18 April 2007 Semi-finals	Marseille	3–0	Nantes	Marseille
21:00	Ribéry 28'; Maoulida 55'; Cissé 76'			Stadium: Stade Vélodrome; Attendance: 55,333; Referee: Tony Chapron

12 May 2007 Final	Marseille	2–2 (a.e.t.) (4–5 p)	Sochaux	Saint-Denis
20:50	Cissé 5', 98'		Dagano 67'; Le Tallec 115'	Stadium: Stade de France; Attendance: 79,797; Referee: Éric Poulat
	Penalties
	Taiwo (penalty scored); Maoulida (penalty missed); Cana (penalty scored); Cissé (penalty scored); Nasri (penalty scored); Zubar (penalty missed)		(penalty scored) Ziani; (penalty scored) Birsa; (penalty scored) Le Tallec; (penalty scored) Leroy; (penalty missed) Bréchet; (penalty scored) Brunel

=== Coupe de la Ligue ===
20 September 2006 Third round	Montpellier	1–2	Marseille	Montpellier
21:00	Montaño 68'		Bamogo 10'; Maoulida 23'	Stadium: Stade de la Mosson; Attendance: 21,461; Referee: Philippe Kalt

25 October 2006 Round of 16	Saint-Étienne	4–1	Marseille	Saint-Étienne
17:00	Diawara 34'; Hautcœur 45'; Gomis 51'; Bilos 38' (pen.)		Pagis 54' (pen.)	Stadium: Stade Geoffroy-Guichard; Attendance: 31,305; Referee: Hervé Piccirillo

=== Intertoto Cup ===
==== Third round ====
15 July 2006 First leg	Marseille (France)	0–0	(Ukraine) Dnipro Dnipropetrovsk	Fos-sur-Mer, France
				Stadium: Stade Parsemain; Attendance: 6,884; Referee: Bernardino González Vázquez (Spain)

22 July 2006 Second leg	Dnipro Dnipropetrovsk (Ukraine)	2–2 (2–2a agg.)	(France) Marseille	Dnipropetrovsk, Ukraine
	Nazarenko 78'; Rusol 87'		Niang 71'; Oruma 75'	Stadium: Meteor Stadium; Attendance: 19,000; Referee: Howard Webb (England)

=== UEFA Cup ===
==== Second qualifying round ====
10 August 2006 First leg	Young Boys (Switzerland)	3–3	(France) Marseille	Bern, Switzerland
	Yakin 20'; João Paulo 49'; Marcos 73'		Zubar 18'; Niang 44', 57'	Stadium: Wankdorf Stadium; Referee: Bernhard Brugger (Austria)

24 August 2006 Second leg	Marseille (France)	0–0 (3a–3 agg.)	(Switzerland) Young Boys	Marseille, France
20:45		Report		Stadium: Stade Vélodrome; Referee: Emil Božinovski (Macedonia)

==== First round ====
14 September 2006 First leg	Marseille (France)	1–0	(Czech Republic) Mladá Boleslav	Marseille, France
20:45	Bamogo 31'	Report		Stadium: Stade Vélodrome; Referee: Espen Berntsen (Norway)

28 September 2006 Second leg	Mladá Boleslav (Czech Republic)	4–2 (4–3 agg.)	(France) Marseille	Mladá Boleslav, Czech Republic
17:30	Pecka 34'; Holub 62' (pen.), 82'; Sedláček 90+2'	Report	Maoulida 19'; Taiwo 56'	Stadium: Městský stadion Referee: Ruud Bossen (Netherlands)

== Sources ==
- FootballSquads - Marseille 2006/2007
- LFP.fr - Ligue de Football Professionel
