= 2005–06 Olympique de Marseille season =

Marseille
2005–06 season
- Chairman: Robert Louis-Dreyfus
- Manager: Jean Fernandez
- Ligue 1: 5th
- Coupe de France: Runners-up
- Coupe de la Ligue: Second round
- UEFA Cup: Round of 16
- Intertoto Cup: Winners
- Top goalscorer: League: Mamadou Niang (10 goals); All: Mamadou Niang (13 goals)
Home colours	Away colours	Third colours

Olympique de Marseille just missed out on Champions League qualification, but recorded 60 league points, an improvement on previous seasons. New signing Franck Ribéry got an international breakthrough, being linked to transfers to several European top clubs and being instrumental in France reaching the final of the World Cup. In spite of all rumours, Ribéry would stay at the club for a further season. That did not apply to manager Jean Fernandez, who left for Auxerre at the end of the season.

== Squad ==
Note: Flags indicate national team as defined under FIFA eligibility rules; some limited exceptions apply. Players may hold more than one non-FIFA nationality.

No.	Pos.	Nation	Player
1	GK	FRA	Cédric Carrasso
2	DF	BRA	André Luís (on loan from Benfica)
3	DF	NGA	Taye Taiwo
4	DF	BRA	Demetrius Ferreira
5	DF	FRA	Frédéric Déhu
6	MF	POR	Delfim
7	MF	FRA	Franck Ribéry
8	MF	NGA	Wilson Oruma
9	FW	FRA	Toifilou Maoulida (on loan from Monaco)
11	FW	SEN	Mamadou Niang
12	DF	CIV	Abdoulaye Méïté
13	FW	ARG	Christian Giménez

No.	Pos.	Nation	Player
14	MF	FRA	Sabri Lamouchi
16	GK	FRA	Fabien Barthez
17	FW	PER	Andrés Mendoza (on loan from Metalurh Donetsk)
18	DF	FRA	Jérôme Bonnissel
19	MF	ALB	Lorik Cana (captain)
20	MF	FRA	Laurent Batlles
21	DF	FRA	Alain Cantareil
22	MF	FRA	Samir Nasri
23	DF	SEN	Habib Beye
25	FW	FRA	Mickaël Pagis
26	DF	SVN	Boštjan Cesar
28	DF	ARG	Renato Civelli
30	GK	FRA	Yannick Quesnel
33	DF	MAR	Mehdi Benatia

== Competitions ==
=== Ligue 1 ===
==== League table ====
Pos	Team	Pld	W	D	L	GF	GA	GD	Pts	Qualification or relegation
3	Lille	38	16	14	8	56	31	+25	62	Qualification to Champions League third qualifying round
4	Lens	38	14	18	6	48	34	+14	60	Qualification to UEFA Cup first round
5	Marseille	38	16	12	10	44	35	+9	60	Qualification to Intertoto Cup third round
6	Auxerre	38	17	8	13	50	39	+11	59	Qualification to Intertoto Cup third round
7	Rennes	38	18	5	15	48	49	−1	59	

Source: Ligue 1
Rules for classification: 1) points; 2) goal difference; 3) number of goals scored.

==== Results summary ====
Overall								Home						Away					
Pld	W	D	L	GF	GA	GD	Pts	W	D	L	GF	GA	GD	W	D	L	GF	GA	GD
38	16	12	10	44	35	+9	60	10	8	1	28	13	+15	6	4	9	16	22	−6

Source: LFP.fr

==== Results by round ====
Round	1	2	3	4	5	6	7	8	9	10	11	12	13	14	15	16	17	18	19	20	21	22	23	24	25	26	27	28	29	30	31	32	33	34	35	36	37	38
Ground	H	A	H	A	H	A	H	A	H	A	H	A	H	A	H	H	A	H	A	H	A	H	A	H	A	H	A	H	A	H	A	H	A	A	H	A	H	A
Result	L	L	D	L	D	W	W	L	W	W	W	L	D	L	W	W	D	W	W	D	L	W	L	D	W	D	L	W	D	W	D	D	W	L	W	W	D	D
Position	18	19	17	19	20	16	13	16	12	9	7	9	11	12	11	9	10	7	7	7	9	6	6	6	5	6	7	5	5	5	5	7	7	7	5	4	4	5

Source: LFP.fr
A = Away; H = Home; W = Win; D = Draw; L = Loss

==== Matches ====
30 July 2005 1	Marseille	0–2	Bordeaux	Marseille
17:15			Faubert 16'; Ducasse 87'	Stadium: Stade Vélodrome; Attendance: 50,041; Referee: Bertrand Layec

6 August 2005 2	Lens	2–0	Marseille	Lens
17:15	Keita 37'; Hilton 61'			Stadium: Stade Félix-Bollaert; Attendance: 39,272; Referee: Alain Sars

14 August 2005 3	Marseille	1–1	Lyon	Marseille
20:45	Taiwo 6'		Carew 35'	Stadium: Stade Vélodrome; Attendance: 57,609; Referee: Laurent Duhamel

20 August 2005 4	Rennes	3–2	Marseille	Rennes
20:00	Utaka 8'; Frei 38'; Källström 54'		Niang 1'; Lamouchi 30'	Stadium: Stade de la Route de Lorient; Attendance: 29,490; Referee: Fredy Fautrel

27 August 2005 5	Marseille	1–1	Ajaccio	Marseille
17:15	Giménez 60'		Saïfi 86' (pen.)	Stadium: Stade Vélodrome; Attendance: 49,203; Referee: Philippe Malige

11 September 2005 6	Sochaux	0–1	Marseille	Montbéliard
20:45			Oruma 66'	Stadium: Stade Auguste Bonal; Attendance: 18,493; Referee: Claude Colombo

18 September 2005 7	Marseille	2–1	Troyes	Marseille
18:00	Ribéry 22'; Lamouchi 35'		Grax 54' (pen.)	Stadium: Stade Vélodrome; Attendance: 47,612; Referee: Philippe Kalt

21 September 2005 8	Toulouse	1–0	Marseille	Toulouse
18:15	Bergougnoux 12'			Stadium: Stadium de Toulouse; Attendance: 27,663; Referee: Hervé Piccirillo

24 September 2005 9	Marseille	3–1	Metz	Marseille
20:00	Déhu 25'; Ribéry 47'; Niang 68'		Renouard 11'	Stadium: Stade Vélodrome; Attendance: 47,287; Referee: Tony Chapron

2 October 2005 10	Nice	0–1	Marseille	Nice
21:00			Ribéry 76'	Stadium: Stade du Ray; Attendance: 14,283; Referee: Stéphane Bré

16 October 2005 11	Marseille	1–0	Paris Saint-Germain	Marseille
21:00	Cana 78'			Stadium: Stade Vélodrome; Attendance: 54,260; Referee: Éric Poulat

23 October 2005 12	Saint-Étienne	2–1	Marseille	Saint-Étienne
20:45	Feindouno 23'; Hellebuyck 84'		Ribéry 35'	Stadium: Stade Geoffroy-Guichard; Attendance: 35,123; Referee: Damien Ledentu

29 October 2005 13	Marseille	1–1	Lille	Marseille
17:15	Koke 29'		Ačimovič 50'	Stadium: Stade Vélodrome; Attendance: 52,929; Referee: Hervé Piccirillo

5 November 2005 14	Le Mans	3–0	Marseille	Le Mans
20:00	Chiumiento 6'; Fanchone 61'; Bangoura 77'			Stadium: Stade Léon-Bollée; Attendance: 16,531; Referee: Thierry Auriac

19 November 2005 15	Marseille	2–1	Nantes	Marseille
17:15	Oruma 28'; Ribéry 72'		Bamogo 50'	Stadium: Stade Vélodrome; Attendance: 48,221; Referee: Stéphane Lannoy

27 November 2005 16	Marseille	2–1	Monaco	Marseille
20:45	Oruma 64'; Lamouchi 76'		Meriem 19'	Stadium: Stade Vélodrome; Attendance: 47,846; Referee: Pascal Garibian

4 December 2005 17	Nancy	1–1	Marseille	Tomblaine
18:00	Zerka 48'		Niang 63'	Stadium: Stade Marcel Picot; Attendance: 20,078; Referee: Olivier Thual

10 December 2005 18	Marseille	1–0	Auxerre	Marseille
20:00	Niang 2'			Stadium: Stade Vélodrome; Attendance: 47,479; Referee: Fredy Fautrel

17 December 2005 19	Strasbourg	0–1	Marseille	Strasbourg
20:00			Niang 60'	Stadium: Stade de la Meinau; Attendance: 26,058; Referee: Damien Ledentu

4 January 2006 20	Marseille	1–1	Lens	Marseille
20:45	Beye 3'		Hilton 76'	Stadium: Stade Vélodrome; Attendance: 36,000; Referee: Claude Colombo

11 January 2006 21	Lyon	2–1	Marseille	Lyon
21:00	Tiago 54'; Malouda 82'		Lamouchi 18'	Stadium: Stade de Gerland; Attendance: 38,912; Referee: Pascal Garibian

15 January 2006 22	Marseille	1–0	Rennes	Marseille
20:45	Pagis 64'			Stadium: Stade Vélodrome; Attendance: 45,211; Referee: Bruno Coué

21 January 2006 23	Ajaccio	3–1	Marseille	Ajaccio
17:15	Lucas 12', 55'; N'Diaye 87'		Pagis 46'	Stadium: Stade François Coty; Attendance: 7,000; Referee: Éric Poulat

28 January 2006 24	Marseille	0–0	Sochaux	Marseille
20:00				Stadium: Stade Vélodrome; Attendance: 46,090; Referee: Olivier Thual

5 February 2006 25	Troyes	0–1	Marseille	Troyes
18:00			Lamouchi 6'	Stadium: Stade de l'Aube; Attendance: 18,860; Referee: Fredy Fautrel

12 February 2006 26	Marseille	0–0	Toulouse	Marseille
18:00				Stadium: Stade Vélodrome; Attendance: 47,092; Referee: Saïd Ennjimi

19 February 2006 27	Metz	1–0	Marseille	Metz
18:00	Gueye 88'			Stadium: Stade Saint-Symphorien; Attendance: 22,689; Referee: Bruno Ruffray

26 February 2006 28	Marseille	1–0	Nice	Marseille
21:00	Maoulida 66'			Stadium: Stade Vélodrome; Attendance: 46,523; Referee: Alain Hamer

5 March 2006 29	Paris Saint-Germain	0–0	Marseille	Paris
17:00				Stadium: Parc des Princes; Attendance: 43,906; Referee: Alain Sars

12 March 2006 30	Marseille	2–0	Saint-Étienne	Marseille
21:00	Pagis 16', 19'			Stadium: Stade Vélodrome; Attendance: 53,103; Referee: Philippe Kalt

19 March 2006 31	Lille	0–0	Marseille	Villeneuve-d'Ascq
17:30				Stadium: Stadium Lille-Metropole; Attendance: 17,274; Referee: Bertrand Layec

25 March 2006 32	Marseille	1–1	Le Mans	Marseille
20:00	Maoulida 23'		Fanchone 35'	Stadium: Stade Vélodrome; Attendance: 49,395; Referee: Hervé Piccirillo

1 April 2006 33	Nantes	1–3	Marseille	Nantes
20:00	Oliech 57'		Niang 25', 75'; Maoulida 55'	Stadium: Stade de la Beaujoire; Attendance: 37,000; Referee: Philippe Malige

8 April 2006 34	Monaco	1–0	Marseille	Monaco
20:00	Chevantón 27'			Stadium: Stade Louis II; Attendance: 17,596; Referee: Stéphane Lannoy

15 April 2006 35	Marseille	6–0	Nancy	Marseille
20:00	Niang 12', 33'; Maoulida 53', 64'; Pagis 88', 90'			Stadium: Stade Vélodrome; Attendance: 51,365; Referee: Bruno Ruffray

3 May 2006 36	Auxerre	1–2	Marseille	Auxerre
20:45	Mignot 76'		Niang 15'; Civelli 63'	Stadium: Stade de l'Abbé-Deschamps; Attendance: 18,409; Referee: Éric Poulat

6 May 2006 37	Marseille	2–2	Strasbourg	Marseille
20:00	Nasri 47'; Ribéry 72'		Abdessadki 51'; Carlier 67'	Stadium: Stade Vélodrome; Attendance: 55,680; Referee: Thierry Auriac

13 May 2006 38	Bordeaux	1–1	Marseille	Bordeaux
20:00	Fernando 88'		Maoulida 76'	Stadium: Stade Chaban-Delmas; Attendance: 32,765; Referee: Stéphane Bré

=== Coupe de France ===
8 January 2006 Round of 64	Marseille	4–0	Le Havre	Marseille
18:30	Maoulida 55'; Oruma 61'; Ribéry 64', 80' (pen.)			Stadium: Stade Vélodrome; Attendance: 18,000; Referee: Thierry Auriac

1 February 2006 Round of 32	Marseille	2–0	Metz	Marseille
20:45	Pagis 8'; Giménez 90+2'			Stadium: Stade Vélodrome; Attendance: 7,908; Referee: Bruno Derrien

22 March 2006 Round of 16	Marseille	2–0	Sochaux	Marseille
17:00	Maoulida 77', 85'			Stadium: Stade Vélodrome; Attendance: 14,515; Referee: Tony Chapron

11 April 2006 Quarter-finals	Lyon	1–2	Marseille	Lyon
21:00	Fred 21'		Maoulida 17'; Niang 65'	Stadium: Stade de Gerland; Attendance: 38,885; Referee: Bertrand Layec

20 April 2006 Semi-finals	Marseille	3–0	Rennes	Marseille
17:00	Ribéry 1'; Taiwo 19'; Niang 45'			Stadium: Stade Vélodrome; Attendance: 57,000; Referee: Hervé Piccirillo

29 April 2006 Final	Marseille	1–2	Paris Saint-Germain	Saint-Denis
20:45	Maoulida 67'		Kalou 5'; Dhorasoo 49'	Stadium: Stade de France; Attendance: 79,061; Referee: Laurent Duhamel

=== Coupe de la Ligue ===
26 October 2005 Second round	Bordeaux	1–0	Marseille	Bordeaux
17:00 CEST (UTC+2)	Meite 85' (o.g.)			Stadium: Stade Chaban-Delmas; Attendance: 26,614; Referee: Laurent Duhamel

=== Intertoto Cup ===
==== Third round ====
16 July 2005 First leg	Young Boys (Switzerland)	2–3	(France) Marseille	Bern, Switzerland
	Raimondi 61'; Yakin 74'		Oruma 15'; Niang 35'; Taiwo 82'	Stadium: Stade de Suisse; Attendance: 14,000; Referee: Craig Thomson (Scotland)

23 July 2005 Second leg	Marseille (France)	2–1 (5–3 agg.)	(Switzerland) Young Boys	Marseille, France
	Luyindula 70' (pen.); Nasri 83'		Raimondi 43'	Stadium: Stade Vélodrome; Attendance: 28,000; Referee: Ivan Bebek (Croatia)

==== Semi–finals ====
27 July 2005 First leg	Lazio (Italy)	1–1	(France) Marseille	Rome, Italy
21:00	Di Canio 42'	Report	Méïté 70'	Stadium: Stadio Olimpico; Attendance: 31,000; Referee: Carlos Megía Dávila (Spain)

3 August 2005 Second leg	Marseille (France)	3–0 (4–1 agg.)	(Italy) Lazio	Marseille, France
21:00	Niang 60'; Mendoza 61'; Ribéry 65'	Report		Stadium: Stade Vélodrome; Attendance: 53,000; Referee: António Costa (Portugal)

==== Final ====
9 August 2005 First leg	Deportivo La Coruña (Spain)	2–0	(France) Marseille	A Coruña, Spain
21:00	Rubén 68'; Iván Carril 87'	Report		Stadium: Estadio Riazor; Attendance: 10,000; Referee: Jaroslav Jara (Czech Republic)

23 August 2005 Second leg	Marseille (France)	5–1 (5–3 agg.)	(Spain) Deportivo La Coruña	Marseille, France
21:00	Ribéry 5'; Méïté 65'; Niang 74', 88'; Oruma 90+3'	Report	Andrade 9'	Stadium: Stade Vélodrome; Attendance: 50,000; Referee: Nikolai Ivanov (Russia)

=== UEFA Cup ===
==== First round ====
15 September 2005 First leg	Germinal Beerschot (Belgium)	0–0	(France) Marseille	Antwerp, Belgium
20:30		Report		Stadium: Olympisch Stadion; Attendance: 12,150; Referee: Alberto Undiano Mallenco (Spain)

29 September 2005 Second leg	Marseille (France)	0–0 (a.e.t.) (0–0 agg.) (4–1 p)	(Belgium) Germinal Beerschot	Marseille, France
21:00		Report		Stadium: Stade Vélodrome; Attendance: 25,000; Referee: Michael Weiner (Germany)
	Penalties
	Giménez (penalty scored); André Luís (penalty scored); Taiwo (penalty scored); Nasri (penalty scored)		(penalty missed) Öztürk; (penalty scored) Chimedza; (penalty missed) Agyeman

==== Group stage ====
Pos	Team	Pld	W	D	L	GF	GA	GD	Pts	Qualification
1	(France) Marseille	4	3	0	1	5	3	+2	9	Advance to knockout stage
2	(Bulgaria) Levski Sofia	4	2	0	2	4	4	0	6	Advance to knockout stage
3	(Netherlands) Heerenveen	4	1	2	1	2	2	0	5	Advance to knockout stage
4	(Russia) CSKA Moscow	4	1	1	2	3	4	−1	4	
5	(Romania) Dinamo București	4	1	1	2	2	3	−1	4	

20 October 2005 1	CSKA Moscow (Russia)	1–2	(France) Marseille	Moscow, Russia
17:30	Vágner Love 80'	Report	Lamouchi 23'; Niang 38'	Stadium: Dynamo Stadium; Attendance: 22,500; Referee: Kristinn Jakobsson (Iceland)

24 November 2005 2	Marseille (France)	1–0	(Netherlands) Heerenveen	Marseille, France
20:45	Taiwo 88' (pen.)	Report		Stadium: Stade Vélodrome; Attendance: 25,000; Referee: João Ferreira (Portugal)

1 December 2005 3	Levski Sofia (Bulgaria)	1–0	(France) Marseille	Sofia, Bulgaria
18:30	Yovov 54'	Report		Stadium: Georgi Asparuhov Stadium; Attendance: 12,000; Referee: Nicolai Vollquartz (Denmark)

14 December 2005 4	Marseille (France)	2–1	(Romania) Dinamo București	Marseille, France
20:45	Cesar 38'; Delfim 45'	Report	Niculescu 51'	Stadium: Stade Vélodrome; Attendance: 19,500; Referee: Julián Rodríguez Santiago (Spain)

==== Knockout phase ====
===== Round of 32 =====
15 February 2006 First leg	Bolton Wanderers (England)	0–0	(France) Marseille	Bolton, England
20:45		Report		Stadium: Reebok Stadium; Attendance: 19,288; Referee: Olegário Benquerença (Portugal)

23 February 2006 Second leg	Marseille (France)	2–1 (2–1 agg.)	(England) Bolton Wanderers	Marseille, France
20:45	Ribéry 45+2'; Ben Haim 68' (o.g.)	Report	Giannakopoulos 25'	Stadium: Stade Vélodrome; Attendance: 38,351; Referee: Massimo Busacca (Switzerland)

===== Round of 16 =====
9 March 2006 First leg	Marseille (France)	0–1	(Russia) Zenit Saint Petersburg	Marseille, France
20:45		Report	Arshavin 51'	Stadium: Stade Vélodrome; Attendance: 25,000; Referee: Luis Medina Cantalejo (Spain)

16 March 2006 Second leg	Zenit Saint Petersburg (Russia)	1–1 (2–1 agg.)	(France) Marseille	Saint Petersburg, Russia
17:00	Kerzhakov 69'	Report	Déhu 74'	Stadium: Petrovsky Stadium; Attendance: 21,838; Referee: Herbert Fandel (Germany)

== Sources ==
LFP.fr 2005-2006
