= Lorik Cana =

Albanian footballer (born 1983)

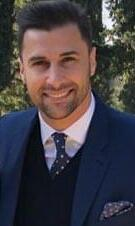
- Lorik Cana, 2021

Personal information
- Full name: Lorik Agim Cana
- Date of birth: 27 July 1983 (age 43)
- Place of birth: Pristina, Kosovo
- Height: 1.86 m (6 ft 1 in)
- Positions: Centre-back; defensive midfielder; central midfielder

Youth career
- 1995–2000: Lausanne-Sport
- 2000–2001: Paris Saint-Germain

Senior career*
Years	Team	Apps	(Gls)
2000–2003	Paris Saint-Germain B	39	(2)
2002–2005	Paris Saint-Germain	69	(2)
2005–2009	Marseille	122	(6)
2009–2010	Sunderland	31	(0)
2010–2011	Galatasaray	24	(1)
2011–2015	Lazio	82	(4)
2015–2016	Nantes	21	(0)
Total		388	(15)

International career
2002–2016	Albania	94 (Note: This includes two friendly matches against the Kosovo national team in 2002 and 2015. As Kosovo was not affiliated with either UEFA or FIFA at the time, these matches are not recognised as official internationals.)	(1)
- * Club domestic league appearances and goals

Lorik Agim Cana (Albanian pronunciation: [ˈlɔɾik ˈtsana]; born 27 July 1983) is an Albanian former professional footballer who played as a centre-back or midfielder. Known for his physicality, leadership and tactical versatility, Cana was capable of operating in both defensive midfield and central defence, qualities that made him a key figure for several clubs and the Albania national team. He is currently the Grassroots ambassador for children's football in Albania, a role appointed by the Albanian Football Association in October 2017. Born in Pristina, Yugoslavia, he represented the Albania national team.

Cana played in the top divisions of France, England, Italy and Turkey, representing Paris Saint-Germain, Marseille, Sunderland, Galatasaray, Lazio and Nantes. He was recognised for his combative style, defensive ability and leadership qualities, which allowed him to adapt to different roles throughout his career. At the age of 16, he was invited for a trial with Arsenal but was unable to attend after being denied a British visa. He began his senior career with Paris Saint-Germain, winning the 2003–04 Coupe de France, before joining Marseille in 2005, where he became club captain in 2007. Initially deployed as a defensive midfielder or central midfielder, he later established himself as a centre-back, demonstrating tactical flexibility and leadership on the pitch. In 2009, Cana signed for Sunderland, becoming the first player of Albanian origin to compete in the Premier League, and was immediately appointed captain. He later played for Galatasaray before spending four seasons with Lazio, where he won the 2012–13 Coppa Italia. He concluded his club career with Nantes after returning to France in 2015.

Eligible to represent Albania, Switzerland or France through his three passports, Cana chose Albania and made his senior international debut in 2003 at the age of 19. He became national team captain in 2011 and retired after UEFA Euro 2016, finishing with 94 appearances, setting Albania's appearance record, which stood until 2025 when it was surpassed by Elseid Hysaj.

== Club career ==
=== Early career ===
Cana was born in Pristina, Kosovo, to Albanian parents, with his father Agim having represented Prishtina during one of the club's most successful periods in the 1980s. Due to his father's career abroad, Cana spent part of his childhood in Austria, Croatia and Turkey before the family eventually settled in Lausanne, Switzerland, following the Samsunspor bus accident in 1989 and the outbreak of the Yugoslav Wars in 1990, which affected the wider Cana family. In Lausanne, Cana joined the youth academy of Lausanne-Sport in 1995, beginning his football development and continuing the family's connection with the sport established by his father.

In 2000, after impressing at a youth tournament in Spain, Cana attracted interest from Real Madrid, Paris Saint-Germain and Arsenal, with the latter inviting him for a trial at the age of 16, although he was unable to attend after being denied a British visa. He later spent a week on trial with Paris Saint-Germain, where reserve team coach Antoine Kombouaré was impressed by his performances. The club subsequently signed him for its youth academy and assisted with regularising his immigration status in France, allowing his family to join him after the end of the Kosovo War.

Cana progressed through Paris' youth system to the reserve team, competing in the fourth-tier Championnat de France Amateur, where he made four appearances during the 2000–01 season before a knee injury interrupted his progress. He returned the following year, making 12 appearances and scoring his first goal, before becoming a regular in the reserve side during the 2002–03 season, when he made 21 appearances and scored once as the team won Group A and secured promotion to the Championnat National.

=== Paris Saint-Germain ===
In April 2003, Cana was called up to train with the Paris first team by head coach Luis Fernández, as the club had little left to play for in the closing stages of the season. With several senior players rested, he made his professional debut on 19 April, playing the full match and providing an assist in a 1–1 away draw against Nantes on matchday 34 of the Ligue 1 season. He made two further league appearances, receiving one yellow card, as PSG finished the campaign in 11th place.

In the 2003–04 season, Cana was initially used as a substitute in the opening Ligue 1 matches in August before establishing himself as a regular starter under head coach Vahid Halilhodžić, forming a defensive midfield partnership with fellow youngster Modeste M'bami. Despite their limited experience, the duo played an important role in PSG's successful campaign, with Cana making 32 league appearances, most of them as a full-match starter, while collecting nine yellow cards and one dismissal for two bookable offences, reflecting his aggressive and combative style of play. He scored his first professional goal on 29 February 2004, finding the equaliser in the 80th minute of a 1–1 away draw against Auxerre after Djibril Cissé had given the hosts the lead in the first half.

PSG finished the league season as runners-up, three points behind champions Lyon and one point ahead of Monaco, who had reached the 2004 UEFA Champions League final, securing direct qualification for the UEFA Champions League group stage. The team also recorded the second-best defensive record in the league, conceding 28 goals, only two more than Lyon. In the Coupe de France, Cana played the full 120 minutes in PSG's 2–1 extra-time victory away to Marseille in the tenth round on 24 January 2004. He also featured in the round of 16 and played every minute of both the semi-final and final, as PSG defeated Châteauroux 1–0 on 29 May to win the competition.

In the following 2004–05 season, Cana made his UEFA Champions League debut on 14 September 2004 in PSG's opening group-stage match, a 3–0 home defeat against Chelsea. He started all six group-stage matches and played every minute of the campaign. Cana helped PSG keep clean sheets in goalless draws against defending champions Porto and Chelsea, although the team struggled offensively, scoring only once during the group stage and finishing bottom of Group H without a victory.

On 22 September 2004, Cana scored his first goal of the season, opening the scoring just before half-time in a 2–2 away draw against Lens on the seventh matchday of Ligue 1. He remained a regular starter throughout the league campaign, playing most available minutes, but PSG struggled to replicate the consistency of the previous season, recording six wins, nine draws and six defeats in their opening 21 league matches while also being eliminated in the round of 16 of the Coupe de la Ligue in December. After a poor run of results left PSG in 12th place, Halilhodžić was dismissed on 8 February 2005, shortly after a 2–0 home defeat against Lens. Halilhodžić later praised Cana's mentality, describing him as the hardest-working player he had ever coached.

Under assistant coach Laurent Fournier, Cana continued to feature regularly during the remainder of the season. He started the Coupe de France round of 32 against Bordeaux on 13 February 2005, playing 80 minutes before being substituted with PSG trailing 1–0, although the team eventually recovered to win 3–1 after extra time. He finished the league campaign with 32 appearances, nine yellow cards and one dismissal for two bookable offences, as PSG ended the season in ninth place, four points behind fourth-placed Rennes and nine above the relegation zone.

At the start of the 2005–06 Ligue 1 season, Fournier remained in charge, but Cana's playing time decreased after he lost his starting place to new signing Vikash Dhorasoo, a UEFA Champions League finalist, making only two appearances in PSG's opening four league matches. He left PSG in late August 2005 after the club agreed his transfer to Marseille.

=== Olympique de Marseille ===
In August 2005, Cana joined Marseille, signing a three- or four-year contract for a reported transfer fee of €3–4 million. His arrival formed part of a major squad rebuild, with Marseille also signing players including Mamadou Niang, Franck Ribéry, Wilson Oruma, Sabri Lamouchi and Taye Taiwo, while Mickaël Pagis joined midway through the season, helping establish the foundations of a side that became increasingly competitive in domestic and European competitions over the following years.

==== Early years and emergence as a key figure (2005–2007) ====
Cana made his Marseille debut on the fifth matchday of the league campaign, playing the full match in a 1–1 away draw against Ajaccio, and subsequently became a regular starter under head coach Jean Fernandez. The booking he received in the match brought his season total to three yellow cards, including those carried over from PSG, resulting in a one-match suspension. On 16 October, he scored his first goal for Marseille against PSG, heading in from a free kick in the 78th minute to secure a 1–0 victory over his former club. He later described the goal as an important moment in gaining acceptance from Marseille supporters after his move from PSG. He finished the league campaign with 28 appearances, completing every match he played, and 13 yellow cards, with several suspensions, as Marseille finished fifth, level on points with Lens but behind on head-to-head record, and qualified for the UEFA Intertoto Cup third round.

In the Coupe de France, Cana started all six matches, being substituted twice after Marseille had established comfortable leads, as the club eliminated reigning champions Lyon 2–1 in the quarter-finals before reaching the final, where they lost 2–1 to PSG. He also appeared in the Coupe de la Ligue, coming on as a 29th-minute substitute in a 1–0 away defeat to Bordeaux in the first round on 26 October 2005.

In the UEFA Cup, Cana played in both legs of the first-round tie against Beerschot in September 2005, starting the goalless first leg away from home and appearing as a substitute in the return leg, which Marseille won on penalties. He made three appearances in the group stage, as Marseille recorded wins over CSKA Moscow and Dinamo București and finished top of the group. In the knockout stage, he started both legs against Bolton Wanderers as Marseille advanced 2–1 on aggregate, before missing the first leg of the round of 16 against Zenit Saint Petersburg through suspension and returning for the second leg, which ended in a 1–1 draw as Marseille were eliminated 2–1 on aggregate.

In the 2006–07 season, Cana remained a regular starter under head coach Albert Emon, making 33 Ligue 1 appearances, being substituted only four times and scoring twice, while receiving eight yellow cards as Marseille finished runners-up to Lyon with 64 points. On 29 April 2007, he scored his first league goal of the season, equalising in the 13th minute of a 4–2 comeback victory over Sochaux.

Cana also featured in Marseille's UEFA Cup campaign, starting the first leg of the second qualifying round against Young Boys on 10 August 2006, a 3–3 draw away from home, but missing the return leg through suspension as Marseille advanced. In the first round, he came on at half-time in the first leg against Mladá Boleslav, a 1–0 home victory, before starting the second leg away from home, where Marseille lost 4–2 and were eliminated from the competition.

Cana started every Coupe de France match, playing 120 minutes in both the round of 64 and round of 32 as Marseille required extra time to advance before winning the subsequent rounds in normal time and reaching the final. In the final against Sochaux on 12 May 2007, he played the full 120 minutes, scored Marseille's third penalty in the shoot-out and saw the club lose 5–4 on penalties after the match had ended 2–2.

His consistent performances during his first two seasons at Marseille established him as a regular and influential midfielder, with contemporary assessments noting his contribution beyond his combative style of play.

==== Captaincy and European campaigns (2007–2009) ====
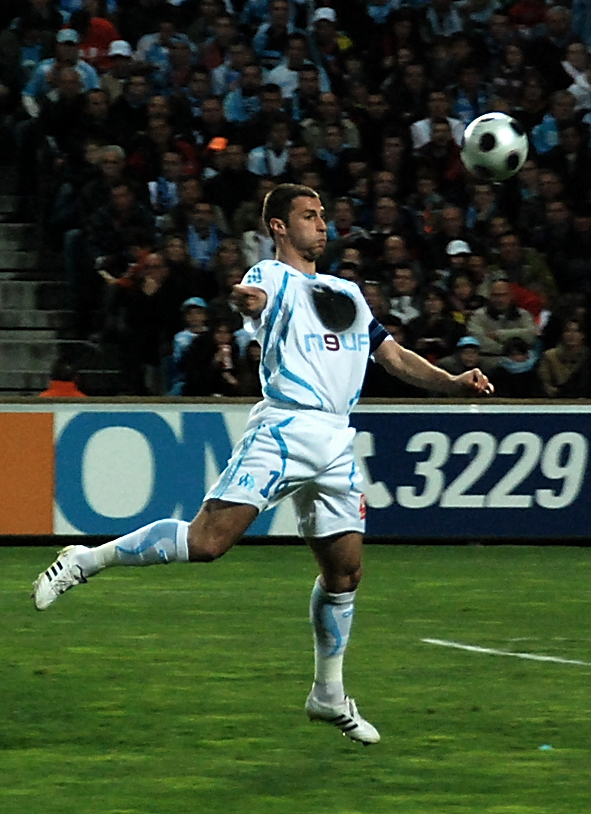
Cana playing for Marseille in 2008

Following Habib Beye's transfer to Newcastle United in the summer of 2007, Cana was appointed club captain ahead of the 2007–08 season. His leadership and combative style made him a prominent figure within the team, with contemporary reports highlighting his role both on and off the pitch.

Cana started all six matches during Marseille's Champions League group stage, as Marseille won their opening two fixtures, including a 1–0 victory over reigning runners-up Liverpool at Anfield, becoming the first French club to win at the stadium. Cana later recalled the victory as one of the notable moments of his European career, describing it as Eric Gerets' first match in charge after the Belgian coach had held individual meetings with each player on the eve of the game. After a draw in the following group match, Marseille lost their remaining fixtures and finished third in the group, dropping into the UEFA Cup round of 32.

In the UEFA Cup, Cana started both round-of-32 matches against Spartak Moscow, as Marseille progressed 3–2 on aggregate despite losing the second leg 2–0. He received bookings in both matches and consequently missed the first leg of the round of 16 against Zenit Saint Petersburg, which Marseille won 3–1 in his absence. He returned for the second leg, but a 2–0 defeat in Russia saw Marseille eliminated on away goals, with Zenit subsequently winning the competition.

On 1 March 2008, Cana scored his second league goal for Marseille, opening the scoring in a 2–1 victory over Auxerre. During the latter part of the campaign, he was also deployed occasionally as a centre-back. He made 34 appearances in Ligue 1, completing the full 90 minutes in all but one match, as Marseille finished third and qualified for the following season's UEFA Champions League.

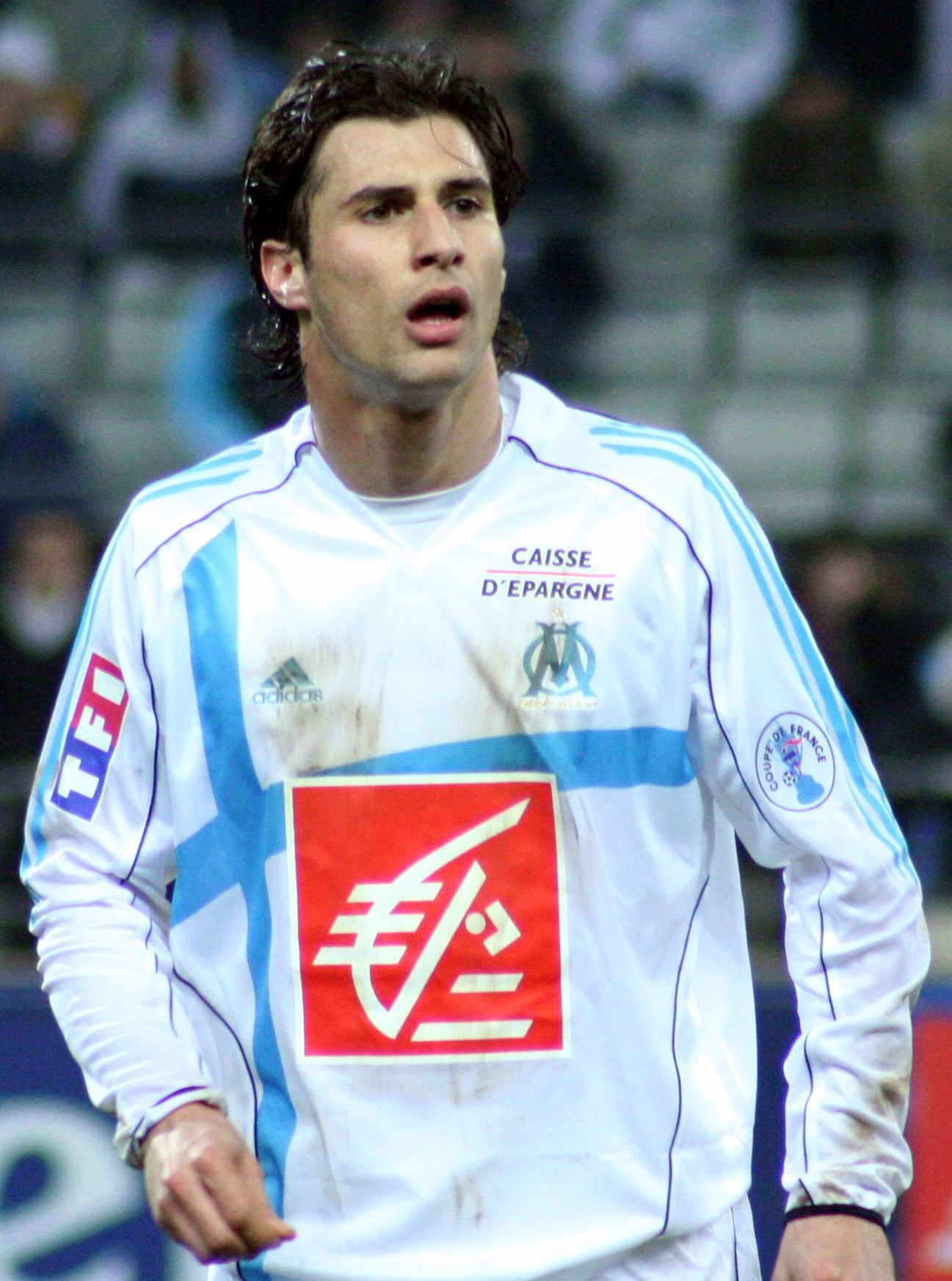
Cana with Marseille in 2009

Cana retained the captaincy for the 2008–09 season, primarily operating as a defensive midfielder alongside Benoît Cheyrou, although he was occasionally deployed in defence; across all competitions, he made 39 appearances, scored two goals, provided one assist and accumulated 3,224 minutes of playing time. On 16 September 2008, Cana scored his first Champions League goal, opening the scoring in the 20th minute against Liverpool in Marseille's opening group-stage match, although the visitors recovered to win 2–1 through a Steven Gerrard brace.

After an inconsistent first half of the season, Cana regained his form during the second half of the campaign. In the Champions League group stage, he started all six matches as Marseille earned their first points with a 3–0 victory over PSV and secured third place with a goalless draw against Atlético Madrid on the final matchday, qualifying for the UEFA Cup round of 32. In the UEFA Cup, Cana missed the first leg against Twente but returned for the second leg as Marseille progressed on penalties after a 1–1 aggregate draw. He then started the first leg of the round of 16 against Ajax, with Marseille progressing to the quarter-finals, where Cana featured in both matches against Shakhtar Donetsk, eventually losing 4–1 on aggregate.

Marseille remained in the Ligue 1 title race until the closing weeks of the season, but a 3–1 defeat to Lyon on 17 May 2009 effectively ended their challenge, with Bordeaux eventually winning the championship by three points. Cana left Marseille in July 2009 to join English Premier League club Sunderland, ending a four-year spell at the club that he later described as "four fantastic, unforgettable years", adding that Marseille would "always" remain his club.

=== Sunderland ===
Cana joined Sunderland on a four-year contract on 24 July 2009 for a reported fee of around £5 million. Shortly after his arrival, manager Steve Bruce appointed him as captain, although the club had not yet officially confirmed its permanent captain at the time. He made his Premier League debut on 15 August 2009, playing the full 90 minutes in a 1–0 away victory over Bolton Wanderers and becoming the first Albanian footballer to appear in the competition. Cana quickly established himself as a regular starter, although his combative style also resulted in several suspensions during the campaign. Bruce officially confirmed him as Sunderland's permanent captain for the 2009–10 season on 3 September 2009. On 17 October 2009, he captained Sunderland to a 1–0 home victory over Liverpool, the club's first league win against Liverpool since December 2002.

In domestic cup competitions, Cana featured in both League Cup matches, helping Sunderland reach the fourth round before being eliminated by Aston Villa after extra time. He also started both FA Cup fixtures as the club defeated Barrow before being eliminated by Portsmouth in the fourth round. On 9 March 2010, he provided the assist for Fraizer Campbell's opening goal in Sunderland's 4–0 league victory over Bolton. Despite missing three league matches through a groin injury late in the season, he finished the Premier League campaign with 31 appearances as Sunderland placed 13th.

=== Galatasaray ===
"Joining the Turkish side was a difficult decision but one made partly to be closer to his family. 'This was not an easy decision... I hope people understand.'"

— Cana during his presentation at Galatasaray.

On 8 July 2010, Cana joined Galatasaray of the Süper Lig for a reported transfer fee of €4.5 million. He later cited the opportunity to compete in European competition and to be closer to his family among the reasons for the move. Cana signed a four-year contract reportedly worth €2 million per season, with additional appearance-related bonuses. He made his debut on 29 July 2010, entering as a substitute in a 2–2 draw against OFK Beograd in the first leg of the UEFA Europa League third qualifying round. He started the return leg, a 5–1 Galatasaray victory, as the club advanced 7–3 on aggregate. He made his league debut on the opening matchday of the 2010–11 Süper Lig season against Sivasspor. During the early part of the season, manager Frank Rijkaard used him on a rotational basis. He also featured in the Europa League play-off against Karpaty Lviv, as Galatasaray were eliminated on away goals following a 3–3 aggregate draw. Rijkaard was dismissed on 20 October 2010 following an inconsistent start to the league campaign.

Following the appointment of Gheorghe Hagi as manager, Cana became a regular starter before an ankle injury in November temporarily sidelined him. He was sent off in stoppage time during a 1–0 victory over Konyaspor on 19 December 2010. By the winter break he had accumulated three yellow cards and one red card, making him one of the league's most frequently booked players. Despite Galatasaray's difficult season, Cana earned praise from supporters for his commitment and leadership, later stating that he tried to motivate his teammates both on the pitch and in the dressing room. Cana scored his first goal for Galatasaray on 6 February 2011, opening the scoring in a 4–2 home victory over Eskişehirspor. He also made four appearances in the Turkish Cup, in which Galatasaray reached the quarter-finals. Hagi was dismissed on 23 March 2011 following a run of poor results. Under interim manager Bülent Ünder, Cana retained his place in the starting line-up, although a knee injury sustained in April limited his appearances during the closing weeks of the season; he finished the league campaign with 24 appearances as Galatasaray placed eighth and failed to qualify for European competition.

Following the election of club president Ünal Aysal and the return of Fatih Terim as head coach, Turkish media reported that Cana was among several foreign players expected to leave as part of a squad restructuring.

=== Lazio ===
On 3 July 2011, Cana joined Italian Serie A club Lazio as part of the transfer that sent Fernando Muslera to Galatasaray, with Lazio paying an additional €800,000. He signed a five-year contract running until June 2016 and was reportedly set to earn €1.7 million per season. The transfer followed several months of negotiations, with head coach Edy Reja identifying Cana's experience and versatility as factors in the club's decision to sign him. Sporting director Igli Tare, who had followed Cana for several months, was also involved in the negotiations. Cana became Lazio's seventh signing of the summer transfer window as the club continued to reinforce its squad ahead of its 2011–12 UEFA Europa League campaign, which it would begin in the play-off round.

==== Establishment, positional transition and Coppa Italia triumph (2011–2013) ====
Cana initially struggled to establish himself as a regular starter under coach Reja, who considered using him in both midfield and defence because of his versatility. He made his competitive debut on 25 August 2011, playing the full match at centre-back in Lazio's 3–1 away victory over Rabotnički in the second leg of the UEFA Europa League play-off round, as Lazio advanced to the group stage with a 9–1 aggregate victory. His Serie A debut followed on 21 September, when he came on as a late substitute in a 2–1 away victory over Cesena. Ahead of Lazio's decisive Europa League group-stage fixtures, Reja identified Cana among the experienced players expected to contribute to the club's qualification campaign. Cana started five of Lazio's six group-stage matches, completing the full 90 minutes in four, as the club collected seven points from its final three fixtures without conceding a goal and finished second in Group D to reach the round of 32. On 10 December, he scored his first goal for Lazio, one minute after coming on as a substitute in a 3–2 away victory over Lecce.

On 31 January 2012, Lazio announced that Cana would be sidelined for approximately six weeks after sustaining a back injury in training. Following his return, he gradually regained a place in the starting line-up and featured more frequently during the final months of the season. On 6 May, he scored his second goal of the season with a long-range strike in a 2–0 victory over Atalanta, a result that kept Lazio in contention for UEFA Champions League qualification. In his debut season, Cana made 20 appearances in all competitions, featuring in both midfield and defence, as Lazio finished fourth in Serie A and qualified for the 2012–13 UEFA Europa League.

During the 2012–13 season, manager Vladimir Petković converted Cana into a regular centre-back, a positional change that was widely praised by the Italian media. Petković highlighted Cana's leadership and ability to organise the defence as important factors in his adaptation to the role. In the Europa League group stage, Cana featured in four matches, completing three, as Lazio remained unbeaten and finished top of Group J to advance to the round of 32. He featured in both legs of the round of 32 as Lazio defeated Borussia Mönchengladbach 5–3 on aggregate, including a 2–0 second-leg victory on 21 February 2013 that earned him a place in the UEFA Europa League Team of the Week. He started the first leg of the round of 16 against VfB Stuttgart, helping Lazio to a 2–0 victory, but was suspended for the return leg after receiving a yellow card; Lazio progressed to the quarter-finals, where Cana started both matches before the club was eliminated 3–1 on aggregate by Fenerbahçe. In domestic competitions, he alternated between the starting line-up and the bench, making 24 appearances in Serie A and five in the Coppa Italia. On 26 May 2013, Cana started at centre-back in the Coppa Italia final, the first major final between the two Rome rivals, as Lazio defeated Roma 1–0 at the Stadio Olimpico to win their sixth Coppa Italia title. The victory secured qualification for the UEFA Europa League group stage and represented Cana's first major honour with Lazio.

==== Reduced role and third-place finish ====
In the 2013–14 UEFA Europa League, Cana started Lazio's first five group-stage matches during autumn 2013, helping the club record three wins and two draws while keeping three clean sheets, securing qualification for the round of 32 with one match to spare. He was rested for the final group-stage fixture, a goalless draw against Trabzonspor, as Lazio remained unbeaten and finished second in Group J, two points behind the Turkish side. On 24 November 2013, Cana scored his first goal of the season, netting a stoppage-time equaliser in a 1–1 away draw against Sampdoria and denying Siniša Mihajlović victory in his first match as the club's manager.

In January 2014, Cana was ranked among Serie A's top five defenders for ball recoveries, with reports highlighting his performances against players from several of the league's leading clubs. Following Edy Reja's return in early 2014, Cana temporarily lost his place in the starting line-up as the coach restored his preferred 4–1–4–1 formation and initially opted for the experienced central defensive pairing of Biava and André Dias, both of whom had fallen out of favour under Petković. He consequently spent several matches on the bench while continuing to feature regularly as a substitute. On 20 February 2014, Cana started the first leg of Lazio's Europa League round of 32 tie against Ludogorets, where an early penalty was awarded for handball against him despite replays appearing to show that his arm was close to his body, a decision criticised by the Italian media; Etrit Berisha saved the resulting penalty, but Lazio nevertheless suffered a 1–0 home defeat. He did not feature in the second leg as Lazio drew 3–3 in Bulgaria and were eliminated 4–3 on aggregate. On 2 March 2014, Cana scored his second goal of the season with a bicycle kick after five minutes to secure a 1–0 away victory over Fiorentina. He regained his place in the starting line-up during the closing months of the campaign, finishing the Serie A season with 26 appearances as Lazio placed ninth and failed to qualify for European competition.

Cana's playing time became increasingly limited during the 2014–15 season following the arrivals of defenders Stefan de Vrij and Santiago Gentiletti, who became the preferred centre-back pairing under Stefano Pioli. He nevertheless started Lazio's opening Serie A match against Milan, playing the full 90 minutes in a 3–1 away defeat. He returned to the starting line-up in September after Gentiletti suffered an injury, featuring in three consecutive league matches from matchday four. On 5 October 2014, Cana was sent off after receiving a second yellow card and conceding a penalty for a foul on Domenico Berardi during a 3–2 home victory over Sassuolo. Berardi converted the resulting penalty to reduce the deficit before Lazio held on for the victory. On 7 December, he made his 100th appearance for Lazio, coming on as a substitute in a 2–1 away victory over Parma. Cana remained a regular squad member despite his reduced role, making 17 appearances in Serie A, as Lazio finished third in the standings and qualified for the 2015–16 UEFA Champions League play-off round, marking the club's return to the Champions League after an eight-year absence.

In the Coppa Italia, Cana started Lazio's opening two matches, playing the full 90 minutes in victories over Bassano Virtus and Varese as the club progressed with a combined score of 10–0. He returned to the starting line-up for the quarter-final against Milan on 27 January 2015, but was sent off shortly before half-time after receiving a second yellow card, although Lazio held on for a 1–0 away victory to reach the semi-finals. His performances over the course of the season were described as solid despite occasional mistakes, reflecting his determined and combative style. Cana left Lazio at the end of the season after four years with the club, with his representatives confirming that he would seek a new challenge.

=== Nantes ===
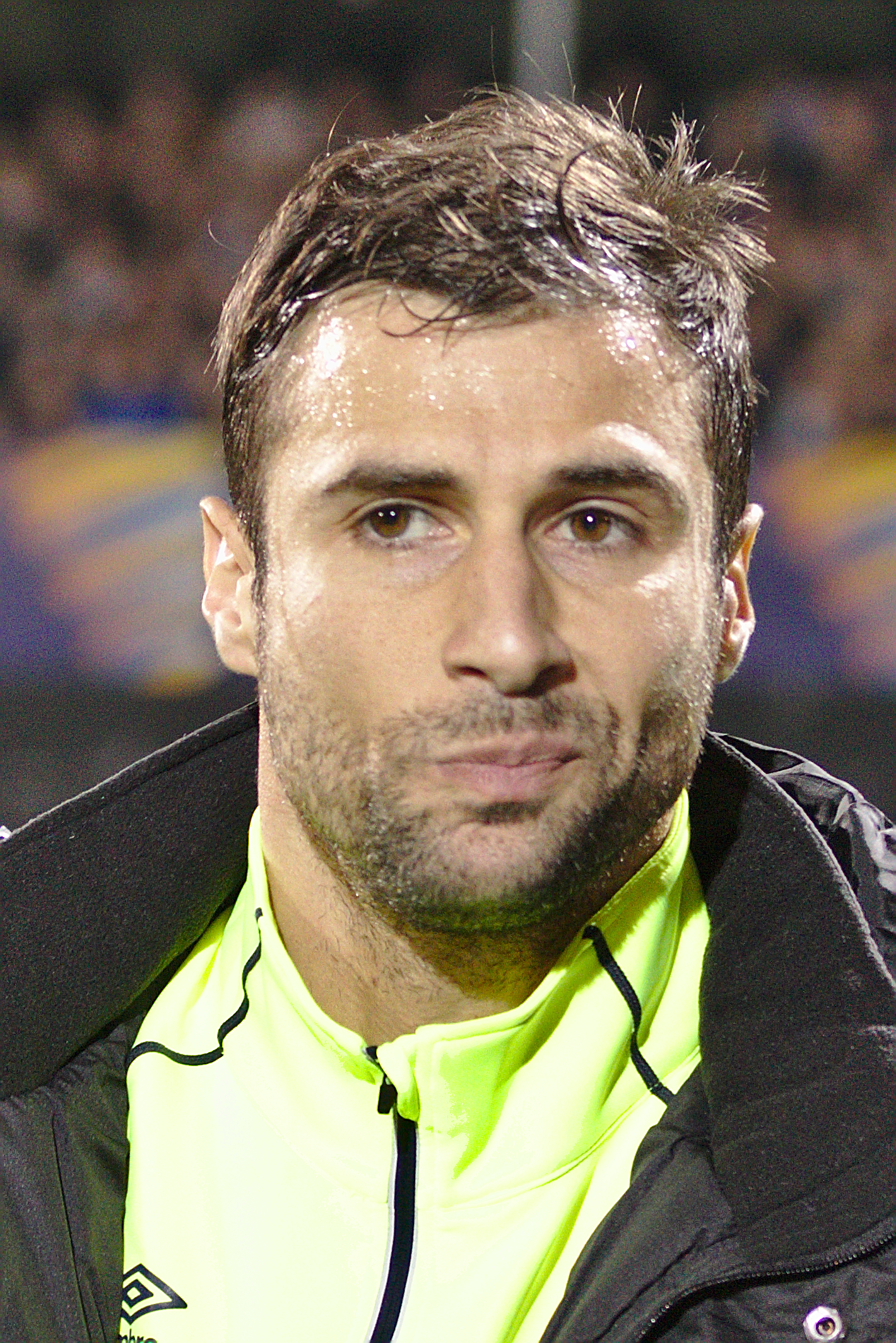
Cana with Nantes in 2015

Cana officially joined Nantes on 31 August 2015, signing a two-year contract and returning to Ligue 1. He made his competitive debut on 13 September, starting in a 2–0 home defeat to Rennes on the fifth matchday of the Ligue 1 season. Cana established himself as a regular starter in defence, making 21 Ligue 1 appearances, 20 of them as a starter, despite missing several matches and receiving five yellow cards. On 21 November 2015, he made his 200th appearance in the French top flight during a 1–0 away defeat to Monaco. Cana was rested for several league matches between December 2015 and January 2016 under an agreed plan to recover from accumulated fatigue following his continued involvement with both Nantes and the Albania national team, while also managing his workload ahead of UEFA Euro 2016. In the 2015–16 Coupe de France, which took place during the first three months of 2016, Cana captained Nantes and featured in all three matches during the club's run to the quarter-finals, with each match played away from home and decided after extra time. In the round of 16 against Bordeaux on 10 February 2016, his headed assist from a corner allowed Alejandro Bedoya to score the winning goal in the 118th minute, completing Nantes' comeback in a 4–3 victory. Nantes were eliminated in the quarter-finals on 2 March after a 3–2 extra-time defeat to Sochaux.

Cana left Nantes in August 2016 after one season with the club, ending his contract by mutual agreement. He remained without a club after effectively ending his playing career shortly after Euro 2016 with Albania due to heart-related health issues. In an interview with L'Équipe in October 2017, he revealed that difficulties with physical recovery during the final years of his career had been linked to myocarditis caused by a viral infection, a condition that had affected him since his time at Sunderland and contributed to his retirement from professional football.

== International career ==
Cana was initially named in the Albania national team squad for an unofficial friendly against his native Kosovo, part of the Brotherly derby, where he came on as an 80th-minute substitute for Besnik Hasi. He was granted Albanian citizenship on 6 March 2003, becoming eligible to represent Albania alongside Switzerland and France, whose citizenship he also held, before choosing to represent Albania. Initially, he was intended to play for the Albania under-21 team, but instead joined the senior national team. He made his competitive debut for Albania seniors on 11 June 2003 at the age of 19, coming on as a substitute in a 3–2 away defeat to Switzerland in a UEFA Euro 2004 qualifying match.

During the 2006 FIFA World Cup qualification, Cana established himself as a regular starter at centre-back under Hans-Peter Briegel, missing only one qualifier through suspension after accumulating yellow cards. He began the campaign with a 2–1 home victory over reigning European champions Greece on 4 September 2004, after which an Albanian immigrant supporter celebrating the victory was attacked and killed by local hooligans in Greece. Albania subsequently faced stronger opposition in Ukraine, Denmark and Turkey, suffering five 2–0 defeats, while also recording two victories over Kazakhstan, one over Georgia and a draw against Ukraine. The team finished third from bottom in the group with 13 points, its highest total and best placing in a World Cup qualifying campaign up to that time. He scored his first international goal on 17 August 2005, netting in a 2–1 victory over Azerbaijan at Qemal Stafa Stadium on his 16th international appearance.

Cana remained a regular during the UEFA Euro 2008 qualifying campaign. During the latter half of the campaign in 2007, he was part of an Albania side that recorded four consecutive clean sheets for the first time in its history, including goalless draws in March and victories over Luxembourg in June. On 12 September 2007, Cana was sent off for the first time in a 1–0 home defeat to the Netherlands following an altercation with Wesley Sneijder and Ruud van Nistelrooy, resulting in a two-match suspension. He returned for the penultimate match of the campaign on 17 November against Belarus, providing an assist for Erjon Bogdani in a 4–2 home defeat.

Cana continued to be one of Albania's most consistent performers across its European Championship and World Cup qualifying campaigns, completing eight full matches in each campaign and nine in one, despite serving suspensions for accumulated yellow cards.

From November 2009 to October 2010, Cana was an almost ever-present member of the Albania side that set a national record by going eight consecutive matches unbeaten, including a run of five successive clean sheets across friendlies and the opening matches of the UEFA Euro 2012 qualifying campaign. Cana first captained Albania on 25 May 2010 in a 1–0 friendly victory over Montenegro. He earned his 50th cap on 7 June 2011 in a 2–0 defeat to Bosnia and Herzegovina during the Euro 2012 qualifying campaign. Following the international retirements of Altin Lala and Ervin Skela at the end of the qualifying campaign, Cana was appointed Albania's permanent captain.

In the UEFA Euro 2016 qualifying campaign, Cana started all eight of Albania's matches and played every available minute, serving as captain and providing leadership and defensive experience as the team qualified for its first major international tournament. The campaign began with a historic 1–0 away victory over Portugal on 7 September 2014, Albania's first win against the Portuguese in six meetings, followed by a 1–1 home draw against Denmark on 11 October, in which Albania conceded a late equaliser after taking the lead. Three days later, Albania's third qualifying match against Serbia was abandoned before half-time following incidents involving players and Serbian supporters who invaded the pitch. During the disturbance, Cana intervened after a Serbian supporter struck Bekim Balaj on the shoulder with a chair; the supporter then brought Cana to the ground while attempting to tackle Balaj. Cana later stated that the supporter had bitten his finger during the incident. UEFA initially awarded Serbia a 3–0 forfeit victory and deducted three points from the hosts. On 10 July 2015, the Court of Arbitration for Sport overturned the result, awarding Albania a 3–0 forfeit victory while upholding Serbia's points deduction. The ruling moved Albania to second place in Group I with 10 points, level with Denmark and two behind leaders Portugal. Earlier in March, Albania had recorded a 2–1 victory over Armenia, but then endured a three-match run without scoring during the autumn phase of the campaign, managing only a valuable goalless away draw against Denmark before securing a 3–0 victory over Armenia on the final matchday to finish second in the group and qualify directly for the UEFA Euro 2016 finals.

On 31 May 2016, Cana was named in Albania's final 23-man squad for the Euro 2016 finals. He made his major tournament debut in Albania's opening Group A match against Switzerland, receiving an early booking for a foul on Blerim Džemaili before becoming the first player to be sent off at the tournament after handling the ball outside the penalty area shortly before half-time. Suspended for the following group match, he returned as an 83rd-minute substitute in Albania's historic 1–0 victory over Romania, the country's first win at a major international tournament. Albania finished third in the group with three points and a goal difference of −2, but was eliminated after being ranked the lowest among the four third-placed teams.

Cana announced his retirement from international football on 23 June 2016. With 94 appearances, he became Albania's all-time most-capped player, a record he held until October 2025, when he was surpassed by Elseid Hysaj. He also shares the national record for FIFA World Cup qualification appearances with Ervin Skela (28), while holding the records for the most appearances across UEFA European Championship qualifying and final tournaments combined (29), the most appearances as captain (41), and the highest disciplinary tally with 26 yellow cards and two red cards.

== Post-football ==
Following Albania's historic participation at UEFA Euro 2016, Cana was among the members of the national team who were issued diplomatic passports by the Albanian government in recognition of their achievement.

On 26 October 2017, Cana was appointed by the Albanian Football Association as the grassroots ambassador for football development in Albania.

== Personal life ==
Born in Pristina, Cana has paternal roots in Gjakova and has two sisters, Lea and Laure. He is also a cousin of siblings Genta Cana, a former sports presenter at Klan Kosova, and Granit Cana, a former footballer who played in the First Football League of Kosovo and the Albanian Kategoria Superiore with Teuta. Granit Cana later appeared in Big Brother VIP Albania season 1. From an early age, Cana regularly attended FC Prishtina matches and described himself as an avid supporter of the club. In an interview, Cana stated that archeology is one of his biggest interests and that he planned to work in the Albanology field after his football career, having studied history at university.

He has served as an ambassador for the United Nations Development Programme's anti-poverty initiatives, starting from December 2006. In November 2008, Cana was awarded the title of Ambassador of the Nation (Ambasador i Kombit) by the President of Albania, Bamir Topi. On 9 October 2010, Cana was named UNICEF Ambassador for Children's Rights in Albania.

He married Monica Ercoli, an Italian, in June 2014, with the ceremony taking place on 27 June 2014. They have a son named Boiken and reside in Tirana, Albania. On 28 December 2011, Cana was appointed Special Ambassador of Kosovo Sports in the World by the Kosovo Olympic Committee to support the international promotion and recognition of Kosovo sport.

On 15 January 2015, Cana was named Honorary Ambassador of Kosovo. On 29 September 2018, Cana received the inaugural Albanian Sports Ambassador award, recognising his contribution to promoting the image of Albanian sport internationally; he was selected ahead of former Albania internationals Igli Tare and Edvin Murati.

== Career statistics ==
=== Club ===
Appearances and goals by club, season and competition
Club	Season	League			National cup		League cup		Europe		Other		Total	
Club	Season	Division	Apps	Goals	Apps	Goals	Apps	Goals	Apps	Goals	Apps	Goals	Apps	Goals
Paris Saint-Germain B	2000–01	CFA	4	0	—		—		—		—		4	0
Paris Saint-Germain B	2001–02	CFA	12	1	—		—		—		—		12	1
Paris Saint-Germain B	2002–03	CFA	23	1	—		—		—		—		23	1
Paris Saint-Germain B	Total		39	2	—		—		—		—		39	2
Paris Saint-Germain	2002–03	Ligue 1	3	0	—		—		—		—		3	0
Paris Saint-Germain	2003–04	Ligue 1	32	1	4	0	—		—		—		36	1
Paris Saint-Germain	2004–05	Ligue 1	32	1	1	0	1	0	6 (Note: Appearances in UEFA Champions League)	0	—		40	1
Paris Saint-Germain	2005–06	Ligue 1	2	0	—		—		—		—		2	0
Paris Saint-Germain	Total		69	2	5	0	1	0	6	0	—		81	2
Marseille	2005–06	Ligue 1	28	1	6	0	1	0	8 (Note: Appearances in UEFA Cup)	0	—		43	1
Marseille	2006–07	Ligue 1	33	2	6	0	1	0	5 (Note: Two appearances in UEFA Intertoto Cup, three appearances in UEFA Cup)	0	—		45	2
Marseille	2007–08	Ligue 1	34	2	3	1	2	0	9 (Note: Six appearances in UEFA Champions League, three appearances in UEFA Cup)	0	—		48	3
Marseille	2008–09	Ligue 1	27	1	—		—		12 (Note: Eight appearances in UEFA Champions League, four appearances in UEFA Cup)	1	—		39	2
Marseille	Total		122	6	15	1	4	0	34	1	—		175	8
Sunderland	2009–10	Premier League	31	0	2	0	2	0	—		—		35	0
Galatasaray	2010–11	Süper Lig	24	1	4	0	—		3 (Note: Appearances in UEFA Europa League)	0	—		31	1
Lazio	2011–12	Serie A	15	2	—		—		6	0	—		21	2
Lazio	2012–13	Serie A	24	0	5	0	—		9	0	—		38	0
Lazio	2013–14	Serie A	26	2	0	0	—		6 (Note: Six appearances in UEFA Champions League, three appearances in UEFA Europa League)	0	0	0	32	2
Lazio	2014–15	Serie A	17	0	3	0	—		—		—		20	0
Lazio	Total		82	4	8	0	—		21	0	0	0	111	4
Nantes	2015–16	Ligue 1	21	0	3	0	0	0	—		—		24	0
Career total			388	15	37	1	7	0	64	1	0	0	496	17

=== International ===
Appearances and goals by national team and year
National team	Year	Apps	Goals
Albania	2002	1	0
Albania	2003	6	0
Albania	2004	5	0
Albania	2005	8	1
Albania	2006	4	0
Albania	2007	6	0
Albania	2008	6	0
Albania	2009	6	0
Albania	2010	6	0
Albania	2011	9	0
Albania	2012	8	0
Albania	2013	9	0
Albania	2014	8	0
Albania	2015	7	0
Albania	2016	5	0
Total		94	1

Scores and results list Albania's goal tally first, score column indicates score after each Cana goal.

List of international goals scored by Lorik Cana
No.	Date	Venue	Cap	Opponent	Score	Result	Competition
1	17 August 2005	Qemal Stafa Stadium, Tirana, Albania	16	Azerbaijan	2–1	2–1	Friendly

== Honours ==
Paris Saint-Germain

- Coupe de France: 2003–04; runner-up: 2002–03
- Trophée des Champions runner-up: 2004

Marseille

- Coupe de France runner-up: 2005–06, 2006–07

Lazio

- Coppa Italia: 2012–13; runner-up: 2014–15
- Supercoppa Italiana runner-up: 2013, 2015

Individual

- Albanian Footballer of the Year: 2003
- Albanian Fan's Footballer of the Year: 2009
- Albanian Sports Ambassador: 2018

== Notes ==
Sporting positions
Preceded by Habib Beye	Marseille captain 2007–2009	Succeeded by Mamadou Niang
Preceded by Dean Whitehead	Sunderland captain 2009–2010	Succeeded by Lee Cattermole
Preceded by Altin Lala	Albania captain 2011–2016	Succeeded by Ansi Agolli
