= 2008–09 RC Lens season =

RC Lens
2008–09 season
- President: Gervais Martel
- Head coach: Jean-Guy Wallemme
- Stadium: Stade Bollaert-Delelis
- Ligue 2: 1st (promoted)
- Coupe de France: Seventh round
- Coupe de la Ligue: Quarter-finals
- Top goalscorer: League: Toifilou Maoulida (13); All: Toifilou Maoulida (13)
- Average home league attendance: 29,842
- Biggest win: Lorient 0–3 Lens; Lens 3–0 Angers; Lens 4–1 Strasbourg
Home colours	Away colours	Third colours

The 2008–09 season was RC Lens's 103rd season in existence and the club's first season back in the second division of French football since 1990. In addition to the domestic league, Lens participated in this season's edition of the Coupe de France and the Coupe de la Ligue. The season covered the period from 1 July 2008 to 30 June 2009.

== Players ==
=== First-team squad ===
Note: Flags indicate national team as defined under FIFA eligibility rules; some limited exceptions apply. Players may hold more than one non-FIFA nationality.

No.	Pos.	Nation	Player
—	GK	FRA	Arnaud Brocard
—	GK	CRO	Vedran Runje
—	DF	MLI	Éric Chelle
—	DF	FRA	Frédéric Gaillard
—	DF	FRA	Fabien Laurenti
—	DF	POR	Marco Ramos
—	DF	FRA	William Rémy
—	DF	FRA	Grégory Vignal
—	DF	TUN	Alaeddine Yahia
—	MF	FRA	Yohan Demont

No.	Pos.	Nation	Player
—	MF	MAR	Mounir Diane
—	MF	FRA	Geoffrey Doumeng
—	MF	MAR	Adil Hermach
—	MF	MLI	Sidi Yaya Keita
—	MF	SRB	Nenad Kovačević
—	FW	TOG	Razak Boukari
—	FW	CIV	Aruna Dindane
—	FW	TUN	Issam Jemâa
—	FW	FRA	Toifilou Maoulida
—	FW	FRA	Kévin Monnet-Paquet

== Pre-season and friendlies ==
Win Draw Loss Fixtures

2 July 2008 Friendly	Lens	2–2	UNFP	Vichy
19:00 CEST (UTC+2)	Roux 7'; Demont 64'		Decamps 16'; Allegro 40'	Stadium: Terrain du centre Omnisports

5 July 2008 Friendly	Amiens	1–2	Lens	Amiens
19:00 CEST (UTC+2)	Contout 16'		Boukari 15'; Seïd Khiter 74'	Stadium: Stade Jean Bouin; Attendance: 1,500; Referee: Buquet

12 July 2008 Friendly	Lens	1–2	Mons	Arras
19:00 CEST (UTC+2)				Stadium: Stade Degouve; Attendance: 1,500

15 July 2008 Friendly	Lens	1–0	Beauvais	Le Touquet
18:00 CEST (UTC+2)	Roudet 54'			Stadium: Stade municipal Attendance: 700; Referee: Aimar

19 July 2008 Friendly	Lens	0–0	Boulogne	Le Touquet
19:00 CEST (UTC+2)				Stadium: Stade municipal Attendance: 2,300; Referee: Mehdi Mokthari

26 July 2008 Friendly	Lens	0–0	Auxerre	Lens
20:00 CEST (UTC+2)				Stadium: Stade Bollaert-Delelis; Attendance: 14,000; Referee: Rémy

6 September 2008 Friendly	Valenciennes	0–0	Lens	Valenciennes
17:00 CEST (UTC+2)				Stadium: Stade Nungesser; Attendance: 9,320
Note: Match was played in two 40-minute halves.

23 January 2009 Friendly	Lens	1–1	Valenciennes	Avion
17:30 CET (UTC+1)	Dindane 29'		Audel 82'	Stadium: Stade François Blin d'Avion; Attendance: 400; Referee: Ludovic Zmyslony

== Competitions ==
=== Overview ===
Competition	First match	Last match	Starting round	Final position	Record							
Competition	First match	Last match	Starting round	Final position	Pld	W	D	L	GF	GA	GD	Win %
Ligue 2	1 August 2008	29 May 2009	Matchday 1	Winners	38	20	8	10	47	35	+12	52.63
Coupe de France	23 November 2008		Seventh round	Seventh round	1	0	1	0	0	0	+0	0.00
Coupe de la Ligue	24 September 2008	14 January 2009	Round of 32	Quarter-finals	3	2	0	1	4	2	+2	66.67
Total					42	22	9	11	51	37	+14	52.38

Source: Competitions

=== Ligue 2 ===
==== League table ====
Pos	Team	Pld	W	D	L	GF	GA	GD	Pts	Promotion or Relegation
1	Lens (C, P)	38	20	8	10	47	35	+12	68	Promotion to Ligue 1
2	Montpellier (P)	38	19	9	10	61	36	+25	66	Promotion to Ligue 1
3	Boulogne (P)	38	20	6	12	51	36	+15	66	Promotion to Ligue 1
4	Strasbourg	38	18	11	9	57	45	+12	65	
5	Metz	38	17	12	9	48	35	+13	63	

Source: Ligue 2
(C) Champions; (P) Promoted

==== Results summary ====
Overall								Home						Away					
Pld	W	D	L	GF	GA	GD	Pts	W	D	L	GF	GA	GD	W	D	L	GF	GA	GD
38	20	8	10	47	35	+12	68	12	2	5	25	13	+12	8	6	5	22	22	0

==== Results by round ====
Round	1	2	3	4	5	6	7	8	9	10	11	12	13	14	15	16	17	18	19	20	21	22	23	24	25	26	27	28	29	30	31	32	33	34	35	36	37	38
Ground	H	A	H	A	H	H	A	H	A	H	A	H	A	H	A	H	A	H	A	H	A	H	A	A	H	A	H	A	H	A	H	A	H	A	H	A	H	A
Result	W	L	W	W	W	L	W	W	W	W	L	W	D	L	W	L	W	W	L	W	D	W	W	W	D	D	L	D	D	D	W	W	W	D	W	L	L	L
Position	1	8	4	2	2	4	3	3	3	1	2	1	2	3	1	2	1	1	1	1	1	1	1	1	1	1	1	1	1	3	1	1	1	1	1	1	1	1

A = Away; H = Home; W = Win; D = Draw; L = Loss

==== Matches ====
The league fixtures were announced on 23 May 2008.

1 August 2008 1	Lens	3–1	Dijon	Lens
				Stadium: Stade Bollaert-Delelis

11 August 2008 2	Vannes	2–1	Lens	Vannes
				Stadium: Stade de la Rabine

15 August 2008 3	Lens	1–0	Châteauroux	Lens
				Stadium: Stade Bollaert-Delelis

25 August 2008 4	Nîmes	1–2	Lens	Nîmes

29 August 2008 5	Lens	2–1	Clermont	Lens
				Stadium: Stade Bollaert-Delelis

15 September 2008 6	Lens	0–1	Metz	Lens
				Stadium: Stade Bollaert-Delelis

21 September 2008 7	Troyes	0–1	Lens	Troyes

27 September 2008 8	Lens	3–0	Angers	Lens
				Stadium: Stade Bollaert-Delelis

3 October 2008 9	Ajaccio	1–2	Lens	Ajaccio

13 October 2008 10	Lens	1–0	Guingamp	Lens
				Stadium: Stade Bollaert-Delelis

20 October 2008 11	Tours	3–1	Lens	Tours

24 October 2008 12	Lens	2–0	Amiens	Lens
				Stadium: Stade Bollaert-Delelis

3 November 2008 13	Strasbourg	1–1	Lens	Strasbourg

14 November 2008 15	Bastia	0–1	Lens	Furiani
				Stadium: Stade Armand Cesari

1 December 2008 16	Lens	1–3	Sedan	Lens
				Stadium: Stade Bollaert-Delelis

5 December 2008 17	Reims	1–2	Lens	Reims

11 December 2008 14	Lens	0–2	Montpellier	Lens
				Stadium: Stade Bollaert-Delelis

19 December 2008 18	Lens	2–0	Brest	Lens
				Stadium: Stade Bollaert-Delelis

8 January 2009 19	Boulogne	3–1	Lens	Boulogne-sur-Mer
				Stadium: Stade de la Libération

17 January 2009 20	Lens	2–1	Vannes	Lens
				Stadium: Stade Bollaert-Delelis

30 January 2009 21	Châteauroux	0–0	Lens

6 February 2009 22	Lens	1–0	Nîmes	Lens
				Stadium: Stade Bollaert-Delelis

16 February 2009 23	Clermont	1–2	Lens

23 February 2009 24	Metz	1–2	Lens

2 March 2009 25	Lens	1–1	Troyes	Lens
				Stadium: Stade Bollaert-Delelis

9 March 2009 26	Angers	2–2	Lens

13 March 2009 27	Lens	0–1	Ajaccio	Lens
				Stadium: Stade Bollaert-Delelis

20 March 2009 28	Guingamp	0–0	Lens

30 March 2009 29	Lens	0–0	Tours	Lens
				Stadium: Stade Bollaert-Delelis

6 April 2009 30	Amiens	0–0	Lens

13 April 2009 31	Lens	4–1	Strasbourg	Lens
				Stadium: Stade Bollaert-Delelis

20 April 2009 32	Montpellier	0–1	Lens

24 April 2009 33	Lens	1–0	Bastia	Lens
				Stadium: Stade Bollaert-Delelis

4 May 2009 34	Sedan	2–2	Lens

11 May 2009 35	Lens	1–0	Reims	Lens
19:30	Dindane 3'			Stadium: Stade Bollaert-Delelis; Attendance: 35,312; Referee: Pascal Vileo

15 May 2009 36	Brest	3–1	Lens	Brest
19:30	Apanga 17'; Lorenzi 51'; Socrier 89'		Sartre 82'	Stadium: Stade Francis-Le Blé; Attendance: 8,636; Referee: Sébastien Moreira

22 May 2009 37	Lens	0–1	Boulogne	Lens
19:30			Ramaré 58'	Stadium: Stade Bollaert-Delelis; Attendance: 40,032; Referee: Said Ennjimi

29 May 2009 38	Dijon	1–0	Lens	Dijon
19:45	Lotiès 84'			Stadium: Stade Gaston Gérard; Attendance: 9,111; Referee: Éric Poulat

=== Coupe de France ===
23 November 2008 Seventh round	Arras	0–0 (a.e.t.) (4–2 p)	Lens	Lens
15:00				Stadium: Stade Bollaert-Delelis; Attendance: 9,379; Referee: Éric Wernert

=== Coupe de la Ligue ===
24 September 2008 Round of 32	Lorient	0–3	Lens	Lorient
21:00			Jemâa 60', 66'; Boukari 90+3'	Stadium: Stade du Moustoir; Attendance: 5,911; Referee: Laurent Duhamel

11 November 2008 Round of 16	Sochaux	0–1 (a.e.t.)	Lens	Montbéliard
17:00			Yahya 109'	Stadium: Stade Auguste Bonal; Attendance: 17,098; Referee: Jean-Charles Cailleux

14 January 2009 Quarter-finals	Paris Saint-Germain	2–0	Lens	Paris
20:45	Keita 14' (o.g.); Clément 90+3'			Stadium: Parc des Princes; Attendance: 32,093; Referee: Fredy Fautrel
