= Toifilou Maoulida =

French former professional footballer (born 1979)

Personal information
- Date of birth: 8 June 1979 (age 47)
- Place of birth: Dzaoudzi, Mayotte, France
- Height: 1.84 m (6 ft 0 in)
- Positions: Striker; winger

Senior career*
Years	Team	Apps	(Gls)
1997–2001	Montpellier	118	(26)
2002–2005	Rennes	68	(12)
2003–2004	→ Metz (loan)	33	(12)
2005–2006	Monaco	16	(0)
2006	→ Marseille (loan)	16	(6)
2006–2007	Marseille	34	(4)
2007	Auxerre	15	(1)
2008–2011	Lens	105	(30)
2011–2014	Bastia	68	(19)
2014–2016	Nîmes	70	(15)
2016–2017	Tours	13	(0)
Total		556	(125)
Medal record
Football
Bastia
Winner	Ligue 2	2012
- * Club domestic league appearances and goals

Toifilou Maoulida (born 8 June 1979) is a French former professional footballer who played as a striker or as a winger.

== Club career ==
Maoulida was born in Mayotte, a small island in the Indian Ocean, close to the Comoro Islands and Reunion Island, and raised in Marseille.

He started his professional career at Montpellier Hérault Sport Club in 1997. In January 2002, he was transferred to Stade Rennais F.C. After two seasons, coach László Bölöni considered that Maoulida did not fit in any longer with his tactical scheme and he was loaned to Metz, in the east of France. There, he scored 12 goals in 33 matches. After returning to Stade Rennais for the 2004–05 season he scored 7 goals in 31 matches.

In summer 2005, he was transferred to AS Monaco FC on free transfer, where he failed once more. Eventually, he went to Olympique de Marseille where he finally met success reaching the French Cup final in the 2005–06 and 2006–07 seasons and getting the second place in the French League 1 in the 2006–07 season. He played for AJ Auxerre in the 2007–08 season, and joined RC Lens in January 2008, at that time of the bottom three in Ligue 1.

In August 2011, he signed a contract with Ligue 2 side SC Bastia.

In July 2014, he signed a two-year contract with Ligue 2 team Nîmes Olympique.

== International career ==
Given that Comorians consider the Mayotte's people as their own, the country's football federation asked Maoulida to join the Comorian senior team, but he rejected the offer out of respect for the people of his island.

== Personal life ==
Maoulida's nephew Keyliane Abdallah is also a professional footballer.

== Career statistics ==
Appearances and goals by club, season and competition
Club	Season	League			Cup		Europe (Note: Includes UEFA Intertoto Cup, UEFA Cup and UEFA Champions League)		Total	
Club	Season	Division	Apps	Goals	Apps	Goals	Apps	Goals	Apps	Goals
Montpellier	1997–98	Division 1	5	1					5	1
Montpellier	1998–99	Division 1	28	2					28	5
Montpellier	1999–2000	Division 1	29	5					29	5
Montpellier	2000–01	Division 2	36	13					36	13
Montpellier	2000–01	Division 1	20	5					20	5
Montpellier	Total		118	26					118	26
Rennes	2001–02	Division 1	9	2					9	2
Rennes	2002–03	Ligue 1	27	3					27	3
Rennes	2003–04	Ligue 1	1	0					1	0
Rennes	2004–05	Ligue 1	31	7					31	7
Rennes	Total		68	12					68	12
Metz	2003–04	Ligue 1	33	12					33	12
Monaco	2005–06	Ligue 1	16	0					16	0
Marseille (loan)	2005–06	Ligue 1	16	6	6	5	—		22	11
Marseille	2006–07	Ligue 1	34	4	6	5	4	1	44	10
Auxerre	2007–08	Ligue 1	15	1	3	2	—		18	3
Lens	2007–08	Ligue 1	16	5	4	1	—		20	6
Lens	2008–09	Ligue 2	34	13	3	1	—		37	14
Lens	2009–10	Ligue 1	24	10	6	3	—		30	13
Lens	2010–11	Ligue 1	31	2	1	0	—		32	2
Lens	Total		105	30	14	5	0	0	119	35
Bastia	2011–12	Ligue 2	31	13	4	4	—		35	17
Bastia	2012–13	Ligue 1	31	6	4	2	—		35	8
Bastia	2013–14	Ligue 1	6	0	3	0	—		9	0
Bastia	Total		68	19	11	6	0	0	79	25
Nîmes	2014–15	Ligue 2	36	11	3	1	—		39	12
Nîmes	2015–16	Ligue 2	34	4	1	0	—		35	4
Nîmes	Total		70	15	4	1	0	0	74	16
Tours	2016–17	Ligue 2	13	0	0	0	—		13	0
Career total			556	125	44	24	4	1	604	150

== Honours ==
Montpellier

- UEFA Intertoto Cup: 1999
