= Mamadou Niang =

Senegalese footballer (born 1979)

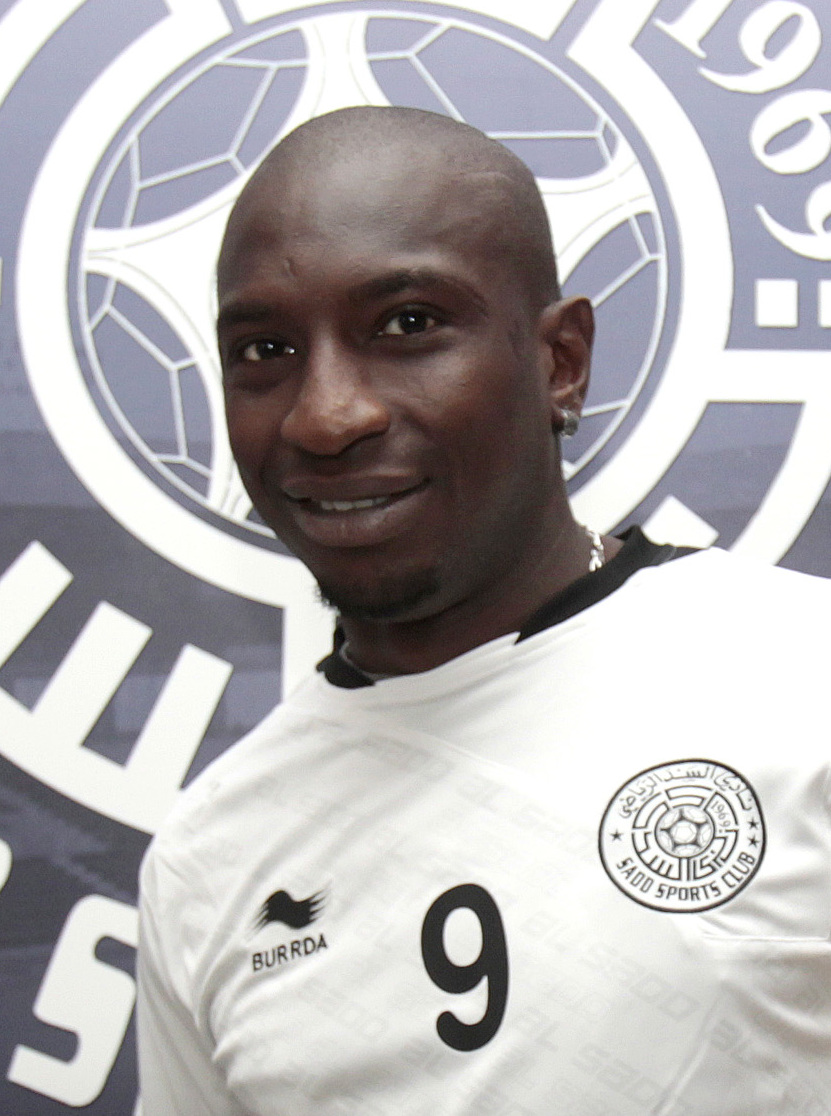
- Niang with Al-Sadd in 2011

Personal information
- Full name: Mamadou Hamidou Niang
- Date of birth: 13 October 1979 (age 47)
- Place of birth: Matam, Senegal
- Height: 1.78 m (5 ft 10 in)
- Position: Striker

Youth career
- 1998–1999: Le Havre

Senior career*
Years	Team	Apps	(Gls)
1999–2001	Troyes B	35	(21)
2001–2003	Troyes	47	(8)
2003	→ Metz (loan)	12	(5)
2003–2005	Strasbourg	56	(21)
2005–2010	Marseille	155	(71)
2010–2011	Fenerbahçe	29	(15)
2011–2014	Al Sadd	26	(9)
2013	→ Beşiktaş (loan)	10	(3)
2014–2015	Arles-Avignon	17	(2)
Total		387	(155)

International career
2002–2012	Senegal	58	(20)
- * Club domestic league appearances and goals

Mamadou Hamidou Niang (born 13 October 1979) is a Senegalese former professional footballer who played as a striker. He has represented Senegal at international level, participating in the 2004, 2006, and 2008 African Cup of Nations. He is the older brother of Papa Niang, who is also a professional footballer.

== Club career ==
=== Troyes ===
After beginning his career with the Le Havre youth team, Niang turned professional at 18 years of age with Troyes. He had a mixed beginning to his career with his first season featuring ten Ligue 1 starts, all from the bench, the following season would show little improvement with 17 starts and only 3 league goals.

=== Loan to Metz ===
A loan period with Ligue 2 club Metz allowed him to hone his skills, contributing five goals in 12 appearances and helping Metz return to top flight French football for the 2003–04 season.

=== Strasbourg ===
Jean Fernandez, the Metz manager, tried to make the loan deal into a permanent move but failed and Niang left Troyes for Strasbourg. The arrival of Danijel Ljuboja, to Strasbourg at the same time allowed Niang to form an important strike partnership until Ljuboja moved to Paris Saint-Germain. Niang didn't score again for the remainder of the second half of that season.

The 2004–05 season saw Mickaël Pagis arrive at Strasbourg, and a fruitful new partnership was formed, with the pair linking up for 27 goals in the league. This partnership helped Strasbourg make it to the Coupe de la Ligue final, where victory over Caen gave Strasbourg their second Coupe de la Ligue trophy. Niang scored Strasbourg's first goal as they won 2–1.

=== Marseille ===
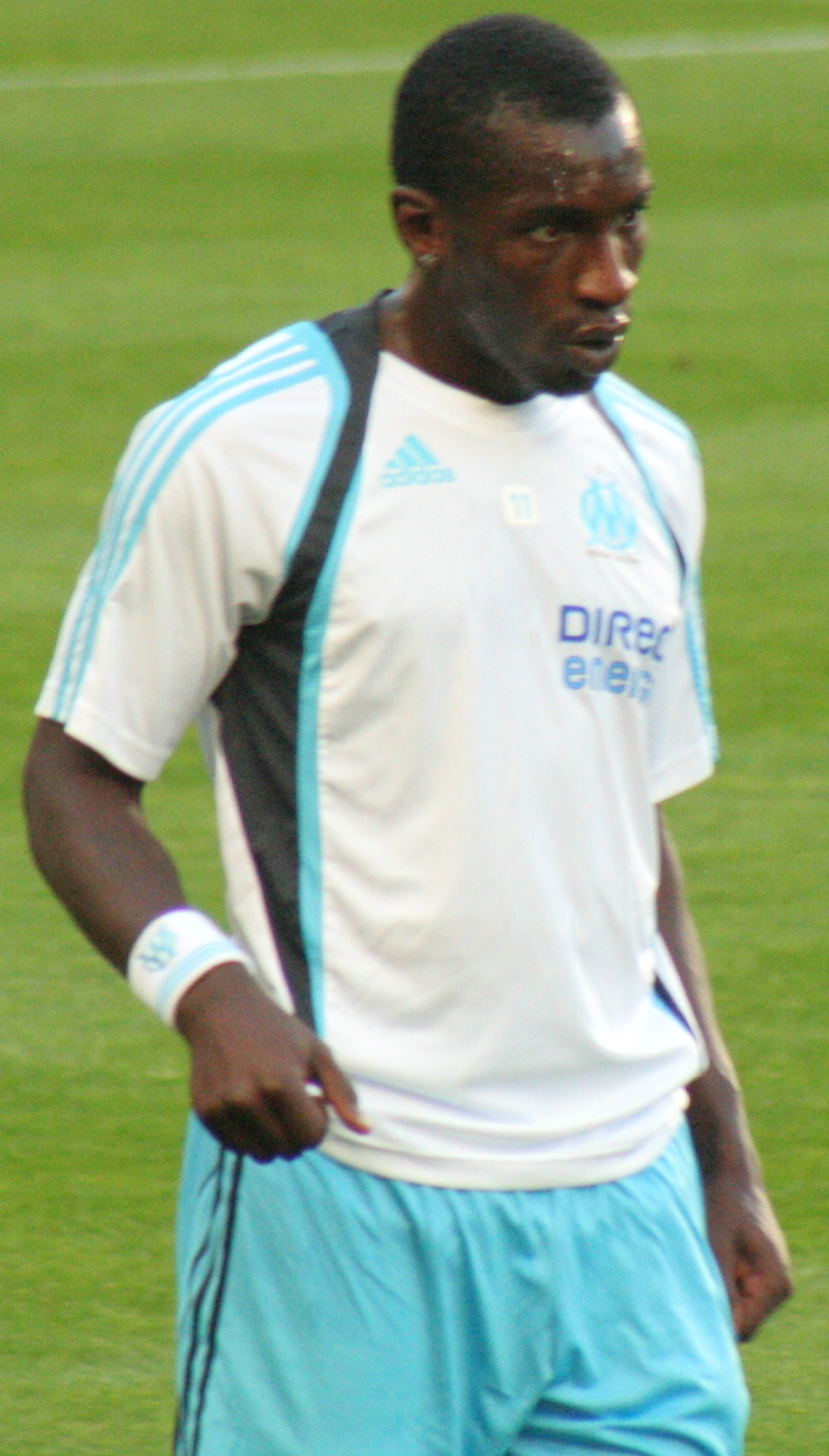
Niang warming up with Marseille in 2009

In 2005, Niang moved to Marseille for a reported fee of €7 million. He was joined six months later by Mickaël Pagis. Niang finished the season as Marseille's top scorer with ten goals but Marseille lost the Coupe de France final to Paris Saint-Germain.

Niang was selected Marseille player of the month by the fans for May 2008.

Niang would go on to finish the 2009–10 season with 18 goals in Ligue 1, making him the highest scorer in the league and Marseille's highest scorer with 28 goals in all competitions.

=== Fenerbahçe ===
Niang signed a 3+1 year deal with Fenerbahçe on 14 August 2010 for a fee of reported €8 million. He made a great start with Fenerbahçe when he scored seven goals in his first six league appearances. Niang scored his first hat-trick for Fenerbahçe on his fifth appearance when they won 6–2 against Kasımpaşa. He helped his side win the 2010–11 Süper Lig, scoring 16 goals in 29 appearances.

=== Al Sadd ===
On 6 September 2011, Niang was sold to Al-Sadd for €7.5 million.

On 19 October 2011, at the 2011 AFC Champions League semi-final match against Suwon Samsung Bluewings, he scored the controversial, un-sportsmanlike second goal for his team. Al Sadd should've sent the ball back to the Bluewings since the play was suspended when the home team's player was injured. However, while Suwon's defense stood still thinking their goalkeeper will get the ball back, Niang stole the ball and went past the goalkeeper to score. The goal induced an intrusion of a home fan and a huge melee of both players and bench. The controversy got bigger when Al Sadd's player Keita took a swing at a home fan. Even though his goal was against general notion of fair-play, Niang argued that there was no problem with his goal, and that it was Suwon who played without manners, inducing melee between two teams. After all, AFC did not conclude this issue justly, by giving disciplinary actions to Suwon only, Al Sadd getting absolutely nothing, not even Niang or Keita. He then got himself sent-off in injury time for kicking the ball away when he was flagged offside, receiving another yellow card in addition to his previous, meaning he could not participate in the second leg in Doha.

==== Beşiktaş (loan) ====
On 31 January 2013, Niang moved to Turkish side Beşiktaş on loan until the end of the season.

On 3 March 2013, he scored his first goal and contributed with an assist in a 3–2 win against his old club Fenerbahçe securing three points for his team in the final derby ever on İnönü Stadium.

=== Arles-Avignon ===
On 28 August 2014, Niang returned to France to sign for Arles-Avignon, having been overseas for the last four years.

== International career ==
Niang represented the national team at the 2006 Africa Cup of Nations, where his team took fourth place for the third time in history.

== Career statistics ==
=== Club ===
Appearances and goals by club, season and competition
Club	Season	League			National cup (Note: Includes Coupe de France, Turkish Cup, Emir of Qatar Cup)		League cup (Note: Includes Coupe de la Ligue, Qatar Cup)		Continental		Other		Total	
Club	Season	Division	Apps	Goals	Apps	Goals	Apps	Goals	Apps	Goals	Apps	Goals	Apps	Goals
Troyes	2000–01	Division 1	10	2	3	1	1	0	—		—		14	3
Troyes	2001–02	Division 1	17	3	1	0	1	0	2 (Note: Appearances in UEFA Cup)	0	—		21	3
Troyes	2002–03	Ligue 1	20	3	0	0	1	0	—		—		21	3
Troyes	Total		47	8	4	1	3	0	2	0	—		56	9
Metz (loan)	2002–03	Ligue 2	12	5	1	0	2	1	—		—		15	6
Strasbourg	2003–04	Ligue 1	23	9	1	1	1	0	—		—		25	10
Strasbourg	2004–05	Ligue 1	33	12	0	0	5	3	—		—		38	15
Strasbourg	Total		56	21	1	1	6	3	—		—		63	25
Marseille	2005–06	Ligue 1	28	10	4	2	0	0	8	1	—		40	13
Marseille	2006–07	Ligue 1	37	12	6	3	2	0	4	2	—		49	17
Marseille	2007–08	Ligue 1	29	18	1	0	1	1	10 (Note: Six appearances and two goals in UEFA Champions League, four appearances and two goals in UEFA Cup)	4	—		41	23
Marseille	2008–09	Ligue 1	27	13	0	0	1	0	13 (Note: Seven appearances and four goals in UEFA Champions League, six appearances and two goals in UEFA Cup)	7	—		41	20
Marseille	2009–10	Ligue 1	32	18	1	0	4	1	9 (Note: Six appearances and one goal in UEFA Champions League, three appearances and two goals in UEFA Europa League)	3	—		46	22
Marseille	2010–11	Ligue 1	2	0	—		—		—		0	0	2	0
Marseille	Total		155	71	12	5	8	2	44	17	0	0	219	95
Fenerbahçe	2010–11	Süper Lig	29	15	2	0	—		2 (Note: Appearances in UEFA Europa League)	0	—		33	15
Al Sadd	2011–12	Qatar Stars League	13	4	3	1	2	3	4 (Note: Appearances in AFC Champions League)	3	3 (Note: Appearances in FIFA Club World Cup)	0	25	11
Al Sadd	2012–13	Qatar Stars League	9	4	0	0	0	0	—		—		9	4
Al Sadd	2013–14	Qatar Stars League	4	1	—		—		—		—		4	1
Al Sadd	Total		26	9	3	1	2	3	4	3	3	0	38	16
Beşiktaş (loan)	2012–13	Süper Lig	10	3	—		—		—		—		10	3
Arles-Avignon	2014–15	Ligue 2	16	2	1	0	1	1	—		—		18	3
Arles-Avignon	2015–16	CFA	1	0	—		—		—		—		1	0
Arles-Avignon	Total		17	2	1	0	1	1	—		—		19	3
Career total			352	134	24	8	22	10	52	20	3	0	453	172

=== International ===
Appearances and goals by national team and year
National team	Year	Apps	Goals
Senegal	2002	3	2
Senegal	2003	8	0
Senegal	2004	9	3
Senegal	2005	6	1
Senegal	2006	7	3
Senegal	2007	4	4
Senegal	2008	5	0
Senegal	2009	1	1
Senegal	2010	6	6
Senegal	2011	4	0
Senegal	2012	5	0
Total		58	20

Scores and results list Senegal's goal tally first, score column indicates score after each Niang goal.

List of international goals scored by Mamadou Niang
No.	Date	Venue	Opponent	Score	Result	Competition
1	27 March 2002	Stade Leopold Senghor, Dakar, Senegal	Bolivia	2–1	2–1	Friendly
2	19 November 2002	First National Bank Stadium, Johannesburg, South Africa	South Africa	1–1	1–1	Nelson Mandela Challenge
3	30 January 2004	Stade 15 Octobre, Bizerte, Tunisia	Kenya	1–0	3–0	2004 Africa Cup of Nations
4	30 January 2004	Stade 15 Octobre, Bizerte, Tunisia	Kenya	3–0	3–0	2004 Africa Cup of Nations
5	17 November 2004	Stade Bon Rencontre, Toulon, France	Algeria	1–0	2–1	Friendly
6	18 June 2005	Stade Leopold Senghor, Dakar, Senegal	Togo	1–1	2–2	2006 World Cup qualifiers
7	4 February 2006	Harras El-Hedoud Stadium, Alexandria, Egypt	Guinea	2–1	3–2	2006 Africa Cup of Nations
8	7 February 2006	Cairo International Stadium, Cairo, Egypt	Egypt	1–1	1–2	2006 Africa Cup of Nations
9	16 August 2006	Stade de la Vallée du Cher, Tours, France	Ivory Coast	1–0	1–0	Friendly
10	24 March 2007	Stade Leopold Senghor, Dakar, Senegal	Tanzania	1–0	4–0	2008 Africa Cup of Nations qualifiers
11	24 March 2007	Stade Leopold Senghor, Dakar, Senegal	Tanzania	3–0	4–0	2008 Africa Cup of Nations qualifiers
12	24 March 2007	Stade Leopold Senghor, Dakar, Senegal	Tanzania	4–0	4–0	2008 Africa Cup of Nations qualifiers
13	14 October 2007	Stade Robert Diochon, Rouen, France	Guinea	2–0	3–1	Friendly
14	5 September 2009	Estádio Algarve, Portugal, Portugal	Angola	1–0	1–1	Friendly
15	3 March 2010	Panthessaliko Stadium, Volos, Greece	Greece	1–0	2–0	Friendly
16	5 September 2010	Stade Frederic Kibassa Maliba, Lubumbashi, DR Congo	DR Congo	2–0	4–2	2012 Africa Cup of Nations qualifiers
17	5 September 2010	Stade Frederic Kibassa Maliba, Lubumbashi, DR Congo	DR Congo	3–0	4–2	2012 Africa Cup of Nations qualifiers
18	5 September 2010	Stade Frederic Kibassa Maliba, Lubumbashi, DR Congo	DR Congo	4–1	4–2	2012 Africa Cup of Nations qualifiers
19	9 October 2010	Stade Leopold Senghor, Dakar, Senegal	Mauritius	2–0	7–0	2012 Africa Cup of Nations qualifiers
20	9 October 2010	Stade Leopold Senghor, Dakar, Senegal	Mauritius	5–0	7–0	2012 Africa Cup of Nations qualifiers

== Honours ==
Troyes

- UEFA Intertoto Cup: 2001

Strasbourg

- Coupe de la Ligue: 2004–05

Marseille

- Ligue 1: 2009–10
- Coupe de la Ligue: 2009–10
- Trophée des Champions: 2010
- UEFA Intertoto Cup: 2005

Fenerbahçe

- Süper Lig: 2010–11

Al Sadd

- AFC Champions League: 2011

Senegal

- Africa Cup of Nations fourth place: 2006

Individual

- UNFP Ligue 1 Player of the Month: May 2005, December 2005, December 2007
- UNFP Ligue 1 Team of the Year: 2007–08, 2009–10
- UNFP Ligue 1 Goal of the Year: 2009–10
- Ligue 1 top scorer: 2009–10
- Marseille Player of the Season: 2009–10
