= 2007–08 RC Lens season =

RC Lens
2007–08 season
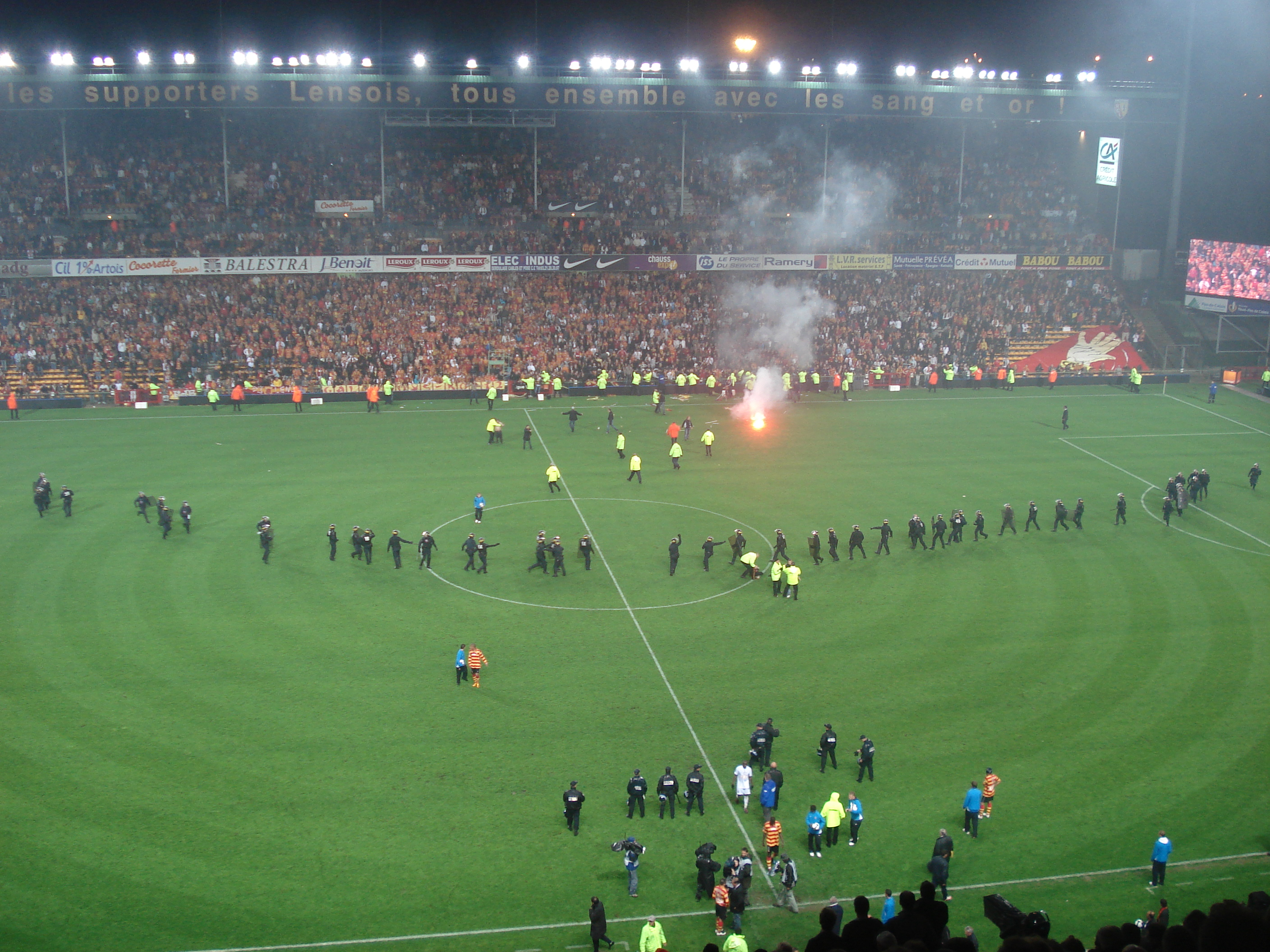
- The last game of the season that saw Lens drop.
- President: Gervais Martel
- Head coach: Guy Roux (until August); Jean-Pierre Papin (from August)
- Stadium: Stade Bollaert-Delelis
- Ligue 1: 18th (relegated)
- Coupe de France: Round of 64
- Coupe de la Ligue: Runners-up
- UEFA Cup: First round
- Top goalscorer: League: Olivier Monterrubio (9); All: Aruna Dindane (12)
Home colours	Away colours	Third colours

The 2007–08 season was the 102nd in the history of RC Lens and their 17th consecutive season in the top flight. The club participated in Ligue 1, the Coupe de France, the Coupe de la Ligue and the UEFA Cup.

== Transfers ==
=== In ===
No.	Pos	Player	Transferred from	Fee	Date	Source
	MF	(Ivory Coast) Kanga Akalé	Auxerre	£5m	12 June 2007	
	GK	(Croatia) Vedran Runje	(Turkey) Beşiktaş	£1m	20 June 2007	
	DF	(Republic of the Congo) Lucien Aubey	Toulouse	£2m	5 July 2007	
	MF	(Ivory Coast) Bonaventure Kalou	Paris Saint-Germain	£1.5m	25 July 2007	
	DF	(Senegal) Kader Mangane	(Switzerland) Young Boys	£3.3m	27 August 2007	
	MF	(France) Toifilou Maoulida	Auxerre	£3.5m	1 January 2008	
	DF	(Algeria) Nadir Belhadj	Lyon	£3.5m	6 January 2008	

=== Out ===
No.	Pos	Player	Transferred from	Fee	Date	Source
	DF	(France) Damien Tixier	(Portugal) União de Leiria	Loan return	20 June 2007	
	FW	(Tunisia) Issam Jemâa	Caen	Loan	26 June 2007	
	FW	(France) Seïd Khiter	Auxerre	Free	31 January 2008	

== Pre-season and friendlies ==
Win Draw Loss

6 July 2007 Friendly	Lens	0–0	Sint-Truiden	Avion
20:45 CEST (UTC+2)				Stadium: Stade François Blin d'Avion; Attendance: 4,000

11 July 2007 Friendly	Basel	1–2	Lens	Rothrist
19:45 CEST (UTC+2)				Stadium: Sportplatz Stampfi à Rothrist; Attendance: 2,000; Referee: M. Petignat

12 July 2007 Friendly	Neuchâtel Xamax	0–1	Lens	Saxon
19:30 CEST (UTC+2)			Lacourt 75'	Stadium: Stade de Saxon; Attendance: 600; Referee: M. Graf

14 July 2007 Friendly	Sion	2–2	Lens	Martigny
19:30 CEST (UTC+2)				Stadium: à Martigny; Attendance: 2,000

7 September 2007 Friendly	Lens	3–0	Roeselare	Le Touquet
19:00 CEST (UTC+2)				Attendance: 800; Referee: M. Wadoux

16 November 2007 Friendly	Amiens	2–0	Lens	Amiens
18:00 CET (UTC+1)				Stadium: Stade de la Licorne

1 February 2008 Friendly	Guingamp	5–3	Lens	Guingamp
20:00 CET (UTC+1)				Stadium: Stade du Roudourou; Attendance: 10,000; Referee: M. Varela

== Competitions ==
=== Overall record ===
Competition	First match	Last match	Starting round	Final position	Record							
Competition	First match	Last match	Starting round	Final position	Pld	W	D	L	GF	GA	GD	Win %
Ligue 1	4 August 2007	17 May 2008	Matchday 1	18th	38	9	13	16	43	52	−9	23.68
Coupe de France	4 January 2008		Round of 64	Round of 64	1	0	0	1	0	1	−1	0.00
Coupe de la Ligue	26 September 2007	29 March 2008	Round of 32	Runners-up	5	4	0	1	12	7	+5	80.00
UEFA Cup	16 August 2007	4 October 2007	Second qualifying round	First round	4	1	2	1	9	5	+4	25.00
Total					48	14	15	19	64	65	−1	29.17

Source: Competitions

=== Ligue 1 ===
==== League table ====
Pos	Team	Pld	W	D	L	GF	GA	GD	Pts	Qualification or relegation
16	Paris Saint-Germain	38	10	13	15	37	45	−8	43	Qualification to UEFA Cup first round (Note: Paris Saint-Germain was qualified for the 2008–09 UEFA Cup as winners of the 2007–08 Coupe de la Ligue.)
17	Toulouse	38	9	15	14	36	42	−6	42	
18	Lens (R)	38	9	13	16	43	52	−9	40	Relegation to Ligue 2
19	Strasbourg (R)	38	9	8	21	34	55	−21	35	Relegation to Ligue 2
20	Metz (R)	38	5	9	24	28	64	−36	24 (Note: Metz were deducted one point by the Discipline Commission and ordered to play one match behind closed doors as a result of the racist insults inflicted by one of their fans on Valenciennes player Abdeslam Ouaddou. However, the decision of the point deduction was reversed on 27 March 2008.)	Relegation to Ligue 2

Source: Ligue 1
Rules for classification: 1) points; 2) goal difference; 3) number of goals scored.
(R) Relegated

==== Results summary ====
Overall								Home						Away					
Pld	W	D	L	GF	GA	GD	Pts	W	D	L	GF	GA	GD	W	D	L	GF	GA	GD
38	9	13	16	43	52	−9	40	5	11	3	26	22	+4	4	2	13	17	30	−13

Source: Ligue 1

==== Results by round ====
Round	1	2	3	4	5	6	7	8	9	10	11	12	13	14	15	16	17	18	19	20	21	22	23	24	25	26	27	28	29	30	31	32	33	34	35	36	37	38
Ground	A	H	A	H	A	H	A	H	A	H	A	H	H	A	H	A	H	A	H	A	H	A	H	A	H	A	H	A	H	A	A	H	A	H	A	H	A	H
Result	L	D	L	D	L	D	L	W	D	W	L	L	W	W	D	W	L	L	L	L	W	W	D	W	D	L	D	D	D	L	L	D	L	W	L	D	L	D
Position	15	15	18	18	18	18	19	17	18	15	18	19	17	15	17	11	15	16	18	18	18	16	16	13	15	17	16	16	16	17	18	16	17	17	17	17	18	18

Source: Ligue 1
A = Away; H = Home; W = Win; D = Draw; L = Loss

==== Matches ====
The league fixtures were announced in June 2007.

4 August 2007 1	Bordeaux	1–0	Lens	Bordeaux
20:00 CEST (UTC+2)				Stadium: Stade Chaban-Delmas

12 August 2007 2	Lens	0–0	Paris Saint-Germain	Lens
21:00 CEST (UTC+2)				Stadium: Stade Félix Bollaert

29 September 2007 3	Lyon	3–0	Lens	Lyon
18:00 CEST (UTC+2)				Stadium: Stade de Gerland
Note: Match not played on 15 August, 20:30 because of the 2nd preliminary round leg of UEFA Cup for RC Lens on 16 August.

19 August 2007 4	Lens	0–0	Valenciennes	Lens
19:00 CEST (UTC+2)				Stadium: Stade Félix Bollaert

25 August 2007 5	Strasbourg	2–1	Lens	Strasbourg
20:00 CEST (UTC+2)				Stadium: Stade de la Meinau

28 November 2007 6	Lens	1–1	Caen	Lens
19:00 CEST (UTC+2)				Stadium: Stade Félix Bollaert
Note: Match not played on 29 August, 20:30 because of the 2nd preliminary round UEFA Cup return leg for RC Lens on 30 August.

2 September 2007 7	Nice	1–0	Lens	Nice
20:40 CEST (UTC+2)	Koné 52'		Dindane (penalty missed) 82'	Stadium: Stade de Ray; Referee: Hervé Piccirillo

15 September 2007 8	Lens	1–0	Nancy	Lens
20:00 CEST (UTC+2)	Dindane 70' (pen.)			Stadium: Stade Félix Bollaert; Attendance: 32,774; Referee: Bruno Coué

22 September 2007 9	Toulouse	1–1	Lens	Toulouse
20:00 CEST (UTC+2)	Bergougnoux 23'		Monterrubio 30'	Stadium: Stadium de Toulouse; Attendance: 15,034; Referee: Damien Ledentu]

6 October 2007 10	Lens	2–0	Auxerre	Lens
19:00 CEST (UTC+2)				Stadium: Stade Félix Bollaert

21 October 2007 11	Marseille	1–0	Lens	Marseille
21:00 CEST (UTC+2)	Zenden 74'			Stadium: Stade Vélodrome; Attendance: 49,245; Referee: Stéphane Bré

28 October 2007 12	Lens	1–2	Rennes	Lens
18:00 CEST (UTC+2)				Stadium: Stade Félix Bollaert

=== Coupe de France ===
4 January 2008 Round of 64	Lens	0–1	Niort	Lens
20:30 CEST (UTC+2)				Stadium: Stade Félix Bollaert

=== Coupe de la Ligue ===
26 September 2007 Round of 16	Lens	1–0	Lille	Amiens
17:00 CEST (UTC+2)	Pieroni 7'			Stadium: Stade de la Licorne; Attendance: 6,747; Referee: Bertrand Layec
Note: Match not played at Stade Félix Bollaert in Lens due to the Rugby World Cup.

31 October 2007 Round of 16	Monaco	1–2	Lens	Monaco
17:00 CEST (UTC+2)				Stadium: Stade Louis II

16 January 2008 Quarter-finals	Lens	3–0	Nancy	Lens
19:00 CEST (UTC+2)				Stadium: Stade Félix Bollaert

27 February 2008 Semi-finals	Le Mans	4–5 (a.e.t.)	Lens	Le Mans
21:00 CEST (UTC+2)				Stadium: Stade Léon Bollée

29 March 2008 Final	Lens	1–2	Paris Saint-Germain	Saint-Denis
21:00 CEST (UTC+2)				Stadium: Stade de France

=== UEFA Cup ===
==== Second qualifying round ====
The draw was held on 3 August 2007.

==== First round ====
The draw was held on 31 August 2007.
