= Frédéric Gaillard =

French footballer (born 1989)

Personal information
- Full name: Frédéric Gaillard
- Date of birth: 20 January 1989 (age 37)
- Place of birth: La Bassée, France
- Height: 1.87 m (6 ft 2 in)
- Position: Centre back

Team information
- Current team: Calais RUFC
- Number: 5

Youth career
- 1996–2004: RC Lens

Senior career*
Years	Team	Apps	(Gls)
2004–2008	Lens B	50	(3)
2008–2009	Lens	2	(0)
2009–2011	Calais	53	(5)
2011–	Avion	11	(0)
- * Club domestic league appearances and goals

Frédéric Gaillard (born 20 January 1989) is a French footballer. He currently plays for Calais RUFC.

== Football career ==
Gaillard began his career with Lens in 1996 joining the club's youth academy. Despite being awarded the Éric Sikora Trophy as Lens's best youth player of the 2007–08 season, there were rumors of player unrest. He was quickly linked with a move to English giants Liverpool, but Frédéric quickly denounce the rumor declaring that it was his dream to play at the Stade Félix Bollaert, Lens's home pitch. He finally made his professional debut during the 2008–09 season coming on as a substitute in a league match against Angers in the 81st minute. The match ended in a 2–2 draw with both goals being scored while Frédéric was on the field. Due to injuries to centre backs Eric Chelle, Romain Sartre, and Alaeddine Yahia, he made his first career start the following week playing the full 90 minutes in a 0–1 loss to AC Ajaccio. A rarity for a youth player, Frédéric took full responsibility for the loss as it was his gaffe that resulted in Ajaccio's goal.

After eleven years with RC Lens left in 2009 and, in June, joined LB Châteauroux for a trial, but he was not signed. On 30 July 2009 signed a two-year contract with Calais RUFC.
