= Habib Bamogo =

Association football player (born 1982)

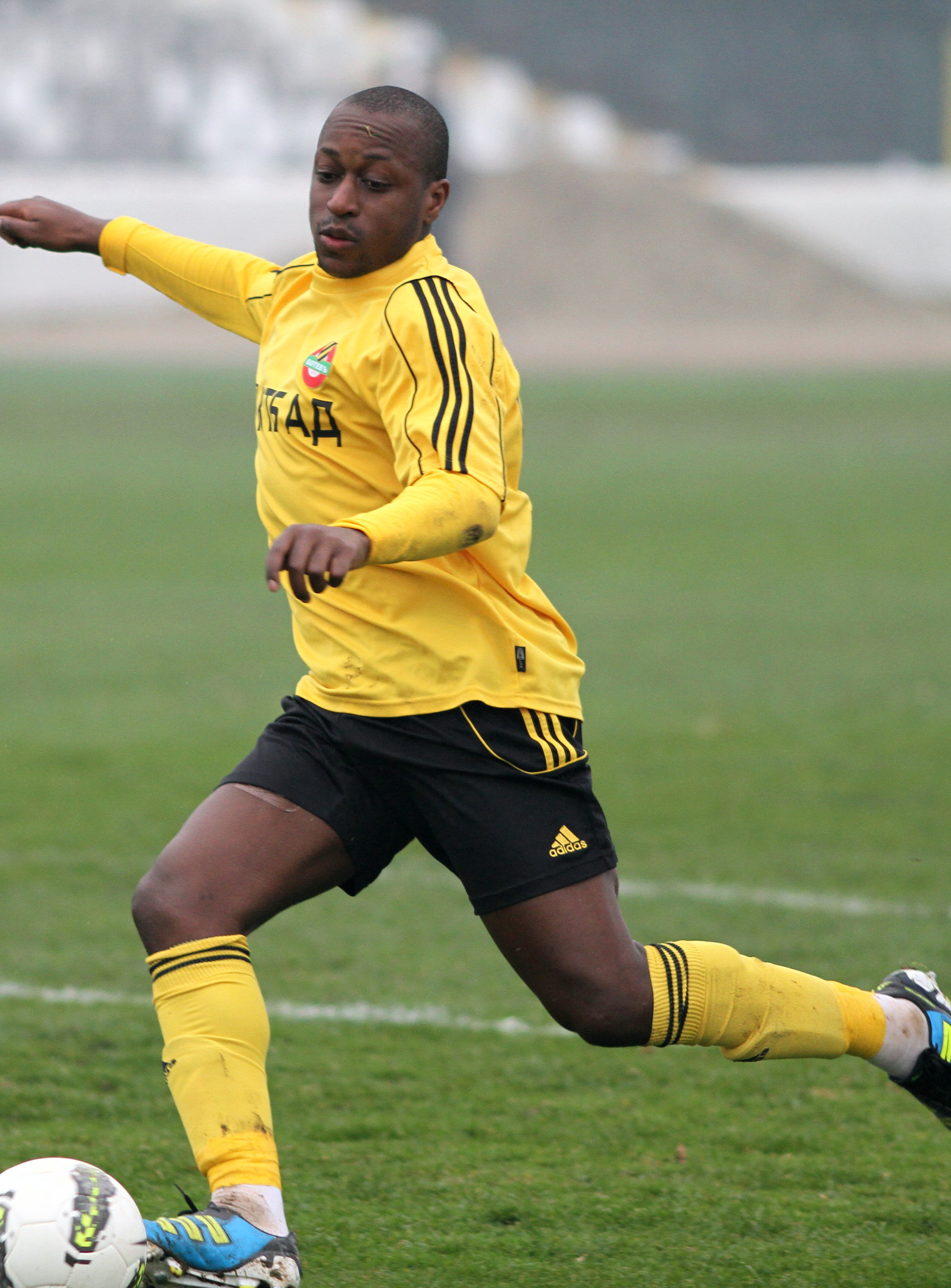

Personal information
- Full name: Nomwaya Habib Bamogo
- Date of birth: 8 May 1982 (age 44)
- Place of birth: Paris, France
- Height: 1.76 m (5 ft 9 in)
- Position: Deep-lying striker

Youth career
- 1988-1993: SSV Châtenay-Malabry
- 1993-1995: Montrouge FC 92
- 1995-1998: INF Clairefontaine
- 1999-2001: Montpellier

Senior career*
Years	Team	Apps	(Gls)
2001–2004	Montpellier	91	(22)
2004–2007	Marseille	45	(8)
2005–2006	→ Nantes (loan)	31	(4)
2006–2007	→ Celta Vigo (loan)	15	(2)
2007–2011	Nice	93	(10)
2011–2012	Panetolikos	4	(0)
2012–2013	Doncaster Rovers	4	(0)
2013–2014	Botev Plovdiv	5	(0)
2014–2015	Persiram Raja Ampat	7	(1)
Total		295	(47)

International career
2003-2004	France U21	14	(5)
2009–2010	Burkina Faso	6	(1)
- * Club domestic league appearances and goals

Nomwaya Habib Bamogo (born 8 May 1982) is a former professional footballer who played as a deep-lying striker. Born in France, he represented Burkina Faso at international level.

== Club career ==
=== Early career ===
Born in Paris, Bamogo began playing football with a youth side in Châtenay-Malabry at the age of 6, later joining a club in Montrouge when he was 11, and then INF Clairefontaine, where he played alongside Lionel Mathis, Steven Pelé and Selim Benachour. At the end of his studies, he joined the youth ranks at Ligue 1 side Montpellier.

=== Montpellier ===
Having played in their youth ranks and reserve team, Bamogo was added into Montpellier's first time squad in the 2001–02 season. He made his professional debut on 11 August 2001, coming off the bench for Francis Llacer against FC Metz, and scored his first professional goal against Lyon on 28 November, finishing the season with 23 total appearances and 2 goals.

The following season, Bamogo was called up to the France U21 team for the first time, and saw more game time, ending the season with 35 total appearances and 4 goals, leading to a 2003-04 Ligue 1 season in which he netted 16 times, which was enough for him to finish joint sixth in the league's top goalscorers rankings, but not enough to save his side from being relegated bottom of the table.

=== Marseille ===
Following Montpellier's relegation, Bamogo was signed by Ligue 1 giants Marseille for €3 million, where, alongside Peguy Luyindula, he was given the unenviable task of replacing Didier Drogba, who had just signed for Chelsea. He made his first appearance in Marseille colours in a home fixture against Bordeaux on 7 August 2004, and scored his first goal for his new club a week later against Lille. Bamogo ended the season with 6 goals in 32 appearances, having not managed to make a real impact at Marseille.

The following summer, he played in the first European match of his career, an Intertoto cup fixture against Swiss side Young Boys, before being sent out on loan to fellow Ligue 1 side Nantes.

==== Nantes (loan) ====
Bamogo struggled for game time and consistency at Nantes, only netting 4 times in 31 appearances, many of which were off the bench, albeit that one of those goals was against his parent club at the Stade Vélodrome.

==== Return to Marseille ====
On returning from his loan spell, Bamogo was reintegrated into Marseille's first-team squad, but once again struggled for game time and consistency, only scoring five times in six months, of which three were in the league and one was in the UEFA Cup.

==== Celta Vigo (loan) ====
Half-way through the 2006–07 season, Bamogo was again sent out on loan, this time to La Liga outfit Celta Vigo, in a loan deal including a €2 million option to buy. He would go on to only score twice in 15 appearances for the Spanish club, who decided against signing him on a permanent deal.

=== Nice ===
==== Initial loan ====
In August 2007, Bamogo was once again sent on loan to another French top flight side, this time local rivals Nice, and with an identical option to buy of €2 million. He quickly integrated into the team, sufficiently convincing those at the club to sign him permanently, which they did on 11 January 2008, despite there still being six months left on his loan contract.

==== Permanent signing ====
Bamogo ended his first season at Nice with 3 goals in 38 appearances. The following season saw an improved output from the striker, who found the back of the net 9 times in 39 appearances. However, with the arrivals of Mamadou Bagayoko and Anthony Mounier, and the breakthrough of Loïc Rémy, he saw reduced game time from the 2009/10 season, only playing 14 matches and going goalless, followed by 13 appearances with one goal the season after.

=== Later career ===
==== Panetolikos ====
In the summer of 2011, he joined Greek club Panetolikos F.C., who were newly promoted to the Greek Super League. However, he didn't manage to score in 4 appearances, before cancelling his contract with the club in December due to concerns about the club's financial status and ability to pay its players.

==== Doncaster Rovers ====
On 23 December 2011, Bamogo agreed to sign a short-term contract with English Championship side Doncaster Rovers, joining the club alongside fellow France-based signings Damien Plessis and Mamadou Bagayoko. However, it wasn't until 31 January 2012 that he actually made his league debut for Doncaster, starting in the club's 0–0 draw away at Hull City, and he was released at the end of the season, having only made four appearances for the Yorkshire side as they finished rock bottom and were relegated.

==== Botev Plovdiv ====
Bamogo joined Bulgarian A Professional Football Group side Botev Plovdiv on a two-year contract in October 2012. He failed to impress and ended his contract by mutual termination on 22 February 2013 after just 5 games for the club.

==== Persiram Raja Ampat ====
After more than a year without a club, Bamogo joined Indonesia Soccer Championship side Persiram Raja Ampat in May 2014. In his second season, however, the league was cancelled by the Indonesian FA due to alleged government meddling, and Bamogo never played another professional game again.

== Post-playing career ==
Following his playing career, Bamogo became a scout, and is currently working for Premier League side Everton, scouting France-based players.

== International career ==
Bamogo was first called up to the France U21 team in 2003, and would go on to make 14 appearances and score 5 goals for Les Espoirs.

In 2004, 2005, and the summer of 2006, he was shortlisted for the France national team, but was never actually included in a squad.

In October 2009, Bamogo made his debut for the Burkina Faso national team, scoring on his debut against Guinea, which would be his only international goal. He made his final international appearance in an African Cup of Nations qualification tie against the Gambia in September 2010, totalling 6 international caps overall.

== Career statistics ==
Scores and results list Burkina Faso's goal tally first.

No	Date	Venue	Opponent	Score	Result	Competition
1.	11 October 2009	Ohene Djan Stadium, Accra, Ghana	Guinea	2–0	2–1	2010 FIFA World Cup qualification
