= Alain Cantareil =

French footballer (born 1983)

Personal information
- Date of birth: 15 August 1983 (age 43)
- Place of birth: Marseille, France
- Height: 1.78 m (5 ft 10 in)
- Position: Left-back

Senior career*
Years	Team	Apps	(Gls)
2004–2007	Marseille	9	(0)
2004–2005	→ Nîmes (loan)	33	(1)
2007–2009	Lorient	19	(0)
2008–2009	→ Ajaccio (loan)	13	(0)
2009–2011	Nice	14	(0)
2011–2012	Rouen	10	(0)
2012–2015	Istres		
2015–2017	Toulon	26	(3)
- * Club domestic league appearances and goals

Alain Cantareil (born 15 August 1983) is a French former professional footballer who played as a left-back.
