= Mickaël Pagis =

French footballer (born 1973)

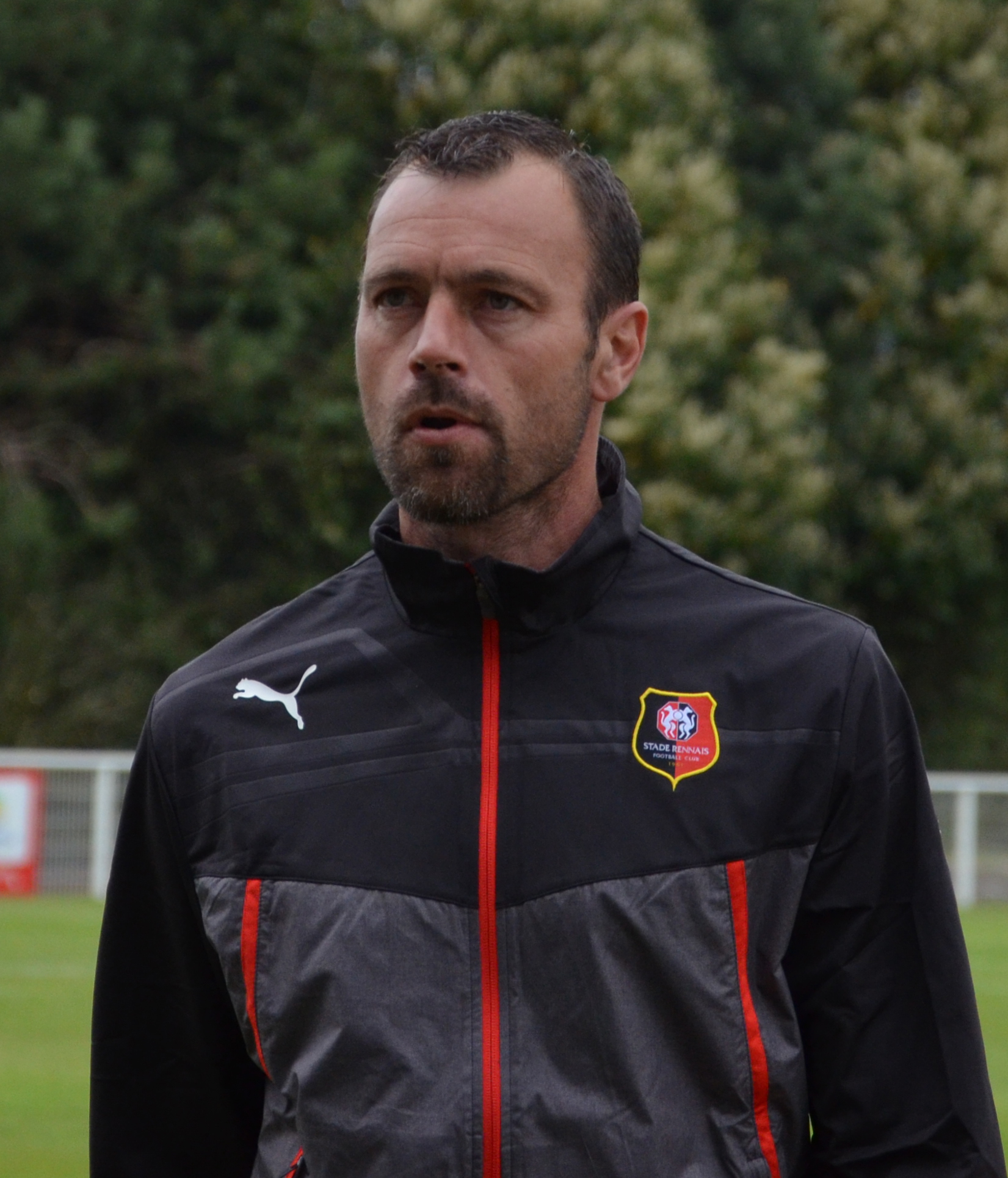
- Pagis in 2014

Personal information
- Full name: Mickaël Serge Pagis
- Date of birth: 17 August 1973 (age 53)
- Place of birth: Angers, Maine-et-Loire, France
- Height: 1.80 m (5 ft 11 in)
- Position: Forward

Senior career*
Years	Team	Apps	(Gls)
1993–1998	Laval	97	(13)
1995–1996	→ Châtellerault (loan)	26	(13)
1998–1999	Gazélec Ajaccio	33	(17)
1999–2001	Nîmes	55	(23)
2001–2004	Sochaux	107	(26)
2004–2005	Strasbourg	46	(21)
2006–2007	Marseille	62	(18)
2007–2010	Rennes	57	(18)
Total		483	(149)

International career
- France beach
- * Club domestic league appearances and goals

Mickaël Serge Pagis (born 17 August 1973) is a French former professional footballer who played as a forward. He is a beach soccer player.

== Career ==
Pagis' nickname is "Pagistral", based on his name and the French word "magistral" (brilliant). A firm favourite at Strasbourg, he scored many goals and was the club's top goal scorer in the 2004–05 season.

The brightest moment of his career came in a game against the defending champions Olympique Lyonnais on 5 October 2008, when he scored a hat-trick.

Pagis plays beach soccer for the France national team. He scored a hat-trick against Russia at the European FIFA Beach Soccer World Cup Qualification Tournament, 7 July 2012.

== Personal life ==
Pagis is the father of the French footballer Pablo Pagis.

== Honours ==
Sochaux

- Coupe de la Ligue: 2003–04
- Division 2: 2000–01

Strasbourg

- Coupe de la Ligue: 2004–05

Individual

- Division 2 Player of the Year: 1999–2000
