= 1998–99 Olympique de Marseille season =

Marseille
1998–99 season
- Chairman: Robert Louis-Dreyfus
- Manager: Rolland Courbis
- Division 1: 2nd
- Coupe de France: Round of 32
- Coupe de la Ligue: Round of 32
- UEFA Cup: Runners-up
- Top goalscorer: Florian Maurice (14)
Home colours	Away colours	Third colours

Olympique de Marseille had their best season since the bribery affair burst in 1993, reaching the UEFA Cup final and only just being defeated by Bordeaux in the domestic championship. Laurent Blanc, Christophe Dugarry and Fabrizio Ravanelli were among the crucial players in the Marseille resurgence. When those players left, l'OM fell into pieces.

== Players ==
=== First-team squad ===
Squad at end of season

Note: Flags indicate national team as defined under FIFA eligibility rules; some limited exceptions apply. Players may hold more than one non-FIFA nationality.

No.	Pos.	Nation	Player
1	GK	GER	Andreas Köpke
2	DF	FRA	Patrick Blondeau
3	DF	FRA	Patrick Colleter
4	DF	RSA	Pierre Issa
5	DF	FRA	Laurent Blanc
6	MF	FRA	Eric Roy
7	MF	FRA	Robert Pires
8	MF	FRA	Frédéric Brando
9	FW	FRA	Florian Maurice
10	MF	FRA	Jocelyn Gourvennec
11	FW	ITA	Fabrizio Ravanelli
12	MF	CIV	Tchiressoua Guel
13	FW	GUI	Titi Camara
15	FW	GHA	Arthur Moses

No.	Pos.	Nation	Player
16	GK	FRA	Stéphane Porato
17	DF	CIV	Cyril Domoraud
19	FW	FRA	Cédric Mouret
21	FW	FRA	Christophe Dugarry
22	DF	FRA	Martial Robin
23	DF	FRA	William Gallas
25	MF	COM	Hamada Jambay
26	MF	FRA	Peter Luccin
27	MF	FRA	Daniel Bravo
28	DF	BRA	Edson (on loan from Sport Recife)
29	DF	FRA	Jacques Abardonado
30	GK	FRA	François Lemasson
—	DF	FRA	Serge Blanc
—	MF	TOG	Chérif Touré Mamam

== Competitions ==
=== Division 1 ===
==== League table ====
Pos	Team	Pld	W	D	L	GF	GA	GD	Pts	Qualification or relegation
1	Bordeaux (C)	34	22	6	6	66	29	+37	72	Qualification to Champions League first group stage
2	Marseille	34	21	8	5	56	28	+28	71	Qualification to Champions League first group stage
3	Lyon	34	18	9	7	51	31	+20	63	Qualification to Champions League third qualifying round
4	Monaco	34	18	8	8	52	32	+20	62	Qualification to UEFA Cup first round
5	Rennes	34	17	8	9	45	38	+7	59	Qualification to Intertoto Cup third round

Source: Ligue 1
Rules for classification: 1) points; 2) goal difference; 3) number of goals scored.
(C) Champions

==== Results summary ====
Overall								Home						Away					
Pld	W	D	L	GF	GA	GD	Pts	W	D	L	GF	GA	GD	W	D	L	GF	GA	GD
34	21	8	5	56	28	+28	71	13	4	0	36	9	+27	8	4	5	20	19	+1

Source: LFP.fr

==== Results by round ====
Round	1	2	3	4	5	6	7	8	9	10	11	12	13	14	15	16	17	18	19	20	21	22	23	24	25	26	27	28	29	30	31	32	33	34
Ground	H	A	H	A	H	H	A	H	A	H	A	H	A	H	A	H	A	H	A	H	A	A	H	A	H	A	H	A	H	A	H	A	H	A
Result	W	W	W	D	D	D	W	W	W	W	W	W	W	W	L	D	D	W	W	W	D	L	W	L	W	D	W	W	W	L	D	L	W	W
Position	2	3	1	2	4	3	3	2	2	2	1	1	1	1	1	2	2	2	1	1	1	2	1	2	1	2	2	2	1	1	1	2	2	2

Source: LFP.fr
A = Away; H = Home; W = Win; D = Draw; L = Loss

==== Matches ====
8 August 1998 1	Marseille	2–0	Nantes	Marseille
20:00	Ravanelli 49'; Maurice 90'			Stadium: Stade Vélodrome; Attendance: 56,232; Referee: Bernard Saules

15 August 1998 2	Metz	0–1	Marseille	Metz
20:00			Gourvennec 45'	Stadium: Stade Saint-Symphorien; Attendance: 21,544; Referee: Pascal Garibian

22 August 1998 3	Marseille	5–4	Montpellier	Marseille
20:00	Maurice 61'; Dugarry 64', 71'; Roy 84'; Blanc 90' (pen.)		Bakayoko 15', 34'; Robert 19'; Sauzée 23'	Stadium: Stade Vélodrome; Attendance: 50,070; Referee: Alain Sars

29 August 1998 4	Le Havre	0–0	Marseille	Le Havre
20:00				Stadium: Stade Jules Deschaseaux; Attendance: 14,964; Referee: Éric Poulat

11 September 1998 5	Marseille	1–1	Rennes	Marseille
20:00	Maurice 78'		Dogon 90'	Stadium: Stade Vélodrome; Attendance: 46,618; Referee: Serge Leon

20 September 1998 6	Marseille	2–2	Bordeaux	Marseille
18:00	Ravanelli 45'; Roy 56'		Diawara 43', 90'	Stadium: Stade Vélodrome; Attendance: 56,293; Referee: Stéphane Bré

24 September 1998 7	Bastia	0–2	Marseille	Furiani
20:30			Pires 36'; Camara 67'	Stadium: Stade Armand-Cesari; Attendance: 8,459; Referee: Pascal Garibian

3 October 1998 8	Marseille	2–0	Toulouse	Marseille
20:00	Maurice 43'; Ravanelli 86'			Stadium: Stade Vélodrome; Attendance: 46,653; Referee: Jean-Claude Puyalt

16 October 1998 9	Strasbourg	0–2	Marseille	Strasbourg
20:00			Maurice 41', 53'	Stadium: Stade de la Meinau; Attendance: 34,462; Referee: Bruno Ruffray

24 October 1998 10	Marseille	4–0	Sochaux	Marseille
20:00	Ravanelli 43', 90'; Camara 55', 90+1'			Stadium: Stade Vélodrome; Attendance: 49,364; Referee: Gilles Cheron

29 October 1998 11	Lorient	1–3	Marseille	Lorient
20:00	Bouafia 25'		Ravanelli 55', 66'; Pires 87'	Stadium: Stade du Moustoir; Attendance: 13,720; Referee: Patrick Lhermite

6 November 1998 12	Marseille	1–0	Monaco	Marseille
20:30	Maurice 90'			Stadium: Stade Vélodrome; Attendance: 56,300; Referee: Alain Sars

10 November 1998 13	Nancy	2–3	Marseille	Tomblaine
20:30	Cascarino 52'; Soufiane-Koné 89'		Maurice 11', 78'; Gourvennec 22'	Stadium: Stade Marcel Picot; Attendance: 18,516; Referee: Patrick Anton

14 November 1998 14	Marseille	1–0	Lens	Marseille
20:00	Dugarry 31'			Stadium: Stade Vélodrome; Attendance: 50,600; Referee: Pascal Garibian

19 November 1998 15	Lyon	2–1	Marseille	Lyon
20:30	Linarès 17'; Violeau 55'		Maurice 76'	Stadium: Stade de Gerland; Attendance: 39,871; Referee: Jean-Claude Puyalt

29 November 1998 16	Marseille	0–0	Paris Saint-Germain	Marseille
20:30				Stadium: Stade Vélodrome; Attendance: 56,346; Referee: Stéphane Bré

4 December 1998 17	Auxerre	1–1	Marseille	Auxerre
20:00	Carnot 85'		Blanc 60'	Stadium: Stade de l'Abbé-Deschamps; Attendance: 19,566; Referee: Laurent Duhamel

12 December 1998 18	Marseille	3–0	Metz	Marseille
20:00	Camara 29'; Maurice 44'; Gourvennec 90'			Stadium: Stade Vélodrome; Attendance: 46,317; Referee: Philippe Kalt

16 December 1998 19	Montpellier	0–1	Marseille	Montpellier
20:00			Maurice 41'	Stadium: Stade de la Mosson; Attendance: 23,341; Referee: Bernard Saules

19 December 1998 20	Marseille	2–0	Le Havre	Marseille
20:00	Pires 32', 70'			Stadium: Stade Vélodrome; Attendance: 46,842; Referee: Stéphane Moulin

16 January 1999 21	Rennes	1–1	Marseille	Rennes
20:00	Arribagé 12'		Camara 78'	Stadium: Stade de la Route de Lorient; Attendance: 19,261; Referee: Gilles Cheron

29 January 1999 22	Bordeaux	4–1	Marseille	Bordeaux
20:30	Wiltord 14', 32'; Micoud 17'; Laslandes 20'		Dugarry 59'	Stadium: Stade Chaban-Delmas; Attendance: 33,208; Referee: Bernard Saules

6 February 1999 23	Marseille	3–1	Bastia	Marseille
20:00	Bravo 33'; Ravanelli 40', 81'		Laurent 76'	Stadium: Stade Vélodrome; Attendance: 48,269; Referee: Jean-Claude Puyalt

14 February 1999 24	Toulouse	1–0	Marseille	Toulouse
20:30	Oceano 75' (pen.)			Stadium: Stade de Toulouse; Attendance: 35,830; Referee: Damien Ledentu

25 February 1999 25	Marseille	1–0	Strasbourg	Marseille
20:00	Pires 47'			Stadium: Stade Vélodrome; Attendance: 46,170; Referee: Bruno Ruffray

9 March 1999 26	Sochaux	0–0	Marseille	Montbéliard
18:30				Stadium: Stade Auguste Bonal; Attendance: 8,882; Referee: Éric Poulat

20 March 1999 27	Marseille	4–1	Lorient	Marseille
20:00	Ravanelli 17', 72'; Maurice 49'; Gourvennec 77' (pen.)		Camadini 87'	Stadium: Stade Vélodrome; Attendance: 47,305; Referee: Franck Glochon

2 April 1999 28	Monaco	1–2	Marseille	Monaco
20:30	Ikpeba 28'		Camara 15'; Ravanelli 48'	Stadium: Stade Louis II; Attendance: 14,464; Referee: Rémi Harrel

15 April 1999 29	Marseille	4–0	Nancy	Marseille
20:00	Edson 30'; Gourvennec 58'; Ravanelli 63'; Maurice 80'			Stadium: Stade Vélodrome; Attendance: 23,306; Referee: Patrick Lhermite

24 April 1999 30	Lens	4–0	Marseille	Lens
20:00	Vairelles 43', 70'; Moreira 67', 76'			Stadium: Stade Félix-Bollaert; Attendance: 40,323; Referee: Gilles Cheron

30 April 1999 31	Marseille	0–0	Lyon	Marseille
20:00				Stadium: Stade Vélodrome; Attendance: 57,414; Referee: Stéphane Bré

4 May 1999 32	Paris Saint-Germain	2–1	Marseille	Paris
20:30	Simone 84'; Rodriguez 88'		Maurice 21'	Stadium: Parc des Princes; Attendance: 44,939; Referee: Alain Sars

22 May 1999 33	Marseille	1–0	Auxerre	Marseille
20:00	Luccin 13'			Stadium: Stade Vélodrome; Attendance: 55,243; Referee: Pascal Garibian

29 May 1999 34	Nantes	0–1	Marseille	Nantes
20:00			Pires 38'	Stadium: Stade de la Beaujoire; Attendance: 35,437; Referee: Stéphane Bré

=== Coupe de France ===
23 January 1999 Round of 64	Marseille	2–0	Auxerre	Marseille
20:45 CET (UTC+1)	Maurice 25' (pen.); Ravanelli 38'			Stadium: Stade Vélodrome; Attendance: 17,130; Referee: Pascal Garibian

20 February 1999 Round of 32	Lens	3–1	Marseille	Lens
17:00 CET (UTC+1)	Brunel 38'; Vairelles 45'; Nouma 52'		Moses 65'	Stadium: Stade Félix Bollaert; Attendance: 40,000; Referee: Stéphane Bré

=== Coupe de la Ligue ===
10 January 1999 Second round	Marseille	1–1 (a.e.t.) (5–6 p)	Lens	Caen
20:35 CET (UTC+1)	Dugarry 64'		Lachor (yellow card) 78'; Nouma 84'; Méride (red card) 101'	Stadium: Stade Michel d'Ornano; Attendance: 18,500; Referee: Bruno Derrien

=== UEFA Cup ===
==== First round ====
15 September 1988 First leg	Sigma Olomouc (Czech Republic)	2–2	(France) Marseille	Olomouc, Czech Republic
19:00	Heinz 35', 41'	Report	Ravanelli 29'; Roy 83'	Stadium: Andrův stadion Attendance: 6,558; Referee: Fiorenzo Treossi (Italy)

29 September 1998 Second leg	Marseille (France)	4–0 (6–2 agg.)	(Czech Republic) Sigma Olomouc	Marseille, France
19:00	Dugarry 19', 76'; Pires 23', 86'	Report		Stadium: Stade Vélodrome; Attendance: 17,868; Referee: Hartmut Strampe (Germany)

==== Second round ====
20 October 1998 First leg	Werder Bremen (Germany)	1–1	(France) Marseille	Bremen, Germany
20:45	Herzog 69'	Report	Maurice 67'	Stadium: Weser-Stadion; Attendance: 22,000; Referee: Miroslav Radoman (Yugoslavia)

3 November 1998 Second leg	Marseille (France)	3–2 (4–3 agg.)	(Germany) Werder Bremen	Marseille, France
21:00	Maurice 36'; Issa 52'; Dugarry 77'	Report	Eilts 48'; Herzog 82'	Stadium: Stade Vélodrome; Attendance: 50,000; Referee: Paul Durkin (England)

==== Third round ====
24 November 1998 First leg	Monaco (France)	2–2	(France) Marseille	Monaco
20:30	Trezeguet 17' (pen.); Giuly 56'	Report	Pires 10'; Camara 39'	Stadium: Stade Louis II; Attendance: 15,500; Referee: Armand Ancion (Belgium)

8 December 1998 Second leg	Marseille (France)	1–0 (3–2 agg.)	(France) Monaco	Marseille, France
21:00	Camara 71'	Report		Stadium: Stade Vélodrome; Attendance: 60,000; Referee: Piero Ceccarini (Italy)

==== Quarter-finals ====
2 March 1999 First leg	Marseille (France)	2–1	(Spain) Celta Vigo	Marseille, France
21:15	Maurice 33', 68'	Report	Mostovoi 64'	Stadium: Stade Vélodrome; Attendance: 54,137; Referee: Dick Jol (Netherlands)

16 March 1999 Second leg	Celta Vigo (Spain)	0–0 (1–2 agg.)	(France) Marseille	Vigo, Spain
21:45		Report		Stadium: Balaídos; Attendance: 32,000; Referee: Pierluigi Collina (Italy)

==== Semi-finals ====
6 April 1999 First leg	Marseille (France)	0–0	(Italy) Bologna	Marseille, France
20:45		Report		Stadium: Stade Vélodrome; Attendance: 57,300; Referee: Ryszard Wójcik (Poland)

20 April 1999 Second leg	Bologna (Italy)	1–1 (1–1a agg.)	(France) Marseille	Bologna, Italy
19:30	Paramatti 18'	Report	Blanc 86' (pen.)	Stadium: Stadio Renato Dall'Ara; Attendance: 38,000; Referee: Markus Merk (Germany)

==== Final ====
12 May 1999 Final	Parma (Italy)	3–0	(France) Marseille	Moscow, Russia
20:00	Crespo 26'; Vanoli 36'; Chiesa 55'	Report		Stadium: Luzhniki Stadium; Attendance: 62,000; Referee: Hugh Dallas (Scotland)

== Top scorers ==
=== Division 1 ===
- (France) Florian Maurice 14
- (Italy) Fabrizio Ravanelli 13
- (France) Robert Pires 6
- (Guinea) Titi Camara 6
- (France) Christophe Dugarry 4
