= 1999 UEFA Cup final =

- Match programme cover
- Event: 1998–99 UEFA Cup
Parma	Marseille
(Italy)	(France)
3	0
- Date: 12 May 1999
- Venue: Luzhniki Stadium, Moscow
- Man of the Match: Hernán Crespo (Parma)
- Referee: Hugh Dallas (Scotland)
- Attendance: 61,000

The 1999 UEFA Cup final was an association football match played on 12 May 1999 at the Luzhniki Stadium in Moscow to determine the winners of the 1998–99 UEFA Cup. The match was contested by Parma of Italy and Marseille of France. Parma won the match 3–0 to claim their second UEFA Cup and fourth European trophy, having previously won the UEFA Cup Winners' Cup and the UEFA Super Cup on one occasion each. There were 61,000 spectators at the match, making it the highest-attended single-legged UEFA Cup/Europa League final.

== Background ==
This was Parma's second UEFA Cup final, having defeated Juventus in 1995. They had won the 1992–93 European Cup Winners' Cup and the 1993 European Super Cup and lost the 1994 European Cup Winners' Cup final. Marseille had won the UEFA Champions League in 1993 after losing the 1991 final.

The Luzhniki Stadium in Moscow, Russia played host to the match, having never previously hosted a major European final.

== Route to the final ==
Parma				Marseille
Opponent	Result	Legs	Round	Opponent	Result	Legs
(Turkey) Fenerbahçe	3–2	0–1 away; 3–1 home	First round	(Czech Republic) Sigma Olomouc	6–2	2–2 away; 4–0 home
(Poland) Wisła Kraków	3–2	1–1 away; 2–1 home	Second round	(Germany) Werder Bremen	3–2	1–1 away; 2–1 home
(Scotland) Rangers	4–2	1–1 away; 3–1 home	Third round	(France) Monaco	3–2	2–2 away; 1–0 home
(France) Bordeaux	7–2	1–2 away; 6–0 home	Quarter-finals	(Spain) Celta Vigo	2–1	2–1 home; 0–0 away
(Spain) Atlético Madrid	5–2	3–1 away; 2–1 home	Semi-finals	(Italy) Bologna	1–1 (a)	0–0 home; 1–1 away

== Match ==
=== Team selection ===
While Parma's selection for the match was more straightforward, underdogs Marseille had five players suspended for the final after the team's semi-final victory over Bologna, which ended in a fight in the players' tunnel at the Stadio Renato Dall'Ara. Fabrizio Ravanelli, Peter Luccin and William Gallas received yellow cards which barred their participation in the final. Christophe Dugarry and Hamada Jambay would serve the first match of their respective and five- and four-match suspensions on the sidelines for the final for their involvement in the brawl.

=== Summary ===
Hugh Dallas, the Scottish referee who had also officiated in the Franco-Italian 1998 World Cup quarter-final, conducted the coin toss, which was won by Marseille captain Laurent Blanc and the Frenchman elected to shoot towards his team's own fans in the second half. Roberto Sensini, Parma's captain, chose to kick the match off.

The first 25 minutes saw a cautious Marseille side play much of their football in their own half, only to knock it long to their isolated frontmen Robert Pires and Florian Maurice. Following such an occasion, Sensini hit a long ball forward towards Juan Sebastián Verón, whose headed flick-on looked not to be dangerous until a lazy headed backpass from the experienced Laurent Blanc gifted Hernán Crespo one-on-one with the keeper; the Argentine coolly lobbed Stéphane Porato with his first touch to give Parma the lead after 26 minutes.

Ten minutes later, as the Italians continued to dominate the match, a Parma attack twice looked to have been ended by Marseille's defence, but the ball found Lilian Thuram in an advanced right-back position on both occasions. On the second occasion, Thuram was able to slide in to find Diego Fuser five yards from the byline and just onside. He whipped in a deep cross, and Paolo Vanoli directed his header past Marseille's goalkeeper into the net to double Parma's advantage.

Five minutes before the hour mark, Thuram surged forward down the right before giving the ball to Verón outside him. Verón chipped the ball into the penalty area with a ball looking to be destined for Crespo's boot, a fine dummy duped the Marseille's defence and gave Enrico Chiesa the opportunity to volley home emphatically from 12 yards to make it 3–0 and seal a Parma victory.

The end of the game saw Parma control the game and keep their lead on the scoreboard against a valiant but dominated Marseille team.

=== Details ===
12 May 1999
22:00 MSD (UTC+4)

Parma (Italy)	3–0	(France) Marseille
Crespo 25'; Vanoli 36'; Chiesa 55'	Report

Luzhniki Stadium, Moscow
Attendance: 61,000
Referee: Hugh Dallas (Scotland)

Parma	Marseille

GK	1	(Italy) Gianluigi Buffon
RCB	21	(France) Lilian Thuram
CB	17	(Italy) Fabio Cannavaro
LCB	6	(Argentina) Roberto Sensini (c)
CM	8	(Italy) Dino Baggio
CM	15	(France) Alain Boghossian
RW	7	(Italy) Diego Fuser
AM	11	(Argentina) Juan Sebastián Verón		(substituted off) 77'
LW	24	(Italy) Paolo Vanoli
CF	9	(Argentina) Hernán Crespo		(substituted off) 84'
CF	20	(Italy) Enrico Chiesa		(substituted off) 73'
Substitutes:
GK	28	(Italy) Davide Micillo
DF	4	(Italy) Luigi Sartor
DF	14	(Italy) Roberto Mussi
DF	26	(Italy) Luigi Apolloni
MF	23	(Italy) Stefano Fiore		(substituted on) 77'
FW	10	(Colombia) Faustino Asprilla	(yellow card) 89'	(substituted on) 84'
FW	18	(Argentina) Abel Balbo		(substituted on) 73'
Manager:
(Italy) Alberto Malesani

GK	16	(France) Stéphane Porato
SW	5	(France) Laurent Blanc (c)
CB	4	(South Africa) Pierre Issa
CB	17	(Ivory Coast) Cyril Domoraud
RWB	2	(France) Patrick Blondeau	(yellow card) 50'
LWB	28	(Brazil) Edson		(substituted off) 46'
CM	8	(France) Frédéric Brando
CM	27	(France) Daniel Bravo
AM	10	(France) Jocelyn Gourvennec
CF	7	(France) Robert Pires
CF	9	(France) Florian Maurice
Substitutes:
GK	30	(France) François Lemasson
DF	12	(Ivory Coast) Tchiressoua Guel
DF	29	(France) Jacques Abardonado
MF	22	(France) Martial Robin
FW	13	(Guinea) Titi Camara		(substituted on) 46'
FW	15	(Ghana) Arthur Moses
FW	19	(France) Cédric Mouret
Manager:
(France) Rolland Courbis

Man of the Match:
Hernán Crespo (Parma)

Assistant referees:
Robert Gunn (Scotland)
John McElhinney (Scotland)
Fourth official:
William Young (Scotland)

Match rules

- 90 minutes
- 30 minutes of golden goal extra time if necessary
- Penalty shoot-out if scores still level
- Seven named substitutes, of which three may be used

== See also ==
- 1999 UEFA Champions League final
- 1999 UEFA Cup Winners' Cup final
- Olympique de Marseille in European football
- Parma Calcio 1913 in European football
- 1998–99 Olympique de Marseille season
- 1998–99 Parma AC season
