= Souaré =

Souaré is a surname. Notable people with the surname include:

- Ahmed Tidiane Souaré (born 1951), Guinean political figure
- Baba Souare (born 1999), Swiss footballer
- Cheick Souaré (born 2002), French footballer
- Ibrahima Sory Souare (born 1982), Guinean footballer
- Mamadi Souaré (born 1971), Guinean football manager
- Moussa Souare (born 1998), Guinean footballer
- Pape Souaré (born 1990), Senegalese footballer
- Sékou Tidiane Souaré (born 1983), Ivorian footballer
