= Titi Camara =

Guinean footballer (born 1972)

Minister of Sports
- In office 28 December 2010 – 6 October 2012
- President: Alpha Condé
- Prime Minister: Mohamed Said Fofana
- Preceded by: Thierno Aliou Diaouné
- Succeeded by: Sanoussy Bantama Sow

Personal details
- Born: Aboubacar Sidiki Camara; 17 November 1972 (age 53) Conakry, Guinea
Association football career
- Height: 1.84 m (6 ft 0 in)
- Position: Striker
Senior career*
Years	Team	Apps	(Gls)
1990–1995	Saint-Étienne	94	(16)
1995–1997	Lens	111	(14)
1997–1999	Marseille	61	(12)
1999–2000	Liverpool	33	(9)
2000–2003	West Ham United	14	(0)
2003	→ Al-Ittihad (loan)	0	(0)
2003–2004	Al-Siliya	20	(14)
2005–2006	Amiens	26	(9)
Total		359	(74)
International career
1991–2004	Guinea	57	(27)
Managerial career
- 2009: Guinea
- * Club domestic league appearances and goals

Aboubacar Sidiki "Titi" Camara (born 17 November 1972) is a Guinean former professional footballer who played as a striker. He was also the coach of the Guinea national team, which he captained and played for. He was also the Guinea sports minister, before being replaced in October 2012. He is best known for his stint with Liverpool in the 1999–2000 season, where he scored 10 goals in 37 games in all competitions, memorably scoring the winner in a game against Arsenal at Highbury.

== Club career ==
=== Early career ===
Camara played for Saint-Étienne, Lens and Marseille in France, (playing in the 1999 UEFA Cup Final for the latter) before being transferred to Liverpool.

=== Liverpool ===
A cult hero and crowd favourite at Anfield, Camara is best remembered for playing at Anfield against West Ham in October 1999, the morning after the death of his father, scoring the winning goal and then dropping to his knees in front of the Anfield Road stand with tears flowing. He also managed to score in three successive Premier League games for the Reds in late autumn of 1999. On 13 February, he scored the winner at Highbury, leading Liverpool to a 1–0 win over Arsenal. Despite his short spell at Liverpool, he was voted in 91st position in the 2006 poll "100 Players Who Shook The Kop", which was conducted by the official Liverpool Football Club web site. Camara's placing made him the second highest placed African player, behind Bruce Grobbelaar.

=== West Ham United ===
Signed by manager Harry Redknapp on 21 December 2000 for a fee of £1.5 million which, depending on other factors, could have risen to £2.6 million, Camara announced, "I've come to West Ham to play, play, play – and score, score, score. If it was a question of money, I could have stayed at Liverpool and picked it up. I need to play, and if I don't it is totally pointless." Making his West Ham debut on 23 December 2000 in a 2–1 away defeat to Leicester City, Camara went on to play only fourteen games, in all competitions, without scoring at all.

=== Al-Ittihad ===
In January 2003 Camara was sent out on loan to Al-Ittihad for the remainder of the 2002–03 season.

=== Al-Siliya ===
Following West Ham's relegation in 2003 from the Premier League Camara left the club for Al-Siliya after his contract was terminated by mutual consent.

== International career ==
Titi Camara was a stalwart of the Guinea team from the early 1990s until the early 2000s. He is regarded as a key protagonist in Guinea's return to respectability in African football and played for his country at the 2004 African Nations Cup, where he scored 3 goals in the group stage, which meant he finished just one goal behind the leading scores of the tournament.

Scores and results list Guinea's goal tally first, score column indicates score after each Camara goal.

List of international goals scored by Titi Camara
No.	Date	Venue	Opponent	Score	Result	Competition	Ref.
1	14 July 1991	Stade du 28 Septembre, Conakry, Guinea	Mali	2-0	2-1	1992 African Cup of Nations qualification	
2	16 August 1992	Stade Omnisports Idriss Mahamat Ouya, N'Djamena, Chad	Chad	2-0	3-0	1994 African Cup of Nations qualification	
3	20 December 1992	Stade du 28 Septembre, Conakry, Guinea	Kenya	3-0	4-0	1994 FIFA World Cup qualification	
4	20 December 1992	Stade du 28 Septembre, Conakry, Guinea	Kenya	4-0	4-0	1994 FIFA World Cup qualification	
5	2 May 1993	Stade du 28 Septembre, Conakry, Guinea	Zimbabwe	1-0	3-0	1994 FIFA World Cup qualification	
6	11 July 1993	Intwari Stadium, Bujumbura, Burundi	Burundi	1-1	2-2	1994 African Cup of Nations qualification	
7	18 January 1994	Conakry, Guinea	Ivory Coast	—	3-0	Friendly	
8	29 March 1994	Stade Olympique de Sousse, Sousse, Tunisia	Senegal	1-0	1-2	1994 African Cup of Nations	
9	4 September 1994	Botswana National Stadium, Gaborone, Botswana	Botswana	1-0	1-0	1996 African Cup of Nations qualification	
10	16 October 1994	Stade du 28 Septembre, Conakry, Guinea	Angola	2-0	3-1	1996 African Cup of Nations qualification	
11	30 July 1995	Stade du 28 Septembre, Conakry, Guinea	Mali	1-1	4-1	1996 African Cup of Nations qualification	
12	30 July 1995	Stade du 28 Septembre, Conakry, Guinea	Mali	2-1	4-1	1996 African Cup of Nations qualification	
13	1 June 1996	Estádio 24 de Setembro, Bissau, Guinea-Bissau	Guinea-Bissau	1-2	2-3	1998 FIFA World Cup qualification	
14	1 June 1996	Estádio 24 de Setembro, Bissau, Guinea-Bissau	Guinea-Bissau	2-2	2-3	1998 FIFA World Cup qualification	
15	10 November 1996	Stade du 28 Septembre, Conakry, Guinea	Kenya	1-1	3-1	1998 FIFA World Cup qualification	
16	8 January 1997	Stade de la Paix, Bouaké, Ivory Coast	Ivory Coast	1-0	1-2	Friendly	
17	5 April 1997	National Stadium, Lagos, Nigeria	Nigeria	1-2	1-2	1998 FIFA World Cup qualification	
18	23 April 2000	Stade du 28 Septembre, Conakry, Guinea	Uganda	1-0	3-0	2002 FIFA World Cup qualification	
19	18 June 2000	Stade du 28 Septembre, Conakry, Guinea	Zimbabwe	2-0	3-0	2002 FIFA World Cup qualification	
20	16 July 2000	Stade du 28 Septembre, Conakry, Guinea	Gambia	1-0	2-0	2002 African Cup of Nations qualification	
21	13 January 2002	Prince Moulay Abdellah Stadium, Rabat, Morocco	Morocco	1-1	1-2	Friendly	
22	8 September 2002	Stade du 28 Septembre, Conakry, Guinea	Liberia	1-0	3-0	2004 African Cup of Nations qualification	
23	20 January 2004	Stade Gérard Rossi, Sainte-Maxime, France	Burkina Faso	1-0	1-0	Friendly	
24	25 January 2004	El Menzah Stadium, Tunis, Tunisia	DR Congo	1-1	2-1	2004 African Cup of Nations	
25	28 January 2004	15 October Stadium, Bizerte, Tunisia	Rwanda	1-0	1-1	2004 African Cup of Nations	
26	1 February 2004	Hammadi Agrebi Stadium, Tunis, Tunisia	Tunisia	1-1	1-1	2004 African Cup of Nations	

== Coaching career ==
In December 2005, he was linked with the vacant manager's job with the Guinea national team. On 13 May 2009, Captain Moussa Dadis Camara, the President of Guinea publicly announced that he wanted him to manage the national team. At the end of May 2009, Camara was named the National Technical Director (NTC). On 9 June 2009, Camara was named the head coach of the Syli National to succeed Robert Nouzaret. Camara was serving in dual capacities of NTC and head coach of the Syli National. On 15 September 2009, three months following his nomination as head coach of the Syli National, Camara was replaced by Mamadi Souaré, a former Captain of the Syli National, following poor results, lack of cooperation/understanding with certain conspicuous members of the Guinean Football Federation (FGF), and absence of "cordial" relations with certain key elements of the Syli National.

== Breach of contract ==
In September 2003, alleging breach of contract, Camara sued West Ham United. In 2006, West Ham successfully defended the High Court breach of contract claim brought by Camara.

== Minister of Sports ==
On 28 December 2010, Camara was made Sports Minister of Guinea by newly elected president Alpha Condé, making him the country's first ex-sportsman to hold a government post. He was forced out of his post on 5 October 2012 in a government reshuffle.

== Personal life ==
Camara holds Guinean and French nationalities.
