= Robert Pires =

French footballer (born 1973)

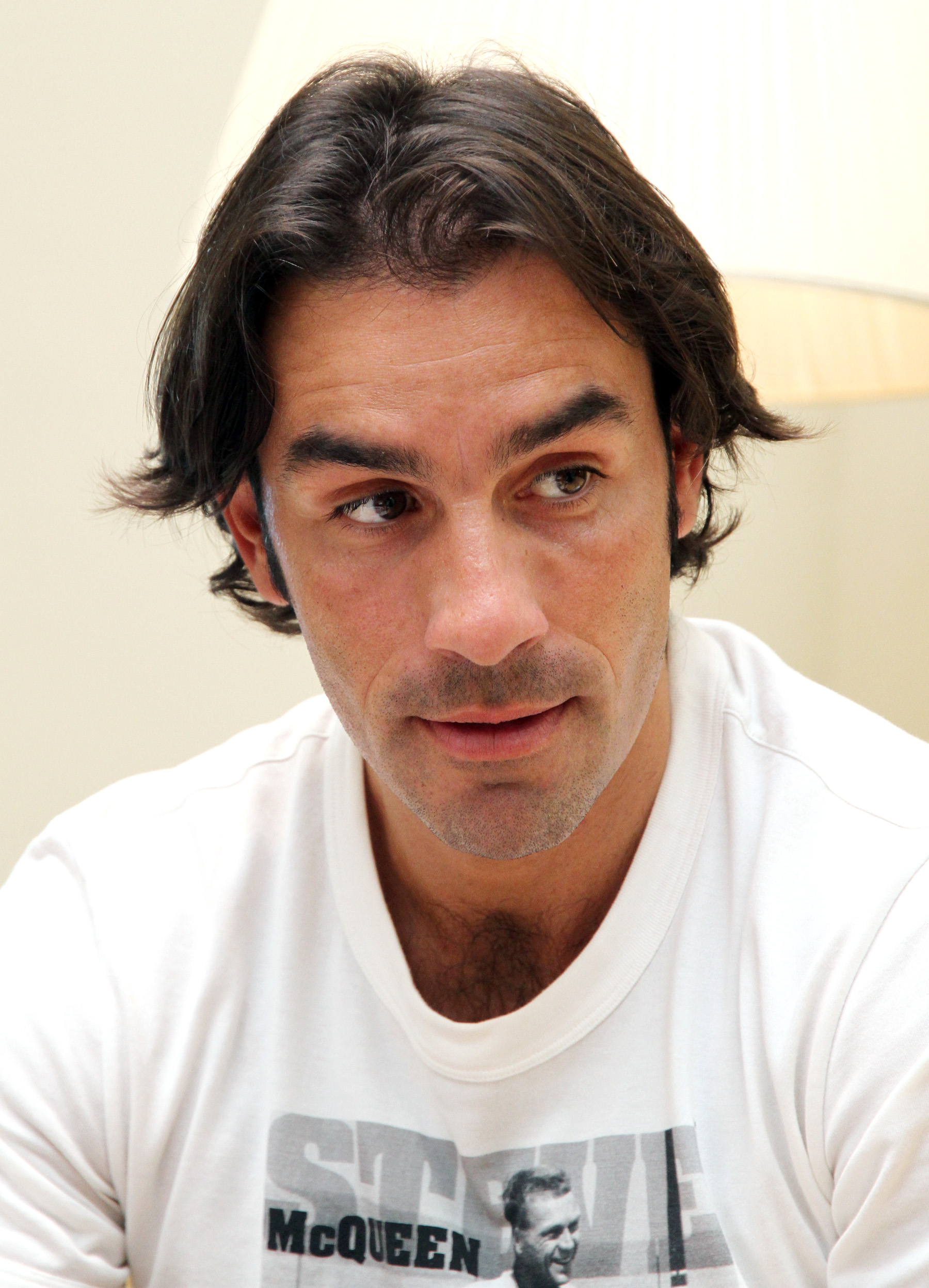
- Pires in 2011

Personal information
- Full name: Robert Emmanuel Pires
- Date of birth: 29 October 1973 (age 53)
- Place of birth: Reims, Marne, France
- Height: 1.85 m (6 ft 1 in)
- Positions: Winger; attacking midfielder

Youth career
- 1980–1989: Reims Sainte-Anne
- 1989–1991: Reims

Senior career*
Years	Team	Apps	(Gls)
1991–1992	Reims	5	(2)
1992–1993	Metz B	23	(5)
1993–1998	Metz	162	(43)
1998–2000	Marseille	66	(8)
2000–2006	Arsenal	189	(62)
2006–2010	Villarreal	103	(13)
2010–2011	Aston Villa	9	(0)
2014–2015	Goa	8	(1)
Total		565	(134)

International career
1995–1996	France U21	12	(5)
1996–2004	France	79	(14)
Medal record
Men's football
Representing France
FIFA World Cup
Winner	1998
UEFA European Championship
Winner	2000
FIFA Confederations Cup
Winner	2001
Winner	2003
- * Club domestic league appearances and goals

Robert Emmanuel Pires (born 29 October 1973) is a French former professional footballer. He is widely regarded as one of Arsenal's greatest ever players.

Pires played for French clubs Metz and Marseille prior to his time with Arsenal, where he won three FA Cups and two Premier League titles, including the club's unbeaten season of 2003–04. A former France international, Pires earned 79 caps between 1996 and 2004 for his country, including winning both the 1998 FIFA World Cup and UEFA Euro 2000. He has been included in the PFA Team of the Year for the 2001–02, 2002–03 and 2003–04 seasons, was the Player of the Tournament for the 2001 FIFA Confederations Cup, FWA Player of the Year for the 2001–02 season, Ligue 1 Young Player of the Year for the 1995–96 season, and was included in the FIFA 100 by Pelé. He was also voted by Arsenal fans as the sixth greatest player in the club's history.

Pires played the majority of his career as a left winger, but could also play all across the midfield or in a position to support the forward line. Following his retirement, Pires returned to Arsenal as an individual coach and later as a coach in Baller League.

== Early life ==
Robert Emmanuel Pires was born on 29 October 1973 in Reims, Marne, France, to a Portuguese father and Spanish mother. Pires, the elder of two boys, spent most of his childhood dressed in two football shirts that reflected his divided loyalty. One was a Benfica shirt (his father was a fan) and the other was a Real Madrid shirt. Pires confessed he had difficulty in school because he did not speak French well at the time, due to the fact his parents only spoke Spanish and Portuguese. His passion for football was inherited from his father, António, who played with Les Corpo, a local team, and every Saturday night Pires would watch him play. At the age of 15, Pires left school and began his dream of a career in football with a two-year sports degree course in Reims. At the insistence of his mother, Pires continued with Reims and eventually was called up four years later.

== Club career ==
=== Metz ===
Pires is a graduate of the Metz youth academy, making his senior debut in 1993 against Lyon. During his six seasons there, he scored 43 goals in 162 matches, and won the Coupe de la Ligue, prompting a £5 million move to Marseille in 1998. Pires had a mixed two-year stay in Provence; his first season saw Marseille miss the 1998–99 French Division 1 title by a point (he had been even closer the year before when Metz had finished runners-up on goal difference) and they also reached the 1999 UEFA Cup Final, losing to Parma. His second season saw him suffer a spate of on- and off-field problems, which led him to boycott the club at the season's end.

=== Arsenal ===
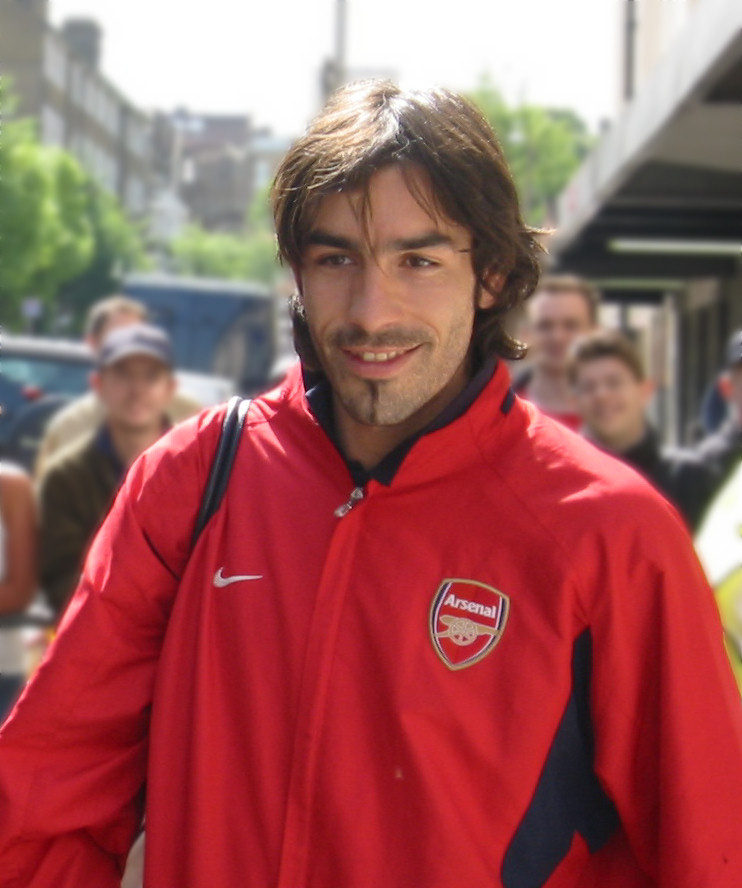
Pires (pictured in 2004) spent six seasons at Arsenal

==== 2000–01 ====
Pires was signed by Arsenal for £6 million in 2000, after stiff competition from Real Madrid and Juventus, replacing Marc Overmars, who had left for Barcelona for a record £25 million. He made his debut as a substitute against Sunderland on 19 August 2000. Initially, Pires' form was indifferent, and some people criticised him after his comments that the English game was too physical. However, he slowly began to regain the form he had shown at Metz, scoring a superb solo goal in October 2000, his first for Arsenal, against Lazio in the 2000–01 Champions League. Days later he scored his first league goal in a 2–1 win against West Ham United. During his time at Arsenal Pires had a habit of scoring against rivals Tottenham Hotspur, something he did on eight occasions. The first of such occasions came in a league game on 31 March 2001 when Arsenal won 2–0. A week later he scored against Tottenham again, this time the winner in the FA Cup semi-finals. However, Arsenal went on to lose the Cup final to Liverpool 2–1; Pires set up Arsenal's goal for Freddie Ljungberg.

==== 2001–02 ====
By 2001–02, Pires had fully got to grips with the English game and had one of his best seasons. Pires scored superb goals against Middlesbrough and Aston Villa. Against Aston Villa, Pires chased after a long ball by Freddie Ljungberg, and lobbed the ball over the pursuing George Boateng, and finished off the move with a delightful lob over Peter Schmeichel. Pires also scored in a 1–1 draw against Tottenham at White Hart Lane, which would commence a sequence of five consecutive league seasons in which he would score in the North London Derby away at their rivals. He led the Premier League assist charts and was voted both FWA Footballer of the Year and Arsenal's player of the season, as Arsenal won the league title. Pires provided the assist for Dennis Bergkamp when he scored his memorable pirouette goal against Newcastle United. However weeks later against the same opposition in the FA Cup Pires suffered a cruciate ligament injury (a game in which he had earlier scored). This also ruled him out of playing in the 2002 FA Cup Final and the 2002 World Cup with France.

==== 2002–03 ====
After a lengthy layoff, Pires made his comeback in November 2002 as a substitute against Auxerre in the UEFA Champions League. Although Pires initially found it tough, he eventually returned to form, scoring 14 Premiership goals in 20 starts that season, including a hat-trick against Southampton on the penultimate day of the season. Other highlights included scoring twice against Fulham, including a last minute winner, and his customary goal at White Hart Lane. Pires was voted the Premier League Player of the Month for February 2003. Pires capped off his season by scoring the winning goal in the FA Cup Final against Southampton.

==== 2003–04 ====
He went on to be a crucial part of Arsenal's quest for the Premier League title in the 2003–04 season, which they achieved, remaining unbeaten and becoming the first English top flight club to do so in 115 years. Pires and his Arsenal teammate Thierry Henry were instrumental in that season, scoring a combined 57 goals in all competitions. Pires made a sluggish start to the campaign, with just one goal to his name (against Everton) prior to October, but a wonder-goal against Liverpool at Anfield kick-started his season. Pires showed football fans his sublime technique, skills and finishing, most notably with his goals against Liverpool, Bolton Wanderers, and Leeds United. He surprised a lot of people with a world class tackle on Claude Makélélé and, following that, a run into the penalty box which dragged William Gallas and John Terry away, thus making space for Patrick Vieira to have a one-on-one with the Chelsea goalkeeper and subsequently scoring. Arsenal won that match 2–1, with Vieira's goal the equaliser. That day of Premier League action proved decisive, as Manchester United's failure to beat Leeds United during the same day resulted in Arsenal getting a huge lead in the title race. Arsenal never lost 1st place in the table for the rest of the season. In the UEFA Champions League quarter-final's 1st leg match against Chelsea, Pires managed to beat John Terry to a header, which resulted in the equaliser for Arsenal, after Eiður Guðjohnsen had given Chelsea the lead. However, Arsenal were eliminated after they lost 1–2 in the return leg, courtesy of an 87th minute Wayne Bridge goal. Pires also scored home and away against Tottenham Hotspur. He showed his playmaking skills in a goal against Tottenham at White Hart Lane, in which Pires was the architect in building up the goal, and capped off the move with a goal to score Arsenal's 2nd goal of the game. Tottenham refused to give up, and managed to claw their way back and claimed a 2–2 draw. Despite that, Arsenal won the title after the match. Pires finished that season with an impressive tally of 14 goals and seven assists in the Premier League. He was Arsenal's second top scorer (behind Thierry Henry) and had the joint amount of assists (along with Dennis Bergkamp) that season.

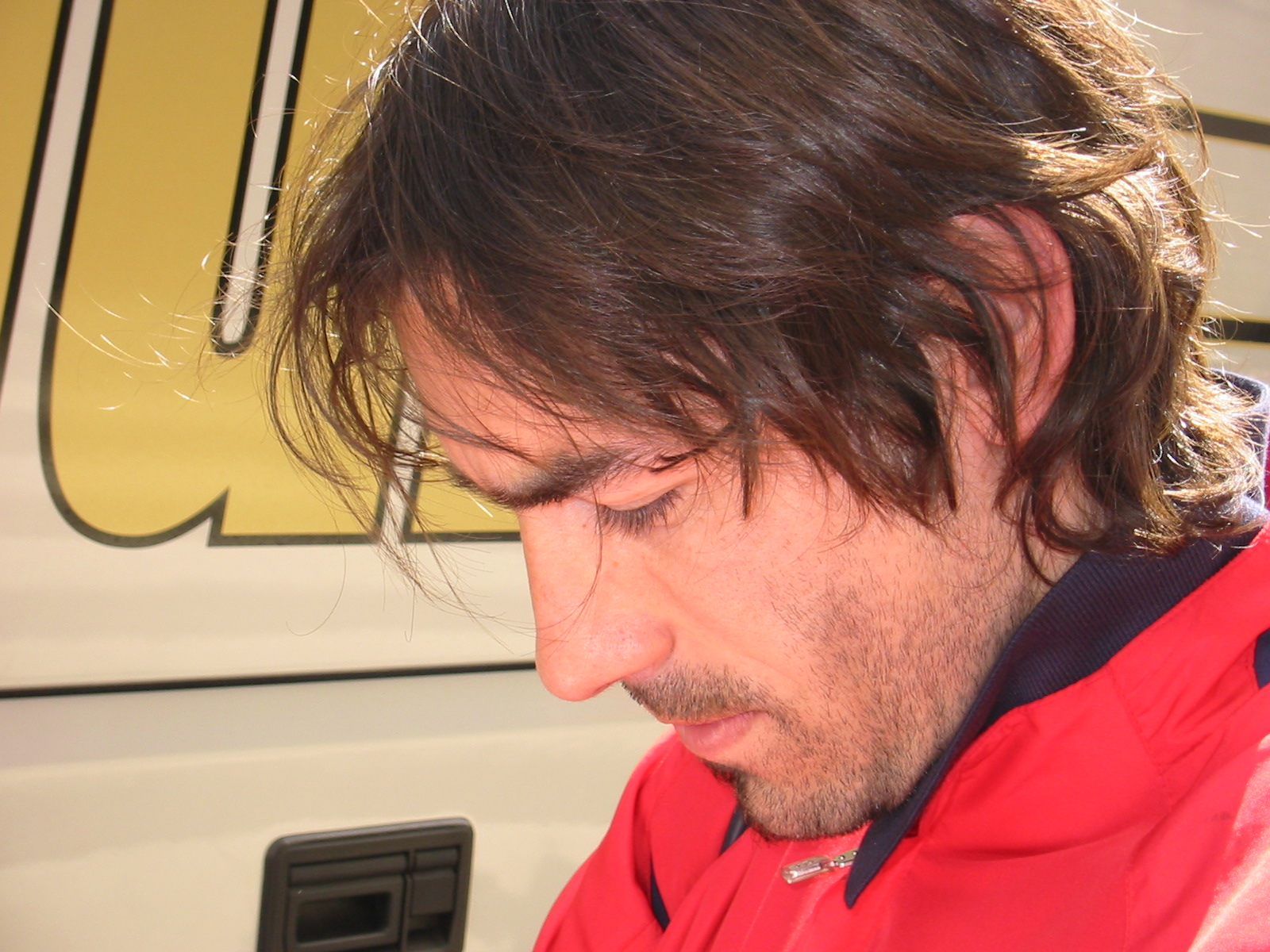
Pires in 2004

==== 2004–05 ====
In the 2004–05 season, Pires finished third in the Premiership goalscorers' table with 14 goals, behind teammate Thierry Henry and Crystal Palace's Andrew Johnson. Pires also picked up a second FA Cup winners' medal; he scored in the semi-final against Blackburn Rovers and then Arsenal beat Manchester United on penalties in the final. Pires was replaced by Edu in the 2nd half of extra time in that match.

==== 2005–06 ====
During the 2005–06 season, Pires started the season poorly, and players such as Freddie Ljungberg, José Antonio Reyes and Alexander Hleb were preferred to him on both wings. As the season progressed, though, Pires' form improved, outscoring his selection rivals overall despite a bizarre penalty incident with Thierry Henry against Manchester City when Pires, having scored from the spot earlier in the game, tried passing it to Arsenal's star striker but Henry missed the ball and it went down as a penalty miss. Highlights in the league that season included scoring at White Hart Lane for the fifth consecutive season (his eighth and final goal against Tottenham) to help Arsenal salvage a 1–1 draw, and also scoring in the last game at Highbury against Wigan Athletic. Pires was instrumental in Arsenal's Quarter Final Champions League first leg against Juventus, where Arsenal won 2–0. Pires successfully tackled Patrick Vieira and fed the ball to Thierry Henry who passed to Fàbregas to score Arsenal's first goal, the first time that Pires had gotten the better of Vieira.

Pires played his last game for Arsenal in the UEFA Champions league final against Barcelona in Paris, which Arsenal ultimately lost 2–1. However, Pires was substituted after only 18 minutes when goalkeeper Jens Lehmann was sent off and had to be replaced with Manuel Almunia. Pires later said Wenger's decision to substitute him "killed" him: "the fact that I was substituted and only allowed to play 18 minutes remains painful, there's no point denying that... Wenger knows it and we still talk about it. I'll never agree that he made the right decision."

==== Departure ====
During the 2005–06 season, Pires wrangled with Arsenal over a new contract, in the hope of a new two-year deal. In keeping with the club's policy regarding players over 30, Pires was only offered a 12-month extension to his contract, which expired in June 2006.

In May 2006, Pires agreed to an offer from Villarreal after a month of speculation, during which time he and Arsenal defeated Villarreal in the Champions League semi-final.

One of the main reasons Pires gave for leaving Arsenal was that he felt he was no longer a first choice under manager Arsène Wenger. Pires was quoted as saying: "I have to say I have had some disappointments this season. For instance, I was on the bench very often". Pires additionally suggested that Wenger's decision to withdraw him in the UEFA Champions League final showed he had slipped in the eyes of his French boss. Pires said that he felt hurt by how Wenger did not trust him anymore, which was a major factor that convinced him that it was time to move on from Arsenal.

On the official Arsenal matchday program for the game against Wigan Athletic on 11 February 2007, Pires revealed his heartbreak of being substituted so early on during the Champions League final. Pires stated: "I was very disappointed. When I saw my number on the fourth official's board to be substituted, I couldn't believe it. It was my last game after six years at the club, a Champions League Final in front of all my family in Paris where I became World Cup champion and it lasted just 12 minutes. That was very hard to take".

On 11 July 2008, Arsenal fans voted Pires as the club's sixth greatest player of all time.

=== Villarreal ===
In May 2006, Pires agreed to join Spanish side Villarreal on a two-year contract. He joined on a free transfer, subject to passing a medical, bringing to an end his six-year career as an Arsenal player. After Villarreal were eliminated in the semi-finals of the 2006 Champions League by Arsenal, Villarreal coach Manuel Pellegrini had wanted to sign Arsenal's Pires or Thierry Henry.

He scored his first goal for the club in 3–3 pre-season draw with Newcastle United on 5 August 2006. However, on 18 August 2006, Pires damaged the cruciate ligament in his left knee in a friendly match against Cádiz and required corrective surgery to alleviate the problem, which kept him out of action for seven months in his new club in Spanish top flight. Pires finally recovered from knee injury and made his first league appearance for Villarreal as a second-half substitute when he was named in Villarreal's squad to face Real Sociedad on 17 March 2007. Pires scored his first league goal on his return from injury in a 3–3 draw away to Real Betis on 31 March 2007. After three appearances as a substitute, Pires made his first start for Villarreal on 22 April 2007 against Barcelona. He opened the scoring for his team to defeat league leaders Barcelona 2–0, avenging his premature departure against Barcelona in the Champions League Final the previous May.

On 13 May 2007, in a 4–1 win at Osasuna, Pires scored a seventh-minute opener as Villarreal continued their late-season push for a European spot. The run took Villarreal, at 11th spot without him in the side, to the brink of a UEFA Cup place in barely six weeks. Villarreal ended the season in 5th spot wherein Pires played crucial roles in helping Villarreal with the late charge up winning each of their final eight games and an entry into the UEFA Cup.

The 2007–08 season was marked by the ongoing saga between Juan Román Riquelme and the board of Villarreal. Despite this distraction, Pires' leadership qualities helped Villarreal to win six of their opening eight games. Against Barcelona at El Madrigal, Pires' technique earned the Yellow Submarine two penalties which were duly converted by captain Marcos Senna. Villarreal ended up finishing second in La Liga behind Real Madrid, which was their best league finish in history, beating Barcelona into third place.

In 2009, Pires faced former club Arsenal in the quarter-finals of the UEFA Champions League, coming on as a 70th-minute substitute in the first leg and playing the full 90 minutes at the Emirates. Villarreal were defeated 4–1 on aggregate, but Pires received a warm return from the Arsenal supporters, who sang his name throughout both legs.

Pires was told in May 2010 that his contract would not be extended and he would have to look for a new club during the summer, as Villarreal will be "changing their philosophy".

=== Aston Villa ===
Pires returned to England and trained at London Colney – Arsenal's training ground, in order to keep his fitness levels up. In October 2010, it was reported that Conference National club Crawley Town intended to talk to Pires about joining them for some part of the season, but the player's spokesman said they were "not aware of any interest" from that club.

On 16 November 2010, Aston Villa boss Gérard Houllier had been in talks with representatives of Pires. On 18 November, the 37-year-old midfielder completed his move to Aston Villa on a six-month contract. He made his Villa début in the Premier League on 21 November as a second-half substitute, although his new club were beaten 2–0 by Blackburn Rovers. Pires' arrival at the club was praised by many of Villa's senior players, including Gabriel Agbonlahor, Stewart Downing Pires scored his first goal for Aston Villa in the 3–1 FA Cup win against Blackburn Rovers on 29 January 2011. His next start was also against Blackburn Rovers in the Premier League on 26 February. His performance in Villa's 4–1 win was described by Sky Sports as "his most influential" since joining the club.

In early March, Pires announced that he would like to remain at Aston Villa for the 2011–12 season. Villa boss Gérard Houllier responded positively to this claim, but admitted that no decision would be made until the Summer of 2011. However, he was released by the club on 27 May 2011 after the 2010–11 season finished.

In September 2011, Pires made a guest appearance for Scottish Premier League side Hibernian in Ian Murray's Testimonial match at Easter Road.

=== Goa, India (retirement and coaching) ===
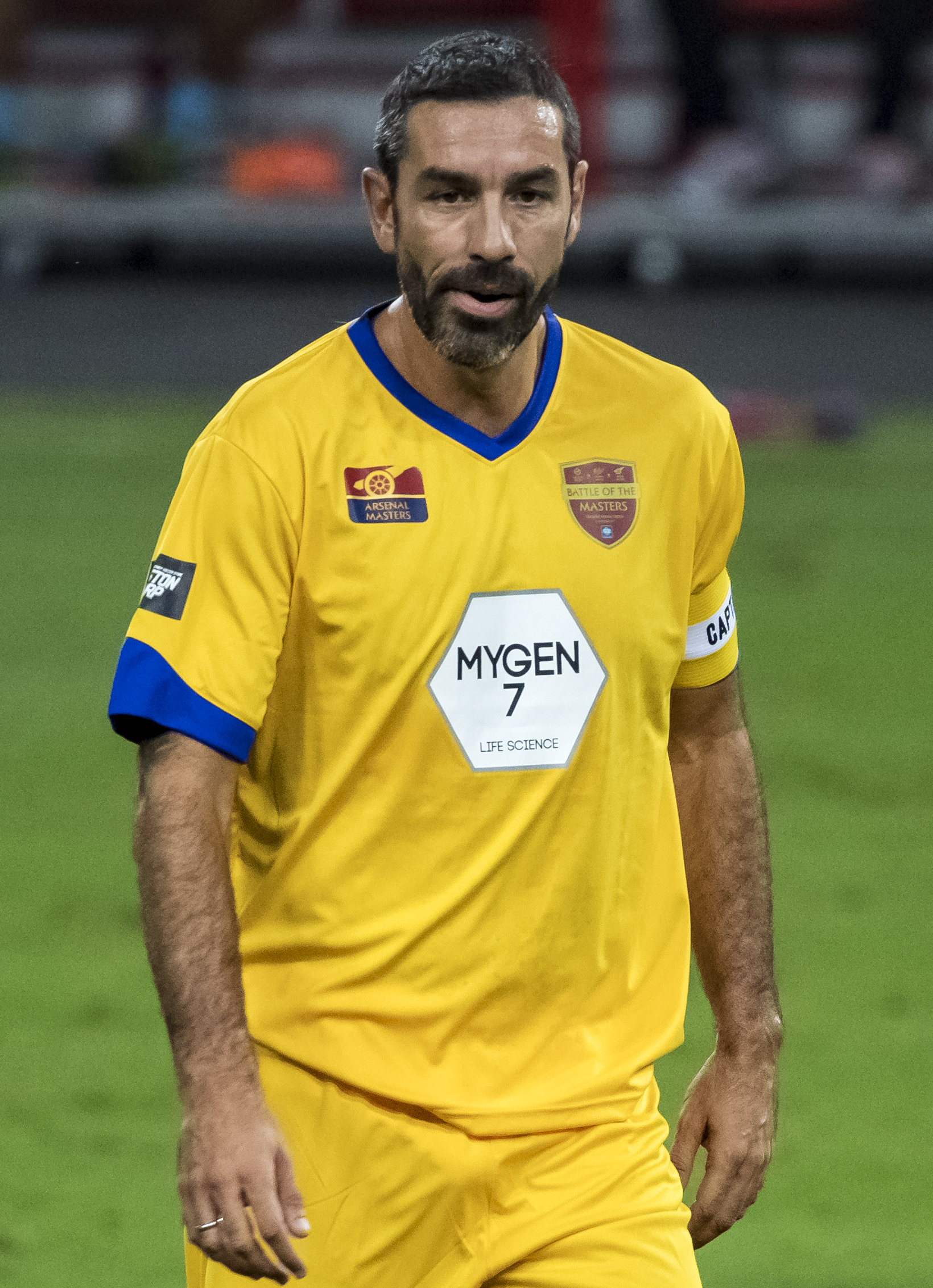
Pires in 2017

In September 2013, Pires made a guest appearance for Premier League Aston Villa in Stiliyan Petrov's Testimonial match at Celtic Park.

In July 2014, Pires announced a comeback to promote the launch of the Indian Super League. On 2 September 2014, he was signed by Goa, becoming their marquee signing. The 40-year-old came out of retirement to play for Goa, one of eight teams in the newly created league, and he captained the team.

"For me the project and the passion for the game are very important. India needs a start. You need to progress. And for me, that was important. I had offers from the USA and Qatar but I wanted to be part of a new beginning for the sport in India. As for the conditions, we all know about them – but I'm ready and training hard. I like the pressure", he said. Pires is a regular at Arsenal's training ground, using the facilities to stay fit, and said that he spoke to Arsène Wenger about playing in India: "He told me if you have it in you and if you have the passion to go play in India, then do it. And I think I'm ready." "The reception at the airport was amazing", he said, on his unveiling in India, before adding, "Thank you for the welcome India... and the spicy food."

Pires made his league debut for Goa on 15 October 2014, a 2–1 defeat to Chennaiyin.

On 25 October 2014, he was given a two-match ban for insulting Atlético de Kolkata's manager Antonio López Habas. He scored his first league goal on 13 November 2014 in a 4–1 away win over Delhi Dynamos.

Pires was released by Goa on 13 March 2015. On 25 February 2016, Pires announced his retirement from professional football.

Pires expressed interest in and was approached by Arsène Wenger with regard to coaching. Pires soon began working at Arsenal as an individual coach in 2016, though would depart in 2017.

In November 2024, it was announced that Pires set to manage one of the 12 teams in the upcoming UK edition of Baller League, a six-a-side football league. Pires was the coach of N5 FC alongside former Arsenal teammates Freddie Ljungberg and Jens Lehmann for the league's first season.

== International career ==
Pires was part of France's 1998 World Cup and Euro 2000 winning squads, but had to miss the 2002 World Cup due to an injury he sustained playing for Arsenal. He also played in the 1996 Olympic Games and Euro 2004. However, a dispute in late 2004 with French national coach Raymond Domenech put a halt to Pires' international career. He won 79 caps for his country and scored 14 goals. He won the Golden Ball (for most outstanding football) and Golden Shoe (for most goals scored) awards at the 2001 Confederations Cup in Korea/Japan. Pires provided a golden goal assist during his international career, providing David Trézéguet with the match-winning ball in the Euro 2000 final.

== Personal life ==
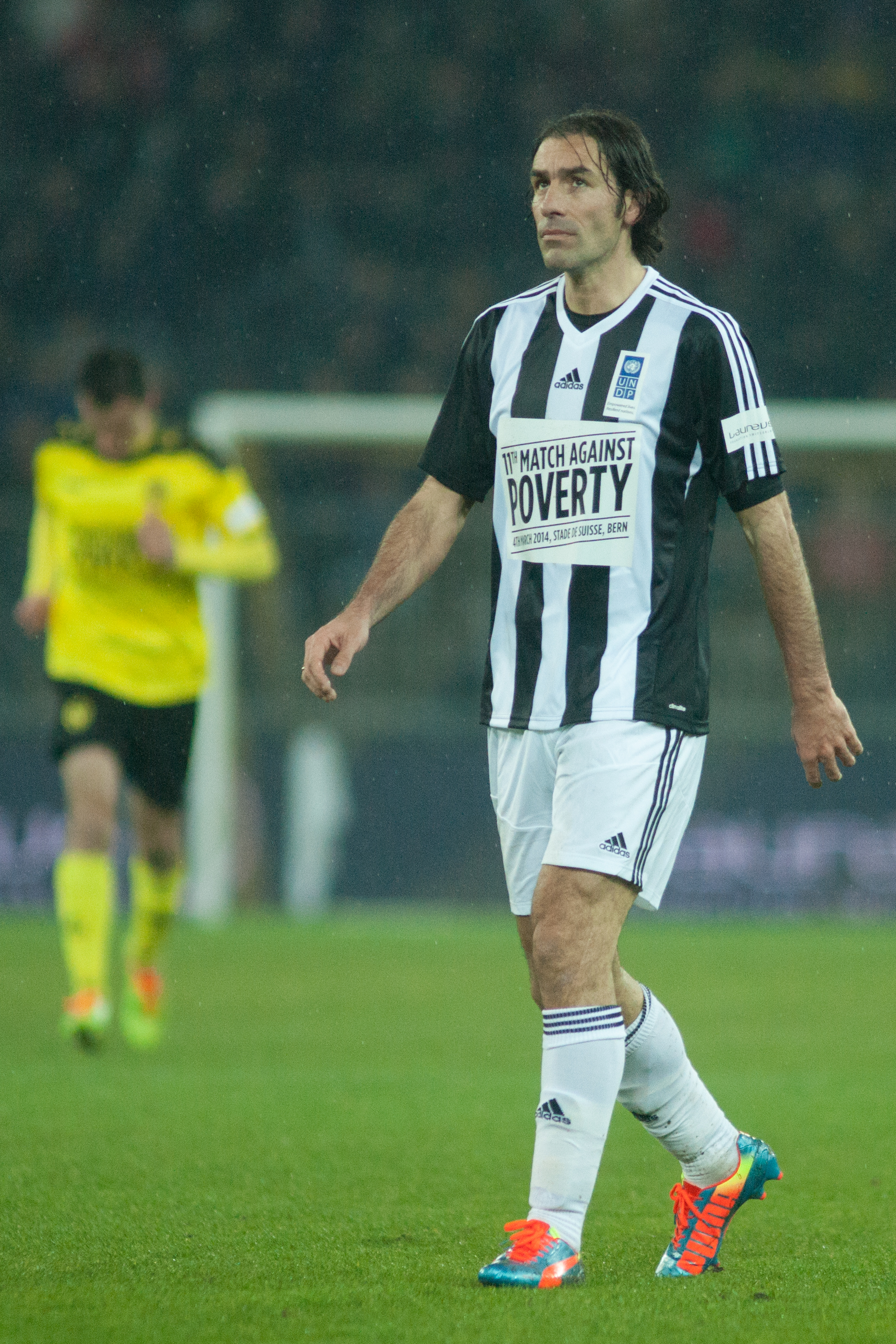
Pires playing in a charity match in March 2014

In 1992, during his initial year at Metz, Pires met his first wife, Nathalie. The two were married for six years and divorced in 2003. Pires told The Daily Mirror that his divorce had ruined him and affected him professionally, interfering with his concentration and sleep. He also blamed it for his odd behavior, such as publicly fighting with French coach Raymond Domenech in early 2004.

Shortly after the split from Nathalie, Pires met French model Jessica Lemarie through mutual friends. On 10 August 2005, she gave birth to the couple's first child, Naia. Since then, Lemarie and Pires have married and had a son named Theo, born 11 July 2007.

On 17 January 2012, Pires became an ambassador for Grassroot Soccer, an international non-profit that uses the power of football to educate, inspire, and mobilize communities to stop the spread of HIV.

== Career statistics ==
=== Club ===
Appearances and goals by club, season and competition
Club!	Season	League			Cup		League Cup		Continental		Other		Total	
Club!	Season	Division	Apps	Goals	Apps	Goals	Apps	Goals	Apps	Goals	Apps	Goals	Apps	Goals
Metz	1992–93	Division 1	2	0	1	0	—		—		—		3	0
Metz	1993–94	Division 1	24	1	1	0	—		—		—		28	1
Metz	1994–95	Division 1	35	9	5	0	1	0	0	0	—		36	9
Metz	1995–96	Division 1	38	11	2	1	5	1	4	0	—		49	13
Metz	1996–97	Division 1	32	11	1	1	2	0	6	0	—		41	12
Metz	1997–98	Division 1	31	11	6	2	3	0	3	0	—		41	13
Metz	Total		162	43	12	2	11	3	13	0	—		198	48
Marseille	1998–99	Division 1	34	6	1	0	1	0	11	3	—		47	9
Marseille	1999–2000	Division 1	32	2	2	1	1	0	11	2	—		46	5
Marseille	Total		66	8	3	1	2	0	22	5	—		93	14
Arsenal	2000–01	Premier League	33	4	6	3	0	0	12	1	—		51	8
Arsenal	2001–02	Premier League	28	9	5	1	0	0	12	3	—		47	13
Arsenal	2002–03	Premier League	26	14	6	1	1	1	9	0	0	0	42	16
Arsenal	2003–04	Premier League	36	14	4	1	0	0	10	4	1	0	51	19
Arsenal	2004–05	Premier League	33	14	6	2	0	0	8	1	0	0	48	17
Arsenal	2005–06	Premier League	33	7	1	2	1	0	12	2	1	0	48	11
Arsenal	Total		189	62	28	10	2	1	63	11	2	0	284	84
Villarreal	2006–07	La Liga	11	3	0	0	—		2	0	—		13	3
Villarreal	2007–08	La Liga	32	3	5	1	—		2	0	—		39	4
Villarreal	2008–09	La Liga	32	3	0	0	—		8	1	—		40	4
Villarreal	2009–10	La Liga	28	4	2	1	—		7	2	—		37	7
Villarreal	Total		103	13	7	2	—		19	3	—		129	18
Aston Villa	2010–11	Premier League	9	0	2	1	1	0	—		—		12	1
Goa	2014	Indian Super League	8	1	0	0	—		—		—		8	1
Career total			537	127	52	16	16	4	117	19	2	0	724	166

=== International ===
Appearances and goals by national team and year
National team	Year	Apps	Goals
France	1997	11	1
France	1998	14	1
France	1999	9	1
France	2000	10	2
France	2001	13	4
France	2002	1	0
France	2003	12	4
France	2004	13	0
Total		79	14

Scores and results list France's goal tally first, score column indicates score after each Pires goal.

List of international goals scored by Robert Pires
No.	Date	Venue	Opponent	Score	Result	Competition
1	9 October 1996	Parc des Princes, Paris, France	Turkey	4–0	4–0	Friendly
2	26 February 1997	Parc des Princes, Paris, France	Netherlands	1–1	2–1	Friendly
3	10 October 1998	Luzhniki Stadium, Moscow, Russia	Russia	2–0	3–2	UEFA Euro 2000 qualifying
4	13 November 1999	Stade de France, Saint-Denis, France	Croatia	1–0	3–0	Friendly
5	28 May 2000	Maksimir Stadium, Zagreb, Croatia	Croatia	1–0	2–0	Friendly
6	16 August 2000	Stade Vélodrome, Marseille, France	FIFA XI	4–0	5–1	Friendly
7	3 June 2001	Ulsan Munsu Football Stadium, Ulsan, South Korea	Mexico	3–0	4–0	2001 FIFA Confederations Cup
8	7 June 2001	Suwon World Cup Stadium, Suwon, South Korea	Brazil	1–0	2–1	2001 FIFA Confederations Cup
9	15 August 2001	Stade de la Beaujoire, Nantes, France	Denmark	1–0	1–0	Friendly
10	6 October 2001	Stade de France, Saint-Denis, France	Algeria	4–1	4–1	Friendly
11	30 April 2003	Stade de France, Saint-Denis, France	Egypt	3–0	5–0	Friendly
12	20 June 2003	Stade Geoffroy-Guichard, Saint-Étienne, France	Japan	1–0	2–1	2003 FIFA Confederations Cup
13	22 June 2003	Stade de France, Saint-Denis, France	New Zealand	5–0	5–0	2003 FIFA Confederations Cup
14	26 June 2003	Stade de France, Saint-Denis, France	Turkey	2–0	3–2	2003 FIFA Confederations Cup

== Honours ==
Metz

- Coupe de la Ligue: 1995–96

Marseille

- UEFA Cup runner-up: 1998–99

Arsenal

- Premier League: 2001–02, 2003–04
- FA Cup: 2002–03, 2004–05; runner-up: 2000–01
- UEFA Champions League runner-up: 2005–06

France

- FIFA World Cup: 1998
- UEFA European Championship: 2000
- FIFA Confederations Cup: 2001, 2003

Individual

- Division 1 Young Player of the Year: 1995–96
- FWA Footballer of the Year: 2001–02
- PFA Team of the Year: 2001–02 Premier League, 2002–03 Premier League, 2003–04 Premier League
- Ballon d'Or nominee: 1997, 2001, 2003
- Premier League Player of the Month: February 2003
- Arsenal Player of the Season: 2001−02
- FIFA Confederations Cup Golden Ball: 2001
- FIFA Confederations Cup Golden Shoe: 2001
- FIFA 100
- Équipe type spéciale 20 ans des trophées UNFP: 2011

Orders

- Knight of the Legion of Honour: 1998
