= Agostinho Soares =

Guinea-Bissauan footballer

Nconco
Personal information
- Full name: Agostinho Soares Nconco
- Date of birth: 27 January 1990 (age 36)
- Place of birth: Bissau, Guinea-Bissau
- Height: 1.83 m (6 ft 0 in)
- Position: Left-back

Team information
- Current team: Vila Real
- Number: 16

Senior career*
Years	Team	Apps	(Gls)
2007–2010	Bamako		
2010	Benfica de Bissau		
2012	Pelotas		
2013	Pesqueira	6	(2)
2013–2017	Covilhã	106	(4)
2017–2018	Cinfães	19	(2)
2018–2020	Covilhã	12	(0)
2020–2021	Vila Real	11	(1)
2021–2022	Santa Marta	22	(0)
2022–	Vila Real	29	(2)

International career^{‡}
2007–	Guinea-Bissau	9	(0)
- * Club domestic league appearances and goals as of 15:56, 24 December 2023 (UTC) ‡ National team caps and goals as of 7 August 2021

Agostinho Soares Nconco (born 27 January 1990), known simply as Nconco, is a Guinea-Bissauan professional footballer who plays for Portuguese club Vila Real as a left back.
