= Olympique de Marseille in European football =

French club in European football

- Club: Olympique de Marseille
- Seasons played: 44
- Most appearances: Steve Mandanda (101)
- Top scorer: Jean-Pierre Papin (23)
- First entry: 1962–63 Inter-Cities Fairs Cup
- Latest entry: 2026–27 UEFA Europa League

Titles
- Champions League: 1: 1993
- Europa League: 0
- Cup Winners' Cup: 0
- Intertoto Cup: 1: 2005
- Super Cup: 0

This article lists results for Olympique de Marseille in European competitions. They are the French team to have played the most finals of UEFA competitions and the first one to have won the UEFA Champions League.

== Honours ==
- European Cup/UEFA Champions League
  - Winners (1): 1992–93
  - Runners-up (1): 1990–91
- UEFA Cup/UEFA Europa League
  - Runners-up (3): 1998–99, 2003–04, 2017–18
- UEFA Intertoto Cup
  - Winners (1): 2005

== Participations ==
As of September 2026, Marseille have competed in:

In italic are competitions that ceased to exist.

- 18 participations in the European Cup/UEFA Champions League
- 3 participations in the European Cup Winners' Cup
- 17 participations in the UEFA Cup/UEFA Europa League
- 3 participations in the Inter-Cities Fairs Cup
- 1 participation in the UEFA Europa Conference League
- 2 participations in the UEFA Intertoto Cup
- 2 participations in the Intertoto Cup (non UEFA-administered)

== Overall record ==
=== UEFA competitions statistics ===
Accurate as of 17 September 2026

Competition	Played	Won	Drew	Lost	GF	GA	GD	Win%
European Cup/UEFA Champions League	124	50	19	55	176	155	+21	40.32
Cup Winners' Cup	14	8	2	4	19	13	+6	57.14
UEFA Cup/UEFA Europa League	122	49	35	38	176	148	+28	40.16
UEFA Europa Conference League	8	6	1	1	15	7	+8	75.00
UEFA Intertoto Cup	8	4	3	1	16	9	+7	50.00
Total	276	117	60	99	402	332	+70	42.39

Legend: GF = Goals For. GA = Goals Against. GD = Goal Difference.

=== Non-UEFA competitions statistics ===
Accurate as of 30 April 2018

Competition	Played	Won	Drew	Lost	GF	GA	GD	Win%
Inter-Cities Fairs Cup	6	3	0	3	7	9	−2	50.00
Intertoto Cup	12	4	5	3	20	17	+3	33.33
Total	18	7	5	6	27	26	+1	38.89

Legend: GF = Goals For. GA = Goals Against. GD = Goal Difference.

== Matches in Europe ==
Marseille's score listed first.

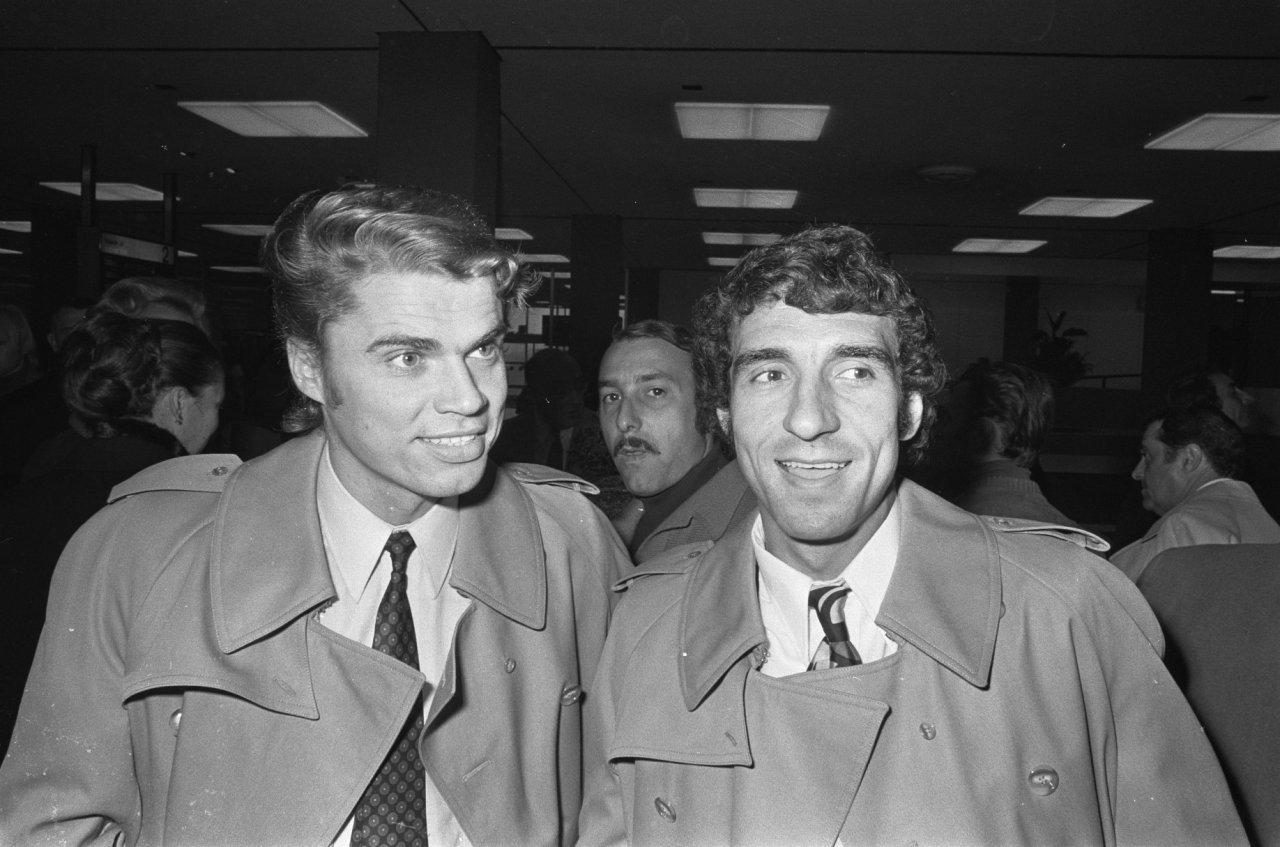
Roger Magnusson and Bernard Bosquier at Amsterdam Airport Schiphol for OM vs Ajax in 1971

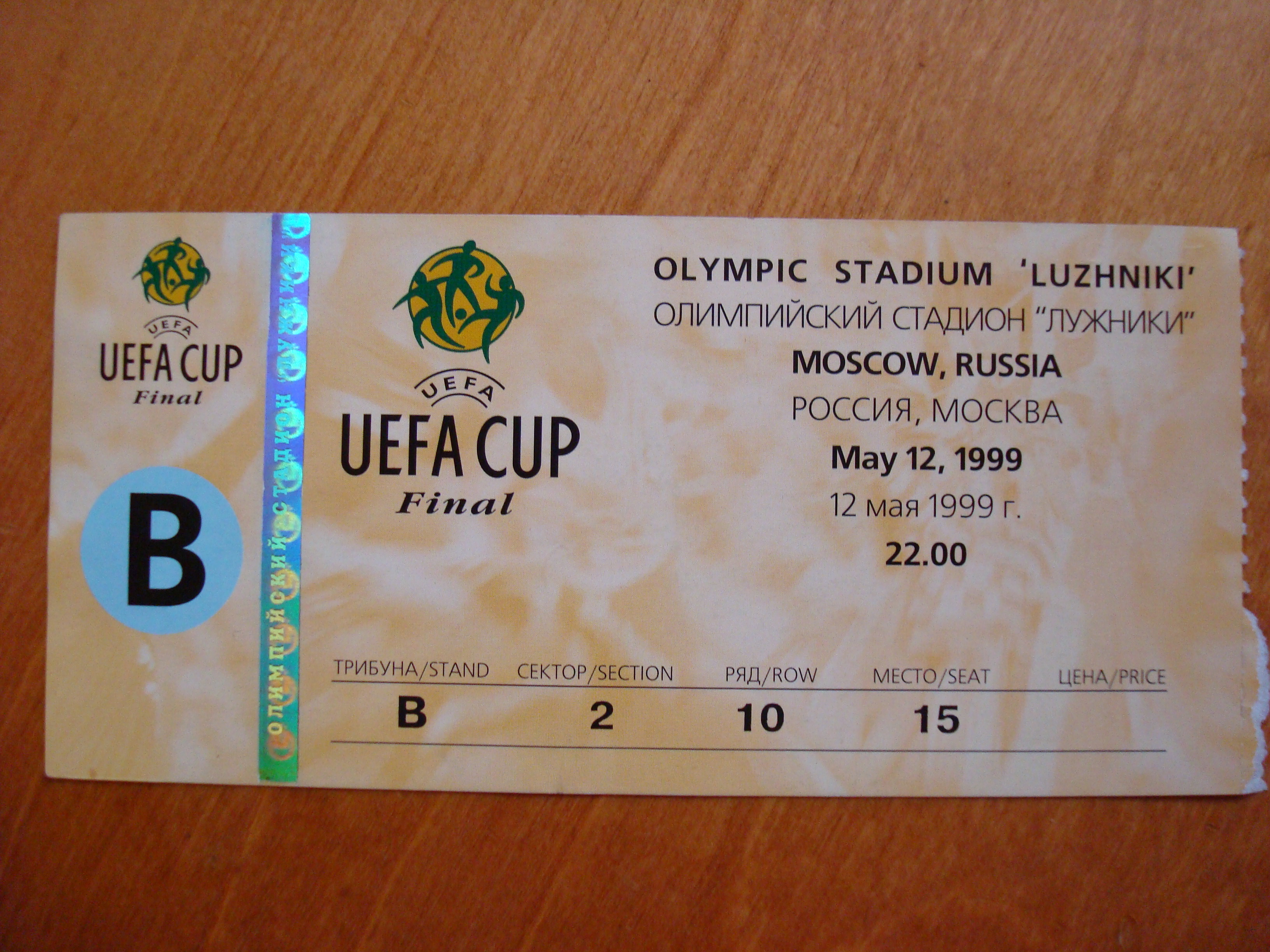
Ticket from the 1999 UEFA Cup final, when Marseille were beaten by Parma

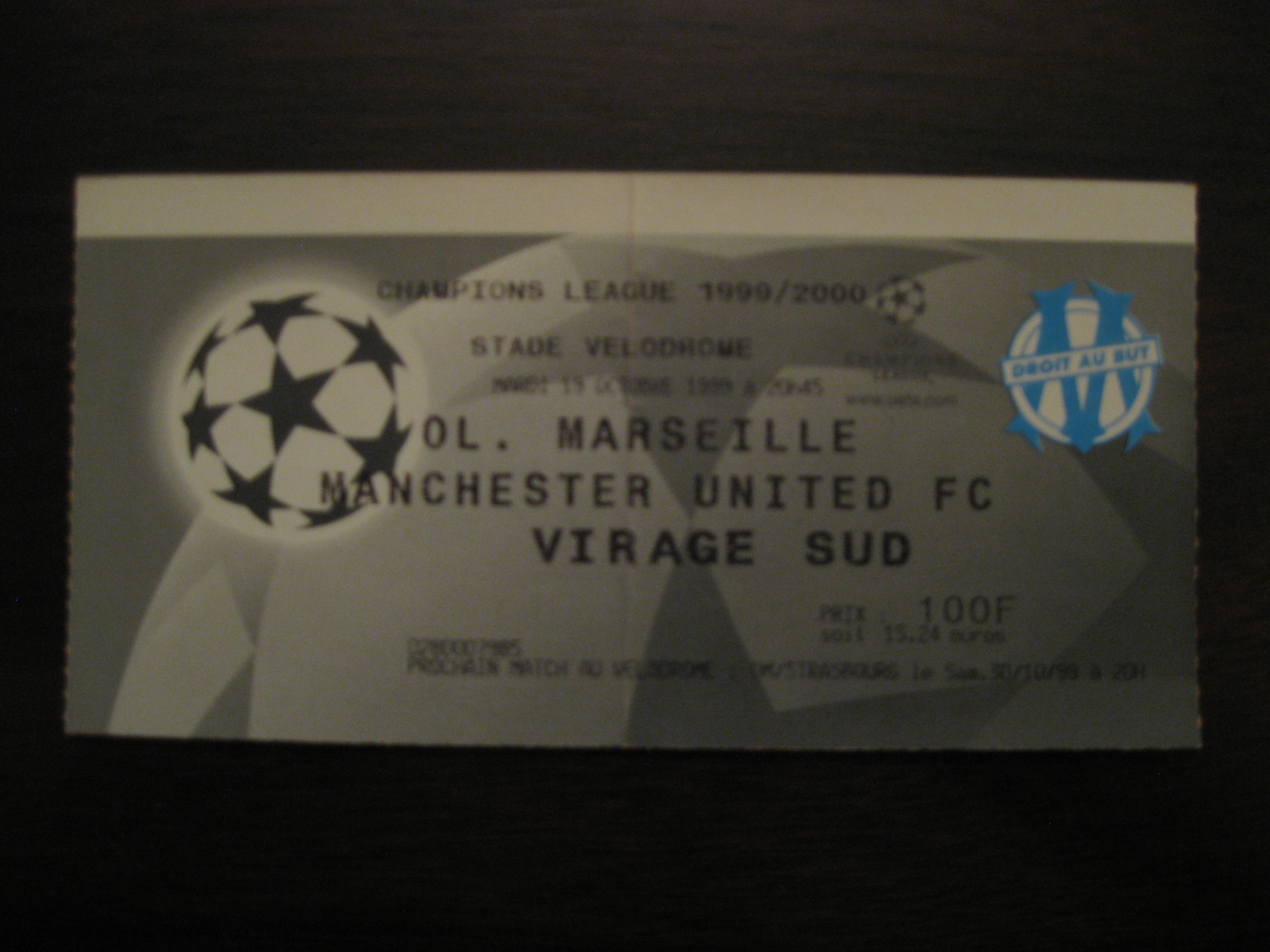
Ticket from the match when Marseille beat European champions Manchester United in the 1999–2000 UEFA Champions League

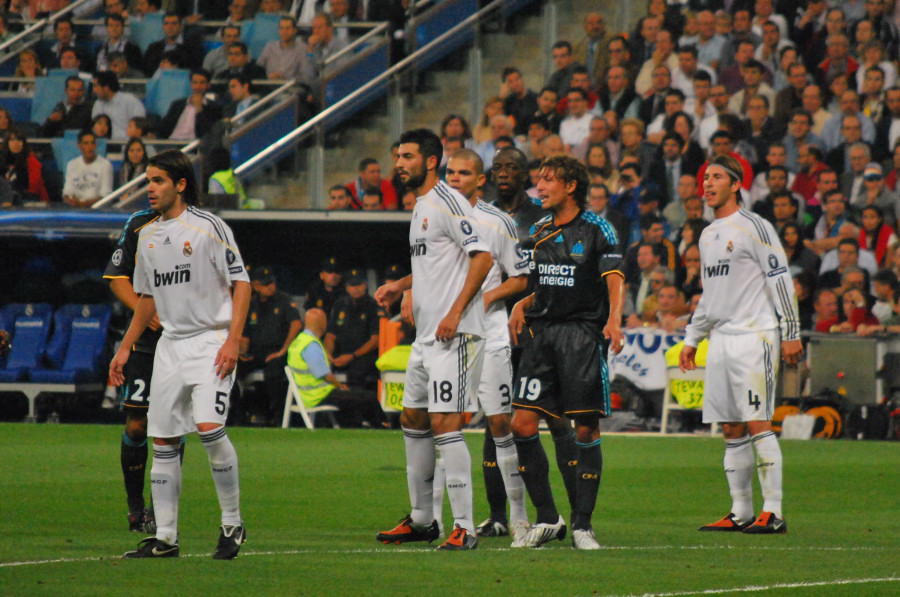
Gabriel Heinze (no.19) faces his former club, in Marseille's 2009 clash with Real Madrid

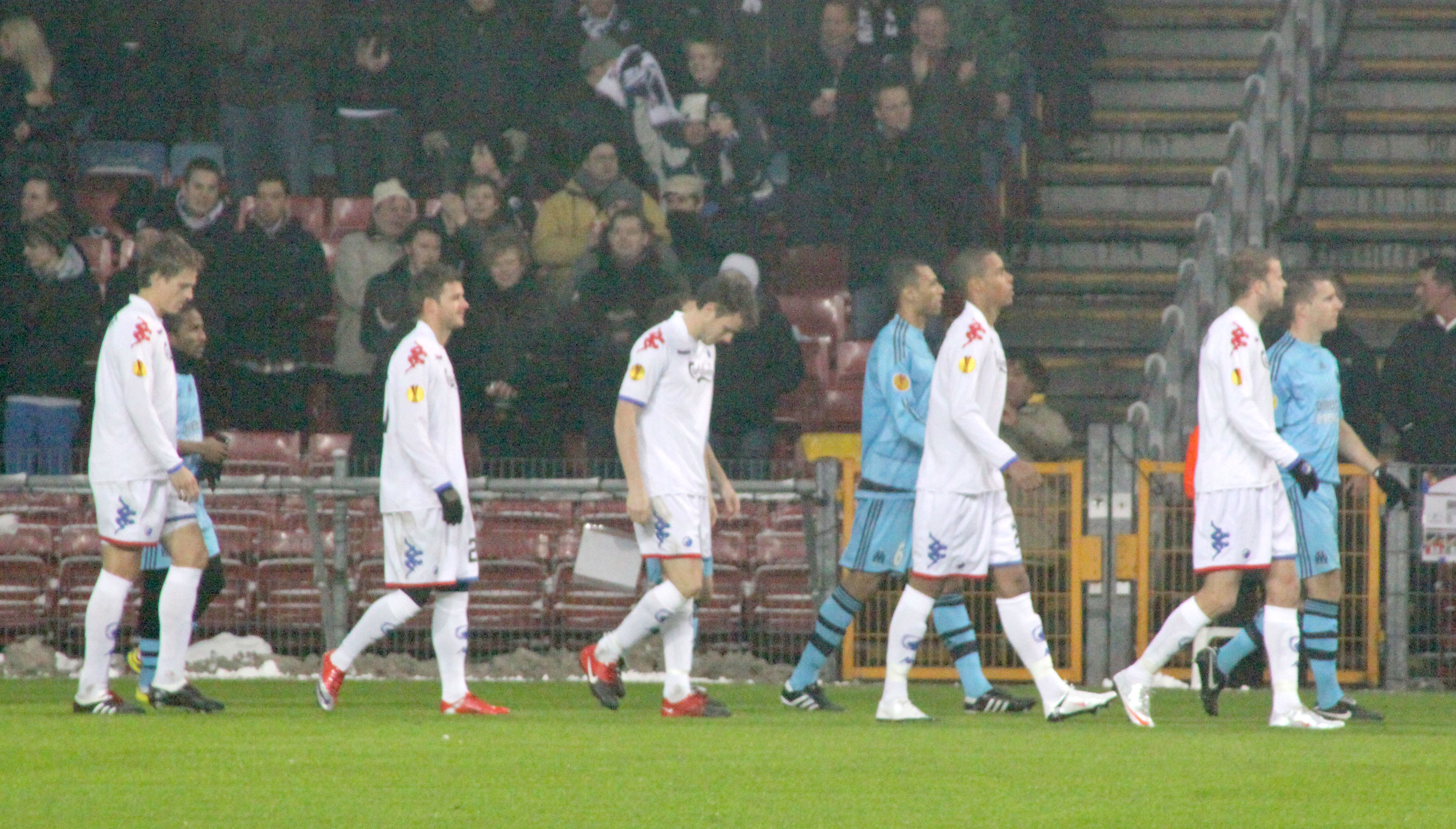
The sky blue of Marseille enter the field away at Copenhagen in the UEFA Europa League, 2010

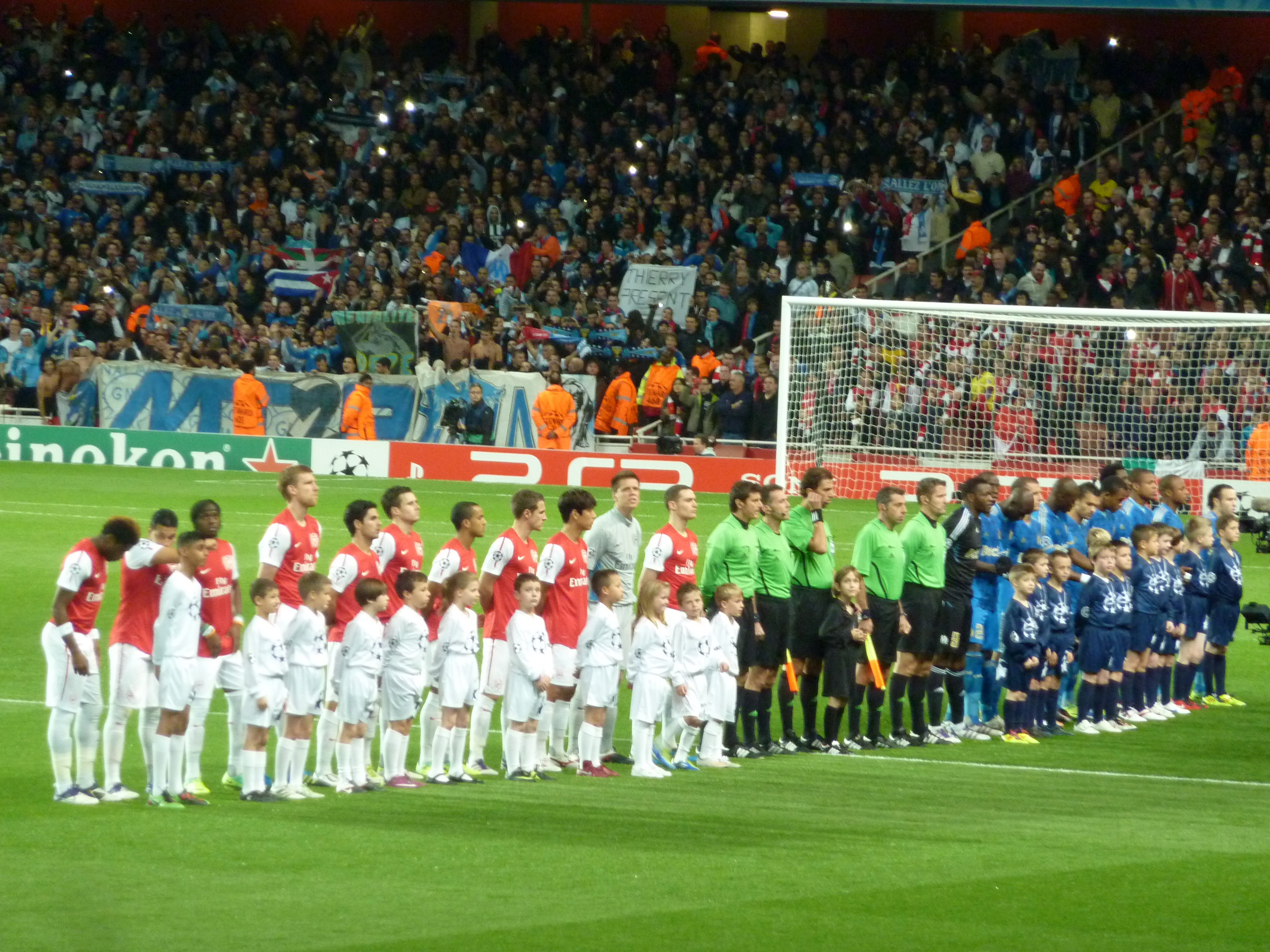
OM face Arsenal in 2011

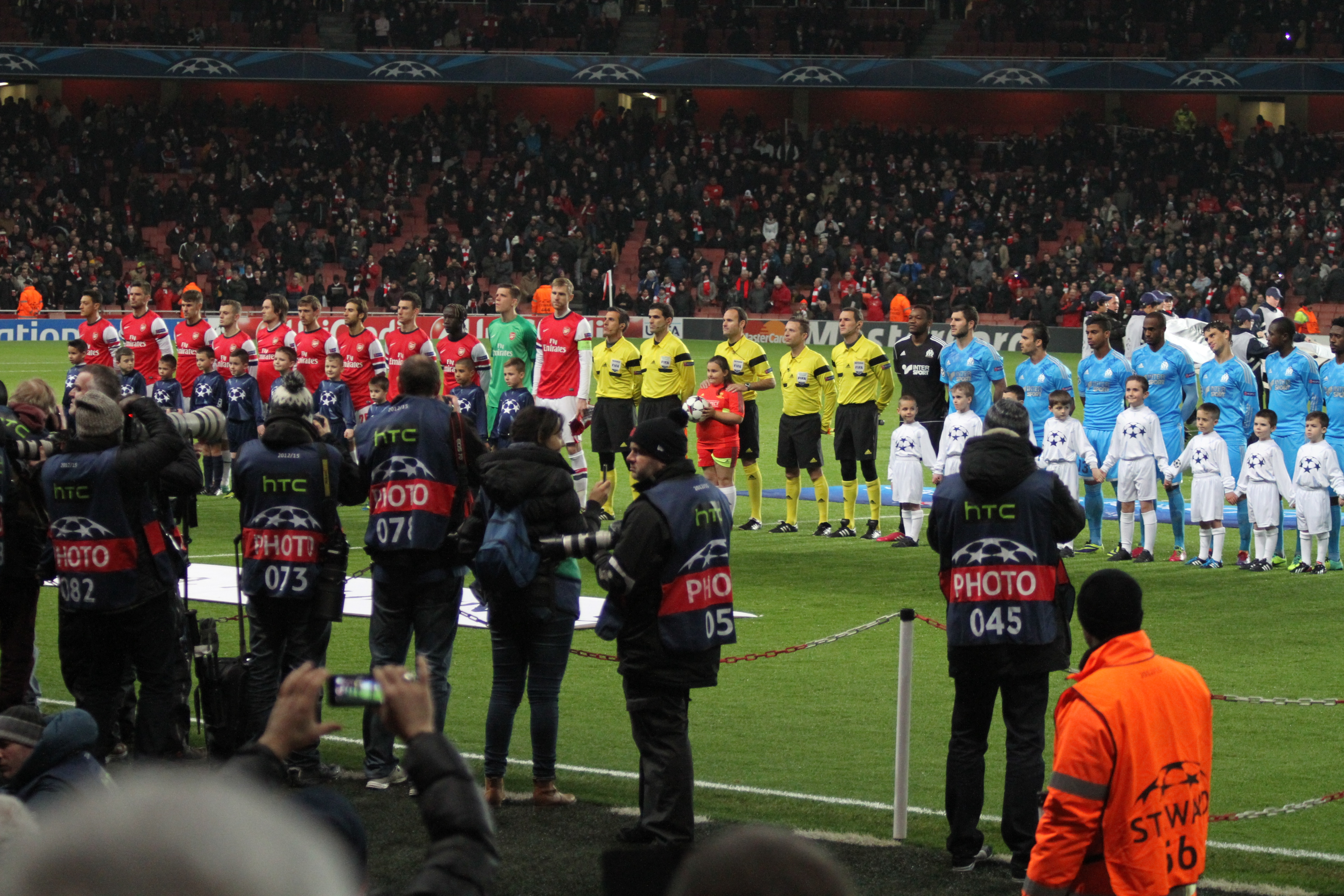
Two years on, the Gunners and les Olympiens renew Champions League acquaintances

Season	Competition	Round	Country	Opponent	Score
1962–63	Inter-Cities Fairs Cup	First Round	BEL	Union Saint-Gilloise	1–0 (H), 2–4 (A)
1968–69	Inter-Cities Fairs Cup	First Round	TUR	Göztepe	0–2 (H), 2–0 (A)
1969	Intertoto Cup	Group 1	SWE	Malmö FF	1–1 (H), 0–1 (A)
1969	Intertoto Cup	Group 1	SUI	Servette	0–0 (A), 1–1 (H)
1969	Intertoto Cup	Group 1	FRG	1. FC Kaiserslautern	0–6 (A), 1–0 (H)
1969–70	Cup Winners' Cup	First Round	TCH	Dukla Prague	0–1 (A), 2–0 (H)
1969–70	Cup Winners' Cup	Second Round	YUG	Dinamo Zagreb	1–1 (H), 0–2 (A)
1970	Intertoto Cup	Group B3	SWE	AIK	2–2 (A), 6–2 (H)
1970	Intertoto Cup	Group B3	TCH	Zagłębie Sosnowiec	3–1 (H), 2–3 (A)
1970	Intertoto Cup	Group B3	SUI	Lausanne-Sport	4–0 (H), 0–0 (A)
1970–71	Inter-Cities Fairs Cup	First Round	TCH	Spartak Trnava	0–2 (A), 2–0 (H)
1971–72	European Cup	First Round	POL	Górnik Zabrze	2–1 (H), 1–1 (A)
1971–72	European Cup	Second Round	NED	Ajax	1–2 (H), 1–4 (A)
1972–73	European Cup	First Round	ITA	Juventus	1–0 (A), 0–3 (H)
1973–74	UEFA Cup	First Round	LUX	Union Luxembourg	5–0 (A), 7–1 (H)
1973–74	UEFA Cup	Second Round	FRG	1. FC Köln	2–0 (H), 0–6 (A)
1975–76	UEFA Cup	First Round	GDR	Carl Zeiss Jena	0–3 (A), 0–1 (H)
1976–77	Cup Winners' Cup	First Round	ENG	Southampton	0–4 (A), 2–1 (H)
1987–88	Cup Winners' Cup	First Round	GDR	Lokomotive Leipzig	0–0 (A), 1–0 (H)
1987–88	Cup Winners' Cup	Second Round	YUG	Hajduk Split	4–0 (H), 3–0 (A) ^{1}
1987–88	Cup Winners' Cup	Quarter-final	FIN	RoPS	1–0 (A), 3–0 (H)
1987–88	Cup Winners' Cup	Semi-final	NED	Ajax	0–3 (H), 2–1 (A)
1989–90	European Cup	First Round	DEN	Brøndby	3–0 (H), 1–1 (A)
1989–90	European Cup	Second Round	GRE	AEK Athens	2–0 (H), 1–1 (A)
1989–90	European Cup	Quarter-final	BUL	CSKA Sofia	1–0 (A), 3–1 (H)
1989–90	European Cup	Semi-final	POR	Benfica	2–1 (H), 0–1 (A)
1990–91	European Cup	First Round	ALB	Dinamo Tirana	5–1 (H), 0–0 (A)
1990–91	European Cup	Second Round	POL	Lech Poznań	2–3 (A), 6–1 (H)
1990–91	European Cup	Quarter-final	ITA	Milan	1–1 (A), 3–0 (H)
1990–91	European Cup	Semi-final	URS	Spartak Moscow	3–1 (A), 2–1 (H)
1990–91	European Cup	Final	YUG	Red Star Belgrade	0–0 (N)
1991–92	European Cup	First Round	LUX	Union Luxembourg	5–0 (H), 5–0 (A)
1991–92	European Cup	Second Round	TCH	Sparta Prague	3–2 (H), 1–2 (A)
1992–93	Champions League	First Round	NIR	Glentoran	5–0 (A), 3–0 (H)
1992–93	Champions League	Second Round	ROM	Dinamo București	0–0 (A), 2–0 (H)
1992–93	Champions League	Group 1	SCO	Rangers	2–2 (A), 1–1 (H)
1992–93	Champions League	Group 1	BEL	Club Brugge	3–0 (H), 1–0 (A)
1992–93	Champions League	Group 1	RUS	CSKA Moscow	1–1 (A), 6–0 (H)
1992–93	Champions League	Final	ITA	Milan	1–0 (N)
1994–95	UEFA Cup	First Round	GRE	Olympiacos	2–1 (A), 3–0 (H)
1994–95	UEFA Cup	Second Round	SUI	Sion	0–2 (A), 3–1 (H)
1998–99	UEFA Cup	First Round	CZE	Sigma Olomouc	2–2 (A), 4–0 (H)
1998–99	UEFA Cup	Second Round	GER	Werder Bremen	1–1 (A), 3–2 (H)
1998–99	UEFA Cup	Third Round	FRA	Monaco	2–2 (A), 1–0 (H)
1998–99	UEFA Cup	Quarter-final	ESP	Celta Vigo	2–1 (H), 0–0 (A)
1998–99	UEFA Cup	Semi-final	ITA	Bologna	0–0 (H), 1–1 (A)
1998–99	UEFA Cup	Final	ITA	Parma	0–3 (N)
1999–2000	Champions League	Group D	AUT	Sturm Graz	2–0 (H), 2–3 (A)
1999–2000	Champions League	Group D	CRO	Croatia Zagreb	2–1 (A), 2–2 (H)
1999–2000	Champions League	Group D	ENG	Manchester United	1–2 (A), 1–0 (H)
1999–2000	Champions League	Group D	ITA	Lazio	0–2 (H), 1–5 (A)
1999–2000	Champions League	Group D	NED	Feyenoord	0–3 (A), 0–0 (H)
1999–2000	Champions League	Group D	ENG	Chelsea	1–0 (H), 0–1 (A)
2003–04	Champions League	Third Qualifying Round	AUT	Austria Wien	1–0 (A), 0–0 (H)
2003–04	Champions League	Group F	ESP	Real Madrid	2–4 (A), 1–2 (H)
2003–04	Champions League	Group F	SCG	Partizan	3–0 (H), 1–1 (A)
2003–04	Champions League	Group F	POR	Porto	2–3 (H), 0–1 (A)
2003–04	UEFA Cup	Third Round	UKR	Dnipro	1–0 (H), 0–0 (A)
2003–04	UEFA Cup	Fourth Round	ENG	Liverpool	1–1 (A), 2–1 (H)
2003–04	UEFA Cup	Quarter-final	ITA	Inter Milan	1–0 (H), 1–0 (A)
2003–04	UEFA Cup	Semi-final	ENG	Newcastle United	0–0 (A), 2–0 (H)
2003–04	UEFA Cup	Final	ESP	Valencia	0–2 (N)
2005	Intertoto Cup	Third Round	SUI	Young Boys	3–2 (A), 2–1 (H)
2005	Intertoto Cup	Semi-final	ITA	Lazio	1–1 (A), 3–0 (H)
2005	Intertoto Cup	Final	ESP	Deportivo La Coruña	0–2 (A), 5–1 (H)
2005–06	UEFA Cup	First Round	BEL	Germinal Beerschot	0–0 (A), 0–0 (H)
2005–06	UEFA Cup	Group F	RUS	CSKA Moscow	2–1 (A)
2005–06	UEFA Cup	Group F	NED	SC Heerenveen	1–0 (H)
2005–06	UEFA Cup	Group F	BUL	Levski Sofia	0–1 (A)
2005–06	UEFA Cup	Group F	ROM	Dinamo București	2–1 (H)
2005–06	UEFA Cup	Round of 32	ENG	Bolton Wanderers	0–0 (A), 2–1 (H)
2005–06	UEFA Cup	Round of 16	RUS	Zenit Saint Petersburg	0–1 (H), 1–1 (A)
2006	Intertoto Cup	Third Round	UKR	Dnipro	0–0 (H), 2–2 (A)
2006–07	UEFA Cup	Second Qualifying Round	SUI	Young Boys	3–3 (A), 0–0 (H)
2006–07	UEFA Cup	First Round	CZE	Mladá Boleslav	1–0 (H), 2–4 (A)
2007–08	Champions League	Group A	TUR	Beşiktaş	2–0 (H), 1–2 (A)
2007–08	Champions League	Group A	ENG	Liverpool	1–0 (A), 0–4 (H)
2007–08	Champions League	Group A	POR	Porto	1–1 (H), 1–2 (A)
2007–08	UEFA Cup	Round of 32	RUS	Spartak Moscow	3–0 (H), 0–2 (A)
2007–08	UEFA Cup	Round of 16	RUS	Zenit Saint Petersburg	3–1 (H), 0–2 (A)
2008–09	Champions League	Third Qualifying Round	NOR	Brann	1–0 (A), 2–1 (H)
2008–09	Champions League	Group D	ENG	Liverpool	1–2 (H), 0–1 (A)
2008–09	Champions League	Group D	NED	PSV Eindhoven	0–2 (A), 3–0 (H)
2008–09	Champions League	Group D	ESP	Atlético Madrid	1–2 (A), 0–0 (H)
2008–09	UEFA Cup	Round of 32	NED	Twente	0–1 (H), 1–0 (A)
2008–09	UEFA Cup	Round of 16	NED	Ajax	2–1 (H), 2–2 (A)
2008–09	UEFA Cup	Quarter-final	UKR	Shakhtar Donetsk	0–2 (A), 1–2 (H)
2009–10	Champions League	Group C	ITA	Milan	1–2 (H), 1–1 (A)
2009–10	Champions League	Group C	ESP	Real Madrid	0–3 (A), 1–3 (H)
2009–10	Champions League	Group C	SUI	Zürich	1–0 (A), 6–1 (H)
2009–10	Europa League	Round of 32	DEN	Copenhagen	3–1 (A), 3–1 (H)
2009–10	Europa League	Round of 16	POR	Benfica	1–1 (A), 1–2 (H)
2010–11	Champions League	Group C	RUS	Spartak Moscow	0–1 (H), 3–0 (A)
2010–11	Champions League	Group C	ENG	Chelsea	0–2 (A), 1–0 (H)
2010–11	Champions League	Group C	SVK	Žilina	1–0 (H), 7–0 (A)
2010–11	Champions League	Round of 16	ENG	Manchester United	0–0 (H), 1–2 (A)
2011–12	Champions League	Group F	GRE	Olympiacos	1–0 (A), 0–1 (H)
2011–12	Champions League	Group F	GER	Borussia Dortmund	3–0 (H), 3–2 (A)
2011–12	Champions League	Group F	ENG	Arsenal	0–1 (H), 0–0 (A)
2011–12	Champions League	Round of 16	ITA	Inter Milan	1–0 (H), 1–2 (A)
2011–12	Champions League	Quarter-final	GER	Bayern Munich	0–2 (H), 0–2 (A)
2012–13	Europa League	Third Qualifying Round	TUR	Eskişehirspor	1–1 (A), 3–0 (H)
2012–13	Europa League	Play-off	MDA	Sheriff Tiraspol	2–1 (A), 0–0 (H)
2012–13	Europa League	Group C	TUR	Fenerbahçe	2–2 (A), 0–1 (H)
2012–13	Europa League	Group C	CYP	AEL Limassol	5–1 (H), 0–3 (A)
2012–13	Europa League	Group C	GER	Borussia Mönchengladbach	0–2 (A), 2–2 (H)
2013–14	Champions League	Group F	ENG	Arsenal	1–2 (H), 0–2 (A)
2013–14	Champions League	Group F	GER	Borussia Dortmund	0–3 (A), 1–2 (H)
2013–14	Champions League	Group F	ITA	Napoli	1–2 (H), 2–3 (A)
2015–16	Europa League	Group F	NED	Groningen	3–0 (A), 2–1 (H)
2015–16	Europa League	Group F	CZE	Slovan Liberec	0–1 (H), 4–2 (A)
2015–16	Europa League	Group F	POR	Braga	2–3 (A), 1–0 (H)
2015–16	Europa League	Round of 32	ESP	Athletic Bilbao	0–1 (H), 1–1 (A)
2017–18	Europa League	Third Qualifying Round	BEL	Oostende	4–2 (H), 0–0 (A)
2017–18	Europa League	Play-off Round	SLO	Domžale	1–1 (A), 3–0 (H)
2017–18	Europa League	Group I	TUR	Konyaspor	1–0 (H), 1–1 (A)
2017–18	Europa League	Group I	AUT	Red Bull Salzburg	0–1 (A), 0–0 (H)
2017–18	Europa League	Group I	POR	Vitória de Guimarães	2–1 (H), 0–1 (A)
2017–18	Europa League	Round of 32	POR	Braga	3–0 (H), 0–1 (A)
2017–18	Europa League	Round of 16	ESP	Athletic Bilbao	3–1 (H), 2–1 (A)
2017–18	Europa League	Quarter-final	GER	RB Leipzig	0–1 (A), 5–2 (H)
2017–18	Europa League	Semi-final	AUT	Red Bull Salzburg	2–0 (H), 1–2 (A)
2017–18	Europa League	Final	ESP	Atlético Madrid	0–3 (N)
2018–19	Europa League	Group H	GER	Eintracht Frankfurt	1–2 (H), 0–4 (A)
2018–19	Europa League	Group H	CYP	Apollon Limassol	2–2 (A), 1–3 (H)
2018–19	Europa League	Group H	ITA	Lazio	1–3 (H), 1–2 (A)
2020–21	Champions League	Group C	POR	Porto	0–3 (A), 0–2 (H)
2020–21	Champions League	Group C	ENG	Manchester City	0–3 (H), 0–3 (A)
2020–21	Champions League	Group C	GRE	Olympiacos	0–1 (A), 2–1 (H)
2021–22	Europa League	Group E	ITA	Lazio	0–0 (A), 2–2 (H)
2021–22	Europa League	Group E	RUS	Lokomotiv Moscow	1–1 (A), 1–0 (H)
2021–22	Europa League	Group E	TUR	Galatasaray	0–0 (H), 2–4 (A)
2021–22	Europa Conference League	Knockout round play-off	AZE	Qarabağ	3–1 (H), 3–0 (A)
2021–22	Europa Conference League	Round of 16	SUI	Basel	2–1 (H), 2–1 (A)
2021–22	Europa Conference League	Quarter-final	GRE	PAOK	2–1 (H), 1–0 (A)
2021–22	Europa Conference League	Semi-final	NED	Feyenoord	2–3 (A), 0–0 (H)
2022–23	Champions League	Group D	ENG	Tottenham Hotspur	0–2 (A), 1–2 (H)
2022–23	Champions League	Group D	GER	Eintracht Frankfurt	0–1 (H), 1–2 (A)
2022–23	Champions League	Group D	POR	Sporting CP	4–1 (H), 2–0 (A)
2023–24	Champions League	Third qualifying round	GRE	Panathinaikos	0–1 (A), 2−1 (H)
2023–24	Europa League	Group B	NED	Ajax	3–3 (A), 4–3 (H)
2023–24	Europa League	Group B	ENG	Brighton & Hove Albion	2–2 (H), 0–1 (A)
2023–24	Europa League	Group B	GRE	AEK Athens	3–1 (H), 2–0 (A)
2023–24	Europa League	Knockout play-off	UKR	Shakhtar Donetsk	2–2 (A), 3–1 (H)
2023–24	Europa League	Round of 16	ESP	Villarreal	4–0 (H), 1–3 (A)
2023–24	Europa League	Quarter-final	POR	Benfica	1–2 (A), 1–0 (H)
2023–24	Europa League	Semi-final	ITA	Atalanta	1–1 (H), 0–3 (A)
2025–26	Champions League	League phase	ESP	Real Madrid	1–2 (A)
2025–26	Champions League	League phase	NED	Ajax	4–0 (H)
2025–26	Champions League	League phase	POR	Sporting CP	1–2 (A)
2025–26	Champions League	League phase	ITA	Atalanta	0–1 (H)
2025–26	Champions League	League phase	ENG	Newcastle United	2–1 (H)
2025–26	Champions League	League phase	BEL	Union Saint-Gilloise	3–2 (A)
2025–26	Champions League	League phase	ENG	Liverpool	0–3 (H)
2025–26	Champions League	League phase	BEL	Club Brugge	0–3 (A)
2026–27	Europa League	League phase	TUR	Beşiktaş	1–4 (A)
2026–27	Europa League	League phase	GRE	Olympiacos	
2026–27	Europa League	League phase	AUT	Sturm Graz	
2026–27	Europa League	League phase	GER	Bayer Leverkusen	
2026–27	Europa League	League phase	BUL	Levski Sofia	
2026–27	Europa League	League phase	ESP	Celta Vigo	
2026–27	Europa League	League phase	SCO	Celtic	
2026–27	Europa League	League phase	BEL	Anderlecht	

- Note 1: With Hajduk Split winning 2–0, the match was interrupted for 15 minutes due to tear gas being thrown onto the stands. The match was voided and awarded 3–0 to Marseille due to the crowd trouble.

== Finals ==
Year	Competition	Opposing Team	Score	Venue
1991	European Cup	(Socialist Federal Republic of Yugoslavia) Red Star Belgrade	0–0 a.p. (3–5 p)	(Italy) Stadio San Nicola, Bari
1993	Champions League	(Italy) Milan	1–0	(Germany) Olympiastadion, Munich
1999	UEFA Cup	(Italy) Parma	0–3	(Russia) Luzhniki Stadium, Moscow
2004	UEFA Cup	(Spain) Valencia	0–2	(Sweden) Ullevi, Gothenburg
2005	Intertoto Cup	(Spain) Deportivo de La Coruña	5–3 on aggregate	Two-legged
2018	Europa League	(Spain) Atlético Madrid	0–3	(France) Parc Olympique Lyonnais, Lyon

=== Semi-finals ===
Year	Competition	Opposing Team	Score	Where the Final was	Other Semi-finalists
1988	European Cup Winners' Cup	(Netherlands) Ajax	2–4	(France) Stade de la Meinau	(Belgium) Mechelen (Italy) Atalanta
1990	European Cup	(Portugal) Benfica	2–2* (a)	(Austria) Praterstadion	(West Germany) Bayern Munich (Italy) Milan
2022	Europa Conference League	(Netherlands) Feyenoord	2–3 on aggregate	(Albania) Arena Kombëtare	(Italy) Roma (England) Leicester City
2024	Europa League	(Italy) Atalanta	1–4 on aggregate	(Republic of Ireland) Aviva Stadium	(Germany) Bayer Leverkusen (Italy) Roma
