= François Lemasson =

French footballer (born 1963)

Personal information
- Date of birth: 15 November 1963 (age 62)
- Place of birth: Limoges, France
- Height: 1.80 m (5 ft 11 in)
- Position: Goalkeeper

Youth career
- 1978–1979: ASPTT Limoges
- 1979–1983: Paris Saint-Germain

Senior career*
Years	Team	Apps	(Gls)
1983–1984	Paris Saint-Germain	0	(0)
1984–1986	→ Red Star Saint-Ouen (loan)	68	(0)
1986–1987	Saint-Étienne	5	(0)
1987–1990	Lyon	102	(0)
1990–1991	Caen	37	(0)
1991–1992	Montpellier		
1992–1997	Cannes	155	(0)
1997–1999	Marseille	5	(0)
2000–2001	Cannes	16	(0)
- * Club domestic league appearances and goals

François Lemasson (born 15 November 1963) is a French former professional footballer who played as a goalkeeper.

He was the goaltender for the Olympique de Marseille team that reached the 1999 UEFA Cup Final. However, he remained on the bench as they lost 3–0 to Parma.
