= Jocelyn Gourvennec =

French football manager (born 1972)

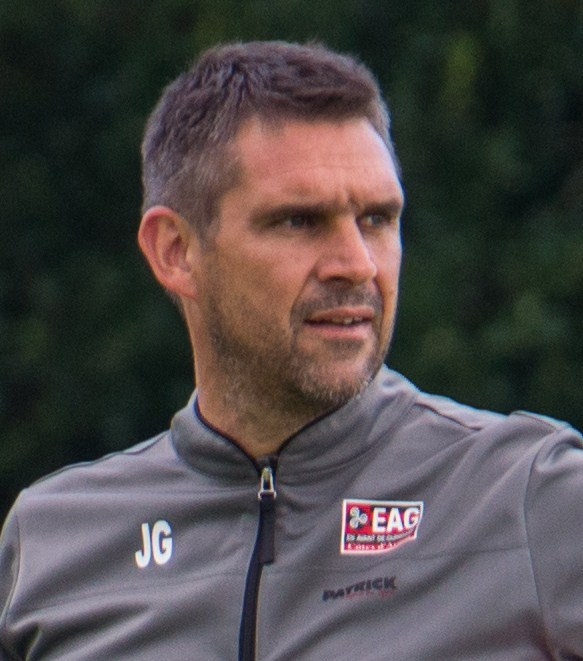
- Gourvennec in 2014

Personal information
- Full name: Jocelyn François Gourvennec
- Date of birth: 22 March 1972 (age 54)
- Place of birth: Brest, Finistère, France
- Height: 1.83 m (6 ft 0 in)
- Position: Midfielder

Team information
- Current team: Servette (manager)

Youth career
- 1980–1987: Lorient

Senior career*
| Years | Team | Apps | (Gls) |
| 1987–1991 | Lorient | 49 | (12) |
| 1991–1995 | Rennes | 109 | (35) |
| 1995–1998 | Nantes | 89 | (24) |
| 1998–1999 | Marseille | 23 | (5) |
| 1999 | Montpellier | 7 | (0) |
| 2000–2002 | Rennes | 52 | (3) |
| 2002–2004 | Bastia | 60 | (3) |
| 2004–2005 | Angers | 17 | (5) |
| 2005–2006 | Clermont | 29 | (1) |
| 2006–2007 | Rezé | 0 | (0) |
| Total | | 435 | (88) |

International career
| 1992–1994 | France U21 | 5 | (0) |
| 1993–1996 | France B | 3 | (0) |

Managerial career
- 2008–2010: La Roche
- 2010–2016: Guingamp
- 2016–2018: Bordeaux
- 2018–2019: Guingamp
- 2021–2022: Lille
- 2023–2024: Nantes
- 2025–: Servette
- * Club domestic league appearances and goals

Jocelyn François Gourvennec (born 22 March 1972) is a French professional football manager and former player who is the current head coach of Servette FC in the Swiss Super League. He played as a midfielder for clubs such as Lorient, Rennes, Nantes, Marseille, Montpellier, Bastia, Angers and Clermont.

== Early life ==
Jocelyn François Gourvennec was born on 22 March 1972 in Brest, Finistère.

== Club career ==
Gourvennec started his professional footballing career with Rennes and during his time at the club he won the Division 2 Player of the Year award of 1993. He later moved to Marseille, where he played in the 1999 UEFA Cup Final, winning a runners-up medal with the Olympians after losing 3–0 against Parma.

== Managerial career ==
Following the end of his playing career, Gourvennec got into management, being named as Guingamp's manager in May 2010. On 3 May 2014, he led Guingamp to success in the Coupe de France for only their second time by beating his old club Rennes. In May 2016, Gourvennec took up the helm of Ligue 1 team Bordeaux.

On 8 November 2018, Gourvennec returned to Guingamp as their new manager after sacking Antoine Kombouaré. On 22 May 2019, the club announced that he had left the club by mutual agreement, after Gourvenenc was unable to guide the team to safety and the season ended with relegation to Ligue 2 for the first time since the 2003–04 season.

On 5 July 2021, he became the new manager of a Lille side fresh off winning the 2020–21 Ligue 1 title, following the departure of previous manager Christophe Galtier for Nice. On 1 August 2021, he won his first trophy with the club after defeating PSG 1–0 in the 2021 Trophée des Champions.

On 29 November 2023, Gourvennec was named manager of Nantes until the end of the season. He was dismissed on 18 March 2024, and replaced by Antoine Kombouaré.

On 11 August 2025, he was named the head coach of Servette FC in the Swiss Super League.

== Managerial statistics ==
As of 21 November 2026

Managerial record by team and tenure
| Team | From | To | Record | | | | | | | | Ref. |
| Team | From | To | P | W | D | L | GF | GA | GD | Win % | Ref. |
|---|---|---|---|---|---|---|---|---|---|---|---|
| La Roche | 1 July 2008 | 17 May 2010 | 53 | 25 | 12 | 16 | 79 | 49 | +30 | 47.17 | |
| Guingamp | 17 May 2010 | 27 May 2016 | 275 | 123 | 58 | 94 | 398 | 317 | +81 | 44.73 | |
| Bordeaux | 27 May 2016 | 18 January 2018 | 71 | 28 | 19 | 24 | 94 | 92 | +2 | 39.44 | |
| Guingamp | 12 November 2018 | 24 May 2019 | 32 | 7 | 11 | 14 | 30 | 48 | −18 | 21.88 | |
| Lille | 5 July 2021 | 16 June 2022 | 49 | 19 | 16 | 14 | 62 | 59 | +3 | 38.78 | |
| Nantes | 29 November 2023 | 18 March 2024 | 15 | 4 | 1 | 10 | 11 | 20 | −9 | 26.67 | |
| Servette | 11 August 2025 | present | 56 | 21 | 16 | 19 | 104 | 79 | +25 | 37.50 | |
| Total | | | 551 | 227 | 133 | 191 | 779 | 664 | +115 | 41.20 | |

== Honours ==
=== Managerial ===
Guingamp

- Coupe de France: 2013–14
- Coupe de la Ligue runner-up: 2018–19

Lille

- Trophée des Champions: 2021

Individual

- Ligue 2 Player of the Year: 1993–94
- Ligue 2 Manager of the Year: 2012–13
