= Edson (footballer, born 1977) =

Brazilian footballer

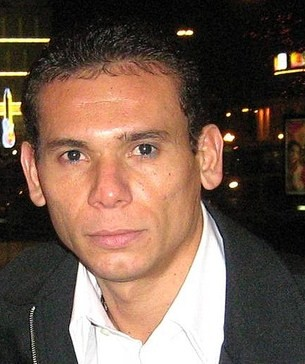
- Edson in 2007

Personal information
- Full name: Edson Luis da Silva
- Date of birth: 15 March 1977 (age 49)
- Place of birth: Palmares, Brazil
- Height: 1.78 m (5 ft 10 in)
- Position: Left-back

Team information
- Current team: Anápolis (head coach)

Youth career
- Sport Recife

Senior career*
Years	Team	Apps	(Gls)
1996–1999	Sport Recife	24	(0)
1997	→ River (loan)		
1999	→ Marseille (loan)	8	(1)
2000–2002	Corinthians	7	(1)
2001	→ Atlético Mineiro (loan)	8	(0)
2002–2005	União Leiria	78	(12)
2005–2006	Sporting CP	1	(0)
2006	→ Legia Warsaw (loan)	10	(3)
2006–2009	Legia Warsaw	45	(7)
2009	Náutico	9	(2)
2009–2010	Korona Kielce	11	(1)
2010	Santa Cruz	6	(1)
2010	Centro Limoeirense		

Managerial career
- 2011: Pesqueira
- 2011–2012: Guarany de Sobral (assistant)
- 2012: Guarany de Sobral (interim)
- 2012–2013: Ypiranga-PE
- 2014: América-PE
- 2014: Chã Grande
- 2016: Santa Quitéria
- 2018–2019: Náutico (assistant)
- 2020: River (assistant)
- 2020: Grêmio Anápolis
- 2021: Vera Cruz
- 2021–2022: Covilhã (assistant)
- 2022: Iporá
- 2022: Santa Helena
- 2023: Grêmio Anápolis
- 2023: Iporá
- 2023: Jataiense
- 2023: Mineiros
- 2024: Iporá
- 2024–2026: Braga U23 (assistant)
- 2026: Náutico U20
- 2026: Sport Recife (assistant)
- 2026: Anápolis (assistant)
- 2027–: Anápolis
- * Club domestic league appearances and goals

Edson Luiz da Silva (born 15 March 1977), known as Edson Miolo or just Edson, is a Brazilian football coach and former player who played as left-back, who could also adapt to play in midfield. He is the current head coach of Anápolis.

== Playing career ==
Edson began his career with Sport Recife. He played in the 1999 UEFA Cup Final during his brief spell at Marseille, and moved to Corinthians in 2000.

In the summer of 2005, Edson signed for Lisbon side Sporting CP, after three seasons with União de Leiria where his side reach the final of the Taça de Portugal and the Supertaça Cândido de Oliveira. In January 2016, after making only one league appearance with the Leões, he was loaned out to Polish side Legia Warsaw where he would help his side win the Ekstraklasa.

After signing a permanent deal with Legia in 2006, Edson quickly made a name for himself in the Ekstraklasa, scoring some impressive goals from free-kicks. However, he was unable to maintain his form and he was eventually dropped in favor of Grzegorz Bronowicki. Edson spent three years in the capital, winning a national title and a Polish Cup. He scored 11 goals and provided 13 assists in 64 appearances for Legia before losing his starting spot in the 2007–08 season.

On 1 August 2009, Edson moved to fellow top tier side side Korona Kielce. On 9 August he made his debut for his new club in a match against Lech Poznań. He played 12 matches and even scored two goals. Shameless, but he wasn't the same Edson. After six months, he returned to Brazil.

== Honours ==
Sport

- Campeonato Pernambucano: 1998, 1999
- Copa Pernambuco: 1998

Marseille

- UEFA Cup runner-up: 1998–99

Corinthians

- FIFA Club World Cup: 2000
- Campeonato Paulista: 2001
- Copa do Brasil: 2002

União de Leiria

- Taça de Portugal runner-up: 2002–03
- Supertaça Cândido de Oliveira runner-up: 2003

Legia Warsaw

- Ekstraklasa: 2005–06
- Polish Cup: 2007–08

Santa Cruz

- Copa Pernambuco: 2010
