= Martial Robin =

French footballer (born 1977)

Personal information
- Date of birth: 27 August 1977 (age 49)
- Place of birth: Marseille, France
- Height: 1.75 m (5 ft 9 in)
- Positions: Midfielder; left-back

Youth career
- 1994–1996: Marseille

Senior career*
Years	Team	Apps	(Gls)
1996–1999	Marseille	9	(0)
1997–1998	→ Martigues (loan)	35	(5)
1999–2006	Ajaccio	204	(8)
2006–2010	Grenoble	113	(0)
2010–2012	Istres	26	(0)
Total		387	(13)
- * Club domestic league appearances and goals

Martial Robin (born 27 August 1977) is a French former professional footballer who played as a midfielder or left-back.

He won Ligue 2 with Ajaccio and was a UEFA Cup runner-up with Marseille.
