= Cédric Mouret =

French footballer (born 1978)

Personal information
- Date of birth: 26 March 1978 (age 48)
- Place of birth: Avignon, France
- Height: 1.71 m (5 ft 7 in)
- Position: Striker

Youth career
- Cannes

Senior career*
Years	Team	Apps	(Gls)
1996–1998	Cannes	31	(0)
1998	→ Marseille (loan)	10	(0)
1998–2001	Marseille	13	(0)
1999–2000	→ Nancy (loan)	08	(2)
2001–2004	Istres	27	(1)
2004–2005	Stade Raphaëlois		
2005–2007	Martigues		
2007–2008	Avignon Foot 84		

International career
1998	France U21	10	(0)
- * Club domestic league appearances and goals

Cédric Mouret (born 26 March 1978) is a French former professional footballer who played as a striker. He made ten appearances for the France U21 national team.
