= Mamadi Souaré =

Guinean footballer and manager

Personal information
- Date of birth: January 10, 1971 (age 55)
- Place of birth: Dabola, Guinea
- Position: Right-back

International career
Years	Team	Apps	(Gls)
1993	Guinea	1	(0)

Managerial career
- 2009–2010: Guinea
- 2015–2016: SAG Siguiri
- 2017–2018: Gangan

Mamadi Souaré (born 10 January 1971), sometimes known as Passarella, is a Guinean professional football manager and former player who played as a right-back. As a player, he played for the Guinea national team, and he managed them from 2009 to 2010.

== Managerial career ==
Souaré briefly managed the Guinea national football team for 8 months from 2009 to 2010. In 2015, he was appointed manager at SAG Siguiri, and he moved to Gangan in 2017.
