= 2000–01 Olympique de Marseille season =

Marseille
2000–01 season
- Chairman: Robert Louis-Dreyfus
- Manager: Javier Clemente; Tomislav Ivić
- Division 1: 15th
- Coupe de France: Round of 32
- Coupe de la Ligue: Round of 32
- Top goalscorer: Djamel Belmadi (8)
- Average home league attendance: 50,785
Home colours	Away colours	Third colours

Olympique de Marseille was once again forced to fight for its top-flight survival following a dire season, in which the club almost went bankrupt, despite the expensive sale of Robert Pires to Arsenal. Former Spain national team coach Javier Clemente was sacked following the poor run of results, and his replacement Tomislav Ivić just saved Marseille from relegation.

== Squad ==
=== Goalkeepers ===
- (France) Cédric Carrasso
- (France) Stéphane Trévisan
- (France) Damien Grégorini

=== Defenders ===
- (France) Patrick Blondeau
- (France) Jérôme Pérez
- (France) Jacques Abardonado
- (South Africa) Pierre Issa
- (France) Zoumana Camara
- (France) Manuel dos Santos
- (France) Lilian Martin
- (Ivory Coast) Abdoulaye Méïté
- (France) Bruno Ngotty
- (France) William Gallas
- (France) Jean-Christophe Marquet

=== Midfielders ===
- (France) Jérôme Leroy
- (France) Sébastien Pérez
- (France) Frédéric Brando
- (Algeria) Djamel Belmadi
- (Algeria) Brahim Hemdani
- (Argentina) Lucas Bernardi
- (Federal Republic of Yugoslavia) Jovan Stanković
- (France) Mickaël Marsiglia
- (France) Karim Dahou
- (Sweden) Klas Ingesson
- (Argentina) Daniel Montenegro
- (Brazil) Adriano
- (Argentina) Pablo Calandria

=== Attackers ===
- (Ivory Coast) Ibrahima Bakayoko
- (Liberia) George Weah
- (France) Florian Maurice
- (Brazil) Marcelinho Paraíba
- (Brazil) Fernandão
- (Mali) Dramane Coulibaly
- (France) Cyrille Pouget
- (France) Cédric Mouret
- (Bosnia and Herzegovina) Alen Škoro

== Competitions ==
=== Division 1 ===
==== League table ====
Pos	Team	Pld	W	D	L	GF	GA	GD	Pts	Qualification or relegation
13	Auxerre	34	11	8	15	31	41	−10	41	
14	Lens	34	9	13	12	37	39	−2	40	
15	Marseille	34	11	7	16	31	40	−9	40	
16	Toulouse (R)	34	9	10	15	34	49	−15	37	Administratively relegated to Championnat National (Note: Toulouse was administratively relegated to Championnat National by the DNCG due to financial difficulties.)
17	Saint-Étienne (R)	34	8	10	16	42	56	−14	34	Relegation to French Division 2

Source: Ligue 1
Rules for classification: 1) points; 2) goal difference; 3) number of goals scored.
(R) Relegated

==== Results summary ====
Overall								Home						Away					
Pld	W	D	L	GF	GA	GD	Pts	W	D	L	GF	GA	GD	W	D	L	GF	GA	GD
34	11	7	16	31	40	−9	40	9	4	4	23	13	+10	2	3	12	8	27	−19

Source: LFP.fr

==== Results by round ====
Round	1	2	3	4	5	6	7	8	9	10	11	12	13	14	15	16	17	18	19	20	21	22	23	24	25	26	27	28	29	30	31	32	33	34
Ground	H	A	H	A	H	A	A	H	A	H	A	H	A	H	A	H	A	H	A	H	A	H	H	A	H	A	H	A	H	A	H	A	H	A
Result	W	L	D	L	W	W	L	L	W	D	L	L	D	L	L	W	L	W	L	W	L	W	D	L	L	D	W	L	D	L	W	L	W	D
Position	1	9	10	13	9	5	10	12	9	8	14	14	14	16	16	16	16	15	15	14	15	13	14	14	15	14	14	14	14	14	14	15	14	15

Source: LFP.fr
A = Away; H = Home; W = Win; D = Draw; L = Loss

==== Matches ====
28 July 2000 1	Marseille	3–1	Troyes	Marseille
18:45	Maurice 9' (pen.); Gallas 45'; Adriano 90'		Boutal 20'	Stadium: Stade Vélodrome; Attendance: 54,039; Referee: Bruno Ruffray

4 August 2000 2	Saint-Étienne	3–0	Marseille	Saint-Etienne
20:45	Sarr 28'; Dias 70', 72'			Stadium: Stade Geoffroy-Guichard; Attendance: 29,275; Referee: Stéphane Bré

13 August 2000 3	Marseille	0–0	Lens	Marseille
20:45				Stadium: Stade Vélodrome; Attendance: 56,806; Referee: Bertrand Layec

19 August 2000 4	Nantes	3–2	Marseille	Nantes
20:00	Olembé 30'; Fabbri 78'; Moldovan 90'		Leroy 23'; Paraíba 63'	Stadium: Stade de la Beaujoire; Attendance: 35,419; Referee: Damien Ledentu

26 August 2000 5	Marseille	3–1	Guingamp	Marseille
20:00	Gallas 23'; Paraíba 60'; Belmadi 85'		Rodriguez 90' (pen.)	Stadium: Stade Vélodrome; Attendance: 51,893; Referee: Hervé Piccirillo

5 September 2000 6	Monaco	0–2	Marseille	Monaco
20:45			Abardonado 76'; Belmadi 88'	Stadium: Stade Louis II; Attendance: 14,538; Referee: Laurent Duhamel

10 September 2000 7	Toulouse	2–0	Marseille	Toulouse
20:30	Petrović 31' (pen.), 35'			Stadium: Stadium de Toulouse; Attendance: 32,103; Referee: Pascal Garibian

16 September 2000 8	Marseille	0–1	Bordeaux	Marseille
20:00			Batlles 62'	Stadium: Stade Vélodrome; Attendance: 51,694; Referee: Alain Sars

23 September 2000 9	Auxerre	0–1	Marseille	Auxerre
17:15			Belmadi 63'	Stadium: Stade de l'Abbé-Deschamps; Attendance: 17,172; Referee: Stéphane Moulin

1 October 2000 10	Marseille	1–1	Lyon	Marseille
20:45	Belmadi 7'		Anderson 52' (pen.)	Stadium: Stade Vélodrome; Attendance: 48,729; Referee: Philippe Kalt

13 October 2000 11	Paris Saint-Germain	2–0	Marseille	Paris
20:45	Robert 62'; Christian 90'			Stadium: Parc des Princes; Attendance: 44,084; Referee: Éric Poulat

22 October 2000 12	Marseille	0–1	Lille	Marseille
20:45			Beck 70'	Stadium: Stade Vélodrome; Attendance: 47,868; Referee: Patrick Lhermite

28 October 2000 13	Strasbourg	1–1	Marseille	Strasbourg
20:45	Luyindula 9'		Weah 54'	Stadium: Stade de la Meinau; Attendance: 22,523; Referee: Bruno Derrien

4 November 2000 14	Marseille	0–1	Rennes	Marseille
20:00			Delaye 35'	Stadium: Stade Vélodrome; Attendance: 49,161; Referee: Pascal Garibian

11 November 2000 15	Sedan	2–0	Marseille	Sedan
20:00	Quint 57' (pen.); Mionnet 70'			Stadium: Stade Louis Dugauguez; Attendance: 16,173; Referee: Alain Sars

17 November 2000 16	Marseille	4–1	Metz	Marseille
20:30	Belmadi 15'; Leroy 45', 63'; Adriano 73'		Meyrieu 20'	Stadium: Stade Vélodrome; Attendance: 45,154; Referee: Thierry Auriac

25 November 2000 17	Bastia	3–0	Marseille	Furiani
17:15	Trévisan 43' (o.g.); Née 53'; André 77'			Stadium: Stade Armand-Cesari; Attendance: 9,217; Referee: Bertrand Layec

29 November 2000 18	Marseille	2–1	Saint-Étienne	Marseille
20:00	Weah 81'; Adriano 88'		Huard 87'	Stadium: Stade Vélodrome; Attendance: 48,798; Referee: Laurent Duhamel

3 December 2000 19	Lens	1–0	Marseille	Lens
20:45	Sibierski 86'			Stadium: Stade Félix-Bollaert; Attendance: 40,152; Referee: Éric Poulat

10 December 2000 20	Marseille	2–0	Nantes	Marseille
17:00	Belmadi 1'; Paraíba 19'			Stadium: Stade Vélodrome; Attendance: 48,605; Referee: Pascal Viléo

16 December 2000 21	Guingamp	1–0	Marseille	Guingamp
17:15	Carnot 37'			Stadium: Stade de Roudourou; Attendance: 16,760; Referee: Pascal Garibian

20 December 2000 22	Marseille	2–1	Monaco	Marseille
20:45	Weah 32', 58'		Simone 15'	Stadium: Stade Vélodrome; Attendance: 50,552; Referee: Stéphane Bré

13 January 2001 23	Marseille	1–1	Toulouse	Marseille
20:00	Belmadi 76'		Dieuze 61'	Stadium: Stade Vélodrome; Attendance: 46,212; Referee: Hervé Piccirillo

26 January 2001 24	Bordeaux	3–0	Marseille	Bordeaux
20:45	Dugarry 24'; Batlles 45', 61'			Stadium: Stade Chaban-Delmas; Attendance: 32,497; Referee: Éric Poulat

3 February 2001 25	Marseille	0–1	Auxerre	Marseille
20:00			Deblock 24'	Stadium: Stade Vélodrome; Attendance: 46,986; Referee: Dominique Fraise

6 February 2001 26	Lyon	1–1	Marseille	Lyon
20:45	Anderson 52' (pen.)		Leroy 76'	Stadium: Stade de Gerland; Attendance: 37,093; Referee: Damien Ledentu

17 February 2001 27	Marseille	1–0	Paris Saint-Germain	Marseille
17:15	Bakayoko 74'			Stadium: Stade Vélodrome; Attendance: 56,315; Referee: Stéphane Bré

3 March 2001 28	Lille	1–0	Marseille	Lille
20:00	Cheyrou 23'			Stadium: Stade Grimonprez-Jooris; Attendance: 19,400; Referee: Bertrand Layec

17 March 2001 29	Marseille	0–0	Strasbourg	Marseille
20:00				Stadium: Stade Vélodrome; Attendance: 49,608; Referee: Stéphane Moulin

7 April 2001 30	Rennes	2–0	Marseille	Rennes
20:00	Le Roux 49', 53'			Stadium: Stade de la Route de Lorient; Attendance: 22,971; Referee: Alain Sars

14 April 2001 31	Marseille	2–1	Sedan	Marseille
20:00	Belmadi 11'; Weah 28'		Quint 6'	Stadium: Stade Vélodrome; Attendance: 54,976; Referee: Damien Ledentu

28 April 2001 32	Metz	1–0	Marseille	Metz
17:15	Espartero 65'			Stadium: Stade Saint-Symphorien; Attendance: 26,320; Referee: Philippe Kalt

12 May 2001 33	Marseille	2–1	Bastia	Marseille
20:00	Bakayoko 35', 74'		Née 51'	Stadium: Stade Vélodrome; Attendance: 55,442; Referee: Bruno Derrien

19 May 2001 34	Troyes	1–1	Marseille	Troyes
20:00	Gousse 33'		Camara 43'	Stadium: Stade de l'Aube; Attendance: 17,756; Referee: Hervé Piccirillo

==== Topscorers ====
- (Algeria) Djamel Belmadi 8
- (Liberia) George Weah 5
- (France) Jérôme Leroy 4
- (France) Ibrahima Bakayoko 3
- (Brazil) Adriano 3

=== Coupe de France ===
20 January 2001 Round of 64	Thaon	0–4	Marseille	Épinal
19:00			Coulibaly 32', 49'; Maurice 67'; Belmadi 87'	Stadium: Stade de la Colombière; Attendance: 8,000; Referee: Bruno Ruffray

10 February 2001 Round of 32	Châteauroux	1–0	Marseille	Châteauroux
20:00	Dufresne 86'			Stadium: Stade Gaston-Petit; Attendance: 15,227; Referee: Laurent Duhamel

=== Coupe de la Ligue ===
6 January 2001 Second round	Le Havre	4–1	Marseille	Le Havre
15:15	Caveglia 10', 81' (pen.); Deniaud 54'; Mazure 76'		dos Santos 58'	Stadium: Stade Jules Deschaseaux; Attendance: 16,372; Referee: Franck Glochon

== Sources ==
- RSSSF - France 2000/01
