= List of Olympique de Marseille seasons =

This page is a season-by-season record of Olympique de Marseille's league and cup performance. For a written history and for a list of honours, see the club's main article.

== Seasons ==
Season	League										Attendance	Coupe de France	Coupe de la Ligue	Europe / Other	
Season	Division	Pos	Pts	Pld	W	D	L	GF	GA	GD	Attendance	Coupe de France	Coupe de la Ligue	Europe / Other	
1903–04	USFSA-litt	Winners	-	-	-	-	-	-	-	-	n.c.	-	-	Championnat de France USFSA	1/2 f
1904–05	USFSA-litt	Winners	-	-	-	-	-	-	-	-	n.c.	-	-	Championnat de France USFSA	1/4 f
1905–06	USFSA-litt	Winners	-	-	-	-	-	-	-	-	n.c.	-	-	Championnat de France USFSA	1/4 f
1906–07	USFSA-litt	Winners	-	-	-	-	-	-	-	-	n.c.	-	-	Championnat de France USFSA	1/2 f
1907–08	USFSA-litt	Winners	-	-	-	-	-	-	-	-	n.c.	-	-	Championnat de France USFSA	1/2 f
1908–09	USFSA-litt	2nd	-	-	-	-	-	-	-	-	n.c.	-	-	-	-
1909–10	USFSA-litt	2nd	-	-	-	-	-	-	-	-	n.c.	-	-	-	-
1910–11	USFSA-litt	2nd	-	-	-	-	-	-	-	-	n.c.	-	-	-	-
1911–12	USFSA-litt	2nd	-	-	-	-	-	-	-	-	n.c.	-	-	-	-
1912–13	USFSA-litt	2nd	-	-	-	-	-	-	-	-	n.c.	-	-	-	-
1913–14	USFSA-litt	2nd	-	-	-	-	-	-	-	-	n.c.	-	-	-	-
1917–18	-	-	-	-	-	-	-	-	-	-	n.c.	1/8 f	-	-	-
1918–19	USFSA-litt	Winners	-	-	-	-	-	-	-	-	n.c.	1/8 f	-	Championnat de France USFSA	Final
1919–20	DH-se	3rd	-	-	-	-	-	-	-	-	n.c.	1/16 f	-	-	-
1920–21	DH-se	2nd	-	-	-	-	-	-	-	-	n.c.	1/32 f	-	-	-
1921–22	DH-se	2nd	-	-	-	-	-	-	-	-	n.c.	1/8 f	-	-	-
1922–23	DH-se	6th	-	-	-	-	-	-	-	-	n.c.	1/8 f	-	-	-
1923–24	DH-se	2nd	-	-	-	-	-	-	-	-	n.c.	Winners	-	-	-
1924–25	DH-se	2nd	-	-	-	-	-	-	-	-	n.c.	1/4 f	-	-	-
1925–26	DH-se	2nd	-	-	-	-	-	-	-	-	n.c.	Winners	-	-	-
1926–27	DH-se	Winners	-	-	-	-	-	-	-	-	n.c.	Winners	-	Division d'Excellence	3rd
1927–28	DH-se	3rd	-	-	-	-	-	-	-	-	n.c.	1/8 f	-	-	-
1928–29	DH-se	Winners	-	-	-	-	-	-	-	-	n.c.	1/16 f	-	Division d'Excellence	Winners
1929–30	DH-se	Winners	-	-	-	-	-	-	-	-	n.c.	1/2 f	-	-	-
1930–31	DH-se	Winners	-	-	-	-	-	-	-	-	n.c.	1/8 f	-	Coupe Peugeot	?
1931–32	DH-se	4th	-	-	-	-	-	-	-	-	n.c.	1/16 f	-	Coupe Peugeot	?
1932–33	D1-A	2nd	23	18	10	3	5	40	24	+16	n.c.	1/32 f	-	-	-
1933–34	D1	3rd	33	26	15	3	8	69	46	+18	n.c.	Final	-	-	-
1934–35	D1	9th	31	30	13	5	12	76	72	+4	n.c.	Winners	-	-	-
1935–36	D1	6th	33	30	14	5	11	61	55	+6	n.c.	1/8 f	-	-	-
1936–37	D1	Winners	38	30	17	4	9	69	39	+30	n.c.	1/16 f	-	-	-
1937–38	D1	2nd	42	30	15	12	3	61	35	+26	n.c.	Winners	-	-	-
1938–39	D1	2nd	40	30	18	4	8	56	34	+22	n.c.	1/16 f	-	-	-
1939–40	D1-se	2nd	11	8	5	1	2	22	12	+10	n.c.	Final	-	-	-
1940–41	D1-Sud	Winners	24	16	10	4	2	44	16	+28	n.c.	1/8 f	-	-	-
1941–42	D1-ZL	5th	15	16	5	5	6	31	25	+6	n.c.	1/8 f	-	-	-
1942–43	D1-Sud	3rd	40	30	16	8	6	100	43	+57	n.c.	Winners	-	-	-
1943–44	-	-	-	-	-	-	-	-	-	-	-	1/16 f	-	Coupe de la Victoire	Final
1944–45	D1-Sud	5th	24	10	11	2	9	58	47	+11	n.c.	1/8 f	-	-	-
1945–46	D1	9th	34	34	12	10	12	70	65	+5	n.c.	1/4 f	-	-	-
1946–47	D1	6th	45	38	17	11	10	69	55	+14	n.c.	1/8 f	-	-	-
1947–48	D1	Winners	48	34	20	8	6	83	43	+40	18 799	1/16 f	-	-	-
1948–49	D1	3rd	42	34	18	6	10	95	58	+37	17 626	1/32 f	-	-	-
1949–50	D1	8th	35	34	13	9	12	56	60	-4	10 129	1/32 f	-	-	-
1950–51	D1	8th	36	34	11	14	9	60	46	+14	15 333	1/8 f	-	-	-
1951–52	D1	16th	27	34	9	9	16	52	76	-24	12 613	1/8 f	-	-	-
1952–53	D1	6th	37	34	15	7	12	62	53	+9	17 569	1/32 f	-	Coupe Charles Drago	First round
1953–54	D1	14th	29	34	10	9	15	49	56	-7	16 792	Final	-	-	-
1954–55	D1	10th	33	34	13	7	14	58	51	+7	20 455	1/32 f	-	Coupe Charles Drago	First round
1955–56	D1	5th	40	34	16	8	10	54	49	+5	17 026	1/8 f	-	Coupe Charles Drago	1/2 f
1956–57	D1	6th	39	34	16	7	11	60	53	+7	16 186	1/16 f	-	Coupe Charles Drago	Winners
1957–58	D1	16th	26	34	8	10	16	46	65	-19	14 730	1/32 f	-	Coupe Charles Drago	First round
1958–59	D1	20th	23	38	6	11	21	50	84	-34	11 232	1/32 f	-	Coupe Charles Drago	First round
1959–60	D2	10th	37	38	16	5	17	57	63	-6	7 534	1/16 f	-	Coupe Charles Drago	Second round
1960–61	D2	6th	41	36	15	11	10	56	42	+14	7 388	1/16 f	-	Coupe Charles Drago	Second round
1961–62	D2	4th	44	36	17	10	9	50	38	+12	10 085	1/4 f	-	Coupe Charles Drago	1/4 f
1962–63	D1	20th	26	38	9	8	21	42	75	-33	12 419	1/8 f	-	Inter-Cities Fairs Cup	First round
1962–63	D1	20th	26	38	9	8	21	42	75	-33	12 419	1/8 f	-	Coupe Charles Drago	Fourth round
1963–64	D2	5th	40	34	15	10	9	59	47	+12	9 006	1/32 f	3rd Gr.6	Coupe Charles Drago	First round
1964–65	D2	14th	21	30	7	7	16	26	38	-12	4 858	Sixth round	1/4 f	Coupe Charles Drago	Third round
1965–66	D2	2nd	48	36	20	8	8	58	31	+27	7 900	1/16 f	-	-	-
1966–67	D1	9th	39	38	13	13	12	44	45	-1	15 244	1/16 f	-	-	-
1967–68	D1	4th	43	38	17	9	12	49	46	+3	11 438	1/32 f	-	-	-
1968–69	D1	7th	33	34	12	9	13	51	48	+3	12 917	Winners	-	Inter-Cities Fairs Cup	First round
1969–70	D1	2nd	45	34	18	9	7	75	41	+34	17 451	1/32 f	-	Intertoto Cup	3rd Gr.1
1969–70	D1	2nd	45	34	18	9	7	75	41	+34	17 451	1/32 f	-	UEFA Cup Winners' Cup	1/8 f
1969–70	D1	2nd	45	34	18	9	7	75	41	+34	17 451	1/32 f	-	Challenge des Champions	Final
1970–71	D1	Winners	55	38	23	9	6	94	48	+46	26 559	1/2 f	-	Intertoto Cup	1st Gr.B3
1970–71	D1	Winners	55	38	23	9	6	94	48	+46	26 559	1/2 f	-	Inter-Cities Fairs Cup	First round
1971–72	D1	Winners	56	38	24	8	6	78	37	+41	22 864	Winners	-	European Cup	Second round
1971–72	D1	Winners	56	38	24	8	6	78	37	+41	22 864	Winners	-	Challenge des Champions	Winners
1972–73	D1	3rd	48	38	19	10	9	64	37	+27	20 681	1/4 f	-	European Cup	First round
1972–73	D1	3rd	48	38	19	10	9	64	37	+27	20 681	1/4 f	-	Challenge des Champions	Final
1973–74	D1	12th	43	38	13	9	16	58	62	-4	14 685	1/32 f	-	UEFA Cup	Second round
1974–75	D1	2nd	49	38	18	9	11	65	45	+20	24 033	1/4 f	-	-	-
1975–76	D1	9th	42	38	20	1	17	60	60	0	17 434	Winners	-	UEFA Cup	First round
1976–77	D1	12th	36	38	14	8	16	48	63	-15	13 292	1/32 f	-	UEFA Cup Winners' Cup	First round
1977–78	D1	4th	47	38	20	7	11	70	41	+29	20 940	1/4 f	-	-	-
1978–79	D1	12th	37	38	12	13	13	50	55	-5	13 152	1/4 f	-	-	-
1979–80	D1	19th	24	38	9	6	23	45	78	-33	13 838	1/32 f	-	-	-
1980–81	D2-A	6th	39	34	16	7	11	40	33	+7	5 906	Sixth round	-	-	-
1981–82	D2-A	3rd	43	34	14	15	5	48	33	+15	13 167	1/8 f	-	-	-
1982–83	D2-B	4th	41	34	16	9	9	38	24	+14	3 591	1/16 f	2nd Gr.4	-	-
1983–84	D2-A	1st	56	36	22	12	2	92	32	+60	15 932	1/32 f	-	-	-
1984–85	D1	17th	31	38	13	5	20	51	67	-16	17 516	1/16 f	1/8 f	-	-
1985–86	D1	12th	34	38	11	12	15	43	39	+4	16 378	Final	-	-	-
1986–87	D1	2nd	49	38	18	13	7	52	33	+19	31 544	Final	1/2 f	-	-
1987–88	D1	6th	41	38	18	5	15	49	43	+6	25 233	1/32 f	-	UEFA Cup Winners' Cup	1/2 f
1988–89	D1	Winners	73	38	20	13	5	56	35	+21	26 530	Winners	-	-	-
1989–90	D1	Winners	53	38	22	9	7	75	34	+39	31 727	1/2 f	-	European Cup	1/2 f
1990–91	D1	Winners	55	38	22	11	5	67	28	+39	31 025	Final	-	European Cup	Final
1991–92	D1	Winners	58	38	23	12	3	67	21	+46	28 995	1/2 f	1/16 f	European Cup	Second round
1992–93	D1	1st	53	38	22	9	7	71	36	+45	27 010	1/4 f	-	UEFA Champions League	Winners
1993–94	D1	2nd	51	38	19	13	6	56	33	+23	25 320	1/4 f	1/32 f	-	-
1994–95	D2	Winners	84	42	25	9	8	72	34	+38	18 794	1/2 f	First round	UEFA Cup	Second round
1995–96	D2	2nd	80	42	23	11	8	69	35	+34	17 960	1/2 f	1/4 f	-	-
1996–97	D1	11th	49	38	12	13	13	43	48	-5	17 862	1/32 f	1/8 f	-	-
1997–98	D1	4th	57	34	16	9	9	47	27	+20	28 257	1/8 f	1/4 f	-	-
1998–99	D1	2nd	71	34	21	8	5	56	28	+28	51 409	1/16 f	1/16 f	UEFA Cup	Final
1999–2000	D1	15th	42	34	9	15	10	45	45	0	51 918	1/16 f	1/16 f	UEFA Champions League	4th Gr2.D
2000–01	D1	15th	40	34	11	7	16	31	40	-9	50 785	1/16 f	1/16 f	-	-
2001–02	D1	9th	44	34	11	11	12	34	39	-5	50 072	1/8 f	1/8 f	-	-
2002–03	D1	3rd	65	38	19	8	11	41	36	+5	48 275	1/16 f	1/2 f	-	-
2003–04	L1	7th	57	38	17	6	15	51	45	+6	51 795	1/16 f	1/8 f	UEFA Champions League	3rd Gr.F
2003–04	L1	7th	57	38	17	6	15	51	45	+6	51 795	1/16 f	1/8 f	UEFA Cup	Final
2004–05	L1	5th	55	38	15	10	13	47	42	+5	52 996	1/32 f	1/16 f	-	-
2005–06	L1	5th	60	38	16	12	10	44	35	+9	49 731	Final	1/16 f	UEFA Intertoto Cup	Winners
2005–06	L1	5th	60	38	16	12	10	44	35	+9	49 731	Final	1/16 f	UEFA Cup	1/8 f
2006–07	L1	2nd	64	38	19	7	12	53	38	+15	48 887	Final	1/8 f	UEFA Intertoto Cup	Third round
2006–07	L1	2nd	64	38	19	7	12	53	38	+15	48 887	Final	1/8 f	UEFA Cup	First round
2007–08	L1	3rd	62	38	17	11	10	58	45	+13	52 600	1/8 f	1/4 f	UEFA Champions League	3rd Gr.A
2007–08	L1	3rd	62	38	17	11	10	58	45	+13	52 600	1/8 f	1/4 f	UEFA Cup	1/8 f
2008–09	L1	2nd	77	38	22	11	5	67	35	+32	52 276	1/16 f	1/16 f	UEFA Champions League	3rd Gr.D
2008–09	L1	2nd	77	38	22	11	5	67	35	+32	52 276	1/16 f	1/16 f	UEFA Cup	1/4 f
2009–10	L1	Winners	78	38	23	9	6	69	36	+33	50 044	1/16 f	Winners	UEFA Champions League	3rd Gr.C
2009–10	L1	Winners	78	38	23	9	6	69	36	+33	50 044	1/16 f	Winners	UEFA Europa League	1/8 f
2010–11	L1	2nd	68	38	18	14	6	62	39	+23	51 081	1/32 f	Winners	Trophée des Champions	Winners
2010–11	L1	2nd	68	38	18	14	6	62	39	+23	51 081	1/32 f	Winners	UEFA Champions League	1/8 f
2011–12	L1	10th	48	38	12	12	14	45	41	+4	42 882	1/4 f	Winners	Trophée des Champions	Winners
2011–12	L1	10th	48	38	12	12	14	45	41	+4	42 882	1/4 f	Winners	UEFA Champions League	1/4 f
2012–13	L1	2nd	71	38	21	8	9	42	36	+6	33 473	1/8 f	1/8 f	UEFA Europa League	3rd Gr.C
2013–14	L1	6th	60	38	16	12	10	53	40	+13	38 129	1/16 f	1/4 f	UEFA Champions League	4th Gr.D
2014–15	L1	4th	69	38	21	6	11	76	42	+34	53 130	1/32 f	1/16 f	-	-
2015–16	L1	13th	48	38	10	18	10	48	42	+6	42 015	Final	1/4 f	UEFA Europa League	1/16 f
2016–17	L1	5th	62	38	17	11	10	57	41	+16	39 894	1/8 f	1/8 f	-	-
2017–18	L1	4th	77	38	22	11	5	80	47	+33	46 040	1/4 f	1/8 f	UEFA Europa League	Final
2018–19	L1	5th	61	38	18	7	13	60	52	+8	50 369	1/32 f	1/8 f	UEFA Europa League	4th Gr.H
2019–20	L1	2nd	56	28	16	8	4	41	29	+12	52 424	1/4 f	1/16 f	-	-
2020–21	L1	5th	60	38	16	12	10	54	47	+7	0	1/16 f	-	Trophée des Champions	Final
2020–21	L1	5th	60	38	16	12	10	54	47	+7	0	1/16 f	-	UEFA Champions League	4th Gr.C
2021–22	L1	2nd	71	38	21	8	9	63	38	+25	51 544	1/4 f	-	UEFA Europa League	3rd Gr.E
2021–22	L1	2nd	71	38	21	8	9	63	38	+25	51 544	1/4 f	-	UEFA Europa Conference League	1/2 f
2022–23	L1	3rd	73	38	22	7	9	67	40	+27	62 571	1/4 f	-	UEFA Champions League	4th Gr.D
2023–24	L1	8th	50	34	13	11	10	52	41	+11	60 799	1/16 f	-	UEFA Champions League	Third qualifying round
2023–24	L1	8th	50	34	13	11	10	52	41	+11	60 799	1/16 f	-	UEFA Europa League	1/2 f
2024–25	L1	2nd	65	34	20	5	9	74	47	+27	63 587	1/16 f	-	-	-
2025–26	L1	5th	59	34	18	5	11	63	45	+18	62 612	1/4 f	-	Trophée des Champions	Final
2025–26	L1	5th	59	34	18	5	11	63	45	+18	62 612	1/4 f	-	UEFA Champions League	League phase

Legend

Winners	Runners-up	Promoted	Relegated

Pos = Final position; Pts = Points; Pld = Matches played; W = Matches won; D = Matches drawn; L = Matches lost; GF = Goals for; GA = Goals against
