= 1997–98 Olympique de Marseille season =

Marseille
1997–98 season
- Chairman: Robert Louis-Dreyfus
- Manager: Rolland Courbis
- Division 1: 4th
- Coupe de France: Round of 16
- Coupe de la Ligue: Quarter-finals
- Top goalscorer: Laurent Blanc (14)
Home colours	Away colours	Third colours

The 1997–98 season was the 92nd season in the history of Olympique de Marseille and the club's second consecutive season in the top flight of French football. In addition to the domestic league, Marseille participated in this season's editions of the Coupe de France and the Coupe de la Ligue.

== Players ==
=== First-team squad ===
Squad at end of season

Note: Flags indicate national team as defined under FIFA eligibility rules; some limited exceptions apply. Players may hold more than one non-FIFA nationality.

No.	Pos.	Nation	Player
—	GK	(Germany) GER	Andreas Köpke
—	DF	(France) FRA	Patrick Colleter
—	DF	(South Africa) RSA	Pierre Issa
—	DF	(France) FRA	Laurent Blanc
—	MF	(France) FRA	Eric Roy
—	MF	(France) FRA	Frédéric Brando
—	FW	(Italy) ITA	Fabrizio Ravanelli
—	FW	(Guinea) GUI	Titi Camara

No.	Pos.	Nation	Player
—	FW	(Ghana) GHA	Arthur Moses
—	DF	(Ivory Coast) CIV	Cyril Domoraud
—	DF	(France) FRA	William Gallas
—	DF	(France) FRA	Hamada Jambay
—	DF	(France) FRA	Jacques Abardonado
—	GK	(France) FRA	François Lemasson
—	DF	(France) FRA	Serge Blanc

=== Left club during season ===
Note: Flags indicate national team as defined under FIFA eligibility rules; some limited exceptions apply. Players may hold more than one non-FIFA nationality.

No.	Pos.	Nation	Player
—	DF	(France) FRA	Martial Robin (on loan to Martigues)

== Competitions ==
Competition	First match	Last match	Starting round	Final position	Record							
Competition	First match	Last match	Starting round	Final position	Pld	W	D	L	GF	GA	GD	Win %
Division 1	2 August 1997	24 May 1998	Matchday 1	4th	34	16	9	9	47	27	+20	47.06
Coupe de France	17 January 1998	28 February 1998	Round of 64	Round of 16	3	2	0	1	4	2	+2	66.67
Coupe de la Ligue	6 January 1998	17 February 1998	Round of 32	Quarter-finals	3	2	0	1	6	3	+3	66.67
Total					40	20	9	11	57	32	+25	50.00

Source: Competitions

=== Division 1 ===
==== League table ====
Pos	Team	Pld	W	D	L	GF	GA	GD	Pts	Qualification or relegation
2	Metz	34	20	8	6	48	28	+20	68	Qualification to Champions League second qualifying round
3	Monaco	34	18	5	11	51	33	+18	59	Qualification to UEFA Cup first round
4	Marseille	34	16	9	9	47	27	+20	57	Qualification to UEFA Cup first round
5	Bordeaux	34	15	11	8	49	41	+8	56	Qualification to UEFA Cup first round
6	Lyon	34	16	5	13	39	37	+2	53	Qualification to UEFA Cup first round

Source: Ligue 1
Rules for classification: 1) points; 2) goal difference; 3) number of goals scored.

==== Results summary ====
Overall								Home						Away					
Pld	W	D	L	GF	GA	GD	Pts	W	D	L	GF	GA	GD	W	D	L	GF	GA	GD
34	16	9	9	47	27	+20	57	11	4	2	25	6	+19	5	5	7	22	21	+1

Source: Division 1

==== Results by round ====
Round	1	2	3	4	5	6	7	8	9	10	11	12	13	14	15	16	17	18	19	20	21	22	23	24	25	26	27	28	29	30	31	32	33	34
Ground	H	H	A	H	A	H	A	H	A	H	A	H	A	H	A	H	A	A	H	A	H	A	H	A	H	A	H	A	H	A	H	A	H	A
Result	W	W	D	L	D	W	L	W	L	W	W	W	D	W	W	W	L	L	D	W	W	L	D	W	W	W	L	L	W	D	D	L	D	D
Position	2	3	3	5	6	4	7	4	8	7	5	4	4	4	3	1	2	4	4	4	4	4	4	3	1	1	1	3	3	3	3	3	3	4

Source: Division 1
A = Away; H = Home; W = Win; D = Draw; L = Loss

==== Matches ====
2 August 1997 1	Marseille	3–1	Le Havre	Marseille
20:00 CEST (UTC+2)	L. Blanc 48' (pen.), 54'; Gravelaine 59'		Horlaville 20'	Stadium: Stade Vélodrome; Attendance: 23,317; Referee: Philippe Kalt

8 August 1997 2	Marseille	1–0	Nantes	Marseille
20:00 CEST (UTC+2)	Landreau 38' (o.g.)			Stadium: Stade Vélodrome; Attendance: 24,570; Referee: Éric Poulat

16 August 1997 3	Montpellier	0–0	Marseille	Montpellier
20:00 CEST (UTC+2)				Stadium: Stade de la Mosson; Attendance: 26,881; Referee: Laurent Duhamel

22 August 1997 4	Marseille	2–3	Lens	Marseille
20:00 CEST (UTC+2)	L. Blanc 5'; Gravelaine 45'		Drobnjak 16' (pen.), 31', 56'	Stadium: Stade Vélodrome; Attendance: 23,753; Referee: Jean-Claude Puyalt

29 August 1997 5	Guingamp	1–1	Marseille	Guingamp
18:30 CEST (UTC+2)	Tasfaout 66'		Mihali 45' (o.g.)	Stadium: Stade de Roudourou; Attendance: 13,428; Referee: Pascal Garibian

4 September 1997 6	Marseille	1–0	Lyon	Marseille
20:30 CEST (UTC+2)	Gravelaine 55'			Stadium: Stade Vélodrome; Attendance: 21,983; Referee: Stéphane Bré

12 September 1997 7	Monaco	2–0	Marseille	Monaco
20:00 CEST (UTC+2)	Collins 76'; Henry 84'			Stadium: Stade Louis II; Attendance: 13,237; Referee: Alain Sars

20 September 1997 8	Marseille	2–0	Châteauroux	Marseille
20:00 CEST (UTC+2)	Moses 25'; Roy 51'			Stadium: Stade Vélodrome; Attendance: 20,080; Referee: Patrick Anton

25 September 1997 9	Bordeaux	2–0	Marseille	Bordeaux
20:30 CEST (UTC+2)	Laslandes 10'; Papin 64'			Stadium: Parc Lescure; Attendance: 27,075; Referee: Éric Poulat

4 October 1997 10	Marseille	2–0	Toulouse	Marseille
20:00 CEST (UTC+2)	L. Blanc 2'; Moses 64'			Stadium: Stade Vélodrome; Attendance: 22,387; Referee: Patrick Lhermite

8 October 1997 11	Rennes	0–2	Marseille	Rennes
20:00 CEST (UTC+2)			Makélélé 44'; Ravanelli 77'	Stadium: Stade de la Route de Lorient; Attendance: 14,972; Referee: Jean-Marc Gonon

16 October 1997 12	Marseille	2–0	Metz	Marseille
20:30 CEST (UTC+2)	L. Blanc 32'; Ravanelli 39'			Stadium: Stade Vélodrome; Attendance: 24,474; Referee: Pascal Garibian

25 October 1997 13	Bastia	1–1	Marseille	Furiani
20:00 CEST (UTC+2)	Šiljak 4'		Camara 54'	Stadium: Stade Armand Cesari; Attendance: 8,317; Referee: Éric Poulat

31 October 1997 14	Marseille	2–0	Cannes	Marseille
20:00 CEST (UTC+2)	L. Blanc 25'; S. Blanc 38'			Stadium: Stade Vélodrome; Attendance: 20,688; Referee: Philippe Kalt

8 November 1997 15	Paris Saint-Germain	1–2	Marseille	Paris
20:30 CET (UTC+1)	J. Leroy 33'		Gravelaine 14'; L. Blanc 65' (pen.)	Stadium: Parc des Princes; Attendance: 43,307; Referee: Jean-Claude Puyalt

15 November 1997 16	Marseille	4–0	Auxerre	Marseille
20:00 CET (UTC+1)	L. Blanc 14'; Makélélé 16'; Asuar 48'; Gravelaine 57'			Stadium: Stade Vélodrome; Attendance: 23,806; Referee: Laurent Duhamel

20 November 1997 17	Strasbourg	2–0	Marseille	Strasbourg
20:30 CET (UTC+1)	Zitelli 68'; Baticle 89' (pen.)			Stadium: Stade de la Meinau; Attendance: 21,105; Referee: Gilles Chéron

29 November 1997 18	Nantes	1–0	Marseille	Nantes
20:00 CET (UTC+1)	Gourvennec 55'			Stadium: Stade de la Beaujoire; Attendance: 32,103; Referee: Serge Léon

7 December 1997 19	Marseille	0–0	Montpellier	Marseille
20:30 CET (UTC+1)				Stadium: Stade Vélodrome; Attendance: 31,368; Referee: Pascal Garibian

13 December 1997 20	Lens	0–1	Marseille	Lens
20:00 CET (UTC+1)			Gravelaine 8'	Stadium: Stade Félix Bollaert; Attendance: 40,121; Referee: Philippe Kalt

10 January 1998 22	Lyon	2–1	Marseille	Lyon
20:00 CET (UTC+1)	Caveglia 60', 82'		L. Blanc 5'	Stadium: Stade de Gerland; Attendance: 29,416; Referee: Pascal Garibian

14 January 1998 21	Marseille	3–0	Guingamp	Marseille
20:00 CET (UTC+1)	Camara 4'; Gravelaine 11'; Ravanelli 27'			Stadium: Stade Vélodrome; Attendance: 24,159; Referee: Bernard Saules

20 January 1998 23	Marseille	1–1	Monaco	Marseille
20:30 CET (UTC+1)	Echouafni 45'		Benarbia 87'	Stadium: Stade Vélodrome; Attendance: 34,424; Referee: Rémi Harrel

24 January 1998 24	Châteauroux	0–3	Marseille	Châteauroux
20:00 CET (UTC+1)			Gravelaine 30'; Ravanelli 49'; L. Blanc 86' (pen.)	Stadium: Stade Gaston Petit; Attendance: 16,528; Referee: Bruno Derrien

4 February 1998 25	Marseille	1–0	Bordeaux	Marseille
20:00 CET (UTC+1)	Gravelaine 42'			Stadium: Stade Vélodrome; Attendance: 32,632; Referee: Éric Poulat

13 February 1998 26	Toulouse	0–4	Marseille	Toulouse
20:00 CET (UTC+1)			Dugarry 23'; Roy 78'; Gravelaine 79'; Ravanelli 84'	Stadium: Stade de Toulouse; Attendance: 36,982; Referee: Jean-Claude Puyalt

21 February 1998 27	Marseille	0–1	Rennes	Marseille
20:00 CET (UTC+1)			Grégoire 60'	Stadium: Stade Vélodrome; Attendance: 26,425; Referee: Gilles Chéron

6 March 1998 28	Metz	3–2	Marseille	Metz
20:30 CET (UTC+1)	Rodriguez 23', 78'; Song 71'		Ravanelli 55'; Brando 76'	Stadium: Stade Saint-Symphorien; Attendance: 18,644; Referee: Stéphane Bré

15 March 1998 29	Marseille	1–0	Bastia	Marseille
20:30 CET (UTC+1)	Ravanelli 88'			Stadium: Stade Vélodrome; Attendance: 32,853; Referee: Laurent Duhamel

29 March 1998 30	Cannes	3–3	Marseille	Cannes
18:30 CET (UTC+1)	Vanenburg 2'; Marsiglia 31'; L. Leroy 82'		L. Blanc 16'; Ravanelli 55'; Domoraud 72'	Stadium: Stade Pierre De Coubertin; Attendance: 11,381; Referee: Rémi Harrel

8 April 1998 31	Marseille	0–0	Paris Saint-Germain	Marseille
20:30 CET (UTC+1)				Stadium: Stade Vélodrome; Attendance: 57,604; Referee: Stéphane Bré

18 April 1998 32	Auxerre	2–1	Marseille	Auxerre
20:00 CET (UTC+1)	Lamouchi 35'; Guivarc'h 68'		Ravanelli 42'	Stadium: Stade de l'Abbé Deschamps; Attendance: 20,258; Referee: Laurent Duhamel

25 April 1998 33	Marseille	0–0	Strasbourg	Marseille
20:30 CET (UTC+1)				Stadium: Stade Vélodrome; Attendance: 35,931; Referee: Bruno Derrien

9 May 1998 34	Le Havre	1–1	Marseille	Le Havre
20:00 CET (UTC+1)	Pouget 30' (pen.)		Moses 8'	Stadium: Stade Jules Deschaseaux; Attendance: 15,955; Referee: Gilles Chéron

=== Coupe de France ===
17 January 1998 Round of 64	FC Sète	0–3	Marseille	Montpellier
15:00 CET (UTC+1)			Gravelaine 34'; Roy 41' (pen.); Brando 83'	Stadium: Stade de la Mosson; Attendance: 12,000; Referee: Laurent Duhamel

7 February 1998 Round of 32	US Boulogne	0–1	Marseille	Boulogne-sur-mer
19:00 CET (UTC+1)			Colleter 71'	Stadium: Stade de la Libération; Attendance: 7,000; Referee: Dominique Fraise

28 February 1998 Round of 16	Monaco	2–0 (a.e.t.)	Marseille	Monaco
17:00 CET (UTC+1)	Ikpeba 101', 119'			Stadium: Stade Louis II; Attendance: 14,000; Referee: Éric Poulat

=== Coupe de la Ligue ===
6 January 1998 Round of 32	Marseille	1–0	Châteauroux	Marseille
21:00 CET (UTC+1)	Bertin 42'			Stadium: Stade Vélodrome; Attendance: 5,224; Referee: Franck Glochon

31 January 1998 Round of 16	Marseille	3–0	Nancy	Marseille
19:30 CET (UTC+1)	Blanc 40' (pen.); Brando 46', 85'			Stadium: Stade Vélodrome; Attendance: 10,623; Referee: Patrick Lhermite

17 February 1998 Quarter-finals	Marseille	2–3	Auxerre	Marseille
21:00 CET (UTC+1)	Makelele 29'; Blanc 80' (pen.)		Guivarc'h 22', 52', 90'	Stadium: Stade Vélodrome; Attendance: 15,000; Referee: Alain Sars
