= 1999–2000 Olympique de Marseille season =

Marseille
1999–2000 season
- Chairman: Robert Louis-Dreyfus
- Manager: Bernard Casoni; Abel Braga; Emon/Galtier
- Division 1: 15th
- Coupe de France: Round of 32
- Coupe de la Ligue: Round of 32
- Champions League: Second group phase
- Top goalscorer: Florian Maurice (8); Ibrahima Bakayoko (8)
Home colours	Away colours	Third colours

Olympique de Marseille nearly crashed out of the French league following a chaotic season, in which all things that could go wrong, indeed went that way. Despite having several internationally respected players in the squad, only goal difference saved the team from being relegated. On the other hand, l'OM was only seven points behind Lens in fifth, suggesting that the league was the tightest ever.

== Squad ==
=== Goalkeepers ===
- (France) Stéphane Porato
- (France) Cédric Carrasso
- (France) Stéphane Trévisan

=== Defenders ===
- (France) William Gallas
- (France) Sébastien Pérez
- (France) Jacques Abardonado
- (South Africa) Pierre Issa
- (Argentina) Eduardo Berizzo
- (France) Loris Reina
- (France) Lilian Martin
- (France) Patrick Blondeau
- (Senegal) Lamine Diatta
- (France) Jean-Pierre Cyprien
- (France) Franck Dumas

=== Midfielders ===
- (Argentina) Daniel Montenegro
- (France) Robert Pires
- (Mali) Seydou Keita
- (Spain) Iván de la Peña
- (France) Frédéric Brando
- (France) Jérôme Leroy
- (France) Peter Luccin
- (Algeria) Djamel Belmadi
- (France) Stéphane Dalmat
- (Ghana) Arthur Moses

=== Attackers ===
- (France) Florian Maurice
- (Guinea) Kaba Diawara
- (Ivory Coast) Ibrahima Bakayoko
- (France) Cyrille Pouget
- (Italy) Fabrizio Ravanelli
- (France) Christophe Dugarry

== Competitions ==
=== Division 1 ===
==== League table ====
Pos	Team	Pld	W	D	L	GF	GA	GD	Pts	Qualification or relegation
13	Rennes	34	12	7	15	44	48	−4	43	
14	Troyes	34	13	4	17	36	52	−16	43	
15	Marseille	34	9	15	10	45	45	0	42	
16	Nancy (R)	34	11	9	14	43	45	−2	42	Relegation to French Division 2
17	Le Havre (R)	34	9	7	18	30	52	−22	34	Relegation to French Division 2

Source: Ligue 1
Rules for classification: 1) points; 2) goal difference; 3) number of goals scored.
(R) Relegated

==== Results summary ====
Overall								Home						Away					
Pld	W	D	L	GF	GA	GD	Pts	W	D	L	GF	GA	GD	W	D	L	GF	GA	GD
34	9	15	10	45	45	0	42	6	7	4	28	19	+9	3	8	6	17	26	−9

Source: LFP.fr

==== Results by round ====
Round	1	2	3	4	5	6	7	8	9	10	11	12	13	14	15	16	17	18	19	20	21	22	23	24	25	26	27	28	29	30	31	32	33	34
Ground	H	A	H	A	H	A	H	A	H	A	H	A	H	A	H	H	A	H	A	H	A	H	A	H	A	H	A	H	A	H	A	A	H	A
Result	W	D	D	D	D	L	W	W	D	W	L	L	W	D	D	L	D	W	L	L	D	D	W	D	L	W	L	L	L	W	D	D	D	D
Position	1	3	7	7	8	11	8	5	6	4	6	7	6	6	7	9	8	7	8	8	9	10	7	6	11	8	13	14	14	12	12	13	13	15

Source: LFP.fr
A = Away; H = Home; W = Win; D = Draw; L = Loss

==== Matches ====
31 July 1999 1	Marseille	3–0	Sedan	Marseille
20:00	Bakayoko 26'; Dugarry 33'; Belmadi 90'			Stadium: Stade Vélodrome; Attendance: 53,511; Referee: Bertrand Layec

5 August 1999 2	Le Havre	0–0	Marseille	Le Havre
20:45				Stadium: Stade Jules Deschaseaux; Attendance: 16,319; Referee: Jean-Claude Puyalt

15 August 1999 3	Marseille	3–3	Saint-Étienne	Marseille
20:45	Ravanelli 7'; Bakayoko 50' (pen.); Maurice 78'		Pédron 38', 62'; Sarr 86'	Stadium: Stade Vélodrome; Attendance: 56,898; Referee: Damien Ledentu

22 August 1999 4	Lens	0–0	Marseille	Lens
20:45				Stadium: Stade Félix-Bollaert; Attendance: 40,355; Referee: Éric Poulat

28 August 1999 5	Marseille	1–1	Bastia	Marseille
20:00	Bakayoko 51'		Née 6'	Stadium: Stade Vélodrome; Attendance: 55,013; Referee: Laurent Duhamel

11 September 1999 6	Montpellier	3–1	Marseille	Montpellier
20:00	Delaye 54', 62'; Ouédec 64'		Dugarry 1'	Stadium: Stade de la Mosson; Attendance: 27,960; Referee: Alain Sars

19 September 1999 7	Marseille	1–0	Troyes	Marseille
18:00	Ravanelli 40'			Stadium: Stade Vélodrome; Attendance: 48,717; Referee: Bruno Ruffray

26 September 1999 8	Rennes	1–2	Marseille	Rennes
20:45	Gava 5'		Ravanelli 35'; Brando 55'	Stadium: Stade de la Route de Lorient; Attendance: 14,978; Referee: Pascal Garibian

2 October 1999 9	Marseille	1–1	Metz	Marseille
20:00	Ravanelli 56'		Padovano 85'	Stadium: Stade Vélodrome; Attendance: 50,554; Referee: Franck Glochon

12 October 1999 10	Paris Saint-Germain	0–2	Marseille	Paris
20:45			Ravanelli 73'; Maurice 81'	Stadium: Parc des Princes; Attendance: 44,784; Referee: Éric Poulat

15 October 1999 11	Marseille	0–1	Lyon	Marseille
20:45			Anderson 36'	Stadium: Stade Vélodrome; Attendance: 52,892; Referee: Jean-Claude Puyalt

23 October 1999 12	Bordeaux	2–1	Marseille	Bordeaux
20:45	Laslandes 23', 87'		de la Peña 21'	Stadium: Stade Chaban-Delmas; Attendance: 32,656; Referee: Pascal Garibian

30 October 1999 13	Marseille	4–1	Strasbourg	Marseille
20:00	Pires 4'; Maurice 20'; Ravanelli 48'; Bakayoko 83'		Garay 90'	Stadium: Stade Vélodrome; Attendance: 50,069; Referee: Damien Ledentu

7 November 1999 14	Monaco	1–1	Marseille	Monaco
20:45	Márquez 30'		Luccin 24'	Stadium: Stade Louis II; Attendance: 14,529; Referee: Stéphane Bré

10 November 1999 15	Marseille	1–1	Nantes	Marseille
19:00	Maurice 17'		Sibierski 37'	Stadium: Stade Vélodrome; Attendance: 49,307; Referee: Stéphane Moulin

20 November 1999 16	Marseille	0–1	Auxerre	Marseille
17:00			Marlet 71'	Stadium: Stade Vélodrome; Attendance: 51,370; Referee: Alain Sars

27 November 1999 17	Nancy	2–2	Marseille	Tomblaine
20:00	Cascarino 51'; Cascarino 75' (pen.)		Maurice 60', 63'	Stadium: Stade Marcel Picot; Attendance: 15,760; Referee: Bruno Derrien

3 December 1999 18	Marseille	2–0	Le Havre	Marseille
20:00	Maurice 55'; Dugarry 56'			Stadium: Stade Vélodrome; Attendance: 47,859; Referee: Philippe Kalt

12 December 1999 19	Saint-Étienne	5–1	Marseille	Saint-Etienne
20:45	Alex Dias 5', 21', 26', 62'; Potillon 17'		Dalmat 90'	Stadium: Stade Geoffroy-Guichard; Attendance: 32,595; Referee: Pascal Garibian

18 December 1999 20	Marseille	1–2	Lens	Marseille
20:00	Montenegro 21'		Sikora 49'; Queudrue 90'	Stadium: Stade Vélodrome; Attendance: 49,009; Referee: Patrick Lhermite

12 January 2000 21	Bastia	0–0	Marseille	Furiani
20:00				Stadium: Stade Armand-Cesari; Attendance: 8,984; Referee: Damien Ledentu

19 January 2000 22	Marseille	0–0	Montpellier	Marseille
18:45				Stadium: Stade Vélodrome; Attendance: 50,565; Referee: Gilles Chéron

25 January 2000 23	Troyes	1–2	Marseille	Troyes
18:45	Monier 43'		Pires 4'; Pouget 60'	Stadium: Stade de l'Aube; Attendance: 16,562; Referee: Stéphane Moulin

2 February 2000 24	Marseille	1–1	Rennes	Marseille
20:00	Pouget 23'		Nonda 87'	Stadium: Stade Vélodrome; Attendance: 48,585; Referee: Bruno Derrien

5 February 2000 25	Metz	2–0	Marseille	Metz
18:45	Boffin 29'; Baticle 86'			Stadium: Stade Saint-Symphorien; Attendance: 25,648; Referee: Laurent Duhamel

15 February 2000 26	Marseille	4–1	Paris Saint-Germain	Marseille
20:45	Pérez 24'; Pouget 59'; Abardonado 67'; Maurice 78'		Christian 7'	Stadium: Stade Vélodrome; Attendance: 54,876; Referee: Éric Poulat

26 February 2000 27	Lyon	2–0	Marseille	Lyon
21:00	Vairelles 28'; Anderson 53'			Stadium: Stade de Gerland; Attendance: 39,758; Referee: Alain Sars

11 March 2000 28	Marseille	0–2	Bordeaux	Marseille
20:00			Dugarry 20'; Laslandes 84'	Stadium: Stade Vélodrome; Attendance: 54,457; Referee: Stéphane Bré

25 March 2000 29	Strasbourg	3–1	Marseille	Strasbourg
20:00	Erhet 62'; Dumas 85' (o.g.); Dorn 90'		Bakayoko 67'	Stadium: Stade de la Meinau; Attendance: 35,946; Referee: Bertrand Layec

7 April 2000 30	Marseille	4–2	Monaco	Marseille
20:45	Pouget 30'; Bakayoko 54', 78'; Blondeau 90'		Trezeguet 61', 70'	Stadium: Stade Vélodrome; Attendance: 55,895; Referee: Alain Sars

15 April 2000 31	Nantes	0–0	Marseille	Nantes
20:00				Stadium: Stade de la Beaujoire; Attendance: 35,853; Referee: Damien Ledentu

30 April 2000 32	Auxerre	2–2	Marseille	Auxerre
20:45	Marlet 18', 71'		Leroy 7'; Abardonado 58'	Stadium: Stade de l'Abbé-Deschamps; Attendance: 20,983; Referee: Pascal Garibian

4 May 2000 33	Marseille	2–2	Nancy	Marseille
20:00	Pouget 31'; Pérez 75'		Wiart 52'; Méniri 84'	Stadium: Stade Vélodrome; Attendance: 49,088; Referee: Stéphane Moulin

13 May 2000 34	Sedan	2–2	Marseille	Sedan
20:00	Verschuère 34'; Di Rocco 90'		Leroy 45'; Bakayoko 70'	Stadium: Stade Émile Albeau; Attendance: 17,006; Referee: Stéphane Bré

==== Topscorers ====
- (France) Florian Maurice 8
- (Ivory Coast) Ibrahima Bakayoko 8
- (Italy) Fabrizio Ravanelli 6
- (France) Cyrille Pouget 5
- (France) Christophe Dugarry 3

=== Coupe de France ===
22 January 2000 Round of 64	ES Segré	0–1	Marseille	Angers
20:00			Pirés 49'	Stadium: Stade Jean-Bouin; Attendance: 17,000; Referee: Michel Bonnichon

12 February 2000 Round of 32	Marseille	3–4	Gueugnon	Marseille
20:00	Maurice 69'; Pouget 76'; Fischer 87'		Traoré 16', 24'; Esceth-N'Zi 59'; Chabert 68'	Stadium: Stade Vélodrome; Attendance: 30,000; Referee: Hervé Piccirillo

=== Coupe de la Ligue ===
9 January 2000 Second round	Bastia	3–0	Marseille	Furiani
20:45	Lachuer 56'; Jurietti 59'; André 71'			Stadium: Stade Armand-Cesari; Attendance: 9,000; Referee: Jean-Claude Puyault

=== UEFA Champions League ===
==== First group stage ====
Pos	Team	Pld	W	D	L	GF	GA	GD	Pts	Qualification
1	(England) Manchester United	6	4	1	1	9	4	+5	13	Advance to second group stage
2	(France) Marseille	6	3	1	2	10	8	+2	10	Advance to second group stage
3	(Austria) Sturm Graz	6	2	0	4	5	12	−7	6	Transfer to UEFA Cup
4	Croatia Zagreb	6	1	2	3	7	7	0	5	

Source: UEFA

14 September 1999 1	Marseille (France)	2–0	(Austria) Sturm Graz	Marseille, France
20:45	Pires 9'; Ravanelli 33'	Report		Stadium: Stade Vélodrome; Attendance: 19,000; Referee: Oğuz Sarvan (Turkey)

22 September 1999 2	Croatia Zagreb	1–2	(France) Marseille	Zagreb, Croatia
20:45	Šokota 64'	Report	Bakayoko 5'; Pérez 77'	Stadium: Stadion Maksimir; Attendance: 21,500; Referee: Stefano Braschi (Italy)

29 September 1999 3	Manchester United (England)	2–1	(France) Marseille	Manchester, England
20:45	Cole 78'; Scholes 82'	Report	Bakayoko 40'	Stadium: Old Trafford; Attendance: 53,993; Referee: José María García-Aranda (Spain)

19 October 1999 4	Marseille (France)	1–0	(England) Manchester United	Marseille, France
20:45	Gallas 69'	Report		Stadium: Stade Vélodrome; Attendance: 56,732; Referee: Hellmut Krug (Germany)

27 October 1999 5	Sturm Graz (Austria)	3–2	(France) Marseille	Graz, Austria
20:45	Mählich 17'; Kocijan 61', 85'	Report	Dugarry 53', 78'	Stadium: Arnold Schwarzenegger-Stadium; Attendance: 14,850; Referee: Atanas Uzunov (Bulgaria)

2 November 1999 6	Marseille (France)	2–2	Croatia Zagreb	Marseille, France
20:45	Bakayoko 53'; Diawara 89'	Report	Mujčin 42'; Mikić 78'	Stadium: Stade Vélodrome; Attendance: 33,651; Referee: Pierluigi Collina (Italy)

==== Second group stage ====
Pos	Team	Pld	W	D	L	GF	GA	GD	Pts	Qualification
1	(Italy) Lazio	6	3	2	1	10	4	+6	11	Advance to knockout stage
2	(England) Chelsea	6	3	1	2	8	5	+3	10	Advance to knockout stage
3	(Netherlands) Feyenoord	6	2	2	2	7	7	0	8	
4	(France) Marseille	6	1	1	4	2	11	−9	4	

Source: UEFA

24 November 1999 1	Marseille (France)	0–2	(Italy) Lazio	Marseille, France
20:45		Report	Stanković 64'; Conceição 77'	Stadium: Stade Vélodrome; Attendance: 42,261; Referee: Manuel Díaz Vega (Spain)

7 December 1999 2	Feyenoord (Netherlands)	3–0	(France) Marseille	Rotterdam, Netherlands
20:45	Cruz 72', 90'; Bosvelt 83'	Report		Stadium: De Kuip; Attendance: 38,500; Referee: Vítor Melo Pereira (Portugal)

29 February 2000 3	Marseille (France)	1–0	(England) Chelsea	Marseille, France
20:45	Pires 16'	Report		Stadium: Stade Vélodrome; Attendance: 24,700; Referee: Rune Pedersen (Norway)

8 March 2000 4	Chelsea (England)	1–0	(France) Marseille	London, England
19:45	Wise 27'	Report		Stadium: Stamford Bridge; Attendance: 33,206; Referee: Juan Fernandez Marin (Spain)

14 March 2000 5	Lazio (Italy)	5–1	(France) Marseille	Rome, Italy
20:45	Inzaghi 17', 37', 38', 71'; Bokšić 82'	Report	Leroy 50'	Stadium: Stadio Olimpico; Attendance: 28,875; Referee: Anders Frisk (Sweden)

22 March 2000 6	Marseille (France)	0–0	(Netherlands) Feyenoord	Marseille, France
20:45		Report		Stadium: Stade Vélodrome; Attendance: 9,000; Referee: Arturo Daudén Ibáñez (Spain)

== Sources ==
- RSSSF - France 1999/2000
