= Ludovic Quistin =

Guadeloupean footballer (1984–2012)

Personal information
- Date of birth: 24 May 1984
- Place of birth: Les Abymes, Guadeloupe
- Date of death: 28 May 2012 (aged 28)
- Place of death: Grande-Terre, Guadeloupe
- Height: 5 ft 11 in (1.80 m)
- Positions: Left-back; left winger

Senior career*
Years	Team	Apps	(Gls)
- Gravesend & Northfleet
- Windsor & Eton
2003–2004	Carshalton Athletic		
2004	Billericay Town	1	(0)
2005	King's Lynn	16	(1)
2005–2006	Havant & Waterlooville	2	(0)
2006	Dorchester Town	3	(0)
2006	→Tooting & Mitcham United (loan)	3	(0)
2006	Harlow Town		
2007	Tamworth	12	(0)
2007	Boston United	5	(0)
2007	Swindon Supermarine	5	(0)
2007–2008	Halesowen Town	4	(0)
2008	Hednesford Town	1	(0)
2008	Weston-super-Mare	8	(0)
2008–2009	Fisher Athletic	5	(1)
2009	Grays Athletic	2	(0)
2009	Hednesford Town		(0)
2009–2010	FC United of Manchester	29	(0)

International career
2007–2012	Guadeloupe	9	(0)
- * Club domestic league appearances and goals

Ludovic "Luda" Quistin (24 May 1984 – 28 May 2012) was a Guadeloupean footballer who played as a defender. He also represented Guadeloupe and was a member of their squad.

Quistin had a nomadic career after he arrived in England, turning out for a number of non-League sides at different levels of the football pyramid.

== Club career ==
Quistin spent much of his short span of years in playing English football in the southern part of the country. He had spells with Brentford, Wimbledon, Falkirk, Gravesend & Northfleet and Windsor & Eton, before joining Carshalton Athletic in February 2003. He joined Billericay Town in August 2004, but was released the following month. He joined King's Lynn in January 2005.

He played out the 2004–05 season with King's Lynn, although he also had a trial with League Two side Wycombe Wanderers in April 2005. In September 2005 he joined Conference South side Havant & Waterlooville. After only three substitute appearances, he was loaned out to Isthmian League side Tooting & Mitcham, before returning to Havant towards the end of the season. He was sacked by Havant in August 2006 for misconduct, and had an unsuccessful trial with Cambridge City later than month, before joining Harlow Town for a spell.

Conference South side Dorchester Town was next on Quistin's map, but in a typically short spell he made just three substitute appearances for the Magpies before he left to take trials at a number of league clubs, turning out for Luton Town, Leyton Orient and Brentford. He joined doomed Conference National side Tamworth in March 2007, and was involved in the majority of the Lambs' final games of the season before being sent off in the 1–1 draw at home to St Albans City that saw the side relegated to the Conference North. He was released at the end of the season.

In July 2007, Quistin had an unsuccessful trial with Barnet, playing in their 5–1 defeat away to Farnborough Town. He returned to Lincolnshire later that month, signing for Conference North side Boston United. He was substitute five times before moving to Southern League side Swindon Supermarine in September 2007, linking up with friend Cedric Abraham. In November 2007, after nine games for Supermarine, Quistin joined Halesowen Town, where he played until his release in May 2008.

He joined Hednesford Town on trial in July, and was voted man of the match in his first game for the club. After an equally impressive showing three days later, the club signed him up on a one-year deal. However, he left the club in September 2008 after sending manager Dean Edwards a text message saying that he was not prepared to sit on the substitutes bench.

Following his departure from Hednesford, he joined Weston-super-Mare later in September 2008. He was released by Weston in December 2008, and joined Fisher Athletic later the same month.

Quistin signed for Grays Athletic on non-contract terms in February 2009, but following two appearances, he left the club in March, re-joining Hednesford Town.

It was announced on 23 October 2009 he had signed for F.C. United of Manchester, having relocated to the north west of England.

During February and March 2011, Quistin featured in a number of reserve team games for Conference National outfit Forest Green Rovers. He would also go on to feature a reserve game for Wolverhampton Wanderers.

== International career ==
Quistin made his international debut for Guadeloupe in June 2007 against Haiti in a CONCACAF Gold Cup match, coming on as a late substitute. In December 2008, he was part of the Guadeloupe side that beat Cuba on penalties to qualify for the 2009 Gold Cup Finals.

== Personal life ==
Quistin was the cousin of former Arsenal captain and France defender William Gallas.

== Death ==
Quistin was killed in a traffic accident in Bouliqui on Grande-Terre, Guadeloupe on 28 May 2012.
