= William Gallas =

French footballer (born 1977)

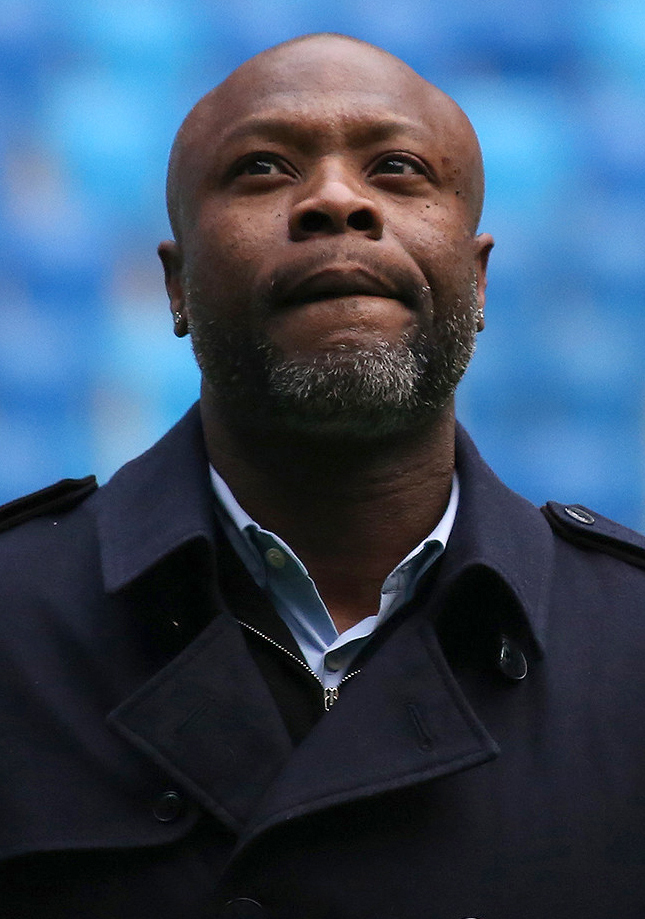
- Gallas in 2018

Personal information
- Full name: William Eric Gallas
- Date of birth: 17 August 1977 (age 49)
- Place of birth: Asnières-sur-Seine, Hauts-de-Seine, France
- Height: 1.81 m (5 ft 11 in)
- Position: Defender

Youth career
- 1987–1992: Villeneuve-la-Garenne
- 1992–1993: RCF Paris
- 1992–1994: INF Clairefontaine
- 1994–1995: Caen

Senior career*
Years	Team	Apps	(Gls)
1995–1997	Caen	34	(0)
1997–2001	Marseille	85	(2)
2001–2006	Chelsea	159	(12)
2006–2010	Arsenal	101	(12)
2010–2013	Tottenham Hotspur	61	(1)
2013–2014	Perth Glory	15	(1)
Total		455	(28)

International career
1997	France U20	3	(0)
1997–1998	France U21	11	(0)
2002–2010	France	84	(5)
Medal record
Men's football
Representing France
FIFA Confederations Cup
Winner	2003
FIFA World Cup
Runner-up	2006
- * Club domestic league appearances and goals

William Eric Gallas (French pronunciation: [wiljam ɡalas]; born 17 August 1977) is a French football coach and former professional footballer who played as a defender. He played most of his footballing career in France and England before finishing his career in Australia with A-League club Perth Glory. Gallas is currently a youth team coach at Hungarian club Zalaegerszegi TE.

Gallas began his playing career in France, before being signed by English club Chelsea in 2001. He transferred to Arsenal as part of an exchange deal in 2006. He then signed for rivals Tottenham Hotspur in 2010. He retired from professional football on 16 October 2014.

== Early life ==
William Eric Gallas was born on 17 August 1977 (exactly the birth date & year as Thierry Henry) in Asnières-sur-Seine, a commune in the Hauts-de-Seine department which lies in the northwestern suburbs of Paris. He is the cousin of the deceased former footballer Ludovic Quistin and of Mathieu Bastareaud, a French rugby union centre playing for Lyon.

== Club career ==
=== Early career ===
A graduate of the French football academy at Clairefontaine, Gallas started his professional career at second division Caen, helping them to promotion as champions in 1996. He subsequently transferred to Marseille in 1997, where he played for four seasons. He made his debut in the UEFA Champions League for Marseille, scoring his first goal in European competition in a 1–0 win over then European champions Manchester United at the Stade Vélodrome in October 1999.

=== Chelsea ===
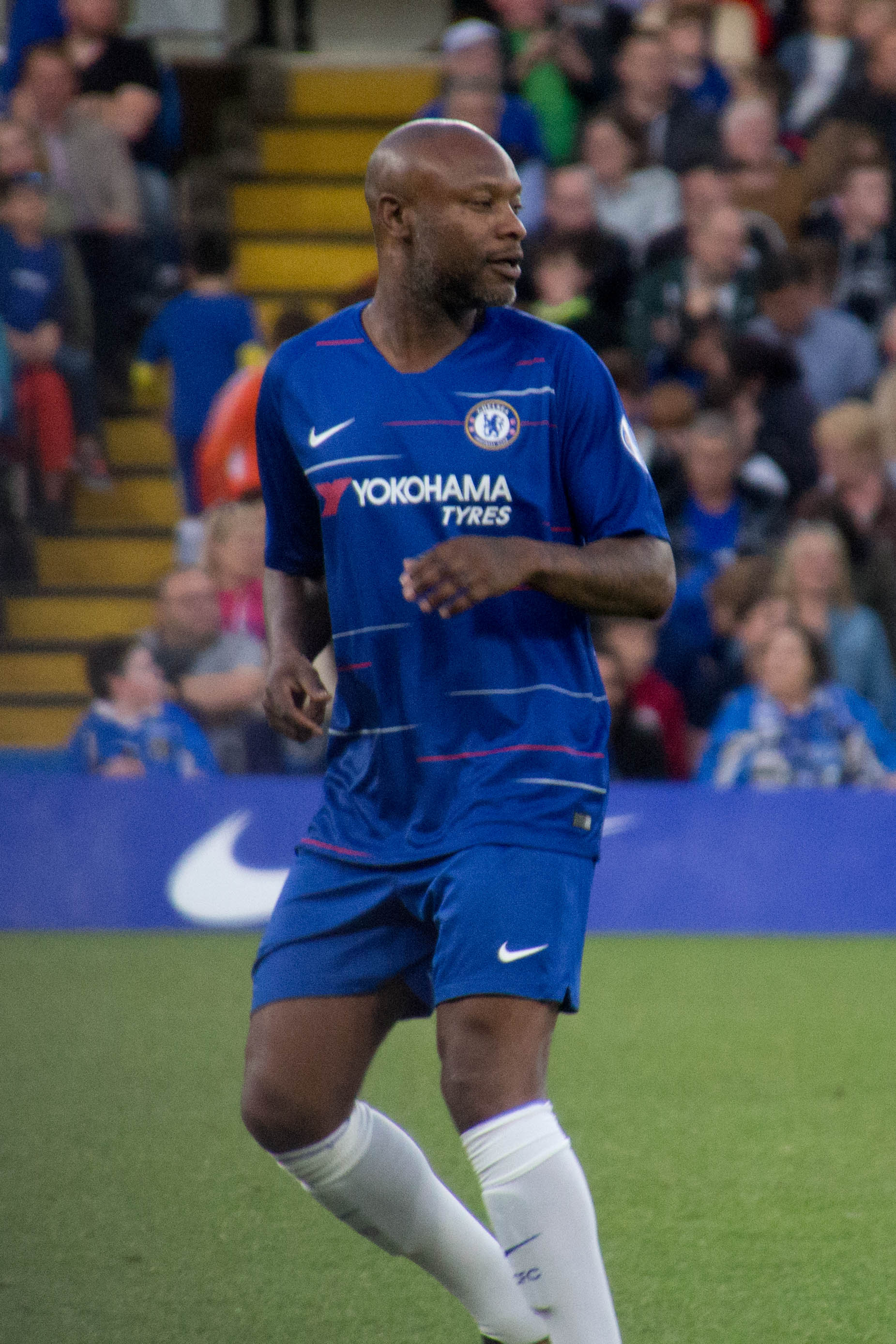
Gallas playing for the Chelsea legends against Inter in a friendly match.

Chelsea manager Claudio Ranieri bought Gallas from Marseille in 2001 for £6.2 million. He chose the number 13 shirt because it was his postcode back where he lived in Marseille. Under Ranieri, Gallas developed centre-back partnerships with Marcel Desailly and later with John Terry. His partnership with Terry included a run of 16 games without conceding a goal. He also played as a left-back at times. It was with Chelsea and under Ranieri where Gallas obtained his first international cap for France. Gallas made his debut as a substitute for John Terry against Newcastle United in August 2001. His first goal followed in the FA Cup against Tottenham Hotspur. Chelsea ended up reaching the 2002 FA Cup Final in which Gallas started, however they were defeated by Arsenal.

Gallas was part of the Chelsea squad which won back-to-back Premier League titles and a League Cup under Ranieri's successor José Mourinho. The Blues also made the semi-finals of the UEFA Champions League that year, but were knocked out by Liverpool 1–0 in controversial circumstances—Gallas cleared the ball, after it was adjudged to have crossed the line.

Due to a serious injury to left-back Wayne Bridge in 2004–05, Gallas was forced to play out of position, and despite the purchase of Asier del Horno from Athletic Bilbao for £8 million in the 2005 close season, Gallas found himself often playing on the left, a situation he grew increasingly frustrated with, although it did showcase his versatility, being able to play anywhere in the backline. Gallas scored some vital goals against Liverpool, Tottenham Hotspur and Manchester United as Chelsea retained their title in the 2005–06 Premier League season.

Gallas' contract with Chelsea was due to expire in May 2007. He refused to sign a new contract with Chelsea on improved terms after saying the club did not offer him enough money and expressed a wish to play in the Italian Serie A, with Juventus and Milan both interested. Chelsea, however, did not agree to a transfer request by the player in May 2006, as they considered Gallas an important first-team member. After the 2006 FIFA World Cup, Gallas refused to turn up at Chelsea's crowded ranks of defenders at Stamford Bridge, so Chelsea signed Dutch international centre back Khalid Boulahrouz, though in his single season at Chelsea, Boulahrouz would play almost exclusively as a fullback.

On 1 September 2006, Gallas transferred to Arsenal as part of a deal that brought Ashley Cole to Chelsea, in addition to Arsenal receiving £5 million. After the transfer, Chelsea issued a statement that Gallas threatened to deliberately score own goals if he was not allowed to leave Chelsea. Gallas rejected Chelsea's claim and accused the West Londoners of "lacking class" and "hiding behind false accusations." Claudio Ranieri, the former Chelsea manager who signed Gallas from Marseille, said of the allegations, "I cannot believe these stories. It is absolutely incredible. I signed William and he was always a good professional on the pitch. Of course, I don't know what has happened in the last two years." PFA Chief Executive Gordon Taylor declared that the whole episode has left a "bad taste in the mouth" and that Chelsea's statement should be taken "with a large pinch of salt."

=== Arsenal ===
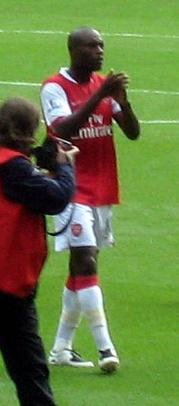
Gallas applauding supporters

Gallas signed a four-year contract with Arsenal, where he took the number 10 shirt vacated by the recently retired Dennis Bergkamp. In an October 2006 interview with the official team magazine, Arsenal manager Arsène Wenger explained his decision to hand him the squad number 10 (traditionally a forward's or a midfielder's number): "Number three was uncomfortable for him and I had given the rest of the numbers out. In the end I thought it might be a good idea to give the number ten to a defender, because a striker would suffer a lot with the comparison with Dennis. At first I was reluctant to give Dennis's number out, and especially to a defender, but overall I think it's better that way."

Gallas made his full debut for the Gunners at left-back in the team's 1–1 draw against Middlesbrough at the Emirates Stadium on 9 September 2006 and scored his first goal against Sheffield United on 23 September 2006.

Gallas was confirmed as Arsenal captain on 9 August 2007, with Kolo Touré serving as vice-captain. This caused some controversy, however, as Gilberto Silva was expected to receive the captain's armband. His first competitive game as Arsenal captain was on 12 August 2007 against Fulham, which ended in a 2–1 victory for Arsenal. Gallas suffered a groin injury in the game against Blackburn Rovers on 19 August, but returned to play for Arsenal in their 2–0 victory over Bolton Wanderers on 20 October. On 3 November, at home to Manchester United, Gallas scored an own goal which initially gave United the lead, but made up for it by scoring an injury-time equaliser to give the Gunners a 2–2 draw.

On 24 November 2007, Gallas scored against Wigan Athletic, heading past goalkeeper Mike Pollitt from Bacary Sagna's cross. On 16 December, Gallas scored against his old club Chelsea, which was to be the only goal in the match to secure three points for Arsenal.

Gallas drew some criticism as a result of his actions in a 2–2 draw against Birmingham City at St. Andrew's on 23 February 2008, a game that saw Eduardo's leg broken following a challenge by Martin Taylor (who was subsequently sent off). With Arsenal leading 2–1 in injury time at the end of the second half, Gaël Clichy conceded a penalty; Gallas walked into the Birmingham half, apparently in protest, where he watched as Birmingham striker James McFadden converted the penalty. He then had to be restrained as he appeared to confront the crowd in fury. After the final whistle, Gallas sat down on the pitch as the rest of the players left the field before being consoled by manager Arsène Wenger.

Gallas scored for Arsenal against Bolton at Reebok Stadium in a 2–3 win on 29 March 2008, starting the comeback which ten-man Arsenal ultimately completed. Amid speculation that Gallas would be replaced as club captain following his behaviour during the Birmingham game, Wenger said that he would consider the matter at the end of the season.

In August 2008, it was announced that Gallas would remain the club's captain for the 2008–09 season. In the 2008–09 season, Gallas proved prolific in the Champions League. He scored six goals in Arsenal's campaign, including two against Dutch side Twente and an equaliser against Dynamo Kyiv, as well as a header against Spurs. On 29 October 2008, he scored his first league goal of the season against Tottenham at the Emirates, scoring Arsenal's second goal in a 4–4 draw. On 8 November 2008, in a 2–1 victory over Manchester United, he received praise for his display whilst playing alongside former United defender Mikaël Silvestre. It was claimed he outshone United defenders Rio Ferdinand and Nemanja Vidić.

In November, Gallas gave an interview to the Associated Press in which he revealed tensions within the squad which were disruptive to team morale, and suggested that Arsenal's younger players needed to show more courage if the team were to be successful. He was dropped from the squad for the next match, against Manchester City, and was reported to have been fined two weeks' wages. Reports that he had been stripped of the captaincy permanently were confirmed by Arsenal on 24 November, and he was succeeded by Cesc Fàbregas. Wenger confirmed that Gallas still had a future with the club, contrary to media speculation, and Gallas played in the following day's Champions League match.

On 17 March 2009, Gallas scored the winner in a 2–1 win against Hull City in the quarter-finals of the FA Cup. On 10 April 2009, it was confirmed that Gallas would miss the remainder of the season after damaging the medial ligament in his right knee during the 2008–09 UEFA Champions League quarter-final first leg tie against Villarreal. The match finished 1–1 with Gallas only lasting 43 minutes of the first half.

Gallas started the 2009–10 campaign in fine form, scoring three goals in his first three games. He formed a partnership with Belgian centre back Thomas Vermaelen, Arsenal's only major summer signing, and the pair scored seven goals between them in their first eight league games. On 22 August, in the first home game of the season, he scored a bizarre goal against Portsmouth; Vermaelen had attempted to score a slide-in from a corner kick, but Gallas accidentally flicked the ball onto his face and it bounced into the net.

On 17 February, Gallas started his 100th league game for Arsenal in the 2–0 defeat against Chelsea at Stamford Bridge. He suffered an injury-hit second half of the season and did not play for over two months; he was surprisingly included in the starting line up against Barcelona only to get stretchered off before half-time with a recurrence of the injury. It proved to be his last game for Arsenal—after talks over a new contract failed, Gallas left the club over the summer as a free agent having made a total of 142 appearances and scoring 17 goals for the club.

On 28 April, Arsène Wenger announced that talks about Gallas' future will only go until end of May and that if an agreement was not reached by then, he would most likely leave the club. Public statements made by Arsenal Chairman Peter Hill-Wood suggested that the club felt that the contractual demands made by Gallas were unreasonable. It was reported that such demands included an £80,000-a-week wage over a two-year period.

=== Tottenham Hotspur ===
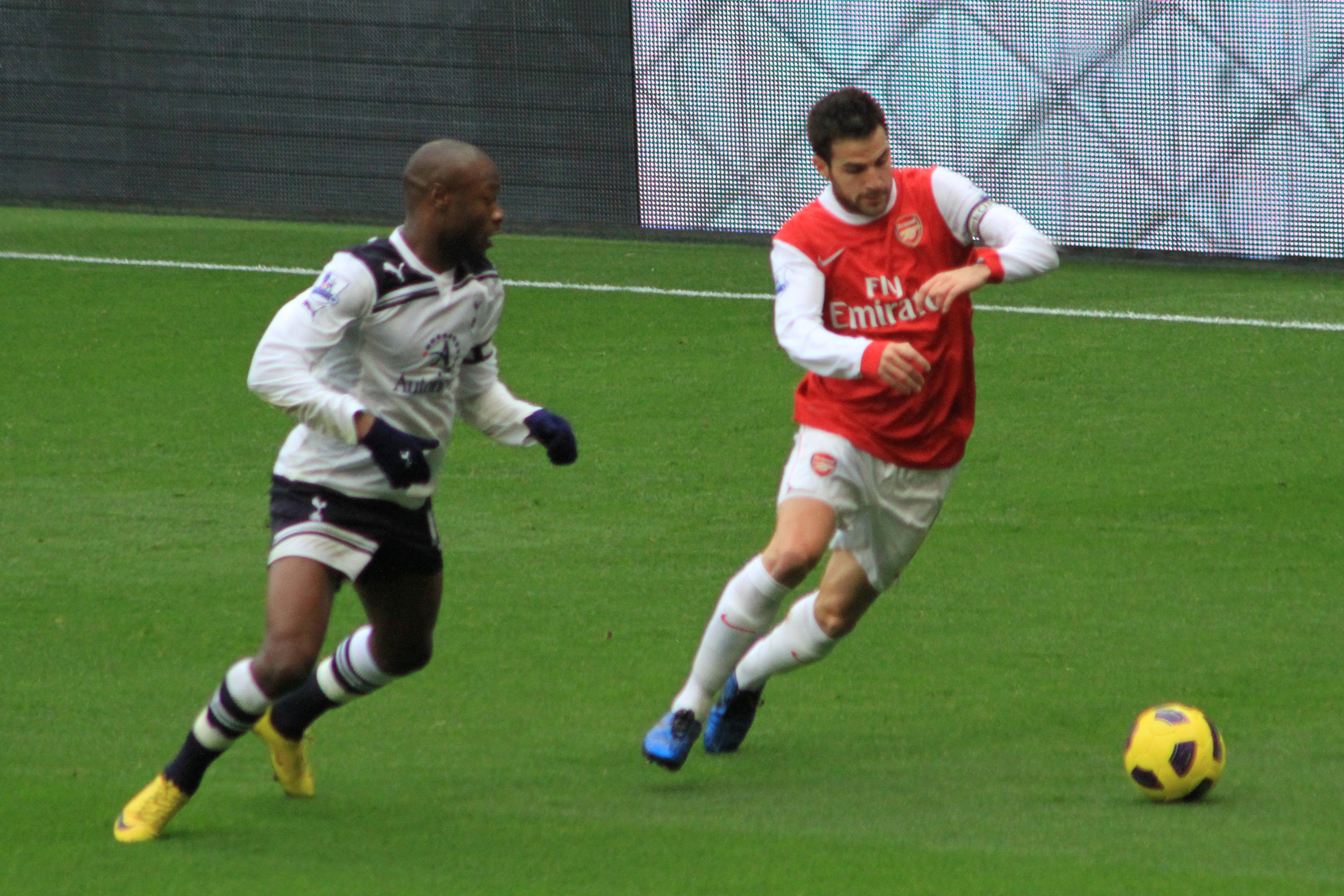
Gallas (left) defending Cesc Fàbregas, 2010

On 20 August 2010, Tottenham Hotspur manager Harry Redknapp confirmed that Gallas was set to join the club and described the move as a "no-brainer." The transfer was confirmed on 22 August, with Gallas signing a one-year contract at White Hart Lane. According to Tottenham's club historian, the move meant that Gallas would become the first player to have appeared for Chelsea, Arsenal and Tottenham; Clive Allen played for Tottenham and Chelsea and had a spell with Arsenal early in his career, but did not make an appearance for them. After training with his new team for the first time, Gallas stated that he believed that Spurs have the potential to win the Premier League.

Gallas made his first-team debut on 11 September in a 1–1 draw away at West Bromwich Albion. On 20 November, as a result of injuries to regular captains Ledley King and Michael Dawson, Gallas captained Tottenham for the first time against his former club Arsenal at the Emirates Stadium in a famous 2–3 Tottenham victory, Spurs' first league victory at Arsenal since 1993. On 2 February 2011, Gallas partnered Sébastien Bassong at the back against Blackburn at Ewood Park in their 1–0 midweek victory. Gallas continued to impress for Tottenham into 2011. In the Champions League knockout stages, he put in two commanding performances against Milan to set up a quarter-final tie against Real Madrid in the club's first attempt in the competition.

Despite a season of frequent changes in defence for Tottenham due to a host of injuries to his fellow defenders, Gallas performed strongly throughout his first season with the club and was rewarded with a two-year contract extension in March 2011, which kept him at the club until the end of the 2012–13 season. In his debut season at Spurs, he made 36 appearances in all competitions.

During the 2011–12 Premier League, Gallas suffered several injuries that hindered his playing time for the season, making just 19 appearances for Tottenham during the campaign, particularly in light of the competition for the center-back spot with Michael Dawson and Ledley King. In the following season, Gallas played 17 games in the Premier League, scoring his first goal for the club—and also his first goal in over two years—against former club Chelsea in a 4–2 defeat. On 7 June 2013, the Premier League confirmed that he had been released from Tottenham.

=== Perth Glory ===
On 23 October 2013, Gallas signed a one-year deal with Perth Glory, becoming the first Frenchman to play in the Australian A-League. Gallas joined the league following the arrival of other international players, Alessandro Del Piero, Emile Heskey and Shinji Ono. Gallas made his debut for Perth in round 6 against Adelaide United, coming on as substitute. He scored his first goal on 3 September 2014 in a 1–1 draw against Wellington Phoenix He retired after the end of the 2013–14 A-League, making 14 appearances and scoring one goal.

== International career ==
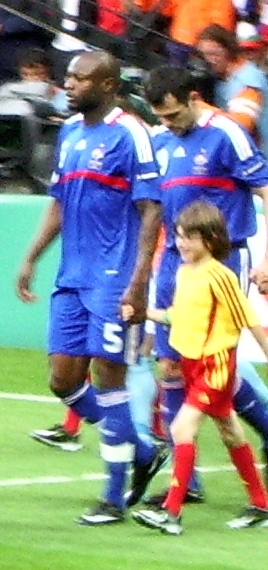
Gallas with France at UEFA Euro 2008

Gallas was a part of the France U-18 European Championship winning side. He also played for the France U-20 team in the 1997 FIFA World Youth Championship along with Thierry Henry, David Trezeguet, Nicolas Anelka, Mikaël Silvestre and Willy Sagnol.

In October 2002, Gallas debuted for the France senior team in a UEFA Euro 2004 qualifier against Slovenia. He was included in France's squad for the 2003 FIFA Confederations Cup and played the full 90 minutes as Les Bleus defeated Cameroon 1–0 in the final. He went on to represent France at UEFA Euro 2004, starting in three of France's four matches, as they were knocked out by eventual champions Greece. In August 2005, Gallas scored his first goal for the national team in a friendly match against the Ivory Coast.

Gallas was ever present as France finished runner-up in the 2006 FIFA World Cup, losing on penalties to Italy at the Berlin Olympiastadion. In September 2006, he won his 50th cap for France in a 3–1 win against Italy at the Stade de France in a UEFA Euro 2008 qualifier. At UEFA Euro 2008, Gallas was a regular starter as France were knocked out at the group stage.

In November 2009, Gallas scored a goal which qualified France for the 2010 FIFA World Cup. The goal came against the Republic of Ireland in extra time of a World Cup playoff, making the score 1–1, and 2–1 to France on aggregate. The goal was controversial as it was scored after his teammate, Thierry Henry handled the ball twice.

Gallas was included in France's squad for the 2010 World Cup. The tournament was a disaster for France as Nicolas Anelka was expelled by coach Raymond Domenech and the team went on strike from training. As a senior member of the team, Gallas was cited as being one of the disruptive influences in an inharmonious camp. After the tournament, Gallas criticised Domenech, blaming the former coach for France's first round elimination.

On 6 June 2011, aged 33 and with 84 caps to his name and 5 goals he announced his retirement from international football with immediate effect after he had not been selected in the year since the World Cup. Gallas was eligible to represent Guadeloupe internationally as well, as they are not FIFA-affiliated. His cousin Ludovic Quistin has represented Guadeloupe.

== Career statistics ==
=== Club ===
Appearances and goals by club, season and competition
Club	Season	League			National cup		League cup		Continental		Other		Total	
Club	Season	Division	Apps	Goals	Apps	Goals	Apps	Goals	Apps	Goals	Apps	Goals	Apps	Goals
Caen	1995–96	Division 2	16	0	0	0	3	0	–		–		19	0
Caen	1996–97	Division 1	18	0	3	0	0	0	–		–		21	0
Caen	Total		34	0	3	0	3	0	–		–		40	0
Marseille	1997–98	Division 1	3	0	0	0	0	0	–		–		3	0
Marseille	1998–99	Division 1	30	0	0	0	3	0	9 (Note: Appearances in UEFA Cup)	0	–		42	0
Marseille	1999–2000	Division 1	22	0	0	0	2	0	7 (Note: Appearances in UEFA Champions League)	1	–		31	1
Marseille	2000–01	Division 1	30	2	0	0	2	0	–		–		32	2
Marseille	Total		85	2	0	0	7	0	16	1	–		108	3
Chelsea	2001–02	Premier League	30	1	4	1	4	0	3	0	–		41	2
Chelsea	2002–03	Premier League	38	4	5	0	3	0	2	0	–		48	4
Chelsea	2003–04	Premier League	29	0	4	0	1	0	11	1	–		45	1
Chelsea	2004–05	Premier League	28	2	1	0	5	0	12	0	–		46	2
Chelsea	2005–06	Premier League	34	5	3	0	0	0	7	0	1 (Note: Appearance in FA Community Shield)	0	45	5
Chelsea	Total		159	12	17	1	13	0	35	1	1	0	225	14
Arsenal	2006–07	Premier League	21	3	2	0	0	0	6	0	–		29	3
Arsenal	2007–08	Premier League	31	4	2	0	1	0	8	0	–		42	4
Arsenal	2008–09	Premier League	23	2	4	1	0	0	9	3	–		36	6
Arsenal	2009–10	Premier League	26	3	1	0	0	0	8	1	–		35	4
Arsenal	Total		101	12	9	1	1	0	31	4	–		142	17
Tottenham Hotspur	2010–11	Premier League	27	0	1	0	0	0	8	0	–		36	0
Tottenham Hotspur	2011–12	Premier League	15	0	1	0	0	0	2 (Note: Appearances in UEFA Europa League)	0	–		18	0
Tottenham Hotspur	2012–13	Premier League	19	1	0	0	0	0	5	0	–		24	1
Tottenham Hotspur	Total		61	1	2	0	0	0	15	0	–		78	1
Perth Glory	2013–14	A-League	15	1	–		–		–		–		15	1
Career total			455	28	31	2	24	0	97	6	1	0	608	36

=== International ===
Appearances and goals by national team and year

National tea	Year	Apps	Goals
France	2002	3	0
France	2003	8	0
France	2004	15	0
France	2005	11	1
France	2006	15	1
France	2007	7	0
France	2008	10	0
France	2009	9	2
France	2010	6	1
Total		84	5

International goals

#	Date	Venue	Opponent	Score	Result	Competition
1	17 August 2005	Stade de la Mosson, Montpellier, France	Ivory Coast	1–0	3–0	Friendly
2	16 August 2006	Koševo Stadium, Sarajevo, Bosnia and Herzegovina	Bosnia and Herzegovina	1–1	1–2	Friendly
3	10 October 2009	Stade du Roudourou, Guingamp, France	Faroe Islands	3–0	5–0	2010 World Cup qualification
4	18 November 2009	Stade de France, Saint-Denis, France	Republic of Ireland	1–1	1–1	2010 World Cup qualification
5	30 May 2010	Stade 7 Novembre, Radès, Tunisia	Tunisia	1–1	1–1	Friendly

== Honours ==
Caen

- Division 2: 1995–96

Chelsea

- Premier League: 2004–05, 2005–06
- Football League Cup: 2004–05
- FA Community Shield: 2005
- FA Cup runner-up: 2001–02

France

- FIFA Confederations Cup: 2003
- FIFA World Cup runner-up: 2006

Individual

- French Division 1 Rookie of the Year: 1999
- PFA Team of the Year: 2002–03 Premier League, 2005−06 Premier League
- ESM Team of the Year: 2007−08
