= Jérôme Pérez =

French footballer (born 1982)

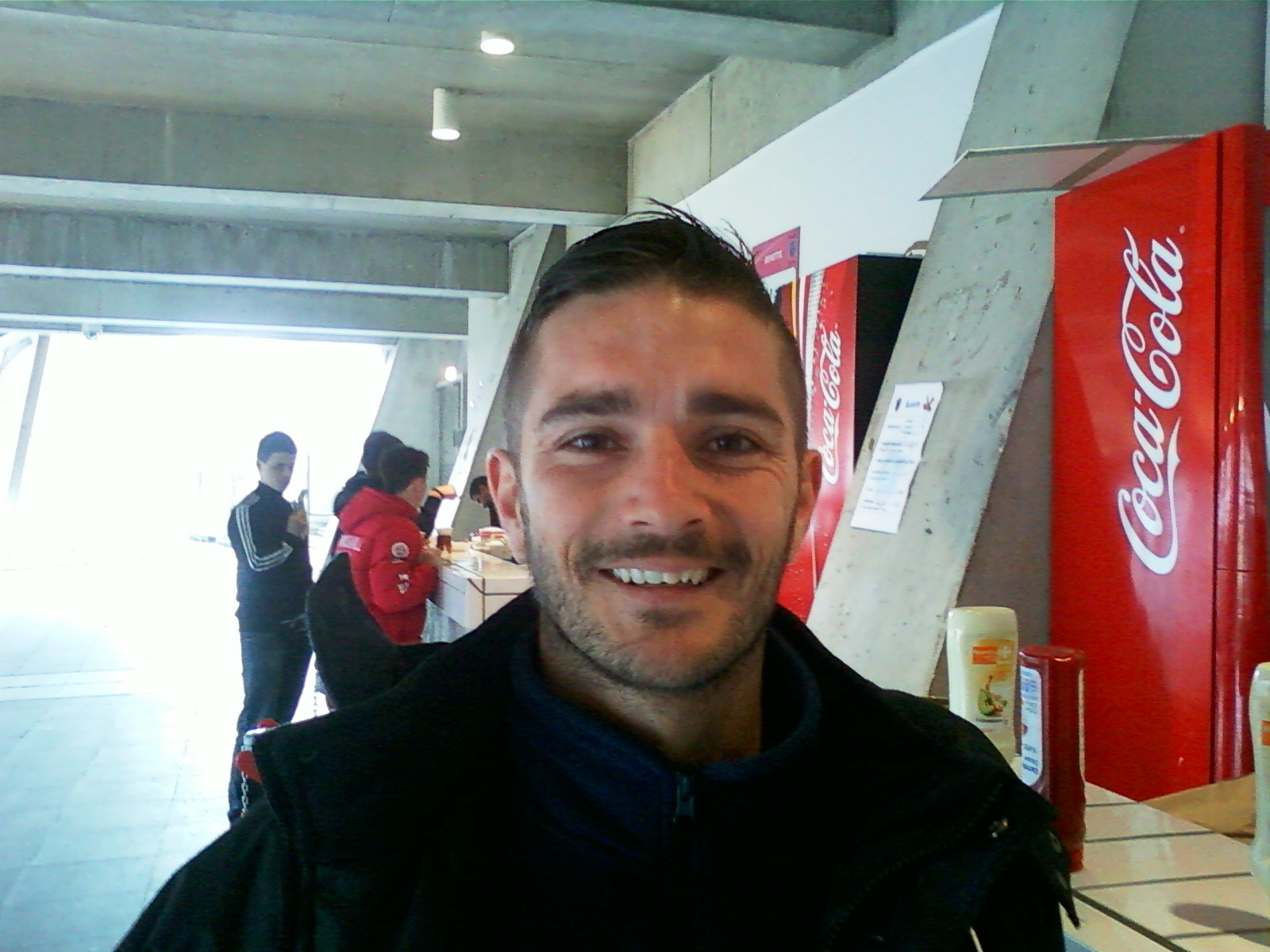
- image of Jerome Pérez, was a French footballer.

Personal information
- Date of birth: February 18, 1982 (age 44)
- Place of birth: Avignon, France
- Height: 1.70 m (5 ft 7 in)
- Position: Defender

Senior career*
Years	Team	Apps	(Gls)
1999–2002	Marseille B		
2002–2003	Marseille	2	(0)
2003–2007	US Créteil-Lusitanos	112	(6)
2007–2008	Racing Besançon		
2008	Sedan		
2008–2011	Le Pontet		
2011–2014	Orléans		
- * Club domestic league appearances and goals as of 10 October 2023

Jérôme Pérez (born February 18, 1982) is a French former professional footballer. Pérez played on the professional level in Ligue 1 for Olympique de Marseille and Ligue 2 for US Créteil-Lusitanos, and also played for Sedan B and US Le Pontet.
