= Xavier Gravelaine =

French footballer (born 1968)

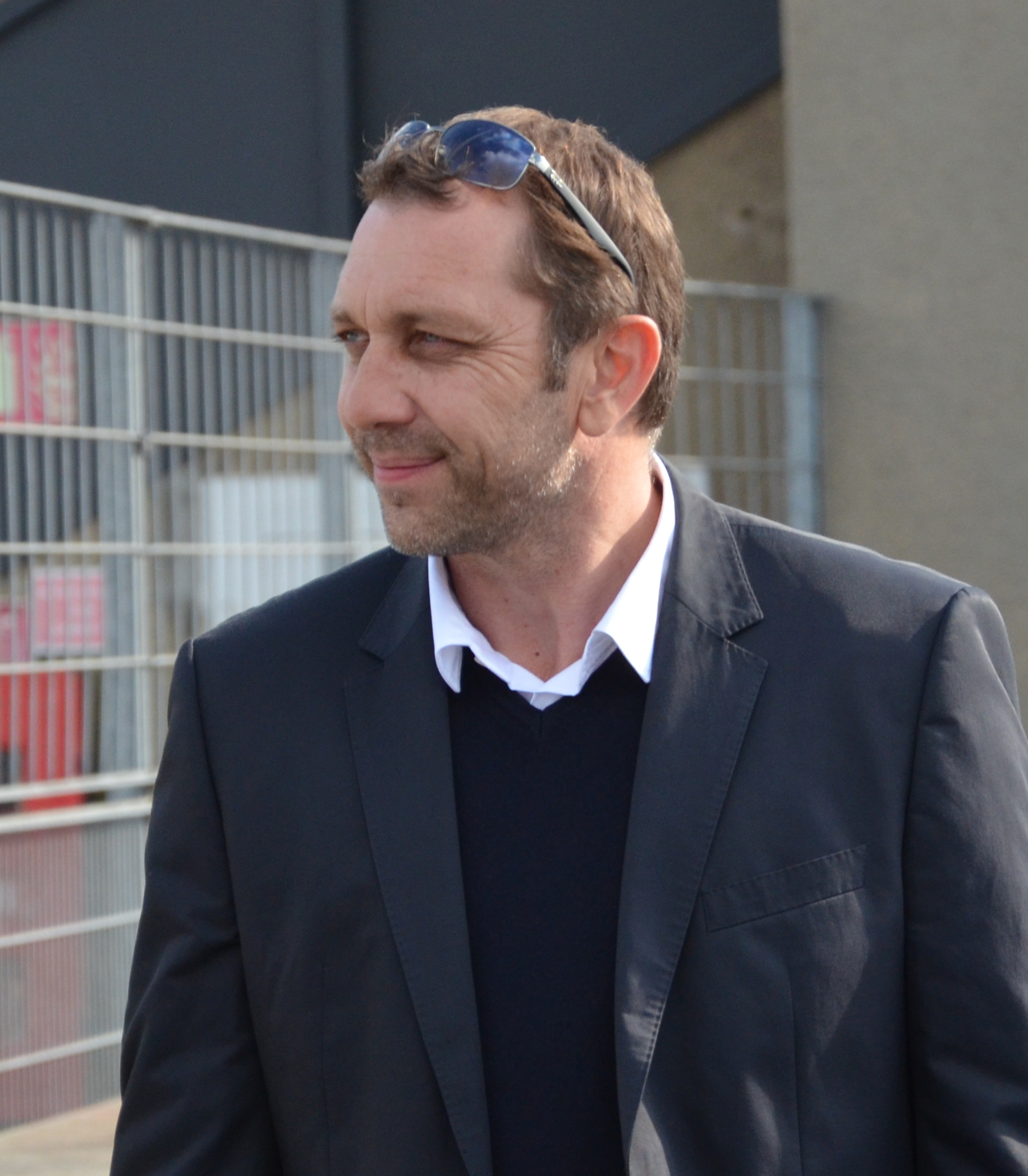
- Gravelaine in 2014

Personal information
- Date of birth: 5 October 1968 (age 58)
- Place of birth: Tours, Indre-et-Loire, France
- Height: 1.82 m (6 ft 0 in)
- Positions: Attacking midfielder; forward

Youth career
- 1983–1986: Nantes

Senior career*
Years	Team	Apps	(Gls)
1986–1988	Nantes	0	(0)
1988–1989	Pau FC	29	(22)
1989–1990	AS Saint-Seurin	30	(10)
1990–1991	Laval	32	(12)
1991–1993	Caen	69	(26)
1993–1994	Paris Saint-Germain	21	(2)
1994–1995	Strasbourg	33	(9)
1995	Paris Saint-Germain	5	(1)
1995–1996	Guingamp	17	(7)
1996–1998	Marseille	62	(25)
1998	Paris Saint-Germain	7	(0)
1998–1999	Montpellier	18	(3)
1999	Paris Saint-Germain	0	(0)
1999–2000	Watford	7	(2)
2000	Le Havre	11	(1)
2000–2001	Monaco	8	(0)
2001–2002	Caen	32	(15)
2002	Ajaccio	0	(0)
2003–2004	Istres	44	(9)
2004	Sion	9	(3)
Total		405	(125)

International career
1992–1993	France	4	(0)

Managerial career
- 2005: Istres
- * Club domestic league appearances and goals

Xavier Gravelaine (born 5 October 1968) is a French football manager and former football player, who played for many clubs in France and Europe and for the France national team.

== Career ==
Gravelaine was sometimes seen as a mercenary because of the impressive number of teams he played for, but often appreciated by supporters. In his spell in England, for Watford, he is remembered by the fans for scoring a brace in a 3–2 win over Southampton in December 1999.

After his retirement, he became a coach at Istres, but did not manage to save the team from relegation. He was a consultant on France Télévisions from 2004 to 2012, on Eurosport in 2013–2014. In 2014, he was appointed Deputy Director of Caen.
