= Christophe Dugarry =

French footballer (born 1972)

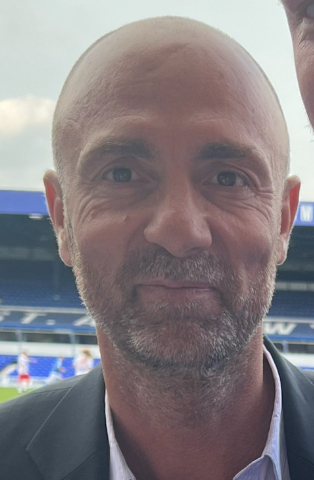
- Dugarry at a 2024 Birmingham City charity match

Personal information
- Full name: Christophe Jérôme Dugarry
- Date of birth: 24 March 1972 (age 54)
- Place of birth: Lormont, France
- Height: 1.88 m (6 ft 2 in)
- Position: Forward

Youth career
- –1988: US Lormont
- 1988: Bordeaux

Senior career*
Years	Team	Apps	(Gls)
1988–1996	Bordeaux	187	(34)
1996–1997	AC Milan	21	(5)
1997	Barcelona	7	(0)
1998–2000	Marseille	52	(8)
2000–2003	Bordeaux	65	(9)
2003	→ Birmingham City (loan)	16	(5)
2003–2004	Birmingham City	15	(1)
2004–2005	Qatar SC	0	(0)
Total		362	(62)

International career
1994–2002	France	55	(8)
Medal record
Men's football
Representing France
FIFA World Cup
Winner	1998
UEFA European Championship
Winner	2000
FIFA Confederations Cup
Winner	2001
- * Club domestic league appearances and goals

Christophe Jérôme Dugarry (French pronunciation: [kʁistɔf dyɡaʁi]; born 24 March 1972) is a French former professional footballer who played as a forward. He was a member of the France team that won the 1998 World Cup and Euro 2000. His clubs included Bordeaux, AC Milan, Barcelona, Marseille, Birmingham City and Qatar SC.

== Club career ==
Dugarry came through the youth ranks at Bordeaux alongside future France teammates Bixente Lizarazu and Zinedine Zidane. He spent eight years at Bordeaux, scoring 34 goals in 187 appearances. His two goals against AC Milan in the 1995–96 UEFA Cup quarter-finals helped to seal a move to that club for the 1996–97 season.

Dugarry managed just 5 goals in 27 appearances for Milan, before joining Barcelona the following season. After only seven appearances in his sole season there, he returned to France, first with Marseille. He then returned to Bordeaux, where he played another 65 games, scoring 9 goals.

In 2003, he joined Birmingham City on loan as the second World Cup-winner to join the team, the first being Argentinian Alberto Tarantini in 1978. His prominence earned him rough treatment from opposition defenders. After a run of 5 goals in 4 matches cemented the club's Premier League status, moving them from the relegation zone to 13th, Dugarry joined the club on a permanent two-year deal in May 2003. He saw out less than the first season, scoring once in 15 appearances before leaving the club by mutual consent, citing family reasons. He then signed a one-year contract with Qatar SC, where he made no appearances. Following this, he retired from football in 2005. He has since been inducted into Birmingham City's Hall of Fame.

== International career ==
Dugarry made his international debut in a 1–0 win against Australia on 26 May 1994. He was capped 55 times for the France national team and scored eight goals.

With France, Dugarry won the 1998 FIFA World Cup, Euro 2000 and the 2001 FIFA Confederations Cup. He also played at UEFA Euro 1996 and the 2002 FIFA World Cup.

== Career statistics ==
=== Club ===
Appearances and goals by club, season and competition
Club	Season	League			National cup (Note: Includes Coupe de France, Coppa Italia, Copa del Rey, FA Cup)		League cup (Note: Includes Coupe de la Ligue)		Europe		Other		Total	
Club	Season	Division	Apps	Goals	Apps	Goals	Apps	Goals	Apps	Goals	Apps	Goals	Apps	Goals
Bordeaux	1988–89	Division 1	2	0	0	0	—		0	0	—		2	0
Bordeaux	1989–90	Division 1	0	0	0	0	—		—		—		0	0
Bordeaux	1990–91	Division 1	32	3	1	0	—		5 (Note: Appearances in UEFA Cup)	1	—		38	4
Bordeaux	1991–92	Division 2	27	4	3	0	—		—		2 (Note: Appearances in Division 2 Championship match)	1	32	5
Bordeaux	1992–93	Division 1	35	6	3	0	—		—		—		38	6
Bordeaux	1993–94	Division 1	35	8	3	1	—		5	1	—		43	10
Bordeaux	1994–95	Division 1	32	9	2	0	1	1	4	1	—		39	11
Bordeaux	1995–96	Division 1	24	4	0	0	0	0	13 (Note: Five appearances and one goal in UEFA Intertoto Cup, eight appearances and four goals in UEFA Cup)	5	—		37	9
Bordeaux	Total		187	34	12	1	1	1	27	8	2	1	229	45
AC Milan	1996–97	Serie A	21	5	2	0	—		3 (Note: Appearances in UEFA Champions League)	1	—		26	6
Barcelona	1997–98	La Liga	7	0	—		—		4	0	2 (Note: Appearances in Supercopa de España)	0	13	0
Marseille	1997–98	Division 1	9	1	3	0	1	0	—		—		13	1
Marseille	1998–99	Division 1	28	4	2	0	1	1	10	3	—		41	8
Marseille	1999–2000	Division 1	15	3	—		—		4	2	—		19	5
Marseille	Total		52	8	5	0	2	1	14	5	—		73	14
Bordeaux	1999–2000	Division 1	12	3	5	2	2	0	—		—		19	5
Bordeaux	2000–01	Division 1	22	5	2	1	2	0	6	2	—		32	8
Bordeaux	2001–02	Division 1	18	1	1	0	3	0	4	3	—		26	4
Bordeaux	2002–03	Ligue 1	13	0	—		—		5	1	—		18	1
Bordeaux	Total		65	9	8	3	7	0	15	6	—		95	18
Birmingham City	2002–03	Premier League	16	5	—		—		—		—		16	5
Birmingham City	2003–04	Premier League	14	1	1	0	0	0	—		—		15	1
Birmingham City	Total		30	6	1	0	0	0	—		—		31	6
Total			362	62	28	4	10	2	63	20	4	1	467	89

=== International ===
Appearances and goals by national team and year
National team	Year	Apps	Goals
France	1994	5	0
France	1995	3	1
France	1996	7	1
France	1997	5	0
France	1998	9	2
France	1999	6	1
France	2000	9	2
France	2001	5	0
France	2002	6	1
Total		55	8

Scores and results list France's goal tally first, score column indicates score after each Dugarry goal.

List of international goals scored by Christophe Dugarry
No.	Date	Venue	Cap	Opponent	Score	Result	Competition	Ref.
1	6 September 1995	Stade de l'Abbé-Deschamps, Auxerre, France	7	Azerbaijan	6–0	10–0	UEFA Euro 1996 qualifying	
2	10 June 1996	St James' Park, Newcastle, England	12	Romania	1–0	1–0	UEFA Euro 1996	
3	12 June 1998	Stade Vélodrome, Marseille, France	25	South Africa	1–0	3–0	1998 FIFA World Cup	
4	5 September 1998	Laugardalsvöllur, Reykjavík, Iceland	28	Iceland	1–1	1–1	UEFA Euro 2000 qualifying	
5	31 March 1999	Stade de France, Saint-Denis, France	33	Armenia	2–0	2–0	UEFA Euro 2000 qualifying	
6	6 June 2000	Stade Mohammed V, Casablanca, Morocco	39	Morocco	3–1	5–1	Friendly	
7	21 June 2000	Amsterdam Arena, Amsterdam, Netherlands	41	Netherlands	1–0	2–3	UEFA Euro 2000	
8	26 May 2002	Suwon World Cup Stadium, Suwon, South Korea	52	South Korea	1–0	3–2	Friendly	

== Honours ==
Bordeaux

- Coupe de la Ligue: 2001–02
- Division 2: 1991–92
- UEFA Intertoto Cup: 1995

France

- FIFA World Cup: 1998
- UEFA European Championship: 2000
- FIFA Confederations Cup: 2001

Orders

- Knight of the Legion of Honour: 1998
