= Pape Sarr =

Senegalese footballer (born 1977)

Personal information
- Date of birth: 7 December 1977 (age 48)
- Place of birth: Dakar, Senegal
- Height: 1.80 m (5 ft 11 in)
- Position: Midfielder

Youth career
- 1995–1996: Saint-Étienne

Senior career*
Years	Team	Apps	(Gls)
1996–2001	Saint-Étienne	146	(12)
2001–2005	Lens	59	(2)
2004	→ Deportivo Alavés (Loan)	15	(0)
2005	→ Istres (Loan)	12	(0)
2006–2007	Brest	21	(2)
2007–2009	Paris FC	31	(5)
2009–2010	Valence	27	(3)
2010–2012	Noisy-le-Sec	43	(2)
Total		339	(26)

International career
2000–2004	Senegal	54	(3)
- * Club domestic league appearances and goals

Pape Sarr (born 7 December 1977) is a Senegalese former professional footballer who played as a midfielder.

== Club career ==
Sarr is a product of the academy of Saint-Étienne. He played for the club's first team from 1996 to 2001 before signing for Lens. In December 2002, Sarr he completed a two-day trial with Premier League club Everton. In 2004 and 2005, he enjoyed loan spells at Deportivo Alavés and Istres respectively.

== International career ==
Sarr was a participant in the successful 2002 FIFA World Cup campaign where Senegal reached the quarter-finals. In total, he played 54 games for his country, scoring 3 goals.

== Honours ==
Senegal

- Africa Cup of Nations runner-up: 2002
