= Frédéric Brando =

French footballer (born 1973)

Personal information
- Date of birth: 8 November 1973 (age 52)
- Place of birth: Cannes, France
- Height: 1.76 m (5 ft 9 in)
- Position: Midfielder

Youth career
- Toulon

Senior career*
Years	Team	Apps	(Gls)
1992–1993	Toulon	13	(1)
1993–1994	Monaco	1	(0)
1994–1997	Le Havre	100	(4)
1997–2001	Marseille	102	(3)
2001–2003	Sedan	19	(0)
2003–2006	Clermont	61	(2)
2006–2007	Toulon	21	(1)
Total		317	(11)
- * Club domestic league appearances and goals

Frédéric Brando (born 8 November 1973 in Cannes) is a French former professional footballer who played as a midfielder for the Olympique de Marseille team that reached the 1999 UEFA Cup Final.
