= Jacques Abardonado =

French footballer (born 1978)

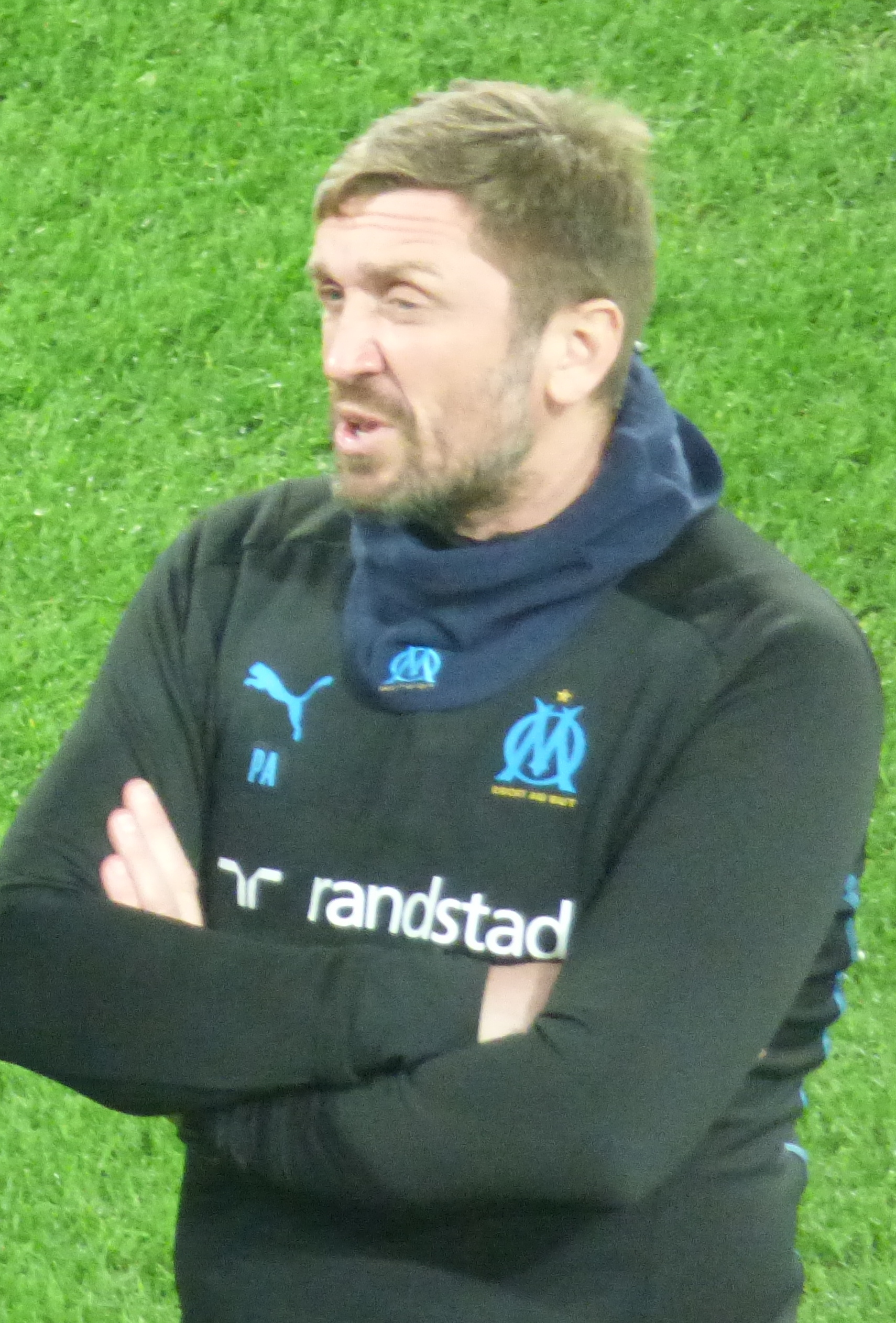
- Abardonado in 2022

Personal information
- Date of birth: 27 May 1978 (age 48)
- Place of birth: Marseille, France
- Height: 1.84 m (6 ft 0 in)
- Position: Defender

Team information
- Current team: Marseille (assistant)

Youth career
- –1996: Marseille Endoume

Senior career*
Years	Team	Apps	(Gls)
1996–1998	Marseille B		
1998–2001	Marseille	33	(3)
2001–2002	Lorient	28	(0)
2002–2007	Nice	175	(2)
2008	1. FC Nürnberg	11	(0)
2008–2010	Valenciennes	33	(0)
2010–2011	Grenoble	28	(0)
2011–2012	Fréjus Saint-Raphaël	10	(0)
2013–2014	Marseille B		
Total		318	(5)

Managerial career
- 2014–2017: Marseille B (assistant)
- 2017–2019: Marseille (youth)
- 2019–2021: Marseille U19 (assistant)
- 2021–2022: Marseille (assistant)
- 2022–2023: Marseille B (assistant)
- 2023–: Marseille (assistant)
- 2023: Marseille (caretaker)
- 2026: Marseille (caretaker)
- * Club domestic league appearances and goals

Jacques Abardonado (born 27 May 1978) is a French football manager and former player, currently assistant coach of Ligue 1 club Marseille.

== Career ==
Abardonado joined Marseille as a player in 1996, coming from Marseille Endoume. He ended his professional playing career at OM in 2014 to pursue coaching. Between 2014 and 2023, he held several roles within the club: assistant coach for the reserve team, head coach for the youth squads, assistant for the U19s, assistant for the first team, and served as interim head coach between Marcelino's departure and Gennaro Gattuso's arrival. In February 2026, he was appointed caretaker manager again after the exit of Roberto De Zerbi.

== Personal life ==
Abardonado is of Spanish Romani descent through his father. His cousin is the French footballer André-Pierre Gignac. He grew up in La Castellane.

== Honours ==
Marseille

- UEFA Cup runner-up: 1998–99

Lorient

- Coupe de France: 2001–02
- Coupe de la Ligue runner-up: 2001–02

Nice

- Coupe de la Ligue runner-up: 2005–06
